= List of longest-running Indian television series =

This is a list of the longest-running Indian television programs, ordered by number of years the show has been aired and that are still aired. This list includes only series broadcast in India with either 1,000 episodes or approximately ten-year run completed series.

Series shaded in light blue are currently in production.

== Hindi ==
=== Non-fiction ===
Length (years)	Title	Network	Genre	Start date	End date	Notes
31	Sa Re Ga Ma Pa	Zee TV	Reality show	1 May 1995		
26	Kaun Banega Crorepati	SET	Reality show	3 July 2000		
22	Indian Idol	SET	Reality show	30 October 2004		
20	Jhalak Dikhhla Jaa	SET	Reality show	7 September 2006		
20	Bigg Boss	Colors TV	Reality show	3 November 2006		
18	Fear Factor: Khatron Ke Khiladi	Colors TV	Reality show	21 July 2008		
17	India's Got Talent	SET	Reality show	27 June 2009		
16	MasterChef India	SET	Reality show	16 October 2010		

=== Fiction ===
Length (Years)	Title	Network	Genre	Start date	End date	No. of episodes	Notes
20	CID	SET	Procedural drama	21 January 1998	4 November 2018	1,547	
18	Taarak Mehta Ka Ooltah Chashmah	Sony SAB	Sitcom	28 July 2008		4,874	
17	Yeh Rishta Kya Kehlata Hai	StarPlus	Soap opera	12 January 2009		5,353	
11	Kumkum Bhagya	Zee TV	Soap opera	15 April 2014	21 September 2025	3,208	
11	Bhabiji Ghar Par Hain!	And TV	Sitcom	2 March 2015	17 April 2026	2,834	
8	Balika Vadhu	Colors TV	Soap opera	21 July 2008	31 July 2016	2,248	
8	Kyunki Saas Bhi Kabhi Bahu Thi	StarPlus	Soap opera	3 July 2000	6 November 2008	1,833	
8	F.I.R.	Sony SAB	Sitcom	31 July 2006	23 January 2015	1,323	
7	Saath Nibhaana Saathiya	StarPlus	Soap opera	3 May 2010	23 July 2017	2,181	
7	Kundali Bhagya	Zee TV	Soap opera	12 July 2017	6 December 2024	2,048	
7	Happu Ki Ultan Paltan	And TV	Sitcom	4 March 2019	13 March 2026	1,760	
7	Kahaani Ghar Ghar Kii	StarPlus	Soap opera	16 October 2000	9 October 2008	1,661	
6	Anupamaa	StarPlus	Soap opera	13 July 2020		2,209	
6	Sasural Simar Ka	Colors TV	Soap opera	25 April 2011	2 March 2018	2,063	
6	Yeh Hai Mohabbatein	StarPlus	Soap opera	3 December 2013	18 December 2019	1,895	
6	Uttaran	Colors TV	Soap opera	1 December 2008	16 January 2015	1,549	
6	Kumkum – Ek Pyara Sa Bandhan	StarPlus	Soap opera	15 July 2002	13 March 2009	1,449	
6	Kasautii Zindagii Kay	StarPlus	Soap opera	29 October 2001	28 February 2008	1,423	
6	Bhabhi	StarPlus	Soap opera	18 March 2002	23 May 2008	1,328	
5	Mann Sundar	Dangal TV	Soap opera	18 October 2021		1,795	
5	Chidiya Ghar	Sony SAB	Sitcom	28 November 2011	2 October 2017	1,522	
5	Diya Aur Baati Hum	StarPlus	Soap opera	29 August 2011	10 September 2016	1,487	
5	Mere Sai – Shraddha Aur Saburi	SET	Mythology	25 September 2017	7 July 2023	1,432	
5	Pavitra Rishta	Zee TV	Soap opera	1 June 2009	25 October 2014	1,424	
5	Woh Rehne Waali Mehlon Ki	Sahara One	Soap opera	30 May 2005	20 January 2011	1,387	
5	Shakti – Astitva Ke Ehsaas Ki	Colors TV	Soap opera	30 May 2016	1 October 2021	1,360	
4	Ghum Hai Kisikey Pyaar Meiin	StarPlus	Soap opera	5 October 2020	4 July 2025	1,625	
4	Yeh Hai Chahatein	StarPlus	Soap opera	19 December 2019	18 September 2024	1,485	
4	Pushpa Impossible	Sony SAB	Soap opera	6 June 2022		1,396	
4	Wagle Ki Duniya – Nayi Peedhi Naye Kissey	Sony SAB	Sitcom	8 February 2021	9 August 2025	1,362	
4	Udaan	Colors TV	Soap opera	18 August 2014	28 June 2019	1,352	
4	RadhaKrishn	Star Bharat	Mythology	1 October 2018	21 January 2023	1,145	
4	Ek Mahanayak – Dr. B. R. Ambedkar	And TV	Historical drama	17 December 2019	5 August 2024	1,135	
4	Baalveer	Sony SAB	Fantasy	8 October 2012	4 November 2016	1,111	
4	Jai Jai Jai Bajrang Bali	Sahara One	Mythology	6 June 2011	31 July 2015	1,085	
4	Vighnaharta Ganesha	SET	Mythology	22 August 2017	12 November 2021	1,026	
4	Kkusum	SET	Soap opera	14 May 2001	30 November 2005	1,001	
3	Bhagya Lakshmi	Zee TV	Soap opera	3 August 2021	29 June 2025	1,358	
3	Mann Atisundar	Dangal TV	Soap opera	24 July 2023		1,216	
3	Parineetii	Colors TV	Soap opera	14 February 2022	24 August 2025	1,216	
3	Imlie	StarPlus	Soap opera	16 November 2020	12 May 2024	1,176	
3	Pandya Store	StarPlus	Soap opera	25 January 2021	26 May 2024	1,137	
3	Udaariyaan	Colors TV	Soap opera	15 March 2021	24 July 2024	1,121	
3	Nath	Dangal TV	Soap opera	23 August 2021	12 October 2024	1,072	
3	Ek Mahal Ho Sapno Ka	SET	Soap opera	25 January 1999	29 November 2002	1,000	
2	Suhani Si Ek Ladki	StarPlus	Soap opera	9 June 2014	21 May 2017	1,013	

== Telugu ==
Length (years)	Title	Network	Genre	Start date	End date	No. of episodes	Notes
31	Aaradhana	ETV	Reality, devotional	28 August 1995		5000+	Longest running devotional show in India
31	Annadata	ETV	Reality, agricultural	28 August 1995		5000+	Longest running Telugu agricultural based show
30	Padutha Theeyaga	ETV	Reality, music	12 January 1996		1100+	Longest running Telugu music-reality show
16	Dhee	ETV	Reality, dance	2009		580	
13	Jabardasth	ETV	Comedy	7 February 2013		632	
13	Srikaram Subhakaram	Zee Telugu	Astrology show	13 May 2013		4,909+	Longest running Telugu astrological show
13	Bhakti Samacharam	Zee Telugu	Spiritual show			4,060	Longest running Telugu spiritual show
13	Abhishekam	ETV	Soap opera	22 December 2008	1 February 2022	4,000	Longest ran Telugu soap opera
12	Omkaram	Zee Telugu	Astrology show	9 December 2013		3,930+	
12	Extra Jabardasth	ETV	Comedy	10 October 2014		400	
12	Star Mahila	ETV	Game show	9 August 2008	3 April 2021	3,319	Longest ran Telugu game show
11	Aadade Aadharam	ETV	Soap opera	26 January 2009	14 March 2020	3,329	
10	Manasu Mamata	ETV	Soap opera	31 January 2011	17 November 2021	3,305	
10	Mee Inti Vanta	Zee Telugu	Cooking show			3,016	Longest running Telugu cooking show
9	Bigg Boss Telugu	Star Maa	Reality show	16 July 2017		1,000	
8	Gundamma Katha	Zee Telugu	Soap opera	9 April 2018		2,578+	
8	Gadasari Atta Sogasari Kodalu	Zee Telugu	Game show			1,012	
7	Attarintiki Daredi	ETV	Soap opera	10 November 2014	30 July 2022	2,344	
7	Kumkuma Puvvu	Star Maa	Soap opera	18 July 2016	26 April 2024	2,300	
7	Seethamma Vakitlo Sirimalle Chettu	ETV	Soap opera	21 September 2015	15 October 2022	2,152	
7	Swathi Chinukulu	ETV	Soap opera	9 September 2013	19 September 2020	2,126	
7	Gopuram	Zee Telugu	Mythological show			1,908	
6	Naa Peru Meenakshi	ETV	Soap opera	26 January 2015	18 January 2022	1,997	
6	Aarogyame Mahayogam	Zee Telugu	Astrology show	7 September 2020		1,846+	
6	Chandra Mukhi	ETV	Soap opera	21 May 2007	7 September 2013	1,850	
6	Bathuku Jataka Bandi	Zee Telugu	Talk show	6 July 2015	24 July 2021	1,580	
5	Anthahpuram	ETV	Soap opera	2 March 2009	8 November 2014	1,755	
5	Bharyamani	ETV	Soap opera	30 March 2009	15 November 2014	1,741	
5	Paape Maa Jeevanajyothi	Star Maa	Soap opera	26 April 2021		1,729+	
5	Prema Entha Madhuram	Zee Telugu	Soap opera	10 February 2020	5 July 2025	1,601	
5	Muddha Mandaram	Zee Telugu	Soap opera	17 November 2014	28 December 2019	1,585	
5	Rangula Ratnam	ETV	Soap Opera	17 November 2021		1,568+	
5	Kalyana Vaibhogam	Zee Telugu	Soap opera	1 May 2017	21 January 2023	1,572	
5	Karthika Deepam	Star Maa	Soap opera	16 October 2017	23 January 2023	1,569	
5	Suryakantham	Zee Telugu	Soap opera	22 July 2019	9 November 2024	1,559	
5	Muddu Bidda	Zee Telugu	Soap opera	29 June 2009	23 August 2014	1,398	
5	Mogali Rekulu	Gemini TV	Soap opera	18 February 2008	24 May 2013	1,368	
5	Agni Poolu	Gemini TV	Soap opera	13 August 2012	25 August 2017	1,326	
4	Radhamma Kuthuru	Zee Telugu	Soap opera	26 August 2019	3 August 2024	1,477	
4	Trinayani	Zee Telugu	Soap opera	2 March 2020	25 January 2025	1,463	
4	Manasantha Nuvve	ETV	Soap opera	19 January 2022	29 August 2026	1,441	
4	Telugu Ruchi	ETV	Cookery show	30 September 2017	30 July 2022	1,397	
4	Mukkupudaka	Zee Telugu	Soap opera	11 July 2022		1,365+	
4	Puttadi Bomma	ETV	Soap opera	22 February 2010	28 June 2014	1,356	
4	Savithri	ETV	Soap opera	6 April 2015	13 July 2019	1,333	
4	Ashta Chemma	Star Maa	Soap opera	25 February 2013	16 December 2017	1,321	
4	Shathamanam Bhavathi	ETV	Soap opera	5 April 2021	27 June 2025	1,308	
4	Abhishekam	Zee Telugu	Spiritual show			1,288	
4	Malli Nindu Jabili	Star Maa	Soap opera	28 February 2022	31 March 2026	1,227	
4	Vah Re Vah	Zee Telugu	Cooking show			1,196	
4	Kalyanee	Gemini TV	Soap opera	4 July 2005	29 January 2010	1,195	
4	Chi La Sow Sravanthi	Gemini TV	Soap opera	13 November 2006	13 May 2011	1,162	
4	Koilamma	Star Maa	Soap opera	5 September 2016	18 September 2020	1,153	
4	Devatha	Gemini TV	Soap opera	12 January 2009	31 May 2013	1,142	
4	Chakravakam	Gemini TV	Soap opera	3 November 2003	15 February 2008	1,111	
4	Kalavari Kodallu	Zee Telugu	Soap opera	9 May 2011	13 December 2014	1,072	
4	Padmavyuham	ETV	Soap opera	17 February 2003	27 December 2007	1,048	
4	Cash 2.0	ETV	Game show	3 March 2018	December 2022	241	
3	Brahmamudi	Star Maa	Soap opera	24 January 2023		1,195+	
3	Ravoyi Chandamama	ETV	Soap opera	26 April 2021	18 January 2025	1,170	
3	Guppedantha Manasu	Star Maa	Soap opera	7 December 2020	31 August 2024	1,168	
3	Intinti Gruhalakshmi	Star Maa	Soap opera	3 February 2020	20 January 2024	1,158	
3	Padamati Sandhya Ragam	Zee Telugu	Soap opera	19 September 2022	1 May 2026	1,156	
3	Lakshmi Kalyanam	Star Maa	Soap opera	7 November 2016	10 October 2020	1,128	
3	Pasupu Kumkuma	Zee Telugu	Soap opera	22 November 2010	15 November 2014	1,094	
3	Thaali	Gemini TV	Soap opera	31 August 2020	20 January 2024	1,055	
3	Nindu Noorella Savaasam	Zee Telugu	Soap opera	14 August 2023		1,048	
3	Mattigaajulu	Gemini TV	Soap opera	1 July 2019	25 February 2023	1,043	
3	Kalavari Kodalu	Gemini TV	Soap opera	23 July 2001	1 July 2005	1,024	
3	Rama Seetha Ekkada	Zee Telugu	Soap opera	25 August 2014	9 December 2017	1,021	
3	Mangamma Gari Manavaralu	Zee Telugu	Soap opera	3 June 2013	29 April 2017	1,018	

== Tamil ==
Length (years)	Title	Network	Genre	Start date	End date	No. of episodes	Notes
25	Kalyana Malai	Sun TV	Marriage talk show	2000		1,200+	
25	Arul Neeram	Jaya TV	Astrological show	11 February 2001		8,522	Longest running astrological show
25	Chinna Papa Periya Papa	Sun TV	Soap opera, Sitcom	2000		455	
20	Kalakka Povathu Yaaru?	Star Vijay	Reality show	2005			
20	Super Singer	Star Vijay	Music	28 April 2006			
20	Neeya Naana	Star Vijay	Talk show	7 May 2006		900+	
19	Jodi Number One	Star Vijay	Dancing show	16 October 2006		400+	
16	Olimayamana Ethirkaalam	Zee Tamil	Astrological show	2 December 2009		5,954+	
14	Deiva Dharisanam	Sun TV	Astrological show	2011		1,031	
13	Solvathellam Unmai	Zee Tamil; Kalaignar TV	Talk show	2 October 2009	2022	2,915	
13	Sapthashwarangal	Sun TV	Reality show	1 January 1993	1 January 2006	646	Longest ran Tamil musical show
12	Anjarai Petti	Zee Tamil	Cooking show	13 October 2008	1 November 2020	2,761	Longest ran Tamil cooking show
11	Kitchen Killadigal	Vasanth TV	Cooking show	2 October 2014		2,500+	
11	Arputham Tharum Aalayangal	Zee Tamil	Astrological show	23 December 2014		1,544	
9	Aanmeega Kathaigal	Sun TV	Astrological show	1 March 2017		1,996	
9	Rusikkala Vanga	Puthuyugam TV	Cooking show	24 April 2017		1,500+	
9	Bigg Boss Tamil	Star Vijay	Reality show	25 June 2017		1,020+	
8	Vanakkam Tamizha	Sun TV	Talk show	4 December 2017		1,900+	
8	Nalla Kalam Piraguthu	Sun TV	Astrological show	30 April 2018		3,065+	
8	Chandralekha	Sun TV	Soap Opera	6 October 2014	8 October 2022	2,315	Longest ran Tamil Soap Opera
8	Pandian Stores	Star Vijay	Soap opera	1 October 2018		2,302+	
8	Koppiyam	Raj TV	Procedural drama	2 October 2012	28 March 2021	2,200+	
7	Saravanan Meenatchi	Star Vijay	Soap Opera	7 March 2011	17 August 2018	1,901	
6	Valli	Sun TV	Soap opera	17 December 2012	14 September 2019	1,961	
6	Kalyana Parisu	Sun TV	Soap opera	10 February 2014	27 March 2020	1,840	
6	Kolangal	Sun TV	Soap opera	24 November 2003	4 December 2009	1,533	
6	Kasthuri	Sun TV	Soap opera	21 August 2006	31 August 2012	1,532	
6	Mouna Raagam	Star Vijay	Soap opera	24 January 2017	17 March 2023	1,380	
5	Kelvi Kalam	Sun News	Talk Show	31 December 2020		2,065+	
5	Vani Rani	Sun TV	Soap opera	21 January 2013	8 December 2018	1,743	
5	Sooriya Vanakkam	Sun TV	Morning show	2 January 2012	17 November 2017	1,578	
5	Baakiyalakshmi	Star Vijay	Soap Opera	27 July 2020	8 August 2025	1,469	
5	Thirumathi Selvam	Sun TV	Soap opera	5 November 2007	22 March 2013	1,360	
5	Nadhaswaram	Sun TV	Soap opera	19 April 2010	9 May 2015	1,356	
5	Thendral	Sun TV	Soap opera	7 December 2009	17 January 2015	1,340	
5	Eeramana Rojave	Star Vijay	Soap opera	9 July 2018	2 December 2023	1,309	
5	Raja Rani	Star Vijay	Soap opera	29 May 2017	21 March 2023	1,307	
5	Anandham	Sun TV	Soap opera	24 November 2003	27 February 2009	1,297	
5	Bhairavi Aavigalukku Priyamanaval	Sun TV	Soap opera	29 January 2012	10 September 2017	1,289	
5	Athipookal	Sun TV	Soap opera	3 December 2007	14 December 2012	1,272	
4	Kayal	Sun TV	Soap opera	25 October 2021	24 October 2026	1,555	
4	Deivamagal	Sun TV	Soap opera	25 March 2013	17 February 2018	1,466	
4	Ethirneechal	Sun TV	Soap opera	7 February 2022		1,430+	
4	Sembaruthi	Zee Tamil	Soap opera	16 October 2017	31 July 2022	1,432	
4	Ninaithale Inikkum	Zee Tamil	Soap Opera	23 August 2021	25 October 2025	1,417	
4	Tharkappu Kalai	Sun TV	Morning show	4 January 2003	6 April 2007	1,412	
4	Vamsam	Sun TV	Soap opera	10 June 2013	18 November 2017	1,338	
4	Mundhanai Mudichu	Sun TV	Soap opera	26 April 2010	4 April 2015	1,325	
4	Roja	Sun TV	Soap opera	9 April 2018	3 December 2022	1,316	
4	Priyamanaval	Sun TV	Soap opera	19 January 2015	11 May 2019	1,315	
4	Intro Blooper	Sun TV	Comedy show	3 January 2011	5 September 2015	1,286	
4	Ilavarasi	Sun TV	Soap opera	18 January 2010	1 November 2014	1,263	
4	Yaaradi Nee Mohini	Zee Tamil	Supernatural	24 April 2017	29 August 2021	1,253	
4	Nijam	Sun TV	Crime show	27 November 2006	7 October 2011	1,230	
4	Pandavar Illam	Sun TV	Soap opera	15 July 2019	28 October 2023	1,216	
4	Selvi	Sun TV	Soap opera	24 January 2005	11 September 2009	1,184	
4	Bharathi Kannamma	Star Vijay	Soap opera	25 February 2019	6 August 2023	1,169	
4	Bommalattam	Sun TV	Soap opera	15 October 2012	22 October 2016	1,150	
4	Poove Poochudava	Zee Tamil	Soap opera	24 April 2017	4 September 2021	1,149	
4	Vasantham	Sun TV	Soap opera	3 September 2007	27 January 2012	1,109	
4	Azhagi	Sun TV	Soap opera	10 October 2011	4 March 2016	1,101	
4	Magal	Sun TV	Soap opera	8 October 2007	14 October 2011	1,115	
4	Avargal	Sun TV	Soap opera	6 January 2003	2 November 2007	1,077	
4	Naam Iruvar Namakku Iruvar	Star Vijay	Soap opera	26 March 2018	10 June 2022	1,055	
3	Karthigai Deepam	Zee Tamil	Soap opera	5 December 2022		1,427+	
3	Siragadikka Aasai	Star Vijay	Soap opera	23 January 2023		1,183+	
3	Idhayam	Zee Tamil	Soap opera	28 August 2023		1,161+	
3	Sundari	Sun TV	Soap opera	22 February 2021	1 December 2024	1,144	
3	Vanathai Pola	Sun TV	Drama	7 December 2020	17 August 2024	1,134	
3	Thamarai	Sun TV	Soap opera	3 November 2014	4 August 2018	1,129	
3	Anbe Vaa	Sun TV	Soap opera	2 November 2020	28 April 2024	1,102	
3	Maragatha Veenai	Sun TV	Soap opera	27 January 2014	28 September 2017	1,102	
3	Nandini	Sun TV	Super natural soap opera	23 January 2017	31 July 2020	1,077	
3	Sathya	Zee Tamil	Soap opera	4 March 2019	6 October 2022	1,070	
3	Maari	Zee Tamil	Drama	4 July 2022	1 November 2025	1,068	
3	Aarthi	Raj TV	Soap opera	3 January 2005	26 December 2008	1,054	
3	Sandhya Raagam	Zee Tamil	Soap opera	9 October 2023		1,039+	
3	Anandha Ragam	Sun TV	Soap opera	29 August 2022	14 January 2026	1,043	
3	Magarasi	Sun TV	Soap opera	21 October 2019	1 July 2023	1,036	
3	Oru Oorla Oru Rajakumari	Zee Tamil	Soap opera	23 April 2018	24 October 2021	1,017	
3	Roja	Jaya TV	Soap opera	January 2003	21 December 2006	1,014	
3	Rettai Roja	Zee Tamil	Soap opera	12 August 2019	17 March 2023	1,013	
3	Singapennae	Sun TV	Soap opera	9 October 2023		1,001+	
3	Pudhu Vasantham	Sun TV	Soap opera	26 June 2023	26 September 2026	1,003	
2	Amman	Colors Tamil	Drama	27 January 2020	1 July 2022	1,150	
2	Idhayathai Thirudathe	Colors Tamil	Drama	14 February 2020	3 June 2022	1,097	
2	Sorgam	Sun TV	Soap opera	3 March 2003	2 March 2007	1,000	

== Kannada ==
Length (years)	Title	Network	Genre	Start date	End date	No. of episodes	Notes
24	Thatt Antha Heli	DD Chandana	Quiz show	4 January 2002		5,000	Longest running Quiz show in India
13	Bigg Boss Kannada	Colors Kannada	Reality show	24 March 2013		1,241	
12	Maharishi Vaani	Zee Kannada	Astrology show	16 June 2014		4,248+	Longest running Kannada astrological show
11	Baduku	ETV Kannada	Soap opera	3 February 2003	28 September 2014	3,118	Longest ran Kannada soap opera
9	Mangala Gowri Maduve	Colors Kannada	Soap opera	12 December 2012	9 October 2022	3,026	
8	Mangalya	Udaya TV	Soap opera	12 April 2004	2 November 2012	2,220	
7	Sevanthi	Udaya TV	Soap opera	25 February 2019	4 July 2026	2,225	
6	Lakshmi Baramma	Colors Kannada	Soap opera	4 March 2013	25 January 2020	2,150	
6	Mane Ondu Mooru Bagilu	ETV Kannada	Soap opera	2006	2012	2,000+	
6	Oggarane Dabbi	Zee Kannada	Cookery show	2 January 2012	13 April 2018	1,823	
6	Bombat Bhojena	Star Suvarna	Cookery Show	19 October 2020		1,700+	
6	Suvarna Superstar	Star Suvarna	Game Show	23 November 2020		1,700+	
6	Agnisakshi	Colors Kannada	Soap opera	2 December 2013	3 January 2020	1,588	
6	Majaa Talkies	Colors Kannada	Comedy show	7 February 2015	8 May 2021	498	
5	Muddulakshmi	Star Suvarna	Soap opera	22 January 2018	26 August 2023	1,725	
5	Amruthavarshini	Star Suvarna	Soap opera	19 March 2012	24 November 2017	1,724	
5	Parvathi Parmeshwara	Zee Kannada	Soap opera	27 July 2009	27 June 2015	1,619	
5	Kulavadhu	Colors Kannada	Soap opera	28 July 2014	31 August 2019	1,590	
5	Paaru	Zee Kannada	Soap opera	3 December 2018	16 March 2024	1,393	
5	Silli Lalli	ETV Kannada	Sitcom	2003	2008	1200+	
4	Panduranga Vittala	Zee Kannada	Soap opera	4 January 2010	13 December 2014	1,338	
4	Yediyur Sri Siddhalingeshwara	Star Suvarna	Soap Opera; Mythological	21 December 2020	3 May 2025	1,320	
4	Gupta Gamini	ETV Kannada	Soap opera	7 July 2003	4 July 2008	1,300	
4	Kadambari	Udaya TV	Soap opera	13 December 2004	6 November 2009	1,275	
4	Gattimela	Zee Kannada	Soap opera	11 March 2019	5 January 2024	1,245	
4	Puttakkana Makkalu	Zee Kannada	Soap opera	13 December 2021	5 March 2026	1,239	
4	Chi Sow Savithri	Zee Kannada	Soap opera	26 July 2010	15 November 2014	1,204	
4	Kamali	Zee Kannada	Soap opera	28 May 2018	7 October 2022	1,178	
4	Geetha	Colors Kannada	Soap opera	6 January 2020	9 March 2024	1,107	
4	Brahmagantu	Zee Kannada	Soap opera	8 May 2017	9 July 2021	1,072	
4	Jokali	Udaya TV	Soap opera	22 June 2009	26 July 2013	1,062	
3	Kinnari	Colors Kannada	Soap opera	2 November 2015	24 August 2019	1,193	
3	Sri Renuka Yellamma	Star Suvarna	Soap opera	23 January 2023	24 May 2026	1177	
3	Anna Thangi	Udaya TV	Soap opera	22 November 2021	23 August 2025	1,174	
3	Gowripurada Gayyaligalu	Udaya TV	Soap opera	15 March 2021	8 September 2024	1,145	
3	Bhagyalakshmi	Colors Kannada	Soap opera	10 October 2022	7 June 2026	1,159	
3	Amruthadhaare	Zee Kannada	Soap opera	29 May 2023	15 November 2026	1,123	
3	Nammane Yuvarani	Colors Kannada	Soap opera	14 January 2019	24 September 2022	1,085	
3	Radha Kalyana	Zee Kannada	Soap opera	29 August 2011	6 June 2015	1,076	
3	Naagini	Zee Kannada	Soap opera	8 February 2016	7 February 2020	1,054	
3	Mahadevi	Zee Kannada	Soap opera	14 September 2015	30 August 2019	1,043	
3	Kumkuma Bhagya	Udaya TV	Soap opera	12 May 2003	4 May 2007	1,040	
3	Akka	Colors Kannada	Soap opera	2 December 2013	20 October 2017	1,012	
3	Ramachaari	Colors Kannada	Soap opera	31 January 2022	28 December 2025	1000+	
2	Aase	Star Suvarna	Soap opera	12 December 2023		1,052	

== Malayalam ==
Length (years)	Title	Network	Genre	Start date	End date	No. of episodes	Notes
26	Munshi	Asianet News	Satire	11 September 2000		8,450+	Longest running satire show in India
26	Nammal Thammil	Asianet	Talk show	18 September 1994	13 December 2020	944	Longest ran talk show in India
25	Anantham Ajnaatham	Asianet	Astrology show	19 February 1995	19 April 2020	1310	
25	Sancharam	Asianet (2001-2013) Safari TV (2013 - Present)	Travel show	2001		2,100	Longest running travel show in India
22	Kannadi	Asianet	News-based	30 August 1993	10 July 2016	1,000	
22	Kisan Krishideepam	Asianet	Reality show	1 November 2003		1042	
21	Amruthavarsham	Amrita TV	Devotional	16 April 2005		1,837	
20	Cinemala	Asianet	Satire	31 August 1993	23 September 2013	1,004	
20	Sandhya Deepam	Amrita TV	Devotional	2 January 2006		5,868	
20	Star Singer	Asianet	Reality show	22 April 2006		1,638	
20	Super Star	Amrita TV	Reality show	12 June 2006		700	
20	Nere Chovve	Manorama News	Talk show	26 August 2006		815	
19	Valkkannadi	Asianet	Women centric Game Show	29 April 2002	31 December 2021	2,542	
14	Sreeramante Veritta Kaazchakal	Kairali TV	Reality show	6 March 2003	23 September 2017	755	
15	Marimayam	Mazhavil Manorama	Sitcom	5 November 2011		995	
13	Taste Time	Asianet	Cookery show	8 April 2013	22 September 2026	1,877	Longest ran Malayalam cookery show
13	Gandharva Sangeetham	Kairali TV	Reality show	2000	2013	1100+	
12	Comedy Stars	Asianet	Reality show	19 December 2009	12 November 2022	1,618	
12	Udayamritham	Amrita TV	Spiritual	15 April 2005	29 December 2017	4,641	
11	Thatteem Mutteem	Mazhavil Manorama	Sitcom	1 July 2012	2 July 2023	881	
11	Charithram Enniloode	Safari TV	Autobiography	25 May 2015		2,590	
10	Kadhayallithu Jeevitham	Amrita TV	Family court show	4 October 2010	14 April 2020	1,000	
10	Uppum Mulakum	Flowers TV	Sitcom	14 December 2015		2,400+	Longest running Malayalam sitcom
8	Top Singer	Flowers TV	Reality show	22 September 2018		2,000	Longest running Malayalam music reality show
8	Sthree	Asianet	Soap opera	21 December 1998	12 January 2007	1,493	
7	Udan Panam	Mazhavil Manorama	Game show	11 May 2017	9 November 2024	1,000	
6	Mounaragam	Asianet	Soap opera	16 December 2019	29 May 2026	1,700	
6	Aliyans	Kaumudy TV	Sitcom	24 February 2020		1,430	
6	Santhwanam	Asianet	Soap opera	21 September 2020		1,750	
5	Manjil Virinja Poovu	Mazhavil Manorama	Soap opera	4 March 2019	21 July 2024	1,525	
5	Parasparam	Asianet	Soap opera	22 July 2013	31 August 2018	1,524	
5	Oru Chiri Iru Chiri Bumper Chiri	Mazhavil Manorama	Sketch Comedy show	19 April 2021		1,555	
5	Kanyadanam	Surya TV	Soap Opera	23 August 2021		1,820	Longest running Malayalam soap opera
4	Karuthamuthu	Asianet	Soap opera	20 October 2014	9 August 2019	1,450	
4	Kudumbavilakku	Asianet	Soap opera	27 January 2020	3 August 2024	1,204	
4	Minnukettu	Surya TV	Soap opera	16 August 2004	2 January 2009	1,129	
4	Karyam Nissaram	Kairali TV	Sitcom	1 October 2012	2 June 2017	1,104	
4	Devimahathyamam	Asianet	Mythology	2008	2012	1,000	Longest ran Malayalam mythological soap opera
4	Kudumbashree Sharada	Zee Keralam	Soap opera	11 April 2022	16 October 2026	1,634	
3	Chandanamazha	Asianet	Soap opera	3 February 2014	9 December 2017	1,173	
3	Sthreedhanam	Asianet	Soap opera	2 July 2012	14 May 2016	1,143	
3	Vanambadi	Asianet	Soap opera	30 January 2017	18 September 2020	1,015	
3	Amma	Asianet	Soap opera	2 January 2012	4 July 2015	1,009	
3	Nilavilakku	Surya TV	Soap opera	15 June 2009	10 May 2013	1,006	
3	Sukhamo Devi	Flowers TV	Soap opera	8 May 2023		1,075	
3	Patharamattu	Asianet	Soap opera	15 May 2023		1,100	
3	Bhavana	Surya TV	Soap opera	26 June 2022	29 June 2025	1,078	
3	Mangalyam	Zee Keralam	Soap opera	4 September 2023	25 September 2026	1,030	
2	Hridayam	Surya TV	Soap opera	20 November 2023		1,045	
2	Kaliveedu	Surya TV	Soap Opera	15 November 2021	22 September 2024	1,000	

== Marathi ==
Length (years)	Title	Network	Genre	Start date	End date	No. of episodes	Notes
22	Home Minister	Zee Marathi	Game show	13 September 2004		6,293	Longest ran Marathi game show
19	Aamhi Saare Khavayye	Zee Marathi	Cooking show	1 May 2007		3,752	Longest running Marathi cooking show
11	Char Divas Sasuche	Colors Marathi	Soap opera	26 November 2001	5 January 2013	3,147	Longest ran Marathi soap opera
11	Mejwani Paripoorna Kitchen	Colors Marathi	Cooking show	2007	26 August 2017	2,435	
11	Chala Hawa Yeu Dya	Zee Marathi	Comedy show	18 August 2014	14 December 2025	1,177	Longest ran Marathi comedy reality show
9	Gajar Kirtanacha Sohla Anandacha	Zee Talkies	Mythology show	6 February 2017		5,000+	
8	Man Mandira Gajar Bhakticha	Zee Talkies	Mythology show	25 June 2018		2,323	
6	Vedh Bhavishyacha	Zee Marathi	Astrology show	8 June 2020		2,352	
6	Jai Jai Swami Samarth	Colors Marathi	Mytho drama	28 December 2020		2,012	
6	Pudhcha Paaul	Star Pravah	Soap opera	2 May 2011	1 July 2017	1,944	
5	Balumamachya Navan Changbhala	Colors Marathi	Mytho drama	13 August 2018	28 July 2024	1,848	
5	Damini	DD Sahyadri	Soap opera	3 October 1996		1,500+	
5	Lakshya	Star Pravah	Crime show	25 August 2011	17 September 2016	1,226	
4	Aai Kuthe Kay Karte!	Star Pravah	Soap opera	23 December 2019	30 November 2024	1,491	
4	Muramba	Star Pravah	Soap opera	14 February 2022	28 June 2026	1,408	
4	Majhya Navaryachi Bayko	Zee Marathi	Soap opera	22 August 2016	7 March 2021	1,354	
4	Tharala Tar Mag!	Star Pravah	Soap opera	5 December 2022		1,338	
4	Devyani	Star Pravah	Soap opera	19 March 2012	28 May 2016	1,314	
4	Tu Majha Saangaati	Colors Marathi	Mytho drama	11 July 2014	11 August 2018	1,299	
4	Aboli	Star Pravah	Soap opera	23 November 2021	26 October 2025	1,267	
4	Tujhyat Jeev Rangala	Zee Marathi	Soap opera	3 October 2016	2 January 2021	1,262	
4	Sukh Mhanje Nakki Kay Asta!	Star pravah	Soap opera	17 August 2020	22 December 2024	1,261	
3	Swapnanchya Palikadle	Star Pravah	Soap opera	16 August 2010	14 June 2014	1,216	
3	Avaghachi Sansar	Zee Marathi	Soap opera	22 May 2006	24 April 2010	1,169	
3	Durva	Star Pravah	Soap opera	18 March 2013	12 November 2016	1,164	
3	Gatha Navnathanchi	Sony Marathi	Mytho drama	21 June 2021	5 January 2025	1,156	
3	Rang Majha Vegla	Star Pravah	Soap opera	30 October 2019	3 September 2023	1,129	
6	Devmanus; 1, 2 & 3	Zee Marathi	Crime show	31 August 2020		1,013	
3	Shubhvivah	Star Pravah	Soap opera	16 January 2023	1 March 2026	1,005	
3	Sahkutumb Sahparivar	Star Pravah	Soap opera	24 February 2020	3 August 2023	1,000	
3	Asava Sundar Swapnancha Bangla	Colors Marathi	Soap opera	7 January 2013	19 March 2016	1,000	

== Bengali ==
Length (years)	Title	Network	Genre	Start date	End date	No. of episodes	Notes
22	Police Files	Aakash Aath	Crime show	16 May 2004		5000+	Longest running Bengali crime show
21	Rannaghor	Zee Bangla	Cooking show	9 May 2005	27 June 2026	5,416	Longest running Bengali cooking show
19	Dance Bangla Dance	Zee Bangla	Reality show	6 April 2007		5000+	
17	Good Morning Aakash	Aakash Aath	Morning show	2008		4000+	Longest running Bengali game show
16	Dadagiri Unlimited	Zee Bangla	Reality show	27 July 2009		6,970	
16	Didi No. 1	Zee Bangla	Game show	2010		3,679	
11	Gopal Bhar	Aakash Aath; Sony Aath	Animation series	15 April 2015		1100+	
9	Shadhak Bamakhaypa	Colors Bangla	Historical drama	15 January 2007	1 October 2016	2,996	Longest ran Bengali historical drama
8	Radhuni	Aakash Aath	Cooking show	3 February 2018		1300+	
6	Tithir Athithi	Colors Bangla	Soap opera	2003	2009	1,800+	
5	Erao Shatru	Zee Bangla	Crime show	2006	3 November 2011	1,650	
4	Karunamoyee Rani Rashmoni	Zee Bangla	Historical drama	24 July 2017	13 February 2022	1,549	
4	Agnipariksha	Zee Bangla	Soap opera	18 May 2009	5 April 2014	1,533	
4	Maa....Tomay Chara Ghum Ashena	Star Jalsha	Soap opera	19 October 2009	3 August 2014	1,508	
4	Ke Apon Ke Por	Star Jalsha	Soap opera	25 July 2016	27 December 2020	1,507	
4	Raashi	Zee Bangla	Soap opera	31 January 2011	11 July 2015	1,395	
4	Ishti Kutum	Star Jalsha	Soap opera	24 October 2011	13 December 2015	1,332	
4	Ek Akasher Niche	Zee Bangla	Soap opera	24 July 2000	28 January 2005	1,178	
3	Anurager Chhowa	Star Jalsha	Soap opera	7 February 2022	30 November 2025	1,245	
3	Sholoana	Colors Bangla	Soap opera	10 August 2009	15 June 2013	1,205	
3	Krishnakoli	Zee Bangla	Soap opera	18 June 2018	9 January 2022	1,202	
3	@Bhalobasha.com	Star Jalsha	Soap opera	31 May 2010	22 March 2014	1,201	
3	Jagaddhatri	Zee Bangla	Soap opera	29 August 2022	14 December 2025	1,201	
3	Bodhuboron	Star Jalsha	Soap opera	19 August 2013	29 January 2017	1,163	
3	Binni Dhaner Khoi	Colors Bangla	Soap opera	31 August 2009	16 March 2013	1,108	
3	Rani Kahini	Zee Bangla	Soap opera	29 May 2006	26 September 2009	1,044	

== Odia ==
Length (years)	Title	Network	Genre	Start date	End date	No. of episodes	Notes
14	Rajo Queen	Zee Sarthak	Reality show	2012		500+	Longest running Odia Reality show
6	Mo Sindurara Adhikara	Tarang TV	Soap opera	25 February 2020		2,008	Longest running Odia soap opera
6	Tu Mo Akhira Tara	Tarang TV	Soap opera	6 November 2017	4 August 2024	2,006	
6	To Aganara Tulasi Mun	Zee Sarthak	Soap opera	15 October 2012	16 March 2019	1,863	
5	Jhia Amara Nua Bohu	Tarang TV	Soap opera	17 July 2017	27 May 2023	1,734	
5	Durga	Tarang TV	Soap opera	1 December 2014	22 February 2020	1,624	
5	Sindura Bindu	Zee Sarthak	Soap opera	17 November 2014	15 February 2020	1,532	
4	Suna Jhia	Zee Sarthak	Soap opera	30 May 2022		1,419	
4	Jibana Saathi	Zee Sarthak	Soap opera	20 March 2017	21 August 2021	1,284	
4	Pari	Zee Sarthak	Soap opera	24 June 2013	7 October 2017	1,253	
4	To Pain Mu Mo Pain Tu	Zee Sarthak	Soap opera	26 February 2018	28 May 2022	1,218	
4	Badhu	Zee Sarthak	Soap opera	11 March 2013	11 March 2017	1,071	
4	Jagruti	Zee Sarthak	Soap opera	14 November 2022		1,050	
3	Tu Khara Mun Chhai	Zee Sarthak	Soap opera	2 January 2023		1,227	
3	Manini	Zee Sarthak	Soap opera	25 August 2014	7 July 2018	1,175	
3	Tori Pain To Pain	Tarang TV	Soap opera	29 May 2023		1,109	
3	Rani	Tarang TV	Soap opera	15 June 2015	6 October 2018	1,037	

== Gujarati ==
Length (years)	Title	Network	Genre	Start date	End date	No. of episodes	Notes
21	Rasoi Show	Colors Gujarati	Cooking show	25 October 2004		6,787	Longest running Gujarati cooking show
7	Ek Dal Na Pankhi	DD Girnar	Soap opera	12 September 2005	2 May 2013	1,580	Longest ran Gujarati soap opera
5	Flavours of Gujarat	Colors Gujarati	Cooking show	2 January 2012	30 December 2017	1,729	
5	Rashi Rikshawwali	Colors Gujarati	Soap opera	24 August 2020	12 August 2025	1,586	
5	Daily Bonus	Colors Gujarati	Reality show	1 December 2014	1 February 2020	1,577	
4	Moti Baa Ni Nani Vahu	Colors Gujarati	Soap opera	15 November 2021	15 August 2026	1,515	
4	Saavaj	Colors Gujarati	Soap opera	5 December 2016	21 August 2020	1,056	

== Assamese ==
Length (years)	Title	Network	Genre	Start date	End date	No. of episodes	Notes
13	Beharbari Outpost	Rengoni	Sitcom	7 October 2013		3,488+	Longest running Assamese daily sitcom
7	Bharaghar	Rang	Sitcom	26 November 2012	16 November 2019	1,446	
5	Borola Kai	Rang	Sitcom	23 March 2015	28 November 2020	1,612	
4	Oi Khapla	Rang	Sitcom	20 July 2015	2 February 2019	1,094	

== See also ==
- List of longest-running television shows by category
- List of television programs by episode count
