= Chembarathi (TV series) =

2018 Indian television series

- Genre: Soap opera
- Written by: Sumesh Chathanur
- Directed by: Dr. S. Janardhanan
- Starring: Haritha Nair; Amala; Stebin Jacob; Nikitha Murali; Sree Padma; Blessy Kurian; Yavanika Gopalakrishnan; Nandhan Senanipuram
- Theme music composer: M. Jayachandran
- Opening theme: Mazhanoolil
- Country of origin: India
- Original language: Malayalam
- No. of episodes: 950

Production
- Camera setup: Multi-camera
- Running time: 22 minutes

Original release
- Network: Zee Keralam
- Release: 26 November 2018 – 25 March 2022

Related
- Muddha Mandaram

Chembarathi is a Malayalam language television serial broadcasting on Zee Keralam. The show stars Thara Kalyan, Amala Girish, Nikitha Murali and Stebin. It ran from November 26, 2018, until March 25, 2022, making it one of the longest-running daily soap operas in Malayalam. Chembarathi is an official remake of the Zee Telugu television series Muddha Mandaram.

The story is about a rich, strong-willed and stubborn woman, Thrichambarath Akhilandeshwari (Akhila), and her elder son Anand. Akhila, who struggles with a complicated relationship with her sister, Vilasini. Anand has an intense love story with Kalyani, a servant working as a cook. Various problems disrupt their relationship.

== Plot ==
Akhila arranges Anand's marriage with Priyanka Varma, who is later revealed to be from Thrichambaram's rival family, Nagamadam. Akhila kicks Priyanka out of the marriage hall, which causes her to vow revenge. On the same day, Aravind (Anand's brother) is also arranged to marry Nandana. Akhila cancels the marriage, despite Anand's insistence otherwise.

Anand's friend, Sabari, proclaims that Anand loves Kalyani. Anand denies this, even though it is true. Das (Kalyani's father), who knows that she loves Anand, made her a promise that she will marry Chandran (Vilasini's nephew from Mumbai). Meanwhile, Anand proposes to her. Kalyani, who respects Akhila, decides to perform Satyapramana Vratham, a three-day Hindu penance without food or drink. According to the rules of Vratham, doing this grants the penitent whatever they ask for, but the head of the victim's family (the Thrichambarams) must give a glass of milk to the penitent to finish the vratham. Kalyani requests that her marriage with Chandran continue, which devastates Anand. Vilasini poisons Kalyani's milk, causing her to collapse as Anand confronts her about their break-up.

Seeing Chandran and Kalyani's marriage, Priyanka plots to kill Kalyani. Priyanka's goon kidnaps Kalyani, leaving her to die in the water tank of Trichambaram's home. In the morning, Vilasini asks Sujata to turn on the water pump, which causes Kalyani to nearly drown. Fortunately, she is saved by Anand. Soon, Chandran is revealed to be an imposter who has destroyed several women's lives by marrying them and taking them to Mumbai to sell them to sex traffickers. On the day of Kalyani's marriage, a woman named Sophia appears before Chandran and confronts him, to which Chandran responds by knocking her unconscious. Later, at the moment of tying the mangal sutra, Sophia appears and reveals everything, causing the marriage to end.

Kalyani and Anand start to grow closer, and Anand reveals his affection for Kalyani to Akhila. This is when Ganga, Priyanka's younger sister, enters Trichambaram. She has stolen Kalyani's horoscope, which is perfectly matched with Anand, to gain Akhila's approval. Akhila selects Ganga as the bride for Anand. Yet Anand declares in a press conference that the person who wins the "Best Brand Ambassador" title will be his wife. Anand secretly makes Kalyani live in his room to practice for the final item: a dance competition. Meanwhile, Ganga tries to kill Anand's father but is saved by Kalyani, who catches her. Kalyani wins the Brand Ambassador Title but Ganga threatens to commit suicide unless she is arranged with Anand, forcing Akhila's hand. In turn, Kalyani's marriage is fixed with Neeraj. Anand, with the help of a Mumbai-based detective Gireesh Menon, learns the truth about Ganga. When Gireesh attempts to hand over Ganga's details to Anand, the file is taken by Priyanka's goon.

During the night before the wedding, Vilasini kidnaps Kalyani's younger brother, Aniyankuttan, and makes Kalyani write a letter stating that she is leaving. Vilasini tells Kalyani to go to a broken house behind the Vilipuram Devi Temple. Vilasini disrobes Kalyani so she can't run away, but Anand rescues her. Anand marries Kalyani, and his marriage to Ganga is cancelled due to a smoke explosion created by his friends Aravind and Subaru. Meanwhile, Neeraj, who is Anand's friend, cancels his wedding with Kalyani. Vilasini then attempts to incite doubts in Akhila's mind regarding Kalyani and Anand's relationship. Akhila consults an astrologer, who predicts that Anand had married Kalyani.

Priyanka tries to run over Akhila with a car but accidentally hits Kalyani, injuring her leg. The doctors say that Kalyani needs an operation to walk properly. Priyanka's ally, Sreenivas, bribes the anesthesiologist, who gives Kalyani an overdose of anaesthesia. Vilasini makes Akhila once more doubt Kalyani and Anand's relation, though this time Akhila concludes that they both love each other. Anand decides to reveal the truth about Ganga to Akhila. She comes up with a plan, and continues to prepare Anand and Ganga's marriage. She also fixes Kalyani's marriage with Rishikesh, who was Priyanka's ally. On the day of marriage, Anand decides not to go to the auditorium and tells Kalyani to do so. Das forcefully takes a reluctant Kalyani to the wedding hall. Akhila threatens to kill herself if there is any disruption during the marriage, which creates a quandary for Kalyani. Anand's friend SI Shivadas collects all information regarding Ganga, by trapping her as a criminal in a fake car accident, and submits all the evidence to prove Ganga's relation with Priyanka. Priyanka and her allies are arrested and the marriages are cancelled. Anand arrives, along with his father, and rushes to Akhila to disclose his marriage with Kalyani. Akhila is upset upon hearing the news, and her worries intensify on seeing Kalyani's mangala sutra. Akhila attempts suicide but is saved by Anand. Kalyani, blaming herself for all this, unties her mangala sutra and poisons herself. Through many prayers, she survives.

Kalyani enters the Trichambalam family despite Akhila's disapproval. Eventually, Anand could not take the constant shaming from his mother about his wife, so he resigns from his job as CEO and moves out with Kalyani. The show continues with Akhila trying to win her son back, even setting him up to marry another woman (Vydehi), but Anand continues to stand with Kalyani.

== Cast ==
=== Main ===
- Amala Gireesan as Kalyani Anand Krishnan, Anand's wife, and the daughter of Das. She is a young and beautiful village girl, who is employed by Akhila as her home cook. She is the eldest daughter-in-law of Akhilandeshwari and Krishnan.
- Aishwariyaa Bhaskaran (2018–2020) / Thara Kalyan(2020–2022) as Thrichambalath Akhilandeshwari (Akhila)/ Rajaeshwari (dual role): she is the mother of Anand and Aravind, the Mother-in-law of Kalyani and Nandana, and the wife of Krishnan. She is the de facto head of the house.
- Stebin Jacob as Anand Krishnan, the elder son of Akhilandeshwari and Krishnan. She is the caring and lovable Husband of Kalyani.
- Nikitha Murali as geethanjali.

=== Recurring ===
- Prabhin as Aravind Krishnan, the younger son of Akhilandeshwari and Krishnan, and husband of Nandana.
- Yavanika Gopalakrishnan as Das, Kannan and Kalyani's father.
- Sajana Chandran as Krishnan, Akhila's husband.
- Blessy Kurien as Nandana Aravind Krishnan, Aravind's wife, and youngest daughter-in-law of Akilandeshwari and Krishnan.
- Sree Padma as Vilasini, Akhila's sister.
- Neethu Thomas (2018–2020) / Caroline (2020) / Neethu Thomas (2021–present) as Priyanka Varma, Anand's ex-fiancé.
- Haritha Nair as Ganga Varma ("Silky Ganga"), Anand's ex-fiancée, and sister of Priyanka.
- Keerthi Gopinath as Subaru, Anand's best friend.
- Sumi Rashik as Jayanthi Rajeev, Vilasini's niece, and wife of Rajeev.
- Vineeth as Sabari, Anand's friend.
- Arun Mohan as Rajeevan, Jayanthi's husband.
- Regina Sunil as Sujatha, Maid of Thrichambarath house.
- Akshay as Aniyankuttan, Kalyani's younger brother.
- Archana Menon as Maheshwari, Nandana's mother.
- Sini Prasad as Ganga's fake mother
- Amboori Jayan as Giriraja Varma, Priyanka's uncle.
- Leela Panicker as Appachiyamma.
- Souparnika Subhash as Vyjayanthi.
- Nandhansenanipuram as Anandh, Krishnan's friend.

=== Guest appearance ===
- Shiju as Ravichandra Varman (Party episode/episode 926-927/episode 950)
- Sushmitha Prabhakaran as Sreelakshmi (Party episode)
- Arun G Raghavan as Abhimanyu (Party episode)
- Srinish Aravind as Sudhi (Party episode)

== Adaptations ==
Language	Title	Original release	Network(s)	Last aired	Notes
Telugu	Muddha Mandaram ముద్ద మందిరం	17 November 2014	Zee Telugu	27 December 2019	Original
Tamil	Sembaruthi செம்பருத்தி	16 October 2017	Zee Tamil	31 July 2022	Remake
Malayalam	Chembarathi ചെമ്പരത്തി	26 November 2018	Zee Keralam	25 March 2022	Remake
Kannada	Paaru ಪಾರು	3 December 2018	Zee Kannada	16 March 2024	Remake
Marathi	Paaru पारू	12 February 2024	Zee Marathi	10 February 2026	Remake
Hindi	Vasudha वसुधा	16 September 2024	Zee TV	Ongoing	Remake

== Legacy ==
In November 2025, Zee Keralam premiered a new television series titled Chembarathy. Although it shares its title and the name of its central character, Kalyani, with the original series, it features a different storyline and cast. The new series is an adaptation of the Telugu television series Chamanthi and is not a continuation of the original series.
