= Paaru =

Paaru may refer to:

- Paaru (2018 TV series), 2018 television series in Kannada language.
- Paaru (2024 TV series), 2024 television series in Marathi language.
