= Vasudha (TV Series) =

Indian Hindi-language soap opera

- Genre: Family drama
- Created by: Arvind Babbal
- Story by: Rekha Babbal
- Directed by: Arvind Babbal
- Creative director: Tanu Tiwari
- Starring: Priya Thakur; Abhishek Sharma; Nausheen Ali Sardar; Parineeta Borthakur
- Composer: Paresh Shah
- Country of origin: India
- Original language: Hindi
- No. of episodes: 723

Production
- Producer: Arvind Babbal
- Production location: Udaipur
- Cinematography: Manish Yadav; Pawan Gupta; Madan M. Gupta
- Camera setup: Multi-camera
- Running time: 22 minutes
- Production company: Arvind Babbal Productions

Original release
- Network: Zee TV
- Release: 16 September 2024 – present

Related
- Muddha Mandaram

Vasudha is an Indian Hindi-language television drama series that premiered from 16 September 2024 on Zee TV and streams digitally on ZEE5. Produced by Arvind Babbal, the series is an official remake of the Telugu TV series Muddha Mandaram of Zee Telugu and stars Priya Thakur, and Abhishek Sharma in lead roles.

== Premise ==
Vasudha, a happy-go-lucky maid, joins business leader Chandrika's home. Despite their ideological differences, she seeks Chandrika's approval and struggles to fit into her elite world.

== Cast ==
=== Main ===
- Priya Thakur as Vasudha "Vasu" Solanki Singh Chauhan: Hanumant's daughter; Raghu's sister; Devansh's wife (2024–present)
- Abhishek Sharma as Devansh "Dev" Singh Chauhan: Chandrika and Prabhat's elder son; Avinash's brother; Vasudha's husband (2024–present)

=== Recurring ===
- Nausheen Ali Sardar/Parineeta Borthakur as Chandrika "Chanda" Singh Chauhan: Prabhat's wife, Devansh and Avinash's mother (2024–2025)/(2025–present)
- Sachin Parikh as Prabhat Singh Chauhan: Santosh's son; Mayur's brother; Chandrika's husband; Devansh and Avinash's father (2024–present)
- Kiran Bhargava as Santosh Singh Chauhan: Prabhat and Mayur's mother; Devansh and Avinash's grandmother (2026–present)
- Ishank Saluja as Avinash Singh Chauhan: Chandrika and Prabhat's younger son, Divya's husband (2024–present)
- Shubhanshi Raghuvanshi as Divya Singh Chauhan: Avinash's wife (2024–present)
- Arvind Choudhary as Mayur Singh Chauhan: Santosh's son; Prabhat's brother; Sarika's husband (2024–present)
- Minal Bal as Sarika Singh Chauhan: Mayur's wife (2024–present)
- Ashish Shukla as Hanumant Solanki: Vasudha and Raghu's father (2024–present)
- Subhan Khan as Raghu Solanki: Hanumant's son; Vasudha's brother (2024)
- Sheeba Azhar Samrat as Savitri Bua (2024–present)
- Poonam Dwivedi as Uma (2024)
- Rajesh Jais as Surya Singh Rathod (2025)
- Pratiksha Rai as Karishma Singh Shekhawat: Megha's elder sister (2024–2025;2025–2026)
- Mandeep Kaur as Megha Singh Shekhawat: Karishma's sister (2025)
- Kunwar Vikram Soni as Madhav: Vasudha's friend (2024–2025)
- Nishi Saxena as Nandini Oberoi: Maya's daughter (2025–present)
- Shweta Ojha as Maya Oberoi: Nandini's mother (2025–present)
- Puneet Sachdev as Karanveer Singh: Vidhi's brother (2025)
- Ankita Bahuguna as Vidhi Singh: Karanveer's sister (2025)
- Neelu Vaghela as Mrs. Mehta (2025)
- Soni Patel as Anamika: Sweetu's mother (2025–2026)
- Siyal Jain as Sweetu: Anamika's daughter (2025–2026)
- Parichay Sharma as Samar Sisodia:(2026–present)
- Surbhi Mittal as Phool (2026–present)
- Kamya Panjabi as Rudraani Singh Shekhawat: Mohit's mother; (2026–present)
- Sajjad Nyk as Mohit Singh Shekhawat: Rudraani's son (2026–present)
- Keshav Aswani as Ranveer Singh Rathod (2026–present)

=== Guest appearances ===
- Ayushi Khurana as Reet Chaudhary from Jaane Anjaane Hum Mile (2025)
- Bharat Ahlawat as Raghav Suryavanshi from Jaane Anjaane Hum Mile (2025)
- Jayati Bhatia as Sharda Suryavanshi from Jaane Anjaane Hum Mile (2025)
- Sehaj Rajput as Unnati Chaudhary from Jaane Anjaane Hum Mile (2025)
- Rohit Dhiman as Dhruv Chaudhary from Jaane Anjaane Hum Mile (2025)
- Samaksh Sudi as Virendra Suryavanshi from Jaane Anjaane Hum Mile (2025)
- Kalpana Sisodia as Poonam Suryavanshi from Jaane Anjaane Hum Mile (2025)
- Rohan Rai as Pratik Suryavanshi from Jaane Anjaane Hum Mile (2025)
- Divya Choudhary as Divya Suryavanshi from Jaane Anjaane Hum Mile (2025)
- Shalini Ramchandran as Neeta Chawla from Jaane Anjaane Hum Mile (2025)
- Sonakshi Batra as Jagadhatri "JD" Naik from Jagadhatri (2026)
- Ayushman Khurana as Himself to promote Yeh Prem Mol Liya (2026)
- Sharvari Wagh as Herself to promote Yeh Prem Mol Liya (2026)

== Production ==
=== Casting ===
Abhishek Sharma was signed to play male lead, Devansh "Dev" Singh Chauhan. Priya Thakur was roped in to play the female lead, Vasudha Solanki. Kunwar Vikram Soni was confirmed to play Madhav. Nausheen Ali Sardar joined the cast as Chandrika, marking her television comeback after 2 years. Sheeba Azhar Samrat portraying Savitri Bua, was also confirmed. In April 2025, Pratiksha Rai was selected to play Karishma. Alongside her, Mandeep Kaur was cast as Megha, Karishma's sister. In the same month, Rajesh Jais was cast as Surya Singh Rathod. In July 2025, Sardar quit the series and replaced by Parineeta Borthakur. In October 2025, three people joined the cast–Puneet Sachdev as Karanveer, Ankita Bahuguna as Vidhi Singh and Nishi Saxena as Nandini.

In March 2026, Kiran Bhargava joined the cast. Later May, Parichay Sharma entered the show as Samar Sisodia. In November 2026, Kamya Panjabi joined the show as Rudraani Singh Shekhawat.

== Reception ==
=== Ratings ===
After initially averaging a 0.9–1.1 TRP, Vasudha surged to 1.5 TRP in July 2025. The show climbed further to 1.7 TRP, eventually reaching a peak of 2.0 in May 2026.

Week	Year	BARC Viewership		Ref.
Week	Year	TRP	Ranking	Ref.
Week 14	2026	1.9	2	
Week 17	2026	1.8	1	
Week 18	2026	2.0	1	
Week 19	2026	1.8	1	
Week 20	2026	1.9	1	
Week 21	2026	1.9	1	
Week 22	2026	1.9	2	
Week 23	2026	1.8	2	
Week 24	2026	1.8	2	

== Adaptations ==
Language	Title	Original release	Network(s)	Last aired	Notes
Telugu	Muddha Mandaram ముద్ద మందిరం	17 November 2014	Zee Telugu	27 December 2019	Original
Tamil	Sembaruthi செம்பருத்தி	16 October 2017	Zee Tamil	31 July 2022	Remake
Malayalam	Chembarathi ചെമ്പരത്തി	26 November 2018	Zee Keralam	25 March 2022	Remake
Kannada	Paaru ಪಾರು	3 December 2018	Zee Kannada	16 March 2024	Remake
Marathi	Paaru पारू	12 February 2024	Zee Marathi	10 February 2026	Remake
Hindi	Vasudha वसुधा	16 September 2024	Zee TV	Ongoing	Remake
