= Paaru (2024 TV series) =

2024 Indian Marathi language TV series

- Genre: Drama
- Written by: Kiran Kulkarni
- Directed by: Raju Sawant
- Starring: See below
- Country of origin: India
- Original language: Marathi
- No. of episodes: 681

Production
- Producer: Sarita Tejendra Neswankar
- Production locations: Satara, Maharashtra
- Camera setup: Multi-camera
- Running time: 22 minutes
- Production company: Trrump Carrd Production

Original release
- Network: Zee Marathi
- Release: 12 February 2024 – 10 February 2026

Related
- Muddha Mandaram

Paaru is an Indian Marathi language TV series which aired on Zee Marathi. It is an official remake of Zee Telugu's TV series Muddha Mandaram. It starred Sharayu Sonawane, Prasad Jawade and Mugdha Karnik in lead roles. It premiered from 12 February 2024 along with Shiva.

It is produced by Sarita Neswankar and directed by Raju Sawant under the banner of Trrump Carrd Production. The show went abruptly off aired on 10 February 2026 without completing its story.

== Plot ==
Paaru, a simple girl, is in awe of Ahilyadevi, a tycoon who commands respect from others around her. A misunderstanding occurs when their paths cross, prompting Paaru to win Ahilyadevi over.

== Cast ==
=== Main ===
- Sharayu Sonawane as Parvati Maruti Semse / Parvati Aditya Kirloskar (Paaru)
- Prasad Jawade as Aditya Shrikant Kirloskar
- Mugdha Karnik as Ahilyadevi Shrikant Kirloskar

=== Recurring ===
Kirloskar family

- Vijay Patwardhan as Shrikant Kirloskar
- Anuj Salunkhe as Pritam Shrikant Kirloskar
- Sanjana Kale as Priya Sayajirao Bhosale / Priya Pritam Kirloskar
- Shantanu Gangane / Swapnil Ajgaonkar as Mohan Kirloskar
- Shrutkirti Sawant as Damini Mohan Kirloskar

Others

- Bharat Jadhav as Suryakant Kadam
- Sunil Barve as Sayajirao Bhosale
- Devdatta Ghone as Ganesh Maruti Semse (Gani)
- Atul Kaswa as Maruti Semse
- Shripad Panase as Pratap Sayaji Bhosale
- Prajakta Wadye as Savitri
- Saksham Kulkarni as Paritosh
- Pari Telang as Meera
- Purva Shinde as Disha
- Nikhil Zope as Mihir
- Sachin Deshpande as Ajay
- Aatish More as Harish
- Anup Belwalkar as Vishal
- Shweta Kharat as Anushka
- Arjun Kusumbe as Rushikesh
- Bhavika Nikam as Monika
- Shraddha Mahajan as Sajiri
- Rugved Phadke as Nanu

=== Cameo Appearances ===
- Madhugandha Kulkarni as Kalindi Dharmadhikari
- Nirmiti Sawant as Padmavati Ghorpade
- Nagesh Bhonsle as Vishwambhar Thakur
- Akshata Ukirade as Kiyara Vishwambhar Thakur
- Ramesh Wani as Rupesh Kirkire
- Vijaya Babar as Kamli Mohite

== Awards ==
Zee Marathi Utsav Natyancha Awards
Awards	Category	Recipient	Role	Ref.
2024	Best Actor	Prasad Jawade	Aditya Kirloskar	
2024	Best Daughter	Sharayu Sonawane	Parvati Semse (Paaru)	
2024	ZEE5 Popular Character Female	Sharayu Sonawane	Parvati Semse (Paaru)	
2024	Best Comedy Female	Shrutkirti Sawant	Damini Kirloskar	
2024	Best Family		Kirloskar Family	
2024	Best Series	Sarita Neswankar	Producer	
2024	Best Supporting Male	Anuj Salunkhe	Pritam Kirloskar	
2024	Best Mother	Mugdha Karnik	Ahilyadevi Kirloskar	
2025	Best Son	Prasad Jawade	Aditya Kirloskar	
2025	Best Daughter	Sharayu Sonawane	Parvati Semse (Paaru)	
Ugach	Best Bhapav	Shrutkirti Sawant	Damini Kirloskar	
Ugach	Best Yeh Catch Nahi Match Hai	Prasad Jawade	Aditya Kirloskar	
Ugach	Best Maza Chakula	Prasad Jawade	Aditya Kirloskar	
Ugach	Best Natta-Patta	Sharayu Sonawane	Parvati Kirloskar (Paaru)	

== Reception ==
=== Mahasangam ===
Date	Series	Ref.
28 October-2 November 2024	Savalyachi Janu Savali	
12-17 May 2025	Savalyachi Janu Savali	
13-19 October 2025	Savalyachi Janu Savali	
26 January-1 February 2025	Lakshmi Niwas	
27 July-2 August 2025	Lakshmi Niwas	

=== Special episodes (1 hour) ===
- 13 April 2025
- 13 July 2025

=== Airing history ===
No.	Airing Date	Days	Time (IST)	Ref.
1	12 February 2024 – 9 August 2025	Daily	7.30 pm	
2	11 August 2025 – 17 January 2026	Daily	7 pm	
3	19 January – 10 February 2026	Mon-Fri	11 pm	

== Adaptations ==
Language	Title	Original release	Network(s)	Last aired	Notes	Ref.
Telugu	Muddha Mandaram ముద్ద మందారం	17 November 2014	Zee Telugu	27 December 2019	Original	
Tamil	Sembaruthi செம்பருத்தி	16 October 2017	Zee Tamil	31 July 2022	Remake	
Malayalam	Chembarathi ചെമ്പരത്തി	26 November 2018	Zee Keralam	25 March 2022	Remake	
Kannada	Paaru ಪಾರು	3 December 2018	Zee Kannada	16 March 2024	Remake	
Marathi	Paaru पारू	12 February 2024	Zee Marathi	10 February 2026	Remake	
Hindi	Vasudha वसुधा	16 September 2024	Zee TV	Ongoing	Remake	
Punjabi	Kashni ਕਾਸ਼ਨੀ	31 March 2025	Zee Punjabi	31 May 2025	Remake	
Bengali	Kusum কুসুম	4 June 2025	Zee Bangla	Ongoing	Remake	
Odia	Shrabani ଶ୍ରାବଣୀ	13 July 2026	Zee Sarthak	Ongoing	Remake	
