= Mansi Joshi (actress) =

Indian actress

- Born: Mansi Joshi; 5 September 1994 (age 32); Bangalore, Karnataka
- Occupation: Actress
- Years active: 2018–present
- Known for: Mr. Manaivi; Paaru; Anna Thangi; Chandrikayilaliyunna Chandrakantham

Mansi Joshi is an Indian actress who works in the Kannada, Telugu, Tamil and Malayalam television industries. She made her debut in the Kannada TV series Radha Ramana on Colors Kannada. She is known for playing the lead roles in the TV series Mr. Manaivi, Anna Thangi, Paaru, and Chandrikayilaliyunna Chandrakantham.

== Personal life ==
Mansi Joshi was born on 5 September 1994, in Bengaluru, Karnataka.

Mansi Joshi got engaged to her long-time partner, Raghava, on October 20, 2024, in an intimate ceremony held in Bengaluru. The couple got to married on 18 February 2025.

== Career ==
She is known for her performances in popular television serials such as Paaru, and Anbudan Kushi, Chandrikayilaliyunna Chandrakantham. In addition to acting, Mansi has a background in modeling and is a trained dancer.

== Television ==
Year	Show	Role	Language	Channel	Notes	Ref.
2018–2019	Radha Ramana	Raman's sister	Kannada	Colors Kannada	Replaced Raksha	
2018-2024	Paaru	Anushka	Kannada	Zee Kannada		
2020	Anbudan Kushi	Kushi	Tamil	Star Vijay	Replaced by Reshma Venkatesh	
2021–2022	Anna Thangi	Sandhya	Kannada	Udaya TV	Replaced by Jessica	
2020–2022	Devatha – Anubandhala Alayam	Satya	Telugu	Star Maa		
2020–2021	Amrutha Varshini		Telugu	Gemini TV		
2023–2024	Mr. Manaivi	Swetha	Tamil	Sun TV		
2023–2024	Geethanjali	Shruti	Telugu	Gemini TV		
2024–2025	Chandrikayilaliyunna Chandrakantham	Alakananda	Malayalam	Asianet	Replaced Lakshmi Priya	
2024	Myna	Radha	Kannada	Udaya TV		
2024–2025	Bhairavi	Bhairavi	Telugu	Gemini TV	Replaced by Anjana Srinivas	
2025–2026	Jodi Hakki	Akshara	Kannada	Zee Power		
2026–present	Adi Lakshmi Purana	Amrutha	Kannada	Zee Kannada	Replaced Rakshita	

== Music video ==
- Radhe Radhe (2021)

== Controversy ==
On 20 July 2020, Mansi revealed through social media that she has been cyberbullying by an unknown person who spreads fake information about her. She also filed a police complaint regarding the matter.
