= Vikash Uthaiah =

Indian actor

- Born: Kodagu, Karnataka, India
- Occupation: Actor
- Years active: 2021–present
- Known for: Annayya

Vikash Uthaiah is an Indian actor who works primarily in the Kannada film and television industry. He is known for portraying Shivanna in the Zee Kannada television series Annayya and for appearing in Kannada films including Aana (2021), Mary, and Apaayavide Eccharike.

== Early life ==
Vikash Uthaiah is from Kodagu district, Karnataka. He completed a Bachelor of Laws (LL.B.) before pursuing a career in acting.

== Career ==
Uthaiah began his acting career in theatre before making his feature film debut in the Kannada film Aana (2021), in which he played the lead role of Raaki opposite Aditi Prabhudeva.

In 2024, he was cast as Shivanna in the Zee Kannada television serial Annayya, marking his breakthrough on television.

In 2025, he appeared in the Kannada horror thriller Apaayavide Eccharike.

He also appeared in the Kannada short film Dwandwam Dwayam, directed by Mann Chengappa.

== Filmography ==
=== Films ===
Year	Title	Role	Director	Notes
2021	Aana	Raaki	Manoj P. Nadalumane	Lead role
2023	Mary	SI Ravikumar	Manoj P. Nadalumane	Lead role
2025	Apaayavide Eccharike	Suri	Abhijith Thirthahalli	Lead role

=== Short films ===
Year	Title	Role
2024	Dwandwam Dwayam	Surya

=== Television ===
Year	Title	Role	Network
2024–present	Annayya	Shivanna	Zee Kannada
