= Mr. Manaivi =

- Genre: Romance; Drama
- Written by: Dialogue; Rathi Bala
- Screenplay by: Rathi Bala
- Directed by: Sulaimaan (Episode 1-225 & 474); A. Jawahar (November 7th 2023 to July 29th 2024; Episode 226 to 473 approx.)
- Starring: Shabana Shahjahan; Pavan Ravindra
- Theme music composer: Visu
- Opening theme: "Kaatre Poongatre"; Sridhar Ramesh; M.M Monisha (Vocal); Pa. Vijay (Lyrics)
- Country of origin: India
- Original language: Tamil
- No. of seasons: 1
- No. of episodes: 619

Production
- Producer: Vaidehi Ramamurthy
- Cinematography: Vinoth Bharathi
- Editor: Deepak Babu
- Camera setup: Multi-camera
- Running time: approx.20–22 minutes per episode
- Production companies: Sun Entertainment; Vision Time India Private Limited

Original release
- Network: Sun TV
- Release: 6 March 2023 – 22 December 2024

Mr. Manaivi (transl. Mister/Mr. Wife) was an Indian Tamil-language television series which premiered on 6 March 2023 replacing Kannana Kanne serial and ended on 22 December 2024 replaced by Ethirneechal Thodargiradhu in Sun TV from Monday to Sunday. The show starred Shabana Shahjahan Aryan; with Pavan Ravindra in the lead roles.

== Synopsis ==
The story revolves around a newly married couple as they face challenges and problems in their daily life. Anjali (Shabana Shajahan Aryan), a strong and independent woman, who expects equality in the society, manages her life on her own, while Vicky (Pavan Ravindra), who aspires to be a Homemaker (Mr Homemaker / Mr. Manaivi), faces many issues in his role of Homemaker. The main plot revolved around this theme.

== Cast ==
=== Main ===
- Debjani Modak as Anjalidevi alias Anjali VigneshKumar: Vicky's wife; Ranjitham's granddaughter
  - Shabana Shajahan Aryan as Anjalidevi alias Anjali VigneshKumar
- Pavan Ravindra as Vigneshkumar alias Vicky (Mr. Manaivi): Anjali's husband; Maragatham's grandson; Swetha's ex-love interest (2023–2024)

=== Recurring ===
- Anuradha as Ranjitham: Anjali's grandmother; Vedhanayagam's mother (2023–2024)
- Sabitha Anand as Gunavathi Sivakumar alias (Guna): Sivakumar's Second wife; Anjali's step mother, Kavi malar's mother (2023–2024)(Antagonist)
- Smriti Kashyap / VJ Keerthi as Kavi Malar Sivakumar: Anjali's half-sister (2023–2024)(Antagonist)
- Jeeva Ravi as Sivakumar alias (Siva): Muthulakshmi's Widower and Gunavathi's Husband, Anjali's and Kavi Malar's father (2023–2024)
- Lakshmi Vasudevan as Gayathri: Sivakumar's sister Anjali and Kavi Malar's Paternal aunt, Muthulakshmi and Gunavathi's Sister-in-law (2023-2024)
- Latha Sathupathy as Maragatham: Vicky, Naresh and Viji's grandmother; Rajmohan and Chandramohan's mother (2023–2024)
- Balaji Thiyagarajan Dayalan as Mahesh: Kavi Malar's fiancé (Dead)
- Tharani as Chitra: Vedhanayagam's wife, Anjali's Maternal aunt (2023–2024)
- Sree Priya as Sathya: Vedhanayagam's daughter (2023)
- Sanjay Kumar Asrani as Rajmohan: Vicky's father (2023–2024)
- Rajkanth as Chandramohan: Rajmohan's brother; Vicky's uncle (2023–2024)
- Ammu Ramachandran as Saranya Chandramohan: Vicky's aunt (2023–2024)
- VJ Aswath as Nareshkumar Chandramohan alias Naresh: Chandramohan's son, Viji's brother and Vicky's younger cousin brother (2023)
- Punitha Balakrishnan Character Replacement Jayashree as Vijayalakshmi Chandramohan alias Viji: Naresh's younger sister and Vicky's younger cousin sister (2023)
- Tamil Selvan as Paper rose: Anjali's friend work mate (2023–2024)
- Jenny as Anu: Anjali's friend and work mate (2023–2024)
- A. Venkatesh as Vedhanayagam: Ranjitham's elder son; Anjali's maternal uncle (2023)
- Lokesh Baskaran as Akilan Vedhanayagam: Anjali's ex-fiancé; Vedhanayagam's son (2023)
- Mansi Joshi as Swetha: Anjali's arch-rival (2023)
- Bhanumathy as Karthigai Srinivasan: Swetha's mother (2023)
- V.Dasarathy as Srinivasan: Swetha's father; Rajmohan's friend (2023)
- Shravnitha as Vennila: Anjali's neighbour (2023)
- Sabari as Anjali's neighbour and enemy; Vedhanayagam's friend (2023)

=== Special appearances ===
- Gayatri Jayaraman as Muthulakshmi Sivakumar: Sivakumar's first wife; Anjali's mother (Dead; Photographic Appearance)
- Samyuktha as Child Anjali (2023)
- Aalam as Child Vicky (2023)
- Maanya Anand as Tulasi (2023)
- Ashwanth Karthi as Rajapandi (2023)
- Chaitra Reddy as Kayal (2023)
- Aravind Akash as Advocate Surya (2023)
- Geetha Ravishanker as Surya's mother (2023)

== Production ==
=== Development ===
On end 2022, Sun Network confirmed through a press release that it would distribute new Tamil serial, to be produced by Vision Time India Pvt Ltd. Initially, the title of the serial was named Jodi. Later renamed as Mr.Manaivi.

=== Casting ===
Sembaruthi fame Shabana Shajahan was cast in the female lead role as Anjali However, she left the show in May 2024, because of some reason. Actor Kavyanjali fame Pavan Ravindra plays the title role alongside her, making his debut in Tamil television dramas. Kannada actress Maansi Joshi was selected to portray the main antagonist. Actress Anuradha was cast as Ranjitham, who is Anjali's grandmother, Latha was cast as Maragatham and A. Venkatesh was cast as Vedhanayagam. In end of September 2023, Actor Aravind Akash was cast in cameo.

In begin December 2023, Actress Smriti joins the cast as Kavi Malar. However, in end of October, Smriti portraying Kavi Malar quit the series and VJ Keerthi replaced her.

=== Release ===
The first promo was released on 20 February 2023, in which we see the protagonist, two grandmothers in a temple talking about their grandchildren.

== Airing history ==
The show started airing on Sun TV on 6 March 2023 From Monday to Saturday at 20:30 (IST) replacing Kannana Kanne time slot. From Monday 2 October 2023, the show was shifted to 22:00 (IST) replacing Anbe Vaa time slot. and later it aired at 22:30.

== Reception ==
The show got a TVR of 8.95 in July 2023 becoming the channel's No 5 series. And became the No 6 serial of all Tamil serial U+R market. In April 2023, ETimes TV conducted a poll to find the TV show that is the Tamil audience's favourite television show. Interestingly, the romantic love drama series 'Mr. Manaivi' got 46% of the netizens shared that their favourite show.

== Adaptations ==
Language	Title	Original release	Network(s)	Last aired	Notes	Ref.
Malayalam	Ninnishtam Ennishtam നിന്നിഷ്ടം എന്നിഷ്ടം	7 August 2023	Surya TV	20 January 2024	Remake	
Kannada	Preetiya Arasi ಪ್ರೀತಿಯ ಅರಸಿ	16 October 2023	Udaya TV	14 January 2024	Remake	
