= Amulya Gowda =

Indian actress

Amulya Omkar Gowda
- Born: Mysore
- Occupation: Actress
- Years active: 2014- Present
- Known for: Kamali
- Television: Zee Kannada

Amulya Gowda is an Indian television actress who popularly known by her serial Kamali which aired on Zee Kannada. She works in the Kannada and Telugu languages serials.

== Life and career ==
She began her career by appearing in Kannada television serials such as "Swathi Muttu", "Punar Vivaha", and "Aramane". However, it was her role as the lead actress in the popular serial "Kamali" that brought her widespread recognition and fame.

== Television ==
Serials
Year	Program	Role	Language	Channel	Notes
2014	Swathi Muttu	Paaru	Kannada	Star Suvarna	
2018	Aramane		Kannada	Udaya TV	
2018–2022	Kamali	Kamali	Kannada	Zee Kannada	
2021	Punar Vivaha	Swathi	Kannada	Zee Kannada	
2022	Karthika Deepam	Sourya	Telugu	Star Maa	
2023–present	Gundeninda Gudigantalu	Meena	Telugu	Star Maa	
2024	Shri Gowri	Gowri	Kannada	Colors Kannada	
2026–present	Mahalakshmi Maduve	Mahalakshmi	Kannada	Sun Udaya	

Reality show
Year	Program	Channel	Note	Ref.
2011	Yariguntu Yarigilla	Zee Kannada	herself	
2022	Bigg Boss season 9	Colors Kannada	herself	
