= Muddha Mandaram =

Indian Telugu language TV series

- Genre: Drama; Romance
- Starring: See below
- Country of origin: India
- Original language: Telugu
- No. of episodes: 1585

Production
- Producer: Akkineni Nagarjuna
- Production locations: Hyderabad, Telangana
- Camera setup: Multi-camera
- Running time: 22 minutes
- Production company: Annapurna Studios

Original release
- Network: Zee Telugu
- Release: 17 November 2014 – 27 December 2019

Muddha Mandaram (transl. Lumpy Hibiscus) is an Indian Telugu language TV series which aired on Zee Telugu. It premiered from 17 November 2014 and ended its 5-year long successful journey on 27 December 2019. One of the longest running Telugu television soap opera, the series stars Thanuja Puttaswamy, Pawon Sai and Haritha in lead roles. It is produced under the banner of Annapurna Studios.

== Plot ==
The story revolves around Akhilandeshwari and Parvathi, two strong-willed women and their conflicts. The show explores the mindset and class conflict of two diverse personalities and how issues spiral out of control and affect their relationships.

== Cast ==
- Thanuja Puttaswamy as Parvathi (Paaru)
- Pawon Sai as Deva
- Haritha as Akhilandeshwari
- Goparaju Ramana
- Sandra Jaichandran

== Adaptations ==
Language	Title	Original release	Network(s)	Last aired	Notes
Telugu	Muddha Mandaram ముద్ద మందారం	17 November 2014	Zee Telugu	27 December 2019	Original
Tamil	Sembaruthi செம்பருத்தி	16 October 2017	Zee Tamil	31 July 2022	Remake
Malayalam	Chembarathi ചെമ്പരത്തി	26 November 2018	Zee Keralam	25 March 2022	Remake
Kannada	Paaru ಪಾರು	3 December 2018	Zee Kannada	16 March 2024	Remake
Marathi	Paaru पारू	12 February 2024	Zee Marathi	10 February 2026	Remake
Hindi	Vasudha वसुधा	16 September 2024	Zee TV	Ongoing	Remake
Punjabi	Kashni ਕਾਸ਼ਨੀ	31 March 2025	Zee Punjabi	31 May 2025	Remake
Bengali	Kusum কুসুম	4 June 2025	Zee Bangla	Ongoing	Remake
