= Amruthadhaare =

2023 Indian Kannada language TV series

- Genre: Drama
- Developed by: Ekta Kapoor
- Written by: Goutam Vakhaari; Mahesh Rao
- Directed by: Guruprasad Mudenahalli
- Starring: See below
- Country of origin: India
- Original language: Kannada
- No. of episodes: 1123

Production
- Producers: Keerti M Rao, Prakash Agara
- Production locations: Bengaluru, Karnataka
- Editor: Shashank Venky
- Camera setup: Multi-camera
- Running time: 22 minutes
- Production company: Keerthi Akshaya Network

Original release
- Network: Zee Kannada
- Release: 29 May 2023 – 15 November 2026

Related
- Bade Achhe Lagte Hain

Amruthadhaare is an Indian Kannada language drama series premiered on 29 May 2023 on Zee Kannada. The show is an official remake of SET's Hindi series Bade Achhe Lagte Hain. It stars Chaya Singh and Rajesh Nataranga in lead roles. One of the longest running Kannada television soap opera, the series went off air on 15 November 2026.

== Plot ==
45 year old Goutham Diwan is an unmarried, wealthy, established, and well-reputed Bangalore-based businessman and the Chairman of Diwan Groups. 35 year old Bhoomika Sadashiva is a college lecturer and comes from a middle-class family. Goutham's stepmother Shakuntala only uses him for money and is responsible for Goutham being unmarried. Shakunthala's elder son Jaidev aka Jai is similar to his mother and at times can be more cruel than her. Shakuntala's brother Lakshmikanth is always concerned about his greed and sides with wrong people, but he loves Shakuntala and her children. Goutham's childhood best friend Anand is worried because Goutham is unmarried. He and Goutham share a bond like brothers. Anand is married to Aparna and has two children. Anand and Aparna always try to find a suitable bride for their friend. Bhoomika's father Sadashiva is a combination of best friend, mentor and big support for Bhoomika. Goutham's spoilt half-sister, Mahima, and Bhoomika's brother, Jeevan, fall in love and have to consider the Hindu culture taboo of younger siblings marrying before their elder siblings. Bhoomika has yet to select a prospective groom so the marriage of Jeevan and Mahima must wait. So Shakuntala proposed Bhoomika as a match for Goutham, but both of them refused. Goutham and Bhoomika consider each other arrogant and quarrelsome. However, they agree to get married so that the marriage of Jeevan and Mahima can take place. Shakuntala is unhappy as Goutham and Bhoomika's relationship is improving day by day and now they are best friends. Goutham and Bhoomika's trust in each other increases when Bhoomika's ex Kiran tried to cause misunderstanding but Goutham exposed him without doubting Bhoomika at all. Goutham and Bhoomika falls in love but the core of their relationship is friendship, trust and bickering. Shakuntala, Lakshmikanth, and Jaidev try their best to break their relationship.

Now the story focuses on the life of Goutham and Bhoomika, while dealing with the evil plans of Shakunthala.

== Cast ==
=== Main ===
- Chaya Singh as Bhoomika Goutham Diwan, College Lecturer; Goutham's wife; Jeevan and Apeksha's sister; Sadashiva and Mandakini's daughter; Bhagya's daughter-in-law; Nakshatra and Akash's mother
- Rajesh Nataranga as Goutham Diwan, Chairman of Diwan Groups; Bhoomika's husband; Bhagya's son; Shakuntala's stepson; Sudha's brother; Lakshmi's uncle; Jaidev, Ashwini, Partha and Mahima's stepbrother; Anand's childhood best friend; Jeevan and Apeksha's brother-in-law; Sadashiva and Mandakini's son-in-law; Nakshatra and Akash's father
- Dushyanth Chakravarthi as Akash Goutham Diwan, Goutham and Bhoomika's son; Nakshatra's twin brother; Sadashiva, Mandakini and Bhagya's grandson
- Nainika Mahesh Rao as Minchu (Nakshatra) Goutham Diwan, Goutham and Bhoomika's daughter; Akash's twin sister; Sadashiva, Mandakini and Bhagya's granddaughter

=== Supporting ===
- Vanitha Vasu as Shakuntala Diwan aka Pankaja Diwan, Goutham's stepmother; Jaidev, Ashwini, Partha and Mahima's mother; Malli, Diya, Arun, Apeksha, Jeevan's mother-in-law, Lakshmikanth's sister
- Anand as Anand, CEO of Diwan Groups; Goutham's childhood best friend and well-wisher; Aparna's husband
- Swathi as Aparna Anand, Anand's wife; Goutham and Bhoomika's friend
- Chitkala Biradar as Bhagya Diwan, Goutham and Sudha's mother; Bhoomika and Srujan's mother-in-law; Lakshmi, Nakshatra and Akash's grandmother
- Raanav as Jaidev Diwan, Shakuntala's son; Goutham and Sudha's stepbrother; Ashwini, Partha and Mahima's brother, Malli and Diya's husband
- Krishnamurthy Kavathar as Lucky Lakshmikant Shankuntala's brother; Gowtham, Jaydev, Partha, Mahima and Ashwini's uncle
- Radha/Anvitha Sagar as Malli Sunil, Jaidev's wife; Shakuntala's daughter-in-law; Rajendra Bhupathi's daughter
- Yashwanth as Sunil, Malli's second husband
- Hanumanthe Gowda as Rajendra Bhupathi, Malli's father; Jaidev's father-in-law; Goutham's former rival
- Chitra Shenoy as Mandakini Sadashiva, Sadashiva's wife; Bhoomika, Jeevan and Apeksha's mother; Goutham, Mahima and Partha's mother-in-law
- Sihi Kahi Chandru as Sadashiva, Mandakini's husband; Bhoomika, Jeevan and Apeksha's father; Goutham, Mahima and Partha's father-in-law
- Amrutha Nayak as Apeksha Partha Diwan, Partha's wife; Bhoomika and Jeevan's sister, Shakuntala's daughter-in-law
- Karan as Partha Diwan, Apeksha's husband; Shakuntala's son; Goutham's stepbrother; Jaidev, Ashwini and Mahima's brother
- Megha Shenoy as Sudha Srujan, Srujan's wife; Goutham's sister; Bhagya's daughter; Lakshmi's mother
- Praveen as Srujan, Sudha's husband; Bhagya's son-in-lawn; Goutham's brother-in-law, Lakshmi's stepfather
- Pranvi Akshay as Lakshmi, Sudha's daughter; Srujan's stepdaughter; Goutham's niece; Bhagya's granddaughter
- Sara Annaiah/Ishitha Varsha/Rohini Krishna as Mahima Jeevan, Jeevan's wife; Goutham's stepsister; Shakuntala's daughter; Jaidev, Ashwini and Partha's sister; Sadashiva and Mandakini's daughter-in-law
- Shashi Hegde/Yashwanth Kumar as Jeevan Sadashiva, Mahima's husband; Bhoomika and Apeksha's brother; Goutham's brother-in-law; Shakuntala's son-in-law
- Chandana as Ashwini Arun, Shakuntala's daughter; Goutham's stepsister; Jaidev, Partha and Mahima's sister
- Shwetha Gowda as Diya, Jaydev's second wife; Shakuntala daughter-in-law; Bhoomika and Apeksha's sister-in-law; Gowtham and Partha's sister-in-law
- Malathi Sri as Sarvamangala Gowtham's grandmother; Shakuntala and Bhagya's mother-in-law; Jaydev, Partha, Mahima and Ashwini's grandmother.

== Adaptations ==
Language	Title	Original release	Network(s)	Last aired	Notes
Hindi	Bade Achhe Lagte Hain बडे अच्छे लगते हैं	30 May 2011	SET	10 July 2014	Original
Malayalam	Anuraga Ganam Pole അനുരാഗ ഗാനം പോലെ	17 April 2023	Zee Keralam	15 March 2024	Remake
Kannada	Amruthadhare ಅಮೃತಧಾರೆ	29 May 2023	Zee Kannada	15 November 2026	Remake
Tamil	Nenjathai Killadhe நெஞ்சத்தை கில்லாதே	1 July 2024	Zee Tamil	17 January 2025	Remake
Marathi	Veen Doghantali Hi Tutena वीण दोघांतली ही तुटेना	11 August 2025	Zee Marathi	Ongoing	Remake
