= Paaru (2018 TV series) =

Kannada language drama TV series

- Genre: Drama
- Written by: Harshapriya
- Directed by: Guruprasad Muddenahalli
- Starring: See below
- Theme music composer: Sunad Gowtham
- Country of origin: India
- Original language: Kannada
- No. of episodes: 1393

Production
- Executive producers: Raghavendra Hunsur; Varsha; (Zee Kannada)
- Producers: Dileep Raj; Srividya Raj
- Production location: Bengaluru
- Editor: Joni Harsha
- Camera setup: Multi-camera
- Running time: 22 minutes
- Production company: Dhruti Creations

Original release
- Network: Zee Kannada
- Release: 3 December 2018 – 16 March 2024

Related
- Muddha Mandaram

Paaru is an Indian Kannada language drama series airing on Zee Kannada from 3 December 2018. The show is an official remake of Zee Telugu's TV series Muddha Mandaram. One of the longest running Kannada television soap opera, the series stars Sharath Padmanabhan, Vinaya Prasad and Mokshitha Pai in lead roles.

== Summary ==
The story revolves around Akhilandeshwari, an arrogant and rich woman. Things change when Paaru, a poor village girl, comes to live at her house.

== Cast ==
=== Main ===
- Mokshitha Pai as Parvathi Adithya
- Sharath Padmanabh as Adithya
- Vinaya Prasad as Akhilandeshwari

=== Recurring ===
- S. Narayan as Ranagallu Veerayya Deva
- Mansi Joshi as Anushka
- Siddu Moolimani as Preetham
- Pavitra Naik as Janani
- Sitara as Damini
- Nagendra Shah as Hanumanthu
- Kushi Shivu as Ananya
- Sushmita as Yamini
- Suma Shastri as Savitramma
- Sneha Eswar as Arundathi

=== Cameo Appearances ===
- Rakshith Gowda
- Ananya Kasarvalli

== Production ==
=== Filming ===
On April 2021, Chief Minister of Karnataka B.S.Yediyurappa announced a sudden curfew effective from 26 April. On 26 May, Dileep Raj decided to move Paaru and Hitler Kalyana's shooting to Ramoji Film City at Hyderabad.

=== Special episodes ===
During the COVID-19 second waves, Paaru and Gattimela aired special one-hour episodes called 'Prema Sangama'.

=== Impact ===
Along with Kamali, the show hosted a meeting session for public in Bengaluru.

=== Broadcast ===
The production and airing of the series was halted indefinitely in mid March 2020, due to COVID-19 outbreak in India. The show aired its remaining episode till late March.The filming and broadcast was expected to resume on June 2020 but could not. After three months, the series aired new episodes from 13 July 2025 and simultaneously on ZEE5 digitally. The show had a re-run on the same network from April 2020.

== Adaptations ==
Language	Title	Original release	Network(s)	Last aired	Notes
Telugu	Muddha Mandaram ముద్ద మందిరం	17 November 2014	Zee Telugu	27 December 2019	Original
Tamil	Sembaruthi செம்பருத்தி	16 October 2017	Zee Tamil	31 July 2022	Remake
Malayalam	Chembarathi ചെമ്പരത്തി	26 November 2018	Zee Keralam	25 March 2022	Remake
Kannada	Paaru ಪಾರು	3 December 2018	Zee Kannada	16 March 2024	Remake
Marathi	Paaru पारू	12 February 2024	Zee Marathi	10 February 2026	Remake
Hindi	Vasudha वसुधा	16 September 2024	Zee TV	Ongoing	Remake
