= Apaayavide Eccharike =

2025 Kannada-language film

- Theatrical release poster
- Directed by: Abhijith Thirthahalli
- Written by: Abhijith Thirthahalli
- Produced by: V.G. Manjunath; Poornima M Gowda
- Cinematography: Sunaad Gowtham
- Edited by: Harshith Prabhu
- Music by: Sunaad Gowtham
- Production company: Yashaswini Creations
- Release date: 28 February 2025
- Running time: 146 minutes
- Country: India
- Language: Kannada

Apaayavide Eccharike (transl. Beware of danger) is a 2025 Indian Kannada-language horror thriller film directed by Abhijith Thirthahalli. The film stars Vikash Uthaiah, Raghav Kodachadri, Mithun Thirthahalli, Ashwin Haasan, Lankesh Ravana, and Radha Bhagavati in pivotal roles. Produced by V.G. Manjunath and Poornima M Gowda under the banner of Yashaswini Creations.

== Plot ==
The film follows the lives of three underachieving students—Suri (Vikash Uthaiah), Petge (Raghav Kodachadri), and Gaabri (Mithun Thirthahalli)—who live a reckless and carefree life. As they seek quick ways to earn money, they unknowingly get entangled in a supernatural mystery linked to a forest. The film takes a darker turn in the second half, revealing eerie voodoo practices and the consequences of resource exploitation. With a blend of horror and comedy, the film explores the group's survival against unknown forces.

== Cast ==
- Vikash Uthaiah as Suri
- Raghav Kodachadri as Petge
- Mithun Thirthahalli as Gaabri
- Ashwin Haasan as Sripad
- Lankesh Ravana
- Radha Bhagavati as Devika
- Harini Srikanth as Kalavati
- Rudra
- Navya
- Anupama Arulike
- Kiranavarshini
- Keertivardhini

== Production ==
The film was written and directed by Abhijith Thirthahalli, with cinematography by Sunaad Gowtham and editing by Harshith Prabhu. The background score and music were composed by Sunaad Gowtham.

== Soundtrack ==
The music for Apaayavide Eccharike was composed by Sunaad Gowtham.

== Release ==
The film was released on 28 February 2025.

== Reception ==
A. Sharadhaa of The New Indian Express rated the film three out of five stars and stated, "The horror elements in the second half do pick up; however, the plot meanders through various turns without fully grasping the tension that could have been built". Shashiprasad SM of Times Now gave the film three out of five stars and wrote, "Apaayavide Eccharike, meaning 'Danger, Beware,' delivers both scares and entertainment, though mostly in parts. It can be watched without much danger—for a one-time experience."

Y. Maheswara Reddy of Bangalore Mirror gave it two-and-a-half out of five stars and described the film as "scary but too long," stating that while the film has its moments, the stretched runtime affects the overall impact. Suma Gaonkar of Hindustan Times Kannada gave it two-and-a-half out of five stars, mentioning that " Vikash Uthaiah and Radha Bhagavati deliver solid performances, but the film could have benefited from a tighter script."
