= Anbudan Kushi =

Indian drama television series

- Genre: Drama
- Written by: Rasool; K. Ramesh Aravind
- Directed by: Siva Sekar (from 309th episode)
- Creative director: K. Ramkumar Radha
- Starring: Prajin; Shreya Anchan; Lokesh Baskaran
- Country of origin: India
- Original language: Tamil
- No. of episodes: 341

Production
- Producer: Muthu Raj
- Cinematography: K. Ramesh
- Editor: S. Mathan kumar
- Running time: 20-22 minutes
- Production company: Muthu Digital Studio Entertainment Private Limited

Original release
- Network: Star Vijay
- Release: January 27, 2020 – August 13, 2021

Anbudan Kushi (transl. Anbu and Kushi) is a 2020 Indian Tamil language drama television series that aired on Star Vijay. It premiered on 27 January 2020 and ended on 13 August 2021 with 341 episodes. It initially starred Prajin, Mansi Joshi and Arvind Sivakumar. Later Joshi was replaced by Reshma and followed Shreya Anchan, and Sivakumar was replaced by Lokesh.

== Plot ==
Anbu, a young lad, is a servant who works at Kushi's house. After a long time, Kushi comes back from Rajasthan to Chennai. She hopes to start studying fashion designing and work. However, her father Aditya Lal arranges her marriage to Sudhish, unaware that he is a criminal. Also Sudhish's sister, Maya, is seeking revenge for Aditya Lal killing her lover Shankar in 1996. Kushi secretly starts to study fashion designing. When Anbu finds out, he warns her about her father's anger. Anbu is also a professional boxer, and he has a match against Kuttipuli. Maya and Sudhish bribe Kuttipuli to murder Anbu in the boxing ring. Then Naresh and Sudhish put sleeping pills in Anbu's drink and tell Kushi to give it to Anbu. Not knowing that Anbu's drink was spiked, she gives it to Anbu and Anbu loses his game. At the hospital Anbu finds out that his drink was spiked, and he goes to Kushi's house and argues with Kushi. Aditya Lal overhears their conversation and calls out on Anbu's betrayal.

For Kushi's marriage, Aditya Lal invites Anbu's family except Anbu. Kushi finds out Sudhish is a criminal and begs her father to cancel the wedding, but he refuses. Sudhish threatens Kushi not to say a word; otherwise, he will kill Aditya Lal. On the day of the wedding, Kushi runs away. She ends up at Anbu's home, when her family comes to take her back, she shows her thali and says she is married to Anbu. Kushi's father is outraged and hurts Anbu. Anbu is angry at Kushi for saying he married her. Anbu asks Kushi to leave soon so Kushi asks Anbu to give her a few months to solve her problems.

Anbu and Kushi are childhood friends. Since childhood they never see eye to eye and are constantly fighting. After Kushi comes to Anbu's home and acts as Anbu's wife she gradually falls in love with Anbu. However, Anbu reminds Kushi that she will be going abroad for her studies soon. Anbu keeps saying that he only sees Kushi as his boss's daughter and a good friend. The rest of the story is about how Anbu solves his sister Selvi's marriage problems and accepts Kushi as his wife.

== Cast ==
=== Main ===
- Prajin Padmanabhan as Anbu, a cab driver, a professional boxer, formerly Aditya Lal's right-hand man turned Kushi's husband (2020–2021)
- Reshma Venkatesh as Kushi (2020–Apr.2021): A fashion designer, turned Anbu's wife
  - Mansi Joshi as Kushi (Jan.2020–Mar.2020) as Kushi (Replaced by Reshma)
  - Shreya Anchan (2021–Aug.2021) as Kushi (Replacement of Reshma)
    - Although Kushi's character was replaced there was only one dubbing artist for Kushi throughout the serial this was Akshaya Praba.
- Arvind Sivakumar (2020) as Sudhish; Mayavathi's Younger Brother (Main Antagonist)
  - Lokesh Baskaran replaced Sivakumar (2020–2021)

=== Recurring ===
- Deepa Shankar (2020–2021) as Rajeshwari replaced Shari: Anbu's mother, tailor
  - Shandhana (2020) as Rajeswari (replaced by Deepa Shankar)
- Meera Krishna as Madhuri Aditya Lal: Kushi's mother
- Seenu (2021) as Aditya Lal: Kushi's father, businessman (replacement of Suresh Krishnamurthi)
  - Suresh Krishnamurthi (2020-2021) as Aditya Lal
- Kausalya Senthamarai as Aditya Lal's mother, Kushi's grandmother (2020–2021)
- Arumuga Vel as Danasekar: Anbu's father, security guard, formerly a driver
- Sabari Krish as Arivu, Anbu's younger brother
- VJ Tara as Meena, Anbu's younger sister
- Dhanasekar as Kumaresan: Rajeswari's brother; Anbu's uncle, an astrologer
- Gowthami Vembunathan as Revathi, Kumaresan's wife;
- Mani KL as Abu, one of Anbu's best friends
- Samyutha as Shalini, Abu's younger sister (2021)
- Adhi as Tommy, Anbu's friend, mechanic
- Sathya Rajaaa as Thomas, one of Anbu's best friends, a boxer
- Balasubramaniyan Rajendran as Michael, Anbu's friend
- Priya as Senthamarai, Dhanasekar's sister (Episode 295)
- Sailu Imran as Parvathy, Anbu's cousin (Episode 295)
- Aarthi Ramkumar as Mayavathi; Villain, Sudhish's sister
- Banu Mathy as Soniya; Fake Maya
- Mahesh Prabha as Inspector Vignesh
- Rajesh as Thayalan's father
- Babitha Jose as Mangalam, Thayalan's mother
- Ajai Bharat as Thayalan, Selvi's husband, a teacher
- Sunitha as Selvi Thayalan, Anbu's sister
- Vidhya as Priya, Thayalan's sister
- Madhu as Gokul
- Preetha Reddy as Pooja: Kushi's cousin
- Rajesh Korn as Naresh: Kushi's brother
- Arvind Kathare as Kishore, Kushi's relative
