= Gunde Ninda Gudi Gantalu =

2023 Indian Telugu-language family drama series

- Genre: Romance; Drama; Family
- Created by: Gutta Venkateshwara Rao
- Developed by: Guru Sampath Kumar
- Directed by: Jai R V Akhil Kurapaati; Bairi Naresh Goud
- Starring: See below
- No. of episodes: 640

Production
- Producer: Gutta Venkateshwara Rao
- Camera setup: Multi-camera
- Running time: 22 minutes

Original release
- Network: Star Maa
- Release: 2 October 2023 – present

Related
- Siragadikka Aasai

Gunde Ninda Gudi Gantalu (transl. Heartful Bells) is an Indian Telugu language romantic drama television series airing on Star Maa. It is an official remake of the Tamil TV series Siragadikka Aasai. It stars Vishnukanth and Amulya Gowda in lead roles.

== Plot ==
The series centers on the unexpected marriage of Meena, the eldest daughter from a lower-class family, and Balu, a taxi driver struggling with alcoholism.

Circumstances force Meena, with traditional familial values, into marriage with Balu, who is more unconventional. With an aversion to love, he and Meena are introduced into their contrasting worlds. Balu's struggles with alcoholism and family conflict contrast with Meena's familial harmony while working at her family's flower shop. Together, they face challenges like Gaja, a predatory loan shark with eyes on Meena, and financial challenges.

Satyam opts for Meena to marry Manoj instead of providing financial assistance, and complications arise as Balu's brother Manoj elopes with Shailaja. Conflict arises at the wedding with the revelation of Manoj's actions, leaving the family destitute and sparking violent confrontations.

== Cast ==
=== Main ===
- Vishnukanth as Balasubramanyam alias Balu: Meena's husband; Prabavathi and Satyam's son; Manoj, Ravi and Mounika's brother; Sushila's grandson (2023-present)
  - Pushkar as Young Balu
- Amulya Gowda as Meena: Balu's wife; Sambayya and Parvathi's daughter; Sumathi and Shiva's sister; Manoj's ex-fiancee (2023-present)

=== Recurring ===
- Anila Sreekumar as Prabavathi: Balu, Manoj, Ravi and Mounika's mother; Satyam's wife; Meena, Rohini, Sruthi and Sanju's mother-in-law (2023-present)
- Srikanth Hebligar as Satyam: Balu, Manoj, Ravi and Mounika's father; Prabavathi's husband; Meena, Rohini, Sruthi and Sanju's father-in-law; Sushila's son (2023-present)
- Yashwant Kanigiri as Manoj Kumar: Balu, Ravi and Mounika's elder brother; Prabavathi and Satyam's eldest son; Rohini's husband; Chintu's step-father; Meena's ex-fiance; Kalpana's former lover (2023-present)
  - Roshan as Young Manoj (2023)
- Bobby as Ravi: Balu and Manoj's younger brother; Mounika's elder brother; Prabavathi and Satyam's youngest son; Sruthi's husband (2023-present)
- Tulasi Krishna (2023-2024) / Jyothika Poornima (2024-present) as Rohini alias Kalyani: Manoj's wife; Suguna's daughter; Chintu's mother
- Viharika Chowdary as Sruthi: Ravi's Wife; Surendra and Shobana's daughter; Sanju's ex-fiancee (2023-present)
- Dubbing Janaki as Sushila aka Sheela darling: Balu, Manoj, Ravi and Mounika's paternal grandmother; Satyam's mother (2023-present)
- Ragini as Kamakshi: Prabavathi's best friend; Ranga's wife (2023-present)
- Jyothi Gowda as Mounika: Balu, Manoj and Ravi's younger sister; Sanju's wife; Prabavathi and Satyam's daughter (2023-present)
- Sujatha Reddy as Shobana: Sruthi's mother; Surendra's wife (2023-present)
- JL Srinivas as Surendra: Sruthi's father; Shobana's husband; Satyam's former boss (2023-present)
- Usha Sri as Parvathi: Meena, Sumathi and Shiva's mother; Balu's mother-in-law; Sambayya's wife (2023-present)
- Bharath as Shiva: Meena and Sumathi's brother; Balu's brother-in-law; Sambayya and Parvathi's son (2023-present)
- Prasanna as Sumathi: Meena and Shiva's sister; Balu's sister-in-law; Sambayya and Parvathi's younger daughter (2023-present)
- Bhanu Prakash as Sanju: Mounika's Husband; Sruthi's ex-fiance; Neelakantam and Suvarna's son (2024-present)
- Radha Krishna as Neelakantam: Sanju's father; Suvarna's husband; Kantham's brother (2024-present)
- Unknown as Suvarna: Sanju's mother Neelakantam's wife (2024-present)
- Bharadwaz Kundurthi as Gaja: a goon; Shiva's employer (2023-present)
- KK Naidu as Vardhan(Dinesh): Rohini's blackmailer (2023-present)
- Bus stop Koteswar Rao as Ranga: Satyam's colleague and best friend; Kamakshi's husband (2023-present)
- Bhagyashree as Kalpana: Manoj's former lover; a con artist (2023)
- Sreerama Chandra as Kalpana's boyfriend (2023)
- Yashodha Krishna as Rajesh: Balu's friend (2023-present)
- Chatrapathi Sekhar as Sambayya: Meena, Sumathi and Shiva's father; Sumitra's husband
- Umadevi Appala as Chandrakantham aka Kantham: Sanju's aunt; Neelakantam's sister (Special Appearance)

== Adaptations ==
| Language | Title | Original release | Network(s) | Last aired | Notes |
|---|---|---|---|---|---|
| Tamil | Siragadikka Aasai சிறகடிக்க ஆசை | 23 January 2023 | Star Vijay | Ongoing | Original |
| Telugu | Gunde Ninda Gudi Gantalu గుండెనిండా గుడిగంటలు | 2 October 2023 | Star Maa | Ongoing | Remake |
| Kannada | Aase ಆಸೆ | 11 December 2023 | Star Suvarna | Ongoing | Remake |
| Malayalam | Chempaneer Poovu ചെമ്പനീർ പൂവ് | 29 January 2024 | Asianet | Ongoing | Remake |
| Hindi | Udne Ki Aasha उडने की आशा | 12 March 2024 | StarPlus | Ongoing | Remake |
| Marathi | Sadhi Manasa साधी माणसं | 18 March 2024 | Star Pravah | 29 March 2026 | Remake |
| Bengali | Uraan উড়ান | 27 May 2024 | Star Jalsha | 15 March 2025 | Remake |
