= Blessy Kurien =

Indian actress

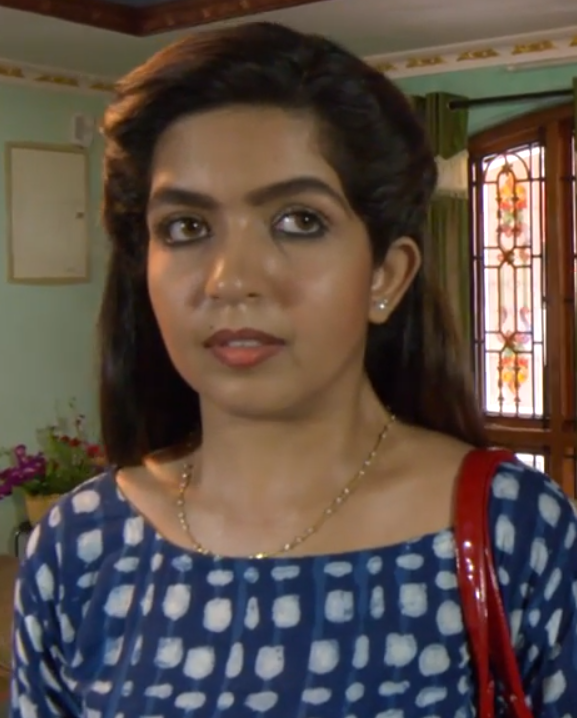
- Born: 19 July 1993 (age 32); Kottayam, Kerala, India
- Occupation: Actress

Blessy Kurien (born 19 July 1993) is an actress from Kerala who is well known for her roles in Malayalam-language television serials.

== Filmography ==
Year	Title	Role	Notes
2013	Oru Thundu Padam	Clara	Short film
2014	Image	Aswathy	Short film
2015	Rainbow 4	Gauri and Rithu	Short film
2015	Rasputin	Bus Passenger	
2015	Aadu	Veterinary Doctor	
2016	Popcorn	Jayabharati	
2019	Oru Yamandan Premakadha	College Student	
2019	Uyare	Air Hostess	
2024	Abraham Ozler	Channel Reporter	
2024	Varshangalkku Shesham	Costume Designer	
2024	Bazooka		

== Television series ==
year	Serial	Role	Channel
2017-2018	Bharya	Rakhi	Asianet
2017	Nokkethadhoorath	Meera	Mazhavil Manorama
2018-2020	Bhagyajathakam	Reshma	Mazhavil Manorama
2019–2022	Chembarathi	Nandana Aravind	Zee Keralam
2021–2022	Thoovalsparsham	Annmary	Asianet
2022–2023	Ennum Sammadham	Rajani	Mazhavil Manorama
2023	Mizhirandilum	Kavitha	Zee Keralam
2023	Manimuthu	Athira	Mazhavil Manorama
2025	Manathe Kottaram	Vaiga	Zee Keralam
2026 - Present	Mazhathorum Munpe	Shailaja	Asianet

== TV Shows as host ==
- Onuruchimelam Season 1 (Asianet)
- X Factor (Kairali TV)
- Good Life ( Rosebowl)
- Taste Time (Asianet)
- Taste of Kerala (Amrita TV)
- Food to See You (Kappa TV)
- Salt and Pepper (Kaumudy TV) - Celebrity presenter

== TV Shows as Participant ==
- Start Music Season 3 (Asianet)
- Vismayaravu (Zee Keralam)
- Rock & Roll (ZEE Keralam)
- Sooper Bumper (Zee Keralam)
- Sa Re Ga Ma Pa (Zee Keralam)
- Oru Chiri Iru Chiri ( MAzhavil Manorama)
