= Sembaruthi =

2017 Indian television series

- Genre: Soap opera
- Written by: Dialogues; P. Narayanan; R. Dharmalingam
- Screenplay by: G.Sabarinathan
- Directed by: Ram Kumaradhas; Sulaiman. K. Babu; P. Neeravi Pandian; M. Shankar; A. Manjunathan
- Creative director: Imran Khan
- Starring: Shabana Shajahan; Karthik Raj; Priya Raman
- Theme music composer: K. Kiran Kumar
- Country of origin: India
- Original language: Tamil
- No. of episodes: 1433

Production
- Executive producer: Imran Khan
- Producers: M.Jamal, Bala Sundaram and Dinesh Ramana
- Cinematography: K.C Ramesh; Maartin Jo; Balaji
- Editors: Sajin C, Pandidurai.G
- Camera setup: Multi-camera
- Running time: 22 minutes
- Production companies: Mindset MEDIA; Insidues Media

Original release
- Network: Zee Tamil
- Release: 16 October 2017 – 31 July 2022

Related
- Muddha Mandaram

Sembaruthi (transl. Hibiscus) is an Indian Tamil language drama that aired on Zee Tamil. It premiered on 16 October 2017 and ended on 31 July 2022. The show stars debutante Shabana Shajahan and Tamil TV actor Karthik Raj along with actress Priya Raman, her comeback on television after years ago. It is an official remake of Zee Telugu series Muddha Mandaram.

The story is about Parvathi, who comes from a village and joins as a maid for the wealthy 'Aadhikadavur' Akhilandeshwari's (Akhila). Then Parvathi falls in love with Akhila's son Adhitya and they secretly marry. Finally, the marriage is known by Akhila and she hates Parvathi. Then Adhi and Parvathi leave the house and start a new life in a rented house. Finally, Adhi and Parvathi are accepted and invited by Akhilandeshwari.

== Plot ==
"Aadhikadavur" Akhilandeshwari is a rich woman. After the death of her grandmother, Parvathi decides to work as a maid at Akhilandeshwari's house. Meanwhile, Akhilandeshwari is a strong-willed, stubborn lady who wants perfection in everything. The major U-turn comes when Adhitya, Akhilandeshwari's son, marries Parvathi without his mother's knowledge. Parvathi's father Sundaram was Akhilandeshwari's family's driver for 21 years. He is very loyal to Akhilandeshwari but is unaware of Parvathi's love with Adhitya. On the other side, they secretly get married, and this marriage is only known to Adhitya's father Purshothaman, Aadhitya's brother Arun, and Arun's wife Aishwariya. Akhilandeshwari's father supports this marital relationship. The three of them hide the truth from Akhilandeshwari. Adhitya and Parvathi face turmoils in their marital love life due to the evil woman Vanaja, who is the sister of Akhilandeshwari.

Vanaja is an evil and cunning woman, and she often plans to split up the family and shame Akhilandeshwari. But again and again, Parvathi turns saviour to Akhilandeshwari and her family's dignity. But in the couple's passionate love story, Adhitya's ex-fiancée and enemy of their family 'Nandhini' stands out as the biggest problem. Earlier, Adhitya became engaged to Nandhini, but Akhilandeshwari breaks the wedding by finding Nandhini's evil truth as she belongs to Nagapuri Vamsam.. So Nandhini seeks revenge on Akhilandeshwari by collaborating with Vanaja to ruin Akhilandeshwari.

Akilandeswari eventually gets to know about Adhi and Parvathi's marriage and starts to hate Parvathi. But due to the good behavior of Parvathi, Akilandeswari eventually accepts her as her daughter-in-law.

Later it is revealed that Parvathi is the only daughter of "Aadhikadavur" Aadhi Parameswaran, Akilandeswari's elder brother, who was disowned by "Aadhikadavur" clan for marrying a middle-class woman against the clan's dignity. Akilandeswari then declares Parvathi as the official heir of the Aadhikadavur clan.

== Cast ==
=== Main ===
- Shabana Shajahan as Parvathi Parameswaran Adhitya – Parameswaran's daughter; Sundaram's adoptive daughter; Ganesh's adoptive sister; Adhitya's wife. A young and beautiful girl, who is employed by Akhilandeshwari as her home cook. She is dutiful, beautiful and naive but she also strong-willed at times. She saved Akhilandeshwari's family many times in many ways. She loves Adhitya whom she later marries. She has now inherited leadership from Akhila unofficially. She was raised as a typical village girl by Sundaram, but in reality, she is biological daughter of "Aadhikadavur" Aadhi Parameswaran and belongs to "Aadhikadavur" clan. (2017–2022)
- Priya Raman as "Aadhikadavur" Akhilandeshwari "Akhila" Purshothaman – Parameswaran's sister; Purshothaman's wife; Adhitya and Arun's mother. A rich, strong-willed and stubborn woman, Akhilandeshwari expects perfection in everything. She is the de facto head of the house. Initially she cares Parvathi as a maid but she is unaware of her son's love and eventual marriage to Parvathi. Although stubborn, she is occasionally caring and is good at heart. She eventually learns of Adhi's marriage to Parvathi and hated both of them. Now she loves both of them, but refuses to accept Parvathi as her daughter-in-law, citing the reputation of family as the reason without knowing the reality of Parvathi. Finally she accepted Parvathi as her daughter-in-law. (2017–2022)
  - Priya Raman also played the character as Bhuvaneshwari (2022)
- Karthik Raj (2017–2020) as "Aadhikadavur" Adhitya "Adhi" Purshothaman – Akhilandeshwari and Purshothaman's elder son; Arun's brother; Parvathi's husband. He is a calm, intelligent and serious individual who is in love with Parvathi and eventually marries her, without his mother Akhilandeshwari' s knowledge. He and Parvathi lived alone in a house for rent, after his mother knows about their marriage and refuses to accept them. Later, they are accepted and invited home by Akhilandeshwari.

=== Recurring ===
- Oorvambu Lakshmi as Vanaja: Akilandeshwari's co-sister. She is evil, and cunning and always crafts plans to split the family and ruin Parvathi's reputation. She wants to overtake Akhila's position and loot the wealth. Also she seeks vengeance against Akhiladeshwari, Purshothaman, Adhi, Arun, Aishwarya and Parvathi. She and Nandhini scheme against them. (2017–2022)
- Sanjay Kumar Asrani as Purshothaman: Akhilandeshwari's husband; Adhitya and Arun's father. He is calm and patient, unlike his wife. He approves of Adhi's marriage to Parvathi. (2017–2022)
- Janani Ashok Kumar (2017–2020) / Dheepti Kapil (2021–2022) as Aishwarya Arun: Arun's wife. She is a weak-minded; initially hostile to Parvathi before her marriage to Arun, then starts caring for her and empathizing her. She was aware of Parvathi and Adhi's marriage and she supports them.
- VJ Kathir as "Aadhikadavur" Arun Purushothaman: Akilandeshwari and Purshothaman's younger son; Adhitya's brother; Aishwarya's husband. He is a lively man who is in support of his brother's love. At initial stage Arun was a playboy but, Arun is married to Aishwarya, whom he despised initially. Now they are closer in life. (2017–2022)
- VJ Mounika (2018–2022) as Nandhini: Adhi's ex-fiancée and Mithra's elder sister. Nandhini is a crafty woman who seeks to revenge on Akhilandeshwari's family for humiliating her. She belongs to the Nagapuri Vamsam (enemy of the Aadhikadavur family). She joins hands with Vanaja to take revenge against Akhiladeshwari, Purshothaman, Adhi, Arun, Aishwarya and Parvathi. She was stabbed to death by Akhilandeshwari in the climax.
- Narasimha Raju as Sundaram: Ganesh's father and Parvathi's adopted father, who is employed as the faithful driver of Akhilandeshwari's family who is working there for more than 25 years. He is loyal to Akhilandeshwari for her kindness and knows that Adhi and his daughter have married. (2017–2022)
- Jenifer (2017–2020) / Durga (2021–2022) as Uma: Vanaja's simpleton niece and Ragu's wife, who doesn't "think before she leaps." She is also a blabbermouth and foodie.

=== Others ===
- Sanjay as Ganesh Sundaram: Parvathi's younger brother, Sundaram's son. He helps her sister in her love. He wants to become a collector and he loves his sister and father very much. (2017–2021)
- VJ Lekha as Sindhu: Akhilandeshwari's personal assistant (PA) and Shyam's love interest. (2018–2019)
- Pradeep as Ragu: Adhi's former assistant, Parvathi's ex-fiancé and Uma's husband, who helps Adhi to find the logo eye's person. Then they found that it was Parvathi's eyes. (2017–2018)
- Devi Teju (2017–2018) / Preethi Shree (2018–2019) / Rani (2021) / Usha Elizabeth (2021) as Dhachayani: (Initially the character is named as Dhachayani, later on 2021, the character named as Ganga) Aishwarya's mother and Arun's mother-in-law.
- Balasivaji as Gajendran: A personal secretary of Akhilandeshwari, who manages the business. (2019–2021)
- Sumathi Sree (2017–2018) / Jayanthi (2018–2021) as Pattamma: A faithful servant and cook of Akhilandeshwari's family, who cares for Parvathi as a mother and helps Parvathi in dangerous situations.
- Singapore Deepan as Vadivelu (Vadivu): Relative of Vanaja. Comic and good-hearted, dislikes Vanaja and supports Adhi and Parvathi's love. (2020–2021)
- Bharatha Naidu as Mithra: Nandini's sister who is the other ex-fiancée of Adhi. Like her sister, she also seeks revenge on Akhilandeshwari's family, albeit secretly. She is the nemesis of Parvathi. (2019–2020 and dead, shot herself)
- Shyam (2018–2019) / Saif Ali Khan (2020–2021) as Shyam: Adhi's loyal and best friend. Adhi shares his feelings only with him and Arun.
- Manobala as Mr. Perumal: The rent house owner, who gave house to Adhi and Parvathi after they leave from the Akhilandeshwari house. (2020–2021)
- Shanthi Anand as Janaki Perumal: Perumal's wife, who take cares Parvathi and Adhi. (2020–2021)
- Azhagappan as Ramakrishna Parthasarathy: Adhi's school friend who has returned from the USA. (2020)
- Raaghav as JK: An entrepreneur and Adhi's enemy. (2020)
- Priyalaya as Chandini: A girl who was rescued by Adhi from JK. (2020)
- Karate Raja as Durai Manikkam: A police inspector, who scolds Akhilandeshwari and he labels her in a bad manner at a party. (2020)
- Seema as Sundaravalli: Akilandeshwari's mother-in-law, Purshothaman's mother, Arun and Adhitya's grandmother. She supports Parvathi and Adhitya's marriage and she planned to unite Akilandeshwari and Parvathi. (2021)
- Diwakar as Singara Velan: Sundaravalli faithful house servant. (2021)
- Jyothi Reddy as Rajeshwari (Raji): Akhilandeshwari's friend, who comes to search a bride for his son from Aadhikadavur lineage because to break her son and Bhavani's love. So Akhilandeshwari helps Raji for her sons's marriage. (2021)
- VJ Tara as Bhavani: Pattama's grand daughter, who loves Rajeshwari's son Mahesh but Rajeshwari not accepted their love. Adithya and Parvathi know about love between Mahesh and Bhavani. They try to help them succeed in their love against Rajeshwari and Akhilandeshwari. (2021)
- Vidhush Chowdhry as Mahesh: Rajeshwari's son and Bhavani's lover interest. (2021)
- Bhala Khoumhar as Rathnam: Rajeshwari's younger brother, who supports her sister. (2021)
- Birla Bose as Aalavandhan: He fixed his daughter to Rajeshwari son Mahesh as fiancée by Akhilandeshwari. (2021)
- G. M. Kumar as "Aadhikadavur" Aadhi Parameswaran: Akilandeswari's brother; Parvathi's father. he dead, after reuniting with Akhilandeshwari. (2021–2022)
- Livingston as Parameshwaran's friend. (2021)
- Shilpa Mary Teresa as Neelambari: Nandhini's aunt. She too belongs to the Nagapuri Vamsam (enemy of the Aadhikadavur family). She joins hands with Nandhini to take revenge against Akhiladeshwari and Parvathi. (2022 and dead, killed by Vanaja)
- Vishnu Unnikrishnan as Raghavan: Bhuvaneshwari's son. (2022)
- Yamuna Chinnadurai as Kavitha: Raghavan's wife; Bhuvaneshwari's daughter-in-law. (2022)
- Preetha Reddy as Kanmani: Bhuvaneshwari's daughter. (2022)
- VJ Prathu as Kathir: Kanmani's husband. (2022)
- Nisha Ganesh as Advocate Geetha Subramaniam: She came to solve Neelambari's murder case. (2022)
- Robo Shankar as Bhuvaneshwari's husband. (2022)

=== Special appearances ===
- Archana Chandhoke as herself: A television presenter, who appears in Akhilandeshwari and Purshothaman's wedding anniversary. (2017)
- Reshma Muralidaran as Shakthi Siva: Parvathi's friend who appears in Aditya and Parvathi's marriage celebration. (2018)
- Dinesh Gopalsamy as Siva: Sakthi's husband who also appears in Aditya and Parvathi's marriage celebration. (2018)
- Madhan Pandian as Presenter: Appeared as VJ in Akilandeshwari and Purshothaman's wedding anniversary celebration. (2021)
- Nalini as Doctor Girija: Akilandeshwari's friend and she gave treatment for Parvathi. (2021)
- Shreekumar as Karnan: A Inspector. (2021)
- Bhavya Shree as Adhi's ex-fiancée. (2021)
- Keerthana Poduval as Maari Amman: She came to Parvathi to rectify the Navagaraha Dhosham of Akilandeshwari. (2021)
- Nachathira as Amman: She came to Parvathi to rectify the Navagaraha Dhosham of Akilandeshwari. (2021)
- Nakshthra Srinivas as Ganga Amman: She came to Parvathi to rectify the Navagaraha Dhosham of Akilandeshwari. (2021)
- Iraa Agarwal as Kamakshi Amman: She came to Parvathi to rectify the Navagaraha Dhosham of Akilandeshwari. (2021)
- Ayesha Zeenath as Meenakshi Amman: She came to Parvathi to rectify the Navagaraha Dhosham of Akilandeshwari. (2021)
- Deepika Rangaraju as Karumariamman: She came to Parvathi to rectify the Navagaraha Dhosham of Akilandeshwari. (2021)
- Rachitha Mahalakshmi as Bhuvaneshvari Amman: She came to Parvathi to rectify the Navagaraha Dhosham of Akilandeshwari. (2021)
- VJ Parvathy as Durga Amman: She came to Parvathi to rectify the Navagaraha Dhosham of Akilandeshwari. (2021)
- Swathi Sharma as Bommi: A special appearance in climax episode
- Abhishek Shankar as Hari Krishnan: A special appearance in climax episode
- Akshaya Kimmi as Maddy: A special appearance in climax episode
- Vaishnavi Arulmozhi as Amman: A special appearance in climax episode

== Reception ==
=== Viewership ===
In BARC Era, This is the first ever Television Series in Zee Tamil to become No.1 at U+R as well as Urban Market in TRP ratings. The series gradually gained more popularity and viewership in April 2018 by its screenplay and mainly for the on-screen pair Adhi-Parvathy and their romance in every episode. Also the series made the channel to number one position and becoming the first Zee Tamil program to enter the top five. The series praised, as it was the first non-Sun TV Tamil series to top the TRP charts maintaining its 1st position in top 5 until the COVID-19 break in April 2020 and after also. However Sembaruthi creates a record by garnered 16.23 million impressions, which was the highest rating ever in overall Tamil television dramas and also compare to other serials, Sembaruthi is the Highest TRP serial in Tamil Nadu. In week 7 of 2020, it garnered 13.5 million impressions in Urban+Rural areas and 12.56 million impressions in Urban areas. The series maintained its No.1 position in Tamil Nadu for 24 weeks by defeating 9:00pm slots of Sun TV and Vijay TV television dramas and it repeatedly leading the slot in Urban and Urban+Rural markets in 2018 to 2020. Sembaruthi gave tough competition in TRP to its rival channel's top rated soap Nayagi, which was aired at 8:00pm slot. In the week ending 28 December 2018, it became the most watched Tamil television program by garnering 10.79 million impressions and in week 49 of 2019, it maintained top four position with 9.27 million impressions in overall watch television programs as per BARC viewership.

Sembaruthi success meet program named Sembaruthi Oru Sathanaipayanam delivered 6.88 million impressions.

=== Ratings ===
2018

Week and year	BARC ratings (Overall Tamil GEC)		Ref(s)
Week and year	Impressions (in millions)	Ranking	Ref(s)
Week 52, 2018	15.7	1	

2019

Week and year	BARC ratings (Overall Tamil GEC)		Ref(s)
Week and year	Impressions (in millions)	Ranking	Ref(s)
Week 24, 2019	10.0	2	
Week 25, 2019	11.1	2	
Week 26, 2019	11.3	2	
Week 27, 2019	10.3	2	
Week 28, 2019	11.2	1	
Week 29, 2019	10.5	2	
Week 30, 2019	10.8	2	
Week 33, 2019	9.34	2	
Week 35, 2019	12.4	1	

== Adaptations ==
Language	Title	Original release	Network(s)	Last aired	Notes
Telugu	Muddha Mandaram ముద్ద మందిరం	17 November 2014	Zee Telugu	27 December 2019	Original
Tamil	Sembaruthi செம்பருத்தி	16 October 2017	Zee Tamil	31 July 2022	Remake
Malayalam	Chembarathi ചെമ്പരത്തി	26 November 2018	Zee Keralam	25 March 2022	Remake
Kannada	Paaru ಪಾರು	3 December 2018	Zee Kannada	16 March 2024	Remake
Marathi	Paaru पारू	12 February 2024	Zee Marathi	10 February 2026	Remake
Hindi	Vasudha वसुधा	16 September 2024	Zee TV	Ongoing	Remake

== Production ==
=== Special events and crossover episodes ===
- On 11 February 2019, Sembaruthi held a wedding episode called Sembaruthi Kalyanam (Sembaruthi Wedding) for Adhi and Parvarthi's marriage, which aired non-stop three hours on Sunday.
- On 11 August 2019, Zee Tamil held a grand event Sembaruthi Oru Sathanaipayanam with all the cast and crew to celebrate the success of the series.
- This series had the crossover with Oru Oorla Oru Rajakumari called as Sadhanai Sangamam from 12 July 2021 to 31 July 2021.
- On 2 January 2022, this series held a two and half hour special episode titled as 'Sembaruthi MEGA Sunday Kondattam' regarding the Union of Parvathi and Akilandeshwari.

=== Music ===
Sembaruthi's melody wedding song Nenjodu Kalanthavale was composed by Sekar Sai Bharath

Sembaruthi

Soundtrack album by Kiran, Sekar Sai Bharath
- Released: 11 January 2019
- Recorded: 2019
- Genre: TV serial soundtrack
- Language: Tamil

Songs
No.	Title	Length
1.	"Nenjodu Kalanthavale" (Wedding song)	3:13
2.	"Unnale Meendum Pirandhen" (Wedding Day Episode song)	1:10
3.	"Ragasiyamai Oru Kadhal" (Title Track)	4:00
4.	"Kadhal Vazhume" (Wedding Episode Song)	3:10
5.	"Un Peyaril En Peyar Serum" (Wedding Episode song)	3:13
6.	"Oor Potridum Engal Kulamagal"	1:06
7.	"Mannavane Kalangaathey" (Aditya Left Home)	4:37
8.	"Eeshwari.. Akilandeswari" (Boost Song For Akilandeswari)	1:03
9.	"Enga Ooru Pannaiyapuram" (Climax Dance Song)	4:33
10.	"Parvathi Pattabishegam Gana Song" (Gang Song for about Sembaruthi Characters and Scenes)	4:57

== Notes ==
- Initially Sridevi Ashok played the character as Nandhini for few episodes, later VJ Mounika replaced her.
- In the Cast Section, slash "/" represents that the cast member of that particular character has been replaced by another person.
- In the Cast Section, the year represents the cast member and their character presences in the series.
