= Kamali (TV series) =

2018 Kannada Language TV Series

- Genre: Drama
- Developed by: K.Usharani
- Written by: Dialogue: Satyaki
- Screenplay by: Chethana Vasishta; Sanjeev Megoti; Mahesh Rao
- Directed by: K.S. Ramji; Aravind Kaushik
- Creative director: Hayavadana Vadiraj
- Starring: See below
- Country of origin: India
- Original language: Kannada
- No. of episodes: 1178

Production
- Executive producers: Raghavendra Hunsur; Harshapriya; Varsha; Shweta; (Zee Kannada)
- Producers: Aravind Kaushik; Shilpa.B.Aravid; K.S.Ramji; Rohith Kumar
- Production location: Karnataka
- Camera setup: Multi-camera
- Running time: 22 minutes
- Production companies: Sattvah Media; Gagana Enterprises

Original release
- Network: Zee Kannada
- Release: 28 May 2018 – 7 October 2022

Related
- Mutyala Muggu

Kamali is an Indian Kannada language television soap opera which premiered on 28 May 2018 and on Zee Kannada and ended its 4 year run on 7 October 2022. One of the longest running Kannada television soap opera, the show stars Amulya Gowda and Niranjan BS in lead roles. The show is an official remake of Telugu TV series Mutyala Muggu.

== Plot ==
Kamali is a passionate Kabaddi player, who hopes to succeed in both academics and sports. However, her family’s painful past holds her back from actively pursuing her dream. Kamali participates in an important Kabaddi match with the help of her grandfather and teacher, which opens up new opportunities for her. Life for Kamali and her family forever changes when she receives a once-in-a-lifetime opportunity to move to the city and complete her studies through a scholarship. She also meets Anika, her half-sister, in the city.Kamali is finally reunited with her father and grandmother. As Kamali's bond with Rishi grows, so does the hatred of Anika and Tara. Kamali's love stands strong against their evil schemes.

== Cast ==
=== Main ===
- Amulya Gowda as Kamali
- Niranjan BS as Rishi
- Rachana Smith as Anika

=== Recurring ===
- Padma Vasanthi as Annapoorna Mahajan
- Sanjay as Chandrakant
- Yamuna Srinidhi as Gauri/Saroja/Mangalamma
- Sapna Deekshith as Tara
- Mico Manju as Ramesh
- Ankietha as Ningi
- Shilpa Iyer as Hasini
- Dheekshith Shetty
- Yashaswini Ravindra as Rachana
- Mithun Tejasvi

== Production ==
=== Casting ===
Mithun Tejasvi was signed to portray the father of lead protagonist, making his return to TV after 2- year hiatus. Amulya Gowda was roped in to play Kamali, a village kabadi player. Rachana Smith was cast to play the negative lead, Anika, making her television debut. Dheekshith Shetty entered the show in a cameo role of Rishi's friend. Mithun Tejasvi who played Chandru quit the series and was replaced by Master Sanjay from March 2021. In March 2022, Sapna Deekshith, playing the mother of male lead, quit the series due to creative differences.

=== Release ===
Kamali premiered on Zee Kannada from 28 May 2018. Along with Paaru, the show hosted a meeting session for public in Bengaluru. In July 2021, the show aired special episodes called 'Kamali Kalyanotsava' featuring the wedding of the leads Kamali and Rishi.

=== Filming ===
On April 2021, Chief Minister of Karnataka B.S.Yediyurappa announced a sudden curfew effective from 26 April. On 26 May, K.S.Ramji decided to move all their shows shooting to Ramoji Film City at Hyderabad.

=== Broadcast ===
The production and airing of the series was halted indefinitely in mid March 2020, due to COVID-19 outbreak in India. The show aired its remaining episode till late March.The filming and broadcast was expected to resume on June 2020 but could not. After three months, the series aired new episodes from 13 July 2025 and simultaneously on Zee5 digitally.
