= Anna Thangi (TV series) =

Indian Kannada-language soap opera

- Genre: Soap opera
- Written by: D Nagendra Prasad
- Screenplay by: Dwarki Raghav
- Story by: Dialogues: Turuvekere Prasad
- Directed by: Kiran R
- Starring: Madhu Sagar; Akhila Dechamma
- Opening theme: "Ninu Obbale Nana Lokavu"; Vivan Arya, Shashank, Shruthi Prashant (Vocals)
- Original language: Kannada
- No. of seasons: 2
- No. of episodes: 1174

Production
- Producers: K. M. Chaitanya; Haridas K. G. F
- Editor: Gururaj B. K.
- Camera setup: Multi-camera
- Running time: 22–23 minutes
- Production company: Chaitanya Haridas Cinemas

Original release
- Network: Udaya TV
- Release: 22 November 2021 – 23 August 2025

Related
- Vanathai Pola

Anna Thangi was an Indian Kannada language soap opera airing on Udaya TV. The show premiered on 22 November 2021 and ended on 23 August 2025. It stars Madhu Sagar and Akhila Dechamma in lead roles. The series is an official remake of Tamil language serial Vanathai Pola.

== Plot ==
Shivaraju and Tulasi are siblings who lose their parents at a young age. They will go to any lengths for each other. Though Tulasi is in love with Abhishek, she agrees to her brother's wish in marriage. The stirring tale of this doting brother and sister forms the crux of the story.

== Cast ==
=== Main ===
- Madhu Sagar as Shivaraju
- Akhila Dechamma as Tulasi
- Prajawal as Indra
- Anivitha as Jyothi
- Binny Joseph as Ganga

=== Supporting ===
- Mansi Joshi / Jessica/ as Sandhya
- Rajesh Dhruva / Yadu Shreshtha / Anirish as Abhishek
- Swaraj Shetty / Prajwal Ravi as Indra
- Radha Ramachandra / Leela Basavaraju as Ajji
- Rohith Nagesh / Ramesh Salagunidi as Najjappa
- Sharmita
- Girish Jatti
- Tanuja / Padhma Shivamogga as Chandirka
- Rajini as savithri

== Production ==
=== Casting ===
Madhu Sagar was selected to portray the lead role as Shivaraju. Akhila Dechamma made her television acting debut with the series by playing another lead role as Thulasi. Mansi Joshi was selected in a supporting role but later was replaced by Jessica. Meanwhile Rajesh Dhruva was cast in supporting role who made his comeback with the series but was later replaced actor Yadu Shreshtha.
