= Aakash Aath =

Indian Bengali-language television channel

- Logo used since 2013
- Country: India
- Broadcast area: India
- Headquarters: Kolkata, West Bengal, India

Programming
- Language: Bengali
- Picture format: SDTV 576i

History
- Launched: 2000
- Former names: Akash Bangla (2000-2013)

Links
- Website: aakashaath.com platform8.tv

Availability

Streaming media
- Platform8: India

Aakash Aath is an Indian Bengali-language television channel based in Kolkata, established in 2000 by G Entertainment as Aakash Bangla. In October 2013, a new logo was unveiled and the channel was rebranded to Akash Aath. The founder of this TV channel is Ashok Surana and the directors are Rahuul Surana, Priyanka Surana and Rishab Surana. Aakash Aath is a mixed entertainment channel airing a variety of programming, such as drama series and movies.

== Currently broadcast ==
Name	Time	Day
Good Morning Aakash Live	7.00 am	Mon – Sun
Radhuni	1.30 pm	Mon – Sun
Aakashe Superstar	2.00 pm	Mon – Sun
Aakash Barta Live	3.00 pm	Mon – Sun
Matinee Movie	3.05 pm	Mon – Sun
Radhuni (Repeat)	5.30 pm	Mon – Sat
Aakash Barta Live	6.00 pm	Mon – Sun
Seth Patharer Thala	6.30 pm	Mon – Sat
Adi Sakti Adyapith	7.00 pm	Mon – Sat
Khonar Kahini	7.30 pm	Mon – Sat
Police Filez	8.00 pm	Mon – Sun
Aakashe Superstar	9.30 pm (Repeat)	Mon – Sun
Aakash Barta Live	10.30 pm	Mon – Sun
Police Filez	11.00 pm (Repeat)	Mon – Sun

== Formerly broadcast ==
- Aakashe Superstar
- Aakasher Telefilm
- Aakash Kusum
- Ak Maser Sahitya
- Anandamoyee Maa
- Anya Ami
- Bideshe Bangali
- Bridhashram 1,2
- Chalo Jai
- Charge Sheet
- Choye Maser Mega
- Crime Bengal
- Dosh Minute er Khel
- Dipabalir Saat Kahon
- Eka Noy Ekkaborti
- Gaan Aamar Pran
- Gaan Fight
- Gaan points
- Gandaria 1,2,3
- Garamagaram
- Gopal Bhar
- Ghente Gha
- Hridmajhaye 1,2,3
- Jai Maa Santoshi
- Janani
- Jheel Danger Kanya
- Kanchi (TV series)
- Khonj Khabar
- Kon Se Aalor Swapno Niye
- Lakkhi Chana
- Madhur Hawa
- Mahalaya
- Matinee Talkies
- Meyeder Brata Katha
- Meye No. 1
- Misthu
- Nati Binodini
- Om Sai Ram
- Padyaradi Para Bawali Gaan
- Police Filez (Season 1)
- Sadharan Asadharan
- Sahityer Shera Samay
- Sakaler Aakash
- Section 302
- Sidhel Chor
- Som Theke Shukra
- Som Theke Shoni
- Shreyoshi (TV series)
- Tatka Golpe Aatka Maas
- Teen Bhubaner Paare
- The Legend 1, 2, 3
- Tomaay Hrid Majhare Rakhbo
- Umar Sansar
- Yuganayak Swami Vivekananda
