= Zee Kannada =

Indian television channel

- Logo used since 2025
- Country: India
- Broadcast area: Nationwide
- Network: Zee Entertainment Enterprises
- Headquarters: Bengaluru, Karnataka, India

Programming
- Language: Kannada
- Picture format: 1080p HDTV

Ownership
- Owner: Zee Entertainment Enterprises
- Key people: Raghavendra Hunsur (CCO)
- Sister channels: List of Zee channels

History
- Launched: May 11, 2006; 20 years ago

Links
- Website: Zee Kannada on ZEE5

Availability

Streaming media
- ZEE5: (India)

Zee Kannada, stylised as Z Kannada, is an Indian Kannada-language pay television general entertainment channel owned by Zee Entertainment Enterprises, launched on 11 May 2006 as the third mainstream Kannada satellite channel. Headquartered in Bengaluru, Karnataka, it is among the most popular Kannada-language channels.

== History ==
Before Zee Kannada was launched, Zee Telefilms once operated "Asianet Kaveri", a Kannada-language regional channel launched in June 2000 in a joint venture with Asianet. The channel was later shut down in July 2002 after failing to gain momentum in its intended region, although Zee originally planned to relaunch it under the "Alpha" banner. Later on 11 May 2006 at 05:00 (IST), as part of its Zee South initiative, Zee Telefilms launched Zee Kannada as its second entry in the South Indian market after Zee Telugu. It was originally intended to launch twenty days earlier but was delayed to pay homage to Dr. Rajkumar, following his death on 12 April.

In July 2009, Zee Kannada premiered three format shows, namely Yariguntu Yarigilla, Gunagaana, and Gramophone. The channel recoloured its light-blue logo as seen in the main Zee TV at the time in blue and red, as part of a major rebrand which also included the plan to introduce programming aimed at audiences aged between 15 and 34. Zee Kannada launched a new brand identity, named Bayasid'dha Bāgilu Tegiyōṇa, and a high-definition channel in November 2018 at a grand ceremony during the Zee Kannada Kutumba Awards 2018.

During the COVID-19 pandemic in 2020, Zee Kannada aired reruns of its prominent series, but relaunched in another new format on 1 June 2020 with fresh premieres of new episodes after the Karnataka state government permitted the channel to resume shootings of its series on 25 May. On 15 April 2024, Zee Kannada underwent a major rebrand, with a new marigold-inspired design interface meant to "capture the heart and soul of Karnataka". The channel changed its logo along with all of its sisters on 8 June 2025, with the logo itself being unveiled at the 23rd Zee Cine Awards.

== Sister channels ==
=== Zee Kannada News ===
On 25 January 2022, the Zee Media Corporation launched Zee Kannada News, a sister channel of Zee Kannada, as a digital-only channel. The channel was announced to be converted into a linear one in March 2023 in preparation for the 2024 Lok Sabha elections, launching the following month.

=== Zee Power ===
Zee Power is a Kannada-language hybrid entertainment television channel airing a mix of films and television series, aimed primarily towards younger audiences. It was launched on 1 March 2020 as Zee Picchar as the Kannada-language counterpart of Zee Cinema, with the Hit Dinada Feeling slogan and as part of Zee's expansion in South India. Zee Picchar was first seen on promotional videos aired on the main Zee Kannada channel on 9 February 2020. The channel was rebranded as Zee Power in August 2025.

== Programming ==
=== Current broadcasts ===
==== Drama series ====
| Premiere date | Name | Adaptation of | Ref. |
|---|---|---|---|
| 9 March 2026 | Krishna Rukku | Tamil TV series Veera | |
| 2 July 2025 | Karna | Hindi TV series Rajaa Betaa | |
| 16 January 2024 | Lakshmi Nivasa | | |
| 1 September 2025 | Shree Ragavendra Mahatme | | |
| 27 January 2025 | Na Ninna Bidalare | | |
| 8 December 2025 | Adi Lakshmi Purana | Bengali TV series Parineeta | |

=== Former programming ===
==== Drama series ====
| Original release | Series | Last aired | Adaptation of |
|---|---|---|---|
| 8 February 2016 | Naagini | 7 February 2020 | Hindi TV series Naagin |
| 13 March 2017 | Jodi Hakki | 5 July 2019 | Marathi TV series Tujhyat Jeev Rangala |
| 12 June 2017 | Subbalakshmi Samsara | 3 April 2020 | Marathi TV series Majhya Navaryachi Bayko |
| 28 May 2018 | Kamali | 7 October 2022 | Telugu TV series Mutyala Muggu |
| 3 December 2018 | Paaru | 16 March 2024 | Telugu TV series Muddha Mandaram |
| 11 March 2019 | Gattimela | 5 January 2024 | Telugu TV series Varudhini Parinayam |
| 15 July 2019 | Radha Kalyana | 3 April 2020 | Telugu TV series Maate Mantramu |
| 9 September 2019 | Jothe Jotheyali | 19 May 2023 | Marathi TV series Tula Pahate Re |
| 17 February 2020 | Naagini 2 | 3 March 2023 | |
| 7 December 2020 | Sathya | 10 August 2024 | Odia TV series Sindura Bindu |
| 9 August 2021 | Hitler Kalyana | 14 March 2024 | Hindi TV series Guddan Tumse Na Ho Payega |
| 20 March 2023 | Bhoomige Bandha Bhagavantha | 4 August 2024 | Hindi TV series Neeli Chatri Waale |
| 29 May 2023 | Amruthadhaare | 15 November 2026 | Hindi TV series Bade Achhe Lagte Hain |
| 18 March 2024 | Shravani Subhramanya | 4 September 2026 | Telugu TV series Ammayi Garu |
| 17 June 2024 | Brahmagantu | 7 August 2026 | Tamil TV Series Seetha Raman |

== Reality and Award shows ==
- Bharjari Bachelors
- Comedy Khiladigalu
- Dance Karnataka Dance
- Drama Juniors
- Genes
- Hemmeya Kannadiga
- Jodi No. 1
- Mahanati
- Sa Re Ga Ma Pa Kannada
- Sa Re Ga Ma Pa Championship
- Super Queen
- Weekend with Ramesh
- Zee Kutumba Awards
