= Zee Telugu =

Indian pay television channel

- Logo used since 2025
- Country: India
- Broadcast area: Worldwide
- Headquarters: Hyderabad, Telangana, India

Programming
- Language: Telugu
- Picture format: 1080p HDTV

Ownership
- Owner: Zee Entertainment Enterprises

History
- Launched: 12 September 2004; 22 years ago
- Replaced: Alpha TV Telugu

Zee Telugu also known as Z Telugu is an Indian Telugu language general entertainment pay television channel in India. It was launched on 12 September 2004 as Alpha TV Telugu. and was rebranded as Zee Telugu on 18 May 2005. The channel is owned by Zee Entertainment Enterprises. Zee Entertainment Enterprises also launched a Telugu movie channel named Zee Cinemalu in September 2016.

== Establishment ==
In 2004, Zee Network had channels in Bengali, Gujarati, Marathi, and Punjabi. Its proposed Telugu channel making its first entry in southern region was expected to launch by August 2004, but the launch did not take place until September. The channel launched with the name Alpha TV Telugu, but was later renamed to Zee Telugu. It initially featured a large number of American films dubbed into Telugu. In August 2007, the network also dubbed Hindi film Sholay from Hindi into Telugu as an experiment.

== History ==
In September 2005, the channel announced Sanjay Reddy as its new chief executive officer, succeeding Ajay Kumar, who had left several months previously. Reddy had previously worked at The Walt Disney Company and Pearl Media.

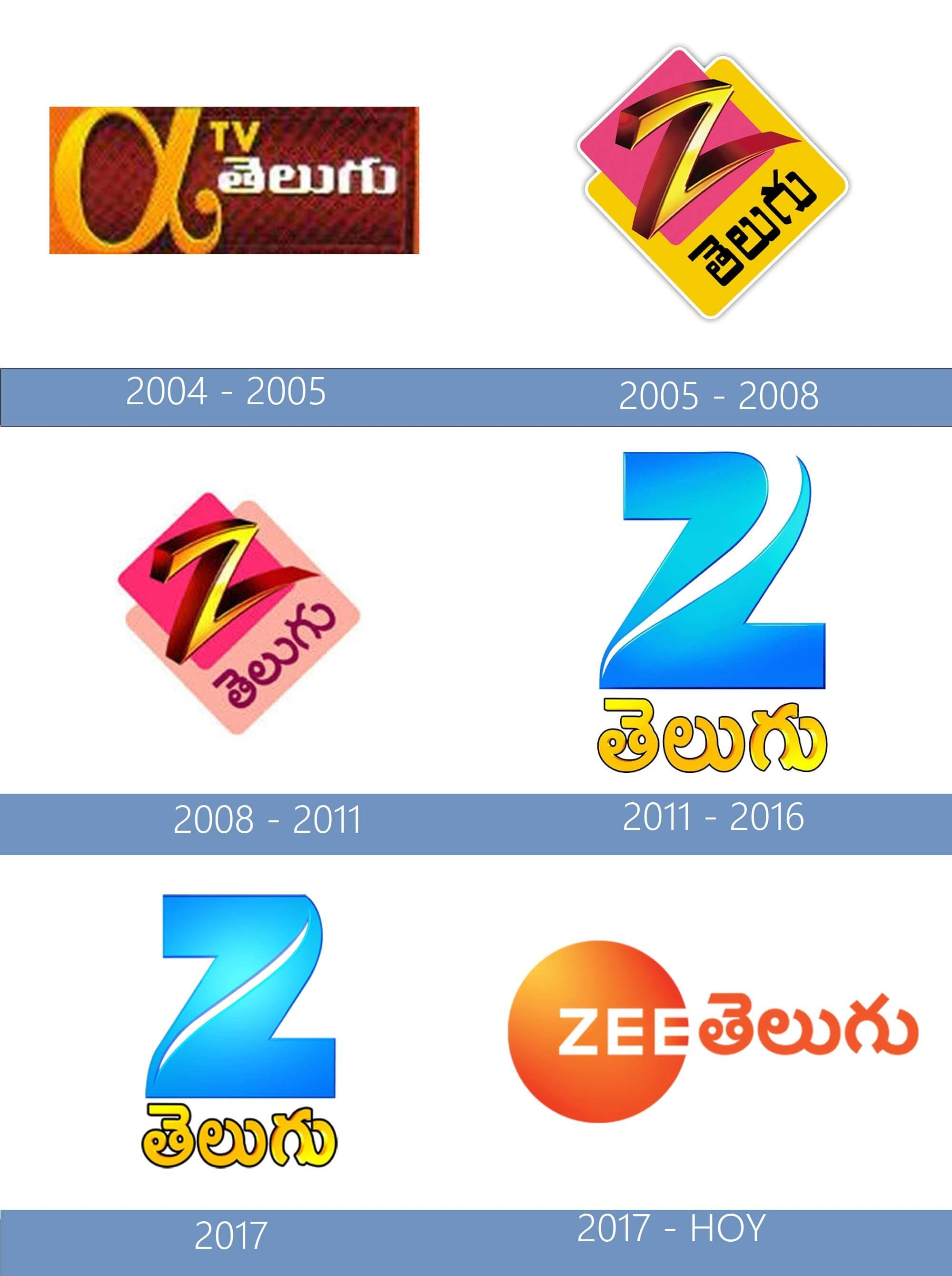
ZEE Telugu logo history

By December 2005, Zee Telugu had only achieved a 1.24% weekday and 1.86% weekend market share in Andhra Pradesh. As a result, it re-launched in order to shift the target market from a mass market to a segmented market of young professionals.

In late 2006, Zee Telugu began work on Sa Re Ga Ma Pa, a Telugu-language singing competition scheduled to run for 35 episodes. Zee Telugu announced plans to launch Little Champs, a version of the show aimed at viewers ages 6–13, hosted by N. C. Karunya.

== Reception ==
Week	Year	BARC Viewership		Ref.
Week	Year	Mega Cities	Rank	Ref.
Week 23	2021	280.29	5	
Week 25	2021	295.83	5	
Week 13	2023	267.21	5	
Week 16	2023	289.06	5	
Week 17	2023	284.44	4	
Week 22	2023	278.77	5	
Week 26	2023	283.38	5	
Week 30	2023	300.34	5	
Week 3	2024	289.02	5	
Week 26	2025	300.2	5	
Week 42	2025	276.45	5	
Week 44	2025	277.44	5	
Week 45	2025	288.74	5	
Week 47	2025	286.44	4	
Week 48	2025	282.48	5	
Week 49	2025	298.64	4	
Week 50	2025	275.88	5	
Week 51	2025	286.81	4	
Week 52	2025	283.75	5	
Week 4	2026	269.17	5	
Week 5	2026	258.52	5	
Week 10	2026	267.07	5	
Week 11	2026	274.23	5	
Week 12	2026	274.5	5	
Week 18	2026	259.29	4	
Week 19	2026	258.74	5	
Week 20	2026	270.52	4	
Week 22	2026	269.96	4	
Week 23	2026	258.46	4	
Week 24	2026	267.72	4	

== Sister channel ==
=== Zee Cinemalu ===
Zee Cinemalu is an Indian Telugu movies pay television channel offers Telugu language movies. It launched on 4 September 2016 and it is the sister channel of Zee Telugu. The channel is owned by Zee Entertainment Enterprises.
