= Lavangi Mirchi =

2023 Indian Marathi language TV series

- Genre: Drama
- Starring: See below
- Country of origin: India
- Original language: Marathi
- No. of episodes: 135

Production
- Production locations: Kolhapur, Maharashtra
- Camera setup: Multi-camera
- Running time: 22 minutes
- Production company: Ruchi Films

Original release
- Network: Zee Marathi
- Release: 13 February – 5 August 2023

Related
- Krushnaichya Leki

Lavangi Mirchi (transl. Chili Pepper) is an Indian Marathi language TV series which aired on Zee Marathi. It premiered from 13 February 2023 along with Yashoda – Goshta Shyamchya Aaichi in the afternoon slot under the segment Aapli Dupar, Zee Marathi Dupar. It starred Shivani Baokar and Tanmay Jakka in lead roles. It is produced under the banner of Ruchi Films. It is an official remake of Telugu TV series Radhamma Kuthuru.

== Plot ==
The journey of Asmi, a strong and independent girl, who looks the devil in the eye and rises to meet every challenge to protect her family and her loved ones.

=== Special episode (1 hour) ===
- 2 April 2023
- 14 May 2023

== Cast ==
=== Main ===
- Shivani Baokar as Asmita Gopinath Patil (Asmee)
- Tanmay Jakka as Nishant Mahipat Jadhav
- Shruja Prabhudesai as Radha Gopinath Patil (Akka)

=== Recurring ===
- Mithila Patil as Archana Gopinath Patil
- Prerna Khedekar as Manava Gopinath Patil (Munnu)
- Dnyanesh Wadekar as Gopinath Patil
- Atharva Tambe as Vicky Gopinath Patil
- Pari Telang as Yamini Gopinath Patil
- Samidha Guru as Nirmala Mahipat Jadhav
- Rahul Vaidya as Mahipat Jadhav
- Krushna Rajshekhar as Mugdha Mahipat Jadhav
- Rajesh Uke as Jagannath
- Shardul Apte as Soham
- Tejas Mahajan as Mohit
- Tushar Ghadigaonkar as Tambada
- Ankit Mhatre as Pandhara
- Vaishnavi Karmarkar as Purva
- Bhairavi Kulkarni as Shanta
- Deepti Lele as Tanaya
- Sushil Inamdar as Yashwant

== Adaptations ==
Language	Title	Original release	Network(s)	Last aired	Notes
Telugu	Radhamma Kuthuru రాధమ్మ కూతూరు	26 August 2019	Zee Telugu	3 August 2024	Original
Kannada	Puttakkana Makkalu ಪುಟ್ಟಕ್ಕನ ಮಕ್ಕಳು	13 December 2021	Zee Kannada	5 March 2026	Remake
Bengali	Uron Tubri উড়ন তুবড়ি	28 March 2022	Zee Bangla	16 December 2022	Remake
Malayalam	Kudumbashree Sharada കുടുംബശ്രീ ശാരദ	11 April 2022	Zee Keralam	16 October 2026	Remake
Punjabi	Dheeyan Meriyaan ਧੀਆਂ ਮੇਰੀਆਂ	6 June 2022	Zee Punjabi	30 March 2024	Remake
Tamil	Meenakshi Ponnunga மீனாட்சி பொண்ணுங்க	1 August 2022	Zee Tamil	4 August 2024	Remake
Hindi	Main Hoon Aparajita मैं हूं अपराजिता	27 September 2022	Zee TV	25 June 2023	Remake
Marathi	Lavangi Mirchi लवंगी मिरची	13 February 2023	Zee Marathi	5 August 2023	Remake
Hindi	Ganga Mai Ki Betiyan गंगा माई की बेटियाँ	22 September 2025	Zee TV	Ongoing	Remake
