= Puttakkana Makkalu =

2021 Indian Kannada language TV series

- Genre: Drama
- Written by: Satya Ki
- Directed by: Arooru Jagadish, Mahesh Sarang
- Starring: See below
- Theme music composer: Sunad gowtham
- Opening theme: Puttakkana Makkalu
- Country of origin: India
- Original language: Kannada
- No. of episodes: 1239

Production
- Executive producer: Smita Jagadish
- Producer: Aroor jagadish
- Camera setup: Multi-camera
- Running time: 22 minutes

Original release
- Network: Zee Kannada
- Release: 13 December 2021 – 5 March 2026

Related
- Radhamma Kuthuru

Puttakkana Makkalu is a 2021 Indian Kannada-language television soap opera which airs on Zee Kannada. This series is directed by Arooru Jagadish who is the director of the TV series Jothe Jotheyali. It premiered on 13 December 2021. The show is a remake of Telugu series Radhamma Kuthuru, which aired on Zee Telugu. The series stars Umashree, Manju Bhashini, Ramesh Pandit, Sanjana, Akshara and Shilpa, Dhanush NS.

== Plot ==
Abandoned by her father, Sneha vows to become an IAS officer and restore her mother Puttakka's pride. Amidst her struggles, she falls in love with Kanti, the son of Bangaramma and a local goon.

== Cast ==
- Umashree as Puttakka
- Akshara as Sahana
- Sanjana Burli/Vidya as Sneha
- Shilpa as Suma
- Dhanush NS as Kanti
- Manju Bhashini as Bangaramma
- Hamsa Pratap/Swathi as Rajeshwari
- Ramesh Pandit as Gopala
- Sarika as Nanjamma
- Karthik Mahesh/Nandeesh as Chandru
- Deepashree/Sowmya Mendan as Vasu
- Pavan as Muruli
- Gowthami as Pallavi
- Tukali Santosh as Naga
- Gajendra as Mungsi
- Anirish as Kaali
- Praveen as Huli
- Ramya Raju as Radha
- Madhusudhan as Chotu
- Sundarashri as Chowdavva

== Adaptations ==
Language	Title	Original release	Network(s)	Last aired	Notes
Telugu	Radhamma Kuthuru రాధమ్మ కూతూరు	26 August 2019	Zee Telugu	3 August 2024	Original
Kannada	Puttakkana Makkalu ಪುಟ್ಟಕ್ಕನ ಮಕ್ಕಳು	13 December 2021	Zee Kannada	5 March 2026	Remake
Bengali	Uron Tubri উড়ন তুবড়ি	28 March 2022	Zee Bangla	16 December 2022	Remake
Malayalam	Kudumbashree Sharada കുടുംബശ്രീ ശാരദ	11 April 2022	Zee Keralam	16 October 2026	Remake
Punjabi	Dheeyan Meriyaan ਧੀਆਂ ਮੇਰੀਆਂ	6 June 2022	Zee Punjabi	30 March 2024	Remake
Tamil	Meenakshi Ponnunga மீனாட்சி பொண்ணுங்க	1 August 2022	Zee Tamil	4 August 2024	Remake
Hindi	Main Hoon Aparajita मैं हूं अपराजिता	27 September 2022	Zee TV	25 June 2023	Remake
Marathi	Lavangi Mirchi लवंगी मिरची	13 February 2023	Zee Marathi	5 August 2023	Remake
Hindi	Ganga Mai Ki Betiyan गंगा माई की बेटियाँ	22 September 2025	Zee TV	Ongoing	Remake
