= Meenakshi Ponnunga =

2022 Indian Tamil-language TV series

- Genre: Drama
- Screenplay by: Haran Prasanna
- Directed by: L. Muthukumaraswamy (Episode 1-54); M.Shankar (Episode 55-198); Parameshwar (Episode 199-247); Ramkumar Das (Episode 248-637)
- Starring: Sriranjani; Soundarya Reddy; Aryan
- Opening theme: "Raasi Nalla Raasi"
- Composer: Vishal Chandrasekar (title track) Rakshith K (background score)
- Country of origin: India
- Original language: Tamil
- No. of episodes: 637

Production
- Executive producer: Kavidhai Senthil
- Producer: Bala Sundaram
- Cinematography: Arjunan Karthik
- Camera setup: Multi-camera
- Running time: 22 minutes
- Production company: Insidues Media

Original release
- Network: Zee Tamil
- Release: 1 August 2022 – 4 August 2024

Related
- Radhamma Kuthuru

Meenakshi Ponnunga (transl. Daughters of Meenakshi) is a 2022–2024 Indian Tamil language television drama starring Sriranjani with Soundarya Reddy and Aryan in the lead roles. It is an official remake of Zee Telugu TV series Radhamma Kuthuru. It premiered on Zee Tamil from 1 August 2022 and ended on 4 August 2024 with 637 Episodes.

== Plot ==
Meenakshi, abandoned by her husband, braves all stigma and hardships to bring up her three children. One of her daughters, Sakthi, vows to become an IAS officer and restore her mother's lost pride.

== Cast ==
=== Main ===
- Mokshitha Pai (2022) → Soundarya Reddy (2022–2024) as Shakthi – Meenakshi and Needhimani's second daughter; Yamuna's younger sister; Durga's elder sister; Vetri's love interest and wife; Ranganayagi's daughter-in-law
- Archana (2022–2023) → Sriranjani (2023–2024) as Meenakshi – Needhimani's first wife; Yamuna, Shakthi and Durga's mother; Karthik and Vetri's mother-in-law
- Aryan as Vetri – Ranganayaki's son; Saranya's brother; Pooja's ex-fiancé; Shakthi's husband

=== Recurring ===
- Gayathri Yuvraaj (2022–2023) → Kavya Bellu (2023-2024) as Yamuna – Meenakshi and Needhimani's first daughter; Shakthi and Durga's elder sister; Karthik's love interest and wife
- Pranika Dhakshu as Durga – Meenakshi and Needhimani's last daughter; Shakthi and Yamuna's younger sister
- Sasilaya as Ranganayagi – Vetri and Saranya's mother; Shakthi and Ashok's mother-in-law
- Anandmouli as Singaraja – Ranganayagi's husband
- Subathira as Pushpa − Needhimani's second wife; Shanmugam's mother
- Ram Sundar as Sangili – Pushpa's brother, who wants to marry one of Meenakshi's daughters, with the intention of making their life hell.
- Prabhakaran as Needhimani – Meenakshi and Pushpa's husband; Yamuna, Shakthi, Durga and Shanmugam's father; Karthik and Vetri's father-in-law
- Suganya as Saranya – Ranganayagi's daughter; Vetri's sister; Ashok's wife
- Hema Dayal as Pooja – Vetri's ex-fiancé
- Sudharsanam (2022) → Vishnukanth (2022–2023) → Ashwin Balaji (2023–2024) as Karthik – Kokila's son; Yamuna's husband
- Aarthi Ramkumar as Kokila – Karthik's mother
- Singaraja as Kokila's husband and Karthik's father
- Deepa Shankar as Shantha – Meenakshi's friend and maid
- Vigneshwaran as Ashok – Saranya's husband
- Thidiyan as Thidiyan – Vetri's friend
- Tom Frank as Giri -Vetri's friend
- Sanjay as Shanmugam – Needhimani and Pushpa's son
- Siddharth Kapilavayi as Rohit – Pooja's ex-fiancé

=== Cameo Appearances ===
- Ajay Rathnam as Karuppusamy

== Adaptations ==
Language	Title	Original release	Network(s)	Last aired	Notes
Telugu	Radhamma Kuthuru రాధమ్మ కూతూరు	26 August 2019	Zee Telugu	3 August 2024	Original
Kannada	Puttakkana Makkalu ಪುಟ್ಟಕ್ಕನ ಮಕ್ಕಳು	13 December 2021	Zee Kannada	5 March 2026	Remake
Bengali	Uron Tubri উড়ন তুবড়ি	28 March 2022	Zee Bangla	16 December 2022	Remake
Malayalam	Kudumbashree Sharada കുടുംബശ്രീ ശാരദ	11 April 2022	Zee Keralam	16 October 2026	Remake
Punjabi	Dheeyan Meriyaan ਧੀਆਂ ਮੇਰੀਆਂ	6 June 2022	Zee Punjabi	30 March 2024	Remake
Tamil	Meenakshi Ponnunga மீனாட்சி பொண்ணுங்க	1 August 2022	Zee Tamil	4 August 2024	Remake
Hindi	Main Hoon Aparajita मैं हूं अपराजिता	27 September 2022	Zee TV	25 June 2023	Remake
Marathi	Lavangi Mirchi लवंगी मिरची	13 February 2023	Zee Marathi	5 August 2023	Remake
Hindi	Ganga Mai Ki Betiyan गंगा माई की बेटियाँ	22 September 2025	Zee TV	Ongoing	Remake

== Production ==
=== Casting ===
Actress Archana was signed to portray the title role of Meenakshi in her first television debut. She quit the serial in April 2023 due to being unsatisfied with the storyline and in June 2023, she was replaced by Sriranjani. Mokshitha Pai was initially selected to play the role Shakthi, by marking her debut in Tamil television but later was replaced by Soundarya Reddy in November 2022 who also made her debut in Tamil television as Mokshitha Pai quit the serial. Aryan was selected to play the character Vetri, whilst Tamil motivational speaker Sasilaya was chosen to play the role of Renganayagi, Vetri's mother.

Actress Gayathri Yuvaraj was initially played the role as Yamuna. Later due to her pregnancy situations she need to stay in home, so she quit the series in September 2023, she was replaced by Kavya Bellu. In end of January 2024, actress Shreya Anchan was cast as special Appearance.
