= Ganga Mai Ki Betiyan =

2025 Indian Hindi-language TV series

- Genre: Drama; Romance
- Created by: Ravi Dubey; Sargun Mehta
- Developed by: K. Usharani
- Directed by: Ashish Srivastav; Ankur Bhatia
- Starring: Amandeep Sidhu; Shubhangi Latkar; Srishti Jain; Namrata Pradhan; Vaishnavi Prajapati; Sheezan Khan; Indira Krishnan
- Theme music composer: Ankit-Chetan
- Opening theme: "Ishqiyaa" by Chetan Bharanga; Lyrics: Sandeep Sharare
- Country of origin: India
- Original language: Hindi
- No. of episodes: 409

Production
- Producers: Ravi Dubey; Sargun Mehta
- Cinematography: Manarul Shaikh
- Editor: Shashank Singh
- Camera setup: Multi-camera
- Running time: 22 minutes
- Production company: Dreamiyata Entertainment

Original release
- Network: Zee TV
- Release: 22 September 2025 – present

Related
- Radhamma Kuthuru

Ganga Mai Ki Betiyan is an Indian Hindi-language television drama series that premiere from 22 September 2025 on Zee TV and streams digitally on ZEE5. Produced by Ravi Dubey and Sargun Mehta, the series is a remake of the Telugu TV series Radhamma Kuthuru of Zee Telugu and stars Amandeep Sidhu, Shubhangi Latkar, Srishti Jain, Namrata Pradhan and Sheezan Khan in lead roles.

== Plot ==
Set in the spiritual city of Varanasi, Ganga Mai Ki Betiyan follows the inspiring journey of Ganga Mai, a resilient woman who is abandoned by her husband for not bearing a son. Determined to defy social stigma, she raises her three daughters Sahana, Sneha, and Soni with pride, strength, and unwavering love. Ganga earns a living by running a small dhaba and becomes a symbol of courage in her community.

As the daughters grow, each faces her own struggles: Sneha is bold and justice-driven, Sahana shoulders family responsibilities, and young Soni begins to understand the challenges around her. Sneha’s life takes a turn when she crosses paths with Siddhu, a rough but good-hearted man caught between his feelings for her and his powerful mother Durgavati’s ambitions.

== Cast ==
=== Main ===
- Shubhangi Latkar as Ganga Sharma: Manohar's first wife; Sahana, Sneha and Soni's mother. (2025–present)
- Srishti Jain / Namrata Pradhan as Sahana Sharma: Ganga and Monohar's eldest daughter; Sneha and Soni's sister; Murli's ex wife. (2025–2026) / (2026–present)
- Amandeep Sidhu as Sneha Sharma Thakur: Ganga and Manohar's second daughter; Sahana and Soni's sister; Siddhanth's wife. (2025–present)
- Vaishnavi Prajapati as Soni Sharma: Ganga and Manohar's youngest daughter;Sahana and Sneha's sister. (2025–present)
- Sheezan Khan as Siddhanth "Siddhu" Singh Thakur: Durgavati and Virendra's son; Madhu's brother; Sneha's husband. (2025–present)
- Rohin Joshi as Murli: Professor at Soni's college; Kaushalya's son; Kusum's brother; Sahana's ex husband (2025–present)
- Indira Krishnan as Durgavati Thakur: Virendra's wife; Madhu and Siddhanth's mother (2025–present)

=== Recurring ===
- Madan Tyagi as Virendra Singh Thakur: Durgavati's husband, Madhu and Siddhanth's father (2025–present)
- Priya Bhardwaj as Madhu Thakur: Durgavati and Virendra's daughter; Siddhanth's sister; Shekhar's wife (2025–present)
- Mridul Raj Anand as Shekhar: Madhu's husband (2025–present)
- Vijay Kaushik as Manohar Sharma: Ganga and Indu's husband; Sahana, Sneha, Soni and Paras's father (2025—present)
- Shraddha Jaiswal as Indu Rani Sharma: Kali's sister; Manohar's second wife; Paras's mother (2025–present)
- Inder Jeet as Paras Sharma: Manohar and Indu's son (2025–present)
- Gunabi Mann as Kaushalya: Murli and Kusum's mother (2025–present)
- Raman Dhagga as Kaushalya's husband; Murli and Kusum's father (2025–present)
- Ekta Verma as Kusum: Kaushalya's daughter; Murli's sister; Manoj's wife (2026–present)
- Vipul Ahuja as Manoj: Kusum's husband (2026–present)
- Karan Sharma as Pujari: Siddhanth's friend (2025–present)
- Vijay Chanderma Billu as Halchal: Siddhanth's friend (2025—present)
- Rohit Pushpakar as Chanchal: Siddhanth's friend (2025–present)
- Vishal Singh as Kali: Indu's brother (2025–present)
- Aman Bhogal as Shanta: Ganga's friend (2025–present)
- Yasmeen as Purvi Pandey: Sarla's daughter (2025–present)
- Amandeep Kaur as Sarla Pandey: Purvi's mother (2025–present)
- Yogesh Garg as Battery: Siddhu's friend (2025)
- Arjun Verma as Tejpratap (2026–present)
- Meenakshi Verma as Bhavani Devi (2026–present)
- Dharminder Thakur as Amarnath (2025–present)
- Ram Aujla as Mr. Shukla: Shantanu's father (2026)
- Shehzad Shaikh as Shantanu Shukla: Mr. Shukla's son (2026)
- Mansi Sharma as Vinita: Murli's one-sided lover (2026)
- Sunil Kumar as Babloo (2026)
- Saee Barve as Phoolmati Devi (2026–present)
- Neelam Hundal Randhawa

== Production ==
=== Casting ===
Sheezan Khan was signed to play male lead, Siddhu. Amandeep Sidhu was roped to play female lead, Sneha. Shubhangi Latkar was confirmed to play Ganga Mai. Vaishnavi Prajapati was cast as the youngest daughter of Ganga Mai. Indira Krishnan had been cast as the main villain, Durgavati. Srishti Jain was cast as the eldest sister, Sahana. In March 2026, Shehzad Shaikh joined the cast as a hotelier, Shukla. In May 2026, Srishti Jain quit the show and replaced by Marathi actress Namrata Pradhan as Sahaana. In July 2026, Arjun Verma joined the show as Durga's nephew, Tejpratap Singh.

=== Music ===
The serial Ganga Mai Ki Betiyan features an original song titled "Ishqiyaa" as part of its official soundtrack. The track was released on 9 December 2025 as a single under the Zee Music Company label and is associated with emotional and romantic sequences in the serial.

The song’s composition and recording credits are attributed to Ankit-Chetan with lyrics by Sandeep Sharare and performance by Chetan Bharanga.

=== Release ===
The series was released on 22 September 2025 replacing Kumkum Bhagya at the 9 PM slot. By doing so, the show became the first non-Balaji Telefilms show in 19 years to air at that slot.

== Adaptations ==
Language	Title	Original release	Network(s)	Last aired	Notes
Telugu	Radhamma Kuthuru రాధమ్మ కూతూరు	26 August 2019	Zee Telugu	3 August 2024	Original
Kannada	Puttakkana Makkalu ಪುಟ್ಟಕ್ಕನ ಮಕ್ಕಳು	13 December 2021	Zee Kannada	5 March 2026	Remake
Bengali	Uron Tubri উড়ন তুবড়ি	28 March 2022	Zee Bangla	16 December 2022	Remake
Malayalam	Kudumbashree Sharada കുടുംബശ്രീ ശാരദ	11 April 2022	Zee Keralam	16 October 2026	Remake
Punjabi	Dheeyan Meriyaan ਧੀਆਂ ਮੇਰੀਆਂ	6 June 2022	Zee Punjabi	30 March 2024	Remake
Tamil	Meenakshi Ponnunga மீனாட்சி பொண்ணுங்க	1 August 2022	Zee Tamil	4 August 2024	Remake
Hindi	Main Hoon Aparajita मैं हूं अपराजिता	27 September 2022	Zee TV	25 June 2023	Remake
Marathi	Lavangi Mirchi लवंगी मिरची	13 February 2023	Zee Marathi	5 August 2023	Remake
Hindi	Ganga Mai Ki Betiyan गंगा माई की बेटियाँ	22 September 2025	Zee TV	Ongoing	Remake

== Reception ==
=== Ratings ===
The show topped the BARC chart in the first week of June 2026 by securing numero uno spot with 1.9 TRP and had a household reach of 3.0 TVR.

Week	Year	BARC Viewership		Ref.
Week	Year	TRP	Ranking	Ref.
Week 38	2025	1.4	9	
Week 4	2026	1.8	7	
Week 5	2026	1.8	6	
Week 6	2026	1.9	5	
Week 14	2026	1.8	3	
Week 17	2026	1.6	3	
Week 18	2026	1.7	3	
Week 19	2026	1.7	2	
Week 20	2026	1.7	2	
Week 21	2026	1.8	3	
Week 22	2026	1.9	1	
Week 23	2026	1.9	1	
Week 24	2026	1.9	1	
