= Uron Tubri =

2022 Indian television series

- Genre: Drama; Romance
- Based on: Radhamma Kuthuru
- Screenplay by: Ashrunu Maitra; Sudip Paul
- Story by: Srabonti Basu
- Directed by: Laxman Ghosh
- Starring: Sohini Banerjee; Swastik Ghosh
- Theme music composer: Suvam
- Country of origin: India
- Original language: Bengali
- No. of episodes: 204

Production
- Producers: Firdausul Hasan; Probal Haldar
- Camera setup: Multi-camera
- Running time: 22 minutes
- Production company: Friends Communication

Original release
- Network: Zee Bangla
- Release: 28 March – 16 December 2022

Uron Tubri is a 2022 Indian Bengali language drama television series which premiered from 28 March 2022 aired on Zee Bangla. The series is produced under the banner of Friends Communication. It stars Sohini Banerjee and Swastik Ghosh in lead roles.

== Cast ==
=== Main ===
- Sohini Banerjee as Tubri / Tuli Banerjee
- Swastik Ghosh as Arjun Bose

=== Recurring ===
- Laboni Sarkar as Sabitri Banerjee
- Sukanya Basu as Tora Banerjee
- Soume Chatterjee as Tinni Banerjee
- Abijit Guha as Rajen Banerjee
- Rii Sen as Rupali Banerjee / Rupa
- Ayush Das as Rony
- Rita Dutta Chakraborty as Anjali Bose
- Bikash Bhowmik as Subkankar Bose
- Kalyani Mondal as Arjun's grandmother
- Prriyam Chakraborty as Anjana
- Chandraneev Mukherjee as Anurup
- Preksha Saha as Juju
- Katha Chakraborty as Payel
- Bidisha Chowdhury as Sudha
- Sandip Chakraborty as Dipu
- Anamika Chakraborty as Nisha
- Sagnik Chatterjee as Samrat
- Mahua Halder as Mahua
- Manoj Ojha as Soroj
- Rajat Ganguly as Supriyo Bose
- Saugata Bandyopadhyay as Subhro
- Surajit Sen as Robi
- Soumodip Singha Roy as Vikram
- Suvajit Kar as Kushal Banerjee aka Karna
- Sharbani Chatterjee as Protima Banerjee
- Shyamashis Pahari as Sunirmal Mukherjee

== Adaptations ==
Language	Title	Original release	Network(s)	Last aired	Notes
Telugu	Radhamma Kuthuru రాధమ్మ కూతూరు	26 August 2019	Zee Telugu	3 August 2024	Original
Kannada	Puttakkana Makkalu ಪುಟ್ಟಕ್ಕನ ಮಕ್ಕಳು	13 December 2021	Zee Kannada	5 March 2026	Remake
Bengali	Uron Tubri উড়ন তুবড়ি	28 March 2022	Zee Bangla	16 December 2022	Remake
Malayalam	Kudumbashree Sharada കുടുംബശ്രീ ശാരദ	11 April 2022	Zee Keralam	16 October 2026	Remake
Punjabi	Dheeyan Meriyaan ਧੀਆਂ ਮੇਰੀਆਂ	6 June 2022	Zee Punjabi	30 March 2024	Remake
Tamil	Meenakshi Ponnunga மீனாட்சி பொண்ணுங்க	1 August 2022	Zee Tamil	4 August 2024	Remake
Hindi	Main Hoon Aparajita मैं हूं अपराजिता	27 September 2022	Zee TV	25 June 2023	Remake
Marathi	Lavangi Mirchi लवंगी मिरची	13 February 2023	Zee Marathi	5 August 2023	Remake
Hindi	Ganga Mai Ki Betiyan गंगा माई की बेटियाँ	22 September 2025	Zee TV	Ongoing	Remake
