= Dheeyan Meriyaan =

2022 Indian Punjabi language TV series

- Genre: Drama
- Screenplay by: Nomit Godbole
- Starring: See below
- Country of origin: India
- Original language: Punjabi
- No. of episodes: 539

Production
- Producers: Shashi Mittal; Sumeet Mittal
- Camera setup: Multi-camera
- Running time: 22 minutes
- Production company: Shashi Sumeet Productions

Original release
- Network: Zee Punjabi
- Release: 6 June 2022 – 30 March 2024

Related
- Radhamma Kuthuru

Dheeyan Meriyaan (transl. My Daughters) is an Indian Punjabi language TV series which premiered from 6 June 2022 aired on Zee Punjabi. It starred Kiranbir Kaur and Mandeep Singh Bamra in lead roles. It is an official remake of Telugu TV series Radhamma Kuthuru. It is produced by Shashi and Sumeet Mittal under the banner of Shashi Sumeet Productions.

The show was written by Kiran Bidkar and Nomit Godbole, and was an instant hit amongst its audience.

== Plot ==
Asha raises her three daughters single-handedly after her husband abandons her to marry another woman. Eventually, Asha’s daughter, Saanvi, resolves to redeem her mother's lost honour.

== Cast ==
- Neelam Hundal as Asha
- Amaira Jairath as Sargun
- Kiranbir Kaur as Saanvi
- Aarohi Kwatra as Suhani
- Mandeep Singh Bamra as Yuvraj
- Prachi Sharma as Harleen

== Adaptations ==
Language	Title	Original release	Network(s)	Last aired	Notes
Telugu	Radhamma Kuthuru రాధమ్మ కూతూరు	26 August 2019	Zee Telugu	3 August 2024	Original
Kannada	Puttakkana Makkalu ಪುಟ್ಟಕ್ಕನ ಮಕ್ಕಳು	13 December 2021	Zee Kannada	5 March 2026	Remake
Bengali	Uron Tubri উড়ন তুবড়ি	28 March 2022	Zee Bangla	16 December 2022	Remake
Malayalam	Kudumbashree Sharada കുടുംബശ്രീ ശാരദ	11 April 2022	Zee Keralam	16 October 2026	Remake
Punjabi	Dheeyan Meriyaan ਧੀਆਂ ਮੇਰੀਆਂ	6 June 2022	Zee Punjabi	30 March 2024	Remake
Tamil	Meenakshi Ponnunga மீனாட்சி பொண்ணுங்க	1 August 2022	Zee Tamil	4 August 2024	Remake
Hindi	Main Hoon Aparajita मैं हूं अपराजिता	27 September 2022	Zee TV	25 June 2023	Remake
Marathi	Lavangi Mirchi लवंगी मिरची	13 February 2023	Zee Marathi	5 August 2023	Remake
Hindi	Ganga Mai Ki Betiyan गंगा माई की बेटियाँ	22 September 2025	Zee TV	Ongoing	Remake
