= Manam Pole Mangalyam =

Malayalam-language television program

- Written by: Shekhar Dhavalikar
- Directed by: A.M.Nazeer
- Starring: Niyaz Musliyar; Meera Nair; Swasika; Rajendran N; Prem Jacob
- Opening theme: Kaatte Kaatte
- Composers: Ranjin Raj; Sithara Krishnakumar
- Country of origin: India
- Original language: Malayalam
- No. of seasons: 1
- No. of episodes: 260

Production
- Producers: Sudeep Karakkat and Arun Devassia
- Editor: Ajith Raj
- Camera setup: Multi-camera
- Running time: 22 minutes

Original release
- Network: Zee Keralam
- Release: 28 December 2020 – 2 January 2022

Manam Pole Mangalyam (transl. Marriage to partner of your own choice) is a Malayalam language television series airing on Zee Keralam and streams on Zee5. It stars Niyaz Musliyar, Meera Nair, Swasika, Rajendran N and Prem Jacob. It premiered on 28 December 2020. It is an official remake of Zee Marathi series Aggabai Sasubai aired from 2019 to 2021.

== Plot outline ==
Meera is a widow, she takes care of her family and faces all of life's issues calmly. She raised her son "Nikhil" and also takes care of her father-in-law but she always pays less attention to herself, loving everyone else except herself. After the marriage of Nikhil, the show focuses on how Meera's daughter in law "Nila" strives to bring a little joy in Meera's life. After the marriage of Nikhil and Nila, the family celebrates their marriage party in Arvind Raj's restaurant. The chef, Arvind Raj notices Meera and falls in love with her and the story begins.

== Cast ==
=== Main cast ===
- Niyaz Musaliyar as Aravind Raja
  - A popular chef and owner of Raja's kitchen
  - Meera's second husband
- Meera Nair as Meera
  - A widow, dedicated house wife and kind hearted women. She is Unnithan's daughter-in-law; Nikhil's mother and Nila's mother-in-law.
- Swasika as Nila Nikhil
  - A bold and straight forward girl. She is Nikhil's lover and turns wife; Meera's daughter-in-law; Unnithan's grand daughter-in-law.
- Rajendran N as Radhakrishnan Unnithan
- Sreekanth Sasidharan (Episode 1–100) / Prem Jacob (Episode 100 – present) as Nikhil Mukundan
  - Unnithan's grandson, Mukundan and Meera's son and Nila's husband

=== Recurring cast ===
- Boban Alummoodan as Mukundhan/Babuji
  - Unnithan's son and Nikhil's father
- Ann Maria as Sona
  - Babuji's caretaker
- Jolly Easow as Clara; Meera's neighbor
- Rahul Mohan as Ravishankar; Nila's father
- Kishore as Dr.Nambeesan
- Sayana Krishna as Vimala; Cunning and jealous lady in Meera's neighborhood
- Sunitha as Latha; Vimala's mother in law
- Hari as Udayan; Vimala's husband
- Adya Aurora as Medha
- Jayan as Mahadevan; Unnithan's younger brother
- Lakshmi Sanal as Sreedevi Thankachi; Mahadevan's wife
- Bindhu Aneesh as Hemalatha; Nila's mother
- Riya as Julie; Nikhil's boss and Aravind Raja's friend
- M. R. Gopakumar as Retd.Captain Rajaraja Varma/Varmaji
- Anil Narayanan as Gopi; Vimala's father in law
- Vandana Krishnan as Mili; Raja's personal assistant
- Della George as Thinkal Mariyam
- Sumi Santhosh

=== Cameo appearance ===
- Mridula Vijay as Samyuktha
  - Nila's friend (in Nila-Nikhil Wedding Episode)
- Sushmitha Prabhakaran as Sreelakshmi
  - Nila's friend (in Meera's Haldi Episode)
- Prayaga Martin as herself (guest in Meera-Aravind Raja Marriage Maha episode)
- Meghna Vincent as Jyothi (promo presence)
- Amala Gireesan as Kalyani (promo presence)
- Shanavas Shanu as Hitler (promo presence)

== Production ==
The production team involves Sudeep Karakkat Arun Devassia and Umesh Unnikrishnan (Umesh Nair).

=== Music ===
The title song been composed by Ranjin Raj and sung by Sithara Krishnakumar and B.K.Harinarayanan.

=== Casting ===
Swasika plays the role of Nila, the daughter-in-law. This marks her comeback to Malayalam Television after 2 years. Actor Niyas Musliar also plays the lead role of Arvind Raj. Meera Nair who made her debut in Njan Prakashan plays the character of Meera, the progressive mother-in-law. Newcomer Srikanth plays Meera's conservative son Nikhil. Later replaced by Prem Jacob

== Adaptations ==
Language	Title	Original release	Network(s)	Last aired	Notes
Marathi	Aggabai Sasubai अग्गंबाई सासूबाई	22 July 2019	Zee Marathi	13 March 2021	Original
Malayalam	Manam Pole Mangalyam മനംപോലെ മംഗല്യം	28 December 2020	Zee Keralam	2 January 2022	Remake
Tamil	Pudhu Pudhu Arthangal புதுப்புது அர்த்தங்கள்	22 March 2021	Zee Tamil	20 November 2022	Remake
Punjabi	Sasse Ni Sasse Tu Khushiyan Ch Vasse ਸੱਸੇ ਨੀ ਸੱਸੇ ਤੂੰ ਖੁਸ਼ੀਆਂ ਚ ਵੱਸੇ	25 April 2022	Zee Punjabi	23 September 2022	Remake
Kannada	Shreerastu Shubhamastu ಶ್ರೀರಸ್ತು ಶುಭಮಸ್ತು	31 October 2022	Zee Kannada	31 August 2025	Remake
