= Shreerastu Shubhamastu =

Indian Kannada language drama TV series

- Genre: Drama
- Directed by: Sudesh K. Rao
- Starring: See below
- Country of origin: India
- Original language: Kannada
- No. of episodes: 859

Production
- Production locations: Bengaluru, Karnataka, India
- Camera setup: Multi-camera
- Running time: 22 minutes

Original release
- Network: Zee Kannada
- Release: 31 October 2022 – 31 August 2025

Shreerastu Shubhamastu is an Indian Kannada language drama series launched on Zee Kannada from 31 October 2022 to 31 August 2025. The show is an official remake of Zee Marathi's Aggabai Sasubai. It stars Sudha Rani, Ajith Hande in lead roles.

== Plot ==
Tulasi, a widow, finds a friend and supporter in her daughter-in-law Siri, who stands against her family and society to get Tulasi remarried.

== Cast ==
- Sudha Rani as Tulasi
- Ajith Hande as Madhav
- Deepak / Darshith as Samarth
- Chandana Raghavendra as Siri
- Venkat Rao as Dathatreya
- Arfath Shariff as Avinash
- Lavanya as Poorni
- Nethra Jadhav / Sapna deekshith as Sharvari
- Ananya Mohan as Nidhi
- Nakul sharma as Abhijith
- Deepa Katte as Sandhya

== Adaptations ==
Language	Title	Original release	Network(s)	Last aired	Notes
Marathi	Aggabai Sasubai अग्गंबाई सासूबाई	22 July 2019	Zee Marathi	13 March 2021	Original
Malayalam	Manam Pole Mangalyam മനംപോലെ മംഗല്യം	28 December 2020	Zee Keralam	2 January 2022	Remake
Tamil	Pudhu Pudhu Arthangal புதுப்புது அர்த்தங்கள்	22 March 2021	Zee Tamil	20 November 2022	Remake
Punjabi	Sasse Ni Sasse Tu Khushiyan Ch Vasse ਸੱਸੇ ਨੀ ਸੱਸੇ ਤੂੰ ਖੁਸ਼ੀਆਂ ਚ ਵੱਸੇ	25 April 2022	Zee Punjabi	23 September 2022	Remake
Kannada	Shreerastu Shubhamastu ಶ್ರೀರಸ್ತು ಶುಭಮಸ್ತು	31 October 2022	Zee Kannada	31 August 2025	Remake
