= Mersheena Neenu =

Indian actress

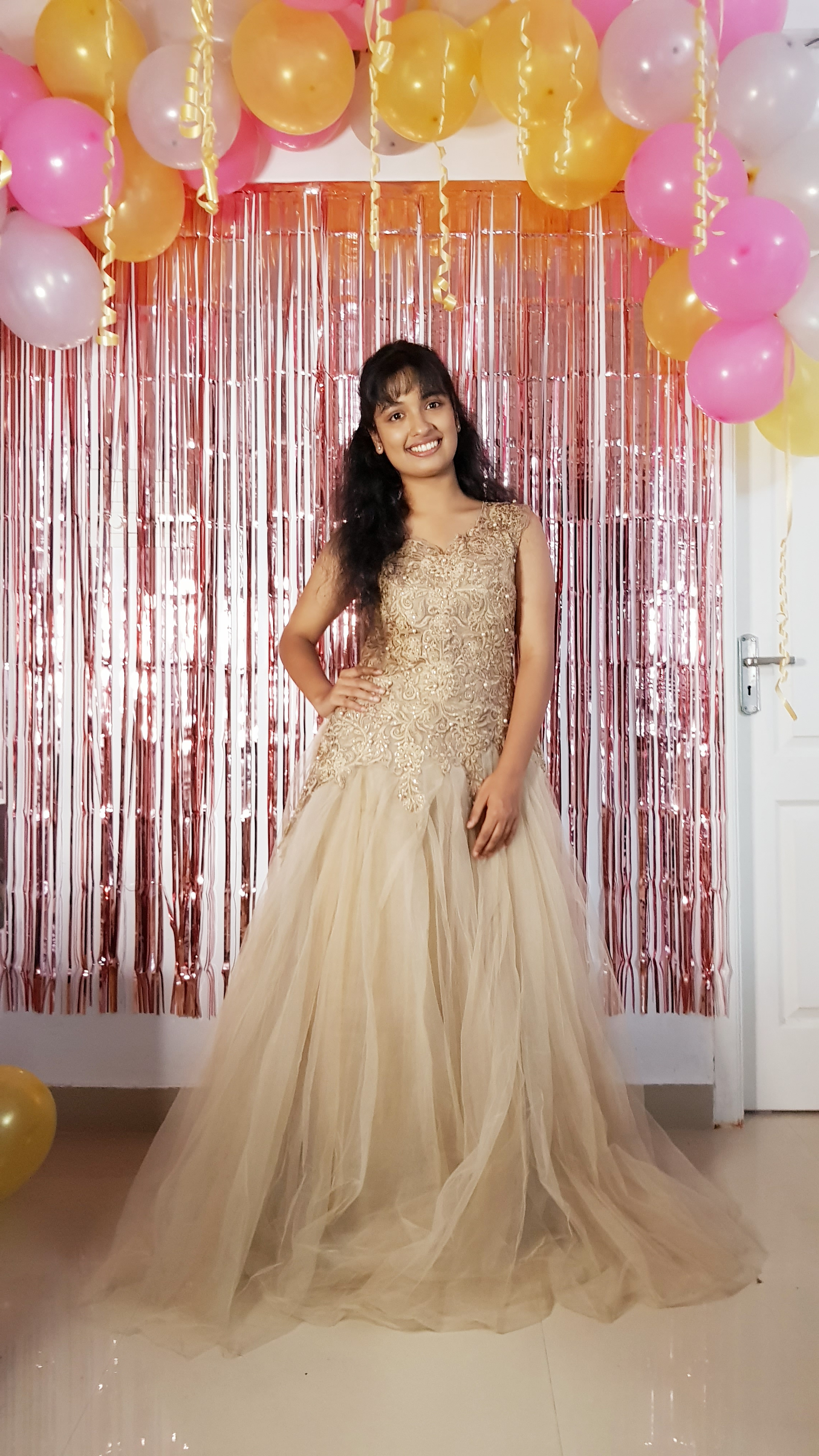
- Neenu at her birthday function
- Born: Perinthalmanna, Malappuram
- Other names: Neenu, Nidhi
- Occupations: Actress, Dancer, Model
- Parents: Abdul Nassar (father); Sajida (mother)
- Relatives: Rasna (sister)

Mersheena Neenu is an Indian actress who predominantly works in the Malayalam television industry along with a few Tamil films and serials.

== Personal life ==
She is the younger sister of actress Rasna, Paarijatham fame.

== Acting career ==
Neenu's first camera experience was when she was studying in UKG for an advertisement.

Neenu made her film acting debut with Wound in 2014. She also acted in a prominent role in the Tamil film Konjam Konjam (2017). She then did a guest appearance in Thamaasha (2019), a Malayalam movie. At the same time she acted in some television serials also. She rose to fame among the Malayali audience in the series 'Ayalathe Sundari' on Surya where she acted as deaf and dumb.

Her debut Tamil TV serial, Agni Natchathiram telecasted on Sun TV but the serial had to be abandoned due to the difficulty of traveling in COVID-19. She acted a negative role in Agni Natchathiram as Akhila, around 230 episodes.

In the meantime she started acting the lead role of Sathya Enna Penkutty on Zee Keralam. This tomboy character made her more popular among the Malayali audience. Since 2022, she has played the role of Shalini in Zee keralam series Kudumbashree Saradha.

== Filmography ==
=== Films ===
Year	Film	Role	Language	Notes
2014	Wound	Meena	Malayalam	Neenu's screen name as Nidhi
2017	Konjam Konjam	Divya	Tamil	
2019	Thamaasha		Malayalam	Guest appearance
2021	Premam 1986		Malayalam	Filming

=== Television ===
Year	Title	Role	Channel	Language	Notes
2005	Sindhoora Cheppu	Title song dancer	Amrita TV	Malayalam	
2015-2016	Manasariyathe	Theertha	Surya TV	Malayalam	
2017	Ayalathe Sundari	Madhusree Madhavan	Surya TV	Malayalam	
2018	Gauri	Gowrilekshmi	Surya TV	Malayalam	
2019	Thonyaksharangal	Ancy Varghese	Amrita TV	Malayalam	
2019-2020	Agni Natchathiram	Akhila	Sun TV	Tamil	Quit because of COVID-19 lockdown
2019-2021	Sathya Enna Penkutty	Sathyapriya(Sathya)	Zee Keralam	Malayalam	Remake of Odia series Sindura Bindu
2019	Super Bumper	Herself	Zee Keralam	Malayalam	
2019	OronnonnaraOnnu	Herself	Zee Keralam	Malayalam	
2020	Sumangali Bhava	Sathya	Zee Keralam	Malayalam	Guest appearance
2020	Kaiyethum Doorath	Sathya	Zee Keralam	Malayalam	Cameo in promo
2021	Vismayaraavu	Herself	Zee Keralam	Malayalam	
2021	Let's Rock & Roll	Herself	Zee Keralam	Malayalam	
2021	Karthika Deepam	Sathya	Zee Keralam	Malayalam	Guest appearance
2021	Red Carpet	Mentor	Amrita TV	Malayalam	
2022–2026	Kudumbashree Sharada	Shalini	Zee Keralam	Malayalam	Remake of Telugu series Radhamma Kuthuru
2022	Neeyum Njnaum	Herself	Zee Keralam	Malayalam	Cameo appearance
2022	Mandhira Punnagai	Gayathri	Colors Tamil	Tamil	Remake of Hindi series Ishq Mein Marjawan 2 Replaced By Supritha Sathyanarayanan
2022-2023	Zee Keralam Mahotsavam	Herself	Zee Keralam	Malayalam	
2023	Mizhirandilum (TV series)	Shalini	Zee Keralam	Malayalam	Mahasangamam episodes
2023	Anuraga Ganam Pole	Shalini	Zee Keralam	Malayalam	guest appearance
2024	Mangalyam	Shalini	Zee Keralam	Malayalam	guest appearance
2026	Akale	Shalini	Zee Keralam	Malayalam	guest appearance

=== Musical album ===
Year	Title	Language	Music	Direction	Coactor
2016	Onapperunal	Malayalm	Kaarthik Shankar	Kaarthik Shankar	Kaarthik Shankar
2019	Priyam	Malayalam	Anil Damodaran	Santhosh Cherthala	Biju Kurup
