= Pudhu Pudhu Arthangal (TV series) =

2020 Indian-Tamil language TV series

- Genre: Drama; Family
- Written by: Dialogues; Padmavathy; Maarimuthu
- Directed by: N. Priyan; Sai Marudu; Pavan; M. Shankar
- Starring: Devayani; Parvathy Venkitaramanan; Abhishek Shankar
- Theme music composer: Sai Bharath
- Opening theme: "Kanaa Unnai Kana"
- Composer: Vishal Chandrasekhar (Title Track)
- Country of origin: India
- Original language: Tamil
- No. of seasons: 1
- No. of episodes: 536

Production
- Executive producer: Faisal Saleem C.S
- Producer: Xavier Britto
- Cinematography: Muthuvel Srinivasan
- Camera setup: Multi-camera
- Running time: approx. 20–25 minutes per episode
- Production company: Esthell Entertainers

Original release
- Network: Zee Tamil
- Release: 22 March 2021 – 20 November 2022

Pudhu Pudhu Arthangal (transl. New Meanings) was an Indian Tamil-language family television drama that aired on Zee Tamil and streamed on ZEE5. The series premiered on 22 March 2021 and featured Devayani, Abhishek Shankar, and Parvathy Venkitaramanan in the lead roles. It is an official remake of the Zee Marathi series Aggabai Sasubai. The series ended on 20 November 2022 after 536 episodes.

The plot focuses on the life of Lakshmi, a widow with a peaceful personality. She looks after her son Santhosh and cares for her father-in-law Thiruvenkadam, but does not take care of herself. After Santhosh gets married, the show focuses on how Lakshmi's daughter in law Pavithra strives to bring a little joy to Lakshmi's life. Santhosh and Pavithra try to get Lakshmi to marry her favorite chef, Hari Krishnan.

== Plot ==
After Santhosh and Pavithra, Lakshmi goes with them to a hotel restaurant for a meal. The hotel is owned by renowned chef Hari Krishnan, who notices Lakshmi and falls for her. Lakshmi and her family return to the restaurant many more times.

Hari loves puliyodorai (tamarind rice), and especially loves the puliyodorai made in a certain temple. He is desperate to find the woman who cooks it, unaware that it is Lakshmi. When Hari learns that Lakshmi is the cook, he falls deeper in love with her. Their relationship progresses, but Prathiba, a cunning woman who despises Lakshmi, begins to plot to ruin Lakshmi's and Hari's relationship.

Prathiba uses Santhosh as a weapon against Lakshmi and Hari, as Santhosh and Hari dislike each other. Hari Krishnan is offended when Santhosh confronts him, and humiliates Santhosh in front of his colleagues. This incident worsens the relationship between Santhosh and Lakshmi.

Few months later

Hari Krishnan moves into Lakshmi's apartment as a tenant, having run into financial difficulties due to his restaurant closing because of Santhosh. This irritates Santhosh very much and he refuses to speak to Lakshmi. Hari Krishnan receives an order for food, but he rejects the order since he doesn't have a large kitchen and enough pots. Lakshmi suggests getting the help of other flatmates, which allows Hari to complete the order. Hari Krishnan then cooks in a television show that is shot in the apartment parking area, irritating Santhosh. He complains to the municipality corporation, but Pavithra clears the matter and helps the filmmakers. Santhosh thinks that Lakshmi had influenced the municipality, and quarrels with her.

When an election for municipality secretary occurs, Prathiba stands for election. Pavithra tells Lakshmi to stand for election and Lakshmi stands, irritating Prathiba. Prathiba manipulates Santhosh, who demands that Lakshmi does not stand in the upcoming election, but Pavithra supports Lakshmi. Frustrated, Prathiba plans to swap the ballot boxes after the voting, but Maddy (Hari Krishnan's personal secretary) finds out, recording their conversation and showing it to Hari.

A few months later, Aravind is introduced as an engaged man without parents to bring to his wedding. Aravind loves his fiancé so much that he cannot leave her, so he lies that his parents are abroad and they will come on the wedding day. While giving out invitations to his friends, he is involved in an car accident caused by Santosh. Lakshmi takes care of Aravind and he doesn't tell the police.

Lakshmi visits Aravind's fiancé's house with Hari, and the two plan to pretend to be Aravind's parents. On the wedding day, the fiancé's uncle speaks ill about Lakshmi for not wearing her Thali and Metti chains, but as she is a widow she cannot wear them. In response, Hari puts the chains in Lakshmi, but this enrages Thiruvenkadam and Santhosh, and they force Lakshmi into a ceremony to take off the Thali. Suddenly, Lakshmi becomes very ill and the ceremony is stopped. Hari takes care of her, but Santhosh refuses to let her come home, forcing her to stay at Hari's house for a week. Pavithra comes to Hari Krishnan's house to help take care of Lakshmi. Later, Santhosh and Thiruvenkadam allow Lakshmi to come back to their house. Lakshmi recovers and passes the time brewing tea in Santhosh's office, infuriating him.

Aadhira is introduced when she is transferred from Mumbai to Santhosh's office. Aadhira falls in love with Santhosh and wishes to marry him. Aadhira introduces her father to Santhosh, and he dies a few days later. Grieving, Aadhira asks Santhosh to stay with her, and he agrees to stay for a few nights as a supportive friend. A few days in, Aadhira becomes pregnant, but Santhosh denies having sex with her. Aadhira asks Prathiba to give a folder to Pavithra, which contains photographs of Santhosh and Aadhira in the same bed. Pavithra is furious with Santhosh, and angry with Lakshmi for supporting her son's denial. She leaves and moves in with Hari. Santhosh goes to Pavithra's house and meets her father Raghavan, where he again denies having sex with Pavithra, but Raghavan does not believe him and throws him out.

Later, Prathiba plans to steal money from the municipality. She organises for people to trick Lakshmi into giving out the bank details, and Lakshmi is framed by Prathiba when 5 lakhs are stolen. Lakshmi is arrested, and Pavithra sells her jewels to pay Lakshmi's bail. Lakshmi finds 5 lakhs cash in Santhosh's cupboard, leading to Santhosh being fired from his job.

== Cast ==
=== Main ===
- Devayani Rajakumaran as Lakshmi
  - A widow and Hari Krishnan's eventual wife, she is kind and a dedicated housewife; Santhosh's mother; Pink FM's radio jockey (2021–2022)
- Parvathy Venkitaramanan as Pavithra (Pavi)
  - A bold and straightforward girl. She is Santhosh's lover and later wife; Raghavan and Vaidhei's daughter (2021–2022)
- Abhishek Shankar as Hari Krishnan (Hari)
  - A popular celebrity chef and owner of Hari's kitchen restaurant, and Lakshmi's husband (2021–2022)
- Niyaz Khan as Santhosh (Kutty):
  - Lakshmi's son; Pavithra's husband and Thiruvenkadam's grandson (2021–2022)

=== Recurring ===
- Dindigul I. Leoni (2021) / Jayaraj Periyamayathevar (2021–2022) as Thiruvenkadam: Santhosh's grandfather
- Devipriya as Prathiba: Lakshmi's neighbor; she hates Lakshmi (2021–2022)
- K. S. Jayalakshmi as Parimalam: Lakshmi's neighbor and Prathiba's sidekick (2021–2022)
- Akshaya Kimmy as Maddy: Hari Krishnan's assistant and manager of Hari's kitchen (2021–2022)
- Karpagavalli as Archana: Lakshmi's neighbor and friend (2021–2022)
- Swetha as Geetha: Lakshmi's neighbor; Anitha and Anu's mother; Saravanan's second wife (2021–2022)
- Aishwarya (2021) / Jayashree Binuraj (2021–2022) as Leena: Lakshmi's neighbor and Divya's mother
- Vincent Roy (2021) / Vijay Krishnaraj (2021–2022) as Natarajan: Komathi's husband, Thiruvenkadam's friend and Lakshmi's neighbor
- Shanthi as Komathi: Natarajan's wife (2021–2022)
- Vedha Das as Saravanan: Geetha's second husband (2021–2022)
- Ranjana Sudarshan as Anitha: Geetha's elder daughter (2021–2022)
- Kamatchi as Anu: Geetha's younger daughter (2021–2022)
- Ramesh Khanna (2021) / Ashok (2021–2022) as Raghavan: Pavithra and Arun's father; Santhosh's father-in-law
- Sheela as Vaidehi: Pavithra and Arun's mother; Santhosh mother-in-law (2021–2022)
- Varun Udhay as Pink FM's manager (2022)
- Swetha Subramaniam as RJ Aanandhi Pink FM's staff (2022)
- Vandhana Michael as Sonia: She seeks vengeance against Lakshmi with the help of Prathiba (2022)
- Shalini as Narmadha: Hari Krishnan's college junior
- Tharun Appasamy as Arun: Pavithra's younger brother; Raghavan and Vaidehi's son (2021–2022)
- Sreenidhi Sudharshan as Divya: Leena's daughter, Lakshmi's neighbor and Arun's love interest (2021–2022)
- Rickna as Urmila: Divya's friend (2021–2022)
- Mani Thangarasu as Mani: Arun's friend (2021–2022)
- KPY Sarath as Lokesh: Arun's friend (2021–2022)
- Neethu Chinju (2021–2022) / Sahana Shetty (2022) as Aadhira: Santhosh's Office employee, in love with Santhosh
- Saakshi Siva as Mahesh: Santhosh office Manager (2022)
- Kousalya Senthamarai as Mahesh's mother (2022)
- Shravan Dwaragnath as Aadhira's fake father (2022)
- Visalakshi Manikandan as Aadhira's fake mother (2022)

=== Cameos ===
- Aadukalam Naren as Ramanathan: Raghavan's friend (2021)
- Nithya Ravindran as Kamala: Ramanathan's wife (2021)
- Diwakar as an Auto driver (2021)
- Srividya as Hari Krishnan's mother (2021, Posthumous Photographic Appearance)
- Namitha as herself: She came to Sneha apartments for Hari Krishnan's cooking class (2021)
- Vanitha Vijayakumar as herself: She came for an interview with Lakshmi at Pink FM (2022)
- RJ Balaji as Elango: The school teacher (From the character of Veetla Vishesham movie, 2022)
- Aparna Balamurali as Sowmya: Elango's lover (From the character of Veetla Vishesham movie, 2022)
- Rachitha Mahalakshmi as Adv. Jansi Rani (2022)
- Nachathira
- Vishnu as Sanjay (2022)
- Sanjeev Venkat

== Production ==
=== Casting ===
The series features film actress Devayani in the main female role of Lakshmi. Actor Abhishek Shankar was chosen for the male role, who had previously acted with Devayani as her partner in the TV series Kolangal. "Sun TV" presenter Parvathy made her first acting debut on television in the role of Lakshmi's daughter-in-law. TV actor Niyaz Khan was selected as the role of Lakshmi's son, and debate anchor Dindigul I. Leonie was cast in the role of Lakshmi's father-in-law.

== Release ==
=== Promo ===
The first promo was released on 8 March 2021, International Women's Day, and the second promo was released on 15 March 2021 on YouTube.

== Special episodes ==
- On its launching, the series was broadcast for one hour on two consecutive days without any commercial breaks.
- On 17 October 2021, a special episode for Hari and Lakshmi's marriage aired for two and a half hours with no breaks, and was entitled Pudhu Pudhu Arthangal Mega Thirumana Vaibhavam.
- From 13 December 2021 to 25 December 2021, this series broadcast a forty-five minutes special episode in prime time.
- On 16 January 2022, this series broadcast a two and half hour special episode about Aadhira's pregnancy, titled as Pudhu Pudhu Arthangal MEGA Sunday Kondattam.
- On 21 August 2022, this series broadcast a special episode on Sunday regarding the bailing out of Hari Krishnan, titled as Pudhu Pudhu Arthangal Sunday Special.

== Adaptations ==
Language	Title	Original release	Network(s)	Last aired	Notes
Marathi	Aggabai Sasubai अग्गंबाई सासूबाई	22 July 2019	Zee Marathi	13 March 2021	Original
Malayalam	Manam Pole Mangalyam മനംപോലെ മംഗല്യം	28 December 2020	Zee Keralam	2 January 2022	Remake
Tamil	Pudhu Pudhu Arthangal புதுப்புது அர்த்தங்கள்	22 March 2021	Zee Tamil	20 November 2022	Remake
Punjabi	Sasse Ni Sasse Tu Khushiyan Ch Vasse ਸੱਸੇ ਨੀ ਸੱਸੇ ਤੂੰ ਖੁਸ਼ੀਆਂ ਚ ਵੱਸੇ	25 April 2022	Zee Punjabi	23 September 2022	Remake
Kannada	Shreerastu Shubhamastu ಶ್ರೀರಸ್ತು ಶುಭಮಸ್ತು	31 October 2022	Zee Kannada	31 August 2025	Remake
