= Avhiroop Mazzumdar =

- Born: 16 July 1985 (age 40); Kolkata, West Bengal, India
- Occupations: Television Director, Film Director, Creative Producer, Creative Director, Writer, Editor
- Years active: 2006–present
- Known for: Tumm Se Tumm Tak, Suman Indori, Rabb Se Hai Dua, Teri Meri Ikk Jindri, Manmohini, Fear Files, Kyunki Saas Bhi Kabhi Bahu Thi, Miley Jab Hum Tum, Sangam, Delhi Diary

Avhiroop Mazzumdar, born Abhiroop Dutta Mazumdar is an Indian television and film director/creative director who is associated with popular television shows like Tumm Se Tumm Tak, Suman Indori, Rabb Se Hai Dua, Pyar Ka Pehla Adhyaya: Shiv Shakti, Teri Meri Ikk Jindri, Manmohini, Fear Files, Koi Laut Ke Aaya Hai, Tashn-E-Ishq, Miley Jab Hum Tum, Sangam, Kyunki Saas Bhi Kabhi Bahu Thi, Kasturi, and many others popular Indian TV soaps. He has also directed Delhi Diary, a documentary on 100 years of New Delhi which was released by Chief Minister Sheila Dikshit. He has made several other documentaries and films, including Astitva, Sabr, Sambhav. Sabr won the Best Jury and Best Non-Fiction Awards at the National Film and Video Festival (Student Edition). He also received La Fémis Scholarship in Paris in 2007. Avhiroop's short film, Cognition was felicitated at BYOFF and Inscreen (Orissa).

== Television shows ==
Show Name	Role
Tumm Se Tumm Tak	Creative Producer
Suman Indori	Creative Producer
Pyar Ka Pehla Adhyaya: Shiv Shakti	Creative Producer
Rabb Se Hai Dua	Creative Producer
Teri Meri Ikk Jindri	Creative Director
Manmohini	Creative Director
Fear Files 3	Creative Director
Koi Laut Ke Aaya Hai	Creative Director
Darr Sab Ko Lagta Hai	Creative Head
Tashan E Ishq	Creative Head
Fear Files 2	Creative Head
Maharkshak Devi	Creative Head
Maharakshak Aryan	Creative Head
Miley Jab Hum Tum	Creative Supervisor
Mohe Rang De	Creative Director
Sangam	Creative Supervisor
Kyunki Saas Bhi Kabhi Bahu Thi	Director
Kya Dil Mein Hai	Associate Creative Head
Kasturi	Associate Creative Head

== Web series ==
Web Series	Role
Durr Se Namaste	Creative Producer
Poison	Post Producer
Haq Se	Post Producer

== Short films and documentary films ==
Film	Role
India Reads	Director & Editor
New Delhi World Book Fair	Director & Editor
Delhi Diary	Director, Cinematographer & Editor
Cognition	Director
Aastitva	Director
Sabr	Editor
Birth of a Pillow	Editor
Sambhav	Director
The Day Before You Came	Cinematographer & Editor
Anna's Kitchen	Cinematographer & Editor
In Search for the Lost Shoe	Director, Cinematographer & Editor
