= Kanwalpreet Singh =

Kanwalpreet Singh may refer to:

- Kanwalpreet Singh (field hockey)
- Kanwalpreet Singh (actor)
