= Bhabhi =

Bhabhi may refer to:

- Bhabhi (1938 film), a 1938 Hindi film
- Bhabhi (1957 film), a 1957 Hindi film
- Bhabhi (1991 film), a 1991 Hindi film
- Bhabhi (TV series), a 2002 Hindi TV series aired on StarPlus
- Savita Bhabhi, a 2008, highly controversial, mildly pornographic online cartoon strip series about a “bored Indian housewife”
- Vilayati Bhabhi, a 2020 Punjabi TV series aired on Zee Punjabi
