= Shubhangi Latkar =

Indian actress

- Born: Mumbai, Maharashtra, India
- Occupation: Actress
- Years active: 1997–present
- Spouse: Sanjeev Latkar (m. 1995)
- Children: 2

Shubhangi Latkar is an Indian actress who acts in Hindi and Marathi films and television along with few Telugu and Malayalam films. She is known for her roles in Delhi Belly (2011), Aashiqui 2 (2013), Singham Returns (2014) and Jolly LLB 2 (2017), Bodyguard and The Fame Game.

== Filmography ==
=== Films ===
Year	Title	Role	Language
2009	Zor Lagaa Ke... Haiya!	Teacher	Hindi
2011	Delhi Belly	Mrs. Kohli	Hindi
2011	Bodyguard	Reema	Hindi
2013	Aashiqui 2	Subhandra Shirke	Hindi
2013	Rajjo	Chandu's mother	Hindi
2014	Singham Again	Mrs. Kamat	Hindi
2014	Nee Jathaga Nenundali	Gayatri's mother	Telugu
2015	Aawhan	MLA's wife	Marathi
2016	Force 2	Rudra's mother	Hindi
2017	Jolly LLB 2	Dr. Hema Deshpande	Hindi
2018	Hate Story 4	Natasha's mother	Hindi
2019	Junction Varasani	Anjali's mother	Hindi
2022	A Thursday	Kusum Jaiswal	Hindi
2022	Dharmaveer	Meentai Thackeray	Marathi
2022	Kartoot	Farida	Hindi
2024	MyLek	Ajji	Marathi
2024	Gharat Ganpati	Sunanda Bhau Gharat	Marathi
2025	Gaav Bolavato	Sangram's mother	Marathi
2025	L2: Empuraan	Bahija Begum	Malayalam

=== Television ===
Year	Serial	Role	Channel
1997	Ek Aur Mahabharat	Rajmata Satyavati	Zee TV
2000–2001	Shaktimaan	Arundhati	DD National
2004–2008	Adhuri Ek Kahani	Amruta's mother	Zee Marathi
2011–2012	Pinjara	Tatya's wife	Zee Marathi
2013–2014	Do Dil Bandhe Ek Dori Se	Lata Baburam Seharia	Zee TV
2014–2015	Pukaar	Jyoti Amarjeet Shergill	Life OK
2015–2016	Mohi	Susheela Manohar Gokhale	StarPlus
2015–2016	Ishq Ka Rang Safed	Durga Dashrath Tripathi	Colors TV
2016	Rishton Ka Saudagar – Baazigar	Mrs. Trivedi	Life OK
2016–2017	Sanyukt	Ila Govardhan Mehta	Zee TV
2016–2018	Love Lagna Locha	Raghavendra's mother	Zee Yuva
2018–2019	Yeh Teri Galiyan	Komila Singh	Zee TV
2019–2020	Shubharambh	Vrinda Chagan Dave	Colors TV
2021	Zindagi Mere Ghar Aana	Shabana	StarPlus
2023–2024	Man Dhaga Dhaga Jodte Nava	Sarthak's mother	Star Pravah
2024	Abeer Gulal	Sulakshana Nimbalkar	Colors Marathi
2025–present	Ganga Mai Ki Betiyan	Ganga Mai	Zee TV
