= Konjam Konjam =

- Theatrical release poster
- Directed by: Uday Sankaran
- Written by: Uday Sankaran
- Produced by: Betty C.K; P.R.Mohan
- Starring: Gokul Krishna; Priya Mohan; Mersheena Neenu; Appukutty; Mansoor Ali Khan
- Cinematography: P.R. Nikki Kannam
- Edited by: Renjith Touchriver
- Music by: Vallavan
- Production company: Mimosa Productions
- Distributed by: Action Reaction
- Release date: 22 September 2017
- Country: India
- Language: Tamil

Konjam Konjam (transl. Little by little) is a 2017 Indian Tamil-language romantic family drama film written and directed by debutant Uday Sankar and starring Priya Mohan, Gokul Krishnan, and Mersheena Neenu in prominent roles. Produced by Betty C.K and P.R.Mohan under their Mimosa Productions company. Production for the film began during January 2016. The film was released on 22 September 2017.

== Cast ==
- Gokul Krishna as Thirunavukarasu
- Priya Mohan as Thilakavathi
- Mersheena Neenu as Divya
- Appukutty as Shiva Balan
- Mansoor Ali Khan as Kodumudi Babu
- Vinodhini as Kodumudi Babu's Wife
- Jangiri Madhumitha
- A.K.Thavassi as Sudaly
- Shivadhanu as Senthamilan
- Pradeep Kottayam as Broono
- Jayan Cherthala as S.I Jaya Kumar
- Sharmila Thapa as Thapa
- Shanthi Mani as Parvathy
- Rajini Murali as Rajini Teacher
- Mahalakshmi as Thamarai
- Gayathri as Radha
