= Sasse Ni Sasse Tu Khushiyan Ch Vasse =

Indian Punjabi television series

- Genre: Romance; Drama
- Written by: Ramnik Kohlon
- Screenplay by: Diksha Tham
- Directed by: Sukriti Das
- Starring: See below
- Music by: Harman Sharma
- Country of origin: India
- Original language: Punjabi
- No. of episodes: 110

Production
- Producer: Damini Shetty
- Editor: Santosh Singh
- Camera setup: Multi-camera
- Running time: 22 minutes
- Production company: Eternal Frame Productions

Original release
- Network: Zee Punjabi
- Release: 25 April – 23 September 2022

Related
- Aggabai Sasubai

Sasse Ni Sasse Tu Khushiyan Ch Vasse (transl. May you live in happiness, mother in law) is an Indian Punjabi language television series which aired on Zee Punjabi. It premiered from 25 April 2022 and ended on 23 September 2022 completing 110 episodes. It starred Kanchan Rai, Dil Dilveer and Preety Parri. It is an official remake of Marathi TV series Aggabai Sasubai.

== Plot ==
A daughter-in-law defies societal norms and facilitates the wedding of her mother-in-law despite facing several odds for the sake of her happiness.

== Cast ==
- Kanchan Rai as Ramneek
- Dil Dilveer as Vikrant
- Preety Pari as Amrita
- Sunit Sharma as Soham
- Gurpreet Sarwara
- Shweta Sarangal
- VJ Aman

== Adaptations ==
Language	Title	Original release	Network(s)	Last aired	Notes
Marathi	Aggabai Sasubai अग्गंबाई सासूबाई	22 July 2019	Zee Marathi	13 March 2021	Original
Malayalam	Manam Pole Mangalyam മനംപോലെ മംഗല്യം	28 December 2020	Zee Keralam	2 January 2022	Remake
Tamil	Pudhu Pudhu Arthangal புதுப்புது அர்த்தங்கள்	22 March 2021	Zee Tamil	20 November 2022	Remake
Punjabi	Sasse Ni Sasse Tu Khushiyan Ch Vasse ਸੱਸੇ ਨੀ ਸੱਸੇ ਤੂੰ ਖੁਸ਼ੀਆਂ ਚ ਵੱਸੇ	25 April 2022	Zee Punjabi	23 September 2022	Remake
Kannada	Shreerastu Shubhamastu ಶ್ರೀರಸ್ತು ಶುಭಮಸ್ತು	31 October 2022	Zee Kannada	31 August 2025	Remake
