= Punjabiyan Di Dadagiri With Bhajji =

Punjabi reality quiz television game show

- Logo
- Also known as: Punjabiyan Di Dadagiri
- Genre: Quiz show
- Presented by: Harbhajan Singh
- Opening theme: Challugi ji Challugi Punjabiyan Di Dadagiri
- Ending theme: Challugi ji Challugi Punjabiyan Di Dadagiri
- Country of origin: India
- Original language: Punjabi
- No. of seasons: 1

Production
- Running time: 90 minutes

Original release
- Network: Zee Punjabi
- Release: 4 September 2021 – 8 January 2022

Punjabiyan Di Dadagiri With Bhajji is an Indian Punjabi language quiz show. The program aired on Zee Punjabi from 4 September 2021 and ended on 8 January 2022. Former cricketer Harbhajan Singh hosted this show.

== Rounds ==
Sometimes some random rounds occurs during these main rounds.

=== Toss ===
Six selected contestants from the states of Punjab could participate in this round. Four clues were given for a single answer, from which the participants had to guess the answer. Depending on the question number, they can get 2, 4, 6 or 12 runs. Wrong answers will give participants 0 runs.

None are eliminated.

=== Power Play ===
The captains will ask participants some questions based on their categories. Top scorer in Toss round will get special advantage to choose captain of their choice. Rest pick slip from the bowl. If they answer without option, will get 12 runs. But with option, will get 6 runs. Wrong answer will cut 4 runs.

Two contestants are eliminated at the end of this round.

=== Free Hit ===
A girl will come to act. Contestants will have to guess the thing. Each contestant will get a streak of 6 things to guess.

None are eliminated.

=== Full Toss ===
The host will ask contestants some questions with two options. The first to press the buzzer will get the opportunity to answer. If the answer gets correct, contestants will get 6 runs. Otherwise, will get -4 runs.

Two contestants are eliminated at the end of this round.

=== Cover Drive ===
The remaining duo is head-to-head in this final obstacle to victory. The contestants are told to decide from six subjects alternatively, from which they will be asked questions. If contestant don't know the answer, they can take help from captain two times. Challenge is available in this round.

The contestant who has scored more runs wins the game.

== Winning districts ==
- Season 1 – Amritsar
