= Lagnachi Wife Weddingchi Bayku =

2019 Indian Marathi language TV series

- Genre: Drama; Comedy
- Directed by: Amit Sawardekar
- Starring: See below
- Country of origin: India
- Original language: Marathi
- No. of episodes: 143

Production
- Producer: Sanjay Zankar
- Production locations: Aurangabad, Maharashtra
- Camera setup: Multi-camera
- Running time: 22 minutes
- Production company: Zankar Films

Original release
- Network: Zee Marathi
- Release: 21 October 2019 – 3 April 2020

Lagnachi Wife Weddingchi Bayku (transl. Wife of Marriage and Wife of Wedding) is an Indian Marathi-language television series which aired on Zee Marathi. It premiered from 21 October 2019 and ended on 3 April 2020 completing 143 episodes. It is produced by Sanjay Zankar under the banner of Zankar Films.

== Cast ==
=== Main ===
- Vijay Andalkar as Madan Nana Hingankar
- Leeana Anand as Mariya
- Rupali Zankar as Kajol Madan Hingankar

=== Recurring ===
- Shailesh Korade as Popat Nana Higankar
- Rekha Nirmal as Gaya Nana Hingankar
- Dnyaneshwari Deshpande as Rani Popat Hingankar
- Lalita Amrutkar as Mangal Nana Hingankar
- Sachin Rajpure as Rahul
- Bhanudas Patil as Rahul's father
- Sanket Jagdale as Gopu
- Rupesh Paratwagh as Mithun
- Nikita Kulkarni as Kajol's friend
- Nandkishor Chikhale as Banti

== Reception ==
Week	Year	BARC Viewership		Ref.
Week	Year	TRP	Rank	Ref.
Week 44	2019	4.3	3	
Week 48	2019	3.7	4	
Week 49	2019	4.0	2	
Week 50	2019	3.9	2	
Week 52	2019	4.1	3	
Week 53	2019	3.8	4	
Week 1	2020	3.6	4	
Week 2	2020	3.5	3	
Week 3	2020	3.3	5	
Week 4	2020	3.0	3	
Week 5	2020	3.1	5	
Week 6	2020	3.0	5	

== Adaptations ==
Language	Title	Original release	Network(s)	Last aired	Notes
Marathi	Lagnachi Wife Weddingchi Bayku लग्नाची वाईफ वेडिंगची बायकू	21 October 2019	Zee Marathi	3 April 2020	Original
Punjabi	Vilayati Bhabhi ਵਿਲਾਇਤੀ ਭਾਭੀ	13 January 2020	Zee Punjabi	15 January 2021	Remake
