= Girish Oak =

Indian actor

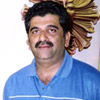
- Born: 17 August 1960 (age 65); Nagpur, Maharashtra, India
- Education: Bachelor of Ayurvedic Medicine and surgery.
- Alma mater: Maharashtra University of Health Sciences
- Occupation: Actor
- Years active: 1984 – present
- Spouse(s): Padmashree Phatak (m. 1985; div. 2004) Pallavi Oak (m. 2008)
- Children: 2 (including Girija Oak)

Girish Oak (born 17 August 1960) is a Marathi, editor, film actor, play actor and poetry writer. His play U Turn has become very popular. From 22 July 2019, he played a lead role in the Marathi serial Aggabai Sasubai on Zee Marathi and from 15 March 2021, he is playing a lead role in Aggabai Sunbai on Zee Marathi.

== Career ==
Oak was born in Nagpur. He completed his degree in Bachelor of Ayurveda, Medicine and Surgery. Girish Oak became a full-time actor because of his love for theatre. He was very active at the college level, he took part in the state plays competitions as well as intercollegiate ones. He started career acting in play from the year 1984. Oak has acted in many TV serials, plays and films. He also has acted his around 40+ plays and the same number of films. He has played comedy, serious or dramatic, he can portray the role effortlessly.

== Television ==
- Deep Jyoti
- Lakhat Ek Aamcha Dada
- Phulala Sugandha Maticha
- Aggabai Sunbai
- Aggabai Sasubai
- Pasant Aahe Mulgi
- Julun Yeti Reshimgathi
- Adhuri Ek Kahani
- Ya Sukhanno Ya
- Fu Bai Fu
- Pinjara
- Avantika
- Agnihotra
- Man Udhan Varyache
- Boss Majhi Ladachi
- Eka Hatachi Tali
- Paus Mrugacha Padato
- Paramveer
- Bandini
- Manachiye Gunti
- Prabhakar
- Are Sansar Sansar
- Duheri
- Eka Shwasache Antar
- Damini
- Kimayagar
- Saheb Bibi Aani Mi
- Zale Unhache Chandane
- Wadal
- Nivdung
- Hya Gojirwanya Gharat
- Chhoti Malkin
- Kukuchaku
- Puneri Misal
- Aaradhana
- Ahankar (Hindi)
- Daddy Samajha Karo (Hindi)
- Gruhdah (Hindi)

== Films ==
- Cappuccino (2014)
- Tu Hi Re (2015)
- Taani (2013)
- Khel Saat Baaracha (2010)
- Asa Mi Kay Gunha Kela (2010)
- Manatlya Manat (2009)
- Ticha Chukal Tari Kaay? (2009)
- Mi Amruta Boltey (2008)
- Humne Jeena Seekh Liya (2008)
- Baba Lagin (2007)
- Bhau Majha Pathi Rakha (2006)
- Maza Navara Tuzi Bayako (2006)
- Corporate (2006)
- Amhi Asu Ladke (2006)
- Zuluk (2005)
- Munnabhai S.S.C (2005)
- Saatchya Aat Gharat (2004)
- Tochi Ek Samarth (2004)
- Vishwavinayak (1994).
- Lavanyavati (1993)
- Paisa Paisa Paisa (1993)
- Shivrayachi Soon Tararani (1993).
- Wat Pahate Punvechi (1992)
- Jasa Baap Tashi Pora (1991)
- gol gol gara gara (2019)
- Govinda Naam Mera (2022)
- Lokshahi (2024)
- Juna Furniture (2024)
- Bin Lagnachi Goshta (2025)

== Plays ==
1) Deepstambh 2) U turn 3) Kusum Manohar Lele 4) Kahani Main Twist 5) Shree tashi Sau 6) Shadyantra 7) Love Birds 8) Welcome Jindagi 9) To mi navhech 10) Shivputra Sambhaji Mahanatya 11)Kaali Rani 12) 38 Krishna Villa 13) SUNDAR ME HONAR 14)Ti Phulrani 15) u turn 2 16) sukhanshi bhandato amhi 17) maze avkash vegale 18)sthal ale dhavun 19) tuza ahe tujapashi 20) Doctor tumhi suddha 21) nusta zengat

== Editor ==
- Astharoopa Jai Vaibhavlakshmi Maata (TV Movie) 2008

== Personal life ==
Girish oak is married to Pallavi Oak and they have a daughter Durga Oak. Girija Oak is the daughter of Marathi actor Girish Oak from First marriage.
