= Aalisha Panwar =

Indian actress (born 1996)

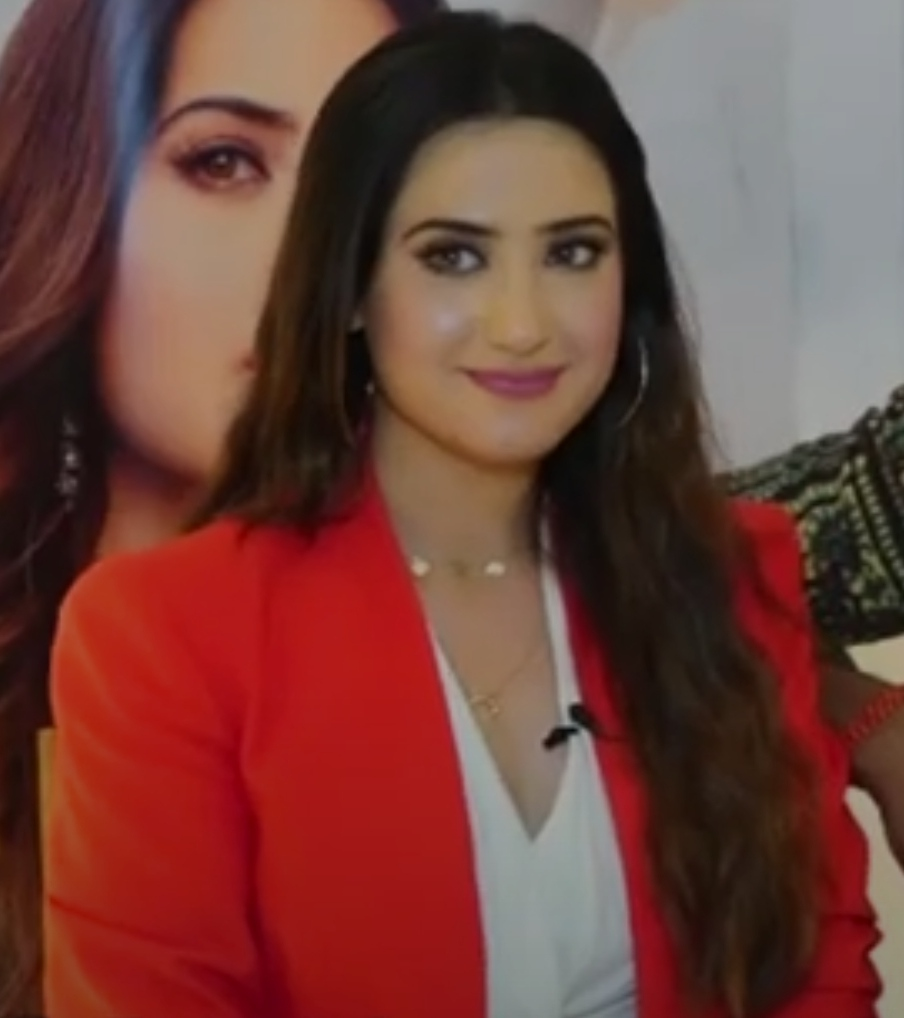
- Panwar in 2021
- Born: 7 May 1996 (age 30); Shimla, Himachal Pradesh, India
- Occupation: Actress
- Years active: 2012; 2015–present
- Known for: Ishq Mein Marjawan

Aalisha Panwar is an Indian actress who appears in television shows known for her work in Colors TV's thriller Ishq Mein Marjawan. In 2021, she played Avneet in Zee TV's Teri Meri Ikk Jindri.

== Early life ==
Panwar is from Shimla, Himachal Pradesh. Her mother, Anita Panwar, is a teacher at Chapslee School Shimla, and her father, Dinesh Panwar, is a lawyer.

In 2008, she participated in DD National's Nachein Gaen Dhoom Machaen. In 2012, she was crowned The Shimla Queen.

== Career ==
Panwar started her acting career in 2012 with the film Akkad Bakkad Bambe Bo. She made her television debut as Najma in Begusarai in 2015. In 2016, she played Aditi in Thapki Pyar Ki. She also worked in Jamai Raja and Rishton Ki Saudagar - Baazigar. From 2017 to 2019, Panwar portrayed Tara Raichand and Aarohi Kashyap in Ishq Mein Marjawan. Her next role was as a deceased character Madhuri Shirke in Star Bharat's Meri Gudiya. Panwar was seen short films Blind Love opposite Shagun Pandey and Ishqiyaat opposite Rrahul Sudhir. In 2023, she entered Kumkum Bhagya as Kaya.

== Filmography ==
=== Films ===
Year	Title	Role	Notes	Ref.
2012	Akkad Bakkad Bambe Bo	Teenager girl	Cameo	
2021	Blind Love	Naina	Short film	
2021	Blind Love 2	Naina	Short film	
2022	Ishqiyaat	Heer	Short film	
2022	Blind Love 3	Naina	Short film	
2023	Blind Love 4	Naina	Short film	

=== Television ===
Year	Title	Role	Ref.
2015	Begusarai	Najma Akhtar Khan	
2016	Jamai Raja	Aanya Sengupta	
2016	Rishton Ka Saudagar – Baazigar	Kritika Dave	
2016	Thapki Pyar Ki	Aditi	
2017–2018	Ishq Mein Marjawan	Aarohi Raj Singh	
2017–2019	Ishq Mein Marjawan	Tara Raj Singh	
2019	Laal Ishq	Nishtha Singh	
2019–2020	Meri Gudiya	Madhuri Shirke Gujral	
2020	Savdhaan India	Kriti	
2021	Teri Meri Ikk Jindri	Avneet	
2023	Kumkum Bhagya	Kaya Malhotra	Cameo
2023–2024	Nath – Krishna Aur Gauri Ki Kahani	Gauri Mishra	
2025	Lekar Hum Deewana Dil	Tara	Cameo (Guest role)

==== Special appearances ====
Year	Title	Role	Ref.
2017; 2018	Tu Aashiqui	Aarohi Raj Singh	
2018	Silsila Badalte Rishton Ka	Tara Raj Singh	
2018; 2019	Udaan Sapnon Ki	Tara Raj Singh	

=== Music videos ===
Year	Title	Singer	Ref.
2020	Khamoshiyan	Yuvraj Kochar	

== Awards and nominations ==
Year	Award	Category	Work	Result	Ref.
2018	Gold Awards	Best Actress in a Negative Role	Ishq Mein Marjawan	Nominated	
2019	Indian Television Academy Awards	Best Actress in a Negative Role	Ishq Mein Marjawan	Nominated	
2019	Indian Telly Awards	Best Actress in a Negative Role	Ishq Mein Marjawan	Nominated	
2022	Indian Television Academy Awards	Best Actress Drama	Teri Meri Ikk Jindri	Nominated	
