= Amandeep Sidhu =

Indian television actress (born 1999)

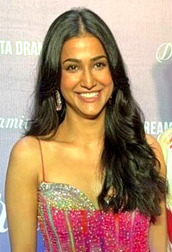
- Born: 5 July 1999 (age 27); Batala, Punjab, India
- Occupations: Model; actress
- Years active: 2018–present
- Known for: Teri Meri Ikk Jindri; Choti Sarrdaarni; Naagin 6; Chashni; Ganga Mai Ki Betiyan
- Height: 5 ft 8 in (1.73 m)
- Parent: Gurmeet Sidhu (mother)
- Relatives: Jasmeet Sidhu (sister)

Amandeep Sidhu (born 5 July 1999) is an Indian television actress who is best known as Mahi Arora in Teri Meri Ikk Jindri, as Mannat Dhillon in Choti Sarrdaarni and Sneha in Ganga Mai Ki Betiyan.

== Career ==
Sidhu started her career as a model and then entered the tv industry with the parallel lead role of Purva Sinha in Yeh Pyaar Nahi Toh Kya Hai. In the same year, she got the negative lead role of Kanchan Khanna in Tantra.

In 2021, she made a breakthrough in her career with her first positive lead role of Mahi Arora in Zee TV series Teri Meri Ikk Jindri opposite Adhvik Mahajan. In April 2022, she is playing the lead role of Mannat Dhillon in Colors TV series Choti Sarrdaarni opposite Gaurav Bajaj.

In August 2022, she joined Naagin 6, the sixth season of Colors TV's supernatural revenge franchise Naagin as Anmol Patel.

She portrayed the role of Noor Ahuja opposite Abhishek Kumar And Sheezan khan In the Dreamiyata Drama platform with the show Tu Aashiiki Haii produced by Ravi Dubey and Sargun Mehta. Since September 2025, Sidhu was seen portraying female lead Sneha in Zee TV's Ganga Mai Ki Betiyan.

== Media image ==
In 2026, she was listed in 30 Under 30 by the Indian edition of Variety.

== Filmography ==
=== Television ===
Year	Serial	Role	Notes	Ref.
2018	Yeh Pyaar Nahi Toh Kya Hai	Purva Sinha	Supporting Role	
2018–2019	Tantra	Kanchan Khanna	Negative Role	
2019	Vish Ya Amrit: Sitara	Hariyali	Negative Role	
2019	Paramavatar Shri Krishna	Rajkumari Rukmini / Maharani Rukmini	Lead Role	
2021	Teri Meri Ikk Jindri	Mahi Chopra Arora	Lead Role	
2022	Choti Sarrdaarni	Mannat Dhillon Singh Randhawa	Lead Role	
2022	Naagin 6	Anmol Patel	Negative Role	
2023	Chashni	Chandni Chopra Babbar	Lead Role	
2023–2024	Saubhagyavati Bhava: * Niyam Aur Shartein Laagu	Siya Sharma Jindal	Lead Role	
2024	Badall Pe Paon Hai	Bani Arora Khanna	Lead Role	
2024	Wagle Ki Duniya – Nayi Peedhi Naye Kissey	Bani Khanna	Episode 1110	
2025–present	Ganga Mai Ki Betiyan	Sneha Sharma	Lead Role	

=== Web Series ===
Year	Series	Role	Notes	Ref.
2025	Tu Aashiiki Haii	Noor	Lead Role	

=== Music videos ===
Year	Title	Singer	Ref.
2018	Dil Ibaadat	Ranjan Choudhary	

== See also ==
- List of Hindi television actresses
- List of Indian television actresses
