= Badall Pe Paon Hai =

Indian television series

Badall Pe Paon Hai is an Indian Hindi-language show broadcast on Sony SAB. It concerns Indian stock market, and was produced by Sargun Mehta.

== Story ==
The story of the serial revolves around a girl named Bani who tries to financially help her family in order to provide them a better life, contrary to traditional mentality.

== Cast ==
- Aastha Ahaani
- Sooraj Thapar
- Rudra Parmar
- Amandeep Sidhu
- Shefali Rana

== Reception ==
Chhavi Sharma writing for Mayapuri wrote the serial has "has won the hearts of the audience with its heartwarming story and powerful performances."
