= Kanwalpreet Singh (actor) =

Indian Actor and Singer

- Occupations: Actor; singer
- Years active: 2003–present

Kanwalpreet Singh is an Indian actor and singer who works in Punjabi and Hindi films, television and music videos.

== Career ==
Kanwalpreet Singh started out in the Punjabi film industry in 2013 before moving to Bollywood due to the lack of opportunities. He gained recognition for his role in Tamasha (2015) as Ranbir Kapoor's friend Dhillon and as Tiger Shroff's friend in Heropanti 2 (2022). He played a lower-middle-class man in the short film Zubaan (2018) and tanned his skin to prepare for the role. He played Sandy in the Punjabi television series Vilayati Bhabhi (2020) and Niyati Fatnani's brother Goldie in the Hindi television series Channa Mereya (2022).

== Filmography ==
Year	Film	Role	Language	Notes	Ref.
2013	Jai Maharashtra Dhaba Bhatinda		Marathi		
2013	Bikkar Bai Sentimental		Punjabi		
2013	Jatts in Golmaal		Punjabi		
2013	Naughty Jatts		Punjabi		
2015	Tamasha	Dhillon	Hindi		
2016	Mmirsa		Hindi		
2016	Tutak Tutak Tutiya; Devi; Abhinetri	Krishna's colleague	Hindi; Tamil; Telugu	Multilingual film	
2016	Mastizaade	Runner	Hindi		
2018	Zubaan		Punjabi	short film Won—Haryana International Film Festival Best Actor Award	
2018	Lucky Kabootar	Aulakh	Punjabi		
2019	Arjun Patiala		Hindi		
2022	Hai Tujhe Salaam India	Happy	Hindi		
2022	Heropanti 2	Babloo's friend	Hindi		
2023	Dil Dosti Deewangi	Pappu Sardar	Marathi		

=== Television ===
Year	Title	Role	Language	Network	Notes	Ref.
2003	Crime Patrol		Hindi	Sony TV		
2008	Taarak Mehta Ka Ooltah Chashmah		Hindi	Sony SAB		
2012	Savdhaan India		Hindi	Life OK; Star Bharat		
2012-13	Rab Se Sohna Isshq		Hindi	Zee TV		
2014	Nadaan Parindey Ghar Aaja		Hindi	Life OK		
2015	Code Red		Hindi	Colors TV		
2018	Hear Me Love Me		Hindi	Amazon Prime Video		
2019	Four More Shots Please!		English	Amazon Prime Video		
2020	Vilayati Bhabhi	Sukhwinder "Sandy" Singh	Punjabi	Zee Punjabi	Lead role	
2021	Gusto with GD		Hindi	YouTube		
2022	Channa Mereya	Goldie Garewal	Hindi	Star Bharat	Recurring role	
2025	Ek Farzi Love Story	Gurpreet Singh	Hindi	Amazon MX Player		

=== Music videos ===
Year	Title	Composer	Lyricist	Singer(s)	Language	Ref.
2020	Punjabi	Angel Beats	Simranjit Singh Hundal	Himself	Punjabi	
2021	Bacheyan Di Maa	The Noise Music	Simranjit Singh Hundal	Himself	Punjabi	
2022	Le Chal Mujhe	Annkur R Pathakk	Sachin Urmtosh	Annkur R Pathakk, Antara Bhattacharya	Punjabi	
2022	Wedding Song	Maaney	Maaney	Himself	Punjabi	
