= Teri Meri Ikk Jindri =

Indian television series (2021)

- Genre: Drama; Romance
- Created by: Prateek Sharma
- Developed by: Zee TV
- Written by: Dialogues; Amit Babbar
- Screenplay by: Fatima Rangila; Shubham Joshi
- Story by: Ranjeev-neetu
- Directed by: Prateek Shah
- Creative director: Avhiroop Mazzumdar
- Starring: Amandeep Sidhu; Adhvik Mahajan; Aalisha Panwar
- Music by: Paresh A Shah
- Country of origin: India
- Original languages: Hindi, Punjabi
- No. of seasons: 1
- No. of episodes: 228

Production
- Producers: Prateek Sharma; Suman Sharma
- Editors: Amit Singh; Pramod Maurya
- Camera setup: Multi-camera
- Running time: 22–25 minutes
- Production company: LSD Films

Original release
- Network: Zee TV
- Release: 27 January – 13 November 2021

Teri Meri Ikk Jindri is an Indian Hindi-language romantic drama television series broadcasting on Zee TV by replacing Guddan Tumse Na Ho Payega. It premiered on 27 January 2021 and is produced by Prateek Sharma, under the production of LSD Films. The series stars Amandeep Sidhu, Adhvik Mahajan and Aalisha Panwar.

== Plot ==
A carefree man who runs a dairy falls in love with an aspiring entrepreneur who wants to start a taxi service for women. Mahi and Jogi get married, but Mahi refuses to bow down. Mahi's sister's husband, Pappuji, breaks Jogi's legs. Mahi vows to take revenge and compete in Mrs. Amristar's Competition. There is a dance competition held between Chanda (Pappuji's sister) and Mahi. The competition begins between Mahi and Chanda. Jogi foils Chanda's attempt to hurt Mahi. Chanda retracts from the bet when Mahi wins the competition. Chanda strikes a deal with Renu to buy her silence. Pappu sides with Chanda in front of Shalu and states that Mahi is better than her. Meanwhile, Jogi gives a surprise to Mahi. Jogi believes that Mahi will fall in love with him. Seema tells Mahi to withdraw from the competition. When the competition gets scrapped, Jogi faces Pappu with Mahi and challenges him. Jogi's and Mahi's mother accept Mahi after the end of the competition. Later, Mahi professes her feelings to Jogi. In the process of saving Jogi's life, Mahi gets shot. Mahi's condition terrifies Jogi. Later, Mahi asks Jogi to fulfil her wish. But Jogi refuses to be a singer as he can't sing by his will. Sooner, Jogi's obsessed lover Avneet makes an entry. Rupa tells Mahi that before Jogi and her marriage, Jogi had an alliance with Avneet. Mahi fears getting separated from Jogi. Avneet first conspires against Seema( Mahi's mother) and then Aakash ( Mahi's younger brother). Also, Avneet is adamant to make Jogi sing.

== Cast ==
=== Main ===
- Adhvik Mahajan as Joginder "Jogi" Arora: Mahi's husband; Roopa's Son; Bishno's grandson; Laado's uncle (2021)
- Amandeep Sidhu as Mahi Arora (née Chopra): Jogi's wife; Seema and Dharmpal's youngest daughter; Shalu, Renu, and Akash's sister (2021)
- Aalisha Panwar as Avneet: Jogi's obsessive lover (2021)

=== Recurring ===
- Jaanvi Sangwan as Bishno "Beeji" Arora: Jogi's grandmother; Roopa's mother-in-law; Mahi's grandmother-in-law (2021)
- Vishavpreet Kaur as Roopa Arora: Jogi's mother; Mahi's mother-in-law; Bishno's daughter-in-law (2021)
- Puvika Gupta as Laado: Jogi's niece; Roopa's granddaughter; Bishno's great-granddaughter (2021)
- Netra Kapoor as Priya: Pankaj's wife; Mahi's best friend (2021)
- Shabaaz Abdullah Badi as Pankaj: Priya's husband; Jogi's Cousin brother and a supportive best friend (2021)
- Manoj Dutt as Madanlal Chopra: Dharampal's father; Seema's father-in-law; Mahi, Shalu, Renu, and Akash's grandfather (2021)
- Saniya Nagdev as Seema Chopra: Dharampal's wife; Mahi, Shalu, Renu, and Akash's mother (2021) (Dead)
- Mandeep Kumar Azad as Dharampal Chopra: Seema's husband; Mahi, Shalu, Renu, and Akash's father (2021)
- Manoj Chandila as Pratap Sehgal "Pappuji": Shalu's husband; Chanda's brother; Mahi, Renu and Akash's brother-in-law; Seema and Dharampal's son-in-law (2021)
- Shyn Khurana as Shalu Sehgal (née Chopra): Pappuji's wife; Seema and Dharampal's daughter; Mahi, Renu, and Akash's sister; Chanda's sister-in-law (2021)
- Coral Bhamra as Renu Sood (née Chopra): Deepak's wife; Seema and Dharampal's daughter; Mahi, Shalu, and Akash's sister (2021) (Dead)
- Raj Khosla as Deepak Sood: Renu's husband (2021)
- Arunim Mishra as Akash Chopra: Dharampal and Seema's son; Mahi, Shalu, and Renu's brother (2021)
- Aakash Mansukhani as Arjun Rai: Mahi's ex-fiancé; Rai Sahab's grandson; Chanda's boyfriend (2021)
- Sanatan Modi as Rai Sahab: Arjun's grandfather; Pankaj's Boss (2021) (Dead)
- Kavita Banerjee as Chanda Sehgal: Pappuji's sister; Arjun's girlfriend (2021)
- Manish Verma as Gulshan: Priya's ex-boyfriend (2021) (Shot by Pappu)

== Production ==
=== Filming ===
The series is filmed in Amritsar, Punjab.
