= Aggabai Sasubai =

2019 Indian Marathi-language TV series

- Genre: Drama; Family
- Written by: Kiran Kulkarni; Pallavi Karkera
- Directed by: Ajay Mayekar
- Starring: See below
- Theme music composer: Ashok Patki
- Opening theme: Aggabai Sasubai by Madhura Datar
- Country of origin: India
- Original language: Marathi
- No. of episodes: 432

Production
- Producer: Sunil Bhosale
- Camera setup: Multi-camera
- Running time: 22 minutes
- Production company: Someel Creations

Original release
- Network: Zee Marathi
- Release: 22 July 2019 – 13 March 2021

Related
- Aggabai Sunbai

Aggabai Sasubai is an Indian Marathi language TV series which aired on Zee Marathi. It is directed by Ajay Mayekar and produced by Sunil Bhosale under the banner of Someel Creations. It stars Nivedita Saraf, Tejashri Pradhan and Girish Oak in lead roles. It premiered from 22 July 2019 by replacing Tula Pahate Re.

The series is about Asavari Kulkarni, a middle-aged widow and single mother whose daughter in law Shubhra tries to get her remarried to Abhijeet Raje, a popular chef. Aggabai Sasubai had a sequel titled Aggabai Sunbai which was aired from 15 March to 21 August 2021 and starred actors Adwait Dadarkar and Uma Pendharkar for the roles of Soham and Shubhra respectively. Mohan Joshi replaced actor Ravi Patwardhan from January to March 2021 after Patwardhan's death.

== Plot ==
Asavari Kulkarni is a middle-aged widow living with her lazy son Soham Kulkarni and strict father-in-law Dattatray Kulkarni aka Aajoba in Sahajivan Society, a middle-class apartment in Thane, Maharashtra. Her unseen husband Prabhakar had died a couple decades ago and therefore she had to raise Soham as a single mother, causing neglect to her personal ambitions. Soon, Soham's former college-mate Shubhra announces to the Kulkarnis that she and Soham wish to marry each other. Asavari agrees to this but Aajoba objects their union. After having a register marriage in the absence of Aajoba, Soham and Shubhra have lunch along with Asavari in the restaurant of Abhijeet Raje, a popular chef to acts in a cookery show.

He falls in love with Asavari and sends her a sweet dish via Shubhra. That night, Asavari informs Abhijeet over the phone that she liked his sweet dish. Meanwhile, Soham and Shubhra's friends organize a stay for the two as a marriage gift. However, Aajoba turns furious on learning about this and forcefully makes them return home. The next day, Shubhra finds deceased Prabhakar's old camera while cleaning the store room which makes Asavari emotional. Aajoba secretly uploads the photograph of the camera on the internet in order to sell it. Later, the Kulkarnis go to a temple to perform a Pooja for Soham and Shubhra's new marriage. While there, Aajoba lashes out at Abhijeet upon mistaking him for stealing his sandals but Shubhra calms him down and takes him home. Abhijeet subsequently arrives at Asavari's house in order to buy the camera sold by Aajoba. Asavari accidentally mixes rice grains in his coffee as she gets baffled due to his unexpected arrival. She then gets emotional when Abhijeet gives her a cheque in exchange of the camera. On seeing her condition, Abhijeet deliberately leaves the camera at Asavari's house for her feelings. Further, Asavari goes to Abhijeet's restaurant to return him the cheque as Aajoba agrees to keep the camera as well. That night, Abhijeet sets out to drop Asavari home and the two have tea in the rain on the streets. Meanwhile, Soham and Aajoba are forced to order food from a restaurant as Soham is unable to heat the food cooked by Asavari. On returning home, Asavari feels guilty on seeing Aajoba's plight.

After a couple of days, Shubhra orders a microwave for Soham while Asavari goes to a vegetable market where Abhijeet meets her and gifts her a pumpkin. Abhijeet slowly decides to express his feelings for Asavari and invites her to his restaurant for dinner. However, she receives a phone-call from Soham who informs her that he has fallen off his scooter, making her rush back home. Abhijeet chases her and calls her downstairs where he confesses his love for her. A shocked Asavari is disappointed as Abhijeet thought of going beyond their friendship and tells him that she does not wish to marry him. At home, Shubhra points out to a distressed Asavari that Abhijeet loves her a lot and that he will keep her happy. Later, she explains to a shell-shocked Abhijeet downstairs that Asavari does not wish to remarry because she has a good life and family members. Meanwhile, Asavari feels hurt as Soham and Aajoba berate her over abandoning an injured Soham.

The next day, Shubhra meets a distressed Abhijeet and advises him not to meet Asavari until she admits that she loves him too. Later that day, Soham meets Abhijeet in his restaurant and while secretly going to his wallet, he is shocked to discover Asavari's photograph in it. Upon returning home, an infuriated Soham destroys Abhijeet's recipes written by Asavari in a notebook. That evening, Asavari calls up a grocery shop to order groceries. However, the number accidentally gets dialed to Abhijeet as she is plagued by his memories. Further, Asavari decides to go to the grocery shop. Meanwhile, Abhijeet realises Asavari's feelings for him and reaches her house to meet her. The two end up meeting each other downstairs. While there, Abhijeet makes Asavari admit that she is in love with him too and expresses his feelings for her just as they are overheard by Soham and Shubhra. Aajoba eventually realises his folly and agrees to their marriage. Abhijeet and Asavari get married.

== Cast ==
=== Main ===
- Tejashri Pradhan as Shubhra Anil Kamat / Shubhra Soham Kulkarni; Soham's wife, Asavari's daughter-in-law
- Nivedita Saraf as Asavari Prabhakar Kulkarni / Asavari Abhijeet Raje; Abhijeet's wife, Soham's mother, Shubhra's mother-in-law
- Girish Oak as Abhijeet Raje; Asavari's husband

=== Recurring ===
- Ashutosh Patki as Soham Prabhakar Kulkarni; Shubhra's husband, Asavari's son
- Ravi Patwardhan / Mohan Joshi as Dattatray Bandopant Kulkarni; Asavari's father-in-law
- Pratibha Goregaonkar as Sulabha Samant; Asavari's neighbour
- Sanjeevani Sathe as Pradnya Sunil Karkhanis; Asavari's neighbour
- Arun Mohre as Vidyadhar Karkhanis; Dattatray's friend
- Rajshri Potdar as Prabha Vidyadhar Karkhanis; Vidyadhar's wife
- Bhakti Ratnaparkhi as Mandodari Parab (Maddy); Abhijeet's P.A.
- Bhagyesh Patil as Vishwas; Abhi's Kitchen waiter
- Leena Athavale-Datar as Asha Anil Kamat; Shubhra's mother
- Shubhada Naik as Mrs. Date; Asavari's neighbour
- Nikhil Zope as Akshay; Soham's friend
- Sahil Parab as Boy Bal; Soham's servant
- Mahesh Kokate as Kamlakar Katekor
- Rajesh Bhosale as Mangesh
- Pournima Dey-Demana as Twinkle
- Sakshi Gandhi as Pritali

== Sequel ==
A sequel titled Aggabai Sunbai was launched on 15 March 2021. Actors Girish Oak, Mohan Joshi and Nivedita Saraf played their respective roles of Abhijeet, Aajoba and Asavari. However, actors Ashutosh Patki and Tejashri Pradhan were replaced by actors Adwait Dadarkar and Uma Pendharkar for the roles of Soham and Shubhra.

== Adaptations ==
Language	Title	Original release	Network(s)	Last aired	Notes
Marathi	Aggabai Sasubai अग्गंबाई सासूबाई	22 July 2019	Zee Marathi	13 March 2021	Original
Malayalam	Manam Pole Mangalyam മനംപോലെ മംഗല്യം	28 December 2020	Zee Keralam	2 January 2022	Remake
Tamil	Pudhu Pudhu Arthangal புதுப்புது அர்த்தங்கள்	22 March 2021	Zee Tamil	20 November 2022	Remake
Punjabi	Sasse Ni Sasse Tu Khushiyan Ch Vasse ਸੱਸੇ ਨੀ ਸੱਸੇ ਤੂੰ ਖੁਸ਼ੀਆਂ ਚ ਵੱਸੇ	25 April 2022	Zee Punjabi	23 September 2022	Remake
Kannada	Shreerastu Shubhamastu ಶ್ರೀರಸ್ತು ಶುಭಮಸ್ತು	31 October 2022	Zee Kannada	31 August 2025	Remake

== Reception ==
=== Special episode ===
2 hours

- 19 January 2020 (Asavari-Abhijeet's marriage)

1 hour

- 17 January 2021
- 21 February 2021

=== Ratings ===
Week	Year	BARC Viewership		Ref.
Week	Year	TRP	Rank	Ref.
Week 30	2019	4.2	5	
Week 48	2019	3.5	5	
Week 52	2019	4.7	2	
Week 53	2019	4.1	2	
Week 1	2020	3.6	3	
Week 2	2020	3.2	5	
Week 3	2020	4.3	2	
Week 4	2020	2.9	5	
Week 5	2020	3.3	3	
Week 6	2020	3.3	3	
Week 7	2020	3.5	3	
Week 8	2020	3.0	4	
Week 9	2020	2.8	3	
Week 10	2020	5.6	1	
Week 28	2020	4.2	1	
Week 37	2020	3.4	4	
Week 2	2021	3.9	4	
Week 3	2021	3.9	4	
Week 4	2021	3.9	5	

== Awards ==
Zee Marathi Utsav Natyancha Awards
Year	Category	Recipient	Role	Ref.
2019	Best Series	Sunil Bhosale	Producer	
2019	Best Family		Kulkarni family	
2019	Best Couple	Nivedita Saraf-Girish Oak	Asavari-Abhijeet	
2019	Best Title Song	Ashok Patki	Composer	
2019	Best Mother	Nivedita Saraf	Asavari	
2019	Best Mother-in-law	Nivedita Saraf	Asavari	
2019	Best Daughter-in-law	Nivedita Saraf	Asavari	
2019	Best Father-in-law	Ravi Patwardhan	Aajoba	
2019	Best Comedy Female	Bhakti Ratnaparkhi	Maddy	
2020-21	Best Mother-in-law	Nivedita Saraf	Asavari	
2020-21	Best Daughter-in-law	Tejashri Pradhan	Shubhra	
