= Aggabai Sunbai =

2021 Indian Marathi language TV series

- Genre: Soap opera Drama
- Screenplay by: Rohini Ninave
- Story by: Sukhada Ayre; Shekhar Dhavalikar; Dialogues; Pallavi Karkera; Kiran Kulkarni
- Starring: See below
- Theme music composer: Ashok Patki
- Opening theme: "Aggabai Sunbai" by Mahalakshmi Iyer
- Country of origin: India
- Original language: Marathi
- No. of episodes: 133

Production
- Producer: Sunil Bhosale
- Camera setup: Multi Camera
- Running time: 22 minutes
- Production company: Someel Creations

Original release
- Network: Zee Marathi
- Release: 15 March – 21 August 2021

Related
- Aggabai Sasubai

Aggabai Sunbai is an Indian Marathi language TV series which aired on Zee Marathi. It premiered from 15 March and ended on 21 August 2021. It starred Nivedita Saraf, Girish Oak and Uma Pendharkar in lead roles. It is a sequel series to Aggabai Sasubai.

== Plot ==
Aggabai Sunbai is quite the opposite to its prequel, Aggabai Sasubai. In this season, Asawari Raje is depicted to have transformed herself into a strong, affluent, and established businesswoman, as well as the owner of a food industry, D. B. K. Foods, named after Dattatray Bandopant Kulkarni, also known as Aajoba. Moreover, Asawari has now become a disciplined individual and follows strict principles and rules. Meanwhile, Abhijeet has closed down Abhi's Kitchen and turned into a househusband. Soham has taken up a job in D. B. K. Foods as Asawari's second in command, but secretly hates Asawari due to her strong and changed behaviour. Soham and Shubhra are now blessed with an 8-year-old son named Shubham, also known as Babdu, for whose responsibilities Shubhra has quit her job and become a housewife. Thanks to Soham's bad teachings, values, and influences to him, Shubham has grown up to be a spoilt brat and hence, misbehaves with Shubhra and takes her for granted, making her constantly feel negative, insecure, and hurt. During Shubhra's pregnancy, her parents had tragically died in a car accident, which brought Shubhra's morale and self-confidence down and hence, made her shy and oversensitive towards her family, especially Shubham. Meanwhile, Soham also loses interest in Shubhra and begins an extramarital affair with his secretary, Suzanne. Moreover, he secretly signs all the D. B. K. Foods company's deals rejected by Asawari for his own profits.

Eventually, Asawari provides an ultimatum to Shubhra to make Soham mend his ways or divorce him. Asawari foresees her own past life in Shubhra and hence decides to make Shubhra independent and strong once again as well as secure her a position in the D. B. K. Foods company. Abhijeet learns about Soham's affair with Suzanne and hence gives him a warning. Soham breaks up with Suzanne when she misbehaves with him due to some petty reason, but due to jealousy, he ends up reconciling with her and berating Shubhra. On their marriage anniversary, Shubhra learns about Soham's affair and confronts Suzanne, but she in turn misguides her about Soham. Shubhra then confronts Soham, who reveals the whole truth about having affair both-sided, but Shubhra believes Suzanne's fake truth over Soham and asks Asavari to interfere. Suzanne ditches Shubhra in front of Asavari in order to deteriorate her image. Shubhra reveals the truth to Abhijeet and seeks his help. However, Soham makes a scam and blames Maddy and later a worker. Shubhra interferes but gets insulted by Soham and Suzanne about her and Babdu's cost of living. Hence, Shubhra sets out to recreate her own identity to become independent and begin working again. Meanwhile, Anurag Gokhale, a kind-hearted man, enters Shubhra's life when she was about to commit suicide out of depression, and advises her to live a life for herself and Babdu.

Shubhra gathers courage and questions Soham about it and asks Soham to end his relationship with Suzanne and gives him an ultimatum. Soham, in fear of Asavari, fakes his breakup with Suzanne. Abhijeet learns of this and makes Shubhra aware of Soham's cheat. Shubhra decides to teach a lesson to Soham and Suzanne. Suzanne tries to gains Asavari's sympathy and confidence. On Asavari's insistence, Shubhra joins D. B. K. Company with a post equivalent to Soham. This move angers Soham and Suzanne. Suzanne tries to create a difference between Babdu and Shubhra with miserably fails. Soham gets jealous of Shubhra's friendship with Anurag and blames her character for which she retaliates and gives him a warning.

Meanwhile, Suzanne creates a fake situation and enters the Kulkarni house which angers Shubhra and Abhijeet. They both learn about Suzanne's possessive nature to get herself married with Soham. Abhijeet and Shubhra make her life troublesome by asking to do the work of housewife. Shubhra slowly starts to learn about Soham's evil deeds in the company and his black money. Shubhra asks Soham to mend his ways or else she will register a police complaint and would reveal the truth to Asavari which would lead to Soham's bankruptcy and his permanent exit from the Kulkarnis' house.

On the occasion of Vat Poornima, Soham and Suzanne's extra-marital affair gets exposed in front of Asavari. She expels the duo for cheating Shubhra. Soham also rebels and curses Asawari, Abhijeet, and Shubhra. Aajoba learns about Soham's expulsion and insists Asavari to change her decision by fasting which eventually deteriorates his health. Soham becomes agitated by Asawari's actions and forces her to transfer her part of share and ownership on his accounts in order to return to Kulkarnis' house for Aajoba's sake. Soham returns and reveals his affair to Aajoba to which he retaliates. Soham is asked to end his relationship with Suzanne and return to Shubhra, but he fakes his relationship with Shubhra in front of Aajoba to seek the wealth. Soham takes charge of the D. B. K. Foods company for his evil intention and illegal ways to earn money. However, Abhijeet and Asawari reveal that Soham has 40% of company's shares and rest 60% shares are with Abhijeet, who later transfers them into Shubhra's account, thus making her the owner D. B. K. Company.

Asavari and Abhijeet eventually succeeds in revealing Soham's true intention to Aajoba, and he kick him out of the house. Suzanne and Soham move into a rented house decide to backstab each other. Soham earlier decides not to divorce Shubhra, but eventually agrees when Asawari hands him over ₹10 crores. Shubham and Shubhra find solace in Anurag's company and both consider him as their best friend. Eventually, Anurag falls in love with Shubhra post her divorce. Suzanne frauds Soham leaving him bankrupt. Soham repents for his mistakes and tries to reconcile with Shubhra, to which Asawari strongly disagrees. On Shubhra's birthday, Anurag reveals his feelings for her and Soham reveals Asawari's deals for their divorce to Shubhra. Shubhra, shocked with both revelation, begins distances herself from Anurag. Shubhra finally realises her feelings for Anurag and requests him to stay for good. Shubhra takes charge of D. B. K. Company. Shubham dislikes Shubhra's and Anurag's marriage ideas. Hence, Anurag and Shubhra start a live-in relationship.

== Cast ==
=== Main ===
- Uma Pendharkar as Shubhra Soham Kulkarni / Shubhra Asawari Raje
- Nivedita Saraf as Asawari Prabhakar Kulkarni / Asawari Abhijeet Raje
- Girish Oak as Abhijeet Raje

=== Recurring ===
- Adwait Dadarkar as Soham Prabhakar Kulkarni
- Mohan Joshi as Dattatray Bandopant Kulkarni (Aajoba / D. B. K.)
- Anvit Hardikar as Shubham Soham Kulkarni (Babdu)
- Chinmay Udgirkar as Anurag Gokhale
- Bhakti Ratnaparakhi as Mandodari Parab (Maddy)
- Gitanjali Ganage as Suzanne
- Shubha Godbole as Leena Gokhale (Aaji)
- Raju Bawadekar as Mr. Sheth

== Production ==
=== Casting ===
The first promo of the show featuring Nivedita Saraf, Girish Oak and Uma Pendharkar was released on 22 February 2021 in which Pendharkar was introduced as the new Shubhra. The second promo was released on 1 March 2021 and third promo on 8 March 2021, in which Adwait Dadarkar was introduced as the new Soham.

=== Cancellation ===
This sequel was launched with great hope to receive higher TRP ratings just like its prequel. However, due to the change in actors for the roles of Soham and Shubhra, the rating witnessed a drip. Moreover, the sudden change in the storyline of the show added to the cause with a massive downfall in ratings in the prime time slot. Finally, on 21 August 2021, the show aired its last episode.
