= Meri Gudiya =

Indian television series

- Genre: Drama; Fantasy; Romance; Supernatural
- Created by: Anirudh Pathak, Resham Sinha
- Written by: Anirudh Pathak; Sweta Mishra(Writer Galaxy Studio); Vikas Sharma
- Directed by: Mohit Jha, N R Pachisia
- Starring: Aalisha Panwar; Jinisha Bhaduri
- Country of origin: India
- Original language: Hindi
- No. of episodes: 81

Production
- Producer: Dheeraj Dhoopar
- Cinematography: Mohan Naidu
- Production company: DD Makers Bharat Fam

Original release
- Network: Star Bharat
- Release: 16 December 2019 – 20 March 2020

Meri Gudiya was an Indian television fantasy drama series which premiered on 16 December 2019 and is telecasted on Star Bharat. A remake of the Tamil serial Neeli, which inturn is a remake of Kannada serial Neeli, aired on Star Suvarna, it starred Aalisha Panwar and Jinisha Bhadhuri. It ended on 20 March 2020 due to the Corona pandemic.

The production and broadcast of the show was indefinitely halted due to the COVID-19 pandemic lockdown in India in late March 2020. It was later announced that the show will not be brought back after the lockdown bringing the show to an abrupt ending.

== Plot ==
The story revolves around the Gujral family who lives in Shimla. Raghvendra Gujral is a successful businessman who runs his ancestral business of coffee plantations. His wife, Madhuri, is an extremely protective mother of their seven-year-old daughter, Avi. The show highlights the unconditional love of a mother for her daughter.

== Cast ==
=== Main ===
- Aalisha Panwar as Madhuri "Mads" Gujral; Raghavendra's first wife; Avi's mother; (2019-2020) (dead character)
- Jinisha Bhaduri as Avi Gujral; Raghavendra and Madhuri's daughter (2019-2020)

=== Recurring ===
- Gaurav S Bajaj as Raghavendra "Raghav" Gujral: Parvati's elder son; Shaurya's brother; Madhuri and Ratrita's husband; Avi's father (2019–2020)
- Vineet Raina as Rahu: Madhuri's enemy (2020)
- Vidisha as Ratrita "Ratri" Gujral (née Arora): Adhrika's younger sister; Raghav's second wife (2019–2020)
- Nishigandha Wad as Parvati Gujral: Raghavendra and Shaurya's mother Avi's grandmother; (2019-2020)
- Rahul Singh as Dr. Rudraksh Kaushal (2019–2020)
- Samvedna Suwalka as Piya: Raghav's secretary; (2020)
- Sagar Parekh as Shaurya Gujral: Parvati's younger son; Raghavendra's brother (2019-2020)
- Jasmeet Kaur as Adhrika Arora: Ratrita's elder sister (2019–2020)
- Surendra Pal as Rajendra "Guruji" Sherawat (2020)

== Production ==
The first promo of the series was released on 13 November 2019 where Aalisha Panwar and Child actress Jinisha Bhaduri were introduced.

Talking about the series, Star Bharat spokesperson said, "With the launch of Meri Gudiya, we want our audiences to witness the undying affection and concern of a mother for her daughter."

Anirudh Pathak, the show's producer, said, "Audience has seen many shows on the mother-daughter bond but the unique concept of the show ‘Meri Gudiya’ revolves around a doll depicting the role of a mother. It's a show that will portray the eternal bond a mother shares with her child even after her death."

== Broadcast ==
This show was premiered on 16 December 2019.The shooting of the show was halted due to COVID-19 pandemic lockdown in India in late March. It was later announced that the show will be not brought be back, bringing the show to an abrupt ending.
