= Agni Natchathiram (TV series) =

Indian Tamil-language soap opera

- Genre: Soap opera
- Written by: Shakthi Jegan (Dialogues)
- Screenplay by: S. Kumaresan
- Directed by: A.P Rajendhiran (1–67); M.K.Arunthavaraja (68–140); P.C Raghu (141–196); R.Karthikeyan (episodes 197–235); Arulrai (episodes 236–414)
- Creative directors: P.R. Ravikumar (1–43); Dhanpal Ravi Kumar (44–140); V. Solairaja (141–414)
- Starring: Varshini Arza; Gayathri Raj; Vasanth Vasi
- Theme music composer: Hari
- Opening theme: "Azhagana Nadhiyil"; Sri Nisha (Singer); Kiruthiya (Lyrics)
- Country of origin: India
- Original language: Tamil
- No. of seasons: 1
- No. of episodes: 414

Production
- Executive producer: P. Divya Priya
- Producers: Team Vision (141–414); P. Ravikumar (68–140); P. V. Prasad (1–67)
- Production location: Chennai
- Cinematography: S.Mohan
- Editor: Christopher
- Running time: approx. 23–25 minutes
- Production companies: Sun Entertainment (1–present); Ravi Prasad Productions (1–140); Team Vision (141–414)

Original release
- Network: Sun TV
- Release: 27 May 2019 – 3 April 2021

Agni Natchathiram is an Indian Tamil-language television series starring Varshini Arza, Mersheena Neenu, Gayathri Raj and Vasanth Vasi. It premiered on Sun TV from 27 May 2019 and ended on 3 April 2021 with 414 episodes.

== Plot ==
Two girls, Akila and Meera, are polar opposites. Their fathers are friends and also master and driver to one another. Akila is the master's daughter and Meer, the driver's. Unknown to them, they are actually twins of the latter. They are caught in a love triangle with Shridhar. The plot is slightly inspired from the 1988 film of the same name. In that film, two men (who are polar opposites) were unknown that they are half-brothers. In this TV series, their gender were reversed.

== Cast ==
=== Main ===
- Varshini Arza as Meera Shridar: Selvam's first daughter, Shridhar's wife
- Mersheena Neenu (2019–2020) as Akhila
  - Gayathri Raj (2020–2021) as Akhila Surya: Selvam's second daughter, Meera's younger sister, Surya's second wife
- Vasanth Vasi as Shridhar: Meera and Akila's love interest, later Meera's husband

=== Supporting ===
- Raj Kumar Manoharan as Surya: Shridhar's elder brother, Revathi and Akhila 's husband
- Mounika/Keerthana as Jayanthi, Selvam's wife
- Rishi Keshav as Selvam: Meera and Akila's father
- Vinodhini / Pramodini Pammi / Shilpa Mary Teresa / Gayathri Priya as Nalini Chandrashekar: Selvam's sister, Akila's foster mother
- Bharath Kalyan as Chandrashekar: Selvam's best friend, Akila's foster father
- Sri Vidhya Shankar and Dharini as Mythili: Shridhar's mother
- Murali as Karthikeyan: Surya and Shridhar's father
- Anuradha as Gangadevi: Ayyadurai's mother and Ranjith's grandmother
- Maanas Chavali as Ranjith: Ayyadurai's son
- Baboos as Ayyadurai
- Shanthi Anandaraj as Shanthi
- Naveendhar as Naveen: Shridhar's friend
- Vasavi as Chinnamani
- Uma Rani as Kanchana: Karthikeyan's cousin sister and Shridhar's aunt
- Shabnam as Revathi: Surya's first wife
- Swetha Senthilkumar as Indhu

=== Special appearance ===
- Kasthuri Shankar as ACP Rudra (2020)

== Production ==
=== Casting ===
Newcomer actress Varshini Arza was cast as the female lead Meera. Newcomer actress Mersheena Neenu was cast as Akhila. However she left the series in late July 2020 due to the COVID-19 pandemic and was replaced by Gayathri Raj. Vasanth Vasi was cast as the male lead, Shridhar. Mounika, who was well known for her acting in old-school movies as well as serials, was cast as Jayanthi. However she left the series and was replaced by Keerthana.

In late November 2020, Kasthuri Shankar, known for his acting in Tamil films, was cast as ACP Rudra in a special appearance.
