= Radhamma Kuthuru =

2019 Indian Telugu language TV series

- Genre: Drama
- Written by: Dialogues: Ravi Venkat
- Story by: K Usharani
- Directed by: Bhargav Shakamuri
- Starring: Deepthi Manne; Gokul Menon; Meghana Raami
- Country of origin: India
- Original language: Telugu
- No. of episodes: 1477

Production
- Producers: GR Krishna; G Anuhya Reddy
- Editor: Chandramouli Miryala
- Camera setup: Multi-camera
- Running time: 22 minutes

Original release
- Network: Zee Telugu
- Release: 26 August 2019 – 3 August 2024

Radhamma Kuthuru (transl. Radhamma's Daughter) is an Indian Telugu language television series aired on Zee Telugu which premiered from 26 August 2019 to 3 August 2024. It stars Deepthi Manne, Gokul Menon and Meghana Raami in lead roles.

== Plot ==
Radhamma gives birth of three daughters named Archana, Akshara and Aparna. Radhamma's husband Gopal, who desperately wanted a son, decides to marry Menaka. Akshara vows to become an IAS officer to avenge her mother. Akshara marries Aravind, who is the son of Bujjamma. Akshara faces many hurdles and finally becomes an IAS officer. Meanwhile, she separated from Aravind.

== Cast ==
=== Main ===
- Deepthi Manne as Akshara Aravind IAS; Radhamma, Gopal's second daughter; Aravind's wife; Bujjamma's daughter in law; Chinni and Bujji's mother (2019–2024)
  - Baby Netra Reddy as Young Akshara
- Gokul Menon as Aravind; Bujjamma's son; Akshara's husband Radhamma's son-in-law; Chinni and Bujji's biological father (2019–2024)
- Meghana Raami as Radhamma; Archana, Akshara and Aparna's mother; Gopal's first wife. (2019–2024)
- Sowmyalatha as Bejawada Bujjamma; Matriarch of Aravind's family, Aravind's mother, Akshara's mother-in-law; Chinni and Bujji's grandmother (2019–2024)

=== Recurring ===
- Mahi Maheshwari as Corporator Shruthi; Sarala's daughter; Aravind's sister in law and love interest (2019–2024)
- Chatrapathi Sekhar as Gopala Krishna; Radhamma and Menaka's husband; Archana, Akshara and Aparna's father (2019–2024)
- Baby Nandhitha as Bujji; Akshara and Aravind's daughter (2021–2024)
- Baby Sriyanshi Nandana as Chinni; Akshara and Aravind's daughter; Aparna and Rajesh's adoptive daughter (2021–2024)
- Sandra Jayachandran as Purandhari; Bujjamma's daughter; Aravind's elder sister (2019–2024)
- Bommireddy Venkat as Rajesh; Bujjamma's son; Chinni's adoptive father (2020–2024)
- Sri Lalitha as Archana; Radhamma's elder daughter (2019–2022)
- Anchor Bhargav as Raghavendra; Purandhari's husband; Bujjamma's son-in-law (2019–2024)
- Vijay Bhargav as Madhav; Archana's husband (2019–2024)
- Shobha Rani as Bebamma; Bujjamma's sister-in-law, Akshara's younger mother-in-law (2019–2024)
- Vanitha as Sarala; Raghavendra's mother, Purandhari's mother-in-law (2019–present)
- Anu Manasa as Menaka; Gopal's illegitimate wife; Seshu's sister; Subbu's mother; Sushmita's mother-in-law (2019–2024)
- Surya Kiran as Seshu; Akshara's ex-fiancé (2019–2024)
- Sri Lakshmi Reddy as Aparna; Radhamma's youngest daughter; Rajesh's wife; Chinni's adoptive mother (2019–2023) Siri Vennela as Aparna (2023–2024)
- Kiranmai Prajapath as Varsha
- Koti as Hari; polluted police officer
- Kasinadh as Bujjamma's husband
- Duggi Abhi as Aravind's friend Durga
- Hritesh Awasty as Ramrao

=== Cameo appearance ===
- Sree Vishnu as himself (appeared for Raja Raja Chora movie promotions)
- Renu Desai as Goddess Parvathi
- Prajwal PD as Lord Shiva
- Raasi as Durgamma
- Chandana Shetty as Varudhini (reprised her role from a former TV series "Varudhini Parinayam")

== Production ==
=== Soundtrack ===
All tracks are written by Sagar Narayana.

| No. | Title | Lyrics | Music | Singer(s) | Length |
|---|---|---|---|---|---|
| 1. | "Radhamma Kuthuru Title song" | Sagar Narayana | Meenakshi Bhujang | L. V. Revanth | 4:36 |
| 2. | "Unnattundi" | Sagar Narayana | Meenakshi Bhujang | L. V. Revanth | 2:00 |
| Total length: | | | | | 6:36 |

=== Reception ===
| Week | Year | BARC Viewership | | Ref. |
| Week | Year | TRP | Rank | Ref. |
|---|---|---|---|---|
| Week 50 | 2020 | 6.9 | 5 | |
| Week 51 | 2020 | 7.0 | 5 | |
| Week 52 | 2020 | 7.1 | 4 | |

== Adaptations ==
| Language | Title | Original release | Network(s) | Last aired | Notes |
|---|---|---|---|---|---|
| Telugu | Radhamma Kuthuru రాధమ్మ కూతూరు | 26 August 2019 | Zee Telugu | 3 August 2024 | Original |
| Kannada | Puttakkana Makkalu ಪುಟ್ಟಕ್ಕನ ಮಕ್ಕಳು | 13 December 2021 | Zee Kannada | 5 March 2026 | Remake |
| Bengali | Uron Tubri উড়ন তুবড়ি | 28 March 2022 | Zee Bangla | 16 December 2022 | Remake |
| Malayalam | Kudumbashree Sharada കുടുംബശ്രീ ശാരദ | 11 April 2022 | Zee Keralam | 16 October 2026 | Remake |
| Punjabi | Dheeyan Meriyaan ਧੀਆਂ ਮੇਰੀਆਂ | 6 June 2022 | Zee Punjabi | 30 March 2024 | Remake |
| Tamil | Meenakshi Ponnunga மீனாட்சி பொண்ணுங்க | 1 August 2022 | Zee Tamil | 4 August 2024 | Remake |
| Hindi | Main Hoon Aparajita मैं हूं अपराजिता | 27 September 2022 | Zee TV | 25 June 2023 | Remake |
| Marathi | Lavangi Mirchi लवंगी मिरची | 13 February 2023 | Zee Marathi | 5 August 2023 | Remake |
| Hindi | Ganga Mai Ki Betiyan गंगा माई की बेटियाँ | 22 September 2025 | Zee TV | Ongoing | Remake |
