= Bring Your Own Film Festival =

Film festival in Puri, India

Coordinates: 19.795208°N 85.826805°E

The Bring Your Own Film Festival (BYOFF) is a film festival that began in 2004 on the beaches of the temple town Puri, in the Indian state of Odisha.

Its uniqueness lies in the fact that there is no formal screening or qualifying process, but it is a forum for independent filmmakers. Anyone can walk-in, register, and exhibit his or her work. The festival has proven to be popular and has generated considerable interest in the Indian film-making community. Here, any filmmaker can bring their works to the festival and screen it. Not only filmmakers, but also artists from other fields like music, theatre, painting, sculpture, dance, literature and photography are encouraged to participate and show their work.

This film festival was founded by Susant Misra and his friends from the Film and Television Institute (FTII) that include Gurpal Singh, late Swagat Sen and others. There is no hierarchy, no completion, no juries and no awards.

The film entries have to pay a nominal registration fee that is ₹5,000 and a screening fee.

The film is held from February 21 to 25 every year.
