= Vilayati Bhabhi =

Indian Punjabi television series

- Genre: Comedy-drama
- Story by: Damini Shetty
- Directed by: Sahil Kohli
- Starring: Isha Gupta; Kanwarpreet Singh
- Country of origin: India
- Original language: Punjabi
- No. of episodes: 190

Production
- Editors: Ashish Pradhan; Rajkumar Gupta
- Camera setup: Multi-camera
- Running time: 22 minutes
- Production company: Eternal Frame Productions

Original release
- Network: Zee Punjabi
- Release: 13 January 2020 – 15 January 2021

Related
- Lagnachi Wife Weddingchi Bayku

Vilayati Bhabhi (transl. Foreigner Sister in Law) is an Indian Punjabi language television series that premiered from 13 January 2020 on Zee Punjabi. It stars Isha Gupta and Kanwarpreet Singh. It is an official remake of Zee Marathi's TV series Lagnachi Wife Weddingchi Bayku. It ended on 15 January 2021.

== Plot ==
Sandy and Emily both live in Canada. Sandy as an NRI man marries Emily, who lives in Canada as well. Sandy is a loafer. He returns to his village Punjab with her wife. When Sandy returned to his village and spend few months in Punjab India. The villager want him to return to Canada with his wife and think that why he had gone to Canada for his desire and aim.

== Cast ==
- Isha Gupta as Emily
- Kanwarpreet Singh as Sukhwinder "Sandy" Singh
- Sushma Prashant
- Mandeep Mani
- Guru Sevak
- Damini Shetty
- Charanpreet Maan

== Adaptations ==
Language	Title	Original release	Network(s)	Last aired	Notes
Marathi	Lagnachi Wife Weddingchi Bayku लग्नाची वाईफ वेडिंगची बायकू	21 October 2019	Zee Marathi	3 April 2020	Original
Punjabi	Vilayati Bhabhi ਵਿਲਾਇਤੀ ਭਾਭੀ	13 January 2020	Zee Punjabi	15 January 2021	Remake
