= Rishton Ka Saudagar – Baazigar =

2016 Indian Hindi television series

- Also known as: Ek Chutki Sindoor
- Genre: Drama
- Created by: Dhaval Gada; Guroudev Bhalla
- Written by: Dhaval Gada; Gurudev Bhalla
- Starring: Vatsal Sheth; Ishita Dutta; Aalisha Panwar
- Country of origin: India
- Original language: Hindi
- No. of seasons: 1
- No. of episodes: 70

Production
- Producers: Dhaval Gada; Gurudev Bhalla
- Production locations: Mumbai, India
- Camera setup: Multi-camera
- Running time: 22 minutes

Original release
- Network: Life OK
- Release: 20 June – 23 September 2016

Rishton Ka Saudagar – Baazigar (transl. Gambler: The Merchant of Relationships) is an Indian Hindi drama television series of Life OK which premiered on 20 June 2016 and ended on 23 September 2016 owing to lower viewership. Produced by Dhaval Gada and Gurudev Bhalla, it starred Vatsal Sheth, Ishita Dutta. and Aalisha Panwar,

== Plot ==
The story revolves around Aarav and Arundati, who are shown to be very much in love at the start of the show. Aarav seizes every opportunity to surprise Arundhati and make her happy. Soon their wedding preparations begin but on the wedding day, it is revealed that Aarav hates Arundati and was marrying her just to take revenge as Arundhati slapped him in the past. Aarav leaves the mandap leaving everyone shocked. Arundati who's still in a trauma turns out to be pregnant with Aarav's child but later suffers a miscarriage. She decides to take revenge and gain back her lost respect and forcefully enters Aarav's house as his wife and starts living with him. Aarav plots against Arundati in order to kick her out of his house but fails every time. Aarav meanwhile murders his own father. Soon it is revealed that Aarav also killed his mother by poisoning her because she was unhappy with his father and they constantly fought and Aarav wanted to ease her sufferings. Arundati soon realizes that Aarav has some hidden bitter past which greatly affects his present actions and that past is linked to the happenings of his 9th birthday party. She arranges a birthday party similar to that of Aarav's 9th birthday and during the party a wooden door falls on Aarav and he suffers from a trauma which leads to his mind turning to that of a 9 year old. Arundati cares for him while all the other family members doubt her intentions. She finds out that on his 9th birthday Aarav saw his father with his Masi (now his step mom), also he was raped by the house servant. Aarav's dadi and Arundati contact a doctor over Aarav's condition and the doctor asks them to bring the same servant in front of Aarav in order to reverse his trauma. On the other hand it is revealed that Aarav's step mom is plotting to kill both Aarav and Arundati in order to gain hold of the entire property. Aarav regain his memory and decides to trap his step's mom and have her arrested with the help of Arundati. Finally, Aarav and Arundati have a happy reunion.

== Cast ==
=== Main ===
- Vatsal Sheth as Aarav Trivedi: Kailashnath and Parul's elder sister's son and murderer, Parul's nephew and step-son, Arundhati's husband
- Ishita Dutta as Arundhati Trivedi: Ashwin's daughter, Aarav's wife
- Aalisha Panwar as Kritika

=== Recurring ===
- Lalit Parimoo as Ashwin Bhardwaj: Arundhati's father
- Shital Thakkar as Parul Kailashnath Trivedi: Aarav's mother younger sister, Kailashnath second-wife and widow, Aarav's aunt and step-mother
- Pankaj Dheer as Kailashnath Trivedi: Padmini's brother, Parul's elder sister widower, Parul's husband, Aarav's father and uncle
- Shresth Kumar
- Debashish Naha
- Piyali Munshi
- Ekta Mukherjee
- Pyumori Mehta
- Jhuma Biswas
- Kapil Arya as Siddhant, Arundhati’s best friend
- Sumukhi Pendse as Padmini Trivedi: Kailashnath's sister, Radheshyam's wife, Rishi's mother
- Rudra Kaushish as Radheyshyam: Padamini's husband, Rishi's father
- Tarun Mahilani: as Rishi: Radheshyam and Padmini's son, Aarav's cousin
