= Main Hoon Aparajita =

2022 Indian Hindi TV series

- Genre: Drama
- Written by: Giselle Galbao; Prakriti Mukherjee; Gitansghu Dey; Anju Kapoor
- Directed by: Vikram Ghai
- Starring: Shweta Tiwari; Manav Gohil
- Country of origin: India
- Original language: Hindi
- No. of episodes: 266

Production
- Executive producer: Prabhjyot Gujral
- Producers: Sukesh Motwani; Mautik Tolia
- Running time: 22 minutes
- Production company: Bodhi Tree Multimedia Pvt. Ltd.

Original release
- Network: Zee TV
- Release: 27 September 2022 – 25 June 2023

Related
- Radhamma Kuthuru

Main Hoon Aparajita (transl. I am undefeatable) is an Indian Hindi-language drama television series that premiered from 27 September 2022 on Zee TV. It is produced by Sukesh Motwani under Bodhi Tree Multimedia and it is an official remake of Radhamma Kuthuru. It starred Shweta Tiwari and Manav Gohil. The show ended on 25 June 2023. It was replaced by Pyar Ka Pehla Adhyaya: Shiv Shakti in its timeslot.

== Premise ==
Aparajita is deserted by her husband, Akshay, who left her alone to fend for herself and her three daughters. But she rises to meet every challenge so that her daughters can be strong and independent.

== Cast ==
=== Main ===
- Shweta Tiwari as Aparajita Singh: Akshay's first wife (2022–2023)
- Manav Gohil as Akshay Singh: Kusumlata's son (2022–2023)
- Shweta Gulati as Mohini Singh: Manish's sister (2022–2023)

=== Recurring ===
- Anushka Merchande as Chhavi Singh: Aparajita and Akshay's eldest daughter (2022–2023)
  - Princy Prajapati as Child Chhavi Singh (2022)
- Dhwani Gori as Disha Singh Kapoor: Aparajita and Akshay's second daughter (2022–2023)
  - Sayesha Shah as Child Disha Singh (2022)
- Shruti Choudhary as Asha "Ashu" Singh: Aparajita and Akshay's youngest daughter (2022–2023)
- Garvita Sadhwani as Niya Singh: Mohini and Akshay's daughter (2022–2023)
- Akshaan Sehrawat as Shubham "Shubh" Singh: Akshay and Mohini's son (2023)
- Amita Khopkar as Kusumlata Singh: Akshay and Kalpana's mother (2022–2023)
- Smita Singh as Kalpana Singh: Kusumlata's daughter (2023)
- Varun Kasturia as Arjun Kapoor: Ashmit's son (2023)
- Saptrishi Ghosh as Ashmit Kapoor: Arjun's father (2023)
- Shubhkaran as Veer Thakur: Sunil's son; Chhavi's ex-fiancé (2022–2023)
- Nishikant Dixit as Sunil Thakur: A corrupt politician; Veer's father (2022–2023)
- Puneet Tejwani as Manish: Mohini's brother (2022–2023)
- Ankit Rana as Vicky: Veer's friend (2022)
- Imran Nazir Khan as A.C.P. Kabir Chauhan: Chhavi's love interest (2023)
- Rajesh Dubey as Guruji (2023)
- Ekta Sharma as Inspector Devi (2023)
- Abby Rehman as Gufran: Aparajita's laundry employee (2022–2023)

== Production ==
=== Casting ===
Shweta Tiwari was cast in the title role of Aparajita. Manav Gohil was cast as Akshay opposite Tiwari. This mark their second collaboration nearly 20 years after Kasautii Zindagii Kay.

Anushka Merchande, Dhwani Gori, Shruti Choudhary and Garvita Sadhwani were cast in the role of Tiwari's three daughters and one stepdaughter. Shweta Gulati cast as the negative lead, Mohini opposite Gohil.

=== Release ===
The first promo was released on 1 September 2022. The series premiered on 27 September 2022 on Zee TV.

=== Reception ===
The Times of India stated, "Main Hoon Aparajita is quite a run-of-the-mill saga. There are unrealistic situations created to mount the drama. However, Shweta Tiwari manages to hold the show and shines in it."

Pinkvilla mentioned, "Playing a mother comes naturally to Shweta Tiwari and there's solid conviction. Manav Gohil's portrayal of a male chauvinist character will make you hate him for acting so well."
