= Kudumbashree Sharada =

2022 Indian Malayalam language TV series

- Genre: Drama
- Written by: Kishore Abraham
- Story by: K. Usharani
- Directed by: S Janardhanan, Krishnakumar Kudallur
- Starring: Sreelakshmi; Mersheena Neenu; Prabhin; Sachin
- Country of origin: India
- Original language: Malayalam
- No. of episodes: 1634

Production
- Producer: Bhoomichitra
- Cinematography: Vishnu Nair
- Editor: M Sivashankar
- Camera setup: Multi-camera
- Running time: 22 minutes

Original release
- Network: Zee Keralam
- Release: 11 April 2022 – 16 October 2026

Related
- Radhamma Kuthuru

Kudumbashree Sharada is an Indian Malayalam language drama television series aired on Zee Keralam from 11 April 2022 to 16 October 2026. It stars Sreelakshmi, Mersheena Neenu and Prabhin in lead roles. The show is a remake of Telugu series Radhamma Kuthuru, which aired on Zee Telugu. It is one of the longest-running soap opera in Malayalam.

== Plot ==
Sharada gives birth of three daughters named Sharika, Shalini and Shyama. sharada's husband Gopal, who desperately wanted a son, decides to marry Rajeshwari and leaves Sharada and three daughters. Shalini vows to become an IAS officer to avenge her mother. She marries Vishnu, a local goon who is the son of Sathyabhama, a wealthy money lender. Sathyamma and her niece Sushmita tries to separate vishnu and Shalini. Sharika married her professor while Shyama maaried Rohit. The story portrays Sharadamma's struggle to safeguard her Shalini's life. Shalini gives birth of twin daughters. Shalini became IAS. New Avatar Shivan comes as a local goon like Vishnu; Shivan had undergone a critical heart transplant operation earlier in the series. Meanwhile, Vishnu passed away under tragic circumstances. The emotional peak of the storyline centers around the characters Sathyabhama and Shalini discovering the shocking truth that the heart beating inside Shivan is actually Vishnu's. This revelation coincides with intense dramatic events, including threats to Shivan's life.

== Cast ==
=== Main ===
- Mersheena Neenu as Shalini Vishnu IAS; Sharadamma's second daughter; Vishnu's wife; Pappi and Bhama's mother (2022-2026)
- Sachin SG as Shivan; Mahendran's Son (2025-2026)
- Prabhin as Vishnu; Sathyabhama, Raghavan's elder son; Shalini's husband; Sharadamma's son-in-law (2022-2026)
- Sreelakshmi as Sharadamma; Sarika, Shalini and Shyama's mother; Gopalakrishnan's wife (2022-2026)
- Poornima Anand as Sathyabhama; Raghavan's wife; Vishnu and Preethi's mother; Rohit's adoptive mother; Shalini's and Shyama's mother-in-law (2022-2026)

=== Recurring ===
- Baby Rukku as Pappi (Padmini); Shalini and Vishnu's daughter; Shyama and Rohit's adoptive daughter; Sathyabhama's sister (2024-2026)
- Baby Anna Elsa as Sathyabhama; Shalini and Vishnu's daughter; Pappi's sister (2024-2026)
- Saji Nair as Raghavan; Sathyabhama's husband; Vishnu and Preethi's father; Rohit's adoptive father (2022-2026)
- Subhash Menon as Mahendran; Shivan's and Chandra's father; (2025-2026)
- Nihas Khan as Rohit; Padmavathi's son; Sushmita's ex-husband; Sathyabhama's adoptive son; Shyama's husband (2023-2026)
- Sreelakshmi as Shyama; Sharadamma's younger daughter; Rohit's Second Wife (2022-2026)
- Parvathy as Daisy; Shivan's Love Interest; Yohanan's Daughter; Antony's Sister (2025-2026)
- Prajusha as Nirmala; Shivan's mother; Mahendran's wife (2025-2026)
- Devika Pillai/Athira Savithri as Sharika Rajeevan; Sharadamma's elder daughter; Rajeev's wife (2022-2024) (2025-2026)
- Pavithran as Gopalakrishnan; Sharadamma's husband; Sarika, Shalini and Shyama's father (2022-2026)
- Rajaji Rajagopal as Kurupp Sir (2022-2026)
- Munshi Ayyappan as Pillai; Raghavan's manager (2022-2026)
- Joby A S as Swami; (2025-2026)
- Prashobha P as Ponni; Sathyabhama's maid (2022-2026)
- Akhil Swaminathan as Kamalan; Vishnu's close friend (2022-2026)
- Deepthi Dev as Chandra; Mahendran's daughter; Shivan's sister (2025-2026)
- Keerthi Gopinath as Antony Yohanan; Daisy's Brother; Shivan's Enemy (2025-2026)
- Ak Akanand as Yohanan; Antony and Daisy's Father; Mahendran's Enemy (2025-2026)
- Athira G Chandran as Anu Pallavi; Shalini's P.A (2024-2026)
- Sridevika as Sreerenjini IPS; Sarika, Shalini and Shyama's nephew (2022-2026)
- Kiran Viswanathan Iyer as C.I TM Razak (2025-2026)
- Nikshit RIckson as Davis; Daisy's Cousin and Fiance; (2025-2026)
- Breshnev Shyam as C.I Chandrabose; Sushmita's Uncle; (2023-2026)
- Haritha Nair as Mayor Sushmitha; Vishnu's ex-fiancé; Rohit's ex-wife; Jagdeep's wife (2022-2026)
- Surjith Purohit as Adv. Arjunan; Preethi's husband; Vasumathi's son (2022-2026)
- Aswanth Anil as Anoop ; Shalini's Step brother, Noorjahan Love Interest (2025)
- Arun Mohan as Jagdeep Kumar/ Shaji; Sushmita's Second Husband (2024-2026)
- Jeevan Gopal as Prof. Rajeev Ranganath; Sharika's husband (2022-2024)
- Kajal Girish as Preethi Arjunan; Sathyabhama's younger daughter (2022-2024)
- Krishna Thulasi Bhai as Vasumathi; Sathyabhama's cousin; Arjunan and Chithra's mother; Preethi's mother-in-law (2022-2025)
- Snisha Chandran as Reshma ; Vishnu's childhood Friend (2025-2026)
- Lekshmy Nandan as Advocate Aruna ; Shalini's Friend ; Krishnamoorthy's Husband (2026)
- Yassar as Krishnamoorthy; Aruna's Husband (2026)
- Arun MJ Mohan as Balachandran; Rajeshwari's younger brother; Shalini's ex-fiancé (2022-2025)
- Parassalavijayan Krishnapillai as Ammavan; Rajeev's uncle (2022-2026) (2025-2026)
- Beena Sunil as Vijayalakshmi; Rajeev's mother (2022-2024) (2025-2026)
- Sneha Suresh as Noorjahan; Anoop's Love Interest (2025)
- Sreeraj Vaekala as Nazir; Noorjahan's Cousin (2025)
- Priyanka Sreelakshmi as Santha (2022-2026)
- Navya as Karthika; (2024-2025)
- Ameys Nair as Madhusri; Vishnu's fiancé, Shalini's batchmate and Enemy; Sushmitha's friend (2024-2025)
- Niveditha S Menon as Sarila; Sushmita's mother (2022-2024)
- Aparna as Jayashree; Kamalan's love interest (2025)
- Vishnu Mohan as Devan; Shalini's friend (2024)
- Rebecca Santhosh as Collector Thejaswini; Shalini's friend (2024)
- Sreekutty as Chithra; Vasumathi's daughter (2022-2024)
- Amrutha Varnan as Rajeshwari; Gopalakrishnan's illegitimate ex-wife; Balachandran's sister; Died (2022-2024)
- Lissy Babu as Padmavathi; Rohit's mother (2023-2024)
- Rudra S Lal as Hemalatha (2023)
- Binu Dev as Adv. Ameer Abdulla (2024-2025)
- Athira Praveen as Yamini; Rajeev's fiancé (2023-2024)
- Jinto as Sahadevan; Polluted Police Officer (2022-2023)
- James as Pathrosachayan (2023-2024)
- Aadi Laxmi Lachu as Vijila; Kamalan's sister (2023-2024)
- Vivek Gopan as Dr. Abdul Kader (2023-2024)
- Noobin Johny as Williams; Vishnu's friend (2023-2024)
- Bhasker Aravind as Dasan; Vishnu's close friend (2022-2023)
- Manikanthan as Cleetus; Photographer (2022-2024) (2026)
- Jaisappan Mathai as Anthappan (2024)
- Ramachandran as Home Minister Shanmukan (2024-2025)

Mahasangamam episodes

- Megha Mahesh as Ammu
- Salmananul Faris as Sanju
- Vaishnavi as Swathi
- Aswin Puthiyaveetil as Narendran

Thampi

- Kishore as Drama Juniors mentor
- Shiju Abdul Rasheed as Ravichandran
- Jai Dhanush as Meghanadhan
- Snisha Chandran as Anjali
- Vishnu Mohan as Krishna Prasad
- Manikanthan as Manichan; Cleetus's twin brother
