= Zee Punjabi =

Indian-Punjabi TV channel

- Logo used since 2025
- Country: India
- Headquarters: Chandigarh, Punjab, India

Programming
- Language: Punjabi
- Picture format: 576p SDTV

Ownership
- Owner: Zee Entertainment Enterprises
- Sister channels: List of channels owned by ZEEL

History
- Launched: 13 January 2020; 6 years ago
- Replaced: Alpha TV Punjabi

Zee Punjabi also known as Z Punjabi is an Indian general entertainment pay television channel and satellite television channel from Punjab, India. This channel is a part of Zee Entertainment Enterprises. It is of Punjabi language.

== History ==
The channel was originally started in 1999 as Alpha TV Punjabi, but was later shut down. The first incarnation launched in the UK in 2002 and shut down on 30 April 2009 in the UK and 31 May 2009 due to unfeasibility. In the UK's case, all of the programming was sourced from India with no local output. After many years of closure, this TV channel was re-launched on 13 January 2020 with new programs.

== Former broadcast ==
=== Drama series ===
| Premiere date | Series | Last aired | Adaptation of |
|---|---|---|---|
| 13 January 2020 | Khasma Nu Khani | 3 June 2022 | Marathi TV series Majhya Navaryachi Bayko |
| 13 January 2020 | Kamli Ishq Di | 11 June 2021 | Marathi TV series Lagira Zala Ji |
| 13 January 2020 | Vilayati Bhabhi | 15 January 2021 | Marathi TV series Lagnachi Wife Weddingchi Bayku |
| 22 March 2021 | Akhiyan Udeek Diyan | 27 August 2021 | Marathi TV series Tula Pahate Re |
| 14 June 2021 | Chhoti Jathani | 11 November 2022 | Marathi TV series Tujhyat Jeev Rangala |
| 30 August 2021 | Geet Dholi | 2 February 2024 | Bengali TV series Jamuna Dhaki |
| 22 November 2021 | Tere Dil Vich Rehan De | 22 April 2022 | Telugu TV series America Ammayi |
| 3 January 2022 | Nayan – Jo Vekhe Unvekha | 23 March 2024 | Bengali TV series Trinayani |
| 25 April 2022 | Sasse Ni Sasse Tu Khushiyan Ch Vasse | 23 September 2022 | Marathi TV series Aggabai Sasubai |
| 6 June 2022 | Dheeyan Meriyaan | 30 March 2024 | Telugu TV series Radhamma Kuthuru |
| 14 November 2022 | Dildariyan | 6 October 2023 | Telugu TV series Varudhini Parinayam |

=== Reality shows ===
| Premiere date | Show | Last aired |
|---|---|---|
| 4 September 2021 | Punjabiyan Di Dadagiri With Bhajji | 8 January 2022 |
