= Hitler Gari Pellam =

Indian Telugu language television series

- Genre: Romance
- Starring: Gomathi Priya; Nirupam Paritala
- Music by: Meenakshi bhujang Rakshith. K (background score)
- Opening theme: Na Nishidi Gadhilo
- Country of origin: India
- Original language: Telugu
- No. of episodes: 450

Production
- Executive producer: Krishnakanth
- Producer: Nirupam Paritala
- Running time: 22 minutes
- Production company: Om Entertainments

Original release
- Network: Zee Telugu
- Release: 17 August 2020 – 22 January 2022

Related
- Guddan Tumse Na Ho Payega

Hitler Gari Pellam is an Indian Telugu language television series which aired on Zee Telugu. It premiered on 17 August 2020 and stars Gomathi Priya and Nirupam Paritala. The series is an official remake of Zee TV series Guddan Tumse Na Ho Payega.

== Plot ==
The story revolves around Bhanumathi, a kind-hearted girl living in Bheemavaram, who, in order to save her step-sister's life, married a billionaire and famous cook, Abhinav Jagarlamudi (AJ). Bhanumathi lost her mother at a very young age and was brought up by her loving father and stepmother, who strongly dislikes her. In a series of flashbacks, Bhanumathi's sense of guilt for being unable to save her birth mother is revealed.

AJ had lost his first wife (Pravalika) in a traumatic accident left him withdrawn, stern and unemotional. He is a father figure for his three nephews (from his elder brother) and their respective wives. On account of his personality and their fear of him, they call him Hitler.

When Bhanumathi married Abhinav Jagarlamudi, even though Abhinav did not like her and used to get irritated by her antics, he protected her and supported her when needed. She slowly develops self-confidence, and he begins to feel emotions he does not understand. Early in their marriage, Abhinav thought that Bhanu married him for his money; later, he begins to appreciate her innocence and kindness. As a result, Bhanu slowly regained her confidence and started believing in herself. Aj also started experiencing emotions with Bhanu which he couldn't seem to name. But as they started living together, he began to realize that she is an innocent and kind-hearted girl and starts loving her with a sweet understanding between each other.

Police officer Vikram (Vicky), Pravalika's elder brother, forced Bhanu to stay with Abhinav to collect evidence that he killed Pravalika. Although Bhanu hides her knowledge about Vikram's intentions from Abhinav and the rest of the family, she defends Abhinav when Vikram arrests him. Aj learns that Bhanu was staying at his house to gather evidence against him, and is heartbroken.

Aj takes a promise from Royyala Raju (Bhanumathi's Father) that after the marriage of Aj's cousin in law - Anjali (Bhanu's step sister), he will divorce Bhanumathi. According to Aj's wish he brought a marriage proposal for Anjali and was celebrating her marriage. Bhanu found out that Abhinav will divorce her after Anjali's marriage so tried to change Abhi's opinion on Bhanu, but as Bhanu hid few important things from Abhinav, Abhi's friend's sister who came to take revenge on Abhinav and his family thinking that Abhi is responsible for her brothers death, took advantage of it and made a big scene in Anjali's Marriage that Anjali has a ex- lover Badri who is relative of Abhinav and wanted to marry him. Devayani (Abhinav's Friend's Sister) told Aj that Bhanu was the one who knew all this and didn't even utter a word. As a result, Aj gave divorce papers to Bhanu and told her to meet him in the court and sent her back to her Home. Anjali would be Husband Defended Anjali and married her to take revenge from Abhinav by tottering Anjali.

Bhanu managed to get back to Aj house with the help of her uncle. Bhanu felt that Aj was hiding something from his family so she had to spy on him to and out the truth what he has been hiding. One day Aj himself revealed that he was taking care of a mentally ill patient name Suraj and took his responsibilities. Bhanu took a lot care of Suraj which amazed Aj and melted his heart. Bhanu wondered and was eager to find out who is Suraj and that led to a long distance between Aj and Bhanu. Later one day when Aj enemy's Appalakonda and Edukondalu kidnapped Suraj to get Abhinav's entire business. Though Aj signed on the documents to give his Business to Appalakonda, Appalakonda was about to shoot Suraj but Aj came in between to save Suraj and when Appalakonda was about to shoot Aj it was shot to Bhanu who came in defend him from getting him harmed. Aj understood that Bhanu truly loves him . They shared their feelings and come to trust each other which makes them realize it was nothing but true love.

== Cast ==
=== Main ===
- Gomathi Priya as Bhanumathi Abhinav Jagarlamudi (Bhanu also nicknamed by Hitler as Bekari) (2020–2022)
  A kind-hearted and easy going girl, who married AJ and became AJ's wife, Jayamma's daughter-in-law, Dhaksha, Maya and Chitra's parental mother-in-law.
- Nirupam Paritala as Abhinav Jagarlamudi (AJ also nicknamed by people around as Hitler) (2020–2022)
  A professional cook, he always needs to be perfect. He first married Pravalika but she died. So as per Pravalika's final wish, he married Bhanu, Jayamma's son, Dhaksha, Maya and Chitra's parental father-in-law.

=== Recurring ===
- Sunandha Malasetti as Dhaksha: AJ's first parental daughter-in-law (2020–2022)
- Keerthi Jai Dhanush (2020-2021) as Maya: AJ's second parental daughter-in-law, Kavita Vaari replaced Keerthi as Maya (2021–2022)
- Madhu Krishnan as Chitra: AJ's third parental daughter-in-law (2020–2022)
- Krishnaveni as Jayapradha aka Jayamma: AJ's mother (2020–2022)
- Tonisha Kapileswarapu as Anjali: Bhanu's half-sister (2020–2022)
- Madhavi Latha as Kanyakumari: Bhanu's step-mother and Anjali's mother (2020–2022)
- Komma Naveen as Kishor: AJ's son and Maya's husband (2020–2022)
- Charan as Vardhan: AJ's son and Dhaksha's husband (2020–2022)
- Kosaraju Aditya as Raju: Bhanu and Anjali's father and Kanyakumari's husband (2020–2022)
- Venkat Chinthalapudi as Bhadri: Anjali's ex-lover and Sindhu's husband (2020–2022)
- Yamini Bandaru as Sindhu: Bhadri's wife (2020–2022)
- Prince Yawar as Vishnu: Anjali's Husband (2021–2022)
- Prabhakar as Appala Konda: AJ's Enemy & a cook (2021–2022)
- Aadhya Parachuri as Shruthi: Doctor (2021–2022)
- Bramar as Suraj (2021–2022)
- Vasudha as Nandini: Raghuram's cousin (2021–2022)
- Sridevi as Lucky: Raghuram's cousin (2021–2022)
- Ritesh as Raghuram (2021–2022)

=== Cameo appearance ===
- Manjula Paritala as Pravallika: AJ's first wife (photographic appearance)
- Krishna Baghavan as Don Bhagavan
- Shobha Shetty as Devayani: AJ's enemy
- Posani Krishna Murali as Dubai Raja (Bhanu's Uncle)

=== Hitler Pelli Gola ===
- Anusha Hegde as Surya 'Suryakantham'
- Siddu as Police Officer Adhithya
- Anushree as Meera
- Madhubala as Mrudula
- Rithvika as Shambhavi
- Amardeep Chowdary as Amar

== Adaptations ==
Language	Title	Original release	Network(s)	Last aired	Notes
Hindi	Guddan Tumse Na Ho Payega गुड्डन तुमसे ना हो पायेगा	3 September 2018	Zee TV	26 January 2021	Original
Telugu	Hitler Gari Pellam హిట్లర్ గారి పెళ్ళాం	17 August 2020	Zee Telugu	22 January 2022	Remake
Tamil	Thirumathi Hitler திருமதி ஹிட்லர்	14 December 2020	Zee Tamil	8 January 2022	Remake
Malayalam	Mrs. Hitler മിസിസ്. ഹിറ്റ്ലർ	19 April 2021	Zee Keralam	11 June 2023	Remake
Kannada	Hitler Kalyana ಹಿಟ್ಲರ್ ಕಲ್ಯಾಣ	9 August 2021	Zee Kannada	14 March 2024	Remake
Bengali	Tomar Khola Hawa তোমার খোলা হাওয়া	12 December 2022	Zee Bangla	29 July 2023	Remake
Odia	Tu Khara Mun Chhai ତୁ ଖରା ମୁଁ ଛାଇ	2 January 2023	Zee Sarthak	Ongoing	Remake
Marathi	Navri Mile Hitlerla नवरी मिळे हिटलरला	18 March 2024	Zee Marathi	25 May 2025	Remake
Punjabi	Heer Tey Tedhi Kheer ਹੀਰ ਤੈ ਟੇਢੀ ਖੀਰ	1 April 2024	Zee Punjabi	29 March 2025	Remake
