= Navri Mile Hitlerla =

2024 Indian Marathi language TV series

- Genre: Drama
- Directed by: Chandrakant Gaikwad
- Starring: Raqesh Bapat; Vallari Viraj
- Country of origin: India
- Original language: Marathi
- No. of episodes: 398

Production
- Producers: Sharmishtha Raut; Tejas Desai
- Production locations: Mumbai, Maharashtra
- Camera setup: Multi-camera
- Running time: 22 minutes
- Production company: Ericon Telefilms

Original release
- Network: Zee Marathi
- Release: 18 March 2024 – 25 May 2025

Related
- Guddan Tumse Na Ho Payega

Navri Mile Hitlerla (transl. Hitler got a wife) is an Indian Marathi language TV series which aired on Zee Marathi. It premiered from 18 March 2024 along with Punha Kartavya Aahe. It starred Raqesh Bapat and Vallari Viraj in lead roles. It is an official remake of Zee TV's Hindi series Guddan Tumse Na Ho Payega.

It is produced by Sharmishtha Raut, Tejas Desai and directed by Chandrakant Gaikwad under the banner of Ericon Telefilms. The show ended on 25 May 2025 completing 398 episodes. It was No.1 show on channel in marriage week with 2.7 TVR.

== Plot ==
When destiny unites Abhiram, a perfectionist middle-aged millionaire with Leela, a carefree young woman, she faces the unexpected challenges of being a mother-in-law to his three daughters-in-law.

== Cast ==
=== Main ===
- Raqesh Bapat as Abhiram (AJ) Jahagirdar
- Vallari Viraj as Leela Vasant Mohite / Leela Abhiram Jahagirdar

=== Recurring ===
Jahagirdar family

- Sharmila Shinde as Durga Kishor Jahagirdar
- Sanika Kashikar as Laxmi Pramod Jahagirdar
- Bhumija Patil as Saraswati Viraj Jahagirdar
- Bharati Patil as Sarojini Jahagirdar
- Madhuri Bharati as Antara Abhiram Jahagirdar
- Prasad Limaye as Kishor Jahagirdar
- Milind Shirole as Pramod Jahagirdar
- Raj More as Viraj Jahagirdar

Mohite family

- Sheetal Kshirsagar as Kalindi Vasant Mohite
- Uday Salvi as Vasant Mohite
- Aalapini Nisal as Revati Vasant Mohite

Others

- Advait Kadne as Vikrant Deshmukh
- Sandhya Manik as Pooja Vikrant Deshmukh
- Deepak Kadam as Suresh Salunkhe
- Dhanashri Bhalekar as Falguni
- Ajinkya Date as Vishwaroop
- Akshata Apte as Shweta
- Ruchir Gurav as Yash
- Neha Bam as Shweta's mother

=== Guest appearances ===
- Sonalee Kulkarni
- Rohit Parshuram as Arjun Kadam from Appi Aamchi Collector
- Shivani Naik as Aparna Mane from Appi Aamchi Collector
- Prasad Jawade as Aditya Kirloskar from Paaru
- Sharayu Sonawane as Parvati Semse from Paaru
- Hrishikesh Shelar as Adhipati Suryavanshi from Tula Shikvin Changlach Dhada
- Shivani Rangole as Akshara Suryavanshi from Tula Shikvin Changlach Dhada
- Purva Phadke as Shivani Patil from Shiva
- Akshaya Hindalkar as Vasundhara Ranade from Punha Kartavya Aahe
- Harshada Khanvilkar as Lakshmi Dalvi from Lakshmi Niwas
- Mahima Mhatre as Meera Gurav from Tula Japnar Aahe

== Awards ==
Zee Marathi Utsav Natyancha Awards 2024
Category	Recipient	Role	Ref.
Best Supporting Female	Sharmila Shinde	Durga Jahagirdar	
Best Couple	Raqesh Bapat-Vallari Viraj	AJ-Leela	
Best Daughter-in-law	Vallari Viraj	Leela Jahagirdar	
Best Mother-in-law	Vallari Viraj	Leela Jahagirdar	
Popular Family		Jahagirdar Family	
Best Series	Sharmishtha Raut	Producer	
Popular Actor	Raqesh Bapat	Abhiram Jahagirdar	
Best Son-in-law	Raqesh Bapat	Abhiram Jahagirdar	

== Reception ==
=== Special episode (1 hour) ===
- 6 April 2025
- 27 April 2025
- 25 May 2025

=== Airing history ===
No.	Airing Date	Days	Time (IST)	Ref.
1	18 March 2024 – 14 March 2025	Daily	10 pm	
2	17 March – 25 May 2025	Mon-Sat	11 pm	

== Adaptations ==
Language	Title	Original release	Network(s)	Last aired	Notes	Ref.
Hindi	Guddan Tumse Na Ho Payega गुड्डन तुमसे ना हो पायेगा	3 September 2018	Zee TV	26 January 2021	Original	
Telugu	Hitler Gari Pellam హిట్లర్ గారి పెళ్ళాం	17 August 2020	Zee Telugu	22 January 2022	Remake	
Tamil	Thirumathi Hitler திருமதி ஹிட்லர்	14 December 2020	Zee Tamil	8 January 2022	Remake	
Malayalam	Mrs. Hitler മിസിസ്. ഹിറ്റ്ലർ	19 April 2021	Zee Keralam	11 June 2023	Remake	
Kannada	Hitler Kalyana ಹಿಟ್ಲರ್ ಕಲ್ಯಾಣ	9 August 2021	Zee Kannada	14 March 2024	Remake	
Bengali	Tomar Khola Hawa তোমার খোলা হাওয়া	12 December 2022	Zee Bangla	29 July 2023	Remake	
Odia	Tu Khara Mun Chhai ତୁ ଖରା ମୁଁ ଛାଇ	2 January 2023	Zee Sarthak	Ongoing	Remake	
Marathi	Navri Mile Hitlerla नवरी मिळे हिटलरला	18 March 2024	Zee Marathi	25 May 2025	Remake	
Punjabi	Heer Tey Tedhi Kheer ਹੀਰ ਤੈ ਟੇਢੀ ਖੀਰ	1 April 2024	Zee Punjabi	29 March 2025	Remake	
