= Thirumathi Hitler =

2020 Tamil television series

- Genre: Drama; Romance; Comedy
- Written by: Dialogues; Palanisamy
- Screenplay by: Pandian Adhimoolam
- Directed by: S. N. Rajkumar
- Creative director: A. Abdullah
- Starring: Keerthana Podhuval; Amit Bhargav
- Music by: Rakshith. k (background score)
- Opening theme: "Paarvaiyil Thithipaa"
- Composer: Puneet Dixit
- Country of origin: India
- Original language: Tamil
- No. of episodes: 354

Production
- Producers: P Chandru; Ayesha Abdullah; Armaan Abdullah
- Cinematography: Sugaselvan
- Camera setup: Multi-camera
- Running time: 22 minutes
- Production company: Aayshmaan Production

Original release
- Network: Zee Tamil
- Release: 14 December 2020 – 8 January 2022

Related
- Guddan Tumse Na Ho Payega

Thirumathi Hitler (transl. Mrs. Hitler) is an Indian Tamil language drama television show which aired on Zee Tamil from 14 December 2020 and ended on 8 January 2022. The series stars Keerthana Podhuval and Amit Bhargav in the lead roles. It is an official remake of the Hindi television series Guddan Tumse Na Ho Payega.

From business to family, AJ believes that everything should be done in an orderly manner. Frustrated with his perfectionism, his daughters-in-law plot to get him married to an easy-going woman.

== Plot ==
Abinav Janardhan (AJ), who became a recluse after losing his wife Pravalika, is forced to remarry. He refuses at first, but agrees on the condition that the marriage should happen within a span of 15 days. AJ's three daughters-in-law – Archana, Maya, and Chitra – conduct a suyamwaram (for selecting a bride). Hasini accidentally enters the suyamwaram and mistakes AJ's daughters-in-law to be the producers of the film she was supposed to be auditioning for.

Archana and Chitra invite Hasini to meet AJ's mother, Jayamma, before learning that she was selected for AJ to marry. After hearing this she got shocked and angry and humiliates AJ. The next day Hasini's sister Swetha shows the newspaper with fake news about Hasini and AJ. Hasini is infuriated and goes to AJ's house where Komali humiliates him again. After she leaves, Jayamma tells him that instead of marrying a girl who wanted all wealth he could marry a girl who wants to save and protect her self-respect. AJ decides to marry Hasini and tries to convince her but all his efforts go in vain.

One day Hasini sees a girl with Badhri, her sister Swetha's lover, and mistakes that girl to be Swetha, later to find out she is Badhri's wife. Hasini is shocked and informs Swetha, who already knew he was married. Hasini warns Badri not to cross paths with Swetha, who attempts to commit suicide afterwards. AJ asks the doctor to perform the operation to save Swetha after Hasini admits her to the hospital. Hasini asks him to solve her problem and save her sister from Badri. With the help of a police officer, AJ threatens Badhri and makes him let go of Swetha and in turn asks Hasini to marry him.

At one point Hasini runs from AJ's house with Archana's help during the mehendi function. AJ is irritated and declares that he is going to marry Komali. During AJ's marriage, Badri blackmails Hasini to marry AJ by kidnapping Swetha. Hasini agrees, and knocks out Komali. AJ marries Hasin, who blames him for blackmailing and marrying her. Hasini is kidnapped on her way to police station to file a complaint against AJ by Vikram, a CBI officer. Vikram says that AJ is the reason for Pravalika's death, the one who pushed her off a cliff, and wants him to be jailed. Vikram also tells Hasini about the secret locker AJ possesses which contains some evidence against AJ. He threatens Hasini that if she does not help him he would arrest and imprison her father. Hasini enters AJ's house in an agreement that both of them had to prove that each other had married them by cheating.

== Cast ==
=== Main ===
- Keerthana Podhuval as Hasini Chakravarthy Janardhan a.k.a. Cakekaari – Chakravarthy's daughter; Keerthana's step-daughter; Swetha's half-sister; Abhinav's wife. (2020–2022)
- Amit Bhargav as Abhinav Janardhan a.k.a. AJ / Hitler – A professional cook; Jayamma's son; Pravalika's ex-husband; Hasini's husband; Varadhan and Kishore's foster father. (2020–2022)

=== Recurring ===
- Ambika as Jayamma – Abhinav's mother. (2020–2022)
- Manjula Paritala / Yamuna Chinnadurai as Pravalika Janardhan – Abhinav's ex-wife. (2020) / (2021–2022)
- Sowmya Rao Nadig / Mahalakshmi as Archana Varadhan – Varadhan's wife. (2020–2021) / (2021–2022)
- Subalakshmi Rangan / SK Sivanyaa as Maya Kishore – Komali's cousin; Kishore's wife. (2020–2021) / (2021–2022)
- Bhavya Sree as Chitra – Badhri's sister. (2020–2022)
- Keerthana as Keerthana Chakravarthy – Chakravarthy's second wife, Swetha's mother; Hasini's step-mother (2020–2022)
- G. Gnanasambandam as Chakravarthy – Keerthana's husband; Hasini and Swetha's father. (2020–2022)
- Swetha Senthilkumar as Swetha Chakravarthy – Keerthana and Chakravarthy's daughter; Hasini's half-sister. (2020–2022)
- Dharish Jayaseelan as Inspector Badhri – Chitra's brother; Sindhu's husband; Swetha's love interest; Hasini's enemy. (2020–2022)
- Ammu as Sindhu Badhri – Badhri's wife (2020–2022)
- Prithvi Krishna as Vardhan – Abhinav's foster son; Archana's husband. (2020–2022)
- Sugesh as Kishore – Abhinav's foster son; Maya's husband. (2020–2022)
- Janani as Komali – Abhinav's ex-fiancée; Maya's cousin (2020)
- Kousalya Senthamarai as Bhagyalakshmi – Vanangamudhi's grandmother.

=== Cameo ===
- Chaitra Reddy as Pournami: AJ's friend
- Vanitha Vijayakumar as Rajeshwari: AJ's aunt
- Arvind Kathare as AJ's former driver (episode-1)
- Nachathira as Bombay Divya: Hasini's friend and Manohar's wife (episode 202–204)
- Shreekumar as Manohar: Divya's husband (Episode 202–204)
- Puvi Arasu as Vanangamudhi: AJ's friend and Shantanayaki's husband
- Ashwini Radhakrishna as Shantanayaki: Vanangamudhi' wife

== Soundtrack ==
The theme music was composed by Osho Venkat. The song "Then Thuliyin" was composed by Puneet Dixit, where the karaoke was same in other versions of the series. This song was sung by Aslam and Sukanya (Sa Re Ga Ma Pa singers) and Lyrics by Yougin.

Thirumathi Hitler

Soundtrack album
- Released: 14 December 2020
- Recorded: 2020
- Genre: TV serial soundtrack
- Language: Tamil
- Label: Zee Tamil
- Producer: Puneet Dixit

Track list
| No. | Title | Music | Length |
|---|---|---|---|
| 1. | "Perfect ho" | Osho Venkat | 0:50 |
| 2. | "Paarvaiyil Thithipaa" | Osho Venkat | 1:20 |
| 3. | "Then Thuliyin Vizhiyaa" | Puneet Dixit | 5:00 |

=== Special episodes ===
From 1 March to 18 March 2021, Thirumathi Hitler had an arc for AJ's marriage sequences titled Thirumathi Hitler Thirumana Kondattam. The wedding scenes were shot in Bangalore and Mysore.

== Adaptations ==
| Language | Title | Original release | Network(s) | Last aired | Notes |
|---|---|---|---|---|---|
| Hindi | Guddan Tumse Na Ho Payega गुड्डन तुमसे ना हो पायेगा | 3 September 2018 | Zee TV | 26 January 2021 | Original |
| Telugu | Hitler Gari Pellam హిట్లర్ గారి పెళ్ళాం | 17 August 2020 | Zee Telugu | 22 January 2022 | Remake |
| Tamil | Thirumathi Hitler திருமதி ஹிட்லர் | 14 December 2020 | Zee Tamil | 8 January 2022 | Remake |
| Malayalam | Mrs. Hitler മിസിസ്. ഹിറ്റ്ലർ | 19 April 2021 | Zee Keralam | 11 June 2023 | Remake |
| Kannada | Hitler Kalyana ಹಿಟ್ಲರ್ ಕಲ್ಯಾಣ | 9 August 2021 | Zee Kannada | 14 March 2024 | Remake |
| Bengali | Tomar Khola Hawa তোমার খোলা হাওয়া | 12 December 2022 | Zee Bangla | 29 July 2023 | Remake |
| Odia | Tu Khara Mun Chhai ତୁ ଖରା ମୁଁ ଛାଇ | 2 January 2023 | Zee Sarthak | Ongoing | Remake |
| Marathi | Navri Mile Hitlerla नवरी मिळे हिटलरला | 18 March 2024 | Zee Marathi | 25 May 2025 | Remake |
| Punjabi | Heer Tey Tedhi Kheer ਹੀਰ ਤੈ ਟੇਢੀ ਖੀਰ | 1 April 2024 | Zee Punjabi | 29 March 2025 | Remake |
