= Mrs. Hitler =

2021 Malayalam television series

- Genre: Action; Drama; Comedy; Romance
- Written by: Prasad Panicker
- Screenplay by: Prasad Adoor
- Directed by: Manoj Sreelakam / Sunil Devikode
- Music by: Shaan Rahman
- Composer: Puneet Dixit
- Country of origin: India
- Original language: Malayalam
- No. of episodes: 714

Production
- Producer: Sharaf MH
- Cinematography: Manoj Kalagramam
- Editors: Shafeek, Bibin noble
- Camera setup: Multi-camera
- Running time: 22 minutes
- Production company: Fiction House Productions

Original release
- Network: Zee Keralam
- Release: 19 April 2021 – 11 June 2023

Related
- Guddan Tumse Na Ho Payega

Mrs. Hitler is an Indian Malayalam language romantic comedy-drama television show that aired on Zee Keralam from 19 April 2021 to 11 June 2023. The series stars Meghna Vincent and Shanavas Shanu / Arun G Raghavan in the lead roles. It is an official remake of Hindi television series Guddan Tumse Na Ho Payega.

== Plot ==
Jyothirmayi, a kind-hearted girl who belongs to an ordinary family was raised by her step-mother Ashalatha and her father Sudhakaran after her mother died when she was young. She is very caring towards her half-sister Priya who is a skilled baker. Devakrishnan, also known as DK, a wealthy businessman and is the son of Padmavatiamma. He adopted three sons: Sriram, Gokul and Balu, their wives are Maya, Thara and Chithra respectively. DK is also known as Hitler because of his arrogant attitude towards others. He lost his first wife Supriya and still lives in her memories.

Every year DK gets a letter from his late wife telling him what he has to do, Supriya gave all these letters to her good friend Pournami who would pass them on to DK. In the letter that he received after his 40th birthday, Supriya had written that he must find a new wife and get married in 15 days as she wants him to live happily. Padmavatiamma had been praying for years that her son would get married and he finally agreed to fulfil Supriya's wish. His three daughters-in-law were excited to have a new mother-in-law. They held 'Bride Interviews' as they only had a short amount of time to find a suitable wife for DK. Jyothirmayi was attending an audition for a film about 'Ramleela' as the character Seetha at the same place the 'Bride Interviews' were being held. Jyothirmayi went to the wrong place and she was interviewed to be a bride for DK. Thara wanted her cousin Sithara to be her new mother-in-law. Maya and Chithra both were impressed by Jyothirmayi's answers in the interview and chose her. However they did not know it was Jyothirmayi as she had used a different name- Janaki because she knew that they wouldn't let her be a part of the film because of the embarrassment she had caused to the Amaravati family. Jyothirmayi came to find that she attended the wrong interview and she left Amaravati. Later a false headline was published in the newspaper about DK and Jyothirmayi by Chithra. She came to the Amaravati house where DK was meeting Sithara and Jyothirmayi humiliated DK and his family. DK doesn't like Sithara and tells her to leave their home immediately.

Later, DK realises that Jyothirmayi is a good person and decides to marry her. He asks her once but she refuses because of his seven ridiculous conditions for his wife. Jyothirmayi's sister Priya fell in love with Avinash, a married man, Jyothirmayi told Priya to end things with him but she doesn't listen. Later, Priya attempts suicide for Avinash and she is rushed to the hospital but they say they won't treat her there but DK comes to the rescue and Priya's life has been saved. Jyothirmayi learns that DK helped her sister and then asks him for more help to save Priya from Avinash. DK agrees to help her and asks for a favour in return and Jyothirmayi agrees to do anything he says. Avinash breaks up with Priya and apologises.

A few days later, it is Padmavatiamma birthday and DK said he will announce who his second-wife will be. He had not told any one who it would be except his good friend Pournami. He announces that he second-wife will be Jyothirmayi and she is shocked. Padmavatiamma and Ashalatha are overjoyed but DK's three daughters-in-law are furious as they despise Jyothirmayi.

== Cast ==
=== Main ===
- Meghna Vincent as Jyothirmayi Devakrishna "Jyothi" (Mrs. Hitler)
  - A kind-hearted, jovial and easy-going girl; Bhanumathi and Sudhakaran's daughter; Asha's step daughter; Priya's step sister; DK's second wife.
- Shanavas Shanu (Episode 1–253)/Arun G Raghavan (Episode 253-714) as Deva Krishna "DK" (Hitler)
  - A wealthy and widower businessman; Padmavathiyamma's son; Maya, Thara and Chitra's parental father-in-law; Supriya's former husband and Jyothirmayi's husband.

=== Recurring ===
- Ponnamma Babu as Padmavathiyamma
  - (DK's mother and Jyothi's mother-in-law)
- Firoz Khan as Shiva Krishna (SK)
  - (Padmavatiyamma's second son, DK's brother and Jyothi's brother-in-law)
- Anjali Rao as Maya
  - (DK's first daughter-in-law, Sriram's wife)
- Sruthy Surendran (Manve) as Thara
  - (DK's second daughter-in-law, Gokul's wife)
- Akshaya Raghavan as Chitra
  - (DK's third daughter-in-law, Balu's wife)
- Archana Manoj as Asha Latha
  - (Sudhakaran's second wife, Priya's mother and Jyothi's step-mother)
- Munshi Renjith as Sudhakaran
  - (Jyothi and Priya's father and Asha's husband)
- Alice Christy as Priya
  - (Sudhakaran and Asha's daughter and Jyothi's sister)
- Souparnika Subhash as Supriya / Haripriya
  - DK's first wife/ Supriya's sister
- Alif Shah/Mithun MK as Sriram
  - (Maya's husband)
- Syam Namboothiri as Gokul
  - (Thara's husband)
- Vinayak as Balu
  - Chithra's husband
- Daveed John as Circle Inspector Avinash
  - A Womenizer, Chithra's elder brother, Soorya's husband
- Lakshmi Surendran as Sithara
  - Thara's sister and DK's ex-fiancée
- Renjusha Menon as Vyjayanthi
  - Murthi's wife and DK's enemy
- Shalu Menon as Hiranmayi
- Tom Mattel as Jayaprakash
- Akhil Anand as M P Vignesh
- Riya Isha as Annmary john IPS

=== Cameo ===
- Jaseela Parveen/Souparnika Subhash as Supriya : DK's first wife (alive) and Haripriya
  - Manjula Paritala/Jaseela Parveen as Supriya (dead and photo presence)
- Sudha as Bhanumathi: Jyothi's mother (dead and photo presence)
- Anusree as Anu : DK's friend (Kalyanam episodes)
- Richard Jose as Sidharth
- Swathy Nithyanand as Aparna
- Krishnapriya K Nair as Tulasi
- Sajeesh Nambiar as Adhi

=== Guest appearance ===
- Swasika as Nila
- Shiju Abdul Rasheed as Ravivarman
- Stebin as Anand Krishnan
- Vivek Gopan as Arun
- Mridula Vijay as Samyuktha
- Arun G Raghavan as Abhimanyu

== Adaptations ==
Language	Title	Original release	Network(s)	Last aired	Notes
Hindi	Guddan Tumse Na Ho Payega गुड्डन तुमसे ना हो पायेगा	3 September 2018	Zee TV	26 January 2021	Original
Telugu	Hitler Gari Pellam హిట్లర్ గారి పెళ్ళాం	17 August 2020	Zee Telugu	22 January 2022	Remake
Tamil	Thirumathi Hitler திருமதி ஹிட்லர்	14 December 2020	Zee Tamil	8 January 2022	Remake
Malayalam	Mrs. Hitler മിസിസ്. ഹിറ്റ്ലർ	19 April 2021	Zee Keralam	11 June 2023	Remake
Kannada	Hitler Kalyana ಹಿಟ್ಲರ್ ಕಲ್ಯಾಣ	9 August 2021	Zee Kannada	14 March 2024	Remake
Bengali	Tomar Khola Hawa তোমার খোলা হাওয়া	12 December 2022	Zee Bangla	29 July 2023	Remake
Odia	Tu Khara Mun Chhai ତୁ ଖରା ମୁଁ ଛାଇ	2 January 2023	Zee Sarthak	Ongoing	Remake
Marathi	Navri Mile Hitlerla नवरी मिळे हिटलरला	18 March 2024	Zee Marathi	25 May 2025	Remake
Punjabi	Heer Tey Tedhi Kheer ਹੀਰ ਤੈ ਟੇਢੀ ਖੀਰ	1 April 2024	Zee Punjabi	29 March 2025	Remake
