= Hitler Kalyana =

2021 Indian Kannada TV series

- Genre: Drama
- Directed by: Thrishool
- Starring: See below
- Opening theme: Hitler Kalyana
- Country of origin: India
- Original language: Kannada
- No. of episodes: 694

Production
- Producer: Dileep Raj
- Camera setup: Multi-camera
- Running time: 22 minutes

Original release
- Network: Zee Kannada
- Release: 9 August 2021 – 14 March 2024

Related
- Guddan Tumse Na Ho Payega

Hitler Kalyana is a 2021 Indian Kannada language television soap opera which is produced by Dileep Raj. It was premiered on 9 August 2020 and aired on Zee Kannada. The show is a remake of Hindi serial Guddan Tumse Na Ho Payega, which aired on Zee TV. The series stars Dileep Raj, Malaika Vasupal as the main leads.

== Cast ==
- Dileep Raj as Abhiram Jayshankar aka AJ
- Malaika Vasupal as Leela Abhiram Jayashankar
- Nandini Murthy/ Ruthu Sai as Durga (AJ's daughter-in-law)
- Neha Patil as Lakshmi (AJ's daughter-in-law)
- Padmini as Saraswati or Saru (AJ's daughter-in-law)
- Vidya Murthy as Sarojini
- Rajini as Antara / Prartana
- Vinay Kashyap as Prem
- Raki Gowda as Pramod
- Ravi Bhat as Chandrashekhar
- Abhinaya / Vanishri as Kousalya
- Deepika Aradhya as Revathi or Chukki
- Shashank as Dev (AJ's brother-in-law)
- Comedy Khiladigalu Rakesh as Vishwaroop
- Deepa Katte as Shwetha
- Shobitha as Chaya
- Harsha as Vikram

== Production ==
=== Filming ===
On April 2021, Chief Minister of Karnataka B.S.Yediyurappa announced a sudden curfew effective from 26 April. On 26 May, Dileep Raj decided to move Paaru and Hitler Kalyana's shooting to Ramoji Film City at Hyderabad.

== Adaptations ==
Language	Title	Original release	Network(s)	Last aired	Notes
Hindi	Guddan Tumse Na Ho Payega गुड्डन तुमसे ना हो पायेगा	3 September 2018	Zee TV	26 January 2021	Original
Telugu	Hitler Gari Pellam హిట్లర్ గారి పెళ్ళాం	17 August 2020	Zee Telugu	22 January 2022	Remake
Tamil	Thirumathi Hitler திருமதி ஹிட்லர்	14 December 2020	Zee Tamil	8 January 2022	Remake
Malayalam	Mrs. Hitler മിസിസ്. ഹിറ്റ്ലർ	19 April 2021	Zee Keralam	11 June 2023	Remake
Kannada	Hitler Kalyana ಹಿಟ್ಲರ್ ಕಲ್ಯಾಣ	9 August 2021	Zee Kannada	14 March 2024	Remake
Bengali	Tomar Khola Hawa তোমার খোলা হাওয়া	12 December 2022	Zee Bangla	29 July 2023	Remake
Odia	Tu Khara Mun Chhai ତୁ ଖରା ମୁଁ ଛାଇ	2 January 2023	Zee Sarthak	Ongoing	Remake
Marathi	Navri Mile Hitlerla नवरी मिळे हिटलरला	18 March 2024	Zee Marathi	25 May 2025	Remake
Punjabi	Heer Tey Tedhi Kheer ਹੀਰ ਤੈ ਟੇਢੀ ਖੀਰ	1 April 2024	Zee Punjabi	29 March 2025	Remake

== Reception ==
Dileep Raj, who is making a come back in small screen is the lead actor in the serial. Malaika T Vasupal is cast in the lead female role of Leela. The show was the most watched Kannada show in its debut week.
