= Katyayani Sharma =

Indian actress and model

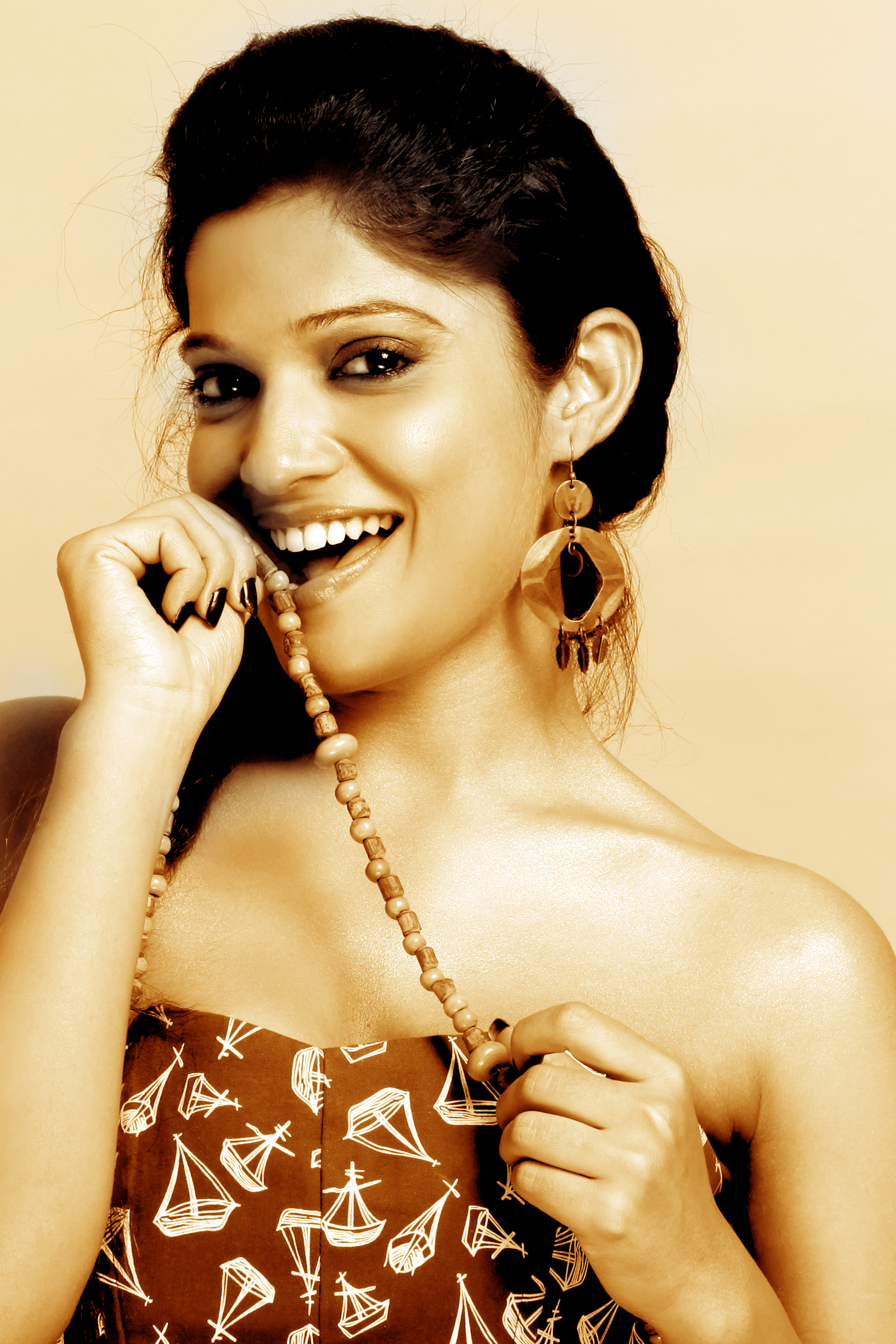
- Sharma in 2013
- Born: Renu Sharma; Amritsar, Punjab, India
- Occupations: Actress, model
- Years active: 2010–present

Katyayani Sharma (also known as Renu Sharma) is an Indian actress and model from Punjab. She started her career at a very early age, as a character of a rich girl 'Natasha' in Karam Apna Apna on Star Plus. She also starred as a lead actress in Sajan Ghar Jaana Hai on Star Plus. After then got a chance for Sathiya as a lead character, but she had to refuse that show, for a Tamil movie Parvathipuram in 2010.

== Career ==
She made her foray on the Tollywood in 2011 as a lead actress with Bhanu Chander's son, Jayanth and Sri Hari's Shiv Keshwa(2013). She appeared in three serials in Hindi. She has also appeared in numerous print and TV ads, like Abhiyan SOS, Mathoot Finance, ICICI, Horlicks. Katyayani Sharma started her career in Indian soap opera's in 2010 with Karam Apna Apna, Sajan Ghar Jaana Hai and Sathiya on Star Plus before moving on to Tamil Movies with Parvathipuram.

== Television ==
- Karam Apna Apna
- Sajan Ghar Jaana Hai
- Sathiya

== Filmography ==
Year	Film	Language	Opposite
2010	Parvathipuram	Tamil	Madan
2014	Siva Keshav	Telugu	Sri Hari
2017	Love Cross	Hindi	Gaurav Pratik
2017	Traap	Telugu	Brahmaji
