= Shashi Sumeet Productions =

Shashi Sumeet Productions Pvt. Ltd. is an Indian company founded by Shashi Mittal and Sumeet Hukamchand Mittal which produces Indian soap operas, entertainment and reality programming on Indian television. Some of its notable works include: Diya Aur Baati Hum, Punar Vivah, Yeh Un Dinon Ki Baat Hai, Barrister Babu, Meet: Badlegi Duniya Ki Reet, Dhruv Tara – Samay Sadi Se Pare.

== Current productions ==
Series	Genre	Channel	Premiere date	Starring
Taare Dhori Dhori Mone Kori	Drama; Mythology	Zee Bangla	8 December 2025	Pallavi Sharma, Biswarup Bandhopadhyay
Pati Brahmachari	Drama; Romance	Dangal TV	13 May 2025	Ashish Dixit, Prapti Shukla
Rimjhim - Choti Umar, Bada Safar	Drama; Romance	Dangal TV	13 October 2025	Himanshu Awasthi, Yashika Sharma

.

== Former productions ==
=== Soap operas ===
Year	TV series	Language	Network	Notes
2009–2010	Sajan Ghar Jaana Hai	Hindi	StarPlus	It is a heart warming story of a young bride's struggle to make a place for herself in her husband's house.
2011–2012	Haar Jeet	Hindi	Imagine TV	The show revolves around two girls who happen to be cousins whom parents leave in glamour world to live on their earnings.
2011–2012	Main Lakshmi Tere Aangan Ki	Hindi	Life OK	It is the story of a middle-class girl named Lakshmi who wants money because her mother died of pneumonia since they couldn't afford her treatment.
2011–2016	Diya Aur Baati Hum	Hindi	StarPlus	This show is about Sandhya who becomes an IPS officer despite being married to a confectioner named Sooraj who helps fulfill her dream.
2012–2013	Punar Vivaah - Zindagi Milegi Dobara	Hindi	Zee TV	It is the story of the two individuals Yash and Aarti who are remarried and their life there after.
2013	Punar Vivah - Ek Nayi Umeed	Hindi	Zee TV	It is the story is about two old lovers Raj and Divya, who are separated by circumstances but they meet after ten years.
2012	Kairi — Rishta Khatta Meetha	Hindi	Colors TV	It is the story of a newly wed girl named Ambika seeking love from her husband in an arranged marriage and at the same time, fighting for her rights with her mother-in-law.
2013	Dil Ki Nazar Se Khoobsurat	Hindi	SET	The show explores the story of Aradhya, Rahul and Madhav.
2013–2014	Tumhari Paakhi	Hindi	Life OK	The show explores the lives of Anshuman and Paakhi and their love thereof.
2014–2015	Ek Rishta Aisa Bhi	Hindi	Sony Pal	It is the story of five sisters who runs a fancy dress store.
2014–2015	Tu Mera Hero	Hindi	StarPlus	It is the story of lazy Titu and his life changes as he marries Panchi and ultimately becomes Panchi's hero.
2015	Muh Boli Shaadi	Hindi	SET	The show is about the marriages made through promises.
2015	Tum Hi Ho Bandhu Sakha Tumhi	Hindi	Zee TV	The show is about a happy family consisting of six siblings.
2015	Badii Devrani	Hindi	&TV	The show is about a happy Marwari family.
2015	Hum Aapke Ghar Mein Rehte Hain	Hindi	Sony SAB	The story is about a former dacoit, Bachani Devi, who has surrendered and has turned into a peaceful person but is still feared by the people. She captures the house of a professor Tripathi thus starting a feud with his family. Bachani Devi has a granddaughter, Shakti, who is tomboyish and a prankster and Professor Tripathi has a son, Raghav, who is a bookworm. Shakti's pranks often target Raghav. Shakti and Raghav's story takes a turn when Shakti's friend, Pinki, starts liking Raghav.
2015–2016	Dream Girl — Ek Ladki Deewani Si	Hindi	Life OK	The show is about Lakshmi who always dreamt to be a movie star.
2017	Pehredaar Piya Ki	Hindi	SET	It follows the life of a girl, Diya, who fulfills the wish of a dying man by taking the responsibility of an orphan boy, Ratan Maan Singh, by marrying him. What follows next is a beautiful bond of friendship between the couple and being there for each other in an unromantic way. She then becomes the temporary owner of Maan Singh Heritage Group of Hotels until Ratan is old enough to take over.
2017–2018	Akbar Rakht Se Takht Ka Safar	Hindi	BIG Magic	It is based on the life story of Mughal emperor Akbar.
2017	TV, Biwi Aur Main	Hindi	Sony SAB	Rajeev, a television daily-soap producer, is a workaholic, much to his wife's dismay. Hilarity ensues when he tries to strike a balance between his personal and professional life. Show covers the comic timings created between Priya (Rajeev's wife) and Rajeev's mom who is not satisfied with her son's choice and wanted a daughter-in-law just like Bindiya (Rajeev's show's heroine). She thinks Bindiya is a perfect daughter-in-law as she portrays in the show and compares Priya with Bindiya, though in reality Bindiya is a self-centered arrogant attention seeker. As the time passes Rajeev's mom is shown to have a soft corner for Priya. The show ended with Rajeev receiving a chance to produce one more show in the same channel and he thanks everyone including his team and family for supporting him in his journey.
2017	Nakushi Tarihi Havihavishi	Marathi	Star Pravah	Nakushi, a girl child rejected by her father tries to make her father to realise importance of a girl child.
2017–2018	Dil Se Dil Tak	Hindi	Colors TV	The lives of Parth and Shorvori, a happily married couple, change after the entry of Teni, a young bubbly girl, who decides to become a surrogate mother to their child.
2017–2018	Tu Sooraj, Main Saanjh Piyaji	Hindi	StarPlus	A sequel to the series Diya Aur Baati Hum, Sooraj and Sandhya's daughter, Kanak sets off on a journey with Uma Shankar, who is her perfect opposite.
2017–2019	Yeh Un Dinon Ki Baat Hai	Hindi	SET	The show is based on the Sameer and Naina's love story and is set in the 1990s. It is inspired by the real-life love story of producers Shashi and Sumeet Mittal.
2017–2018	Rishta Likhenge Hum Naya	Hindi	SET	The series is a restructuring of Pehredaar Piya Ki. Twelve years after Diya promised Ratan Maan Singh's dying father that she will protect his child from all dangers, she continues to honour her promise amidst the intrigue of his royal household.
2018	Mitegi Laxman Rekha	Hindi	&TV	Kanchan is a young woman who has never been weighed down by boundaries. On the surface she appears to be fearless and put together but is actually battling internal dilemmas. Her life takes turn when her path crosses with Vishesh, a real life Rajkumar, who has a similar outlook towards life and doesn't give in to the patriarchal mindset of the society.
2018–2019	Karn Sangini	Hindi	StarPlus	It is a Mythological show, which revolves around the life of Karn and his wife Uruvi, and the hardships faced by them.
2019	Asha Lata	Bengali	Sun Bangla	Asha and Lata, two sisters who come from a musical background, are always at odds with each other. Their rivalry intensifies when a man Dhruba enters their lives.
2019–2020	Abhilasha	Telugu	Gemini TV	
2019–2020	Shubharambh	Hindi	Colors TV	Raja Reshammiya, a son from a wealthy family lacks self-confidence and Rani Dave, a sharp girl belongs to a poor family. Raja and Rani meet and start off on a conflicting note but later fall in love.
2020	Naangaraju	Hindi	Disney Channel	
2020–2021	Aye Mere Humsafar	Hindi	Dangal TV	
2020–2021	Bhaggolokkhi	Bengali	Star Jalsha	Bhagyashree a simple, yet strong-willed girl who despite facing rejections from her relatives stands strong with her husband and brother in law's and revives their lost business and also wins the heart of her mother-in-law.
2020–2021	Shaadi Mubarak	Hindi	StarPlus	A widow and an ex-film star both in their 40s, partner up to start a wedding planning firm. Thus begins a unique tale of self-respect, friendship and love.
2019–2021	Ki Kore Bolbo Tomay	Bengali	Zee Bangla	The story mainly revolves around Radhika and Karna's life. Radhika, a kind-hearted woman. She is a fashion designer by profession and where she wants to be in life and is focused on her goals and her boss Karna who is the CEO of Sen Creations and by fate they marry each other. At first, they have problems but as time passes they realise their love for each other live happily. It has been remade in Malayalam as Pranayavarnangal On Zee Keralam channel which is airing from 18 October 2021.
2020–2021	Barrister Babu	Hindi	Colors TV	Bondita, a child bride, overcomes the restrictions of a patriarchal society and becomes a barrister with the help of her progressive husband Anirudh. Together, they fight for women rights and raise a voice against social evils, while falling in love with each other.
2020–2022	Tera Yaar Hoon Main	Hindi	Sony SAB	Rajeev Bansal, a simpleton, wishes to build a rapport with and become a close confidant and friend to his teenaged son Rishabh. When Rajeev has to reluctantly remarry post his wife's death, his relationship with Rishabh is tested as the latter gets insecure and emotionally wounded by this.
2021	Kyun Utthe Dil Chhod Aaye	Hindi	SET	Amrit, Vashma and Radha are three women who live in Lahore at a time when India is on the cusp of gaining independence. They hope to achieve their dreams and find success in their love lives with Randheer Uday and Brij respectively.
2022	Mose Chhal Kiye Jaaye	Hindi	SET	It is the story of a girl named Saumya who dreams of becoming a writer and wants to work even after marriage. But her marriage is fixed with Armaan Oberoi, a famous TV producer who promises her to make a career but the reality hits different.
2021–2023	Meet: Badlegi Duniya Ki Reet	Hindi	Zee TV	
2021–2022	Kori Khela	Bengali	Zee Bangla	The story centers on Pari and Apurba. Pari, a widow lady (who wasn't actually widow which she get to know later) and independent single mother, who lives with her son Kuttush. Her mother-in-law wants her to remarry, but she disagrees. She meets Apurba who seems to be responsible by nature. Whether Pari gives herself a second chance or not, makes the rest of the story.
2022–2023	Banni Chow Home Delivery	Hindi	StarPlus	Delivery-girl Banni is a feisty young woman who makes a living out of her catering and door-to-door food delivery business. She soon crosses paths with Yuvan, a mentally disabled man whom she eventually marries as a compromise. The show follows how Banni protects Yuvan from her in-laws who kept torturing him mentally and physically for years and also how she explores his musical talent and decides to make him a rockstar despite his mental illness.
2022–2023	Durga Aur Charu	Hindi	Colors TV	A show that captures the true essence of pre and post-independence era by following the story of two sisters separated by destiny. They are daughters of a renowned Barrister couple of Kolkata – Anirudh and Bondita. Bondita's elder daughter Charu carries all her traits and is fierce and outspoken just like her mother, but with her sister Durga, she has become meek and pessimistic after getting separated from Charu.
2022–2023	Indrani	Bengalii	Colors Bangla	
2022–2023	Tomar Khola Hawa	Bengali	Zee Bangla	
2022-2024	Lagnachi Bedi	Marathi	Star Pravah	
2023	Jyoti... Umeedon Se Sajee	Hindi	Dangal	
2023–2024	Do Chutki Sindoor	Hindi	Nazara	
2023–2024	Dhruv Tara – Samay Sadi Se Pare	Hindi	Sony SAB	
2023–2025	Premachi Gosht	Marathi	Star Pravah	
2024	Mehndi Wala Ghar	Hindi	SET	
2024	Mera Balam Thanedaar	Hindi	Colors TV	
2024–2025	Main Dil Tum Dhadkan	Hindi	Shemaroo Umang	
2025–2026	Tui Amar Hero	Bengali	Zee Bangla	
2025	Kon Hotis Tu Kay Zalis Tu!	Marathi	Star Pravah	
2025–2026	Saru	Hindi	Zee TV	
2026	Pati Anadi	Hindi	Dangal TV	

=== Reality shows ===
Year	Show	Network
2016 – 2017	Aji Sunte Ho	Zee TV
2016	Rivals In Law	FYI TV18
2016	India's Deadliest Roads	History TV18
