= Zalak Desai =

Indian actress (born 1992)

- Born: 21 December 1992 (age 33); Mumbai, Maharashtra, India
- Occupation: Actress
- Years active: 2009–present
- Known for: Sajan Ghar Jaana Hai; Mooh Boli Shaadi; RadhaKrishn; Anupamaa
- Spouse: Neerav Shah (m. 2020)
- Parent: Falguni Desai (mother)

Zalak Desai (born 21 December 1992) is an Indian actress who works in Hindi television. Desai is known for her portrayal of Sarala Ambar Raghuvanshi in Sajan Ghar Jaana Hai, Anmol Singh in Mooh Boli Shaadi, Rukmini in RadhaKrishn and Khyati Patel Kothari in Anupamaa.

== Life and career ==
Zalak is the daughter of Gujarati actress Falguni Desai. She was born and brought up in Mumbai. Zalak started her as a child artist(child Saloni)from the serial Saat Phere -Saloni ka Safar and at the age of 16 in serial Sajan Ghar Jaana Hai in 2009, just after she completed her 10th standard with 90 percentage aggregate from R.N. Shah High School, Mumbai. She took a break to complete her 12th and graduation in B.Sc Biotechnology from Mithibai College (University of Mumbai) and returned in the Sony Entertainment Television's serial Mooh Boli Shaadi in 2015. Later, she worked in the serial Mooh Boli Shaadi. She played Komal in Laado 2.

In December 2019 she started playing goddess Rukmini alongside Sumedh Mudgalkar and Mallika Singh in Star Bharat's RadhaKrishn until it off-aired in January 2023. She married Neerav Shah on 27 December 2020. From January 2025 to September 2026, she played Khyati Patel Kothari opposite Rahil Azam in StarPlus' Anupamaa.

== Filmography ==
=== Films ===
Year	Title	Role	Notes
2020	The Helping Hand	Parul	Short film

=== Television ===
Year	Title	Role	Notes	Ref.
2009–2010	Sajan Ghar Jaana Hai	Sarala Amber Raghuvanshi		
2015	Mooh Boli Shaadi	Anmol Singh		
2015	Hum Aapke Ghar Mein Rehte Hain	Pinky		
2015–2016	Siya Ke Ram	Shanta		
2017	Ek Rishta Saajhedari Ka	Nikita		
2017–2018	Laado 2	Komal Singh Choudhary Kriplani		
2018	Laal Ishq	Chaaya	Episode: "Siddhak Ka Shrap"	
2019	Namah Lakshmi Narayan	Saraswati		
2020	Shubharambh	Darshana Reshammiya		
2019–2023	RadhaKrishn	Rukmini		
2022	RadhaKrishn	Padmavati		
2024	Karmadhikari Shanidev	Dhamini		
2024	Kashi Vishwanath	Lakshmi		
2025–2026	Anupamaa	Khyati Patel Kothari		
