= Vallari Viraj =

Indian actress

- Born: 20 July 1998 (age 28); Mumbai, Maharashtra, India
- Other name: Vallari Viraj Londhe
- Education: M.L. Dahanukar College of Commerce
- Occupations: Actress; Model; Entrepreuner
- Years active: 2021–present
- Known for: Kanni, Navri Mile Hitlerla
- Parent(s): Viraj Londhe, Vaishali Londhe

Vallari Viraj Londhe (born 20 July 1998; Vallari Viraj Londhe), professionally known as Vallari Viraj is an Indian film actress and entrepreneur. She is known for her roles in Punyashlok Ahilyabai, Navri Mile Hitlerla and Kanni.

== Early life ==
Vallari Viraj was born as Vallari Viraj Londhe on July 20, 1998, in Mumbai, India, as the elder child of Viraj Londhe, a Chartered accountant and Vaishali Londhe, a producer. She has a younger sibling, Vedant Londhe. Vallari completed her schooling at Balmohan Vidyamandir in Dadar, Mumbai, and later graduated from M. L. Dahanukar College of Commerce, Mumbai.

== Acting career ==
Vallari won a title of M. ta. Shravan Queen 2019. After this in 2021, she entered in acting career with debut role of Parvatibai in Punyashlok Ahilyabai. In 2023, she appeared in an Amazon miniTV series Slum Golf. She is known for her work in Bollywood, particularly for her roles in the Marathi and Hindi movies Kanni, Main Ladega, which was released in 2024. She is popular for her role in Zee Marathi Serial Navri Mile Hitlerla as Leela Abhiram Jahagirdar. In this series Vallari is paired opposite to Raqesh Bapat who plays the role of Abhiram Jahagirdar.

Vallari is trained Kathak classical dancer with 10–12 years of training in this indian classical dance form. In addition to her acting career, Vallari Viraj is an entrepreneur and owner of the Pet Salon "Bath and Barks" in Mumbai, Maharashtra. She currently resides in Mumbai, Maharashtra.

== Filmography ==
=== Television ===
Year	Title	Role	Channel	Ref.
2021- 2023	Punyashlok Ahilyabai	Parvatibai Sahib Holkar	Sony Entertainment Television	
2024-2025	Navri Mile Hitlerla	Leela Mohite Jahagirdar	Zee Marathi	
2024	Chala Hawa Yeu Dya	Guest appearance	Zee Marathi	
2026	Shubh Shravani	Shravani Rajeshirke Shelar	Zee Marathi	

=== Films ===
Year	Title	Role	Language	Ref.
2024	Main Ladega	Gauri	Hindi	
2024	Kanni	Neha	Marathi	

=== OTT Projects ===
Year	Title	Role	Channel	Ref.
2023	Slum Golf	Aarushi	Amazon miniTV	
2025	Hit and Viral	Maya Deshmukh	Zee5's Bullet	

== Awards/Accolades ==
Year	Awards	Category	Nominated work	Role	Result	Ref.
2019	Maharashtra Times Shravan Queen	Maharashtra’s Shravan Queen	—N/a	—N/a	Won	
2024	Zee Marathi Utsav Natyancha Awards	Best Mother-in-law	Navri Mile Hitlerla	Leela Abhiram Jahagirdar	Won	
2024	Zee Marathi Utsav Natyancha Awards	Best Daughter-in-law	Navri Mile Hitlerla	Leela Abhiram Jahagirdar	Won	
2024	Zee Marathi Utsav Natyancha Awards	Special Striking Face	Navri Mile Hitlerla	Leela Abhiram Jahagirdar	Won	
2024	Zee Marathi Utsav Natyancha Awards	Best Couple (Leela-AJ)	Navri Mile Hitlerla	Leela Abhiram Jahagirdar	Won	
2024	Zee Marathi Utsav Natyancha Awards	Best Actress	Navri Mile Hitlerla	Leela Abhiram Jahagirdar	Nominated	
2024	Zee Marathi Utsav Natyancha Awards	Best Daughter	Navri Mile Hitlerla	Leela Abhiram Jahagirdar	Nominated	
2024	Zee Marathi Utsav Natyancha Awards	Best Sister	Navri Mile Hitlerla	Leela Abhiram Jahagirdar	Nominated	
2025	25th Maharashtra Times Awards	Fresh face of the year	Navri Mile Hitlerla	Leela Abhiram Jahagirdar	Won	
