= Kori Khela =

Indian Bengali language drama

- Genre: Drama; Family
- Created by: Sumeet Hukamchand Mittal; Shashi Mittal
- Screenplay by: Malova Majumder
- Story by: Prashant Rathi; Dialogues; Pranita
- Directed by: Amit Das
- Creative director: Srijit Roy
- Starring: Sriparna Roy; Ananda Ghosh
- Voices of: Shubhamita
- Theme music composer: Indrashish
- Opening theme: "Eri Nam Kori Khela"
- Country of origin: India
- Original language: Bengali
- No. of episodes: 290

Production
- Executive producers: Srijita Chakraborty (Shashi Sumeet Productions); Krishanu Ganguly; Aniruddha Ghosh (Zee Bangla)
- Producer: Sumeet Hukamchand Mittal
- Cinematography: Alak Chowdhury
- Editors: Jishu Nath; Biplab Mandal; Sumanta Kunti
- Camera setup: Multi-camera
- Running time: 22 minutes
- Production company: Shashi Sumeet Productions

Original release
- Network: Zee Bangla
- Release: 8 March 2021 – 29 April 2022

Related
- Punar Vivaah – Zindagi Milegi Dobara

Kori Khela is an Indian Bengali language drama television series aired on the Bengali general entertainment channel Zee Bangla. It premiered from 8 March 2021 and starred by Sriparna Roy and Ananda Ghosh. The series is produced by Sumeet Mittal and Sumeet Mittal under the banner of Shashi Sumeet Productions. It is remake of Zee TV's Hindi series Punar Vivaah – Zindagi Milegi Dobara.

== Plot ==
The story centers on Pari and Apurba. Pari, a widow lady (who wasn’t actually widow which she get to know later) and independent single mother, who lives with her son Kuttush. Her mother-in-law wants her to remarry, but she disagrees. She meets Apurba who seems to be responsible by nature. Whether Pari gives herself a second chance or not, makes the rest of the story.

Apurba and Pari marry, thinking about their children who need proper parenting. At first Srija couldn't accept Paromita but as time passes and when Paromita saves Srija from the trap of the false Shantanu by giving her life at stake she understands how much Pari loves her and accepts her. Soon, Anu comes to Ganguly house to accompany Srija and forms a nice bond with Pari. Also, Chaitali accepts Paromita as her daughter-in-law and regards her as the Laxmi of their house. Anu along with Aniket, Subhra, Misty, Tonni and Souvik plans to make Apurbo and Paromita closer for which Anu intentionally gets closer to Apurbo so that Paromita becomes jealous and confesses her rights of being his wife. They also reveal their plan to Chaitali who also promises to keep it a secret. Later Ganguly family members opens a cafe but Ritu oppessos as she was having external martial affair with Jayanta who was also running a cafe. She and Joyonto fears that her cafe might affect his cafe. Later then plans many things to stop her cafe but fails. At last Ritu mixes a chemical powder to Pori's food and she goes to jail. Later she gets bailed as all the truth gets revealed. Ritu and Joyonto gets arrested although Ritu was bailed. Later Sutapa and Ani refuse to keep Ritu at their home. Ani divorces Ritu and Ritu tries to brainwash Sutapa against Paromita but fails to do so.

== Cast ==
=== Main ===
- Sriparna Roy as Paromita Ganguly (née Sengupta, formerly Mitra) aka Pari: Himangshu's former wife and Apurba's second wife, Kuttus's mother, Srija and Gunja's step-mother
- Ananda Ghosh as Apurba Ganguly: Atreyee's widower, Paromita's second husband, Srija and Gunja's father, Kuttus's step-father
- Jishnu Bhattacharya as Arjo Ganguly (formerly Mitra) aka Kuttus: Himanshu and Paromita's son, Apurba's step-son
- Srija Bhattacharjee as Gunja Ganguly: Atreyee and Apurba's younger daughter, Pari's step-daughter
- Beas Dhar as Srija Ganguly: Atreyee and Apurba's eldest daughter, Pari's step-daughter, Vicky's best friend and love interest

=== Recurring ===
- Mou Bhattacharya as Chitra Mitra (née Bose): Himanshu's mother, Pari's mother-in-law, Kuttus's grandmother
- Arka Prabha Bhattacharya as Himangshu Mitra (Before surgery)
- Raj Bhattacharya as Himangsu Mitra / Pushkar Barua: Pari's first husband, Kuttush's father and Chitra's son (After surgery)
- Saibal Bhattacharya as Nilankur Barua: Paromita's customer and Himangu's adoptive father after face surgery, Pushkar's "Debota".
- Sarbani Chatterjee as Sumi: Tonni's mother, Chitra's sister.
- Priyanka Chakrabarty as Late Atreyee Ganguly: Apurba's first wife, Srija and Gunja's biological mother and Annwesha's elder sister
- Tanuka Chatterjee as Chaitali Ganguly: Apurba, Souvik and Subhra's mother, Paromita's second mother-in-law; Aniket and Misty's aunt
- Manishankar Banerjee as Anumoy Ganguly: Apurba, Souvik and Subhra's father; Paromita's second father-in-law; Aniket and Misty's uncle
- Shyamashis Pahari as Subinoy Ganguly: Misty and Aniket's father; Apurba, Souvik and Subhra's uncle; Ritu's father-in-law
- Rajashree Bhowmik as Sutapa Ganguly: Misty and Aniket's mother; Apurba, Souvik and Subhra's aunt; Ritu's former mother-in-law, Ananda and Anu's mother-in-law
- Twarita Chatterjee as Subhra Sinha (née Ganguly): Apurba's younger sister, Souvik's eldest sister, Misty and Aniket's cousin and Koushik's wife
- Fahim Mirza as Koushik Sinha: Subhra's husband
- Prantik Banerjee / Debomoy Mukherjee as Souvik Ganguly: Chaitali and Anumoy's adopted son, Apurba and Subhra's younger brother, Misty and Aniket's cousin, Tonni's husband, a folk singer
- Ritu Rai Acharya as Tonni Ganguly (née Mukherjee): Pari's sister-in-law and Souvik's wife.
- Soumi Banerjee as Annwesha aka Anu; Aniket's second wife, late Atreyee's younger sister, Srija and Gunja's aunt. She was in a love relation with Koushik, unaware that he is married to Subhra, but later she learns the truth and exposes Koushik.
- Neil Chatterjee as Aniket Ganguly aka Ani: Ritu's former husband, Anu's husband, Subinoy and Sutapa's son, Misty's brother; Apurba, Souvik and Subhra's cousin
- Hridlekha Banerjee as Ritu: Aniket's former wife. She was having an extra-marital affair with Jayanta and she opposes Paromita's café.
- Subhajit Banerjee as Jayanta Chowdhury: Ritu's secret lover, owner of Cuppa Café, Paromita's business rival
- Bhavana Banerjee as Misty Ganguly: Subinoy and Sutapa's daughter, Aniket's sister; Apurba, Souvik and Subhra's cousin; Ananda's wife
- Rahul Mukherjee as Ananda: Misty's husband
- Arunava Dey as Rony / fake Santanu Choudhury: a terrorist
- Ayush Das as Vicky: Srija's best friend and love interest
- Suchandrima as Sharbani Roy: Vicky's aunt; Paromita's lawyer
- Suman Banerjee as Shibesh Bhattacharya: Himanshu's Lawyer
- Madhupriya Chowdhury as an anchor of Byabsayi Bouma reality show
- Namita Chakrabarty as Nandini Chakrabarty: Atreyee and Annwesha's mother
- Debopriya Basu as Pupu: Vicky's new friend

== Adaptations ==
Language	Title	Original release	Network(s)	Last aired	Notes
Hindi	Punar Vivaah – Zindagi Milegi Dobara पुनर्विवाह – ज़िंदगी मिलेगी दोबारा	20 February 2012	Zee TV	29 November 2013	Original
Bengali	Kori Khela কড়ি খেলা	8 March 2021	Zee Bangla	29 April 2022	Remake
Telugu	Oohalu Gusagusalade ఊహలు గుసగుసలాడే	10 May 2021	Zee Telugu	8 June 2024	Remake
Tamil	Anbe Sivam அன்பே சிவம்	18 October 2021	Zee Tamil	3 July 2022	Remake
Marathi	Punha Kartavya Aahe पुन्हा कर्तव्य आहे	18 March 2024	Zee Marathi	15 March 2025	Remake
Punjabi	Nava Mod ਨਵਾ ਮੋਡ	2 December 2024	Zee Punjabi	31 May 2025	Remake
