= Punha Kartavya Aahe =

2024 Indian Marathi language TV series

- Genre: Drama
- Starring: See below
- Country of origin: India
- Original language: Marathi
- No. of episodes: 314

Production
- Producer: Jitendra Gupta
- Production locations: Mumbai, Maharashtra
- Camera setup: Multi-camera
- Running time: 22 minutes
- Production company: Tell-a-Tale Media

Original release
- Network: Zee Marathi
- Release: 18 March 2024 – 15 March 2025

Related
- Punar Vivaah – Zindagi Milegi Dobara

Punha Kartavya Aahe (transl. There is marriage again) is an Indian Marathi language TV series which aired on Zee Marathi. It starred Akshay Mhatre and Akshaya Hindalkar in lead roles. It premiered from 18 March 2024 along with Navri Mile Hitlerla. It is an official remake of Zee TV's Hindi TV series Punar Vivaah – Zindagi Milegi Dobara. It is produced by Jitendra Gupta under the banner of Tell-a-Tale Media. It ended on 15 March 2025 completing 314 episodes.

== Plot ==
Akash, a widowed father of twin girls and Vasundhara, a divorced mother with a son, get a second chance at marriage and parenting, but their path ahead is strewn with challenges.

== Cast ==
=== Main ===
- Akshay Mhatre as Akash Madhav Thakur
- Akshaya Hindalkar as Vasundhara Shardul Ranade / Vasundhara Akash Thakur

=== Recurring ===
Vasundhara's family

- Pankaj Chemburkar as Sudhir Ranade
- Shama Ninave as Sushila Sudhir Ranade
- Siddhesh Prabhakar as Shardul Sudhir Ranade (Lucky)
- Reyansh Juvatkar as Anvay Shardul Ranade / Anvay Akash Thakur (Bunny)

Akash's family

- Ovi Karmarkar as Mrunmayee Akash Thakur (Manu)
- Ruhi Jawir as Chinmayee Akash Thakur (Chinu)
- Vandana Sardesai-Waknis as Jayashri Madhav Thakur
- Sudesh Mhashilkar as Madhav Thakur
- Mrunal Deshpande as Mangal Thakur
- Shubhangi Sadavarte as Avani Bhaskar Thakur
- Deepkar Parkar as Bhaskar Madhav Thakur
- Vinesh Ninnurkar as Akhil Madhav Thakur
- Rutuja Junnarkar as Tanaya Sadanand Bhalekar / Tanaya Akhil Thakur
- Sai Morankar as Aditi Bhaskar Thakur

Others

- Vandana Gupte as Gurumata
- Sanyogita Bhave as Vishakha Sadanand Bhalekar
- Yogesh Kelkar as Sadanand Bhalekar
- Rushikesh Bhosale as Anuj Sadanand Bhalekar
- Ashutosh Wadekar as Baby
- Samata Jadhav as Kunda
- Purva Kaushik as Shivani Ashutosh Desai

== Adaptations ==
Language	Title	Original release	Network(s)	Last aired	Notes
Hindi	Punar Vivaah – Zindagi Milegi Dobara पुनर्विवाह – ज़िंदगी मिलेगी दोबारा	20 February 2012	Zee TV	29 November 2013	Original
Kannada	Punar Vivaha ಪುನರ್ ವಿವಾಹ	8 April 2013	Zee Kannada	29 July 2016	Remake
Bengali	Kori Khela কড়ি খেলা	8 March 2021	Zee Bangla	29 April 2022	Remake
Telugu	Oohalu Gusagusalade ఊహలు గుసగుసలాడే	10 May 2021	Zee Telugu	8 June 2024	Remake
Tamil	Anbe Sivam அன்பே சிவம்	18 October 2021	Zee Tamil	3 July 2022	Remake
Marathi	Punha Kartavya Aahe पुन्हा कर्तव्य आहे	18 March 2024	Zee Marathi	15 March 2025	Remake
Punjabi	Nava Mod ਨਵਾ ਮੋਡ	2 December 2024	Zee Punjabi	31 May 2025	Remake

== Awards ==
Zee Marathi Utsav Natyancha Awards 2024
Category	Recipient	Role	Ref.
Best Father	Akshay Mhatre	Akash Thakur	

=== Special episode (1 hour) ===
- 28 July 2024
- 18 August 2024
- 22 December 2024
