= Oohalu Gusagusalade (TV series) =

Indian drama television series

- Genre: Romance
- Directed by: Bheemagani Sreevardhan Reddy
- Starring: Akul Balaji; Roopa Shravan
- Country of origin: India
- Original language: Telugu
- No. of episodes: 966

Production
- Running time: 22 minutes

Original release
- Network: Zee Telugu
- Release: 10 May 2021 – 8 June 2024

Related
- Punar Vivaah – Zindagi Milegi Dobara

Oohalu Gusagusalade (transl. Imaginations whispered) is an Indian Telugu language soap opera directed by Bheemagani Sreevardhan Reddy. It aired from 10 May 2021 to 8 June 2024 on Zee Telugu. The series stars Akul Balaji and Roopa Shravan in lead roles. It is a remake of Zee TV's Hindi TV series Punar Vivaah – Zindagi Milegi Dobara.

The show is also dubbed into Kannada as Punar Vivaha on Zee Kannada from 30 August 2021 to 30 June 2024. and in Malayalam as Ayalum Njanum Thammil on Zee Keralam from 19 September 2022 to 10 August 2024.

== Plot ==
The story revolves around Abhiram, a widowed father of twin girls and Vasundhara, a divorced mother with a son. They both get a second chance to marry.

== Cast ==
=== Main ===
- Akul Balaji as Abhiram "Abhi"; event manager
- Roopa Shravan as Vasundhara "Vasu"
- Karthik as Bunny; son of Va
- Baby Seetha as Keerthy; elder daughter of Abhiram
  - Baby Rithwika Sri as Keerthy; replaced by Baby Seetha
- Baby Suhani as Anu; younger daughter of Abhiram
  - Baby Sanvi as Anu; replaced by Baby Suhani

=== Recurring ===
- Anil Chowdary as Akhil; Abhiram's younger brother
- Shashikanth as Bhaskar; Abhiram's and Akhil's elder brother
- Shaik Mumtaz as Pavani; Bhaskar's wife
- Padmini Jagadeesh as Jayanthi; Bhaskar, Abhi and Akhil's mother
- Bose Babu as Ram Mohan; Bhaskar, Abhi and Akhil's father
- Seetha as Susheela; Vasundhara's mother
- Vara Prasad as Ram Prasad; Vasundhara's father
- Naveena as Sumangali; Abhiram's paternal aunt
- Priyanka as Harika; Akhil's wife
  - Prasanna as Harika; Replaced by Priyanka
- Bhavishya as Sravya
- Prem Sagar as Harika's father
- Sandhya Rani as Chamundeshwari; Harika's mother
- Sumanasri as Abhi's first wife Sandhya's mother
- Chittajallu Satya Prasad as Abhi's first wife Sandhya's father
- Shilpa Reddy as Pinky; Vasundhara's friend
- Dawood Proddatur as Raghu
- CH Krishnaveni as Taayaru
- Sunitha Manohar
- Shiva Kumar as Anand
- Kavitha as Vishalakshi
- Padmavati as Sumati
- Anusha Prathap as Guest Appearance at Mehandi function
- Sravani as Guest Appearance at Mehandi function
- Vishnu Priya as host Guest Appearance at Reception

== Adaptations ==
Language	Title	Original release	Network(s)	Last aired	Notes
Hindi	Punar Vivaah – Zindagi Milegi Dobara पुनर्विवाह – ज़िंदगी मिलेगी दोबारा	20 February 2012	Zee TV	29 November 2013	Original
Bengali	Kori Khela কড়ি খেলা	8 March 2021	Zee Bangla	29 April 2022	Remake
Telugu	Oohalu Gusagusalade ఊహలు గుసగుసలాడే	10 May 2021	Zee Telugu	8 June 2024	Remake
Tamil	Anbe Sivam அன்பே சிவம்	18 October 2021	Zee Tamil	3 July 2022	Remake
Marathi	Punha Kartavya Aahe पुन्हा कर्तव्य आहे	18 March 2024	Zee Marathi	15 March 2025	Remake
Punjabi	Nava Mod ਨਵਾ ਮੋਡ	2 December 2024	Zee Punjabi	31 May 2025	Remake
