= Anbe Sivam (TV series) =

2021 television series

- Genre: Soap opera
- Directed by: Brahma G Dev
- Starring: Vikram Shri; Kavitha Gowda
- Theme music composer: Ilayavan
- Opening theme: Yaarodu Yaar Seruvaro
- Country of origin: India
- Original language: Tamil
- No. of episodes: 228

Production
- Producers: Sasikumar; Bala Subramaniyan
- Cinematography: S. Gopal
- Production company: My Story Media Works PVT.LIT

Original release
- Network: Zee Tamil
- Release: 18 October 2021 – 3 July 2022

Related
- Punar Vivaah – Zindagi Milegi Dobara

Anbe Sivam (transl. Love is god) is a 2021 Indian-Tamil language television series which premiered from 18 October 2021 and ended on 3 July 2022 aired on Zee Tamil. It stars Vikram Shri and Kavitha Gowda in the lead roles. This show is based on Zee TV's Hindi series Punar Vivaah – Zindagi Milegi Dobara.

== Cast ==
=== Main ===
- Vikram Shri as Adv. Nalla Sivam: Iniya and Oviya's father; Anbu's husband; Arasi's ex-husband
- Raksha Holla (2021–2022) → Kavitha Gowda (2022) as Anbu Selvi (Anbu): Kalai and Bharathi's mother; Sivam's wife; Bhaskar's ex-wife

=== Recurring ===
- Shreeka in a dual role as Iniya and Oviya: Sivam and Arasi's daughter
- Anshita as Kalai: Anbu and Bhaskar's daughter
- Hadeed Kavin as Bharathi: Anbu and Bhaskar's son
- Sabitha Anand as Lakshmi: Shabapathi's wife, Sivam's mother
- Sivan Srinivasan as Shabapathi: Lakshmi's husband, Sivam's father
- Krithika Laddu as Adv. Punnagai Arasi (Arasi): Sivam's ex-wife, Shekar's second wife, Iniya and Oviya's mother
- Varun Udhai as Bhaskar: Anbu's ex-husband, Kayal and Bharathi's father
- Nishma Chengappa as Dr. Malarvizhi (Malar): Kamakshi's daughter, Anbu's sister-in-law, Saravanan's wife
- Vasudeva Krish Madhusudhan as Saravanan: Sivam's brother, Malar's husband
- Priyaa Vishwa (2021–2022) → Bharani Elangovan (2022) as Geetha: Anbu's best friend
- Nathan Shyam as Adv. Shekar: Arasi's second husband
- Rhema Ashok as Poonguzhali (Kuzhali): Nalla Sivam's ex-fiancée, Anbu's friend, later became enemy
- Deepa Shree as Kamakshi: Bhaskar and Malar's mother, Anbu's mother-in-law
- Parthiban as Rajarathnam: Arasi's father
- Isvar Ragunathan as Sugumar

== Production ==
Actor Vikram Shri was selected to portray the lead role as Nalla Sivam. Actress Pavani Reddy was initially selected in the role of Anbu Selvi, but she quit the show before the series release, because of the opportunity of entering Bigg Boss (Tamil season 5). So the team finalised Raksha Holla to portray the role of Anbu Selvi. In January 2022, Raksha Holla was removed from the series by the production team due to her appearance is not fit for the role. So Kavitha Gowda replaced her in the role of Anbu Selvi from episodes 86. Krithika Laddu was selected to play the role of Punnagai Arasi, Nalla Sivam's ex-wife, who is the main antagonist in the show.

== Special and Crossover episodes ==
- Anbe Sivam held a two and half hour non-stop special Sunday episode for Anbu-Sivam Marriage titled 'Anbe Sivam MEGA Thirumana Vaibhavam' on 6 March 2022.
- Anbe Sivam with Rajini series held a one-hour episodes of Super Sanagamam from 23 May to 6 June 2022.

== Adaptations ==
Language	Title	Original release	Network(s)	Last aired	Notes
Hindi	Punar Vivaah – Zindagi Milegi Dobara पुनर्विवाह – ज़िंदगी मिलेगी दोबारा	20 February 2012	Zee TV	29 November 2013	Original
Bengali	Kori Khela কড়ি খেলা	8 March 2021	Zee Bangla	29 April 2022	Remake
Telugu	Oohalu Gusagusalade ఊహలు గుసగుసలాడే	10 May 2021	Zee Telugu	8 June 2024	Remake
Tamil	Anbe Sivam அன்பே சிவம்	18 October 2021	Zee Tamil	3 July 2022	Remake
Marathi	Punha Kartavya Aahe पुन्हा कर्तव्य आहे	18 March 2024	Zee Marathi	15 March 2025	Remake
Punjabi	Nava Mod ਨਵਾ ਮੋਡ	2 December 2024	Zee Punjabi	31 May 2025	Remake
