= Guddan Tumse Na Ho Payega =

2018 Indian television series

- Genre: Drama; Romance
- Created by: Ved Raj Srivastava
- Written by: Manasvi Arya
- Screenplay by: Shweta Bhardwaj
- Story by: Ved Raj; Sudhir Kumar Singh; Aakriti Atreja
- Directed by: Vaibhav Singh; Dharmendra Sharma
- Creative director: Vidhi Tandon
- Starring: Kanika Mann; Nishant Singh Malkani; Savi Thakur
- Theme music composer: Puneet Dixit
- Opening theme: Guddan Tumse Na Ho Payega
- Composer: Puneet Dixit
- Country of origin: India
- Original language: Hindi
- No. of episodes: 595

Production
- Producer: Ved Raj
- Cinematography: Shabir Nayak; Munaaf, Jitendra
- Editors: Sanjay Singh; Manish Upadhyay
- Camera setup: Multi-camera
- Running time: 22 minutes
- Production company: Shoonya Square Productions

Original release
- Network: Zee TV
- Release: 3 September 2018 – 26 January 2021

Guddan Tumse Na Ho Payega (transl. Guddan, You Can't Do It!) is an Indian Hindi television series which aired from 3 September 2018 to 26 January 2021 on Zee TV and is digitally available on the ZEE5. It was produced by Ved Raj for Shoonya Square Productions. The series starred Kanika Mann and Nishant Singh Malkani. After a leap it starred Kanika Mann and Savi Thakur.

== Plot ==
Guddan Gupta, a kind young woman in Indore, marries billionaire chef Akshat Jindal, to save her step-sister's life. Guddan's mother died when she was young; she was raised by her father, Bhushan Gupta, and stepmother Kaushlya Gupta, who dislikes her. Guddan feels guilty for being unable to save her birth mother. Her stepmother criticizes her, saying "Guddan Tumse Na Ho Payega!" (translated, Guddan You Can't Do It!) Guddan's support system is Bhushan and her step-sister, Revati Gupta.

Akshat Jindal lost his first wife, Antara, in a traumatic accident which drove him into a world of his own. An unemotional, no-nonsense person, he is a father figure to his three nephews, the children of his elder brother, Avinash Jindal, and their wives. They love and fear him too.

Guddan marries Akshat; although she annoys him, he protects and supports her. She slowly develops self-confidence, and he begins to feel emotions he does not understand. Earlier in their marriage, Akshat thought that Guddan married him for his money; later, he begins to appreciate her innocence and kindness. During their wedding reception, he learns that Kaushlya deceitfully arranged their marriage. After realizing that he had misunderstood Guddan, Akshat begins to trust her and appreciates her care for his mother.

Police officer Vikram Rawat, Antara's elder brother, forced Guddan to stay with Akshat to collect evidence that Akshat killed Antara. Although Guddan hides her knowledge about Vikram's intentions from Akshat and the rest of the family, she defends Akshat when Vikram arrests him. Akshat learns that Guddan was staying at his house to gather evidence against him, and breaks her mangala sutra.

Akshat's younger brother, Angad Jindal, is mentally ill and was believed to be partially responsible for Antara's death. Akshat hides Angad from the police, and is annoyed when Guddan brings Angad back to Akshat's house.

The entire Jindal family celebrates Holi in Goa. Akshat tries to replace Guddan's mangala sutra; however, she wants him to do so when he accepts her with his heart and not from social pressure. After Angad stabs Akshat, Akshat accepts Guddan wholeheartedly as his wife.

Antara, thought to be dead, reappears and tries to destroy Akshat and Guddan's relationship as Guddan's faith in him is shaken. Angad is killed by Antara's henchmen. Eventually, Antara’s crimes are revealed and she is arrested. On Akshat and Guddan's honeymoon (arranged by Angad), AJ shoots her and she falls from a cliff.

When AJ sees Guddan, he is shocked. Revati has married Inspector Parv Singh. Guddan asks AJ why he shot her. He says that he wanted to keep her from learning about Revati's hatred of her, which Guddan knows was fueled by Antara. Guddan confronts Revati, who wants to destroy Guddan and Akshat's happiness as she blames them for Angad’s death, whom she loved.

Alisha (Akshat and Antara's daughter) appears at the Jindal house during a pooja and refuses to accept Guddan as her stepmother. A devastated Guddan leaves Akshat, although they still love each other. They reconcile some time later and Alisha also starts to love and accept Guddan as her mother. Guddan begins a relationship with AJ, and believes that she is pregnant with their child. Antara kills Alisha and later tries to kill Guddan, and is arrested. When AJ thinks that Guddan has aborted the baby because he is working with Antara, he marries Antara in revenge and abandons Guddan. The couple get separated.

Guddan is a successful actress in Mumbai. In Indore, Akshat has become an impoverished alcoholic; Antara runs the house. Guddan comes to Indore to promote her film, and she and Akshat meet again. Akshat and Guddan meet several times leading them to clear their misunderstandings. They reunite and consummate their marriage, and after some time, Guddan is revealed to be pregnant. Antara is defeated as well.

The family enjoys good times. Guddan gives birth to a baby girl, and they name her Choti Guddan. Then Avinash and Ganga arrive; Akshat's elder brother and his wife. Dadi initially refuses to forgive them for deserting their family, but Guddan makes Dadi forgive them. Avinash and Ganga pretend to be nice in the beginning, but soon show their true colors when they kidnap Choti Guddan and try to usurp the wealth. Akshat and Guddan rescue their baby and Ganga and Avinash are killed, but are mortally wounded as well. Guddan and Akshat talk about how they met, fell in love, and united. In the end, they both say l love you to one another. Akshat falls of the cliff and dies, but Guddan survives, though she loses her memory.

Choti Guddan is an adult and runs Akshat's restaurant. Agastya joins Guddan as her manager and steals her restaurant for his mother, Pushpa. Agastya and Choti Guddan get married under unforeseen circumstances. Later, it is revealed that he is Chikoo. After some time, Guddan regains her memory and comes back and fights for her daughter, but the in-laws of Choti Guddan think she is mentally ill, which Agastya refuses to believe. Agastya and Choti Guddan realise they love each other, and reunite. Pushpa reforms and Agastya’s obsessive lover, Niya is arrested. It is shown that Guddan is missing Akshat and talking to his photo that hangs on the wall.

The show ends with Guddan telling her fan viewers that she loves them and will come back to remind them if they do forget her. She gives her last goodbye.

== Cast ==
=== Main ===
- Kanika Mann as in dual roles as
  - Guddan Gupta Jindal: Sumati and Bhushan's daughter (2018–2021)
  - Jr. Guddan Jindal Birla: Guddan and Akshat's daughter (2020–2021)
- Nishant Singh Malkani as Akshat "AJ" Jindal: Kalpana's second son (2018–2020)
- Savi Thakur as Agastya Birla: Pushpa's son (2020–2021)

=== Recurring ===
- Shweta Mahadik as Durga Chaubey Jindal: Rocky's sister (2018–2020)
- Sehrish Ali as Lakshmi Jindal: Vardaan's wife (2018–2020)
- Rashmi Gupta as Saraswati Singh Jindal: Parv's sister (2018–2020)
- Dalljiet Kaur as Antara Rawat: Vikram's sister (2019–2020)
- Rehaan Roy as Police Inspector Parv Singh: Saraswati's brother (2018–2020)
- Lalit Singh as Goon: Restaurant from Guddan (2020)
- Daljeet Soundh as Kalpana Jindal: Avinash, Angad and Akshat's mother (2018–2020)
- Srishti Mitra as Revati Gupta: Bhushan and Kaushalya's daughter (2018–2020)
- Anuj Kohli as Kishore Jindal: Avinash's eldest son (2018–2020)
- Mayank Verma as Vardaan Jindal: Avinash's youngest son (2018–2020)
- Trishna Vivek as Kaushalya Gupta: Bhushan's second wife (2018–2020)
- Subhashish Chakraborty as Bhushan Gupta: Sumati's widower (2018–2020)
- Sikandar Kharbanda as Avinash Jindal: Kalpana's eldest son (2020)
- Neha Yadav as Ganga Jindal: Avinash's second wife (2020)
- Jatin Shah as Vikram Rawat: Antara's brother (2018–2019)
- Anjali Ujawane as Shanti Gupta (2019)
- Garima Dixit as Siddhi Singh: Parv's wife (2018–2019)
- Manan Joshi as Rocky Chaubey: Durga's brother (2019)
- Achal Tankwal as Angad Jindal: Kalpana's youngest son (2019)
- Palak Jain as Alisha Jindal (formerly Goel): Antara and Akshat's daughter (2019) (Dead)
- Pawan Shankar as Vikrant Goel: Alisha's ex-husband (2019)
- Anahita Jhanbaksh as Pushpa Birla: Agastya and Aarushi's mother (2020–2021)
- Nirmala Chandra as Sonalika Birla: Agastya and Arushi's aunt (2020-2021)
- Drashti Bhanushali as Rashi Birla (2020–2021)
- Pratham Kunwar as Mani Birla: Sonalika's son (2020–2021)
- Abhinandan Jindal as Aarav Jindal: Durga and Kishore's son (2020–2021)
- Shalini Mahal as Aarushi Birla: Pushpa's daughter (2020–2021)
- Maera Mishra as Niya: Agastya's girlfriend (2020–2021)
- Saurabbh Ravi Dutta as Reporter (2019)
- Piyush Singh as Vinay: Antara's Assistant (2019)

== Production ==
In January 2020, the series timeline advanced four years. Its production and broadcast were halted indefinitely in late March 2020 due to the COVID-19 outbreak in India. Filming of television series and films was halted on 19 March. It was expected to resume on 1 April, but could not; the series' remaining episodes were broadcast on 24 March. Production resumed on 28 June 2020, with broadcasts scheduled to resume on 13 July.

In April 2020, a special episode was filmed at the cast members' homes. On 22 June 2020, Guddan Tumse Na Ho Payega began streaming on the ZEE5 digital platform as lockdown-special episodes in which the cast reminisced about past episodes and discussed their lockdown routines.

In May 2020, amid rumors that Nishant Singh Malkani was leaving the series, the time jump was cited as a factor. Malkani said, "Because post leap they will be showing a story of a young girl who is supposedly Guddan and my daughter. Since Kanika (Mann) will be playing the daughter's role as well, it makes sense for her but does not leave much scope for me. I won't be able to play a 50-year-old father and they also don't want me to play that at this age. So it is a mutual decision," Producer Ved Raj said about the time jump, "This decision has nothing to do with the lockdown. We had planned to introduce a time leap and a new track much before that. We realized that there was nothing left to explore in the original story. The new storyline seems promising. It's just that the plan couldn't be executed earlier because everything came to a halt owing to the lockdown." The series' audience was unhappy with the time shift and Malkani's departure, expressing their displeasure in emails and on social media. Savi Thakur, known for his role in Porus, joined the cast in August 2020 as male lead Agastya Birla in the new timeline.

== Adaptations ==
Language	Title	Original release	Network(s)	Last aired	Notes
Hindi	Guddan Tumse Na Ho Payega गुड्डन तुमसे ना हो पायेगा	3 September 2018	Zee TV	26 January 2021	Original
Telugu	Hitler Gari Pellam హిట్లర్ గారి పెళ్ళాం	17 August 2020	Zee Telugu	22 January 2022	Remake
Tamil	Thirumathi Hitler திருமதி ஹிட்லர்	14 December 2020	Zee Tamil	8 January 2022	Remake
Malayalam	Mrs. Hitler മിസിസ്. ഹിറ്റ്ലർ	19 April 2021	Zee Keralam	11 June 2023	Remake
Kannada	Hitler Kalyana ಹಿಟ್ಲರ್ ಕಲ್ಯಾಣ	9 August 2021	Zee Kannada	14 March 2024	Remake
Bengali	Tomar Khola Hawa তোমার খোলা হাওয়া	12 December 2022	Zee Bangla	29 July 2023	Remake
Odia	Tu Khara Mun Chhai ତୁ ଖରା ମୁଁ ଛାଇ	2 January 2023	Zee Sarthak	Ongoing	Remake
Marathi	Navri Mile Hitlerla नवरी मिळे हिटलरला	18 March 2024	Zee Marathi	25 May 2025	Remake
Punjabi	Heer Tey Tedhi Kheer ਹੀਰ ਤੈ ਟੇਢੀ ਖੀਰ	1 April 2024	Zee Punjabi	29 March 2025	Remake

== Soundtrack ==
Guddan Tumse Na Ho Payega

Soundtrack album by Puneet Dixit
- Length: 35:31
- Language: Hindi
- Label: Zee Music Company
- Producer: Ved Raj

Guddan Tumse Na Ho Payega's soundtrack was composed by Puneet Dixit.

No.	Title	Lyrics	Singer(s)	Length
1.	"Guddan Tumse Naa Ho Paayega"	Mansvi Arya	Rakesh Maini, Shuchita Vyas, Vini Gora and Chitrlekha Sen	3:55
2.	"Lakeerein"	Abhendra Kumar Upadhyay	Esha Gaur and Puneet Dixit	5:00
3.	"Ishq Nahi Aasaan"	Abhendra Kumar Upadhyay	Sonu Nigam, Esha Gaur, Shashi Sumeet Mittal and Puneet Dixit	6:30
4.	"Tum Ho"	Abhendra Kumar Upadhyay	Esha Gaur and Puneet Dixit	6:39
5.	"Sang Hoon Tere"	Abhendra Kumar Upadhyay	Asit Tripathi and Esha Gaur	6:39
6.	"Chaina"	Priyanka R Bala	Vipin Aneja and Puneet Dixit	4:12
7.	"Lakeerein 2.0"	Abhendra Kumar Upadhyay	Puneet Dixit	3:56
