= Kanni (2024 Marathi-language film) =

- Theatrical release poster
- Directed by: Sameer Joshi
- Written by: Sameer Joshi
- Produced by: Amit Bhargad; Gagan Meshram; Vaibhav Bhor; Sunny Rajani
- Starring: Hruta Durgule; Shubhankar Tawde; Ajinkya Raut; Vallari Viraj; Rishi Manohar
- Cinematography: Amol Solunke
- Edited by: Aniket Kale
- Music by: Angel Roman; Vishal Shelke
- Production companies: Naughty Penguins Entertainment; Beyond Imagination Films; Chrome Films Ltd
- Distributed by: AA Films
- Release date: 8 March 2024 (Maharashtra)
- Country: India
- Language: Marathi

Kanni is a 2024 Indian Marathi-language romantic comedy-drama film directed and written by Sameer Joshi and produced by Amit Bhargad, Gagan Meshram, Vaibhav Bhor and Sunny Rajani. The film stars Hruta Durgule, Shubhankar Tawde, Ajinkya Raut, Vallari Viraj, and Rishi Manohar in the leading roles.

== Plot ==
In the heart of London, Kalyani, a young woman from rural Maharashtra, India. After losing her job, she concocts a risky scheme with her housemates to marry a British citizen for financial stability. As bonds are strained and relationships jeopardized, Kalyani discovers that genuine success and fulfillment come from confronting inner fears. She learns that the road to a meaningful existence is paved with resilience rather than precarious shortcuts.

== Cast ==
- Hruta Durgule as Kalyani Revandikar
- Ajinkya Raut as Nihal Hooda
- Shubhankar Tawde as Soham Kalsekar
- Rishi Manohar as Bhushan
- Vallari Viraj as Neha
- Deidre Rose as Vicky
- Elloise Thomson as Nicole
- Sanjay Batra as Neighbour
- Rubina Hula as Fufi

== Production ==
The principal photography commenced in London in October 2022.

== Release ==
The film was theatrically released on 8 March 2024 throughout Maharashtra, coinciding International Women's Day.

== Reception ==
Anub George of The Times of India rated 3 stars out of 5 stars and wrote "the film's ending is fairly predictable, it does put a smile on your face, making this a great film to watch with your family. Expect laughter, drama, romance, some tears and a whole lot of fun too." Sanjay Ghaware of Lokmat rated 2.5 stars out of 5 stars and wrote: "the film has its strengths, such as strong performances and meaningful dialogues, there are areas where it could improve, particularly in pacing and screenplay humor."
