= Main Ladega =

- Official poster of Main Ladega
- Directed by: Gaurav Rana
- Written by: Akash Pratap Singh
- Produced by: Akshay Bhagwanji Pinakin Bhakta
- Starring: Akash Pratap Singh; Vallari Viraj; Gandharv Dewan; Ashwath Bhatt; Jyoti Gauba
- Cinematography: Lucky Yadav
- Edited by: Satya Sharma
- Production company: Kathakaar Films
- Release date: 26 April 2024 (India)
- Country: India
- Language: Hindi

Main Ladega is a 2024 Hindi-language sport drama film written by Akash Pratap Singh and directed by Gaurav Rana. The film was produced by Akshay Bhagwanji and Pinakin Bhakta under the banner of Kathakaar Films. The film features Akash Pratap Singh, Vallari Viraj, Gandharv Dewan, Ashwath Bhatt, and Jyoti Gauba as lead characters.

== Cast ==
- Akash Pratap Singh
- Gandharv Dewan
- Vallari Viraj
- Jyoti Gauba
- Ashwath Bhatt

== Release ==
The film was released theatrically on 26 April 2024.

== Reception ==
Dhaval Roy of The Times of India rated the film 3 stars out of 5 stars and wrote "'Main Ladega' follows the familiar underdog-to-hero path, but its sincerity shines through. While predictable, the film's emotional core and Akash's journey resonate." A critic from Times Now rated the film 3 stars out of 5 stars and wrote "Main Ladega is a powerful testament to the human spirit, offering a compelling narrative that resonates long after the credits roll."

Riya Sharma of DNA rated the film 3.5 stars out of 5 stars and wrote "Overall, Main Ladega is a gripping and heartfelt film that resonates long after the credits roll. It is a testament to the resilience of the human spirit and the power of hope to overcome even the greatest of obstacles."
