= Mooh Boli Shaadi =

- Genre: Romance; Comedy; Drama
- Created by: Sumeet Hukamchand Mittal; Shashi Mittal
- Written by: Zama Habib
- Starring: See below
- Composers: Dony Hazarika; Udbhav Ojha
- Country of origin: India
- Original language: Hindi
- No. of seasons: 1
- No. of episodes: 79

Production
- Producers: Shashi Mittal; Sumeet Hukamchand Mittal
- Production location: Mumbai
- Running time: 20 minutes
- Production company: Shashi Sumeet Productions

Original release
- Network: Sony Entertainment Television
- Release: February 23 – June 19, 2015

Mooh Boli Shaadi (transl. Fake marriage) is an Indian television romantic-drama soap opera which aired from 23 February 2015 to 19 June 2015 on Sony TV. Mooh Boli Shaadi is about the love story of a rich girl called Anmol and a middle-class boy named Nikhil and how they end up marrying secretly only to land in a pool of conjugal troubles.

== Plot ==
Anmol is the only daughter of rich businessman Ratan Singh and has been brought up as a pampered daughter. Nikhil is a young boy who Anmol becomes attracted to and soon discovers he is the son of their next door neighbour, a priest named Ashok Tiwari. While Nikhil and Anmol gradually fall in love, their fathers become sworn enemies constantly sparring on issues and trying to show each other down. Both Nikhil and Anmol hold back their feelings seeing the enmity between their families

Anmol's family fixes her engagement with Sushant, the son of his business associate. Nikhil confronts Anmol and she finally relents. They hug, reaffirming their love for each other and marry on the spot. They decide to keep it hidden from their families till Nikhil can become financially independent. They continue to meet and spend time secretly as Anmol confides in her cousin sister Nidhi about her marriage. Anmol's aunt Neelam finds out about her relationship with Nikhil and convinces Ratan Singh to get Anmol married to Sushant without telling her. Anmol believes she will be getting engaged but discovers her family plans to get her married instead. Meanwhile, Sushant and his father have decided on the marriage only to get Ratan Singh's money since they have gone bankrupt and are in debt.

At her wedding ceremony, Nikhil finally finds out and interrupts the ceremony. They declare their love and as Nikhil's father insults Anmol, they reveal to everyone that they are married and beg for acceptance but Ratan Singh throws Anmol out of the house and breaks all relations with her. Ashok also throws Nikhil out of his house. Meanwhile, Neelam manipulates the situation and gets Sushant married to her daughter Nidhi thinking he is from a rich family. Nikhil and Anmol are given shelter by his friend Kishor and his mother who live in a small house. Kishor's mother is sweet to them but takes away Anmol's jewellery. When Nikhil finds out, he gets the jewellery back and leaves the house. Nidhi finds out about Sushant and physically threatens her to stay quiet.

Ratan Singh tries to bribe Nikhil to divorce Anmol but he refuses. Ratan Singh and Ashok Tiwari team up to try and drive a wedge between their children. Ashok invites Nikhil and Anmol to return to his house. Ratan Singh hires Nikhil's old acquaintance Payal to work for him and he and Ashok try to make Anmol think Nikhil and Payal are getting close. Nikhil sees Sushant mistreating Nidhi and wants to tell the family but Nidhi protects Sushant for the sake of her family. Creating an argument, Ratan and Ashok instigate Anmol and Nikhil against each other. Nikhil and Anmol pretend they have committed suicide to make their fathers realise the error of their ways. In the end it is revealed that Sushant has had a change of heart and informed Nikhil and Anmol about their fathers' plan. He promises to be a better husband to Nidhi as both families finally accept Nikhil and Anmol as the show ends.

== Cast ==
- Zalak Desai as Anmol Singh
- Fahad Ali as Nikhil Tiwari
- Darshan Jariwala as Pandit Ashok Tiwari, Nikhil's father
- Meghan Jadhav as Akhil Tiwari
- Bobby Parvez as Ratan Singh, Anmol's father
- Kajal Srivastav as Nidhi, Anmol's cousin sister
- Nasir Khan as Nidhi's father
- Ghanshyam Srivastva as Satpal Chaiwaala
- Priyanka Chahar Choudhary as Seema
