= Punar Vivaah – Zindagi Milegi Dobara =

Indian Hindi drama TV series

- Created by: Sumeet Hukamchand Mittal; Shashi Mittal
- Written by: Shobhit Jaiswal; Anil Nagpal; Seema Mantri; Usha Dixit; Saurabh Tewari; Gautam Hedge
- Directed by: Manish Khandelwal; Hemant Prabhu; Ravi Raj, Arvind Gupta
- Creative director: Karishmaa Chandna
- Starring: Gurmeet Choudhary; Kratika Sengar
- Opening theme: Punar Vivah by Kamaal Khan
- Country of origin: India
- Original language: Hindi
- No. of seasons: 2

Production
- Producers: Shashi Mittal; Sumeet Hukamchand Mittal
- Cinematography: Sudesh Kotian; Navneet Beohar
- Editor: Jay B Ghadiali
- Camera setup: Multi-camera
- Production company: Shashi Sumeet Productions

Original release
- Network: Zee TV
- Release: 20 February 2012 – 17 May 2013

Related
- Punar Vivah – Ek Nayi Umeed

Punar Vivah – Zindagi Milegi Dobara (transl. Remarriage Will Give You Life – Again) is an Indian soap opera that aired on Zee TV from 20 February 2012, replacing Bhagonwali-Baante Apni Taqdeer till 17 May 2013. The show was set in the city of Bhopal and revolved around characters Yash and Aarti. The first season concluded on 17 May 2013 and a second season titled Punar Vivah – Ek Nayi Umeed with new lead characters and a new storyline, replaced it from 20 May 2013.

== Plot ==
It is the story of two individuals, Yash and Aarti. Based in Bhopal, Yash Scindia is a wealthy widower living with his two daughters Payal and Palak. Aarti is a divorcée and lives with her son Ansh. Yash is a wedding planner.

Aarti's in-laws and Yash's family want the two lonely hearts to get united in marriage. Aarti's in-laws decide to let Yash's family believe Aarti has been widowed like Yash. Yash and Aarti get married for the well-being of their children and Aarti soon makes place for herself in Yash's joint family. Yash, however, continues to live with memories of his first wife Arpita. On a trip to Mumbai, Yash and Aarti come closer and Aarti confesses to him that she has fallen in love with him. Soon, Yash cuts short the vacation and they return home where Yash declares he has no relationship with Aarti and refuses to speak to her. After several days, Aarti is still clueless till she faints and is informed she is pregnant. She recalls that after consuming bhaang at a temple, they consummated their marriage and Yash feels guilty for betraying his former wife and blames Aarti. Aarti finally confronts Yash and refuses to accept that the act of consummation was one-sided. She starts living with him again for the sake of their families but maintains a distance from him and hides her pregnancy from everyone.

Complications arise in Aarti's pregnancy but she chooses to leave with her son Ansh and boards a bus. Meanwhile, Yash's aunt discovers Aarti's pregnancy and the entire family finds out but only after Aarti has left. She meets with an accident and she and Ansh reach the hospital with help from her first husband Prashant. Yash sets out looking for her and Prashant discovers that Aarti is married to Yash. Yash and Aarti finally reunite at a mazaar and Yash and Aarti return home with Ansh as Prashant looks on. Meanwhile, Yash's younger brother Prateek and his wife Paridhi continuously argue about Paridhi's work hours as she goes off on shoots and her disregard for the family. Paridhi gets drunk for a shoot and sleeps with her producer who starts blackmailing her. In an altercation, Paridhi inadvertently hits him and he dies. Paridhi confides in her mother who tells her to stay quiet about all the events.

An ailing Prashant returns to his parents but is diagnosed with advanced stage cancer and requires a bone marrow transplant from his biological son Ansh. Prashant's mother Shobha is forced to ask for Aarti's help and they manage to get Ansh's bone marrow for Prashant's treatment whilst keeping it a secret from Yash and his family. Prashant is cured and refuses to leave home even as Aarti finally tells Yash about him and how while she was pregnant with Ansh, Prashant selfishly left her for another woman. Yash falls in love with Aarti but believes she would want to return to her first love Prashant but Aarti sets out to prove that she loves only Yash even as Prashant decides to get her back. Prashant's aunt exposes Aarti's past before the Scindias who are shocked and unforgiving at first till Yash defends her. Aarti and Yash are banished to another part of the house and Yash's father instructs the family to sever ties with them and their children.

Prashant decides to plot against Yash and Aarti to separate them. However, eventually, Yash and Aarti reunite with the family and Yash brings Akash to the family. This creates tensions and Gayatri starts hating Yash who is revealed to be Suraj Pratap's son with his other wife Radha and was swapped at birth with Akash who is actually Gayatri's biological son. Akash and his wife Ishita have designs on the Scindia wealth and influence Gayatri who disowns Yash. Suraj Pratap instead, names Yash as the sole heir to his wealth. A fight breaks out between Akash and Yash and Gayatri is grievously injured. At the hospital, she finally realises her mistake and apologises to Yash and Suraj Pratap as she dies in Yash's arms.

A month later, Akash and Ishita manage to turn the family against Radha with only Yash and Aarti supporting her. They make Suraj Pratap and the family realise her value and Suraj Pratap decides to marry her to give her her rightful place. After he gets into trouble with his thug friends, Akash has a change of heart when Aarti rescues him and saves his life.

New complications arise after Aarti and Yash's son Aayu is born but someone kidnaps him soon after. The culprit is revealed to be Ishita. Ishita becomes obsessed with Yash creating problems between him and Aarti. They don't talk to each other for months after losing Aayu. Aayu returns to the family as an orphan who is adopted by Prateek and Paridhi. Aarti feels a strange connection with the baby and finds comfort in him. Aarti soon discovers the truth about Ishita and together with Yash, she gets Aayu back; however, seeing Paridhi's sad face, Aarti and Yash decide to give Aayu to Prateek and Paridhi. Ishita comes back and kidnaps Aayu again. However, Yash saves Aayu and gets Ishita arrested as the show ends. The Scindia family introducing the new characters for Season 2.

== Cast ==
=== Main ===
- Kratika Sengar Dheer as Aarti Yash Sindhia – Yash's wife
- Gurmeet Choudhary as Yash Sindhia – Suraj Pratap and Radha's son

=== Recurring ===
- Sarwar Ahuja / Vineet Raina as Prashant Dubey – Aarti's ex-husband
- Geeta Tyagi as Shobha Dubey – Prashant's mother
- Amit Singh Thakur as Satyendra Dubey – Prashant's father
- Divyam Dama as Ansh Sindhia – Aarti and Prashant's son
- Palak Dey as Palak Sindhia – Yash and Arpita's elder daughter
- Dhriti Mehta as Payal Sindhia – Yash and Arpita's younger daughter
- Chetan Pandit as Suraj Pratap Sindhia – Radha and Gayatri's husband
- Zahida Parveen as Gayatri Sindhia – Suraj Pratap's first wife
- Dolly Minhas as Radha Sindhia – Suraj Pratap's second wife
- Pallavi Rao / Ananya Khare as Maaya – Suraj's sister
- Rakesh Kukreti as Pankaj Sindhia – Suraj and Gayatri's eldest son
- Samragyi Nema as Vidhi Sindhia – Pankaj's wife
- Dishank Arora as Prateek Sindhia – Suraj Pratap and Gayatri's youngest son
- Leena Jumani as Paridhi Khanna Sindhia – Prateek's wife
- Akshay Dogra as Akash Sindhia – Suraj Pratap and Gayatri's second son
- Heena Parmar as Ishita Sindhia – Akash's wife
- Amita Udgata as Taai – Prashant's aunt
- Shweta Munshi as Arpita Yash Sindhia - Yash's ex-wife; Palak and Payal's biological mother
- Pyumori Mehta Ghosh as Arpita's mother
- Roma Bali as Mrs. Khanna – Paridhi's mother
- Shagufta Ali as Vimla – Mohan's mother
- Anshul Trivedi as Mohan

=== Guest ===
- Additi Gupta as a dancer in the bachelors' party
- Neelu Vaghela as Santosh Rathi from Diya Aur Baati Hum
- Rupal Patel as Kokila Modi from Saath Nibhana Saathiya
- Hiten Tejwani as Manav Deshmukh from Pavitra Rishta
- Ankita Lokhande as Archana Deshmukh from Pavitra Rishta
- Asha Negi as Purvi Deshmukh Kirloskar from Pavitra Rishta
- Rithvik Dhanjani as Arjun Kirloskar from Pavitra Rishta
- Kamal Khan (Singer)
- Karanvir Bohra
- Rubina Dilaik
- Rashami Desai
- Mouli Ganguly
- Vibha Chibber as Mrs. Bindeshwari Kaushik from Mrs. Kaushik Ki Paanch Bahuein
- Savita Prabhune as Sulochna Karanjkar from Pavitra Rishta
- Kruttika Desai Khan as Bharti Gandhi from Ram Milaye Jodi
- Urvashi Dholakia as Savvy the match maker from Mrs. Kaushik Ki Paanch Bahuein
- Ragini Nandwani as Lovely from Mrs. Kaushik Ki Paanch Bahuein
- Mukul Harish as Kartik Mrs. Kaushik Ki Paanch Bahuein
- Mitali Nag as Krishna Raj from Afsar Bitiya
- Kinshuk Mahajan as Pintu Singh from Afsar Bitiya
- Kunal Khemu to promote Blood Money
- Amrita Puri to promote Blood Money

== Adaptations ==
Language	Title	Original release	Network(s)	Last aired	Notes
Hindi	Punar Vivaah – Zindagi Milegi Dobara पुनर्विवाह – ज़िंदगी मिलेगी दोबारा	20 February 2012	Zee TV	29 November 2013	Original
Bengali	Kori Khela কড়ি খেলা	8 March 2021	Zee Bangla	29 April 2022	Remake
Telugu	Oohalu Gusagusalade ఊహలు గుసగుసలాడే	10 May 2021	Zee Telugu	8 June 2024	Remake
Tamil	Anbe Sivam அன்பே சிவம்	18 October 2021	Zee Tamil	3 July 2022	Remake
Marathi	Punha Kartavya Aahe पुन्हा कर्तव्य आहे	18 March 2024	Zee Marathi	15 March 2025	Remake
Punjabi	Nava Mod ਨਵਾ ਮੋਡ	2 December 2024	Zee Punjabi	31 May 2025	Remake
