= Sajan Ghar Jaana Hai =

Indian television series

- Genre: Indian soap opera
- Created by: Sumeet Hukamchand Mittal; Shashi Mittal
- Written by: Sumeet Hukamchand Mittal
- Directed by: Shashi Mittal
- Starring: Kunwar Aziz, Neha Saxena, Barkha Bisht Sengupta, Kunal Bhatia, Zalak Desai
- Opening theme: Alka Yagnik
- Country of origin: India
- Original language: Hindi
- No. of episodes: 233

Production
- Producers: Shashi Mittal; Sumeet Hukamchand Mittal
- Cinematography: Deepak Malwankar & Sudesh Kotian
- Editor: Jay B Ghadiali
- Running time: 24 minutes
- Production company: Shashi Sumeet Productions

Original release
- Network: STAR Plus
- Release: 5 August 2009 – 25 June 2010

Sajan Ghar Jaana Hai (Hindi: सजन घर जाना है) is an Indian television series that aired on STAR Plus. The series premiered on 5 August 2009 and ended on 25 June 2010. It was produced by directors Sumeet Hukamchand Mittal and Shashi Mittal. It was replaced by Rajan Shahi 's Chand Chupa Badal Mein.

== Plot ==
Sajan Ghar Jana Hai revolves around the story of a simple and beautiful girl named Dhaani, the only daughter of Sudha Devi - a widow. Dhaani lives with her widowed mother and makes bridal dolls as a profession. Ambar, who was adopted by Badri Narayan Raghuvanshi, meets Dhaani accidentally and falls in love with her at first sight.

Eventually, Amber and Dhaani get married with the blessing of their elders. But at the time of bidaai, after learning that her mother belongs to a lower caste, Dhaani's father-in-law refuses to accept her into his family. Unfortunately, Dhaani sacrifices her love and Amber and Sarla are married due to Dhaani's threat to Amber of killing herself.

Soon, on Ambika's condition, Dhaani is forced to move into the Raghuvanshi house as Sakhi, the maid, in order to save Sarla. Slowly, Sarla and Dhaani begin sharing a healthy bond of friendship. Dhaani helps the immature Sarla to become a better daughter-in-law in the Raghuvanshi household. Dhaani continues to live as a maid for a while, but is happy with Amber and Sarla's company. Finally, how Amber and Dhaani reunite despite many troubles forms the crux of the story.

== Cast ==
=== Main ===
- Kunal Bhatia as Ambar Raghuvanshi: Badri's adoptive son; Dhaani's husband
- Neha Saxena/Barkha Sengupta as Dhaani Ambar Raghuvanshi / Sakhi: Ambar's first wife
- Zalak Desai as Sarla Ambar Raghuvanshi : Amber's second wife; Avinash's sister

=== Recurring ===
- Kunwar Aziz Utsahi as Badrinarayan Raghuvanshi: Amber's adoptive father
- Gunn Kansara as Sudha: Dhani's mother
- Kalyani Trivedi / Neelima Panjrekar as Bhagwati Raghuvanshi: Amber's aunt
- Damini Joshi as Kamali
- Khushi Sharma as Chunri
- Abigail Jain as Madhu
- Avantika Shetty as Gauri Sumer Raghuvanshi
- Leena Prabhu as Uma Badri Narayan Raghuvanshi
- Vidya Sinha as Bui: a senior maidservant of the Raghuvanshis
- Rakesh Mohar as Sumer Raghuvanshi
- Varun Khandelwal as Ambika Bhavani: Robin Hood-like bandit
- Jasveer Kaur as Roop: a woman who loves Ambika Bhavani
- Sunila Karambelkar as Shakuntala- scheming relative of the Raghuvanshis
- Nigaar Khan as Mohini - Daughter-in-law of Shakuntala
- Bharat as Chandu - Shakuntala's son

== Production ==
The series was filmed at Film City, Mumbai. Barkha Sengupta replaced Nexa Saxena as Dhaani in March 2010.

== Reception ==
The Indian Express stated the show as an average one reviewing, "Sajan Ghar Jana Hai, though has a fresh cast, yet it fails when it comes to weaving an engrossing tale. At times, the goings-on in the show are not engrossing. Also, what mars the show is its slow pace. Some fine editing should do the trick! Kunal Bhatia performs in a restrained manner. Neha Saxena despite having a pretty screen presence fails to look believable in her role."
