= Tu Khara Mun Chhai =

Indian Odia language TV series

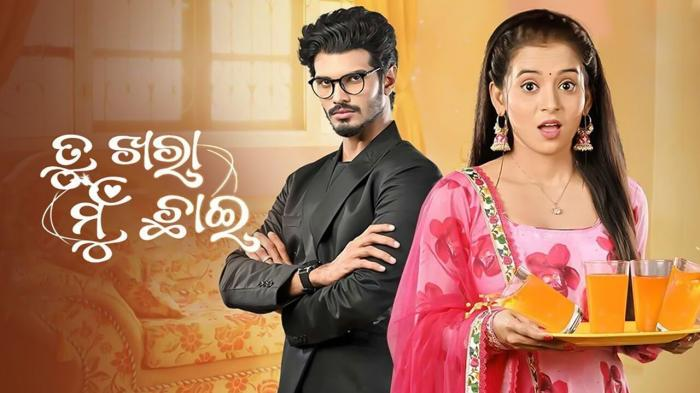
- Genre: Romance, Drama
- Starring: See below
- Country of origin: India
- Original language: Odia
- No. of episodes: 1190

Production
- Producer: Ashok Palit
- Production locations: Bhubaneswar, Odisha
- Camera setup: Multi-camera
- Running time: 22 minutes
- Production company: Akshay Parija Productions

Original release
- Network: Zee Sarthak
- Release: 2 January 2023 – present

Related
- Guddan Tumse Na Ho Payega

Tu Khara Mun Chhai (transl. You are the light, I am the shadow) is an Indian Odia language television series which airing on Zee Sarthak. It premiered from 2 January 2023 and stars Smrutirekha Rana and Rashmi Ranjan Panda in the leading roles. The series is an official remake of Zee TV's Hindi TV series Guddan Tumse Na Ho Payega.

== Plot ==
The story revolves around Manini, a lively and clumsy girl who aspires to be an actress and has dreams of making it in the entertainment industry. On the other side of town, AJ, aka Abhimanyu, a perfectionist and a wealthy businessesman, manages his vast family empire while trying to meet the demands of his extensive family. AJ and Manini's paths unexpectedly cross one day due to a series of comedy errors that lead to an accidental marriage, which leaves both of them stunned. Soon, they struggle to get along due to their new responsibilities and contrasting personalities.

== Cast ==
=== Main ===
- Smrutirekha Rana as Mani Jaydev
- Rashmi Ranjan Panda as Abhinab Jaydev

=== Recurring ===
- Tanmay Kumar
- Saurav Kumar
- Priyanka Mohapatra
- Arundhati Devika
- Sandhya Rani Behara
- Somya Kanungo
- Rupali Mishra
- M Suman Kumar
