= Tomar Khola Hawa =

Indian Bengali language drama

- Genre: Drama; Family
- Created by: Sumeet Hukamchand Mittal; Shashi Mittal
- Story by: Prashant Rathi; Dialogues; Pranita
- Directed by: Babu Banik
- Starring: See below
- Country of origin: India
- Original language: Bengali
- No. of episodes: 183

Production
- Producers: Sumeet Hukamchand Mittal; Shashi Mittal
- Camera setup: Multi camera
- Running time: 22 minutes
- Production company: Shashi Sumeet Productions

Original release
- Network: Zee Bangla
- Release: 12 December 2022 – 29 July 2023

Related
- Guddan Tumse Na Ho Payega

Tomar Khola Hawa (transl. Your Open Air) is an Indian Bengali language drama television series which aired on Zee Bangla. It premiered on 12 December 2022. It stars Swastika Dutta and Subhankar Saha in lead roles. The show is produced under the banner of Shashi Sumeet Productions. It is inspired by Hindi television series Guddan Tumse Na Ho Payega.

== Cast ==
=== Main ===
- Swastika Dutta as Jhilmil Roy
- Subhankar Saha as Abir Roy

=== Recurring ===
- Srabanti Banerjee as Ahona Mitra : Abir's ex-wife
- Kheyali Dastidar as Chaya Roy : Abir's mother
- Arpita Mukherjee as Shivani Roy : Arjo's wife
- Tathagata Mukherjee as Arjo Roy : Abir's eldest son
- Diya Chakrabarty as Chaitali Roy : Dripto's wife
- Debanjan Chattopadhay as Dripto Roy : Abir's elder son
- Raima Sengupta as Sreeja Roy : Pablo's wife
- Sourav Das as Pablo Roy : Abir's youngest son
- Debnath Chattopadhyay as Bhuson : Jhilmil's father
- Somjita Bhattacharya as Padma : Jhilmil's step mother
- Biswabasu Biswas as Sagor : Chaitali's brother
- Sangita Ghosh as Tithi : Drpito's ex-girlfriend
- Averi Singha Roy as Kaberi : Sreeja's mother
- Ishani Sengupta as Trisha: Sreeja's sister
- Arghya Mitra as Abir's friend
