= Kusum Dola =

Indian television series

- Genre: Soap opera
- Developed by: Leena Gangopadhyay
- Written by: Leena Gangopadhyay
- Directed by: Saibal Banerjee; Sujit Paain; Sudip Santra
- Creative director: Leena Gangopadhyay
- Presented by: Bright Advertising Pvt. Ltd.
- Starring: Madhumita Sarkar; Rishi Kaushik; Aparajita Ghosh Das
- Theme music composer: Debojyoti Mishra
- Opening theme: "Kusum Dola" by Anweshaa
- Composer: Debojyoti Mishra
- Country of origin: India
- Original language: Bengali
- No. of episodes: 731

Production
- Executive producers: Sumit Roy; Satyajit Chakraborty (Magic Moments)
- Producer: Saibal Banerjee
- Production locations: Kolkata; Jaisalmer; North Bengal
- Cinematography: Siddhartha Mukherjee
- Editors: Sameer; Soumen
- Camera setup: Multi-Camera
- Running time: 22 minutes (approx.)
- Production company: Magic Moments Motion Pictures

Original release
- Network: Star Jalsha
- Release: 22 August 2016 – 2 September 2018

Related
- Nenjam Marappathillai; Ghum Hai Kisikey Pyaar Mein; Anurager Chhowa

Kusum Dola is an Indian Bengali television soap opera that aired on Bengali Entertainment Channel Star Jalsha and is available on the digital platform Hotstar. It premiered on 22 August 2016, and was telecast daily. It was produced by Magic Moments Motion Pictures of Saibal Banerjee and Leena Ganguly. In January 2018, it had a TRP of 11.2. The series ended on 2 September 2018, airing 731 episodes; and was replaced by Irabotir Chupkotha.

The series stars Madhumita Sarkar, Rishi Kaushik and Aparajita Ghosh Das in lead roles, the latter two for the third time since their corresponding portrayal of the characters "Indra" and "Mohor" in the 2005 Zee Bangla television drama serial Ekdin Pratidin, and their respective characterizations of "Ujaan" and "Hiya" in the 2008 Star Jalsha romantic drama series Ekhane Aakash Neel, which ended in 2010.

== Plot ==
Imon Mukherjee is a kind-hearted, studious, and short-tempered young girl who pass higher secondary exam and aspires to be a doctor. She lives with her father, a police officer, Jayanta Mukherjee in Sundarpur, a village in North Bengal. She is supposed to go to Kolkata to study in a medical college and to achieve this Jayanta decides to take early retirement from his job. On the other hand, Ranojoy Chatterjee aka Rono, a Kolkata-based IPS Officer decides to go to Jaisalmer on a vacation. On the trip to Jaisalmer, Ranajay meets Roopkatha. They develop romantic feelings for each other but are unable to express them. As they bid adieu, Rono promises to call her.

Meanwhile, in Sundarpur, Iman is disturbed by Gogna, a local goon, almost every day. Gogna is obsessed with Iman and wants to marry her. When Jayanta discovers this, he arrests Gogna and punishes him in the police station. But Akhil Ghosh, a local political leader, orders him to release Gogna. When Jayanta refuses to do so, Akhil and his goons come to the police station and wreak havoc, and even hold Jayanta at a gun point. Iman comes to the police station and tries to rescue Jayanta, but Akhil's goons hold her at a gun point too. Akhil threatens to kill Iman if Jayanta does not release Gogna. Having no other choice, Jayanta is forced to release Gogna but warns Akhil that one day he and Gogna will pay for their sins. To take necessary steps against Gogna and Akhil, Jayanta files a request for an IPS officer to be posted in Sundarpur to deal with those goons.

Ranajay gets posted to Sundarpur and learns about Gogna's misdeeds from Jayanta and warns Gogna to stay away from Iman. Meanwhile, Jayanta decides to postpone his retirement to assist Ranajay in arresting Gogna. Iman is upset with this decision and blames Ranajay, leading to an argument.

On the other hand, Ranajay's brother, Badshah's marriage fixed with Roopkatha, who is sad as Ranajay didn't contact her and believes that he played with her. Ranajay learns about Badshah's wedding and decides to visit Kolkata for a few days. He is shocked to see that Roopkatha is Badshah's bride whereas Roopkatha is also surprised to learn that Ranajay is Badshah's brother.

Ranajay confronts Roopkatha and while the misunderstanding is cleared, Ranajay refuses to break his brother's marriage but promises Roopkatha he would never love another woman. Meanwhile, Gogna decides to take advantage of Ranajay's absence and plans to marry Iman. When Jayanta is returning to Sundarpur from work, Gogna abducts him and takes him to his den. Iman worries about Jayanta when he does not return home and decides to search for Jayanta. When she goes out to search for him, Gogna abducts her too and takes her to a temple to forcefully marry her. The local villagers call Ranajay and inform him about Jayanta and Iman's abduction and requests him to come and rescue them. Ranajay leaves the wedding to return to Sundarpur which makes Roopkatha upset. Gogna threatens to kill Jayanta if Iman does not marry him, so having no other choice Iman agrees to marry him.

Ranajay and the local police reach the spot before Gogna could marry Iman. Gogna tries to escape with Iman but Ranajay shoots him. Ranajay rescues both Iman and Jayanta. Roopkatha calls Ranajay to learn why he left her wedding suddenly. Ranajay explains why and again promises her that she will always have a place in his heart. Badshah overhears their conversation and decides to leave his house, not wanting to get in between Ranajay and Roopkatha. Badshah tells his family that he needs to go to an army operation, making them sad. His family get a call from Badshah's office and learn that he is missing, leaving them shocked. Roopkatha informs Ranajay about his brother's disappearance. Ranajay, extremely sad over his brother's disappearance, assures her that Badshah is alive and will return one day.

In Sundarpur, Ranajay, Jayanta and the police plan a sting operation to catch Gogna. Iman, being worried about Jayanta, requests Ranajay to not include him in the operation, but Ranajay refuses. Iman also requests Jayanta to not take part in the operation, but he does not listen to her either, telling her that he will retire after arresting Gogna. In the operation, Gogna shoots Jayanta, leaving him fatally injured. He is eventually arrested by Ranajay and the police. However, he threatens Ranajay that one day he will return for revenge and Ranajay will have the same fate as Jayanta. Ranajay takes Jayanta to the hospital, where he requests Ranajay to look after Iman if he dies. Ranajay informs Iman about Jayanta's condition, and a dejected Iman blames Ranajay and alive holds him responsible for Jayanta's condition. Despite the doctor's efforts, Jayanta dies.

Devastated by father’s death, Iman tries to commit suicide but is saved by Ranajay, who donates blood for her. The Villagers request Ranajay and Iman to marry each other. Both of them rejects the proposal but later Ranajay decides to marry Iman to take care of her. He requests Roopkatha to visit Sundarpur but does not tell her about his marriage. Ranajay tells Iman of his commitment to Roopkatha and Iman agrees that she will not expect anything from him as a husband and tells him she can never be his wife and will leave him after she becomes a doctor. On the day of Marriage, Akhil Ghosh comes temple with his goons and tried to spoil Ranajay and Iman's marriage . Akhil tease Ranajay to marry Iman. But Ranajay slaps him and say to leave the temple area.

Roopkatha visits Sundarpur and is shocked to see that Ranajay and Iman got married. Later, Ranajay decides to return to Kolkata along with Iman. Ranajay's family members refuse to accept Iman as Ranajay's wife. Feeling betrayed by Ranajay, Roopkatha inflicts her frustrations on Iman. Ranajay gets emotionally attached to Iman, seeing her efforts to help his family members, despite their behaviour towards her and subsequently falls in love with her, but cannot confess.

During Durga Puja celebrations, Iman helps Ranajay's cousin, Koli, reunite with and marry her lover, Dipto. Iman also brings Badshah back into the house. Badshah wants to free Roopkatha from their namesake relationship, but she proposes they continue, wanting to stay close to Ranajay. Iman finally confesses her love to Rono on his birthday. A devastated Roopkatha tries to accuse Rono of impregnating her but seeing Iman's faith in Rono's innocence, she backs down and is about to leave the house when she is asked to stay by Badshah and the family.

Gogna arrives at Kolkata and abducts Iman and misbehaves with her. Iman fights with Gogna and his goons and is eventually rescued by Ranajay, who arrests Gogna again. Meanwhile, Ranajay's friend Krishnamoy, a naxalite, dies leaving his pregnant widow, Shruti, in Ranajay's care. Iman and the family suspect Ranajay of having an affair when he impersonates as Shruti's husband and Shruti's child, Michhil's father. Iman files for a divorce. Ranajay is forced to leave the house and Shruti develops romantic feelings for him. Iman learns about her pregnancy, but is abducted by the supposedly-dead Krishnamoy, who seeks revenge from Ranajay, having misunderstood his relationship with Shruti. Iman is rescued by Ranajay, whom she once again misunderstands and files a lawsuit against Ranajay for infidelity. In court, Ranajay is proved innocent and Iman repents for her actions. Also, the court declares Ranajay and Iman's divorce to be null and void because the divorce is fake. Ranajay goes to meet Krishnamoy to plead with him to change his ways for Shruti and their baby but Krishna, in a fit of rage, shoots Ranajay, who is saved after Shruti donates blood for him. Krishna is arrested.

Post recovery, Ranajay and Iman resolve their differences and reunite. Gogna returns again and kidnaps Iman, but is shot by Ranajay who comes to Iman's rescue. After Iman (now a medical intern) treats Gogna and saves him, he repents for his past actions and decides to mend his ways. Roopkatha and Badshah confess their feelings for each other and decide to start anew.

Shruti is revealed to be in the last stages of breast cancer and is dying. When Ranajay is unable to make it to Iman's delivery, due to Shruti's operation, Iman breaks all ties with Ranajay and later, leaves for Ujanpur with her newborn daughter, Pekhom. Ranajay applies for a transfer to be with Iman and Pekhom. Shruti finally dies in Ujanpur Hospital, only after expressing her desire for Ranajay and Iman to reunite.

Later, Ranajay is forced to arrest Iman, regarding her role in the accidental death of a patient named Parasar. He arranges for her bail, and decides to find out the true culprits as well as the people responsible for illegal trafficking of new born children from the hospital. Madhuparna defends Iman as her lawyer, and after Nurse Ratnabali is proven guilty, Iman is released. Iman and Ranajay finally resolve their differences and relocate themselves to Kolkata, returning to the Chatterjee House.

Roopkatha grows jealous and agitated over Iman's happy and peaceful life, which she herself yearns for, having no children of her own. She acts out and to pacify her, Iman gives her daughter Pekhom's charge to Roopkatha, who quickly becomes over possessive of Pekhom. Krishnamoy too arrives, having been released from jail, to take his son Michhil back with him, leaving Ranajay heartbroken.

Iman plans a family trip during which Badshah suffers a heart attack and suddenly dies. A desolate Roopkatha blames Iman. Roopkatha attempts suicide but is rescued by Ranajay. After Roopkatha is diagnosed with severe depression, Ranajay stands by her to help her recover as she begins to seek him as a loved one to fill in her loneliness.

Ranajay's family wants Roopkatha out of the house to avoid any further tensions, but Ranajay dismisses the idea. Iman and other family members feel insecure due to Ranajay's growing proximity towards Roopkatha, and everyone suspect them of having an affair. A mentally unstable Roopkatha assumes herself to be pregnant and believes it to be Rono's child, leading a heartbroken Iman to leave the house with Pekhom and working overtime to make ends meet. It is revealed that Roopkatha is not pregnant and instead has a tumour in her uterus that poses a threat to her life. Roopkatha struggles to accept the fact and is finally made to leave the Chatterjee house for her own betterment so that she can start her life afresh. Iman and Ranajay, however, remain separated.

=== Five years later ===
Five years later, Roopkatha, now a college professor, meets Iman, now a professional doctor, to invite her to her wedding with Ranajay. Later, she visits the Chatterjee house to invite them to her wedding with Ranajay. Secretly, Roopkatha plans to reunite Iman and Ranajay by remarrying them on the day of her wedding and their 12th marriage anniversary. Meanwhile, Iman receives the Konya Rotno award. Iman, as per Roopkatha's request, manages to bring the Chatterjees to Roopkatha's wedding, much to their distaste, as all assume that Roopkatha is marrying Ranajay. However, Roopkatha surprises everyone by introducing Alok as her groom.

Iman and Ranajay have an emotional confrontation, marking their reunion, sorting out all their differences. His family members also realize his innocence and reunite with him, welcoming him and Iman back into their family. Lastly, Roopkatha, taking the heartfelt apologies, blessings and good wishes from the Chatterjees, marries Alok, marking a new phase in her life, as the series ends on a joyous note.

== Cast ==
=== Main ===
- Rishi Kaushik as Ranajay “Rono” Chatterjee – An IPS officer; Radharani and Habu's son; Badshah, Koli, Ani and Tublu's cousin; Roopkatha's best friend and ex-lover; Imon's husband; Pekhom's father; Michhil's adoptive father
- Madhumita Sarkar as Dr. Iman “Imon” Chatterjee (née Mukherjee) – An M.B.B.S. and M.D. private-practicing doctor and college lecturer; Jayanta and Anandi's daughter; Rono's wife; Pekhom's mother; Michhil's adoptive mother
- Aparajita Ghosh Das as Roopkatha Majumder (née Ghoshal / formerly Mukherjee) – A college professor; Nirupam and Jayashree's daughter; Rono's best friend and ex-lover; Badshah's widow; Alok's wife

=== Recurring ===
- Badshah Moitra as Mrityunjoy "Badshah" Mukherjee – An NGO worker and former army officer; Madhu's son; Koli, Rono, Ani and Tublu's cousin; Roopkatha's first husband (Deceased)
- Madhabi Mukherjee as Madhabilata "Madhu" Mukherjee (née Chatterjee) – Sabu, Chinmoy, Habu, Gabu and Komo's sister; Badshah's mother
- Sabitri Chatterjee as Sabitri "Sabu" Chatterjee – Madhu, Chinmoy, Habu, Gabu and Komo's sister
- Anusuya Majumdar as Nayanmani Chatterjee – Chinmoy's widow; Koli's mother
- Santu Mukherjee as Jyotirmoy "Habu" Chatterjee – Madhu, Sabu, Chinmoy, Gabu and Komo's brother; Radharani's husband; Rono's father; Pekhom's grandfather
- Rita Dutta Chakraborty as Radharani Chatterjee – Habu's wife; Rono's mother; Pekhom's grandmother
- Gautam De as Hiranmoy "Gabu" Chatterjee – Madhu, Sabu, Chinmoy, Habu and Komo's brother; Sapna's husband; Tublu's father
- Suchismita Chowdhury as Sapna Chatterjee – Gabu's wife; Tublu's mother
- Laboni Sarkar as Kumudini "Komo" Bose (née Chatterjee) – Madhu, Sabu, Chinmoy, Habu and Gabu's sister; Ananyo's wife; Ani's mother
- Shankar Chakraborty as Dr. Ananyo Bose – Komo's husband; Ani's father; Iman's college professor
- Bidipta Chakraborty as Kamalkoli "Koli" Bose (née Chatterjee) – Nayanmani's daughter; Badshah, Ani, Rono and Tublu's cousin; Dipto's wife
- Abhishek Chatterjee as Diptoman "Dipto" Bose – Koli's husband
- Suman Banerjee as Anirban "Ani" Bose – A XEROX shop owner; Komo and Ananyo's son; Badshah, Koli, Rono and Tublu's cousin
- Sudip Sarkar as Tanmoy "Tublu" Chatterjee – A theatre actor; Sapna and Gabu's son; Badshah, Koli, Ani and Rono's cousin; Mithu's husband; Iman's brother-figure
- Sneha Chatterjee Bhowmik as Mayitree "Mithu" Chatterjee – Tublu's wife
- Debranjan Nag as Ranjit Sarkar - Sabitri's ex-boyfriend
- Chandan Sen as Jayanta Mukherjee – A police officer; Iman's father; Rono's colleague in Sundarpur and father-in-law; Pekhom's maternal grandfather (Deceased)
- Subhadra Chakraborty as Bhanumati “Bhanu” – Iman's caretaker and foster mother
- Satyam Majumder as Brojeshwar Barman - Iman's fellow villager
- Arup Roy as Palash Kariyappa - Iman's fellow villager; Prakash's brother
- Abhijit Ghosh as Prakash Kariyappa - Iman's fellow villager; Palash's brother
- Phalguni Chatterjee as Nirupam Ghoshal – Roopkatha's father
- Saswati Guha Thakurata as Jayashree Ghoshal – Roopkatha's mother
- Debdut Ghosh as Alok Majumdar – Roopkatha's second husband (cameo appearance in the last episode)
- Joyjit Banerjee as Gogna – A local goon of Sundarpur village; Iman’s one-sided obsessive lover; Jayanta's murderer
- Debjani Chakraborty as Monglu - A silly girl and co-passenger in bus
- Debolina Mukherjee as Jonglu - Another silly girl; Monglu's sister and co-passenger in a bus
- Arnab Bhadra as Dr. Ujjwal Roy - Ananyo's friend; Iman's psychiatrist
- Tathagata Mukherjee as Krishnamoy "Kanhaiya" Bose – Former leader of an anti-social rebel group; Rono's college friend; Shruti's widower; Michhil's father
- Roosha Chatterjee as Shruti Bose (née Ghosh) – Krishanmoy's wife; Michhil's mother; Rono's protégé-turned-close friend and one-sided lover (Dead)
- Anindita Saha Kapileshwari as Shruti's neighbour
- Koushik Roy as Shramanjit Ganguly – Rono's lawyer turned friend; Madhuparna's husband
- Madhubani Ghosh as Madhuparna Ganguly (née Sengupta) – Iman's lawyer turned friend; Shramanjit's wife
- Kaushik Chakraborty as Dr. Amolin Bose – Iman's senior colleague at Ujanpur Government Nursing Home
- Diganta Bagchi as Iman's opposition lawyer
- Sonal Mishra as Ritoja Chowdhury - A Chief nurse; Iman's batchmate in Medical college and colleague at Ujaanpur Government Nursing Home

== Production ==
=== Development ===
Screenwriter Leena Gangopadhyay who has previously written down the script for Bengali TV shows like ETV Bangla's long-running drama series Sonar Horin and another daily soap Binni Dhaner Khoi, Zee Bangla's partition-themed love saga Keya Patar Nouko, and Star Jalsha's serials Ishti Kutum and Jol Nupur; developed the central idea for Kusum Dola.

She made the main female protagonist, tentatively named Shimul, a village girl who is bright in her studies and quite upfront by nature. Circumstances force the girl to marry a man (the lead hero), who is previously committed to another woman (the third main lead). Ganguly decided to have the backdrop of an extended family, and had the other woman (named Roopkatha) marry the hero's brother and live in the same house as the hero (named Rono).

=== Casting ===
Rishi Kaushik who had previously collaborated with Ganguly and Banerjee in their production Ishti Kutum, was selected to portray the lead role of IPS Ranajay Chatterjee a.k.a. Rono. Later Rishi said in a 2018 interview that his character "Rono" is reserved and headstrong like his real-life self. Aparajita Ghosh Das who had been playing the heroine in another TV serial Kojagori (on Zee Bangla), was cast in to play the other prominent lead character, Roopkatha, taking into account her onscreen chemistry with Kaushik. Actress Madhumita Sarkar, noted for her portrayal of Juni in medical romance-drama series Care Kori Na, and Pakhi and Khushi respectively in the romance saga Bojhena Se Bojhena; was cast to portray Shimul (later named Emon).

=== Broadcast and streaming services ===
The series premiered on 22 August 2016 and replaced Prasenjit Chatterjee starrer Mahanayak TV series and was telecast every day on Bengali GEC Star Jalsha and its corresponding channel with HD feed, Star Jalsha HD. It is available via optimum cable connection or by satellite TV connections. The show has been distributed by Star India, in association with Novi Digital Entertainment. On the digital platform, Kusum Dola is available for viewing on the app Hotstar. New episodes are released earlier than on TV, and the service is available for viewers having a premium subscription plan.

=== Filming ===
The show has been filmed at several locations, the most prominent being Kalimpong.

== Soundtrack ==
Anwesha Dutta Gupta, who has frequently collaborated with the production house Magic Moments Motion Pictures for recording theme songs for Bengali television serials, sang the title song for the series. While, the original music has been given by Debojyoti Mishra.

Kusum Dola Soundtrack:
No.	Title	Singer	Length
1.	"Kusum Dola Title Song"	Anwesha Dutta Gupta	2:33

== Adaptations ==
Language	Title	Original Release	Network(s)	Last aired	Notes
Bengali	Kusum Dola কুসুম দোলা	18 March 2013	Star Jalsha	2 September 2018	Original
Tamil	Nenjam Marappathillai நெஞ்சம் மறப்பதில்லை	9 October 2017	Star Vijay	23 February 2019	Remake
Hindi	Ghum Hai Kisikey Pyaar Meiin गुम है किसी के प्यार में	5 October 2020	StarPlus	27 June 2023	Remake
Kannada	Marali Manasagide ಮರಳಿ ಮನಸಾಗಿದೆ	9 August 2021	Star Suvarna	21 January 2023	Remake
Marathi	Lagnachi Bedi लग्नाची बेडी	31 January 2022	Star Pravah	15 December 2024	Remake
Telugu	Krishna Mukunda Murari కృష్ణ ముకుంద మురారి	31 May 2021	Star Maa	8 June 2024	Remake
Malayalam	Chandrikayilaliyunna Chandrakantham ചന്ദ്രികയിലലിയുന്ന ചന്ദ്രകാന്തം	20 November 2023	Asianet	23 May 2025	Remake
