= Jodi Hakki =

Joddi Hakki may refer to:

- Jodi Hakki (film), 1997
- Jodi Hakki (TV series), 2017-2019
