= Spandana =

Spandana may refer to:

- Spandana (1978 film), a 1978 Indian Kannada-language film, cinematography by B. C. Gowrishankar
- Spandana (2015 film), a 2015 Sri Lankan romantic horror film
- Divya Spandana (born 1982), Indian actress and politician from Karnataka
- Spandana, a character in the Kannada-language TV series Marali Manasagide (2021–)
- Spandana, a character in the Indian Kannada-language film Kismath (2018)
