= Kuler Achaar =

2022 Indian Bengali film

- Official Poster
- Directed by: Sudeep Das
- Written by: Sudeep Das
- Produced by: Shrikant Mohta; Mahendra Soni
- Starring: Madhumita Sarcar; Vikram Chatterjee; Indrani Haldar; Sujan Mukhopadhyay
- Cinematography: Prosenjit Chowdhury
- Edited by: Sanglap Bhowmick
- Music by: Savvy
- Production company: Shree Venkatesh Films
- Distributed by: Shree Venkatesh Films
- Release date: 15 July 2022
- Country: India
- Language: Bengali

Kuler Achaar is a 2022 Indian Bengali-language family drama film directed by Sudeep Das. The film is produced by Shrikant Mohta and Mahendra Soni under the banner of Shree Venkatesh Films. The film features Madhumita Sarcar, Vikram Chatterjee, Indrani Haldar and Sujan Mukhopadhyay in lead roles. The film did fairly well at the box office.

== Plot ==
The story begins with a funny yet unfortunate incident which forces the newlyweds, Mithi and Pritam, to return home. They find themselves in a compromising position on their honeymoon when the validity of their marriage is questioned because Mithi refused to change her surname. She is determined not to change her surname after marriage but it doesn't sit well with her orthodox in-laws and the patriarchal society. Her decision leads to problems in her family as she faces stern opposition from her father-in-law, Pronotosh. Though Mithi's husband, Pritam is meek and quiet, he is a true liberal and respects his wife's wish. He loves Mithi and he stands by her but not at the cost of his family's peace. Her in-laws continue to call her out for her stubbornness and all hell breaks loose when Mitali, her mother-in-law, starts supporting Mithi in her stance, finding herself a comrade in the right cause where even she wants to follow suit and keep her maiden surname. What follows is a joyful yet poignantly complex ride mixed with emotions which leaves the audience with a thought-provoking message at the end.

== Cast ==
- Madhumita Sarcar as Mithi ,pritams's wife
- Vikram Chatterjee as Pritam, Mithi's husband
- Indrani Haldar as Mitali, Pritam's mother
- Sujan Mukhopadhyay as Pronotosh, Pritam's father

== Release ==
The film was released in theatres on 15 July, 2022.

== Soundtrack ==
Kuler Achaar

Soundtrack album by Prasen
- Released: 2022
- Genre: Film soundtrack
- Language: Bengali
- Label: SVF

Track listing
No.	Title	Lyrics	Singer(s)	Length
1.	"Bhul Koreche Bhul"	Prasen	Mahtim Shakib, Madhubanti Bagchi	3:33
2.	"Ami Amar Modhye"	Prasen	Iman Chakraborty	3:45
3.	"Bhul Koreche Bhul (Reprise)"	Prasen	Mahtim Shakib	3:26
