= Chhoti Jathani =

Indian Punjabi television series

- Genre: Drama
- Story by: Ashish Bhatt
- Directed by: Gurpreet Rana; Swapnil Deshmukh
- Country of origin: India
- Original language: Punjabi
- No. of episodes: 370

Production
- Camera setup: Multi-camera
- Running time: 22 minutes

Original release
- Network: Zee Punjabi
- Release: 14 June 2021 – 11 November 2022

Related
- Tujhyat Jeev Rangala

Chhoti Jathani (transl. Younger Elder Brother's Wife) is an Indian Punjabi drama television series that premiered from 14 June 2021 on Zee Punjabi. It is produced under the banner of Zee Studios and stars Gurjeet Singh Channi, Mandeep Kaur and Seerat Kapoor. It is an official remake of Marathi TV series Tujhyat Jeev Rangala. It ended on 11 November 2022.

== Plot ==
Ajooni and Zorawar get married despite coming from different backgrounds. But the two faces problems in life when Zorawar's sister-in-law, Savreen, tries to establish her dominance in the household.

== Cast ==
- Gurjeet Singh Channi as Zorawar Singh Bajwa, Ajooni's husband. (2021–2022)
- Mandeep Kaur as Ajooni Sidhu, Zorawar's wife. (2021–2022)
- Seerat Kapoor as Savreen Kaur Bajwa, Zorawar's sister-in-law. (2021–2022)
  - Shivangi Shahi replaced Seerat Kapoor as Savreen Kaur Bajwa. (2021–2022)
- Nazish as Chanchal. (2021–2022)
- Abhishek Mehta as Jashan Singh Bajwa. (2021–2022)
- Amandeep as Channi Bua. (2021–2022)
- Vishal Saini as Navdeep Singh Bajwa. (2021–2022)
- Varinder sandhu as shinda ( 2021 - 2022 )
- Naresh Nikki as Professor Tib. (2021–2022)

== Adaptations ==
Language	Title	Original release	Network(s)	Last aired	Notes
Marathi	Tujhyat Jeev Rangala तुझ्यात जीव रंगला	3 October 2016	Zee Marathi	2 January 2021	Original
Kannada	Jodi Hakki ಜೋಡಿ ಹಕ್ಕಿ	13 March 2017	Zee Kannada	5 July 2019	Remake
Tamil	Rekka Katti Parakkudhu Manasu றெக்கை கட்டி பறக்குது மனசு	19 June 2017	Zee Tamil	24 May 2019	Remake
Malayalam	Alliyambal അല്ലിയാമ്പൽ	26 November 2018	Zee Keralam	9 November 2019	Remake
Punjabi	Chhoti Jathani ਛੋਟੀ ਜਠਾਣੀ	14 June 2021	Zee Punjabi	11 November 2022	Remake
