= Tujhya Majhya Sansarala Aani Kay Hava! =

2021 Indian Marathi language TV series

- Genre: Drama
- Written by: Adwait Dadarkar; Pralhad Kudtarkar
- Directed by: Sanjay Zankar
- Starring: See below
- Theme music composer: Samir Saptiskar
- Country of origin: India
- Original language: Marathi
- No. of episodes: 306

Production
- Camera setup: Multi-Camera
- Running time: 22 minutes
- Production company: Zankar Films

Original release
- Network: Zee Marathi
- Release: 30 August 2021 – 6 August 2022

Tujhya Majhya Sansarala Aani Kay Hava! (transl. What more could yours and my world want!) is an Indian Marathi language television series which aired on Zee Marathi. It premiered from 30 August 2021 by replacing Majha Hoshil Na. It is directed by Sanjay Zankar under the banner of Zankar Films. It starred Hardeek Joshi and Amruta Pawar in lead roles.

== Plot ==
Siddharth Deshmukh comes from a middle class large joint family from Gulpoli, a small town near Nashik. Aditi Karmarkar comes from a distorted nuclear family whose parents are divorced. Siddharth is ambitious and can adjust with many situations but Aditi is scared of crowd and relationships which she yearned for all these years. Siddharth's grandparents hold their family members together with the rooted values whereas Aditi's parents Milind and Mahalaxmi have clashes of their egos and hence are separated.

Siddharth works in Aditi's company and they fall in love. They confess their love and decide to get married. Siddharth is afraid Aditi's disturbing nature towards large families. Upon Aditi's insistence, they visit Gulpoli. Aditi gets ecstatic upon seeing Siddharth large family and falls unconscious when she saw the family in a collusum. Siddharth and family get her rested and brings her back to normal. He introduces Aditi as his good-friend. Deshmukh family starts for Sid's alliance. On his engagement day, Sid reveals his and Aditi's relationship to the family to which they accept. Aditi slowly starts getting acclimatized with crowded family and gets love from everyone. The Deshmukh's ask Aditi to get her parents to Gulpoli. Aditi gets scared due to the difference in the families. Milind and Mahalaxmi visit Deshmukh's and they accept their divorce. Milind and Mahalaxmi get annoyed by their large family.

== Cast ==
=== Main ===
- Hardeek Joshi as Siddharth Appa Deshmukh
- Amruta Pawar as Aditi Milind Karmarkar / Aditi Siddharth Deshmukh

=== Recurring ===
Siddharth's family

- Charudatta Kulkarni as Tatya
- Surekha Lahamage-Sharma as Bayobai
- Prashant Garud / Raja Rana as Appa
- Anjali Joshi / Manjusha Joshi as Sumitra Appa Deshmukh (Mothyabai)
- Hemant Deshpande as Bapu Kaka
- Chitra Kulkarni / Shubhada Naik as Tai Kaki
- Aparna Kshemkalyani as Ratna Jadhav
- Yogesh Bagul as Ratna's husband
- Niwas More / Sanjay Gangavane as Nana Kaka
- Poonam Chavan-Deshmukh as Nani Kaki
- Salman Tamboli as Bala Kaka
- Rekha Kamble-Sagwekar / Jyoti Raul as Pallavi Bala Deshmukh (Pallu Kaki)
- Prateek Patil as Suhas Bapu Deshmukh
- Komal Shete as Archana Suhas Deshmukh
- Meera Deshmukh as Meera Suhas Deshmukh
- Radhika Zankar as Namita Bapu Deshmukh (Nama)
- Suhani Naik as Aarya Nana Deshmukh
- Arjun Kumthekar as Dhrishtadyumna Nana Deshmukh (Dumnya)
- Ajay Tarage as Sakha

Aditi's family

- Priya Kamble-Tuljapurkar as Mahalaxmi Milind Karmarkar
- Dhananjay Wable as Milind Karmarkar
- Saurabh Kale as Raghav
- Rupali Kadam as Alvira
- Laxmi Pimpale as Surekha

=== Others ===
- Veena Jagtap as Reva Dixit
- Shubham Patil as Yuvraj; Aditi's friend
- Ganesh Jadhav as Chandrakant Bhingarde (Chandler); Photographer
- Nikhil Rahane as Amit; Siddharth's friend
- Akshay Dhond as Sachin; Siddharth's friend

== Reception ==
=== Special episode ===
==== 1 hour ====
- 31 October 2021
- 21 November 2021
- 9 January 2022
- 6 February 2022
- 13 February 2022
- 20 February 2022
- 6 March 2022
- 17 April 2022

==== 2 hours ====
- 26 December 2021 (Sid-Aditi's marriage)

== Awards ==
Zee Marathi Utsav Natyancha Awards 2021
| Category | Recipient | Role | Ref. |
|---|---|---|---|
| Best Mother | Anjali Joshi | Mothyabai | |
| Best Grandmother | Surekha Lahamage-Sharma | Bayobai | |
| Best Family | | Deshmukh Family | |
