= Alliyambal =

Malayalam-language television serial

- Genre: Romance
- Written by: Subodh Khanolkar
- Directed by: Shiju Aroor
- Starring: Jai Dhanush; Pallavi Gowda
- Opening theme: "Alliyambal Ethale"
- Composer: Alphons Joseph
- Country of origin: India
- Original language: Malayalam
- No. of episodes: 291

Production
- Producer: Jeeja Surendran
- Production location: Alappuzha
- Running time: 22 minutes

Original release
- Network: Zee Keralam
- Release: 26 November 2018 – 9 November 2019

Related
- Tujhyat Jeev Rangala; Rekka Katti Parakkudhu Manasu

Alliyambal was an Indian Malayalam language romantic soap opera television show aired on Zee Keralam TV channel and digitally on ZEE5 platform. It is an official remake of Marathi television show Tujhyat Jeev Rangala.

South Indian actors Jai Dhanush and Pallavi Gowda plays the lead roles marking their debut in Malayalam Television. The channel has announced the second part due to its high viewership. Teams are planning for sequel. It is dubbed into Telugu as Fida.

== Plot ==
The show story of is the love story of landlord and wrestler Devan and highly educated school teacher Alli who has recently moved to the village. Their difference in mindset, upbringing and lifestyle makes their love story sweet and complicated at the same time.

== Cast ==
Lead Cast

- Pallavi Gowda as Alli
- Jai Dhanush as Devan/Devabhadran
- Keerthi Jai Dhanush as Archa Vishnubhadran
- Jayan as Veerabhadran, Devan and Vishnu's father
- Abhinay Shiju as Manikuttan

Recurring Cast

- Benny John as Chinnan
- Thrissur Elsy as Ayamma
- Ibrahim kutty as Viswanathan
- Midhula as Pavithra
- Akhil Anand as Vishnubhadran
- Shanavas Shanu as Sreeram
- ______ as Revamma
- Sreekala Sasidharan as Deepa
- Manju Vineesh as Ganga
- Jaseela Parveen as Mythili
- Bindu Ramakrishnan as Nagamaniyamma
- Sadhika Venugopal as Devan's mother
- Ameya Nair as Shalini
- ______ as Prabhakaran
- ______ as Vavachan
- Thirumala Ramachandran
- Architha
- Dini Daniel

== Adaptations ==
Language	Title	Original release	Network(s)	Last aired	Notes
Marathi	Tujhyat Jeev Rangala तुझ्यात जीव रंगला	3 October 2016	Zee Marathi	2 January 2021	Original
Kannada	Jodi Hakki ಜೋಡಿ ಹಕ್ಕಿ	13 March 2017	Zee Kannada	5 July 2019	Remake
Tamil	Rekka Katti Parakkudhu Manasu றெக்கை கட்டி பறக்குது மனசு	19 June 2017	Zee Tamil	24 May 2019	Remake
Malayalam	Alliyambal അല്ലിയാമ്പൽ	26 November 2018	Zee Keralam	9 November 2019	Remake
Punjabi	Chhoti Jathani ਛੋਟੀ ਜਠਾਣੀ	14 June 2021	Zee Punjabi	11 November 2022	Remake
