= Pallavi Gowda =

Indian actress

- Occupation: Actress
- Years active: 2010–present

Pallavi Gowda is an Indian television and film actress, who works mainly in Malayalam, Kannada and Telugu soaps. She is known for her roles in Pasupu Kumkuma, Savitri, Alliyambal, and Jodi Hakki.

== Filmography ==
=== Television ===
List of Pallavi Gowda television credits
Year	Show	Role	Language	Channel	Notes/Ref.
2010	Mane Ondu Mooru Bagilu		Kannada	ETV Kannada	Debut
2011–2014	Pasupu Kumkuma	Savitri / Anjali	Telugu	Zee Telugu	
2015–2019	Savitri	Savitri	Telugu	ETV Telugu	
2014–2016	Galipata	Anuradha	Kannada	ETV Kannada	
2016–2017	Parinaya	Shashi Rekha (Shashi or Muddu)	Kannada	Kasthuri TV	
2017	Shaantham Paapam	Herself as a host for 1 episode	Kannada	Colors Super	
2017–2019	Jodi Hakki	Nanditha	Kannada	Zee Kannada	
2018–2019	Alliyambal	Alli	Malayalam	Zee Keralam	
2019–2020	Sevanthi	Sevanthi	Kannada	Udaya TV	
2019	Dance Karnataka Dance Family War Season 2	Contestant along with Anupama Bhatt	Kannada	Zee Kannada	
2021–2022	Chadarangam	Nagambika	Telugu	Gemini TV	
2021	Suryakantham	Sodamini	Telugu	Zee Telugu	Cameo
2021–2022	Daya	Daya	Malayalam	Asianet	Nominated—Asianet Television Awards for Best Female Debutant
2022	Krishna Mukunda Murari	Krishna’s mother	Telugu	Star Maa	Cameo
2022	Star Singer	Herself in Grand Finale Promo	Malayalam	Asianet	
2023–2024	Swayamvaram	Shari/Sharika	Malayalam	Mazhavil Manorama	Replaced by Arya Anil
2023	Sita Ramam	Meera	Malayalam	Surya TV	
2023–2026	Nindu Noorella Savaasam	Arundhati	Telugu	Zee Telugu	
2024–2025	Yevandoi Srimati Garu	Mithuna	Telugu	Gemini TV	
2024	Kirrack Boys Khiladi Girls	Contestant	Telugu	Star Maa	
2025–present	Idhayam – Season 2	Bharathi	Tamil	Zee Tamil	
2026–present	Chamanthi	Chamanthi	Telugu	Zee Telugu	Replaced Meghana Lokesh

=== Films ===
List of Pallavi Gowda film credits
Year	Film	Role	Language	Notes
2016	Prema Geema Jane		Kannada	Debut
2017	Kidi	Nandhini	Kannada	
2019	Nam Gani B.com Pass		Kannada	

=== Web series ===
List of Pallavi Gowda web series credits
Year	Show	Role	Language	Channel	Notes
2021	2 States		Telugu	The Mix/YouTube	
2021	Amma Avakai Anjali	Anjali	Telugu	The Mix/YouTube	

== See also ==
- List of Indian television actresses
- List of Kannada film actresses
