= Rekka Katti Parakkudhu Manasu =

- Genre: Soap opera
- Based on: Tujhyat Jeev Rangala; Zee Marathi
- Written by: Orange Media Productions (Dialogues)
- Screenplay by: Orange Media Productions
- Directed by: Muthukumaran Former (Bashir)
- Starring: Siddharth; Sameera Sherief; Vadivukkarasi
- Theme music composer: Vishal Chandrasekhar
- Opening theme: "En Manasu"
- Composer: Arun
- Country of origin: India
- Original language: Tamil
- No. of episodes: 521

Production
- Producers: Syed Anwar Ahmed; Sameera Sherief
- Production location: Theni district
- Cinematography: E. Martin Joe; Santhosh
- Editor: S. Mathan Kumar
- Camera setup: Multi-camera
- Running time: 22 minutes
- Production company: Orange Media Productions

Original release
- Network: Zee Tamil
- Release: 19 June 2017 – 24 May 2019

Rekka Katti Parakkudhu Manasu is an Indian Tamil soap opera starring Siddharth and Sameera. Zee Tamil broadcast this series from 19 June 2017.

The show is produced by Syed Anwar and Sameera Sherief, and is an official remake of the Marathi language television series Tujhyat Jeev Rangala which aired on Zee Marathi from October 2016.

== Plot ==
The show story of is the love story of farmer and wrestler Tamizh and highly educated school teacher Malar who has recently moved to the village. Their difference in mindset, upbringing and lifestyle makes their love story sweet and complicated at the same time.

== Cast ==
Main

- Siddharth Kumaran as Tamizhselvan aka Tamizh (Main male protagonist)
- Sameera Sherief as Malar Tamizhselvan. (Tamizh's wife, Main female protagonist) and Priyanka (Antagonist) - Dual role
- Syed Anwar Ahmed as Arunachalam aka Arun
- Sai Swetha \ Nirajani Ashok as Divya
- Geetha Saraswathi as Arun's Mother

Tamilzh`s Family

- Vadivukkarasi (episodes 1 to 36) and Shanthi Williams(episode 41 onwards) as Thayaramma (nanny of Tamizh and Shakthi)
- Ashwin Karthik as Shakthi (Tamizh's younger brother)
- Vandana Michael (episodes 1 to 237) and Nisha (episode 238 onwards) as Nandini (Shakthi's wife, Main antagonist)
- Jayaraj as Kumaresan
- Sheela as Dhanalakshmi (Tamizh's mother)

Malar's Family

- K Sankaranarayan as Vishwanathan (Malar's father)
- Srilatha as Dhanalakshmi (Malar's mother)

Supporting Characters

- Renu Soundar and Rhema as Valli
- K. Natraj as Arun's grandfather
- Ragavi Renu as Kayal (Malar's best friend)
- Deepa as Ganga (Nandini's maid)
- Vijayalakshmi as Nandini's mother
- Arivu Azhagan as (Tamizh's best friend)
- Karthi
- -- as Ashan
- -- as Mari
- B. Nilani

=== Special appearance ===
- Sanjeev and akshitha bopiah

== Adaptations ==
Language	Title	Original release	Network(s)	Last aired	Notes
Marathi	Tujhyat Jeev Rangala तुझ्यात जीव रंगला	3 October 2016	Zee Marathi	2 January 2021	Original
Kannada	Jodi Hakki ಜೋಡಿ ಹಕ್ಕಿ	13 March 2017	Zee Kannada	5 July 2019	Remake
Tamil	Rekka Katti Parakkudhu Manasu றெக்கை கட்டி பறக்குது மனசு	19 June 2017	Zee Tamil	24 May 2019	Remake
Malayalam	Alliyambal അല്ലിയാമ്പൽ	26 November 2018	Zee Keralam	9 November 2019	Remake
Punjabi	Chhoti Jathani ਛੋਟੀ ਜਠਾਣੀ	14 June 2021	Zee Punjabi	11 November 2022	Remake

== Awards and nominations ==
Year	Award	Category	Recipient	Result
2018
2018	1st Zee Tamil Family Awards	Favourite Marumagal	Sameera Sherief	Won
2018	1st Zee Tamil Family Awards	Favourite Heroine	Sameera Sherief	Nominated
2018	1st Zee Tamil Family Awards	Best Actor -Female	Sameera Sherief	Nominated
2018	1st Zee Tamil Family Awards	Favourite Pair -On Screen	Siddharth & Sameera Sherief	Nominated
2018	1st Zee Tamil Family Awards	Best Pair On Screen	Siddharth & Sameera Sherief	Nominated
2018	1st Zee Tamil Family Awards	Special Mention-All Rounder of Zee Tamil	Siddharth	Won
2018	1st Zee Tamil Family Awards	Favourite Hero Best Actor-Male	Siddharth	Nominated
2018	1st Zee Tamil Family Awards	Best Actor Male	Siddharth	Nominated
2018	1st Zee Tamil Family Awards	Best Villi	Nisha	Nominated
2018	1st Zee Tamil Family Awards	Best Supporting Actor -Male	Syed Anwar Ahmed	Nominated
2018	1st Zee Tamil Family Awards	Most Popular Appa	Jayaraj	Nominated
