= Cheeni 2 =

- Directed by: Mainak Bhaumik
- Screenplay by: Aritra Sengupta
- Produced by: Shrikant Mohta; Mahendra Soni
- Starring: Madhumita Sarcar; Aparajita Adhya; Anirban Chakrabarti; Soumya Mukhherjee
- Cinematography: Modhura Palit
- Music by: Mainak Mazoomdar
- Production company: Shree Venkatesh Films
- Distributed by: Shree Venkatesh Films
- Release date: 11 August 2023
- Running time: 125 minutes
- Country: India
- Language: Bengali

Cheeni 2 is a 2023 Indian Bengali language romantic comedy drama film directed by Mainak Bhaumik. The film is produced by Shrikant Mohta and Mahendra Soni. It's the second installment of 2020 Bengali film Cheeni. The film stars Madhumita Sarcar, Aparajita Adhya, Soumya Mukhherjee and Anirban Chakrabarti in lead roles.

== Plot ==
Mishti, a housewife, is taken for granted by her husband and treated with indifference by her children. Cheeni, a young girl and Mishti's new tenant, is full of life and has big dreams but is commitment phobic when it comes to relationships. These two women bond over their shared struggles and embark on a journey of self-discovery together. They strike a friendship that go beyond the ties of family. But things get complicated when Cheeni falls in love with Mishti's son.

== Cast ==
- Madhumita Sarcar as Cheeni
- Aparajita Auddy as Mishti
- Anirban Chakrabarti
- Lily Chakravarty
- Soumyo Mukherjee

== Music ==
Music of the film is composed by Mainak Mazoomdar.

Track listing
No.	Title	Lyrics	Singer(s)	Length
1.	"Emon Ekta Bondhu"	Barish	Somlata Acharyya Chowdhury	3:32
2.	"Tumi Jantei Paro Naa"	Nilanjan Chakraborty	Mahtim Shakib	3:44
3.	"Tomar Kachhakachhi"	Nilanjan Chakraborty	Lagnajita Chakraborty	3:49
Total length:				11:05
