= Hardeek Joshi =

Indian television actor

- Born: 6 October 1988 (age 37); Mumbai, Maharashtra, India
- Occupation: Actor
- Years active: 2016–present
- Known for: Tujhyat Jeev Rangala, Tuzya Mazya Sansarala Ani Kay Hava
- Spouse: Akshaya Deodhar (m. 2022)

Hardeek Joshi (born 6 October 1988) is an Indian actor based in Mumbai who works in Marathi television and film. He is best known for his portrayal of Rana in the Zee Marathi television series Tujhyat Jeev Rangala. He also played the role of Siddharth in the Zee Marathi series Tujhya Majhya Sansarala Aani Kay Hava!

== Career ==
Joshi appeared in the 2016 Makarand Anaspure film, Rangaa Patangaa. From 2016 to 2021, he played the lead role of Ranada in the Zee Marathi series Tujhyat Jeev Rangala. His character falls in love with Anjali, played by Akshaya Deodhar. In 2017, he played a negative role in the film Journey Premachi.

An ardent devotee of Shri Swami Samarth Maharaj, Joshi has been appeared in Zee Marathi's shows suc as Asmita and Radha Hi Bawari. He played Purshottam Gokhale in Star Pravah's Durva and has also appeared in Swapnanchya Palikadle and Crime Patrol.

== Personal life ==
In 2022, he became engaged to actress Akshaya Deodhar, his co-star from Tujhyat Jeev Rangala.

== Media image ==
Most Desirable Men of Maharashtra
Sponsor	Year	Rank	
Sponsor	Year	TV	Ref.
The Times of India; Maharashtra Times	2017	10	–
The Times of India; Maharashtra Times	2018	3	
The Times of India; Maharashtra Times	2019	9	

== Filmography ==
Key
†	Denotes films that have not yet been released

=== Films ===
Year	Title	Role	Ref.
2022	Har Har Mahadev	Abaji Vishwanath	
2024	Navardev Bsc. Agri	Sub-inspector Mahadev	
2024	Lockdown Lagna		
2024	Dharmaveer 2		
2024	Karmayogi Abasaheb	Balasaheb Erande	
2025	Aranya	Jiva Mahaka	
2026	Sammarth	Goku	
TBA	Vedat Marathe Veer Daudle Saat †	Malhari Lokhande	

=== Television ===
Year	Title	Role	Notes	Ref.
2008	Raja Shivchhatrapati	Kartalab Khan		
2011	Radha Hi Bawari		Recurring Role	
2013	Durva	Purushottam Gokhale	Recurring Role	
2014	Asmita	Mayur	Episodic Role	
2016–2021	Tujhyat Jeev Rangala	Ranvijay Gaikwad (Ranada)	Lead Role	
2019	Aghori	Vipranjali	Recurring role	
2021–2022	Tujhya Majhya Sansarala Aani Kay Hava!	Siddharth Deshmukh (Sid)	Lead role	
2023–2024	Tuzech Mi Geet Gaat Aahe	Shubhankar Thakur	Negative role	
2023–2024	Jau Bai Gavat	Himself	Host	
