= Jau Bai Gavat =

Marathi-language reality game show

- Genre: Reality show
- Starring: See below and Hardeek Joshi
- Country of origin: India
- Original language: Marathi
- No. of episodes: 62

Production
- Executive producer: Sandeep Arjun Kamble
- Production locations: Bavdhan, Maharashtra
- Camera setup: Multi-camera
- Running time: 45 minutes
- Production company: Zee Studios

Original release
- Network: Zee Marathi
- Release: 4 December 2023 – 11 February 2024

Related
- Chal Bhava Citit

Jau Bai Gavat (transl. Go to the Village Lady) is an Indian Marathi language television reality game show which aired on Zee Marathi. It is hosted by Hardeek Joshi which was supposed to premiere from 27 November 2023. It actually premiered from 4 December 2023 by replacing Sa Re Ga Ma Pa Marathi Li'l Champs. "Ramsha Farooqui" won the trophy for the first season.

== Plot ==
Eleven urban girls leave their luxurious lifestyle behind and move to a remote village to explore rural life and earn acceptance from the villagers.

== Guest appearances ==
- Rohit Parshuram and Shivani Naik (4 December 2023, 1–2 January 2024)
- Kushal Badrike (6 December 2023, 19–20 January 2024)
- Kranti Redkar (7 December 2023)
- Devdatta Nage (8 December 2023)
- Hrishikesh Shelar (9 December 2023)
- Gashmeer Mahajani and Nandesh Umap (11 December 2023)
- Mahesh Manjrekar (12 December 2023)
- Myra Vaikul, Jayesh Khare and Swara Joshi (13 December 2023)
- Ajay Purkar (14 December 2023)
- Pooja Sawant, Surekha Punekar and Mayur Vaidya (15-16 December 2023)
- Shreya Bugde (22-23 December 2023)
- Madhura Bachal (28 December 2023)
- Shubhankar Tawde, Sanskruti Balgude, Ruchi Kadam, Dakshata Joil and Shivani Rangole (1-2 January 2024)
- Sagar Karande (9 January 2024)
- Anand Shinde (11-12 January 2024)
- Akshaya Deodhar, Pushkar Jog, Disha Pardeshi, Kartiki Gaikwad and Ronit Pise (14 January 2024)
- Sanjay Mone (24 January 2024)
- Ashok Hande (26 January 2024)

== Contestants ==
1. Ramsha Farooqui (Winner)
2. Ankita Mestry (Runner-up)
3. Sanskruti Salunke (2nd Runner-up)
4. Rasika Dhobale (3rd Runner-up)
5. Shreyja Mhatre (3rd Runner-up)
6. Hetal Pakhare (Evicted)
7. Mukta Karandikar (Evicted)
8. Monisha Ajgaonkar (Evicted)
9. Vaishnavi Sawant (Evicted)
10. Shama Lakhani (Evicted)
11. Tanaya Afzalpurkar (Evicted)
12. Varsha Hegde (Evicted)
13. Sneha Bhosale (Evicted)

== Adaptations ==
Language	Title	Original release	Network(s)	Last aired	Notes
Marathi	Jau Bai Gavat जाऊ बाई गावात	4 December 2023	Zee Marathi	11 February 2024	Original
Hindi	Chhoriyan Chali Gaon छोरियाँ चली गाँव	3 August 2025	Zee TV	4 October 2025	Remake
Kannada	Halli Power ಹಳ್ಳಿ ಪವರ್	25 August 2025	Zee Power	28 December 2025	Remake
