= Tujhyat Jeev Rangala =

2016 Indian Marathi language TV series

- Genre: Romance; Drama
- Directed by: Aniket Sane
- Starring: See below
- Theme music composer: AV Prafullachandra
- Opening theme: "Tujhyat Jeev Rangala" by Anandi Joshi
- Country of origin: India
- Original language: Marathi
- No. of seasons: 4
- No. of episodes: 1262

Production
- Producer: Smruti Shinde
- Production locations: Kolhapur, Maharashtra
- Camera setup: Multi-camera
- Running time: 22 minutes
- Production company: Sobo Films

Original release
- Network: Zee Marathi
- Release: 3 October 2016 – 2 January 2021

Tujhyat Jeev Rangala (transl. My heart is filled in you) is an Indian Marathi language television series which aired on Zee Marathi. The show is one of the top rated Marathi TV show from its inception and also Zee Marathi's third longest running soap opera. It starred Hardeek Joshi and Akshaya Deodhar in lead roles. It is produced by Smruti Shinde under the banner of Sobo Films. It premiered from 3 October 2016 by replacing Nanda Saukhya Bhare.

== Plot ==
The story revolves around the love story between Rana, a hardworking farmer from a rural area in Maharashtra and Anjali, an educated urban woman. Their relationship faces numerous challenges due to cultural differences, societal expectations and family opposition. Despite these obstacles, Rana and Anjali's love for each other continues to grow as they navigate the complexities of their relationship.

== Cast ==
=== Main ===
- Hardeek Joshi as Ranvijay Pratap Gaikwad (Ranada / Raja Rajgonda) (2016-2020)
  - Rudra Revankar as young Rana (2017)
- Akshaya Deodhar as Anjali Ranvijay Gaikwad / Anjali Dinkar Pathak (Pathak Bai / Jija) (2016-2020)

=== Recurring ===
Rana's family

- Dhanashri Kadgaonkar / Madhuri Pawar as Nandita Suraj Gaikwad / Nandita Uttamrao Jadhav (Taisaheb) (2016-2020)
- Raj Hanchanale as Suraj Pratap Gaikwad (Sunny) (2016-2020)
  - Siddhesh Khuperkar as young Suraj (2017)
- Chhaya Sangaokar as Godavari (Godakka) (2016-2020)
- Milind Dastane as Pratap Gaikwad (Aaba) (2016-2019)
- Dipti Sonawane as Chanda (2016-2020)
- Vagmee Shevade as Rajlaxmi Ranvijay Gaikwad (Lakshmi) (2019-2020)
- Shreyas Mohite as Yuvraj Suraj Gaikwad (2019-2020)
- Sandhya Manik as Madhuri Suraj Gaikwad / Madhuri Jawale (2019-2020)

Villagers

- Amol Naik as Barkat (2016-2020)
- Kalyani Jadhav as Radha (2016-2019)
- Rajveersingh Raje as Rajveer (Ladu) (2018-2019)
- Umesh Bolake as Bapu (2016-2020)
- Shruti Kulkarni as Renuka (2016-2019)
- Prafulla Gawas as Mr. Mahajan (2016-2020)
- Avadhut Joshi as Avadhoot (2016-2020)
- Abhishek Kulkarni as Paresh Patil (Papya) (2018-2020)
- Yogesh Kumar Powar as Bandya (2018-2020)
- Sanjeevkumar Patil as Nivrutti Naik (2019-2020)
- Neha Bam as Nandita's mother (2016-2020)
- Atul Sanas as Jayant (2017-2018)
- Prachi Godbole as Anjali's mother (2016-2019)
- Shivraj Walvekar / Balkrishna Shinde as Sangram Mohite (2020)

=== Guest appearances ===
- Chala Hawa Yeu Dya celebs (2019)
- Vikas Patil as Aditya Gore (2019)
- Rucha Apte as Sakhi (2018)
- Shriram Kolhatkar as Mr. Balsara (2018)
- Siddharth Jadhav (2018)
- Akshay Kumar as Jolly (2017)

== Awards ==
Zee Marathi Utsav Natyancha Awards
| Year | Category | Recipient | Role | Ref. |
|---|---|---|---|---|
| 2017 | Best Series | Sobo Films | | |
| 2017 | Best Family | | Gaikwad Family | |
| 2017 | Best Actor | Hardeek Joshi | Rana | |
| 2017 | Best Mother | Chhaya Sangaonkar | Godakka | |
| 2017 | Best Daughter-in-law | Akshaya Deodhar | Anjali | |
| 2017 | Best Father-in-law | Milind Dastane | Pratap | |
| 2018 | Best Couple | Hardeek Joshi-Akshaya Deodhar | Rana-Anjali | |
| 2018 | Best Child Character | Rajveersingh Raje | Ladu | |
| 2018 | Best Negative Actress | Dhanashri Kadgaonkar | Nandita | |
| 2018 | Best Daughter-in-law | Akshaya Deodhar | Anjali | |
| 2018 | Best Siblings | Hardeek Joshi-Raj Hanchnale | Rana-Suraj | |
| 2018 | Best Supporting Male | Amol Naik | Barkat | |
| 2019 | Best Child Character | Rajveersingh Raje | Ladu | |

== Adaptations ==
| Language | Title | Original release | Network(s) | Last aired | Notes |
|---|---|---|---|---|---|
| Marathi | Tujhyat Jeev Rangala तुझ्यात जीव रंगला | 3 October 2016 | Zee Marathi | 2 January 2021 | Original |
| Kannada | Jodi Hakki ಜೋಡಿ ಹಕ್ಕಿ | 13 March 2017 | Zee Kannada | 5 July 2019 | Remake |
| Tamil | Rekka Katti Parakkudhu Manasu றெக்கை கட்டி பறக்குது மனசு | 19 June 2017 | Zee Tamil | 24 May 2019 | Remake |
| Malayalam | Alliyambal അല്ലിയാമ്പൽ | 26 November 2018 | Zee Keralam | 9 November 2019 | Remake |
| Punjabi | Chhoti Jathani ਛੋਟੀ ਜਠਾਣੀ | 14 June 2021 | Zee Punjabi | 11 November 2022 | Remake |

== Reception ==
=== Seasons ===
- 22 June 2019 (2 years later)
- 27 October 2019 (6 years later)
- 17 August 2020 (6 months later)

=== Special episode ===
1 hour

- 25 December 2016
- 26 November 2017
- 22 July 2018
- 6 January 2019
- 27 October 2019
- 15 December 2019
- 1 November 2020

2 hours

- 5 March 2017 (Rana-Anjali's marriage)
- 19 August 2018 (Rana lost in Mumbai)
- 25 November 2018 (International Wrestling Competition)

=== Ratings ===
| Week | Year | BARC Viewership | | Ref. |
| Week | Year | TRP | Rank | Ref. |
|---|---|---|---|---|
| Week 42 | 2016 | 2.4 | 5 | |
| Week 47 | 2016 | 2.8 | 3 | |
| Week 12 | 2017 | 5.3 | 2 | |
| Week 15 | 2017 | 5.6 | 2 | |
| Week 17 | 2017 | 5.1 | 2 | |
| Week 23 | 2017 | 3.9 | 1 | |
| Week 27 | 2017 | 5.5 | 1 | |
| Week 31 | 2017 | 5.7 | 1 | |
| Week 37 | 2017 | 5.9 | 2 | |
| Week 49 | 2017 | 7.1 | 1 | |
| Week 15 | 2018 | 5.7 | 2 | |
| Week 19 | 2018 | 6.1 | 1 | |
| Week 34 | 2018 | 6.1 | 2 | |
| Week 35 | 2018 | 5.2 | 4 | |
| Week 37 | 2018 | 5.3 | 3 | |
| Week 38 | 2018 | 5.4 | 2 | |
| Week 40 | 2018 | 5.0 | 3 | |
| Week 41 | 2018 | 4.8 | 3 | |
| Week 42 | 2018 | 4.4 | 3 | |
| Week 43 | 2018 | 5.1 | 4 | |
| Week 44 | 2018 | 5.4 | 4 | |
| Week 45 | 2018 | 4.8 | 3 | |
| Week 46 | 2018 | 5.7 | 3 | |
| Week 47 | 2018 | 5.6 | 3 | |
| Week 48 | 2018 | 5.4 | 3 | |
| Week 49 | 2018 | 5.5 | 2 | |
| Week 50 | 2018 | 5.4 | 3 | |
| Week 51 | 2018 | 5.5 | 2 | |
| Week 52 | 2018 | 4.8 | 4 | |
| Week 1 | 2019 | 5.5 | 3 | |
| Week 2 | 2019 | 5.5 | 3 | |
| Week 3 | 2019 | 5.8 | 2 | |
| Week 4 | 2019 | 5.6 | 2 | |
| Week 5 | 2019 | 5.6 | 2 | |
| Week 14 | 2019 | 4.0 | 2 | |
| Week 16 | 2019 | 3.9 | 2 | |
| Week 17 | 2019 | 3.8 | 2 | |
| Week 21 | 2019 | 3.5 | 4 | |
| Week 23 | 2019 | 3.8 | 4 | |
| Week 25 | 2019 | 4.4 | 2 | |
| Week 26 | 2019 | 5.5 | 3 | |
| Week 27 | 2019 | 6.5 | 2 | |
| Week 28 | 2019 | 6.7 | 2 | |
| Week 29 | 2019 | 6.5 | 1 | |
| Week 30 | 2019 | 6.8 | 1 | |
| Week 31 | 2019 | 6.7 | 1 | |
| Week 32 | 2019 | 6.8 | 1 | |
| Week 34 | 2019 | 6.9 | 1 | |
| Week 35 | 2019 | 7.1 | 1 | |
| Week 36 | 2019 | 6.2 | 1 | |
| Week 37 | 2019 | 7.0 | 1 | |
| Week 38 | 2019 | 6.9 | 1 | |
| Week 39 | 2019 | 7.0 | 1 | |
| Week 50 | 2019 | 3.1 | 5 | |
| Week 52 | 2019 | 3.0 | 4 | |
| Week 36 | 2020 | 3.0 | 4 | |
