= Krishna Mukunda Murari =

Telugu-language drama TV series (2012-2024)

- Genre: Drama
- Starring: See below
- Country of origin: India
- Original language: Telugu
- No. of episodes: 491

Production
- Production locations: Hyderabad, Telangana, India
- Camera setup: Multi-camera
- Running time: 22 minutes

Original release
- Network: Star Maa
- Release: 1 October 2012 – 8 June 2024

Krishna Mukunda Murari is an Indian Telugu language drama television series that aired on Star Maa. It aired from 1 October 2012 to 8 June 2024, replacing Devatha - Anubandhala Alayam. The show is an official remake of Star Jalsha's television series Kusum Dola. It stars Prerana Kambam, Gagan Chinnappa/Madhusudhan and Yashmi Gowda in lead roles.

== Plot ==
Krishna, the sweet-natured, small-town police officer's daughter, resides in Tirumala. She recently earned her MBBS degree and intends to continue her education in surgery in Hyderabad. Everyone in her town is loved by her.

Murari is a future IPS officer who comes from a large family where everyone has diverse viewpoints. While travelling, Murari and Mukunda get romantically interested in one another but are unable to communicate their sentiments. Murari receives a temporary posting to Tirumala, but unintentionally loses his phone and is unable to reach Mukunda, leaving her feeling betrayed. She soon marries Adarsh, the brother of Murari.

== Cast ==
- Prerana Kambam as Dr. Krishnaveni aka Krishna – Chandrashekhar's daughter; Murari's wife.
  - Deshna as Child Krishna
- Gagan Chinnappa / Madhusudhan as IPS Murari/ ACP Sir – Revathi and Eshwar's son; Adarsh, Nandhini and Madhukar's cousin; Krishna's husband.
- Yashmi Gowda / Rashmi Prabhakar as Mukunda – Dev's sister; Murari's former love interest; Adarsh's wife.
- Priya as Bhavani – Eshwar and Prasad's sister-in-law; Adarsh and Nandhini's mother.
- Madhavi Latha as Revathi – Eshwar's wife; Murari's mother.
- Sai Mithra as Eshwar – Prasad's brother; Revathi's husband; Murari's father.
- Sriraj Balla as Prasad – Eshwar's brother; Sumalatha's husband; Madhukar's father.
- Sirisha as Sumalatha – Prasad's wife; Madhukar's mother.
- Amar Sasanka as Adarsh – Bhavani's son; Nandhini's brother; Murari and Madhukar's cousin; Mukunda's husband.
- Haritha Udaykumar as Nandhini – Bhavani's daughter; Adarsh's sister; Murari and Madhukar's cousin; Gautam's wife.
- Surya as Dr. Gautam Siddharth – Nandhini's husband; Krishna's professor.
- Sandeep Makham as Madhukar aka Madhu – Prasad and Sumalatha's son; Adarsh, Nandhini and Murari's cousin; Alekhya's husband.
- Siri Naidu / Shilpa as Alekhya – Madhukar's wife.
- Prabhakar as
  - Inspector Chandrashekhar – Prabhakar's brother; Krishna's father; Murari's former trainer.(Dead)
  - Prabhakar – Chandrashekhar's brother; Shakuntala's husband.
- Neeraja as Shakuntala – Prabhakar's wife.
- Viren Srinivas as Dev – Mukunda's brother.
- Krishna Reddy as Shiva
- Amrutha as Shiva's sister
- Gundra Srinivas Rao as Mukundha's father
- Sowjanya as Mukundha's mother
- Preetham as Gopi; Murari's best friend
- Hamsa Teju as Geethika; Mukunda's best friend
- Vijay Yadav as Police Officer
- Pallavi Gowda as Krishna's mother (died)
- Aadya Sharma as Murari's Aunt
- Sanyu Davalagar as Varun; Guest Appearance

== Adaptations ==
| Language | Title | Original Release | Network(s) | Last aired | Notes |
|---|---|---|---|---|---|
| Bengali | Kusum Dola কুসুম দোলা | 18 March 2013 | Star Jalsha | 2 September 2018 | Original |
| Tamil | Nenjam Marappathillai நெஞ்சம் மறப்பதில்லை | 9 October 2017 | Star Vijay | 23 February 2019 | Remake |
| Hindi | Ghum Hai Kisikey Pyaar Meiin गुम है किसी के प्यार में | 5 October 2020 | StarPlus | 27 June 2023 | Remake |
| Kannada | Marali Manasagide ಮರಳಿ ಮನಸಾಗಿದೆ | 9 August 2021 | Star Suvarna | 21 January 2023 | Remake |
| Marathi | Lagnachi Bedi लग्नाची बेडी | 31 January 2022 | Star Pravah | 15 December 2024 | Remake |
| Telugu | Krishna Mukunda Murari కృష్ణ ముకుంద మురారి | 31 May 2021 | Star Maa | 8 June 2024 | Remake |
| Malayalam | Chandrikayilaliyunna Chandrakantham ചന്ദ്രികയിലലിയുന്ന ചന്ദ്രകാന്തം | 20 November 2023 | Asianet | 23 May 2025 | Remake |
