= Daya (TV series) =

Indian television series

- Genre: Drama
- Story by: Dinesh Pallath
- Creative director: Gireesh Konni
- Starring: Pallavi Gowda; Sarath Das; Sandeep Mohan
- Country of origin: India
- Original language: Malayalam
- No. of episodes: 333

Production
- Production location: Trivandrum
- Camera setup: Multi-camera
- Running time: 22 minutes
- Production company: Endemol Shine

Original release
- Network: Star Asianet
- Release: 1 November 2021 – 26 November 2022

Related
- Bala Hanuman; Gorintaku

Daya: Chentheeyil Chaalicha Kumkumapottu is an Indian television drama series that premiered on 1 November 2021 on Asianet and digital platform Disney+ Hotstar. It was produced by Endemol Shine and stars Pallavi Gowda in the title role. The show talks about the social topic of Woman empowerment. The show aired its last episode on 26 November 2022.

== Synopsis ==
The show is about a bold lady named Daya. She does not fear anything and believes in taking on challenges head-on. She along with her mother, navigate life as they go through thick and thin together.

== Cast ==
- Pallavi Gowda as Daya Jeevan, Jeevan's wife, Kaithakkal Achuthan and Janaki's daughter
- Sarath Das as Sub Collector Rendeep IAS
  - Sayoojya's husband and Allimol's father.
- Sandeep Mohan as Jeevan, Daya's husband
  - MLA Chemberi Vishwanathan and Mallika's son
- Dayana Hameed as Sayoojya Rendeep
  - Rendeep's second wife
  - Kaithakkal Achuthan and Kamala's daughter
- Sreelakshmi as Janaki
- V.K.Baiju as Kaithakkal Achuthan
  - Daya, Sayoojya and Deepak's father
  - Kamala's husband
- John Jacob as Kaithakkal Deepak
  - Kaithakkal Achuthan and Kamala's son
  - Daya and Sayoojya's elder brother
- Reshmi Boban as Kamala
  - Kaithakkal Achuthan's wife
  - Deepak and Sayoojya's mother
- Baby Ester Evana Sherin as Allimol
  - Rendeep and Lekshmi's daughter
- Shyjan Sreevalsam as Panchayth Member Chanthunni a.k.a. "Onthunni"
- Prajusha as Maya
- Thirumala Ramachandran as Narayanan
- Ajith Vijayan as MLA Chemberi Vishwanathan
  - Jeevan's father
- Shobha Mohan as Mallika
  - Jeevan's Mother
- Nandhana as Aravi
- Amith as Harigovindhan
  - Rendeep's father-in-law
  - Lekshmi's father
- Sunil Vikram as Murukan
- Jaseela Parveen as Swarnalekha
- Sanuraj Sanu as Rocky
- Rajeev Pala
- T. P. Madhavan
- Rugmini Amma
- Stella Raja
- Lekshmy Nandan as Kajol
- Sreelekshmi Haridas
- Praveen Prem
- Kiran Iyer

== Reception ==
In a poll conducted on the official Instagram account of ETimes TV to pick the best entertainer between Daya: Chentheeyil Chalicha Kumkumapottu and Amma Makal, 78% of the respondents voted in favour of Daya.
