= Madhumita Sarcar =

Indian actress

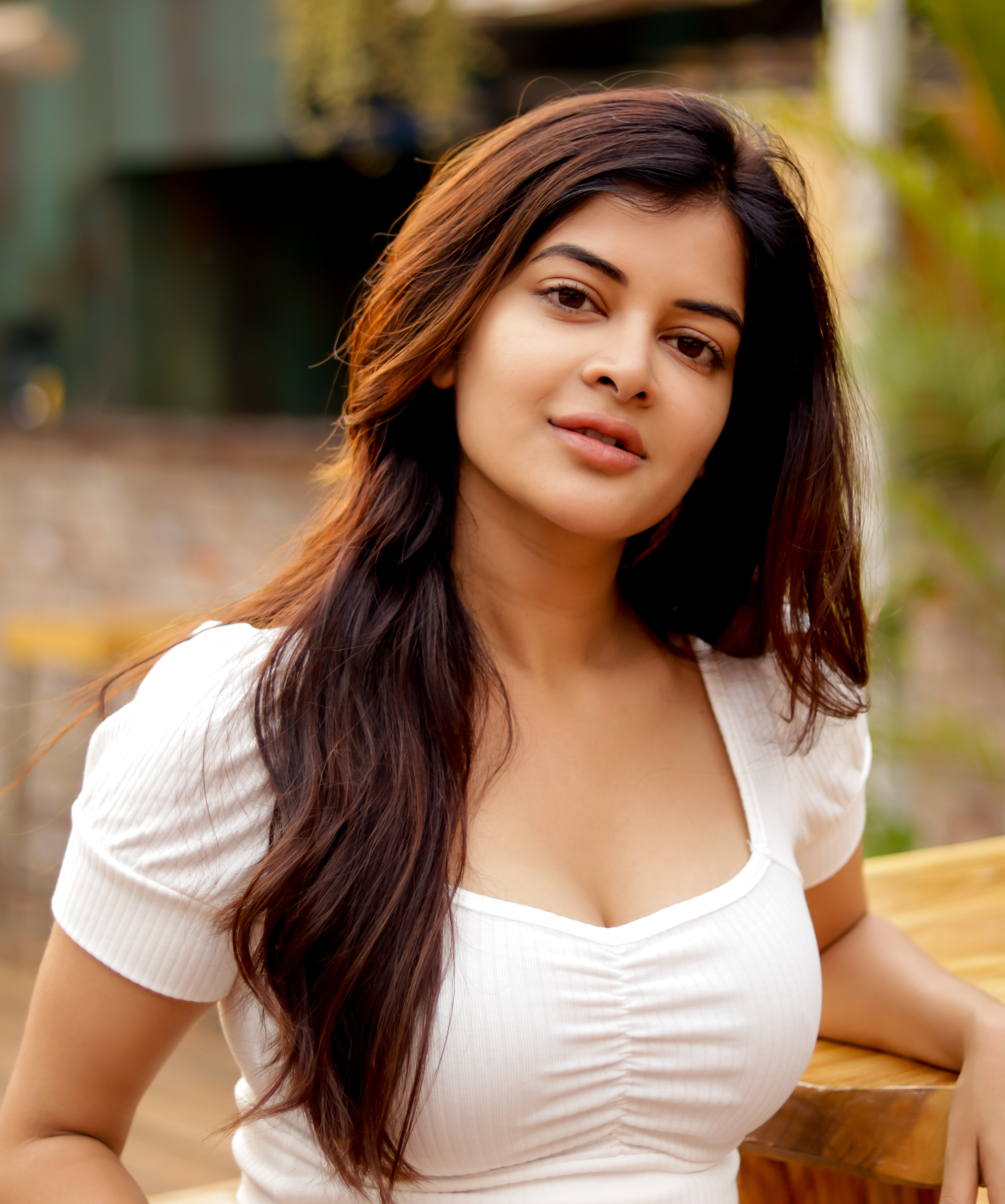
- Madhumita Sarcar
- Born: Baruipur, South 24 Parganas, West Bengal, India
- Occupation: Actress
- Years active: 2011–present
- Known for: Bojhena Se Bojhena; Kusum Dola

Madhumita Sarcar is an Indian actress who works primarily in Bengali films and television. She is best known for playing the lead roles of Pakhi Ghosh Dastidar Singha Roy in Bojhena Se Bojhena and Dr. Imon Mukherjee in Kusum Dola.

== Filmography ==
- All films are in Bengali unless mentioned.

Key
†	Denotes films that have not yet been released

List of film credits
Year	Title	Role	Notes	Ref.
2011	Paribartan	Sakshi	credited as Madhumita	
2020	Love Aaj Kal Porshu	Tista	credited as Madhumita	
2020	Cheeni	Cheeni		
2021	Tangra Blues	Joyee		
2022	Kuler Achaar	Mithi		
2023	Dilkhush	Pushpita		
2023	Cheeni 2	Cheeni		
2024	Surjo	Uma		
2025	Felubakshi	Debjani		
2025	Omorshongi		Special appearance	
2025	Shreeman v/s Shreemati	Amrita		
2026	Gulshan-er Chameli †	TBA	Filming; Debut in Bangladeshi film	

== Web series ==
List of web series credits
Year	Serial	Role	Platform
2022	Uttoron	Parna	Hoichoi
2022	Srikanto	Avie	Hoichoi
2023	Jaatishwar	Rupkatha	Hoichoi

== Television ==
List of television credits
Year	Serial	Character	Channel	Language	Production House
2011–12	Sobinoy Nibedon	Naina	Sananda TV	Bengali	Sphere Origins
2012–13	Care Kori Na	Jahnabi Mukherjee aka Juni	Star Jalsha	Bengali	Sphere Origins
2013–16	Bojhena Se Bojhena	Pakhi Ghosh Dastidar Singha Roy and Khushi (double role)	Star Jalsha	Bengali	Shree Venkatesh Films
2016	Meghbalika	Shreya	NTV Bangladesh	Bengali	-
2016–18	Kusum Dola	Dr. Imon Chatterjee (née Mukherjee)	Star Jalsha	Bengali	Magic Moments Motion Pictures
2025–26	Bhole Baba Par Kare Ga	Jhelum "Jheel"	Star Jalsha	Bengali	Magic Moments Motion Pictures

== Mahalaya ==
List of Mahalaya credits
Year	Serial	Character	Channel
2015	Akal Bodhon	Devi Sita	Star Jalsha
2017	Jagat Janani Durga	Devi Parvati	Star Jalsha
2019	Mahisasurmardini	Devi Mahisasurmardini	Star Jalsha
2020	Durga Durgatinashini	Devi Sita	Star Jalsha
2024	Ranong Dehi	Devi Koushiki	Star Jalsha

== Awards ==
Year	Award show	Category	Serial	Character
2014	Tele Somman Award	Best Actress	Bojhena Se Bojhena	Pakhi
2015	Star Jalsha Parivar Award 2015	Style Icon Female	Bojhena Se Bojhena	Pakhi
2015	Star Jalsha Parivar Award 2015	Priyo Juti	Bojhena Se Bojhena	Pakhi
2015	Star Jalsha Parivar Award 2015	Priyo Bou	Bojhena Se Bojhena	Pakhi
2016	Star Jalsha Parivar Award 2016	Priyo Bou	Bojhena Se Bojhena	Pakhi
2016	Star Jalsha Parivar Award 2016	Priyo Bon	Bojhena Se Bojhena	Pakhi
2016	Star Jalsha Parivar Award 2016	PC CHANDRA SONAMUKH	Bojhena Se Bojhena	Pakhi

== Music videos ==
List of music video credits
Year	Video	Singer	Composer	Co-actor	Music Label
2017	Polasher Bon Revisited	Musicity	Musicity	Musicity	SVF Music
2021	Amar Chalaki	Anupam Roy	Anupam Roy	Arjun Chakrabarty	SVF Music
2021	O Mon Re	Tanveer Evan	Piran Khan	Yash Dasgupta	SVF Music
