= Kidi (film) =

- Directed by: S. Raghu
- Story by: Rajesh Gopinathan
- Produced by: T. Nagraj; B. T. Mallikarjunaiah; Dhananjay R.
- Starring: Bhuvan Chandra; Pallavi Gowda; Danny Kuttappa
- Cinematography: Benaka Raju
- Edited by: Vishwa
- Music by: Emil Mohammed
- Production company: Master's Choice creations
- Distributed by: Mysore Talkies (Jack Manjunath)
- Release date: 6 October 2017
- Running time: 120 minutes
- Country: India
- Language: Kannada

Kidi (lit. 'Spark') is a 2017 Indian Kannada-language action thriller film starring Bhuvan Chandra, Pallavi Gowda, Danny Kuttappa and Ugrham Manju. It was directed by S. Raghu and produced by Master's Choice Creations. It is a remake of the 2016 Malayalam-language film Kali.

== Plot ==
Bhuvan (R Bhuvan Chandra), a man with anger management issues, tries to control his temper for the sake of his wife, Nandhini(Pallavi Gowda). However, things take a turn when they drive on a highway one night.

== Cast ==
- Bhuvan Chandra as Bhuvan
- Pallavi Gowda as Nandini
- Danny Kuttappa as Chuli
- Manmohan Roy as Shetty
- Ugramm Manju as Nagaanna
- Pavan K as Pavan
- Dakshaya as Young Bhuvan

== Music ==
The music is composed by Emil Mohammad, and the soundtrack was released on 3 June 2017 by Anand Audio.

No.	Title	Lyrics	Singer(s)	Length
1.	"Ondu Manavi"	Kaviraj	Karthik (singer)	5:10
2.	"Preethi Inda"	Lokesh J	Anuradha Bhat, Anirudh	4:40
3.	"Enee Kavana"	K. Kalyan	Sangeetha Ravindranath	5:10
4.	"Kidi Theme"	V. Nagendra Prasad	Chandan Shetty	3:20

== Reception ==
A critic from Firstpost wrote that "A remake doesn’t work with an extra song (shot in Thailand), or giving more muscles to the hero. It works in keeping its aesthetics intact. Raghu’s Kidi fails to do that. Furthermore, the leads don’t recreate the magic of togetherness that Dulquer Salmaan and Sai Pallavi did". A critic from Chitraloka.com gave a more positive review.
