= Bojhena Se Bojhena (TV series) =

2013 Bengali television series

- Genre: Drama; Romance; Comedy
- Screenplay by: Ashrunu; Praneeta
- Story by: Gul Khan
- Directed by: Soumik Chattapaddhay; Srijit Roy; Snehashish Jana; Abira Majumdar
- Starring: Yash Dasgupta; Madhumita Sarkar; Riju Biswas
- Country of origin: India
- Original language: Bengali
- No. of episodes: 822

Production
- Executive producers: Reshmi Roy (Star Jalsha); Lagna Ghosh (Star Jalsha)
- Producers: Shrikant Mohta; Mahendra Soni
- Production locations: Kolkata; Malda
- Cinematography: Tuban; Dipankar
- Editors: Sampreeti; Amit
- Running time: 22 minutes
- Production company: Shree Venkatesh Films

Original release
- Network: Star Jalsha
- Release: 4 November 2013 – 18 June 2016

Related
- Iss Pyaar Ko Kya Naam Doon?

Bojhena Se Bojhena (transl. They Don’t Understand) is an Indian Bengali-language romantic television soap opera that premiered on 4 November 2013 on Star Jalsha. Produced by Shree Venkatesh Films, the series is an official remake of the Hindi television series Iss Pyaar Ko Kya Naam Doon?, which aired on StarPlus. The show starred Yash Dasgupta and Madhumita Sarkar in the lead roles. Riju Biswas made an extended cameo appearance , portraying [Arnav].

The series concluded on 18 June 2016 after airing 822 episodes.

Due to its sustained popularity, the series was re-telecast multiple times. During the COVID-19 lockdown in 2020, it was re-aired on Star Jalsha as part of nostalgia programming. The show returned for another rerun in July 2023.

== Plot ==
Pakhi Ghosh Dastidar, a simple and traditional woman from Malda, crosses paths with Aranya Singha Roy, a wealthy and arrogant business magnate who has little faith in love or relationships. A misunderstanding between them leads to Pakhi’s public humiliation, forcing her family to relocate to Kolkata.

Pakhi later joins Aranya’s company, where conflicts gradually turn into emotional attachment. Several misunderstandings, conspiracies, and antagonists—including Krishnendu Sengupta—separate the couple repeatedly. Over time, Aranya and Pakhi confront deception, betrayal, and identity twists, including the introduction of Aranya’s lookalike Radhe.

After numerous obstacles, the truth is revealed, villains are punished, and the series concludes on a positive note with family reconciliations and marriages.

== Cast ==
=== Main ===
- Yash Dasgupta as Aranya Singha Roy / Radhe
- Madhumita Sarkar as Pakhi Ghosh Dastidar Singha Roy / Khushi Pratap
- Koushik Roy / Manoj Ojha as Krishnendu Sengupta

=== Recurring ===
- Tania Kar as Piu Banik Singha Roy
- Abhishek Bose as Arko “Akki” Singha Roy
- Debaparna Chakraborty as Ananya “Anu” Singha Roy Sengupta
- John Bhattacharya as Hariharan “Harry” Singh
- Reshmi Sen as Sumitra Banik
- Anuradha Roy as Ranibala Singha Roy
- Samrat Mukherjee as Raj Majumdar
- Dolon Roy as Mrs. Pratap

=== Special appearances ===
- Soham Chakraborty
- Koel Mallick
- Prosenjit Chatterjee
- Mimi Chakraborty
- Srabanti Chatterjee and Sayantika Banerjee
- Arjun Chakrabarty

== Reception ==
Bojhena Se Bojhena received strong audience response and won multiple awards. The series won several honours at the Tele Samman Awards in 2015.
