= Jodi Hakki (TV series) =

Kannada language drama TV series

- Genre: Drama
- Starring: See below
- Country of origin: India
- Original language: Kannada
- No. of episodes: 621

Production
- Production locations: Bengaluru, Karnataka, India
- Camera setup: Multi-camera
- Running time: 22 minutes

Original release
- Network: Zee Kannada
- Release: 13 March 2017 – 5 July 2019

Related
- Tujhyat Jeev Rangala

Jodi Hakki is an Indian Kannada language drama series which aired on Zee Kannada. The show is an official remake of Marathi TV series Tujhyat Jeev Rangala. It stars Chaithra Rao and Thandav Ram in lead roles. It premiered from 13 March 2017 and ended on 5 July 2019 completing 621 episodes.

== Plot ==
It revolves around the romance and relation between Rama and Janaki. Rama is a wrestler who's too shy to talk to women, while Janaki is a confident teacher. Their different mindset, upbringing and lifestyle makes their love story sweet and complicated at the same time.

== Cast ==
- Chaithra Rao as Janaki
- Thandav Ram as Rama
- Pallavi Gowda as Nanditha

== Adaptations ==
| Language | Title | Original release | Network(s) | Last aired | Notes |
|---|---|---|---|---|---|
| Marathi | Tujhyat Jeev Rangala तुझ्यात जीव रंगला | 3 October 2016 | Zee Marathi | 2 January 2021 | Original |
| Kannada | Jodi Hakki ಜೋಡಿ ಹಕ್ಕಿ | 13 March 2017 | Zee Kannada | 5 July 2019 | Remake |
| Tamil | Rekka Katti Parakkudhu Manasu றெக்கை கட்டி பறக்குது மனசு | 19 June 2017 | Zee Tamil | 24 May 2019 | Remake |
| Malayalam | Alliyambal അല്ലിയാമ്പൽ | 26 November 2018 | Zee Keralam | 9 November 2019 | Remake |
| Punjabi | Chhoti Jathani ਛੋਟੀ ਜਠਾਣੀ | 14 June 2021 | Zee Punjabi | 11 November 2022 | Remake |
