= Marali Manasagide =

Indian television series

- Genre: Drama
- Written by: Shreenidhi
- Directed by: Satish Krishna
- Creative director: Prashanth Belagatti
- Starring: Divya Wagukar; Chandan Kumar; Shilpa Shetty
- Country of origin: India
- Original language: Kannada
- No. of episodes: 428

Production
- Producers: Prashanti Malisetti; Prashanth Belagatti
- Cinematography: Mandya Manju
- Running time: 22 minutes
- Production company: Pixel Pictures Private Limited

Original release
- Network: Star Suvarna
- Release: 9 August 2021 – 21 January 2023

Related
- Kusum Dola

Marali Manasagide is an Indian Kannada language drama on Star Suvarna which premiered from 9 August 2021. The show is an official remake of Star Jalsha's TV series Kusum Dola. The show stars Divya Wagukar, Chandan Kumar and Shilpa Shetty.

== Plot ==
Spandana is a young, courageous, and outspoken woman, who aspires to become an engineer and resides with her father Ramachandra. On the other hand, Vikranth Nayak, an aspiring IPS officer, meets Vaishnavi, a free-spirited girl on a trip where both of them fall in love with each other. At the end of the trip, he gets a call stating that he has been selected as an IPS officer. Vikranth leaves the trip and Vaishnavi to appoint to his job. At his oath-taking ceremony, he meets Spandana and her father Ramachandra, who is Vikranth's senior officer. Later, Vikranth's cousin Shamanth marries Vaishnavi due to uncertain circumstances. Later, Spandana marries Vikranth due to the promise Vikranth gave to her father. After the marriage, Vikranth tells Spandana not to expect any love from him as he has already given his love for Vaishnavi who is now his sister-in-law. How Vikranth and Spandana fall in love forms the rest of the story.

== Cast ==
=== Main ===
- Divya Wagukar as Spandana Ramachandra: Vikranth's wife and Ramachandra's daughter
- Chandan Kumar as ASP Vikranth Nayak: Spandana's husband
- Shilpa Shetty as Vaishnavi: Vikranth's love interest who later becomes Shamanth's wife

=== Recurring ===
- Vinay Gowda as Major Shamanth: Vikranth's cousin and Vaishnavi's husband
- Harini Sreekanth / Nandini Gowda as Sujatha: Vikranth's mother and Spandana's mother-in-law
- Mareena Thara as Chandrakala: Ananth Kumar Nayak's elder sister-in-law
- Anikha Sindhya as Kavana: Vikranth and Shamanth's aunt
- Akshitha Sathyanarayana as Panchami, Gaurav’s wife; Vikrant’s cousin-in-law
- Srinath Vasishta as Retd. Major Alok Kumar Nayaka: Vikranth's father and Spandana's father-in-law
- Ashok Sharma as Bhavani Shankar: MLA Gopinath's son; Spandana's one-sided obsessive lover
- Arvind Rao as DSP Ramachandra: Spandana's father and Vikranth's mentor and colleague

== Soundtrack ==
The title song for the series Marali Manasaagide has been sung by singer Sinchana Chandan, Aishwarya Rangarajan and Jubin Paul. The original music has been given by Karthik Sharma.

Marali Manasaagide Soundtrack:
No.	Title	Lyrics	Singer	Length
1.	"Marali Manasaagide Title Song"	Harshapriya	Sinchana Chandan, Aishwarya Rangarajan, Jubin Paul	1:56
Total length:				1:56

== Production ==
The show marks the comeback of actor Chandan to serials after a brief gap. The shows title track was shot in Bengaluru and the show is being filmed in Bengaluru.The opening episodes were shot in picturesque locations in Gokarna and Tumkur.

== Adaptations ==
Language	Title	Original Release	Network(s)	Last aired	Notes
Bengali	Kusum Dola কুসুম দোলা	22 August 2016	Star Jalsha	2 September 2018	Original
Tamil	Nenjam Marappathillai நெஞ்சம் மறப்பதில்லை	9 October 2017	Star Vijay	23 February 2019	Remake
Hindi	Ghum Hai Kisikey Pyaar Meiin गुम है किसी के प्यार में	5 October 2020	StarPlus	27 June 2023	Remake
Kannada	Marali Manasagide ಮರಳಿ ಮನಸಾಗಿದೆ	9 August 2021	Star Suvarna	21 January 2023	Remake
Marathi	Lagnachi Bedi लग्नाची बेडी	31 January 2022	Star Pravah	15 December 2024	Remake
Telugu	Krishna Mukunda Murari కృష్ణ ముకుంద మురారి	14 November 2022	Star Maa	8 June 2024	Remake
Malayalam	Chandrikayilaliyunna Chandrakantham ചന്ദ്രികയിലലിയുന്ന ചന്ദ്രകാന്തം	20 November 2023	Asianet	Ongoing	Remake
