= Care Kori Na =

Indian Bengali TV series

- Genre: Drama; Romance; Thriller
- Written by: Srabasti Basu; Pramita Sengupta; Amitava Bhattacharyay; Prasenjit Maity
- Directed by: Anindo Banerjee; Tamal Maity
- Starring: Farhan Imroze; Madhumita Sarkar; Saayoni Ghosh; Rohit Mukherjee
- Country of origin: India
- Original language: Bengali
- No. of episodes: 203

Production
- Producers: Sunjoy Wadhawa; Comall Sunjoy W.
- Cinematography: Sandip Das
- Editor: Suvojit Halder
- Camera setup: Multi-camera
- Running time: 22 minutes
- Production company: Sphere Origins

Original release
- Network: Star Jalsha
- Release: 16 July 2012 – 9 March 2013

Related
- Tomay Amay Mile

Care Kori Na is an Indian Bengali romance television series that premiered on 16 June 2012 on the channel Star Jalsha. The last episode was aired on 9 March 2013. Farhan Imroze and Madhumita SarKar. The last episode aired on 9 March 2013. Farhan Imroze and Madhumita SarKar play the lead roles of Krishnendu Sengupta and Juni (Jahnnabi Mukherjee) respectively.

== Plot ==
Krishnendu is a brilliant, honest but short-tempered 3rd year medical student from a very poor family who is studying at the prestigious BIMS (Bengal Institute of Medical Science) near Kolkata. Juni is an arrogant, spoiled daughter of the renowned and influential cardiothoracic surgeon Samaresh Mukherjee. Juni joins BIMS as a first year student. Being raised in a rich and influential family, the rude reality of hostel life at BIMS made her situation very bad.

A sequence of events unfolded dramatically that made Krishnendu and Juni enemies, and at the same time other separate incidents made Samaresh furious with Krishnendu. When Malabika (Juni's mother) saw Krishnendu for the first time, she found him strikingly similar to their old acquaintance Saradindu Sengupta. She secretly investigates, and comes to find out that Krishnendu is the son of Saradindu and Khuku-di (Kanika Sengupta).

Meanwhile, slowly Juni realizes the good qualities of Krishnedu's character, and she begins to like him. They become friends. During this period, it was revealed to the audience that Saradindu is sentenced to 14 years in prison, which Samaresh was responsible for (this fact is not known to Krishnendu). Malabika meets Krishnendu secretly at the Principal (Mr Banerjee)'s office and requests him not to have contact with Juni anymore, as it could be harmful to both Juni and Krishnendu. Krishnedu begins to avoid Juni.

The day Samaresh slapped and insulted Krishnendu at a party (to which Samaresh's family was invited and Krishnendu was working as a waiter to earn money to pay for his exam fees), Juni expressed her love for Krishnendu. However, Krishnendu refused. Juni tried sometimes in weird and innovative ways to make Krishnendu understand her true love for him. Finally, Krishnendu relents and accepts her love.

In the meantime, Samaresh meets Dr. Kripalani (the hospital superintendent who doesn't like Krishnendu at all) and promised him the Principal's post if he can finish Krishnedu's career. Dr. Kripalani involved Meghna (a second year student and grand daughter of the famous and influential Dr. Subol Majumdar) in his evil plan to frame Krishnedu and defame his character. Meghna requested Krishnendu's help in her study and met him at a secluded place and pretended to be sick all on a sudden. When Krishnendu tried to help her, a photographer hired by Kriplani took some deceptively intimate photographs of Krishnendu and Meghna. As soon as Krishnendu understood that he had been framed he left the place hurriedly and was hit by a speeding car! He was admitted in critical condition to BIMS hospital. Juni requested everybody to conceal Krishnedu's identity so that Samaresh can operate Krishnendu and save his life. In the meantime, Ronit (a newly appointed doctor at BIMS) joined hand with Meghna so that Juni and Krishnendu could be separated from each other. When Kanika discovered that Samaresh is Juni's father, she asked Krishnendu not to keep any relation with Juni any more. Ranit conspired with Meghna and showed Krishnendu and Meghna's intimate photos to Juni, which filled her heart with hatred for Krishnendu and decides to marry Ronit. Kanika's illness brought Juni and Krishnendu together again, and finally Krishnendu proved her innocence to Juni by showing a video that was shot along with the photographs by the same person. Juni blackmailed her mother Malabika to confess that Samaresh lied in the court to send Saradindu in to jail for rape and attempt to murder of nurse Arunima who was working in the same Blue Paradise Nurshing home where Saradindu and Samaresh were working as doctors. Juni started investigating on her own the truth behind Saradindu's conviction. Samaresh, Dr. Kriplani and Ronit framed Krishnedu again while he flouted hospital norms my treating an injured person (father of a student of BIMS) when no doctors were available. And Krishnendu was expelled from BIMS. All the students of BIMS protested against Krishnendu's rustication and were arrested as they sat on a hunger strike. At that point, being desperate to save Krishnedu's career, Juni struck a deal with Meghna and promised to go out of Krishnendu's life for ever. Meghna requested her grandpa Subol Majumdar, who used his influence to get Krishnendu back to BIMS once again and finally Meghna and Krishnendu became good friends. Subol Majumdar, who is respected by all, had some evil plans as well. At Subol's quarter Krishnedu got a letter written by Arunima with the allegation that Saradindu raped and tried to kill Arunima and because of this offence Saradindu is serving the jail sentence, that fills Krishnendu's heart with hatred for his father Saradindu. Juni's weird behaviour (of distancing herself from Krishnedu) and hatred for his own father, made Krishnendu almost insane.

Being released from jail after 14 years, Saradindu kidnapped Juni so that Samaresh confess to him about why did he lie against him before the court. Samaresh again lied and put the entire blame on Dr. Chandranath (Ronit's father). When Saradindu confronts Chandranath, a sniper killed him and every body thought Saradindu murdered Chandranath to take revenge. Juni compels Samaresh to confess to Krishnendu that Saradindu is completely innocent. Juni, Krishnendu and Samaresh visits a mental asylum where Arunima is being treated since the brutal attack on her. Malabika eavesdropped Samaresh's phone conversation and informed Juni and Krishnendu that Arunima will be killed that night in the asylum. Krishnendu, Juni and Meghna rescued Arunima and brought her to Subol's residence thinking it to be the safest place. Arunima was extremely scared when she saw Subol. When Krishnendu, Juni and Meghna left for BIMS, Subol tried to Kill Arunima; but Arunima fled from the house. Saradindu rescued her from the street and took her to his secret hiding. When Saradindu confronts Samaresh once again to extract the truth, Subol's goons shoot at Samaresh and Samaresh was admitted to BIMS. Subol finds out Saradindu's secret hiding and came to kill Arunima. Finally it was revealed that Subol is the main culprit and Arunima is Meghna's mother! Everybody (Juni, Krishnendu, Meghna, Arunima, Krishnendu's family, Juni's family) escaped from Subol's clutches and took shelter at Principal's residence at Kolkata. Meghna confessed to Krishnendu about the deal she had with Juni. Saradindu called Subol and told him that they are willing to meet him and surrender before him to have a peace deal! While talking to Subol, Saradindu tricked him to confess all his crimes which was secretly recorded by Krishnendu in his mobile phone. When all the evidence against Subol was aired on TV, police arrested Subol. While taking him to the police van, Subol got hold of a gun and killed Arunima and police shot Subol to death. Meghna donated all of Subol's property to BIMS and left BIMS along with Ronit and finally Samaresh accepts and arranges Krishnedu and Juni's marriage after they finished their study to become doctors.

== Cast ==
- Farhan Imroze as Krishnendu Sengupta
- Madhumita Sarkar as Jannhabi Mukherjee aka Juni
- Rohit Mukherjee as Juni's father Samaresh Mukherjee
- Dolon Roy as Malabika Mukherjee
- Arindam Sil as Krishnendu's father Saradindu Sengupta
- Baishakhi Marjit as Krishnendu's mother Kanika Sengupta
- Saayoni Ghosh as Meghna Majumdar
- Dulal Lahiri as Dr. Subol Majumdar
- Kunal Padhy as Dr. Kriplani
- B.D. Mukherjee as Principal
- Tathagata Mukherjee as Ronit
- Saswati Guha Thakurta as Dr. Sen
- Anindya Banerjee as (ACP Yunus Khan)
