= Nisha Ravikrishnan =

Indian Kannada film actress

- Born: 9 June 2000 (age 26); Sakaleshpura, Hassan, Karnataka
- Education: B.Com
- Alma mater: Aditi Public School(high school) SJBCMS(B.Com)
- Occupation: Actress
- Years active: 2018–present

Nisha Ravikrishnan, also known as Nisha Milana, is an actress in the Kannada television. She began her career in television during her school days. She hosted diverse programs on Chintu Television. Her debut as an actress came with the serial Sarvamangala Mangalye. After working for a few months in Sarvamangala Mangalye, she got an opportunity to play a lead role in the serial Gattimela on Zee Kannada.

== Life and career ==
Ravikrishnan used to perform stage plays with the Mandya Ramesh's team. Inspired by her father, she started taking interest in stage plays and cultural activities. She is trained in Carnatic music and Bharatanatyam. She hosted her debut programme on Chintu Television during her school days. She was seen as back dancer (Bharatanatyam Dancer) in a song named 'Nee Nanagoskara' of Kannada film Ishtakamya. Her first opportunity as an actor came through Sarva Mangala Managalye, a serial on Star Suvarna where she portrayed the role of lead character sister. After working for a few years in supporting roles, she got an opportunity as the lead actress in Gattimela opposite Rakksh of Putta Gowri Maduve fame.

== Recognitions ==
Nisha Ravikrishnan was included in the Bengaluru Times Most Desirable Women in Television list for 2019, where she was noted for her performance as Amulya in Gattimela. She was again included in the Bangalore Times Most Desirable Women on TV list for 2020, with the publication noting the popularity of her lead role in Gattimela.

== Filmography ==
=== Television ===
Year	Program	Role	Language	Channel	Notes
2018–2019	Sarvamangala Mangalye	Nithya	Kannada	Star Suvarna	
2019–2024	Gattimela	Amulya	Kannada	Zee Kannada	
2021–2022	Muthyamantha Muddu	Geetha	Telugu	Zee Telugu	
2022-2025	Ammayigaru	Apuroopa	Telugu	Zee Telugu	
2024–present	Annayya	Dr Parvathi	Kannada	Zee Kannada	

=== Films ===
†	Denotes films that have not yet been released

Year	Film	Role	Language	Notes	Ref.
2024	Anshu	Dhriti	Kannada	Female Centric Psychedelic thriller	
2025	Andondittu Kaala	Saakshi	Kannada	Romantic Drama	
†	Darshana	Preethi	Kannada	Dark Comedy	

== Awards ==
Year	Nominated work	Category	Award	Result	Notes	Ref.
2019	Gattimela	Favourite Actor in Lead Role (Female)	Zee Kannada Kutumba Awards	Won	Received from Bharathi Vishnuvardhan	
2019	Gattimela	Favourite Jodi (with Rakksh)	Zee Kannada Kutumba Awards	Won	Received from Sathish Ninasam	
2020	Gattimela	Best Actor in Lead Role (Female)	Zee Kannada Kutumba Awards	Won	Received from Dhananjay	
2020	Gattimela	Popular Jodi (with Rakksh)	Zee Kannada Kutumba Awards	Won	Received from Ramji, Arooru Jagdish	
2021	Gattimela	Favorite Actor in Lead Role (Female)	Zee Kannada Kutumba Awards	Won	Received from Malashri	
2021	Gattimela	Popular Jodi (with Rakksh)	Zee Kannada Kutumba Awards	Won	Received from Shiva Rajkumar	
2022	Gattimela	Favorite Actor in Lead Role (Female)	Zee Kannada Kutumba Awards	Won	Received from Sparsha Rekha	
2022	Gattimela	Popular Jodi (with Rakksh)	Zee Kannada Kutumba Awards	Won	Received from Darling Krishna, Milana Nagaraj	
2023	Gattimela	Popular Jodi (with Rakksh)	Zee Kannada Kutumba Awards	Won	Received from Director Prem and Rakshitha	
2023	Ammayigaru	Uttama Kuturu (Best Daughter)	Zee Telugu Kutumbam Awards	Won		
2023	Ammayigaru	Best Chemistry	Zee Telugu Kutumbam Awards	Won		
2024	Ammayigaru	Romantic Couple	Zee Telugu Kutumbam Awards	Won		
2024	Annayya	Zee Kanmani	Zee Kannada Kutumba Awards	Won	Received from Milana Nagaraj	
2025	Annayya	Best Actress	Zee Kannada Kutumba Awards	Won	Received from Upendra	
2025	Annayya	Best Jodi	Zee Kannada Kutumba Awards	Won	Received from Darling Krishna, Milana Nagaraj	
2025	Ammayigaru	Favourite Jodi	Zee Telugu Kutumbam Awards	Won		
