= Gattimela =

2018 Indian Kannada language TV series

- Genre: Drama
- Written by: Nischitha Sharath
- Screenplay by: Chetana vasishta (March 2019-Jan 2021); Kavya Rao (Jan 2021-Jan 2024)
- Directed by: Yatish NMS Gowda
- Starring: Rakksh; Nisha Ravikrishnan; Sudha Narasimharaju; Abhishek Das
- Theme music composer: Manikanth Kadri
- Opening theme: Gattimela idu Gattimela
- Country of origin: India
- Original language: Kannada
- No. of episodes: 1245

Production
- Executive producer: Ganapathi Bhat
- Producers: Joni Harsha; Rakksh
- Cinematography: Kumar Mandya; Guru Prasad
- Editor: Lokesh Shivaratna
- Camera setup: Multi-camera
- Running time: 22 minutes
- Production company: Sri Sai Anjaneya Company

Original release
- Network: Zee Kannada
- Release: 11 March 2019 – 5 January 2024

Gattimela is a 2019 Indian Kannada-language television soap opera that aired on Zee Kannada. The series is directed by Koramangala Anil. It premiered on 11 March 2019. The show is an official remake of Telugu TV series Varudhini Parinayam. One of the longest running Kannada television soap opera, the series stars Rakksh and Nisha Ravikrishnan. It was the most-watched daily soap on Kannada television in 2020.

== Plot ==
The story revolves around three families: Shridhar and Suhasini Vashishta's family, Manjunath and Parimala Manjunath's family, and Ashwath and Padma Ashwath's family. Vedanth Vashishta, Vikranth Vashishta, and Aadya are children of Shridhar and Suhasini. Vedanth does not like girls and does not believe in marriage due to a troubled past. Padma Ashwath is the sister of Parimala. Her children are Sarthak and Sarika. Aarthi, Amulya, Aditi, and Anjali are the daughters of Parimala. The Vashishta family is very rich. The Ashwath family is also rich while the Manjunaths are a typical middle-class family.

The story starts with Aadya and Sarthak's marriage ceremony. In the marriage, Vikranth meets and falls in love with Aarthi because she was similar to a girl who used to appear in his dreams. Sarika, who loves Vikranth, plots and causes Parimala and her family to be humiliated, to belittle them in the eyes of Vashishtas. Aarthi's parents fix her marriage with a man named Gowtham. Vikranth attempts suicide after getting the news. Vedanth decides to get Vikranth married to Aarthi, and joins efforts with Amulya for this. Vedanth and Amulya hate each other and are constantly fighting. Amulya and Sarika join Vedanth's office as his employees. With time, Vedanth learns that Gowtham is a criminal, but fails to prove this despite repeated attempts. Finally, on the day of Aarthi-Gowtham's marriage, Vedanth successfully reveals Gowtham's real identity. The love between Aarthi and Vikranth is no more a secret. After initial disturbances and misunderstandings, Vedanth ensures that both families agree to the marriage of Aarthi and Vikranth.

Suhasini does not like Aarthi and Vikranth's marriage due to Aarthi's middle class status, but is unable to directly refuse Vedanth. So she places a condition that Vikranth's marriage cannot happen unless Vedanth also agrees for marriage. Everyone tries to convince Vedanth for marriage but he does not agree. During this time, Suhasini's mother Vyjayanthi comes to the Vashishta house, and Aadya accidentally tells her that Amulya is Vedanth's girlfriend. Vedanth asks Amulya to act as his girlfriend till Vikranth and Aarthi's marriage.

During this period of drama as boyfriend and girlfriend, Amulya starts getting attracted to Vedanth. Vedanth and Amulya go for a picnic with their siblings and Vyjayanthi. Their acting convinces Vyjayanthi that they truly love each other. However, Amulya starts imagining Vedanth everywhere, and slowly realizes that she is really in love with him. Dhruva, who is the younger brother of Vedanth, is now introduced into the story. Vedanth and Suhasini are furious on seeing him.

Amulya calls Vedanth and tells him that she can't act as his girlfriend any more because she wants to be his real girlfriend. Vedanth misunderstands her and to everyone's surprise, he introduces his employee Sahithya as his girlfriend. Amulya is shattered when she hears Vedanth's decision. She confesses her love for Vedanth under the influence of alcohol, but he disregards it due to her being drunk. It is revealed that Vedanth has asked Sahithya to act as his girlfriend until Vikranth's marriage, and it remained a secret between them.

Marriage preparations start for Aarthi and Vikranth. Vedanth and Amulya grow closer during this period. On the reception day, Suhasini announces Vedanth's engagement with Sahithya. Everyone is shocked by this development. Sahithya has by now developed feelings for Vedanth, and wants to marry him. Amulya dreams that Vedanth stops this and gets engaged to her instead. She is heartbroken to witness Vedanth's engagement and cries her heart out to him. Vedanth is concerned at her unusual behavior, and seems to slowly start developing feelings for Amulya.

On the day of Vikranth-Aarthi's marriage, Sarika kidnaps Aarthi and takes her place as the bride, stepping on stage with her face covered. Aadya and Amulya find this out and inform Vedanth. He takes Dhruva's help to bring Aarthi back to the marriage hall. Vedanth replaces Sarika with Aarthi, and Vikranth is successfully married to Aarthi. Vedanth brings out Sarika's wrongdoings in front of everyone and has her kicked out of their lives. Vedanth finds things he has given to Amulya at different points of time kept carefully by her and confronts her about it. Amulya helplessly confesses her love to Vedanth once again, but later out of fear of rejection lies that she only loves him as a friend.

Vedanth is slowly understanding his feelings for Amulya. In this period, Suhasini plans to fix Vedanth and Sahithya's marriage. However, Vedanth reveals to everyone that he and Sahithya were just acting for the sake of Vikranth's marriage, and breaks his engagement with Sahithya. Everyone is delighted except Suhasini. Vedanth and Amulya decide to meet and confess their feelings for each other. But on the same day, Vedanth is blackmailed and kidnapped by a politician Kishan, who turns out to be Sahithya's brother. Vikranth, Dhruva and Amulya join hands to rescue Vedanth. Vedanth beats up Kishan and gets him and Sahithya arrested.

Vedanth and Aryavardhan (Jothe Jotheyali serial on Zee Kannada) come together for a business collaboration. They also celebrate the festival of Ganesh Chaturthi together with their respective families. There is a bomb scare in which Aryavardhan and Amulya are caught, and Vedanth saves them by defusing the bomb. Vedanth and Amulya decide to meet once again in his office to confess their feelings for each other. But Dhruva reaches the office at that time, interrupting them. Vedanth is furious on seeing Dhruva and kicks him out. He finds out that Dhruva is living with the Manjunaths. Vedanth is furious at Amulya, causing her to resign from his company. Later, she follows him to a temple, and is ecstatic and overwhelmed to overhear him confessing his feelings for her. Vedanth finds poetry written by Amulya about him at her house, and realizes that Amulya loves him and wants to marry him. With Aadya's help, Amulya decides to confess her feelings to Vedanth when they are alone. She decorates his house and cooks for him. She makes multiple attempts to express her love to Vedanth but he teases her and does not let her. Finally, Vedanth romantically confesses his feelings to Amulya, and she happily reciprocates.

Vedanth and Amulya are now in a relationship, and they decide not to let anyone from their families know about this yet. Anjali becomes matured, and Vedanth convinces the Manjunath family to hold a ritual for her, as per Parimala's wish. He also starts a new business venture to spread more awareness in society and support women. Simultaneously, Suhasini has been causing misunderstandings between Vikranth and Aarthi.

So, to make them reunited again. The family plans for an outing where they both can confess their mistakes and reunite again. So they went to a restaurant where they arranged a Cricket game to entertainment. There Dhruva and Vedanth get into one team where their bonding was getting more tight. On the other hand, even Aarti and Vikki also confess their mistakes and take her to his house. So now Adya is trying to find out whether Amulya and Vedanth have confessed their love as they decide not to tell the house for some days, where she is succeeded after many tries but Adya tells she will be not telling the house until they themselves inform it.

Parimala and Manjunath think of establishing a small canteen at their home. At the opening day some goons attack the canteen and Amulya is hurt. The Trio (Dhruva, Vedanth, and Amulya) then outsmart the goons. One day when Vedanth and Amulya meet at her house Radha watches them and makes a scene at Amulya's house. For the prestige of their family Parimala asks a promise from Amulya that she shouldn't love or marry rich guy. With devastated heart she gives the promise to Parimala. So due to the promise Amulya avoids Vedanth.

While here Vikrant attends the phone call of the blackmailer of Sridhar and he goes to the blackmailer with Aarti. He learns the reason of abandoning Dhruva from their house and Suhasini's real motive and Vedanth not being his own brother. While here as Amulya is avoiding Vedanth he hatches a plan to propose Amulya as he was about to Vikranth comes to that area and in fear of revealing of truth Paramananda attacks Vikranth causing him to be in coma. While in hospital Paramananda on Suhasini's orders plans to kill Vikranth. While Amulya hears it he and the nurse boy attacks Amulya who is saved by Vedanth. After several attempts made by Amulya and the family he gets out of coma. When Amulya says Dhruva and Vedanth reunited he regains conscious. Vikranth vows to save Vedanth. Vedanth reveals his concern regarding Amulya to Aadya. When Vedanth says that he gives the land which Suhasini wanted in the name of child of Aadya and Sarthak she plans to kill the unborn child in which she succeeded. At office Vikranth sees Amulya warning Suhasini as she insults Parimala so he thinks that Amulya is correct person to teach Suhasini a lesson.

When Vedanth wanted to propose Amulya he knows her dream of visiting Taj Mahal. So Vikranth hatches a fake business trip to Taj Mahal. After several attempts of Aadya, Vikranth and Vedanth he proposes her in front of Taj Mahal which is seen by Parimala and Manjunath and takes Amulya from there. Next day when the family visits Taj Mahal the family reveals Vedanth's plan to surprise her and her parents accepted their relationship. When Vedanth proposes Amulya. She teases the family and then happily accepts the proposal.Later, on the occasion of her birthday, Suhasini hosts a party only to humiliate Parimala and Manjunath about their family status. Enraged and insulted, after getting to know about Suhasini's plan, Parimala calls off the wedding much to Vedanth and Amulya's dismay.

== Cast ==
=== Main ===
- Rakksh as Vedanth Vasishtha
- Nisha Ravikrishnan as Amulya Vedanth Vasishtha (née Manjunath)

=== Recurring ===
- Sudha Narasimharaju as Parimala Manjunath
- Ravi Kalabrahma as Manjunath: Aarathi, Amulya, Adithi and Anjali's father
- Ruthu/Archana Krishappa/Swathi HV/Sindhu Kalyan as Suhasini Vashishta: Vedanth's Aunt/Adoptive mother
- Swathi as Vaidehi: Vedanth, Vikrant, Dhruva and Aadya's Biological mother
- Ravi Kiran as Suryanarayana Vasishta: Vedanth, Vikranth, Dhruva, Aadya's Biological father
- Vaijayanti as Vaijayanti: Vedanth's grandmother, Vaidehi and Suhasini's mother
- Abhishek Das as Vikranth Vashishta: Vedanth's younger brother
- Ranjan Sanath as Dhruva Vashishta: Vedanth's younger brother
- Ashwini (March 2019-August 2021)/Gagana (August 2021 – 2023)/Aarthi (2023-2024) as Aarthi Vikranth Vashishta (née Manjunath): Amulya's elder sister
- Priya J Achar as Adithi Dhruva Vashishta (née Manjunath): Amulya's younger sister
- Anvitha Sagar as Aadya Sarthak Ashwath (née Vashishta): Vedanth's younger sister
- Girish Bettappa as Sarthak Ashwath: Vedanth's brother-in-law
- Mahati Bhat as Anjali Manjunath (Anju): Amulya's younger sister
- Ravichandra as Lakshmikanth (Kantha): Vedanth's PA
- Sony as Ahalya: Vedanth's collegemate
- Sharanya Shetty as Sahithya: Vedanth's ex-fiancée and ex-employee
- Rashmitha Changappa as Sarika Ashwath: Vedanth's ex-employee and Sarthak's younger sister, antagonist
- Laya Kokila as Paramananda: Vedanth's maternal uncle
- Rohiet Nair as Agni

== Production ==
Actor Rakksh , who had previously appeared as the lead hero in the serial Putta Gowri Maduve, was selected to portray the lead male role of Vedanth Vashishta. Actress Nisha Ravikrishnan was cast in the lead female role of Amulya, who had previously appeared in the serial Sarvamangala Mangalye as the lead hero's sister. Actress Sudha Narasimharaju was selected for the role of Parimala. Actor Vijay Raghavendra made special appearance in serial for promotion of his movie Malgudi Days. Rakksh, the lead actor of the serial, started his own production house named as Sri Sai Anjaneya Chitra in 2021 and up to climax Gattimela was produced by Rakksh/Rakshith under his production banner Sri Sai Anjaneya Company

== Adaptations ==
Language	Title	Original release	Network	Last aired	Notes
Telugu	Varudhini Parinayam వరూధినీ పరిణయం	5 August 2013	Zee Telugu	10 August 2016	Original
Tamil	Poove Poochudava பூவே பூச்சூடவா	24 April 2017	Zee Tamil	4 September 2021	Remake
Kannada	Gattimela ಗಟ್ಟಿಮೇಳ	11 March 2019	Zee Kannada	5 January 2024	Remake
Malayalam	Pookkalam Varavayi പൂക്കാലം വരവായ്	1 July 2019	Zee Keralam	26 September 2021	Remake
Odia	Sathire ସାଥିରେ	3 October 2022	Zee Sarthak	30 September 2023	Remake
Punjabi	Dildariyan ਦਿਲਦਾਰੀਆਂ	14 November 2022	Zee Punjabi	6 October 2023	Remake
Bengali	Mon Dite Chai মন দিতে চাই	2 January 2023	Zee Bangla	24 May 2024	Remake
Marathi	36 Guni Jodi ३६ गुणी जोडी	23 January 2023	Zee Marathi	24 December 2023	Remake
Marathi	Sanai Chaughade सनई चौघडे	16 March 2026	Zee Marathi	Ongoing	Remake
Hindi	Shubh Shagun Shehnaiyan शुभ शगुन शहनाइयाँ	30 November 2026	Zee TV	Ongoing	Remake

== Reception ==
At the opening week to till climax, it became the most watched Kannada television program by getting in top 2 position. Also it is widely received by the television audience. It tops the BARC ratings for the top five Kannada programs regularly. Due to COVID-19, a lockdown was imposed and shooting came into halt. In this time, when Kannada films took over the top places Gattimela was the only serial that remained in the list of top 5 Kannada programs for most of the time in spite of repeat telecast.

=== Special episodes ===
During the COVID-19 second waves, Paaru and Gattimela aired special one-hour episodes called 'Prema Sangama'.

== Awards and nominations ==
Award	Category	Recipient	Notes
Zee Kannada Kutumba Awards 2019	Popular Actor in Lead Role (Male)	Rakksh	
Zee Kannada Kutumba Awards 2019	Popular Actor in Lead Role (Female)	Nisha Ravikrishnan	
Zee Kannada Kutumba Awards 2019	Popular Jodi	Rakksh and Nisha Ravikrishnan	
Zee Kannada Kutumba Awards 2019	Best Sahodhara (Brother)	Abhishek Das	
Zee Kannada Kutumba Awards 2019	Best Sahodhari (Sister)	Ashwini, Priya J Achar and Mahati	
Zee Kannada Kutumba Awards 2019	Best Amma	Sudha Narasimharaju	
Zee Kannada Kutumba Awards 2019	Best Comedian	Ravichandra Tommy	
Zee Kannada Kutumba Awards 2019	Best Rated TRP Serial	Gattimela	
Zee Kannada Kutumba Awards 2019	Best Director	Koramangala Anil	
Zee Kannada Kutumba Awards 2019	Best Dialogue Writer	Karthik Bhat	
Zee Kannada Kutumba Awards 2020	Popular Actor in Lead Role (Male)	Rakksh	
Zee Kannada Kutumba Awards 2020	Best Actor in Lead Role (Female)	Nisha Ravikrishnan	
Zee Kannada Kutumba Awards 2020	Popular Jodi	Rakksh and Nisha Ravikrishnan	
Zee Kannada Kutumba Awards 2020	Best Sahodhara (Brother)	Abhishek Das	
Zee Kannada Kutumba Awards 2020	Best Sahodhari (Sister)	Ashwini, Priya J Achar and Mahati	
Zee Kannada Kutumba Awards 2020	Best Amma	Sudha Narasimharaju	
Zee Kannada Kutumba Awards 2020	Best Comedian	Ravichandra Tommy	
Zee Kannada Kutumba Awards 2020	Popular Serial	Gattimela	
Zee Kannada Kutumba Awards 2020	Best Director	Koramangala Anil	
Zee Kannada Kutumba Awards 2020	Best Screenplay Writer	Chethana Vasishtha	
Zee Kannada Kutumba Awards 2021	Favorite Actor in Lead Role (Male)	Rakksh	
Zee Kannada Kutumba Awards 2021	Favorite Actor in Lead Role (Female)	Nisha Ravikrishnan	
Zee Kannada Kutumba Awards 2021	Popular Jodi	Rakksh and Nisha Ravikrishnan	
Zee Kannada Kutumba Awards 2021	Best Athe	Sudha Narasimharaju	
Zee Kannada Kutumba Awards 2021	Best Sahodhara (Brother)	Abhishek Das	
Zee Kannada Kutumba Awards 2021	Best Sahodhari (Sister)	Anvitha Sagar	
Zee Kannada Kutumba Awards 2022	Popular Actor in Lead Role (Male)	Rakksh	
Zee Kannada Kutumba Awards 2022	Popular Actor in Lead Role (Female)	Nisha Ravikrishnan	
Zee Kannada Kutumba Awards 2022	Popular Jodi	Rakksh and Nisha Ravikrishnan	
Zee Kannada Kutumba Awards 2022	Best Sahodhara (Brother)	Abhishek Das	
Zee Kannada Kutumba Awards 2022	Popular Serial	Gattimela	
Zee Kannada Kutumba Awards 2022	Best Athe	Sudha Narasimharaju	
Zee Kannada Kutumba Awards 2022	Best Villain Female	Archana	
Zee Kannada Kutumba Awards 2022	Best Appa	Ravi Kalabrahma	
Zee Kannada Kutumba Awards 2022	Best Production manager	Naveen	
Zee Kannada Kutumba Awards 2022	Best Screenplay Writer	Kavya, Srujan Raghavendra	
Zee Kannada Kutumba Awards 2023	Popular Jodi	Rakksh and Nisha Ravikrishnan	
Zee Kannada Kutumba Awards 2023	Best Amma	Swathi	
