= 36 Guni Jodi =

2023 Indian Marathi language TV series

- Genre: Drama
- Directed by: Abhijeet Patil
- Starring: See below
- Country of origin: India
- Original language: Marathi
- No. of episodes: 294

Production
- Producer: Shashank Solanki
- Production locations: Mumbai, Maharashtra, India
- Camera setup: Multi-camera
- Running time: 22 minutes
- Production company: Seventh Sense Media

Original release
- Network: Zee Marathi
- Release: 23 January – 24 December 2023

Related
- Sanai Chaughade

36 Guni Jodi (transl. 36 Qualities Pair) is an Indian Marathi language drama series that aired on Zee Marathi. It starred Aayush Salunkhe and Anushka Sarkate in lead roles. It is produced by Shashank Solanki and directed by Abhijeet Patil under the banner of Seventh Sense Media. It premiered from 23 January 2023 by replacing Majhi Tujhi Reshimgath. It is an official remake of Telugu TV series Varudhini Parinayam.

== Plot ==
Vedant and Amulya are as different as chalk and cheese and always at loggerheads.

=== Special episode (1 hour) ===
- 5 March 2023
- 23 April 2023
- 14 May 2023
- 16 July 2023
- 3 September 2023
- 12 November 2023
- 24 December 2023

== Cast ==
=== Main ===
- Aayush Sanjeev as Vedant Shridhar Wankhede
- Anushka Sarkate as Amulya Ashish Tumpalwar

=== Recurring ===
Wankhede family

- Abhijeet Chavan as Shridhar Wankhede - Vedant's father
- Pradnya Jawale as Nutan Shridhar Wankhede - Vedant's mother
- Tejas Dongre / Swanand Ketkar as Vikrant Shridhar Wankhede - Vedant's brother, Aarti's husband
- Akshata Apte as Aadya Shridhar Wankhede / Aadya Sarthak Badwaik - Vedant's sister, Sarthak's wife
- Sanyogita Bhave as Aaji - Nutan's mother

Tumpalwar family

- Rujuta Deshmukh as Suman Ashish Tumpalwar - Amulya's mother
- Avinash Narkar as Ashish (Anna) Tumpalwar - Amulya's father
- Sanjana Kale as Aarti Ashish Tumpalwar / Aarti Vikrant Wankhede - Amulya's sister, Vikrant's wife

Badwaik family

- Surabhi Bhave-Damle as Sumati Rajsingh Badwaik - Suman's sister, Sarthak's mother
- Sagar Korade as Sarthak Rajsingh Badwaik - Amulya's cousin, Aadya's husband
- Vidisha Mhaskar as Sarika Rajsingh Badwaik - Sarthak's sister
- Milind Adhikari as Rajsingh Badwaik - Sarthak's father

Others

- Milind Shinde as Purushottam Gudpallivar - Nutan's right hand
- Rohit Raut as Amartya - Vedant's friend
- Ruchira Jadhav as Sahitya Gaikwad - Vedant's fiance
- Milind Shirole as Vijay Pawar - Vedant's P.A.
- Sanjit Pednekar as Shripad - Office worker
- Rucha Modak as Meena - Clinic receptionist
- Ruturaj Phadke as Gautam Prabhakar Ghorpade - Aarti's fiance
- Pooja Gore as Pallavi Gautam Ghorpade - Gautam's wife
- Shubhada Naik as Prabha Prabhakar Ghorpade - Gautam's mother

== Adaptations ==
Language	Title	Original release	Network	Last aired	Notes
Telugu	Varudhini Parinayam వరూధినీ పరిణయం	5 August 2013	Zee Telugu	10 August 2016	Original
Tamil	Poove Poochudava பூவே பூச்சூடவா	24 April 2017	Zee Tamil	4 September 2021	Remake
Kannada	Gattimela ಗಟ್ಟಿಮೇಳ	11 March 2019	Zee Kannada	5 January 2024	Remake
Malayalam	Pookkalam Varavayi പൂക്കാലം വരവായ്	1 July 2019	Zee Keralam	26 September 2021	Remake
Odia	Sathire ସାଥିରେ	3 October 2022	Zee Sarthak	30 September 2023	Remake
Punjabi	Dildariyan ਦਿਲਦਾਰੀਆਂ	14 November 2022	Zee Punjabi	6 October 2023	Remake
Bengali	Mon Dite Chai মন দিতে চাই	2 January 2023	Zee Bangla	24 May 2024	Remake
Marathi	36 Guni Jodi ३६ गुणी जोडी	23 January 2023	Zee Marathi	24 December 2023	Remake
Marathi	Sanai Chaughade सनई चौघडे	16 March 2026	Zee Marathi	Ongoing	Remake
Hindi	Shubh Shagun Shehnaiyan शुभ शगुन शहनाइयाँ	30 November 2026	Zee TV	Ongoing	Remake
