= Rakksh =

Indian actor

- Born: Rakshith G 8 January 1994 (age 32); Magadi, Ramanagara
- Education: BA.LLB, Masters in IPR
- Occupations: Actor, Producer
- Years active: 2012–present
- Spouse: Anusha Shivaprasad(m.26 May 2019)

Rakksh also known as Rakksh Raam, is an actor from South India, working mainly in Kannada Film Industry. He began his career in 2012 as an assistant director, contributing to few Kannada films. Later on, Rakksh made his television debut as a lead in soap opera Putta Gowri Maduve. Rakksh is best known for his breakthrough performance as Vedanth Vasishta in Gattimela. In 2021, He also turned as producer for Gattimela under his banner Sri Sai Anjaneya Company. Rakksh signs pan-india film titled Burma.

== Filmography ==
=== Television ===
Year	Program	Role	Language	Channel	Notes
2014-2018	Putta Gowri Maduve	Mahesh Chandra/Mahi	Kannada	Colors Kannada	
2019–2024	Gattimela	Vedanth	Kannada	Zee Kannada	Also producer

=== Films ===
†	Denotes films that have not yet been released

Year	Film	Role	Notes	Ref.
2020	Naragunda Bandaya	Veerappa Basappa Kadlikoppa	Debut film	
2026	Burma †	TBA	Also producer	

== Production ==
The Production house is named SriSaiAnjaneyaCompany/ Rakksh Studios located in Bengaluru.

- SriSaiAnjaneyaCompany on Instagram

=== Television ===
Year	Program	Language	Channel	Notes
2021-2024	Gattimela	Kannada	Zee Kannada	
2024-2025	Drishtibottu	Kannada	Colors Kannada	
2025–2026	Jodihakki	Kannada	Zee Power	

=== Films ===
Year	Film	Language	Notes
	Burma	Pan India	

== Awards ==
Rakksh Raam has won numerous awards as the Popular hero and highest rated shows across south India. Rakksh also received achievers under 30 from Minister of Industries Murugesh Nirani

Year	Nominated work	Category	Award	Result	Notes	Ref.
2016	Putta Gowri Maduve	Mane Mecchida Maga	Anubhanda Awards	Won	Received from Vijay Raghavendra	
2017	Putta Gowri Maduve	Mane Mecchida Maga	Anubhanda Awards	Won	Received from Vijay Raghavendra	
2019	Gattimela	Popular Actor in Lead Role(Male)	Zee Kutumba Awards	Won	Received from Srimurali	
2019	Gattimela	Favorite Jodi (with Nisha Ravikrishnan)	Zee Kutumba Awards	Won	Received from Sathish Ninasam	
2020	Gattimela	Favorite Actor in Lead Role(Male)	Zee Kutumba Awards	Won	Received from Mukhyamantri Chandru	
2020	Gattimela	Popular Jodi (with Nisha Ravikrishnan)	Zee Kutumba Awards	Won	Received from Ramji, Aroor jagadish	
2021	Gattimela	Favorite Actor in Lead Role(Male)	Zee Kutumba Awards	Won	Received from Ramesh Aravind, Rachita Ram	
2021	Gattimela	Popular Jodi (with Nisha Ravikrishnan)	Zee Kutumba Awards	Won	Received from Shiva Rajkumar	
2022	Gattimela	Favorite Actor in Lead Role(Male)	Zee Kutumba Awards	Won	Received from Gurukiran	
2022	Gattimela	Popular Jodi (with Nisha Ravikrishnan)	Zee Kutumba Awards	Won	Received from Darling Krishna, Milana Nagaraj	
2023	Gattimela	Popular Jodi (with Nisha Ravikrishnan)	Zee Kutumba Awards	Won	Received from Prem, Rakshita Prem	
