= Ronson Vincent =

Indian actor

- Born: 8 August 1983 (age 42); Calicut, India
- Other name: George Vincent
- Occupations: Actor; model
- Years active: 2010 – present
- Known for: Nandan in Bharya
- Spouse: Neeraja Baiju

Ronson Vincent, also known as George Vincent, is an Indian film and television actor.

== Early life ==
Ronson's family hails from Calicut India.

== Career ==
Ronson Vincent started his career as a model for popular brands. He made his silver screen debut with the Telugu film Manasara... directed by Ravi Babu. He portrayed the character of an IT professional, a man with shades of grey. Vincent received the Bharata Muni award for the best villain for the film. Vincent landed in Malayalam with Study Tour Batch 162 helmed by Thomas Benjamin.

He entered the television with the soap opera Bharya aired on Asianet. He played Nandan, son of Prof. Vishwanatha Menon and Jayapradha teacher. Bharya tells the tale of family residing in Vrindavanam.

== Filmography ==
=== Television ===
- All programs are in Malayalam language and serials, unless otherwise noted.

| Year | Title | Channel | Role | Notes |
|---|---|---|---|---|
| 2007-2008 | Minnukettu | Surya TV | Meera's lover | Debut |
| 2010 | Vigraham | Asianet | John | |
| 2016-2019 | Bharya | Asianet | Nandan | Breakthrough role |
| 2017 | 9th Asianet television awards | Asianet | Co-host | Award night |
| 2017 | Star War | Surya TV | Participant | Reality show |
| 2018 | Urvashi Theaters | Asianet | Participant | Reality show |
| 2019 | Seetha | Flowers TV | Jatayu Dharman | |
| 2019 | Arayannagalude Veedu | Flowers TV | Jatayu Dharman | |
| 2019-2020 | Bangaru Panjaram | Star Maa | Rajashekar Varma (Raja Babu) | Telugu debut |
| 2020 | Anuragam | Mazhavil Manorama | Aravindan | |
| 2020 | Koodathayi | Flowers TV | Tony | |
| 2020 | Comedy Stars Season 2 | Asianet | Rameshan | Comedy show |
| 2021 | Rakkuyil | Mazhavil Manorama | Roy Alex Palathingal | |
| 2022 | Bigg Boss (Malayalam season 4) | Asianet | Contestant | Reality show |
| 2024-2025 | Malikappuram: Apathbandhavan Ayyappan | Asianet | Narasimham / Govindan | |

=== Films ===
| Year | Film | Role | Language | Ref |
|---|---|---|---|---|
| 2008 | Chempada | | Malayalam | |
| 2010 | Manasara... | Rajan | Telugu | |
| 2012 | Study tour batch 162 | IT professional | Malayalam | |
| 2013 | Mallela Theeram Lo Sirimalle Puvvu | Lakshmi's husband | Telugu | |
| 2013 | Mr. Pellikoduku | | Telugu | |
| 2020 | Nun | | Malayalam | |
| 2023 | Ramabanam | Mukherjee's son | Telugu | |
| 2025 | Akhanda 2: Thaandavam | Ajay Thakur | Telugu | |
| 2026 | The RajaSaab | Goon | Telugu | |

== Awards and nominations ==
| Year | Award | Category | Serial | Result |
|---|---|---|---|---|
| 2017 | Modern film city Masika television awards 2016 | Best Debut Male | Bharya | Won |
| 2017 | 10th Asianet television awards | Best New Face (Male) | Bharya | Nominated |
| 2017 | 10th Asianet television awards | Best Star Pair | Bharya | Nominated |
| 2017 | 10th Asianet television awards | Most popular Actor | Bharya | Nominated |
| 2017 | 10th Asianet television awards | Youth Icon | Bharya | Won |
