= Poove Poochudava (TV series) =

2017 Indian Tamil-language TV series

- Genre: Soap opera
- Written by: Dialogues; Mithra
- Screenplay by: Sargunam Pungaraj
- Directed by: G. Manikanda Kumar (episodes 1-710); Rathinam Vasudevan (episodes 711-1149)
- Creative director: A. Abdullah
- Starring: Reshma Muralidharan; Karthick Vasu
- Theme music composer: Kiran
- Opening theme: "Ethir Ethire" sung by Rita
- Composers: Vishal Chandrasekar (Title song)
- Country of origin: India
- Original language: Tamil
- No. of episodes: 1149

Production
- Executive producers: M.Saravanan; C.Murugan
- Producers: Shruthi Narayanan; Ayisha Abdulla
- Cinematography: Keshavan
- Editor: S. Arul
- Camera setup: Multi-camera
- Running time: 22 minutes
- Production company: Team Work Manthra

Original release
- Network: Zee Tamil
- Release: 24 April 2017 – 4 September 2021

Related
- Varudhini Parinayam

Poove Poochudava (transl. Come to adorn you with flowers) is a 2017 Indian Tamil language soap opera starring Reshma Muralidharan and Karthick Vasu. It premiered on 24 April 2017 on Zee Tamil. The show is an official remake of Telugu TV series Varudhini Parinayam. This series directed by Rathinam Vasudevan and developed by Team Work Manthra. It is the third longest serial on Zee Tamil after Sembaruthi and Yaaradi Nee Mohini.

== Plot ==
Shiva and Shakthi meet in an automobile accident and instantly hate each other, but conspire to help Shiva's cousin Sundhar who has fallen in love with Shakthi's sister Meenakshi. Following a series of misunderstandings, Meenakshi's marriage to Gautham is called off and the new match Sundhar was proposed. Meenakshi's parents agree but Sundhar's mother Subadhra insists that Shiva marry first as the eldest son. As Subadhra had killed Shiva's parents to get his property. Though Shiva is a woman hater with no interest in marriage, he says he will marry his employee, Nithya.

Shakthi learns that Subadhra has ill intentions and she threatens to have Meenakshi killed if Shakthi doesn't stop the marriage. Shakthi is suspicious when Nithya disappears, but it turns out that Shiva was never serious about the wedding and paid Nithya to pretend. Shiva's relatives that he marry Shakthi. Shiva thinks Sundhar's life and he accepts to marry Shakthi However, Shakthi also accepts it, and they are married, also Meenakshi and Sundhar married.

Both couples move into the law's family, though Shiva and Shakthi continue to quarrel. Subadhra consults an astrologer and is convinced that there is a threat to Sundhar's life, which is why she tried to interfere with their marriage. Told of this, Meenakshi makes excuses to postpone the consummation of their marriage to save Sundhar, and the couple faces ongoing interference from his relatives. Shakthi later learns that the astrologer is a charlatan.

Aishwarya, Shakthi's cousin moves into the home in a scheme of Subadhra's, and she tries to come between Sundhar and Meenakshi. She also helps to frame Shakthi for the theft of family heirlooms, and then for mental illness. Shiva becomes sympathetic and seems to grow closer to Shakthi. However, he gives her divorce papers on his birthday. Shakthi requests one year to make him fall in love with her, which he accepts.

Shiva's sister Dharani moves into the house and becomes an ally to Shakthi. In a complicated plot they put pressure on Subadhra, and Meenakshi overhears Subadhra and Aishwarya discussing their schemes. Meenakshi confronts them for their underhanded behaviour. Finally Aishwariya leaves the home.

Shakthi's old college friend Ganga begins working for Shiva's business. They conspire to make Shiva jealous by faking calls to Shakthi from a man named Ranjith. Ganga eventually impersonates Ranjith and visits the home, but Shiva gives Ranjith his blessing to marry Shakthi. Ranjith instead challenges Shiva to three tasks to test whether he loves Shakthi. Shiva, however, fails in all three tests and confesses his love for Shakthi.

Subadhra and her comic mother Nagalakshmi hatch many plans to separate Shiva and Shakthi. But Shakthi wins every time and gets much closer to Shiva. When Anu, Shakthi's sister learns about Shakti's divorce through her friend Venkat who is also Shakthi Shiva's divorce lawyer and love interest of Anu, they both plan to make Shiva and Shakthi close. As a part of their plan, they arrange for an outing for the couple, but Subadhra postpones it. A turn of events, it is also revealed that Sundar and Venkat were college buddies. Meanwhile, Shakthi's family move into Shiva's house as their house has been conquered by their owner's son which is a plan of Subadhra to make them stay here and humiliate them which will result in Shakthi leaving the house.

As Shiva and Shakthi's marriage happened in a rush, Shiva and Shakthi's family plans another wedding for them. Subadhra kidnaps Anu and Venkat on the eve of the wedding to frame them of eloping. But Shiva found out about their kidnap and rushed to rescue them, but the goons also kidnap him. Shakthi finds this on the day of marriage and rescues Shiva, Anu, Venkat with the help of Ranveer and a policeman.

Meanwhile, Shakthi's father learns of Subadhra and her mother's schemes and threatens to reveal the truth. Subadhra kills him, which is witnessed by Durga, but her aide prevents Durga from shouting for help. Everybody asks for Shakthi, Shiva, Anu and there comes a letter stating that Anu has eloped with Venkat (letter written by Subadhra) and Subadhra makes Shakthi's father's death as a suicide owing to the elopement of his third daughter which makes everyone believe including Shakthi. Durga later manages to flee from the clutches of Subadhra's hired goon but is knocked down to temporary paralysis.

Later on, Without knowing him, Shiva falls in love with Shakthi and decides to confess his love to Shakthi, but he meets with an accident. Later on, he is admitted to the hospital where the doctor declares that Shiva has lost his memories. On hearing this fact, Shakthi is disappointed, on the other hand, Subhadra and Patti are happy as Shiva would forget about Shakthi. Ranveer, Sundhar, Dharani, Anu and Meenakshi plan to reunite Shiva and Shakthi; they try various things such as reminding Shiva of Shakthi's name, but Subadhra sets multiple obstacles.

At present, a new character Sangeetha is hired by Subadhra to act as Shakthi so that Shiva would forget the real Shakthi. On the other hand, Shiva accepts Sangeetha as Shakthi and he gets her into the house. As Shakthi's family shocked and they decided to hatch the plans to get out her. Now Shakthi leaves the home and she comes as Meera and works in Shiva's office. Days passed on Shakthi meets a new friend Deepa and she stayed in her house. As Subadhra fixed a marriage for Sangeetha and Shiva also with Anu and Venkat on same day. Shakthi feels a lot for Shiva's marriage and she brings Shiva to the Ashramam to get back his past memories. But due to Subadhra's plan, he not cured completely and Shakthi worries. On the day of Marriage function, Deepa knows the truth of Subadhra and she got an evidence that she killed Shakthi's father. As Subadhra tells a thief to kill Deepa, she runs through the marriage hall. On the time of marriage to be end, Shakthi leaves the hall and she decides to go somewhere and live. That time suddenly a light lamp falls on Shiva's head. When he regains consciousness, he recovers his memories. Meanwhile, Shakthi waits for the bus, Deepa saw Shakthi and approaches her. A car hits Deepa, so Shakthi admits her in hospital with the name of her-Shakthi. But Deepa dies. Before she dies, she gave an evidence of Subadhra to Shakthi. As Shiva asked real Shakthi, Sundhar told all the plan of Subdhra and Shiva called police and they arrested Subadhra, Sangeetha and Nagalakshmi. As everyone searched Shakthi, Sundhar attend the call from hospital that one girl named Shakthi has died. Everyone went to the hospital and they all misunderstood that the died girl Deepa was Shakthi. Shiva often worries. Shakthi decides to move to Delhi with a her friend name as Deepa and she joins an company and she stayed there. After Shakthi learns she was pregnant. Finally Shakthi gave birth to a baby boy and Meenakshi gave birth to a baby girl. Shakthi is taken care by her friend Mahendra Singh.

=== After eight years ===
Shiva and Shakthi's and Meenakshi and Sundar's respective children have grown up as Pugazh and Mithra. Pugazh hates his father and he didn't even know his father's name. One day Pugazh gone missing and Shiva rescue him. Without knowing that about their relationship Pugazh and Shiva loves each other and Pugazh call Shiva milkyman and Shiva call him milkyboy. They start to meet often and Shakthi felt happy with this. Aditya Yogi Shakthi's boss fall in love with Shakthi but as he learn about her relationship with Shiva he started to hatch plan to marry Shakthi. He did multiple crimes to make Shiva and Shakthi to didn't meet. As Aditya Yogi propose a marriage with Shakthi she frequently agrees with one-sided heart. Shiva also learn that she Shakthi is alive and they got a son which is Pugazh also got to know about Aditya Yogi plan to marry Shakthi so Shiva and Mahendra Singh rushed to the marriage hall. Shakthi also learn that Shiva is not married to Sangeeta that day and has remembered his memories in a YouTube video that Shiva has posted. While Pugazh learn that Shiva is his father he try to stop the wedding but kidnapped by Aditya Yogi and his friend. When Shakthi asked Aditya Yogi to stop the marriage but He blackmail and force her by telling that he kidnapped Pugazh. As reached the marriage hall Shiva and Mahendra Singh rescue Pugazh. Shiva also stopped the wedding and proposes to Shakthi. Aditya Yogi learn his mistake and get them married. Shakthi and Pugazh back to Shiva's home and Subadhra and her mother apologize to her. The rest of the story is about how Shiva and Shakthi going to keep their relationship happy from all the other struggles.

== Cast ==
=== Main ===
- Reshma Muralidharan as Shakthi Shiva: A hard-working woman from a lower-middle-class family and Shiva's wife also Pugazh's foster mother. She has also portrayed characters such as Anushka Roy, Meera and Deepa. (2017–2021)
- Karthick Vasu (2019–2021) as Shiva: a man from a rich family who has recently returned from studies abroad to run a business, he hates women but he married Shakthi and Pugazh's foster father
  - Dinesh Gopalsamy as Shiva (2017–2019 and replaced by Karthick Vasudevan)

=== Recurring ===
- Eshwar Raghunathan as Mahendra Singh "Mahi": An employee in Delhi, also Shakthi's best friend and husband of Janaki (2020–2021)
- Sri Varshan Chinraj as Pugazhlendi "Pugazh" (2020–2021): Shakthi and Shiva's foster son. He is very adamant type also he hates his father but he loves Shiva.
- Monisha Arshak (2021) as Janaki Mahendra Singh: Shiva's biological sister and wife of Mahi
- Yuvarani Meena Kumari (2018–2021) as Subadhra: Sundar and Dharini's mother, Shiva and Janaki's paternal aunt
  - Yuvarani as Subadhra (2017–2018 and replaced by Meena)
- Uma Padmanabhan as Godhavari: Shakthi, Meenakshi, Anu and Durga's mother (2017–2021)
- Krithika Laddu as Meenakshi Sundar (2017–2021): Shakthi's elder sister and Sundhar's wife
- Hema as Mithra (2020–2021): Sundar and Meenakshi's daughter
- Kousalya Senthamarai as DIG Nagalakshmi "Paati": Subhadra's mother, Sundar and Dharini's grandmother (2017–2021)
- Diwakar as Ranveer / Surat Koli: Shiva's secretary also Shakthi's helper (2017–2021)
- Dhanalakshmi as Anu Venkat: Sakthi's sister (2017–2021)
- Santhosh as Venkat: Anu's husband (2018–2021)

=== Others ===
- Madhan Pandian as Sundhar: Shiva's cousin, Meenakshi's husband and Subhadra's son (2017–2021)
- Karan Sagar as Sahil (2021): Pughal's biological father and Shushma's husband
- Revathy as Shushma (2021): Pughal's biological mother and Sahil's wife
- Ishwarya as Aishwariya: Shakthi, Meenakshi, Anu's cousin sister (2021)
  - Shamily Sukumar (2017–2020) as Aishwarya (replaced by Ishwarya)
- Chandhini Prakash as Shakthi / Sangeetha: A fake Shakthi who was sent by Subhadra. But later it fails. Now she joined her hands with Mrinalini to revenge Sakthi (2019–2021)
- Vimal Venkatesan as Aadhitya Yogi: who loves Shakthi and manager in Delhi (2020–2021)
- Geetha Ravishankar as Aadhitya Yogi's mother (2020-2021)
- Meena Vemuri as Radhi: Aadhitya Yogi's relation (2020-2021)
- Chaitra Reddy as Mrinalini / Agniputhri : A criminal lady who sent by Yogi to separate Shiva and Sakthi and to attract Shiva (2020)
- Priya as Sujatha: Shakti's aunt and Godhavari's sister (2017–2018 & 2020)
- Nithyalakshmi as Ganga / Ranjith: Shakthi's college friend (2017–2019)
- Kiruthika (2018–2019) as Dharani Karthik: Sundhar's younger sister and Subhadra's daughter
  - Sridevi Ashok as Dharani (2017–2018 and replaced by Kiruthika)
- Raveena Daha as Durga: Shakthi's sister (2017–2019)
- L. Raja as Swaminathan: Shakthi, Meenakshi, Anu and Durga's father (killed by Subhadra) (2017–2019)
- Ashwanth Thilak as Karthik: Dharani's husband (2017–2018)
- Sai Priyanka Ruth as Nithya: Shiva's employee and fake fiancée (2017–2018)
- Bavithran as Gautham: Meenakshi's ex-fiancée (2017–2018)
- Ayyappan as Ashok: Sangeetha's estranged husband (2019)
- Hensha Deepan as Deepa: Shakthi's friend (died in serial) (2019–2020)

=== Cameos ===
- Shreekumar as Inspector Sree: who appeared in Shiva and Shakthi's marriage (2017)
- Sanjay Kumar Asrani as a Doctor (2018)
- Bonda Mani as a thief (2020)
- Singamuthu as a thief (2020)
- Livingston as Poiyamozhi: The home minister (2020)
- Deepa Sree as Shakunthala: home minister Poiyamozhi's wife (2020)
- Thidiyan as Idai Azhagan: Poiyamozhi and Shakunthala's son (2020)

== Production ==
=== Casting ===
Dancer Reshma was cast in the lead female role, though it is her first serial. She was previously best known as a Dance Jodi Dance contestant. Dinesh Gopalsamy, who had previously appeared in Vijay TV series Pirivom Santhippom and Mahan, was selected to portray the lead male role of Shiva. Actress Uma Padmanabhan was selected to the role of Gothavari. Actress Krithika Laddu was cast to play the role of Meenakshi, and Madhan Pandian for the role of Sundhar. From the Episode 612, Karthick Vasu of Priyamanaval and Kalyanam Mudhal Kadhal Varai fame was roped in as the male lead replacing Dinesh.

=== Reception ===
- On 22 March 2017, the first promo of the show's title song was released by Zee Tamil on Facebook, YouTube and Zee Official Website Page.
- This series' together with Yaaradi Nee Mohini series' first official photo was released on 4 February 2017 during the final episode of Dance Jodi Dance. The second cast interview was on Puthandu (Tamil New Year) on 14 April 2017 in the Chithirai Puthandu special programs hosted by Deepak Dinkar and Archana Chandhoke.
- Due to COVID-19 Pandemic situation Poove Poochoodava and all other Zee Tamil serials have stopped from 28 March. On 27 July all Zee Tamil Serials resumed with fresh episodes.

=== Ratings ===
In March 2021, the marriage track of Poove Poochudava between Shakthi and Aadhitya Yogi, Shakthi found that Shiva was not married with Sangeetha and he got conscious. Then Shiva also found Shakthi was in Delhi with the help of Mahi. Then Shiva stopped the marriage of Shakthi with Yogi. Finally they both reunited after 8 years. These theme episodes preview of ZEE5 was trending on YouTube and one of those was in #1 on Trending for two days with 22 million views.

=== Title song ===
The title song written by lyricist Daa. Ko, composed by Vishal Chandrasekhar and sung by Rita.

Track list
No.	Title	Lyrics	Music	Singer(s)	Length
1.	"Ethir Ethire" (title song)	Daa. Ko	Vishal Chandrasekhar	Rita	2:00

== Awards ==
Award	Category	Recipient
Zee Tamil Kudumbam Viruthugal 2018	Best serial	Poove Poochudava
Zee Tamil Kudumbam Viruthugal 2018	Favourite pair	Dinesh & Reshma Reya
Zee Tamil Kudumbam Viruthugal 2018	Best comedian	Kousalya
Zee Tamil Kudumbam Viruthugal 2018	Best supporting actor male	Madhan
Zee Tamil Kudumbam Viruthugal 2018	Best supporting actor female	Krithika
Zee Tamil Kudumbam Viruthugal 2018	Best actress	Reshma Reya

Additionally Poove Poochudava won and recognized by Tamil Nadu State Government Awards also includes,Reshma Muralidharan wons Best Actress(2019), Yuvarani wons Best Female Negative character(2017),Best Serial (2018),Rathinam Vasudevan-Best Director(2020),Sargunam Pungaraj-Best Screenplay Writer(2020),Best Dubbing artist Female- Sridevi(2020)

== Adaptations ==
Language	Title	Original release	Network	Last aired	Notes
Telugu	Varudhini Parinayam వరూధినీ పరిణయం	5 August 2013	Zee Telugu	10 August 2016	Original
Tamil	Poove Poochudava பூவே பூச்சூடவா	24 April 2017	Zee Tamil	4 September 2021	Remake
Kannada	Gattimela ಗಟ್ಟಿಮೇಳ	11 March 2019	Zee Kannada	5 January 2024	Remake
Malayalam	Pookkalam Varavayi പൂക്കാലം വരവായ്	1 July 2019	Zee Keralam	26 September 2021	Remake
Odia	Sathire ସାଥିରେ	3 October 2022	Zee Sarthak	30 September 2023	Remake
Punjabi	Dildariyan ਦਿਲਦਾਰੀਆਂ	14 November 2022	Zee Punjabi	6 October 2023	Remake
Bengali	Mon Dite Chai মন দিতে চাই	2 January 2023	Zee Bangla	24 May 2024	Remake
Marathi	36 Guni Jodi ३६ गुणी जोडी	23 January 2023	Zee Marathi	24 December 2023	Remake
Marathi	Sanai Chaughade सनई चौघडे	16 March 2026	Zee Marathi	Ongoing	Remake
Hindi	Shubh Shagun Shehnaiyan शुभ शगुन शहनाइयाँ	30 November 2026	Zee TV	Ongoing	Remake
