= Arun G Raghavan =

Indian actor (born 20th century)

Arun G Raghavan (born 20th century), also known by the stage name Arun Raghav, is an Indian actor, known for his work in Malayalam-language television.

His work includes appearances in Soubhagyavathi, Bharya and Pookkalam Varavayi. His breakthrough performance was playing ten roles, including a female role, in the Bharya serial.

== Early life, education, and early career ==
Born to Raghavan and Sridevi, Arun finished his high schooling at St. Joseph School, Anandapuram and undergraduate studies at St. Thomas College, Thrissur. After completing his studies, he started working as a system engineer before taking acting as a profession.

== Acting career ==
Raghavan began his cinema career with the film Vilakkumaram (2017) which was directed by Vijay Menon. He was a part of the Malayalam short film Blade. Later, he acted in serials, including Soubhagyavathi, Bharya, Sthreepadham and Pookkalam Varavayi.

=== Television ===
Year	Title	Role	Channel	Notes
2014-2015	Soubhagyavathi	Mahesh	Surya TV	Debut
2016	Anamika		Amrita TV	
2016	Kana Kanmani	Giri	Asianet	
2017-2020	Sthreepadham	Sooraj	Mazhavil Manorama	
2017-2019	Bharya	Vidura Sura/Suresh/Surya/Sharath /Shahjahan/Shankar Das/Krishnaprasad/ Arjun /Shakthi/Yamini	Asianet	Played 10 roles
2019-2021	Pookkalam Varavayi	Abhimanyu	Zee Keralam	
2020	Chembarathi	Abhimanyu	Zee Keralam	Guest appearance
2021	Mrs. Hitler	Abhimanyu	Zee Keralam	Guest appearance
2022-2023	Mrs. Hitler	Dev Krishna [DK]	Zee Keralam	Replaced Shanavas Shanu
2021-2022	Pranayavarnangal	DK	Zee Keralam	Cameo appearance
2022	Ente Maathavu	Roshan	Surya TV	Cameo appearance
2023	Manjil Virinja Poovu	Sudev	Mazhavil Manorama	
2023	Mangalyam	DK	Zee Keralam	Cameo appearance
2023- 2024	Mayamayuram	Maheshwaran	Zee Keralam	
2024	Constable Manju	Swamy Ayyappan	Surya TV	
2025	Malikappuram: Apathbandhavan Ayyappan	Parashuraman	Asianet	
2025-present	Mahalakshmi	Kannan	Flowers TV	
2025	Meenu's Kitchen	Suraj	Mazhavil Manorama	
2025-present	Othiri Othiri Swapnangal	Sreenath	Mazhavil Manorama	

- List of Indian television actors
- List of people from Andhra Pradesh
- List of people from Kerala
