= Dildariyan =

2022 Indian Punjabi language TV series

- Genre: Romance; Drama
- Starring: See below
- Country of origin: India
- Original language: Punjabi
- No. of episodes: 235

Production
- Camera setup: Multi-camera
- Running time: 22 minutes

Original release
- Network: Zee Punjabi
- Release: 14 November 2022 – 6 October 2023

Related
- Varudhini Parinayam

Dildariyan is an Indian Punjabi language TV series which aired on Zee Punjabi. It starred Navdeesh Arora and Priya Arora in lead roles. It is an official remake of Telugu TV series Varudhini Parinayam. It premiered from 14 November 2022 and ended on 6 October 2023 completing 235 episodes.

== Plot ==
Ambar and Avni are always at loggerheads with each other right from their first meeting. The two contrasting personalities end up falling in love.

== Cast ==
- Navdeesh Arora as Ambar
- Priya Arora as Avani
- Hanish Rajput as Gautam
- Arjun Verma as Dhruv
- Pam Dhiman as Maya Kapoor
- Pardeep Singh Toor as Angad

== Adaptations ==
Language	Title	Original release	Network	Last aired	Notes
Telugu	Varudhini Parinayam వరూధినీ పరిణయం	5 August 2013	Zee Telugu	10 August 2016	Original
Tamil	Poove Poochudava பூவே பூச்சூடவா	24 April 2017	Zee Tamil	4 September 2021	Remake
Kannada	Gattimela ಗಟ್ಟಿಮೇಳ	11 March 2019	Zee Kannada	5 January 2024	Remake
Malayalam	Pookkalam Varavayi പൂക്കാലം വരവായ്	1 July 2019	Zee Keralam	26 September 2021	Remake
Odia	Sathire ସାଥିରେ	3 October 2022	Zee Sarthak	30 September 2023	Remake
Punjabi	Dildariyan ਦਿਲਦਾਰੀਆਂ	14 November 2022	Zee Punjabi	6 October 2023	Remake
Bengali	Mon Dite Chai মন দিতে চাই	2 January 2023	Zee Bangla	24 May 2024	Remake
Marathi	36 Guni Jodi ३६ गुणी जोडी	23 January 2023	Zee Marathi	24 December 2023	Remake
Marathi	Sanai Chaughade सनई चौघडे	16 March 2026	Zee Marathi	Ongoing	Remake
Hindi	Shubh Shagun Shehnaiyan शुभ शगुन शहनाइयाँ	30 November 2026	Zee TV	Ongoing	Remake
