= Sudha Narasimharaju =

Indian film actress

- Born: Karnataka, India
- Occupations: Film and television actress
- Father: Narasimharaju

Sudha Narasimharaju is an Indian actress in the Kannada film industry. Some of the notable films of Sudha Narasimharaju as an actress include Rathasapthami (1986), Aruna Raaga (1986), and Shubha Milana (1987).

== Career ==
Sudha Narasimharaju has been part of more than 25 Kannada feature films.

== Selected filmography ==
- Aruna Raaga (1986) her debut film
- Shanthi Nivasa (1988)
- Samyuktha (1988)
- Hrudaya Bandhana (1993)
- Bahaddur Hennu (1993)
- Nyayakkagi Saval (1994)
- Rajakeeya (1993)
- Kalyanothsava (1995)

== Television ==
- Gattimela(2019)

== See also ==
- List of people from Karnataka
- Cinema of Karnataka
- List of Indian film actresses
- Cinema of India
