= Sanai Chaughade =

2026 Indian Marathi language TV series

- Genre: Drama
- Based on: Varudhini Parinayam
- Written by: Mugdha Godbole
- Directed by: Raju Sawant
- Starring: Raj Hanchnale; Chinmayee Salvi
- Country of origin: India
- Original language: Marathi
- No. of episodes: 240

Production
- Producer: Sushama Sawant
- Production locations: Mumbai, Maharashtra
- Camera setup: Multi-camera
- Running time: 22 minutes
- Production company: One Day Creations

Original release
- Network: Zee Marathi
- Release: 16 March 2026 – present

Related
- 36 Guni Jodi

Sanai Chaughade (transl. Wedding Bells) is an Indian Marathi language TV series which premiered from 16 March 2026 airing on Zee Marathi. It features Raj Hanchnale and Chinmayee Salvi in lead roles. The show is produced by Raju Sawant under the banner of One Day Creations. The series is an official remake of Zee Telugu's TV series Varudhini Parinayam.

== Plot ==
Jay Khanolkar, a highly disciplined businessman emotionally guarded by his parents' broken marriage, and Sharvari Parab, a fierce, strong-willed college graduate who fiercely guards her identity and traditional values. Hailing from entirely different socio-economic backgrounds and possessing contrasting personalities, the two are at constant loggerheads as their families’ paths intertwine due to their siblings Gautam and Asavari fall in love. Their intense clash of egos and ideals creates a simmer of emotional friction, pushing both to their limits. However, as they navigate underlying vulnerabilities, domestic duties, and societal pressure, destiny forces them into close proximity, gradually turning their initial animosity into an unexpected romance.

== Cast ==
=== Main ===
- Raj Hanchnale as Jay Khanolkar
- Chinmayee Salvi as Sharvari Subhash Parab

=== Recurring ===
Parab family

- Meghana Erande as Pramila Subhash Parab (Pama)
- Suhas Shirsat as Subhash Parab
- Jui Gogri as Asawari Subhash Parab (Aashu)
- Shweta Gaikwad as Anushri Subhash Parab
- Ruchi Nerurkar as Mayuri Subhash Parab

Khanolkar family

- Aditi Sarangdhar as Tejaswini Khanolkar
- Sanjit Pednekar as Gautam Khanolkar
- Palvi Kadam as Sakshi Khanolkar / Sakshi Aakash Naik

Naik family

- Nikhilesh Godbole as Dinesh Naik
- Sumedha Datar / Neha Kulkarni as Uma Dinesh Naik
- Swaraj Ajay as Aakash Dinesh Naik
- Manasi Natekar as Samaira Dinesh Naik

Others

- Nimish Kulkarni as Makrand Mayekar (Mac)
- Kunal Dhumal as Gautam Bandekar
- Nilesh Deshpande as Vinayak Bandekar
- Radhika Chavan as Bhanu
- Samata Jadhav as Bindu
- Harshada Borge as Archana
- Suraj Nevrekar as Abhijeet
- Riya Dharmadhikari as Raavi Bhaskar
- Kajal Kate as Mrs. Chaudhari
- Shantanu Thavali as Rajveer
- Umesh Bane as Mr. Manchekar

=== Cameo appearances ===
- Chinmay Mandlekar as Satyajeet Pathare
- Kashyap Parulekar as Rajesh Shrivastav
- Anita Date-Kelkar as Radhika Subhedar
- Abhidnya Bhave as Kaushiki Khandekar
- Mugdha Karnik as Ahilyadevi Kirloskar
- Prashant Keni as Yuvraj Khandekar
- Prathamesh Laghate
- Arun Nalawade

== Awards ==
Zee Marathi Utsav Natyancha Awards 2026
Category	Recipient	Role	Ref.
Best Series	Sushma Sawant	Producer	
Best Actress	Chinmayee Salvi	Sharvari Parab	
Best Family		Parab Family	
Best Couple	Raj Hanchnale-Chinmayee Salvi	Jay-Sharvari	
ZEE5 Best Actor	Raj Hanchnale	Jay Khanolkar	

== Reception ==
=== Special episodes (1 hour) ===
- 5 April 2026
- 12 April 2026
- 31 May 2026
- 13 September 2026

=== Mahasangam ===
Date	Series	TVR	Ref.
18-22 May 2026	Kamli	2.6	

=== Ratings ===
Week	Year	BARC TVR	Rank		Ref.
Week	Year	BARC TVR	ZM	Mah/Goa	Ref.
Week 11	2026	2.5	5	7	
Week 20	2026	2.6	1	4	
Week 21	2026	2.3	2	5	
Week 23	2026	2.7	2	3	
Week 24	2026	2.8	2	3	

== Adaptations ==
Language	Title	Original release	Network	Last aired	Notes
Telugu	Varudhini Parinayam వరూధినీ పరిణయం	5 August 2013	Zee Telugu	10 August 2016	Original
Tamil	Poove Poochudava பூவே பூச்சூடவா	24 April 2017	Zee Tamil	4 September 2021	Remake
Kannada	Gattimela ಗಟ್ಟಿಮೇಳ	11 March 2019	Zee Kannada	5 January 2024	Remake
Malayalam	Pookkalam Varavayi പൂക്കാലം വരവായ്	1 July 2019	Zee Keralam	26 September 2021	Remake
Odia	Sathire ସାଥିରେ	3 October 2022	Zee Sarthak	30 September 2023	Remake
Punjabi	Dildariyan ਦਿਲਦਾਰੀਆਂ	14 November 2022	Zee Punjabi	6 October 2023	Remake
Bengali	Mon Dite Chai মন দিতে চাই	2 January 2023	Zee Bangla	24 May 2024	Remake
Marathi	36 Guni Jodi ३६ गुणी जोडी	23 January 2023	Zee Marathi	24 December 2023	Remake
Marathi	Sanai Chaughade सनई चौघडे	16 March 2026	Zee Marathi	Ongoing	Remake
Hindi	Shubh Shagun Shehnaiyan शुभ शगुन शहनाइयाँ	30 November 2026	Zee TV	Ongoing	Remake
