= Andondittu Kaala =

Indian Kannada-language romantic drama film

Andodittu Kaala
- Theatrical release poster
- Directed by: Keerthi Krishnappa
- Written by: Keerthi Krishnappa
- Screenplay by: Keerthi Krishnappa; Sharan Almel
- Story by: Keerthi Krishnappa
- Produced by: Bhuvan Suresh
- Starring: Vinay Rajkumar; Aditi Prabhudeva; Nisha Ravikrishnan; V. Ravichandran
- Cinematography: Abhishek G. Kasaragodu
- Edited by: A. R. Krishna; Suresh Armugam
- Music by: V. Raghavendra
- Production company: Bhuvan Movies
- Release date: 29 August 2025
- Running time: 115 minutes
- Country: India
- Language: Kannada

Andodittu Kaala (transl. Those were the times) is a 2025 Indian Kannada-language romantic drama film written and directed by Keerthi Krishnappa, in his debut. It was produced by Bhuvan Suresh under Bhuvan Movies banner. The film stars Vinay Rajkumar and Aditi Prabhudeva in the lead roles, while Nisha Ravikrishnan, Aruna Balraj and Kaddipudi Chandru play supporting roles. Actor-director V. Ravichandran features in a guest appearance. The music was composed by V. Raghavendra, while the cinematography is by Abhishek S. Kasaragodu.

Andondittu Kaala was first announced and went on floors in February 2021 as a period drama film set in the 1990s. After several announcements on release, the film finally got a delayed release date as 29 August 2025. Upon release, the film met with mixed reviews from critics and had a low start at the box-office.

== Premise ==
A young boy, Kumara, dreams of becoming a director after witnessing a shooting in his film. Years later, in order to fulfil his dreams, he moves to the city and strives to overcome challenges.

== Cast ==
- Vinay Rajkumar as Kumara
- Aditi Prabhudeva as Vasundhara
- Nisha Ravikrishnan as Saakshi
- Aruna Balraj as Kumara's mother
- Doddarange Gowda as teacher
- Kaddipudi Chandru as Sampangi
- Mohan Juneja
- Jaggappa
- Dharmendra Urs
- Govinde Gowda
- Thukali Santhosh
- V. Ravichandran in a guest appearance

== Soundtrack ==
The soundtrack, composed by V. Raghavendra consists of three tracks. The first single "Mungaru Maleyalli" sung by Sid Sriram was released on 28 January 2025. The audio rights were acquired by A2 Music.

Track listing
No.	Title	Lyrics	Singer(s)	Length
1.	"Maharaja Agendu"	Kinnal Raj	Sunil Kashyap	4:23
2.	"Are Are Yaro Evalu"	Arasu Anthare	Nihal Tauro	4:01
3.	"Mungaru Maleyalli"	Dhananjay Ranjan	Sid Sriram	5:03
Total length:				12:36

== Reception ==
=== Critical response ===
A. Sharadhaa of Cinema Express rated the film 2.5/5 stars and wrote, "The film lingers on the fragile yet transformative power of childhood fascination. Yet in its attempt to be both memoir and universal statement, it never fully balances the two. Many aspirants may see themselves in Kumar, but they may also wish the storytelling was as uncompromising as the dream itself."

Susmita Sameera of The Times of India rated the film 3/5 stars and wrote, "Ultimately, Andondittu Kaala is a warm, family-friendly entertainer that celebrates cinema and the determination to dream. Though the latter half feels stretched, the film remains heartfelt, nostalgic, and inspiring."
