= Bharya (TV series) =

Indian television drama series

- Genre: Crime; Drama; Thriller; Revenge; Action
- Written by: Pradeep Panicker
- Directed by: V.K. Girish Kumar / Manu Sudhakaran
- Starring: Mridula Vijay; Arun G. Raghavan; Sajan Surya
- Country of origin: India
- Original language: Malayalam
- No. of episodes: 860

Production
- Producer: R. Ramesh Babu
- Cinematography: Rajiv Mankompu / Prince Das
- Editor: Rajesh Thrissur
- Camera setup: Multi-camera
- Running time: 22 minutes
- Production company: Rise sun Pictures

Original release
- Network: Asianet
- Release: 16 May 2016 – 27 April 2019

Bharya (transl. Wife) is an Indian Malayalam-language television thriller drama television series that premiered on 16 May 2016 on Asianet. Mridula Vijay, Sajan Surya, Arun G Raghavan, Rajesh Hebbar, Ronson Vincent, Alina Padikkal and Keerthana Podhuval play the lead.

The show aired its climax in a one-hour episode on 26 and 27 April 2019, completing 860 episodes.

== Plot ==
Bharya tells the story of a family residing in Vrindavanam. Nandan and Rohini are the children of Professor, Vishwanatha Menon and Jayaprabha Teacher. They lead a life with little contact to the outside world.

Although Rohini was previously married to a Vrindavanam resident, Sharath, she was later widowed. However, even after more than 4 years, she is unable to acknowledge this. Having moved back to her parents' home with her daughter, Rohini continues to believe that Sharath will return. Nandan - without his parents' permission - marries his love interest, Nayana, and takes her to Vrindavanam. His family does not know that Nayana and her family are a band of antisocials who serve as human parasites.

Nayana's brother Narendran is also their town's rowdy, but people from Vrindavanam seems to have no idea about it. Narendran lusts after Rohini and Nayana starts to work her cruel and devilish activities. Initially shocked, but the family accepts identity of their daughter in law after a long period, but Nandan did not and is blinded by Nayana's feminine charms. Rohini marries Jose for protection from Narendran.

The teledrama is a daily bit for vicarious traumatization of ill family styles and instructive aid on such ways. Rakhi (Rohini and Nadan's younger sister) died by hanging herself because of Jose (that is what they think) but it was actually because of Sharath the villain. Sharath's true nature is exposed to everyone. Meanwhile, Nayana who re-entered the Vrindavan house as she was pregnant, was hated by everyone in the house. She delivers a baby girl, who the Vrindavan family refuses to accept as their own. However, Rohini visits the baby in the hospital. Finally it is revealed that person is there in the name of Sharath is not Rohini's husband, the real Sharath. But he is Suresh aka Vidura Sura. An evil womanizer and wanted criminal. Who is the look alike of Sharath. When Rohini gave birth to her child, Sharath was coming to meet them but he was beaten and thrown to a railway track because he looks identical to the criminal. They thought he was Vidura Sura. In that same time Vidura met Sharath and seeing his resemblance to him. He took Sharath's identity and pretended to be Sharath to everyone. Finally, the real Sharath came back and Vidura Sura was killed by Rohini. Now Sharath is being hunted by people mistaking his identity as the deceased criminal. Naran marries Mochitha and she became pregnant. Naran knows about Sharath shares Momochitha.

Now the main lead characters changes to Sharath (Arun G Raghavan) and Rohini (Mridula Vijay). It has now come to knowledge that Rohini's original husband Sharath is alive. Jose (Rajesh Hebbar) compels Naran to disturb Sharath in any way so as to make Rohini his own. In the end, Jose gives Rohini to Sharath.

== Cast ==
=== Main ===
- Sonu Satheesh Kumar / Mridula Vijay as Rohini Sharath
- Sajan Surya as Narendran or Naran/Vakathi Naran
- Arun G Raghavan as Vithura Sura/ Suresh/Sarath/ Surya/ Shahjahan/ Shankar Das/ Krishnaprasad/ Arjun/ Shakthi/ Yamini
- Ronson Vincent / Ashwanth Thilak as Nandan
- Rajesh Hebbar as Jose
- Alina Padikkal as Nayana Nandan
- Binny George as Merlin

=== Recurring ===
- Aishwarya Mithun Koroth / Keerthana Podhuval as CI Moujitha Naran
- Souparnika Subhash as Leena Surya
- Sunitha / Lintu Rony as Rahana Shajahan
- E.A. Rajendran as Jaganathan / Jaggu / Jagan, Naran and Nayana's father
- Devi Chandana as Durga: Naran and Nayana's mother
- Yuvarani as Jayaprabha Teacher: Mother of Rohini, Nandan, Rakhi
- Ilavarasan as Prof. Vishwanathan: Father of Rohini, Nandan, Rakhi
- Akhil Anand as Onthu Kuttan: Naren's friend and Nandan's assistant
- Baby Keziya / Baby Krishna Priya as Lechu, Sharath and Rohini's daughter
- Sethu Lakshmi as Ammachi, Jose's mother
- Vijayakumari as Moothumma, Rahana's grandmother
- Shobi Thilakan as SI Balaraman
- Harisree Martin as Puthur Dinakaran/ Duplicate Bapa/ Beeran/ Sharavanan
- Vijayan Karanthoor as Hajiar, Rahana's father
- Jennifer Antony as Gandhari Amma
- Dominic Chittat as Captain
- Hari as Ajayan: Nandan's family friend & advisor
- Rajkumar as DySP Mathews
- Sreekala as Sarath's mother
- Asritha Kingini as Kaveri, Gandhari Amma's daughter
- Sidharaj as Narayana Gowda
- Jayaprakash as Iyyer, Gandhari Amma's manager
- Azeez Nedumangad as Shivaprasad, director of Nayana's serial
- Kulappulli Leela as Nayana's Grandmother
- KPAC Leelamani as Chechi
- Akshara S.P./Blessy Kurien as Rakhi
- Bindu Aneesh as Ayisha: Rahana's mother
- Sunil Parackal as Nawas: Rahana's brother
- Jose Peroorkada as Kurukan Saji: Naren's old assistant
- Haridas Varkala as Thankappan
- Ashraf Pezhumoodu as serial producer
- Mukesh M Nair as Tamil serial producer
- Niyaz Khan as Neeraj, Rakhi's fiancé
- Amboori Jayan as Sahadevan(dead)
- Sarath Swamy as Manuel(dead)
- Sumi Rashik as Pavithra
- Bindu Murali as Valyammachi
- Mohan Raj as Keerikkadan Jose (cameo)
- Vanchiyoor Praveen Kumar as Brocker
- Harijith Alangad
- Yuva Krishna as Journalist (cameo)
- Dayana Hameed as News reader (cameo)
- Arya Rohit as Kadambari Krishnaprasad, Gowda's daughter

== Adaptations ==
Language	Title	Release date	Network(s)	Last aired	Notes
Malayalam	Bharya ഭാര്യ	16 May 2016	Asianet	27 April 2019	Original
Telugu	Bharya భార్య	12 March 2018	Star Maa	16 February 2019	Remake
Kannada	Marali Bandhalu Seethe ಮರಳಿ ಬಂದಳು ಸೀತೆ	25 February 2019	Star Suvarna	3 April 2020	Remake
