= Pookkalam Varavayi (TV series) =

2019 Indian Malayalam language TV series

- Genre: Action, romance, drama
- Written by: Praveen Eravankara
- Directed by: T.S. Saji/Shiju Aroor
- Starring: Mridula Vijay; Arun G Raghavan
- Country of origin: India
- Original language: Malayalam
- No. of episodes: 581

Production
- Producers: Modi Mathew; Pious Alunkal; Jayachandran
- Camera setup: Multi-camera
- Running time: 22 minutes
- Production company: Classic Frames

Original release
- Network: Zee Keralam
- Release: 1 July 2019 – 26 September 2021

Related
- Varudhini Parinayam

Pookkalam Varavayi (transl. Flowers are coming) is an Indian Malayalam-language television series which premiered from 1 July 2019 on Zee Keralam. It stars Mridula Vijay and Arun G Raghavan in lead roles. The show aired its last episode on 26 September 2021. This show is the remake of Zee Telugu TV series Varudhini Parinayam.

== Plot ==
Abhimanyu and Samyukta meet in an automobile accident and instantly hate each other, but conspire to help Abhimanyu's brother Harshan who has fallen in love with Samyukta's sister Sapthathi, although Sapthathi is engaged to a man called Ramesh Babu because of her parents' insistence. Sapthathi and Harshan fall in love after seeing each other at Sapthathi's cousin brother's wedding (Aromal) and Harshan's sister's wedding (Madhuri). Avanthika, who is Sapthathi's cousin and Aromal's sister gets jealous of this because she dislikes a poor girl like Sapthathi marrying a rich man like Harshan. Following a series of misunderstandings, Sapthathi's marriage to Ramesh Babu is called off and the new match proposed. Sapthathi's parents agree but Harshan's mom Sharmila insists that Abhimanyu marry first as the eldest son. Though he is a woman hater with no interest in marriage, Abhi says he will marry his employee, Nithya.

Samyukta learns that Sharmila has ill intentions and Sharmila threatens to have Sapthathi killed if Samyukta doesn't stop the marriage. Samyukta is suspicious when Nithya disappears, but it turns out that Abhi was never serious about the marriage and paid Nithya to pretend. Abhimanyu's relatives suggest that he marry Samyukta and he asks her to refuse his proposal before their families. However, she accepts it so that her sister can get married and they are soon married, as are Harshan and Sapthathi.

Both couples move into the family home, though Abhimanyu and Samyukta continue to quarrel. Sharmila consults an astrologer and convinces Sapthathi that there is a threat to Harshan's life, and tell Sapthathi that she must not consummate their marriage for 6 months, which was Subatra and Avanthika's plan to distance the couple. Sapthathi makes excuses to postpone the consummation of their marriage to save Harshan, and the couple faces ongoing interference from his relatives. Samyukta later learns that the astrologer is a cheat but when she tells Sapthathi she doesn't believe her stating that Sharmila, Jyothirmayi and Avanthika would never do such a thing.

Avanthika moves into the home in a scheme of Sharmila's, and she tries to come between Harshan and Sapthathi. Samyukta warns Sapthathi that Avanthika is a fake but Avanthika acts like she has changed so Sapthathi does not heed Samyukta's advice but trusts Avanthika, who helps to frame Samyukta for the theft of family heirlooms, and then plans a trick on Samyukta who calls the police and Avanthika forces Sapthathi to tell the police that Samyukta has a mental illness. Abhi becomes slightly sympathetic and seems to grow closer to Samyukta. However, he gives her divorce papers on his birthday. Samyukta challenges him to give her a year to make him fall in love with her, which he accepts.

Abhi's pregnant sister Madhuri moves into the household and becomes an ally to Samyukta. In a complicated plot they put pressure on Sharmila, by putting things in Sapthathi's drink to make her sick, which helps them fake a pregnancy for Sapthathi. When the pregnancy is confirmed by two doctors Samyukta and Madhuri is called, Sapthathi gets worried because she has not consummated her marriage yet. Sharmila shouts at her thinking that she did consummate. Avanthika, Jyothirmayi and Sharmila are thinking of a plan when Samyukta calls Sapthathi and makes her listen to them talking about their schemes. Sapthathi confronts them for their underhanded behaviour.

Samyukta's old college friend Sruthi begins working for Abhi's business. They conspire to make Abhi jealous by faking calls to Samyukta from a man named Indrajith. Shruthi eventually impersonates Indrajith and visits the home, but Abhi gives Shruthi/Indrajith his blessing to marry Samyukta. Indrajith/Shruthi instead challenges Abhi to three tasks to test whether he loves Samyukta. Abhi, however, fails in all 3 tests and confesses his love for Samyukta. He then witnesses an attack on Samyukta by a man employed by Sharmila. Abhimanyu files an FIR and the police get the truth out of Samyukta's attacker. However, the police blackmail Sharmila for money and she agrees to hand over the money. Her secret is kept safe.

Sharmila hatch many plans to separate Abhimanyu and Samyukta. But Samyukta wins every time and gets very much closer to Abhi. When Samvrutha, Samyukta's sister learns about Samyukta's divorce through her friend Sarath who is also Samyukta and Abhi's divorce lawyer and love interest of Samvrutha they both plan to make Abhimanyu and Samyukta close. As a part of their plan, they arrange for an outing for the couple but it is postponed by Sharmila. In A turn of events, it is also revealed that Harshan and Sarath were college buddies and had once promised that their respective wives should be sisters. Meanwhile, Samyukta's family move into Abhimanyu's house as their house has been conquered by their owner's son which is a plan of Sharmila to make them stay here and humiliate them which will result in Samyukta leaving the house.

Meanwhile, Sapthathi and Harshan consummate their marriage thanks to helping of Samyukta and Sapthathi becomes pregnant. Later Sarath and his friend doubt whether Samvrutha loves Sarath and make a drama which makes Samvrutha and Sarath confess their love.

As Abhimanyu's and Samyukta's marriage happened in a rush, Abhi and Samyukta's family plans another wedding for them. Sharmila kidnaps Samvrutha and Sarath on eve of the wedding to frame them of eloping. But Abhi finds out about their kidnap and rushed to rescue them but he is also kidnapped by the goons. Samyukta finds this on the day of marriage and rescues Abhi, Samvrutha, Sarath with the help of ranbir and police.

Meanwhile, Samyukta's father discovers Sharmila and her mother's evil plans and threatens them that he will reveal the truth. Sharmila kills him which is witnessed by Sarayu but her aide prevents Sarayu from shouting for help. Everybody starts asking for Samyukta, Abhimanyu, Samvrutha and there comes a letter stating that Samvrutha has eloped with Sarath (letter written by Sharmila) and Sharmila makes Yatheendran's death appear to be a suicide owing to the elopement of his third daughter which convinces everyone including Samyukta. Sarayu later manages to flee from the clutches of Sharmila's hired goon but is knocked down to temporary paralysis.

== Cast ==
=== Main ===
- Mridula Vijay as Samyuktha Abhimanyu
  - Second daughter of Yatheendran and Parvathy; Sharmila and Rajashekharan's daughter-in-law; Sapthathi, Samvurtha, Sarayu's sister; Abimanyu's wife
- Arun G Raghavan as Abhimanyu Rajashekharan
  - Sharmila and Rajashekharan's adopted son; Yatheendran and Parvathy son-in-law; Harshan, Madhuri, Ashokan's brother; Samyuktha's husband

=== Recurring ===
- Arathy Sojan / Anjusree Bhadran / Ardra Das as Sapthathi Harshan
  - Eldest daughter of Yatheendran and Parvathy; Samyuktha, Samvurtha, Sarayu's sister; Sharmila and Rajashekharan's daughter in law; Harshan's wife
- Niranjan Sreenath as Harshan Rajashekharan
  - Sharmila and Rajashekharan's son; Madhuri and Abhimanyu's brother; Yatheendran and Parvathy's son-in-law; Sapthadi's husband
- Rekha Ratheesh / Reshmi Boban as Parvathy Yatheendran
  - Mother of Sapthathi, Samyuktha, Samvrutha and Sarayu; Abhimannyu and Harshan's mother-in-law and Yatheedran's wife
- Manu Varma as Yatheendran
  - Father of Sapthathi, Samyuktha, Samvrutha and Sarayu; Abhimannyu and Harshan's Father-in-law and Parvathy's husband
- Sonia Jose as Sharmila
  - Mother of Abimanyu, Madhuri and Harshan; mother-in-law of Samyuktha and Sapthathi; wife of Rajashekharan
- Prabha Shankar as Rajashekaran
  - Father of Abimanyu, Madhuri and Harshan; father-in-law of Samyuktha and Sapthathi; Sharmila's husband

=== Others ===
- Prakrithi as Samvrutha Yatheedran
  - Third daughter of Parvathy and Yatheedran; Samyuktha, Sapthathi, Sarayu's sister; and Sarath's love interest
- Renimol Sabu as Sarayu Yatheedran
  - Last daughter of Parvathy and Yatheedran; Sapthathi, Samyuktha, Samrutha's sister
- Lekshmi Pramod / Sruthy Surendran as Avanthika Purashuthaman
  - Daughter of Parameshwari and Purashuthaman; Aromal's sister; Sapthathi, Samyuktha, Samvrutha, Sarayu's cousin
- Sindhu Varma as Parameshwari
  - Parvathy's elder sister; mother of Avanthika and Aromal; mother-in-law of Aadhuri and Purashuthaman's wife
- Valsala Menon as Karthyayaniamma
  - Abimannyu, Harshan, Madhuri's grandmother; mother of Rajashegaran; mother-in-law of Sharmila
- Kezia Joseph as Madhuri Aromal
- Bimal Khadhar as Aromal
- Renjith Menon as Advocate Sharath
- Jishin Mohan as Ashokan
- Uma Nair as Jyothi, Sharmila's sister
- Maneesha K. Subrahmaniam as Saudamini, Rajashekaran's sister
- Beena Antony as Kalyani Kutty
- Maneesh Krishna as Ramesh Babu
- Kanakalatha as Doctor
- Chilanka S Deedhu as Nithya
- Sumi Santhosh as Advocate
- Vedha Biju as Jithan/Sruthi
- Ambika Mohan as legal counselor
- Ameya Nair as Adv. Damayanthi
- Vishnu Pillai as Shyju
- Sojan as an astrologist

== Adaptations ==
Language	Title	Original release	Network	Last aired	Notes
Telugu	Varudhini Parinayam వరూధినీ పరిణయం	5 August 2013	Zee Telugu	10 August 2016	Original
Tamil	Poove Poochudava பூவே பூச்சூடவா	24 April 2017	Zee Tamil	4 September 2021	Remake
Kannada	Gattimela ಗಟ್ಟಿಮೇಳ	11 March 2019	Zee Kannada	5 January 2024	Remake
Malayalam	Pookkalam Varavayi പൂക്കാലം വരവായ്	1 July 2019	Zee Keralam	26 September 2021	Remake
Odia	Sathire ସାଥିରେ	3 October 2022	Zee Sarthak	30 September 2023	Remake
Punjabi	Dildariyan ਦਿਲਦਾਰੀਆਂ	14 November 2022	Zee Punjabi	6 October 2023	Remake
Bengali	Mon Dite Chai মন দিতে চাই	2 January 2023	Zee Bangla	24 May 2024	Remake
Marathi	36 Guni Jodi ३६ गुणी जोडी	23 January 2023	Zee Marathi	24 December 2023	Remake
Marathi	Sanai Chaughade सनई चौघडे	16 March 2026	Zee Marathi	Ongoing	Remake
Hindi	Shubh Shagun Shehnaiyan शुभ शगुन शहनाइयाँ	30 November 2026	Zee TV	Ongoing	Remake
