= Mangala Gowri Maduve =

Indian television drama

- Also known as: Putta Gowri Maduve (former name)
- Genre: Drama
- Directed by: K.S. Ramji
- Starring: See below
- Theme music composer: Karthik Sharma
- Country of origin: India
- Original language: Kannada
- No. of seasons: 2
- No. of episodes: 3,026

Production
- Camera setup: Multi-camera
- Running time: 07:00 PM

Original release
- Network: Colors Kannada
- Release: 24 December 2012 – 9 October 2022

Related
- Balika Vadhu

Mangala Gowri Maduve was an Indian Kannada language television drama series. It aired on Colors Kannada and is directed by K.S. Ramji. It is the sequel of Putta Gowri Maduve, premiered on 24 December 2012. This is the longest-running Kannada television series and one of the longest-running Indian TV serials. The series finale was aired on 9 October 2022 after eleven years on air.

Putta Gowri Maduve started off as a remake of Colors TV's Hindi drama Balika Vadhu, but later deviated from it entirely.

Originally Putta Gowri Maduve starred Ranjani Raghavan and Rakksh.

In 2018, Kavya Shree and Gagan Chinappa became the main leads and the series was renamed to Mangala Gowri Maduve on 6 April 2019. In March 2019, Chandrakala Mohan playing Rajeshwari quit the series with the death of her character.

== Synopsis ==
The series started with the journey of ten-year-old, Putta Gowri, who was forced to marry a boy named Mahesh of the same age. Her life turned upside down as she tries to adjust to traditions and customs of her in-laws. The story then advanced to her adulthood as she raises her voice against orthodox rituals.

Mahesh became a doctor and fell for his fellow doctor Hima. Her father and her father's sister plotted against Putta Gowri. They trick her to get Mahesh and Hima married. But Mahesh later realises that he loves only Gowri. Mahesh finally reunites with Putta Gowri in the end. Hima's father then repents for ruining his daughter's life.

The renamed series title concentrates on the lives of Mangala Gowri and Rajeev. Mangala Gowri is the niece of Mahesh and the great-granddaughter of Rajeshwari aka Ajjamma. She is rebellious, but unexpectedly marries IPS officer Rajeev.

== Cast ==
=== Putta Gowri Maduve ===
==== Main ====
- Rakksh as Mahesh Chandra/Mahi
- Ranjani Raghavan as Gowri Mahesh/Putta Gowri: Mahesh's wife

==== Recurring ====
- Namratha Gowda as Hima: Mahesh's ex-girlfriend and ex-wife; Gowri's friend
- Sameer Puranik as young Mahesh
- Sanya Iyer as young Putta Gowri
- Ankita Amar as young Suguna: elder sister of Mahesh
- Shishir Shastry as young Shyam: Suguna's husband
- Sindhu Kalyan as Sagari: Hima's aunt
- Chandrakala Mohan as Rayadurga Rajeshwari/Ajjamma: Mahesh's grandmother
- Suneel Puranik
- Ruthu as Kamali: Mahesh's aunt
- Gopal Krishna as Jagadish: Gowri's father
- Kavya Shree as Mangala Gowri: Mahesh's niece, daughter of Shyam and Suguna, introduced before renaming
- Harini Chandra as Bhagya: Gowri's mother
- Suchetan Rangaswamy
- Koli Ramya as Kamli

=== Mangala Gowri Maduve ===
==== Main ====
- Kavyashree as Mangala Gowri: Shyam and Suguna's daughter
- Pruthvi Nandan as Rajeev: SP (police officer), Anu's son (2019–2022)
  - Gagan Chinnappa as Rajeev: SP Police Officer
- Yashaswini as Sneha: Rajiv's fiancée and, later, Rajiv's wife
- Aishwarya Sindhogi as Tanisha: Soundarya'sister
- Tanisha Kuppandha as Soundarya: Rajiv's enemy and Rajiv's brother's wife
  - Radhika Minchu as Soundarya
- Shubha Raksha as Sheethal
- Hanumanthe Gowda as Shivaprasad, Public Prosecutor

==== Recurring ====
- Sushmitha as Neeli: Balli's sister
- Veena Venkateshas: Head of the Rajeev family (Vasu)
- Manasa Joshi as Rayadurga Rajeshwari
- Shourya as Surya: Sneha's brother

== Reception ==
Putta Gowri Maduve received criticism for to its elongated plots and tracks like lead character Putta Gowri surviving a tiger attack, snake bite in forests and she shown pregnant for more than a year. Despite, it was one among the most watched Kannada drama.

It was the sixth most watched Kannada television during 2013. As in week 23 of 2019, it was at fourth position with 3.84 million impressions. Even in 2020, the serial with the new name and plot held its position among top 5 most watched Kannada shows in BARC ratings.

== Adaptations ==
Language	Title	Original release	Network(s)	Last aired	Notes
Hindi	Balika Vadhu बालिका वधू	21 July 2008	Colors TV	31 July 2016	Original
Kannada	Putta Gowri Maduve ಪುಟ್ಟ ಗೌರಿ ಮದುವೆ	24 December 2012	Colors Kannada	9 October 2022	Remake
Bengali	Gouridaan গৌরিডান	15 April 2014	Colors Bangla	19 September 2015	Remake
