= Talwalkar =

Talwalkar is an Indian surname under Karhade and Gaud Saraswat Brahmin community.

It may refer to:

- Abhi Talwalkar (born 1964), Indian businessman, was president and CEO of LSI Corporation
- Govind Talwalkar (1925–2017), Indian journalist, editor and author
- Hemant Talwalkar (1954–2016), Indian cricketer
- Jayshree Talwalkar, also known as Didi, Indian philosopher, spiritual leader, social reformer
- Padma Talwalkar (born 1949), Indian classical vocalist
- Sharad Talwalkar (1918–2001), Indian film, television and stage actor in Marathi Film Industry and Theatre
- Smita Talwalkar (1954–2014), Indian Marathi film actress, producer and director
- Sulekha Talwalkar, Indian Marathi film, television and theatre actress
- Suresh Talwalkar (born 1948), Indian musician

== See also ==
- Talwalkars, Indian large chain of health clubs
