= Sulekha Talwalkar =

Indian film, television and theatre actress

- Born: Sulekha Dharadhar; 8 October 1976 (age 49)
- Occupation: Actress
- Spouse: Amber Talwalkar
- Children: 2
- Relatives: Smita Talwalkar (mother-in-law)

Sulekha Talwalkar is an Indian actress working in Marathi film, television and theatre.

== Career ==
Sulekha Talwalkar entered into an acting career while she was studying at the Ramnarain Ruia College, Matunga, Mumbai. She was part of the theatre group Natyawalay where she acted in her first commercial play Saatchya Aat Gharat. A film with the same name was later created in 2004 on similar story line. Her first television show was Teri Bhi Chup Meri Bhi Chup that aired on Zee TV. She later on acted in various Hindi TV shows of Adhikari Brothers. In 1995, she played the side role of Shefali Jadhav in the Marathi film Aai which was directed by Mahesh Manjrekar.

Sulekha Talwalkar played various side roles in popular Marathi television shows like Avantika, Asambhav, Kunku, Shejari Shejari Pakke Shejari, Majha Hoshil Na and Savlyachi Janu Savali aired on Zee Marathi. In 2007, she acted in the film Chandrakant Kulkarni. Her 2008's film Tuzya Mazyat was loosely based on the 1998 English film Stepmom. Sulekha Talwalkar played second wife of Shashank (played by Sachin Khedekar) who is earlier married to Asmita (played by Mrinal Kulkarni) and also has two children. In 2009, she played the lead role in the film Tinhisaanja. The film was about the generation gap and taking care of one's older parents. Sandeep Kulkarni played her husband and her in-laws were played by actors Ramesh Deo and Ashalata Wabgaonkar. Her 2012 film Shyamche Vadil saw her playing the lead role of Leena, a shrewd wife who harasses her husband for not bringing the money for the household. After seeing such harassment for 22 years, their son Shyam decides to fight for his father's rights claiming their divorce. The role of father Madhav is played by Tushar Dalvi and of Shyam by debutant Chinmay Udgirkar.

Recently in 2012 she appeared in the Marathi play Mahasagar along with a star cast of Subodh Bhave, Ashalata Wabgaonkar, Shailesh Datar and others. Originally written by Jaywant Dalvi, the play was remade after 20 years by the actress Neelam Shirke under her banner Asmi Productions and directed by Neena Kulkarni. Directed by Vijaya Mehta, the original star cast included notable actors like Vikram Gokhale, Usha Nadkarni, Nana Patekar, Macchindra Kambli and Bharti Achrekar.

Since 2020, she's been hosting a YouTube talk show named "Dil Ke Kareeb" where she interacts with the personalities from the Marathi entertainment industry. New episodes are premiered every Saturday evening via her own YouTube channel.

== Personal life ==
Talwalkar was born as Sulekha Dharadhar on 8 October. She is the only child of her parents. She completed her education from King George School, Mumbai and Ramnarain Ruia College. She is married to Amber Talwalkar, who is one of the director of Talwalkars, a major chain of health club in India. Her mother-in-law Smita Talwalkar was a film and television producer and also actress. She has two children, a son named Arya Talwalkar and a daughter named Tia Talwalkar.

== Filmography ==
Year	Title	Role	Medium	Language	Notes
	Saatchya Aat Gharat		Theatre	Marathi	
	Teri Bhi Chup Meri Bhi Chup		Television	Hindi	aired on Zee TV
1994	Shrimaan Shrimati	Mamta	Television	Hindi	Played Bablu Sharma's sister-in-law in Episode 119
1995	Aai	Shefali Jadhav-Pradhan	Film	Marathi	
	Bolachich Kadhi Bolachach Bhaat		Television	Marathi	
	Jawaishodh		Television	Marathi	
	Shrawansari		Television	Marathi	aired on Alpha TV Marathi
2002-2005	Avantika	Ashwini	Television	Marathi	aired on Alpha TV Marathi
	Char Divas Sasuche		Television	Marathi	aired on ETV Marathi
2007	Kadachit		Film	Marathi	
2008	Asambhav	Poonam Shastri	Television	Marathi	aired on Zee Marathi
2008	Tuzya Mazyat	Radhika	Film	Marathi	
2009-2010	Agnihotra	Usha Vinayak Agnihotri / Kranti Band	Television	Marathi	aired on Star Pravah
2009	Tinhisaanja		Film	Marathi	
2009	Canvas		Film	Marathi	
2009	Man Udhan Varyache	Rajani Mohite	Television	Marathi	aired on Star Pravah
2009	Goshta Eka Anandichi		Television	Marathi	aired on Star Pravah
2010	Chaar Choughi	Gargi	Television	Marathi	aired on Star Pravah
2011	Kanyadan		Television	Marathi	aired on Mi Marathi
2011	Kunku		Television	Marathi	aired on Zee Marathi
2012	Shyamche Vadil	Leena	Film	Marathi	
2012	Mahasagar		Theatre	Marathi	
2013	Premachi Goshta	Ragini	Film	Marathi	
2013-2014	Shejari Shejari Pakke Shejari	Yamini Ballal Pathak	Television	Marathi	aired on Zee Marathi
2015	Ase He Kanyadan		Television	Marathi	aired on Zee Marathi
2016-2018	Saraswati	Aaisaheb	Television	Marathi	aired on Colors Marathi
2016	Family Katta	Veena Sabnis	Film	Marathi	
2018-2019	Tu Ashi Jawali Raha		Television	Marathi	aired on Zee Yuva
2020-2021	Majha Hoshil Na	Sharmila Shashikant Birajdar	Television	Marathi	aired on Zee Marathi
2020-2021	Sang Tu Aahes Ka?	Sulakshana	Television	Marathi	aired on Star Pravah
2022–present	Muramba	Akshay's mother	Television	Marathi	aired on Star Pravah
2024–present	Savlyachi Janu Savali	Tilottama Mehendale	Television	Marathi	aired on Zee Marathi
2025	Ashi Hi Jamva Jamvi		Film	Marathi	
