= Raja Shivchhatrapati (TV series) =

Marathi television program

- Genre: Historical drama
- Created by: Nitin Chandrakant Desai
- Based on: Raja Shivchhatrapati by Babasaheb Purandare
- Story by: Shirish Deshpande, Pratap Gangawane
- Directed by: Hemant Deodhar
- Starring: See below
- Theme music composer: Ashok Patki
- Opening theme: Jay Bhavani Jay Shivaji
- Composer: Ajay–Atul
- Country of origin: India
- Original language: Marathi
- No. of episodes: 214

Production
- Executive producer: Atul Ketkar
- Producers: Nitin Chandrakant Desai; Mina Chandrakant Desai; Neha Nitin Desai
- Production locations: ND Studios, Mumbai
- Camera setup: Multi-Camera
- Running time: 22 minutes
- Production company: Chandrakant Productions Pvt. Ltd.

Original release
- Network: Star Pravah
- Release: 24 November 2008 – 19 September 2009

Raja Shivchhatrapati is an Indian Marathi language historical drama television series based on Shivaji Maharaj, founder of the Maratha Kingdom which aired on Star Pravah. The serial was re-telecast in April 2020 during the COVID-19 pandemic.

== Summary ==
Chatrapati Shivaji Maharaj, born at Shivneri fort, establishes the Maratha kingdom against all odds by fighting against the Mughal dynasty.

== Cast ==
- Amol Kolhe as Chhatrapati Shivaji Maharaj
- Mrinal Kulkarni as Rajmata Jijabai
- Avinash Narkar as Shahaji Raje Bhosale
- Yatin Karyekar as Aurangzeb
- Rujuta Deshmmukh as Sai Bhonsale
- Neelam Shirke as Soyarabai
- Prasad Pandit as Baji Prabhu Deshpande
- Shantanu Moghe as Murarbaji
- Swapnil Rajshekhar as Netaji Palkar
- Sanjay Mohite as Bahirji Naik
- Sanjay Shejwal as Hiroji Farzand
- Vidyadhar Joshi as Jai Singh I
- Hardeek Joshi as Kartalab Khan
- Sunil Godse as Shaista Khan
- Samira Gujar as Putalabai
- Vijay Patwardhan as Pant
- Milind Safai as Mohammed Adil Shah
- Shailesh Pitambare as Afzal Khan

== Production ==
The program was created and produced by Hindi film's art director Nitin Chandrakant Desai. Amol Kolhe played lead role of Chhatrapati Shivaji Maharaj and Mrinal Kulkarni as Rajmata Jijabai. It was directed by Hemant Deodhar and filming took place at ND Studios, Karjat in Maharashtra. Balwant Moreshwar Purandare and Devendranath Kasar were consulted for historical content as can be seen from credit list of the serial.

=== Ratings ===
Week	Year	TAM TVR	Rank		Ref.
Week	Year	TAM TVR	Mah/Goa	All India	Ref.
Week 40	2009	0.85	2	78	
