= Grahan =

Grahan, Grahana, or Grahanam may refer to:

- Grahana, the Sanskrit term for an eclipse
- Grahan (film), a 2001 Indian film by Shashilal Nair
- Grahan (2018 TV series), an Indian Marathi-language horror series
- Grahan (2021 TV series), an Indian Hindi-language crime drama web series
- Grahana (film), a 1981 Indian Kannada-language drama film by T. S. Nagabharana
- Grahana (novel), a 1972 novel by Indian writer S. L. Bhyrappa
- Grahanam, a 2004 Indian Telugu-language film by Indraganti Mohan Krishna
