= Anand Abhyankar =

Indian actor (1963–2012)

- Born: 2 June 1963; Nagpur, Maharashtra, India
- Died: 24 December 2012 (aged 49); Pune, Maharashtra, India
- Occupation: Actor
- Spouse: Anjali Abhyankar
- Children: 2

Anand Abhyankar (2 June 1963 – 24 December 2012) was an Indian actor who appeared in Marathi film, television and theatre. He starred in films such as Spandan (2012), Balgandharva (2011), Matichya Chuli (2006), Vaastav (1999) and Jis Desh Mein Ganga Rehta Hain. On television, he is known for his roles in Mala Sasu Havi, Taarak Mehta Ka Ooltah Chashmah, Fu Bai Fu, Avaghachi Sansar and Asambhav.

Abhyankar died on 24 December 2012 in a car crash on the Mumbai-Pune expressway near the Urse toll booth.

== Early life and education ==
Abhyankar was born and brought up in Nagpur, Maharashtra in a middle-class family to parents, Moreshwar and Ashadevi, on 2 June 1963. His father was a labour welfare officer and his mother worked at the Indian Postal Service. Abhyankar completed his schooling from Nagpur and moved to Pune, Maharashtra to study commerce from the Garware College. He worked at Bajaj Auto for over two years before turning to acting professionally.

== Career ==
Abhyankar developed interest in acting while in college while performing in plays. Later, he joined various theatre groups. His first big break came with the commercial play Kuryat Sada Tingalam. Written by Shivraj Gorle, this comedy play was produced by Rasikraj Productions and directed by Mangesh Kadam. The play also starred actors Mohan Joshi and Suhasini Deshpande. The play was successful and performed more than 1000 shows. Abhyankar also performed in the Marathi play Aai Retire Hotey, alongside actress Bhakti Barve; this show was performed more than 950 times. He also played Paropkari Gampu and Gaja Khot for the theatrical adaptations of the book Vyakti Aani Valli written by Pu La Deshpande.

Abhyankar also played various cameo and side roles in many Marathi as well as Hindi films. His Bollywood films include Vaastav (1999) and Jis Desh Mein Ganga Rehta Hain (2000), both directed by Mahesh Manjrekar. He was seen in a few commercial advertisements as well. His film career in Marathi spanned from comedy, serious to character roles. In the 2006 film Matichya Chuli, he replaced the deceased actor Sudhir Joshi. The film thus has the same character played by two different actors. He also directed one Marathi film, Majhi Vithai Mauli.

Abhyankar starred in various Marathi television shows. His earliest roles include the show Gharkul that aired on DD Sahyadri. His recent role of Dinanath Shashtri from the serial Asambhav (2009) was of an 85-year-old man, almost double his age. His portrayal of a man suffering with Parkinson's disease was highly appreciated and won him awards. He also participated in the comedy competitive show Fu Bai Fu, paired with actress Supriya Pathare. Before his death in December 2012, Abhyankar was seen playing a character role in the Zee Marathi's show Mala Sasu Havi, alongside actress Asawari Joshi, which was later played by Rajan Bhise. His last Marathi film Gadbad Gondhal, directed by Yogesh Dattatraya Gosavi has released in 2018.

== Death ==
Abhyankar died in a car crash on Mumbai-Pune Expressway on 23 December 2012, when his Suzuki Wagon R was hit by a tempo (an Indian 3-wheel vehicle) coming from the opposite direction. He was returning to Mumbai after finishing the shoot of his upcoming film Duniyadari. Akshay Pendse, his co-star from the TV show Mala Sasu Havi and his two-year-old son Pratyush Pendse, also died in the same crash. Abhyankar is survived by his wife Anjali, a daughter and a son. His family filed for compensation in Motor Accident Claims Tribunal and received ₹72 lakh (US$75,000) in 2018.

== Filmography ==
=== Films ===
Year	Title	Role	Language
1998	Tu Tithe Mee		Marathi
1999	Ratra Aarambha		Marathi
1999	Vaastav		Hindi
2000	Jis Desh Mein Ganga Rehta Hain		Hindi
2001	Tera Mera Saath Rahen		Hindi
2001	Akleche Kande		Marathi
2004	Kunku Lavte Mahercha	Dinkar Deshmukh	Marathi
2006	Hi Porgi Kunachi	Deshmukh	Marathi
2006	Matichya Chuli		Marathi
2007	Bhulwa		Marathi
2008	Ek Vivaah... Aisa Bhi		Hindi
2008	Checkmate		Marathi
2009	Chal Chalein	Vaishnavi's father	Hindi
2009	Mareparyant Fashi	Writer	Marathi
2010	Pappu Can't Dance Saala		Hindi
2011	Balgandharva	Balgandharva's Mama	Marathi
2012	Spandan	Doctor (Cerebral Palsy)	Marathi
2013	Kokanastha	Posthumous release	Marathi
2018	Gadbad Gondhal	Akhilesh Desai (posthumous release)	Marathi

=== Television ===
Year	Title	Role	Language	Channel
1998-2001	Hum Sab Ek Hain	Episode 4 - Mr. Alexander Episode 41 - Mr. Matthew Episode 139 - Mr. Jackson/ Jaikishan	Hindi	Sony Entertainment Television
1999-2003	Aabhalmaya		Marathi	Alpha TV Marathi
	Gharkul		Marathi	DD Sahyadri
2004-2006	Vadalvaat		Marathi	Alpha TV Marathi
2006	Char Divas Sasuche		Marathi	ETV Marathi
2008-2010	Avaghachi Sansar	Raghunath Mohite	Marathi	Zee Marathi
2007-2009	Asambhav	Dinanath Shashtri	Marathi	Zee Marathi
2011	Taarak Mehta Ka Ooltah Chashmah	Bhau Kaka	Hindi	Sony Sab
2011	Fu Bai Fu	Contestant	Marathi	Zee Marathi
2012	Mala Sasu Havi	Aaba	Marathi	Zee Marathi

=== Theater ===
Title	Role
Kuryat Sada Tingalam	
Aai Retire Hotey	
Vyakti Aani Valli	Paropkari Gampu, Gaja Khot
Asa Me Kai Gunha Kela	
Ghetla Shingawar	
Pappa Sanga Kunache	
