= Grahan (2018 TV series) =

Marathi-language horror series

- Genre: Horror; Drama
- Starring: See below
- Country of origin: India
- Original language: Marathi
- No. of episodes: 103

Production
- Producer: Tejendra Neswankar
- Production locations: Mumbai, Maharashtra, India
- Camera setup: Multi-camera
- Running time: 22 minutes
- Production company: Trrump Carrd Production

Original release
- Network: Zee Marathi
- Release: 19 March – 14 July 2018

Grahan is an Indian Marathi language horror series which aired on Zee Marathi by replacing Gaav Gata Gajali. It starred Pallavi Joshi.

== Cast ==
- Pallavi Joshi as Vasudha Nevrekar / Chandi Sharangpani / Rama Abhay Potdar
- Sharvani Pillai as real Rama Abhay Potdar
- Sunil Barve as Abhay Ramakant Potdar
- Yogesh Deshpande as Niranjan
- Anant Bhave as Raghuveer Amaatya (Guest lecturer at Pritzker School of Medicine, University of Chicago)
- Pandharinath Kamble as Shankar
- Swapnali Patil as Mangal, Niranjan's wife
- Varsha Ghatpande as Niranjan's mother
- Neeraj Goswami as Dr. Siddharth
- Manjiri Pupala as Priyanka
- Vanashree Pande as Usha
- Abhijeet Chavan
- Ananda Karekar
- Umesh Jagtap as Vasudha's father
- Jaywant Wadkar
- Ved Ambre as Monu, Usha's son

== Special episode ==
- 15 April 2018
