= Anandache Jhaad =

- Theatrical release poster
- Directed by: Sanjay Surkar
- Produced by: Smita Talwalkar
- Starring: Vihing Nayak; Suhas Joshi; Sunil Barve; Shilpa Tulaskar; Prashant Damle
- Music by: Ashok Patki
- Release date: 13 October 2006
- Country: India
- Language: Marathi

Anandache Jhaad is a Marathi film released on 13 October 2006. The film has been directed by Sanjay Surkar and produced by Smita Talwalkar.

== Cast ==
The film stars Vihang Nayak, Suhas Joshi, Sunil Barve, Shilpa Tulaskar, Prashant Damle, Viju Khote, Aniket Vishwasrao and Prashant Dharia.

== Soundtrack ==
The music has been directed by Ashok Patki. Singer Geeta Masurekar makes a debut in Marathi with two songs.

=== Track listing ===
No.	Title	Length
1.	"Tula Shodhta"	5:28
2.	"Anandache Jhaad"	1:40
3.	"Butkyanchya Deshat Aamhi Unch Manse"	5:14
