= Asambhav (TV series) =

2007 Indian Marathi language TV series

- Genre: Drama; Suspense
- Written by: Vivek Agnihotri; Chinmay Mandlekar
- Directed by: Satish Rajwade; Sangeet Kulkarni
- Starring: See below
- Voices of: Swapnil Bandodkar; Madhuri Karmarkar
- Theme music composer: Swapnil Bandodkar
- Opening theme: Nainam Chhindanti Shrastrani, Nainam Dahati Pavaka
- Composers: Madhusudan Joshi; Guru Thakur
- Country of origin: India
- Original language: Marathi
- No. of episodes: 774

Production
- Executive producers: Nikhil Sane; Deepak Rajadhyaksha
- Producer: Pallavi Joshi
- Production location: Mumbai
- Cinematography: Sandy; V Shoaib
- Editor: Gaurav Meshram
- Camera setup: Multi-camera
- Running time: 22 minutes
- Production company: Atharva Communication

Original release
- Network: Zee Marathi
- Release: 12 February 2007 – 29 August 2009

Asambhav (transl. Impossible) is an Indian Marathi language television series which aired on Zee Marathi. The show starred Umesh Kamat, Manasi Salvi, Neelam Shirke and Urmilla Kanetkar in lead roles. It premiered from 12 February 2007 by replacing Vadalvaat.

The series is based on the concept of reincarnation in Hinduism. The drama revolved around the cast which were presented as the rebirths of the past life and the dramatic events that occurred in their lives. The screenplay was written by Chinmay Mandlekar and directed by Satish Rajwade.

== Plot ==
A young woman remembers the wrongs done to her in her past life and takes rebirth to avenge herself. As her mission unfolds, many secrets of the past are unveiled. Adinath Shastri, the second child of Madhusudan Shastri returns to India from the United States for a sabbatical and plans to marry Sulekha who is his aunt's sister. They fall in love over the internet and plan to marry as soon as he comes back and has plans to go back to the US with her. Adinath and Sulekha get engaged and plan to marry soon. However, fate takes an unexpected twist when he travels to Konkan for work and accidentally meets Shubhra after he meets with an accident. Shubhra lives with her mother and is supposed to marry Ramakant Khot. She nurses Adinath back to health and congratulates him on his engagement. Adinath is surprised as he does not remember telling Shubhra about it, to which she replies that she had a vision in which she saw him getting engaged. Adinath is taken by surprise. As a few days pass by, Shubhra and Adinath spend time together and get married without any plans. They return to the "Wada" (ancestral mansion) in Vasai (near Mumbai) on the day he was supposed to marry Sulekha, where his family members are in full swing with the marriage preparations. He introduces Shubhra as his wife to which everyone reacts atrociously. Sulekha is heartbroken and fumes at Adinath and Shubhra. Initially, the family members reject his decision but later accept Shubhra.

Adinath's grandfather - Dinanath Shastri says that Shubra has a striking resemblance to his sister-in-law Parvati Vahini who mysteriously disappeared about six decades ago. He welcomes Shubhra and regards her as the reincarnation of Parvati. That night, an old man by the name of Sopan (who used to be the servant at the Wada 60–70 years ago and now lived in the outhouse of the Wada) mysteriously disappears and later confronts Sulekha. At first, Sulekha doesn't pay any heed to him until he addresses her as Indumati and later explains to her that she is "his Indumati" who died mysteriously when he was young. (Here it is implied that Sulekha is, in fact, a reincarnation of Indumati, the antagonist) Sopan presents her with an ugly figurine that of a woman playing tambourine (later revealed to be the Idol of Fire Force used in black magic) and says that the figurine will help her regain her memories of past life and give her the strength to finish the goal which she had vowed then and returns to Wada. In the meantime, at the Shastri's, things go on in a mundane way until Shubra has visions again where she sees a black car hitting a teenage boy, although she doesn't know who the boy is. She has the visions repeatedly, but Adinath doesn't take it seriously. Later Shubra has a vision of the outhouse being set on fire and warns Adinath about it. A day later the outhouse really has a fire accident and Sopan escapes and takes refuge at Sulekha's house. Everyone considers Sopan as dead.

Adinath's nephew (Chandu's son) Prathamesh is mute but he mumbles and addresses Shubhra as Parvati even though no one tells him about her. He becomes friends with Shubra and both of them have a good understanding among themselves. Prathamesh behaves in a strange fashion and sketches all the visions Shubra has although no one tells him anything. Later on, it is revealed that Prathamesh is a re-incarnation of Goda (Indumati's younger sister), a timid but good maid who used to work at the Wada when Parvati existed. It is also revealed that Adinath is, in fact, the reincarnation of Mahadev Shastri (Parvati's husband, Dinanath's elder brother) and hence fate brought Shubhra and Adinath (past life's Parvati and Mahadev) together under mystical circumstances and got them married as strangers. Adinath's sister Priya Shastri has an unexplained resent towards Sulekha from the time Adinath introduces her to his family. As the story progresses, the visions seen by Shubhra come true. The boy seen by Shubhra is, in fact, Nikhil Shastri (Sulekha's nephew and Adinath's cousin) who is hit by the black car. (Sulekha hypnotizes Nikhil and hence causes the accident) and in a similar way brings about the death of her own mother, Kshipra, BalKrishna Shastri (her brother-in-law, Nikhil's father).

Shubra and Adinath consult a neurophysiologist Dr. Samant to regain the memories of their past life while in parallel Sulekha consults a lady by the name Tanishka to learn the art of mind control and hypnosis more profoundly. Dr. Samant is shown to be the reincarnation of Shrirang Ranade (Mahadev's best friend). Both Sulekha and Shubra dive into their past birth and the story unfolds that Parvati and Mahdev were once a happy couple but did not have any children and Parvati was a staunch believer of Krishna and plans to name her children after the names of Krishna (which unfortunately never happens). Dinanath Shastri hence fulfils her wish with his own children (Hence the names Madhusudan Shastri (Adinath's father, Balkrishna Shastri).

Meanwhile, in the village of Vasai two sisters, Goda and Indumati, arrive. Bhalchandra the brother-in-law of Mahadev has an extra marital affair with Indumati which when discovered infuriates the patriarch of the Shastri family (Mahadev's father) and he humiliates Indumati in front of the entire village by applying back colour on her face and making her ride a donkey. Simultaneously, a person by the name Shrirang Ranade comes to the Wada and Mahadev takes to the misunderstanding (thanks to Bhalchandra) that there is something going on between Parvati and him (Shrirang) and banishes Parvati from the Wada. Indumati (present day's Sulekha) then vows that she would destroy the Shastri family and uses black magic and kills everyone from Shastri family except young Dinanath Shastri (who is saved at the last moment by Parvati) and in the process, she, Indumati and Goda are buried alive in a landslide in the underground passageway near the wada. Since the story of revenge remains incomplete in the past birth, Indumati, Parvati, Goda, Mahadev and other characters take rebirth and finish the incomplete vows.

== Cast ==
=== Main ===
- Umesh Kamat as Adinath Shastri / Mahadev Shastri
- Manasi Salvi / Urmilla Kanetkar as Shubhra Shastri / Parvati Shastri
- Neelam Shirke as Sulekha Raut / Indumati

=== Recurring ===
Shastri family

- Anand Abhyankar as Dinanath Shastri
- Pradeep Velankar as Madhusudan Shastri
- Ila Bhate as Vasudha Shastri
- Sharvari Patankar as Priya Shastri
- Shailesh Datar as Balkrishna Shastri
- Sulekha Talwalkar / Madhurani Gokhale as Poonam Shastri
- Sagar Talashikar as Chandrakant Shastri
- Ashwini Ekbote as Radha Shastri
- Suhas Bhalekar / Sandeep Phatak as Sopan Shastri
- Aniruddha Deodhar as Prathamesh Shastri
- Vikas Patil / Aastad Kale as Nikhil Shastri
- Amita Khopkar as Kusum Shastri

Others

- Sunil Barve as Viraj Samant / Shrirang Ranade
- Satish Rajwade as Vikrant Bhosale
- Chinmay Mandlekar as Abhimaan Saranjame
- Kishor Kadam as Yashwant Saranjame
- Ashok Shinde as Bhalchandra
- Neha Joshi as Amruta
- Ajay Purkar as Inspector Vazalvar
- Meena Naik as Mrs. Raut
- Anil Gawas as Vishnu
- Seema Deshmukh as Bhagirathi
- Sujata Joshi as Kshipra
- Prafulla Samant as Raghunath
- Abhijeet Kelkar as Sadashiv
- Vrushali Kulkarni as Vasanti
- Mahesh Koli as Damodar
- Vidya Patwardhan as Yami
- Manjusha Godse as Tanishka
- Geetanjali Kulkarni as Goda
- Ashutosh Kulkarni as Swapnil
- Prasanna Ketkar as Ramakant
- Hridaynath Rane as Parmeshwar
- Asha Sathe as Kubdi
- Ishan Tambe as Dinu
- Kishor salvi as Big Dinu
- Ujjwala Jog

== Awards ==
Zee Marathi Utsav Natyancha Awards
| Year | Category | Recipient | Role |
|---|---|---|---|
| 2007 | Best Siblings | Umesh Kamat-Sharvari Patankar | Adinath-Priya |
| 2007 | Best Negative Male | Suhas Bhalekar | Sopan Shastri |
| 2007 | Best Negative Female | Neelam Shirke | Sulekha Raut |
| 2007 | Best Character Male | Anand Abhyankar | Dinanath Shastri |
| 2007 | Best Child Character | | Prathamesh Shastri |
| 2007 | Best Family | | Shastri Family |
| 2007 | Best Title Song | | |
| 2007 | Best Series | | |
| 2008 | Best Siblings | Umesh Kamat-Sharvari Patankar | Adinath-Priya |
| 2008 | Best Negative Male | Suhas Bhalekar | Sopan Shastri |
| 2008 | Best Negative Female | Neelam Shirke | Sulekha Raut |
| 2008 | Best Character Male | Anand Abhyankar | Dinanath Shastri |
| 2008 | Best Supporting Female | Sharvari Patankar | Priya Shastri |
| 2008 | Best Series | | |
| 2009 | Best Supporting Male | Ajay Purkar | Inspector Vazalvar |
| 2009 | Best Negative Female | Neelam Shirke | Sulekha Raut |
| 2009 | Best Father | Anand Abhyankar | Dinanath Shastri |
| 2009 | Best Mother | Ila Bhate | Vasudha Shastri |
| 2009 | Best Family | | Shastri Family |

== Adaptations ==
| Language | Title | Original release | Network(s) | Last aired | Notes |
|---|---|---|---|---|---|
| Marathi | Asambhav असंभव | 12 February 2007 | Zee Marathi | 29 August 2009 | Original |
| Bengali | Asambhab অসমভ | 1 September 2008 | Zee Bangla | 14 November 2009 | Remake |
