= Sakvarbai =

- Maharani of the Maratha Kingdom

Queen consort of Maratha Empire
- Tenure: 1674 - 1680
- Predecessor: Soyarabai
- Successor: Yesubai

Rajmata of Maratha Empire
- Tenure: 1681 - 1689
- Predecessor: Soyarabai
- Successor: Tarabai
- Born: Sakvarbai Gaikwad
- Spouse: Shivaji (m. 10 January 1657)
- Issue: Kamalabai
Names
- Sakvarbai Shivajiraje Bhonsale
Regnal name
- Shrimant Akhand Soubhagyavati Sakvarbai Rani Saheb Bhosale
- House: Gaikwad (by birth) Bhonsale (by marriage)
- Father: Nandaji Rao Gaikwad
- Religion: Hinduism

Sakvarbai Bhosale (née Gaikwad) was the fourth wife of Shivaji I, the founder of the Maratha Kingdom. She was a daughter of a Maratha aristocrat, Nandaji Rao Gaikwad.

Sakvarbai Gaikwad married Shivaji I in January 1657, at the time she was his sixth wife. She later gave birth to a daughter named, Kamalabai. Kamalabai later married Janoji Palkar, who belonged from an aristocratic family.

After the death of her husband in 1680, she wanted to commit sati just like her husband's third wife, Putalabai. But was not allowed to do so because she had a daughter.

== Death ==
Sakvarbai died in the captivity of Aurangzeb, after being taken as a prisoner along with royal family members during the escape from Raigad fort when it was captured following the death of Sambhaji I.

== In popular culture ==
=== Films and television ===
- Sharvani Pillai portrayed Sakvarbai in Swarajyarakshak Sambhaji, based on the life of Sambhaji.
