= Sonali Khare =

Indian actress (born 1978)

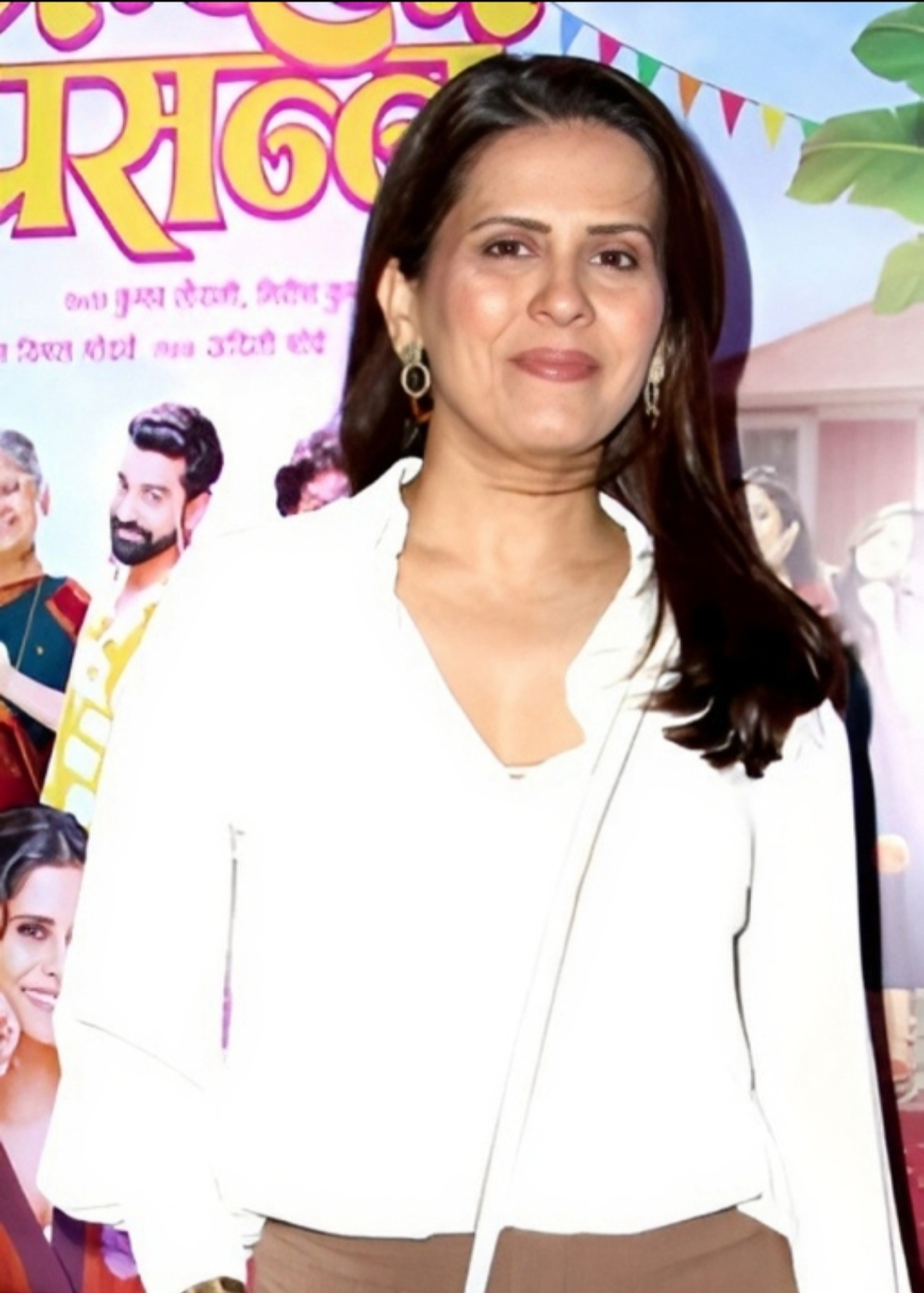
- Khare in 2024
- Born: 5 December 1978 (age 47); Dombivli, Maharashtra, India
- Occupation: Actress
- Years active: 2000–present
- Spouse: Bijay Anand (m. 2007)
- Children: Sanaya Anand
- Relatives: Madhavi Nimkar (cousin brother); Tushar Deval (cousin brother); Swati Deval (sister-in-law)

Sonali Khare (pronounced [sɔːnaːliː kʰəɾeː]; born 5 December 1978) is an Indian actress and producer who works primarily in Marathi films and television. She began her acting career with the Marathi television series Aabhalmaya in 2000 and subsequently established herself through appearances in films such as Savarkhed Ek Gaon, Ranragini, Checkmate, Hrudayantar and Well Done Baby. She has also appeared in Hindi television series including Pyaar Ke Do Naam: Ek Raadha, Ek Shyaam and Na Umra Ki Seema Ho, as well as the Hindi-Telugu film Adipurush.

In 2022, Khare ventured into film production by launching Blooming Lotus Productions, under which she produced and starred in the Marathi film MyLek (2024), alongside her daughter Sanaya Anand.

== Early life ==
Khare was born on 5 December 1978 in Dombivli, Maharashtra. Her maternal uncle is the harmonium player Govindrao Patwardhan, while her mother, Kalpita Khare is a trained classical singer. She attended S. V. Joshi High School and later studied at V. G. Vaze College and Somaiya College, where she completed a degree in psychology. Actress Madhavi Nimkar is her maternal cousin, and musician Tushar Deval is her maternal cousin; Deval is married to actress Swati Deval.

== Career ==
=== 2000–2008: Early work and recognition ===
Khare began her acting career in 2000 with the Marathi television series Aabhalmaya, in which she portrayed Reshma Kapadiya. She subsequently appeared in the Hindi film Tere Liye (2001), marking her film debut. In 2003, she made her Marathi film debut with Resham Ghaat, alongside Reema Lagoo, Arun Nalawade and Shreyas Talpade. The following year, she played the lead in Rajiv Patil's crime thriller Savarkhed Ek Gaon opposite Ankush Chaudhari, followed by the crime drama Ranragini, in which she portrayed a fearless woman seeking revenge for her sister's murder. During this period, she also appeared in the Hindi television series Rooh and the Marathi television series Avantika, Oon Paus and Bedhund Manachya Lahari, all of which were well received.

In 2006, Khare portrayed Kaveri Sharma, the protagonist's sister, in Rajshri Productions' television series Pyaar Ke Do Naam: Ek Raadha, Ek Shyaam, which ran for over 100 episodes and brought her wider recognition on Hindi television. Next, she played the female lead in Sanjay Jadhav's thriller Checkmate, alongside Ankush Chaudhari, Swapnil Joshi, Rahul Mehendale and Sanjay Narvekar, which follows a group of friends who take on a scam syndicate after losing their money and become embroiled in a dangerous struggle to save one of their own. It went on to become a commercial and critical success and was particularly noted for its style and chess-inspired cat-and-mouse plot.

=== 2013–2017: Return to Marathi films and television ===
After a period of relatively limited screen appearances, she returned to television in 2014 with the Star Pravah series Be Dune Daha, in which she played a leading role opposite Sunil Barve in the family drama.

In 2016, Khare appeared in the suspense thriller 7, Roshan Villa, portraying one of the leads in a love triangle, and also starred in the comedy-drama & Jara Hatke. In 2017, she featured in designer Vikram Phadnis' directorial debut Hrudayantar, an emotional drama exploring marital conflict and the importance of family and relationships. The film was positively received by critics, with Devesh Sharma of Filmfare describing Khare's performance as "effective". She hosted the Colors Marathi cooking show Aaj Kay Special in 2020.

=== 2021–present: Digital appearances and production debut ===
In 2021, Khare had a brief role as a doctor in the marital drama film Well Done Baby, which was released directly on Amazon Prime Video. The same year, she appeared in the ALT Balaji series Crashh and the Planet Marathi OTT series Anuradha. She later portrayed Kaikeyi, the queen of Ayodhya and stepmother of Rama, in the Hindi-Telugu mythological film Adipurush (2023), directed by Om Raut. The film was critically and commercially panned. SShe also returned to Hindi television after several years with Na Umra Ki Seema Ho, in which she portrayed Yamini Roy, Dev's former college friend who is wrongly believed to have had a daughter with him.

In 2022, Khare launched her production house, Blooming Lotus Productions, and produced MyLek (2024), directed by Priyanka Tanwar. The film starred Khare as a single mother navigating her relationship with her teenage daughter, played by her real-life daughter Sanaya Anand in her acting debut. Kalpeshraj Kubal of Maharashtra Times praised Khare's performance, noting her screen presence and emotional scenes. Her performance earned her a nomination for the Filmfare Award Marathi for Best Actress.

After nearly a decade, Khare returned to Marathi television with Kothare Vision's family drama Nashibvan, in which she portrayed an antagonist for the first time, alongside Adinath Kothare, Ajay Purkar and Neha Naik.

== Personal life ==
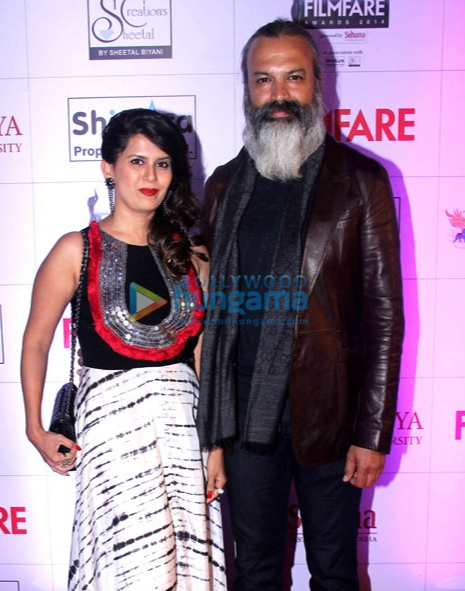
Khare and her husband in 2014.

Khare met actor Bijay Anand on the sets of the horror television series Raat Hone Ko Hai. Their friendship developed into a relationship, and the couple lived together for two years before having a simple court marriage in 2007. The couple have a daughter, Sanaya, who was born in 2006. Over the years, the media reported that there was a 27-year age difference between Khare and Anand; however, in 2024, Khare stated that the age difference between them was eight years.

During the November 2008 Mumbai attacks, Khare and Anand were having dinner at the Taj Mahal Palace Hotel in Mumbai when it was attacked by terrorists. Khare later recalled that they initially believed the incident involved gang violence before realizing it was a terrorist attack, and that her main concern was their infant daughter, who was at home. The couple remained inside the hotel and left safely the following morning.

== Filmography ==
=== Films ===
Year	Title	Role	Notes	Ref.
2000	Tere Liye	Tara	Hindi film	
2003	Resham Gath	Kiran		
2004	Savarkhed Ek Gaon	Priya		
2004	Ranragini	Ragini Birajdar		
2005	Hum Jo Keh Na Paaye	Nona	Hindi film	
2006	Bhulwa	Radhika Shelar		
2008	Checkmate	Sunila		
2013	Navra Maza Bhavra		Special appearance	
2013	Vanshvel	Herself	Special appearance in song "Ambe Krupa Kari"	
2016	7, Roshan Villa	Rati Bakshi		
2016	& Jara Hatke	Nalu		
2017	Hrudayantar	Ashwini		
2018	Ye Re Ye Re Paisa	Film Actress	Special appearance	
2019	Smile Please	Herself	Special appearance in song "Chal Pudhe Chaal Tu"	
2021	Well Done Baby	Dr. Simone		
2023	Adipurush	Kaikeyi	Telugu–Hindi bilingual film	
2024	MyLek	Sharvari	Also Producer; Nominated: Filmfare Award Marathi for Best Actress; Nominated: MaTa Sanman for Best Actress	
2025	Ye Re Ye Re Paisa 3	Herself	Special appearance in song "Udat Gela Sonya"	

=== Television ===
Year	Title	Role	Language	Network	Notes	Ref.
2000	Aabhalmaya	Reshma Kapadia	Marathi	Alpha TV Marathi		
2003-2004	Bedhund Manachya Lahari		Marathi	ETV Marathi		
2004	Rooh		Hindi	Zee TV	Episodic role	
2004-2007	Avantika	Nidhi Patekar	Marathi	Alpha TV Marathi		
2005	Raat Hone Ko Hai		Hindi	Sahara One	Episodic role	
2005	Oon Paus	Savita	Marathi	Zee Marathi		
2006	Pyaar Ke Do Naam: Ek Raadha, Ek Shyaam	Kaveri Sharma	Hindi	StarPlus		
2011	Dholkichya Talavar	Contestant	Marathi	Colors Marathi	Season 1	
2014	Be Dune Daha	Vibhavari Bapat	Marathi	Star Pravah		
2020	Aaj Kay Special	Host	Marathi	Colors Marathi		
2023	Na Umra Ki Seema Ho	Yamini Roy	Hindi	Star Bharat		
2025–2026	Nashibvan	Urvashi	Marathi	Star Pravah		

=== Web series ===
Year	Title	Role	Language	Network	Notes	Ref.
2021	Crashh	Devyani Kapoor	Hindi	ALT Balaji		
2021	Anuradha	Adv. Nisha Kotwal	Marathi	Planet Marathi OTT		
