= Sanjay Surkar =

Marathi film director (1959–2012)

- Born: 19 August 1959; Deoli, Bombay State, India
- Died: 27 September 2012 (aged 53); Pune, Maharashtra, India
- Occupation: director

Sanjay Surkar (19 August 1959 – 27 September 2012) was a Marathi film director. He won three National Film Awards for the films Rao Saheb (1996), Tu Tithe Mee (1998) and Gharabaher (1999) in Best Feature Film in Marathi category. Along with films, Surkar had also worked in television and theatre.

== Early life ==
Surkar was born on 19 August 1959 at Deoli in Wardha district of Maharashtra state. He earned his Bachelor of Commerce degree from G. S. Commerce College in 1983. From the Nagpur University he took his bachelor's degree and Masters in Fine Arts specialising in Dramatics.

== Career ==
=== Early works in theatre ===
Surkar entered into entertainment industry from the theatre medium. Brought up in Nagpur, he worked with numerous plays doing back stage works as well as acting in his school and college days. In Nagpur, he worked on many plays for children. While still doing his Bachelor in Fine Arts from Nagpur University, Surkar along with actor Girish Oak and Pramod Bhusari conducted various workshops. Surkar then moved to Mumbai and continued his theatre work with commercial plays like Chafa Bolena, Preetisangam and Tu Fakta Ho Mhan. His plays like Vansh, Bonsai, No Exit, The Wall, etc. made to various state level competitions. He was first introduced to television through the serial No Problem, where he received his first chance to work with film medium. He got an opportunity to assist director Kanchan Nayak in the 1989 Marathi film Kalat Nakat. Produced by Smita Talwalkar, the film handled the delicate topic of extra-marital affair, its effects on families and children. The film ended with the positive message of keeping the family-ties together and won the National Film Award in the Best Marathi film category. The film also marked the beginning of Surkar-Talwalkar team which would create many films and television shows in future.

=== Chaukat Raja and critical acclaim ===
In 1991, Surkar directed his first independent feature film Chaukat Raja that was produced by Smita Talwalkar under her banner "Asmita Chitra". This family drama was a journey of a mentally challenged boy Nandu. While playing on swings in childhood along with his friend Minal, Nandu hurts his head and is disabled. Nandu grows up into a man, played by Dilip Prabhavalkar, but still considers himself a child. Sulabha Deshpande played the role of his mother and elder Minal's role was played by Talwalkar. Prabhavalkar received Best Actor award granted by the Government of Maharashtra and with critical acclaims to the film, Surkar was noticed as a director.

In 1993 when Talwalkar produced her first directorial venture Sawat Mazhi Ladki, Surkar assisted her in direction. The comedy drama plot showed a 40 plus married doctor, played by Mohan Joshi, falling for his 20 something assistant doctor. The assistant doctor's role was played by Varsha Usgaonkar and Neena Kulkarni portrayed the role of doctor's housewife. His next project Aaplee Maanse (1993) was a family drama film with an ensemble cast of many notable actors of the Marathi film industry that included Prashant Damle, Mohan Joshi, Sudhir Joshi, Sachin Khedekar, Reema Lagoo, Dilip Prabhavalkar, Ashok Saraf and Renuka Shahane. In 1994 he directed Yadna which received seven awards at the Maharashtra State Film Award.

In the following years, Surkar directed three notable films of his career. Rao Saheb (1996), Tu Tithe Mee (1998) and Gharabaher (1999) won him National Film Awards as director of Best Marathi feature films. Rao Saheb was a story of local politics in Maharashtra. Tu Tithe Mee was a story of an old couple, played by Mohan Joshi and Suhas Joshi, coping with their next-gen family and was produced by Talwalkar. The film was later adopted in Hindi as Baghban (2003). The 1999 film Gharabaher dealt with the topic of hypocrisy towards women and problems in their empowerment. For giving the "wonderfully controlled performance" of a corrupt politician in the film, Mohan Joshi was presented with a Special Jury Award at the 47th National Film Awards. Mrinal Kulkarni also received Maharashtra State Film Award for Best Actress for her role in this film.

=== Continuing direction ===
In 2004, the Surkar-Talwalkar team brought to viewers Saatchya Aat Gharat, a film that questioned western culture's influence on teenagers. Surkar also went on to direct films on various social issues. His 2009 film Sukhant was a struggle story of an old woman who meets a car accident which puts her in tetraplegia. To end her life with dignity and save troubles of her family, she pleads for euthanasia. Jyoti Chandekar played the lead role in the film, while Atul Kulkarni and Kavita Lad played supporting leads. In 2011, Surkar debuted in Bollywood with the film Stand By. With lead roles played by Siddharth Kher and Adinath Kothare, the plot was about the internal politics in football. The film did not do well at the box-office.

Apart from films, Surkar continued his work through television serials, both in Marathi and Hindi. In Marathi he directed shows like Noopur, Sukanya and Un Paus. The show Avantika with Mrinal Kulkarni playing the title lead role, won numerous awards for her and made her a household name. In 2009, he directed the Hindi television show Aapki Antara which is about a 5-year-old girl Antara who has autism. In 2010 he went on to produce the TV show Dhoondh Legi Manzil Humein, which was loosely based on his film Gharabaher.

== Death ==
He died on 27 September 2012 of a sudden heart attack while on the sets of his upcoming film Laathi. The film was the debut for actress Padmini Kolhapure as a producer and was later directed by Mahesh Aney. He was also working on the script of an upcoming film to be directed by Nitin Chandrakant Desai on the life of Indian freedom fighter Lokmanya Tilak.

== Selected filmography ==
=== Films ===
Year	Title	Notes
1989	Kalat Nakalat	As assistant director
1991	Chaukat Raja	First feature film Maharashtra State Film Award for Best Film
1993	Savat Mazi Ladki	As assistant director
1993	Aaplee Maanse	Maharashtra State Film Award for Best Second Film
1994	Yadna	
1996	Rao Saheb	National Film Award for Best Marathi Feature Film
1998	Tu Tithe Mee	National Film Award for Best Marathi Feature Film
1999	Gharabaher	National Film Award for Best Marathi Feature Film
2004	Saatchya Aat Gharat	
2006	Aai Shappath..!	
2006	Anandache Jhaad	
2007	Sakhi	
2007	Aawahan	
2008	Ek Daav Sansaracha	
2008	Tandala	
2009	Master Eke Master	
2010	Ranbhool	
2009	Sukhant	
2011	Stand By	Hindi film
	Laathi	Posthumous release, later directed by Mahesh Aney

=== Television ===
Year	Title	Production house	Channel
	Eka Haatachi Taali		
	Raoo		
	Noopur		
	Akashdeep		Hindi serial
1998	Sukanya		
1998	Avantika	Asmita Chitra	Zee Marathi
1998	Un Paus	Asmita Chitra	
2009–2010	Aapki Antara		Zee TV
2010–2011	Dhoondh Legi Manzil Humein		STAR One; As Producer

=== Theatre ===
Title	Notes
To Ek Kshan	

== Awards ==
National Film Awards

- 44th National Film Awards for 1996 – Rao Saheb – As director in Best Feature Film in Marathi category

Shared with producers K. B. Joshi and Ravindra Surve

Citation: For depicting the struggle for power of ambitious politicians in a most effective manner.

- 46th National Film Awards for 1998 – Tu Tithe Mee – As director in Best Feature Film in Marathi category

Shared with producer Smita Talwalkar

Citation: For shedding light on the plight of the old and the ageing and the crumbling of the joint family system in a novel and entertaining format of a love story. Beautiful performance by Mohan Joshi and Suhas Joshi are the highlights of the film.

- 47th National Film Awards for 1999 – Gharabaher – As director in Best Feature Film in Marathi category

Shared with producers Ratan Madan and Narendra Shinde

Citation: For depicting the hypocrisy exercised by man in complete contradiction of declared socio-political positions and a total reversal of behaviour when it comes to power and lust. It draws attention to the inherent problems in the empowerment of women.

Other awards

- 1992 – Maharashtra State Film Award for Best Film to Aaplee Maanse
