= Avantika (TV series) =

2002 Indian Marathi language TV series

- Genre: Drama
- Created by: Asmita Production
- Written by: Rohini Ninawe
- Directed by: Sanjay Surkar
- Starring: See below
- Country of origin: India
- Original language: Marathi
- No. of episodes: 738

Production
- Producer: Smita Talwalkar
- Camera setup: Multi-camera
- Running time: 22 minutes

Original release
- Network: Alpha TV Marathi
- Release: 3 June 2002 – 25 March 2005

Avantika is an Indian Marathi language television series which aired on Alpha TV Marathi. The series premiered on 3 June 2002 and ended on 25 March 2005 after completing 738 episodes by replacing Aabhalmaya. The show starred Mrinal Kulkarni in lead role. It was produced by Smita Talwalkar under the banner of Asmita Production.

== Plot ==
Avantika is a touching story about a woman named Avantika who dreams of a happy marriage and a successful career as an architect. She marries Saurabh, a successful businessman, and they have two kids. But Avantika's dreams are shattered when she discovers that Saurabh is having an affair with Maithali, who is close to their family. Surprisingly, Saurabh's family knew about it but didn't tell Avantika.

Feeling hurt and betrayed, Avantika decides to leave Saurabh. She finds support and a new start by marrying her boss, Shashank, who is divorced and has a daughter named Jui. The story is all about the ups and downs of relationships, heartbreak, and Avantika's journey to find happiness again.

== Cast ==
- Mrinal Kulkarni as Avantika Jahagirdar (née Dixit)
- Sandeep Kulkarni as Saurabh Jahagirdar
- Girish Oak as Aravind Dixit
- Ravindra Mankani as Shashank Nerurkar
- Subodh Bhave as Salil Dixit
- Sharvani Pillai as Sanika Patil (née Dixit)
- Sunil Barve as Anish Patekar
- Suchitra Bandekar as Urmila Pradhan (née Karnik)
- Sarika Nilatkar-Nawathe as Maithili
- Deepa Lagoo as Shobhana Jahagirdar
- Vandana Sardesai-Waknis as Anita Deshmukh (née Patil)
- Rahul Mehendale as Shailesh
- Parth Ketkar as Tejas
- Prajakta Kulkarni-Dighe as Sonalika
- Smita Talwalkar as Sulabha Dixit
- Shreyas Talpade as Abhishek Jahagirdar
- Sulekha Talwalkar as Ashwini Jahagirdar (née Dalal)
- Aadesh Bandekar as Milind Pradhan
- Pushkar Shrotri as Avinash Patil
- Sonali Khare as Nidhi Patekar (née Ahuja)
- Tushar Dalvi as Dr.Nikhil Rajadhyaksha
- Manoj Joshi
- Pournima Talwalkar as Reema Salil Dixit (née Sathe)
- Ajay Wadhavkar

== Awards ==
Aapla Alpha Awards
Category	Recipient	Role
Best Child Actor	Anuja Borkar	Jui Nerurkar
Best Supporting Male	Subodh Bhave	Salil Dixit
Best Actress	Mrinal Kulkarni	Avantika Dixit
