= Sharvani Pillai =

Indian actress

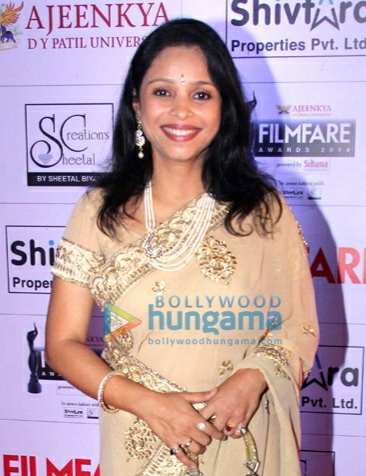
- Pillai in 2014
- Born: 25 June 1973 (age 53); Mumbai, Maharashtra
- Occupation: Actress
- Years active: 1998-present
- Spouse: Unni Pillai

Sharvani Pillai is an Indian Maharashtrian actress, well known for her role in the Marathi serial Avantika as Sanika and in the year 1998 film Tu Tithe Mee. She is originally from Maharashtra, India and has also played roles in regional Marathi daily soaps and other Bollywood movies.

== Career ==
Sharvani has been a part of many televisions soap in the earlier part of her career. Most of the characters she has played so far have been girl next door roles. With roles in Damini, Avantika, Tujha Ni Majha Ghar Shrimantacha and Ambat Goad, she became a regular on the television screen. She played the second lead in Avantika. She has also worked in Duniya, a Hindi sitcom. She is currently appeared in Mulgi Zali Ho as a lead. She played Sakvarbai in marathi drama Swarajyarakshak Sambhaji.

Sharvani gained stardom due to her role in Tu Tithe Mee. She played the role of the daughter in law of the main protagonist, played by veteran Marathi actor, Mohan Joshi. She also worked in marathi film "Nishani Dawa Angtha".

Sharvani played a character in Atithi Tum Kab Jaoge starring Paresh Rawal and Ajay Devgn.

She also plays a lead role in Marathi Stage drama Makadachya Haati Champagne and Alibaba ani Chalishitale Chor.

== Filmography ==
=== Films ===
Year	Title	Role	Director
1998	Tu Tithe Mee	Nanasaheb's Daughter	Sanjay Surkar
2008	Jogwa	Parvya	Rajiv Patil
2009	Patla Tar Ghya	Kishori Shreyas Oak	Amol Bhave
2009	Nishani Dava Angatha	Special appearance	Purshottam Berde
2010	Pangira	Sumitra's Friend	Rajiv Patil
2011	Deool	Ninety's wife	Umesh Kulkarni
2010	Atithi Tum Kab Jaoge? (Hindi film)	Mrs. Godbole	Ashwni Dhir
2015	A Paying Ghost	Gamini	Sushrut Bhagwat
2018	Asehi Ekada Vhave	Revati Vaidya	Sushrut Bhagwat
2024	8 Don 75	Vatsala	Sushrut Bhagwat

=== Television ===
Year	Title	Role	Channel
2001-2003	Avantika	Sanika Patil	Alpha TV Marathi
2012	Tu Tithe Me	Ankita Sarnaik	Zee Marathi
2012-2014	Ambat Goad	Indumati	Star Pravah
2015	Yek Number	Savitri Deshmukh	Star Pravah
2017	Khulta Kali Khulena	Geeta Dalvi	Zee Marathi
2018	Grahan	Rama Poddar	Zee Marathi
2018-2020	Swarajyarakshak Sambhaji	Queen Sakvarbai	Zee Marathi
2020-2022	Mulgi Zali Ho	Uma Patil	Star Pravah
2022	Muramba	Mai	Star Pravah
2022	Saavi Ki Savaari	Nutan	Colors TV
2023	Khumasdar Natyancha Goda Masala	Pallavi Sadavarte	Sony Marathi
2026	Visaru Nako Tu Mala	Nalini	Star Pravah
