= MyLek =

2024 Marathi film directed by Priyanka Tanwar

- Theatrical release poster
- Directed by: Priyanka Tanwar
- Written by: Emeara
- Produced by: Kalpita Khare; Bijay Anand
- Starring: Sonali Khare; Sanayaah Anand; Umesh Kamat
- Cinematography: Mridul Sen
- Edited by: Prachi Rohidas
- Music by: Pankaj Padghan
- Production company: Blooming Lotus Productions
- Release date: 19 April 2024
- Country: India
- Language: Marathi

MyLek (transl. Mother-Daughter) is a 2024 Marathi-language drama film directed by Priyanka Tanwar and produced by Kalpita Khare and Bijay Anand under Blooming Lotus Productions. The film stars Sonali Khare and her daughter Sanayaah Anand in the titular role, along with Umesh Kamat, Bijay Anand, and Sanjay Mone in pivotal roles. The film showed the tale of a young, single mother who is navigating a loving but complex bond with her spirited and ambitious teenage daughter as she enters puberty while also attempting to strike a balance between her personal and professional lives.

== Plot ==
Sharvari Dixit, a divorced single parent originally from India, resides in London with her thirteen-year-old daughter, Myra. She is an ambitious and hardworking head chef at a British restaurant who wants to start her own Maharashtrian restaurant in the UK. However, she is unable to arrange funds. Myra, like her mother, is industrious. At the same time, Myra is also battling endometriosis, but Sharvari is keen to make Myra an athlete. Slowly but surely, Myra disobeys her mother, weakening their relationship. As if that were not bad enough, Sharvari loses her job. Enter Vaibhav, a school friend of Sharvari, who used to love her but was scared to propose to her. Vaibhav is single because his bride-to-be had eloped with someone else on the day of his marriage. Vaibhav gets along well with Sharvari and Myra. The only silver lining is that Vaibhav and Sharvari have decided to marry each other. But on the day of their engagement, Myra's athletics competition takes place. Without even informing Sharvari, Myra leaves to participate in the competition.

== Cast ==
- Sonali Khare as Sharvari Dixit
- Sanayaah Anand as Myra Dixit
- Umesh Kamat as Vaibhav
- Bijay Anand as Mr. Bhasin
- Sanjay Mone as Ajoba
- Shubhangi Latkar as Ajji
- Mahesh Patwardhan as Restaurant owner
- Vansh Agarwal
- Zach Colton as Mikey
- Sophie Booth as Emma

== Production ==
It is the first film of Sonali Khare's own production house named, "Blooming Lotus Productions." The film was announced on the occasion of Mother's Day 2022 with a graphical motion poster. Sonali Khare and Sanayaah Anand, in real life, are mother and daughter, respectively, and in MyLek, they played the same roles; it also marks the latter's debut in films. The film has the maximum number of women associated with different departments of filmmaking. The principal photography started in August 2022 in London and wrapped in September 2022.

== Soundtrack ==
The music for the movie is composed by Pankajj Padghan.

Track list
No.	Title	Lyrics	Singer(s)	Length
1.	"Asatana Tu"	Kshitij Patwardhan	Savni Bhatt	2:55
2.	"June Diwas"	Kshitij Patwardhan	Neha Adarsh Shinde	2:13
3.	"Nastana Tu"	Kshitij Patwardhan	Aarya Ambekar	3:03
Total length:				8:11

== Release and reception ==
The official poster for the film was unveiled on 21 February 2024, along with the announcement of the release date. On 5 April 2024, a grand launch ceremony for the trailer was held, with attendance from several industry celebrities such as Harshada Khanvilkar, Sanjay Jadhav, and Amruta Khanvilkar.

=== Critical response ===
Kalpeshraj Kubal, a critic from The Times of India, awarded the film 3 out of 5 stars, describing the story as "relatable and timely," and wrote, "Priyanka and her team handle the emotional side of the story extremely well and give viewers a lot of things to think about." The critic based at Maharashtra Times commended the lead actors, writing, "Khare has appeared on screen in a long role, her demeanor on screen is pleasing, and she has presented the emotional scenes very well, while Sanaya Anand has done a remarkable job," also giving it 3 out of 5 stars. Additionally, a reviewer from Film Information noted, "The portion showing the bonding between the outspoken and street-smart daughter and her mother is good. But the drama becomes predictable once cracks develop in their relationship."

=== Accolades ===
Year	Award	Category	Nominee (s)	Result	Ref.
2025	MaTa Sanman	Best Actress	Sonali Khare	Nominated	
2025	MaTa Sanman	Best Supporting Actor	Umesh Kamat	Nominated	
2025	Filmfare Awards Marathi	Best Actress	Sonali Khare	Nominated	
