= Mala Sasu Havi =

Marathi-language TV series

- Genre: Drama
- Directed by: Ajay Mayekar
- Starring: See below
- Theme music composer: Nilesh Moharir
- Opening theme: Priyanka Barve
- Country of origin: India
- Original language: Marathi
- No. of episodes: 401

Production
- Producers: Jitendra Gupta; Mahesh Tagade
- Camera setup: Multi-camera
- Running time: 22 minutes
- Production company: Tell-a-Tale Media

Original release
- Network: Zee Marathi
- Release: 27 August 2012 – 23 November 2013

Mala Sasu Havi (transl. I want Mother-in-law) is an Indian Marathi-language television series which aired on Zee Marathi. It starred Dipti Devi and Asawari Joshi in lead roles. The show premiered from 27 August 2012 by replacing Eka Lagnachi Dusri Goshta.

== Cast ==
=== Main ===
- Asawari Joshi / Savita Prabhune as Gayatri Deshmane / Gayatri Vinayak Ratnaparkhi
- Dipti Devi as Meera Rushikesh Ratnaparkhi

=== Recurring ===
- Sankarshan Karhade as Rushikesh Vinayak Ratnaparkhi (Rishi)
- Anand Abhyankar / Rajan Bhise as Vinayak Ratnaparkhi (Aaba)
- Sachin Deshpande as Prathamesh Vinayak Ratnaparkhi
- Dipti Ketkar as Abhilasha Prathamesh Ratnaparkhi
- Akshay Pendse / Ashish Kulkarni as Vighnesh Vinayak Ratnaparkhi
- Pradnya Jadhav as Kashmira Vighnesh Ratnaparkhi (Cash)
- Avinash Narkar as Meera's father
- Surekha Kudachi as Abhilasha's mother
- Sameer Khandekar as Abhilasha's brother

== Awards ==
Zee Marathi Utsav Natyancha Awards
Year	Category	Recipient	Role
2012	Best Mother-in-law	Asawari Joshi	Gayatri Deshmane
2013	Best Supporting Character Female	Dipti Ketkar	Abhilasha Ratnaparkhi
