= Well Done Baby =

2021 Indian film

- Official release poster
- Marathi: वेल डन बेबी
- Directed by: Priyanka Tanwar
- Written by: Marmabandha Gavhane
- Produced by: Anand Pandit; Pushkar Jog; Mohaan Nadaar
- Starring: Pushkar Jog; Amruta Khanvilkar; Vandana Gupte; Sanjay Jadhav
- Cinematography: Santonio Terzio
- Edited by: Mandar Khanvilkar; Sandeep Francis
- Music by: Rohan-Rohan
- Production companies: Anand Pandit Motion Pictures; Goosebumps Entertainment; The Production Headquarters
- Distributed by: Amazon Prime Video
- Release date: 9 April 2021
- Running time: 99 minutes
- Country: India
- Language: Marathi

Well Done Baby (stylized as वेल डन Baby) is a 2021 Indian Marathi-language drama film directed by Priyanka Tanwar and produced under Anand Pandit Motion Pictures, Goosebumps Entertainment and The Production Headquarters. The film stars Pushkar Jog, Amruta Khanvilkar, Vandana Gupte and Sanjay Jadhav. Music by Rohan-Rohan.

Well Done Baby was originally scheduled for a theatrical release on 12 June 2020, but the release was postponed due to the COVID-19 pandemic. The film was released on OTT Amazon Prime Video 9 April 2021 and re-release theatrical on 14 January 2022.

== Synopsis ==
Aditya and Meera, a modern couple, struggle to keep their marriage afloat. However, as they are about to give up on each other, fate gives them a purpose to maintain their togetherness.

== Cast ==
- Pushkar Jog as Aditya
- Amruta Khanvilkar as Meera
- Vandana Gupte as Nirmala
- Sanjay Jadhav as Marriage councillor
- Sonali Khare as Doctor Simone
- Rahul Awasthi as Aditya's Father
- Radhika Ingle as Aditya's Mother
- Neha Shitole as Doctor
- Suan-Li Ong as Joanna
- Ranjna Garg as Mayura
- Vladimir Mladenov Free-Man as Homeless Begger
- Henrietta Szentes as Emma
- Pradeep Shembekhar
- Bhushan Telang
- Archana Malu Tapuria as Archana

== Production ==
The film was announced on 8 October 2019 via a promotional poster, with official confirmation that film actor Pushkar Jog. Principal photography began on 21 October 2019 in London. On 11 November 2019, entire shooting of the film has been wrapped up.

== Soundtrack ==
Well Done Baby

Soundtrack album by Rohan Pradhan
- Released: 2021
- Recorded: 2021
- Genre: Feature film soundtrack
- Length: 3:06
- Language: Marathi

Official audio
- Well Done Baby – Full Album on YouTube

Track listing
No.	Title	Lyrics	Music	Singer(s)	Length
1.	"Aai Baba"	Valay Mulgund	Rohan-Rohan	Rohan Pradhan	3:06
2.	"Halki Halki"	Valay Mulgund	Rohan Rohan	Arpita Chakraborty	3:08
Total length:					6.14

== Critical reception ==
Well Done Baby received negative to mixed reviews from critics. Mihir Bhanage of The Times of India gave the film 2.5 stars out of 5 and wrote "Well Done Baby ultimately ends up being a film that could've been in sync with the young viewers' perception". Shefali Deshpande of The Quint gave the film 1.5 stars out of 5 and wrote "This film fails for many reasons, and it pains me to even say so because the treatment of the subject and characters both makes it clear that the intention was good but the delivery leaves a lot to be desired". Keyur Seta of Cinestaan.com gave the film 2 stars out of 5 and says "Amruta Khanvilkar is adequate but Pushkar Jog, who is credited with the concept for the film, is a disappointment, particularly in the important scene where he has an emotional outburst.". Jaideep Pathaki of Maharashtra Times gave the film 2.5 stars out of 5 and wrote "Of course, there is nothing new about these topics because they come up frequently in the contemporary media. 'Well Done Baby' is definitely worth a watch. However, the fact remains that it does not show anything different".
