= Aai (1995 film) =

- Directed by: Mahesh Manjrekar
- Written by: Mahesh Manjrekar; Abhiram Bhadkamkar
- Produced by: Mahesh Manjrekar
- Starring: Neena Kulkarni; Dilip Kulkarni; Milind Gawali; Sunil Barve; Medha Manjrekar
- Cinematography: Vijay Kumar Arora
- Edited by: V. N. Mayekar
- Music by: Anand Modak
- Production company: Ashwami Films
- Release date: 15 December 1995
- Running time: 131 minutes
- Country: India
- Language: Marathi

Aai is a 1995 Indian Marathi film was directed and produced by Mahesh Manjrekar. It stars Neena Kulkarni in a titular role along with Dilip Kulkarni, Milind Gawali, Sunil Barve, Medha Manjrekar and Sulekha Talwalkar in lead roles. It was released in 15 December 1995. The film marked Manjrekar's directorial debut in Marathi cinema. It had a theatrical run of 50 weeks at Prabhat in Pune and went on to complete a combined 100-week run across Maharashtra.

== Plot ==
Sumitra Pradhan lives with her husband Avinash and their two young sons, Deepak and Kiran. After Avinash suffers a serious accident and loses the use of his legs, Sumitra takes responsibility for supporting the family and bringing up her sons. She makes sacrifices to ensure that Deepak and Kiran can continue their education.

Years later, Deepak and Kiran have grown up. Deepak works at a bank, while Kiran is pursuing engineering studies. With Avinash still requiring treatment and Kiran's education creating financial difficulties, Sumitra asks Deepak to arrange a bank loan to meet the family's needs. The request puts Deepak in a difficult position and creates a conflict that changes the lives of the family members.

== Cast ==
- Neena Kulkarni as Sumitra Pradhan
- Dilip Kulkarni as Avinash Pradhan
- Milind Gawali as Kiran Pradhan
- Sunil Barve as Deepak Pradhan
- Sulekha Talwalkar as Shefali Jadhav-Pradhan
- Medha Manjrekar as Prajakta Pradhan
- Shivaji Satam as Mr. Bawadekar
- Juilee Dehuskar as Lakshmi
- Satya Manjrekar

== Awards ==
Award	Category	Recipient	Result
Maharashtra State Film Awards	Best Actor	Dilip Kulkarni	Won
Filmfare Awards Marathi	Best Film	Mahesh Manjrekar	Won
Filmfare Awards Marathi	Best Director	Mahesh Manjrekar	Won
