= Chaukat Raja =

- Theatrical release poster
- Directed by: Sanjay Surkar
- Written by: Ashok Patole
- Produced by: Smita Talwalkar
- Starring: Dilip Prabhavalkar; Smita Talwalkar; Sulabha Deshpande
- Cinematography: Harish Joshi
- Edited by: Vishwas–Anil
- Music by: Anand Modak
- Production company: Asmita Chitra
- Release date: 1991
- Running time: 112 minutes
- Country: India
- Language: Marathi

Chaukat Raja (transl. The King of Diamonds) is a 1991 Indian Marathi-language family drama film directed by Sanjay Surkar and produced by Smita Talwalkar, starring Dilip Prabhavalkar, Ashok Saraf, Smita Talwalkar and Sulabha Deshpande. The story revolves around the mentally ill Nandu (portrayed by Dilip Prabhavalkar) and his life journey.

Dilip Prabhavalkar received the Maharashtra State Award for Best Actor for his depiction of a youngster with developmental disabilities. Before Prabhavalkar, Bollywood actor Paresh Rawal was offered the role.

Chaukat Raja was a commercial success and is regarded as a classic milestone in Indian cinema.

== Plot ==
Meenal and Rajan Ketkar move to Mumbai with their daughter Rani. Meenal is simple housewife who has grown up in the village and is not used to city life. Durgamaushi is an old woman who delivers milk to the apartment Meenal and Rajan have moved in. Durga Mavshi lives with her adult intellectually disabled son Nandu in a Chawl in front of Meenal's apartment building. During their first few days in the new house, Rani becomes the target of Nandu's mischief. Thinking Rani is in danger, Meenal intervenes and slaps Nandu. Durga Mavshi comes over and drags Nandu home while beating him with a stick. Meenal feels that she has met Durga Mavshi before but she is not able to place her in memory.

When Meenal visits Durga Mavshi's house with Rani to retrieve Rani's lost doll Gana, Durga Mavshi's neighbor, tells her about Nandu's past. Meenal realizes where she has met Durga Mavshi. Through flashback it is revealed that Nandu and Meenal (then Mangala Karve) were neighbors on Pawas, India. They were best friends and cared for each other a lot. Meenal called Nandu her Chaukat Raja (King of Diamonds in English) because of his versatile but uncommon personality. When Nandu is 10 and Meenal is 7, Nandu climbs a mango tree at Meenal's insistence but loses his footing. He has a severe brain injury due to this fall. Soon after, Durga Mavshi and Nandu move to Mumbai for better medical care and Meenal moves to a different village due to the father's job.

Realizing Nandu is her long-lost best friend and feeling responsible for his intellectual disability, Meenal tries to support Nandu. She reveals her identity to Nandu and then to Durga Mavshi. Durga Mavshi discourages Meenal from rekindling any relationship with Nandu since even though Nandu is intellectually a 10-year-old, physically he is in his 30s and society sees him as a man even though he is still a child. Meenal still tries to be friends with Nandu. Rajan doesn't understand the relationship Meenal and Nandu have, he becomes very possessive and tries to distance Meenal from Nandu.

Thinking that if he is older, Meenal might feel more comfortable with being friends with him, Nandu observes older people around him and imitates some romantic behavior he has seen. Scared, Meenal seeks help from Director (Reema Lagoo) of a school for intellectually disabled kids. Rana and Meenal convince Durga Mavshi that the school is the best option for Nandu and he will be able to show improvements with support from the school. It takes Nandu a while to settle in his new environment but he is able to make friends and learn new skills.

During a talent show, Nandu performs a song on stage. He notices Meenal in the audience but gets spooked when Meenal has to leave in the middle of his performance. Nandu runs away from the school. On hearing this news, Durva Mavshi goes into shock and passes away soon after. Police find Nandu near a brothel and bring him back to the Chawl. Nandu is unable to perform last rites for his mother as he does not understand that she is dead. He runs to the only other person he finds comfortable - Meenal. Meenal is shocked to hear about Durva Mavshi's death, but Rajan doesn't want to see Nandu in his house and he kicks Nandu out. Rajan's lack of empathy saddens Meenal even further. Understanding his mistake, Rajan follows Nandu to the Chawl, to find him curled up in bed, helpless, crying his eyes out.

In the aftermath, Rajan and Meenal adopt Nandu. Nandu, with support from the school, becomes an internationally renowned artist.

== Cast ==
- Dilip Prabhavalkar as Nandu (a disabled boy)
- Smita Talwalkar as Madhavi Ketkar
- Sulabha Deshpande as Durga Maushi (Nandu's mother)
- Dilip Kulkarni as Rajan Ketkar
- Ashok Saraf as Ganpat (Gana)
- Gauri Kendre as Gana's wife
- Nayana Apte as Gynaecologist
- Nirmiti Sawant as Mrs. Sawant
- Rajasi Behere as Rani
- Reema Lagoo as Director of school

== Reception ==
In a positive review Medium described overall film as "A joy for audiences who denounce melodrama for realistic acting."

== Awards ==
- 1992 – Maharashtra State Film Award for Best Actor – Dilip Prabhavalkar – for his portrayal of a disabled boy
- 1992 – Maharashtra State Film award for Best playback singer female for song "Ek Jhoka"

== Soundtrack ==
The music is composed by Anand Modak and songs were penned by Sudhir Moghe.

Song	Singer (s)	Length
"Ek Jhoka Chuke Kaaljacha Thoka"	Asha Bhosle	4:41
"He Jeevan Sundar Aahe"	Asha Bhosle, Ravindra Sathe, Anjali Marathe	4:21
"Mi Asa Kasa Vegla Vegla"	Ashok Saraf, Dilip Prabhavalkar	4:42
