= Smita Talwalkar =

Indian film producer, actress and director

- Born: Smita Govilkar; 5 September 1954
- Died: 6 August 2014 (aged 59); Mumbai, India
- Occupations: Actress, producer, director
- Spouse: Avinash Talwalkar (m. 1973)
- Relatives: Sulekha Talwalkar (daughter-in-law)

Smita Talwalkar (5 September 1954 – 6 August 2014) was an Indian actress, producer and director in Marathi cinema. She won two National Film Awards as producer of the films Kalat Nakalat (1989) and Tu Tithe Mee (1998).

== Career ==
Born as Smita Govilkar on 5 September 1954, Talwalkar was a television newsreader for 17 years before entering acting. Her initial successful films as an actress include Tu Saubhagyavati Ho and Gadbad Ghotala, both of 1986. Gadbad Ghotala was a comedy romance film with ensemble caste of various notable actors. She stepped into the role of a film producer with her first film Kalat Nakalat under the banner of Asmita Chitra in 1989. The drama dealt with delicate topic of families and children where one of the parents is involved in the extra-marital affair. Directed by Kanchan Nayak, the film was adjudged as the Best Marathi Feature Film at the 37th National Film Awards.

In 1991, Talwalkar played the role of Minal, a childhood friend of a mentally challenged boy in Chaukat Raja. The lead role of the boy was played by Dilip Prabhavalkar, for which he won Maharashtra State Film Award for Best Actor. Directed by Sanjay Surkar, the film was also produced by Talwalkar. Surkar-Talwalkar pair would create many notable films in future like Tu Tithe Mee (1998), Saatchya Aat Gharat (2004) and Anandache Jhaad (2006). After her role as a producer, Talwalkar made her directorial debut in 1993 with the comedy-drama film Sawat Mazhi Ladki. The film received the Maharashtra State Film Award.

The Surkar-Talwalkar pair reprised their roles of director and producer respectively in their next ventures of Tu Tithe Mee and Saatchya Aat Gharat. Tu Tithe Mee was a story of troubles that an aged couple faced in a joint family where the lead roles were played by Mohan Joshi and Suhas Joshi. The film won Talwalkar her second National Film Award. Saatchya Aat Gharat was based partly on a 2002 incident in the University of Pune campus where a girl student was raped by a phony policeman. The film also criticized the Western cultures of pubs, body piercings, Valentine's Day, etc. Apart from producing films, Talwalkar continued her acting in various cameo and supporting roles in several films and televisions.

Under Asmita Chitra banner, Talwalkar produced about 6 films and 25 television serials. The production house also had a joint venture with Zee Network for producing three films. Her notable television series include Peshwai, Avantika, Suvasini, Unch Majha Zoka, etc. Featuring Mrinal Kulkarni in the title role, Avantika that aired on Alpha Marathi was a family drama. Peshwai was a historical story based on the Peshwas of Maharashtra. The show had Neena Kulkarni playing the role of Tara Rani. Unch Majha Zoka was based on the life of social activist Ramabai Ranade.

She appeared in Katha Ek Aanandichi and Ardhangini, which also dealt with social issues. The TV show Suvasini that airs on Star Pravah won the Best Serial award at the 2012 Ma-Ta Sanmaan. The banner has also produced a 30-minute documentary for Brihanmumbai Municipal Corporation that featured Sachin Tendulkar on the topic of cleanliness.

Talwalkar also runs an acting school named "Asmita Chitra Academy". The academy is located at various locations in Pune, Mumbai and Thane and trains around 300 to 350 students in various fields of media. Talwalkar also worked in theatre as an actress and producer. She was on the juries of various stage events, both local and international. She was the president of the Marathi cinema festival organised by Natya Chitra Kala Academy.

== Personal life ==
Talwalkar married at the age of 17. Her son, Amber Talwalkar, is one of the directors of Talwalkars, a major chain of health club in India. Amber is married to actress Sulekha Talwalkar. She also has a daughter, Arti Talwalkar Moye. Smita's other daughter-in-law is television actress Purnima Talwalkar, formally known as Purnima Bhave.

== Death ==
In 2010 Smita Talwalkar was diagnosed with ovarian cancer and was treated with chemotherapy. She died on 6 August 2014 at Jaslok Hospital, Mumbai, at age 59.

== Selected filmography ==
=== Films ===
Year	Title	Credited as			Notes
Year	Title	Actress	Producer	Director	Notes
1986	Dhakti Sun	Yes			
1986	Tu Saubhagyavati Ho	Yes			
1986	Gadbad Ghotala	Yes			
1989	Suryaa: An Awakening (Hindi Movie)	Yes			Gangadhar Choudhary Wife (Special Appearance)
1989	Kalat Nakalat		Yes		
1991	Chaukat Raja	Yes	Yes		Role: Minal
1993	Savat Mazi Ladki		Yes	Yes	
1993	Shivrayachi Soon Tararani	Yes			Role: Yesubai
1998	Tu Tithe Mee		Yes		
2004	Saatchya Aat Gharat		Yes		
2006	Anandache Jhaad		Yes		
2008	Checkmate	Yes			
2009	Lagli Paij	Yes			Role: Anjana
2010	Topi Ghala Re	Yes			
2011	Adgula Madgula	Yes			
2011	Ek Hoti Wadi	Yes			
2011	Janma	Yes			Role: Gynecologist
2012	Shyamche Vadil	Yes			Cameo role
2012	Ya Gol Gol Dabyatla	Yes			
2013	Prem Mhanje Prem Mhanje Prem Asta	Yes			
2014	Bhatukali	Yes			

=== Television ===
Year	Title	Credited as	Channel
1995	Padosan		DD Metro
	Gharkul	Producer	DD Sahyadri
1999	Peshwai	Producer	Alpha TV Marathi
2001	Shriyut Gangadhar Tipre	Meenakshi	Alpha TV Marathi
2002-2005	Avantika	Producer	Alpha TV Marathi
2005-2006	Oon Paus	Producer	Zee Marathi
2009	Katha Eka Anandichi	Producer	Star Pravah
2009	Ardhangini	Producer	Star Pravah
2011	Suvasini	Producer	Star Pravah
2011–2012	Unch Majha Zoka	Producer	Zee Marathi

=== Theatre ===
Title	Role	Notes
Govind Ghya Kuni Gopal Ghya	Janabai	

== Awards ==
National Film Awards

- 37th National Film Awards for 1989 - Kalat Nakalat - As producer in Best Feature Film in Marathi category

Shared with director Kanchan Nayak

Citation: For its delicate description of the tension of love in various facets; wife, mistress and children; and the resolution of tensions in favour of keeping a family together.

- 46th National Film Awards for 1998 - Tu Tithe Mee - As producer in Best Feature Film in Marathi category

Shared with director Sanjay Surkar

Citation: For shedding light on the plight of the old and the ageing and the crumbling of the joint family system in a novel and entertaining format of a love story. Beautiful performance by Mohan Joshi and Suhas Joshi are the highlights of the film.

Other Awards

- 1992 - Maharashtra State Film Awards - Second Best Feature Film for Sawat Mazhi Ladki
- 1999 - Ga Di Ma Award of Maharashtra Kamgar Sahitya Parishad for the film Tu Tithe Mee
- 2010-11 - V. Shantaram Special Contribution Award by Maharashtra Government
- 2012 - Ma-Ta Sanmaan as Best Serial for Suvasini
