= Checkmate (2008 film) =

2008 Indian Marathi-language thriller film

- Directed by: Sanjay Jadhav
- Written by: Sanjay Jadhav (story)
- Screenplay by: Vivek Apte
- Produced by: Kanchan Satpute; Chandrashekhar Mahamuni
- Starring: Ankush Choudhary; Swapnil Joshi; Rahul Mehendale; Sonali Khare; Sanjay Narvekar; Anand Abhyankar; Vinay Apte
- Cinematography: Sanjay Jadhav
- Edited by: Rajesh Rao
- Music by: Ajay Atul; Sunil Kaushik
- Release date: 2008
- Country: India
- Language: Marathi
- Budget: ₹1 crore (US$100,000)

Checkmate is a 2008 Marathi-language thriller film written and directed by Sanjay Jadhav, produced by Kanchan Satpute and Chandrashekhar Mahamuni. The film stars Ankush Chaudhari, Swapnil Joshi, Rahul Mehendale, Sonali Khare, Sanjay Narvekar.

== Plot ==
Vishal, Mohan, and Tushar fall victim to a fraudulent scheme promising to double their money. When their attempts to seek help from the authorities fail, Vishal takes matters into his own hands by raiding the scheme operator Bhalya's hideout. He manages to escape with the money by orchestrating a fake death for Mohan and Tushar. However, Bhalya discovers that Tushar is alive and takes him to his boss, Sampatrao Mahabal.

Vishal and Mohan eventually find themselves at Sampatrao's location, where a chilling ultimatum awaits. Sampatrao demands that Vishal must either genuinely eliminate Mohan and Tushar or return the embezzled money. In an attempt to evade this dire situation, Mohan devises a ruse proposing a fictitious scheme to repay Sampatrao ₹50 Crore within 30 days. Agreeing to this proposal, Sampatrao keeps Tushar in captivity until the promised sum is returned. To ensure compliance, Sampatrao dispatches his brother Rajan to accompany Vishal and Mohan, serving as a watchful eye on their every move.

== Cast ==
- Ankush Choudhary as Vishal Korgaonkar
- Swapnil Joshi as Mohan Bhave
- Rahul Mehendale as Tushar Jaikar
- Sonali Khare as Sunila
- Sanjay Narvekar as Rajan Mahabal
- Anand Abhyankar as Shekhar Divadkar
- Vinay Apte as Sampatrao Mahabal
- Bharat Ganeshpure as Raghu Jangam
- Sandesh Jadhav as Inspector Sandesh Jadhav
- Ravi Kale as Inspector Rane
- Ravi Patwardhan as Vishal's father
- Hrudaynath Rane as Bhalya
- Uday Sabnis as Inspector Zende
- Chinmayee Sumeet as Sulochana Mahabal
- Smita Talwalkar as Mohan's mother
- Resham Tipnis
- Madhura Velankar
- Priya Khopkar
- Asit Redij

== Music ==
The film has only one song which is composed by Ajay–Atul and Sunil Kaushik with lyrics written by Earl D'souza & Ajay Atul.

Title	Singer(s)	Length
Checkmate Title Track	Ajay Gogavale, Earl D'souza	4:01
