= Tunnu Ki Tina =

- Directed by: Paresh Kamdar
- Written by: Paresh Kamdar
- Produced by: National Film Development Corporation of India (NFDC)
- Starring: Sunil Barve; Rajeshwari Sachdev; Rohini Hattangadi
- Cinematography: K. K. Mahajan
- Edited by: Paresh Kamdar
- Music by: Vishal Bhardwaj
- Distributed by: NFDC
- Release date: 1997
- Running time: 120 min
- Country: India
- Language: Hindi

Tunnu Ki Tina (transl. Tunnu's Tina) is a 1997 Indian Hindi-language comedy drama film about a middle class Indian boy who dreams big and wants to marry a rich girl in college life. When he faces reality, however, he feels great pain. Major characters were portrayed by Renuka Shahane, Rohini Hattangadi, Rajeshwari Sachdev, and Sunil Barve.

== Plot ==
The film follows the story of Tunnu (Barve), a middle-class college student, and his string of romantic misfortunes. He initially falls for a girl from a similar background (Shahane), only to abandon her after being seduced by the glamorous Tina (Rajeshwari), who strokes his narcissism. Tunnu’s misadventures are interwoven with those of his conman father (Saxena), a shady real-estate broker. In the end, the father suffers a financial collapse, Tunnu’s sister elopes with a slum activist, and his girlfriend leaves him—leaving Tunnu wondering if she was ever real. Undaunted, he joins the real-estate business, his optimism still intact

== Cast ==
- Sunil Barve as Tunnu
- Rohini Hattangadi as Tunnu Mother
- Rajeshwari Sachdev as Tina
- Niraj Sah as College student
- Ninad Kamat
- Veerendra Saxena as Tunnu's Father
- Ramesh Shah as Professor
- Renuka Shahane as Tunnu's First Girlfriend
