= Ashi Hi Jamva Jamvi =

2025 Indian film by Lokesh Gupte

- Theatrical release poster
- Directed by: Lokesh Gupte
- Written by: Story: Lokesh Gupte; Screenplay and dialogue: Lokesh Gupte; Vibhav Rajadhyaksha
- Produced by: Rahul Shantaram
- Starring: Ashok Saraf; Vandana Gupte
- Cinematography: Arjun Sorte
- Edited by: Lokesh Gupte; Shritej Patwardhan
- Music by: Amitraj
- Production company: Rajkamal Entertainment
- Distributed by: Panorama Studios
- Release date: 10 April 2025
- Country: India
- Language: Marathi

Ashi Hi Jamva Jamvi is a 2025 Indian Marathi-language rom-com drama film written and directed by Lokesh Gupte and produced by Rahul Shantaram under Rajkamal Entertainment. The film stars Ashok Saraf and Vandana Gupte in the lead roles, along with Omkar Kulkarni and Tanishka Vishe in pivotal roles. The story showcases how friendship and love can blossom at any age.

== Cast ==
- Ashok Saraf as Mohan
- Vandana Gupte as Vandana
- Sunil Barve as Niranjan
- Chaitrali Gupte as Nivedita
- Milind Phatak as Shekhar
- Sulekha Talwalkar as Nilima
- Pushkaraj Chirputkar as Nitin
- Omkar Kulkarni as Abhishek
- Tanishka Vishe as Sara

== Production ==
The film was officially announced in December 2024. It marks the debut production venture of Rahul Shantaram, grandson of legendary filmmaker V. Shantaram, under the banner of Rajkamal Entertainment, formerly known as Rajkamal Kalamandir. It features actress Chaitrali Gupte, the wife of director Lokesh Gupte, making her first appearance on screen while working under his direction.

== Soundtrack ==
The film's music are composed by Amitraj.

Track listing
No.	Title	Lyrics	Singer(s)	Length
1.	"Mastikhor"	Kshitij Patwardhan	Rupali Moghe, Harshavardhan Wavare	2:49
2.	"Phulala Phul"	Kshitij Patwardhan	Bela Shende, Amitraj	3:15
Total length:				6:04

== Release ==
Ashi Hi Jamva Jamvi was initially scheduled for release on 25 April 2025. However, in early March 2025, the makers unveiled the first-look poster featuring the four lead actors, along with an announcement of the film’s preponed release date. The teaser, introducing the primary and supporting cast, was released on 17 March 2025, followed by the official trailer launch on 2 April 2025.
