= Gaav Gata Gajali =

Marathi-language comedy series

- Genre: Comedy; Drama
- Written by: Pralhad Kudtarkar
- Directed by: Raju Sawant
- Starring: See below
- Country of origin: India
- Original language: Marathi
- No. of seasons: 2
- No. of episodes: 155

Production
- Producer: Sunil Bhosale
- Camera setup: Multi-camera
- Running time: 22 minutes
- Production company: Sajari Creations

Original release
- Network: Zee Marathi
- Release: 2 August 2017 – 9 November 2018

Gaav Gata Gajali is an Indian Marathi language television series which aired on Zee Marathi. It is produced by Sunil Bhosale and written by Pralhad Kudtarkar under the banner of Sajari Creations. The series premiered from 2 August 2017 by replacing Chukbhul Dyavi Ghyavi.

== Seasons ==
Season	Episodes	Originally Broadcast	
Season	Episodes	First aired	Last aired
1	121	2 August 2017	17 March 2018
2	34	13 September 2018	9 November 2018

== Cast ==
- Pralhad Kudtarkar as Sandeep
- Shubhangi Bhujbal as Savita
- Deepali Jadhav as Padma
- Asmita Khatkhate as Godavari
- Rohan Surve as Manohar (Bali)
- Rohan Kotekar as Karan
- Rohit Kotekar as Arjun
- Digambar Naik as Suhas Nare
- Kishor Ravrane as Waman
- Bharat Sawale as Aaba
- Mithil Mahadeshwar as Ujjwal (Bail)
- Vishwajeet Palav as Prasad
- Leena Patkar as Shobha Nare
- Mukesh Jadhav as Baban
- Sarthak Vatwe as Krish
- Shubha Kadam as Sakhu

== Reception ==
=== Ratings ===
Week	Year	BARC Viewership		Ref.
Week	Year	TRP	Rank	Ref.
Week 31	2017	2.5	5	
Week 9	2018	2.0	5	
