= ND Studios =

Film studio in Mumbai, India

- Industry: film production, television production
- Founded: 2005
- Founders: Nitin Chandrakant Desai
- Headquarters: Karjat, Maharashtra, India
- Key people: Nitin Chandrakant Desai
- Owners: Nitin Chandrakant Desai
- Website: www.ndsfmworld.com www.nitindesaiartworld.com

ND Studios is a film and television production studio located in Karjat, Maharashtra a north suburb of Mumbai. Established in 2005, it is owned by Nitin Chandrakant Desai . Apart from films, it is also the location reality TV series, Bigg Boss hosted by Salman Khan.

Over the years, it has also become a popular tourist destination, as it is a 90-minute drive from Mumbai, Maharashtra.

== History ==
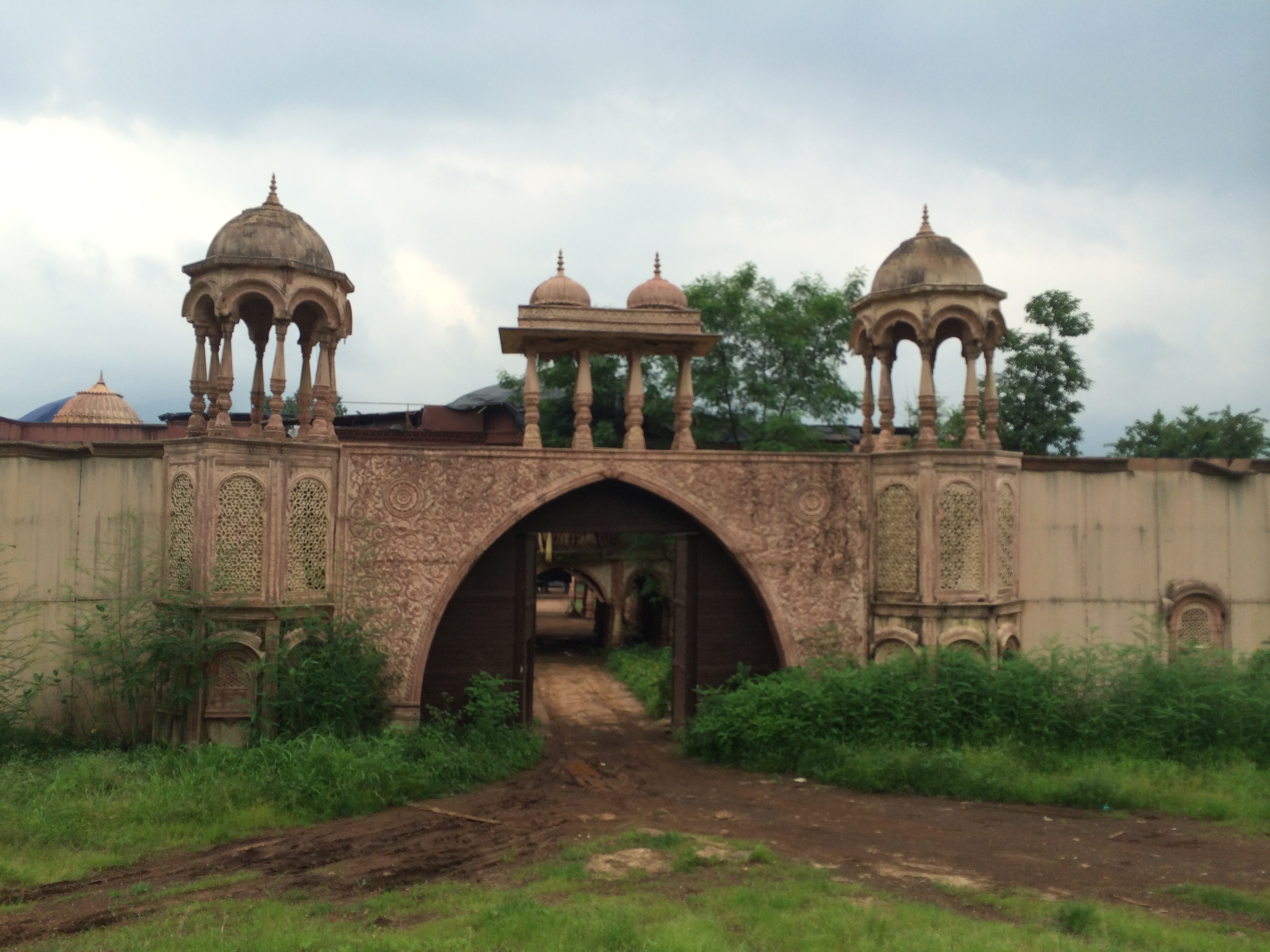
A part of the now-ageing Jodhaa Akbar sets at ND Studios - Akbar's Fort's entry.

The Studio is spread over 52 acres (210,000 m^{2}) and was opened in 2005 and offers indoor as well as outdoor shooting options. The Studio is privately owned by production designer Nitin Chandrakant Desai .

In 2008, US-based movie studio 20th Century Fox signed a 10-year deal to hire four floors at ND Studios.

== Location used for ==
- Slumdog Millionaire (2008)
- Prem Ratan Dhan Payo (2015)
- Chakravartin Ashoka Samrat
- Lean On (2015)
