= Suhas Joshi =

Indian theater, film, & television actress (born 1947)

- Born: Suhasini Kale; 12 July 1947 (age 78); Maharashtra, India
- Occupation: Actress
- Years active: 1972–present
- Spouse: Subhash Joshi

Suhas Joshi is an Indian actress in Marathi theater, film and television. She has also worked in many Bollywood films. She was awarded the Sangeet Natak Akademi Award for 2018 for Acting. In 2023 she Received Filmfare Marathi Lifetime Achievement Award for her contributions to Marathi cinema.

== Career ==
Joshi was attracted to the field of acting from her college days where she acted in few plays. Noticing her interest in it, she did a 3-year diploma course in acting from National School of Drama, Delhi where she was trained by noted theater director Ebrahim Alkazi.

Joshi started her career in 1972 with the Marathi play Barrister. Directed by Vijaya Mehta, the play was written by Jaywant Dalvi based on his previously published novel Andharachya Parambya. Joshi played the role of Radha in this play where the lead title role of Barrister was played by Vikram Gokhale. Later on, Joshi starred in various other plays. Her notable plays include Sai Paranjpye's Sakkhe Shejari and Vijay Tendulkar's Kanyadaan. Her role in Kanyadaan was opposite veteran actor Dr. Shriram Lagoo. The play was produced by the Marathi unit of the organization Indian National Theatre. Directed by Sadashiv Amrapurkar, who also played a role in the play, the drama performed more than 200 shows. Later, Joshi co-starred with Lagoo on various plays like Agnipankha, Natasamraat and Ekach Pyaala.

Joshi also performed the Monologue play Smriti Chitre which is based on the autobiography of Lakshmibai Tilak, wife of Reverend Narayan Waman Tilak. The play follows Lakshmibai's journey from a Hindu-Brahmin woman to her adopting Christianity in her husband's footsteps. The autobiography is considered as one of the masterpieces of Marathi literature and has also been translated to English as "I Follow After". Being a monologue, Joshi has worked out 3-4 different voices, including that of males. The play had previously been played by Kusumtai.

Joshi has also worked in various Bollywood film. Some of her notable works were in commercially successful film like Tezaab (1988), Chandni (1989) and Josh (2000). She has also acted in Marathi films like Tu Tithe Mee (1998) and Saatchya Aat Gharat (2004). For her work in Tu Tithe Mee, Joshi has received various awards and has been widely appreciated. Produced by Smita Talwalkar and directed by Sanjay Surkar, the film was adjudged as the Best Feature Film in Marathi at the 46th National Film Awards. In their official citation, the jury also appreciated Joshi's and her co-star Mohan Joshi's works by quoting "Beautiful performance by Mohan Joshi and Suhas Joshi are the highlights of the film."

Apart from her wide long theater and films career, Joshi was also seen in Marathi as well as Hindi television shows. As of 2012, she is seen in the Hindi TV show Khamoshiyaan that airs on Star Plus.

== Personal life ==
Joshi has done her Bachelor of Arts from the University of Pune in the subjects Philosophy, Psychology and Sanskrit language. She is also trained in classical music and has given four examinations (Madhyama) of Gandharva Mahavidyalaya. She is married to Subhash Joshi, who is also a theater artist. She has 2 kids, Sonali Joshi and Saket Joshi.

== Selected filmography ==
=== Films ===
"I am completely satisfied about my roles and love acting in dramas. But I am not fully satisfied with my roles in films except Tu Tithe Mee as I did not got any challenging role in serials or films."

— Joshi speaking about her acting career.

| Year | Title | Role | Language |
|---|---|---|---|
| 1987 | Kaalchakra | | Hindi |
| 1988 | Tezaab | Mohini's mother | Hindi |
| 1989 | Chandni | | Hindi |
| 1989 | Daddy | Mrs. Kantaprasad | Hindi |
| 1991 | Love | Prithvi's mother | Hindi |
| 1992 | Saatwan Aasman | Suraj's mother | Hindi |
| 1992 | Nishpaap | | Marathi |
| 1993 | Aaj Kie Aurat | Mrs. Verma | Hindi |
| 1994 | Aag | | Hindi |
| 1995 | Aatank Hi Aatank | Mrs. Aslam Pathan | Hindi |
| 1995 | Taaqat | Mrs. Dinanath | Hindi |
| 1995 | Aazmayish | Mrs. Khanna | Hindi |
| 1996 | Papa Kehte Hai | Mrs. Gandhi | Hindi |
| 1996 | Aisi Bhi Kya Jaldi Hai | Principal | Hindi |
| 1998 | Tu Tithe Mee | Usha Date | Marathi |
| 2000 | Josh | Rahul's mom | Hindi |
| 2001 | Asoka | Kalinga Senate Member | Hindi |
| 2001 | Hum Ho Gaye Aapke | Mohan's Mother | Hindi |
| 2003 | Paanch | Magistrate | Hindi |
| 2004 | Saatchya Aat Gharat | | Marathi |
| 2011 | Balgandharva | Narayan's mother | Marathi |
| 2013 | Ramchandra Purushottam Joshi]l | Janki Ramchandra Joshi | Marathi |
| 2014 | Premasathi Coming Suun | Aditya's grandmother | Marathi |
| 2015 | Mumbai-Pune-Mumbai 2 | Suhas Pradhan (Gautam's grandmother) | Marathi |
| 2018 | Bogda | Maai | Marathi |
| 2018 | Mumbai-Pune-Mumbai 3 | Suhas Pradhan (Gautam's grandmother) | Marathi |
| 2021 | Jhimma | Indumati Karnik a.k.a. Indu | Marathi |
| 2022 | Ekda Kaay Zala | Kiran's mother | Marathi |
| 2023 | Jhimma 2 | Indumati Karnik a.k.a. Indu | Marathi |
| 2024 | Munjya | Bittu's grandmother | Hindi |
| 2024 | Hi Anokhi Gaath | Shreenivas's mother | Marathi |
| 2025 | Gaadi Number 1760 | Aaji | Marathi |

=== Theater ===
Marathi plays
| Title | Role | Notes |
|---|---|---|
| Barrister | Radha | |
| Gharoghari | | |
| Doctor Tumhi Suddha | | |
| Natasamrat | | |
| Agnipankh | | |
| Ekach Pyala | | |
| Kanyadaan | | |
| Sakkhe Shejari | | |
| Anandi Gopal | | |
| Prema Tuza Ranga Kasa | | |
| Smriti Chitre | Lakshmibai Tilak | Monologue |
| Katha | Maltibai | |

=== Television ===
| Year | Title | Role | Language | Channel |
|---|---|---|---|---|
| 1999 | Prapancha | Pramila | Marathi | Zee Marathi |
| 1999-2001 | Aabhalmaya | | Marathi | Zee Marathi |
| 2002-2003 | Jagavegali | | Marathi | Zee Marathi |
| 2008 | Ek Packet Umeed | Bakuben | Hindi | NDTV Imagine |
| 2009–2010 | Agnihotra | Prabha Keshav Risbud | Marathi | Star Pravah |
| 2009–2012 | Kunku | Krishna | Marathi | Zee Marathi |
| 2012–2013 | Mujhse Kuchh Kehti...Yeh Khamoshiyaan | Mrs. Bhosle | Hindi | StarPlus |
| 2022–present | Tu Tevha Tashi | Rama Joshi | Marathi | Zee Marathi |

== Awards ==
For her performance in the film Tu Tithe Mee, She won Filmfare Award Marathi for Best Actress. For the same film and in the same category, she also received the Screen Award in 1999. In 2011, Joshi also received a "Ganga-Jamuna Award" for her works in the Marathi theater. The award is presented jointly by Thane Municipal Corporation and P Sawalaram Smriti Samiti (PSSS). She was awarded the Sangeet Natak Akademi Award for 2018 for Acting. In 2024, Joshi received the Vishnudas Bhave Gaurav Medal Award.
