= Putalabai =

Queen Consort of the Maratha Empire

Putalabai Bhonsale
- Maharani of the Maratha Kingdom

Queen consort of Maratha Empire
- Tenure: 1674 - 1680
- Predecessor: Soyarabai
- Successor: Yesubai
- Born: Putalabai
- Died: 27 June 1680; Raigad Fort, Maratha Kingdom (present-day Raigad district, Maharashtra)
- Spouse: Shivaji (m. 1653)
Names
- Putalabai Shivajiraje Bhonsale
Regnal name
- Shrimant Akhand Soubhagyavati Putalabai Rani Saheb Bhosale
- House: Palkar/Mohite
- Religion: Hinduism

Putalabai Bhosale (née Palkar) was the third wife of the Maratha king Chhatrapati Shivaji. She was from Palkar Family and married Shivaji in 1653. Putalabai had no children. She committed Sati after the death of Shivaji Maharaj.

== In popular culture ==
=== Films and television ===
- Anupama portrayed Putulabai in the 1974 Indian historical film Raja Shiv Chhatrapati .
- Samira Gujar portrayed Putulabai in the popular 2008 TV series Raja Shivchhatrapati.
- Smita Shewale portrayed Putulabai in 2011 TV serial Veer Shivaji.
- Pallavi Vaidya played Putulabai in Swarajyarakshak Sambhaji, a 2017-2020 television show that depicted the life of Shivaji Maharaj's son Sambhaji Maharaj.
- Saayali Sunil plays Putulabai in Swarajyajanani Jijamata.
