= Kunku (TV series) =

2009 Indian Marathi-language TV series

- Genre: Drama
- Written by: Chinmay Mandlekar
- Story by: Rakesh Sarang
- Directed by: Pratima Kulkarni; Mangesh Kanthale
- Starring: See below
- Country of origin: India
- Original language: Marathi
- No. of episodes: 791

Production
- Producer: Sangita Sarang
- Production locations: Mumbai, Maharashtra
- Camera setup: Multi-camera
- Running time: 22 minutes
- Production company: CamsKlub Studios

Original release
- Network: Zee Marathi
- Release: 27 July 2009 – 4 February 2012

Kunku is an Indian Marathi language television series which aired on Zee Marathi. It starred Sunil Barve and Mrunmayee Deshpande in lead roles. It is produced by Sangita Sarang and directed by Pratima Kulkarni under the banner of CamsKlub Studios. It premiered from 27 July 2009 and ended on 4 February 2012 completing 791 episodes.

== Plot ==
Narsingh Killedar, a powerful and experienced politician, was still struggling with the pain of losing his wife. She had died very recently, leaving behind their teenage daughter Amruta. Despite his grief, Narsingh harbored a strong ambition - to become the chief minister in the upcoming elections. However, his dreams were shattered by a shocking prophecy. Bhavani Mai, a woman known for her foresight, predicted that Narsingh wouldn't even live to see the elections. This threw Narsingh into a deep mental turmoil.

But there was a glimmer of hope. A solution was proposed - a way to avoid this terrible fate. Apparently, Narsingh needed to marry an unmarried virgin. This presented a whole new challenge for Krushna Aatya, Narsinha's aunt. Finding a young woman willing to marry a man of Narsingh's age, especially amidst such unusual circumstances, seemed like an impossible task. Krushna Aatya's initial attempts to find a suitable candidate proved unsuccessful.

Then, fate intervened. A poor villager, burdened by financial difficulties, left his young daughter, Janaki, at the doorstep of the Killedar family. Krushna Aatya saw Janaki as the answer to their prayers. Janaki, unaware of the true reason behind her sudden inclusion in the household, seemed like the perfect fit for Narsinha's second marriage. However, this decision would set in motion a series of events that would change the lives of everyone involved, particularly Janaki, who was about to be thrust into a world far different from the one she knew.

== Cast ==
=== Main ===
- Sunil Barve as Narsingh Killedar
- Mrunmayee Deshpande as Janaki Subhan Pawar / Janaki Narsingh Killedar

=== Recurring ===
- Suhas Joshi as Krishna
- Sharad Ponkshe as Parshuram Killedar
- Manasi Kulkarni as Amruta Narsingh Killedar
- Mousami Tondwalkar as Narmada Narsingh Killedar
- Siddheshwar Zadbuke as Padmakar Waknis
- Snehlata Tawde as Ahilya Waman Killedar
- Anand Ingale as Waman Killedar
- Pooja Nayak as Sumitra Parshuram Killedar
- Prafulla Bhalerao as Ganesh Subhan Pawar
- Ashok Sawant as Subhan Pawar
- Geetanjali Kambli as Rakhma Subhan Pawar
- Dipti Ketkar as Radhika
- Janardan Parab as Damu
- Vijay Patwardhan as Kanifnath Karve
- Vrishasen Dabholkar as Rajan
- Madhavi Nimkar as Vanita
- Bhushan Pradhan as Aryan
- Sulabha Deshpande
- Neha Shitole
- Mugdha Shah
- Sunil Godbole
- Sunil Tawde
- Sneha Raikar
- Kanchan Gupte
- Shweta Mehendale
- Vijay Mishra
- Prajakta Kelkar
- Sunila Karambelkar
- Kishori Ambiye

== Awards ==
Zee Marathi Utsav Natyancha Awards
Year	Category	Recipient	Role	Ref.
2010	Best Actress	Mrunmayee Deshpande	Janaki	
2010	Best Father	Sunil Barve	Narsingh	
2010	Best Negative Actor	Sharad Ponkshe	Parshuram	
2010	Best Character Female	Suhas Joshi	Krishna	
2010	Best Supporting Female	Dipti Ketkar	Radhika	
2010	Best Supporting Male	Siddheshwar Zadbuke	Padmakar	
2010	Best Siblings	Mrunmayee Deshpande-Prafulla Bhalerao	Janaki-Ganesh	
2010	Best Series			
2011	Best Character Female	Mrunmayee Deshpande	Janaki	
2011	Best Family	Killedar Family		
2011	Best Siblings	Mrunmayee Deshpande-Prafulla Bhalerao	Janaki-Ganesh	

== Reception ==
Week	Year	TAM TVR	Rank		Ref.
Week	Year	TAM TVR	Mah/Goa	All India	Ref.
Week 45	2009	0.7	3	93	
Week 50	2009	0.8	2	92	
Week 52	2009	0.9	2	86	
Week 1	2010	1.0	1	57	
Week 5	2010	0.7	3	98	
Week 7	2010	0.8	1	92	
Week 11	2010	0.7	3	99	
Week 32	2010	0.68	4	99	
Week 37	2010	0.7	1	97	

== Adaptations ==
Language	Title	Original release	Network(s)	Last aired	Notes
Marathi	Kunku कुंकू	27 July 2009	Zee Marathi	4 February 2012	Original
Kannada	Chi Sow Savithri ಚಿ ಸೌ ಸಾವಿತ್ರಿ	26 July 2010	Zee Kannada	27 July 2012	Remake
Telugu	Pasupu Kumkuma పసుపు కుంకుమ	22 November 2010	Zee Telugu	15 November 2014	Remake
