= Vadalvaat =

2003 Indian Marathi language TV series

- Genre: Drama
- Written by: Abhay Paranjape, Chinmay Mandlekar
- Directed by: Mandar Devsthali
- Starring: See below
- Opening theme: "Ek Vadalachi Vaat" by Devaki Pandit
- Composer: Ashok Patki
- Country of origin: India
- Original language: Marathi
- No. of episodes: 939

Production
- Producer: Shashank Solanki
- Production locations: Mumbai, Maharashtra
- Camera setup: Multi-camera
- Running time: 22 minutes
- Production company: Seventh Sense Media

Original release
- Network: Zee Marathi
- Release: 7 July 2003 – 9 February 2007

Vadalvaat (transl. The Road of Storm) is an Indian Marathi language television series which aired on Zee Marathi. It is produced by Shashank Solanki and directed by Mandar Devsthali under the banner of Seventh Sense Media. It starred Aditi Sarangdhar and Lokesh Gupte in lead roles. It premiered from 7 July 2003 by replacing Aabhalmaya. It ended on 9 February 2007 completing 939 episodes.

== Plot ==
The focal point is the Chaudhari family, spearheaded by Aabasaheb. This dynamic household consists of Aabasaheb's three children—Satyajit, Soham and Shravani—each contributing to the intricate narrative. At the heart of their endeavors is the family-owned newspaper 'Nirbhid'.

== Cast ==
=== Main ===
- Aditi Sarangdhar as Rama Chaudhari
- Lokesh Gupte as Samar Ajinkya

=== Recurring ===
- Arun Nalawade as Shrikrishna Chaudhari (Aaba)
- Meghana Vaidya as Sulakshana Chaudhari
- Neelam Shirke as Vishakha Chaudhari
- Ashish Kulkarni / Shekhar Phadake as Nikhil Saranjame
- Hemangi Kavi / Shubhada Patankar as Shravani Chaudhari
- Prasad Oak as Bhaskar Chaudhari
- Pooja Nayak as Janhavi Chaudhari
- Umesh Kamat as Soham Chaudhari
- Avinash Narkar as Satyajeet Chaudhari
- Anuradha Rajadhyaksha as Purva Chaudhari
- Sharad Ponkshe as Devram Khandagale
- Pushkar Shrotri as Pratap Khandagale
- Sunil Godse as Shivram Khandagale
- Subodh Bhave as Jaysingh Rajput
- Sukanya Kulkarni as Vaijayanti Barve-Mujumdar
- Chinmay Mandlekar as Samsher Singh
- Kshitee Jog as Alandi Chhatre
- Shweta Shinde as Monika Sardesai
- Anand Abhyankar as Uddhav Gadre
- Vighnesh Joshi as Shree Kalyani
- Prajakta Hanamghar as Shriya Kalyani
- Abhijeet Chavan as Krushna Gunjal
- Akshay Pendse as Parth Vidwans
- Prabhakar Panashikar as Bhaiyya Chaudhari
- Rujuta Deshmukh as Saumya Raichand
- Vibhavari Pradhan as Samidha
- Santosh Juvekar as Shailesh Kavishwar
- Mitalee Jagtap Varadkar as Gayatri Kavishwar
- Pratima Kulkarni as Vasundhara Karkhanis
- Smita Oak as Lalita Kavishwar
- Maithili Jawkar as Champa Khandagale
- Mandar Chandwadkar as Sandesh Kothare
- Milind Shinde as Shrikant Vazalvar
- Mahesh Subhedar as Subhash Salvi
- Pankaj Vishnu as Ajay Nimbalkar
- Angad Mhaskar as Ujjwal
- Bharat Ganeshpure as Baban Ghodghate
- Aastad Kale as Anand Kane
- Ajinkya Joshi as Ulhas
- Nilpari Khanwalkar as Neeta Joshi
- Mandar Devsthali as Vishwambar Pai
- Vinita Kale as Sanjyot Mujumdar
- Ketan Kshirsagar as Anand Rasal
- Rashmi Solanki as Shruti Jahagirdar
- Madhavi Soman as Nirmala Sadafule
- Chaitrali Gupte as Jaya Nikam
- Prashant Choudappa as Abhijeet
- Shubhangi Joshi as Jiji
- Uday Sabnis as Anna
- Anant Jog as Maharav
- Rama Joshi as Asha
- Usha Nadkarni

== Awards ==
Zee Marathi Utsav Natyancha Awards
Year	Category	Recipient	Role	Ref.
2004	Best Character Female	Aditi Sarangdhar	Rama Chaudhari	
2004	Best Father	Arun Nalawade	Aaba Chaudhari	
2004	Best Negative Actor	Sharad Ponkshe	Devram Khandagale	
2004	Best Negative Actress	Neelam Shirke	Vishakha Chaudhari	
2004	Best Series	Mandar Devsthali	Director	
2005	Best Actor	Arun Nalawade	Aaba Chaudhari	
2005	Best Father	Arun Nalawade	Aaba Chaudhari	
2005	Best Actress	Aditi Sarangdhar	Rama Chaudhari	
2005	Best Character Female	Aditi Sarangdhar	Rama Chaudhari	
2005	Best Supporting Male	Lokesh Gupte	Samar Ajinkya	
2005	Best Supporting Female	Shubhada Patankar	Shravani Chaudhari	
2005	Best Negative Actor	Sharad Ponkshe	Devram Khandagale	
2005	Best Character Male	Subodh Bhave	Jaysingh Rajput	
2005	Best Mother	Meghana Vaidya	Sulakshana Chaudhari	
2005	Best Couple	Arun Nalawade-Meghana Vaidya	Aaba-Sulakshana	
2005	Best Title Song	Shashank Solanki	Producer	
2005	Best Series	Mandar Devsthali	Director	
2005	Best Family		Chaudhari Family	
2006	Best Supporting Female	Pooja Nayak	Janhavi Chaudhari	
2006	Best Character Female	Aditi Sarangdhar	Rama Chaudhari	
2006	Best Negative Actor	Sharad Ponkshe	Devram Khandagale	
2006	Best Father	Arun Nalawade	Aaba Chaudhari	
2006	Best Mother	Meghana Vaidya	Sulakshana Chaudhari	
2006	Best Family		Chaudhari family	
