= Nitin Chandrakant Desai =

Indian art director (1965–2023)

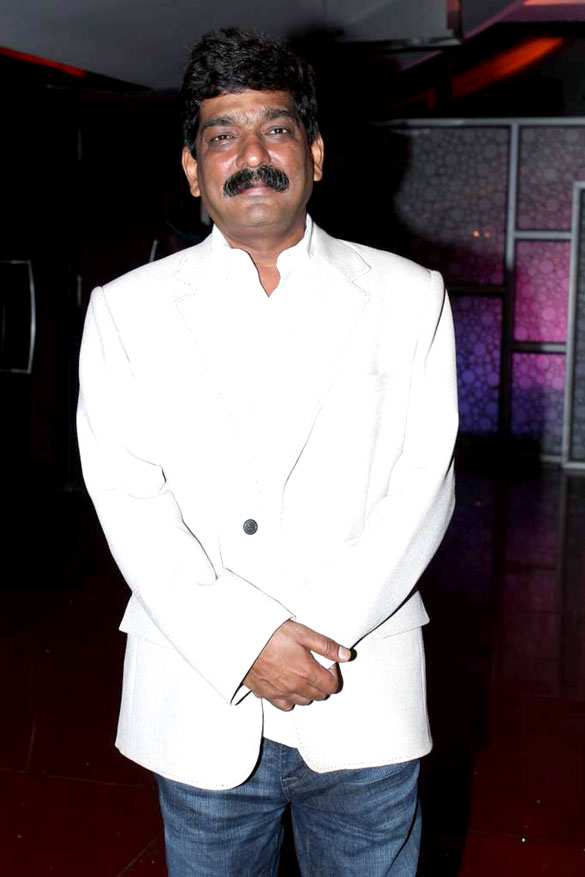
- Desai in 2012
- Born: 6 August 1965; Mulund, Bombay, Maharashtra, India
- Died: 2 August 2023 (aged 57); N. D. Studio, Chowk, Khalapur, Dist Raigad, Maharashtra, India
- Education: Sir J.J. Institute of Applied Art; L.S.Raheja School of Arts
- Occupations: Actor, filmmaker, Art director, production designer
- Years active: 1987–2023
- Notable work: Jodhaa Akbar; Ajintha; Harishchandrachi Factory; Hum Dil De Chuke Sanam; Lagaan; Devdas; Balgandharva
- Website: www.ndsfilmworld.com

Nitin Chandrakant Desai (6 August 1965 – 2 August 2023) was an Indian art director, production designer, and film and television producer. He was most known for his work in Marathi and Hindi Films, World Cultural Festival 2016 at Delhi and films like, Hum Dil De Chuke Sanam (1999), Lagaan (2001), Devdas (2002), Jodhaa Akbar (2008) and Prem Ratan Dhan Payo (2015). During his career spanning twenty years, he worked with directors like Ashutosh Gowarikar, Vidhu Vinod Chopra, Rajkumar Hirani and Sanjay Leela Bhansali. In 2002, he turned film producer with Chandrakant Productions' Desh Devi, a devotional film on the Devi Mata of Kutch.

Desai won National Film Award for Best Art Direction four times, and Filmfare Best Art Direction Award three times. In 2005, he opened his ND Studios spread over 52 acres (21 ha) at Karjat, Navi Mumbai, near Mumbai, which has since hosted films like Jodhaa Akbar, Traffic Signal as also Color's reality show Big Boss.

For his contribution to cinema, he was included in the "In Memoriam" segment at the 96th Academy Awards ceremony in 2024.

== Early life and education ==
Desai was born in Mulund, Bombay, Maharashtra on 9 August 1965. He attended school at Wamanrao Muranjan High School, Mulund in a Marathi Medium. He studied photography at the J.J. School of Art and L.S.Raheja school of arts, in Mumbai, before joining the films.

== Career ==
Desai first went to Mumbai's Film City Studios in May 1987, and immediately switched from the 2-D format of still photography to a 3-D world of art direction. He joined noted art director, Nitish Roy as a fourth assistant for the period TV serial, Tamas (1987), directed by Govind Nihalani. Thereafter he worked TV series, Kabir for five-and-a-half years, series Chanakya for the first 25 episodes, and took over independently from the 26th episode onwards.

His first feature film was Adhikari Brothers's Bhookamp in 1993, but it was Vidhu Vinod Chopra's period film, 1942: A Love Story in 1994 that got him noticed. Over the years he has worked in films such as Parinda, Khamoshi, Maachis, Baadshah, Dr Babasaheb Ambedkar and Raju Chacha, international projects like Salaam Bombay!, Amok (a French film directed by Joel Farges, which won Desai a Pri Genie nomination), Jungle Book, Kama Sutra, the Canadian film Such a Long Journey and Holy Smoke. He also created two sets for Slumdog Millionaire 2008 film, which include the set of Kaun Banega Crorepati scene, incidentally he had also designed the set for the Star Plus TV series, and an interiors set of the Taj Mahal.

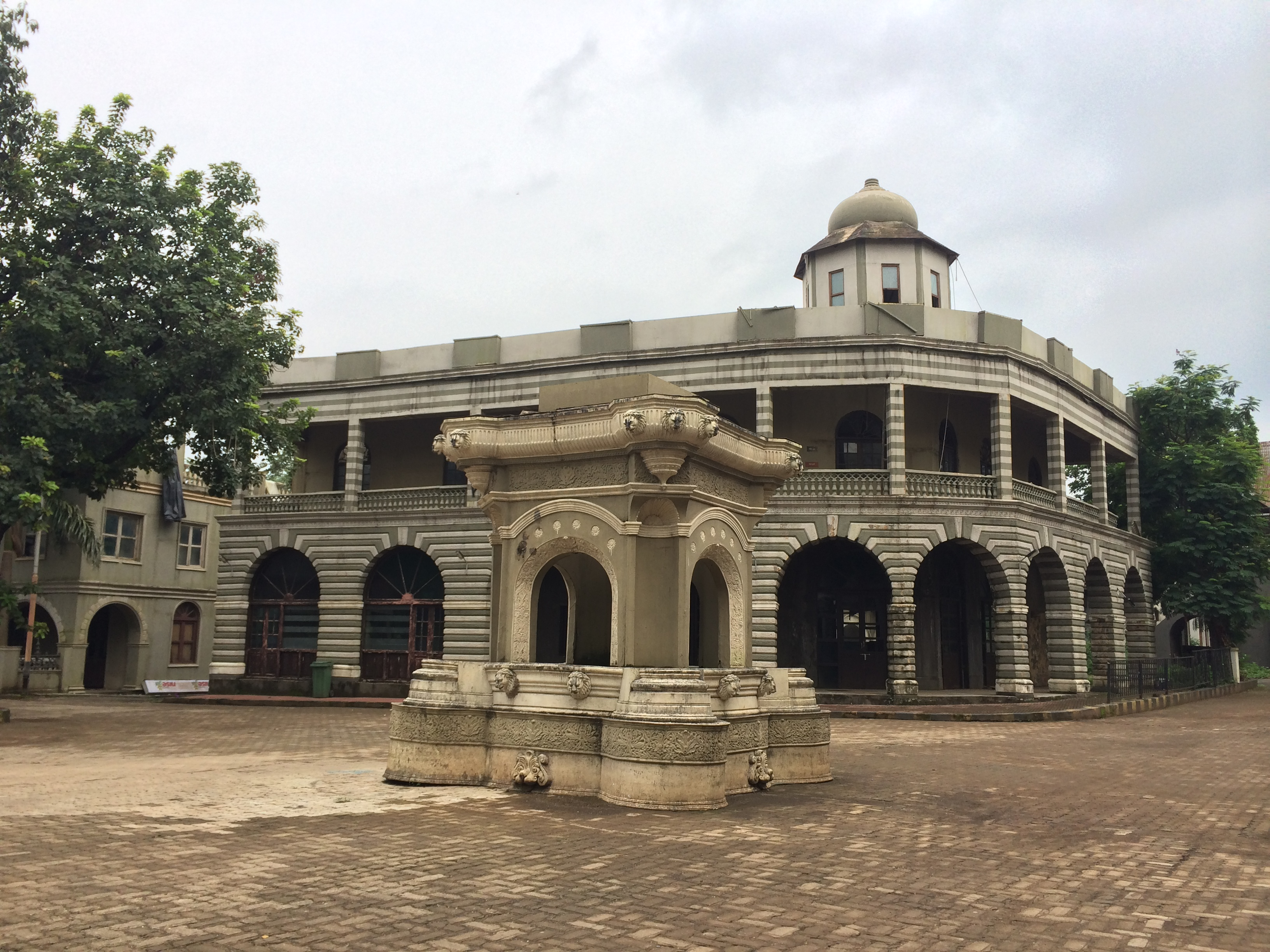
A set at ND Studios, Karjat.

He turned film producer in 2003, with devotional film, Desh Devi Maa Ashapura. Situated on the outskirts of Mumbai at Karjat, the ND studios was opened in 2005 by him. Spread over 52 acres (21 ha), later Reliance Entertainment picked up 50 per cent stake in the studio for about Rs 1.50 billion. He turned to producing TV series, with Marathi serial Raja Shivchhatrapati, which became a big hit.

In Marathi, he has produced a biopic movie Balgandharva released in May 2011. He has also produced a reality TV show Marathi Paul Padte Pudhe, which provides a platform for young talent. Concept is similar to America's Got Talent.

Desai was reportedly working on Amol Gupte's Sapno Ko Ginte Ginte. After producing Chittod Ki Rani Padmini Ka Johur (2009) television series, he was reportedly producing historic TV series, Taj Mahal and Baji Rao Mastani.

In 2011, he also debuted as a lead actor by the Marathi film Hello Jai Hind directed by Gajendra Ahire.

Most of Desai's successful work as an art director was in period films, as can be seen by the fact that all four of his National Film Award for Best Art Direction awards have been for period films.

== Death ==
Desai died by suicide in Karjat, Maharashtra, on 2 August 2023. He was 57.

== Filmography ==
=== As actor ===
Year	Title
1998–2001	Hum Sab Ek Hain
1997	Daud
2011	Hello Jai Hind!
2011	Balgandharva

=== As director ===
Year	Title
2012	Ajintha

==== As producer ====
Year	Title
2008	Raja Shivchhatrapati
2011	Balgandharva
2018	Truckbhar Swapna

=== As art director ===
Year	Title	Notes
1989	Parinda	
1993	1942: A Love Story	
1994	Aa Gale Lag Jaa	
1994	Droh Kaal	
1995	Oh Darling! Yeh Hai India	
1995	Akele Hum Akele Tum	
1995	The Don	
1995	Vijeta	
1995	Khamoshi: The Musical	
1996	Kama Sutra: A Tale of Love	
1996	Diljale	
1996	Maachis	
1997	Aar Ya Paar	
1997	Ishq	
1998	Kareeb	
1998	Keemat: They Are Back	
1998	Pyaar To Hona Hi Tha	
1998	Barood	
1998	Wajood	
1998	Salaam Bombay!	
1998	Dahek: A Burning Passion	
1999	Hu Tu Tu	
1999	Hum Dil De Chuke Sanam	
1999	Holy Smoke	
1999	Baadshah	
2000	Mela	
2000	Khauff	
2000	Jung	
2000	Josh	
2000	Mission Kashmir	
2000	Dr. Babasaheb Ambedkar	
2000	Raju Chacha	
2001	One 2 Ka 4	
2001	Lagaan	
2002	Pitaah	
2002	Filhaal...	
2002	Devdas	
2002	The Legend of Bhagat Singh	
2002	Annarth	
2003	Ek Hindustani	
2003	Chupke Se	
2003	Taj Mahal: A Monument of Love	
2003	Munnabhai M.B.B.S.	
2006	The Memsahib	
2006	Lage Raho Munna Bhai	
2006	Jaane Hoga Kya	
2007	Gandhi, My Father	
2007	Dhan Dhana Dhan Goal	
2008	Y.M.I. Yeh Mera India	
2008	God Tussi Great Ho	
2008	Dostana	
2008	Saas Bahu Aur Sensex	
2008	Little Zizou	
2009	Chittod Ki Rani Padmini Ka Johur	TV series
2009	What's Your Raashee?	
2009	Jail	
2010	Once Upon a Time in Mumbai	
2011	Balgandharva	
2019	Panipat	

=== As production designer ===
Year	Title	Notes
1997	Tunnu Ki Tina	
1998	Such a Long Journey	
1999	Hum Dil De Chuke Sanam	
2001	Lagaan (2001)	
2001	Ehsaas (2001)	
2002	Pitaah (2002	
2002	Mission Kashmir	
2002	Devdas	
2002	Hum Kisise Kum Nahin	
2004	Khakee	
2004	Swades	
2005	Mangal Pandey: The Rising	
2006	The Memsahib	
2006	Lage Raho Munna Bhai	
2007	Traffic Signal	
2007	Gandhi, My Father	
2007	Marigold	
2007	Eklavya: The Royal Guard	
2007	Dhan Dhana Dhan Goal	
2008	Jodhaa Akbar	
2008	Saas Bahu Aur Sensex	
2008	Fashion	
2010	Ishqiya	
2010	Shanti	
2010	Khelein Hum Jee Jaan Sey	
2013	Zapatlela 2	
2015	Prem Ratan Dhan Payo	
2020	Paurashpur	Web series

== Awards and nominations ==
=== National Film Award for Best Art Direction ===
Year	Film	Notes
1999	Dr. Babasaheb Ambedkar	
2000	Hum Dil De Chuke Sanam	
2002	Lagaan	
2003	Devdas	

=== Filmfare Best Art Direction ===
Year	Film	Notes
1995	1942: A Love Story	
1997	Khamoshi	
2003	Devdas	

=== IFA Best Art Direction Award ===
Year	Film	Notes
2009	Jodhaa Akbar	

=== Screen Awards – Best Art Direction ===
Year	Film	Notes
1994	1942 A Love Story	
1996	Khamoshi: The Musical	
1999	Hum Dil De Chuke Sanam	
2000	Josh	
2001	Lagaan	
2008	Gandhi, My Father	

=== Maharashtra State Film Awards – Best Art Direction ===
Year	Film	Notes
2009	Harishchandrachi Factory	

=== Genie Award for Best Achievement in Art Direction/Production Design ===
Film	Notes
19th Genie Awards: Such a Long Journey:	Nominated
