= Sunil Barve =

Marathi film, television and theatre actor

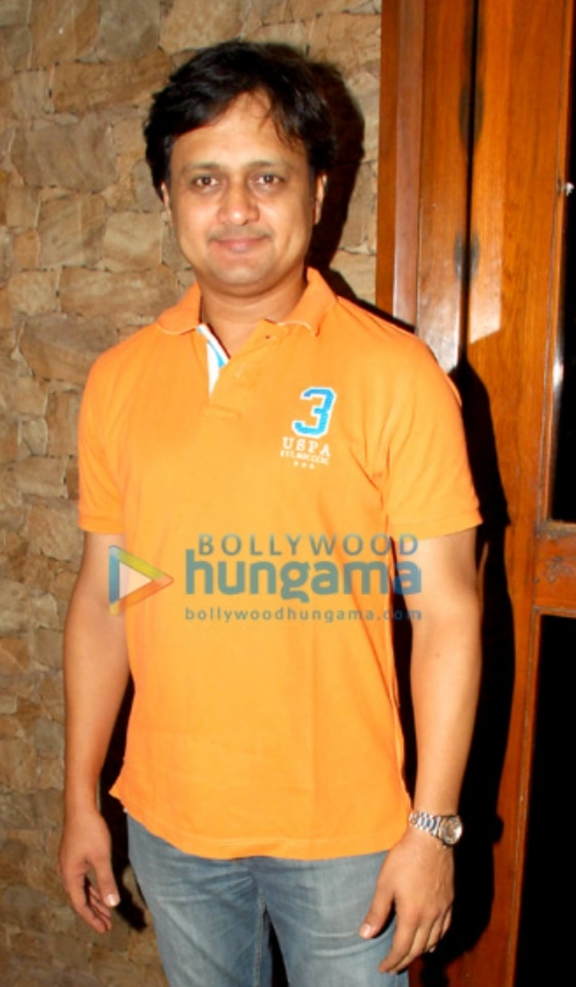
- Born: 3 October 1966 (age 60); Mumbai, Maharashtra, India
- Occupations: Actor, Producer
- Years active: 1980–present
- Spouse: Aparna Barve (m. 1991)
- Website: sunilbarve.com

Sunil Barve (Marathi: सुनील बर्वे) is an Indian film, television and theatre actor, singer and producer. Predominantly working in Marathi, he has also worked in Hindi and Gujarati entertainment industry. He is also a radio jockey. He started doing small roles for serials and theatres and starred in several Marathi films and serials. After 25 years in the industry, he launched an initiative named Herbarium through his production company Subak to "bring back the lost glory of Marathi musical plays".

== Career ==
Barve received a B.Sc. in Chemistry from Patkar College, Mumbai and worked as a medical representative in a company in Mumbai, but quit this job and turned towards acting.

Sunil Barve's production company Subak (Sunil Barve Kalakruti) has produced various plays. In 2010, as Barve completed 25 years in the Marathi theatre, he launched a new project called Herbarium. He reported that he wanted to "bring back the lost glory of Marathi musical plays" through this project and remade five classic plays with new directors and new cast; the theater directors were Pratima Kulkarni, Chandrakant Kulkarni, Mangesh Kadam, Vijay Kenkre and Girish Joshi, and Barve asked the directors to choose their play. Twenty-five performances of each play were given in various cities of Maharashtra and Goa. Barve noted that he desired only twenty-five performances of each play to match his twenty-five years in show business. The first play, performed in July 2010, was the classic comedy Suryachi Pille originally directed by Damu Kenkre in 1978 with a cast including Madhav Vatve, Bal Karve, Dilip Prabhavalkar, Mohan Gokhale, Sadashiv Amrapurkar and Shanta Jog. The new play is directed by Pratima Kulkarni and stars Uday Sabnis, Pushkar Shrotri, Aniket Vishwasrao and Aatisha Naik. The play is a comedy around three sons trying to prove their superiority in order to inherit their late father's legacy. Though the play and its star-cast was decided in advance, Barve decided to keep the name of the next play a surprise, to be announced only at the 25th show of the currently performed play.

== Filmography ==
=== Films ===
Year	Title	Role	Language
1989	Atmavishwas	Ajinkya 'Aju' A. Mangalkar	Marathi
1992	Aahuti	Vijay Vikram Rajadhyaksha	Marathi
1993	Lapandav	Asim A. Mahasabdey	Marathi
1995	Jamla Ho Jamla	Piyush Ghorpade	Marathi
1995	Aai	Deepak A. Pradhan	Marathi
1996	Sugandha		Marathi
1997	Tunnu Ki Tina	Tunnu	Hindi
1998	Tu Tithe Mee	Prasad Date	Marathi
2000	Astitva	Aniket Pandit	Hindi
2000	Nidaan	Ninad S. Kamat	Hindi
2006	Anandache Jhaad	Vivek Kemkar	Marathi
2006	Divasen Divas	Satish	Marathi
2006	Lalbagcha Raja	Shree	Marathi
2007	Gojiri	Shrikarerao Sahasrabuddhe	Marathi
2008	Mere Baap Pehle Aap	Unnamed	Hindi
2009	Paash	Sunil	Marathi
2010	Sa Sasucha	Kartik	Marathi
2011	Tuch Khari Gharchi Laxmi	Laxmi's husband	Marathi
2013	Prem Mhanje Prem Mhanje Prem Asta	Kedar	Marathi
2013	Shrimanta Damodar panta	Villain	Marathi
2014	Bhatukali	Ravikant	Marathi
2015	Saha Gun		Marathi
2015	Highway		Marathi
2015	Deool Band	Dr. Satyajeet	Marathi
2016	Bandh Nylonche	Jatin Wagle	Marathi
2016	Natsamrat	Rahul Barve / Vidya's husband	Marathi
2017	6 Gunn		Marathi
2018	Whatsup Lagna	Aakash's boss	
2019	Bhai - Vyakti Ki Valli - Part one	Jabbar Patel	Marathi
2019	Bhai - Vyakti Ki Valli - Part two	Jabbar Patel	Marathi
2019	Ashi Hi Ashiqui	Amarja's Father	Marathi
2019	Wedding Cha Shinema	Dr. Sameer Pradhan	Marathi
2019	Gondya Aala Re	Lokmanya Tilak	
2020	Dharan	Akhilesh Abhyankar	
2024	Swargandharva Sudhir Phadke	Sudhir Phadke	Marathi
2025	Ashi Hi Jamva Jamvi	Niranjan Acharya	Marathi
2025	Banjara	Vivek	Marathi

=== Television ===
Year	Title	Role	Language	Channel	Notes
	Abhi To Main Jawan Hoon		Hindi		
	Adhantari		Marathi		
	Awaaz		Hindi, Marathi		
	Bolachi Kadhi		Marathi		
	Chaal Nawachi Vachaal Vasti		Marathi		
	Chail Chabila		Gujarati		
	Jutthan Jariwala		Gujarati		
	Kora Kagaz		Hindi		
	Walwacha Paaus		Marathi		
	Pratibimb		Marathi		
1995-2001	Aahat	Vipul	Hindi	SET	Season 1 Episode 22-23 Ruthless
2002-2005	Avantika	Anish Patwardhan	Marathi	Alpha TV Marathi	
2001-2005	Shriyut Gangadhar Tipre	Siddharth	Marathi	Alpha TV Marathi	
2007	Kalat Nakalat	Vishal Pandey	Marathi	Zee Marathi	
2007-2009	Asambhav	Dr. Viraj Samant/Shrirang Ranade	Marathi	Zee Marathi	
2009	Dehleez	Akash	Hindi	NDTV Imagine	
2009-2012	Kunku	Narsingh Killedar	Marathi	Zee Marathi	
2012	Nashib Navache	Anchor	Marathi	Saam TV	
2013	Tumchyasathi Kai Pan	Anchor	Marathi	ETV Marathi	
2014	Be Dune Daha	Swanand Dixit	Marathi	Star Pravah	
2015	2025 Jaane Kya Hoga Aage	Inder Joshi	Hindi	SET	
2016-2017	Saraswati	Kaka	Marathi	Colors Marathi	
2018	Grahan	Abhay Podhar	Marathi	Zee Marathi	
2020-2023	Sahkutumb Sahparivar	Suryakant	Marathi	Star Pravah	
2024–2025	Paaru	Sayaji Bhosale	Marathi	Zee Marathi	

=== Theatre in Marathi ===
- Chaar Choughi
- Zopi Gelela Jaga Zaala (2013)
- Tisre Badshah Hum (2020)

=== Web series ===
Year	Title	Role	Platform	Notes
2019	Gondya Ala Re	Lokmanya Tilak	ZEE5	
