= Tu Tithe Mee =

- Theatrical release poster
- Directed by: Sanjay Surkar
- Written by: S. N. Navare
- Screenplay by: S. N. Navare
- Produced by: Smita Talwalkar
- Starring: Mohan Joshi; Suhas Joshi
- Cinematography: Harish Joshi
- Edited by: Vishwas-Anil
- Music by: Anand Modak
- Production company: Asmita Chitra
- Release date: 22 April 1998
- Running time: 150 minutes
- Country: India
- Language: Marathi

Tu Tithe Mee (transl. Wherever you are, I'm there) is an Indian Marathi-language family drama film released on 22 April 1998. The film was produced by Smita Talwalkar and directed by Sanjay Surkar. It received the Best Feature Film in Marathi award at the 46th National Film Awards. The film was a commercial success and grossed ₹25 lakh (US$58,074.03) from Pune's Prabhat Cinema alone.

== Plot ==
As Nanasaheb Date steps into retirement, he looks back at a life filled with responsibilities and realizes he missed out on the simple joys along the way. Eager to catch up on these overlooked pleasures, he and his wife decide to explore life together after years of dedication to their duties.

However, their plans take an unexpected turn when their sons decide that Nanasaheb should live with the elder son, while the mother joins the younger one. This decision, though well-intentioned, leaves the couple feeling a bit sad and confused. They had hoped to spend their post-retirement days enjoying life side by side, and this separation wasn't part of the plan.

Now, Nanasaheb and his wife find themselves navigating a new chapter in their lives, dealing not only with physical distance but also the emotional challenges that come with changes in family dynamics.

== Cast ==
- Mohan Joshi as Nanasaheb Date
- Suhas Joshi as Usha Nanasaheb Date
- Smita Talwalkar as Kanchan; Old age home's owner
- Prashant Damle as Shyam Nanasaheb Date
- Kavita Lad as Kavita Shyam Date
- Sudhir Joshi as Nanasaheb's friend
- Sunil Barve as Prasad Nanasaheb Date
- Sharvani Pillai as Nanasaheb's daughter
- Sharmila Medhekar- Kulkarni as Prasad's wife
- Sharad Talwalkar as Guest appearance
- Shrikant Moghe as Guest appearance
- Chitra as Shyam's daughter
- Shriram Ranade

== Soundtrack ==
The music has been provided by Anand Modak.

- "Shodhit Gaav Aalo Swapnat Pahilele" - Ravindra Sathe
- "Aalo Kuthun Kothe Tudveet Paaywat" - Jayashri Shivram
- "Ujale Waat" - Ravindra Sathe
- "Jal Dahulale Bimb Harapale" - Ravindra Sathe
- "Shabdavina Othatale Kalale Mala" - Roopkumar Rathod
- "Saad Kokil Ghalato" - Jayashri Shivram
- "Yugayuganche Naate Apule" - Roopkumar Rathod
- "Ganyachya Bhendya Ie Antakshari" - Anuradha Marathe, Jaydip Dhamdhere Sripad Bhave, Suvarna Mategaonkar

=== Awards and accolades ===
- Winner of 2 National Awards 46th National Film Awards Best Feature Film in Marathi category
- Winner of 12 State Awards
- Winner of 5 Filmfare Awards
- Winner of 3 Screen Awards - Best Film, Best Actor, Best Actress

== Remake ==
The film was remade into Bengali Bangladesh as Amar Swapno Amar Songshar (2010).
