= Saatchya Aat Gharat =

- Theatrical release poster
- Directed by: Sanjay Surkar
- Written by: Sanjay Surkar; Nishikant Kamat
- Screenplay by: Sanjay Pawar
- Produced by: Smita Talwalkar
- Starring: Manav Kaul; Kartika Rane; Nishikant Kamath; Makarand Anaspure; Vibhawari Deshpande; Bharati Achrekar; Bharat Ganeshpure; Suhas Joshi; Reema Lagoo; Neena Kulkarni
- Narrated by: Reema Lagoo
- Cinematography: Sanjay Jadhav
- Music by: Rahul Ranade
- Distributed by: Asmita Chitra
- Release date: 31 May 2004
- Country: India
- Language: Marathi

Saatchya Aat Gharat (transl. At home within seven) is a 2004 Indian Marathi-language social drama film directed by Sanjay Surkar and produced by Smita Talwalkar. The film was released on 31 May 2004. It is partly based upon a 2002 incident in the University of Pune campus, where a student was raped by someone posing as a policeman. This was the debut movie for Kartika Rane in Marathi film Industry.

== Cast ==
The movie stars Kartika Rane, Manav Kaul, Nishikant Kamat, Benika Bisht, Mrunmayee Lagoo, Amruta Patki, Vibhavari Deshpande, Makarand Anaspure, Rakhi Sawant, Neena Kulkarni, Deepa Limaye, Suhas Joshi, Smita Talwalkar, Bharti Achrekar, Deepa Lagu, Prasanna Ketkar, Dr. Damle, Sharad Avasthi, Girish Oak, Nilu Phule, and Uday Tikekar.

Below are the details of main cast for Saatchya Aat Gharat.

- Kartika Rane as Madhura
- Vibhavari Deshpande as Ketaki
- Makarand Anaspure as Yuvraj
- Bharat Ganeshpure as Advocate
- Reema Lagoo as Narrator
- Bharati Achrekar as Piyu's Mother
- Suhas Joshi as Madhura's Aaji
- Neena Kulkarni as Madhura's Mother
- Deepa Limaye as Madhura's Sister Meera
- Uday Tikekar as Madhura's Father
- Manav Kaul as Venky
- Benika Bisht as Nandini
- Nishikant Kamat as Aniket
- Mrunmayee Lagoo as Tejal
- Girish Oak as Ketaki's Father
- Amruta Patki as Piyu
- Nilu Phule as Yuvraj's Grandfather
- Rakhi Sawant as item girl in "Hil Pori Hila"
- Prasann Ketkar as Inspector Parab
- Shriram Pendse as Aniket's Uncle

== Credits ==
The film's opening credits list the following filming locations:

- Symbiosys InfoPark College
- Deccan Gymkhana, Talwalkar Gym
- Law College
- Sams Garden
- Agarwal Bungalow
- Mokashi Bungalow
- V I T College Hostel
- Kavi Bar
- Film and Television Institute of India
- Durga Tekdi
- Pancard Club
- Chatushrungi
- Mahesh Sanskrutik Bhavan
- Chandivali Studio
- Raj Farms
- UTI Bank
- K K Bazaar
- Patankar Bungalow
- Bhave Bungalow

== Awards ==
=== Nominations ===
- 2005 Screen Awards: Best Film (Marathi)
- 2005 Screen Awards: Best Director (Marathi) – Sanjay Soorkar
- 2005 Screen Awards: Best Actress (Marathi) – Beneka

== Soundtrack ==
=== Tracklist ===
Following table shows list of tracks in the film.

| Track # | Song | Singer(s) | Duration |
|---|---|---|---|
| 1 | "Baghata Baghata" | | 1:41 |
| 2 | "Hill Hil Pori Hila" | | 4:47 |
| 3 | "Navi Navalai" | Amitabh Gokhale, Shivaranjani | 2:28 |
| 4 | "Tu An Mi" | | 5:44 |
