= Neelam Shirke =

Indian actress

- Born: 25 May 1980 (age 46); Bombay, Maharashtra
- Occupations: Film actress and Film producer
- Years active: 2004 – present
- Spouse: Multiple | Ashish Kulkarni (DIV)

Neelam Shirke is an actress of Marathi language television and Marathi cinema, known for her work in serials on Zee Marathi like Vadalvaat, Asambhav and Saheb, Bibi aani Mi. She also works in Marathi theatre.

== Career ==
She started her career with Marathi one-act plays since her college days, then turning to commercial plays and then gradually to television serials, weekly and daily soaps and then also worked in Marathi cinema. She earned popularity with the successful movie Pachadlela. She is particularly well known for her double character as the scheming vamp Sulekha who is the reincarnation of a prostitute Indumati in the Marathi serial Asambhav. She is also known for her role of Vishakha in Marathi serial Vadalvaat (2003–2007) and that of Bhakti in the Marathi Comedy serial Saheb Bibi Aani Me (2004–2006) where she played role of Bharat Jadhav's wife. She also portrayed an important role of Shivaji's queen Soirabai in Raja Shivchhatrapati and a positive lead role in Charchaughi serial on Star Pravah. She also appeared in the films Zhak Marli Baiko Keli and Chingi, which earned her critical acclaim.

== Filmography ==
- Gadbad Gondhal (2018)
- Tendulkar Out (2013)
- Dhating Dhingana (2013)
- Pratisaad - The Response (2010)
- Zhak Marli Bayko Keli (2009)
- Chingi (2009)
- Ekda Kay Zale Bayko Udali Bhurr (2008)
- Kshan (2006)
- Pachadlela (2004)

== Television ==
- Saheb Bibi aani Mi
- Vadalvaat
- Asambhav
- Raja Shivchhatrapati
- Chaar Choughi
- Koparkhali
- Hasa Chakat Fu
- Namaskar Mandali
- Advocate Shalini
- Swamini

== Awards ==
=== Zee Marathi Utsav Natyancha Awards ===
- 2004: Best Vamp, Role: Vishakha (Vadalvaat)
- 2005: Best Supporting Actress, Role: Vishakha (Vadalvaat)
- 2007: Best Vamp, Role: Sulekha (Asambhav)
- 2008: Best Vamp, Role: Sulekha (Asambhav)
- 2009: Best Vamp, Role: Sulekha (Asambhav)
