= Talwalkars =

Indian health club chain

Talwalkar
- Company type: Public Company
- Traded as: BSE: 533200; NSE: TALWALKARS
- Genre: Fitness- Health -Aerobics - Cardio
- Founded: 1932
- Founder: Madhukar Talwalkar
- Headquarters: Mumbai, India
- Key people: Madhukar Talwalkar; Prashant Talwalkar; Vinayak Ratnakar Gawande; Harsha Ramdas Bhatkal; Anant Ratnakar Gawande; Girish Talwalkar

Talwalkars Health Clubs Ltd, popularly known as Talwalkars, was India's largest chain of health clubs. At its peak it had 152 Health Clubs across 80 cities in India on a consolidated basis, with over 200,000 members. In 2020 bankruptcy proceedings were issued against the company for defaulting on loan payments.

== History ==
Established in 1932, by late Mr. Vishnupant Talwalkar, his eldest son - Madhukar Talwalkar, further continued under the name "Talwalkars Gymnasium" in Bandra, Mumbai in 1962. In March 2014, UK based David Lloyd Leisure group begun talks with the management of Talwalkars to acquire around 20 percent stake in the company. In June 2015, Talwalkars Better Value Fitness and David Lloyd announced their intention to create a joint venture (JV) establishing and managing leisure clubs in India.
