= He Gajavadan =

"sarvangi"

Song by Numerous artists
- Language: hindi
- Composer: sarvangi dhyani
- Lyricist: C.T.Khānōlkar

Music video
- He Gajavadan on YouTube

He Gajavadan is a song written in Marathi concept and music by Salil Kulkarni made on Lord Ganesh. This song is sung by 90 artists in Marathi industry.

== Introduction ==
The He Gajavadan has been sung by 90 established singers. It is a very melodious composition which aims to the lord Ganesh reconcile every Marathi-speaking individual to the beauty of the language. It was originally written by C.T.Khānōlkar to invoke Gaɳeɕ in one of his plays.

== Singers ==
There are 90 accomplished singers/artists have come together for a single song. From 7-year-old kids to senior singer like Suresh Wadkar, each singer has lent his or her own special style and presence to make this song a collage of melodious voices.

Complete list of singers in order of singing with lyrics and instruments is as follows:

1. हे गजवदन - Suresh Wadkar. GUITARS – Manoj Pandya and Ritesh Ohol
2. हे गजवदन वक्रतुंड महाकाय — Suresh Wadkar
3. हे गजवदन वक्रतुंड महाकाय — Anand Bhate, Sanjeev Abhyankar, Shounak Abhisheki
4. हे गजवदन वक्रतुंड महाकाय — Aparna Sant, Suvarna Mategaonkar, Vibhavari Apte-Joshi
5. दशावतारी आम्ही धरतो तुमचेच पाय — Anuja Zokarkar, Anuradha Kuber, Manjusha Patil, Meghana Sardar
6. दशावतारी आम्ही धरतो तुमचेच पाय- Bela Shende, Mahesh Kale, Savani Shende
7. हे गजवदन वक्रतुंड महाकाय — Avdhoot Gupte, Rahul Deshpande, Vaishali Samant
8. हे गजवदन वक्रतुंड महाकाय — Aditya Athalye, Saleel Kulkarni, Sandeep Khare, Ritesh Ohol
9. हे गजवदन वक्रतुंड महाकाय — Jasraj Joshi, Ketaki Mategaonkar, Nihira Joshi
10. सुखकर्ता दुखहर्ता वार्ता विघ्नाची, नुरवी पुरवी प्रेम कृपा जयाची: Adarsha Shinde, Juilee Joglekar, Nandesh Umap
11. सर्वांगी सुंदर उटी शेंदुराची, सर्वांगी सुंदर उटी शेंदुराची जयदेव : Nilesh Mohrir, Pankaj Padghan, Sayali Pankaj
12. सर्वांगी सुंदर उटी शेंदुराची, चंदनाची उटी, कुमकुम केशरा– Jitendra Abhyankar, Madhura Datar, Narendra Bhide, Nitin Joshi, Tushar Pandit
13. हिरेजडित मुकुट, शोभतो बरा, रुणझुणती नूपुरे, चरणी घागरिया – Anand Dabre, Avdhoot Wadkar, Mandar Wadkar, Pramod Chandorkar & Vijay Dayal
14. Music Sarod : Sarang Kulkarni Sitar : Prasad Gondkar
15. Padhant : Aboli Abhyankar-Thatte, Rujuta Soman, Sharvaree Jamenis
16. Flute : Amar Oak
17. स्तववतो तुम्हा सुंकट आमचे विलयाला जावो: Aarya Ambekar, Kartiki Gaikwad, Mugdha Vaishampayan, Prathamesh Laghate, Rohit Raut
18. स्तववतो तुम्हा सुंकट आमचे विलयाला जावो: Aanandi Joshi, Kirti Killedar, Priyanka Barve, Savani Ravindra
19. स्तववतो तुम्हा सुंकट आमचे विलयाला जावो: Amruta Natu, Hrishikesh Ranade, Neha Rajpal, Prajakta Ranade
20. हे गजवदन वक्रतुंड महाकाय — Abhijit Kosambi, Aniruddha Joshi, Mangesh Borgaonkar, Urmila Dhangar, Vishwajeet Borwankar
21. हे गजवदन वक्रतुंड महाकाय– Mithilesh Patankar, Rishikesh Kamerkar & Swapnil Bandodkar
22. हे गजवदन वक्रतुंड महाकाय –: Jaanvee Prabhu Arora, Kaushal Inamdar, Milind Ingale, Milind Joshi
23. लंबोदर पीतांबर, फणिवरबंधना, सरळ सोंड, वक्रतुंड त्रिनयना — Amar Oak, Archis Lele, Krishna Ghotkar, Nilesh Parab & Satyajeet Prabhu
24. दास रामाचा, वाट पाहे सदना, संकटी पावावे, निर्वाणी रक्षावे, सुरवरवंदना — Ajit Vispute, Chaitanya Kulkarni, Prachi Marathe, Rutika Chaubal, Saee Tembhekar, Swarada Godbole
25. जय देव जय देव, जय मंगलमूर्ती, दर्शनमात्रे मनकामना पुरती, जयदेव जयदेव : Abhay Amar Oak, Abhed Shounak Abhisheki, Anannya Saleel Kulkarni, Ashutosh Anand Bhate, Devaki Ghanshyam Ranade, Rashmi Sanjeev Abhyankar, Shubhankar Saleel Kulkarni, Vidit Mithilesh Patankar.

and Chorus.

== Album release ==
The song was released on 18 August 2016

== Post release ==
The song was well accepted across communities and was well appreciated
