= MFK Award for Favourite Female Playback Singer =

Indian film award

Maharashtracha Favourite Kon? for Favourite Female Playback Singer
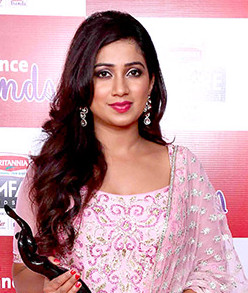
- The 2023 recipient: Shreya Ghoshal for "Sukh Kalale" from Ved
- Awarded for: Best Performance by a Playback Singer Female
- Country: India
- Presented by: Zee Talkies
- First award: Bela Shende, for "Wajle Ki Baara" from Natarang (2010)
- Currently held by: Shreya Ghosal, for "Sukh Kalale" from Ved (2023)

Maharashtracha Favourite Kon? Award for Favourite Female Playback Singer is given by Zee Talkies as part of its annual Maharashtracha Favourite Kon? ceremony for Marathi films. Although the award ceremony was established in 2009, the category for best female playback singer was introduced in 2010.

== Superlatives ==
| Superlatives | Music director | Record |
|---|---|---|
| Most awards | Shreya Ghoshal | 3 |
| Most nominations | Bela Shende | 9 |
| Most nominations | Anandi Joshi | 8 |
| Most nominations without ever winning | Shalmali Kholgade; Vaishali Mhade | 3 |
| Most nominations in a single year | Anandi Joshi (2016) | 3 |
| Most consecutive year nominations | Anandi Joshi (2015-2021) | 6 |

== Winners and nominees ==
| Year | Photos of winners | Actor | Song | Film | Ref. |
|---|---|---|---|---|---|
| 2010 | | Bela Shende † | Wajle Ki Bara | Natarang | |
| 2010 | | Bela Shende | Apsara Aali | Natarang | |
| 2010 | | Kalpana | Galit Gondhal | Gallit Gondhal, Dillit Mujra | |
| 2011 | | Bela Shende † | Aaj Mhare Ghar Pavana | Balgandharva | |
| 2011 | | Devki Pandit | Itkech Mala Jatana | Mee Sindhutai Sapkal | |
| 2011 | | Urmila Dhangar | Amhi Nahi Ja | Ideachi Kalpana | |
| 2012 | | Urmila Dhangar † | Welcome Ho Raya Welcome | Deool | |
| 2012 | | Rajashree Patak | Kuthe Paath Phiravun | Kaksparsh | |
| 2012 | | Hamsika Iyer | Mann Chimb Pavasali | Ajintha | |
| 2013 | | Sayali Pankaj † | Tik Tik Vajate Dokyaat | Duniyadari | |
| 2013 | | Yogita Godbole | Thodi Taiyyari | Ekulti Ek | |
| 2013 | | Bela Shende | Olya Sanjveli | Premachi Goshta | |
| 2013 | | Shalmali Kholgade | Jag Sare Badale | Pune 52 | |
| 2013 | | Usha Uttup | Life Is Kho | Kho Kho | |
| 2014 | | Ketaki Mategaonkar † | Mala Ved Laagale | Timepass | |
| 2015 | | Aanandi Joshi † | Kiti Sangaychay Mala | Double Seat | |
| 2015 | | Shreya Ghoshal | Mohini | Double Seat | |
| 2015 | | Shalmali Kholgade | Fresh | Happy Journey | |
| 2015 | | Janhavi Prabhu Arora | Savar Re | Mitwaa | |
| 2015 | | Apeksha Dandekar | Madan Pichkari | Timepass 2 | |
| 2015 | | Ketaki Mategaonkar | Sunya Sunya | Timepass 2 | |
| 2016 | | Shreya Ghoshal † | Aata Ga Baya Ka Bavarla | Sairat | |
| 2016 | | Chinmayi Sripada | Sairat Zaala Ji | Sairat | |
| 2016 | | Aanandi Joshi | Sur Niragas Ho | Katyar Kaljat Ghusali | |
| 2016 | | Aanandi Joshi | Dhagadhaga | Dagdi Chawl | |
| 2016 | | Aanandi Joshi | Band Baja Baraat | Mumbai Pune Mumbai 2 | |
| 2016 | | Bela Shende | Sath De Tu Mala | Mumbai Pune Mumbai 2 | |
| 2017 | | Aarya Ambekar † | Hrudayat Vaje Something | Ti Saddhya Kay Karte | |
| 2017 | | Aarya Ambekar | Jara Jara | Ti Saddhya Kay Karte | |
| 2017 | | Priyanka Chopra | Baba | Ventilator | |
| 2017 | | Sunidhi Chauhan | Kutha Kutha Jayacha Honeymoonla | Boyz | |
| 2017 | | Aanandi Joshi | Aga Aik Na | Muramba | |
| 2017 | | Vaishali Samant, Sonu Kakkar | Krishna Janmala | Kanha | |
| 2018 | | Vaishali Samant † | Khandala Ghat | Ye Re Ye Re Paisa | |
| 2018 | | Janhvi Prabhu Arora | Ye Re Ye Re Paisa | Ye Re Ye Re Paisa | |
| 2018 | | Shreya Ghoshal, Sadhana Sargam | Houn Jau Dya | Bucket List | |
| 2018 | | Ankita Joshi, Aanandi Joshi | Hey Darvayta | Naal | |
| 2018 | | Vaishali Mhade | Un Un | Mulshi Pattern | |
| 2018 | | Vaishali Mhade | Veglya Vata | Aamhi Doghi | |
| 2019 | | Ronkini Gupta † | Tula Japnar Aahe | Khari Biscuit | |
| 2019 | | Aanandi Joshi | Tuzi Athavan | Miss U Mister | |
| 2019 | | Bela Shende | Aaichaan Ra | Rampaat | |
| 2019 | | Bela Shende | Akhiyan Yeh Dekho Kanha | Fatteshikast | |
| 2019 | | Priyanka Barve | Waata Waata Waata Ga | Anandi Gopal | |
| 2021 | | Aarya Ambekar † | Hrudayat Vaje Something | Ti Saddhya Kay Karte | |
| 2021 | | Bela Shende | Wajle Ki Baara | Natarang | |
| 2021 | | Bela Shende | Aaj Mhare Ghar Pavana | Balgandharva | |
| 2021 | | Urmila Dhangar | Welcome Ho Raya Welcome | Deool | |
| 2021 | | Sayali Pankaj | Tik Tik Vajate Dokyaat | Duniyadari | |
| 2021 | | Ketaki Mategaonkar | Mala Ved Laagale | Timepass | |
| 2021 | | Aanandi Joshi | Kiti Sangaichay Mala | Double Seat | |
| 2021 | | Shreya Ghoshal | Aatach Baya Ka Baavarla | Sairat | |
| 2021 | | Vaishali Samant | Khandala Ghat | Ye Re Ye Re Paisa | |
| 2021 | | Ronkini Gupta | Tula Japnar Aahe | Khari Biscuit | |
| 2022 | | Shreya Ghoshal † | Chandra | Chandramukhi | |
| 2022 | | Sampada Mane | Kelewali | Pandu | |
| 2022 | | Vaishali Samant | Bhurum Bhurum | Pandu | |
| 2022 | | Vaishali Samant | Waghachi Darkali | Timepass 3 | |
| 2022 | | Shalmali Kholgade | Cold Drink | Timepass 3 | |
| 2022 | | Vaishali Mhade | Gar Gar Bhingri | De Dhakka 2 | |
| 2022 | | Shamika Bhide | De Punha Dhakka | De Dhakka 2 | |
| 2023 | | Shreya Ghoshal † | Sukh Kalale | Ved | |
| 2023 | | Shreya Ghoshal | Baharla Ha Madhumas | Maharashtra Shahir | |
| 2023 | | Savani Ravindra | Mangalagaur | Baipan Bhaari Deva | |
| 2023 | | Aarya Ambekar | Kevdyach Paan Tu | Sarla Ek Koti | |
| 2023 | | Vaishali Samant, Mugdha Karhade | Marathi Pori | Jhimma 2 | |
