= Wajle Ki Bara =

2010 Marathi song from the film Natarang

Song by Bela Shende

from the album Natarang
- Language: Marathi
- Released: 2010
- Genre: Filmi; lavani
- Length: 6:38
- Label: Zee Music Company
- Composer: Ajay-Atul
- Lyricist: Guru Thakur

Music videos
- "Wajle Ki Bara" on YouTube

"Wajle Ki Bara" (Marathi: वाजले की बारा; transl. It has struck twelve), also transliterated as "Vajle Ki Bara" and sometimes identified by its opening line "Mala Jau Dya Na Ghari", is a Marathi-language song from the 2010 Indian drama film Natarang, directed by Ravi Jadhav. The song was composed by the duo Ajay–Atul, written by Guru Thakur, and sung by Bela Shende with chorus vocals. The song is picturised on actress Amruta Khanvilkar and is widely regarded, alongside "Apsara Aali" from the same film, as one of the most popular modern lavani songs in Marathi cinema.

== Background and composition ==
"Wajle Ki Bara" was composed by Ajay–Atul with lyrics by Guru Thakur. The title, meaning "It Has Struck Twelve [Midnight]", forms the song's refrain, while the composition is based on the traditional lavani style and accompanied by the dholki.

Dancer Aditi Bhagwat was initially considered to perform the song before Amruta Khanvilkar was cast a day before filming began. The song was filmed over two nights. Bhagwat later said she did not regret missing the opportunity, adding that she might otherwise have spent her entire career being identified only with "Wajle Ki Bara", while Khanvilkar stated that she was paid ₹30,000 (equivalent to ₹75,000 or US$780 in 2023) for the sequence and credited the song with advancing her career, saying it gave her opportunities to perform even in places without electricity.

== Music video and picturisation ==
The song features Amruta Khanvilkar in a special appearance in Natarang, performing a traditional lavani dance sequence. She performs a traditional lavani dance, dressed in a yellow kasta saree and pink blouse with traditional pearl jewellery and ghungroo. Retrospective coverage by Sakal described the song as a breakthrough in Khanvilkar's career, crediting it with bringing widespread recognition to her dancing despite having no formal dance training.

== Reception ==
"Wajle Ki Bara" was well received upon its release and emerged as one of the standout songs from Natarang. The song contributed to the commercial success of the film's soundtrack, while Bela Shende's rendition received positive recognition and became closely associated with the resurgence of lavani in mainstream Marathi cinema.

== Accolades ==
| Year | Award | Nominee | Category | Result |
|---|---|---|---|---|
| 2011 | Zee Chitra Gaurav Puraskar | Bela Shende | Best Female Playback Singer | Won |
| 2011 | Maharashtracha Favourite Kon? | Ajay-Atul | Favourite Song | Won |
| 2011 | Maharashtracha Favourite Kon? | Bela Shende | Favourite Female Playback Singer | Won |
| 2021 | Maharashtracha Favourite Kon? | Bela Shende | Favourite Female Playback Singer | Nominated |
| 2021 | Maharashtracha Favourite Kon? | Ajay-Atul | Favourite Song | Nominated |

== Legacy ==
The song has remained popular since its release and has been performed on shows, including India's Got Talent and Indian Idol. In 2025, a performance of the song by Italian contestants Giulia, Laura and Silvia on India's Got Talent season 11 went viral online and was praised by the judges. The Times of India later included the song in a list of regional Indian songs that have gained wider international recognition. The song has also been used in viral dance videos on social media, including a 2025 performance by Mandara Gowda at a college cultural festival in Bengaluru that received significant online attention.
