= Maharashtra State Film Award for Best Female Playback Singer =

Indian film award

Maharashtra State Film Awards for Best Female Playback Singer
- Awarded for: Best Female Playback Singer
- Country: India
- Presented by: Government of Maharashtra
- First award: Asha Bhosle, Manini (1962)

The Maharashtra State Film Award for Best Playback Singer Female is an honour established in 1962, and presented at the Maharashtra State Film Awards for best female playback singer in Marathi cinema.

The first recipient was Asha Bhosle, who was honoured at the 1st Maharashtra State Film Awards in 1962 for her rendition from the movie Manini. As of 2024, The female playback singer who won the most awards is Asha Bhosle with seventeen wins, followed by Anuradha Paudwal with nine wins. Devaki Pandit has won the award four times and Sadhana Sargam thrice. Lata Mangeshkar Suman Kalyanpur, Uttara Kelkar, Pushpa Pagdhare, and Jayshree Shivram have each won it twice.

== Winners ==
Year	Photos of Winners	Recipient	Song	Film	Ref
1962		Asha Bhosle	"Are Khopya Madhi Khopa"	Manini	
1963		Asha Bhosle	"Akele Hum Toh Ghabraye"	Rangalya Ratri Asha	
1964		Suman Kalyanpur	"Shabd Shabd Julavuni"	Sukhachi Savli	
1965		Suman Kalyanpur	"Wadacha Kathi"	Vavtal	
1966		Lata Mangeshkar	"Airaneechya Deva Tula"	Sadhi Mansa	
1966		Sulochana Chavan	"Tujhya Usala Lagal Kolha"	Malhari Martand	
1967		Asha Bhosle	"Nako Re Bolus Majhyashi"	Santh Wahate Krushnamai	
1968		Asha Bhosle	"Mala He Datta Guru Disle"	Aamhi Jato Amuchya Gava	
1969		Asha Bhosle	"Tujhi Priti Aaj Kashi"	Aparadh	
1970		Asha Bhosle	"Dhundi Kalyanna"	Dhakti Bahin	
1971		Asha Bhosle	"Malmali Tarunya Maze"	Gharkul	
1972-73		Usha Mangeshkar	"Kal Ratila Sapan Padla"	Ekta Jeev Sadashiv	
1974		Asha Bhosle	"Kambar Lachakali"	Sugandhi Katta	
1975	–	Pushpa Pagdhare	"Bai Hya Pavhnyala"	Jyotibacha Navas	
1976		Asha Bhosle	"Kajal Ratina Odhun Nela"	Ha Khel Sawalyancha	
1977		Asha Bhosle	"Sadhi Bholi Meera"	Bala Gau Kashi Angai	
1978		Lata Mangeshkar	"Me Raat Takali"	Jait Re Jait	
1979	–	Uttara Kelkar	"Ekach Hota Shyam Savala"	Haldi Kunku	
1980	–	Pushpa Pagdhare	"Rusala Ka Ho Manmohana"	Aayatya Bilawar Nagoba	
1981		Anuradha Paudwal	"Kalya Matit Matit"	Are Sansar Sansar	
1982		Anuradha Paudwal	"Vishawalli Asuni Bhavti"	Ek Daav Bhutacha	
1983	–	Uttara Kelkar	"Mansa Daiv Kuna Kalale"	Sansar Pakhrancha	
1984		Asha Bhosle	"Mage Ubha Mangesh, Pudhe Ubha Mangesh"	Mahananda	
1985		Devaki Pandit	"Chunari Nako Odhu"	Ardhangi	
1986		Asha Bhosle	"Ekach Hya Janmi Janu"	Pudhcha Paool	
1987		Anuradha Paudwal	"Mi Aale Nighale"	Gammat Jammat	
1988		Asha Bhosle	"Saavaj Gavana"	Bandiwan Mi Ya Sansari	
1989		Asha Bhosle	"Manat Tujhe Manogat"	Kalat Nakalat	
1990		Anuradha Paudwal	"Ratra Aahe Reshmachi"	Aamchyasarkhe Aamhich	
1991		Asha Bhosle	"Ek Zoka"	Chaukat Raja	
1992		Asha Bhosle	"Na Kalata Ase Unn"; "Mee Geet Gatana Tula"	Aapli Mansa; Ek Hota Vidushak	
1993		Anuradha Paudwal	"Chal Yena Mithit Ghena"	Aikava Te Navalach	
1994	–	Jayshree Shivram	"Jaai Juicha Gandha Matila"	Mukta	
1995		Anjali Marathe	"Bhui Bhegalali Khol"	Doghi	
1996	–	Jayshree Shivram	"Raosaheb"	Raosaheb	
1997		Anuradha Paudwal	"Moharle Mi Sajna"	Paij Lagnachi	
1998	–	Jayshree Shivram	"Saad Kokil Ghalto"	Tu Tithe Mee	
1999		Kavita Krishnamurthy	"Jhep Ghetali Akashi"	Sawai Hawaldar	
2000		Asha Bhosle	"Majhya Sonulya"	Raju	
2001		Devaki Pandit	"Devki Gaate Angaai"	Devki	
2002	–	Yogita Godbole	"Ek Kajvyachi Bheek"	Krishnakathchi Tara	
2003		Sadhana Sargam	"Daiva Chakra Phirle"	Suryoday	
2004		Sadhana Sargam	"Mi Tujhich Re"	Mi Tujhich Re	
2005		Sadhana Sargam	"Sanjh Jhali Tari"	Sarivar Sari	
2006		Devaki Pandit	"Ja Re Ja Leta Ja"	Savlee	
2007		Arati Ankalikar Tikekar	"Ugavali Shukrachi Chandani"	De Dhakka	
2008	–	Dr. Supriya Gadekar	"Gho Mala Asla Hava"	Gho Mala Asla Hava	
2009	–	Urmila Dhangar	"Aai Ambe Jagdambe"	Durga Mhantyat Mala	
2010		Bela Shende	"Apsara Aali"	Natarang	
2011		Devaki Pandit	"Pahilya Priticha Gandh"	Arjun	
2012	–	Hamsika Iyer	"Man Chimb Pavsali"	Ajintha	
2013		Mahalakshmi Iyer	"Daatale Reshmi Dhuke"	Timepass	
2014		Bela Shende	"Visruni Kshana"	Guru Pournima	
2015		Janhavi Prabhu Arora	"Saavar Re Mana"	Mitwaa	
2016	–	Mugdha Hasabnis	"Kalokhacha"	Ubuntu	
2017	–	Savani Shende	"Savare Rang Main"	Asehi Ekada Vhave	
2018		Priyanka Barve	"Kalokhachya Watevarti"	Bandishala	
2019	–	Madhura Kumbhar	"Jagana He Nyaar Zala"	Hirkani	
2020	–	Prachi Rege	"Majhya Godabaila Jo Jo Jo"	Godakaath	
2021		Aanandi Joshi	"Man Zhale Bavare"	Rangiley Funter	
2022		Aarya Ambekar	"Bai Ga"	Chandramukhi	
2022	–	Amita Ghugari	"Kaina"	Soyrik	
2023	–	Rucha Bondre	"Bharajari Ga Pitambara"	Shyamchi Aai	
2024	–	Rajeshwari Pawar	"Zoka"	Sajana	

== Multiple wins ==
Individuals with two or more Best Female Playback Singer awards:

Wins	Recipients
17	Asha Bhosle
6	Anuradha Paudwal
4	Devaki Pandit
3	Sadhana Sargam; Jayshree Shivram
2	Lata Mangeshkar; Suman Kalyanpur; Bela Shende; Uttara Kelkar; Pushpa Pagdhare

== See also ==
- Maharashtra State Film Awards
- Maharashtra State Film Award for Best Male Playback Singer
