= Zee Chitra Gaurav Puraskar for Best Playback Singer – Female =

Zee Chitra Gaurav Puraskar for Best Female Playback Singer
- Awarded for: Best Performance by a Female Playback Singer
- Country: India
- Presented by: Zee Marathi
- First award: Sadhna Sargam , "kshitijawaril tara" Jodidaar
- Currently held by: Vaishali Mhade, "Madanmanjiri"; Phullwanti (2025)

The Zee Chitra Gaurav Puraskar for Best Playback Singer - Female is chosen by the jury of Zee Marathi as part of its annual award ceremony for Marathi films, to recognise a female playback singer. Following its inception in 2009.

== Winners and nominees ==
=== 2000s ===
Year	Photos of winners	Singer	Song	Movie
2000		Sadhana Sargam	Kshitijavaril Tara	Jodidaar
2000		Kavita Krishnamurthy	Bindhaast Ghe Shwaas	Bindhaast
2000		Hema Sardesai	Bindhaast Ghe Shwaas	Bindhaast
2000		Bela Sulakhe	Bindhaast Ghe Shwaas	Bindhaast
2001	–	Yogita Barve	Jeevan He Saare	Mrugjal
2001	–	Anuradha Paudwal	Majha Sonyacha Sansar	Chimani Pakhar
2001	–	Ranjana Joglekar, Prathima Rao	Khatarnak Ratra Aahe	Khatarnak
2002		Sadhana Sargam	Hee Preet Aaj Bole	Aadhar
2005		Sadhana Sargam	Saanjh Jhali Tari	Sarivar Sari
2005		Anuradha Paudwal	Vedshastramaji	Navra Maza Navsacha
2005		Vaishali Samant	Bhootana Pachhadla	Pachhadlela
2006		Sadhana Sargam	Dis Chaar Zale Man	Aai Shappath
2006		Vaishali Samant	Kombadi Palali	Jatra
2006		Dipali Nag	Chanana Bijua Baje Re	Dombivli Fast
2007		Sadhana Sargam	Aevdhese Aabhal	Aevdhese Aabhal
2007		Sadhana Sargam	Tula Shodhta Shodhta	Anandache Jhaad
2007		Vaishali Samant	Hi Gulabi Hawa	Golmaal
2008		Neha Rajpal	Phulnara Mausam Tu	Mukkam Post London
2008		Vaishali Samant	Rani Majhya Malyamandi	Tula Shikwin Changlach Dhada
2008		Priti Kamath	Chimb Bhijlele	Bandh Premache
2009		Arati Ankalikar Tikekar	Ugavali Shukrachi Chandani	De Dhakka
2009		Anjali Marathe	Umbarachya Banakhali	Marmbandh
2009		Supriya Gadekar	Gho Mala Asla Hava	Gho Mala Asla Hava
2010		Bela Shende	Wajle Ki Bara	Natarang
2010		Shreya Ghoshal	Haluvaar Jaglya Hya	Anandi Anand
2010		Anagha Domse, Janhavi Arora	Yenar Yenar	Nau Mahine Nau Divas

=== 2010s ===
Year	Photos of winners	Singer	Song	Movie
2011		Shreya Ghoshal	Ha Natyancha Khel	Aarambh
2011		Bela Shende	Ka Kalena	Mumbai-Pune-Mumbai
2011		Janhavi Arora	Tujhya Girnicha	Lalbaug Parel
2012		Devaki Pandit	Pahilya Priticha Gandh	Arjun
2012		Bela Shende	Divas Kovale	Chinu
2012		Sampada Hire	Pardarshi Raat Aahe	Pratibimb
2013		Rajashri Pathak	Kuthe Path Firvuni	Kaksparsh
2013		Hamsika Iyer	Mann Chimb Pavsali	Ajintha
2013		Urmila Dhangar, Kalyani Salunkhe	Jagjethi	Ajintha
2014		Apeksha Dandekar	Mala Vatati	Yellow
2014		Bela Shende	Olya Sanjveli	Premachi Goshta
2014		Sayali Pankaj	Tik Tik Vajate	Duniyadari
2014		Janhavi Arora, Kalpana Shah	Na Kale Kadhi	Jai Maharashtra Dhaba Bhatinda
2015		Neha Rajpal	Kaakan	Kaakan
2015		Priyanka Barve	Ushashi Gandh	Kondan
2015		Bela Shende	Baware Prem He	Baware Prem He
2015		Madhura Datar	Loot Liyo	Rama Madhav
2015		Kirti Killedar	Mani Achanak	Dusari Goshta
2016		Aanandi Joshi	Kiti Sangaychay	Double Seat
2016		Vibhavari Apte Joshi	Natyas Naav Apulya	Natsamrat
2016		Shreya Ghoshal	Adhir Man Jhale	Nilkanth Master
2016		Janhavi Arora	Savar Re Mana	Mitwaa
2016		Aanandi Joshi	Dhaga Dhaga	Dagadi Chawl
2017		Shreya Ghoshal	Aatach Baya Ka Bavarla	Sairat
2017		Neha Rajpal	Oli Ti Maati	Photocopy
2017		Savani Ravindra	Magan Masta	One Way Ticket
2018		Rupali Moghe	Marugelara	Hampi
2018		Shreya Ghoshal	Roj Roj Navyane	Deva
2018		Aarya Ambekar	Hrudayat Vaje Something	Ti Saddhya Kay Karte
2018		Mithila Palkar	Muramba	Muramba
2018		Aanandi Joshi	Vaate Vari	Hrudayantar
2019	–	Sayali Khare	Dis Yeti	Nude
2019	–	Vaishali Samant	Khandala Ghat	Ye Re Ye Re Paisa
2019	–	Sharayu Date	Indhradhanu	Ani... Dr. Kashinath Ghanekar
2020		Aanandi Joshi	Anand Ghan	Anandi Gopal
2020		Ketaki Mategaonkar, Sharayu Date	Rang Maliyela	Anandi Gopal
2020		Ronkini Gupta	Tula Japnar Aahe	Khari Biscuit

=== 2020s ===
Year	Photos of winners	Singer	Song	Movie
2021		Not Awarded		
2022		Shreya Ghoshal	Jeev Rangla	Jogwa
2022		No other nominees		
2023		Shreya Ghoshal	Chandra	Chandramukhi
2023		Aarya Ambekar	Bai Ga	Chandramukhi
2023		Shreya Ghoshal	Sukh Kalale	Ved
2023		Priyanka Barve	Bindiya Le Gayi	Me Vasantrao
2023		Mugdha Karhade	Alahida Parawa	Ananya
2024	–	Nandini Srikar	Kshan Kalche	Unaad
2024	–	Shreya Ghoshal	Baharla Ha Madhumas	Maharashtra Shahir
2024	–	Vaishali Samant	Punha Jhimma	Jhimma 2
2024	–	Savani Ravindra	Mangalagaur	Baipan Bhaari Deva
2025		Vaishali Mhade	Madanmanjiri	Phullwanti
2025		Aarya Ambekar	Phullwanti - Title Track	Phullwanti
2025		Cyli Khare	Vasarachi Aai	Gharat Ganpati
2025		Deepti Mate	–	Amaltash

== Superlatives ==
=== Multiple wins ===
Individuals with two or more Best Singer Female awards:

Wins	Singer
5	Sadhana Sargam
4	Shreya Ghoshal
2	Neha Rajpal; Aanandi Joshi

=== Multiple Nominations ===
Nominations	Singer
8	Shreya Ghoshal
6	Sadhana Sargam; Vaishali Samant
5	Bela Shende
4	Aanandi Joshi; Janhavi Prabhu Arora
