= Apsara Aali =

2010 Marathi song from the film Natarang

- Official song cover

Song by Bela Shende (Backing vocals by Ajay-Atul)

from the album Natarang
- Language: Marathi
- Released: 2010
- Genre: Filmi; lavani
- Length: 4:10
- Label: Zee Music Company
- Composer: Ajay-Atul
- Lyricist: Guru Thakur

Music videos
- "Apsara Aali" on YouTube

"Apsara Aali" (Marathi: अप्सरा आली; transl. The nymph has descended) is a Marathi-language song from the 2010 Indian drama film Natarang, directed by Ravi Jadhav. The song is composed by Ajay-Atul, features lyrics by Guru Thakur and vocals by Bela Shende. It gained immense popularity and was performed by Sonalee Kulkarni in the film.

== Development ==
"Apsara Aali" is arranged and programmed by Ajay-Atul. The song was choreographed by Phulwa Khamkar, who made the dance a combination of folk and classical. Ajay-Atul use a rhythm called Keherwa, which has 8 beats in a cycle, and they organize it in four different levels of complexity: 4, 8, 16, and 24 beats within the same cycle.

== Music video ==
The music video features Sonalee Kulkarni as Nayana dancing on a stage. She is accompanied by a troupe of dancers. For the song, she wears a heavy jewellery, nauvari saree, and sings directly to audience.

== Reception ==
The song became popular and topped the charts. The official music video had crossed over 90 million views on YouTube.

Ruchir Pathak of MouthShut.com wrote "It spread the magic and fit perfectly for nautanki." While audiences enjoyed the Lāvaṇī dance sequences, traditional Lāvaṇī performers and experts criticized them for having a more item song-like feel. Critics particularly pointed out Sonalee Kulkarni's provocative attire, which they argued deviates from the conservative traditional Lāvaṇī costume.

== Accolades ==
Year	Award	Nominee	Category	Result
2010	Maharashtra State Film Awards	Bela Shende	Best Female Playback Singer	Won
2010	Maharashtra State Film Awards	Guru Thakur	Best Lyricist	Nominated
2010	Maharashtra State Film Awards	Phulwa Khamkar	Best Choreographer	Won
2010	Sanskruti Kaladarpan	Bela Shende	Best Singer – Female	Won
2010	Sanskruti Kaladarpan	Ajay-Atul	Best Music Director	Won
2010	Maharashtra Times Sanman Awards	Bela Shende	Best Female Playback Singer	Won
2010	Maharashtra Times Sanman Awards	Ajay-Atul	Best Music Director	Won
2011	Zee Chitra Gaurav Puraskar	Phulwa Khamkar	Best Choreographer	Won
2011	V. Shantaram Puraskar	Ajay-Atul	Best Music Direction	Won
2011	V. Shantaram Puraskar	Phulwa Khamkar	Best Choreography	Won
2011	BIG FM Music Awards	Ajay-Atul	Best Music Director	Won
2011	BIG FM Music Awards	Bela Shende	Best Female Playback Singer	Won
2011	BIG FM Music Awards	Ajay-Atul & Guru Thakur	Best Song of the Year	Won
