= Kuni Mulgi Deta Ka Mulgi =

- Directed by: Ashok Karlekar
- Screenplay by: Rugved Deshpandey; Ashok Karlekar
- Story by: Da Sachin Sharma
- Produced by: Da Sachin Sharma, Pankaj Vishwakarma, Sushil Jain
- Starring: Ashutosh Kulkarni; Sheetal Maulik
- Edited by: Paresh Manjrekar
- Music by: Abhijit Pohankar
- Release date: 2012
- Country: India
- Language: Marathi

Kuni Mulgi Deta Ka Mulgi (Marathi: कुणी मुलगी देता का मुलगी, is a Marathi comedy film produced by Maa Mahalaxmi Entertainment and directed by Ashok Karlekar, Starring Ashutosh Kulkarni, Sheetal Maulik, its music is by Abhijit Pohankar. The production marks the first time in the Marathi Film Industry that Rekha Bhardwaj sings a Marathi song. Songs are choreographed by award-winning choreographer Phulwa Khamkar, written by Da Sachin Sharma

== Cast ==
- Ashutosh Kulkarni as Madan
- Sheetal Maulik as Mohini
- Jaywant Patekar as Patil
- Megha Ghadge as Laavni Dancer

== Plot ==
The movie depicts a village called "Virpur", which has not seen even a single male getting married for the past 25 years. The males have got very eager for their marriage, as they had crossed the suitable age.

One fine day, Madan Mohan, son of the village head, returns from Mumbai after completing his education. Villagers seeks hopes in him as the person who could get married. The unmarried men of this village engages oneself to help in wedding preparation, with hopes that later they could even marry.

The story further describes about the strange villagers and their strange and weird thoughts of their ignorance and the resulting humorous situations, and of Madan’s true love.
