= Sadhi Mansa =

- Film poster
- Directed by: Bhalji Pendharkar
- Written by: Bhalji Pendharkar
- Produced by: Bhalji Pendharkar
- Starring: Jayshree Gadkar; Suryakant Mandhare
- Cinematography: Arvind Lad
- Edited by: Baburao Gokhale
- Music by: Anandghan
- Production company: Gayatri Chitra
- Release date: 15 December 1965
- Running time: 100 minutes
- Country: India
- Language: Marathi

Sadhi Mansa (transl. Common People) is a Marathi black-and-white film released on 15 December 1965. The film is written, directed and produced by Bhalji Pendharkar. The film has many popular songs sung by Lata Mangeshkar.

The film won the National Film Award for Best Feature Film in Marathi at the 13th National Film Awards ceremony held in 1966. The core plot of the movie went on to be used in the 1973 Kannada movie Doorada Betta.

== Plot ==
Shankar Lohar, a truck driver from Hanbarwadi, takes his truck, which had been damaged, to be repaired by Chakkadrao. Shankar helps repair the truck and then takes Chakkadrao, along with his wife Parvati, to Kolhapur. Impressed by Shankar's skills, Chakkadraao shows him a better job opportunity, but it turns out Chakkadrao has a shady background. Shankar gets involved in a legal case due to Chakkadrao's influence and receives a one-year sentence. Parvati stays loyal to Shankar but unfortunately gets into an accident caused by Chakkadrao. Shankar leaves in one direction while Parvati is taken to the hospital.

== Cast ==
- Jayshree Gadkar as Parvati Lohar
- Suryakant Mandhare as Shankar Lohar
- Rajshekhar as Chakkadrao
- Sulochana Latkar as Neighbour of Parvati
- Chandrakant Gokhale as Master
- Asha Patil as Child artist
- Master Vithal

== Soundtrack ==
Composed by Anandghan, the famous song "Airaneechya Deva Tula" was written by Jagdish Khebudkar and other songs are written by Yogesh and sung by Lata Mangeshkar, Usha Mangeshkar and Hridaynath Mangeshkar.

No.	Title	Lyrics	Singer(s)	Length
1.	"Airaneechya Deva Tula"	Jagdish Khebudkar	Lata Mangeshkar	3:34
2.	"Nako Devraya"	Traditional	Hridaynath Mangeshkar	3:09
3.	"Malachya Malyamandi"	Yogesh	Lata Mangeshkar	3:26
4.	"Vaat Pahuni Jeev Shinala"	Yogesh	Lata Mangeshkar	3:43
5.	"Rajachya Rang Mahalin"	Yogesh	Lata Mangeshkar, Usha Mangeshkar	3:07
Total length:				16:40

== Awards ==
13th National Film Awards

- National Film Award for Best Feature Film in Marathi

Maharashtra State Film Awards

- Maharashtra State Film Award for Best Film
- Maharashtra State Film Award for Best Actress for Jayshree Gadkar
- Maharashtra State Film Award for Best Director for Bhalji Pendharkar
- Maharashtra State Film Award for Best Female Playback Singer for Lata Mangeshkar
- Maharashtra State Film Award for Best Music Director for Anandghan
- Maharashtra State Film Award for Best Screenplay for Bhalji Pendharkar
- Maharashtra State Film Award for Best Dialogues for Bhalji Pendharkar
- Maharashtra State Film Award for Best Cinematography for Arvind Lad
- Maharashtra State Film Award for Best Art Direction for Sadashiv Gaikwad
