= Ajay Pohankar =

Indian singer

Pandit Ajay Pohankar
- Born: 24 February 1947 (age 79)
- Origin: Jabalpur, Madhya Pradesh, India
- Genres: Hindustani classical music, Kirana Gharana
- Occupation: Classical Vocalist
- Website: www.ajaypohankar.in

Ajay Pohankar (born 24 February 1947) is an Indian classical vocalist belonging to Kirana Gharana school of Hindustani classical music.

== Background and career ==
Ajay Pohankar (Marathi: अजय पोहणकर) was born in Jabalpur, Madhya Pradesh in a Deshastha Brahmin Marathi family, where his father was a lawyer. His first Guru was his mother Sushilabai Pohankar, a classical vocalist and a musicologist of Kirana gharana. At a young age of 11, Pohankar was invited to perform at the annual Sawai Gandharva Music Festival in Pune His sister, Swati Natekar, is also a singer based in London.

Ajay Pohankar is married to Anjali, a vocalist and musicologist who has also written a book on Thumri. They have a son, Abhijit Pohankar, a keyboard player of Indian classical music and a fusion music composer and producer.

== Awards and honours ==
- In 2009, Pohankar was awarded the Tansen Samman by the Government of Madhya Pradesh
- In 2012, he was awarded the Sangeet Natak Akademi Award, the highest award for performing artists, conferred by the Sangeet Natak Akademi, India's National Academy for Music, Dance and Drama.
- In 2026, Legend Award - Sur Jyotsna National Music Award was honored for outstanding contribution to Indian classical and Sufi music
