= Ugavali Shukrachi Chandani =

Marathi language song

Song by Arati Ankalikar Tikekar

from the album De Dhakka
- Language: Marathi
- Released: 2008
- Genre: Folk; lavani
- Length: 5:03
- Label: Zee Music Company
- Composer: Ajay-Atul-Sameer
- Lyricists: Shrirang Godbole; Abhijeet Deshpande

Music video
- Ugavali Shukrachi Chandani on YouTube

"Ugavali Shukrachi Chandani" is a 2008 Marathi song performed by Arati Ankalikar from the De Dhakka soundtrack. The composition is by the Ajay-Atul-Sameer, with lyrics penned by Shrirang Godbole and Abhijeet Deshpande. The song features Gauri Vaidya in its visuals. Arati Ankalikar won the Best Female Playback Singer award at the Maharashtra State Film Awards.

== Music video ==
The music video is a direct clip from the scene in De Dhakka. Sayali Jadhav, a talented dancer, is selected for the final round of a prestigious dance competition in Mumbai. Despite the family's dire economic situation and various personal crises, they make a grueling journey to the competition venue. Although faced with numerous setbacks, including a stolen rickshaw and ongoing family conflicts, Sayali's determination remains strong. With encouragement from a make-up artist, she participates in the competition and secures third place, bringing a sense of achievement and pride to her family amidst their struggles.

== Credits ==
- Arati Ankalikar – vocals
- Ajay-Atul-Sameer – composer
- Shrirang Godbole – lyricist
- Abhijeet Deshpande – lyricist

== Awards ==
| Year | Award | Category | Nominee | Result | Ref. |
|---|---|---|---|---|---|
| 2007 | Maharashtra State Film Award | Best Female Playback Singer | Arati Ankalikar | Won | |
| 2009 | Zee Chitra Gaurav Puraskar | Best Playback Singer – Female | Arati Ankalikar | Won | |
