= Airaneechya Deva Tula =

Song by Lata Mangeshkar

from the album Sadhi Mansa
- Language: Marathi
- Released: 1965
- Genre: Folk
- Length: 3:38
- Label: Saregama India Limited
- Composer: Anandghan
- Lyricist: Jagdish Khebudkar

Music video
- Airaneechya Deva Tula on YouTube

"Airaneechya Deva Tula" (Marathi: ऐरणीच्या देवा तुला) is a 1965 Indian Marathi-language song by Lata Mangeshkar for the soundtrack album of Sadhi Mansa. Lyrics was penned by Jagdish Khebudkar. It became an enduring classic among Marathi audiences and received numerous awards.

Mangeshkar was awarded by the Best Female Playback Singer by the Maharashtra State Government for the song.

== Development ==
Originally, the film's producer Bhalji Pendharkar had planned for Yogesh to write the lyrics for the song. However, Pendharkar decided to personally write the songs for the film instead. He approached Jagdish Khebudkar, providing detailed descriptions of the scene he envisioned. The song was meant to depict a hardworking blacksmith and his wife expressing gratitude to God. Initially titled "Airaneechya Deva Tula Aginphule Vahu De", the lyrics were changed during the recording session to "Airaneechya Deva Tula Thingi Thingi Vahu De". In Marathi, both 'Aginphule', and 'Thingi' symbolize 'spark'.

== Credits ==
- Anandghan – music composer
- Jagdish Khebudkar – lyricist
- Lata Mangeshkar – vocals
- Hariprasad Chaurasia – flute
- Saregama India Limited – label

== Awards ==
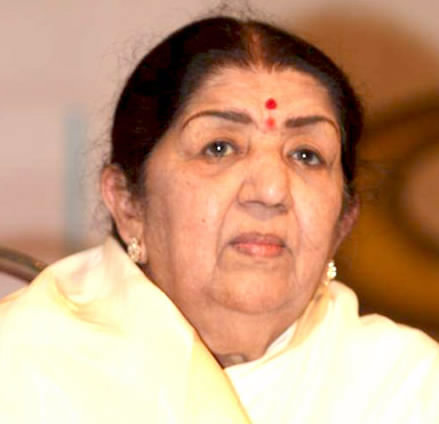
Lata Mangeshkar received the Best Music Director Award from the Maharashtra government for her work on the film.

Year	Award	Category	Nominee	Result	Ref.
1966	Maharashtra State Film Award	Best Female Playback Singer	Lata Mangeshkar	Won	
