= Madhura Datar =

Indian singer

Madhura
- Born: Pune, Maharashtra, India
- Occupation: Singer
- Years active: 2000–present

Madhura Datar is an Indian singer in Bollywood in the Marathi language. She is known for singing the songs of Asha Bhosle.

== Early life and education ==
Datar is from a musical family from the city of Pune in India. She attended Renuka Swaroop Memorial Girls High School there and Sir Parashurambhau College, affiliated to Pune University, from where she obtained a bachelor's degree. She was a student of Shaila Datar and Hridaynath Mangeshkar for her musical training. She has sung in many Marathi movies.

== Career ==
Datar has performed in TV programs like Saregama. She is also a part of the musical program by Hridaynath Mangeshkar named Bhavsargam. Her programs named Diwali Pahat are often performed don Diwali mornings.

She also has an independent program called Swarmadhura. She was appreciated by P L Deshpande for her singing.

== Discography ==
=== Films ===
Year	Film	Song	Composer	Co-artist
2008	Urus	"Lagnagharche Mandav"	Anand Modak	Kalyani Shelke
2011	Parambi	"Life Is Beautiful"	Ashok Patki	Swapnil Bandodkar, Avadhoot Gupte
2012	Baburao La Pakda	"Jamnar Nahi"	Durga Nataraj	Anand Shinde
2012	Golaberij	"Ithech Taka Tambu"	Purushottam Laxman Deshpande	Vasantrao Deshpande, Mithilesh Patankar
2014	Rama Madhav	"Swapnihi Navhate Disle"	Anand Modak	Hrishikesh Ranade
2014	Rama Madhav	"Loot Liyo"	Anand Modak	Solo
2016	Jalsa	"Paul Padla Chorich"	V. Sanap	Adarsh Shinde
2016	YZ	"Niramay"	Jasraj-Saurabh-Rishikesh	Solo
2017	Dhyanimani	"Ashi Kashi Vedi Maya"	Ajit Parab	Solo
2022	Sahela Re	"Sai Bai Ga"	Saleel Kulkarni	Aarya Ambekar
2022	Chandramukhi	"Sawaal Jawaab"	Ajay-Atul	Priyanka Barve, Vishwajeet Borvankar

=== Television ===
Year	Title	Composer	Notes
2016	Kahe Diya Pardes	Sameer Saptiskar	Debut
2019	Aggabai Sasubai	Ashok Patki	
2021	Majhi Tujhi Reshimgath	Rohit Nagbhide	

== Notable songs ==
- "Ashi Kashi Vedi Maya" - lyrics: Dhyanimani
- "Lut Liyo Mohe Sham Savre" - Rama Madhav

== Awards ==
- Nominated - Zee Chitra Gaurav Puraskar for Best Playback Singer – Female For Song Lut Liyo From the Movie Rama Madhav.
- Shahu Modak award for newcomer
- Ram Kadam smruti puraksar
- Zee awards
