= Amar Oak =

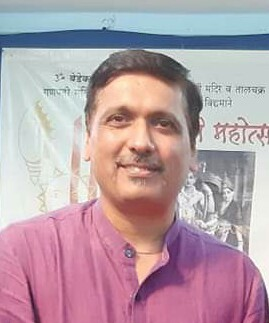

Background information
- Genres: Hindustani classical music
- Occupation: Flautist
- Instrument: Bansuri
- Website: http://www.amaroak.com

Amar Oak is an Indian classical and light music flautist.He appeared on the Marathi singing reality show Sa Re Ga Ma Pa. He also performs a commercial Show " Amar Bansi " which is based on his flute playing.

== Career ==
He has performed with artists such as Hridaynath Mangeshkar, Asha Bhosle, Hariharan, and Shankar Mahadevan.

Oak is also working with the youth icons like Avdhoot Gupte, Swapnil Bandodkar, Vaishali Samant, Ajay - Atul, Saleel Kulkarni and many more.

Oak has also performed with stalwarts like Tabla maestro Zakir Hussain, Suresh Wadkar and Ghazal maestro Ustd.Ghulam Ali (singer).

== Performances ==
1. Program "Swarali" by Shekhar Mahamuni
2. Accompanied in orchestra/groups like Awaaz ki Duniya, Gane Suhane, Azaadi Pachaas, Manik Moti, Marathi Bana and various other theme based shows.
3. Spell with his flute in Z Marathi 's "Sur Taal "
4. Performed in channel events such Nakshatranche Dene
5. Musical notes in J.P Wasvani's 'Religious Discourse' on Sony TV
6. Performed as indispensable artist by actively performing in Zee Marathi's "Sa Re Ga Ma Pa"
7. A musical album "Pyar Mohabbat" released by 'The Times Group'
8. Composed the music for a ballet, "Krishna Ranga."
9. Performs in unique concept based programs with stalwarts like Shounak Abhisheki (Swar Sangam) and Anand Bhate (Swar Bahar)
10. Kumar Gandharva Mahotsav, Chiplun
11. Chaturang Pratishthan, Mumbai

== Contribution in Music Albums ==
1. Sumiran – sung by Lata Mangeshkar, music directed by Pt. Hridaynath Mangeshkar
2. Mangal Murti Ganesh – sung by Asha Bhosale, music directed by Kedar Pandit
3. Surdas – Composed by composed & sung by renowned classical singer Mrs. Ashwini-Bhide Deshpande
4. Hridayatlya Gane – composed by Mr. Salil Kulkarni and sung by Ms. Bela Shende
5. Pancharatna – by Zee TV
6. Sparshaganda – by Kamlesh Bhadkamkar
7. Bhakticha Mala – sung by Yadneshwar Limbekar
8. Tuzya Vina - Composed By Prasad phatak and sung by Anweshaa
9. Sajan Ghar Aao re - Composed By Prasad phatak and sung by Anweshaa
10. Man He Vede ka Punha - Composed By Jeevan Marathe and sung by Anweshaa produced by Shrinivas G. Kulkarni

== Programs ==
1. Amar bansi
2. Golden Flute
3. Swar Bahar
4. Swar Sangam

== Awards ==
1. Recipient of the 'Sudhir Phadke Yuvonmesh Puraskar' awarded by 'Indradhanu, Thane' in 2007
2. 'Vocational Excellence Award 2009 - 2010 given by the Rotary Club of Nigdi, Pune
3. Swargia Ram Kadam Puraskar" in October 2010 from Hridaynath Mangeshkar
4. "The FIE Foundation" Award (National Award Category) of the year 2009–2010
5. Pannalal Ghosh Award
6. 'Maitra Yuva' Puraskar '
7. Vocational Excellence Award 2012 - 2013 given by Rotary Club of Thane Central
8. Vadan Gaurav Puraskar
