= Sarang Kulkarni =

Indian sarod player

- Origin: Pune, Maharashtra, India
- Genre: Hindustani classical music
- Occupations: Sarod player; composer
- Instrument: Sarod

Sarang Kulkarni is an Indian sarod player from Pune, Maharashtra. He received the Ustad Bismillah Khan Yuva Puraskar from the Sangeet Natak Akademi for 2023, in the classical instrumental music category, for his contribution to the sarod.

== Early life and training ==
Kulkarni comes from a family of musicians. His grandfather, Vinayakrao Kulkarni, and Vinayakrao's brother, Raghunathrao Kulkarni, were disciples of Vishnu Digambar Paluskar, the founder of the Gandharva Mahavidyalaya. His father, Rajan Kulkarni, is also a sarod player and became his guru.

Kulkarni first learned singing and studied tabla until the seventh standard. He took up the sarod after being drawn to the instrument on hearing his father perform, and trained under his father from then on.

== Career ==
In December 2017, Kulkarni made his debut at the Sawai Gandharva Bhimsen Mahotsav in Pune. He has composed music for the Marathi films Lathe Joshi, which won awards at several film festivals, and Udaharnarth Nemade, based on the writer Bhalchandra Nemade.

Kulkarni developed an electric variant of the sarod that combines elements of the sarod and the electric guitar. The percussionist Taufiq Qureshi named the instrument "Z'ROD" and used it in Soorya, a world-fusion band Qureshi formed.

== Awards and recognition ==
In February 2024, the Sangeet Natak Akademi announced that Kulkarni would receive the Ustad Bismillah Khan Yuva Puraskar for 2023.
