= Phulwa Khamkar =

Indian choreographer and dancer

- Born: 17 September 1974 (age 52); Mumbai, India
- Occupations: Choreographer, Dancer
- Spouse: Amar Khamkar
- Children: 1
- Parent(s): Anil Barve, Prerna Barve
- Website: Official website

Phulwa Khamkar, also spelt as Phulawa Khamkar (born 17 September 1974), is an Indian choreographer and dancer, who works in Bollywood and Marathi films. She is the winner of India's first dance reality show Boogie Woogie, Season 1 in 1997 and was among 5 finalist in Dance India Dance Super Moms in 2013. She has choreographed Hindi and Marathi films like, Happy New Year (2014), Julie 2 (2016), Natarang (2010), Kuni Mulgi Deta Ka Mulgi (2012), and Mitwaa (2015). She also won the Zee Marathi's dance reality show Eka Peksha Ek (season 1) and was a judge for second and third season of the same. She received Zee Gaurav Award 2010 for best choreography for song Apsara Aali from Natrang.

== Early life ==
She was named Phulwa by her father Anil Barve, who was a Marathi literature writer and named her Phulwa as it was the first magazine he wrote for. Khamkar went to Balmohan Vidyamandir in Dadar for her education. Later, she completed her graduation in commerce from Ramniranjan Anandilal Podar College of Commerce and Economics. She has been learned Gymnastics at Samarth Vyayam Mandir in Dadar. She is trained in Kathak and in contemporary dance.

== Career ==
Marathi movies like Natrang, Popat, Jhapatlela, Mitwaa, Aika Dajiba, Ideachi Kalpana, Sanngto Aika, Priyatama, Classmates had her as a dance choreographer. She trained Aishwarya Rai for the Bollywood film Taal. She assisted Farah Khan for song Manwa Laage of film Happy New Year. She also participated in Zee TV's reality show Dance India Dance Super Moms contest, where she was among 5 finalist. Phulwa was the winner of Sony TV's dance show Boogie Woogie, season 1. She guided Amruta Khanvilkar, Atul Kulkarni and Sonalee Kulkarni on perfecting their art. Apart from Bollywood and Marathi films, She has choreographed few South Indian films and Punjabi films. She is running her own dance school, called Phulwa's School of dance and Gymnastics in Mumbai.

== Filmography ==
- Dashami (2026)
- Photocopy (2016)
- Poshter Girl (2016)
- Happy New Year (2014)
- Classmates (2015)
- Sanngto Aika (2014)
- Priyatama (2014)
- Postcard (2014)
- Julie (2016)
- Kuni Mulgi Deta Ka Mulgi (2012)
- Mitwaa (2015)
- Popat (2013)
- Sa Sasucha (2010)
- Natarang (2010)
- Ideachi Kalpana (2010)
- Jhing Chik Jhing (2010)

== TV shows ==
| Year | Show | Network | Notes |
|---|---|---|---|
| 1997 | Boogie Woogie | Sony TV | Winner |
| 2009 | Eka Peksha Ek | Zee Marathi | Judge |
| 2013 | Dance India Dance Super Moms | Zee TV | 3rd runner up |
| 2013-2014 | Eka Peksha Ek | Zee Marathi | Judge |
| 2014 | Lux Jhakaas Heroine | 9X Jhakaas | Jury/Special panel |
| 2018 | Dance Maharashtra Dance | Zee Yuva | Judge |

== Awards ==
- Won Zee Gaurav Award 2010 for best choreography for Natrang.
- Won MAAI Award 2016 for film Mitwaa.
- Won Chhatrapati Puraskar for gymnastics by Government of Maharashtra.
- Best Choreographer Award for film Jhing Chik Jhing.
- Best choreographer award for film luckdown be positive at 59th Maharashtra state film awards.

== See also ==
- Indian women in dance
