= Abhijit Pohankar =

- Born: 29 June 1975
- Origin: Mumbai, India
- Genres: Indian classical/fusion/world music
- Occupation: Classical instrumentalist/music producer

Abhijit Pohankar (born 29 June 1975, in Mumbai) is an Indian classical instrumentalist. He plays classical music on the keyboard.

== Early life ==
Abhijit was born to Indian classical vocalist Ajay Pohankar. He is the grandson of Susheela Pohankar of the Kirana Gharana. He learned for some time with santoor player Shivkumar Sharma.

== Career ==
After playing classical music on a keyboard, he started venturing into world music and fusion music. His biggest album was Piya Bawari with his father Ajay Pohankar, and in that album he experimented with classical music fused with lounge music. His latest project/band is called Panch Tatva and also Urban Sufis where he experiments with Sufi Music and electronica.

He has done collaborative concerts with artists including Ajay Pohankar, Ghulam Ali (Pakistan), Hariharan, Rajan-Sajan Mishra, Anup Jalota, Pankaj Udhas, Vishwamohan Bhatt, and Sonal Mansingh. He has also composed the title track of the 2003 film Boom, by Kaizad Gusted and starring Amitabh Bachchan and Bo-Derek. His final tracks, Thumri Funk and Masters of Fusion: A Definitive Collection, were released with EMI in 2012.

== Discography ==
- Deeper Zone, Ninaad Music (1998)
- Syntileting Synthesizer, Neelam Audio (1999)
- Dharohar, Times Music (2000)
- Shanti, Times Music (2001)
- Tranquility, Sona Rupa (2000)
- Ekanth, Times Music (2001)
- Piya Bavari, Times Music (2002)
- Sajanwa, Music Today (2004)
- Kamasutra, Freespirit Eecords (2004)
- Koyaliya, Universal Music (2004)
- Piya Bavari Again, Times Music (2006)
- Urban Ragas, Saregama (2007)
- Navkaar Mantra, Saregama (2007)
- Thumri Funk, EMI (2012)
- Masters of Fusion: A definitive collection, EMI (2012)

== Awards ==
- The Youth Icon of Music Awards from Rotary Club.
- Della Technia Award for Excellence in Music.
- Tata AV Max Award for the Best Music Album, Piya Bawri in 2002.
