= Devaki Pandit =

Indian classical singer (born 1965)

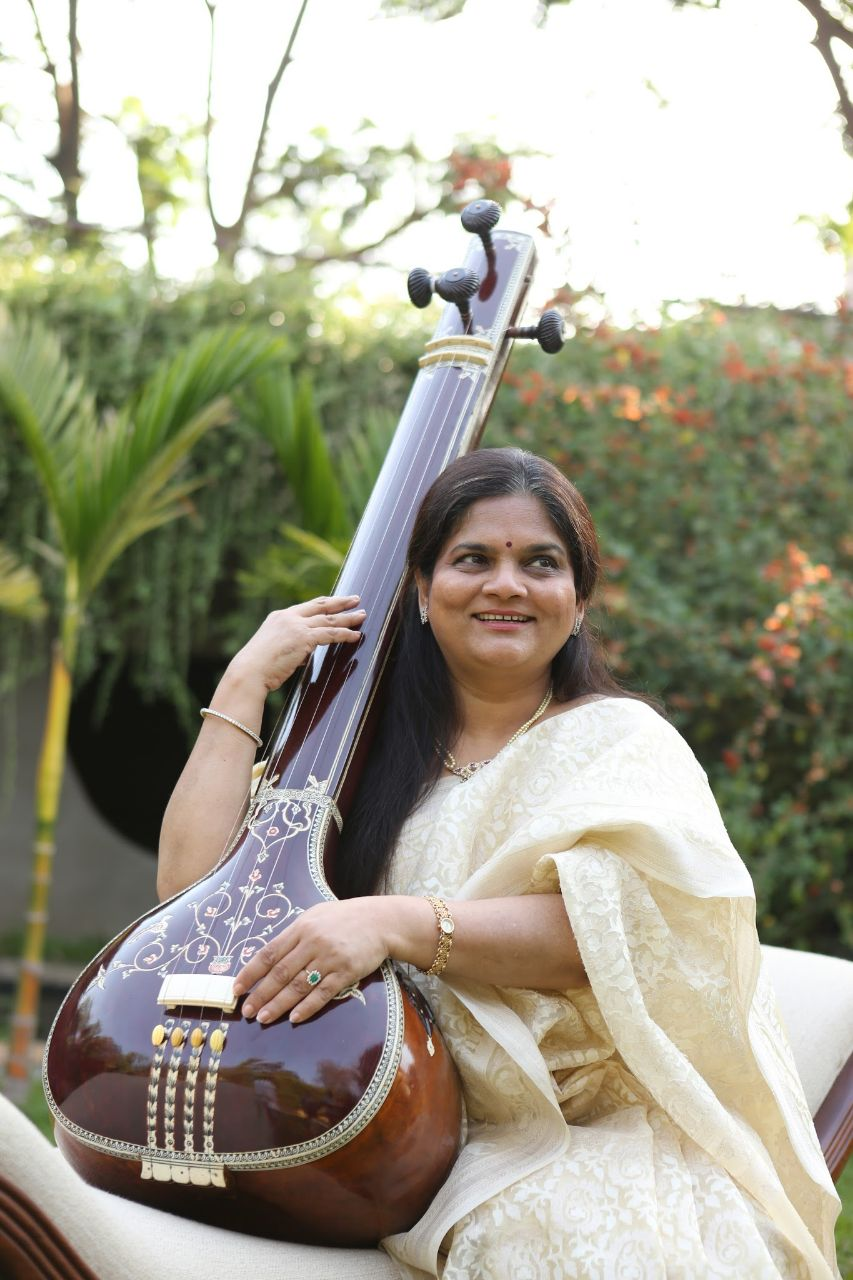
- Devaki Pandit in 2018

Background information
- Born: Devaki Pandit; 6 March 1965 (age 61)
- Origin: Maharashtra, India
- Genres: Indian Classical Singer, Playback Singing
- Occupation: Singer
- Years active: 1977–present
- Spouse: Sachin Nambiar
- Website: facebook.com/DevakiPanditOfficial

Devaki Pandit (Marathi: देवकी पंडित; born 6 March 1965) is an Indian classical singer of Hindustani classical music, Bhajan and Abhang, and a playback singer in Hindi and Marathi cinema. She is a disciple of Kishori Amonkar and Jitendra Abhisheki and belongs to the Jaipur-Atrauli gharana and Agra gharana. She worked with renowned artists like Hridaynath Mangeshkar, Ustad Raees Khan, Gulzar, Vishal Bhardwaj, Naushad, Jaydev, Jatin-Lalit, Ustad Zakir Hussain in the fields of film, television and live classical performances.

In 2022, she received the Sangeet Natak Akademi Award given by the Sangeet Natak Akademi, India's National Academy of Music, Dance & Drama. She has also won the Maharashtra State Film Award for Best Female Playback Singer four times in 1985, 2001, 2006 and 2011.

== Early life ==
Born in a household with performers in her family, Pandit received her initial training under her mother, Usha Pandit, and went on to train under Vasantrao Kulkarni, Kishori Amonkar, Jitendra Abhisheki and Babanrao Haldankar.

Of her beginnings she says, "Beauty in music emerges from the total, complete self-surrender to the Swar. My journey with music is to attain that Beauty through Sadhana, practice. I understood this co-relation at very early age as I was surrounded by artists, musicians, actors, and authors. My maternal grandmother Mangala Ranade, and her sisters hailed from Goa and were musicians and singers."

== Career ==
Her gayaki is thus influenced by her legendary gurus and their unique aesthetic approach to music. She was initiated into music by her mother, Usha Pandit. She received her formal training at the age of 9 from Vasantrao Kulkarni. Later, she also received guidance under Babanrao Haldankar of Agra gharana and Arun Dravid, who is also a disciple of Gaansaraswati Kishoritai Amonkar. She says, "My mother Usha Pandit, my first guru, also a disciple of Pt. Jitendra Abhisheki, taught me the basics of music but always tested me time and again; whether I had the perseverance to remain dedicated to an intense, lifelong commitment with Music. This vigilant and self-analytical approach helped me in my pursuit to acquire knowledge from great legendary gurus." With training from the Agra gharana, she started singing professionally by 12 years of age when she recorded for a children's album.

She went on to collaborate with renowned artists such as Hridaynath Mangeshkar, Ustad Rais Khan, Gulzar, Vishal Bhardwaj, Naushad, Jaidev, Jatin–Lalit, Ustad Zakir Hussain in the field of films, television and live classical performances.

== Musical journey ==
=== Hindustani classical ===
Tana Riri has been composed by Devaki Pandit

- Deepti (Legendary Legacy)
- Inner Soul (Ninaad)
- Sandesh (Ninaad)
- Raag- Lalit/ Anand Bhairav/ Pancham Hindol (Alurkar)
- Raag- Shree/ Kamod/ Bahar (Alurkar)
- Reverence (Times Music)
- Tana Riri (Times Music)

=== Devotional/spiritual ===
Pandit composed Shreeramraksha Stotram, Aradhana Mahakali and Ganaadheesh. She sang the Ram Raksha Stotra in 32 different Hindustani classical raagas.

- Krishna (NA Classical)
- Mohane Man Haryo (Nadarang Music)
- Shreeramraksha Stotram (NA Classical)
- Ganaadheesh (Times Music)
- Bhajanavali (Sa Re Ga Ma)
- Sharanagat (NA Classical)
- Sumiran (NA Classical)
- Sree Lalita Sahasranama (Times Music)
- Upanishad Amrut (Sony)
- Krishna Raas Geet (Times Music)
- Vrindavan (Times Music)
- Aradhana Mahakali (Music Today)
- Krishna Utsav (Sony)
- Sampoorna Shiv Aradhana (Times Music)
- Devi Aavahan (EMI)
- Santoshi Mata Vrat Katha (Vale Music)
- Mangla Prabhati (Vale Music)
- Shree Durga Stuti (Vale Music)
- Vande Prathamesha (Vale Music)
- Omkar Mantras (Vale Music)
- Morning Mantras (Vale Music)
- Himalayan Chants (Vale Music)
- Himalayan Chants 2 (Times Music)
- Ganapati Jagvandan (Times Music)
- Shree Shani Jagrata (Times Music)
- Sacred Mantras Of India (Times Music/Sona Rupa UK)
- Divine Chants of Gayatri (Sona Rupa UK)
- Chants Of India (Times Music)
- The Power Of Gayatri (Times Music/Sona Rupa UK)
- Jai Shree Hanuman (Sona Rupa UK)
- Ashta Prahar (Sona Rupa UK)
- Blessings For Parenthood (Times Music)
- Krishnavali: Divine Chants of Krishna (Times Music/Sona Rupa)
- Shri Krishna Hari (Times Music/Sona Rupa)
- Shiv (Sur Sagar)
- Mantras for Peace & Prosperity (Times Music)

=== Marathi ===
- Sadabahar Geete- Vol I & II (Fountain)
- Anmol Gaani (Sa Re Ga Ma)
- Gurukrupa
- Dayaghana Panduranga (Fountain)
- Saangu Kunaas Hee Preet (Fountain)
- Saajana (Fountain)
- Saare Tuzhyaat Aahe (Fountain)
- Gaanara Zaad (Fountain)
- Goad Tujhe Roop (Times Music)
- Shabda Swaranchy Chandnyat (Fountain)
- Man Muthitun Gharangalatana (RPG)

=== Hindi/Urdu ===
- Halka Nasha (with Hariharan) (Magnasound)
- Suno Zara (Times Music)
- "Phir bhor bhayee, jaga madhuban" from the film Saaz which was composed by the renowned tabla maestro Zakir Hussain.

== Awards and recognitions ==
- Kesarbai Kerkar Scholarship - the only person to receive it twice consecutively
- 1986 - Maharashtra State Award for "Best Female Playback Singer" (film : Ardhangi)
- 2001 and 2002 - Alpha Gaurav Puraskar
- 2002 - Maharashtra Government Award for "Best Female Playback Singer"
- 2002 - Mewati Gharana Award
- 2006 - Aditya Birla Kala Kiran Award
- Zee Chitra Gaurav Puraskar for Best Playback Singer – Female For Song Pahilya priticha Gandh (Arjun (2011 film))
