= Arati Ankalikar Tikekar =

Indian classical singer (born 1963)

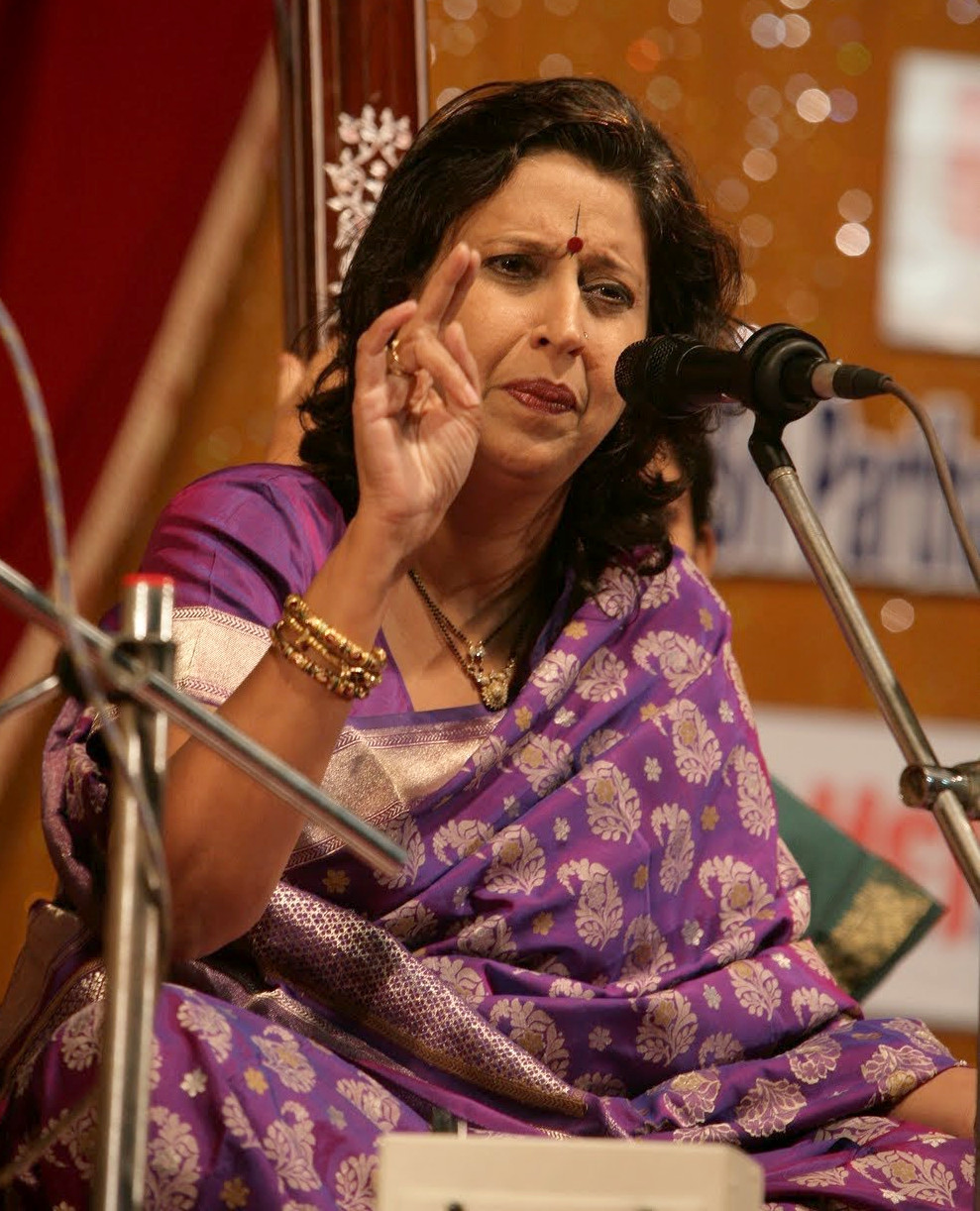
- Ankalikar Tikekar in 2011

Background information
- Born: Arati Ankalikar; 27 January 1963 (age 63); Bijapur, Karnataka, India
- Origin: Mumbai, Maharashtra, India
- Genre: Hindustani classical music
- Occupations: Classical vocalist; Playback singer
- Years active: 1975–present
- Website: AratiAnkalikar.com

Arati Ankalikar Tikekar (born 27 January 1963) is an Indian classical vocalist and playback singer, in Marathi, Konkani and Hindi film industry. She known for singing in Agra, Gwalior and Jaipur-Atrauli gharana style of Hindustani classical music. She has received National Film Awards twice for Best Female Playback Singer and has been awarded the Sangeet Natak Akademi Award in 2020.

She is known for her albums Tejomay Nadbrahm, Raag-Rang, and playback singing for the films like Antarnaad, De Dhakka, Savlee, Shyam Benegal's film, Sardari Begum (1996), Ek Hazarachi Note.

Her early musical education came from Vasantrao Kulkarni, of the Agra-Gwalior gharana. This was followed by training under noted vocalist, Kishori Amonkar of the Jaipur-Atrauli gharana. Thereafter that, she received further training from Pt. Dinkar Kaikini.

== Filmography ==
She has been the main playback singer for several Marathi, Konkani as well as Hindi films, namely:

- Sardari Begum, 1996
- Savlee
- De Dhakka, 2008
- Dil Dosti Etc
- Dhusar
- Samhitha, 2013.

== TV appearances ==
Ankalikar Tikekar has made appearances on television interviews, Reality Shows and as a guest judge on music shows. The following list consists few appearances on Marathi television networks.

Type of Show	Name	Role	Network Name
Interview	Ashi Manase Yeti	interviewee	Mi Marathi
Interview	Khupte Tithe Gupte	interviewee	Zee Marathi
Concert	Elgaar	Soloist	ETV Marathi
Concert	Rutu Hirawa	Soloist	Mi Marathi
Concert	Good Morning Maharashtra	Soloist	Zee Marathi
Music Competition	Idea SaReGaMaPa – Season 2	Guest Judge	Zee Marathi
Music Competition	Idea SaReGaMaPa – Season 2 Grand Finale	Special Appearance	Zee Marathi

== Performances ==
Ankalikar Tikekar has performed all over the world at prestigious venues, including the Aga Khan Museum in Toronto, Canada in 2019 for the Raag-Mala Music Society of Toronto.

== Accomplishments and awards ==
Ankalikar Tikekar received her first National Film Award for Best Female Playback Singer for the Konkani cinema, Anternaad, based on the life of a classical singer for the year 2006.

She received Maharashtra State Film Award, for the song "Ugavali Shukrachi Chandani" from the soundtrack of De Dhakka. Later, in 2013, she was awarded with National Film Award for Best Female Playback Singer for the second time in the Marathi movie, Samhita. In 2020, she was awarded the Sangeet Natak Akademi Award for Hindustani Music - Singing Category. The award is given by the Sangeet Natak Akademi - India's National Academy of Music, Dance & Drama, and is the highest Indian recognition given to people in the field of performing arts.

== Personal life ==
She is married to Indian film actor Uday Tikekar. Her daughter Swanandi Tikekar (born 1990) is a well-known Marathi television and theatre actress.
