= Bandishala =

- Bandishala poster
- Bandishala
- Directed by: Milind Lele
- Written by: Sanjay Patil
- Screenplay by: Sanjay Patil
- Story by: Sanjay Patil
- Produced by: Swati Patil
- Starring: Mukta Barve, Sharad Ponkshe
- Cinematography: Suresh Deshmane
- Edited by: Bhakti Mayalu
- Music by: Amitraj
- Production companies: Shantaai Motion Pictures, Shree Mauli Motion Pictures
- Distributed by: Rajat Enterprises
- Release date: 21 June 2019 (India)
- Running time: 140 minutes
- Country: India
- Language: Marathi

Bandishala is a 2019 Indian Marathi language film based on a real-life incident, written by Sanjay Patil and directed by Milind Lele. Produced by Swati Patil, the film stars Mukta Barve as Madhavi Sawant, a tough police officer who incurs the wrath of several powerful enemies who plan to get rid of her. The film has Sharad Ponkshe, Umesh Jagtap, Anand Alkunte, Ananda Karekar, Pankaj Chemburkar, Krutika Gaikwad and others in supporting roles. The film, produced by Shantaai Motion Pictures, Shree Mauli Motion Pictures, was distributed by Rajat Enterprises and released on 21 June 2019. The film score and soundtrack album are composed by Amitraj with lyrics by Sanjay Patil, cinematography by Suresh Deshmane, and editing by Bhakti Mayalu. The film received seven Maharashtra State Film Awards in different categories.

== Plot ==
The film opens with a riot among the inmates of the Satara Prison. A few inmates severely injure others. Senior Inspector Madhavi Sawant(Mukta Barve), the jailor, arrives in the nick of time and prevents other major casualties. Raghu Farakate(Umesh Jagtap), a hardened politically connected criminal with a track record of constantly escaping from the prison, highly detests Madhavi. Madhavi stays with her husband Shekhar (Vikram Gaikwad) and adopted daughter Shabana. Her close friend Rukhsana (Hemangi Kavi) often faces domestic abuse at the hands of her drunkard husband, which is known to Madhavi. To teach Raghu a lesson, Madhavi has him tonsured in front of all inmates. Two henchmen of Raghu in the prison, who try to rape an under trail prisoner, are brutally beaten by Madhavi. Dr. Salunkhe, a medical officer in charge of the Satara prison, is bribed by Raghu to prepare a false certificate to shift him and his gang to Atpadi. Bhagwantrao Gaikwad (Pravin Tarde) a contractor working under Minister Sapanrao, offers Madhavi a large sum of money as bribe to release Raghu and his gang for his own benefits. Raghu's lawyer requests Madhavi to send him to Atpadi. Madhavi, who is well aware of Raghu's corrupt track record, tears the notice to pieces. Raghu insults Madhavi by calling her an infertile whore. Angered, Madhavi beats up Raghu so brutally, that he is contracts paraplegia. DIG Sudamrao, who is directly connected with Minister Sapanrao, reprimands Madhavi for her acts and sets up a departmental enquiry against her. She blackmails him by showing him proofs of his illegal contracts and connections with politicians.

One night, while returning home from a wedding, Madhavi and her family are ambushed by a gang of thugs who kidnap Madhavi. Madhavi ends up getting severally raped and tortured by the goons, who throw her naked in the forest. An elderly couple rescue her and informs her family, who are shattered after hearing this. Madhavi is hospitalized and recovers soon. But the public start looking at her as a disgrace to the family. After a month of rehabilitation, Madhavi is restored on the position of the jailor, but constantly remains traumatized due to this incident. Subsequently, the police team led by Inspector Ramesh Nimbalkar, succeed in tracking down the rapists and arrest them. The trial begins with Advocate Raorane, an extremely high-profile lawyer, defending the culprits. Madhavi, in a bid to present a solid proof against Raghu Farakate in the court, tracks down a bar dancer who happens to be Bhagwantrao's mistress. Madhavi insists her to secretly record the meeting between Bhagwantrao, Sudamrao and Sapanrao. This clip proves the gang of rapists led by Dilip Javalikar guilty and exposes the nexus of Madhavi's seniors. Raorane attempts to defame Madhavi in the court by shamelessly mentioning her infertility and her violent nature as a reason for her false appeal. Madhavi, in her defence, says that she has already lost her respect. But if the gang is acquitted, they will surely attempt to rape another woman. She also exposes the 2 failed marriages of Raorane and the accusation of sexual assault he is facing from his 3rd wife. The court finally sentences the gang to life imprisonment and has DIG Sudamrao suspended. Bhagwantrao and Sapanrao are also charged with molestation and contract killing. Madhavi gets Rukhsana to kill Raghu Farakate in the hospital. Dilip while trying to escape from police gets severely beaten by Madhavi and the protesting women. Subsequently, he succumbs to his injuries. Finally Madhavi has the entire nexus of her superiors killed in a road accident.

== Cast ==
- Mukta Barve as Madhavi Sawant
- Sharad Ponkshe as Sudamrao Jadhav
- Pravin Tarde as Bhagwantrao Gaikwad
- Madhav Abhynkar as Spanrao
- Anand Alkunte as Dr.Salunke
- Vikram Gaikwad as Shekhar
- Varsha Ghatpande
- Ashwini Giri as Gunabai
- Umesh Jagtap as Raghu Farakate
- Ananda Karekar as Ramesh Parab
- Hemangi Kavi as Ruksana
- Ganesh Mahindrakar as Madhavi father
- Anil Nagarkar as Dilip Javalikar
- Ajay Purkar as Advocate Raorane
- Asha Shelar as Janabai

== Soundtrack ==
Bandishala

Soundtrack album by Amitraj
- Released: 12 June 2019
- Recorded: 2019
- Venue: India
- Studio: Shree Mauli Motion Pictures
- Genre: Feature film soundtrack
- Length: 14:27
- Label: Zee Music Company
- Producer: Swati Patil

The soundtrack and background score were composed by Amitraj, with lyrics penned by Sanjay Patil. The soundtrack has in total 4 songs released by Zee Music Company on 12 June 2019 and produced by Shree Mauli Motion Pictures. Rasika Ganoo, Aarti Kelkar, Mrunmayee Dadke, Amitraj, Vaishali Samant and Priyanka Barve have sung songs in the film.

Track listing
No.	Title	Singer(s)	Length
1.	"Diva Dharuniya Jasi Sasara"	Rasika Ganoo, Aarti Kelkar, Mrunmayee Dadke	3:04
2.	"Dayaghana Re Hi Yachana Re"	Amitraj	3:16
3.	"Petala Lal Diva"	Vaishali Samant	3:44
4.	"Kalokhachya Watevarati"	Priyanka Barve	4:23
Total length:			14:27

== Awards ==
Year	Award	Category	Nominee	Result
2019	Maharashtra State Film Awards	Best Actress	Mukta Barve	Won
2019	Maharashtra State Film Awards	Best Debut Production	Swati Patil	Won
2019	Maharashtra State Film Awards	Best Film	Sanjay Patil	Won
2019	Maharashtra State Film Awards	Best Lyrics	Sanjay Patil	Won
2019	Maharashtra State Film Awards	Best Art Director	Narendra Haldankar	Won
2019	Maharashtra State Film Awards	Best Singer Female	Priyanka Barve	Won
2019	Maharashtra State Film Awards	Best Background Music	Vijay Gavande	Won
