= Bela Shende =

Indian singer

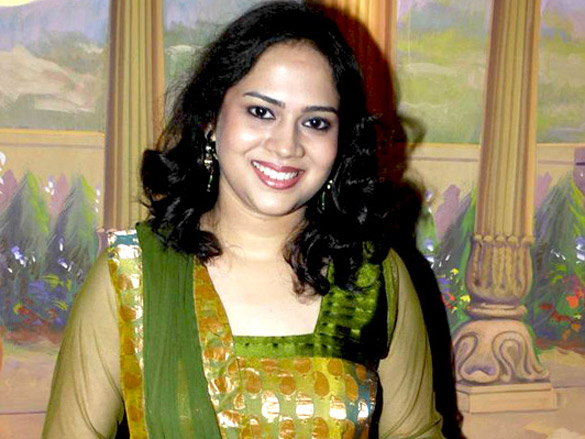
- Born: 4 January 1982 (age 44); Pune, Maharashtra, India
- Occupation: Playback singer
- Years active: 2001–present
- Website: www.belashende.com

Bela Shende is an Indian playback singer. She performed several songs in Bollywood and other film Indian industries. "Mann Mohana" from the film Jodhaa Akbar, "Su Che" from the film What's Your Raashee?, "Wajle Ki Baara" and "Apsara Aali" from Natarang are some of her famous songs. In 2014 she was awarded the National Film Award for Best Female Playback Singer for the song "Khurkhura" from the Marathi film Tuhya Dharma Koncha.

Shende started her career with the music album "Kaisa Yeh Jadoo" which was well received by the masses and was critically acclaimed. Her career in Bollywood started with the film Tera Mera Saath Rahen where she voiced for a brief part. She again got a big break in the 2005 submission for Academy Award, Paheli, where she voiced Rani Mukerji. In 2008 she crooned a bhajan in the Ashutosh Gowariker directorial Jodhaa Akbar for an A. R. Rahman composition and got an IIFA Award for Best Female Playback nomination for the song.

She then crooned hits in Marathi, her mother tongue, and received several awards and nominations for her excellence. Her renditions of lavnis "Apsara Aali" and "Vajle Ki Baara" from the Marathi film Natarang were well received. She became the sole voice of Kangana Ranaut in the 2013 musical Rajjo. Bela is credited as a talented vocalist and has established a career in the Marathi film industry. Besides Hindi, she has also sung in Marathi, Urdu, Tamil, Telugu, Kannada and Malayalam.Bela Shende sang this song "Mala jau dyana ghari aata wajle ki bara" at a time when this song became very famous and she received a lot of fame. Bela Shende has been working in the music industry since 2001 and has sung many songs till now.

== Early life and career ==
=== Early life ===
Bela Shende was born to Sanjeev Shende and Medha Shende. Her Grandmother, Kusum Shende, is a classical vocalist from the Kirana Gharana. Her sister Sawani Shende is also a classical vocalist. Bela is a graduate in commerce.

=== Career ===
Bela Shende won the Zee Sa Re Ga Ma reality TV singing contest at the age of 16.

Bela has lent her voice for various music directors most notably Ilayaraja, A. R. Rahman, Shankar–Ehsaan–Loy, Ajay–Atul, Yuvan Shankar Raja, Lalit Pandit, M. M. Keeravaani and Sohail Sen. She went on to receive the National Film Award for Best Female Playback Singer, for rendering the song "Khurkhura", in the year 2014 at the 61st National Film Awards.

Bela's rendition of lavnis in the film Natarang won her widespread critical acclaim. Her renditions of "Apsara Aali" and "Vajle ki Bara" became cult songs over time. Initially she lent her voice to Aishwarya Rai Bachchan in the epic historical drama Jodhaa Akbar, directed by Ashutosh Gowariker. She then went ahead to lend her voice for Priyanka Chopra in the film What's Your Rashee?, another Ashutosh Gowariker directorial.

In 2013 she became the sole voice of Kangana Ranaut in the musical drama Rajjo. The same year she sang Khurkhura for the film Tuhya Dharma Koncha which earned her National Award. Bela Shende next worked for A. R. Rahman in the Tamil film Kaaviya Thalaivan, its Malayalam version Pradhinayagan and Telugu Version Premaalayam for three versions of two different songs respectively.

In 2016, she recorded the title song for the film Mohenjo Daro along with Arijit Singh, A.R. Rahman and Sanah Moidutty. The song was composed by A.R. Rahman with lyrics penned by Javed Akhtar.

She sang the song "Marathi Breathless" from the album Kanherichi Phule which was composed and directed by Tejas Chavan. The album won the award for best music album at Chitra Padarpan Puraskar.

== Discography ==
=== Film songs ===
Year	Film	Song(s)	Music director(s)	Language	Co-singer(s)
2001	Tera Mera Saath Rahen	"Dum Dum Diga Diga"	Anand Raj Anand	Hindi	Atul Kale
2001	Ehsaas: The Feeling	"Tumse Milkar Hua Hai Ehsaas"	Anand Raj Anand	Hindi	KK
2005	Paheli	"Kangna Re"	M.M. Kreem	Hindi	Shreya Ghoshal, Madhushree, Kalapini Komakali, Sonu Nigam
2005	Paheli	"Khali Hai Tere Bina"	M.M. Kreem	Hindi	Hariharan
2005	Paheli	"Minnat Kare"	M.M. Kreem	Hindi	Shreya Ghosal, Madhushree
2008	Jodhaa Akbar	"Mann Mohana"	A. R. Rahman	Hindi	Solo
2008	Vaalmiki	"Kooda Varuviya"	Ilayaraja	Tamil	Solo
2008	Silambattam	"Machaan Machaan"	Yuvan Shankar Raja	Tamil	Ilayaraja
2008	Aegan	"Odum Varayil"	Yuvan Shankar Raja	Tamil	KK
2009	What's Your Raashee?	"Su Chhe"	Sohail Sen	Hindi	Rajab Ali Bharti
2009	What's Your Raashee?	"Koi Jaane Na"	Sohail Sen	Hindi	
2009	Kunguma Poovum Konjum Puravum	"Chinnan Sirusu"	Yuvan Shankar Raja	Tamil	Javed Ali
2009	Horn Ok Please	"Ayela Ayela"	Lalit Pandit	Hindi	Sudesh Bhosle, Nana Patekar
2010	Natarang	"Wajle Ki Bara"	Ajay–Atul	Marathi	Solo
2010	Natarang	"Kashi Mi Jau Mathurechya Bajari"	Ajay–Atul	Marathi	Ajay Gogavale
2010	Natarang	"Apsara Aali"	Ajay–Atul	Marathi	Ajay–Atul
2010	Mumbai-Pune-Mumbai	"Ka Kalena"	Avinash-Vishwajeet	Marathi	Solo
2010	We Are Family	"Sun Le Dua Yeh Aasmaan"	Shankar–Ehsaan–Loy	Hindi	Solo
2010	Mirch	"Mann Bhi Hai"	Monty Sharma	Hindi	Solo
2010	Kanimozhi	"Muzhumadhi"	Satish Chakravarthy	Tamil	Vijay Yesudas
2010	Kanimozhi	"Yaaro Ival Ival Yaaro"	Satish Chakravarthy	Tamil	Parthiv Gohil, Mukesh Mohamed
2010	Kacheri Arambam	"Azhagu Azhagu"	D. Imman	Tamil	Solo
2011	Balgandharva	"Aaj Mhare Ghar Pawana"	Kaushal Inamdar	Marathi	Solo
2011	Pathinaaru	"Adada En Meethu"	Yuvan Shankar Raja	Tamil	Hariharan
2011	Arjun	"He Shwas Tuze"	Lalit Sen	Marathi	Kunal Ganjawala
2012	Neethaane En Ponvasantham	"Vaanam Mella"	Ilaiyaraja	Tamil	Ilaiyaraaja
2012	Yeto Vellipoyindhi Manasu	"Laayi Laayi"	Ilaiyaraja	Telugu	Ilaiyaraaja
2012	Love Recipe	"Kare Kya Hum"	Sameer Phaterpekar	Hindi	Shaan
2012	Kamaal Dhamaal Malamaal	"Ishq Ki Dafli Baaje Re"	Sajid–Wajid	Hindi	Babul Supriyo, Sugandha Mishra
2012	Marathi Breathless - 9X Jhakaas	"Marathi Breathless"	Tejas Chavan	Marathi	Dr. Amol Kolhe
2013	Premachi Goshta	"Olya Sanjveli"	Avinash-Vishwajeet	Marathi	Swapnil Bandodkar
2013	Premachi Goshta	"Haravato Sukhacha"	Avinash-Vishwajeet	Marathi	Hrishikesh Ranade, Kailash Kher
2013	Udhayam NH4	"Maalai Pon Maalai"	G. V. Prakash Kumar	Tamil	S. P. Charan
2013	Besharam	"Tu Hai (Unplugged)"	Lalit Pandit	Hindi	Sonu Nigam
2013	Tuhya Dharma Koncha	"Khurkhura"	Dattaprasad Ranade	Marathi	Solo
2013	Rajjo	"Julmi Re Julmi"	Uttam Singh	Hindi	Solo
2013	Rajjo	'"Kaleja Hai Haazir"	Uttam Singh	Hindi	Solo
2013	Rajjo	"Kaise Milun Main Piya"	Uttam Singh	Hindi	Javed Ali
2013	Rajjo	"Mere Ghoongru"	Uttam Singh	Hindi	Javed Ali
2013	Lagna Pahave Karun	"Reshami Bandhane"	Ajay Naik	Marathi	Solo
2013	Lagna Pahave Karun	"Jaanta Ajaanta"	Ajay Naik	Marathi	Shaan
2013	Lagna Pahave Karun	"Tu Shwaas Sare"	Ajay Naik	Marathi	Kunal Ganjawala
2013	Mangalashtak Once More	"Sar Sukhachi Shravani"	Nilesh Moharir	Marathi	Abhijeet Sawant
2014	Kaaviya Thalaivan	"Alli Arjuna : Priya Sakhiye"	A. R. Rahman	Tamil	Haricharan
2014	Kaaviya Thalaivan	"Aarumilla"	A. R. Rahman	Malayalam (Dubbed version)	Srinivas
2014	Kaaviya Thalaivan	"Chalunaya"	A. R. Rahman	Telugu (Dubbed version)	Srinivas
2014	Ishq Wala Love	"Jeev Guntala"	Sagar-Madhur	Marathi	Swapnil Bandodkar
2014	I	"Tum Todo Na"	A. R. Rahman	Hindi (Dubbed version)	Ash King
2015	Baji	"Masoli"	Atif Afzal	Marathi	solo
2015	Mumbai-Pune-Mumbai 2	"Saath De Tu Mala"	Avinash-Vishwajeet	Marathi	Hrishikesh Ranade
2015	Mumbai-Pune-Mumbai 2	"Band Baja"	Avinash-Vishwajeet	Marathi	Hrishikesh Ranade, Suresh Wadkar, Anandi Joshi
2015	Mumbai-Pune-Mumbai 2	"Saad Hi Preetichi"	Avinash-Vishwajeet	Marathi	Swapnil Bandodkar
2015	Classmates	'Roj Mala Visrun Mi"	Amitraj	Marathi	Harshwardhan Wavare
2016	Mohenjo Daro	"Mohenjo Mohenjo"	A.R. Rahman	Hindi	Arijit Singh, A.R. Rahman, Sanah Moidutty
2016	Poshter Girl	"Kashala Lawtos"	Amitraj	Marathi	Solo
2019	Mogra Phulaalaa	"Maarva"	Rohit Shyam Raut	Marathi	Solo
2019	Triple Seat	"Roj Wate"	Avinash–Vishwajeet	Marathi	Solo
2021	99 Songs	"Sai Shirdi Sai"	A.R. Rahman	Hindi	Solo
2021	99 Songs	"O Mera Chand"	A.R. Rahman	Hindi	Solo
2021	99 Songs	"Sai Shirdi Sai"	A.R. Rahman	Telugu	Solo
2021	99 Songs	"Sai Shirdi Sai"	A.R. Rahman	Tamil	Solo
2022	Goshta Eka Paithanichi	"Paithani"	Manik-Ganesh	Marathi	Solo
2023	Circuitt	"Tujhawina"	Abhijit Kawthalekar	Marathi	Solo
2024	Hi Anokhi Gaath	"Mi Raan Bhar"	Hitesh Modak	Marathi	Hitesh Modak
2024	Rukhwat	"Rutu Premweda"	Gaurav Chati	Marathi	Sonu Nigam
2024	Dharmaveer 2	"Chal Karu Tayyari"	Avinash-Vishwajeet	Marathi	Vishal Dadlani
2024	Phullwanti	"Bho Shambhoo"	Avinash-Vishwajeet	Marathi	Rahul Deshpande
2024	Naad	"Sapan Watate Ga"	Pankaj Padghan	Marathi	Adarsh Shinde
2025	Nesippaya	"Nesippaya Nee Ennai"	Yuvan Shankar Raja	Tamil	Yuvan Shankar Raja, Javed Ali
2025	Sangeet Manapmaan	"Hrutu Vasant"	Shankar–Ehsaan–Loy	Marathi	Shankar Mahadevan
2025	Devmanus	"Aalech Mi"	Rohan-Rohan	Marathi	Rohan Pradhan
2025	Ashi Hi Jamva Jamvi	"Phulala Phul"	Amitraj	Marathi	Amitraj
2025	Sant Dnyaneshwaranchi Muktai	"Ghanu Vaaje"	Avadhoot Gandhi, Devdutta Manisha Baji	Marathi	Solo
2025	Sant Dnyaneshwaranchi Muktai	"Aadi Madhya Urdhwa"	Avadhoot Gandhi, Devdutta Manisha Baji	Marathi	Solo
2025	Sant Dnyaneshwaranchi Muktai	"Pasaydan"	Avadhoot Gandhi, Devdutta Manisha Baji	Marathi	Solo
2025	Sant Dnyaneshwaranchi Muktai	"Mungi Udali Aakashi"	Avadhoot Gandhi, Devdutta Manisha Baji	Marathi	Solo
2025	Ye Re Ye Re Paisa 3	"Aali Re Aali Gulabachi Kali"	Pankaj Padghan	Marathi	Solo
2025	Better Half Chi Love Story	"Na Kalale Kadhi Tula"	Sajan Patel, Ameya Nare	Marathi	Harshavardhan Wavare
2025	Vadapav	"Haravlya Vaata"	Kunal-Karan	Marathi	Solo
2025	Premachi Goshta 2	"Olya Sanjveli 2.0"	Avinash–Vishwajeet	Marathi	Kaavir
2025	Abhanga Tukaram	"Anandache Dohi"	Avadhoot Gandhi	Marathi	Solo
2026	Jabrat	"Padracha Gunha"	Jaibhim Shinde	Marathi	Solo
2026	Ranapati Shivray: Swari Agra	"Sukh Onjalit"	Avadhoot Gandhi	Marathi	Solo
2026	Cup Bashi	"Reshim Reshim"	Uttam Singh	Marathi	Shaan
2026	Ramayana: Part 1	"Mangala Sangama"	A. R. Rahman	Kannada	Armaan Malik

=== Non-Film songs ===
Year	Title	Composer	Language	Channel
2006	Sa Re Ga Ma Pa Marathi	Ajay-Atul	Marathi	Zee Marathi
2007	Daiva Janile Kuni	Ashok Patki	Marathi	Mi Marathi
2007	Ha Khel Savalyancha	Ashok Patki	Marathi	Mi Marathi
2007	Ek Zoka	Nilesh Moharir	Marathi	Mi Marathi
2007	Ayushyachya Valnavar	Nilesh Moharir	Marathi	Mi Marathi
2008	Jodi Jamli Re	Ashok Patki	Marathi	Star Pravah
2008	Antarpaat	Nilesh Moharir	Marathi	Star Pravah
2008	Anubandh	Swapnil Bandodkar	Marathi	Zee Marathi
2008	Chotti Bahu	Abhijeet Hegdepatil	Hindi	Zee TV
2010	Olakh	Ashok Patki	Marathi	Star Pravah
2010	Swapnanchya Palikadle	Ashok Patki	Marathi	Star Pravah
2010	Prajakta	Ashok Patki	Marathi	Mi Marathi
2010	Vrundavan	Nilesh Moharir	Marathi	Mi Marathi
2011	Parijaat	Nilesh Moharir	Marathi	Saam TV
2011	Apno Ke Liye Geeta Ka Dharmayudh	Dony Hazarika	Hindi	Zee TV
2011	Mrs. Kaushik Ki Paanch Bahuein	Dony Hazarika	Hindi	Zee TV
2011	Aabhas Ha	Milind Ingle	Marathi	Zee Marathi
2011	Pudhcha Paaul	Nilesh Moharir	Marathi	Star Pravah
2016	Nakushi - Tarihi Havihavishi	Mahesh Kale	Marathi	Star Pravah
2018	Sukhachya Sarini He Man Baware	Rohan-Rohan	Marathi	Colors Marathi
2018	Chhatriwali	Nilesh Moharir	Marathi	Star Pravah
2021	Dnyaneshwar Mauli	Devdatta Manisha Baji	Marathi	Sony Marathi
2021	Aai - Mayecha Kavach	Pankaj Padghan	Marathi	Sony Marathi
2021	Kyun Utthe Dil Chhod Aaye	Anand Shandilya and Surendra Singh	Hindi	Sony Entertainment Television

=== Albums ===
- Hridayamadhle Gaane – Marathi songs album released by Fountain music
- Sang in Shri Taufiq Quereshi's fusion album named 'Taa Dhaa'
- Sapney – Hindi songs album released by Zee Music Company
- Kaisa Yeh Jadoo – Hindi songs album released by Magnasound (Audio & video)
- Mazya Manaa – Marathi songs album released by Fountain Music
- Doorchya Raanat– Marathi songs album on the songs written by N. D. Mahanor, released by Sony Music
- Pandharicha Swami – Marathi Abhang album released by Fountain music
- Motiyancha chur – Marathi songs album released by Times Music
- Sahaj Tuzi Gaath Pade – Marathi album which includes 8 songs written by the greatest Marathi poet G. D. Madgulkar released by Uttam Pushpa
- Son Chapha – Marathi songs album released by Fountain music
- Man Mor – Marathi songs album released by Fountain Music
- Pahila Vahila Prem – Marathi album released by Fountain music
- Gandha Halke Halke – Marathi songs album released by Fountain music
- Arpan – Marathi songs album comprising eight songs which she composed and one written by her Father and Guru Dr. Sanjeev Shende
- Has sung for many commercial jingles and devotional albums like Gayatri Mantra, He Ram, etc.

== Awards and nominations ==
Year	Award	Category	Film	Song	Result
2000	IMI Zee Sangeet Awards	Debut Singer of the Year	Kaisa Yeh Jadoo	"Kaisa Yeh Jadoo"	Won
2009	Mirchi Music Awards	Female Vocalist of the Year	Jodhaa Akbar	"Man Mohana"	Won
2009	International Indian Film Academy Awards	Best Female Playback Singer	Jodhaa Akbar	"Man Mohana"	Nominated
2009	Stardust Awards	Best Playback Singer – Female	Jodhaa Akbar	"Man Mohana"	Nominated
2010	Zee Chitra Gaurav Puraskar	Best Playback Singer – Female	Natarang	"Wajle Ki Bara"	Won
2010	Big FM Entertainment Awards	Best Playback Singer – Female	Natarang	"Apsara Aali"	Won
2010	Maharashtra State Film Awards	Best Female Playback Singer	Natarang	"Apsara Aali"	Won
2010	V. Shantaram Awards	Best Playback Singer – Female	Natarang	"Kashi Me Jau Mathurechya Bajari"	Won
2010	Marathi International Film and Theatre Awards	Best Playback Singer - Female	Natarang	"Wajle Ki Bara"	Won
2010	Maharashtra Times Sanman	Best Playback Singer – Female	Natarang	"Wajle Ki Bara"	Won
2010	RAPA National Awards	Best Playback Singer – Female	Zhale Mokale Aakash	"Zhale Mokale Aakash"	Won
2010	Maharashtracha Favourite Kon?	Favourite Female Playback Singer	Natarang	"Wajle Ki Bara"	Won
2011	Maharashtracha Favourite Kon?	Favourite Female Playback Singer	Balgandharva	"Aaj Mhare Ghar"	Won
2011	Marathi International Film and Theatre Awards	Best Playback Singer – Female	Balgandharva	"Aaj Mhare Ghar"	Won
2011	Maharashtra State Film Awards	Best Female Playback Singer	Dhusar	"Daatlele Dhuke"	Nominated
2011	Sanskruti Kaladarpan Puraskar	Best Singer – Female	Debu	"Debu"	Won
2014	Zee Chitra Gaurav Puraskar	Best Playback Singer – Female	Lagna Pahave Karun	"Reshami Bandhane"	Nominated
2014	Maharashtra Times Sanman	Best Playback Singer – Female	Premachi Goshta	"Olya Sanjveli"	Nominated
2014	Mirchi Music Awards Marathi	Female Vocalist of the Year	Premachi Goshta	"Olya Sanjveli"	Won
2014	Mirchi Music Awards Marathi	Song of the Year	Premachi Goshta	"Olya Sanjveli"	Won
2014	61st National Film Awards	Best Female Playback Singer	Tuhya Dharma Koncha	"Khurkhura"	Won
2015	Mirchi Music Awards Marathi	Female Vocalist of the Year	Baavare Prem He	"Baavare Prem He"	Won
2015	Mirchi Music Awards Marathi	Album of the Year	Mangalashtak Once More	"Sar Sukhachi"	Won
2015	Chitradrushti Awards	Best Female Playback Singer	7 Roshan Villa	"Ratra Kali"	Won
2010	Maharashtracha Favourite Kon?	MFK Award for Favourite Female Playback Singer	Natarang	Apsara Aali	Nominated

=== Honorary awards ===
- Winner of the TVS Sa Re Ga Ma Pa Mega Final – 1998
- Raja Mantri Smruti Puraskar at the hands of Vijay Tendulkar
- Nargis Dutt Award
- Pune Ki Asha award
- Suheel Sneha Award at the hands of the then Chief Minister of Maharashtra Sushilkumar Shinde
- "Ga Di Ma Award" by Ga Di Ma Pratishthan
- "Vidya Pradnya Puraskar"
- IMA (Indian Music Academy) Award for outstanding contribution in playback singing for consecutive 5 years.
- Pu.La Tarunaai Puraskar (in the name of late Shri Pu.La Deshpande) for outstanding contribution in music.
- Kala Gaurav Puraskar
- Sahyadri Cine Award
- Zee Gaurav Puraskar for her Marathi album Pandharicha Swami
- Stardust Award for New Musical Sensation – Female for the song "su chhe" from the film What's Your Rashee?.

== See also ==
- List of Indian playback singers
