= Savani Ravindra =

Indian Musical artist (born 1989)

Savaniee Ravindrra
- Born: Savani Ravindra Ghangurde Dhande; 22 July 1989 (age 36)
- Origin: Ratnagiri, Maharashtra, India
- Genres: Ghazal, Filmi, Hindustani classical music
- Occupation: Singer
- Instrument: Vocals
- Website: www.savaniravindra.com

Savani Ravindra, also known as Savaniee Ravindrra or Savani Ravindra Ghangurde Dhande (Marathi: सावनी रविंद्र; born 22 July 1989), is a singer in the Marathi music industry. She received the award for Best Female Playback Singer at the 67th National Film Awards in 2021.

== Early life and education ==
She is the daughter of Dr. Ravindra Ghangurde and Dr. Vandana Ghangurde who are both singers. She did her schooling at Fergusson College, Pune, and she studied Hindustani classical music with Pandit Pandharinath Kolhapure, and ghazal with Ravi Date.

== Career ==
Savani Ravindra was among the five finalists of the 2011 IDEA Saregma singers.

She sung on albums such as "Aashaye", "Canvas" and "Ajunahi" She has performed on the shows Black & White, Ghazal ka safar and gulzar baat pashmine ki. She has sung in films such as Ajab Lagnachi Gajab Gosht and Kuni Ghar Deta Ka Ghar. One of her Marathi songs, "Tu Mala Mi Tula Gungunu Laglo- Honar Sun Mi Hya Gharchi -Zee Marathi", is a duet with singer "Mangesh Borgaonkar". She also sung the title song of popular television serial 'Kamala' aired on E-tv Marathi along with Shrirang Bhave, and was a backing vocalist for the songs sung in the Marathi movie Sairat.

== Awards ==
- National Film Award for Best Female Playback Singer, the 67th National Film Awards of India.
- Nominated - Zee Chitra Gaurav Puraskar for Best Playback Singer – Female For Song Magan masta From the Movie One Way Ticket.
- Nominated - Zee Chitra Gaurav Puraskar for Best Playback Singer – Female for song Mangalagaur from film Baipan Bhaari Deva
- Nomination - Maharashtra State Film Award for Best Female Playback Singer Raan Petala from Movie Bardo
