= Kasta sari =

Style of sari draping

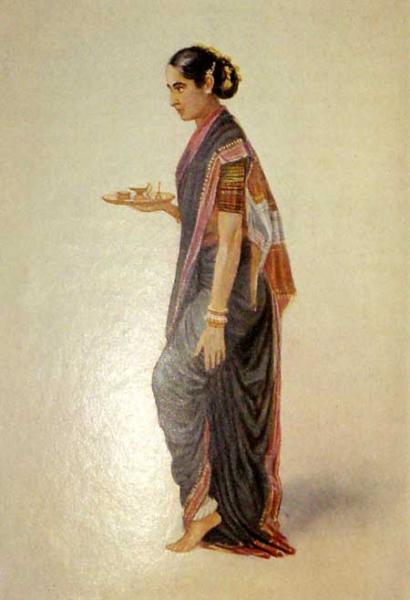
Illustration of woman dressed in kaashta nauvari sari, 1928.

The Kaashtha sari (Marathi: नऊवारी साड़ी) is a Koli style of sari, draping in a similar way to the Maharashtrian dhoti. The word Kaashtha refers to the sari being tucked at the back. Since this sari is usually worn using a single nine yard cloth, it is also referred to as Nauvari, which means Nine Yards. Sakachcha sari is another term commonly used to refer to this style of sari. It is described as Akanda Vastra, which means it doesn't need any other attire to support it. In fact, this attire holds great significance as women across different walks of life have worn it. It is not just worn at religious and cultural events, but women have fought wars in the past and still work in farmlands wearing this.

== Types of draping ==
=== Traditional drape ===
It is the traditional Marathi style of sari which is worn without a petticoat. This style of sari draping is common among all the castes but the way of draping differs according to the region and topography as well. For example, Brahmin women wear it in a particular way (called brahmni on the other side), while Aagri people from the Raigad district wear it in a knee-length fashion called 'adwa patal', whereas with a small variation the kunbi or the farmer women of the Raigad district and some parts of Ratnagiri as well wear nineyard ( called "uprati") .The name uprati means upside down, which is because of some folds draping the sari are upside down. One of the special features of adwa patal and uprati arethat is that these saris are draped without tying knots, though the sari is still very tightly draped.

On the contrary, women from rural Puñe and Satara Ahmed Nagar or Kolhapur wear it to the ankle length which is very popular. Also, Brahmins wear it in a particular way where the border of the sari is displayed on the front side as well, similar to the kashta on the back side. Some details are given below as well. This sari is draped so that its center is neatly placed at the back of the waist and the ends are tied securely in the front, and then the two ends are wrapped around the legs. The decorative ends are then draped over the shoulder and the upper body or torso. Sayali Badade, an HR executive said, "A woman who wore a Nauvari was always looked upon with respect. The reason was that both shoulders of women were covered, and it made for a completely traditional wear. The style was originally started and popularised during the Peshwai reign."

=== Koli-style drape ===
Women of the Koli tribe also wear this style of sari but cut into two pieces. One piece is worn around the waist while the other piece is used to cover the upper part of the body. It is taken on the head over the left shoulder in the Maratha fashion. The Koli women are decorative with both dress and ornament and this sari of nine yards of cotton fabric is draped adeptly over the hips so that the figure is graceful in movement.

== Usage ==
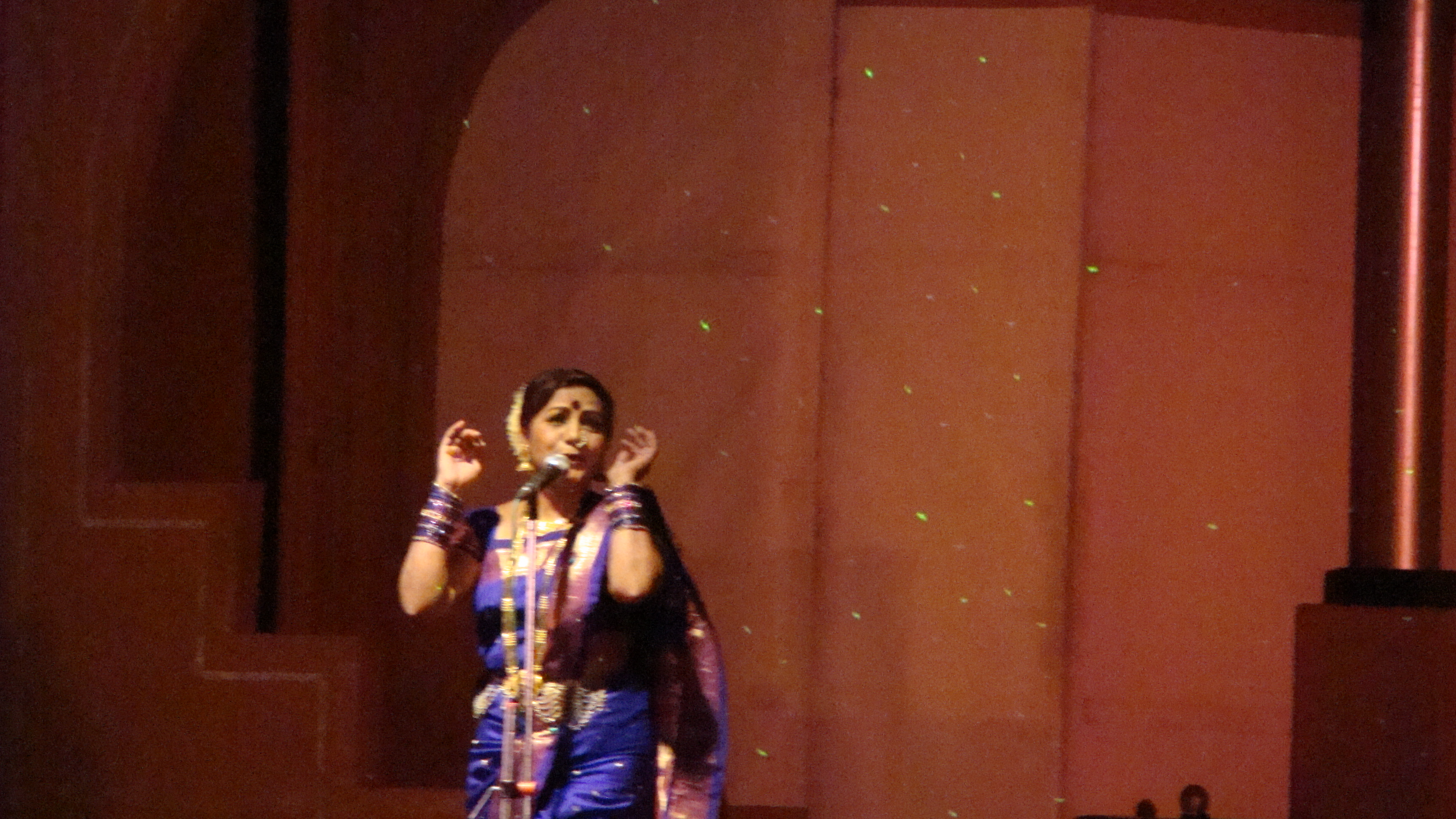
Lavani performance by Surekha Punekar in a nine-yard kasta sari.

=== Traditional usage ===
The traditional 'nauvari' , aso known as 'Lugada', this sari is worn mostly by elderly Maharashtrian women. However, in contemporary fashion, the trend of wearing nine-yard Kasta sari is increasing by those who want to keep the Marathi tradition alive. It requires technique and practice to wear a nine-yard sari. Mostly worn in dance competitions ("lavani") and Maharashtrian folk dance, the Kasta sari has made a resurgence in the fashion industry. Prashant Shalgar, a nine-yard Kasta sari seller, said, "It has always been in demand. Though earlier only elder generation women would pick them up, now many young girls choose them for their elegant looks." Prashant Kolhe, a management executive, said, "My grandmother used to wear a nine-yard sari. It would look great on her. She used to carry it very well. I guess Indian saris are the best fashion wear available on the globe. You cannot look graceful, trendy and comfortable in any other dress." Women dabbawalas in Mumbai are dressed in nauvari saris.

=== Modern usage ===
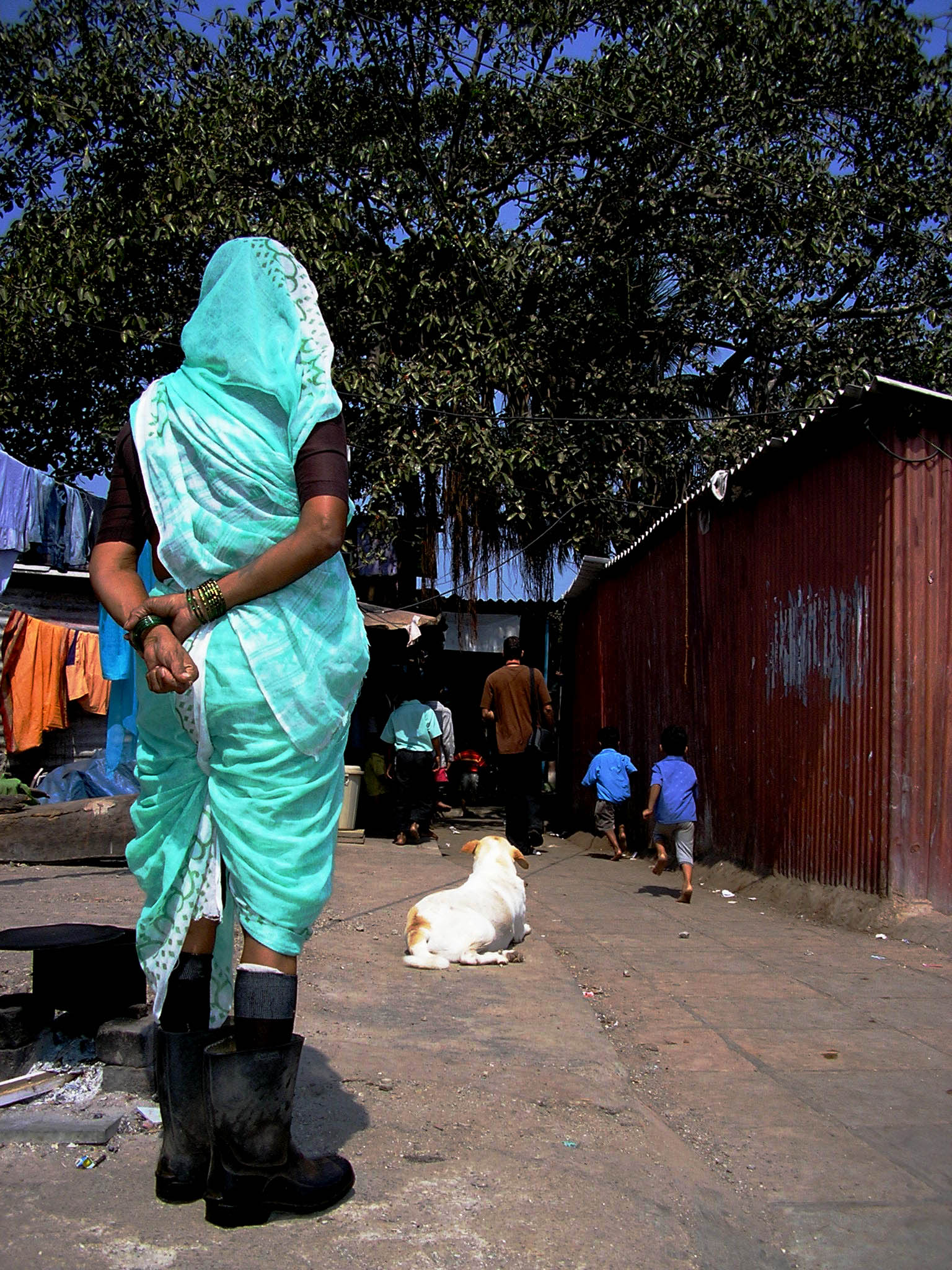
Maharasthran fisherwoman in a kasta sari.

To make the wearing more easy and comfortable, the market is all set to sell stitched Kasta sari for those who love drape it. Sandhya Kenjale, another Kasta sari seller, says, "I started stitching nineyard saris because I could never drape it properly. For draping a nineyard sari, you should have some guidance for it is a technique to wear it. There are many occasions when women choose to wear nine-yard saris but the drawback is they do not know the technique. Ready-to-wear nine-yard sari is the perfect solution for such problems. Just wear it like a salwar, put the pallu over the shoulder, and you are dressed in few minutes. Also, teen-aged girls are seen wearing it in their school or college gatherings. Many brides are now taking help of such ready-to-wear nine-yard saris. With a wide range of them available in the market, buyers have a lot of choice. Available in Bangalore silk, Belgaum silk, pure silk, Orissa silk, nine-yard saris are priced reasonably. "Prashant Shalgar added, "Marathi movies are responsible for keeping the traditional wear alive. To make it easy, these saris are now stitched and sold in the market." Stylist Pradnya Bhalekar stated, "You can wear a stitched Nauvari like a salwar. It is as simple as wearing your favourite pair of denims. Besides, you don't have to worry that the drape might come off." Shobhaa De told in her blog that she suggested to Mukesh Ambani that the cheerleaders of Mumbai Indians wear the traditional nine yard kasta sari and perform dance routines for the local lavani.

=== Reduction in usage ===
On the contrary, some consider the Kasta sari has fallen out of favour currently. It is considered far too revealing. It is rarely seen in the cities. This type of sari is regularly made fun of in films, portrayed as some sort of "sexy" garment, meant to titillate. In reality, the Kasta sari embodies freedom for women. In a way it is similar to the dhoti as it allows leg movement and the ankles are left free. But today the Kasta sari will only be considered decent if distorted to hide every inch of a woman's body.

== Bollywood ==
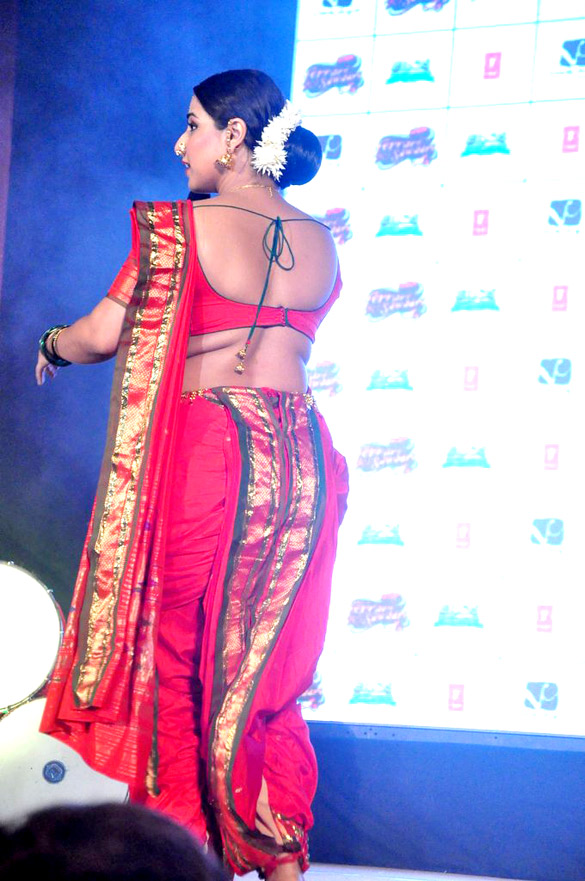
Vidya Balan performs Lavani in a kasta sari to promote Ferrari Ki Sawaari

Women adorning kasta saris are seen in some Bollywood films, although they are mostly worn in song sequences. Generally, in modern Bollywood fashion, the pallu is fully wrapped around the waist rather than on the shoulder and to cover the blouse or choli folded chunri of contrast color is pinned up. Also, the hairstyle on is step-cut up to shoulder length with smart nose ring or Nath and Chandrakor Bindi.

The most famous example of Kasta sari in Bollywood is the song sequence of "Humko Aaj Kal Hai Intezaar" in the film Sailaab (1990) featuring Madhuri Dixit in a yellow and green Kasta sari. Another recent example is of Kim Sharma in the film Tom, Dick, and Harry (2006). She played the role of Bijlee, a fisherwoman, for which she appeared in Kasta saris of different color throughout the entire film.

The first look and promos of Agneepath, the 2012 remake of the 1990 Hindi film of the same name was released which featured actress Katrina Kaif dancing for an item song "Chikni Chameli" in a yellow kasta sari. Actress Vidya Balan dressed in a red kasta sari along with lavani dancers performed live on stage her latest item number "Mala Jau De" for the audience, from Vidhu Vinod Chopra's upcoming film Ferrari Ki Sawaari. She told she was inspired from Madhuri Dixit's performance from Sailaab. In 2015, actresses Deepika Padukone and Priyanka Chopra featured in nauvari saris for a dance sequence in the film Bajirao Mastani. Anju Modi, the costume designer for the film stated, "I do hope that after this movie, the nauvari sari makes a comeback."
