= Mi Marathi =

- Country: India
- Network: (SAB)
- Headquarters: Mumbai, Maharashtra, India

Programming
- Language: Marathi
- Picture format: 576i (4:3) (SDTV)

Ownership
- Owner: Sri Adhikari Brothers Television (SAB)

History
- Launched: 3 May 2007

Links
- Website: Official website

Mi Marathi was established as a small family owned business in 1985, the Gautam Adhikari & Makrand Adhikari led the company for a ten-year span. In 1985 the company was listed on the BSE and NSE, making SAB the first ever Television Company to be publicly list. Mi Marathi programming primarily consists of family dramas, cooking shows, news and movies. Currently 26 serials of Mi Marathi channel are being rebroadcast on Fakt Marathi channel.

== Programming ==
=== Fiction ===
==== Monday to Saturday ====
Start time	End time	Name in Latin Script	Name in Devanagari Script	Days
7:00 PM	7:30 PM	Kanyadaan	कन्यादान	Mon-Sat
7:30 pm	8:00 pm	Phiruni Navi Janmen Mi	फिरुनी नवी जन्मेन मी	Mon-Sat
8:00 pm	8:30 pm	Anolkhi	अनोळखी	Mon-Sat

==== 8:30 pm – 9:00 pm ====
Name in Latin Script	Name in tanuja Script	Days
Bramahandnayak-Gan Gan Ganat Bote	ब्रह्मांडनायक-गण गण गणांत बोते	Mon-Wed
Krupasindhu-Bhiu Nakos Mi Tujhya Pathishi Aahe	कृपासिंधू भिऊ नकोस मी तुझ्या पाठीशी आहे	Thu-Sat

==== 9:00 pm – 10:00 pm ====
Name in Latin Script	Name in Devanagari Script	Days
1 Taas Bhutacha	१ तास भुताचा	Fri-Sat

==== 10:00 pm ====
Name in Latin Script	Name in Devanagari Script	Days
Nana O Nana	नाना ओ नाना	Mon-Tue
Maddam Sasu Dhaddam Sun	मड्डम सासू ढड्डम सून	Wed-Thu
Shrimant Gangadhar Pant	श्रीमंत गंगाधर पंत	Fri-Sat

=== Non-Fiction ===
Name in Latin Script	Name in Devanagari Script	Days	Time	Genre
Mogra Phulala	मोगरा फुलला	Daily	7:30 am	Variety
Lazzatdar	लज्जतदार	Mon-Fri	2:30 pm	Food
It's Show Time	इट्स शो टाइम	Sat-Sun	5:30 pm	Entertainment
Bhavishyavar Bolu Kahi	भविष्यावर बोलू काही	Mon-Sat	6:30 pm	Astrology
Awaaz Maharashtratcha	आवाज महाराष्ट्राचा	Mon-Tue	9:00 pm	Reality Musical
Bole To Malamaal	बोले तो मालामाल	Wed-Thu	9:00 pm	Variety

== List of Rebroadcast Serials on Fakt Marathi Channel ==
Name of Rebroadcast Serials in Latin Script	Name of Rebroadcast Serials in Devanagari Script	Year the Serial was Rebroadcast
Check Mate ... Khel Sampala	चेक मेट ... खेळ संपला	2018
Adishakti	आदिशक्ती	2018
Krupasindhu	कृपासिंधू	2018
Bramhandnayak	ब्रह्मांडनायक	2018
Nana O Nana	नाना ओ नाना	2018
Shrimant Gangadhar Pant	श्रीमंत गंगाधर पंत	2018
Kanyadaan	कन्यादान	2019
Vrundavan	वृंदावन	2019
Mangalsutra	मंगळसूत्र	2019
Mrutyunjay ... Karnachi Amargatha	मृत्युंजय ... करणाची अमरगाथा	2019
Ek Jhoka ... Niyaticha	एक झोका ... नियतीचा	2019
Aamdar Saubhagyavati	आमदार सौभाग्यवती	2019
Maddam Sasu Dhaddam Sun	मड्डम सासू ढड्डम सून	2019
Anolkhi	अनोळखी	2019
Ha Khel Savlyancha	हा खेळ सावल्यांचा	2020
Ek Taas Bhutacha	एक तास भुताचा	2020
He Daiv Janile Kuni	हे दैव जाणिले कुणी	2020
Dharla Tar Chavtay Sodla Tar Paltay	धरलं तर चावतंय सोडलं तर पळतंय	2020
Khel Mandala	खेळ मांडला	2021
One Day Ka Funday	वन डे का फंडे	2021
Bhandarbhul	भंडारभुल	2021
Changbhala	चांगभलं	2021
Aayushachya Valnavar	आयुष्याच्या वळणावर	2021
Phiruni Navi Janmen Mi	पिरुनी नवी जन्मेन मी	2021
One Two Ka Four	वन टू का फोर	2021
Anupama	अनुपमा	2021
Prajakta	प्राजक्ता	2021
Baba Ek Atut Nata	बाबा एक अतूट नातं	2021
Saptapadi ... Ek Atut Bandhan	सप्तपदी ... एक अतूट बंधन	2021
Lajjatdar	लज्जतदार	2021
Varcha Class	वरचा क्लास	2022
Saheb	साहेब	2022
Antarnaad	अंतरनाद	2022
Mi Marathi Cha	मी मराठीचा	2022
Swarasha	स्वरआशा	2022
