= Guru Thakur =

Indian Marathi poet

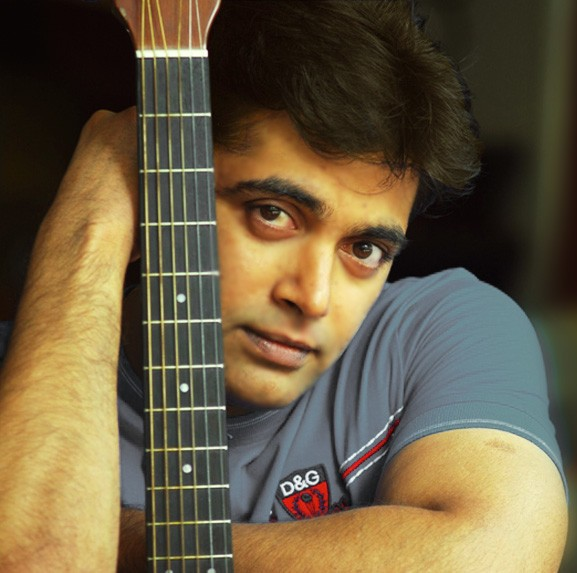
- Born: 18 July; Mumbai, Maharashtra, India
- Occupations: Poet, lyricist, playwright, script writer, actor.
- Writing career
- Language: Marathi
- Period: 1998–present
- Website: www.guruthakur.in

Guru Thakur is an Indian poet, lyricist, scriptwriter, actor and playwright from Mumbai, known for his contributions in Marathi and Hindi film industry.

== Early life ==
Born in Mumbai, Maharashtra, Guru started his career at the age of 19 as a political cartoonist at Marathi weekly Marmik.

== Career as scriptwriter ==
Guru Thakur has written dialogues/scripts for films Aga Bai Arrecha!, Natarang, Bhikari and Narbachi Wadi.

== Awards and nominations ==
Guru Thakur has won many awards and honours including:

- 2022 शांताबाई शेळके स्मृती पुरस्कार 2022
- 2022 Aarti Prabhu award 2022
- 2021 Planet Marathi Filmfare award 2021 – Best Lyrics for the song "Kona Mage Bhirbhirta" from the film Preetam
- 2013 Ma. Ta. Sanman Award as Best Lyricist for the song "Bagh Ughadun Daar" from the film Bharatiya
- 2010 BIG FM BIG Lyricist Award for Song "Khel Mandla" from Natarang
- 2010 Zee Gaurav Award as Best Lyricist for the song "Khel Mandala" from the film Natarang
- 2010 Ma. Ta. Sanman Award as Best Lyricist for the song "Khel Mandala" from the film Natarang
- 2010 Chitrapati V Shantaram Award as Best Lyricist for the song "Khel Mandala" from the film Natarang
- 2010 Saraswat Chaitanya Gaurav Puraskar
- 2010 Nomination at Zee Gaurav Awards for Best Lyricist for the song "He Raje Ji Ra Ji" from the film Mi Shivajiraje Bhosale Boltoy!
- 2009 Indradhanu Yuvonmesh Puraskar for Song writing
- 2009 Nomination at 46th Maharashtra Rajya Chitrapat Puraska for Best Dialogue for the film Marmabandh
- 58th Maharashtra state film award for best lyrics for film Baaplyok

== Work list ==
=== Films ===
- Aga Bai Arrecha! (2004)
- Natarang (2010)
- Kshanbhar Vishranti (2010)
- Ani... Dr. Kashinath Ghanekar (2018)
- Chandramukhi (2022)
- Maharashtra Shahir (2023)
- Phulrani (2023) as writer
- Songya (2023) as lyricist
- Panchak (2024)
- Banjara (2025)
- Aali Mothi Shahani (2026)
- Aadi Anant (2026)
- Maitreyaa (2026)
