= Priyanka Barve =

Indian playback singer and actress (born 1990)

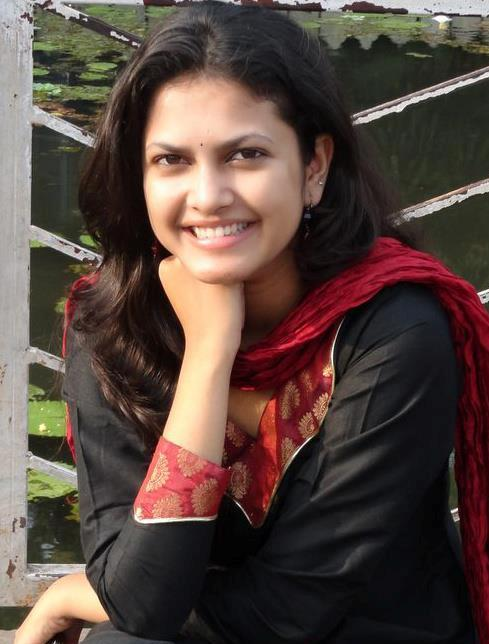

Background information
- Born: 10 April 1990 (age 36)
- Origin: Pune, Maharashtra, India
- Genres: Folk, Hindustani classical
- Occupations: Singer
- Instruments: Vocals

Priyanka Barve is an Indian playback singer and actress. Barve has sung songs in Marathi, Hindi and in some other Indian languages, however she is most active in the Marathi industry. Barve is known for playing Anarkali in Feroz Khan's Broadway adaptation of Mughal E Azam. She Won Maharashtra State Film Award for Best Female Playback Singer at 56th Maharashtra State Film Awards for Song "Kalokhachya watevarti" From Film Bandishala.

== Early life ==
Priyanka is from Pune, India. Priyanka comes from a musical family. She is a granddaughter of veteran vocalists Padmakar and Malati Pande-Barve. Her grandmother guided her in classical singing.

== Career ==
Since 17, Priyanka has been singing professionally. In Marathi films, Barve is a singer and she is credited in the film's music department. Barve has sung songs for many Marathi Films such as Double Seat, Mumbai-Pune-Mumbai 2, Ajintha, Online Binline, Rama Madhav, Bandishala and Lost & Found.

She has also sung for Marathi TV serial's title track, such as Mala Sasu Havi and Ithech Taka Tambu. One of the leading music companies, Sagarika Music, launched her video singles "Patch Up", "Premala", and "Tuzyasave Tuzyavina".

Priyanka is married to Sarang Kulkarni and together they have a musical channel PriyaRang where they collaborate with other musicians and artists to produce fusion music albums.

== TV serial songs ==
- Mala Sasu Havi - Zee Marathi
- Assa Sasar Surekh Baai - Colors Marathi
- Swamini - Colors Marathi
- Swabhiman – Shodh Astitvacha - Star Pravah

== Filmography ==
- 2013 Lagna Pahave Karun (acting) in role of Madhura Godbole
- 2014 Rama Madhav as a playback singer
- 2015 Biker's Adda - as playback singer.
- 2016 702 Dixits
- 2019 Krutant - as playback singer.
- 2019 Anandi Gopal as playback singer

== Awards ==
- Maharashtra State Film Award for Best Female Playback Singer for song Kalokhachya watevarti from the Film Bandishala
- Nominated - Zee Chitra Gaurav Puraskar for Best Playback Singer – Female For Song Ushashi Gandha From the Movie Kondan.
- Mata Sanman 2021 for song "Waata Waata Ga" From Film Anandi Gopal
- Nominated - Zee Chitra Gaurav Puraskar for Best Playback Singer – Female for song Bindiya Le gayi from film Me Vasantrao
- Nominated - Fakt Marathi Cine Sanman for Best Playback Singer Female for song Bindiya Le gayi from film Me Vasantrao
