= Natarang =

2010 marathi film directed by Ravi Jadhav

- Theatrical poster for Natarang
- Directed by: Ravi Jadhav
- Screenplay by: Ravi Jadhav
- Story by: Anand Yadav
- Based on: Natarang by Anand Yadav
- Produced by: Zee Talkies; Nikhil Sane; Amit Phalke; Meghana Jadhav
- Starring: Atul Kulkarni; Sonalee Kulkarni; Kishor Kadam; Vibhavari Deshpande; Priya Berde
- Cinematography: Mahesh Limaye
- Edited by: Jayant Jathar
- Music by: Ajay–Atul
- Production companies: Zee Talkies; Athaansh Communications
- Distributed by: Sadik Chitalikar (Zee Talkies)
- Release date: 1 January 2010
- Running time: 120 minutes
- Country: India
- Language: Marathi
- Box office: ₹16 crore (US$1.7 million) (lifetime)

Natarang, also spelled Natrang (Marathi: नटरंग, an ornamental word for "artist", especially a theatre artist), is a 2010 Indian Marathi-language drama film directed by debutant Ravi Jadhav and starring Atul Kulkarni and Sonalee Kulkarni. Composer duo Ajay–Atul composed the original score and songs of the film.

Based on Natarang, 1978 Marathi novel by Anand Yadav, the film depicts the journey of a young artist in overcoming hurdles in the form of family, friends and society to finally realise the unthinkable dream. Set in the 1970s, in a village in Maharashtra, Natarang highlights the emotions related to gender bias and the sacrifices of an artiste for the love of his art.

== Plot ==
Gunvantrao Kagalkar aka Guna, a poor village labourer, nurtures an obsession for Tamasha - a popular theatrical folk art form of Maharashtra. Unforeseen circumstances result in loss of his job as a labourer and lead to him setting up a theatre company along with his friend and mentor Pandoba. Guna is convinced that his troupe cannot take off unless it has a female dancer. After painstaking search, Pandoba finds Naina, the daughter of his former lover Yamunabai, who is willing to dance for the company on the condition that it has a "Nachya", a "pansy" character, a man who acts in an effeminate manner. As no one is willing to take up the role, due to the eunuch taboo, Guna takes it upon himself to play the character. The strongly built Guna takes up the challenge of doing the role due to his passion for the art.

Despite lack of support from his family, Guna works hard to get the role right, and his play becomes successful in a very short while. However, due to their success, the play gets entangled in the power struggle between two local politicians who wish to use its success for political mileage. Meanwhile, Guna's father dies in his village, and his wife and son are subject to harassment from other villagers. Rival political gangs attack Guna's play and torch his theater. Guna is accused of being a eunuch and gang-raped. However, despite being rejected by his family and discouraged by his friends, Guna continues with his stage career, where he is joined only by Naina. It is implied that Guna and Naina marry, and that their play gathers national and international fame. The film ends with an aged Guna, now addressed as Gunvantrao Kagalkar, winning the lifetime achievement award at a major awards ceremony.

== Cast ==
- Atul Kulkarni as Gunvantrao "Guna" Kagalkar.
- Sonalee Kulkarni as Naina Kolhapurkarin, the lead dancer in Guna's troupe.
- Vibhavari Deshpande as Daarki Kagalkar, Guna's traditional wife who is displeased about his involvement in the Tamasha.
- Kishor Kadam as Pandoba, Guna's friend and mentor.
- Priya Berde as Yamunabai, Nayna's mother and Pandoba's former love interest.
- Guru Thakur as Shirpat Rao
- Nandkishor Chaughule as Vishnu
- Siddheshwar Zadbuke as Dhamodhay
- Milind Shinde as Mr. Mane
- Amruta Khanvilkar in a special appearance in the song Wajle Ki Bara.

== Adaptation ==
The film is a cinematic adaptation of the Marathi novel named Natarang by Anand Yadav. Yadav initially expressed qualms about entrusting a debutant director with the film adaptation of his novel, however he was convinced by Ravi Jadhav's study and understanding of the novel. Yadav later expressed satisfaction over the film.

Yadav's 1978 novel was earlier adapted to a theater production, whose performance however "caused pains to the author." There were plans for a film adaptation starring Ganpat Patil as Guna and Nilu Phule as Pandoba, but these did not work out.

== Release ==
Natarang was released in a grand premiere at the Cinemax Multiplex in Andheri, Mumbai on New Year's Day 2010. The premiere was attended by luminaries from both the Marathi and the Bollywood film industries. It was the first time a Marathi film was released in a grand premiere.

It was re-released on popular demand with English subtitles on 22 January. It has been the highest-grossing film as of 2017.

== Soundtrack ==
The original and the background scores were composed by Ajay Atul, based on the song lyrics by Guru Thakur. The script and story of the film demands period compositions and traditional dance numbers as in Lavani and Gavalan. Vijay Chavan received special accolades for his performance on the dholki.

Natarang

Soundtrack album by Ajay Atul
- Released: 1 January 2010
- Genre: Feature film soundtrack
- Producers: Nikhil Sane; Amit Phalke; Meghana Jadhav

=== Tracklist ===
Track #	Song	Singer(s)
1	"Natarang Ubha"	Ajay–Atul and chorus
2	"Kagal Gavcha Guna"	Ajay Gogavale
3	"Wajle Ki Bara"	Bela Shende and chorus
4	"Achuk Padli Thingi"	Ajay Gogavale
5	"Khel Mandala"	Ajay Gogavale
6	"Petla Gadi"	Ajay Gogavale
7	"Kashi Mi Jau Mathurechya Bajari"	Bela Shende, Ajay Gogavale and chorus
8	"Apsara Aali"	Bela Shende, Ajay–Atul

== Reception ==
Natarang was screened in the Mumbai Academy of the Moving Image film festival, and the Pune International Film Festival. It was the only Indian film to be selected in the "Above the cut" category in MAMI. It was selected as the opening film in the Asian Film Festival in Kolhapur.

The film won seven awards at the annual Zee Gaurav Awards ceremony, including best director for Ravindra Jadhav, best music composition for Ajay–Atul and best supporting actor for Kishor Kadam.

Although the Lāvaṇī dance sequences were well received by the audiences, they were criticized by traditional Lāvaṇī performers and academics as having an item song slant. Critics have especially targeted the "provocative dress style" of Sonalee Kulkarni and Amruta Khanvilkar, saying that it runs contrary to traditional, conservative Lāvaṇī costume. In a 2014 interview, Atul Kulkarni said, "I’ve always loved doing roles which frighten me as to how am I going to do it!! Natarang was a perfect example. I am must confess that this role and the script has challenged me the most so far.".

=== Box office ===
Natarang opened to a successful run statewide and earned ₹60 million in the first two weeks and ₹70 million by third week. Overall, Marathi films earned ₹200 million in the first quarter of 2010, outperforming Bollywood in both box office collection and critical acclaim. The films Natarang, Mahesh Manjrekar's Shikshanachya Aaicha Gho and Paresh Mokashi's Harishchandrachi Factory themselves collected more than ₹160 million at the box office.

== Participation in film festivals ==
- MAMI – Mumbai Film Festival.
- Goa Film Festival
- Third Eye – ASEAN Film Festival.
- Participated in PIFF (Pune Film Fest).
- 33rd Göteborg Fest 2010
- Munich Film Festival 2010

== Awards ==
- Participated in MAMI (Mumbai Academy of the Moving Image festival) & received awards in "Above The Cut" category
- Sant Tukaraam Award for the Best Film in PIFF (Pune International Film Fest)
- Got 7 awards out of 16 nominations for Zee Gaurav Award 2010
- Best Director – Ravi Jadhav – Zee Gaurav Award 2010
- Best Music Director – Ajay Atul – Zee Gaurav Award 2010
- Best Lyrics – Guru Thakur – Zee Gaurav Award 2010 – "Khel Mandla"
- Best Playback Singer Male – Ajay Gogavale – Zee Gaurav Award 2010 – "Khel Mandla"
- Best Playback Singer Female – Bela Shende – Zee Gaurav Award 2010 – "Wajle Ki Bara"
- Best Supporting Actor – Kishor Kadam – Zee Gaurav Award 2010
- Best Choreography – Phulwa Khamkar – Zee Gaurav Award 2010 – "Apsara Aali"
- Best Music Director – Ajay Atul – V Shantaram awards 2010
- Best Background Score – Ajay Atul – V Shantaram awards 2010
- Best Lyrics – Guru Thakur – V Shantaram awards 2010 – "Khel Mandla"
- Best Playback Singer Male – Ajay Gogavale – V Shantaram awards 2010 – "Khel Mandla"
- Best Playback Singer Female – Bela Shende – V Shantaram awards 2010 – Kashi Mi Jau Mathurechya Bajari
- Best Choreography – Phulwa Khamkar – V Shantaram awards 2010 – "Apsara Aali"
- Best Playback Singer Male – Ajay Gogavale – BIG FM awards 2010 – "Khel Mandla"
- Best Playback Singer Female – Bela Shende – BIG FM awards 2010 – "Apsara Aali"
- Best Lyrics – Guru Thakur – BIG FM awards 2010 – "Khel Mandla"
- Best Song Of The Year – Music: Ajay Atul – BIG FM awards 2010 – "Apsara Aali"
- Best Music Director – Ajay Atul – BIG FM awards 2010
- Best Marathi Film Rajat Kamal Award – National Film Awards
- Atul Kulkarni nominated for Best Performance By An Actor Asia Pacific Screen Awards 2010

== See also ==
- Pheta, traditional turban worn in Maharashtra, India
