= Phuntroo =

2016 film directed by Sujay Dahake

- Theatrical release poster
- Directed by: Sujay Dahake
- Written by: Sujay Dahake
- Screenplay by: Sujay Dahake
- Produced by: Dhananjay Singh Masoom, Rabindra Choubey
- Starring: Ketaki Mategaonkar; Madan Deodhar
- Cinematography: Archana Borhade
- Edited by: B. Mahanteshwar
- Music by: Hrishikesh-Saurabh-Jasraj; Score: Saket Kanetkar
- Production companies: Eros International; Spice Studios & Entertainment Pvt Ltd; V.Patke Films Production
- Distributed by: Eros International
- Release date: 11 March 2016
- Country: India
- Language: Marathi

Phuntroo is a 2016 Indian Marathi language Science fiction film, directed by Sujay Dahake and produced by Krishika Lulla and Dhananjay Singh Masoom under the banner Eros International. This is third movie by Sujay Dahake after successful debut film Shala and Ajoba. The film stars Ketaki Mategaonkar and Madan Deodhar in lead roles. The supporting cast features Shivraj Waichal, Shivani Rangole, Ruturaj Shinde, Anshuman Joshi and Rohit Nikam.

== Plot ==
Vira is a mad genius who is deeply love struck on Anaya. Faced with utter rejection from the love of his life, he creates a breakthrough invention that will cure his loneliness.

== Cast ==
- Ketaki Mategaonkar as Ananya/Phuntroo
- Madan Deodhar as Vira
- Shivani Rangole
- Mohan Agashe
- Shivraj Waichal
- Ruturaj Shinde
- Anshuman Joshi
- Rohit Nikam

== Reception ==
The movie received a mixed to positive response largely praised for handling a subject hitherto not projected earlier in Marathi cinema, rather than for its storyline. Mihir Bhanage of Times of India wrote "The film has its flaws. It leaves quite a few questions unanswered and is unnecessarily stretched towards the end. Despite that, 'Phuntroo' is entertaining and will surely strike a chord with the younger lot. The film is a good weekend watch." Ganesh Matkari of Pune Mirror wrote "In my opinion, Phuntroo is easily his (Director Sujay Dahake) best work to date and it shows great promise. The film is technically strong and a lot of thought has gone into the visual aspect of the storytelling. Although the film has sci-fi elements, it's ideal to look at from the romantic angle. It will help you stay with the film even when science goes for a toss. My advice is to keep your expectations in check, and you are all set to enjoy Phuntroo.
