= Timepass 3 =

2022 Indian romantic comedy drama film

- Theatrical release poster
- Directed by: Ravi Jadhav
- Written by: Priyadarshan Jadhav; Ravi Jadhav
- Screenplay by: Priyadarshan Jadhav
- Produced by: Meghana Jadhav
- Starring: Hruta Durgule; Prathamesh Parab; Bhalchandra Kadam; Sanjay Narvekar; Vaibhav Mangle
- Cinematography: Lawrence D'Cunha
- Edited by: Jayant Jathar
- Music by: Amitraj
- Production companies: Zee Studios; Athaansh Communications
- Distributed by: Zee Studios
- Release date: 29 July 2022
- Running time: 122 minutes
- Country: India
- Language: Marathi
- Budget: est.₹8–10 crore

Timepass 3 is a 2022 Indian Marathi-language romantic comedy film directed by Ravi Jadhav and produced by Meghana Jadhav under the banner of Athaansh Communications. The third installment in Timepass franchise, starring Prathamesh Parab, Hruta Durgule and Bhalchandra Kadam in the leading roles, while Sanjay Narvekar and Vaibhav Mangle in supporting roles.

Timepass 3 was theatrically released on 29 July 2022.

== Plot ==
After finally passing his 12th exam, Dagdu Parab is ready to start fresh after taking admission in Science College. His bonding with classmate Pallavi is also blooming.

== Cast ==
- Prathamesh Parab as Dagdu Shantaram Parab
- Hruta Durgule as Pallavi Dinkar Patil
- Sanjay Narvekar as Dinkar Patil
- Bhau Kadam as Shantaram Parab
- Vaibhav Mangle as Madhav Lele
- Rakesh Bhavsar
- Samir Choughule as College principal
- Manmeet Pem as Balbharti
- Anvita Phaltankar as Chanda
- Onkar Raut as Komdya
- Jayesh Chavan as Malaria
- Prashant Tapasvi as College peon

== Reception ==
=== Critical reception ===
The film received mixed response from critics.

Kalpeshraj Kubal of Maharashtra Times rated three stars out of five stars gave positive review. Mihir Bhanage of The Times of India rates two and half stars out of five wrote "if a light-hearted cinema outing is what you are looking at, this is a decent bet." Johnson Thomas of Filmibeat gave same rating. Shahin Irani of OTTPlay gave two and half stars out of five stars wrote "In trying to keep the flavour of the franchise alive, Timepass 3 has become a little offensive and too old for the jokes. Barring those scenes, the movie is a ride which hopes to entertain you. It is only but a good effort today." Chitrali Choghale-Anawkar of Lokmat gave 2.5 stars out of five stars wrote "There is a distinct twist in the movie at the very end and it definitely keeps the curiosity stretched and the movie gives something as it goes. Timepass 3 definitely makes its timepass due to the cast and the light-hearted humor in the story and some new characters." Salonee Mistry of Pune Times Mirror gave 1.5 rating and wrote "Timepass 3 is a no-brainer entertainment watch, packed with slapstick comedy that borders on being unfunny at times."
