= Hruta Durgule =

Indian actress (born 1993)

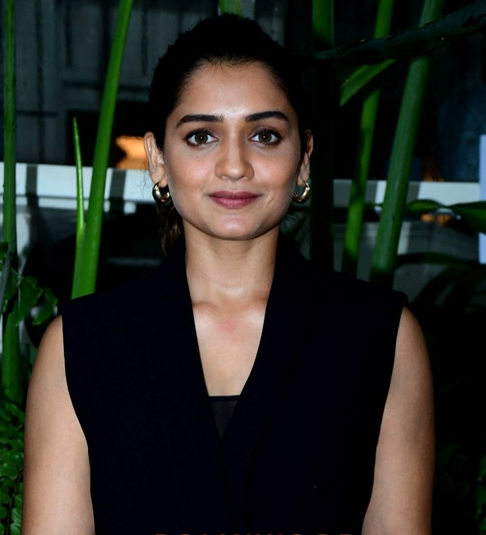
- Durgule in 2024
- Born: 12 September 1993 (age 33); Ratnagiri, Maharashtra
- Education: Ramnarain Ruia College
- Occupation: Actress
- Years active: 2012–present
- Known for: Durva; Phulpakharu; Man Udu Udu Jhala
- Spouse: Prateek Shah (m. 2022)
- Father: Dilip Durgule

Hruta Durgule (born 12 September 1993) is an Indian actress who predominantly works in Marathi television and film productions. She is the recipient of several accolades, including two Filmfare Marathi Awards, and has established herself as one of the most popular Marathi actresses.

She made her television debut with Star Pravah's Durva (2013). She made her big-screen debut with Ananya. She rose to prominence with her portrayal of Vaidehi in Zee Yuva's Phulpakharu.

In 2020, she hosted Sony Marathi's singing reality show Singing Star. She has also played the character of Deepika Deshpande in Zee Marathi's Man Udu Udu Jhala.

== Early life ==
Hruta Durgule was born on 12 September 1993. She is originally from Ratnagiri but brought up in Mumbai and completed education from Ramnarain Ruia College, Mumbai. For now, she lives in Thane.

== Personal life ==
Hruta married TV and film director – Prateek Shah on 18 May 2022.

== Career ==
Durgule started her career with Pudhcha Paaul as an assistant director where she learnt that Rasika Deodhar (casting director) was searching new faces for her upcoming show & she auditioned for the titular role after which she was selected in Durva that aired on Star Pravah. In 2017, she starred in Phulpakharu, that aired on Zee Yuva, which lasted for about 2.5 years. In 2018, She began playing a role in drama Dada Ek Good News Aahe, alongside Umesh Kamat, Rishi Manohar and Aarti More. The play is produced by Priya Bapat. She played the character of Mrunmayee (aka Chiu) in Strawberry Shake. The short film was released on ZEE5 Premium amidst the COVID-19 pandemic.

In 2020, she hosted the show Singing Star, which aired on Sony Marathi. Singing Star was her debut performance as a host.

Durgule debuted in the Marathi film industry with Ananya produced by Ravi Jadhav. The film released on 22 July 2022. She is also a part of a new web series, alongside Suvrat Joshi, named Duet. Duet is yet to release. She was also seen in Man Udu Udu Jhala, which aired on Zee Marathi from 2021 to 2022, portraying the role of Deepika Deshpande. She was also seen in the Marathi movie Timepass 3, which released on 29 July 2022.

== Media image ==
In 2019, she was described as the most attractive women of Marathi Television. She was ranked first in The Times of India's Top 15 most desirable women in Marathi television 2018 and she was ranked second in The Times of India's 2020. She is one of the most popular Marathi television actresses.

She is well known TV serial actress in Maharashtra and known as a "Maharashtrachi Crush" in marathi industry. She is first in Top 5 Marathi television actress in 2022. She ranked 9th in Top 10 Marathi actresses in 2023.

== Filmography ==
=== Films ===
Key
†	Denotes films that have not yet been released

Year	Movie	Role	Language	Notes	Ref.
2018	Sugar n Salt	Riya	Hindi	Short film	
2020	Strawberry Shake	Mrunmayee/ Chiu	Marathi	Short film	
2022	Ananya	Ananya Deshmukh	Marathi		
2022	Timepass 3	Pallavi Dinkar Patil	Marathi		
2023	Circuitt	Aarohi	Marathi		
2024	Kanni	Kalyani Revandikar	Marathi		
2025	Aarpar	Prachi Dixit	Marathi		
2025	Uttar	Kshipra	Marathi		
2026	Aali Mothi Shahani	Gargi Kamat	Marathi		

=== Television ===
Year	Show	Role(s)	Notes	Channel	Ref.
2012	Pudhcha Paaul	—N/a	Assistant director	Star Pravah	
2013–2016	Durva	Durva Patil-Sane	Debut series/Lead role	Star Pravah	
2017–2019	Phulpakharu	Vaidehi Inamdar-Rege	Lead role	Zee Yuva	
2020	Singing Star	Host	Season 1	Sony Marathi	
2021–2022	Man Udu Udu Jhala	Deepika Deshpande- Salgaokar	Lead role	Zee Marathi	

=== Stage ===
Year	Play	Role	Language	Ref.
2018	Dada Ek Good News Aahe	Namita	Marathi	
2025	Tharlay Forever	Meera Desai Palkar	Marathi	

=== Web series ===
Year	Series	Role	Director	Ref.
2021	Duet	Aditi	Shoneel Yallattikar	
2024	Commander Karan Saxena	ACP Rachna Mahtre	Jatin Satish Wagle	
2026	Aga Aai Aaho Aai	Shreya		

=== Special appearances ===
Year	Title	Role	Ref.
2014	Ye Re Ye Re 15	Guest as Durva	
2015	Chaitra Chahul	Guest host	
2015	Ye Re Ye Re 16	Dance performer	
2016	Star Pravah Ratna Puraskar	Dance performer	
2018	Dance Maharashtra Dance	Guest host	
2020	Chala Hawa Yeu Dya – Hou De Viral	Guest	
2021	Chala Hawa Yeu Dya – Varhaad Nighala Amerikela	Guest as Deepika	
2022	Kitchen Kallakar	Guest as Deepika	
2022	Maharashtrachi Hasyajatra	Herself	
2022	Thipkyanchi Rangoli	Guest as Ananya	
2022	Bus Bai Bas	Herself	

== Awards and nominations ==
Year	Awards	Categories	Shows	Result
2014	Maharashtra Times Sanman Awards	Best Actress – Television	Durva	Nominated
2015	Maharashtra Times Sanman Awards	Best Actress – Television	Durva	Won
2016	16th Sanskruti Kaladarpan Gaurav Rajani	Best Actress on Television	Durva	Nominated
2019	Zee Yuva Sanman	Youthful Face of The Year	Phulpakharu	Won
2019	19th Sanskruti Kaladarpan Gaurav Rajani	Best Actress	Phulpakharu	Won
2019	Second Majja Awards	Outstanding Lead Actress in Drama Series	Phulpakharu	Won
2019	Zee Natya Gaurav Puraskar	Most Natural Performance of The Year	Dada Ek Good News Aahe	Won
2021	Zee Marathi Utsav Natyancha Awards	Best Actress	Man Udu Udu Jhala	Nominated
2021	Zee Marathi Utsav Natyancha Awards	Best Couple	Man Udu Udu Jhala	Won
2021	Zee Marathi Utsav Natyancha Awards	Best ZEE5 Female	Man Udu Udu Jhala	Won
2021	Lokmat Stylish Awards	Most Stylish Actress	Man Udu Udu Jhala	Won
2022	Zee Talkies Comedy Awards	Best Actress	Timepass 3	Nominated
2022	Zee Talkies Comedy Awards	Best Natural Performance Of The Year	Timepass 3	Won
2022	Maharashtracha Favourite Kon?	Favourite Actress	Ananya	Nominated
2022	Maharashtracha Favourite Kon?	Popular Face of the Year	Ananya	Won
2023	Zee Chitra Gaurav Awards	Best Actress	Ananya	Won
2023	7th Filmfare Awards Marathi	Best Actress	Ananya	Nominated
2023	7th Filmfare Awards Marathi	Best Female Debut	Ananya	Won
2023	Fakt Marathi Cine Sanman	Best Actress in a Lead Role	Ananya	Won
2025	Maharashtra State Film Awards	Best Debut Actress	Ananya	Won
