= Vibhavari Apte Joshi =

Indian playback singer

- Born: Pune, Maharashtra, India
- Occupation: Singer
- Years active: 2000–present
- Known for: Guzaarish

Vibhavari Apte Joshi is an Indian singer in Bollywood, and in Marathi and Tamil language films.

== Career ==
She hails from Pune in Maharashtra state of India. She has sung in many Marathi movies, Bollywood movies such as Guzaarish and many other musical albums. Awards won by her include Vidya Pradnya Award from Maharashtra Government in 2013, Stardust New Musical Sensation Award in 2011 and Jio-Mirchi award for Best Female Vocalist in 2016. She is a post graduate in commerce.

She has made performances along with Ilaiyaraaja, Hrishikesh Ranade, Jitendra Abhyankar, Ketaki Mategaonkar, Suvarna Mategaonkar, Prashant Naseri, Madhura Datar etc. She has also performed the TV programs like Saregama. She is also a part of the musical program by Hridaynath Mangeshkar named Bhavsargam.

== Popular songs ==
- "Natyas naav apulya" : Marathi movie: Natasamrat.
- Saiba
- Ugavali Chandrakor
- Tu Buddhi de (Marathi movie: Dr. Prakash Baba Amte)
- Vidnyanroop Ganesh
- Disha Dishatun Chaitanyache
- "Katthi Vetti" (with S. P. Balasubrahmanyam in Muthuramalingam) - 2017
- Sutti Penne in Touring Talkies (2015) - Tamil
- Pournami Poove in Rudhramadevi(Tamil)
- Eearamai Earamai in Un Samayal Araiyil
- Galiya Mathali in Oggarane
- Swapnat Aaj Yeta Sur Taal Chedale
- Thedi Thedi in 60 Vayadhu Maaniram
- Marudha malli in Marudha

== Accolades ==
Year	Award Ceremony	Category	Film	Song	Result	Reference(s)
2010	Mirchi Music Awards	Upcoming Female Vocalist of The Year	Guzaarish	"Saiba"	Nominated	
2016	Zee Chitra Gaurav Puraskar	Zee Chitra Gaurav Puraskar for Best Playback Singer – Female	Natsamrat	Naatyas Naav Aapulya	Nominated	
