= Shaiju Mathew =

Indian–Canadian author

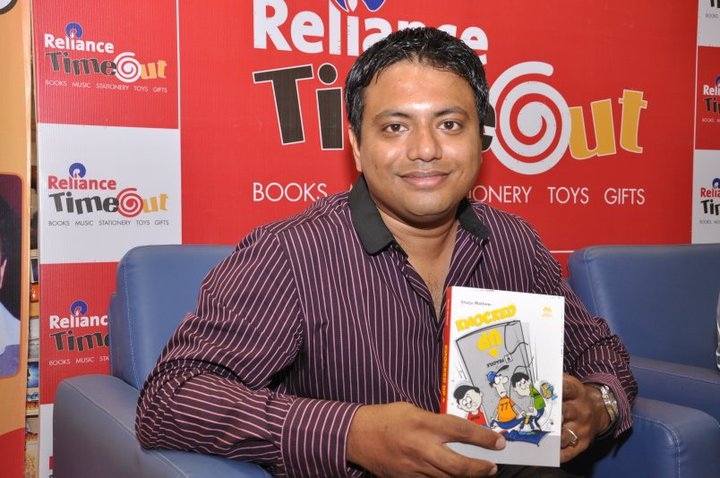
- Mathew at a book release function of Knocked Up at Reliance Timeout Store Pune on 26 September 2010
- Born: Anchal
- Education: St. Joseph's Boys' High School, Pune; Pune University
- Occupations: Novelist, screenplay writer, director
- Writing career
- Language: English
- Genres: Fiction, romance, humour
- Notable works: Knocked Up, Alfie The Elf,A Pocketful Of Sunshine
- Website: www.alfietheelf.com

Shaiju Mathew is an Indian–Canadian author, screenplay writer, movie reviewer and director, known for his 2010 book Knocked Up.

== Personal life ==
Mathew is an alumnus of St. Josephs Boys' High School Khadki, Pune. He studied human resource management at Pune University.

== Career ==
After working as a singer and a screenplay writer Mathew, who moved to Bangalore after university, wrote Knocked Up, a coming of age novel. The book took Mathew 20 days to write and the author drew inspiration from his childhood experiences with his friends. The author also heavily used social media networks such as Facebook and Twitter to design the book's artwork as well as publicize and market the book. Knocked Up is set to become a feature film in Hindi, with Mathew co-producing. A Marathi movie Timepass loosely based on Knocked Up released in February 2014. The film was the highest grossing Marathi film until the release of Lai Bhaari in the same year, which broke its record. Andhra Pori starring Puri Akash son of Puri Jagannadh is also based on Mathew's novel Knocked Up.

In an interview to a popular news paper Mathew said that he is influenced by the works of RK Narayan, Jane Austen, Enid Blyton and Ruskin Bond. He prefers to write simpler stories that common man can identify with. Mathew's next novel is a period drama titled A Pocketful Of Sunshine. Mathew's second book as an author, Alfie The Elf released in 2016. This Christmas release took Mathew 9 days to write. Mathew is also associated with Citadel Cinemas a Bangalore based production house that produced Bangles a malayalam feature film and a short film Oru Thundu Padam starring Aju Varghese. Mathew is also a well known movie critic and writes extensively for various newspapers and magazines apart from his blog www.chaiwithshai.com.

== Bibliography ==
- Knocked Up (2010)
- Alfie The Elf (2016)
- A Pocketful Of Sunshine (2022)

=== Scriptwriting ===
- Pal Do Pal
- Planchette (short film)
- Knocked Up (film)
- Anuradha (Malayalam film)
- Actress (Malayalam film)
- Badaltey Rang (Short film)
- Chakkar Sanjivan Lal's Next (feature film)

== Filmography ==
- Planchette (2013) short film – Director
- Oru Thundu Padam (2013) short film – produced under Citadel Cinemas
- Bangles (2013) feature film – produced under Citadel Cinemas
- Maafinaama (2014) short film – Associate Director
- The Other Side (2014) short film – Co-producer
- Badaltey Rang (2014) short film – writer
- Love Ke Liye (TBA) feature film – writer
- Chakkar (TBA) feature film – co-writer
