= Timepass (film) =

- Theatrical release poster
- Directed by: Ravi Jadhav
- Screenplay by: Ravi Jadhav; Priyadarshan Jadhav
- Story by: Ravi Jadhav inspired from Shaiju Mathew's novel Knocked Up
- Produced by: Zee Talkies; Nikhil Sane
- Starring: Prathamesh Parab; Ketaki Mategaonkar; Bhushan Pradhan; Urmila Kothare
- Cinematography: Vasudeo Rane
- Edited by: Jayant Jathar; Nitesh Rathod
- Music by: Chinar - Mahesh
- Production company: Zee Talkies
- Distributed by: Zee Talkies
- Release date: 3 January 2014
- Running time: 143 minutes
- Country: India
- Language: Marathi
- Budget: ₹2 crore (US$210,000)
- Box office: ₹33 crore (US$3.4 million)

Timepass is a 2014 Indian Marathi-language romantic drama film about teenage love set in the 1990s between Dagadu (Prathamesh Parab) and Prajakta (Ketaki Mategaonkar). It also stars Bhalchandra Kadam, Vaibhav Mangle, Bhushan Pradhan and Urmila Kothare. It was directed by Ravi Jadhav, who has provided prior hits like Balak-Palak, Balgandharva, and Natarang.

The film was the highest grosser of Marathi cinema until its box office record was broken by Ritesh Deshmukh's Lai Bhaari. This film was later remade in Telugu as Andhra Pori. Its sequel Timepass 2 was released on 1 May 2015.

A third part to the film, titled Timepass 3, was announced in 2022. It was directed by Ravi Jadhav under the banner of Athaansh Communications and Zee Studios. Timepass 3 was released on 29 July 2022.

== Plot ==
Everybody from school criticizes Dagdu for his behavior. On the result day, a student insults Dagdu about his failure. Dagdu punished him by making him a "kombada". later, someone informs Dagdu that Shantaram, his father, is looking for him. He goes home with happily. His father beats him up for failing in all subjects and throws him out of the house. His friends console him and advise him to have an affair so that love will blossom in his life. He decides to distribute newspapers, where he meets Madhav Lele. In the college campus he meets Prajakta Lele, daughter of Madhav Lele and vows to have an affair with her. Dagdu follows Prajakta and they start loving each other. Soon Madhav Lele finds out about the affair and separates them. Dagdu promises and says that he'll come back.

== Cast ==
- Prathamesh Parab as Dagadu Parab
- Ketaki Mategaonkar as Prajakta Lele
- Vaibhav Mangle as Madhavrao (Shakal) Lele, Prajakta's father
- Bhalchandra Kadam as Shantaram (Appa) Parab, Dagadu’s father
- Meghana Erande as Anuja Lele, Prajakta's mother
- Urmila Kanitkar as Spruha Kelkar
- Bhushan Pradhan as Vallabh Lele, Prajakta’s brother
- Aarti Wadgabalkar as Manda Parab, Dagadu’s sister
- Manmeet Pem as Balbharti, Dagadu’s friend
- Sai Gharpure as Prajakta's friend
- Onkar Raut as Kombada, Dagadu’s friend
- Anvita Phaltankar as Chanda Tare
- Jayesh Chavan as Malaria, Dagdu's friend
- Uday Sabnis as Prajakta's uncle
- Shibani Dandekar as Dancer in 'Hi Poli Saajuk Tupatali'

== Soundtrack ==
Timepass 2

Soundtrack album by Chinar - Mahesh
- Released: 30 December 2013
- Genre: Film soundtrack
- Length: 31:53
- Label: Zee Music Marathi

Chinar - Mahesh chronology
Timepass 2 (2013)	Timepass 2 (2014)
External audio
- Audio Jukebox on YouTube

The lyrics for the film are penned by Mangesh Kangane and Kshitij Patwardhan with music composed by Chinar - Mahesh.

=== Track listing ===
Timepass
No.	Title	Singer(s)	Length
1.	"Mala Ved Lagale"	Ketaki Mategaonkar, Swapnil Bandodkar	4:20
2.	"Phulpakharu"	Swapnil Bandodkar	4:34
3.	"Daatale Reshmi"	Mahalaxmi Iyer, Chinar Kharkar	5:21
4.	"Hi Poli Saajuk Tupatli"	Reshma Sonawane	4:37
5.	"Prem Ki Yatana"	Chinar Kharkar	5:15
Total length:			31:53

== Reception ==
Aparna Phadke of The Times of India praised the performances of the lead actors and commented that the film is "worth a watch", and Shakti Salgaokar of Daily News and Analysis called the picture "an entertaining experience"; both reviewers awarded the film 4/5.

== Box office ==
Timepass opened to thunderous response at Box Office in Maharashtra. It collected ₹6.5 crore (US$670,000) in its 3-day weekend and ₹10 crore (US$1.0 million) in first five days of its release. First week collections stood at ₹13.8 crore (US$1.4 million). In two weeks it surpassed the collections of Duniyadari and became highest-grossing movie in Marathi until its record was broken by Lai Bhaari. It ended up collecting ₹33 crore (US$3.4 million) at the box office in Maharashtra.

== See also ==
Highest grossing Marathi films
