= Timepass 2 =

- Theatrical release poster
- Directed by: Ravi Jadhav
- Screenplay by: Ravi Jadhav
- Story by: Ravi Jadhav; Kshitij Patwardhan; Priyadarshan Jadhav
- Produced by: Nikhil Sane (Essel Vision); Meghana Jadhav (Athaansh Communications)
- Starring: Priyadarshan Jadhav; Priya Bapat; Prathamesh Parab; Ketaki Mategaonkar; Bhushan Pradhan
- Cinematography: Vasudeo Rane
- Edited by: Jayant Jathar
- Music by: Chinar – Mahesh
- Production company: Essel Vision Productions
- Release date: 1 May 2015
- Running time: 145 minutes
- Country: India
- Language: Marathi
- Box office: ₹31 crore (US$3.2 million)

Timepass 2 (abbreviated as TP2) is a 2015 Indian Marathi-language film directed by Ravi Jadhav. It is the sequel to the 2014 film of the same name. It continues the incomplete lovestory of Dagadu (Rocky) and Prajakta (Praju). The film also stars Bhalchandra Kadam and Vaibhav Mangle. It was directed by Ravi Jadhav.

== Synopsis ==
The story takes place after 15 years with grown up Dagadu (Priyadarshan Jadhav) and Praju (Priya Bapat). Young Dagadu (Prathamesh Parab) is a successful music company owner. Dagadu's Friend Bal Bharati is a successful astrologist, Kombda became a DJ working with Dagadu's music company and Malaria became a politician.

The movie begins with a scene in which Dagadu donates an ambulance for the people in his area, reflecting his caring attitude. After the event, Dagadu's sister suggests that he marry, showing him photos of some girls. Dagdu hesitates as he is still searching for love. He learns that Prajakta (Priya Bapat) is in Kudal, Konkan.

Soon, Prajakta moves to Mumbai to pursue her dreams, however, she still loves Dagadu and is waiting for him to bring her back in his life. Dagadu is still single and waiting for Prajakata, his childhood love. So, the question here is whether the childhood love he had was a timepass or something really serious, which is being answered without ambiguity.

Dagadu is seen walking in a new avatar, dressed like an educated guy to impress and win over Shakal. Meanwhile, Praju who seems to have done well in Mumbai seems to be an item girl called Urvashi. Soon, Urvashi turns back into Praju, meeting Dagadu and soon their lost love returns.

In later events, Prajakta's father, Shakal wants an educated, qualified guy, unlike Dagadu, to marry his daughter. So Dagadu pretends that he is a Researcher working at Bhabha Atomic Research Center, impressing Shakal. He decides to marry him with his daughter, not knowing that he actually is Dagadu. As Prajakta lives in Mumbai he goes there, traveling in the same Jeep as Dagadu. Shakal searches for her, in the apartment, finding that his daughter has changed her name to Urvashi.

Her friend tells Shakal that she has gone for a shoot. Hence, Shakal goes to the location of the shoot, finding that his daughter is dancing for an Item Dance Video in too short clothes. After watching the dance, he is broken completely. He runs to slap her, but Dagadu, stops him, asking him to cool down, but Shakal loses his temper, slaps her and brings her outside the hall. Shakal is completely broken and returns to Kudal. Dagadu, doubting his love, wondering if their relationship was just a waste of time (Timepass) and asks his friends for advice. Kombda advises him to let go of Prajakta, but the teenage Dagadu in his mind reminds him of their true love, then Dagadu decides to marry no one except Prajakta.

== Cast ==
- Priyadarshan Jadhav as Dagadu Shantaram Parab
  - Prathamesh Parab as young Dagadu
- Priya Bapat as Prajakta Madhavrao Lele
  - Ketaki Mategaonkar as young Prajakta
- Vaibhav Mangle as Madhavrao Lele (Shakal)
- Bhalchandra Kadam as Shantaram Parab (Dagadu's father)
- Aarti Wadagbalkar as Manda Shantaram Parab (Dagadu's elder sister)
- Sameer khandekar as balabharati (dagadu's friend)
- Kshitee Jog as chanda (prajakta's friend)
- Sandeep Pathak as Sanjay Mhatre a.k.a. Maleria (Dagadu's friend)
- Bhushan Pradhan as Vallabh Madhavrao Lele (Prajakta's elder brother)
- Urmila Kanitkar as Spruha Vallabh Lele (Vallabh's wife)
- Uday Sabnis as Prajakta's uncle
- Supriya Pathare as Prajakta's aunt
- Meghana Erande-Joshi as Anuja Madhavrao Lele (Prajakta's deceased mother in the photograph)

== Production ==
The Film is produced by Meghana Jadhav under Athaansh Communications and Nikhil Sane by Essel Vision Productions.

== Marketing ==
The film was marketed by Essel Vision and Athaansh Communications. In the final week of March 2015, a grand music launch event was held in Pune, which was later broadcast on Zee Talkies on April 5. Additionally, a pre-release event took place in Pune in early April 2015.

== Soundtrack ==
Timepass 2

Soundtrack album by Chinar–Mahesh
- Released: 6 April 2015
- Genre: Film soundtrack
- Length: 28:47
- Label: Video Palace

Chinar–Mahesh chronology
Timepass (2014)	Timepass 2 (2015)	Story Hai Pan Khari Hai (2015)
External audio
- Audio Jukebox on YouTube

The lyrics for the film are penned by Mangesh Kangane and Kshitij Patwardhan with music composed by Chinar–Mahesh.

=== Track listing ===
All lyrics are written by Mangesh Kangane.

Timepass 2
No.	Title	Lyrics	Singer(s)	Length
1.	"Waou Waou"	Mangesh Kangane	Vishal Dadlani	3:32
2.	"Praju"	Mangesh Kangane	Mahalakshmi Iyer, Rishikesh Kamerkar	5:18
3.	"Tu Mila"	Mangesh Kangane	Shalmali Kholgade, Nikhil D'Souza	5:20
4.	"Madan Pichkari"	Mangesh Kangane	Apeksha Dandekar, Ishq Bector	4:19
5.	"Sunya Sunya"	Mangesh Kangane	Ketaki Mategaonkar, Adarsh Shinde	5:15
6.	"Dagadu Savdhan"	Mangesh Kangane	Rishikesh Kamerkar, Chinar Kharkar, Vivek Naik	2:06
7.	"Timepass"	Mangesh Kangane	Anand Shinde	2:57
Total length:				28:47

== Box office ==
Timepass 2 had record-breaking collections at the box office. It broke the record of highest first-day collections by collecting ₹3.75 crore (US$390,000). It collected ₹3.00 crore (US$310,000) on its second day and ₹4.25 crore (US$440,000) on its third day, thereby collecting ₹11 crore (US$1.1 million) in its opening weekend which was a record at the box office. Timepass 2's first week collections were ₹17.60 crore (US$1.8 million), which was again a first-week record for a Marathi movie. The second weekend collections rose to ₹23.60 crore (US$2.5 million) in Maharashtra alone. The film then slowed down and ended up collecting ₹31 crore (US$3.2 million) at the Maharashtra box office. It still holds the record for highest opening day collection and 2nd highest opening weekend collection till now. It currently stands as the fifth highest grossing Marathi film of all time.

== Critical reception ==
Mihir Bhanage of The Times of India gave the film a rating of 3 out of 5 saying that, "Timepass 2 has a tried and tested love formula that works because of the clever punchlines, songs and funny situations."

== See also ==
- Highest grossing Marathi films
