= Khalid Ke Shivaji =

2025 Indian Marathi-language drama film

- Directed by: Raj Pritam More
- Written by: Kailash Waghmare
- Produced by: Michael Thevar; Sushma Ganvir
- Starring: Krish More; Priyadarshan Jadhav
- Cinematography: Vijay Mishra
- Edited by: Mahanteshwar Bhosage
- Music by: Nishant Ramteke
- Production company: P P Cine Production
- Release dates: November 2025 (IFFI); July 2026 (YouTube)
- Running time: 114 minutes
- Country: India
- Language: Marathi

Khalid Ke Shivaji (originally titled: Khalid Ka Shivaji) is an Indian Marathi-language drama film directed by Raj Pritam More in his feature film debut. The film stars Krish More as Khalid, an 11-year-old Muslim schoolboy who is taunted by his classmates as "Afzal Khan" and begins exploring the history of Chhatrapati Shivaji Maharaj, alongside Sushama Deshpande, Kailash Waghmare, Priyadarshan Jadhav, Bharat Ganeshpure and Snehalata Tagde.

The film was sold at the 2025 Marché du Film through the Maharashtra Film, Theatre and Cultural Development Corporation. It was scheduled for a theatrical release on 8 August 2025, however, on 7 August, the Ministry of Information and Broadcasting suspended its Central Board of Film Certification (CBFC) certificate following protests by groups alleging historical misrepresentation of Shivaji. After a re-certification and several changes, including a title change from Khalid Ka Shivaji to Khalid Ke Shivaji, the film did not receive a theatrical release and instead premiered on digital platforms in July 2026.

== Plot ==
Khalid, a fifth-grade student at a school in a small town in Maharashtra, is fascinated by his history teacher Salve's account of how Chhatrapati Shivaji Maharaj defeated the Bijapur general Afzal Khan. Soon afterwards, a classmate begins bullying him by calling him "Afzal Khan", a nickname that spreads among the other students and leaves Khalid isolated.

Confused by the treatment and questioning whether all Muslims were enemies of Shivaji, Khalid seeks answers from his grandmother, father, teacher and friends. His search for understanding leads him to form an unlikely friendship with a Hindu monk and engage in conversations with his father outside a mosque about faith and humanity. It concludes with Khalid dressing up as Shivaji.

== Cast ==
- Krish More as Khalid
- Sushama Deshpande as Dadi, Khalid's grandmother
- Kailash Waghmare as Salve, Khalid's history teacher
- Priyadarshan Jadhav as Hayyed, Khalid's father
- Bharat Ganeshpure as Shahane, a teacher
- Snehalata Tagde as Ruksana, Khalid's mother

== Production ==
=== Development ===
Raj More, who received the National Film Award for Best Debut Non-Feature Film of a Director for his short film Khisa (2020), conceived the film during the COVID-19 pandemic. The idea originated from a conversation with a Muslim scholar friend, who recounted being bullied during childhood and jokingly referred to as "Afzal Khan". After several financiers declined to back the script, citing its subject matter and timing, More secured funding approximately a year and a half later from Tamil-born American producer Michael Thevar and producer Sushma Ganvir.

=== Filming ===
Principal photography took place in the Akola, Amravati and Nagpur districts of Maharashtra's Vidarbha region. The film was shot in More's hometown of Akola, with approximately 95 per cent of the cast comprising local performers. The title role of Khalid is portrayed by More's son, Krish More.

== Themes ==
The film explores religious polarization in Maharashtra and the communalisation of history through the questions and experiences of a child. The Hindu noted that it presents Shivaji as a symbol of syncretism in a divided society, opening with a bhajan that transitions into the sound of the azaan. More has described the film as a story told from Khalid's perspective rather than a historical drama, explaining that the child's innocence lends relevance to his questions for adult audiences.

== Release ==
=== Festivals ===
In April 2025, Maharashtra's cultural affairs minister Ashish Shelar announced that Khalid Ka Shivaji was among four Marathi films selected for the 2025 Marché du Film marketplace. It was subsequently selected for the Indian Panorama section of the 56th International Film Festival of India (IFFI) and the India Focus section of the 10th Ajanta-Ellora International Film Festival.

=== Planned theatrical release and suspension ===
The Central Board of Film Certification (CBFC) certified the film on 12 November 2024 after the makers incorporated modifications suggested by the board. Its trailer was released on 28 July 2025. The film was scheduled for a theatrical release in approximately 150 theatres across Maharashtra on 8 August 2025; however, the planned release did not take place.

=== Digital release ===
In July 2026, nearly a year after its scheduled theatrical release, Khalid Ke Shivaji became available for paid rental on digital platforms, including YouTube, BookMyShow Stream and Apple TV. More said the makers chose to release the film on YouTube for a rental fee of ₹25 to preserve its dignity following the prolonged dispute.

== Reception ==
=== Critical response ===
Shreyas Pande of The Hindu wrote, "Director Raj Pritam More understands this as he humanises the warrior while exploring the contrasting nature of his legacy, all through the innocent eyes of a child in his feel-good Marathi feature". Keyur Seta of The Common Man Speaks awarded the film 3 out of 5 stars, calling it "Worth watching for its portrayal of current social reality" and noting, "Its biggest triumph is the protagonist’s characterization, which makes you root for him throughout its runtime." Scroll.in observed that "Khalid Ka Shivaji, in its own modest and earnest way, invites viewers to examine how bigotry can begin in the most casual way, and why it needs to be addressed."

=== Accolades ===
Year	Awards	Category	Recipient	Result	Ref
2026	Filmfare Awards Marathi	Best Child Actor	Krish More	Won	

== Controversy ==
=== Objections to the trailer ===
Following the release of the trailer, several right-wing groups objected to the film, alleging that it portrayed Shivaji as "secular" and distorted historical facts. Their objections centred on dialogue and a voiceover claiming that 35 per cent of Shivaji's soldiers were Muslims and that he had built a mosque for his soldiers at Raigad Fort, as well as a line stating that a true king follows the religion of the whole world. The Pune-based Hindu Mahasangh threatened to protest outside theatres unless the film was banned. At the 61st Maharashtra State Film Awards, two men disrupted Chief Minister Devendra Fadnavis's speech to protest against the film.

=== Government action and suspension ===
On 5 August 2025, activist Nilesh Bhise submitted a written complaint to the Maharashtra government alleging that certain dialogues in the trailer were factually incorrect. The following day, state culture secretary Kiran Kulkarni wrote to the Union information and broadcasting secretary, requesting that the CBFC review the film's certification and halt its release, citing the potential for law-and-order problems. Maharashtra's cultural affairs minister Ashish Shelar said the state would seek the film's removal from the Cannes listings. Indian National Congress leader Sachin Sawant criticised the government's move, arguing that it was driven by pressure from right-wing organisations and cited historian G. S. Sardesai in support of the claim that Shivaji had a mosque built for his Muslim soldiers.

On 7 August 2025, the Ministry of Information and Broadcasting issued a notice to the filmmakers seeking evidence in support of the story. Later that day, following a meeting involving state officials, Mumbai police, the CBFC and the director, the ministry invoked Section 6(2) of the Cinematograph Act, 1952, to suspend the film's certificate for one month. The order cited concerns that the film's release during the festive season could affect communal harmony and public peace. The order was published in the official gazette on 20 August 2025.

More defended the film as a story told from a child's perspective rather than a history lesson, acknowledging that the figure cited in the dialogue might have been inaccurate while maintained that Muslims had served in Shivaji's army.

=== Legal challenge ===
More approached the Bombay High Court, challenging the suspension as arbitrary and politically motivated and as a violation of his right to freedom of speech. A division bench comprising Justices Revati Mohite Dere and Neela Gokhale declined to grant immediate relief but directed that the suspension should not be extended without giving the director an opportunity to be heard.

=== Re-certification and aftermath ===
According to More, the filmmakers subsequently obtained a fresh certificate from the CBFC without cuts, although changes were made, including a title change from ''Khalid Ka Shivaji'' to ''Khalid Ke Shivaji''. The dialogue concerning the proportion of Muslims in Shivaji's army was also re-dubbed. More said distributors were reluctant to acquire the film because they feared a backlash, despite many of them not having watched it.
