= Aali Mothi Shahani =

2026 Indian Marathi-language fantasy comedy film

- Directed by: Anand Dilip Gokhale
- Written by: Anand Dilip Gokhale; Dialogues: Niranjan Parandkar
- Produced by: Jaykumar Munot; Isha Muthe; Shruti Sathe; Anand Dilip Gokhale; Amar Melgiri
- Starring: Hruta Durgule; Sarang Sathaye
- Cinematography: Vijay Mishra
- Edited by: Rajesh Rao
- Music by: Pankaj Padghan
- Production companies: Fine Brew Productions; True Hope Film Works
- Distributed by: AA Films
- Release date: 2 October 2026
- Running time: 146 minutes
- Country: India
- Language: Marathi

Aali Mothi Shahani (transl. Here Comes the Smart-Aleck) is a 2026 Indian Marathi-language fantasy comedy-drama film written and directed by Anand Dilip Gokhale and produced under the banners of Fine Brew Productions and True Hope Film Works. The film stars Hruta Durgule and Sarang Sathaye in the lead roles, alongside Guru Thakur, Rujuta Deshmukh and Suhita Thatte. The story follows an eleven-year-old girl who prays to Lord Ganesha to make her grow up instantly.

The film was announced on the occasion of Dussehra in October 2025, and principal photography began in Goa the following month. Aali Mothi Shahani was theatrically released on 2 October 2026 and received mixed reviews from critics.

== Plot ==
Gargi Kamat is an eleven-year-old girl who envies the freedom and privileges enjoyed by her elder sister Gauri, and wishes to grow up quickly so that her parents will allow her to do the same things. During the Ganpati festival, her grandmother tells her while putting her to bed that only Lord Ganesha has the power to make her grow up. The next day, Gargi skips school after missing her bus and goes to a nearby Ganpati temple, where she vows to keep circling the shrine until the deity grants her wish.

Gargi's life subsequently takes an unexpected turn, and she forms a friendship with a man named Atharva Shastri, which changes the way she sees the world. The story follows her journey through family relationships, friendship and faith as she tries to understand what growing up really means.

== Cast ==
- Hruta Durgule as Gargi Kamat
  - Maitreyee Datye as young Gargi
- Sarang Sathaye as Atharva Shastri
- Guru Thakur as Prakash Kamat
- Rujuta Deshmukh as Gargi's mother
- Suhita Thatte as Gargi's grandmother
- Vishakha Naik as Gauri
- Sanjay Khapre as IPS Sanjay Sawant
- Prashant Kulkarni
- Subodh Bhave as Kiran Borkar
- Archana Nipankar
- Umesh Jadhav
- Uday Nene
- Rishi Saxena

== Production ==
=== Development ===
The project was officially announced on Dussehra in October 2025, with the makers revealing that Hruta Durgule and Sarang Sathaye would be paired together on screen for the first time. Anand Dilip Gokhale stated that the story originated from the simple, innocent childhood desire to grow up quickly.

=== Filming ===
Principal photography commenced in Goa in November 2025.

== Soundtrack ==
Aali Mothi Shahani

Soundtrack album by Pankaj Padghan
- Released: October 1, 2026
- Genre: Feature film soundtrack
- Length: 17:30
- Language: Marathi
- Label: Everest Marathi

The music and background score of the film were composed by Pankaj Padghan, with lyrics written by Guru Thakur and dance choreography by Umesh Jadhav. The first single, "Ganesh Vandana", was released on 11 September 2026, a few days before Ganesh Chaturthi, followed by "Phoolpakhroo" on 24 September and "Bonita Bonita" within a week.

Track listing
No.	Title	Singer(s)	Length
1.	"Phoolpakhroo"	Apurva Nisshad	4:00
2.	"Bonita Bonita"	Siddhant Bhosle, Ketaki Mategaonkar	3:10
3.	"Sobati"	Sayalie Pankaj	3:36
4.	"Ganesh Vandana"	Abhay Jodhpurkar	3:35
5.	"Sukhkarta Dukharta"	Atharva Katkar	3:09
Total length:			17:30

== Release ==
The official teaser of the film was released on 1 September 2026, along with the announcement of its release date. The trailer was released later that month. The film was theatrically released on 2 October 2026, and was distributed through AA Films.

== Reception ==
=== Critical response ===
Rajiv Vijayakar of South Asian Herald described the film as "average fantasy fable" and noted, "Aali Mothi Shahani delivers apt homilies to pre-teens and even teenagers today who are in a hurry to have experiences beyond their ages." Sujit Shirke of Lokmat gave it 3 out of 5 stars, remarking, "at some places, the director seems to be exhausted while putting the story together." Ashish Ningurkar of My Mahanagar observed, "Creating a different story world from a simple idea, adding entertainment to that story and reconnecting adults with their own childhood through it, is the real strength of the film."
