= Priyadarshan Jadhav =

Indian actor and director

- Born: 29 April 1980 (age 46); Kolhapur, Maharashtra, India
- Other names: Darshan, Dagdu
- Occupations: Actor; director; producer; screenwriter
- Years active: 1989–present
- Known for: Timepass 2
- Spouse: Vaibhavi Gupte (m. 2009)

Priyadarshan Jadhav (born 29 April 1980) is a Marathi actor, director, producer and screenwriter. He is known for his role in Ravi Jadhav's Timepass 2 (2015) as Dagadu.

== Personal life ==
Priyadarshan was born on 29 April 1980 in Kolhapur. He currently lives in Mumbai with his wife Vaibhavi Gupte. He has a daughter Iraa and a newly born son Asim.

== Career ==
Jadhav made his acting debut in Vijay Aso (2012). He was an actor and writer for the film Timepass 2, released in May 2015. He was in lead role for this movie along with Priya Bapat. He has also written screenplay for the prequel Timepass.

Priyadarshan has played pivotal roles in films like Chintoo 2: Khajinyachi Chittarkatha in 2013 and Vijay Aso in 2012. He was the associate director for the film Hapus in 2010. 2013 released Chintoo 2: Khajinyachi Chittarkatha was also one of the opportunities to prove his acting. Portraying comic roles became his forte and he played entertained the audience in films like Jai Maharashtra Dhaba Bhatinda in 2012. Halal is Chinmay's Marathi film. Halal is directed by Shivaji Lotan Patil and produced by Amol Kagne. He won the Best Supporting actor for Halal at the 2017 Marathi Zee Cine Awards.

== Drama ==
He is a director for plays in Marathi namely Jago Mohan Pyare with almost 750 shows, Dillichi Killi, the satirical comedy Pyaar Kiya To Darna Kya, Timepass (play), Cheharapheri, Gandhi Adava Yeto, Moruchi Mavshi, Mr. and Mrs., Susaat and Mumbaiche Kawale. He has been a prominent Theatre Actor with plays like Tumcha Mulga Karto Kay, Susaat, Moruchi Mavshi, Vichha Mazi Puri Kara, Shantata:Court Chalu Aahe, Mr. and Mrs., Gandhi Adava Yeto, Cheharapheri, Popatpanchi, Mumbaiche Kawale, Timepass, Pyaar Kiya To Darna Kya, Dillichi Killi, Sagale Ubhe Aahet, Nava Gadi Nava Rajya.

== Filmography ==
- 2003 Jatra
- 2007 Hyancha Kahi Nem Nahi
- 2010 Haapus
- 2012 Vijay Aso
- 2013 Jai Maharashtra Dhaba Bhatinda
- 2013 Chintoo 2: Khajinyachi Chittarkatha
- 2014 Timepass (Writer)
- 2015 Timepass 2
- 2017 Halal
- 2017 Cycle
- 2017 Hampi
- 2017 Dhingana
- 2018 Bandh Nylon Che
- 2018 Majhya Baykocha Priyakar
- 2018 Mi Pan Sachin
- 2018 Ye Re Ye Re Paisa 2
- 2018 Maska
- 2019 Hirkani
- 2020 Choricha Mamla
- 2020 Dhurala
- 2024 Shaktiman
- 2024 Danka Hari Namacha
- 2025 Jantar Mantar ChhuMantar
- 2025 All Is Well
- 2025 Khalid Ke Shivaji
- 2026 Bhootam Bhayyam

== Television ==
He is well known for his skits in Fu Bai Fu, a Marathi standup comedy TV show on Zee Marathi and was also the winner of Fu Bai Fu: Naya Hai Yeh along with Vishakha Subhedar. He was also a part of Shejari Shejari Pakke Shejari on Zee Marathi. He made a special appearance in 51st episode of Dil Dosti Duniyadari as 'Dagadu' from Timepass 2. He also played the role of 'Rajabhau' (as young Dilip Prabhavalkar) in the Marathi television show Chukbhul Dyavi Ghyavi. He also hosted the 2017 Marathi Zee Cine Awards alongside Sumeet Raghavan and also won the Best Supporting Actor Award for Halal in the same.

Year	Serial	Role	Notes
2000	Aabhalmaya		
2012	Shejari Shejari Pakke Shejari	Bhujang	
2014	Fu Bai Fu: Naya Hai Yeh	Himself	Winner of Fu Bai Fu: Naya Hai Yeh along with Vishakha Subhedar
2015	Dil Dosti Duniyadari	Dagadu	Special Appearance
2017	Chukbhul Dyavi Ghyavi	Young Rajabhau	
2018	Bigg Boss Marathi 1	Himself	Special appearance
2020	Maharashtrachi Hasyajatra	Himself	Contestant

== Awards ==
- Zee Chitra Gaurav 2017 – Best Supporting Actor Halal
