= Classic Legends =

Indian television series

- Title card of Season 5
- Genre: Non-fiction
- Presented by: Javed Akhtar
- Country of origin: India
- Original language: Hindi
- No. of seasons: 5
- No. of episodes: 65

Production
- Producer: Essel Vision Productions
- Running time: 40 mins (approx.; seasons 1, 3 & 4); 50 mins (approx.; seasons 2 & 5]

Original release
- Release: 11 December 2011 – 2 March 2019

Classic Legends is an Indian television Hindi entertainment show based on the notable and talented people of the Hindi film industry. The first four seasons of the show were aired on Zee Classic. The fifth season airs on Zee Anmol Cinema, Zee Bollywood and Zee Cinema HD. The show is presented by popular Bollywood lyricist, Javed Akhtar. In the show, Javed Akhtar explores the lives of great artists from the golden era of Bollywood who graced the silverscreen with their powerful performances. The first season of show premièred on 11 December 2011 followed by four other seasons.

Each episode takes on one artist while the series covers people who were popular actors, actresses, music composers, directors, singers and lyricists.

== Season 1 ==
The series is presented by Javed Akhtar. Every season has a total of 13 episodes, each exploring the life of a famous personality from the Hindi film Industry. The first season was aired from 11 December 2011 to 4 March 2012. The season featured stories of a variety of people from the film industry ranging from Raj Kapoor to Guru Dutt, Nargis to Kishore Kumar and lyricists like Sahir Ludhianvi to name a few.

Episode		Date	Portrait	Personality
Overall	Season	Date	Portrait	Personality
1	1	11 December 2011		Raj Kapoor
2	2	18 December 2011		R.D. Burman
3	3	25 December 2011		Majrooh Sultanpuri
4	4	1 January 2012		Kishore Kumar
5	5	8 January 2012		Nargis
6	6	15 January 2012		Bimal Roy
7	7	22 January 2012		Vijay Anand
8	8	29 January 2012		Ashok Kumar
9	9	5 February 2012		Sahir Ludhianvi
10	10	12 February 2012		Mehboob Khan
11	11	19 February 2012		Madhubala
12	12	26 February 2012		Guru Dutt
13	13	4 March 2012		Shammi Kapoor

== Season 2 ==
After an overwhelming response to the first season, the second season was aired barely eight months after the first season ended. The season was aired from 18 Nov 2012 – 10 Feb 2013. In this season, Dilip Kumar's biography was extended to the next episode.So, instead of 13, biography of 12 personalities was shared. The season featured the anecdotes from the life of actors like Dilip Kumar and Dev Anand, singer Mohammad Rafi and lyricist Shailendra. Meena Kumari was the only actress whose story featured in this season.

Episode		Date	Portrait	Personality
Overall	Season	Date	Portrait	Personality
14	1	18 November 2012		S.D. Burman
15	2	25 November 2012		Meena Kumari
16	3	2 December 2012		Dev Anand
17	4	9 December 2012		Dilip Kumar
18	5	16 December 2012		Dilip Kumar
19	6	23 December 2012		Mohammad Rafi
20	7	30 December 2012		Anand Bakshi
21	8	6 January 2013		Hrishikesh Mukherjee
22	9	13 January 2013		Chetan Anand
23	10	20 January 2013		Shailendra
24	11	27 January 2013		Sunil Dutt
25	12	3 February 2013		Nasir Hussain
26	13	10 February 2013		Pran

== Season 3 ==
The season three was aired from 2 November 2014 to 25 January 2015. Unlike other seasons, no lyricist was discussed, however, for the first time the life incidents of two singers were shared, instead of one. This season featured stories of stars like Nutan and Sanjeev Kumar, directors like Yash Chopra and singer Lata Mangeshkar.

Episode		Date	Portrait	Personality
Overall	Season	Date	Portrait	Personality
27	1	2 November 2014		Yash Chopra
28	2	9 November 2014		Sanjeev Kumar
29	3	16 November 2014		Shankar Jaikishan
30	4	23 November 2014		Mehmood Ali
31	5	30 November 2014		Mukesh
32	6	7 December 2014		Dharmendra
33	7	14 December 2014		Lata Mangeshkar
34	8	21 December 2014		Manoj Kumar
35	9	28 December 2014		Madan Mohan
36	10	4 January 2015		Nutan
37	11	11 January 2015		Manmohan Desai
38	12	18 January 2015		O.P. Nayyar
39	13	25 January 2015		Waheeda Rehman

== Season 4 ==
After a gap of more than two years, the fourth season was aired from 24 Sep 2017 – 17 Dec 2017. The season featured stories of artists like Rajendra Kumar, Vyjayanthimala, singer Asha Bhosle and composers Laxmikant Pyarelal. The final episode of this season was touted as a tribute to veteran actor Shashi Kapoor, who died thirteen days before the episode aired.

Episode		Date	Portrait	Personality
Overall	Season	Date	Portrait	Personality
40	1	24 September 2017		Balraj Sahni
41	2	1 October 2017		Asha Parekh
42	3	8 October 2017		Rajendra Kumar
43	4	15 October 2017		Asha Bhosle
44	5	22 October 2017		Laxmikant Pyarelal
45	6	29 October 2017		Kalyanji Anandji
46	7	5 November 2017		Vyjayanthimala
47	8	12 November 2017		Hemant Kumar
48	9	19 November 2017		Ravi
49	10	26 November 2017		Sadhana Shivdasani
50	11	3 December 2017		Shakeel Badayuni
51	12	10 December 2017		Rajendra Krishan
52	13	17 December 2017		Shashi Kapoor

== Season 5 ==
By popular demand, Season 5 ran from 8 December 2018. Final episode of this season was aired on 2 March 2019. It aired on 3 channels – Zee Anmol Cinema, Zee Bollywood and Zee Cinema HD. Two biographies featured in a single episode for the first time.

Episode		Date	Portrait	Personality
Overall	Season	Date	Portrait	Personality
53	1	8 December 2018		Rishi Kapoor
53	1	8 December 2018		Sridevi
54	2	15 December 2018		Mumtaz
54	2	15 December 2018		S.H. Bihari
55	3	22 December 2018		Ajit
55	3	22 December 2018		Khayyam
56	4	29 December 2018		Om Prakash
56	4	29 December 2018		Manna Dey
57	5	5 January 2019		Nirupa Roy
57	5	5 January 2019		Wajahat Mirza
58	6	12 January 2019		Amrish Puri
58	6	12 January 2019		Anu Malik
59	7	19 January 2019		Leela Mishra
59	7	19 January 2019		Basu Chatterjee
60	8	26 January 2019		C. Ramchandra
60	8	26 January 2019		Raja Mehdi Ali Khan
61	9	2 February 2019		Hasrat Jaipuri
61	9	2 February 2019		Talat Mahmood
62	10	9 February 2019		Mukhram Sharma
62	10	9 February 2019		Nadira
63	11	16 February 2019		Amiya Chakravarty
63	11	16 February 2019		Hema Malini
64	12	23 February 2019		Mala Sinha
64	12	23 February 2019		Ravindra Jain
65	13	2 March 2019		Jaya Bachchan
65	13	2 March 2019		Prakash Mehra

== See also ==
- Bollywood
- Cinema of India
- Jaane Pehchaane with Javed Akhtar
