= Andhra Pori =

2015 Indian Telugu-language film

- Release poster
- Directed by: Raj Madiraju
- Produced by: Ramesh Prasad
- Starring: Akash Puri; Ulka Gupta
- Cinematography: Praveen Vanamali
- Music by: Dr Josyabhatla
- Release date: 5 June 2015
- Country: India
- Language: Telugu

Andhra Pori (transl. Andhra girl) is a 2015 Indian Telugu-language romantic drama film directed by Raj Madiraju and starring Akash Puri and Ulka Gupta.

The film is a remake of 2014 Marathi film Timepass which was based on author Shaiju Mathew's novel Knocked Up that released in 2010.

== Plot ==
Narsingh is a boy from Telangana who gets kicked out after failing his schooling. He meets Prashanthi, the daughter of a rich man, and falls in love. He calls Prashanthi "Andhra Pori", which means girl from Andhra, and the film covers their relationship and family drama. It is a love story of a little chap.

== Cast ==
- Akash Puri as Narsingh
- Ulka Gupta as Prashanti
- Arvind Krishna
- Sreemukhi as Swapna
- Poornima
- Uttej
- Eshwari Rao

== Soundtrack ==
No.	Title	Singer(s)	Length
1.	"Detthadi"	Swekar Agasthi
2.	"Ye Kalviki"	Pranavi, Vedala Hemachandra
3.	"Andhra Pori"	Amruhta Varshini, Sai Kiran
4.	"Dosthi"	Balaji
5.	"Gundello"	Kalpana
6.	"Ye Charitha"	Hemachandra

== Reception ==
A critic from The Hindu wrote that "All in all, Andhra Pori doesn’t satisfy anyone, the treatment is average and superficial. Surprising that Raj Madiraju who dealt with a far more complicated script like Rushi loses out while striking a balance between high emotion and romance". A critic from 123telugu wrote that "On the whole, Andhra Pori marks a decent debut for Akash Puri. This young actor has a bright future and would be good if he takes a break and comes back well trained in all department".

== Controversy ==
The Andhra Association of Telangana petitioned the court against the film's title, arguing that the word pori is an "objectionable word to degrade the self-respect of the girl". The court dismissed the plea.
