= Singing Star =

Marathi singing reality show

- Genre: Reality television
- Presented by: Hruta Durgule
- Judges: Bela Shende; Prashant Damle; Saleel Kulkarni
- Country of origin: India
- Original language: Marathi
- No. of episodes: 29

Production
- Camera setup: Multi-camera
- Running time: 45 minutes

Original release
- Network: Sony Marathi
- Release: 21 August – 22 November 2020

Singing Star is the Indian Marathi language singing reality show. It has aired on Sony Marathi since 21 August 2020 and ended on 22 November 2020.

== Concept ==
It was a celebrity singing reality show where celebrity was the participants and they were paired along with singer to offer some variety of songs.

== Series overview ==
Season	Year	Channel	Host	Judges	Contestants	Winner	Runner-ups	
Season	Year	Channel	Host	Judges	Contestants	Winner	1st	2nd
1	2020	Sony Marathi	Hruta Durgule	Bela Shende; Prashant Damle; Saleel Kulkarni	12	Swanandi Tikekar	Aastad Kale	Girija Oak

== Contestants and singers ==
- Sankarshan Karhade and Ketaki Bhave-Joshi
- Swanandi Tikekar and Rohit Raut
- Yashoman Apte and Sharayu Date
- Archana Nipankar and Rahul Saxena
- Aarti Wadabgalkar and Tyagraj Khadilkar
- Aastad Kale and Savani Ravindra
- Jui Gadkari and Harshavardhan Wavre
- Ajay Purkar and Amruta Natu
- Abhijit Kelkar and Kavita Raam
- Purniemaa Dey and Mandar Apte
- Anshuman Vichare and Juilee Joglekar
- Girija Oak and Hrishikesh Kamerkar
