= Indian Idol Marathi =

Marathi version of the Pop Idol format

- Genre: Reality television
- Created by: Simon Fuller
- Based on: Pop Idol
- Presented by: Swanandi Tikekar; Prajakta Mali
- Judges: Ajay–Atul
- Country of origin: India
- Original language: Marathi
- No. of episodes: 62

Production
- Camera setup: Multi-camera
- Running time: 45 minutes
- Production company: Fremantle Media India

Original release
- Network: Sony Marathi
- Release: 22 November 2021 – 20 April 2022

Indian Idol Marathi is the Indian Marathi language version of the Pop Idol format and is part of Indian Idol. It has aired on Sony Marathi since 22 November 2021. Ajay–Atul are the judges of the show and Swanandi Tikekar and Prajakta Mali is hosting the show.

== Summary ==
Season	Year	Channel	Host	Judges	Contestants	Winner	Runner-up
1	2021-22	Sony Marathi	Swanandi Tikekar Prajakta Mali	Ajay–Atul	15	Sagar Mhatre	Jagdish Chavan

== Season 1 ==
- Judges

Ajay-Atul

- Host

Swanandi Tikekar

Prajakta Mali

=== Top 15 Contestants ===
Name	Hometown	Result	Place
Sagar Mhatre	Panvel	Winner	1st
Jagdish Chavan	Nashik	1st Runner-up	2nd
Shweta Dandekar	Mumbai	2nd Runner-up	3rd
Pratik Solse	Nashik	4th Runner-up	4th
Bhagyashree Tikle	Nagpur	5th Runner-Up	5th
Chaitanya Devde	Pune	Eliminated	6th
Devashri Manohar	Mumbai	Eliminated	7th
Amrapali Pagare	Nashik	Eliminated	8th
Kaivalya Kejkar	Nagpur	Eliminated	9th
Rushikesh Shelar	Nashik	Eliminated	10th
Ashwini Mithe	Pune	Eliminated	11th
Amol Sakat	Pune	Eliminated	12th
Surabhi Kulkarni	Ahmednagar	Eliminated	13th
Shubham Khandalkar	Pune	Eliminated	14t
Avinash Jadhav	Satara	Eliminated	15th

== Guests ==
Date	Guest	Featured	Ref.
22 November	Bela Shende	For Audition round	
13-14 December	Anuradha Paudwal	Special guest	
20-21 December	Sadhana Sargam	Special guest	
27 December	Uttara Kelkar	Special guest	
28-29 December	Arati Ankalikar-Tikekar	For Manacha Muzra	
3-4 January	Sudesh Bhosale	Special guest	
10-11 January	Amar Haldipur	Special guest	
17-18 January	Nandesh Umap	Folk special	
31 January-1 February	Anand Bhate	Special guest	
31 January-1 February	Jayateerth Mevundi	Special guest	
8-9 February	Bela Shende	Special guest	
15 February	Kishor Kadam	Pay tribute to Lata Mangeshkar	
15 February	Guru Thakur	Pay tribute to Lata Mangeshkar	
22 February	Vijay Dayal	To support their favourite contestant	
22 February	Avadhoot Wadkar	To support their favourite contestant	
22 February	Pramod Chandorkar	To support their favourite contestant	
22 February	Avinash Oak	Special guest	
22 February	Uday Chitre	Special guest	
28 February-1 March	Nagraj Manjule	To promote film Jhund	
28 February-1 March	Rinku Rajguru	To promote film Jhund	
28 February-1 March	Akash Thosar	To promote film Jhund	
2 March	Sid Sriram	To sing song "Srivalli"	
7 March	Anand Shinde	Anand Shinde Special	
8 March	Anupam Kher	To promote film The Kashmir Files	
8 March	Pallavi Joshi	To promote film The Kashmir Files	
14-15 March	Nivedita Joshi-Saraf	To celebrate 90's song	
14-15 March	Priya Arun	To celebrate 90's song	
22 March	Udit Narayan	Special guest	
28-29 March	Devaki Pandit	Special guest	
4-5 April	Ashok Saraf	Special guest	
11-12 April	Pyarelal	Special guest	
19-20 April	Amruta Khanvilkar	To promote film Chandramukhi	
