= Ek Daav Bhatacha =

Marathi-language play directed by Sachin Goswami

- Original language: Marathi
- Written by: Sachin Mote

Premiere
- Directed by: Sachin Goswami

Ek Daav Bhatacha is a Marathi play directed by Sachin Goswami. The cast includes Vrushali Gandhi, Bhushan Kadu, Shraddha Ketkar, Vaibhav Mangle and Vishakha Subhedar.

== Synopsis ==
The daughter of a bank clerk and his wife who is a devotee of Anna Maharaj is married to an auto rickshaw driver.

The driver is always irritated with one lady who usually starts her day by selling vada's near his house. His love for meat and his request to the lady selling vada to bring by hot, spicy chicken will create misunderstandings.

== Cast ==
- Vrushali Gandhi
- Bhushan Kadu
- Shraddha Ketkar
- Vaibhav Mangle
- Vishakha Subhedar
