= Suvarna Mategaonkar =

Indian singer

- Born: Nagpur, Maharashtra, India
- Occupation: Singer
- Years active: 2000–present

Suvarna Mategaonkar (Marathi: सुवर्णा माटेगावकर) is an Indian singer.

== Career ==
Mategaokar has performed in many stage programs of Marathi and Hindi film songs. She performs the program named Rang maza vegla with her daughter. She has made performances along with Hrishikesh Ranade, Jitendra Abhyankar, Ketaki Mategaonkar, Vibhavari Apte Joshi, Prashant Naseri etc.

== Popular songs ==
- Yeil Yeil Sajan Majha
- Dur Ja Tu Dur Ja
- Tula Jar Dyayache Ahe
- Majhech Geet Mi Mhante
- Gade Sambhal Phulnyacha Rutu Aala
- Yei Jeevlaga
- Sapnat Aala Tumhi
- Maj Chahul Dete Kahi
- Siddhi Buddhi
- Tula Mi Pahile
- Jo Tum Todi Piya
- Tichya Til Gali

== Music albums ==
- Majhech Geet Mi Mhante
- Sanjar Gudhe Talashi
- Aabhalachi Vari

== Awards ==
- Ram Kadam Award (2011)

== Personal life ==
She is married to Parag Mategaonkar. Their daughter Ketaki Mategaonkar is also a singer and actor.
