= Luckdown Be Positive =

- Poster
- Directed by: Santosh Manjrekar
- Screenplay by: Ravindra Mathadhikari; Santosh Manjrekar
- Story by: Ravindra Mathadhikari
- Produced by: Sharaddada Bhimaji Sonwane; Sagar Alka Shivaji Phulpagar; Darshan Alka Shivaji Phulpagar; Ajit Sonpatki
- Starring: Ankush Chaudhari; Prajakta Mali
- Cinematography: Dhananjay Kulkarni
- Edited by: Paresh Manjrekar
- Music by: Avinash Vishwajit
- Production company: Ishnav Media House
- Distributed by: Rahul Haksar
- Release date: 25 February 2022
- Country: India
- Language: Marathi

Luckdown Be Positive is a 2022 Indian Marathi-language Family drama Comedy drama film directed by Santosh Ramdas Manjrekar and produced by Ishnav Media House. Theefilm asedtheat ically ron 25 February 2022.

== Plot ==
During a country-wide lockdown, an over-enthusiastic couple tries to spend some time together but fail many times. Due to the lockdown all the guests and a thief which both of them don't know and are considering him a family member of one another are staying under one roof. To add to this the groom thinks that is he doesn't break his seal before his birthday he will have to stay virgin forever and hence tries hard to spend some time alone with his newly wedded wife. A lot of chaos happens during these days as the bride too gets to know her now husband is so eager to spend time with her and is disappointed in him as she thought that he was excited for their first night as a new beginning but was sad when she found out the true reason. The families of them both were making chaos too amidst which the couple were able to spend some time together in a friends farmhouse after faking a fight and fooling the police by saying that the grandmother was critical. At the end of the movie it is revealed that the girl is now pregnant with visible confusion on the relatives' faces. when questioned how this happened they reveal their fake fight and how the grandmother helped them.

== Cast ==
- Ankush Chaudhari
- Prajakta Mali
- Priya Arun
- Shubha Khote
- Sameer Khandekar
- Anand Ingale
- Sanjay Khapre
- Sunil Godbole
- Abhilasha Patil
- Sanjay Mone
- Vanita Kharat
- Yogita Chavan
- Millind Safai
- Sneha Raikar
- Onkar Raut
- Ishan Phulpagar
- Mughdha Dhotre
