= Chukbhul Dyavi Ghyavi =

2017 Indian television series

- Genre: Romantic comedy
- Based on: Marathi Drama Chuk Bhul Dyavi Ghyavi
- Written by: Madhugandha Kulkarni
- Directed by: Swapnanil Jaykar
- Starring: See below
- Country of origin: India
- Original language: Marathi
- No. of episodes: 104

Production
- Producer: Manava Naik
- Camera setup: Multi-camera
- Running time: 22 minutes
- Production company: Strawberry pictures

Original release
- Network: Zee Marathi
- Release: 18 January – 29 July 2017

Chuk Bhul Dyavi Ghyavi (transl. Give & take mistakes) is a Marathi Television romantic comedy produced by Manava Naik and directed by Swapnanil Jaykar. It started airing on Zee Marathi from 18 January 2017 and ended on 29 July 2017. The show was aired every Wednesday to Saturday at 9:30 pm. It stars Dilip Prabhavalkar, Sukanya Kulkarni, Nayana Apte, Priyadarshan Jadhav and Sayali Phatak in lead roles.

The serial is based on the Marathi play of the same name, Chuk Bhul Dyavi Ghyavi, which also starred Dilip Prabhavalkar. The story revolves around the discussion between Rajabhau and Malati and whether they are an ideal couple or not and the past memory and present events of the couples.

== Synopsis ==
The story centres around the comedic encounters of an aged couple, Rajabhau and Malati, after fifty years of marriage spanning from the 1960s to current times. The couple is in their 80s, but still love each other. Rajabhau is young at heart, whereas his wife nudges him to accept his age & come to terms with it.

== Plot ==
Rajabhau Joshee and Malati Joshee are a happily married couple for 50 years. Their son, Dilip Joshee, is settled in England. Rajabhau is upset and adamant for this move, since the British ruled India for over 150 years. In his adolescence, Rajabhau wanted to get into the Indian Army, but failed to do so.

Dilip wants his parents to visit him in England and receive the award for the Most-Perfect Couple. Rajabhau tries to cancel this plan by antics with the help of his friend Tenya. So decides to walk down the memory lane with his wife and mother and decide whether they are the perfect match or not. In the process, they reveal each other's small secrets, which bring happy moments to the trio.

Finally, Malati proves that imperfect couple could be perfect match for the happiness of life, and with their son Dilip accompanying them, they convince Rajabhau to take the trip and finally visit England.

== Cast ==
=== Main ===
- Dilip Prabhavalkar
  - as Elder Rajabhau Joshi and Rajabhau's father. He wanted to be a part of Indian Army but fails. He is much patriotic and hates English attires and culture. He also dislikes his son since he works in a UK based MNC.
  - as Dattatray Marutiraya Joshi (Anna). He is the strict father of Rajabhau, Bandi and Nali. He loves his daughters more than his son. He is very strict and obedient and follows principles. He also loves his younger sister Damayanti. He always refers himself as Dama.
- Priyadarshan Jadhav
  - as Young Rajabhau
  - as Damayanti (Damu Aatya) - Damayanti hates Nani because of her loud behaviour. She likes everything slow and at peace. She always tries to show-off her rich in-laws. She wanted to adopt Rajabhau as she didn't have any heir to her ancestral property.
- Sukanya Kulkarni as Elder Malati Rajabhau Joshi. She is very kind and caring. She loves her son Dilip as he was never encouraged by his father. She also shares a mother-daughter bond with Nani even though she sometimes taunt her.
  - Sayali Phatak as Young Malati
- Nayana Apte Joshi as Nani, Rajabhau's mother. She had a very loud behaviour and was not much liked by her husband, her sister-in-law and son due to her loud and out and out behaviour. She shares a special bond with Nali and Bandi as both her daughters want her precious sarees. She shares a love hate relationship with her son. She also shares mother-daughter bond with Malati. She loves Malati more than her own daughters and son.

=== Recurring ===
- Vihang Bhanage as Young Ashok (Tenya), Rajabhau's childhood friend. He helps Rajabhau in all his affairs. He was desperate to get married.
- Manasi Joshi as Uma, Rajabhau and Malati's daughter. She married Sanjay, a person who had all kinds of diseases. She is always seen with Nani where the latter shares her some secrets of her life and the happy-sad memories of her married life.
- Mugdha Karnik as Kunda, Joshi's past neighbour and Malati's best friend post her marriage. She is scared of her mother-in-law due to her cranky and scary nature. She always borrows milk from the Joshi's much to everyone's dismay except Malati. She also spreads news about any families in the chawl as a gossip queen.
- Esha Dey as Bandi, Rajabhau's and Nali's elder sister. She is married to a lawyer who doesn't demand for his salary. Bandi is cleanliness freak and hence is feared by Malati and Nani. She also becomes the diet instructor for Nani and complains about her Mother-in-law to her.
- Sayali Parab as Young Nali, Rajabhau's elder sister. She always returns to her brother's house every 15–20 days and try to instigate against Nani and Malati in comic way. She is also fond of scents (Attar) and she also takes away Nani's sarees. Until Malati announces her pregnancy, Nali gives Rajabhau tips for making children.
- Swati Bowalekar as Mami, Kunda's mother-in-law. She is weird and always asks Kunda to borrow mill from the Joshi's everyday in return of the things Nani borrowed from her. She even had a fight with Nani for the Pata Varvanata.

=== Cameo appearance ===
- Asawari Joshi as Mankarnika (Manu), Malati's Sister. She is very beautiful. Rajabhau earlier thought her to be Malati. She is married thrice. She confesses to Malati that she would reject Rajabhau if he approached her.
- Aarti Solanki as Elder Sulochana Survase (SuSu). She had a crush on Rajabhau and considered Ashok (Tenya) as her brother while being opposite in reality. She was open minded and had simply and ease in explaining her forward minded thoughts in her teenage days.
  - Mangal Rane as Young Sulochana Survase (SuSu)

== Production ==
=== Development ===
The concept of the show is loosely based on Dilip Prabhavalkar's theatre show with the same name. The theatre show was a big success during its run and hence was adapted into a Marathi Television Series. The characters of Nali, Bandi, Uma, Kusum, Nani and few others were added to the story for the series. In the theatre show Dilip Prabhavalkar played the role of Elder Rajabhau Joshi and reprised the role in this series.

=== Casting ===
Dilip Prabhavalkar reprised the role as Elder Rajabhau and he also portrayed the role of his father Damodar Joshi (DaMa), while Priyadarshan Jadhav was cast to play Young Rajabhau. Sukanya Kulkarni was cast opposite Dilip Prabhavalkar where as Sayali Phatak was cast opposite Priyadarshan Jadhav as Malati.

=== Ratings ===
Week	Year	BARC Viewership		Ref.
Week	Year	TRP	Rank	Ref.
Week 5	2017	2.0	4	
Week 9	2017	2.5	5	
Week 11	2017	3.4	4	
Week 12	2017	2.6	5	
Week 14	2017	2.3	4	
Week 15	2017	2.3	4	
Week 23	2017	1.5	5	
