= Shejari Shejari Pakke Shejari =

Marathi-language comedy TV series

- Genre: Comedy
- Directed by: Vinod Lavekar
- Starring: See below
- Country of origin: India
- Original language: Marathi
- No. of episodes: 168

Production
- Camera setup: Multi-camera
- Running time: 45 minutes
- Production company: Indian Magic Eye Pvt. Ltd.

Original release
- Network: Zee Marathi
- Release: 27 February 2013 – 24 May 2014

Shejari Shejari Pakke Shejari is an Indian Marathi-language television series which aired on Zee Marathi. It starred Vaibhav Mangle and Anand Ingale in lead roles.

== Cast ==
=== Main ===
- Anand Ingale as Ballal Lambodar Pathak
- Vaibhav Mangle as Brijlal Pathak (Birju)

=== Recurring ===
Ballal's family

- Sulekha Talwalkar as Yamini Ballal Pathak
- Mandar Kulkarni as Moraya Ballal Pathak
- Vidyadhar Joshi as Ashwin

Birju's family

- Vishakha Subhedar as Lajwanti Brijlal Pathak (Lajjo)
- Shivani Rangole as Mahua Brijlal Pathak
- Priyadarshan Jadhav as Bhujang
- Manasi Kulkarni as Harini

Others

- Kishor Pradhan as Bapu Damle
- Vijay Kadam as Mr. Ashtaputre
- Rupali Bhosale as Monika Ghadge
- Bharat Ganeshpure as Popatrao Landge
- Shashikant Kerkar as Baluchi
- Prabhakar More as Suhas Parab

== Awards ==
Zee Marathi Utsav Natyancha Awards 2013
Category	Recipient	Role
Best Comedy Male	Anand Ingale	Ballal Pathak
Best Comedy Male	Vaibhav Mangle	Birju Pathak
