= Phulpakharu (TV series) =

Indian television series

- Genre: Romance
- Directed by: Mandar Devsthali Subodh Bare
- Starring: See below
- Theme music composer: Vishal-Jagdish
- Opening theme: Phulpakharu by Kirti Killedar and Anurag Godbole
- Country of origin: India
- Original language: Marathi
- No. of episodes: 774

Production
- Producer: Mandar Devsthali
- Camera setup: Multi-camera
- Running time: 22 minutes

Original release
- Network: Zee Yuva
- Release: 24 April 2017 – 26 October 2019

Phulpakharu (transl. Butterfly) is an Indian Marathi language television series which aired on Zee Yuva. The series premiered from 24 April 2017 and ended on 26 October 2019, but was renewed during the COVID-19 pandemic.

== Plot ==
Manas and Vaidehi are in their college days. Manas is in love with Vaidehi, and he sends her poems. Vaidehi soon falls in love with these poems, and through a common friend, she meets her secret admirer. Due to an inter college drama competition, Vaidehi and Manas grow close, and Vaidehi falls in love with Manas. They begin dating soon after. Vaidehi’s best friend, Sameer Nawathe is in love with her, but she clears their misunderstandings and remains friends with him. Sameer’s father, a businessman sets a trap for Manas and Vaidehi’s families, but the truth comes out later, and at a New Year’s party, the families reconcile.

This marks the entry of Maya, who falls in love with Manas. She sweet talks Vaidehi, and becomes her friend. She troubles Manas, by visiting his home often, by trapping her and Manas in a classroom in college and paying a guy to click intimate pictures of them, blackmailing Manas indirectly. Maya tells Vaidehi one sided stories about Manas cheating on Vaidehi. Angry and hurt, Vaidehi breaks up with Manas. Sameer finds out about Maya’s plan and makes his own plan to fool her. Manas and Vaidehi reconcile. They reveal their relationship to their respective homes, getting acceptance in both homes.

Soon, Rocky, a completely egoistic musician, Maya’s friend, enters their lives, and insults their gang. Vaidehi challenges Rocky for a competition. Maya, meanwhile sweet talks Vaidehi’s friend, Tanya, and she helps Maya by influencing Varsha, Vaidehi’s best friend, against Vaidehi. Tanya also creates problems for the group, by stealing and hiding their equipment. On Holi, Maya mixes bhaang in the thandai, leading to Manas and Vaidehi having an intercourse. Their gang wins the competition and Vaidehi is revealed pregnant, after their college ends. Meanwhile, Sameer and Tanya fall in love with each other and start dating.

After they tell their families, Manas’s father tells him to earn a certain amount of money in order to come back home. Soon after, Manas starts working at a travel company. Manas and Vaidehi get married. Manas’ boss’ wife, Shalmali is a woman with no child of her own. She starts becoming protective about pregnant Vaidehi and starts disliking Manas. She creates many troubles in Manas and Vaidehi's lives, by influencing Vaidehi against Manas and kidnapping Vaidehi. She is revealed with a psychological problem, and later Manas and Vaidehi forgive her.

Meanwhile, Manas’ uncle, Kuldeep, has an eye on the property owned by Sadanand Rege. He pushes the family into troubles, causing Manas’ accident, where he goes into coma for a long time. Finally, Kuldeep is arrested. Soon after, a baby girl is born to Manas and Vaidehi, and they name her Mahi. They think of donating their child to childless Shalmali, but Shalmali refuses. They soon shift to a new house, gifted to them by Vaidehi’s father. Manas and Vaidehi join her father’s company.

Manas later starts working for RBK (Revati Bhargav Kotibhaskar), as a musician and singer, a job of his dreams. Sameer too, joins the same company, a few days later. Revati, Manas and Sameer’s boss, hates Manas and Sameer’s friendship, and plans to sabotage it. She accuses Manas of molestation. Vaidehi, aspiring to be a lawyer that time, takes up Manas’s case. Sameer supports Revati. This brings a lot of problems in Sameer and Tanya’s relationship. They break up soon after.

Vaidehi proves Manas not guilty, and Sameer and Manas reconcile. Revati is revealed to be jealous of Manas, who has everything. Sameer apologises to Tanya, and they get back together. Kuldeep (Manas’s uncle) asks for divorce from Kusum, Manas’s aunt. Kusum soon falls in love with Subu, Tanya’s relative, and they decide to marry each other. The show ends on Mahi’s first birthday, on a positive note.

== Cast ==
=== Main ===
- Hruta Durgule as Vaidehi Inamdar-Rege: A young, confident, outgoing college girl, Manas' wife, daughter of Raosaheb Inamdar, sister of Vikrant and Mahi's mother
- Yashoman Apte as Manas Rege: A simple, shy college boy, Vaidehi's husband, son of Sadanand and Pratibha Rege and Mahi's father.

=== Recurring ===
- Manoj Kolhatkar as Sadanand Rege: A strict, moral, loving man who is Pratibha's husband, Manas' father, Vaidehi's father-in-law.
- Pratiba Bhagat as Manas' mother, Pratibha Rege: A simple, sweet woman, Sadanand's wife, Vaidehi's mother-in-law.
- Nilay Ghaisas as Vikrant (Vicky): A fun, loyal character often teased for his long hair, Raosaheb Inamdar's son, Vaidehi's younger brother.
- Deepak Karanjikar as Raosaheb Inamdar: Vaidehi's and Vikram's single father.
- Ashish Joshi as Sameer Nawathe: A boy from a very rich family, but hungry for love. Vaidehi's best friend, Tanya's love interest. He loved Vaidehi at first, but sacrificed after know about ManDehi and moved on. But, he keeps flirting with her often.
- Trushna Chandratre as Tanya: Sameer's girlfriend. She always loved sameer. She teamed up with Maya due to her manipulation, but later apologized and returned to dosti gang.
- Priyanka Tendolkar as Varsha: Amit's love interest, best friend of Vaidehi. She too teamed up with Maya due to her manipulation, but she too apologized and returned.
- Advait Kadne as Amit: Manas' best friend, Varsha's love interest. Initially, he helped Manas in delivering poems to Vaidehi.
- Chetan Vadnere as Chetan: Single, always ready-to-mingle.
- Gaurav Malvankar as Gaurav: Single, always ready-to-mingle.
- Nupur Chitale as Radha: The daughter of Sadanand's friend, Manas' friend.
- Senjali Thakur as a college teacher.
- Rupal Nand as Revati
- Rujuta Dharap as Maya: A girl obsessed with Manas. She manipulated Tanya and Varsha and made them betray Dosti gang in order to win the music competition, but Dosti gang won eventually.
- Hemangi Kavi as Shalmali: The wife of Manas' boss, Vaidehi's friend. She creates many problems due to her psychological problem.
- Abhijeet Kelkar as Sheetal: Manas' boss, Shalmali's husband.
- Prasad Oak as Anil: Manas' neighbour and Raosaheb's employee.
- Poorva Gokhale as Archana: Manas' neighbour, Anil's wife. She is childless, so she conducts baby-sitting in her home.
- Pournima Talwalkar as Kusum Aatya: Manas' aunt, Kuldeep's wife. She disliked Vaidhehi at first, but later Vaidehi won her heart.
- Mandar Devsthali as Subu: Tanya's uncle, Kusum's love interest.
- Onkar Raut as Rocky: student of Mansi's college.

== Soundtrack ==
Phulpakharu

Soundtrack album by Vishal-Jagdish
- Released: 2017
- Recorded: 2017–2019
- Genre: Marathi film soundtrack
- Label: Zee Yuva
- Producer: Vishal-Jagdish

The series' music was composed by Vishal-Jagdish, with lyrics by Vishal Rane and Ashwini Shende.

Track List
No.	Title	Lyrics	Singer(s)	Length
1.	"Phulpakharu Title song"	Vishal Rane	Kirti Killedar, Anurag Godbole	1:30
2.	"Tujhe Prem Majla Kalu Lagle"	Vishal-Jagdish	Siddharth Bhavsar	3:46
3.	"Algad Haluvar Manamadhe"	Vishal Rane		3:04
4.	"Odh Tuzi"	Vishal-Jagdish	Kirti Killedar, Yashoman Apte	2:54
5.	"Mi Tujha Mi Tujhi"	Vishal-Jagdish	Aboli Girhe, Chinmay Hulyalkar	3:32
6.	"Don't Know If This Is Love"	Vishal-Jagdish		3:15
7.	"Yaariyan"	Vishal Rane, Mandar Devsthali	Yashoman Apte, Ashish Joshi	3:39
8.	"Houni Phulpakharu"	Ashwini Shende	Bela Shende, Savani Ravindra, Mangesh Borgaonkar, Kirti Killedar, Aboli Girhe, Yashoman Apte, Ashish Joshi	3:13
9.	"Aaj Mein Behka Hoon"	Vishal-Jagdish	Kirti Killedar, Yashoman Apte	2:21
10.	"Hi Survaat"	Vishal-Jagdish
11.	"Nande Sukhachi Savali"	Vishal Rane		3:51
12.	"Sakhi Mhanu Priya Mhanu"	Vishal Rane	Vishal Rane	3:12
