= Onkar Raut =

Indian actor (born 1990)

- Born: Onkar Manomilan Raut; 9 August 1990 (age 36); Mumbai, Maharashtra, India
- Education: D. G. Ruparel College (B.com)
- Occupations: Actor; comedian
- Known for: Maharashtrachi Hasyajatra
- Relatives: Raja Mayekar (grandfather)

Onkar Raut (born 9 August 1990) is an Indian actor known for his work in Marathi language comedy Television Show Maharashtrachi Hasyajatra. He is featured in the Marathi films such as Timepass, Luckdown Be Positive, Timepass 3. Raut also acted in ZEE5 series Kaale Dhande, starring Mahesh Manjrekar, Sanskruti Balgude and Shubhankar Tawde in the lead roles. Along with Prarthana Behere, he will be seen in the lead role in Prasad Oak's film Sutka.

== Early life and education ==
Onkar Raut was born and brought up in Mumbai, Maharashtra. He is originally from Malvan. He completed his B.com degree from D. G. Ruparel College in Mumbai.

== Career ==
Onkar Raut started his career with drama. He made his debut on the silver screen with the 2014 film Timepass. He has also acted in television series. The role played in the serial Freshers was appreciating. He played a pivotal role in the ZEE5 web series Kale Dhande released in 2019. In 2022, he reprised his role in Timepass 3 from previous film. Also featured in Luckdown Be Positive, alongside Ankush Chaudhari and Prajakta Mali. Now he is working on Sutka film which will be directed by Prasad Oak.

== Filmography ==
=== Films ===
Key
†	Denotes films that have not yet been released

Year	Film	Role	Note	Refs
2014	Timepass	Kombadya	Marathi	
2022	Luckdown Be Positive	Sanju	Hindi	
2022	Timepass 3	Kombadya	Marathi	
2025	Inspector Zende	Patekar	Hindi	
TBA	Sutka †	TBA	Marathi	
2026	Sunday 1996	lead role	Marathi	

=== Web series ===
Year	Title	Role	Notes	Refs
2019	Kaale Dhande	Sam	ZEE5 original series	

=== Television ===
Year	Title	Role	Refs
2016–2017	Freshers	Dhaval Mithbavkar	
2017–2019	Phulpakhru	Rocky	
2022–present	Maharashtrachi Hasyajatra	Contestant	
