= Anshuman Joshi =

Indian actor

- Born: 26 March 1996 (age 30); Kolhapur
- Occupation: Actor
- Years active: 2009–present

Anshuman Joshi is an Indian actor who works in Marathi language films. He began his career with the movie Shala in 2011. He later acted in the Malayalam movie Thankam in 2023. The name of his character was also Anshuman Joshi. He played the role of a Marathi Police officer in the movie.

== Biography ==
He began with his stint in the Marathi film industry. He was born in Kolhapur & currently lives in the city of Pune, India.

== Career ==
Joshi began his career as an actor, playing Vishnupant Damle as a teenager in Bolpatanacha Muknayak: Vishnupant Damle directed by Virendra Valsangkar. Currently he is working in 2 plays, Gadi and Aamcha Kay Gunha, under production of Fergusson college Pune-04. In 2023 he played the role of a Marathi Police officer named Anshuman Joshi in the Malayalam movie Thankam .

=== Films ===
- Shala (2011, Marathi)
- Mhais (2012, Marathi)
- Puranpoli (short film)
- Photocopy (2016, Marathi)
- Phuntroo (2016, Marathi)
- Faster Fene (2017, Marathi)
- Karwaan (2018, Hindi)
- Thankam (2023, Malayalam)
- Devmanus (2024, Marathi)

== Awards ==
- Special Mention Jury Award in the 10th Pune International Film Festival 2012–2013 for Joshi's role in Shala.
- Best Child Artist Award in the 3rd Asian Film Festival Kolhapur 2011–2012 for Joshi's role in Shala.
- Special Mention Jury Award by Maharashtra government-State awards 2012.
- Zee Gaurav Puraskar for Best debut performance 2012.
- Shahu Modak Purskar 2012.
- V. Shantaram Purskar as Best Child Artist 2012.
