= Swanandi Tikekar =

Indian television actress (born 1990)

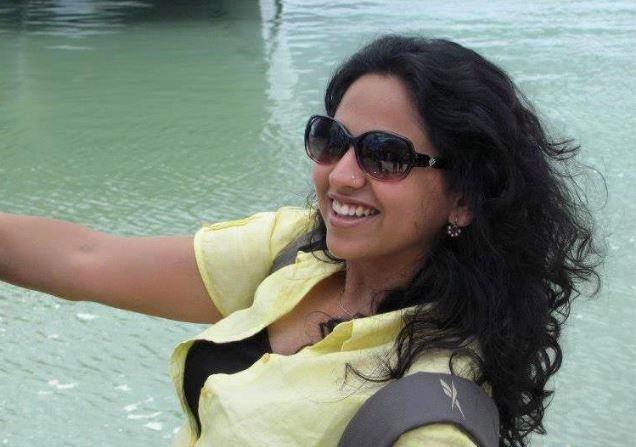
- Swanandi Tikekar
- Born: 13 November 1990 (age 35); Mumbai, Maharashtra, India
- Occupation: Actress
- Years active: 2015–present
- Known for: Dil Dosti Duniyadari; Dil Dosti Dobara
- Spouse: Ashish Kulkarni (m. 2023)
- Parent(s): Uday Tikekar; Arati Ankalikar Tikekar

Swanandi Tikekar (born 13 November 1990) is a Marathi actress. She is daughter of Uday Tikekar and Arati Ankalikar Tikekar. She known for her performance in Zee Marathi's Dil Dosti Duniyadari as Meenal Shewale and Dil Dosti Dobara as Mukta. She married Ashish Kulkarni on 25 December 2023.

== Career ==
She pursued master's degree in law from ILS Law College. She is well known for her role as Meenal Shewale in Dil Dosti Duniyadari, Mukta in Dil Dosti Dobara and Sakhi in Assa Maher Nako Ga Bai. She was also seen in the plays Ek Shoonya Teen and Don't Worry Be Happy. She also played Ankita in Agga Agga Sunbai Kay Mhanta Sasubai

She is the 1st winner of the popular singing contest Singing Star. In 2021, she hosted the Sony Marathi's Indian Idol Marathi.

== Films ==
- Kurla To Vengurla (2025)

== Television ==
Year	Title	Role	Notes	Ref.
2002	Aabhalmaya	Varsha	Child actor	
2015-2016	Dil Dosti Duniyadari	Meenal Shewale	Television debut	
2017	Dil Dosti Dobara	Mukta	Parallel lead	
2020-2021	Assa Maher Nako Ga Bai	Sakshi Upasane-Kudtarkar	Lead role	
2020	Singing Star	Contestant	Winner	
2021-2022	Indian Idol Marathi	Host		
2022	Sundara Manamadhe Bharli	Advocate Prateeksha		
2022–2023	Aga Aga Sunbai Kay Mhanta Sasubai?	Ankita Shantanu Mantri	Lead role	
