= Khelti Hai Zindagi Aankh Micholi =

Indian television drama

- Genre: Drama
- Created by: Essel Vision Productions
- Written by: Anjum Abbas; Rajesh Soni
- Directed by: Amit Singh
- Starring: Ulka Gupta; Helly Shah; Gautami Kapoor; Manav Gohil
- Country of origin: India
- Original language: Hindi
- No. of seasons: 1
- No. of episodes: 83

Production
- Producers: Subhash Chandra; Nitin Keni
- Production locations: Ahmedabad; Mumbai
- Running time: 22 minutes
- Production company: Essel Vision Productions

Original release
- Network: Zee TV
- Release: September 9, 2013 – January 3, 2014

Khelti Hai Zindagi Aankh Micholi (international title: Life of Ami) is an Indian drama television series that premiered on 9 September 2013 on Zee TV. It was produced by Essel Vision Productions and stars Ulka Gupta, Helly Shah, Gautami Kapoor and Manav Gohil.

Khelti Hai Zindagi Aankh Micholi follows the story of 14-year-old girl Ami (Ulka Gupta / Helly Shah) whose father has died. Her mother Shruti (Gautami Kapoor) was forced to take up the dual responsibility of both mother and father. Shruti's family friend Sanjay (Manav Gohil) falls in love with her and expresses to marry her. Shruti first refuses but due to family pressure marries him.

The show began production on 6 September 2013. It was originally scheduled to begin airing on 9 September 2013, but was delayed. In December 2013, Helly Shah replaced Ulka Gupta as Ami.

The show is dubbed in English and aired on Zee World as Life of Ami.

== Cast ==
- Ulka Gupta/Helly Shah as Ami
- Gautami Kapoor as Shruti Sanjay Mehta Ami mother
- Reem Sheikh as Khushboo
- Shivangi Joshi as Trisha
- Vinay Jain as Harsh Joshipura
- Manav Gohil as Sanjay Mehta
- Farida Dadi as Baa
- Shoma Anand as Prabha Mehta
- Vidhi Pandya as Ayesha
- Suhita Thatte as Kumkum
- Manishaa Purohit as Jassuben
- Bharat Kamuvani as Praveen Joshipura
- Eva Ahuja as Nisha Joshipura
- Tarul Swami as Yogesh
- Rishina Kandhari as Riddhi Mehta
- Sachin Verma
- Khyaati Khandke Keswani
- Neha Thakur
