= Sujay Dahake =

Indian film director and editor

- Born: Pune, Maharashtra, India
- Occupations: Film Director, Writer
- Known for: Shala

Sujay Sunil Dahake is mainly known for his work as director and as editor for the film Shala, a film that was awarded the Silver Lotus Award for Best Marathi Feature Film at the 59th National Film Awards.

== Career ==
The film Ajoba is his more ambitious movie than Marathi movie Shala.

Sujay has begun the scripting for his next project titled 'Shyam Chi Aai' which will be shot in black and white. The story is an adaptation of the famous autobiography Shyamchi Aai written by writer and social activist Sane Guruji. The autobiography reflected the strong depiction of a mother's love for her child.

== Filmography ==
Year	Film	Language	Director	Writer	Notes
2012	Shala	Marathi	Yes	No	- National Film Award for Best Feature Film in Marathi at 59th national Awards 2011.; - National Film Award for Best Screenplay at 59th national Awards 2011. • Screenplay Writer (Adapted)
2014	Ajoba	Marathi	Yes	Yes	
2016	Phuntroo	Marathi	Yes	Yes	Science fiction film
2020	Kesari	Marathi	Yes	No	
2023	Shyamchi Aai (2023 film)		Yes		
