= Rajni Ki Baraat =

2026 Hindi-language film

- Directed by: Aditya Aman
- Produced by: Tanaayaa Adarkar Prabhu; Tej H. Adarkar
- Starring: Ulka Gupta; Ashwath Bhatt; Zarina Wahab; Sunita Rajwar; Ishita Singh
- Cinematography: Aarup Mondal
- Edited by: Anuradha Singh
- Music by: Bapi Bhattacharya
- Production company: Epiphany Entertainment
- Release date: 29 May 2026
- Running time: 124 minutes
- Country: India
- Language: Hindi

Rajni Ki Baraat is a 2026 Indian Hindi-language comedy-drama film directed by Aditya Aman and produced by Tanaayaa Adarkar Prabhu and Tej H. Adarkar. The movie is Directed by Aditya Aman. The film stars Ulka Gupta, Ashwath Bhatt, Sunita Rajwar and Zarina Wahab in pivotal roles. The movie was shot in Darbhanga, Bihar.

== Premise ==
The story revolves around Rajni, a strong-willed young woman who decides to take control of her destiny by organizing her own wedding procession after her boyfriend's authoritarian and egoistic policeman father fixes his marriage elsewhere. The film blends comedy, drama, romance and social commentary with a rooted North Indian backdrop.

== Cast ==
- Ulka Gupta as Rajni
- Ashwath Bhatt as Malkhan Singh
- Sunita Rajwar as Maa
- Zarina Wahab as Dadi
- Kanishk Vijay as Rajjan
- Eshita Singh as Radha
- Pushpak Anand as Nishant
- Chiranjivi Karan as Ravi
- Javed Khan as King
- Kirti Adarkar as Sethani

== Production ==
The film is produced by Tanaayaa Adarkar Prabhu and Tej H. Adarkar, while Anshuman Panda and Kirti Adarkar serve as co-producers. The screenplay and dialogues are written by Aditya Aman and Anuupam Purohit, based on a story by Subhash Chandar.

== Release ==
Rajni Ki Baraat is slated for theatrical release on 29 May 2026.

== Reception ==
Prachi Arya of India Today said, "Rajni ki Baraat is not the baraat which would make you excitedly wait to dance in it. It feels like a film with its heart absolutely in the right place, even if its execution occasionally forgets the route to the venue." Ronak Kotecha of The Times of India wrote that the film managed to "distinguish itself from the usual small-town Bollywood dramas with a thought-provoking climax that’s perhaps exactly the kind of social commentary a new India needs." Pratik Shekhar from News18 Hindi said that the film wasn't just a "typical love story between a boy and a girl, but rather the story of daughters from small towns in a changing India who now have the courage to challenge the walls of society's old-fashioned thinking for their rights, their love, and their decisions."
