= Man Udu Udu Jhala =

2021 Indian Marathi language TV series

- Genre: Romance; Drama
- Written by: Swapnil Chavhan, Abhiram Ramdasi
- Directed by: Mandar Devasthali, Harish Shirke
- Starring: See below
- Country of origin: India
- Original language: Marathi
- No. of episodes: 311

Production
- Producer: Sandeep Jadhav
- Production locations: Thane, Maharashtra
- Cinematography: Amit Baig
- Camera setup: Multi-Camera
- Running time: 22 minutes
- Production company: Ekasmai Creations

Original release
- Network: Zee Marathi
- Release: 30 August 2021 – 13 August 2022

Man Udu Udu Jhala (transl. My Mind Wandered) is an Indian Marathi language television series which aired on Zee Marathi. It is directed by Mandar Devsthali and produced by Sandeep Jadhav under the banner of Ekasmai creations. The show stars Hruta Durgule and Ajinkya Raut in the lead roles. Its title track is sung by Avadhoot Gupte and Aarya Ambekar. It premiered from 30 August 2021 by replacing Pahile Na Mi Tula. The show went off air on 13 August 2022 completing 311 episodes.

== Summary ==
Indra, a rowdy man, constantly gets in trouble due to his temper. He keeps crossing paths with Deepika, a reserved young woman, and eventually falls in love with her.

=== Special episode (1 hour) ===
- 31 October 2021
- 21 November 2021
- 9 January 2022
- 13 February 2022
- 17 April 2022
- 5 June 2022
- 19 June 2022
- 24 July 2022

== Plot ==
Deepika (Deepu) Deshpande a reserved young woman get appointed in SP Bank as Loan Recovery Agent on her father's insistence. Her father is a proud teacher with strict rules and believer of old traditions. Indrajeet Salgaonkar is an MBA graduate but unemployed due to low employment gets appointed in SP Bank as Hard Recovery Agent alongside Deepu. Indra is also an ex-student of Manohar.

Indra's method of recovery is not liked by Deepu but works for recovery. Indra is possessive about his mother Jayashri and fakes his employment from her and his family. Sattu, Indra's brother-like friend also accompanies in the same. Indra loves his family and hence never questions them who intern also reciprocate the love.

Deepu's eldest sister Shalaka's marriage gets fixed with an American return fraud Nayan. Nayan's family berates the Dehspande's for their simple lifestyle and demand the wedding to be done in grand way with many more demands. Deshpande's sell their ancestral properties for the arrangement of this wedding. Nayan's family always berates and demeans Deepu on every encounter. Shalaka's younger and Deepu's elder sister Sanika gets romantically involved in Kartik, Indra's younger brother who is a casanova. Deepu warns Sanika about it but instead she refutes the allegations and blames Deepu.

Indra and Deepu work together and constantly have disagreements during the process of recovery but later they cope-up together. Indra gets smitten by Deepu's beauty and falls in love with her. Jayashri too gets impressed by Deepu's behaviour and hence wants to get her married to Indra. Manohar and Malati reveal that they hate the couple who hide their relationship secret or who elope for marriage.

With growing demands from Nayan's family, Manohar tries to break the alliance but fails. When Indra meets him, he senses his financial issues and decides help him by organising his felicitation program. Meanwhile, Malati steals some amount from the loan recovery bag for which Deepu gets blamed from the bank and even risking her job. When Malati learns about risking job, she reveals the truth. During the felicitation program, Deepu learns that Indra is actually her father's best student. Later, before Shalaka's marriage the Bank Manager visits Deepu's home to Tell Deshpande Sir about the theft.

== Cast ==
=== Main ===
- Hruta Durgule as Deepika Indrajeet Salgaonkar / Deepika Manohar Deshpande (Deepu), Manohar and Malati's youngest daughter, Indra's wife
- Ajinkya Raut as Indrajeet Salgaonkar (Indra), Jayshri's eldest son, Deepu's husband

=== Recurring ===
Salgaonkar family

- Purnima Talwalkar as Jayashri Salgaonkar, Indrajeet, Kartik and Mukta's mother
- Ruturaj Phadake as Kartik Salgaonkar, Indrajeet's younger and Mukta's elder brother, Sanika's husband
- Prajakta Parab as Mukta Salgaonkar, Indrajeet and Kartik's younger sister

Deshpande family

- Arun Nalawade as Manohar Deshpande, Malati's husband, Shalaka, Sanika and Deepika's father
- Ruplaxmi Shinde as Malati Manohar Deshpande, Manohar's wife, Shalaka, Sanika and Deepika's mother
- Sharvari Kulkarni as Shalaka Manohar Deshpande / Shalaka Nayan Kanvinde (Didi), Manohar and Malati's eldest daughter, Nayan's wife, Snehlata's daughter-in-law
- Reena Madhukar as Sanika Manohar Deshpande / Sanika Kartik Salgaonkar (Taai), Manohar and Malati's middle daughter, Kartik's wife, Jayashri's daughter-in-law

Kanvinde family

- Amit Parab as Nayan Vishwas Kanvinde, Shalaka's husband
- Sandeep Soman as Vishwas Kanvinde, Nayan's father
- Kasturi Sarang as Snehlata Vishwas Kanvinde, Nayan's mother
- Shweta Mande as Sampada Kanvinde, Nayan's aunt

=== Others ===
- Vinamra Bhabal as Sattu, Indra's best friend
- Raju Bawadekar as M.V. Sontakke, S.P. Bank's Deputy Manager
- Anil Rajput as Amit Kulkarni, Deepu's fiance
- Vidya Sant as Meenakshi Kunthe, S.P. Bank's staff member

== Awards ==
Zee Marathi Utsav Natyancha Awards 2021
Category	Recipient	Role	Ref.
Best Couple	Ajinkya Raut-Hruta Durgule	Indra-Deepu	
Best Father	Arun Nalawade	Manohar	
Most Trending Character Male	Ajinkya Raut	Indra	
Most Trending Character Female	Hruta Durgule	Deepu	
