= Ulka Gupta =

Indian television actress (born 1997)

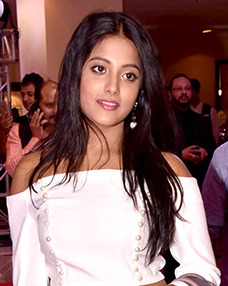
- Gupta in 2017
- Born: Ulka Gupta; 12 April 1997 (age 29); Saharsa, Bihar, India
- Occupation: Actress
- Years active: 2009–present

Ulka Gupta (born 12 April 1997) is an Indian actress who predominantly works in Hindi and Telugu films and television. She is popularly known as Manu, as she played the role of Manu (the young Rani Lakshmibai) in Jhansi Ki Rani until the leap; later she made a re-entry in the same show as Kaali. Her debut film was the Tollywood film Andhra Pori, in which she plays the lead character, Prashanti. Gupta also appeared in the 2015 Telugu film Rudhramadevi.

== Early life ==
Ulka Gupta was born on 12 April 1997 in Saharsa, Bihar. Her family is native to the area. She was brought up in Mumbai. Her father Gagan and her younger sister Goya are also actors. She studied at Rustom Jee International School, Dahisar, Mumbai.

== Career ==
Gupta first faced the camera in Resham Dankh and later appeared in Saat Phere – Saloni Ka Safar as Child Savri Singh. She gained recognition for her performance as Manu in Jhansi Ki Rani. For the role, she underwent training in horse riding and sword fighting and also learned Sanskrit to deliver shlokas.

She also played Child Ami Joshipura in Khelti Hai Zindagi Aankh Micholi. Gupta made her Telugu film debut with Andhra Pori (2015), produced by Akkineni Ramesh Prasad, opposite Akash Puri.

Gupta was approached to play the lead role of Savi Chavan in Ghum Hai Kisikey Pyaar Meiin and participated in a mock shoot for the role; however, she did not join the show, and the role was later played by Bhavika Sharma.

She later portrayed Rajkumari Shyammohini Singh in Dhruv Tara – Samay Sadi Se Pare.

Gupta also faced criticism from sections of the audience for her role in The Kerala Story 2.

== Filmography ==
=== Films ===
Year	Title	Role	Language	Notes
2015	Andhra Pori	Prashanti	Telugu	
2015	Rudhramadevi	Young Rudhrama Devi / Young Rudhra Deva	Telugu	
2016	Traffic	Riya Kapoor	Hindi	
2017	Mr. Kabaadi	Meethi	Hindi	
2017	Shrestha Bangali		Bengali	
2018	Odh – The Attraction		Marathi	
2018	Simmba	Nandini Mohile	Hindi	
2026	The Kerala Story 2	Surekha Nair	Hindi	
2026	Rajni Ki Baraat	Rajni	Hindi	
2026	Agadha	Mahima	Telugu	
2026	Eetha †	TBA	Hindi	Filming
2027	NAVRUP	TBA	Odia	

=== Television ===
Year	Title	Role	Channel	Notes
2009	Saat Phere – Saloni Ka Safar	Child Savri Singh	Zee TV	
2009–2010	Jhansi Ki Rani	Child Manikarnika Tambe/Kaali	Zee TV	
2012	Fear Files: Darr Ki Sacchi Tasvirein	Herself	Zee TV	
2013	Khelti Hai Zindagi Aankh Micholi	Child Ami Joshipura	Zee TV	
2014	Devon Ke Dev...Mahadev	Devi Kanyakumari	Life OK	
2017–2018	Shaktipeeth Ke Bhairav	Devi Parvati	Big Magic	
2022–2023	Banni Chow Home Delivery	Banni Singh Rathod	Star Plus	
2023	Dhruv Tara – Samay Sadi Se Pare	Rajkumari Shyammohini	Sony SAB	
2024	Main Hoon Saath Tere	Janvi Joshi Bundela	Zee TV	

=== Web series ===
Year	Title	Role	Platform	Notes
2022	Modern Love Hyderabad	Sneha (Episode 5 – "About That Rustle In The Bushes")	Amazon Prime Video	Anthology series

== Awards ==
- Indian Telly Awards - Most Popular Child Artist in Jhansi Ki Rani
- Zee Gold Awards - Best Performer of the Year in Jhansi Ki Rani

== See also ==
- List of Indian film actresses
- List of Indian television actresses
