= Taani =

- Promotional release poster
- Directed by: Sanjiv Kolte
- Screenplay by: Sanjeev Kolte
- Story by: Gaytri Kolte
- Produced by: Vandana Patke Thakur; Ajay Thakur
- Starring: Arun Nalawade; Ketaki Mategaonkar
- Music by: Pravin Kunwar
- Production company: V. Patke Films
- Release date: 17 May 2013
- Country: India
- Language: Marathi

Taani is a 2013 Indian Marathi-language drama film directed by Sanjiv Kolte, also provided screenplay and dialogues. It is produced by Vandana Patke Thakur and Ajay Thakur. The film features Arun Nalawade, Ketaki Mategaonkar, Vatsala Ambone and Vilas Ujawane. Music is composed by Pravin Kunwar. It was theatrically released on 17 May 2013.

== Plot ==
Taani is the daughter of a poor cycle rickshaw puller. He works hard day and night to give his daughter a good education so that her future is bright. Taani realizes the sacrifices her family makes for her. Despite objections, Taani starts working as a maid to fulfill her dreams. Taani wants to reduce the burden on her family who are doing everything to give her a decent life.

== Cast ==
- Arun Nalwade as Shankar
- Devendra Dodke as Sukhdev
- Sachin Deshpande as Arun
- Ketaki Mategaonkar as Taani
- Vatsala Ambone as Girija
- Vilas Ujawane as Tamhane Sir

== Release ==
=== Theatrical ===
The film was theatrically released on 17 May 2013.

=== Home media ===
The film is originally available on ZEE5.

== Accolades ==
| Year | Award | Category | Result | Ref(s) |
|---|---|---|---|---|
| 2013 | Maharashtra State Awards | Best Story | Won | |
| 2013 | Maharashtra State Awards | Best Make up | Won | |
