= Ketaki Mategaonkar =

Indian singer songwriter

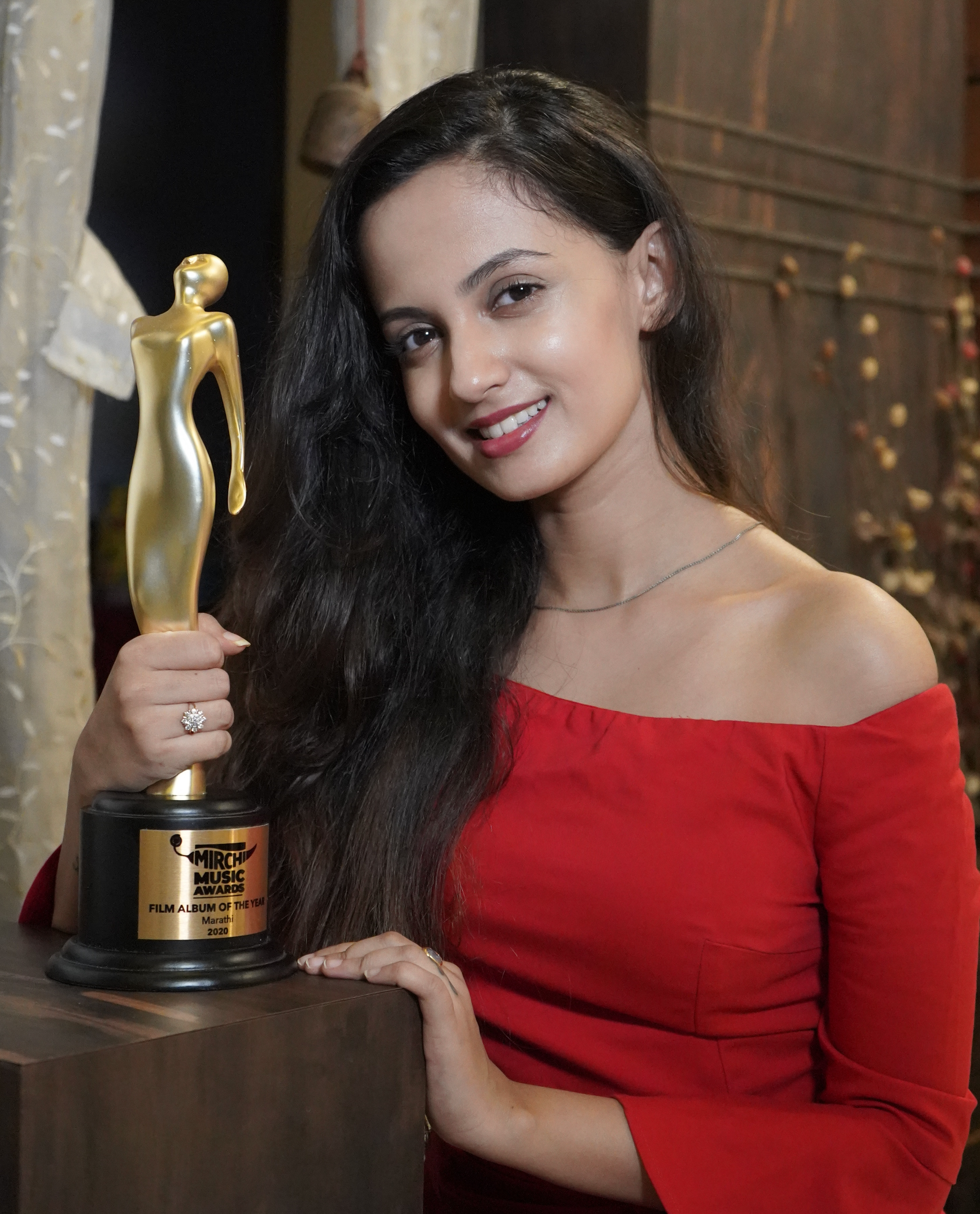
- Ketaki with mirchi music award
- Born: Nagpur, Maharashtra, India
- Education: Musicians Institute, Los Angeles, CA
- Occupations: Songwriter; Singer; Performer; Actor
- Years active: 1998–present
- Parent: Suvarna Mategaonkar
- Website: Ketaki Mategaonkar

Ketaki Mategaonkar is an Indian singer, songwriter, actress, and performer. She was born in Nagpur, Maharashtra. Mategaonkar mainly appears in Marathi cinema and Hindi album songs. She made her big-screen debut with romantic drama film Shala (2011)film is based on the a novel of the same name by Milind Bokil. The film won the Silver Lotus Award at the 59th National Film Awards in the Best Feature Film in Marathi category and National Film Award for Best Screenplay. and also a major commercial success on box office. Her performance was well received by critics and audience and she Nominated at 49th Maharashtra State Film Awards in the Best Actress category. In 2012 She teamed up with director Mahesh Manjrekar for Marathi period drama Kaksparsh.

== Family ==
She is the daughter of Parag Mategaonkar and Suvarna Mategaonkar who are a musical family. Parag is music director and Suvarna is a singer.

== Filmography ==
=== Feature films ===
All movies are in Marathi, unless mentioned.

Year	Movie	Role	Ref(s)
2012	Shala	Shirodkar	
2012	Aarohi	Aarohi	
2012	Kaksparsh	Young Uma/Durga	
2013	Taani	Taani	
2014	Timepass	Prajakta	
2015	Timepass 2	Young Prajakta	
2015	Kaksparsh	Uma	
2016	Phuntroo	Anaya	
2023	Ankush	Raavi	

=== Music videos ===
Year	Song	Language	Ref.
2018	Jarasa Tu	Marathi	
2019	Wara Pahatwara	Marathi	
2020	Tum Mil Jao	Hindi	
2021	Maybe	English	

=== Television ===
Year	Show	Role(s)	Notes	Channel	Ref.
2010	Sa Re Ga Ma Pa Marathi Li'l Champs	Contestant		Zee Marathi	

== Playback singing ==
Year	Film	Song	Ref.
2008	Dashavatar	"Phir Se Chamke Tim Tim Taare"	
2011	Shala	"Sun Zara"	
2013	Taani	"Manaat Yete Mahya"	
2013	Rangakarmi	"Ajunahi Sanjawel"	
2014	Timepaas	"Mala Ved Laagale Premache"	
2014	Phuntroo	"Kasa Jeev Guntala"	
2014	Ishq Wala Love	"Maje Tuje"	
2015	Timepass 2	"Sunya Sunya"	
2016	YZ	"Priyakara"	
2016	Photocopy	"Oli Ti Maati"	
2017	Bhatukali	"Tara Tara"	
2017	Kaksparsh	"Tu Kkame" & "Aaja Re Tu Aaja Re"	
2022	Panghrun	"Nilaai"	
2022	Story Of Laagir	Harle ga bai	
2022	De Dhakka 2	"Nazar Katyar"	
2026	Aali Mothi Shahani	"Bonita Bonita"	

== Awards ==
Year	Awards	Categories	Work	Ref.
2007	Shahu Modak Puraskar	Best Singer		
2012	Maharashtracha Favourite Kon?	Popular Face of the Year		
2012	49th Maharashtra State Awards	Best Actress	Shala	
2013	Micta Awards	Best Actress		
2013	Doordarshan Godrej Award	Popular Face of the Year		
2012	Mirchi Music Awards Marathi	Best Female Singer		
2013	Nargis Dutt Puraskar	Best Actress Special Contribution		
2014	Maharashtracha Favourite Kon?	Best Singer		
2014	Maharashtracha Favourite Kon?	Best Actress		
2014	Mirchi Music Awards	Best Album Listeners Choice		
2015	Filmfare Awards Marathi	Best Playback Singer female	Mala Ved Lagle	
2017	Sakal Premier Awards	Best Playback Singer		
2017	Mirchi Music Awards	Female Vocalist of the Year		
2018	GA DI MA Vidya Pradnya Puraskar	Special Contribution in Music		
2019	Sakal Premier Award		Anandi Gopal (Ranga Maliyela)	
2019	Mirchi Music Awards	Best Album		
2021	Youth Icon Award – Bhartiya Yuva Mancha	Youth Icon	2025	Suvarnaratna Awards- Singing
