= Shala (film) =

- Theatrical poster
- Directed by: Sujay Dahake
- Written by: Milind Bokil
- Produced by: Vivek Wagh; Nilesh Navalakha
- Starring: Anshuman Joshi; Ketaki Mategaonkar
- Cinematography: Diego Romero
- Edited by: Sujay Dahake
- Music by: Alokananda Dasgupta
- Distributed by: Great Maratha Entertainment; Nishad Audio Visuals; Navalakha Arts
- Release dates: 7 May 2011 (New York Indian Film Festival); 20 January 2012 (India)
- Country: India
- Language: Marathi
- Budget: ₹3 crore (US$310,000)
- Box office: ₹9 crore (US$930,000)

Shala (transl. School) is a 2011 Indian Marathi romantic drama film. The screenplay of film is adapted from the a novel of the same name by Milind Bokil. Directed by Sujay Dahake and produced by Vivek Wagh, Nilesh Navalakha under Great Maratha Entertainment, Nishad Audio Visuals and Navalakha Arts Banner, the film stars Anshuman Joshi and Ketaki Mategaonkar in the lead roles.

The film won the Silver Lotus Award at the 59th National Film Awards in the Best Feature Film in Marathi category and National Film Award for Best Screenplay.

== Plot ==
Set in the 70's in rural India, four 9th grade kids were writing their destiny. Joshi (14) is in love with Shirodkar (14), a beautiful girl. Both go to the same school, and study in the same class. faced with the age old question "What is love anyway?", Joshi goes through a series of events just to let the girl know about his feelings towards her. Joshi's friends on the other hand are going through the same phase of life. The difference is all four of them come from a different cultural and family background.

Surya (16) is a typical life lover and a great blend of society and hippie culture. Chitrya (14) a born genius and wants to be a scientist. He comes from a modern family setting and is the smartest one amongst the group. Favdya (15), the poorest, is the dumbest amongst all four. Joshi (14) comes from an average middle-class family, with a confused future.

Joshi wants the girl to know his feelings. He has been trying hard. He attends the same private tuitions as her just to get a glance of her. He follows her to her house everyday without her knowing about this. The story is of struggle, freedom and liberation with a spice of loneliness.

== Cast ==
- Anshuman Joshi as Mukund Joshi
- Ketaki Mategaonkar as Shirodkar
- Dilip Prabhavalkar as Appa
- Santosh Juvekar as Majarekar sir
- Jitendra Joshi as Narumama
- Amruta Khanvilkar as Paranjape Bai
- Devika Daftardar as Bendre Bai
- Nandu Madhav as Joshi's Father
- Ashwini Giri as Mukund's Mother
- Snehal Tarde as Akka
- Vaibhav Mangle as Ponkshe kaka
- Ketan Pawar as Surya(Mhatre)
- Chinmay Kulkarni as K.T.
- Unnati Agarkar as Sukadi
- Omkar Mane as Favdya
- Mukta Vaidya as Kevada
- Suhas Vedpathak as Chitre
- Shruti Velankar as Mande
- Pinak Wadikar as Bibikar
- Kaumudi Walokar as Anita Ambekar
- Anand Ingale
- Akshaya Deodhar

== Awards ==
Award	Category	Result
59th National Film Awards	Best Feature Film in Marathi	Won
59th National Film Awards	Best Screenplay for Avinash Deshpande Nigdi	Won
49th Maharashtra State Film Awards	Maharashtra State Film Award for Best Film	Won
