= Khisa (film) =

- Directed by: Raj Pritam More
- Story by: Kailash Waghmare
- Produced by: Santosh Maithani, Raj Pritam More
- Edited by: Santosh Maithani
- Music by: Parijat Chakraborty
- Production companies: PP Cine Production Mumbai and Laaltippa Films
- Release date: March 2020 (Istanbul)
- Running time: 16 minutes
- Country: India
- Language: Marathi

Khisa (lit. 'Pocket') is a 2020 Marathi language short film directed by Raj Pritam More, starring actors local to the village of Amantpur, where it was filmed. The movie was selected for screening at the 51st International Film Festival of India.

== Cast ==
- Kailash Waghmare
- Meenakasi Rathod
- Shruti Madhudeep
- Dr Sheshpal Ganvir
- Vedant Shrisagar

== Production ==
Khisa is a short film in the Marathi language of India, directed by Raj Pritam More. It was written by Kailash Waghmare, and co-produced by More and Santosh Maithani.

It was filmed in the village of Amantpur, Akola district, India, using local actors.

== Release ==
Khisa was released in Istanbul, Turkey, in March 2020.

== Awards and nominations ==
- Qualified to compete for the Golden Star Awards at the annual live screening gala of Istanbul Film Awards (IFA), March 2021
- Official selection at 51st Indian International Film Festival 2021
- Official selection at Montreal Independent Film Festival in Canada 2020, and 26th (KIFF) Kolkata International Film Festival 2020
- Official Selection at Dioroma International film festival 2020
- Official Selection at Jaipur International Film Festival 2020.
- Official Selection at Singapore international film festival 2020.
- Official Selection at Dublin International Film Festival
- Official Selection at Mumbai International Cult Film Festival
- Official Selection at Dioroma Indie Shorts Awards Buenos Aires, Argentina 2021
