= Ajoba =

- Directed by: Sujay Dahake
- Written by: Gauri Bapat
- Screenplay by: Gauri Bapat
- Produced by: Lalasaheb Shinde; Rajendra Shinde
- Starring: Urmila Matondkar
- Cinematography: Diego Romero
- Music by: Saket Kanetkar
- Production companies: Supreme Motion Pictures Pvt Ltd; Illusion Ethereal
- Release date: 9 May 2014
- Country: India
- Language: Marathi
- Budget: ₹4 crore

Ajoba is a 2014 Indian Marathi-language film directed by Sujay Dahake and written by Gauri Bapat. The film is based on the life of a leopard named "Ajoba", who, after being rescued from a well in Maharashtra's Ahmednagar district, covered over 120 kilometres (75 miles) in 29 days in 2009 from Malshej Ghat to Sanjay Gandhi National Park in Mumbai. The film received mixed to positive reviews from critics.

== Plot ==
Purva Rao, a biologist and leopard conservationist, comes to the forests of Junnar to study the leopards living there and their reported attacks on humans. During her work, she goes with officials from the forest department to rescue a leopard who had fallen into a well. The leopard is rescued after three days of efforts. Before the leopard is released, Rao names the leopard as "Ajoba" (grandfather in Marathi) and puts a GPS collar and microchip on the leopard to track his movements. Ajoba, after being released near Malshej Ghat, descends the Sahyadri hill range in the direction of Mumbai. Over 29 days, Ajoba covers a distance of about 120 kilometres (75 miles); he crosses forests, hilly terrain, rural farmlands, railway lines and the urban fringe of Mumbai – all without harming any humans along the way – before reaching an industrial estate in Vasai. Thereafter, he crosses the Ulhas River and reaches Sanjay Gandhi National Park within the city limits of Mumbai. Rao, who has followed Ajoba's journey through the collar on the leopard, then loses track of the animal. Two years later, Ajoba is killed in a collision with a truck while crossing a road.

== Cast ==
- Urmila Matondkar as Ms. Purva Rao
- Hrishikesh Joshi as Dnyanoba Sawant
- Dilip Prabhavalkar as Prabhakar Sarnaik
- Shrikant Yadav as Mr. Shinde
- Om Bhutkar as Shiva Kamble
- Neha Mahajan as Sushma
- Shashank Shende as Mr. Jadhav
- Suhas Shirsat as Mr. Ganpule
- Anita Date-Kelkar as Mugdha
- Chinmay Kulkarni as Nilesh
- Yashpal Sharma
- Ganesh Mayekar

== Production ==
The film is based on the real-life story of the leopard Ajoba, who had fallen into a well, while chasing a dog, in a farm in Takli Dhokeshwar, a village about 60 kilometres (37 miles) north of Pune. The leopard was rescued after three days by the forest department and the wildlife researcher Vidya Athreya. Before Ajoba was released near Malshej Ghat, Athreya collared the leopard and placed a microchip in his tail, which made Ajoba the first radio-collared leopard in Maharashtra. Over the next 25 days, Ajoba travelled around 120 kilometres (75 miles), crossing highways, railway lines, villages and hills, and thus reached SGNP. Athreya lost track of Ajoba in July 2009, a few days after the leopard was seen to have swum across the Ulhas River from tracking data. Ajoba was killed on the night of 1 December 2011 when he collided with a truck on Ghodbunder Road. Ajoba's body was identified by Forest department officials using the microchip in his tail.

After Dahake came to know about Ajoba's story, he reached to Athreya for advice as well as for permission to adapt her story into a film. Dahake initially wished to make a documentary, but later settlled on making a feature film. Athreya shared her research and photographs with Dahake and Gauri Bapat, the script writer. The character Purva Rao is inspired by Athreya; some of the incidents in the film were fictionalised. The film was made with a budget of ₹4 crore. The film's script was written between February and July 2012. Some of the shots of Ajoba in the film were made using computer-generated imagery, while others were made using shots of wild leopards filmed over six days near Bera, a village in Rajasthan. According to Dahake, filming in Junnar was affected by apprehensive villagers who opposed leopard conservation; Matondkar then interacted with the villagers to neutralise their concerns. The film's release was held up for some time by the Censor Board, as shooting films on leopards was banned in India at the time. Dahake wanted to release the film to theatres by the end of 2013; the film ended up being released on 9 May 2014.

== Reception ==
Sunil Nandgaokar, reviewing Ajoba for The Indian Express, was critical of the screenplay, which he said lost its grip midway through the film. He felt that "the film-maker could not choose between the documentary format and cinema format", which robbed the movie of its thrill. He praised the performance of Matondkar and the other cast members as well as the film's visual effects, but criticised the cinematography. Nandgaokar felt that Dahakar had only stressed on the conservationist themes of the film.

A positive review of the film in The Times of India described Ajoba as "nothing short of a spectacular piece of cinema". The review specially praised Matondkar's performance and the film's themes.

The film was positively reviewed in Loksatta, with the special effects and the cast performances coming in for special praise.

A review in Divya Marathi praised Matondkar's performance but did not find Prabhavalkar and Bhutkar's performances to be memorable. The review considered the film to be informative for a general audience, and criticised the side plot about Bhutkar's character.
