= St Joseph's Boys' High School, Pune =

St.Joseph High School, Boys'
- Garrison Town, Khadki, Pune, Maharashtra; India

Information
- Type: Privately Owned (till 4th grade), Government Aided (5th grade onwards)
- Motto: Quanti Est Sapere (How valuable is wisdom)
- Established: 1951
- Authority: Poona Diocesan Education Society
- Principal: Fr. Denis Joseph
- Head of school: Fr. Denis Joseph
- Staff: 75
- Grades: KG, Class 1 - 10
- Enrollment: around 2,400 currently studying
- Campus type: Day school
- Houses: Nehru, Tagore, Bose, Vivekananda
- Website: -

St. Joseph Boys’ High School is a day school located in Khadki of Pune district, in the Indian state of Maharashtra. The school is an English Medium School established and managed by the Poona Diocesan Education Society. It is recognized by the Government of Maharashtra and consists of ten standards beyond Pre-Primary classes. It primarily prepares pupils for the Secondary School Certificate (S.S.C) Examination.

St. Joseph Boys’ High School aims at an inclusive education – academic, physical, moral and spiritual – primarily to Catholics, but welcoming children irrespective of religion or race as is consistent with Catholic principles. The patron St. Joseph is a model of living for its staff and students.

== Location ==
The school is situated in the northern part of Pune city, in the town of Kirkee, in the vicinity of the heritage monument of the St. Ignatius Church, the Court, and the Kirkee Cantonment Board. The school is surrounded by the lush green trees on one side, resulting in a calm and pleasant atmosphere.

== Facilities ==
The school has grounds plus two storied quadrangular building where classrooms are situated. It has Physics, Chemistry and Biology labs. The school has two computer labs, a drawing room and a library. The school building is surrounded by a ground used for sports and an assembly ground. St Joseph's school has a big auditorium where various programmes and meetings are held regularly.

== Academics ==
The school is divided into the pre-primary, primary, secondary and higher secondary sections. The school is affiliated to the Maharashtra State Board of Secondary and Higher Secondary Education. 10th standard students give the S.S.C. exams respectively each year.

== Sports ==
The school focuses in hockey and often competes in Inter-School Hockey Tournaments; seniors, juniors, sub-junior section titles have been won by the school.

Khadki is thought by some to be the cradle of Indian hockey. The school shares this tradition with some other schools of Khadki area, and has won many laurels.

== Past principals ==
- 1963 - 1979 : Late Rev. Dr. Fr. Manuel Mascarenhas
- 1979 - 1980 : Fr. James Luke.
- 1980 - 1984 : Late Rev. Dr. Fr. Manuel Mascarenhas
- 1984 - 1989 : Late Fr. Nelson Machado.
- 1989 - 1995 : Fr. James Luke.
- 1995 - 2000 : Fr. Joachim Patrick.
- 2000 - 2004 : Fr. Isidore Soares.
- 2004 - 2006 : Fr. Louis D’Mello.
- 2006 - 2010 : Fr. Elias Rodrigues.
- 2010 - 2013 : Fr. Louis D’Mello.
- 2013 – 2015: Mrs. Rosie Siqueira.
- 2015 - 2023: Fr. Anand Gaikwad
- 2023 - Today: Fr. Denis Joseph

== Notable alumni ==
- Kay Kay Menon, is an Indian actor.
- Ruturaj Gaikwad, is a First Class Cricketer
