= Vaibhav Mangle =

Indian actor (born 1975)

- Born: 20 June 1975 (age 51); Devrukh, Ratnagiri, Maharashtra, India.
- Occupation: Actor
- Style: Comedy

Vaibhav Mangle (born 1975) is a Marathi actor and Hindi film, television and stage actor, noted for his comic roles in Marathi theatre and Marathi films and television from India. Anand Ingle and Vaibhav Mangle are seen playing BL Pathak in Zee Marathi's TV series Shejari Shejari Pakke Shejari.

== Television ==
He is well known for his skits in Fu Bai Fu, a Marathi standup comedy TV show on Zee Marathi. He also plays the main role, along with Anand Ingle, in the comedy show Shejari Shejari Pakke Shejari. It was also aired on Zee Marathi. In this serial, he plays the character of Brijlal Pathak, also known as Birju. Also working in Shirdi Ke Saibaba, on Sony.

1. Ek Gaav Bhutacha
2. Malwani Days
3. Majhe Pati Saubhagyawati
4. Shejari Shejari Pakke Shejari
5. Fu Bai Fu
6. Kulvadhu

== Filmography ==
His movies include Harishchandrachi Factory, Kaksparsh, Shikshanachya Aaicha Gho,Navra Maza Navsacha, Shahanpan Dega Deva, Fakta Ladh Mhana, Shala, Touring Talkies, Timepass are some of the successful movies in which he played an important role.

Following table shows list of films

Year	Title	Language	Role	Notes
2027	Khashaba	Marathi		
2025	Kurla To Vengurla	Marathi	Bajirao Tambat	
2025	Mu. Po. Bombilwaadi	Marathi	Varvante	
2024	Phullwanti	Marathi	Martand Bhairavacharya	
2024	Navra Maza Navsacha 2	Marathi	Devrukhkar aka Sabu Kalia	
2024	Hoy Maharaja	Marathi	Anna	
2022	Sher Shivraj	Marathi	Gopinath Pant Bokila	
2022	Pawankhind	Marathi	Gangadharpant	
2019	Triple Seat	Marathi	Meera's Father	
2018	Shikari	Marathi	Gulaabrao Phoolsundar	
2015	Timepass 2	Marathi	Prajakta's father Madhavrao Lele	
2014	Sanngto Aika	Marathi	Palav	
2014	Postcard	Marathi		
2014	Timepass	Marathi	Prajakta's father (Shakal)	
2013	Chaandi	Marathi		
2013	Touring Talkies	Marathi	Shubhnya	
2013	Kokanastha-Taath Kana Haach Baana	Marathi		
2012	Pipani	Marathi		
2012	Kaksparsh	Marathi	Upadhyay	
2012	Shala	Marathi	Ponkshe Kaka	
2012	Kutumb	Marathi	Sawkar	
2011	Fakta Ladh Mhana	Marathi	Sawkar Kulkarni	
2011	Shahanpan Dega Deva	Marathi		
2010	City of Gold	Marathi	DoctorSaheb	
2010	Harishchandrachi Factory	Marathi	Gajabhau	
2010	Shikshanacha Aaicha Gho	Marathi		
2004	Navra Maza Navsacha	Marathi	Passenger with helmet	

=== Web series ===
Year	Serial	Role	Notes
2022	RaanBaazaar	Inspector Palande	

== Drama ==
He played the main role in the Marathi play Ek Daav Bhatacha. He was also part of famous Marathi play Mukkam Post Bombilwadi.

He played one of the lead roles in Albattya Galbattya and Iblis.

His latest Marathi Natak is Sanjya Chhaya, directed by Chandrakant Kulkarni and Murderwale Kulkarni Marathi Natak directed by Santosh Pawar.
