= Essel Vision Productions =

Indian company

- Type: Private
- Industry: Conglomerate
- Genre: Entertainment
- Founded: 1995
- Founder: Subhash Chandra
- Headquarters: Mumbai, Maharashtra, India
- Area served: India
- Key people: Subhash Chandra
- Products: Television programs, Motion pictures
- Parent: Essel Group
- Website: www.esselvision.com

Essel Vision Productions is an Indian company which produces Indian soap operas, reality TV, comedy, game shows, entertainment and factual programming in several Indian languages.

Essel Vision is promoted by Subhash Chandra and is a private company. Its most successful works till date include Sa Re Ga Ma Pa and Dance India Dance.

== Past shows ==
- 2012 Fear Files: Darr Ki Sacchi Tasvirein
- 2018 Love Me India
- 2013 Khelti Hai Zindagi Aankh Micholi
- 2014 Gangs of Haseepur
- 2014 Maharakshak: Aryan
- 2020 Starika
- 2009 Dance India Dance (season 1)
- 2010 Dance India Dance (season 2)
- 2012 Dance India Dance (season 3)
- 2014 Dance India Dance (season 4)
- 2012 Dance India Dance Li'l Masters (season 1)
- 2013 Dance India Dance Li'l Masters (season 2)
- 2014 Dance India Dance Li'l Masters (season 3)
- 1995 Sa Re Ga Ma
- 1996 Sa Re Ga Ma
- 1997 Sa Re Ga Ma
- 1999 Sa Re Ga Ma Pa
- 2000 Sa Re Ga Ma Pa
- 2005 Sa Re Ga Ma Pa Challenge 2005
- 2006 Sa Re Ga Ma Pa Ek Main Aur Ek Tu
- 2007 Sa Re Ga Ma Pa Challenge 2007
- 2007 Sa Re Ga Ma Pa Li'l Champs International
- 2009 Sa Re Ga Ma Pa Challenge 2009
- 2009 Sa Re Ga Ma Pa Li'l Champs 2009
- 2010 Sa Re Ga Ma Pa Singing Superstar
- 2011 Sa Re Ga Ma Pa Li'l Champs 2011
- 2012 Sa Re Ga Ma Pa Hindi 2012
- 2021 Sa Re Ga Ma Pa Sapno Ki Shuruwaat
- 2020 Sa Re Ga Ma Pa Li'l Champs 2020
- 2019 Gudiya Hamari Sabhi Pe Bhari
- 2019 Sa Re Ga Ma Pa Keralam
- 2013 Dance India Dance Super Moms season 1
- 2014 Sa Re Ga Ma Pa Li'l Champs 2014-2015
- 2015 Maharakshak Devi
- 2015 Dance India Dance Super Moms season 2
- 2019 Ishq Subhan Allah
- 2017 Yaaradi Nee Mohini
- 2016 Lattu Nanga Hogaya
- 2019 Karunamoyee Rani Rashmoni
- 2019 Netaji
- 2019 Dance India Dance
- 2018 Dance Kerala Dance
- 2011 Classic Legends
- 2018 Main Bhi Ardhangini
