= Ravi Jadhav =

Marathi film director

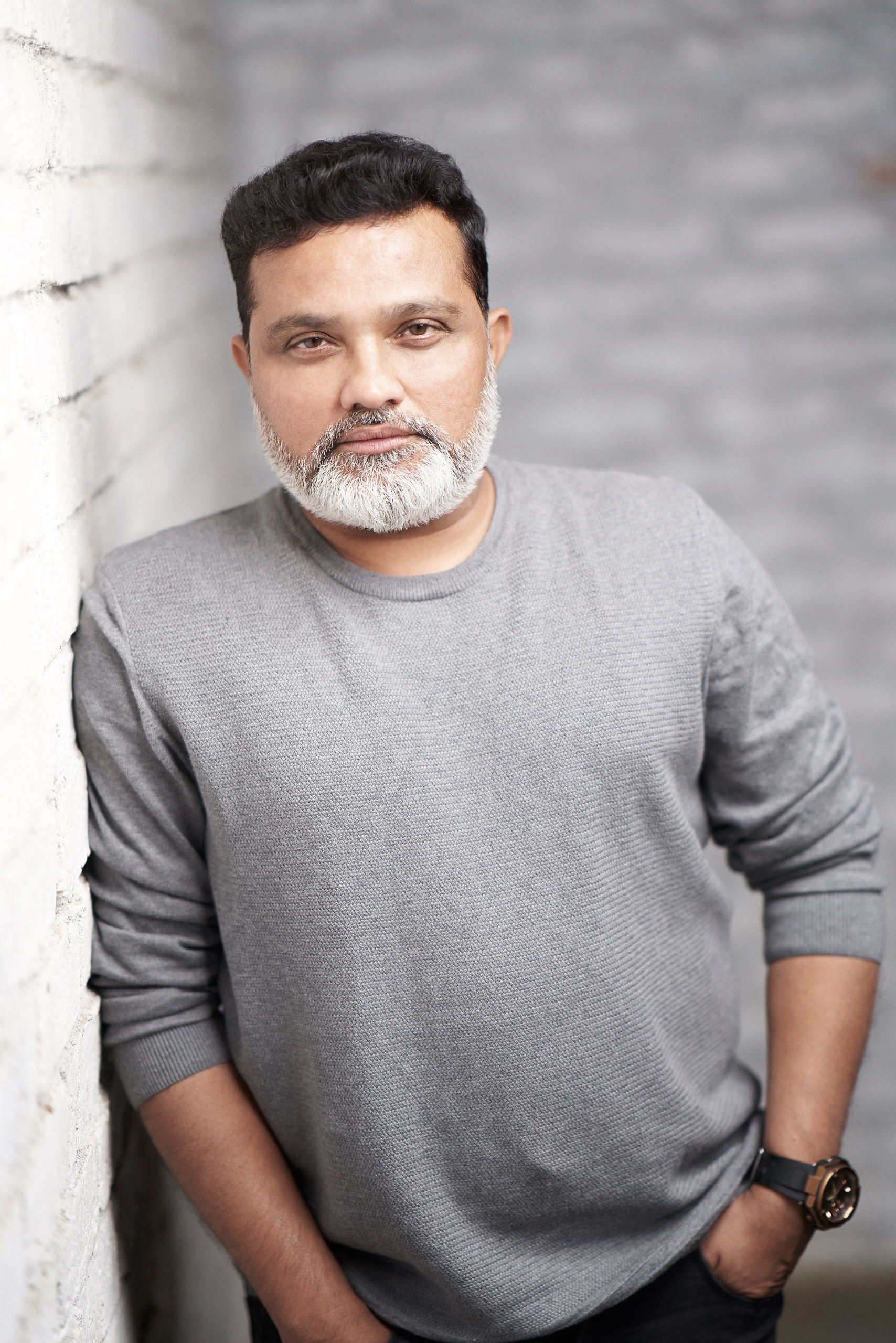
- Born: Ravindra Harishchandra Jadhav; 22 September 1971 (age 55); Mumbai, Maharashtra, India
- Occupation: Film director
- Spouse: Meghana Jadhav
- Children: 2
- Parent(s): Harishchandra Jadhav (father); Shubhangini Jadhav (mother)
- Website: www.ravijadhav.com

Ravindra Jadhav (born 22 September 1971) known professionally as Ravi Jadhav is an Indian film director, actor, screenwriter and producer. He made his directorial debut with the Marathi musical drama Natarang in 2010. Ravi studied in Sir J.J Institute of Applied art and won the 2009 National Film Award for Best Feature Film in Marathi.

Some of his other films are Balak Palak, produced by Ritesh Deshmukh, and Balgandharva, which won three national awards at the 59th National Film Awards.

== Early life ==
Ravi was born in Mumbai, India to Harishchandra Jadhav, and Shubhangini Jadhav. He studied Visual Communication and Graphic Design at Sir J.J Institute of Applied art. Soon after he graduated, Ravi began his career as a creative director and copywriter for a leading advertising agency.

== Career ==
Ravi made his directorial debut with Marathi musical drama Natarang in 2010, which is based on the 1978 novel Natrang by Dr. Anand Yadav. His next film was Balgandharva. It was screened at the Cannes and Venice film festivals.

Ravi achieved an image of a director who does not shy away from bold topics by making films on sex education (Balak-Palak) and the life of nude models in fine arts (such as in his 2018 film, Nude).

He also directed Tomorrow's Decided, a music video for Pentagram, an electro-rock band based in Mumbai. He also wrote lyrics for Saazani, a Marathi single, sung by Shekhar Ravjiani, and directed the music video.

== National honours and recognitions ==
- His Short Fiction film Mitraa (2014) won Silver Lotus Award in the |Best Short Fiction Film category at the 62nd National Film Awards held in 2015.

Name of Award	Name of Film	Language	Awardee(s)	Cash prize
Best Short Fiction Film	Mitraa	Marathi	Producer: Athaansh Communications; Director: Ravi Jadhav	₹ 50,000/- Each

- His film Balgandharva (2011) won the maximum number of Silver Lotus Awards (3) at the 59th National Film Awards held in 2011.

Name of Award	Name of Film(s)	Language(s)	Awardee(s)	Cash prize
Best Male Playback Singer	Balgandharva	Marathi	Anand Bhate	₹50,000 (US$520)
Best Costume Design	Balgandharva	Marathi	Neeta Lulla	₹50,000 (US$520)
Best Make-up Artist	Balgandharva	Marathi	Vikram Gaikwad	₹50,000 (US$520)

- His film Natarang (2010) won the best Feature film award in the Regional Awards at the 57th National Film Awards held in 2009.

Name of Award	Name of Film	Awardee(s)	Cash prize
Best Feature Film in Marathi	Natarang	Producer: Zee Entertainment Enterprises Ltd. Director: Ravindra Harishchandra Jadhav	₹ 1,00,000/- Each

- His film Natarang (2010) won seven awards at the annual Zee Gaurav Awards ceremony, including best director for Ravindra Jadhav, best music composition for Ajay–Atul and best supporting actor for Kishor Kadam.

== Controversies ==
Ravi Jadhav's movie Nude was pulled out from the Indian Panorama section of the upcoming International Film Festival of India (IFFI). The Information and Broadcasting Ministry of India explained that the film was not complete and hence did not have the censorship certificate. The director maintained that he had made a sincere movie. The Central Board Of Film Certification (CBFC) set up a special jury presided by actor Vidya Balan to view the film. It was then passed without any cuts and given an A certification.

== Filmography ==
Year	Title	Language	Notes
2009	Natarang	Marathi	
2011	Balgandharva	Marathi	
2013	Balak-Palak	Marathi	
2014	Timepass	Marathi	
2014	Rege	Marathi	Producer only
2015	Coffee Ani Barach Kahi	Marathi	Producer only
2015	Timepass 2	Marathi	
2015	Bioscope	Marathi	
2016	Banjo	Hindi	Debut in Hindi
2017	Kachcha Limboo	Marathi	Acting debut
2018	Nude	Marathi	
2019	Rampaat	Marathi	
2022	Timepass 3	Marathi	
2023	Taali	Hindi	TV series on JioCinema
2024	Main Atal Hoon	Hindi	
