= List of harmonium players =

The following is a list of notable harmonium players.

== Harmonium players ==
- Aditya Oke
- Alistair Iain Paterson
- Amjad Sabri
- Arwind Thatte
- Bhupen Hazarika
- Farrukh Fateh Ali Khan
- Fanna-Fi-Allah
- George Harrison
- Georges Lamothe
- George Martin
- Govindrao Patwardhan
- G. Ramanathan
- Ivor Cutler
- Jyoti Goho
- Kavus Torabi
- Kedar Naphade
- Krishna Das
- Larry Knechtel
- Lisa Alvarado
- Jai Uttal
- Robert ÆOLUS Myers
- Govindrao Tembe
- Husnlal Bhagatram
- Maqbool Ahmed Sabri
- Mehmood Dhaulpuri
- M. S. Baburaj
- Nico
- Nóirín Ní Riain
- Nusrat Fateh Ali Khan
- Olivia Chaney
- Patrayani Seetharama Sastry
- Prakash Ulliyeri
- Rajendra Vaishmapayan
- Raju Ananthaswamy
- Richard Tandy
- Rijram Desad
- R. K. Bijapure
- Sabri Brothers
- Sadakat Aman Khan
- Santosh Ghante
- Satyajit Prabhu
- Shankar–Jaikishan
- Shapla Salique
- Shilpa Ray
- Sudhir Nayak
- Tori Amos
- Tulsidas Borkar
- Tymon Dogg
- Ustad Qasim
- Vidyadhar Oke
- William D. Drake
- Witthüser & Westrupp
- Wynne Paris
- Jayanta Bose

== See also ==
- Lists of musicians
