= Marathi Abhimaangeet =

Song by Numerous artists
- Language: Marathi
- Songwriter: Suresh Bhat
- Composer: Kaushal Inamdar

Music video
- Marathi Abhiman Geet on YouTube

Marathi Abhimaangeet is a song written in Marathi by the noted poet Suresh Bhat and set to music by well known composer Kaushal Inamdar.

== Introduction ==
The composition is probably one of its kind with over 450 artistes having lent their voice. The song was released under the name Marathi Abhimaangeet in Thane on 27 February 2010, on the occasion of Marathi Bhasha Diwas.

The Marathi Abhimaangeet has been sung by 112 established singers and a chorus of 356 upcoming singers. It has been recorded across 3 studios in Mumbai, Chennai and Thane with 12 sound engineers and 65 musicians. It is a very melodious composition which aims to reconcile every Marathi-speaking individual to the beauty of the language. More than 2500 accomplished singers and musicians have directly or indirectly contributed towards it.

== About the poet ==
Suresh Bhat is a noted Marathi poet from Vidarbha land of Maharashtra. Suresh Bhat loved Maharashtra and Marathi language very deeply. He made the entire Maharashtra his own, and devoted himself towards Marathi poetry. He proudly carried the roots of the Maharashtrian soil as ornaments on the body. This immense love and pride towards the state and its language gave rise to a wonderful composition now popularly known as 'Marathi Abhimaan Geet'.

== Idea ==
Kaushal Inamdar noticed the diminishing respect for the Marathi language in its own motherland, Maharashtra. He came across many incidents where he experienced secondary treatment meted out to his mother-tongue Marathi, in Mumbai, which is supposed to the heartland of Marathi speaking people. On his blog Music and Noise he particularly mentions an incident where he was mistreated in a plush south Mumbai retail chain, because he chose to speak in his mother-tongue. A chance conversation with a friend working for a radio station made Inamdar embark on the colossal journey. Asked why the channel did not play Marathi songs, Inamdar was surprised to learn it was their policy not to. He was further dumbfounded on learning that the bosses felt Marathi songs were downmarket. He asked his friend whether the channel had any such policy not to play Tamil songs in Chennai, or Kannada songs in Bangalore.

Noticing that Marathi was slowly losing its foothold and importance in its hometown, Inamdar decided to compose a song in Marathi which would awaken love and respect for the language in the hearts of all Marathi-speaking individuals. This is where the concept of developing a Marathi anthem started. The project was fondly called 'Marathi Asmita' which means The Pride of Marathi. Inamdar chose a very famous poem by the name 'Marathi Abhimaangeet' which was written by the veteran poet Suresh Bhat. The music was composed by Kaushal Inamdar himself.

== The Marathi Asmita Project ==
Inamdar began work on the project in 2009. He decided to open a portal under the name Marathi Asmita through which he could reach out to the Marathi-speaking populace and incorporate their suggestions and views. Inamdar did not want the project to become a political product and hence did not accept any political sponsorship. He also refused Uddhav Thackeray's offer of Rs 1.1 million, for it would then become a Shiv Sena song. He accepted only Rs 500 each from Uddhav and his partymen, as well as from Raj Thackeray and MNS cadre.

The entire project was touted as a mass awakening movement and a large percentage of the expenses have been borne by common people, who in some manner wished to contribute towards the song. More than 1400 people have generously made monetary contributions. Their names have been included the CD booklet. The remaining deficit of Rs. 150,000 was met by Inamdar himself.

== Singers ==
For the first time in musical history, more than 450 accomplished singers have come together for a single song. 112 professional playback singers have sung one line each for this composition. From 10-year-old Mugdha Vaishampayan to senior singer Vitthal Umap, each singer has lent his or her own special style and presence to make this song a collage of melodious voices.

Complete list of singers in order of singing is as follows:

Ravindra Sathe,
Ashwini Bhide-Deshpande,
Suresh Wadkar,
Ashok Patki,
Asha Khadilkar,
Padmaja Phenani-Joglekar,
Hariharan,
Arati Ankalikar-Tikekar,
Satyasheel Deshpande,
Shridhar Phadke,
Sadhana Sargam,
Shounak Abhisheki,
Sanjeev Chimmalgi,
Omkar Dadarkar,
Savani Shende-Sathaye,
Swapnil Bandodkar,
Bela Shende,
Avadhoot Gupte,
Prasad Oak,
Sunil Barve,
Shailesh Datar,
Sumeet Raghavan,
Madhurani Prabhulkar,
Seema Deshmukh,
Swanand Kirkire,
Vitthal Umap,
Devaki Pandit,
Uttara Kelkar,
Ranjana Joglekar,
Sharad Jambhekar,
Ravindra Bijur,
Mahesh Mutalik,
Aniruddha Joshi,
Saleel Kulkarni,
Madhuri Karmarkar,
Mrudula Dadhe-Joshi,
Madhav Bhagwat,
Suchitra Bhagwat,
Anagha Pendse,
Varsha Bhave,
Bhagyashree Mule,
Sangeeta Chitale,
Anuja Vartak,
Sayali Oak,
Madhura Kumbhar,
Aanandi Joshi,
Anagha Dhomse,
Mahalakshmi Iyer,
Milind Ingle,
Achyut Thakur,
Ashok Hande,
Udesh Umap,
Aadesh Umap,
Sandesh Umap,
Nandesh Umap,
Vaishali Samant,
Ajay–Atul,
Shankar Mahadevan,
Hamsika Iyer,
Nihira Joshi,
Ajit Parab,
Hrishikesh Kamerkar,
Amol Bawdekar,
Yogita Pathak,
Vibhavari Apte-Joshi,
Madhura Datar,
Amruta Natu,
Sanjeevani Bhelande,
Milind Joshi,
Manisha Joshi,
Nilesh Moharir,
Yogita Chitale,
Kalyani Pande-Salunke,
Raja Kale,
Ram Deshpande,
Anand Sawant,
Mandar Apte,
Hrishikesh Ranade,
Abhijeet Rane,
Jeetendra Abhyankar,
Neha Rajpal,
Shilpa Pai,
Janhavi Prabhu-Arora,
Swapnaja Lele,
Sonali Karnik,
Mithilesh Patankar,
Vinay Rajwade,
Mayuresh Pai,
Manoj Desai,
Prashant Kalundrekar,
Tyagraj Khadilkar,
Amruta Kale,
Sandeep Ubale,
Mugdha Vaishampayan,
Kartiki Gaikwad,
Prathamesh Laghate,
Rohit Raut,
Arya Ambekar
and Chorus.

== The recording ==
The actual recording of the song took place over a period of 15 months across 3 different studios in Mumbai, Chennai and Thane. A part of the song was recorded in A. R. Rahman's studio in Chennai. Murugan Mohan, a South Indian music composer, managed to book it for Kaushal Inamdar. He also booked Ilaiyaraaja's orchestra which consists of some the most famous musicians. The Chennai leg of the recording was completed under the supervision of S. Shivkumar, and the Mumbai recording was done by Avadhoot Wadkar. Vishwadeep Chatterjee was the sound mixer. Chinmay Harshe recorded the chorus voices of 350 professional singers. The chorus consisted of Non-Marathi singers as well.

== Album release ==
The song was released in a special edition album called Marathi Abhimaangeet. Besides the song, this album also contains an instrumental rendition of the same, two more songs by Kusumagraj and Ashok Bagwe and also a booklet emphasizing the rich cultural heritage of the language. The occasion was graced by the presence of eminent Marathi personalities from different fields. Some prominent names include Gautam Rajadhyaksha, Sai Paranjpye, Anil Awachat, Prabhakar Panshikar amongst others.

== Post release ==
The song instantly connected with the Marathi populace and became a hit. Shemaroo Entertainment is the digital partner and is set to make this song available across all digital platforms. On 11 March 2010, Tata Indicom, a leading network provider tied up with the '’marathi abhimaangeet'’ and made it available as a customer caller tune and also on their live music stations.

== Song lyrics ==
लाभले अम्हास भाग्य बोलतो मराठी

जाहलो खरेच धन्य ऐकतो मराठी

धर्म पंथ जात एक जाणतो मराठी

एवढ्या जगात माय मानतो मराठी

बोलतो मराठी, ऐकतो मराठी

जाणतो मराठी, मानतो मराठी

आमुच्या मनामनांत दंगते मराठी

आमुच्या रगारगात रंगते मराठी

आमुच्या उराउरांत स्पंदते मराठी

आमुच्या नसानसांत नाचते मराठी

आमुच्या पिलापिलांत जन्मते मराठी

आमुच्या लहानग्यांत रांगते मराठी

आमुच्या मुलांमुलीत खेळते मराठी

आमुच्या घराघरांत वाढते मराठी

आमुच्या कुलाकुलात नांदते मराठी

येथेल्या फुलाफुलांत हासते मराठी

येथल्या दिशादिशांत दाटते मराठी

येथल्या नगानगात गर्जते मराठी

येथल्या दरीदरीत हिंडते मराठी

येथल्या वनावनात गुंजते मराठी

येथल्या तरुलतात साजते मराठी

येथल्या कळीकळीत लाजते मराठी

येथल्या नभामधून वर्षते मराठी

येथल्या पिकांमधून डोलते मराठी

येथल्या नद्यांमधून वाहते मराठी

येथल्या चराचरांत राहते मराठी

— Suresh Bhat, Labhale Amhas Bhagya Bolto Marathi

== Legacy ==
Kaushal Inamdar succeeded to a huge extent in creating an awareness and love for Marathi in the hearts of the listeners. The song reached out to millions of people scattered across the globe. Earlier FM channels in Mumbai, capital of Marathi state of Maharashtra, and dominated by Marathi speaking public, refused to play Marathi music on air. However the Marathi Abhimaangeet brought out a paradigm shift in this attitude. Bowing down to public pressure and demand, almost all leading FM stations began playing local Marathi music on air. Inamdar has managed to salvage the language without having resorted to any political play. In collaboration with zenage studios, Inamdar developed an iPhone application which allows the users to mark themselves dynamically on a world map. This unique piece of promotion allows everyone to see for themselves the reach of the song.

Veteran Bollywood actor Amitabh Bachchan felicitated Kaushal Inamdar on his efforts and lauded the composition.

On 15 August 2010, 1560 students of A. B. Goregaonkar English School, in Goregaon, Mumbai came together under the guidance of Kaushal Inamdar and Sadhana Sargam and successfully sang the song as a chorus. The event was covered live by many leading news channels.
