= Vidyadhar Oke =

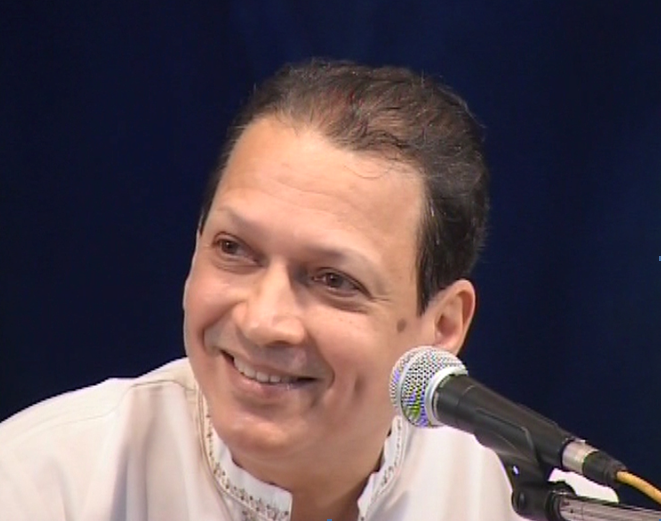

Background information
- Born: Vidyadhar Gopal Oke; 30 May 1952 (age 74); Mumbai, India
- Origin: Maharashtra, India
- Genres: Pharmacology, Indian Classical Music, Musicology, Astrology
- Occupations: Harmonium player, researcher, orator, author, adviser, music director
- Years active: 1972–present
- Website: 22shruti.com

Vidyadhar Oke (born 1952) is an Indian doctor, musicologist, harmonium player, and astrology consultant, who has done research in the use of shrutis (microtones) in Indian classical music and created a unique 22-shruti version of the harmonium.

== Early life ==
Oke is a Doctor of Medicine, MBBS, MD (pharmacology) from University of Mumbai, India. He later trained in management at the London Business School and Duke University, U.S.A; and in clinical research at Wellcome Trust, UK. Oke was fortunate to be trained at the Wellcome Research Laboratories at Beckenham, U.K., where 5 Nobel laureates had worked at a time. Oke met Rajiv Gandhi, the ex-prime minister of India in the "Young Scientists' Meet" convened by Raghunath Anant Mashelkar. For years, he gave services in the Pharmaceutical Industry in organizations including Wockhardt, GlaxoSmithKline, Piramal Group; and at 52 years, he retired as President and dedicated himself to music research.

Oke was educated at Raja Shivaji Vidyalaya (formerly known as King George High School), and Ramnarain Ruia College. He graduated from King Edward Memorial Hospital and Seth Gordhandas Sunderdas Medical College. While in school, Oke was selected to play a Chess match with Ramchandra Sapre, the first winner of the Indian Chess Championship. Oke won Badminton championships including the Inter-School/Collegiate and open events convened by Cricket Club of India, Matunga Gymkhana and Central Indian Railways Institute, Mumbai.

== Musical career ==
Oke's maternal grandfather and mother Shanta were harmonium players. Shanta was also a singer and student of Narayanrao Vyas, a disciple of Vishnu Digambar Paluskar. Oke, a renowned third generation harmonium artist playing the instrument since the age of four, later learned from the maestro late Pandit Govindrao Patwardhan for 25 years to become an ace Harmonium player. His first public performance was a harmonium solo in 1972 on Mumbai Doordarshan. He was a performing member at the National Centre for the Performing Arts (Mumbai) and played harmonium in music programmes at the centre, arranged by Purushottam Laxman Deshpande and Ashok Ranade. He taught Harmonium as Hon. Lecturer at the Department of Music, University of Mumbai, when Ashok Ranade was the head. He accompanied on harmonium; singers including Asha Bhosale, Vasantrao Deshpande, Sudhir Phadke, Kumar Gandharva, Manik Varma, Malabika Kanan, Rashid Khan, C. R. Vyas, Jitendra Abhisheki, Vidyadhar Vyas, Suresh Wadkar, Jyotsna Bhole, Padma Talwalkar, Shruti Sadolikar, Satyasheel Deshpande, Asha Khadilkar, Upendra Bhat, Shubha Mudgal, Vijay Koparkar, Arati Ankalikar-Tikekar, Veena Sahasrabuddhe, Rahul Deshpande; and played lehra to accompany Tabla Solo by Alla Rakha, with Vocal and Mridangam by T. V. Gopalakrishnan.

He performed in United States and Europe, including a concert in Maharashtra Mandal of London, to support the fund for the victims of 1993 Latur earthquake; and in the convention of Brihan Maharashtra Mandal of North America at Houston, USA. He composed Music for Marathi musical theatre, for dramas including Sanyastha Jwalamukhi based on the life of Swami Vivekananda, and Dnyanoba Maza based on the life of Saint Dnyaneshwar.

Oke; the playwrighter, songwriter and music director of the Sangeet Natak Tajmahal, became the second person in musical theatre in Marathi language after 138 years as the same feat was done first by Annasaheb Kirloskar in 1882 for Sangeet Saubhadra. Sangeet Tajmahal was judged as the best drama in the 59th Maharashtra state sangeet natak competition (2020) and Oke was adjudged as the best playwright and music director. Oke brought to surface the existence of a temple in Mansingh's palace which was taken over by Shahjahan to be the queen's grave, in his own words.

== 22 Shruti Research ==
Oke's research on shrutis in the Indian classical music is insightful and potentially revolutionary. Shrutis are the 22 basic musical notes (microtones) which create a Raga. Oke discovered that the sequential progression of the notes can be plotted mathematically, enabling playing them on a string, precisely. Based on a twenty-two shruti system the former physician patented the world's first, unique, patented unique harmonium which can also double up as an Accordion, as he entered the list of Indians who created their own musical instruments. Oke gave lec-dems on his research on shrutis at several locations including a TED-X talk at IIT Gandhinagar.

When compared with the primordial model of Bharata Muni, Oke’s research was found most convincing as it has the highest mathematical sophistication and accuracy, along with an amalgamation of principles of Indian music laid by great scholars of Indian music such as Bharata himself. The approval of great artists and musical instruments applying his model directly into the practice is a profound positive in his favor.

== Author ==
1. 11 Upanishade aani Vidyadharopanishad (Marathi) (Marathi Edition) - 10 December 2024
2. Shriram Kundali (based on modern research) (Marathi Edition) - 22 January 2024
3. 99% Match: The Periodic Table and 22 Shrutis of Indian Classical Music : Unveiling the universal code of creation and music - 2023
4. Taj Mahal: An unbelievable discovery, 2nd Edition – 2023.
5. Bhagvad Geeta (Marathi) - 2022.
6. Punarjanma : Mithya Kee Tathya (Marathi), Parama Mitra Publications – 2018.
7. 22 Shrutis (Hindi), Sanskar Prakashan - 2015.
8. Shrutividnyan Va Ragasoundarya, Rajhansa Prakashan - 2015
9. Taj Mahal, (A Music Drama approved by Maharashtra Rajya Prayog Parinirikshan Mandal or Sensor Board for Dramas, Maharashtra State) – 2014.
10. Shrutigeeta, Madhav Rafter Publications – 2011.
11. 22 Shrutis, (Marathi), Sanskar Prakashan - 2010.
12. 22 Shrutis, (English), Sanskar Prakashan - 2007.
13. Govind Gunadarshan, (A life sketch of Govindrao Patwardhan), Bhagyashree Publications – 2006.
14. Manoranjak Swabhavashastra, (An Astrological treatise on the Chinese zodiac), Udveli Books −2002.
15. Mitra Jivacha', (An Astrological treatise on the Chinese system of I Ching) Kasturika Communications -1996.

== Astrologer ==
A student of Late Pandita Leelatai Paranjpe, Oke has studied Hindu astrology, Chinese astrology, and Western astrology for 50 years. He is a great proponent of Grant Lewi, considered as the father of modern astrology in America. Lewi's Philosophy of Life is that Destiny, when multiplied by Free will, creates human life, which normally appears as a constant struggle between what is existence and what essence) ought to be. Knowledge about horoscope gives a glimpse into destiny and allows for prospective planning of Free will (alternatives and choices) to create the best possible conditions of Human Life. Oke has written newspaper articles and authored books including one on the 12 signs of the Chinese Zodiac and another on the I Ching or the ancient Chinese divination text. He has given invited lectures, besides presenting a daily Astrology programme on ETV Network, Mumbai.

The incorporeal essence of a living being called the soul exists as consciousness before birth and even before conception – a first fundamental fact of reincarnation. Oke has authored a book proposing examples of reincarnation of prominent Indian personalities including Narendra Modi, Manmohan Singh, Swami Ramdev, Mohan Bhagwat, Medha Patkar, Vishwanathan Anand, Sonu Nigam, A. R. Rahman, Rashid Khan, Shivkumar Sharma, Ajoy Chakrabarty, Shahid Parvez, Rajan Mishra, Kishori Amonkar, Alla Rakha, Vishnu Digambar Paluskar, Dadasaheb Phalke, D. V. Paluskar, Anokhelal Mishra, Vasantrao Deshpande and Bal Gandharva.

== Awards ==
1. Best Drama, Best Playwright and Best Music Director for 'Sangeet Tajmahal' (59th Maharashtra state sangeet natak competition, 2020)
2. Pancharatna Puraskar (Harmony Foundation)
3. Vitthalrao Korgaonkar Puraskar (Surel Samvadini Samvardhan, Belgaum)
4. Maharashtra Granthottejak Sanstha (Pune)
5. P.L.Deshpande Award (Uttung Sanskrutik Pariwar, Mumbai)
6. Bandubhaiyya Chougule Puraskar (Indore)
7. Appasaheb Jalgaokar Puraskar (Ganavardhan, Pune)
8. Keshavrao Bhosale Award by Govt. of Maharashtra
9. Thane Bhushan Award (Thane Municipal Corporation)
10. Thane Nagar Ratna Award (Nagar Vikas Manch)
11. Thane Manabindu Award (Maharashtra Times-Indradhanu)
12. Anil Mohile Award (Siddhakala Academy)
13. Vinayak Damodar Savarkar Award (Savarkar Nyasa)
14. Dr. Sharadini Dahanukar Hirvai Sanman (King Edward Memorial Hospital and Seth Gordhandas Sunderdas Medical College|King Edward Memorial Hospital)
15. Swara-Kranti Award (Nadabrahma)
16. Sahavadak Puraskar (Swarabandh, Mumbai)
17. Surmani (Sur Singar Samsad)
18. Leadership through Innovation Award (Wockhardt)
19. Best Music Director (Drama), Dnyanoba Majha, (Maharashtra Times Sanman)
20. Best Music Director (Drama), Sanyasta Jwalamukhi, (Zee TV Nomination)
21. Ashtapailu Puraskar, (Chitpavan Brahmin Sangh, Thane)
22. Shraddhanand Puraskar, (Brahmin Sabha, Mumbai)
23. Pune Marathi Granthalaya Puraskar (Pune)
24. Akhil Bharatiya Marathi Prakashak Sangh Puraskar

== Personal life ==
Vidyadhar Oke is married to Bhagyashree Oke. She is a Kathak Dancer. They have three sons, Anand, Amod and Aditya Oke. Aditya is also a harmonium player. His daughter-in-law Vedashree Oke is a stage actress and a singer.
