= Suresh Bhat =

Marathi poet (1932–2003)

- Born: 15 April 1932; Amravati, Maharashtra, India
- Died: 14 March 2003 (aged 70); Nagpur, Maharashtra, India
- Occupations: Poet, lyricist

Suresh Bhat (15 April 1932 – 14 March 2003) was a Marathi poet from the state of Maharashtra, India.

== Life ==
Bhat was born into a Karhade Brahmin family in Amravati, Maharashtra. His mother was fond of poetry and often made young Bhat read famous Marathi poems. This was a key influence in the development of his own poetry. He earned a B.A. degree in 1955.

After completing his education he took teaching jobs in rural areas of Amravati and continued writing poems.

In 1964, he married Pushpa Mehendale, who came from Pune but worked as teacher in Madhan, Amravati.

He converted to Buddhism in the presence of Bhante Surai Sasai and Bhau Lokhande. B. R. Ambedkar was an ideal to him. According to his son, Bhat was an atheist.

Bhat died of cardiac arrest on 14 March 2003, at the aged of 70. He is survived by his son, Chittranjan Bhat, and daughter.

== Works ==
Bhat published his first collection of poems, Roopgandha in 1961. In 1974, he published his second collection, Ranga maazhaa wegalaa, and in 1983 he self-published a collection named Elgaar. Other collections of his poems include Zanjhaavaat and Saptaranga.

Roopgandha and Ranga maazhaa wegalaa were the recipients of the state literary awards sponsored by the Government of Maharashtra in their respective years of publication.

Poet Pradeep Niphadkar and ghazal writer Ilahi Jamadar were his students in Pune.

His song on B. R. Ambedkar, "Bhimraya Ghe Tuzya Ya Lekranchi Vandana" (Father Ambedkar, take these offerings from your children) was popular in the Dalit and Ambedkarist communities in Maharashtra.

Bhat's poems are generally classified as Marathi ghazals.

Bhat's best-known verses gained popularity after they were set to music by Hridaynath Mangeshkar, and were sung by Lata Mangeshkar and Asha Bhosle.

Bhat's poem 'Maayboli' was composed by music director Kaushal Inamdar as "Marathi Abhimaangeet", featuring more than 450 singers.

=== List of poetry collections ===
- Roopgandha
- Ranga maazhaa vegalaa
- Elgaar
- Zanjhaavaat
- Saptaranga
- Rasvanticha Mujara
- Kaflaa
