= Ajintha =

Ajintha may refer to:

- Ajintha (film), a 2012 Marathi film
- Ajintha caves, also known as Ajanta Caves near Aurangabad
