= Vedashree Oke =

Vedashree Khadilkar Oke
- Born: Vedashree Khadilkar; 10 October 1980 (age 45)
- Occupation: Singer
- Instruments: Actress, Singer
- Years active: 2000–present

Vedashree Oke is an Indian actress and playback singer in the Marathi film industry. She has sung in Marathi. She was a part of musical program Sa Re Ga Ma Pa in the year 1997.

== Childhood and Education ==
Vedashree is from a musical family and her father Madhav Khadilkar and mother Asha Khadilkar are also well known Marathi singers. She has an MA in music with a gold medal.

== Career ==
She was a part of Sangeet Natak (Musical Drama) Kaviraj Jaidev which was the winning drama in Rajya Natya Spardha in Sangli, Maharashtra. She has performed in Katyar Kaljat Ghusli which is a musical play directed by Subodh Bhave. The play was supported by renowned theatre and musical artists among which were Rahul Deshpande, Mahesh Kale, Subodh Bhave, Dipti Mate and many more. She played a vital part in the play "Naman Natavara" on a regional television channel ETV Marathi. Acted is Marathi movie Pushapak Viman directed by Vaibhav Chinchalkar with the cast Subodh Bhave, Mohan Agashe.

She was signed as a playback singer for the blockbuster movie series Timepass 2 which was directed by Ravi Jadhav. She has been working in Smt. Sulochanadevi Singhania School, Thane as a Music Teacher in the cultural faculty since 2011. She is the director of 'Asha khadilkar academy of performing arts'.

== Playback singer ==
- Timepass
- Timepass 2

Serials Agnihitra 2 Title song Swarajyarakshak sambhaji Ovi

== Awards ==
- 'Navadurga Puraskar' for outstanding work in Music and acting by Anand charitable trust

== Personal Details ==
Her husband Aditya Oke and father-in-law Vidyadhar Oke play the harmonium, while her mother-in-law Bhagyashree Oke is a kathak dancer. Her mother Asha Khadilkar performs Indian (Hindustani) classical, semi-classical and devotional music including Natya Sangeet. Her father is a graduate of NSD (National School Of Drama) New Delhi and has directed a drama called "Anadi Me Anant Me" which is based on the life of Vinayak Damodar Savarkar.
