= Rani Varma =

Indian singer

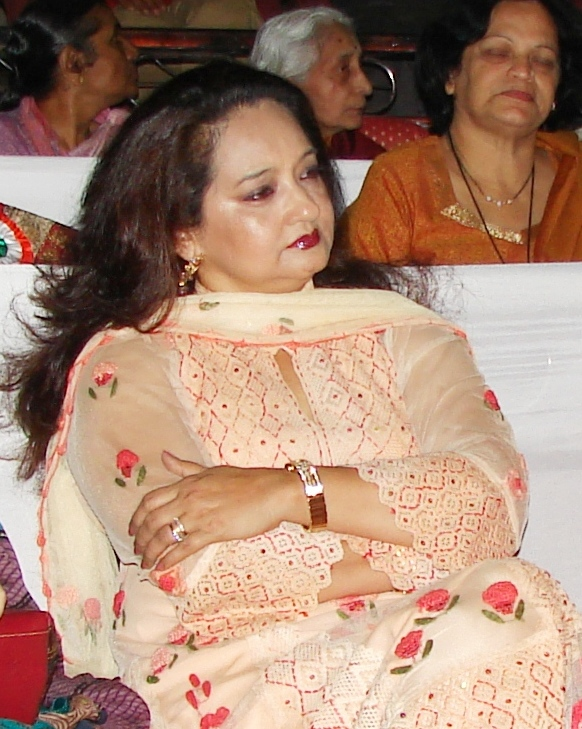
- Born: Rani Varma; 7 May 1956 (age 70); Mumbai, Maharashtra, India
- Occupations: Musician Singer: Singer; Recordist; Film Producer
- Years active: present
- Relatives: Amar Varma (Father); Manik Varma (Mother); Aruna Jaiprakash (Sister); Bharati Achrekar (Sister); Vandana Gupte (Sister)

Rani Varma is a singer and recordist. She has also sung many songs as a playback singer. She is a daughter of Amar Varma, the famous Hindi/Urdu writer, poet, director & produce & well-known singer Manik Varma.

== Early life ==
Rani was born in the family of Amar Varma, the famous Hindi/Urdu writer, poet, director & producer and Padma Shri winner Manik Varma the doyen of Indian Classical music of Kirana Gharana, who also excelled in semi-classical and light music like Thumrari, Natyasangeet, Bhajans and Bhavgeets and became a household name in Maharashtra. She started taking Indian classical music lessons from Pandit Vasantrao Kulkarni from the childhood on her mother's insistence to have a regular and systematic knowledge, base and depth in music. Looking to her talent and potential, the famous music director of Indian Motion pictures Shri. C. Ramchandra gave her the first opportunity of singing in his concert,"Geet Gopal" as a solo singer at the age of nine. At 12, her first playback song "Pappa Saanga Kunache" and "He Rashtra Devatanche" for Marathi film Gharkul became hits, where she became known for her sweet voice and confidence and from then she was lovingly and affectionately called as "Rani Varma". She continued singing with him for his live concerts "Bhulaye Na Bane" and became the wonder child singer.

== Career ==
Rani made her playback debut in Ga Geet Tu Satari, in Marathi. She has sung many Marathi songs. She has done many albums for children including famous "Adam Tadam Tad Tad Baja". Rani also owns a recording studio Saptak in Mumbai.

She was a part of project done by Ashok Hande on Manik Varma named "Manik Moti" with support by Bharati Achrekar and Vandana Gupte after Manik Varma's death.

== Popular Songs ==
- गा गीत तू सतारी Ga Geet Tu Satari
- जगणे अमुचे नका विचारू Jagane Amuche Naka Vicharu
- तुला आळवीता जीवन Tula Aalavita Jeevan Sarave
- तू सुखकर्ता तू दुःखहर्ता Tu Sukhakarta Tu
- पप्पा सांगा कुणाचे Pappa Sanga Kunache
- मी मोठ्ठा होनार किनई Mi Mottha Honar Kinai
- संपले स्वप्‍न ते Sampale Swapna Te
- हे राष्ट्र देवतांचे He Rashtra Devatanche

== Albums ==
- Adam Tadam Tad Tad Baja

== Personal life ==
Varma is a youngest daughter of Manik Varma. She has sisters, Aruna Jaiprakash, Bharati Achrekar, an actor and Vandana Gupte, a Marathi stage, film and television actor. Rani Varma was first married to Shashank Lalchand who had acted in a few films in 1970s. She has narrated in a talk that after Lalchand's untimely death in 1991, she managed his studio in Mumbai for next 10 years before closing it down. Her second marriage was to a Professional Engineer and hospitality investor Ashok Patel, based in New Orleans in USA; they divorced in 2005, and Rani Varma returned to India.
