= Ajintha (film) =

- Film poster
- Directed by: Nitin Chandrakant Desai
- Screenplay by: Nitin Desai; Mandar Joshi
- Story by: Nitin Desai
- Produced by: Neha Nitin Desai; Meena Chandrakant Desai
- Starring: Sonalee Kulkarni; Phillip Scott Wallace; Manoj Kolhatkar; Makarand Deshpande; Avinash Narkar
- Cinematography: Rajeev Jain
- Edited by: Prashant Khedekar
- Music by: Kaushal Inamdar
- Release date: 11 May 2012
- Running time: 135 minutes
- Country: India
- Language: Marathi

Ajintha (Marathi: अजिंठा) is a Marathi movie directed by Nitin Chandrakant Desai. It narrates a love story between a Marathi Buddhist tribal Paro (Sonalee Kulkarni) and British Major Robert Gill (Wallace), an artist, while he visited India to paint historical monuments and scriptures. It also showcases the historic Ajanta caves and the beautiful scriptures on the walls of the caves depicting the ancient Buddhist culture.

== Cast ==
- Sonalee Kulkarni: Paro
- Philip Scott Wallace: Major Robert Gill
- Manoj Kolhatkar: Jalal-Ud-Ddin
- Avinash Narkar: Pandit
- Jan Bostock: Capt. James Smith
- Reena Aggarwal: Kamala
- Murali Sharma: Mukhiya
- Makarand Deshpande: Daulatya
- Manoj Joshi: Nizam
- S.N. Patil: Dhanaji

== Soundtrack ==
Background score and the music to the tracks is given by Kaushal Inamdar, and lyrics are written by Marathi author and poet N. D. Mahanor.

=== Track list ===
Following is the track list:

Track #	Song	Artist
1	"Dolyana Dasale Pahad"	Kaushal Inamdar
2	"Chimb Jhali"	Milind Ingle & Voiceover by Vinay Apte
3	"Man Chimb Pavsali"	Hamsika Iyer
4	"Chaityancha Rang"	Priyanka Barve, Aanandi Joshi
5	"Shabdat Gothale Dukha"	Suresh Wadkar
6	"Hori ka Tyohar"	Avdhoot Gupte
7	"Baglya Baglya Phoola De"	Tejashwini Kelkar
8	"Saran Jaltana"	Pt. Satyasheel Deshpande
9	"Lal Hori Crescendo"	Swanand Kirkire
