= Kareena Kareena =

- Directed by: Habib Faisal
- Starring: see below
- Opening theme: "Kareena Kareena" by Sunidhi Chauhan
- Country of origin: India
- No. of seasons: 1
- No. of episodes: 206

Production
- Running time: approx. 22 minutes

Original release
- Network: Zee TV
- Release: 18 October 2004 – 17 October 2005

Kareena Kareena is a Zee TV comedy serial that aired from 18 October 2004 to 17 October 2005. Numerous celebrities have also made appearances on the show such as Amol Palekar, Abhishek Bachchan, Shahrukh Khan, Priyanka Chopra, and Rajeev Khandelwal. A spin off Pandey aur Pandey aired in 2006. The show was replaced by Saat Phere: Saloni Ka Safar Reruns of the show aired on Zee Smile and Zee Anmol.

== Cast ==
- Kulraj Randhawa as Kareena/Mrs. Sood
- Nandita Puri as Kareena's Mother
- Sandeep Rajora as Tushar Pandey
- Sharokh Barocha as Prem Motwani
- Sudhir Pandey as Tribhuvandas Pandey
- Vandana Gupte as Nilambari Tribhuvandas Pandey
- Atul Srivastava as P.K. Srivastav
- Manmeet Singh as Kareena's landlord
- Neeru Bajwa as Lolo
- Karanveer Singh as Kareena's Boyfriend
- Manisha Kanojia as Lolo's Mother
- Anju Rajeev
- Faraaz Khan
