= Raveendra Nee Evide? =

2025 Malayalam-language comedy thriller film

- Theatrical release poster
- Directed by: Manoj Palodan
- Written by: Krishna Poojappura
- Produced by: Abraham Mathew
- Starring: Anoop Menon; Dhyan Sreenivasan; Siddique; Sheelu Abraham; Azees Nedumangad
- Cinematography: Mahadevan Thampi
- Edited by: Zian Sreekanth
- Music by: Prakash Ulliyeri
- Production company: Abaam Movies
- Release date: 18 July 2025
- Running time: 103 minutes
- Country: India
- Language: Malayalam

Raveendra Nee Evide? (English: Raveendran, Where Are You?) is a 2025 Indian Malayalam language comedy thriller film, directed by Manoj Palodan and written by Krishna Poojappura. The film is produced by Abraham Mathew under the Abaam Movies banner and features a star cast including Anoop Menon, Dhyan Sreenivasan, Siddique, Sheelu Abraham, Azees Nedumangad, Senthil Krishna, and Major Ravi.

== Plot ==
Raveendran, a meticulous senior scientist at the Meteorological Centre, leads a structured life alongside his wife Bindhu and their daughter. His world is thrown into disarray when odd occurrences involving neighbour John spark suspicion about his wife's fidelity. Soon, a chain of misunderstandings leads to a kidnapping, police involvement, and escalating chaos. Raveendran struggles to unravel the confusion and restore order before it all comes crashing down.

== Cast ==
- Anoop Menon as Raveendran
- Dhyan Sreenivasan as Johnkutty
- Siddique as Chovva George
- Sheelu Abraham as Bindhu
- Azees Nedumangad as Balan
- Senthil Krishna as Preman
- Major Ravi as CI Mohammed Rafi
- Suresh Krishna as Poulose Padaveedan
- Sajin Cherukayil as Bindhu's Brother Bhadran

== Production ==
The film was produced by Abraham Mathew under the Abaam Movies banner. It marks a collaboration between writer Krishna Poojappura and director Manoj Palodan. Cinematography was handled by Mahadevan Thampi, with editing by Zian Sreekanth. The film was earlier titled as Ideem Minnalum but later changed to the current title.

== Music ==
The soundtrack and score were composed by Prakash Ulliyeri. The first single "Mazha Mazha", sung by Shankar Mahadevan and penned by B K Harinarayanan, was released ahead of the film’s premiere.

== Release ==
The film released in theatres on 18 July 2025.

== Reception ==
=== Critical response ===
The film received mixed to negative reviews. The Indian Express criticized it as "another cinematic catastrophe," awarding it just 1/5 stars, while acknowledging the music by Prakash Ulliyeri as the only notable positive. A review by Asianet News described the film as a "small family-humour movie" appreciating the light-hearted moments and individual performances, especially noting that Azees Nedumangad shared engaging scenes with Anoop Menon.
