= Padmavati Gokhale Shaligram =

Hindustani vocalist

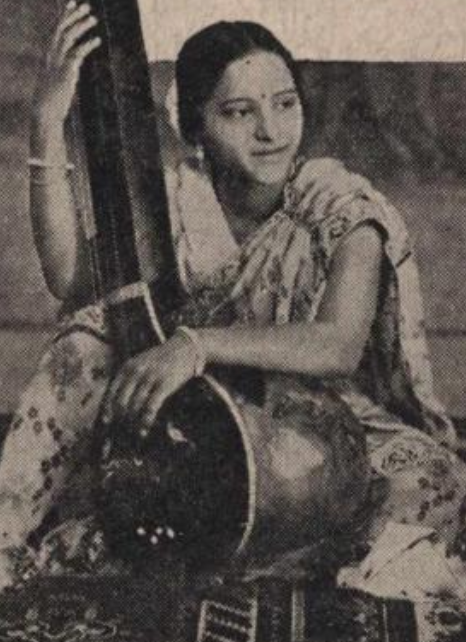
- Padmavati Shaligram, from the cover of a 1937 issue of The Indian Listener
- Born: 1918; Kolhapur
- Died: 20 July 2014 (aged 95–96); Mumbai
- Occupations: Musician, singer

Padmavati Shaligram Gokhale (1918 – 20 July 2014) was a Hindustani music vocalist, instrumentalist, and music educator.

Padmavati Shaligram was born in Kolhapur, Maharashtra. She started learning vocal music from her uncle Govind-buwa Shaligram. Under her married name Padmavati Gokhale, she performed all over Hindustan (India and Pakistan) before the partition of India. Her gayaki had the traditional elements of the Jaipur-Atrauli gharana with the swar–lagav which was influenced by the Kirana gharana. Padmavatitai was also a teacher and trained numerous disciples, including Kedar Naphade, Shubhada Paradkar, Sunita Tikare, Anita Sundararajan, and Geeta Javdekar. Her gayaki was distinctivly in Alladiya Khan's style.

ITC SRA rediscovered Padmavati Shaligram for the Kolkata audience after decades, on the platinum jubilee year of her singing career in November 2005. She received "Sangeet Natak Academy Award" in 1988 by Govt. of India. she is also the recipient of, Kalidas Samman in 1994–95, Award from Akhil Bharatiya Gandharva Mahavidyalaya Mandal. Padmavati Shaligram Gokhale presented two compositions set to Teentaal in Shuddha Sarang without using Madhyams.

Gokhale contributed to the acceptance and respect of Thumri. She died at the age of 96 on 20 July 2014 in Mumbai.
