= Satyajit Prabhu =

Satyajit Prabhu(sattu)
- Born: Satyajit
- Genres: Hindustani classical music
- Occupation: Synthesizer Player
- Instrument: Synthesizer
- Years active: Since 1994

Satyajit Prabhu is an Indian harmonium, synthesizer and keyboard player. He is a music arranger, composer who plays several instruments. He plays piano, accordion, trumpet, etc. on his keyboard for popular Bollywood classics. He is popularly known as Sattu.

== Career ==
Satyajit played the keyboards in all the programs of Ashok Hande. He was a part of Zee Marathi channel musical program SAREGAMAPA and was leading music arrangement. Sattu has made several performances during his career and contributed as synthesizer player in many musical programs. He along with Aditya Oke have started an independent program on harmonium as "Jaduchi Peti" (जादूची पेटी) where he explains the history of harmonium and motivates people to lo learn harmonium.

== Programs and stage shows ==
1. "Jaduchi Peti" (जादूची पेटी) with Aditya Oke
2. Zee Marathi SAREGAMA
