= Ashok Hande =

- Birth name: Ashok Kisanrao Hande
- Born: Umbraj, Pune, India
- Occupation(s): Stage director, writer, actor, singer, producer of musical shows
- Instrument: Vocals
- Years active: 1990–present

Ashok Kisanrao Hande is an Indian stage director, writer, actor, singer, producer of musical shows and TV personality based in Mumbai.

== Early life ==
Hande was born in the village of Umbraj in Pune in a family of Varkari. From childhood he had a liking for Bhajan, Bharud, Ovya, Tamasha etc. Later, his family moved to Mumbai and Hande grew up in Rangari Badak Chawl in Lalbaug, which had 16 buildings and 10,000 residents.

Many cultural activities took place there including dombari khel (street acrobats), bhaloo naach (bear dance), powadas (short performances about patriotic leaders and historical figures), lezim (a drill routine with cymbals), kirtans (songs from religion and mythology) and political speeches. Hande participated in competitions during the Ganapati festival. He saw Vasudev (a dervish announcing the arrival of dawn) visiting homes in early morning, people going for khandoba jaagar (staying up through the night in devotion of Lord Khandoba) which helped him to learn folk music. In college, as part of the NSS (National Social Service) group, Hande walked over 100 km through the tribal areas of Vangani where he learned their music. In school days, he was actively involved in local Ganesh Utsav, Navratri Utsav, Kho-kho and other sports and cultural activities. While in school, he participated in drama competitions through the Chikitsak group. During college days in Ruparel college, he appeared in one-act plays, singing competitions, etc. Hande learned music from kirtankars Sonopant Dandekar, Nijampurkar Baba to Shahir Sable, Amar Sheikh and Balakram Worlikar Kalapathak.

== Career ==
Hande formed a musical group ‘’Chaurang’’ on 7 August 1987. Chaurang promoted the heritage of Indian culture and tradition; mainly music and dance. Hande started a medley of Marathi folk and film songs through “Mangal gaani dangal gaani”. This show became popular and toured London and other locations. He made over 1800 performances. Overall, Chaurang crossed a landmark of 6000 shows and travelled to more than 15 states of India as well as countries including the UK, the US, Canada, Belgium, Netherlands and the UAE. His narration was unique and everybody was applauded for its innovative and different performing style.

Later, Hande performed nine musical shows - Manik Moti (based on Marathi singer Manik Varma's life and music), Ganga Jamuna (based on Marathi music director P Savlaram's compositions), Amrut Lata (75 of Lata Mangeshkar's hand-picked songs), Madhurbala (biography of the beautiful actress Madhubala through her songs), Awaz Ki Duniya (based on Bollywood classic songs), Mangal Gaani Dangal Gaani (a cocktail of Marathi songs), Gaane Suhane (all-time hit Hindi songs), Azaadi 60 (commemorating Indian history and 60 years of its independence) Marathi Baana, a cultural extravaganza of Maharashtra that includes bhajan to lavani and from adivasi dances to Ganesh aarti.

In 2005, Hande introduced Marathi Baana. The first performance was staged at Dinanath Natyagruha in Vile Parle on November 1, 2005. The show included farmers' lives, tribals' stories, bhakti sangeet (devotional music), tamasha-lavani (folk dance), celebration of festivals, koli dance (popular folk dance by the Kolis- the fisher folk of Maharastra), burgunda (common sense passed on orally from one generation to the next), as well as ritual festivities like mangalagaur (games women play), gondhal (folk ritual) and jogwa (dedicated tribe of devotees - jogta/ jogtin who ask for alms).

Hande directed Manik Moti with the support of Varma's daughters, Bharti Achrekar, Vandana Gupte and Rani Varma after her death. Bhakti Barve was the announcer and also helped with the research. On Lata Mangeshkar's 75th birthday, Hande paid tribute to her by showcasing her best 75 songs out of some 5000 through Amrut Lata. Hande formed a show based on Yashwantrao Chavan's life and achievements named Mee Yashwant. Hande also made a show on Madhubala's life.

== Selected projects ==
=== Writer and director ===
Mangal gaani Dangal gaani, Aawaz ki Duniya, Aazadi 50, Gaane Suhane, Manikmoti, Aapli awad, Manchahe geet, Swagat 2000, Amrutlata, I Love India, Ganga Jamuna, Anandyatri, Marathi Bana, Adaranjali, Madhurbala, Suvarna Maharashtra, Me Yashwant, Ateet ki naav par, Atre, atre, sarvatre.

=== Singer ===
He appeared in more than 7,500 stage shows He worked as a playback singer in Marathi movies and serials such as Hamaal de Dhamal, Shame to Shame, Janta Janardan, Jeevsakha and Rangberangi. He sang jingles in many languages, including Mangal gaani Dangal gaani and Awaaz ki Duniya.

=== Music director ===
He directed plays and one-acts, audio cassettes, jingles, programs on Doordarshan. He hosted the Maharashtra state government Chitra-rath on 26 January 1994 republic day parade (topic Mango).

=== Compering ===
He was the comper for shows including Mangal gaani, Dangal gaani, Awaaz ki Duniya, Azaadi 50, Gaane Suhane, Marathi Bana.

He was a judge in reality shows: Star Pravah and Nach Baliye.

== Music programmes ==
- Aawaj ki duniya
- Marathi Baana
- Manik Moti
- Ganga Jamuna
- Amrut Lata
- Madhubala
- Mangal Gaani Dangal Gaani
- Gaane Suhane
- Azaadi 60

== Awards ==
- ‘Vasant Desai Puraskar’
- ' Lokmat Maharastrian of the Year 2017' in Performing Arts Section
