= Vandana Gupte =

Indian actress

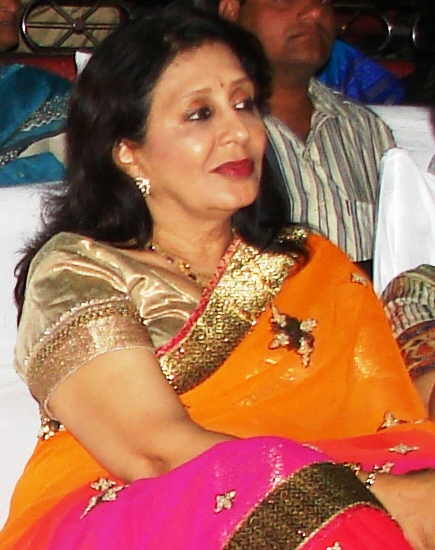
- Vandana Gupte
- Born: Vandana Varma; 16 July 1952 (age 74); Bombay, Maharashtra
- Occupations: Actress, Producer
- Spouse: Shirish Gupte (m. 1973)
- Mother: Manik Varma
- Relatives: Bharati Achrekar; Rani Varma (sisters)

Vandana Gupte (born 16 July 1952) is an Indian actress known for her work in Marathi stage productions along with television and film productions.

== Career ==
Her most well-known TV role was as the domineering Nilambari Pandey in Zee TV's comedy serial Kareena Kareena.

She was a part of project done by Ashok Hande on Manik Varma named Manik Moti with support by Rani Varma and Bharti Achrekar after Manik Varma's death.

== Personal life ==
Vandana is the daughter of noted classical singer Manik Varma and Shri Amar Varma, and sister of Bharati Achrekar and Rani Varma. She is married to criminal defence lawyer Shirish Gupte.

== Filmography ==
=== Films ===
| Year | Film | Role | Notes |
|---|---|---|---|
| 1989 | Pasant Aahe Mulgi | Sushanta | Debut |
| 1990 | Tujhi Majhi Jamli Jodi | Jyotsana | |
| 1992 | Soona Ani Mona | Mona | |
| 1993 | Lapandav | Adv. Asavari Samarth | |
| 2002 | Bhet | | |
| 2003 | Not Only Mrs. Raut | Judge | |
| 2004 | Pachhadlela | Durga | |
| 2006 | Divasen Divas | Vandu | |
| 2006 | Matichya Chuli | Sunanda Dandekar | |
| 2007 | It's Breaking News | Mrs. Dandekar | Hindi |
| 2007 | The Other End of the Line | Megha Bhatia | Hindi |
| 2007 | Ghartyasathi Sar Kahi | | |
| 2008 | Meerabai Not Out | Mrs. Achrekar | Hindi |
| 2008 | Baap Re Baap Dokyala Taap | Mrs. Kadu Patil | |
| 2008 | Sawar Re | | |
| 2008 | Samaantar | Jyotsna Saxena | |
| 2008 | Be Dune Sade Char | Manorama | |
| 2010 | Mani Mangalsutra | Joshi Kaku | |
| 2013 | Time Please | Mandodari Kulkarni | |
| 2013 | Dhating Dhingana | Gauri 's mother | |
| 2013 | We Are On! Houn Jau Dya | Mrs. Ponkshe | |
| 2013 | Dhaam Dhoom | | |
| 2014 | Aandhali Koshimbir | Shanti Chitnis | |
| 2015 | Murder Mestri | Malini Mestri | |
| 2015 | Double Seat | Amit 's mother | |
| 2016 | Photocopy | Aaji | |
| 2016 | Family Katta | Malti Sabnis | |
| 2018 | Barayan | Raja Aatya | |
| 2018 | Whats Up Lagna | Revati | |
| 2018 | Bucket List | Sudha Sane | |
| 2019 | 66 Sadashiv | Mrs. Shrikhande | |
| 2019 | Anntar | | |
| 2021 | A Trial Before Monsoon | Neetu Deshmukh | |
| 2021 | Well Done Baby | Nirmala | |
| 2021 | Karkhanisanchi Waari | Indira Karkhanis | |
| 2022 | Dil Dimaag Aur Batti | Devaki Akka Chaudhary | |
| 2023 | Baipan Bhari Deva | Shashi | |
| 2025 | Ashi Hi Jamva Jamvi | Vandana Acharya | |

=== Television ===
- x Zone (1998) Hindi Zee TV
- Kareena Kareena (2004–2005) Hindi Zee TV
- Pandey aur Pandey (2006) Hindi Bollywood Songs Countdown Show Zee TV
- Hya Gojirvanya Gharat ETV Marathi
- Bandhan Saat Janamon Ka (2008–2009) Hindi Colors TV
- Sajan Re Jhoot Mat Bolo Hindi SAB TV
- Aambat Goad Star Pravah
- Sukhachya Sarini He Man Baware Colors Marathi

=== Theatre ===
- Shoo...Kutha Bolaycha Nahi
- Shree Tashi Sau
- Celebration
- Sundar Mi Honar
- Ramale Mee - Chandralekha
- Chaar Chaughi - Shri Chintamani
- Ranga Umaltya Manache - Chandralekha
- Padmashree Dhundiraj
- Akhercha Sawaal - with Vijaya Mehta
- Madanbaadhaa -
- Sonchapha - Chandralekha
- Gaganbhedi - Chandralekha
- Sundar Mi Honar - by P.L. Deshpande
- Wada Chirebandi -
- Jhunja -
- Premaa Tujhya Gava Zaave - Chandralekha
- Saatvya Muleechee Saatvee Mulgee -
- Ani Kahi Olee Paane -
- Char Diwas Premache - by Ratnakar Matkari
- Char Din Pyaar Ke - Hindi by Ratnakar Matkari
- Jasma Odhun -
- Sandhyachaya -
- Haravlelya Pattyancha Banglaa - Chandrakant Kulkarni
- Kutumb Kirrrtan
