= Sa Re Ga Ma Pa Marathi Li'l Champs =

Indian reality TV show (2008-2023)

- Created by: Zee Marathi Creative Team
- Directed by: Rajan Dange
- Presented by: Pallavi Joshi; Mrunmayee Deshpande
- Judges: Avdhoot Gupte; Vaishali Samant; Salil Kulkarni; Suresh Wadkar; Vaishali Mhade
- Theme music composer: Ajay–Atul
- Country of origin: India
- Original language: Marathi
- No. of seasons: 4
- No. of episodes: 249

Production
- Executive producer: Nilesh Mayekar Sandeep Arjun Kamble
- Production locations: Mumbai, Maharashtra, India
- Camera setup: Multi-camera
- Running time: 45–60 minutes

Original release
- Network: Zee Marathi
- Release: 7 July 2008 – 25 November 2023

Related
- Sa Re Ga Ma Pa Marathi

Sa Re Ga Ma Pa Marathi Li'l Champs is an Indian Marathi language singing reality show which is a part of Sa Re Ga Ma Pa Marathi which aired on Zee Marathi. Li'l Champs first season premiered in 2008. The winner of the first season was Kartiki Gaikwad. There were three more seasons, the latest one being the 4th season broadcast in 2023.

== Production ==
The show aimed to discover the best singing talent in the age range of 5–15 years from the Maharashtra. The show was judged by singer and composer Avadhoot Gupte and singer Vaishali Samant in addition to other individuals from the Indian music industry who served as guest judges. The show was hosted by actress Pallavi Joshi. The progress of the contestants through the rounds was also dependent on the votes of the audience.

=== Auditions ===
Auditions for the show up to season 13 were held in Pune, Nashik, Aurangabad, Nagpur, Thane, Kolhapur and Mumbai. For season 14, channel arranged auditions through WhatsApp by making some short video of songs. The auditions were conducted by music composer Kaushal S. Inamdar.

=== Finalist ===
The top 5 Little Champs Season 1 Finalists are

- Rohit Raut
- Prathamesh Laghate
- Aarya Ambekar
- Mugdha Vaishampayan
- Kartiki Gaikwad

These Top 5 Finalist were invited in the show Chala Hawa Yeu Dya on Zee Marathi from 8–10 February 2021 for completing 12 years of Sa Re Ga Ma Pa Li'l Champs Finale.

=== Rules ===
The contest was held in five stages viz. Preliminary, Quarter-Final, Semi-Final, Final and Mega-Final. One contestant was declared the "Little Champ" from these five stages.

A total of 50 contestants were divided across two groups. The first group, "Juniors", had 20 contestants in the age range of 8 to 11 years while the second group had 30 contestants in the age range of 12 to 14 years. The contestants in the 8 to 11 years age group performed on the episodes broadcast on Mondays while the contestants from the 12 to 14 years age group performed on the episodes broadcast on Tuesdays.

=== Scoring system ===
In this contest the notes Sa Re Ga Ma Pa Dha Ni was used for scoring. After every performance of every contestant, every judge independently scored the performance.

The scores increased linearly from 'Sa' to 'Ni' and will have values from 'Sa' = 1 to 'Ni' = 7. The result was declared based on the total score from the judges. In the Final round, the same scoring system will be used to make decisions. The values for the notes will change to 'Sa' = 14, 'Re' = 28, 'Ga' = 42, 'Ma' = 56, 'Pa'= 70, 'Dha' = 85 and 'Ni' = 100. 'Sa+' = 100+

In the Final round, while making a decision the votes of the viewers was taken into account along with the scores given by the judges. Till the middle of the Final round the weighting given to the votes of the viewers increased while that given to the scores of the judges decreased.

In the first week of the Final round, all the contestants performed but no contestant was eliminated this week. In the following weeks, the viewers had a chance to act as judges. From the second week onwards, the votes of the viewers received via SMS and the scores of the judges resulted in contestants having low scores to be eliminated.

In the first week, the weighting of the judges' scores was 90% while that of the viewers' votes was 10%. In the second week, the weighting of the judges' scores was 80% while that of the viewers' votes was 20%. In this manner the weighting of the votes of the viewers and the judges' scores was 50% each by the end of the fifth week. This weighting stayed constant till the Mega-Final. The result of the Mega-Final, though, were solely decided by the votes of the viewers. So also there was a jury of 5 reputed singers which included Shridhar Phadke, Devaki Pandit, Pt. Sanjeev Abhyankar, Suresh Wadkar and Asha Khadilkar, who along with Avadhoot and Vaishali were assessing the participants.

== Rounds ==
The competition consisted of the following rounds.

=== Preliminary round ===
Talented contestants who had to leave the contest because of a minor difference in scores were given another chance in a special "Call Back" round. A total of two "Juniors" and four "Seniors" were selected for the Quarter-Final from the "Call Back" round.

=== Quarter-final ===
In the second stage, i.e. in the Quarter Final, 12 "Junior" contestants were split across 3 groups while 24 "Senior" contestants were split across 4 groups. "Junior" contestants performed on the episodes broadcast on Mondays while the "Senior" contestants performed on the episodes broadcast on Tuesdays.

The Quarter-Final round for the "Junior" contestants went on for three weeks. Two contestants were eliminated on every Monday. The six contestants who were selected at the end of the third week competed again in the fourth week. The best four contestants out of these were chosen for the Semi-Final round. The Quarter-Final round for the "Senior" contestants went on for four weeks. Three contestants were eliminated on every Tuesday. At the end of the fourth week, two eliminated contestants whose scores were the highest amongst those eliminated were selected for the Semi-Final round. In this manner, four "Junior" and fourteen "Senior" contestants, for a total of eighteen contestants competed in the Semi-Final round.

=== Semi-final ===
The Semi-Final round went on for three weeks. The selected eighteen contestants were split into three groups of six each. There was no distinction between "Seniors" and "Juniors". Every contestant performed a song on the episodes broadcast on Monday and Tuesday. Two contestants were eliminated at the end of the episode broadcast on Tuesdays.

=== Final ===
Twelve contestants contested the Final round. Every week one contestant was supposed to leave the contest.

== Elimination chart ==
=== Round 1 to Semi-final ===
Numbers in the cells indicate the episode in which the contestant performed in a <Week>.<Episode> format. For example, 4.1 in the Round 1 column indicates the 1st episode i.e. the one on the Monday of the 4th week of Round 1.

Legend
Did Not Perform	Performed	Eliminated	Winner

Singer	Round 1	Round 1 Callbacks	Round 2	Round 2 Callbacks	Semi-Final
Abhishek Saraf	3.1		1.1		
Aditi Subhedar	1.1		3.1		
Aditya Apte	5.2		3.2		
Aishwarya Sahasrabuddhe	3.2		4.2		1
Anuja Kamat	1.2	1.2	2.2		
Anushka Kulkarni	4.2		3.2		
Aarya Ambekar	1.2		2.2		1
Ashish Kulkarni	1.2	1.2	4.2		
Avanti Patel	1.2		3.2		3
Bhagyashri Tikle	5.1		3.1	4.1	2
Chinmay Kale	3.2				
Divya Dicholkar	4.2				
Juilee Joglekar	4.2				
Kalyani Bhande	3.2	1.2	2.2		
Kartiki Gaikwad	2.1		1.1	4.1	3
Kasturi Joshi	4.1				
Kaustubh Mulay	1.2		1.2		
Ketaki Mategaonkar	2.2		3.2		2
Krutika Borkar	2.1				
Malavika Dikshit	1.1				
Manasi Deshpande	3.2		3.2		
Mayuri Atre	5.1	1.1	1.1		
Mihir Khare	3.2		2.2		2
Mohit Karle	4.2		1.2		1
Mugdha Kale	3.1	1.1			
Mugdha Vaishampayan	4.1		2.1	4.1	1
Neha Karmarkar	1.2		4.2		1
Prajakta Marathe	5.2		2.2		
Prathamesh Laghate	2.2		4.2		2
Radhika Nande	5.2		1.2		2
Rageshri Vairagkar	5.1		1.1	4.1	3
Revati Tanawade	2.1		2.1	4.1	
Rohit Raut	4.2		3.2		1
Rutuja Phatak	4.2		1.2		
Sagar Phadke	2.2		2.2		3
Sanchita Garge	2.2		4.2		3
Saraswati Borgaonkar	2.2	1.2			
Shalmali Sukhtankar	5.2		1.2		3
Shamika Bhide	5.2	1.2	1.2		2
Sharayu Date	1.1		3.1	4.1	
Sharvari Naik	3.1				
Shirin Kelkar	5.1				
Shraddha Joshi	3.2		4.2		
Shreya Datar	1.1				
Shreya Karlekar	4.1		2.1		
Shridhar Patankar	2.1	1.1			
Sukrut Tamhankar	5.2				
Vaidehi Mekde	4.1	1.1	2.1		
Vaishnavi Paralikar	2.2	1.2			
Veda Nerurkar	3.1		3.1		

=== Final and Mega-Final ===
Legend
Did Not Perform	Performed	Eliminated	Winner

Round:	Final																		Mega-Final
Week:	1	2	3	4	5	6	7	8	9	10*	11	12	13	14	15	16	17	18	19
Contestant	Result																		
Aarya Ambekar										10.1									
Avanti Patel										10.1									
Kartiki Gaikwad										10.2									
Ketaki Mategaonkar																			
Mugdha Vaishampayan										10.1									
Neha Karmarkar																			
Prathamesh Laghate										10.1									
Radhika Nande										10.2									
Rohit Raut										10.1									
Sagar Phadke																			
Shalmali Sukhtankar										10.2									
Shamika Bhide										10.1									

* The numbers in the Week 10 column indicate which episodes during the week the contestants performed.

== Seasons ==
Season	Originally Broadcast		Days
Season	First aired	Last aired	Days
1	7 July 2008	8 February 2009	Mon-Tue
2	2 August 2010	9 January 2011	Wed-Thu
3	24 June 2021	12 December 2021	Thu-Sat
4	9 August 2023	25 November 2023	Wed-Sat

== Awards ==
Zee Marathi Utsav Natyancha Awards
Year	Category	Recipient
2009	Best Event	Grand Finale
2009	Best Judge	Avadhoot Gupte
2009	Best Anchor Female	Pallavi Joshi
2009	Best Non-fiction Show	Essel Vision Productions
2010	Best Judge	Avadhoot Gupte
2021	Best Anchor Female	Mrunmayee Deshpande
2023	Best Anchor Female	Mrunmayee Deshpande

== Reception ==
Week	Year	TAM TVR	Rank		Ref.
Week	Year	TAM TVR	Mah/Goa	All India	Ref.
Week 39	2008	0.85	1	88	
Week 45	2008	1.02	1	67	
Week 47	2008	1.15	1	29	
Week 50	2008	1.33	1	45	
Week 1	2009	1.55	1	33	
Week 3	2009	2.0	1	19	
Week 5	2009	2.1	1	20	
8 February 2009	Grand Finale	2.66	1	10	
Week 31	2010	0.88	1	70	
9 January 2011	Grand Finale	0.83	1	88	
