= Mugdha Vaishampayan =

Indian singer (born 2000)

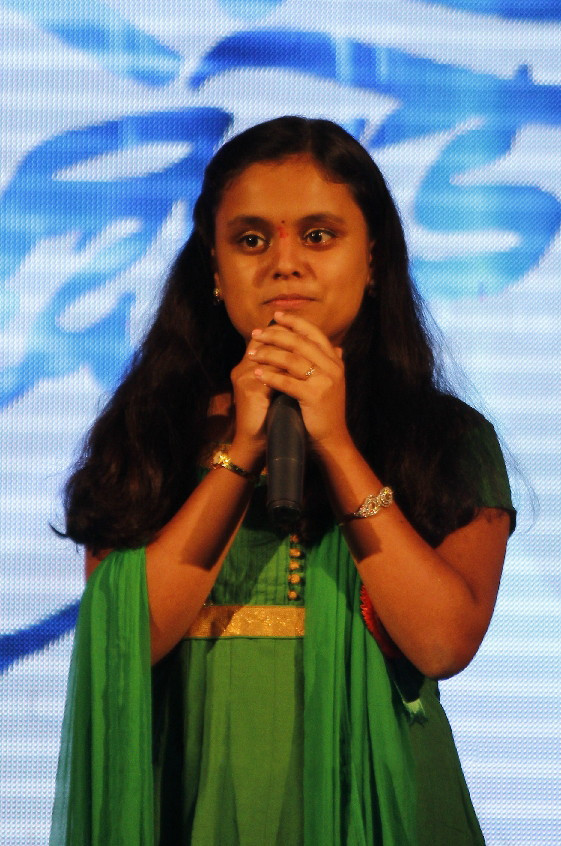

Background information
- Also known as: Little Monitor
- Born: Mugdha Bhagwan Vaishampayan; 5 April 2000 (age 26)
- Origin: Alibag, Maharashtra, India
- Genres: Indian classical music
- Occupation: Singer
- Instrument: Vocal
- Years active: 2008–present
- Label: Universal Music
- Partner: Prathamesh Laghate

Mugdha Vaishampayan (born 5 April 2000) is one of the finalists in the Marathi championship of Sa Re Ga Ma Pa Marathi Li'l Champs, which aired on Zee Marathi television between July 2008 and February 2009. She was referred to as "Little Monitor".

In 2009 and 2010, Mugdha appeared in many stage shows and public events, and her career currently extends to music albums, playback for movies and TV serials, media commercials, reality show anchoring, promotional campaigns for leading Newspapers, and performing in her solo singing programs.

== Background ==
Mugdha was born in Alibaug, the daughter of Bhagwan and Bhagyashree Vaishampayan. Mugdha's ability to sing was identified by her father when she was 2 years old, and she received formal training in fundamental music from Sunil Mhatre, Sheetal Kunte, Anuradha Velankar and Bhagwan Vaishampayan. After her run in Sa Re Ga Ma Pa Marathi Li'l Champs, her name became familiar to the residents of Maharashtra. The people of Konkan call her "Raigad Kanya" (Daughter of Raigad).

== Personal life ==
Mugdha Vaishampayan tied the knot with Prathamesh Laghate on 20 December 2023 who is a singer in Sa Re Ga Ma Pa Marathi Li'l Champs reality show aired on Zee Marathi.

== Career ==
=== Television anchor ===
Mugdha was one of the anchor for Season 2 telecast of Music reality show Sa Re Ga Ma Pa Marathi Li'l Champs on Zee Marathi. This schedule was telecasted during 2 August 2010 to 23 January 2011.

=== Sa Re Ga Ma Pa Marathi Li'l Champs ===
In 2008, Mugdha first auditioned for Sa Re Ga Ma Pa Marathi Li'l Champs, a competitive music reality show produced Zee Marathi. She became one of 50 finalists chosen from among several thousand age 8 to 14 children from Maharashtra, and ended as one of the top 5 finalists overall. On the show she was known as "The Little Monitor".

During the course of the competition, Mugdha was awarded with the title "Raigad Bhushan" by Raigad Zilha Parishad and is one of the youngest persons to have received such award from any elected Government body.

=== Hindi series ===
Mugdha was cast as a lead playback singer for daily soap Kashi being broadcast on NDTV Imagine. This marked the first time she sang a Hindi song, as well as her first assignment as a playback singer on television. Her song was recorded in March 2010 and featured in several episodes as a theme song.

=== Marathi films ===
In April 2010, sang a playback for Marathi films when Nandu Ghanekar offered her a song in Balaji Telefilm's first Marathi movie named Taaryaanche Bayt (Marathi: ताऱ्यांचे बेट) (The Island of stars). Her song "Kamaal aahe" is the main song of the film, which was released on 14 April 2011.

Mugdha also contributed to the Marathi-language movie Let's Go Back where in June 2010 she sang Bigi Bigi. She recorded the title track for Let's Go Back in July 2010. In May 2011, Mugdha recorded the title song for the movie "Ya gol gol dabyatala". This film was released in 2012.

Mugdha contributed to the Marathi-language movie Chintamani released in 2014, she sang "Kadhitari Kuthetari" along with Amruta Subhash. She did major contribution as a playback singer in the film Ubuntu which was released in September 2017.

=== Brand ambassador ===
In November 2010, Mugdha became a brand ambassador for the "Jungle Book" contest of the Marathi daily newspaper Lokmat, and has been cast as leading ambassador for the Marathi Home Calmanac Kalnirnay (Marathi: कालनिर्णय). Commercials featuring Mugdha began airing in November 2010 on all Marathi Television channels.

=== Public appearances ===
Mugdha has performed her art for events including

- Swartarang Mumbai Police Kalyan Melava in Kalyan 2008 telecasted on Zee Marathi.
- Vasantotsav – Musical concert arranged in Pune every year by Rahul Deshpande in memory of his legendary grandfather Pandit Vasantrao Deshpande in 2008.
- Zee Gaurav Puraskar 2009.
- Shrimant Dagadusheth Halwai Ganapati Music Festival April 2009.
- Little Champs Live Shows in many cities like Mumbai, Panvel, Pune, Sangli, Aurangabad, Goa, Ratnagiri, Thane, Nagpur, etc. and at international venues like Dubai, Abu Dhabi. These are runaway popular shows arranged by Zee Marathi where Mugdha performs with four other Little Champs Aarya Ambekar, Prathamesh Laghate, Rohit Raut and Kartiki Gaikwad in a perfect sync. This group is known as Panch-Ratna.
- As a celebrity guest in 'Sa Re Ga Ma Pa – Punha Nave Swapna Swaranche' season 7 in October 2009.
- Live performance in the devotional programme arranged in the presence of Sathya Sai Baba in Sai Ashram at village Hadshi, near Pune in October 2009.
- Live performance in Dr. Salil Kulkarni and Sandeep Khare's famous program Ayushyavar Bolu Kahi at allibaug on 3 October 2009
- Live performance in the special programme arranged on the occasion of Birthday of Sathya Sai Baba in Sai Ashram at Puttaparthi in November 2009.
- Shrimant Dagadusheth Halwai Ganapati Music Festival March 2010.
- Live performance along with Lata Mangeshkar in special function organized by ShivSena on occasion of the Golden Jubilee Year of Maharashtra State on Maharashtra Din
- Diwali Special Musical Concert – Nashik 2010
- Satpur Special Program
- From November 2010, Mugdha has set out on a promotional tour for the "Jungle Book Contest" of Marathi leading daily Lokmat. She along with other two artists – Miss Owi Dixit (The winner of Dance Reality show) and Satyajit Padhye, a budding ventriloquist, puppeteer and puppet maker, are visiting schools in major cities of Maharashtra to campaign for "Jungle Book Contest".
- In the first leg of this promotional tour, they have covered school events in Nashik and Kolhapur.
- As a chief guest and lead performer in Republic day celebration at Alibaug beach. 3000 students took an oath to protect & preserve Indian Constitution in a spectacular program conducted by Mugdha. (January 2011)
- Nashik Festival – 2011
- Chennai – January 2020 Performed live in Twenty-Sixth Bhajanotsav at Madras Shri Kashi Math, which was her first live performance in the city.
