= Ubuntu (film) =

2017 film

- Directed by: Pushkar Shrotri
- Screenplay by: Pratima Kulkarni
- Story by: Bhalchandra Kubal
- Produced by: Pushkar Shrotri
- Starring: Sarang Sathye; Shashank Shende; Bhagyashri Sankpal; Umesh Jagtap; Kanha Bhave; Atharva Padhye
- Cinematography: Suman Sahu
- Edited by: Ashish Mhatre; Apurva Motivale-Sahai
- Music by: Kaushal Inamdar
- Production company: Anjaneya Sathe Entertainment
- Release date: 15 September 2017
- Country: India
- Language: Marathi

Ubuntu (transl. 'Compassion and humanity') is a 2017 Marathi language drama film which is produced and directed by Pushkar Shrotri

== Cast ==
- Shashank Shende as Sarpanch
- Sarang Sathaye as Mastar
- Umesh Jagtap as Razzak
- Bhagyashree Shankpal as Gauri
- Kanha Bhave as Sanket
- Atharva Padhye as Abdul
- Arati More as Salma
- Shubham Pawar as Vikas
- Arya Hadkar as Chandu
- Purvesh Kotian as Madhav
- Chaitrali Gadkari as Ankita
- Arya Saudagar as Manju
- Balkrushna Raul as Balkrushna
- Yogini Pophale as Gauri's Mother
- Smruti Patkar as Sarpanch's Wife
- Kalpana Jagtap as Abdul's Mother
- Satish Joshi as Villager

== Release ==
Ubuntu released on 15 September 2017 with English subtitles in Maharashtra, Gujarat, Goa, Madhya Pradesh, Delhi, Karnataka, Andhra Pradesh and Telangana.

== Box office ==
The film started with a low occupancy but the evening shows picked up and went higher in terms of occupancy and collection. As per reports, the 1st day box office collection for Ubuntu tolled to around 1.2 crores on the box office.

== Soundtrack ==
Ubuntu

Soundtrack album by Ajit Parab, Mugdha Vaishampayan
- Released: 15 September 2017
- Genre: Feature film soundtrack
- Language: Marathi

== Music ==
The songs for the film are composed by Kaushal Inamdar.
