= Sudhir Nayak =

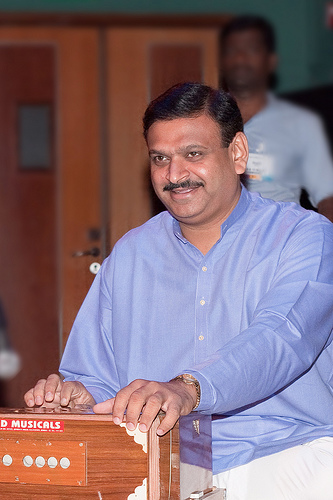
- Sudhir Nayak

Background information
- Born: 15 May 1972 (age 54); Mumbai, India
- Origin: India
- Genres: Indian classical, Hindustani Classical (Raag Sangeet)-Khayal, Thumri-Dadra and allied forms, Religious, Folk, Confluence & Cross Cultural
- Occupations: Harmonium player, Composer
- Instrument: Harmonium
- Years active: 1983–present

Sudhir Nayak (Marathi: सुधीर नायक, Kannada: ಸುಧೀರ್ ನಾಯಕ್, born 15 May 1972) is an Indian classical Harmonium player, a disciple of Pandit Tulsidas Borkar and Pandit Jitendra Abhisheki. He is also a music composer of repute and is constantly engaged in teaching music to students regularly and also through workshops and interactive sessions.

== Early life ==
Sudhir Nayak (b. 15 May 1972) was born to Kota Sarvottam Nayak and Suvarny Nayak in Mumbai. His parents hailing from the South Canara district of Coastal Karnataka, later moved to Mumbai.

His father K. S. Nayak retired from his services as a Banker with Canara Bank and is currently engaged in the practice and propagation of Vipassana meditation under the aegis of the Vipassana International Academy.

Sudhir's mother, Suvarny Nayak is also engaged in teaching music and also performs religious and devotional songs in Hindi, Marathi, Kannada, Konkani, etc. through music concerts.

Sudhir Nayak holds a bachelor's degree in commerce from Pune university studying at MES's Garware College of Commerce, Pune.

== Music education ==
Following his father's inclination, Sudhir was introduced to Indian music at the age of eleven, when Sudhir and his brother started learning the Tabla from Pandit Madhukar Samant of Goregaon, Mumbai at his music class named 'Swar- Ninad' which facilitated Sudhir to listen and relate to sounds of different musical instruments taught at the class. In the meantime, he also got acquainted with Hindustani Raag Sangeet through Pandit Pundalik Prabhu who used to visit their residence to teach vocal music to his mother.

But Sudhir's actual initiation in Music followed his association with the legendary Harmonium maestro Pandit Tulsidas Borkar in 1983 when Borkarji started frequenting to his residence to teach Marathi Natya Sangeet to his mother. The captivating persona of Pandit Tulsidas Borkar and the subtle touches used by him while playing the Harmonium coupled with the grace with which he approached the instrument, deeply attracted young Sudhir to pursue learning the art from him. Seeing Sudhir's fascination, Borkarji accepted Sudhir as his disciple which enabled Sudhir to learn and imbibe the stylistic techniques used by his Guru and grand Guru Pandit P. Madhukar (Madhukar Pednekar) greatly influencing and enriching Sudhir's style of exploring the Harmonium as a solo instrument apart from playing it as an accompanying instrument for vocal music.

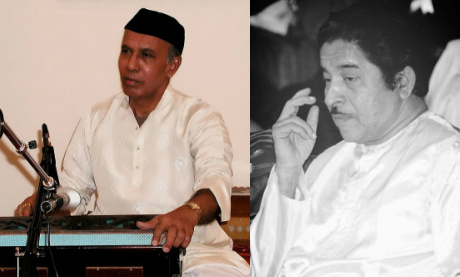
Pandit Tulsidas Borkar and Pandit Jitendra Abhisheki

Another great turn in Sudhir's life was his association with legendary vocalist and composer Pandit Jitendra Abhisheki, whose music and versatility greatly inspired Sudhir's journey as a student of music. His taleem from Panditji in Pune from 1988 till his demise in 1998 allowed Sudhir to gain knowledge of the intricacies of Hindustani Raag Sangeet and the nuances in the styles and approach of different Gharanas and Gayakis. Sudhir also accompanied Pandit Jitendra Abhisheki on the harmonium for his vocal concerts and also assisted him in composing music for different projects. Sudhir also benefitted from the guidance he received from Shri. Jayant Keshav Watve and Shri. Bhaurao Mahadev Pawar, for a brief period, while in Pune.

== Career ==
At an early age, Sudhir had the honour of accompanying stalwarts in the field of Indian Music like Pandit Bhimsen Joshi, Pt. Jitendra Abhisheki, Pt. Firoz Dastur, Pt. Ram Ashreya Jha, Pt. S C R Bhat, Pt. Dinkar Kaikini, Pt.Yastwantbuva Joshi, Pt. Babanrao Haldankar, Pt. Jasraj, Smt. Gangubai Hangal, Smt. Padmavati Shaligram, Dr. Prabha Atre, Smt. Shobha Gurtu, Pt. Birju Maharaj, to name a few. He is also regularly associated with contemporary musicians like Shubha Mudgal, Rajan & Sajan Misra, Ajoy Chakravarty, Rashid Khan, Ulhas Kashalkar, Aneesh Pradhan, Shounak Abhisheki, Shruti Sadolikar- Katkar, Padma Talwalkar, Ashwini Bhide-Deshpande, Devaki Pandit, Arati Tikekar among many others.

Sudhir's musical performances are regularly featured on Indian television and commercial recordings. He has also performed widely in the US, the UK, the USSR, Canada, Mexico, Europe, Australia, Africa, the Far Eastern and the Middle Eastern countries.

Sudhir is equally at home with harmonium solo renditions as he is with accompaniment and has composed music for many musical productions.

Sudhir also participates in cross-cultural collaborations being a part of the ensemble 'Koshish'.

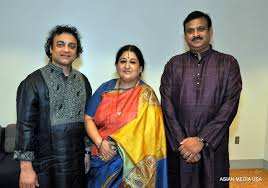
Shubha Mudgal, Dr. Aneesh Pradhan and Sudhir Nayak

Sudhir has also composed music for many projects and albums which have been recorded and published commercially

Passionate about the study and development of the Harmonium, Sudhir curated an exhibition of antique Harmoniums from his personal vintage collection, along with providing information about the history and the status of the Harmonium, in the International Music Festival 'Baajaa Gaajaa- 2009", which was appreciated by many reputed personalities from the field of Music and fine arts. He also conducts workshops related to the Harmonium at different places in India and abroad. Sudhir is also associated with special projects like 'Fearless Nadia', theatrical productions like 'Stories in a song' and music festivals like 'Baajaa Gaajaa' which have gained international acclaim.

He has been invited as a visiting lecturer through the Department of Fine Arts and Music, University of Pittsburgh, USA. He has also performed and conducted interactive sessions for music students of Stanford, Berkeley, Brandeis, Yale University and Ithaca College, USA, Griffith University, Brisbane and other educational institutions and universities around the globe. He has also participated in many international festivals and projects like The Indian Voices Festival- BBC Proms Festival at The Royal Albert Hall (London), The Perth Arts Festival (Perth), Cumbre Tajin Festival, (Mexico), Sacred Music Festival (Brisbane), Paramasala Festival (Sydney), Melbourne Festival (Melbourne) etc. Sudhir currently teaches a course in Harmonium at the University of Mumbai.

== Awards and recognitions ==
1. 4 January 2020: 'Sanvadini Saadhak Puraskaar' (2019–2020) instituted in the name of Vithalrao Korgaonkar awarded by Surel Sanvadini Sanvardhan, Belgaum.
2. 22 January 2017: 'Harmonium Maharishi Bandubhaiyya Choughule Smriti Samman', awarded by the Bandubhaiyya Choughule Smriti Samaroh Samiti, Indore.
3. 28 April 2014: 'Swar- Laya- Ratna' Puraskar instituted by Ganvardhan, Pune in the memory of Late Pt. Appasaheb Jalgaonkar
4. 3 December 2013: 'Pt. Govindrao Tembe Smruti Sangatkaar Puraskar' instituted by the Gandharva Mahavidyalaya, Pune
5. 20 January 2010: 'Saraswat Yuva Puraskar' for excellence in the field of culture at the Yuva Sammelan, Mangalore
6. 5 January 2007: 'Saath Sangat Pravin Award 2006' instituted by the Rajeev Goenka Academy for Classical Music and other Fine Arts under the auspices of The Music Forum, Mumbai jointly with the ITC Sangeet Research Academy, Kolkata

Sudhir has the honour of having performed along with Pandit Bhimsen Joshi at the Central Hall of the Parliament of India, on the occasion marking the Golden Jubilee celebrations of India's independence and with Shubha Mudgal to mark celebrate 60 years of the Parliament of India.

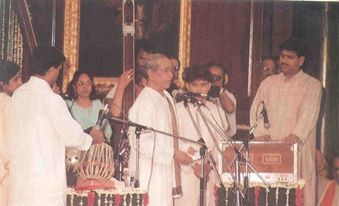
Performing with Pt. Bhimsen Joshi at the Central Hall of the Parliament of India to mark to completion of 50 Years of India's Independence (15 August 1997).

== Personal life ==
Sudhir Nayak is married to Bharati Nayak and they have a daughter, Maitreyi. Sudhir and Bharati are actively involved in organising events related to music and arts and run a music circle in Thakur Village, Kandivali East suburb of Mumbai, named as the Village Music Club, which has gained recognition in the cultural map of Mumbai within a short span of time. They are also actively involved in the development of KALA COAST, Global Music & Arts Village at Karje- Brahmavar in the Udupi district of Coastal Karnataka.
