= Mehmood Dhaulpuri =

Indian musician (1954–2011)

- Born: 23 March 1954; Dhaulpur, Rajasthan, India
- Died: 25 May 2011 (aged 57); New Delhi, India
- Occupations: Musician; Instrumentalist
- Known for: Harmonium
- Children: Three daughters and two sons
- Awards: Padma Shri

Mehmood Dhaulpuri (23 March 1954 – 25 May 2011) was an Indian musician of Hindustani music, known as a leading exponent of Harmonium, an Indian variant of the Pump organ. He was an accompanist to renowned Hindustani vocalists such as Parveen Sultana, Bhimsen Joshi, Jasraj, Girija Devi, Kishori Amonkar and Ustad Ghulam Sadiq Khan. The Government of India awarded him the fourth highest civilian honour of the Padma Shri, in 2006, for his contributions to Music, making him the first harmonium player to receive the award.

== Biography ==
Mehmood Dhaulpuri was born on 23 March 1954 in Dhaulpur in the India state of Rajasthan, in a family of musicians; his grandfather, Buddha Khan, was a known Sarangi player. His early training was in Sarangi, from his family, and he started playing the instrument by the time he was eleven. It was reported that Dhaulpuri was fascinated by harmonium after seeing the 1966 Bollywood film, Love in Tokyo, and trained under many gurus such as Nasir Ahmad Khan of the Delhi gharana. Soon, he started playing as an accompanist to leading vocalists and Rajan and Sajan Mishra, Parveen Sultana, Bhimsen Joshi, Jasraj, Girija Devi and Kishori Amonkar are some of the musicians he played with. He also played with other known musicians such as Ashwini Bhide-Deshpandee, Shubha Mudgal and Meeta Pandit and performed jugalbandi with Zakir Hussain, renowned tabla player.

In 2006, the Government of India awarded him the civilian honour of the Padma Shri, the first time a harmonium player being awarded the Padma honours. Many of his performances have been brought out as audio CDs, including an album, Raga Lalit, with Rajan and Sajan Mishra duo. Dhaulpuri was working at the University of Delhi when he was admitted to the St Stephen's Hospital, Delhi due to respiratory ailments where he spent 55 days before succumbing to organ failure on 25 May 2011. He was survived by his wife, three daughters and two sons.

== See also ==
- Harmonium
- Parveen Sultana
- Bhimsen Joshi
- Jasraj
- Girija Devi
- Kishori Amonkar
- Rajan and Sajan Mishra
- Ashwini Bhide-Deshpande
- Shubha Mudgal
- Zakir Hussain
