= Yogini Joglekar =

Marathi writer

- Born: 6 August 1925
- Died: 1 November 2005 (aged 80); Pune, Maharashtra
- Occupation: Singer

Yogini Joglekar (6 Aug 1925 – 1 November 2005) was a Marathi writer, poet and also a classical singer.

== Personal life ==
In her memory, her family has released a Devnagari Unicode font "Aksharyogini". She died on 1 November 2005 at the age of 80 due to prolonged disease.

== Career ==
Yogini was born in Pune in 1925 and completed her school education in B.A. She was working as teacher between 1948 and 1953. She did a lot of social work through "Rashtrasevika Samiti". There are 116 books to her credit which includes 50 novels, 39 Short stories collection and many others like collection of poems, poems for children etc. Her novel "Ya sam Ha" on Bhaskarbuva Bakhale and "Ram Prahar" on Ram Marathe was special and got a lot of recognition.

She was learning classical singing since the age of 8 from Shankar buva Ashtekar and then from Ram Marathe. Also, she received classical music training for some period from Sangeetkalanidhi Master Krishnarao Phulambrikar. She sang for the Marathi film "Pahili Manglagaur" as a playback singer.

== Books ==
1. Niragas निरागस
2. Shilangan शिलांगण
3. Kunasathi Konitari कुणासाठी कुणीतरी
4. Jag जाग
5. Chaitannya चैतन्या
6. Sakshatkar साक्षात्कार
7. Umala उमाळा
8. Chimakhade चिमखडे अर्थात बडबड गीते
9. Upahar उपहार
10. Swaha स्वाहा
11. Nadbrhma नादब्रह्म
12. Paygun पायगुण
13. Aaswad आस्वाद
14. Dahihandi दहीहंडी
15. Sharyat शर्यत
16. Shri Ganesha श्रीगणेशा
17. Navi Vaat नवी वाट
18. Baplek बापलेक
19. Ashwath अश्वत्थ
20. Charuchi Aai चारूची आई

== Articles ==
1. Shravan

== Songs ==
1. मधुर स्वरलहरी या Madhur Swar Lahari Ya
2. सखे बाई सांगते मी Sakhe Bai Sangate Mi
3. हरीची ऐकताच मुरली Harichi Aikatach Murali
4. हे सागरा नीलांबरा He Sagara Nilambara
