= Prakash Ulliyeri =

Music composer (born 1970)

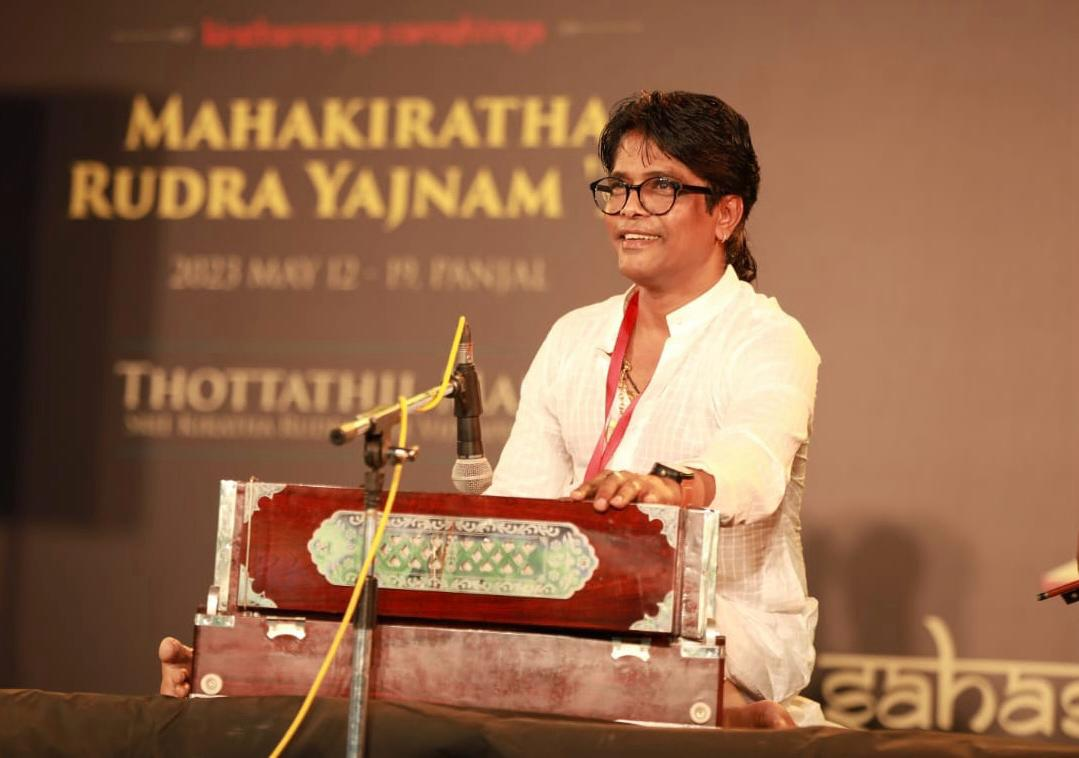

Background information
- Born: 10 May 1970; Ulliyeri, Kozhikode, Kerala, India)
- Genres: Indian classical
- Occupations: Composer; Singer; Instrumentalist
- Instrument: Harmonium pump organ
- Spouse: Jitha
- Children: 1

Prakash Ulliyeri (born 10 May 1970) is an Indian musician and instrumentalist from Ulliyeri, Kozhikode, Kerala. He is known for playing the harmonium and keyboard.

== Early life and education ==
Ulliyeri's father, Gopala Paniker, was a Nadaswaram artist, and his mother, Madhavi, was a folk singer. This early exposure to music and his father's guidance led him to develop a taste for art as a child.

Ulliyeri's formal training took place at the Chembai Memorial Music College in Palakkad. During his time working with the Nadam orchestra, Ulliyeri practiced harmonium and grew skilled at playing ghazals.

== Career ==
Prakash Ulliyeri's music spans various genres, including fusion, Carnatic classical, and film music. He garners attention for his solo performances, particularly on the harmonium, which he also teaches.

Throughout his career, Prakash Ulliyeri has collaborated with many artists, including Hariharan, Shankar Mahadevan, and Pankaj Udhas. He has performed in London's Royal Albert Hall and Australia's Sydney Opera House.

Ulliyeri has contributed to Malayalam films and popular albums with his harmonium performances. His collaborations include ghazal, fusion, and jugalbandi performances. His initiative "Navam" blends Hindustani vocals, Western backing, and traditional Kerala instruments.

In July 2025, he composed the soundtrack and background score for the Malayalam film Raveendra Nee Evide?, including the single “Mazha Mazha” sung by Shankar Mahadevan.

He is a founding member and State General Secretary of the Kerala Artist Fraternity and is the Chairman of the Palakkad district and a member of the Board of Trustees.

Ulliyeri is also the founder of Thatva Musical Solutions, an institution for music education.

== Awards ==
In 2022, Ulliyeri received the Kerala Sangeetha Nataka Akademi Award.

== See also ==
- Indian music
