= Bharati Achrekar =

Indian actress (Born: 1957)

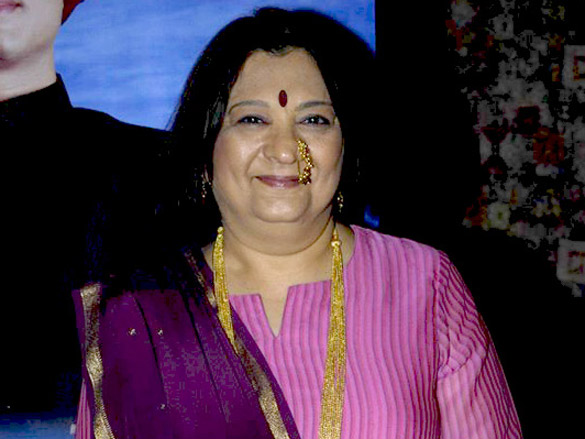
- Born: Bharati Varma; 13 February 1960 (age 66); Pune, Maharashtra, India
- Education: Ramnarain Ruia College, Mumbai
- Occupation: Actress
- Years active: 1980–present
- Spouse: Dr. Vijay Achrekar (m. 1978; died 1984)
- Children: 1
- Parent(s): Amar Varma (father); Manik Varma (mother)
- Relatives: Vandana Gupte (sister); Rani Varma (sister)

Bharati Achrekar (born 13 February 1960) is an Indian Marathi and Hindi theatre, film and television actress. She has been a part of several films in Indian cinema and was celebrated as Mrs Wagle from the Doordarshan show, Wagle ki Duniya. She is starring as Radhika Wagle in Wagle Ki Duniya – Nayi Peedhi Naye Kissey. Her son Siddharth Achrekar played lead guitar for the Indian rock-band Colourblind, with Ram Sampath.

== Career ==
Bharati made her acting debut with a Hindi drama Apne Paraye, directed by Basu Chatterjee. The series is based on the 1917 Bengali novel, Nishkriti written by Sarat Chandra.

== Filmography ==
=== Films ===
Year	Film	Role	Notes
1980	Apne Paraye	Naintara	
1982	Brij Bhoomi		Braj Bhasha language film
1985	Sanjog	Lalita	
1985	Ardhangi		Marathi film
1985	Sur Sangam		
1986	Chameli Ki Shaadi	Champa	
1989	Eeshwar		
1992	Beta	Mainavati	
2000	Phir Bhi Dil Hai Hindustani	Ria's mother	
2001	Haal E Dil		
2001	Little John		Hindi / English (bilingual film)
2002	Zindagi Khoobsoorat Hai		
2003	Flavors		English / Hindi (bilingual film)
2004	Aga Bai Arrecha!	Dr. Suhaas Phadke	Marathi film
2004	Saatchya Aat Gharat		
2006	Divasen Divas		
2008	Sanai Choughade		Marathi film
2008	Ugly Aur Pagli		
2008	Valu		Marathi film
2009	Aage Se Right		
2011	Desi Boyz	Jerry's mother	
2011	Rascals		
2012	Fatso!		
2013	Chashme Baddoor		
2013	The Lunchbox		Only Voice
2017	FU: Friendship Unlimited		Marathi film
2017	Patel Ki Punjabi Shaadi	Amma	
2017	Poster Boys		
2020	Coolie No. 1		
2022	De Dhakka 2	Queen Elizabeth (Fake)	Marathi film
2024	Panchak	Uttara khot	Marathi film
2026	Tighee	Hemlata Ranade	Marathi Film

=== Television ===
Year	Show	Role	Notes
1987–1988	Aa Bel Mujhe Maar		Hindi
1987	Kachchi Dhoop		
1988	Wagle Ki Duniya	Radhika Gokhale Wagle	
	Shrimati Sharma Na Kehti Thi	Mrs Sharma	Hindi
1995–1996	Teri Bhi Chup Meri Bhi Chup		Hindi
2000–2004	Son Pari	School Principal	
2006	Kyaa Hoga Nimmo Kaa	Kanta Maasi	
2008–2009	Main Kab Saas Banoongi	Saraswati	
2009–2014	Lapataganj	Saas of Mukundi lal	
2011–2017	Pudhcha Paaul	Kusum	Marathi Serial, guest
2011–2017	Chidiya Ghar	Billo Bua	
2015–2016	Sumit Sambhal Lega	Dolly Walia	
2015–2016	Siya Ke Ram		
2021–2025	Wagle Ki Duniya – Nayi Peedhi Naye Kissey	Radhika Gokhale Wagle	
2025–2026	Kyunki Saas Bhi Kabhi Bahu Thi 2	Malti Parmeshwar Gokhale	
2026	Kyunki Rishton Ke Bhi Roop Badalte Hain	Malti Parmeshwar Gokhale	
