= Aditya Oke =

Indian musician

- Born: Aditya; 20 December 1977 (age 48)
- Genre: Hindustani classical music
- Occupation: Harmonium player
- Instrument: Harmonium
- Years active: Since 1991

Aditya Oke is an Indian harmonium player, a sound engineer and a music arranger in films. He is a fourth-generation harmoniumist, learned harmonium from Govindrao Patwardhan.

He is married to Vedashree Oke, an actress and singer known for her Marathi songs.

== Career ==
Oke gave solo concerts in USA at the age of 17, and has accompanied singers including Asha Bhonsle, Jasraj, Suresh Wadkar, Kavita Krishnamoorthy, Jayateerth Mevundi, Rahul Deshpande and Anand Bhate. Besides Classical Music, he has played Harmonium for more than 50 films. He has been an Associate Musical Director for films, Balagandharva and Ajintha. He has made several performances during his career and contributed as harmonium player in many musical programs. He along with Satyajeet Prabhu have started an independent program on Harmonium as "Jaduchi Peti" (जादूची पेटी) where he explains the history of harmonium and motivates people to learn harmonium. He contributed as associate music director in the film Balgandharva. He is the director at "Audioarts", a music studio. He has done music arrangement for the movie Katyar Kaljat Ghusali.

== Programs and stage shows ==
1. "Jaduchi Peti" (जादूची पेटी) with Satyajit Prabhu
2. "Gandharv Gaan" with Anand Bhate

== Music Arranger ==
1. Balgandharva (film)
2. Katyar Kaljat Ghusali (film)
3. Bandish Bandits (prime web series)

== Awards ==
- 2011 - Mifta award in Japan
- 2012 - Anil Mohile Award for his contribution towards music industry
