= Kedar Naphade =

Indian classical harmonium player (born 1972)

Background information
- Born: January 10, 1972 (age 54)
- Origin: India
- Genre: Indian classical music
- Occupation: Musician
- Instrument: harmonium
- Years active: 1982–present

Kedar Naphade (Marathi: केदार नाफडे) is an Indian classical harmonium player.

== Early life ==
Kedar Naphade was born on 10 January 1972 to a Maharashtrian family in the city of Mumbai, India. From the age of 9, he started learning harmonium solo and accompaniment from Tulsidas Borkar. He also received education from Padmavati Shaligram-Gokhale of the Jaipur-Atrauli gharana from 1989–1993.

Kedar completed his engineering degree at the Indian Institute of Technology in Mumbai in 1993. Subsequently he moved to the United States, where he completed his Ph.D. in Operations Research from Lehigh University in 1997.

== Career ==
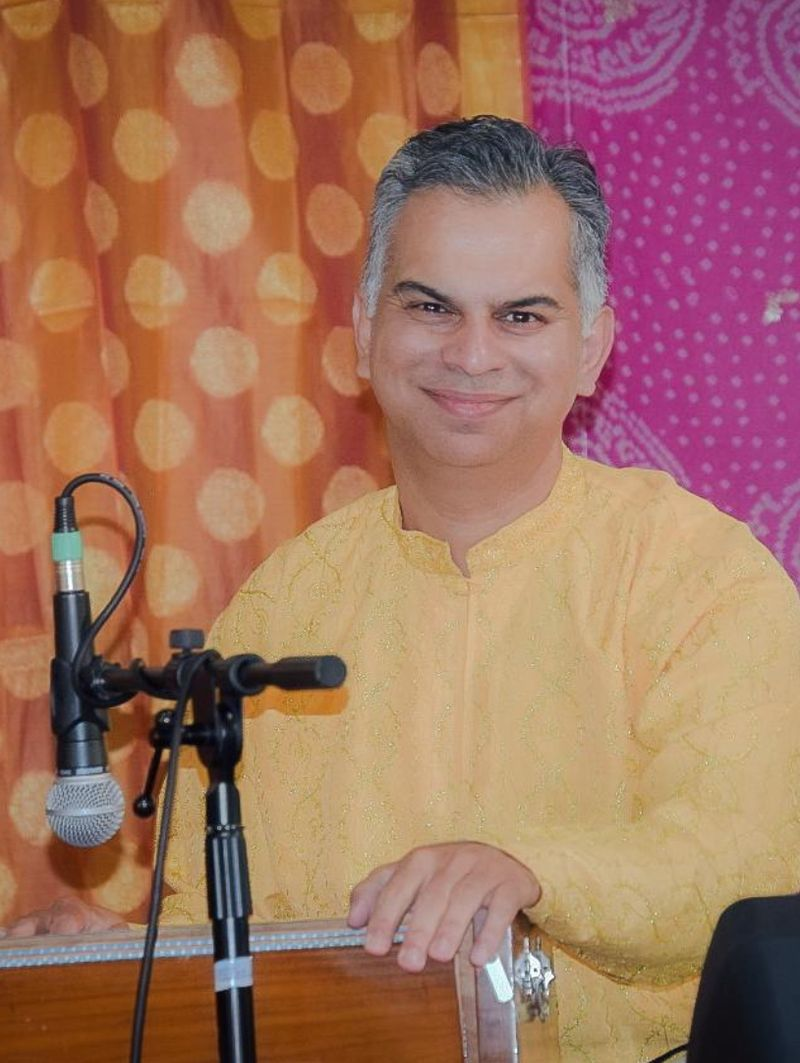
Kedar Naphade on Harmonium

Kedar Naphade on Harmonium

Kedar has been performing harmonium solo and accompaniment concerts since 1982. He was featured as a child artist on the Mumbai Television Channel Doordarshan in the early 1980s and started performing professionally as a soloist and accompanist of Hindustani classical music in 1990, at the age of 18. He became known with a concert at the Annual Alladiya Khan Smruti Samaroha in Mumbai, India with Smt. Padmavati Shaligram-Gokhalie in 1992.

Kedar's music is inspired by that of Tulsidas Borkar and P. Madhukar as well as that of Smt. Padmavati Gokhale Shaligram and the Hindustani Vocal music traditions. In addition to classical music, Kedar also plays the semi-classical forms of Marathi Natyasangeet (Stage Music), bhajans, and thumri.

Kedar has performed harmonium solo and has accompanied vocalists at numerous concerts in India, Europe and in the U.S. He has been invited to perform at festivals and venues such as the Alladiya Khan Smruti Samaroha, Dadar Matunga Cultural Center and Vile Parle Music Circle in Mumbai; Surel Samvadini Sanvardhan institute in Belgaum, Karnataka; Kala Academy in Panaji, Goa; Bharat Natya Mandir in Pune, Maharashtra; The London U.K. Marathi Mandal, The Lincoln Center, Carnegie Hall in New York City, The Smithsonian Institution in Washington, D.C., The LearnQuest Academy music conference in Boston, the Chhandayan Annual All Night Music Conference in New York (state).

Over several decades, Kedar has collaborated and shared the stage with prominent Hindustani classical musicians including Pandit Jasraj, Lakshmi Shankar, Veena Sahasrabuddhe, Prabha Atre, Ulhas Kashalkar, Kaushiki Chakraborty, Pandit Swapan Chaudhuri, Pandit Anindo Chatterjee, Ashwini Bhide-Deshpande, Mahesh Kale,. Kedar has also collaborated with Grammy Awards winning artist Chandrika Tandon, including a performance at Lincoln Center's I Meditate NY event. He has worked in instrumental ensembles with other instruments such as the Sitar, Flute, Violin and Mandolin.

In September 2026, Kedar toured the United States with Hindustani vocalist Kaushiki Chakraborty as part of her multi-city concert tour. The tour continued a musical collaboration between Kaushiki Chakraborty and Kedar extending back more than a decade.

Kedar Naphade is the Founder and Executive Director of The Harmonium Institute, a non-profit organization under Section 501(c)(3) of the IRS.

== Awards and recognitions ==
Swar Sadhana Samiti young artist award (1983, 1984)
