= Sadakat Aman Khan =

Indian musician

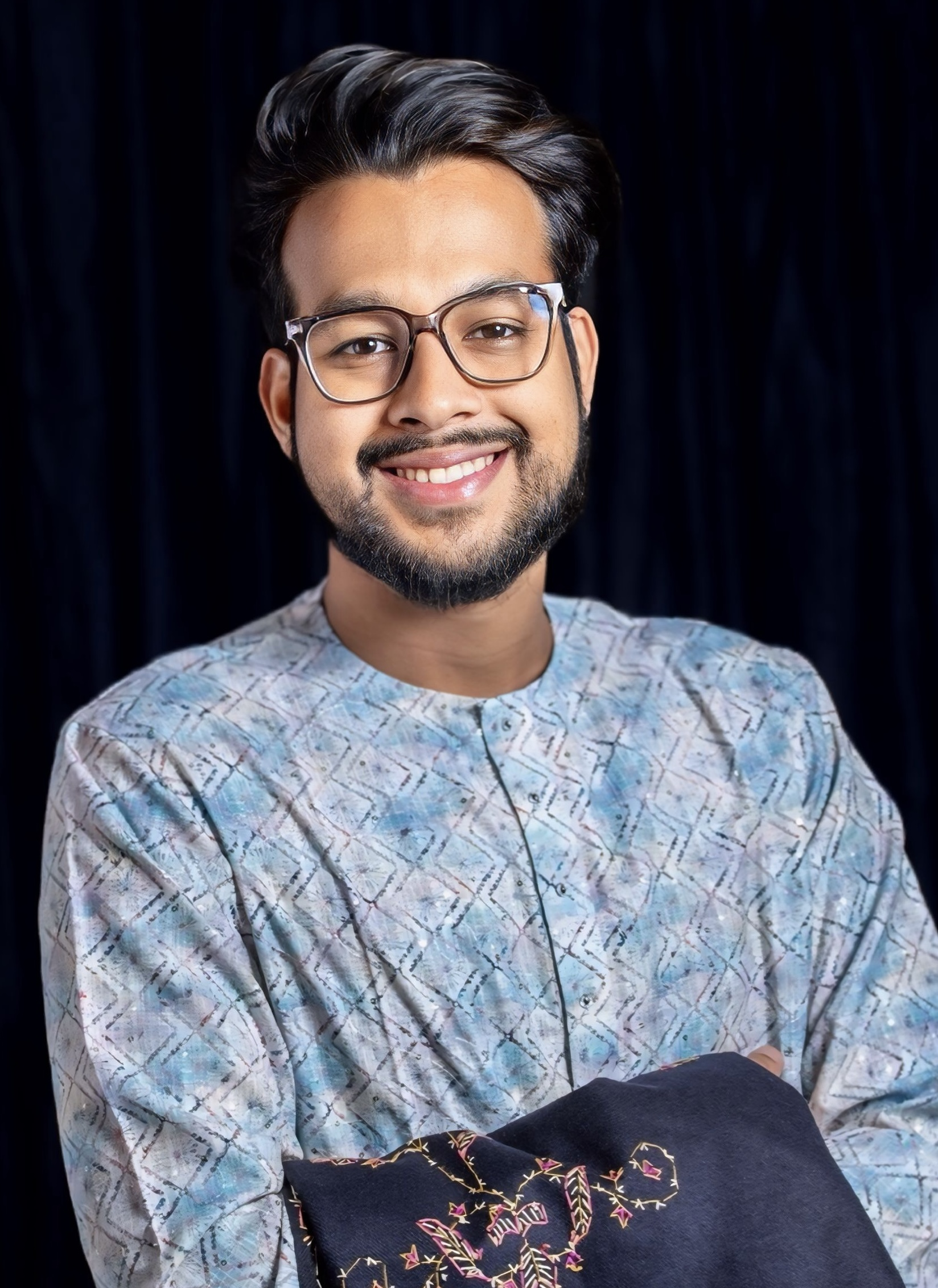
- Sadakat Aman Khan in 2025
- Born: 11 August 1997 (age 28); Malda, West Bengal, India
- Education: Coventry University (MBA); Kalinga Institute of Industrial Technology (B.Tech)
- Occupations: Musician; Composer; Author
- Years active: 2010–present
- Musical career
- Also known as: Mr. Harmonium
- Genres: Hindustani classical music, Harmonium metal
- Instruments: Harmonium; Piano; Melodica
- Label: Gramin Records
- Sadakat Aman Khan's voice Sadakat Aman Khan's Interview; Recorded 4 February 2026
- Website: sadakatamankhan.com

Sadakat Aman Khan is an Indian classical musician and harmonium player based in the United Kingdom. He performs Hindustani classical music and fusion on solo harmonium and is popularly known as "Mr. Harmonium."

He is the founder of Harmonium Metal.

== Early life and background ==
Khan was born in Malda, West Bengal, into a family of Hindustani classical musicians. His grandfather, Sangeetacharya Ustad Md. Yunus Khan, was a noted vocalist, and his parents are Ustad Sahadat Rana Khan, a prominent vocalist, and Najhum Ara Razi. Khan received his early musical training from his father and grandfather.

He completed a Bachelor of Technology in Computer Science Engineering at Kalinga Institute of Industrial Technology (KIIT University) in Bhubaneswar. He later completed an MBA in Global Business at Coventry University, London.

== Career ==
Khan began performing publicly in 2010 and has since given harmonium recitals in India and abroad. In 2020, he made his international debut with a solo concert at Nanhua University, Taiwan.

He has performed alongside musicians including Ustad Shafqat Ali Khan, Ustad Waseem Ahmed Khan, and Ustad Raza Ali Khan.

After relocating to the United Kingdom, he remained active as a performer of Hindustani classical and fusion music.

== Discography ==
- Ab Na Manoon Tori Batiyan (feat. Ustad Sahadat Rana Khan & Aniruddha Roy)
- Brij Dhaam (feat. Aniruddha Roy)
- Devil's Cry (feat. Siddharth & Shib)
- Indian National Anthem in Harmonium
- Bellicose

== Books ==
- Gharanas of Indian Music
- Basics of Harmonium
- 10 Thaats in Harmonium
