= Manik Varma =

Indian singer

- Born: 16 May 1926
- Died: 10 November 1996 (aged 70)
- Occupation: Singer
- Awards: Padma Shri (1974); Sangeet Natak Akademi Award (1986)

Manik Varma (16 May 1926 – 10 November 1996) was an Indian classical singer from the Kirana and Agra gharanas (singing styles). She was honored with the Padma Shri Award in 1974 for her contribution to the field of music.

== Career ==
Besides the pure classical khyal, she also sang semi-classical and light music like thumri, Marathi Natya Sangeet, Bhavgeet and Bhakti geet (devotional music). She was a disciple of Hirabai Barodekar and Sureshbabu Mane, daughter and son of Abdul Karim Khan, the founder of the Kirana gharana respectively.She also took her rigorous training in Thumri Gayaki from Pandit Bholanath Bhatt of ‘Bhatt Parampara’ in Prayag, Allahabad. She took further training from Azmat Hussain Khan "Dilrang" and Jagannathbua Purohit "Gunidas" of Agra gharana.

In April 1955, her songs became part of the Geet Ramayan, a presentation of songs on the Hindu god Rama, a weekly year-long programme by All India Radio (AIR), Pune, along with artists like Lata Mangeshkar, Yogini Joglekar, Usha Atre, Babanrao Navdikar, Lalitabai Phadke and Sudhir Phadke.

She trained students including Asha Khadilkar and Shaila Datar.

== Personal life ==
Her maiden name was Manik Dadarkar (Devanagari: माणिक दादरकर). She married Amar Varma. Her daughters include Rani Varma, also a singer, Aruna Jayprakash, Bharati Achrekar, an actor, and Vandana Gupte, a Marathi stage, film and television actor.

== Awards ==
She received the prestigious Padma Shri award from the government of India in 1974, followed by the Sangeet Natak Akademi Award given by the Sangeet Natak Akademi, India's National Academy for Music, Dance and Drama in 1986.

== Legacy ==
In her memory Manik Varma Pratishthan was established in Mumbai, which also presents Manik Ratna Award and scholarships. It also organises function on the birth and death anniversary of Manik Verma. On her eighth death anniversary, on 12 November 2004, a musical programme Baharla Parijaat Daari was presented by Devgandharva Bakhlebua Trust at Tilak Smarak Mandir in Pune.
