= Kaushal Inamdar =

Kaushal S. Inamdar
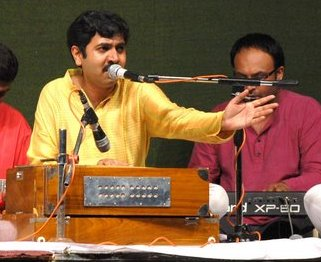

Background information
- Born: 2 October 1971 (age 55); Pune, Maharashtra, India
- Genres: Soundtracks; Natyageet; Classical music Jingles
- Occupations: Music composer, singer
- Years active: 1996–present
- Website: Official Website

Kaushal S. Inamdar (born 2 October 1971) is an Indian music composer and singer in Marathi and Hindi movies. His work in music spans from composing music for films, television, drama to events, concerts in Hindi and Marathi, composing music for ballets, advertisements, and also albums. He is currently settled at Goregaon, a Mumbai suburb.

== Early life ==
Kaushal did his schooling from IES Modern English School, Dadar and Billimoria High School, Panchgani. Thereafter he graduated from the D. G. Ruparel College, Mumbai, where he came in contact with Chetan Datar who initiated him into theatre. While in school, he had taken some primary lessons from Kamalakar Bhagwat, a renowned music composer himself, but he began learning the finer nuances of music composition only after he finished graduation concentrated on writing and music. He did writing apprentice under Lekh Tandon and also had a short stint as a writer in television soaps. As he found himself more of a natural musician, he settled with music as his creative career. His Guru, Pt. Satyasheel Deshpande, an eminent Hindustani vocalist and musicologist is known for his insightful study of North Indian Classical music.

== Musical associations ==
Kaushal has collaborated with singers and musicians. Kaushal has worked with Shankar Mahadevan,Satyasheel Deshpande,Sadhana Sargam, Suresh Wadkar, Shreya Ghoshal, Mahalaxmi Iyer, Raghunandan Panshikar, Shubha Joshi, Ninad Kamath, Sanjeev Chimmalgi, Hamsika Iyer, Swanand Kirkire, Ravindra Sathe, Shilpa Pai, Sonali Karnik, Shobha Joshi, Karsan Sagathia, Kirti Sagathia and Sanjeevani Bhelande, among others.

Kaushal has been one of the mentors for the program Idea Saregamapa on Zee Marathi.

== Personal life ==
Kaushal is married to Suchitra Inamdar. She has a M.A. degree in psychology and works as a psychotherapist having her own practice in Malad West. Kaushal and Suchitra have a son, Anurag Inamdar.

== Works ==
- Music for the Official CD ROM – Miss World 1996 in Bangalore, India
- Composed a song for 'Celebrating India' which was performed by greats like Pt. Satish Vyas (santoor), Pt. Bhavani Shankar (pakhawaj), Kala Ramnath (violin), Purbayan Chatterjee] (sitar), Pt. Rupak Kulkarni (flute), Sanjeev Chimmalgi] (vocals) at the Gateway of India, 2003
- Composed the invocation song for the opening ceremony of the Mumbai Festival, which was sung by 63 school-children in January 2005
- Recreated 'Bilhan', a musical by Mangesh Padgaonkar & P. L. Deshpande after a gap of 50 years
- 'Gaganzhula', a programme based on new Marathi music and choreography
- 'Rain Raga' – a fusion concert on the rains with Louiz Banks, George Brooks, Rupak Kulkarni, Sanjeev Chimmalgi, Hamsika Iyer, Gino Banks, Sheldon D'Silva, Vinayak Netke, Ravindra Chary, and Rafique Ahmed. Produced by Pancham Nishad Creatives.
- The Marathi Abhimaangeet is perhaps Kaushal's most famous work till date. Kaushal was inspired to work on this song after he was told that playing Marathi music on FM radio in Mumbai is considered downmarket. This song is sung by 112 eminent and well-known singers and 300+ chorus singers.

== Filmography ==
Feature Films
Year	Name of the Film	Director
2000	Krishnakathchi Meera	Gajendra Ahire
2001	Not Only Mrs. Raut	Gajendra Ahire
2001	Aag	Shiv Kadam
2004	Adhantari	Subhash Phadke
2005	Raasta Roko	Devashish Shedge
2007	It's Breaking News	Vishal Inamdar
2010	Hungama	Rohan Shivalkar
2010	Balgandharva	Ravi Jadhav
2011	Raja Shivchhatrapati	Nitin Chandrakant Desai
2011	Ajintha	Nitin Chandrakant Desai
2013	Sanshay Kallol	Vishal Inamdar
2013	Pitruroon	Nitish Bharadwaj
2014	Yellow	Mahesh Limaye
2015	Rangaa Patangaa	Prasad Namjoshi
2017	Ubuntu	Pushkar Shrotri
2021	Photo Prem	Aditya Rathi
2023	Teen Adkun Sitaram	Hrishikesh Joshi

== Discography ==
- Shubhra Kalya Moothbhar – based on the poetry of Late Smt. Shanta Shelke

Singers – Pt. Satyasheel Deshpande, Sadhana Sargam, Ranjana Jogalekar, etc.

- Ratra Bhizali – songs of the night

Singers – Shankar Mahadevan, Mahalaxmi Iyer, Sameer Date, etc.

- Geetecha to saakshi vadala – a translation of Shri Nagaraja Rao's poem – 'The Geeta's Witness'

Artsite – Shri Vidyadhar Gokhale.

- Bhavanjali – a devotional Hindi Album based on the philosophy of Swami Samarth Ramdas

Rendered by famous classical vocalist, Shri Raghunandan Panshikar

- Kamana Purti – an album for Sony Music, rendered by Sanjeev Chimmalgi.
- Man Pakharache Hoi – Milind Gunaji's poems set to tune.
- Chaphyache Shimpan – an album composed by Kaushal S. Inamdar, with songs rendered by Sonali Karnik.
- Jaanvee - an album composed by Kaushal Inamdar, with songs rendered by Jaanvee Prabhu Arora.
