= Satyasheel Deshpande =

Indian classical singer (born 1951)

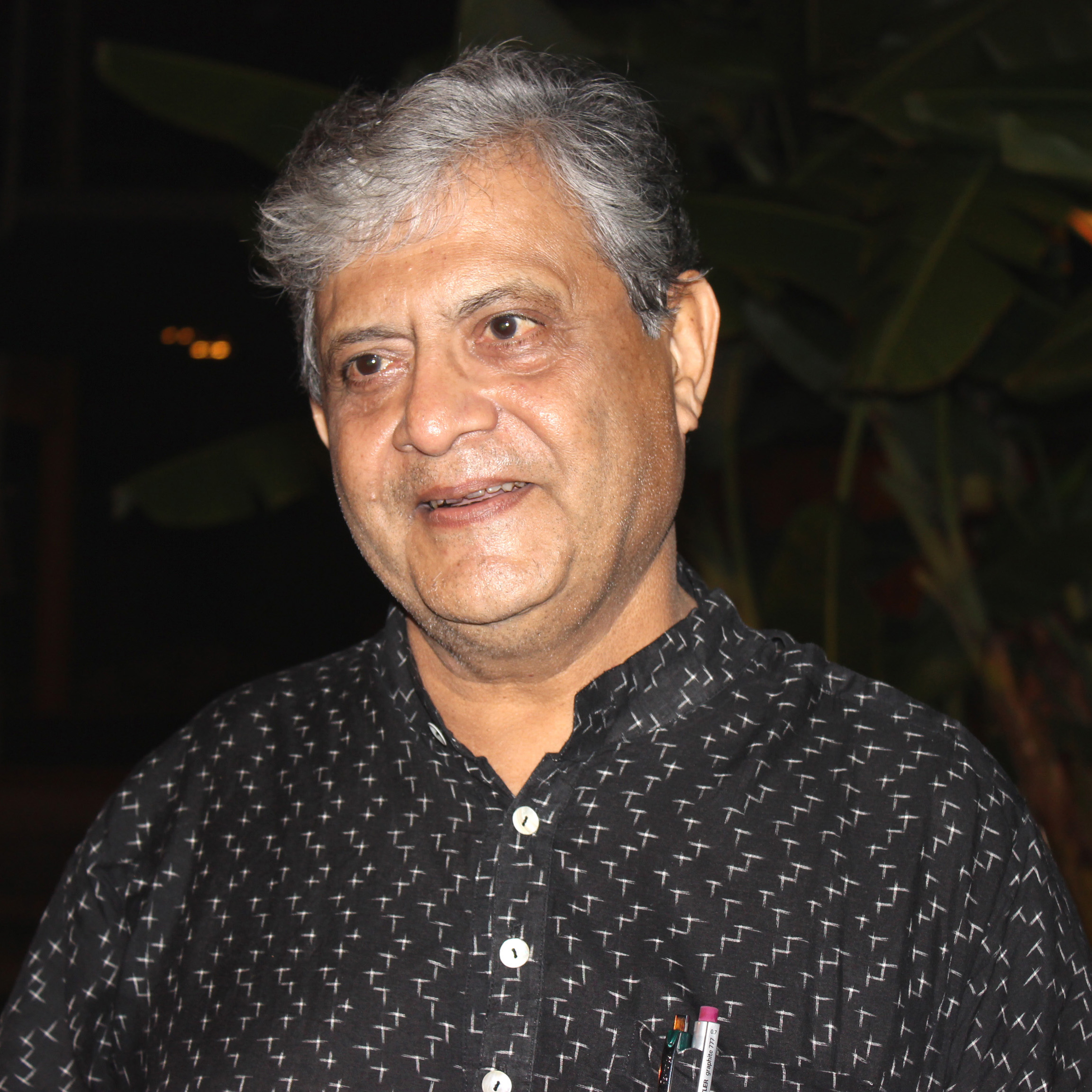
- Performing at [Madhya Pradesh] Tribal Museum Bhopal September 2015

Background information
- Born: Satyasheel Vaman Deshpande; 9 January 1951 (age 75); Mumbai, India
- Genres: Indian classical, Hindustani
- Occupations: Singer, composer, musicologist, author, archivist
- Instrument: Singing
- Website: www.satyasheel.com

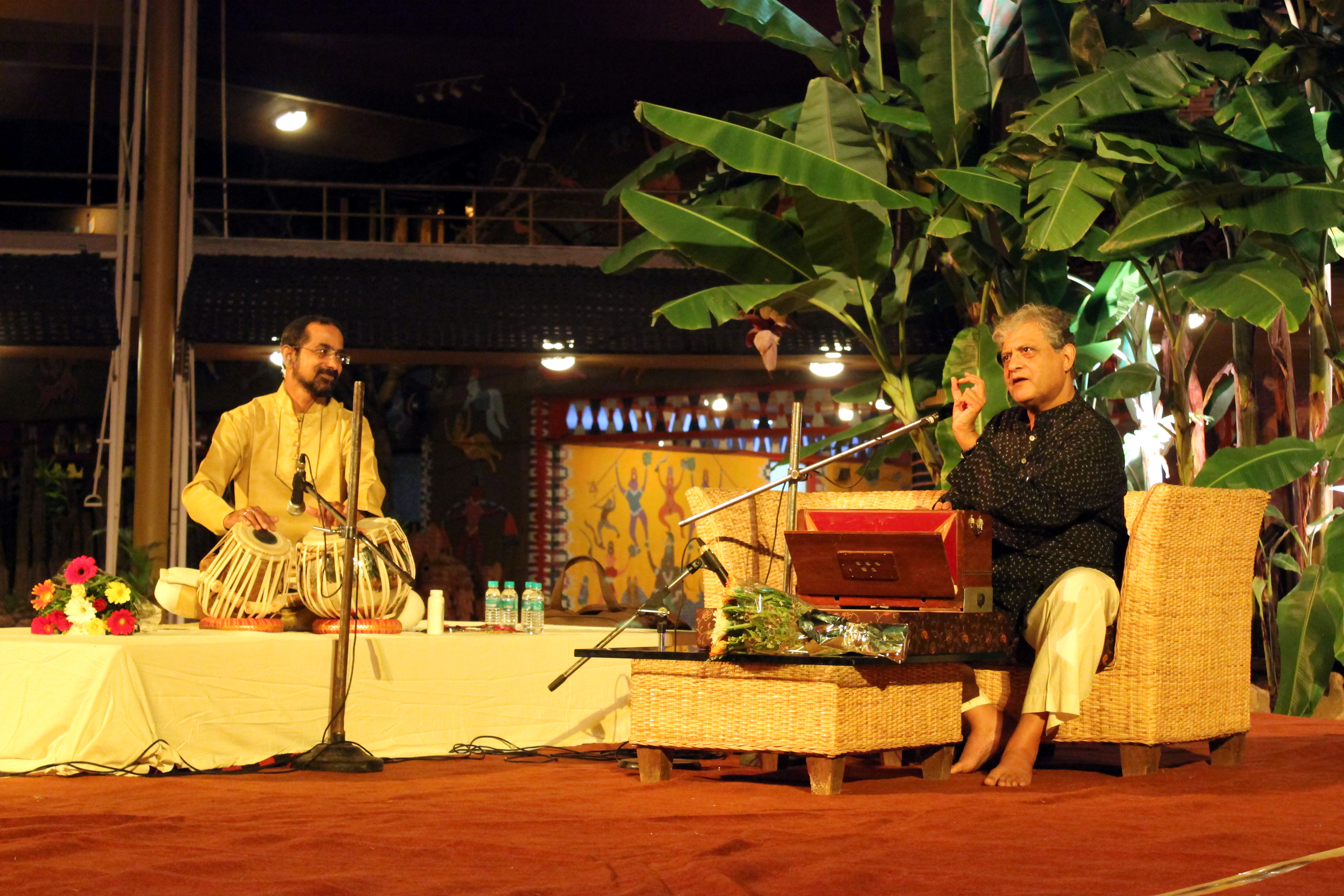
Performing at Madhya Pradesh Tribal Museum Bhopal September 2015

Pandit Satyasheel Deshpande (born 9 January 1951) is a Hindustani classical musician who specialises in singing Khayal. He is a disciple of Pandit Kumar Gandharva and the son of musicologist Vamanrao Deshpande.

== Career ==
Deshpande has been performing in music festivals and has also occasionally sung for Bollywood films. His most remembered performances being those in "Joothe Naina Bole" in Lekin... (1991) and "Man Anand Anand Chhayo" in Vijeta (1982), both duets with Asha Bhosle. Other films have seen him singing with Lata Mangeshkar. In 2010, he was also part of the 112 singers who sang the "Marathi Abhimaangeet".

Recently in February 2015, he created Five Minute Classical Music (FMCM) khayal piece for Prafulla Dahanukar Art Foundation. The project was launched for "people who don't have any prior experience of listening to Indian classical music" for a khayal usually last for 20–45 minutes.

Deshpande is also trainer of various notable artists like Pushkar Lele, Anand Thakore and Kaushal Inamdar.

== Albums ==
- 2004 - Kahen (produced by Dinanath Smruti Pratishthaan)
- 2007 – Thumri Katha – The Story of the Thumri (produced by Ninad)

=== The Samvaad Foundation ===
With the help of a Ford Foundation grant, Deshpande has established the Samvaad Foundation, at his residence in Mumbai where he has created a collection of Hindustani archives.

== Awards ==
Among the many awards Deshpande has received following awards:

- The Homi Bhabha Fellowship (presented by Homi Bhabha Fellowship Council in memory of Homi J. Bhabha)
- 2007 – Raza Award (presented in memory of artist S. H. Raza)
