= Asha Khadilkar =

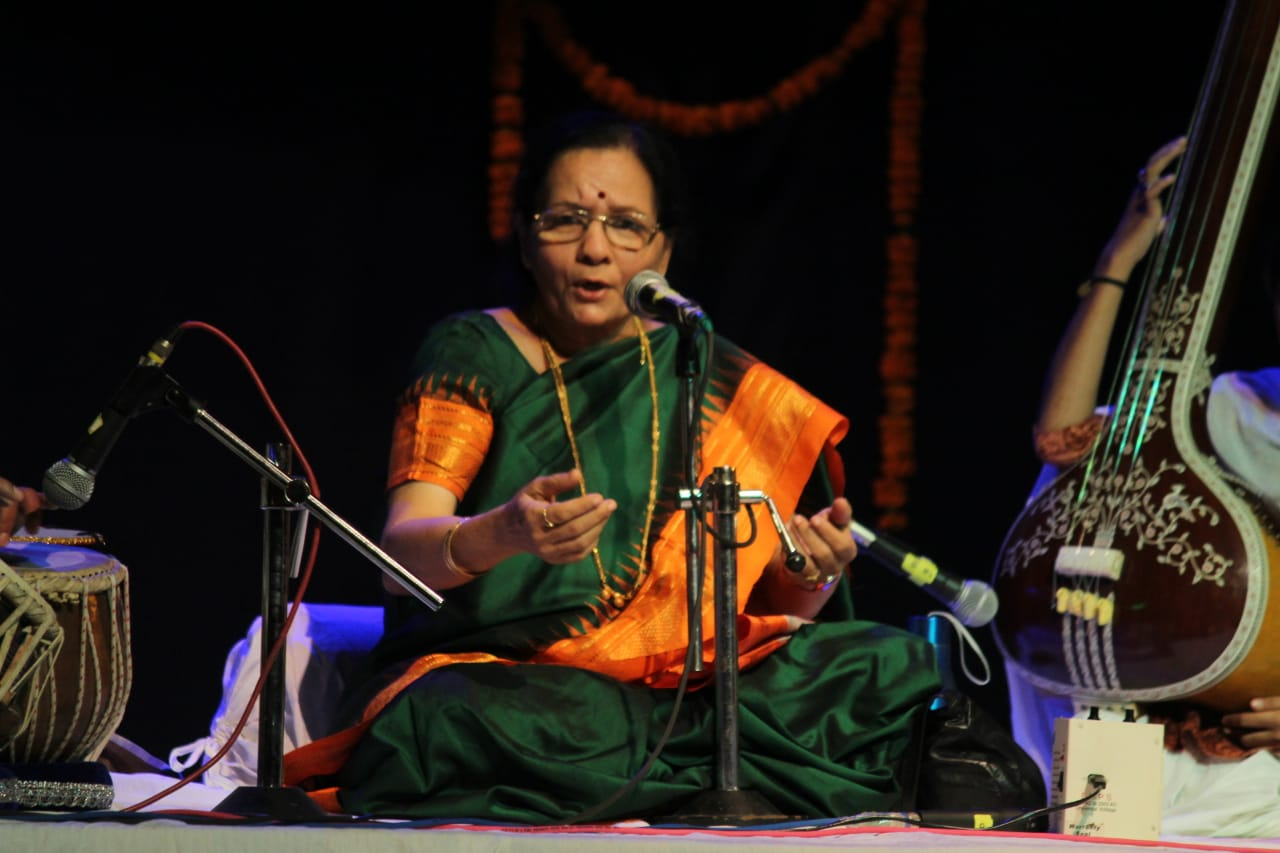

Background information
- Born: Asha Patankar; 11 January 1955 (age 70); Sangli
- Origin: Sangli
- Genres: Khyal, Bhajans, Thumris, Tarana, Bandish, Bhavageete, Natya Sangeet.
- Occupation: Hindustani Classical Music
- Years active: 1955–present
- Website: https://www.ashakhadilkar.com

Asha Khadilkar (born 11 January 1955) is a Mumbai, India-based Senior Vocalist who performs Indian (Hindustani) classical, semi-classical and devotional music including Natya Sangeet.

== Career ==
Khadilkar is a regular singer on All India Radio. Khadilkar has performed her private concerts on many occasions in United Kingdom, U.S.A., Canada and Singapore. Khadilkar has also provided music direction to 4 New Marathi Musicals (मराठी संगीत नाटक, Marathi Sangeet Natak ) produced by Nehru Center, Worli, Mumbai since Year 2000. She provides mentoring and guidance to advanced students of Indian Classical Music. Khadilkar, along with her husband Mr. Madhav Khadilkar runs Uttung Sansktutik Pariwar Trust, a non-profit organization devoted for preservation and proliferation of Indian Culture through various forms of Performing Arts, Literature, Nationalistic activities.

== Affiliation with Sa Re Ga Ma Pa ==
In 2008, Asha Khadilkar was invited as one of the celebrity judges for the Marathi vocal singing competition show called Idea Sa Re Ga Ma Pa, along with the music director Salil Kulkarni. This season featured adults who are in their mid-thirties and forties who pursued music as a hobby. The show was aptly named Sa Re Ga Ma Pa: Swapna Swaranche, Navatarunyache (स्वप्न स्वरांचे, नवतारुण्याचे), which roughly translates to Dreams of Music and New Youth.

== See also ==
- Jitendra Abhisheki
- Vasantrao Deshpande
- Manik Varma
