= Govindrao Patwardhan =

Govindrao Vitthal Patwardhan
- Born: 25 September 1925; Adur, Guhaghar
- Died: 31 January 1996 (aged 70)
- Genres: Hindustani classical music
- Occupations: Harmonium and Reed Organ Player
- Instruments: Harmonium and Organ

Govindrao Patwardhan (25 September 1925 – 31 January 1996) was a well-known harmonium and organ player.

== Early life ==
Patwardhan was born in the village of Adur near Guhagar in Konkan. His childhood was spent in Guhagar. He cherished a passion for music from his early childhood. He used to participate in the musicals and various program in his village. He had no formal education or training of playing the harmonium. After his basic education, he came to Mumbai and was working with Mumbai Police. He was staying in Girgaon. He had immense respect for Pandit Rambhau Marathe, Pandit Vasantrao Deshpande and Pandit Chota Gandharv and considered them as his Gurus.

== Career ==
Patwardhan contributed a lot in musical plays. He has played both the harmonium and the organ in various plays and concerts . He has played the harmonium in many Natyasangeets. He has played harmonium with Pandit Ram Marathe, Pandit Suresh Haldankar, Pandit Kumar Gandharv.

A lot of his recordings are available in the market

== Awards ==
A musical program with his name is being celebrated in Dombivli.

A short film about him was published in 2014 by Mehendale motion pictures.

== Personal details ==
Patwardhan was a very soft-spoken person. He used to work in the police department in Mumbai. He had a family in Girgaon.
