= List of Indian television actresses =

This is the list of notable Indian actresses appears in Indian television soap operas.

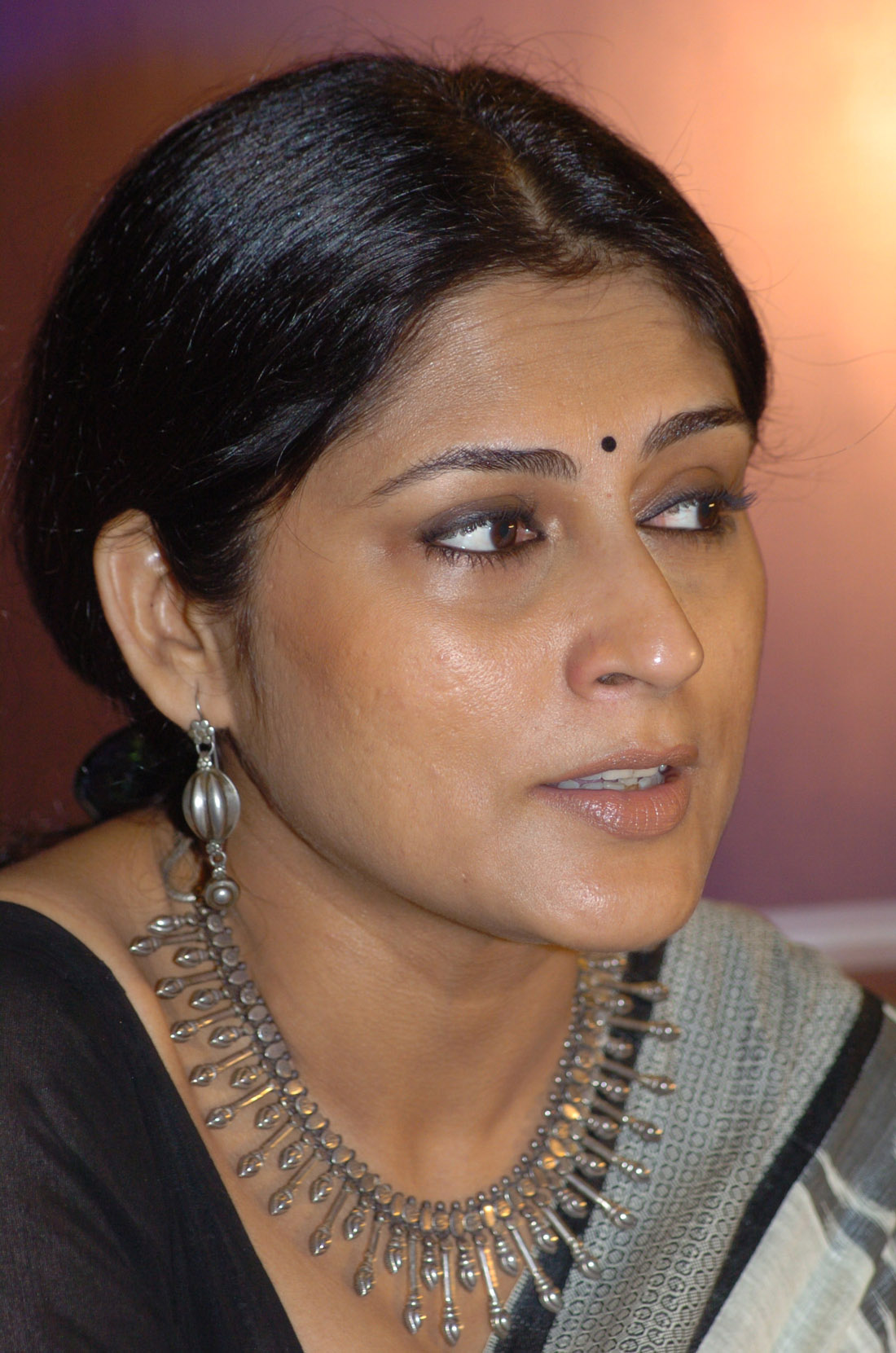
Hindi: Roopa Ganguly

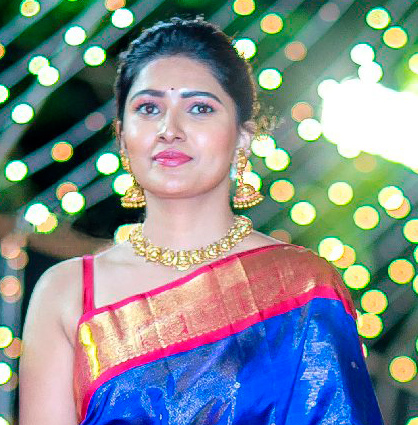
Tamil: Vani Bhojan

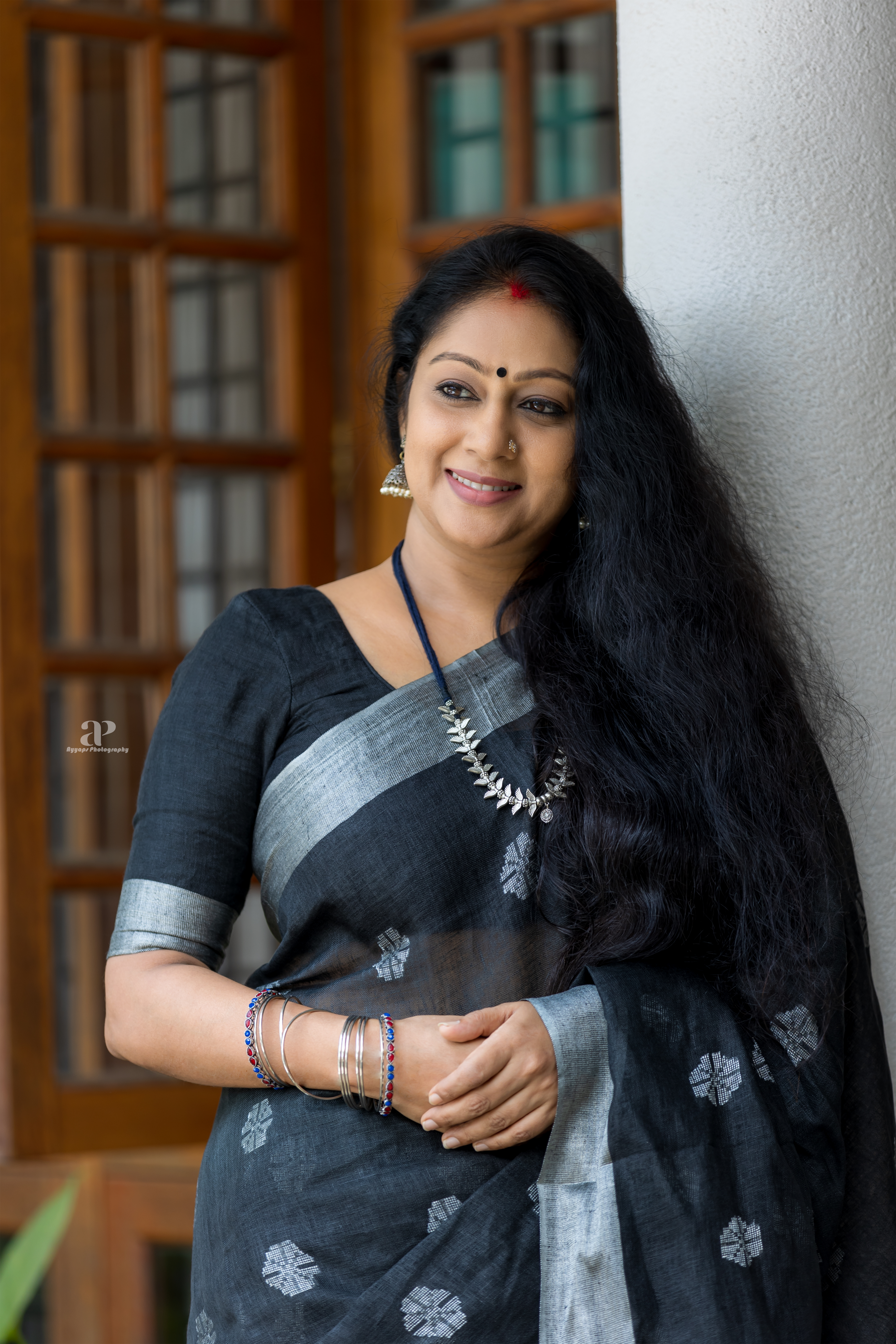
Malayalam: Chippy Renjith

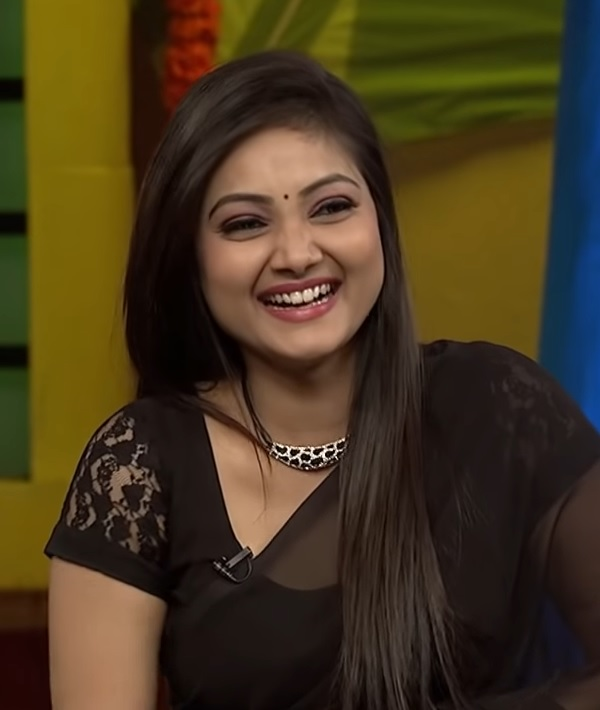
Telugu: Priyanka Nalkari

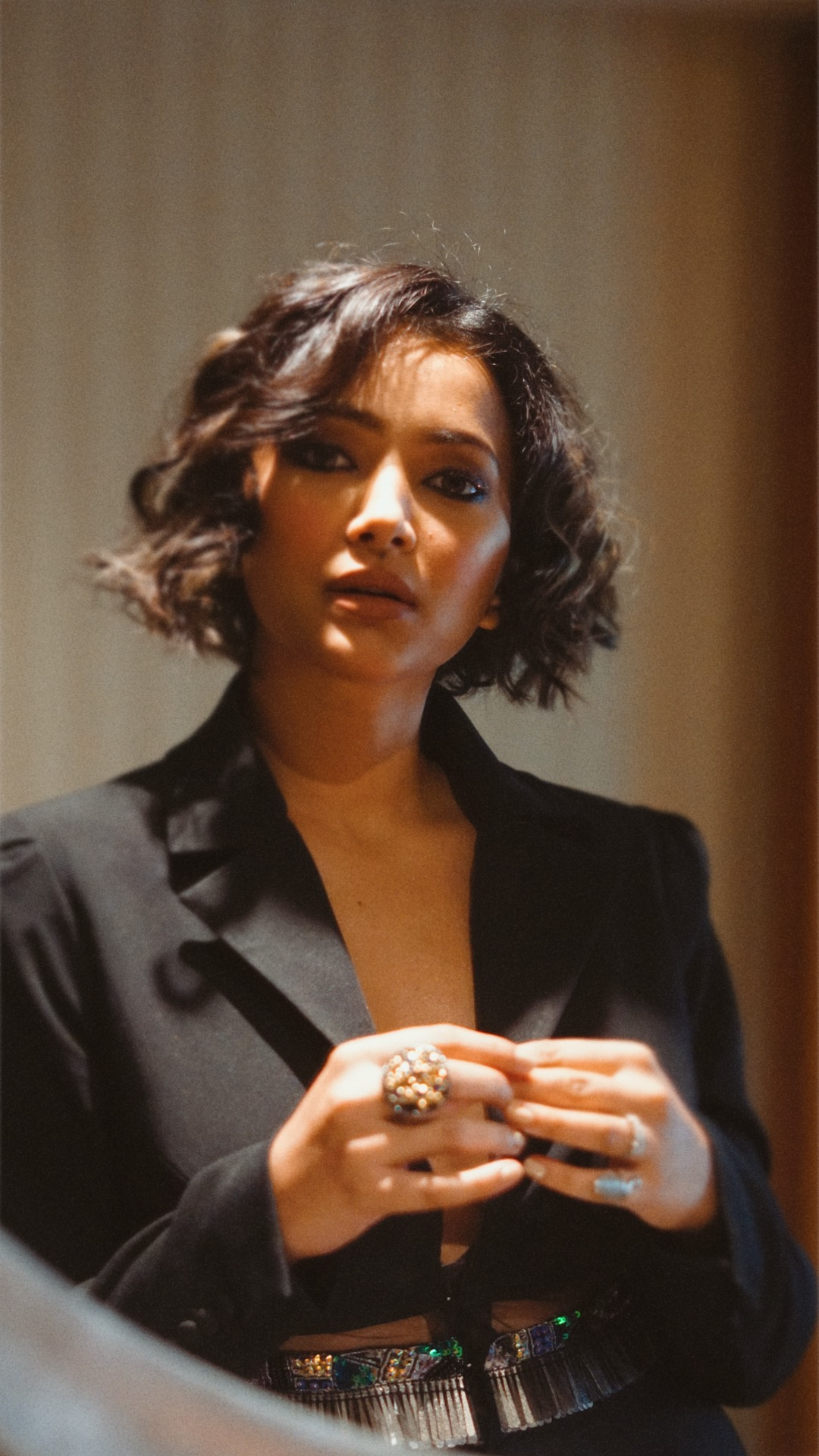
Kannada: Shweta Basu Prasad

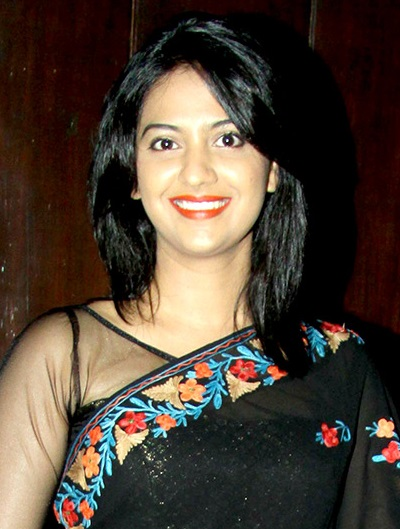
Marathi: Tejashri Pradhan

Television actresses are female actors who perform in television shows, serials, and reality shows. These actresses portray various characters in fictional stories, dramas, or other TV formats, contributing to the entertainment industry. They can be involved in a range of genres, including soap operas, sitcoms, thrillers, and reality shows.

== Hindi ==
Years active	Name	Known for
2012–present	Aakanksha Singh	Na Bole Tum Na Maine Kuch Kaha
2001–present	Aamna Sharif	Kahiin to Hoga; Hongey Judaa Na Hum; Kasautii Zindagii Kay
2010–present	Aanchal Munjal	Parvarish
2002–present	Aashka Goradia	Kkusum; Kyunki Saas Bhi Kabhi Bahu Thi; Kahiin To Hoga; Virrudh
2009–present	Aasiya Kazi	Bandini; Balika Vadhu
2012–present	Aalisha Panwar	Begusarai; Ishq Mein Marjawan; Meri Gudiya; Teri Meri Ikk Jindri; Kumkum Bhagya
2008–present	Abigail Jain	Humse Hai Liife
1994–present	Achint Kaur	Jamai Raja; Dhadkan; Kyunki Saas Bhi Kabhi Bahu Thi; Kahaani Ghar Ghar Kii
2009–present	Adaa Khan	Amrit Manthan; Behenein; Naagin; Vish Ya Amrit: Sitara; Fear Factor: Khatron Ke Khiladi 10
2000–present	Addite Shirwaikar	Shararat; Miilee
2008–present	Additi Gupta	Kis Desh Mein Hai Meraa Dil
2006–present	Aditi Bhatia	Yeh Hai Mohabbatein; Tujh Sang Preet Lagai Sajna (2008 TV series); Comedy Circus; Khatra Khatra Khatra
2014– present	Aditi Rathore	Naamkarann; Kumkum Bhagya; Ek Duje Ke Vaaste
2004–present	Aditi Dev Sharma	India's Best Cinestars Ki Khoj; Gangaa; Silsila Badalte Rishton Ka; Katha Ankahee
2018–present	Aditi Sharma	Kaleerein; Rabb Se Hai Dua; Yehh Jadu Hai Jinn Ka!
2014–present	Aishwarya Khare	Yeh Hai Chahatein; Bhagya Lakshmi
2010–present	Aishwarya Sakhuja	Saas Bina Sasural
2010–present	Akanksha Juneja	Mann Kee Awaaz Pratigya; Savdhaan India; Saath Nibhaana Saathiya 2
2016–present	Alice Kaushik	Pandya Store; Kahaan Hum Kahaan Tum
2002–present	Amrapali Gupta	Teen Bahuraniyaan; Kashmakash Zindagi Ki; Qubool Hai
2011–present	Amrita Mukherjee	Bade Achhe Lagte Hain; Kyun Utthe Dil Chhod Aaye
2012–present	Aneri Vajani	Nisha Aur Uske Cousins; Beyhadh; Anupama
2011–present	Anchal Sahu	Barrister Babu; Kyun Utthe Dil Chhod Aaye; Parineetii (TV series)
2018–present	Anjali Tatrari	Mere Dad Ki Dulhan; Tere Bina Jiya Jaye Na; Vanshaj
2007–present	Ankita Bhargava	Kesar; Dill Mill Gayye
2001– present	Anita Hassanandani	Kkavyanjali; Yeh Hai Mohabbatein; Naagin 3
2009–present	Ankita Lokhande	Jhalak Dikhhla Jaa; Pavitra Rishta
2009–present	Ankita Sharma	Baat Hamari Pakki Hai; Chakravartin Ashoka Samrat
2011–present	Ankitta Sharma	Lajwanti; Yeh Vaada Raha (TV series); Ek Shringaar-Swabhiman
2009–present	Ansha Sayed	CID
1997–present	Antara Biswas	Divya Drishti; Nazar; Namak Issk Ka
2010–present	Anupriya Kapoor	Tere Liye
2009–present	Anushka Sen	Baal Veer; Jhansi Ki Rani; Khatron Ke Khiladi 11
2013–present	Aparna Dixit	Yeh Dil Sun Raha Hai; Kalash – Ek Vishwaas; Woh Toh Hai Albelaa
2008–present	Arti Singh	Waaris; Uttaran; Bigg Boss 13
2010–present	Asha Negi	Pavitra Rishta; Bade Achhe Lagte Hain
2015–present	Ashi Singh	Yeh Un Dinon Ki Baat Hai; Aladdin – Naam Toh Suna Hoga; Meet: Badlegi Duniya Ki Reet
2009–present	Ashnoor Kaur	Na Bole Tum Na Maine Kuch Kaha; Yeh Rishta Kya Kehlata Hai; Patiala Babes
2011–present	Asmita Sood	Phir Bhi Na Maane...Badtameez Dil
2008–present	Avika Gor	Khatron Ke Khiladi; Balika Vadhu; Sasural Simar Ka
2010–present	Avneet Kaur	Dance India Dance Li'l Masters; Ek Mutthi Aasmaan; Chandra Nandini; Aladdin – Naam Toh Suna Hoga
2018–present	Amandeep Sidhu	Paramavatar Shri Krishna; Naagin 6; Chashni
2004–present	Barkha Bisht	Naamkarann
1997–present	Benaf Dadachandji	Baa Bahoo Aur Baby
2011–present	Chahat Khanna	Bade Achhe Lagte Hain
2016–present	Chahat Pandey	Nath; Durga Mata Ki Chhaya; Dwarkadheesh Bhagwan Shree Krishn – Sarvkala Sampann
2011–present	Chhavi Pandey	Ek Boond Ishq; Silsila Pyaar Ka
2009–present	Charlie Chauhan	Kaisi Yeh Yaariaan; Best Friends Forever?
2004–present	Dalljiet Kaur	Iss Pyaar Ko Kya Naam Doon?; Kaala Teeka; Qayamat Ki Raat
2003–present	Debina Bonnerjee	Ramayan (2008)
2011–present	Deblina Chatterjee	Sajda Tere Pyaar Mein; Balika Vadhu
2016–present	Debattama Saha	Ishaaron Ishaaron Mein; Shaurya Aur Anokhi Ki Kahani; Mithai
1987 –	Deepika Chikhalia	Ramayan (1987)
2011–present	Deepika Singh	Diya Aur Baati Hum
2011–present	Devoleena Bhattacharjee	Saath Nibhaana Saathiya; Bigg Boss 13
2013–present	Dharti Bhatt	Kya Haal, Mr. Paanchal?
2002–present	Digangana Suryavanshi	Ek Veer Ki Ardaas...Veera
2009–present	Dipika Kakar	Sasural Simar Ka; Sasural Simar Ka 2; Kahaan Hum Kahaan Tum; Bigg Boss 12
2012–present	Disha Parmar	Pyaar Ka Dard Hai Meetha Meetha Pyaara Pyaara; Bade Achhe Lagte Hain 2; Woh Apna Sa; Bade Achhe Lagte Hain 3
1997–present	Disha Vakani	Taarak Mehta Ka Ooltah Chashmah
2015–present	Divya Agarwal	Ragini MMS: Returns; MTV Ace of Space; MTV Splitsvilla; Bigg Boss OTT
2003–present	Divyanka Tripathi	Yeh Hai Mohabbatein; Banoo Main Teri Dulhann; Nach Baliye 8; Fear Factor: Khatron Ke Khiladi 11
2015–present	Donal Bisht	Ek Deewaana Tha; Roop – Mard Ka Naya Swaroop
2007–present	Drashti Dhami	Madhubala – Ek Ishq Ek Junoon; Geet – Hui Sabse Parayi; Jhalak Dikhhla Jaa 6; Pardes Mein Hai Mera Dil; Silsila Badalte Rishton Ka
2015–present	Eisha Singh	Ishq Ka Rang Safed; Ishq Subhan Allah; Ek Tha Raja Ek Thi Rani
2012–present	Ekta Kaul	Rab Se Sohna Isshq; Mere Angne Mein
2016–present	Erica Fernandes	Kuch Rang Pyar Ke Aise Bhi; Kasautii Zindagii Kay 2
2010–present	Eva Grover	Bade Achhe Lagte Hain
2010–present	Falaq Naaz	Sasural Simar Ka
2010–present	Fenil Umrigar	Best Friends Forever
1998–present	Gauri Pradhan	Kutumb; Kyunki Saas Bhi Kabhi Bahu Thi
2000–present	Gautami Kapoor	Kehta Hai Dil
2002–present	Geetanjali Tikekar	Kasautii Zindagii Kay (2001)
2010–present	Giaa Manek	Saath Nibhaana Saathiya; Jeannie Aur Juju
2011–present	Gulki Joshi	Phir Subah Hogi; Nadaan Parindey Ghar Aaja; Maddam Sir
1995–present	Gurdeep Kohli	Sanjivani (2002); Kasamh Se; Best of Luck Nikki; Vanshaj
2010–present	Helly Shah	Alaxmi Ka Super Parivaar; Devanshi; Swaragini – Jodein Rishton Ke Sur; Sufiyana Pyaar Mera; Ishq Mein Marjawan 2
2008–present	Hiba Nawab	Jijaji Chhat Per Hain; Bhaag Bakool Bhaag
2010–present	Himanshi Khurana	Bigg Boss 13
2009–present	Hina Khan	Yeh Rishta Kya Kehlata Hai; Bigg Boss 11; Kasautii Zindagii Kay 2
2009–present	Jannat Zubair Rahmani	Phulwa; Matti Ki Banno; Tu Aashiqui; Aap Ke Aa Jane Se; Fear Factor: Khatron Ke Khiladi 12
2007–present	Janvi Chheda	CID
2011–present	Jasmin Bhasin	Tashan-e-Ishq; Dil Se Dil Tak; Fear Factor: Khatron Ke Khiladi 9; Naagin 4; Bigg Boss 14
2010–present	Jayshree Soni	
2011–present	Jayashree Venketaramanan	Na Bole Tum Na Maine Kuch Kaha 2; Beend Banoongaa Ghodi Chadhunga
2008–present	Jennifer Mistry Bansiwal	Taarak Mehta Ka Ooltah Chashmah
1997–present	Jennifer Winget	Saraswatichandra; Beyhadh; Bepannah
2014–present	Jigyasa Singh	Thapki Pyar Ki; Shakti – Astitva Ke Ehsaas Ki
1998–present	Juhi Parmar	Kumkum – Ek Pyara Sa Bandhan; Karmaphal Daata Shani; Bigg Boss 5; Hamari Wali Good News
1996–present	Kamya Panjabi	Banoo Main Teri Dulhann; Shakti – Astitva Ke Ehsaas Ki
2000–present	Karishma Tanna	MTV Love School; Bigg Boss 8; Kyunki Saas Bhi Kabhi Bahu Thi; Qayamat Ki Raat; Fear Factor: Khatron Ke Khiladi 10
2012–present	Ketki Kadam	Qubool Hai; Mahabharat (2013); Rang Jaun Tere Rang Mein
2015–present	Kanika Mann	Badho Bahu; Guddan Tumse Na Ho Payega
2017–present	Kaveri Priyam	Yeh Rishtey Hain Pyaar Ke; Ziddi Dil Maane Na; Dil Diyaan Gallaan
2017–present	Kavita Lad	Char Divas Sasuche
2002–present	Keerti Gaekwad Kelkar	Sasural Simar Ka
2010–present	Keerti Nagpure	Parichay; Desh Ki Beti Nandini
2000–present	Kiran Dubey	Kyunki Saas Bhi Kabhi Bahu Thi; Kahaani Ghar Ghar Kii; Kkusum
1985 –	Kiran Juneja	Buniyaad; Mahabharat (1988)
1997–present	Kishwer Merchant	Kaisi Yeh Yaariaan; Bigg Boss; Pyaar Kii Ye Ek Kahaani
2007–present	Kratika Sengar	Jhansi Ki Rani (2009); Punar Vivaah; Kasam Tere Pyaar Ki
2014–present	Krissann Barretto	Kaisi Yeh Yaariaan; Ishqbaaaz
2007–present	Kritika Kamra	Kitani Mohabbat Hai; Kuch Toh Log Kahenge
2007–present	Krystle D'Souza	Ek Hazaaron Mein Meri Behna Hai
2003–present	Lavina Tandon	Jodha Akbar
2009–present	Leena Jumani	Kumkum Bhagya
2011–present	Loveleen Kaur Sasan	Saath Nibhaana Saathiya
1988–present	Lubna Salim	Mariam Khan – Reporting Live
2007–present	Madhurima Tuli	Chandrakanta (2017 TV series); Kumkum Bhagya; Nach Baliye
2015–present	Madirakshi Mundle	Siya Ke Ram
2006–present	Mahii Vij	Laagi Tujhse Lagan
2008–present	Mahima Makwana	Sapne Suhane Ladakpan Ke; Mariam Khan – Reporting Live
2001–present	Manasi Salvi	Pyaar Ka Dard Hai Meetha Meetha Pyaara Pyaara
2008–present	Mansi Parekh	Sumit Sambhal Lega
2012–present	Mansi Srivastava	Ishqbaaaz; Divya Drishti
2011–present	Mayuri Deshmukh	Imlie
2014–present	Meera Deosthale	Udaan
2014–present	Megha Chakraborty	Kaatelal & Sons; Imlie
2003–present	Mona Singh	Jassi Jaissi Koi Nahin
1997–present	Moonmoon Banerjee	Kasautii Zindagii Kay (2001); Kuch Rang Pyar Ke Aise Bhi
1999–present	Mouli Ganguly	Kaahin Kissii Roz
2007–present	Mouni Roy	Naagin; Do Saheliyaan; Devon Ke Dev...Mahadev; Jhalak Dikhhla Jaa 7
1985–present	Mrinal Kulkarni	Son Pari; Astitva...Ek Prem Kahani
2012–present	Mrunal Thakur	Kumkum Bhagya
2006–present	Mugdha Chaphekar	Dharti Ka Veer Yodha Prithviraj Chauhan; Kumkum Bhagya; Satrangi Sasural
2004–present	Munmun Dutta	Taarak Mehta Ka Ooltah Chashmah
2014– present	Nalini Negi	
2011–present	Navina Bole	Ishqbaaaz; Miley Jab Hum Tum
2007–present	Nazea Hasan Sayed	Mahabharat; Lockdown Ki Love Story
2012–present	Neha Lakshmi Iyer	Qubool Hai; Ishqbaaaz
2005– present	Neha Marda	Doli Armaano Ki
2001–present	Neha Mehta	Taarak Mehta Ka Ooltah Chashmah
2011–present	Neha Yadav	
2010–present	Nia Sharma	Ek Hazaaron Mein Meri Behna Hai; Jamai Raja; Ishq Mein Marjawan; Naagin 4
2002–present	Nigaar Khan	
2015–present	Nikita Dutta	Ek Duje Ke Vaaste; Dream Girl
2019–present	Nikki Tamboli	Bigg Boss 14; Fear Factor: Khatron Ke Khiladi 11
2019–present	Nimrit Ahluwalia	Choti Sarrdaarni
2009–present	Niti Taylor	Kaisi Yeh Yaariaan; Bade Achhe Lagte Hain; Ishqbaaaz
2016–present	Niyati Fatnani	Nazar
2009–present	Nyra Banerjee	Divya Drishti
2010–present	Ojaswi Oberoi	
2014–present	Palak Purswani	Badii Devrani; Bade Bhaiyya Ki Dulhania; Ek Aastha Aisi Bhee; Meri Hanikarak Biwi; Yeh Rishtey Hain Pyaar Ke
1999–present	Pallavi Kulkarni	Itna Karo Na Mujhe Pyaar
2004–present	Pallavi Subhash	Tumhari Disha; Karam Apnaa Apnaa; Kasamh Se; Aathvaan Vachan; Basera; Godh Bharaai; Mahabharat; Chakravartin Ashoka Samrat
2004–present	Panchi Bora	Kayamath
2014–present	Pankhuri Awasthy	Razia Sultan; Suryaputra Karn; Kya Qusoor Hai Amala Ka?; Yeh Rishta Kya Kehlata Hai
2010–present	Paridhi Sharma	Jodha Akbar; Patiala Babes
2004–present	Parineeta Borthakur	Swaragini – Jodein Rishton Ke Sur; Bepannah
2007–present	Parul Chauhan	Sapna Babul Ka...Bidaai
2004–present	Prachi Desai	Kasamh Se
2010–2016	Pratyusha Banerjee	Balika Vadhu
2005–present	Priya Marathe	Pavitra Rishta
2010–present	Priyal Gor	Ichhapyaari Naagin
2011–present	Pooja Banerjee	Kasautii Zindagii Kay (2018)
2008–present	Pooja Bose	Tujh Sang Preet Lagai Sajna; Devon Ke Dev...Mahadev; Dev (TV series)
2009–present	Pooja Gaur	Mann Kee Awaaz Pratigya
2012–present	Pooja Sharma	Mahabharat (2013); Mahakali – Anth Hi Aarambh Hai
1995–present	Poonam Narula	Kasautii Zindagii Kay (2001)
2014–present	Pranali Ghogare	Mere Rang Mein Rangne Waali; Rajaa Betaa
2018–present	Pranali Rathod	Yeh Rishta Kya Kehlata Hai; Barrister Babu; Kyun Utthe Dil Chhod Aaye
2013–present	Preetika Rao	Beintehaa; Love Ka Hai Intezaar
2005–present	Rachitha Mahalakshmi	Pirivom Santhippom
2014–present	Radhika Madan	Meri Aashiqui Tum Se Hi
2008–present	Ragini Khanna	Sasural Genda Phool
2007–present	Ragini Nandwani	Mrs. Kaushik Ki Paanch Bahuein
2005–present	Rajshree Thakur	Saat Phere – Saloni Ka Safar
2000–present	Rakshanda Khan	Naagin 3; Jassi Jaissi Koi Nahin; Kyunki Saas Bhi Kabhi Bahu Thi
2005–present	Rashami Desai	Pari Hoon Main; Uttaran; Dil Se Dil Tak; Bigg Boss 13; Naagin 4
2008– Present	Ratan Rajput	Agle Janam Mohe Bitiya Hi Kijo; Santoshi Maa
1985 –	Ratna Pathak	Sarabhai vs Sarabhai
2006– present	Rati Pandey	Miley Jab Hum Tum; Hitler Didi; Begusarai; Shaadi Mubarak
2010–present	Reem Shaikh	Chakravartin Ashoka Samrat; Tujhse Hai Raabta
1985–2017	Reema Lagoo	Shrimaan Shrimati; Tu Tu Main Main
	Reena Kapoor	Woh Rehne Waali Mehlon Ki
1992–present	Resham Tipnis	Sahib Biwi Aur Boss; Satrangi Sasural
2014–present	Reyhna Malhotra	Ishqbaaaz; Dil Boley Oberoi; Kumkum Bhagya
2007–present	Ridhi Dogra	Maryada: Lekin Kab Tak?; Woh Apna Sa
2014–present	Rhea Sharma	Yeh Rishtey Hain Pyaar Ki; Tu Sooraj Main Saanjh, Piyaji
	Rinku Karmarkar	Na Bole Tum Na Maine Kuch Kaha; Yeh Vaada Raha
2007–present	Roopal Tyagi	Sapne Suhane Ladakpan Ke; Bigg Boss 9
2012–present	Roop Durgapal	Balika Vadhu; Kuch Rang Pyar Ke Aise Bhi
1988–present	Roopa Ganguly	Mahabharat (1988)
2012–present	Roshni Walia	
2008–present	Rubina Dilaik	Chotti Bahu; Saas Bina Sasural; Devon Ke Dev...Mahadev; Bigg Boss 14; Shakti – Astitva Ke Ehsaas Ki
2009–present	Rucha Hasabnis	Saath Nibhaana Saathiya
2012–present	Ruhanika Dhawan	Yeh Hai Mohabbatein
2007–present	Rupali Bhosale	Badi Dooooor Se Aaye Hai
2000–present	Rupali Ganguly	Sarabhai vs Sarabhai; Sanjivani (2002); Parvarrish – Kuchh Khattee Kuchh Meethi; Anupamaa
1998 – 2004	Seema Shinde	Mohandas B.A.L.L.B.
1996–present	Sakshi Tanwar	Kahaani Ghar Ghar Kii; Bade Achhe Lagte Hain; 24 (season 2)
2022–present	Samridhii Shukla	Saavi Ki Savaari; Yeh Rishta Kya Kehlata Hai
1995–present	Sana Amin Sheikh	Gustaakh Dil; Nazar
2016–present	Samiksha Jaiswal	Zindagi Ki Mehek; Bahu Begum
2010–present	Sana Makbul	Iss Pyaar Ko Kya Naam Doon?; Khatron Ke Khiladi 11
2015–present	Sana Sayyad	Divya Drishti; Lockdown Ki Love Story; Spy Bahu; Kundali Bhagya
2006–present	Sanaya Irani	Iss Pyaar Ko Kya Naam Doon?; Rangrasiya; Miley Jab Hum Tum
1986–present	Sangita Ghosh	Des Mein Niklla Hoga Chand; Divya Drishti
2003–present	Sanjeeda Sheikh	Kyaa Hoga Nimmo Kaa; Kayamath; Ek Hasina Thi; Kya Dil Mein Hai; Nach Baliye 3
2007–present	Sara Khan	Sapna Babul Ka...Bidaai
2017–present	Sargun Kaur	Kaal Bhairav Rahasya; Tantra; Yeh Hai Chahatein
2009–present	Sargun Mehta	12/24 Karol Bagh; Phulwa; Balika Vadhu; Nach Baliye 6
1989–present	Sarita Joshi	Baa Bahoo Aur Baby
2006–present	Saumya Tandon	Bhabiji Ghar Par Hain!
2002–present	Sayantani Ghosh	Naaginn (2007); Naamkarann; Barrister Babu
2010–present	Shafaq Naaz	Mahabharat (2013)
2003–present	Shama Sikander	Ye Meri Life Hai
2007–present	Shamin Mannan	Sanskaar – Dharohar Apnon Ki
2003–present	Sheena Bajaj	Best of Luck Nikki; Jassi Jaissi Koi Nahin; Thapki Pyar Ki; Mariam Khan Reporting Live; Vanshaj
1999 – 2003	Sheetal Agashe	Yes Boss
2015–present	Shehnaaz Gill	Bigg Boss 13; Mujhe Shaadi Karoge
2014–present	Shivya Pathania	RadhaKrishn; Ram Siya Ke Luv Kush; Lakshmi Narayan – Sukh Samarthya Santulan; Shiv Shakti Tap Tyaag Tandav
2007–present	Shikha Singh Shah	Kumkum Bhagya
2006–present	Shilpa Anand	Dill Mill Gayye
2000–present	Shilpa Saklani	Kyunki Saas Bhi Kabhi Bahu Thi; Bigg Boss 7
1999–present	Shilpa Shinde	Bhabiji Ghar Par Hain!; Bigg Boss 11
2013–present	Shiny Doshi	Sarojini – Ek Nayi Pehal; Pandya Store
2013–present	Shivangi Joshi	Begusarai; Yeh Rishta Kya Kehlata Hai; Balika Vadhu 2; Fear Factor: Khatron Ke Khiladi 12; Barsatein – Mausam Pyaar Ka
2011–present	Shivani Surve	Jaana Na Dil Se Door; Devyani
2014–present	Shivya Pathania	RadhaKrishn; Humsafars; Ek Rishta Saajhedari Ka
2005–present	Shraddha Arya	Main Lakshmi Tere Aangan Ki; Kundali Bhagya; Tumhari Paakhi
2010–present	Shrenu Parikh	Iss Pyaar Ko Kya Naam Doon? Ek Baar Phir; Ishqbaaaz; Dil Boley Oberoi; Ek Bhram Sarvagun Sampanna; Maitree
2016–present	Srishti Jain	Suhani Si Ek Ladki; Meri Durga; Main Mayke Chali Jaungi; Hamari Wali Good News; Bade Achhe Lagte Hain 3
2011–present	Shritama Mukherjee	Dekha Ek Khwaab
2003–present	Shruti Seth	Shararat
2018–present	Shruti Sharma	Gathbandhan; Namak Issk Ka
1998–present	Shruti Ulfat	
2006–present	Shubhangi Atre	Bhabiji Ghar Par Hain!
2004–present	Shubhavi Choksey	Kyunki Saas Bhi Kabhi Bahu Thi; Kasautii Zindagii Kay
2000–present	Shweta Kawatra	Kahaani Ghar Ghar Kii
1999–present	Shweta Tiwari	Kasautii Zindagii Kay (2001); Begusarai; Parvarrish – Kuchh Khattee Kuchh Meethi; Bigg Boss 4; Ek Thhi Naayka; Mere Dad Ki Dulhan; Main Hoon Aparajita
1995–present	Simone Singh	Ek Hasina Thi
2001–present	Simple Kaul	Kutumb; Shararat
2014–present	Simran Pareenja	Bhagyalaxmi; Kaala Teeka
1998–present	Smita Bansal	Balika Vadhu
1998–present	Smriti Irani	Kyunki Saas Bhi Kabhi Bahu Thi
2009–present	Smriti Kalra	Suvreen Guggal – Topper of The Year
2009–present	Sneha Wagh	Jyoti; Ek Veer Ki Ardaas...Veera
2010–present	Sonali Nikam	
2011–present	Sonarika Bhadoria	Devon Ke Dev...Mahadev
2012–present	Sonia Balani	Bade Achhe Lagte Hain; Tu Mera Hero
2021	Sonia Rathee	Broken But Beautiful (Season 3, 10 episodes)
2007–present	Soumya Seth	Navya..Naye Dhadkan Naye Sawaal
2007–present	Sreejita Dey	Uttaran; Nazar
2006–present	Sriti Jha	Kumkum Bhagya; Dil Se Di Dua... Saubhagyavati Bhava?; Jyoti (TV series); Rakt sambandh; Balika Vadhu; Fear Factor: Khatron Ke Khiladi 12; Jhalak Dikhhla Jaa 10
2007–present	Srishty Rode	Yeh Ishq Haaye; Bigg Boss
2005–present	Suhasi Dhami	Yahan Main Ghar Ghar Kheli
2007–present	Sukirti Kandpal	Dill Mill Gayye; Pyaar Kii Ye Ek Kahaani; Dilli Wali Thakur Gurls; Story 9 Months Ki
2014–present	Sumbul Touqeer	Imlie; Kavya – Ek Jazbaa, Ek Junoon; Bigg Boss (Hindi season 16); Ravivaar With Star Parivaar; Ishaaron Ishaaron Mein; Waaris (2016 TV series); Chandragupta Maurya (2018 TV series)
1999–present	Sumona Chakravarti	Comedy Nights with Kapil; The Kapil Sharma Show; Bade Achhe Lagte Hain
2007–present	Sunayana Fozdar	Taarak Mehta Ka Ooltah Chashmah
1985–present	Supriya Pathak	Khichdi
1990–present	Supriya Pilgaonkar	Tu Tu Main Main; Kuch Rang Pyar Ke Aise Bhi; Sasural Genda Phool
2009–present	Supriya Kumari	Bairi Piya (TV series); Agle Janam Mohe Bitiya Hi Kijo; Looteri Dulhan
2012–present	Surbhi Jyoti	Qubool Hai; Pyaar Tune Kya Kiya; Naagin 3; Koi Laut Ke Aaya Hai
2014–present	Surbhi Chandna	Naagin (2015 TV series); Ishqbaaaz; Qubool Hai; Sanjivani; Sherdil Shergill
2005–present	Suzanne Bernert	Kasautii Zindagii Kay (2001); Chakravartin Ashoka Samrat
2016–present	Tanvi Dogra	Jiji Maa; Ek Bhram...Sarvagun Sampanna; Santoshi Maa – Sunayein Vrat Kathayein; Parineetii
2011–present	Tanya Sharma	Yeh Hai Aashiqui; Woh Apna Sa; Saath Nibhaana Saathiya; Sasural Simar Ka 2
2010–present	Tarana Raja	Bade Achhe Lagte Hain
2012–present	Tejasswi Prakash	Swaragini – Jodein Rishton Ke Sur; Silsila Badalte Rishton Ka; Fear Factor: Khatron Ke Khiladi 10; Bigg Boss 15; Naagin (2015 TV series)
2005–present	Tina Datta	Uttaran; Koi Aane Ko Hai; Fear Factor: Khatron Ke Khiladi 7; Bigg Boss 16; Hum Rahe Na Rahe Hum
2017–present	Tina Ann Philip	Ek Aastha Aisi Bhee
2007–present	Toral Rasputra	Balika Vadhu
2011–present	Tridha Choudhury	Dahleez
2022–present	Twinkle Arora	Udaariyaan; Jhanak
2006–present	Urmila Tiwari	Hum Ladkiyan; Pyaar Ka Dard Hai Meetha Meetha Pyaara Pyaara; Sajan Re Phir Jhoot Mat Bolo
1993–present	Urvashi Dholakia	Chandrakanta (2017 TV series); Kasautii Zindagii Kay (2001); Bigg Boss 6; Nach Baliye
2008– Present	Vaishnavi Dhanraj	CID; Bepannah
1998–present	Vaishnavi Mahant	Shaktimaan
1996–present	Vandana Pathak	Khichdi (2002); Hum Paanch; Saath Nibhaana Saathiya
2008–present	Vibha Anand	Balika Vadhu; Mahabharat (2013); Kaisi Yeh Yaariaan
2007–present	Vindhya Tiwari	Maryada: Lekin Kab Tak?
2007–present	Vinny Arora	Kasturi; Kuchh Is Tara
2010–present	Vahbbiz Dorabjee	Pyaar Kii Ye Ek Kahaani; Bahu Hamari Rajni Kant
2012–present	Vrushika Mehta	Dil Dostii Dance
2011–present	Yukti Kapoor	Agniphera; Siya Ke Ram; Maddam Sir; Keh Doon Tumhein

== Tamil ==
Years Active	Artist	Notable Work	Notes
1997–2023	Abitha	Thirumathi Selvam; Manikoondu; Adhiparasakthi; Ponnunjal; Muthaaram; Lakshmi Stores	
2016–2022	Abhirami Venkatachalam	Dance Jodi Dance Season 1; Star Wars; Bigg Boss Tamil season 3; Murattu Singles; BB Jodigal; Bigg Boss Ultimate season 1; Ninaithen Vandhai	
2018–present	Aishwarya Dutta	Bigg Boss Tamil season 2; Murattu Singles; BB Jodigal; Oo Solriya Oo Oohm Solriya; Top Cooku Dupe Cooku season 1	1st Runner Up of Bigg Boss Tamil season 2
1999–present	Aishwariyaa Bhaskaran	Thendral; Kurinji Malar; Azhagu; Jothi; Jamelaa	
2023–present	Akshaya Rao	Sandhya Raagam	
2015–present	Anila Sreekumar	Chinna Thambi; Kaatrin Mozhi; Siragadikka Aasai	
2018–present	Anitha Sampath	News7 Tamil; Vanakkam Tamizha; Bigg Boss Tamil season 4	
2017–present	Anjali Rao	Mahalakshmi; Thalayanai Pookal; Lakshmi Stores; Kanmani; Ninaithen Vandhai	
2009–present	Anuradha	Thangam; Deivamagal; Nenjam Marappathillai; Kalyana Parisu; Jothi; Chellamma; Kanda Naal Mudhal; Mr. Manaivi	
2015–present	Aranthangi Nisha	Kalakka Povathu Yaaru? Season 5; Mr. and Mrs. Chinnathirai; Bigg Boss Season 4; Bharathi Kannamma; Thendral Vandhu Ennai Thodum	
2000–present	Archana Chandhoke	Sa Re Ga Ma Pa Lil Champs; Sa Re Ga Ma Pa Seniors; Junior Super Star; Bigg Boss Tamil season 4	
2020–present	Archana Ravichandran	Raja Rani Season 2; Bigg Boss Tamil Season 7	Bigg Boss Tamil Season 7 Title Winner
2013–present	Ashwini Aanandita	Namma Veetu Ponnu; Thangamagal	
2017–present	Ayesha Zeenath	Maya; Ponmagal Vanthal; Sathya	
2014–present	Bavithra	Thamarai; Naam Iruvar Namakku Iruvar Season 2; Singapennae	
2014–present	Bhagyalakshmi	Kalyana Parisu; Kairasi Kudumbam; Azhagu; Kalyana Veedu; Siragadikka Aasai	
2011–2017	Bhavana Balakrishnan	Super Singer Junior; Jodi Number One	
2005–2017	Bhavani	Kalyanam; Abirami; Ilavarasi; Mundhanai Mudichu; Muthaaram; Valli; Deivamagal; Kalyana Parisu; Andal Azhagar	
2000–2015	Bhuvaneswari	Chithi; Thekkathi Ponnu; Pasamalar	
2003–2024	Bombay Gnanam	Kolanga; Chidambara Rahasiyam; Sahana; Ethirneechal	
2016–present	Chaitra Reddy	Kalyanam Mudhal Kadhal Varai; Yaaradi Nee Mohini; Kayal; Top Cooku Dupe Cooku season 1	
2020–2023	Chandini Tamilarasan	Rettai Roja	
2006–2016	Chandra Lakshman	Kolangal; Kadhalikka Neramillai; Magal; Pasamalar	
2011–2022	Chaya Singh	Run; Poove Unakkaga	
2017–2022	Chippy Renjith	Mouna Raagam; Mouna Raagam 2	
2013–2020	V. J. Chitra	Saravanan Meenatchi; Chinna Papa Periya Papa; Velunachi; Pandian Stores	
2002–present	Deepa Shankar	Kolangal; Vani Rani; Lakshmi Stores; Nachiyarpuram; Senthoora Poove; Meenakshi Ponnunga; Bharathi Kannamma 2; Seetha Raman; Top Cooku Dupe Cooku season 1	
1996–2010	Deepa Venkat	Kadhal Pagadai; Ramany vs Ramany; Chithi; Annamalai; Kolangal; Surya; Kasthuri	
2020–2023	Delna Davis	Roja; Anbe Vaa	
1997–2022	Devadarshini	Marmadesam; Chinna Papa Periya Papa; Ramany vs Ramany; Lakshmi; Idhayam; Athipookal	
2003–2023	Devayani	Kolangal; Muthaaram; Rasaathi; Pudhu Pudhu Arthangal	
2018–present	Dharsha Gupta	Avalum Naanum; Mullum Malarum; Minnale; Senthoora Poove; Cooku with Comali Season 2	
2019–present	Dhivya Duraisamy	Cooku with Comali season 5	
1999–2022	Dhivyadharshini	Koffee With DD; Anbudan DD; Ahalya; Kolangal; Arasi	
1998–2021	Dubbing Janaki	Akshaya; Pushpanjali; Vairanenjam; Athipookal; Senthoora Poove; Chandralekha; Pasamalar; Roja	
2014–present	Farina Azad	Azhagu; Bharathi Kannamma; Nachiyarpuram; Abhi Tailor; Cooku with Comali season 5; Idhayam	
1989–2022	Fathima Babu	Lakshmi; Yaaradi Nee Mohini; Aranmanai Kili; Bigg Boss Season 3	
2009–present	Gabriella Charlton	Eeramana Rojave 2; Marumagal	
2009–present	Gayathri Yuvraaj	Azhagi; Priyasaki; Aranmanai Kili; Chithi 2; Saravanan Meenatchi Season 3; Naam Iruvar Namakku Iruvar; Meenakshi Ponnunga	
2001–present	Gayatri Jayaraman	Nandini; Azhagu; Kayal; Valli Thirumanam; Thangamagal	
2018–present	Gomathi Priya	Velaikaran; Siragadikka Aasai	
2017–2024	Grace Karunas	Kalakka Povathu Yaaru? Champions; Cooku with Comali Season 3; Super Singer 10	
2011–present	Haripriya Isai	Kana Kaanum Kaalangal; Lakshmi Vandhachu; Kalyanam Mudhal Kadhal Varai; Priyamanaval; Saravanan Meenatchi season 3; Kanmani; Senthoora Poove; Thalattu; Ethirneechal	
1999–2015	Hemalatha	Chithi; Kana Kaanum Kaalangal; Jodi Number One; Thendral; Mundhanai Mudichu	
2009–present	Indraja	Aan Paavam; Bhairavi Aavigalukku Priyamanaval; Valli	
2006-2009; 2015–present	Jacquline Lydia	Kana Kaanum Kaalangal; Kalakka Povathu Yaaru? season 5; Thaenmozhi B.A; Bigg Boss Tamil season 8	
2004–present	Jangiri Madhumitha	Athipookal; Azhagi; Madipakkam Madhavan; Chinna Papa Periya Papa; Bigg Boss Tamil season 3; Cooku with Comali season 6; Chinnanchiru Kiliye	
2002–2016	Jyothi Lakshmi	Annamalai; Valli	
2005–2023	Kaajal Pasupathi	Kasthuri; Maanada Mayilada; Bigg Boss Tamil season 1; Iniya	
2019–2022	Kaavya Arivumani	Bharathi Kannamma; Pandian Stores	Replacement of V. J. Chitra in Pandian Stores
2001–2017	Kalyani	Pirivom Santhippom; Thayumanavan; Andal Azhagar	
2008–2024	Kaniha	Ethirneechal	
2019–2024	Kanmani Manoharan	Bharathi Kannamma; Amudhavum Annalakshmiyum	
2000–2021	Kanya Bharathi	Lakshmi; Kasthuri; Chellamay; Aval; Valli; Deivam Thandha Veedu; Nandini; Azhagiya Tamil Magal; Sundari Neeyum Sundaran Naanum; Anbe Vaa; Kannana Kanne; Chithiram Pesuthadi	
1998–present	Keerthana	Annamalai; Agni Natchathiram; Roja; Anbe Vaa; Ethirneechal; Magarasi; Chellamma	
1999–2022	Kuyili	Kasalavu Nesam; Jannal: Marabu Kavithaigal; Anni; Annamalai; Sorgam; Panneer Pushpangal; Alli Raajiyam; Kolangal; Kasthuri; Kana Kaanum Kaalangal; Megala; Kalasam; Thirupaavai; Mundhanai Mudichu; Shanthi Nilayam; Saravanan Meenatchi; Thayumanavan; Kalyanam Mudhal Kadhal Varai	
2006–2007	Lakshmi Gopalaswamy	Lakshmi	
2008–present	Lakshmy Ramakrishnan	Aval; Solvathellam Unmai	
2000–present	Latha	Chithi; Kasthuri; Valli; Chandrakumari; Siva Manasula Sakthi; Sundari Neeyum Sundaran Naanum; Roja; Abhiyum Naanum; Vaidhegi Kaathirundhaal; Mr. Manaivi	
2018–2020	Leesha Eclairs	Kanmani	
2012–2017	Madhumila	Office; Thayumanavan; Agni Paravai; Vinnaithaandi Varuvaayaa	
2019–2024	Madhumitha H	Ethirneechal; Ayyanar Thunai	
2010–2023	Maheshwari Chanakyan	Thayumanavan	
1995–present	Malavika Avinash	Anni; Chidambara Rahasiyam; Chellamay	
2001–2018	Mamathi Chari	Rani Maharani; Vani Rani; Bigg Boss Tamil season 2	
2009–present	Manimegalai	Vanakkam Sunmusic; Kalakka Povathu Yaaru? Champions; Cooku with Comali	
2020–present	Manishajith	Uyire; Ranjithame	
2017–2023	Maria Juliana	Bigg Boss Season 1; Kings of Comedy Juniors; Thendral Vandhu Ennai Thodum; Bigg Boss Ultimate 1; Thavamai Thavamirundhu	4th runner-up of Bigg Boss Ultimate season 1
2023	Maya S. Krishnan	Start Music Season 1; Murattu Singles Manmadhan; Bigg Boss Tamil season 7	2nd Runner Up of Bigg Boss Tamil season 7
1990–2019	Meena	Anbulla Amma; Housefull; Lakshmi; Kalyanam; Maanada Mayilada	
2017–2018	Meenakshi Govindarajan	Saravanan Meenatchi season 3; Villa to Village	
2012–present	Meera Krishna	Nayagi; Anbudan Kushi; Chithi 2; Thamizhum Saraswathiyum; Karthigai Deepam	
1999–2022	Meera Krishnan	Annamalai; Kana Kaanum Kaalangal; Gokulathil Seethai; Aan Paavam	
2015–2019	Meera Mitun	Jodi No.1 Season 8; Bigg Boss Tamil season 3	
2013–2020	Meghna Vincent	Deivam Thandha Veedu; Avalum Naanum; Ponmagal Vanthal	Replaced Saranya Sasi in Deivam Thandha Veedu; Replaced Ayesha Zeenath in Ponmagal Vanthal
2019–2022	Mersheena Neenu	Agni Natchathiram; Manthira Punnagai	
2018–2022	Monisha Arshak	Aranmanai Kili; Poove Poochudava; Naam Iruvar Namakku Iruvar; Pachakili	
1997–present	Mounika	Sorgam; Agni Natchathiram; Aaha Kalyanam	
2012–2023	Myna Nandhini	Azhagi; Saravanan Meenatchi Season 2; Saravanan Meenatchi Season 3	
2014–2024	Nakshathra Nagesh	Vani rani; Lakshmi Stores; Thamizhum Saraswathiyum	
2000–present	Nalini	Kolangal; Chinna Papa Periya Papa; Idhayam; Madhavi; Vaidehi; Pillai Nila; Rajakumari; Kalyana Parisu; Vani Rani; Sundari Neeyum Sundaran Naanum; Roja; Modhalum Kaadhalum; Malli	
1998–2021	Nancy Jennifer	Thayumanavan; Keladi Kanmani; Valli; Chithi 2	
2008–present	Nanditha Jennifer	Lakshmi Stores; Baakiyalakshmi; Karthigai Deepam	
1998–present	Neelima Rani	Thendral; Vani Rani; Thalayanai Pookal; Aranmanai Kili; Vanathai Pola	
2000–present	Nirosha	Chinna Papa Periya Papa; Chandrakumari; Vaidhegi Kaathirundhaal; Pandian Stores 2	
2011–2022	Nisha Ganesh	Valli; Deivamagal; Office; Nenjam Marappathillai	
2012–present	Nithya Ram	Aval; Nandini; Lakshmi Stores; Anna	
1986–present	Nithya Ravindran	Marmadesam; Alaigal; Chidambara Rahasiyam; Kalki; Geethanjali; Uravugal; Azhagi; Ilavarasi; Uthiripookkal; Apoorva Raagangal; Minnale; Priyasaki; Saravanan Meenatchi; Aranmanai Kili; Rasaathi; Namma Veetu Ponnu; Sundari	
1998–2008	Pallavi	Ganga Yamuna Saraswathi; Anandha Bhavan; Soolam; My Dear Bhootham; Kettimelam	
2018–present	Papri Ghosh	Pandavar Illam; Nayagi	
2015–2024	Pavani Reddy	Rettai Vaal Kuruvi; Rasaathi; Chinna Thambi; Bigg Boss Tamil season 5	
2021	Pavithra Lakshmi	Cooku with Comali season 2	
2018–present	Poornima Bhagyaraj	Kanmani; Suryavamsam; Enga Veetu Meenakshi; Malli	
2023–2024	Poornima Ravi	Bigg Boss Tamil season 7	
2008–present	Praveena	Maharani; Priyamanaval; Iniya; Raja Rani 2; Gettimelam	
2018–2020	Preethi Asrani	Minnale	
2018–present	Preethi Sharma	Thirumanam; Chithi 2; Poove Unakkaga; Anhiyum Naanum; Vanathai Pola; Malar	
2003–present	Priya	Magal; Thirumathi Selvam; Karunamanjari; Abirami; Bhairavi Aavigalukku Priyamanaval; Pasamalar; Vamsam; Pagal Nilavu; Arundhati; Mahalakshmi; Chinna Thambi; Poove Poochudava; Kalyana Parisu; Rettai Roja; Aranmanai Kili; Baakiyalakshmi; Magarasi; Roja; Thendral Vandhu Ennai Thodum; Nala Damayanthi	
2011–2016	Priya Bhavani Shankar	Kalyanam Mudhal Kadhal Varai	
2000–2022	Priya Raman	Sembaruthi; Senthoora Poove	
2009–present	Priyanka Deshpande	Kalakka Povathu Yaaru; Super Singer; Bigg Boss Tamil season 5; Oo Solriya Oo Oohm Solriya; Cooku with Comali season 5	
2018–2024	Priyanka Nalkari	Roja; Seetha Raman; Nala Damayanthi	
2011–2023	Rachitha Mahalakshmi	Pirivom Santhippom; Saravanan Meenatchi (season 2); Saravanan Meenatchi (season 3); Nachiyarpuram; Naam Iruvar Namakku Iruvar; Bigg Boss Tamil season 6	
1991–present	Radhika Sarathkumar	Penn; Chithi; Chellamay; Vani Rani; Thayamma Kudumbathaar	
2020-2022	Radhika Preethi	Poove Unakkaga	
1998–present	Rajashree	Ganga Yamuna Saraswati; Jee Boom Ba; Sivamayam; Magal; Idhayam; Vamsam; Chithi 2; Amudhavum Annalakshmiyum	
1991; 2007–present	Rajyalakshmi	Penn; Megala; Kasthuri; Pirivom Santhippom; Chellamay; Deivamagal; Raja Rani; Baakiyalakshmi; Anbe Vaa; Annam	
2013–2023	Raksha Holla	Vamsam; Tamil Kadavul Murugan; Naam Iruvar Namakku Iruvar	
2008–2022	Ramya Krishnan	Thangam; Kalasam; Rajakumari; Vamsam; Bigg Boss 5 Tamil; BB Jodigal 2	Temporary replacement of Kamal Haasan in Bigg Boss 5 on week 8
2019–2022	Ramya Pandian	Cooku with Comali Season 1; Bigg Boss Tamil season 4; Bigg Boss Ultimate season 1	
2016–2023	Rashmi Prabhakar	Arundhati; Kanne Kalaimaane	
2009; 2016–2024	Raveena Daha	Thangam; Poove Poochudava; Mouna Raagam 2; Jodi Are U Ready	
2005–present	Reena	Lakshmi; Thirumathi Selvam; Keladi Kanmani; Vandhal Sridevi; Run; Rasaathi; Rettai Roja	
2013–2024	Rekha Krishnappa	Deivamagal; Nandini; Thamizhum Saraswathiyum	
2013–present	Reshma Pasupuleti	Vani Rani; Andal Azhagar; Anbe Vaa; Baakiyalakshmi; Abhi Tailor; Seetha Raman	
1996–2020	Revathi Sankaran	Marmadesam; Anni; Kalyana Parisu	
2018–2022	Rithika Tamil Selvi	Raja Rani; Siva Manasula Sakthi; Chocolate; Baakiyalakshmi	
2022–2023	Riya Vishwanathan	Raja Rani; Sandakozhi; Nala Damayanthi	
1996–present	Roopa Sree	Kadhal Pagadai; Ahalya; Bharathi Kannamma	
2019–2022	Roshini Haripriyan	Bharathi Kannamma	
2012–2015	Sabarna Anand	Thendral; Pasamalar	
1991–present	Sabitha Anand	Kolangal; Sivasakthi; Pillai Nila; Deivamagal; Mappillai; Rettai Roja; Naam Iruvar Namakku Iruvar; Senthoora Poove; Anbe Sivam; Peranbu; Nala Damayanthi	
2000–present	Sadhana	Penn; Rekha IPS; Thendral; Idhayam; Kalyana Parisu; Kalyanam Mudhal Kadhal Varai; Chinna Thambi; Maari	
2018–2022	Sakshi Agarwal	Soppanna Sundari; Bigg Boss Tamil season 3; Kannana Kanne	
1999–2019	Sakunthala.A	Kasthuri; Kalyana Parisu; Sabitha Engira Sabapathi	
2018–2019	Saleema	Lakshmi Stores	
2016–2020	Sameera Sherief	Pagal Nilavu; Rekka Katti Parakkudhu Manasu	
2018–2021	Sanam Shetty	Villa To Village; Bigg Boss Tamil season 4	
2009–2017	Sandra Amy	Roja Kootam; Thangam; Thalayanai Pookal; Bigg Boss Tamil season 9	
2001–2017	Santhoshi	Ilavarsi; Maragatha Veenai	
2000–2024	Sathyapriya	Kolangal; Roja Kootam; Idhayam; Muthaaram; Shanthi Nilayam; Vamsam; Avalum Naanum; Kalyana Parisu; Run; Mahalakshmi; Neethane Enthan Ponvasantham; Ethirneechal	
2002–2011	Seetha	Penn; Idhayam	
2006–2022	Senthi Kumari	Kana Kaanum Kaalangal; Saravanan Meenatchi 3; Vanathai Pola	
2024	Shaalin Zoya	Cooku with Comali season 5	
2016–present	Shabana Shahjahan	Sembaruthi; Mr. Manaivi; Cooku with Comali season 6	
2018–2021	Shakeela	Cooku with Comali season 2; Kanni Theevu Ullasa Ulagam 2.0	
2008–2023	Shamitha Shreekumar	Sivasakthi; Pillai Nila; Ponnunjal; Mouna Raagam; Peranbu; Ponni	
2002–present	Shanthi Arvind	Metti Oli; Kula Deivam; Eeramana Rojave; Kannana Kanne; Ilakkiya; Sakthivel: Theeyaai Oru Theeraa Kaadhal	
2000–present	Shanthi Williams	Chithi; Metti Oli; Annamalai; Kalasam; Thendral; Shanthi Nilayam; Thangam; Uravugal; Pillai Nila; Vani Rani; Andal Azhagar; Pandian Stores; Azhagu; Kanmani; Senthoora Poove; Magarasi; Deivam Thantha Poove; Pudhu Vasantham	
2012–present	Sharanya Turadi	Nenjam Marappathillai; Run; Pandian Stores 2	
1999–present	Dr. Sharmila	Pagal Nilavu; Roja	
2016–2021	Shivani Narayanan	Pagal Nilavu; Rettai Roja	
2021–present	Shritha Sivadas	Enga Veetu Meenakshi; Veetuku Veedu Vaasapadi	
2009–present	Shruthi Raj	Thendral; Azhagu	
2022–2023	Shrutika	Cooku with Comali Season 3; Kalakka Povathu Yaaru? Champions	Title Winner of Cooku with Comali Season 3
2009–2023	Shwetha Bandekar	Magal; Lakshmi Vandhachu; Nila; Roja; Magarasi; Anbe Vaa	
1999–2024	Sindhu Shyam	Deivamagal; Pagal Nilavu; Kizhakku Vaasal	
2019–2023	Sivaangi Krishnakumar	Super Singer 7; Comedy Raja Kalakkal Rani; Cooku with Comali; Oo Solriya Oo Oohm Solriya	3rd Runner-Up of Cooku with Comali season 4
2018–2019	Snisha Chandran	Neelakuyil	
2002–present	Sonia	Chellamay; Uravugal; Kannamma; Vandhal Sridevi; Jamelaa; Meena	
2010–2024	Soundarya Bala Nandakumar	Pagal Nilavu	
2001–2017	Sreeja Chandran	Mundhanai Mudichu; Saravanan Meenatchi; Mappillai	
2012–2022	Sreethu Krishnan	7C; Aayutha Ezhuthu; Kalyanamam Kalyanam	
2007–present	Sridevi Ashok	Kasthuri; Ilavarasi; Thangam; Pirivom Santhippom; Vani Rani; Kalyana Parisu; Kalyanam Mudhal Kadhal Varai; Poove Poochudava; Sembaruthi; Raja Rani 1; Aranmanai Kili; Kaatrukkenna Veli; Thalattu; Ponni; Modhalum Kaadhalum	
2007–2021	Srithika	Kalasam; Gokulathil Seethai; Nadhaswaram; Mamiyar Thevai; Vaidehi; Uyirmei; Kula Deivam; Kalyana Parisu	
2021–2023	Srushti Dange	Survivor Tamil season 1; Cooku with Comali season 4	
2006–2024	Sudha Chandran	Kalasam; Soundaravalli; Thendral; Deivam Thandha Veedu; Lakshmi Stores	
2023–present	Sujatha Sivakumar	Mahanadhi; Top Cooku Dupe Cooku season 1	
1998–present	Sujitha	Ganga Yamuna Saraswati; Maharani; Pandian Stores; Gowri; Cooku with Comali season 5	
1999–present	Sukanya	Anandam; Adhiparasakthi	
1990–2021	Sulakshana	Magal; Gokulathil Seethai; Maharani; Mundhanai Mudichu; Thangam; Azhagi; Deivam Thandha Veedu; Lakshmi Vandhachu; Devathaiyai Kanden; Aranmanai Kili; Rasaathi; Kannana Kanne; Anbe Vaa; Pandian Stores	
2001–2002	Suvaluxmi	Soolam	
2009–2018	Suzane George	Thendral; Athipookal; Thyagam; Saravanan Meenatchi; Office; Pagal Nilavu	
2000–2014	Swarnamalya	Nimmathi Ungal Choice; Thekkathi Ponnu; Vandhaale Maharasi; Thangam	
2020–present	Swathi Konde	Eeramana Rojave season 2; Moondru Mudichu	
1999–2001	Tharika	Chithi	
2017–2019	Ujjayinee Roy	Valli; Roja	
2000–2004	Uma Padmanabhan	Kasthuri; Vinnaithaandi Varuvaayaa; Poove Poochudava; Modhalum Kaadhalum	
2000–2023	Uma Riyaz Khan	Vinnaithaandi Varuvaayaa; Vamsam; Ninaika Therintha Manamae; Chandrakumari; Kayal	
1991–present	Vadivukkarasi	Ganga Yamuna Saraswati; Alaigal; Megala; Thirumathi Selvam; Bhavani; Kasthuri; Uthiripookkal; Vamsam; Kula Deivam; Saravanan Meenatchi; Roja; Chinna Thambi; Nachiyarpuram; Poove Unakkaga; Rettai Roja; Kayal; Manthira Punnagai; Amudhavum Annalakshmiyum; Iniya; Karthigai Deepam	
2017–2022	Vanessa Cruez	Annai Madi; Nethraa; Survivor Tamil season 1	2nd Runner-up of Survivor season 1
2012–2024	Vani Bhojan	Deivamagal; Lakshmi Vandhachu	
2001–2024	Vanitha Krishnachandran	Alaigal; Kolangal; Madhavi; Mullum Malarum; Kalyana Parisu 2	
2000–2023	Vanitha Vijayakumar	Bigg Boss Tamil season 3; Cooku with Comali Season 1; Kalakka Povathu Yaaru?; BB Jodigal; Thirumathi Hitler; Pudhu Pudhu Arthangal; Maari; Bigg Boss Ultimate season 1; Oo Solriya Oo Oohm Solriya	Winner of Cooku with Comali Season 1
2005–2024	P. R. Varalakshmi	Chellamay; Neelakuyil; Yaaradi Nee Mohini; Thaenmozhi B.A; Roja; Kaatrukkenna Veli; Sundari; Amman; Pachakili; Modhalum Kaadhalum; Sandhya Raagam	
1992–2010	K. R. Vatsala	Thirumathi Selvam; Thendral	
2000–2017	Vennira Aadai Nirmala	Kalki; Deivamagal	
2013–2021	Vidhya Mohan	Valli; Abhiyum Naanum	
2018–2020	Vidya Pradeep	Nayagi	
2007–2008; 2011–2017	Vijayalakshmi	Vasantham; Chellamay; Mundhanai Mudichu; Muthaaram; Nandini	
2018–2022	Vijayalakshmi Feroz	Nayagi; Bigg Boss Tamil 2; Survivor Tamil 1	2nd Runner-up in Bigg Boss Tamil 2 Sole Survivor of Survivor Tamil season 1
1991–2019	Viji Chandrasekhar	Azhagi; Annamalai; Kolangal; Penn; Azhagi; Chandrakumari	
2018–2020	Vindhuja Vikraman	Kanmani; Ponnukku Thanga Manasu	
2020–present	Vinodhini Vaidyanathan	Anandha Ragam; Nala Damayanthi; Thangamagal	
2022–present	Vinusha Devi	Bharathi Kannamma; Bharathi Kannamma 2; Panivizhum Malarvanam	
2017–2022	Yashika Aannand	Connexion Season 2; Maya; Bigg Boss Season 2; Jodi Season 10: Fun Unlimited; Morattu Singles	
1996–2020	Yuvarani	Chithi; Thendral; Lakshmi Kalayanam; Poove Poochudava; Minnale	

== Malayalam ==
Artist	Notable Work
Chippy	Sthree Janmam (Surya TV); Sthree oru Santhwanam (Asianet); Sthreehridayam (Surya TV); Nokketha Doorath(Asianet); Amma Manassu(Asianet); Sree Guruvayoorappan(Surya TV); Akashadoothu(Surya TV); Sreekrishnan(Surya TV) Vanambadi, Santhwanam(Asianet)
Meera Vasudevan	Kudumbavilakku; Kanalpoovu
Praveena	Swami Ayyappan; Kasthooriman
Swasika	Dhathuputhri; My Marumakan; Chinthavishtayaya Seetha; Seetha
Malavika Wales	Ammuvinte Amma; Manjil Virinja Poovu, Ponnambili
Nisha Sarang	Uppum Mulakum
Manju Pillai	Thatteem Mutteem, Sathi Leelavathi, Life is beautiful, Indumukhi Chandramathi
Varada Jishin	Amala, Pranayam, Ilayaval Gayathri
Sonu Satheesh Kumar	Sthreedhanam, Sumangali Bhava
Shalu Kurian	Chandanamazha, Thatteem Mutteem, Sarayu, Indira
Sujitha	Harichandanam, Kanakkinavu, Devimahathyam
Krishna Praba	Akashadoothu – Surya TV; Alaudinte Albuthavilakku (Serial) – Asianet; Snehaveedu (Serial) – Surya TV
Sreelakshmi	Ardhachandrante Rathri; Maranam Durbalam
Zeenath	Poovanpazham
Seema G. Nair	Vanambadi
Kavitha Nair	Thonnyaksharangal, Nandanam
Shafna	Sahayathrika, Sundari, Bhagyajathakam
Sruthi Lakshmi	Pokkuveyil (TV series), Kathayariyathe, Nizhalukal
Praveena	Swapnam, Megham, Devimahathyam, Kasthooriman
Vinaya Prasad	Sthree, Sthree 2, Sarada
Sreekala Sasidharan	Ente Manasaputhri, Amma, Rathrimazha
Mersheena Neenu	Sathya Enna Penkutty, Ayalathe Sundari, Thonnyaksharangal
Asha Sarath	Kumkumapoovu
Shelly Kishore	Kumkumapoovu, Sthreepadham
Rekha Ratheesh	Parasparam; Manjil Virinja Poovu
Meghna Vincent	Chandanamazha
Divya Vishwanath	Sthreedhanam, Mizhirandilum, Gouri, Mamattikutty
Mridula Vijay	Krishnathulasi; Bharya; Pookkalam Varavayi
Archana Suseelan	Ente Manasaputhri; Karuthamuthu; Seetha Kalyanam; Ammakili
Beena Antony	Samayam; Ommanathingalpakshi, Mayaseetha, Ente Manasaputhri, Autograph, Thapasya
Thara Kalyan	Chembarathi; Karuthamuthu
Anila Sreekumar	Deepangal chuttum, Draupadi, Jwalayayi, Sooryaputhri
Chandra Lakshman	Swantham, Sthree 2, Unniyarcha
Sreeja Chandran	Kudumbini, Sneham, Pritam, Swantham
Ambili Devi	Krishnathulasi; Sthreepadham; Vikramadithyan
Rebecca Santhosh	Kasthooriman; Mizhirandilum; Neermalathalam
Reshmi Soman	Nombarappoovu; Akshayapathram
Sangeetha Mohan	Soumini, Jwalayayi,Chandrodayam
Aishwarya Bhaskar	Parijatham; Chembarathi; Swami Ayyappan
Sajitha Betti	Alippazham; Ammakkili; Alaudinte Athbudavilaku
Anu Joseph	Minnukettu; Karyam Nisaaram; Alilathali
Shalu Menon	Swantham, Swarnamayooram,Sthreejanmam
Lintu Rony	Bharya,Eeran Nilavu
Arya Satheesh	Sthreedhanam, Ardram,Ishtam
Sona Nair	Rachiamma, Autograph, Ente Manasaputhri
Neena Kurup	Soumini, Ponnum Poovum, Chackoyum Maryyum
Sreelatha Namboothiri	Harichandanam, Orma, Karuthamuthu, Kasthooriman
Darshana Das	Mounaragam, Karuthamuthu, Sumangali Bhava
Chitra Shenoy	Sthreedhanam, Pournami Thinkal
Roopa Sree	Chandanamazha, Seetha Kalyanam
Reshmi Boban	Asooyapookkal, Maaya, Nombarapoovu, Priyapettaval
Anju Aravind	Malarvadi, Sthreetham, Megham, Holidays
Priya Raman	Orma, Swarnamayooram, Kavyanjali
Surabhi Lakshmi	Kathayile Rajakumari, M80 Moosa
Sneha Sreekumar	Marimayam
Surabhi Santosh	Pavithram
Dhanya Mary Varghese	Seetha Kalyanam
Reneesha Rahiman	Seetha Kalyanam, Manassinakkare, Janakiyudeyum Abhiyudeyum Veedu
Gopika Anil	Kabani, Santhwanam
Stephy Leon	Bhavana, Arayannangalude Veedu
Sreethu Krishnan	Ammayariyathe
Anshitha Akbarsha	Kabani, Koodevide
Avanthika Mohan	Thoovalsparsham, Athmasakhi, Manimuthu
Sandra Babu	Thoovalsparsham, Chocolate, Kanalpoovu

== Telugu ==
Artist	Notable Work
Kasthuri Shankar	Intinti Gruhalakshmi
Keerthi Bhat	Manasichi Choodu; Karthika Deepam
Marina Abraham	America Ammayi
Meghana Lokesh	Sasirekha Parinayam; Raktha Sambandham
Nithya Ram	Muddu Bidda; Amma Naa Kodala
Pallavi Ramisetty	Aadade Aadharam; Maate Mantramu
Pavani Reddy	Agni Poolu; Srimathi
Preeti Amin	Chakravakam, Aloukika; Nanna
Preeti Nigam	Swathi Chinukulu; America Ammayi
Premi Viswanath	Karthika Deepam
Priyanka Nalkari	Meghamala; Sravana Sameeralu
Radhika Sarathkumar	Idhi Katha Kadu; Vaani Rani
Sameera Sherief	Abhishekam; Muddu Bidda; Bharayamani
Sithara	Swathi Chinukulu
Suhasini	Girija Kalyanam; Devatha
Sujitha	Karthavyam; Vadinamma
Yamuna	Anveshitha; Raktha Sambandham

== Kannada ==
Artist	Notable work
Aparna	Moodala Mane; Mukta; Majaa Talkies; Ivalu Sujatha
Kavitha Gowda	Lakshmi Baramma; Vidya Vinayaka
Kruttika Ravindra	Mane Magalu; Radha Kalyana
Nithya Ram	Benkiyalli Aralida Hoovu; Karpoorada Gombe; Eradu Kanasu; Nandini; Girija Kalyana
Ranjani Raghavan	Akashadeepa; Putta Gowri Maduve; Pournami Thinkal; Ishta Devathe; Kannadathi
Rashmi Prabhakar	Mahabharatha; Lakshmi Baramma

== Marathi ==
Artist	Notable Work	Notes
Pallavi Subhash	Char Divas Sasuche; Adhuri Ek Kahani; Saheb Bibi Aani Mi; Guntata Hriday He	
Suruchi Adarkar	Ka Re Durava; Satvya Mulichi Satavi Mulgi	
Priya Berde	Bhagyalaxmi; Ajunahi Chandraat Aahe	
Rutuja Bagwe	Nanda Saukhya Bhare; Chandra Aahe Sakshila	
Suchitra Bandekar	Vahinisaheb; Aabhas Ha	
Abhidnya Bhave	Tula Pahate Re; Rang Majha Vegla; Khulta Kali Khulena; Tu Tevha Tashi; Tarini	
Trupti Bhoir	Char Divas Sasuche	
Sanskruti Balgude	Pinjara	
Rupali Bhosale	Aai Kuthe Kay Karte!; Shejari Shejari Pakke Shejari	
Shreya Bugde	Tu Tithe Me; Chala Hawa Yeu Dya	
Anita Date-Kelkar	Majhya Navaryachi Bayko; Eka Lagnachi Tisri Goshta; Nava Gadi Nava Rajya	
Mrunmayee Deshpande	Kunku; Sa Re Ga Ma Pa Marathi Li'l Champs	
Gautami Deshpande	Saare Tujhyachsathi; Majha Hoshil Na	
Teja Devkar	Kulswamini; Vrundavan	
Mayuri Deshmukh	Khulta Kali Khulena; Man Dhaga Dhaga Jodte Nava	
Hruta Durgule	Durva; Phulpakharu; Man Udu Udu Jhala	
Mrunal Dusanis	Maziya Priyala Preet Kalena; Tu Tithe Me; Sukhachya Sarini He Man Baware; Assa Sasar Surekh Baai; Lagnanantar Hoilach Prem	
Jui Gadkari	Pudhcha Paaul; Tharala Tar Mag!	
Sakhi Gokhale	Dil Dosti Duniyadari; Dil Dosti Dobara	
Shubhangi Gokhale	Kahe Diya Pardes; Raja Ranichi Ga Jodi; Yeu Kashi Tashi Me Nandayla; Shriyut Gangadhar Tipre; Premachi Gosht	
Shubhangi Joshi	Kahe Diya Pardes; Vadalvaat; Kunku Tikali Ani Tatoo	
Poorva Gokhale	Kulvadhu; Veen Doghantali Hi Tutena	
Rohini Hattangadi	Char Divas Sasuche; Honar Soon Mi Hya Gharchi; Yashoda – Goshta Shyamchya Aaichi; Tharala Tar Mag!; Sakhya Re; Boss Majhi Ladachi; Sukhi Mansacha Sadara; Doctor Don	
Surabhi Hande	Jai Malhar; Lakshmi Sadaiv Mangalam	
Spruha Joshi	Eka Lagnachi Tisri Goshta; Sur Nava Dhyas Nava; Lokmanya	
Neha Joshi	Ka Re Durava; Avaghachi Sansar	
Suhas Joshi	Agnihotra; Aabhalmaya; Kunku; Lalit 205; Tu Tevha Tashi	
Neha Khan	Devmanus	
Harshada Khanvilkar	Pudhcha Paaul; Aabhalmaya; Sukh Mhanje Nakki Kay Asta!; Rang Majha Vegla; Ghadge & Suun; Lakshmi Niwas; Kalat Nakalat; Mulgi Pasant Aahe!	
Urmilla Kanetkar	Asambhav; Tuzech Mi Geet Gaat Aahe	
Mrinal Kulkarni	Avantika; Guntata Hriday He	
Sukanya Kulkarni	Aabhalmaya; Julun Yeti Reshimgathi; Chukbhul Dyavi Ghyavi; Ghadge & Suun; Shubhmangal Online; Kon Hotis Tu, Kay Zalis Tu!; Ase He Sundar Aamche Ghar	
Kavita Lad	Char Divas Sasuche; Radha Hi Bawari; Radha Prem Rangi Rangli; Tula Shikvin Changlach Dhada	
Prateeksha Lonkar	Swarajyarakshak Sambhaji; Aboli	
Shruti Marathe	Radha Hi Bawari; Jaago Mohan Pyare	
Prajakta Mali	Julun Yeti Reshimgathi; Naktichya Lagnala Yaycha Ha; Maharashtrachi Hasyajatra	
Mitali Mayekar	Freshers; Ladachi Mi Lek Ga!	
Usha Nadkarni	Ase He Sundar Aamche Ghar; Khulta Kali Khulena	
Apurva Nemlekar	Aabhas Ha; Aaradhana; Ratris Khel Chale 2; Tuza Maza Jamtay; Ratris Khel Chale 3; Premachi Gosht	
Tejaswini Pandit	Ekach Hya Janmi Janu; 100 Days; Tuza Ni Maza Ghar Shrimantacha	
Tejashri Pradhan	Honar Soon Mi Hya Gharchi; Aggabai Sasubai; Lek Ladaki Hya Gharchi; Tuza Ni Maza Ghar Shrimantacha; Premachi Gosht; Veen Doghantali Hi Tutena	
Aetashaa Sansgiri	Chhoti Malkin; Dakkhancha Raja Jotiba; Nivedita Majhi Taai; Tujhya Sobatine	
Aditi Sarangdhar	Vadalvaat; H.M. Bane T.M. Bane; Lakshya; Yeu Kashi Tashi Me Nandayla; Satvya Mulichi Satavi Mulgi; Muramba; Sanai Chaughade	
Nivedita Saraf	Duheri; Bandhan; Aggabai Sasubai; Aggabai Sunbai; Bhagya Dile Tu Mala; Krushnaichya Leki; Aai Ani Baba Retire Hot Aahet!	
Ruchi Savarn	Sakhya Re	
Nirmiti Sawant	Kumari Gangubai Non-Matric; 1760 Sasubai; Jadubai Jorat; Constable Kamana Kamtekar	
Kishori Shahane	Jadubai Jorat; Pinkicha Vijay Aso!; Yed Lagla Premacha	
Reshma Shinde	Rang Majha Vegla; Nanda Saukhya Bhare; Gharoghari Matichya Chuli	
Neha Shitole	Ka Re Durava; Tu Tithe Me; Kunku; Ashok Ma.Ma.	
Rasika Sunil	Majhya Navaryachi Bayko	
Shivani Surve	Devyani; Thoda Tuza Ani Thoda Maza	
Pari Telang	Lakshya; Aabhalmaya; Lavangi Mirchi; Tu Chal Pudha; Paaru; Sadhi Manasa	
Swanandi Tikekar	Dil Dosti Duniyadari; Dil Dosti Dobara; Assa Maher Nako Ga Bai!	
Varsha Usgaonkar	Man Udhan Varyache; Tujhyavina; Sukh Mhanje Nakki Kay Asta!	
Girija Oak	Lajja	
Amruta Khanvilkar	Jeevlaga	
Nishigandha Wad	Kulvadhu; Jai Bhawani Jai Shivaji	
Sulabha Deshpande	Asmita; Savitri	
Amruta Deshmukh	Freshers; Me Tuzich Re; Lakshmi Niwas; Asmita	
Mayuri Wagh	Ti Phulrani; Love Lagna Locha; Asmita; Aashirvad Tuza Ekvira Aai; Aboli	
Pallavi Patil	Jigarbaaz; Nava Gadi Nava Rajya	
Deepali Pansare	Devyani; Aai Kuthe Kay Karte!; Lakshmichya Paulanni	
Deepa Parab	Tu Chal Pudha; Suna Yeti Ghara	
Prarthana Behere	Majhi Tujhi Reshimgath	
Shilpa Tulaskar	Tu Tevha Tashi; Tula Pahate Re; Megh Datale	
Shivani Baokar	Lagira Zala Ji; Lavangi Mirchi; Alti Palti Sumdit Kalti; Sadhi Manasa	
Nandita Patkar	Majhe Pati Saubhagyawati; Sahkutumb Sahparivar	
Sulekha Talwalkar	Majha Hoshil Na; Muramba; Sang Tu Aahes Ka?; Shejari Shejari Pakke Shejari; Savalyachi Janu Savali	
Vishakha Subhedar	Shubhvivah; Ka Re Durava	
Smita Talwalkar	Avantika; Oon Paaus; Abhilasha	
Isha Keskar	Jai Malhar; Majhya Navaryachi Bayko; Lakshmichya Paulanni	
Madhurani Gokhale	Aai Kuthe Kay Karte!; Asambhav; Mi Savitribai Jotirao Phule	
Revati Lele	Swamini; Lagnachi Bedi; Kon Hotis Tu Kay Zalis Tu	
Aishwarya Narkar	Ya Sukhano Ya; Swamini; Lek Majhi Ladki; Satvya Mulichi Satavi Mulgi	
Tejaswini Lonari	Devmanus 2; Tuzech Mi Geet Gaat Aahe	
Bhargavi Chirmule	Vahinisaheb; Jago Mohan Pyaare; Tarini; Aai Mayecha Kavach; Anubandh	
Sai Tamhankar	Anubandh; Maharashtrachi Hasyajatra	
Priya Bapat	Shubham Karoti; De Dhamal; Adhuri Ek Kahani	
Mukta Barve	Eka Lagnachi Dusri Goshta; Rudram; Ajunahi Barsaat Aahe	
Savita Prabhune	Khulta Kali Khulena; Swabhiman – Shodh Astitvacha; Jawai Vikat Ghene Aahe; Gharoghari Matichya Chuli; Oon Paaus	
Surekha Kudachi	Bhagyalaxmi; Pinkicha Vijay Aso!; Swabhiman – Shodh Astitvacha; Shetkarich Navara Hava; Julali Gaath Ga	
Reena Madhukar	Man Udu Udu Jhala	
Dnyanada Ramtirthkar	Thipkyanchi Rangoli; Sakhya Re; Shatada Prem Karave; Lagnanantar Hoilach Prem	
Sayali Sanjeev	Kahe Diya Pardes; Shubhmangal Online	
Amruta Subhash	Avaghachi Sansar	
Ashwini Ekbote	Vahinisaheb; Arundhati; Asambhav	
Neena Kulkarni	Adhuri Ek Kahani; Swarajyajanani Jijamata; Yed Lagla Premacha	
Kishori Godbole	Adhuri Ek Kahani; Madhuri Middleclass	
Shubhangi Latkar	Adhuri Ek Kahani; Man Dhaga Dhaga Jodte Nava	
Rekha Kamat	Eka Lagnachi Dusri Goshta	
Leena Bhagwat	Eka Lagnachi Dusri Goshta; Honar Soon Mi Hya Gharchi; Thipkyanchi Rangoli; Ya Sukhano Ya	
Supriya Pathare	Jago Mohan Pyaare; Pudhcha Paaul; Thipkyanchi Rangoli; Kulvadhu; Sadhi Manasa; Honar Soon Mi Hya Gharchi	
Resham Tipnis	Ya Sukhano Ya; Aboli	
Neha Bam	Tujhyat Jeev Rangala; Avaghachi Sansar; Navri Mile Hitlerla	
Ruchira Jadhav	Majhya Navaryachi Bayko; Majhe Pati Saubhagyawati; 36 Guni Jodi; Tu Hi Re Maza Mitwa	
Hemangi Kavi	Avaghachi Sansar; Mrs. Mukhyamantri; Lek Majhi Durga	
Sharvani Pillai	Mulgi Zali Ho; Khulta Kali Khulena	
Bhagyashree Mote	Devyani	
Neha Pendse	Bhagyalakshmi	
Sharmishtha Raut	Saara Kahi Tichyasathi; Julun Yeti Reshimgathi; Sukhachya Sarini He Man Baware; Aboli; Suna Yeti Ghara	
Manava Naik	Tuza Maza Jamena; Tumchi Mulgi Kay Karte?	
Madhugandha Kulkarni	Julun Yeti Reshimgathi	
Renuka Shahane	Band Baja Varat; Fu Bai Fu	
Shweta Shinde	Avaghachi Sansar; Doctor Don; Lakshya	
Shilpa Thakre	Navi Janmen Mi	
Vanita Kharat	Tuzech Mi Geet Gaat Aahe; Sundari	
Vandana Gupte	Sukhachya Sarini He Man Baware; Daar Ughad Baye; Punha Kartavya Aahe	
Supriya Pilgaonkar	Maharashtracha Favourite Dancer	
Urmila Matondkar	Dance Maharashtra Dance	
Sonalee Kulkarni	Yuva Dancing Queen	

== Bengali ==
Years active	Name	Known for
2008–present	Anjana Basu	Bodhuboron; @Bhalobasha.com; Bijoyinee; Bidhir Bidhan
2022–present	Ankita Mallick	Jagadhatri
2023–present	Abhika Malakar	Tomader Rani
2011–present	Anushree Das	Binni Dhaner Khoi; Ishti Kutum; Jol Nupur; Punyi Pukur; Phagun Bou; Bajlo Tomar Alor Benu; Nokshi Kantha; Sreemoyee; Mohor; Khorkuto
2008–present	Ananya Chatterjee	Subarnalata; Jai Kali Kalkattawali
2000–present	Aparajita Adhya	Ek Akasher Niche; Maa....Tomay Chara Ghum Ashena; Jol Nupur; Punyi Pukur
2019–present	Aratrika Maity	Khelna Bari; Mithijhora; Jowar Bhanta
2005–present	Aparajita Ghosh Das	Ekdin Pratidin; Ekhane Aakash Neel; Kojagori; Kusum Dola
2002–present	Arunima Ghosh	Ek Akasher Niche; Khela
2010–present	Basabdatta Chatterjee	Gaaner Oparey; Boyei Gelo; Mon Niye Kachakachi; Netaji
2000–present	Chaiti Ghoshal	Ek Akasher Niche; Mohona
2010–present	Debaparna Chakraborty	Bojhena Se Bojhena
2017–present	Debadrita Basu	Joyee; Alo Chhaya; Shree Krishna Bhakto Meera
2023–present	Divyani Mondal	Phulki
2009–present	Ditipriya Roy	Aparajito; Karunamoyee Rani Rashmoni
2016–present	Debattama Saha	E Amar Gurudakshina
2007–present	Debolina Dutta	Mohona; Sokhi; Andarmahal; Sreemoyee
2007–present	Ena Saha	Sangsar Sukher Hoy Romonir Gune; Bou Kotha Kao
2015–present	Hiya Dey	Potol Kumar Gaanwala; Falna
2021–present	Hiya Mukherjee	Nayantara; Geeta LL.B; Ganga
2015–present	Indrani Halder	Goyenda Ginni; Seemarekha; Sreemoyee
2024–present	Ishani Chatterjee	Parineeta
2020–present	Indrani Dutta	Jibon Saathi
2007–present	Gargi Roychowdhury	Krishnokali Tarei Boli; Sindoorkhela
2016–present	Ishaa M Saha	Jhanjh Lobongo Phool
2011–present	Laboni Sarkar	Mrs.Singha Roy; Ichche Nodee; Falna; Sangsar Sukher Hoy Romonir Gune
2011–present	Madhumita Sarkar	Sobinoy Nibedon; Care Kori Na; Bojhena Se Bojhena; Kusum Dola; Bhole baba par kare ga
2009–present	Manali Dey	Bou Kotha Kao; Sokhi; Bhootu; Nokshi Kantha; Dhulokona; Kar kache koi moner Kotha; Duggamoni o baghmama
2009–present	Manasi Sinha	Bodhu Kon Alo Laaglo Chokhe; Bhasha; Potol Kumar Gaanwala; Goyenda Ginni; Jai Kali Kalkattawali
2002–present	Madhabi Mukherjee	Ishti Kutum; Sanyashi Raja; Kusum Dola
2008–present	Monami Ghosh	Binni Dhaner Khoi; Mukhosh Manush; Hiyaar Majhe; Punyi Pukur; Irabotir Chupkotha
2006–present	Moumita Gupta	Khela; Stree; Aaj Aari Kal Bhaab; Kiranmala; Bou Kotha Kao
2022–present	Mohana Maiti	Gouri Elo; Ke Prothom Kachhe Esechhi; Tui Amar Hero
2008–present	Mimi Chakraborty	Gaaner Oparey
2016–present	Neha Amandeep	Stree; Om Namah Shivay; Kone Bou
2009–present	Parno Mitra	Bou Kotha Kao; Kora Pakhi
2008–present	Payel De	Durga; Behula; Bodhu Kon Alo Laaglo Chokhe; Maa Durga; Tobu Mone Rekho; Chuni Panna; Desher Maati
2014–present	Rukma Roy	Kiranmala; Kundo Phooler Mala; Khorkuto; Desher Maati; Lalkuthi
2009–present	Riddhima Ghosh	Bou Kotha Kao
2000-2017	Rita Koiral	Saat Paake Bandha; Raakhi Bandhan; Stree
2000–present	Rita Dutta Chakraborty	Maa....Tomay Chara Ghum Ashena; Bhasha; Andarmahal; Kusum Dola; Desher Maati
2009–present	Ritabhari Chakraborty	Ogo Bodhu Sundori
2011–present	Rii Sen	Trinayani; Dhrubatara
2008–present	Sandipta Sen	Durga; Tapur Tupur; Tumi Asbe Bole; Pratidaan; Aye Khuku Aye
2020–present	Swastika Ghosh	Saraswatir Prem; Anurager Chhowa
2014–present	Solanki Roy	Kotha Dilam; Ichche Nodee; Prothoma Kadambini; Gaatchora; Milon Hobe koto Dine
2021–present	Srijla Guha	Mon Phagun
2021–present	Sushmita Dey	Aparajita Apu; Bouma Ekghor; Panchami; Kotha
2014–present	Sohini Sengupta	Khorkuto
2013–present	Sanchari Mondal	Goyenda Ginni; Joyee; Irabotir Chupkotha; Dhrubatara
2006–present	Sonali Chowdhury	Khela; Agnipariksha; Jol Nupur; Saat Bhai Champa
2010–present	Shweta Bhattacharya	Sindoorkhela; @Bhalobasha.com; Tumi Robe Nirobe; Jorowar Jhumko; Konok Kakon; Jamuna Dhaki; Sohagh jol
2010–present	Sampurna Lahiri	Tare Ami Chokhe Dekhini; Nojor
2000–present	Samata Das	Ek Akasher Niche; Sreemoyee; Karunamoyee Rani Rashmoni
2000–present	Sudipa Basu	Ek Akasher Niche; Tapur Tupur; Ekhane Aakash Neel
2000–present	Swastika Mukherjee	Ek Akasher Niche; Pratibimbo
2016–present	Swastika Dutta	Bhojo Gobindo; Bijoyinee; Ki Kore Bolbo Tomay; Professor Vidya Banerjee
2016–present	Soumitrisha Kundu	Mithai
2009–present	Sohini Sarkar	Ogo Bodhu Sundori; Adwitiya; Bhumikanya
2005–present	Tina Datta	Durga
2018–present	Tiyasha Roy	Krishnakoli
2016–present	Trina Saha	Khokababu; Koler Bou; Khorkuto; Balijhor; Love Biye Aaj Kal; Parshuram Ajker Nayok
2012–present	Tumpa Ghosh	Bidhir Bidhan; Raage Anurage; Bedini Moluar Kotha; Agnijal; Jai Kali Kalkattawali; Rangiye Diye Jao; Nishir Daak; Trishul
2002–present	Ushashie Chakraborty	Sreemoyee
2017–present	Ushasi Ray	Milon Tithi; Bokul Kotha; Kadambini

- Grihoprobesh

== English ==
Years	Artist	Series/ title(s)	Role	Network	Notes
2021	Sonia Rathee	Broken But Beautiful; Decoupled	Rumi Desai; Masha	ALTBalaji; Netflix	Season 3, all 10 episodes Season 1, episodes 3–8
