= Vaidehi =

Vaidehi may refer to:

- Of, from or related to the ancient Indian kingdom of Videha
  - Vaidehi, another name for Sita of Rāmāyaṇa
  - Queen Vaidehi, mother of king Ajatashatru
- Vaidehi (2006 TV series), also known as Vaidehi – Ek Aur Agni Pareeksha, a 2006 Indian Hindi-language television series
- Vaidehi (2013 TV series), a 2013 Indian Tamil-language family drama television series
- Vaidehi (Kannada writer) (born 1945), Indian Kannada-language writer
- Vaidehi, stagename of Indian actress Delna Davis in Tamil films
- Vaidehi Rao, a fictional character portrayed by Anita Date in the 2018 Indian film Tumbbad
