= En Iniya Thozhiye =

- Promotional logo
- என் இனிய தோழியே
- Genre: Soap opera Drama
- Directed by: Gopi.R
- Starring: Srithika; Apsar; Ekavalli; Jeyaram
- Country of origin: India
- Original language: Tamil
- No. of seasons: 1
- No. of episodes: 578

Production
- Production location: Chennai
- Camera setup: Multi-camera
- Running time: approx. 20-22 minutes per episode
- Production company: Sri Barati Associate

Original release
- Network: Raj TV
- Release: 10 November 2014 – 26 February 2016

En Iniya Thozhiye (transl. "My dear and cordial friend") is an Indian Tamil-language soap opera that aired Monday through Friday on Raj TV from 10 November 2014 to 26 February 2016 at 9PM IST for 578 episodes.

The show starred Srithika, Apsar, Ekavalli and Jeyaram. It was produced by produced by Sri Barati Associate and directed by Gopi.R. It also airs in Sri Lanka Tamil Channel on Nethra TV and In Canada Tamil Channel on Tamil Entertainment Television.

== Plot ==
En Iniya Thozhiye is a story about two women from extreme status of the society, where the rich woman hates love and the woman from middle class background praises love. Love, immaterial to the place it belongs, can be found beautiful, which forms the crux of their marriage.

== Cast ==
=== Main cast ===
- Reshma Pasupuleti and Srithika as Pari Sathya (Sathya's wife, Ekavalli's friend)
- Aravind and Apsar as Sathya (Pari's husband, Prasana's friend)
- Apsara and Ekavalli as Sandhya Prasana (Prasana's wife, Pari's friend)
- Jeyaram as Prasana (Ekavalli's husband, Sathya's friend)

=== Additional cast ===
- Meenakshi
- Shilpa
- Kiruthika
- Kannan
- Ravivarma
- Vijayalakshmi
- Ramya
- P.Gopalan
- A.Ravikumar

=== Former cast ===
- Reshma Pasupuleti as Pari
- Guru Aravind as Sathya
- Apsara as Sandhya
- Nalini
