= Kula Deivam (TV series) =

2015 TV series

- Genre: Soap opera
- Written by: Dialogue by Arumugam.karu
- Screenplay by: Baskar Sakthi
- Directed by: Thirumurugan
- Creative director: Thirumurugan
- Starring: T. S. B. K. Moulee; Vadivukkarasi; Srithika Saneesh; Surjith Ansary; Nikitha Murali; Sangavi Jeyachandran
- Theme music composer: Sanjeev Rathan
- Opening theme: "Achuvellam Pacharasi Mavilakku"
- Composer: Sanjeevrathan
- Country of origin: India
- Original language: Tamil
- No. of seasons: 1
- No. of episodes: 897

Production
- Producers: Saroja Muniyandi; Jyothi Thirumurugan
- Cinematography: Sarath Chandar
- Editors: Prem; Manikandan Ravi
- Camera setup: Multi-camera
- Running time: approx. 20-22 minutes per episode
- Production company: Thiru Pictures

Original release
- Network: Sun TV
- Release: 11 May 2015 – 13 April 2018

Kula Deivam is an Indian Tamil-language soap opera directed by Thirumurugan and starring T. S. B. K. Moulee, Vadivukkarasi, Nikitha Murali and Srithika Saneesh. It was broadcast on Sun TV from Monday to Saturday from 11 May 2015 to 13 April 2018 for 897 Episodes.

== Synopsis ==
It follows the story of the couple Sundram and Gnanambal who stays together with their children and grandchildren. Problems arise in their close-knit family when the different generations clash with each other.

Gnanambal lives in a village with her daughter Alamelu, who loves her very much. In the same village, resides her other two elder children, Doraipandi and Mangalasundari. Doraipandi is married to Nirmala and has two sons, Amudhan and Vetrivel. Mangalasundari is married to Karunakaran who works in the ships, and they have two daughters, Kayalvizhi and Velvizhi. Both Doraipandi and Mangalasundari hate their mother Gnanambal, believing her to be a woman of low-dignity, due to a misunderstanding in an incident in the past. Gnanambal longs for their love, but they have no respect for her. They are also not fond of Alamelu staying with her, and forbid their children from meeting or interacting with her. Doraipandi believes that his mother’s actions are the reason that their father, Sundaram left them.

In reality, Sundaram, lives as Arunachalam in Chennai, and is a big businessman. He has two children, Keshav and Kalpana. Keshav is married to Aarti, and have to children, the spoilt brat Rohit and Ananya. Kalpana is married to Agustine and they have 3 daughters, Shreya, Shruti and Shewtha. Actually, Sundram assumed the name Arunachalam after his friend. Years ago, Sundaram left Ganambal and his children in search of work. He meets Arunachalam, a street vendor and works in his shop and befriends him. Arunachalam married a woman, against her parents’ wishes, and both eloped. They have two children Keshav and Kalpana, whom he had not met yet. He is due to meet them in a few days time. In a turn of events, Arunachalam is killed by his village people and Sundaram, wearing glasses just like Arunachalam, is assumed as their father by Keshav and Kalpana. Not wanting to hurt the children’s feelings, Sundaram becomes Arunachalam.

Not knowing any truth, Alamelu works in Arunachalam’s office. Slowly the truth comes out. The grandchildren are happily united. Doraipandi and Managala too get to know that their mother was framed by a worker in the past and unite with her. While Kalpana turns over a new leaf and agrees to share the property with Doraipandi, Mangala and Alamelu, Keshav resists. Many events occur and in the end the family reunites and the show ends with Alamelu’s marriage with Aadhavan.

== Cast ==
=== Main ===
- T. S. B. K. Moulee as Sundaram/Arunachalam (Male lead)
- Vadivukkarasi as Gnanambal Sundaram (Female lead)
- Srithika Saneesh as Alamelu Sundaram (Female lead)
- Sharvan Rajesh as Aadhavan
- Nikitha Murali as Aavani

=== Supporting ===
- Anjana K R / Ranjana Nachiyaar as Kalpana Augustine
- Raghavan Durairaj as Karunakaran
- Ashwanth Karthi as Mahendran
- D.S.Parthi as Boopalan
- Aravamudhan as Augustine
- Sateesh Kumar as Keshav Arunachalam (Main Antagonist; Died in Serial, killed by Aarthi)
- Rani as Aarthi Keshav
- Shanthi Arvind as Mangalasundari Karunakaran
- Surjith Ansary as Amudhan Doraipaandi
- Sangavi Jeyachandran as Kayalvizhi Karunakaran, Harshan’s ex-wife
- Bavithran G (Bavithran.Bavin) as Rohit Keshav, Keshav’s son, Manmadhan
- Sreepriya Ilayaraj as Keerthy Rohit, Rohit’s late wife
- Hema Rajkumar as Shobana
- Padmini Saravanan as Shobana's Mother
- R.J Shoba as Nimmu alias Nirmala Doraipaandi
- B.Venkat Subramanian as Nathan
- S.Rajasekar as Peter, Augustine Father
- Vara Lakshmi as Esther, Augustine Mother
- VJ Sasikala Nagarajan as Seetha
- Giridhar Thirumalachary as Sivagiri (Nathan's father)
- Jayashree Nair as Nathan's mother
- Kannan as Niranjan, Psycho Killer (Antagonist, Jailed)
- Ashok Kumar as Daas
- Ganesh Babu as Doraipaandi
- Birla Bose as Arunachalam (Killed by Thyagu)
- Rajkanth as Inspector Ranjith (Antagonist; Died in serial, Killed by Gnanambal)
- Ganesh SD as 'Fresh' Praveen (Antagonist; Jailed)
- Sreedharan Gopalan as Harshan, Kayalvizhi’s ex-husband
- Aishwarya Ramsai as Ananya Keshav
- Madhumitha Illayaraja as Velvizhi Karunakaran
- Geetha Narayanan as Kodeeswari
- K.G.Vinodkumar as Engineer Saravanan (Antagonist; Died in serial, Killed by Thyagu)
- Ishitha Varsha as IPS Shenbaga (Assistant Commissioner of Police)
- Kavya as Sudha (Killed by Inspector Ranjith)
- Yazar Hammed as Vetrivel Doraipaandi
- Kaviya as Shreya Siddharth
- Dacutt as Siddharth
- Ashwin Kumar as Arjun
- Pavithra Janani as Shruthi
- Boopathy Raja as Thyagu (Antagonist; Died in serial, Killed by Gnanambal)
- Iyappan Unni as Gokul (Software Engineer)
- Anu Parami / Premi as Thangam
- Sivalingam Babu as Aadhavan's father
- Revathee Shankar as Aadhavan's mother
- Karthik as Perumal
- Muneesh Raja as Mumoorthy (Mumu)
- Arunadevi as Young Gnanambal
- Devi Teju as Lathika (Aarthi's friend, Died in Serial, killed by Niranjan)
- Krishna Kumar as Lathika's Husband

== Production ==
Speaking about the series, director Thirumurugan said, "Unlike Nadhaswaram, which was entirely shot in a small village, Kula Deivam will have a city connect. There are two families -one is in the rural areas and the other is from the city. How these two families function differently is the main plot of this mega series. I have also sketched characters from three different generations. How they connect with each other is also one of the plots."

== Original soundtrack ==
=== Title song ===
It was written by lyricist Palani Bharathi, composed by music director Sanjeev Rathan, and was sung by Anand, Anitha Karthikeyan.

=== Soundtrack ===
Track list
No.	Title	Lyrics	Singer(s)	Length
1.	"Achuvellam Pacharasi Mavilakku (அச்சுவெல்லம் பச்சரிசி மாவிளக்கு)"	Palani Bharathi	Anand, Anitha Karthikeyan	3:26

== Ratings ==
According to BARC ratings (Tamil Nadu + Puducherry)' Mega Serial household television ratings, the pilot episode week of That's Kula Deivam earned a averaging 13.8% rating. While the final episode week scored an 8.5% rating. It became one of the most watched tamil television program. In week 42 of 2017 and the following week, it was at fifth and fourth position.

== Awards and nominations ==
Year	Award	Category	Recipient	Result
2018	1st Galatta Nakshathra Awards	Best Actress	Srithika	Nominated
2018	1st Galatta Nakshathra Awards	Best Supporting Actor	T. S. B. K. Moulee	Won
2018	1st Galatta Nakshathra Awards	Best Supporting Actress	Rani	Nominated

== See also ==
- List of programs broadcast by Sun TV
