= Uravugal Sangamam =

- Genre: Drama
- Directed by: Vijay. S.Kumar
- Starring: Yuvarani; Vadivukkarasi; Shyam Ganesh; Abser; Durga; Pooja
- Theme music composer: Babu Ganesh
- Opening theme: "Uravugal Sangamam" by Sukanya
- Original language: Tamil
- No. of episodes: 375

Production
- Camera setup: Multi-camera
- Running time: approx. 20-21 minutes per episode
- Production company: Sri Barati Associate

Original release
- Network: Raj TV
- Release: 14 October 2013 – 13 September 2014

Uravugal Sangamam is a soap opera that aired on Raj TV. The show premiered on 14 October 2013 and aired Monday through Saturday at 9:30pm and the show was shifted to 8:30pm time Slot. The show starring by Yuvarani, Vadivukkarasi, Shyam Ganesh, Durga, Pooja, Devikiruba, Nagalakshmi, S.Kavitha, Dev, Abser, Ajay Rathnam and Pandu. The story revolved around the families, especially, the three families, which were considered as main in the serial.

The serial is produced by Bharathi Associates and directed by Vijay. S.Kumar. The serial had the privilege of actress Sukanya lending her voice to the title song, for the music scored by Babu Ganesh. The show last aired on 13 September 2014 and ended with 375 episodes.

== Cast ==
- Srithika
- Bharathi
- Yuvarani
- Vadivukkarasi
- Shyam Ganesh
- Abser
- Venkat
- Durga
- Pooja
- Devikiruba
- Nagalakshmi
- S.Kavitha
- Dev
- Ajay Rathnam
- Pandu
- Azhagu
- Nithya
- Sujatha
- Kumaresan
- Shanthi Williams
- Rajsekar
- Shobana
- Ramya

== International broadcast ==
- It also aired in Sri Lanka Tamil Channel on Nethra TV.
