= Uyirmei =

- Genre: Soap opera medical
- Directed by: Sundar K. Vijayan (25-122); Bhushan (001-025)
- Creative director: V.Priya
- Starring: Amala; Praveen; Vineeth; Srithika; Harshita; Bharat Kalyan
- Theme music composer: Dharan Kumar (Title Song); Rehan (Background Score)
- Opening theme: Uyirgalai Nesi (Vocals); Haricharan; Monisha; Snehan (Lyrics)
- Country of origin: India
- Original language: Tamil
- No. of seasons: 1
- No. of episodes: 122

Production
- Producer: Ramesh
- Production location: Tamil Nadu
- Running time: approx. 20-22 minutes per episode
- Production company: Global One Studios

Original release
- Network: Zee Tamil
- Release: 18 August 2014 – 30 January 2015

Uyirmei is a Tamil medical soap opera that aired on Zee Thamizh. The series is apparently inspired by American medical drama ER. The plot revolves around the lives of some doctors, their lives, families and patients. The show premiered on 18 August 2014.First the director was Bhushan but after a couple of episodes Sundhar.K.Vijayan started to direct. Starting from Monday 24 November 2014, the show was shifted to 7pm time Slot. Its episodes ended on 30 January 2015 with 112 episodes.

== Plot ==
Dr Dayananad, founder of Dayanand medical foundation, gives the power of attorney to Kavitha (Amala) but after some hours Dayanand falls ill. Kavitha manages the situation but problem ensues when the sons and daughters of Dayanand comes and irritates to give the power of attorney to them. To irritate her, the sons take Dayanand to Singapore Hospital. After a long fight, a shocking news arrives to them that Dayanand has died. The rest of the story follows how Kavitha struggles to maintain the hospital and safeguard from the sons of Dayanand.

== Cast ==
- Amala as Dr. Kavitha Sandeep, Head of Emergency Care
- Srithika as Dr. Bhuvana Natrajan, a Junior Consultant in Internal Medicine
- Vineeth as Tamilselvan, a surgical intern
- Praveen as Doctor Mano Arunmani, a Junior Consultant in General Surgery
- Gibran Osman as Dr. Karan Bhalla, a pediatrician
- Harsitha as Jenny, a nurse
- Bharat Kalyan as Sandeep, Kavitha's husband
- Revathy Shankar as Sandeep's Mother
- Pooja Lokesh as Pooja, Sandeep's Ex Girlfriend
- Chandra Mohan
- Vatsala Rajagopal
- Reshma Pasupuleti as Sumathi

== Production ==
The series was created by director Bhushan Kalyan who had earlier apprenticed under acclaimed filmmaker Mani Ratnam in films such as Iruvar (1997). Kalyan's wife and director V. Priya, who has also assisted Ratnam, serves as the creative director. Actor and entrepreneur Gibran Osman was roped in to play a pediatrician, a character which is likeable and an instant hit with his patients. First the director was Bhushan but after a couple of episodes Sundhar.K.Vijayan started to direct. Even Gibran was removed.

Principal photography began in July 2014 in Chennai. The shooting was held at Ambattur where a sprawling set of an hospital was erected by art director and production designer Thota Tharani. The first episode was aired on 18 August 2014 in the satellite channel Zee Tamil.
