= Srithika =

Indian actress (born 1987)

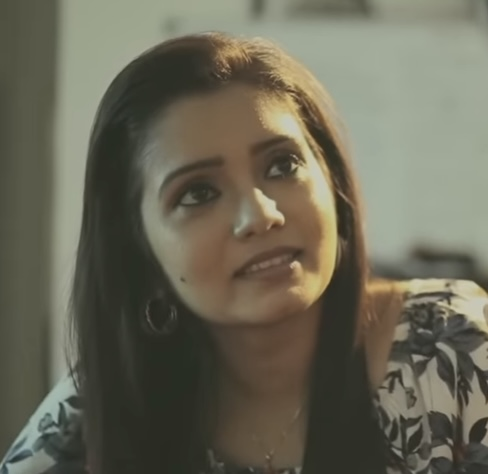
- Srithika in 2017
- Born: January 22, 1987 (age 39); Malaysia
- Other name: Sri
- Occupations: Actress; Model
- Years active: 2009–present
- Spouse(s): Saneesh (m. 2019 - 2021) SSR Aaryan (m. 2024)
- Relatives: Sudha (Sister)

Srithika is an Indian actress who appears in Tamil films and television serials.

== Biography ==
Srithika lived and studied in Malaysia, where her father was a businessman, before she settled in Chennai. She was able to find roles in commercials through her elder sister Sudha, who worked as a TV hostess and currently works in serials as well. She went on to appear in films, including Vennila Kabadi Kuzhu and Madurai to Theni Vazhi Aandipatti (2009). But it's on the small screen that she had her big break: from 2010 to 2015, she played the role of Malar in the popular soap opera Nadhaswaram. She has since acted in other TV shows, including Mamiyar Thevai, Uravugal Sangamam and Kula Deivam.

== Television ==
Serials

Year	Title	Channel	Language
		Sun TV	Tamil
2008–2009	Kalasam	Sun TV	Tamil
2008–2009	Gokulathil Seethai	Kalaignar TV	Tamil
2010–2015	Nadhaswaram	Sun TV	Tamil
2013	Mamiyar Thevai	Zee Tamil	Tamil
2013–2014	Uravugal Sangamam	Raj TV	Tamil
2013–2014	Vaidehi	Jaya TV	Tamil
2014–2015	Uyirmai	Zee Tamil	Tamil
2015–2018	Kula Deivam	Sun TV	Tamil
2015–2016	En Iniya Thozhiye	Raj TV	Tamil
2018–2020	Kalyana Parisu 2	Sun TV	Tamil
2019	Azhagu	Sun TV	Tamil
2020	Magarasi	Sun TV	Tamil
2021–2023	Magarasi	Sun TV	Tamil
2021	Sundari	Sun TV	Tamil
2021–2023	Aa Okkati Adakku	Gemini TV	Telugu

Shows

Year	Title	Role	Channel	Language
2019	Vanakkam Tamizha	Herself	Sun TV	Tamil
2020	Vanakkam Tamizha	Herself	Sun TV	Tamil
2021	Vanakkam Tamizha	Herself	Sun TV	Tamil
2021	Poova Thalaya	Contestant	Sun TV	Tamil
2021	Vanakkam Tamizha	Herself	Sun TV	Tamil
2021	Poova Thalaya	Contestant	Sun TV	Tamil
2021	Thalai Deepavali	Bharathi	Sun TV	Tamil
2021	Vanakkam Tamizha	Herself	Sun TV	Tamil
2022	Puthande Varuga	Herself	Sun TV	Tamil
2022	Maathi Yosi	Contestant	Sun TV	Tamil
2022	Anbe Aaruyire	Contestant	Sun TV	Tamil
2022	Maathi Yosi	Contestant	Sun TV	Tamil
2022	Vanakkam Tamizha	Herself	Sun TV	Tamil
2022	Mathappu Mamiyar Pattas Marumagal	Bharathi	Sun TV	Tamil
2022	Vanakkam Tamizha	Herself	Sun TV	Tamil

=== Short films ===
Year	Title	Role	Web Channel	Language	Notes
2019	Thuppukettavan	Malar	M.Thirumurugan channel (Thiru Tv)	Tamil	
2020	Angelina	Madhubala	Galatta Originals	Tamil	

=== Tamil album songs ===
Year	Album	Role	Music Director	Produced by	Language	Notes
2025	Aazhi	Singer	SSR Aaryann	Vasanth Ramasamy	Tamil	Album for Giant Music India

== Filmography ==
Year	Title	Role	Notes
2008	Mahesh, Saranya Matrum Palar		Debut film
2009	Vennila Kabadi Kuzhu	Silku Sinkarari	
2009	Madurai to Theni Vazhi Aandipatti		
2011	Venghai	Selvi	

Dubbing artist

- Saranya Mohan - Yaaradi Nee Mohini (2008), Eeram (2009)

== Awards ==
- Sun Kudumbam Awards 2012 – Best Marumagal for Nadhaswaram
- Sun Kudumbam Awards 2014 – Devathaigal (Special award) for Nadhaswaram
