= Mamiyar Thevai =

- மாமியார் தேவை
- Genre: Soap opera
- Written by: N.Krishnaswamy
- Screenplay by: Baba Kendy
- Directed by: Kuruvidurai K.J.Thangapandiyan (1-45); Sulaimaan K.Babu (46-244)
- Creative director: N.Seetha
- Starring: Yuvarani; Subhalekha Sudhakar
- Country of origin: India
- Original language: Tamil
- No. of seasons: 1
- No. of episodes: 244

Production
- Producers: Dhanushajekrishna; Aishwaryaajekrishna
- Running time: approx. 20-22 minutes per episode

Original release
- Network: Zee Tamil
- Release: 15 April 2013 – 21 February 2014

Mamiyar Thevai is a 2013 Indian Tamil-language soap opera that aired on Zee Tamil. The show premiered on 15 April 2013 and aired Monday through Friday 8:00PM IST. The show stars Yuvarani, Subhalekha Sudhakar, Srithika, Mahalakshmi, Vandhana and Sonia. It was directed by Sulaimaan.K.Babu. The show last aired on 21 February 2014 with 244 episodes.

== Plot ==
It is the story of a joint family, which consists of a father, three sons, three daughters-in-law and their children. The father lost his wife few years ago. He now wants to retire and the sons want the family property to be divided. While his children are keen on the property, issues arise in the family. He is devastated and his youngest daughter-in-law, Meera, helps him out with a surprising solution. She suggests a mother-in-law for the family and a wife for him. In the course of a series of events that follow, she starts the hunt for an appropriate mother-in-law and in the process finds Gayathri. Meera feels Gayathri is the right person to handle all the people and sort out all the problems in the household. Meera, who has been brought up in an orphanage, has a past which haunts her often.

== Cast ==
- Yuvarani as Gayathri
- Srithika as Meera
  - Mahalakshmi replaced Srithika
- Subhalekha Sudhakar
- Sonia
- Vandhana
- Kumaresan
- Sukiran
- Viswanath
