= Magarasi =

Indian television series

- Genre: Soap opera
- Directed by: S.P Rajkumar(1–80); N. Sundareshwaran (81–1036)
- Creative director: Hari Bhaskaran Rathinam
- Starring: Srithika Saneesh; S.S.R Aaryann
- Theme music composer: Krish
- Opening theme: "Yela Yelaaamma Sontham paramma Magarasi Neethan Amma"
- Composer: Krish
- Country of origin: India
- Original language: Tamil
- No. of seasons: 1
- No. of episodes: 1036

Production
- Executive producer: Jaganatham
- Producers: Anuradha Sarin; R.Sathish kumar
- Production location: Tamil Nadu
- Cinematography: Ma.Ilayaraja
- Editor: Mahesh Babu
- Camera setup: Multi-camera
- Running time: 20–22 minutes
- Production companies: Sun Entertainment Citram Studios

Original release
- Network: Sun TV
- Release: 21 October 2019 – 1 July 2023

Magarasi (Translate: woman of elegance/graceful daughter-in-law) is a 2019-2023 Indian-Tamil language television soap opera that premiered on 21 October 2019 on Sun TV and ended on 1 July 2023. It is available for worldwide streaming on Sun NXT. The show is produced by Citram Studios. It stars Divya Sridhar/ Srithika Saneesh and SSR Aaryann in lead roles.

== Plot ==
Tamizh, a rich Chidambaram based IT employee leaves Haridwar with his child by train. When the train departs from Haridwar, Bharathi gets the train with the help of Tamizh. They both introduced themselves and Tamizh narrated his tragic love marriage life to Bharathi. Tamizh initially had left his joint family and refused to marry both of his cousins to marry Ragini, his colleague. This made his mother fall into a coma. But Ragini wanted to lead a luxurious life and spent all his money in vain. This leads to a big misunderstanding between them and they got separated. Bharathi introduced herself to Tamizh that she is from Haridwar, and will tell the rest on one fine day. She insists to travel with him until Chidambaram. There, by seeing Tamizh with the child and girl, his family thinks that Bharathi would be his wife. Everyone shows affection towards her and consider her as Magarasi of the family. She too tries to get Tamizh's mother up from the coma. And she succeeds in that too. This reduces the gap between Tamizh and his father. One day Tamizh gets to know that Bharathi is already married.

Everyone starts to live like a single family. Though Bharathi mingled in the family, she is not happy and always feels that her position, affection, love from the family belong to another girl, Ragini. She attempts a couple of times to leave the home but does not succeed.

One day, Tamizh's friend shows a trending video of Bharathi, who was chased by some henchmen of her uncle Pandian. So Tamizh insists Bharathi reveal the truth. Bharathi who was too rich lived with her husband Puvi. They both believed that helping the needy is the best way to reach God. But Pandian and his nephew Mithun showed her wrong accounts and manipulated her property. Puvi suspected them and informed Bharathi. But Bharathi blindly believed her uncle. When Bharathi identified their originality, they wanted to kill Bharathi and Puvi. In the event, Bharathi escaped and got a train to Chennai.

Now at the present Tamizh and Bharathi become good friends and Tamizh helps Bharathi to save her property and Puvi.

One day, Tamizh's parents arranged a marriage for Tamizh and Bharathi unknown relationship. Ragini came to the scene and Bharati falls unconscious, made the marriage stop there. Tamizh's mother went to ask why her son's life with Bharathi is not that good at a priest and he revealed the truth that Bharathi is her first daughter in law that means Puvi is Tamizh's biological elder brother

In (Divya Sridhar). last episode, Bharathi met with an accident. It makes her face damaged. She had a face transplant and get a new face (Srithika Saneesh). In the accident, she also lost her memory. Now, the story continued with Bharathi's new face and her name also changed as "Shakthi". Malliga, a village girl accidentally marries Puviarasan when he was disguised as Anbu without his old memories about the past. Nandan, the brother of Malliga changed the face of Bharathi by face transplant and made her believe as Shakthi. However Shakthi regained her memories as Bharathi and joined again with Puviarasan's family. After knowing the truth that Bharathi is still alive, Malliga decided to leave Puviarasan and went back to her village. After series of events, Malliga discovers about her birth from a doctor named Sujatha, that Malliga was not a village girl but she was born in Haridwar and Bharathi is her twin sister. Sujatha was the gynecologist doctor and a close friend of Bharathi and Malliga's mother. Knowing this truth, Malliga becomes very happy and decided to be the surrogate mother for Bharathi and Puviarasan's baby due to Bharathi unable to beget a chids due to the accident. But Malliga does not reveal this matter to bharathi and her family. Eventually Malliga marries Tamizharasan the brother of Puviarasan due to Chidamabaram family misunderstood that Malliga was carrying tamizharasan's child in her womb. Meanwhile Bharathi discovers the whereabouts of her mother Durga and made her stay in Chandrika's house. Actually Chandrika was the wife of Senthoorapandian who was the guardian of Bharathi in Haridwar and wanted to amass her wealth by killing her and Puviarasan. Senthoorapandian eventually dies in a mishap while escaping from police custody and Chandrika wanted to take revenge on Bharathi and Puviarasan's family because she considered Bharathi as the indirect reason for her husband's death. She plots eventually to take revenge on Bharathi and Chidambaram's family.

== Cast ==
=== Main ===
- Divya Sridhar / Srithika Saneesh as Bharathi Puviarasan(Magarasi of Chithambaram Family)
- SSR Aaryann as Puviarasan (Puvi) Chidambaram (Shenbagam and Chidambaram elder son)

=== Recurring ===
- Vijay as Tamilarasan (Tamil) Chidhambaram (Shenbagam and Chidambaram younger son)
- Mounika Devi as Malliga Tamilarasan
- Praveena / Sriranjani as Shenbagam Chidhambaram (Chidambaram 's Wife)
- Deepan Chakravarthy replacement Poovilangu Mohan as Chidhambaram (Shenbagam 's husband)
- Pavithra as Madhavi
- Ashwini replacement Raghavi Sasikumar as Gomathi Gopalan (Gopalan 's Wife Chidambaram youngest daughter)
- Ravishankar as Kathiravan
- Satvik as Rahul Tamilarasan
- Vandhana Michael as Chandrika Senthoora Pandiyan (Main Antagonist)
- Senthilnathan as Pechiappan
- Nethra Shri as Sengamalam
- Keerthana as Durga Bhai
- Ramji as Sivamani
- Riyaz Khan as Senthoora Pandiyan
- Gayathri Priya as Doctor Sujatha
- Mahalakshmi Shankar as Anbarasi Chidhambaram Manohar (Shenbagam and Chidambaram eldest daughter)
- Vijay Anand as "Gethu" Manohar
- Gracy Thangavel as Aburva
- Sivaji Manohar as Gopalan
- Mithun Raj as Mugilan
- Madhumita Illayaraja replacement Shamina Shetty as Illavarasi Chidhambaram (Shenbagam and Chidambaram Youngest daughter)
- Harish G as Velan Gopalan
- Anju Prabhakar as Chamundeshwari
- Sneha Nambiar replacement Swetha as Banumathy Kathiravan
- Vaishali Thaniga as Gayathri Gopalan
- Orma Bose replacement Vinitha Jaganathan replacement Swetha Senthilkumar as Vanmathi Kathiravan
- Feroz Khan as Nandhan Pechiappan
- Gayathri Yuvraaj / Divya Ganesh / Vanitha Hariharan / Ashrita Sreedas as Ragini Tamilarasan

=== Guest appearance ===
- Raghuvaran (Photo Appearance) / Sathish as Puniyamoorthy
- Ammu Ramachandran as Sandhya
- Vaiyapuri as Rajendran
- Srithika Saneesh as herself
- Papri Ghosh as Kayal Kuttisundaram
- Aarthi Subash as Malliga Anbusundaram
- Vasu Vikram as Vishwanathan
- Priya as Meenakshi Vishwanathan

== Development ==
=== Casting ===
Keladi Kanmani's fame Divya Sridhar was selected to portray the lead female role Bharathi but due to her eye injury she was replaced by Nadhaswaram fame Srithika Saneesh from June 2021. SSR Aaryann was cast in the male lead role as Puviarasan. Vijay was cast in the second male lead role as Tamilarasan. The series marks the television debut for SSR Aaryann and Vijay. Praveena was cast in the main lead role as Shenbagam. In 2020, lead Praveena quit the series. Praveena was replaced by Sriranjani. Besides Riyaz Khan, Deepan Chakravarthy, Ramji, Anju, Mounika Devi and Ashwini were cast then.

Post COVID-19 break when the production resumed in July 2020 after three months, Deepan Chakravarthy was replaced by Poovilangu Mohan, Ashwini was replaced by Raghavi Sasikumar, Madhumita Ilaiyaraja was replaced by Shamina Shetty.
