= Yuvarani =

Indian actress (born 1974)

Yuvarani Ravindra
- Born: 30 November 1974 (age 51); Chennai, Tamil Nadu, India
- Occupation: Actress
- Years active: (1991–present)
- Spouse: Ravindra (m. 2000)
- Children: 2

Yuvarani (born 30 November 1974) is an Indian actress. She has appeared in several Tamil films in the female lead role while she has also featured in television serials.

She played Rajinikanth's sister in Baashha, Prabhavathy in the Tamil Serial Chithi, and Sundari in Thendral.

== Controversy ==
In April 2010, Yuvarani won RM70,000 in damages in a defamation suit against two distributors and the publisher of popular monthly magazine Indian Movie News (IMN). She filed the civil suit in 2003 against Percetakan Kum, distributor of IMN in Peninsular Malaysia Mentakab Agency (M) Sdn Bhd, publisher Indian Movie News Publications (M) Sdn Bhd and IMN distributor in Singapore, Indian Movie News Publications P/L. The actress claimed she had been defamed by material printed and published in the Tamil language by the defendants in two issues of IMN, namely the April 1998 and August 1998 issues. She alleged that the materials published were false and done with malicious intent.

== Filmography ==
Year	Film	Role	Notes
1991	Thambi Oorukku Pudhusu	Jayanthi	
1991	Azhagan	Vimala	
1992	Pudhu Varusham	Sevanthi	
1992	Teja		Telugu film
1993	Jathi Malli	Berlin	
1993	Koyil Kaalai	Usha	
1993	Minmini Poochigal	Bhargavi	
1993	Kondapalli Raja	Kamala	Telugu film
1993	Mutha Mestri		Telugu film
1993	Mafia	Sudha	Malayalam film
1993	Senthoorapandi	Meena	
1994	Duet	Student	
1994	Chinna Madam	Meera	
1994	Veeramani	Rakeswari	
1994	Nila	Subha	
1995	Baashha	Geetha	
1995	Pasumpon	Thenmozhi	
1995	Karnaa		Special appearance
1995	Chellakannu	Chandra	
1995	Alibaba Adbhuta Deepam	Indu	Telugu film
1996	Thirumbi Paar	Madhavi	
1996	Mappillai Manasu Poopola	Ponni	
1996	Akkum Bakkum		Telugu film
1997	Sakthi	Raani	
1999	Adutha Kattam	Usha	
2001	Ullam Kollai Poguthae	Lavanya	
2001	Parthale Paravasam	Miss Chennai Host	
2001	Kottai Mariamman	Raani	Tamil film
2002	Solla Marandha Kadhai	Manoranjitham	
2003	Ice	Anjali's mother	
2003	Indru Mudhal	Chakra	
2003	Aasai Aasaiyai	Vinod's sister-in-law	
2008	Silambattam	Duraisingam's wife	
2009	Jaganmohini	Mangayarkarasi	
2010	Thambikku Indha Ooru	Rajasekhar's wife	
2010	Singam	Dhanalakshmi	
2010	Indrasena		
2010	Gowravargal	Thondaiman's wife	
2010	Sura	Samuthira Raja's wife	
2010	Neethana Avan	Vallal's wife	
2010	Kalloori Kalangal	Vasantha	
2010	Thambi Arjuna		
2010	Kotti	Maheswari	
2011	Aadu Puli	Mrs. Thillainayagam	
2012	Ishtam	Sandhya's aunt	
2012	18 Vayasu	Karthik's mother	
2012	Mirattal	Shankar Dhadha's wife	
2013	Singam 2	Dhanalakshmi	
2013	Jannal Oram	Subbaiah's mother	
2014	Azhagiya Pandipuram	Madhavan's sister-in-law	
2014	Endrume Anandham		
2015	Iravum Pagalum Varum		
2015	Kalai Vendhan		
2016	Summave Aaduvom		
2017	Singam 3	Dhanalakshmi	
2018	Kadaikutty Singam	Samyuktha Rani	
2023	Bagheera	Swapna	
2023	Thee Ivan		

== Television ==
Year	Title	Role	Channel	Language
1996–1998	Kadhal Pagadai	Yamuna	Sun TV	Tamil
	Kurangu Manasu	Archana	Sun TV	Tamil
2000–2001	Chithi	Prabhavathi Krishnan	Sun TV	Tamil
	Lava Kusa	Sita		Tamil
2002	Mangalyam	IPS		Tamil
2006–2010	Agni Pravesham	Manjula	Jaya TV	Tamil
2007–2008	Suryavamsam	Nandhini	Sun TV	Tamil
2008	Thiruvillayadal	Indrani	Sun TV	Tamil
2008	Sree Mahabhagavatham	Yashoda	Asianet	Malayalam
2008–2010	Senthurapoove	Easwari Devi	Sun TV	Tamil
2009	Kalyanam	Assistant commissioner of police, Mayawathi	Sun TV	Tamil
2009	Sollathan Ninaikiren		Zee Tamil	Tamil
2010–2013	Thendral	Thirupura Sundhari Laxman	Sun TV	Tamil
2013–2014	Mamiyar Thevai	Gayathri	Zee Tamizh	Tamil
2013–2014	Uravugal Sangamam		Raj TV	Tamil
2014	Mannan Magal	Arundhati	Jaya TV	Tamil
2016–2019	Bharya	Jayaprabha Vishwanathan	Asianet	Malayalam
2016	Pasamalar	Vaitheeswari	Sun TV	Tamil
2017	Lakshmi Kalyanam	Rajarajeswari	Vijay TV	Tamil
2017	Ganga	Kanaka	Sun TV	Tamil
2017–2018	Poove Poochudava	Subhadra	Zee Tamizh	Tamil
2018	Ponnukku Thanga Manasu	Shanthi	Vijay TV	Tamil
2019	Chandrakumari	Rohini Shivanesan	Sun TV	Tamil
2020	Minnale	Kamala Sundaramoorthy / Bhairavi	Sun TV	Tamil

=== Awards and nominations ===
- 2017 : Asianet television awards 2017 - Best Character Actress (Nominations) - Bharya
- 2018 : Asianet television awards 2018 - Best Character Actress (Nominations) - Bharya
