= Sundari Neeyum Sundaran Naanum (TV series) =

Indian Tamil-language television series

- Genre: Soap opera
- Written by: Arun Mohan
- Directed by: Abdul Kabeez
- Starring: Tejashwini Gowda; Vinoth Babu; Ashwanth Thilak; Nalini Nair Ramarajan; Ranjit Babu
- Country of origin: India
- Original language: Tamil
- No. of seasons: 1
- No. of episodes: 405

Production
- Cinematography: Jaya Prakash
- Editor: Muthu
- Running time: Approx. 22 minutes
- Production company: Kala communications

Original release
- Network: Star Vijay
- Release: 22 July 2019 – 20 March 2021

Sundari Neeyum Sundaran Naanum is a 2019 Indian Tamil-language drama television series starring Tejaswini Gowda, Vinoth Babu, Latha and Nalini. It premiered from 22 July 2019 on Star Vijay's Monday to Saturday and on ended on 20 March 2021 after 405 episodes. It was replaced by Raja Paarvai.

== Cast ==
=== Main ===
- Tejaswini Gowda as Thamizharasi: a girl who runs schools in the villages and takes care. She is sweet. She is briefly married to Velumurgan. (2019-2021)
- Vinoth Babu as Velmurugan: aims to become a political leader; briefly married to Thamizharasi. (2019-2021)
- Latha as Vijayalakshmi, Velumurgan's grandmother (episodes 1–220; 2019–2020)
  - Nalini Nair replaced Latha (s221-405) as Vijayalakshmi: She is Velumurgan's grandmother. She cared for him after his parents died. She was shocked when Thamizharasi married Velumurgan. She is gentle and arrogant. (2020–2021)

=== Supporting ===
- Nesan as Thennarasu, Nisha's father
- Ashwanth Thilak(1-325)/Gve Krishna (325-405) as Saravanan, Velmurugan's best friend, Vijayalakshmi's adoptive grandson, and Ezhil's husband.
- Preethi Kumar as Divya, Indrani's daughter and Vijayalakshmi's granddaughter
- Kanya Bharathi as Indrani, Vijayalakshmi's daughter-in-law
- Sahana Shetty as Nisha, Thennarasu's daughter
- Yaar Kannan as Sukumaran, Thamizharasi's grandfather
- Seetha Anil as Chithra, Thamizharasi's mother
- Priyanka as Ezhilarasi, Thamizharasi's first younger sister and Saravanan's wife
- Deepika as Kalaiarasi, Thamizharasi's second younger sister
- VJ Sandhya as Urvashi, Thamizharasi's maternal aunt
- VJ Praveen as the lawyer Prabhakaran Thamizharasi's tenant and family friend
- Ranjith as Deepak, Divya's fiancé and Indrani's business partner
- Elamaran as Elamaran, Velmurugan's sidekick
- Sangeetha V as Sujatha, Vijayalakshmi's daughter

== Crossover episodes ==
- It had a crossover with Ponnuku Thanga Manasu from 27 November 2019 to 2 December 2019. They were hour episodes. The episodes was based on the wedding of Velu and Thamilzharasi (Episodes 108-111). Harrison, the Ponnukku Thanga Manasu director directed this show.
