= Nadhaswaram (TV series) =

Tamil soap opera

- Genre: Drama
- Written by: Thirumurugan
- Directed by: Thirumurugan
- Starring: T. S. B. K. Mouli; Thirumurugan; Poovilangu Mohan; Srithika, Benze, Geethanjali, Revathy, Sruthi, jayasree, Sangavi
- Theme music composer: Sanjeev Rathan
- Opening theme: "Nadhaswaram" (Vocals); Sirkazhi G. Sivachidambaram; Sangeetha Rajeshwaran; Janaki Iyer; Saroja; Karthika; Deepak; Vairamuthu (Lyrics)
- Country of origin: India
- Original language: Tamil
- No. of seasons: 1
- No. of episodes: 1,356

Production
- Producer: Thirumurugan
- Production location: Karaikudi
- Editor: Prem
- Running time: approx. 19-21 minutes per episode
- Production companies: Thiru Pictures & UTV Motion Pictures

Original release
- Network: Sun TV (2010-2015) re-telecast
- Release: 19 April 2010 – 9 May 2015

Nadhaswaram is a Tamil soap opera that aired on Sun TV from 2010 to 2015.

This show starred T. S. B. K. Mouli, Thirumurugan, Poovilangu Mohan and Srithika. It was directed and produced by Thirumurugan. re-telecastied from 15 September 2025 at 09:30AM (Indian Standard Time).

== Plot ==
Nadhaswaram is a story that happens in Pallathur, Karaikudi and revolves around Gopikrishnan, the second son of a large family. Gopi's father, Chokkalingam and paternal uncle Mayilvahanam, are Nadhaswaram players. Gopi is a responsible son of Chokkalingam and Meenakshi. Gopi owns a tailor shop in the town and is close friends with Kaja, his assistant. Gopi has 3 younger sisters, Maheswari, Ragini and Geetha. The 4 siblings have an elder brother, Sivagnanam, who ran away from home after Mayilvahanam scolds him years ago. Mayilvahanam is married to Deivanai and they have three children. The elder is Pandikumar, who is a useless smalltown ruffian, who always picks on fights with the other village youngsters. The other two are girls, Kameshwari and Parmeshwari. Mayilvahanam favours Pandi over his daughters as he believes that girl children are expensive to raise as they must be married off, and that son is an asset. This leads to Mayil to behave abusively with his wife and daughters. Chokkalingam and Mayilvahanam also have another younger brother and younger sister. Their brother, Rasappa is mentally challenged though, he speaks sane sometimes. Their sister, Pushpa, is married to Piraisoodan, a graduate and is a government servant. He works as a postmaster in his village, Peravurani. Piraisoodan thinks low of his brothers-in-laws and degrade them at any chance. Piraisoodan and Pushpa have three children as well. The eldest, Samandham is a comedy man, and totally useless. In the aspect of the show, he is a comical relief together with Kaja. The other two are Mahalakshmi and Sumathi. Maha is in love with her cousin Gopi, but Pandi is in love with Maha. Maheshwari's wedding is arranged with a Selvarangam. Selvarangam and his sister request much dowry from Gopi's family and all. Meanwhile, Kamu's college mate, Moorthy is in love with her, but Kamu keeps distancing herself from him. Gopi meets Malarkodi, an EB engineer and falls in love with her. Though their initial encounters are rocky and funny, Malar too falls for Gopi. Mayilvahanam gets angry on Gopi and disapproves of their relationship. Chokkalingam nevertheless, doesn't object but doesn't say anything as well. Malar hails from an affluent family which consists of her father Jaganathan, mother, elder brother Ashok, sister-in-law Mala, and younger sister Rohini. Maha gets to know about Gopi and Malar, thus she reveals her feelings for Gopi openly. Piraisoodan doesn't have any choice but agrees for the engagement as Maha runs away to her uncle's house. Gopi too agrees due to family pressure. Malar then agrees to marry Gokul. Rohini elopes with Ashok's friend who uses her and runs with her jewel. Gopi recuses Rohini and so does Gokul. Malar then decided to marry Gokul. Gokul is married to Malar and dearly loves her. But he starts becoming too possessive of her and starts to doubt her. Malar breaks her marriage and comes to stay with her parents.

Mahesh's and Selvarangam's life take a big toil after Selvarangam nearly gets jailed. They come and stay with Gopi's family. Pandi, angry at Gopi decides to kill him but injures Maha, who loses her memory. Then at Rameshwaram during a family prayer, Pandi kidnaps and marries Maha. Pushpa berates her brothers and breaks ties with them. Kamu and Moorthy are married. Moorthy's father, Nellaiandavar, wants Gopi to marry Vanitha, his daughter. Paramu's marriage is arranged with Moorthy's brother, Ramesh. Gopi meets Malar during such a time and the get married without their family’ consent. This causes a storm and all the affected families and all chase Gopi and Malar out. The only people who support Gopi and Malar are, Chokkalingam, Pushpa, Gopi's grandmother, Rasappa, Malar's mother, Rohini, Ragini, Geetha and Kaja's family. Gokul is angry and decides to kill Malar and Gopi but they survive in their honeymoon. Gokul then marries Rohini and tortures her. Gopi helps Rohini and Jaganathan accepts him and Malar. Learning her fault, Meenakshi also accepts Gopi and Malar. Maha gains her memories back and hates Pandi. She soon falls for him and asks him to go to work. Pandi's boss kills him and Gopi is blamed. Mayil and Deivanai breaks ties with all and decides to get Paramu married to a rowdy, Kumaru, though Paramu still loves Ramesh.

A lot happens but Paramu and Ramesh get married. Malar's cousin, Shiva and her uncle Raasu get introduced. Shiva marries Rohini but Raasu and Shiva start to target Gopi, whom they hate. They murder a woman Nani and blame Gopi. These happens in Thiruppur. Rohini refuses to believe Malar that Gopi is innocent. When she learns the truth, she commits suicide. Gopi's lost brother, Sivagnanam is known as Prasadh and lives in Malaysia. He befriends Gopi and comes to Pallathur as an engineer. Prasadh and Maha later marry. Prasadh learns the truth of his birth and starts living with his real family. Meenakshi chooses Prasadh over Gopi and Gopi leaves the house.

Finally, Prasadh learns that Gopi is good and only his friends are traitors. He then accepts Ragini and Guhan who got married because of Gopi. Also, Ragini's ex-husband Rajesh dies. All is well. Malar gives birth to a baby boy, and the family finally reunites.

== Cast ==
=== Main characters ===
- Thirumurugan as Gopikrishnan Chokkalingam alias Gopi: Chokkalingam and Meenakshi's second son; Prasad's brother who owns a tailor shop and has an assistant named Kaja. Gopi advises people and he has respect for his family. Gopi fell in love and married to Malar.
- T. S. B. K. Mouli as Chokkalingam alias Chokku

The eldest brother in the family. A very kind-hearted and friendly person who always wants his children to be happy. He treats his nephew and nieces as his children. He does Nadaswaram performance with his brother, Mayilvahanan, to whom he is very close.

- Poovilangu Mohan as Mayilvahanam alias Mayil

younger brother of Chokkalingam. Mayilvahanan loves and trusts his son, Pandi more than his daughters. After the death of his son, he is looking to seek vengeance against Gopi and Chockkalingam. But, he realizes his mistake and receives stroke as a punishment.

- Srithika Saneesh as Malarkodi Gopikrishnan alias Malar : Gopi's wife. She used to work as an engineer in Karaikudi’s Electricity Board

Hers is one of the wealthiest families in Karaikudi. She fell in love and married Gopi secretly without her parents' knowledge. Now, she lives in her in-law's house.

=== Supporting characters ===
- Jeyanthi Narayanan as Meenakshi Chokkalingam

Chokkalingam's wife who treats her husband's nieces as her own children. She favours her eldest son Prasad, and she even went to the extent of chasing Gopi out of the house so Prasad can stay.

- Theni Sathyabama as Deivanai Mayilvahanam

Mayilvahanam's wife. A woman who is almost always not satisfied with what her husband does. She insists her husband to perform Nadhaswaram alone without Chokkalingam but later understood the true good nature of Chokkalingam.

- Pandi Kamal as Pandikumar Mayilvahanam

Mayilvahanam and Deyvanai's one and only son. A useless, irresponsible and rude fellow. He loves Maha and he even tries to rape her for he desires to marry her. He doesn't hesitate to kill Gopi just for Maha. He kidnaps Maha and marries her, and becomes a good person in the process. But, Maha ignores him and doesn't talk to him as he borrowed money from Gopi to satisfy Maha. Then, he is murdered by his boss Veera for discovering his secret of kidnapping and dealing idols and asking him for money, who hangs him on a tree to make his death look like suicide in episode 438, which leads to the enmity between Chokku and Mayilu.

- Revathy damodharan as Maheshwari Selvarangam

Eldest daughter of Chokkalingam and Meenakshi. She is married into a problematic family. She stays with her husband in Chokkalingam's house as her husband was in an illicit relationship with another woman but later her problems are solved.

- Benze Penekline as Kameshwari Moorthy

Mayilvahanam and Deyvanai's eldest daughter. A very decent and quiet girl misunderstood by her father in the beginning due to his love for his son. She is married to her college mate, Moorthy.

- Jayasree as Parameshwari Ramesh

Mayilvahanam and Deyvanai's youngest daughter. A talkative girl in contrast to her sister, Kamu. She even tries to elope with a guy but realised her mistake with the help of Gopi, she is married to Moorthy's younger brother, Ramesh.

- Sruthi Shanmuga Priya as Ragini Guhan

Chokkalingam and Meenakshi's third daughter. Ragini is a very talkative, beautiful and daring girl training to be a beautician in Coimbatore. She was married to Rajesh, who unknown to her was a psychopath. She later divorced him and married to Rajesh's friend Guhan.

- Sangavi as Geetha Chokkalingam

Chokkalingam and Meenakshi's youngest daughter and is in her schooling. These girls help their mother in her flower garland work .

- Sindhu, Vidhya as Rohini Shiva

Malar's sister who behaves like a know it all. She advises her sister but ends up choosing a wrong boyfriend. Her parents compel her to marry her sister's first husband, Gokul. After seeing Gokul's true color, Rohini divorced him and married her uncle's son, Shiva but Shiva and his father took Rohini into their home for obtaining money which Gopi and Malar know about, but Rohini refuse to believe them. However, after knowing about her husband and father in law's true nature, felt guilt ridden and committed suicide.

- Kannan as Gokul

Malar's first husband. He loves Malar initially but begins to suspect her after they tie the knot. He tortures her from the very day they marry. So Malar leaves him and later marries Gopi.

- Rangathurai as Piraisoodan

Married to Pushpa who is the sister of Chokkalingam and Mayilvahanam. He is the Postmaster of Peravurani. He detests his Brothers in law initially considering them to be of lower status than him but gets along well with them later.

- Sutha Prakash as Pushpa Piraisoodan

Wife of Piraisudan. She struggles between her brothers' family and her husband's family. She has a daughter called Maha of whom she is naturally fond of. She neglects her own brothers when it comes to Maha's wellness. She urges Gopi to marry her daughter before his marriage to Malar.

- Gethanjali as Mahalakshmi Prasad

Eldest daughter of Piraisudan and Pushpa. She loves Gopi and decides she would do anything for him. She is forced into a marriage with Pandi when she is mentally ill. After Pandi's death, she understood the love of Pandi to her. Depressed and grieve-strikken, she doesn't want to marry anybody. But after much of her parents' will and Prasad's love to her, she married Prasad.

- Muneesh Raja as Joker of the drama Sammandham Piraisudan

Eldest son of Piraisudan and Pushpa. The He Flirts around and once had a girlfriend named Mayilamma. The youngest daughter of Prasad's Step mother and Sammandham are now in love with each other. They eventually marry each other. He talks in broken English and has a funny way of walking which is the highlight of his character in the drama. He had also turned into an aghori but temporarily.

- Nandhini as Sumathi Piraisudan

Youngest daughter of Piraisudan and Pushpa, who is still schooling.

- Maariappan Raja as Rassapa

Youngest brother of Chokkalingam and Mayilvahanam. He remains a bachelor and an innocent man. He works in a rice mill.

- Thailamma

Mother of the three Brothers and Pushpa. A woman who loves to be independent and lives alone in a house nearby to Pushpa's.

- Prem / Nesan Nepolean as Selvarangam

Maheswari's husband. He runs a rented coconut shop and lives in a rented house but lies to Maheswari that he owns them. Currently he is in good terms with Gopi's family.

- Ravivarman as a Senthil

Ex-lover of Paramu. He cheats her.

- Mahanadi Shankar as Nellai andavar alias Neliandavar

Kamu and Paramu's father-in-law, a man who is portrayed as rough before Moorthy's marriage, but softens after his son's marriage. A strong personality and good hearted, respects Chokkalingam, Mayil and Pushpa's family to the core, also helps Gopi's problems in various situations.

- Neelavathi Neliandavar

Neliandavar's wife.

- Navindhar as Moorthy Neliandavar

Neliandavar and Neelavathi's second son and Kamu's husband. He woes Kamu to marry her. But as time passes he holds no respect for her. Now, he is being with Kamu after realising his mistake and true love from her.

- Sai Shakti, Praveen as Ramesh Neliandavar

Neliandavar and Neelavathi's third son and husband of Paramu. He and his eldest brother forced Neliandaver to separate their shares, and using his money, he did a share trading business, and later started to smuggle diamonds, landing Selvarangam in jail. Unable to bear the embarrassment, Ramesh and Paramu fled to Madurai.

- Roopitha as Vanitha Neliandavar

Moorty's sister who flirts with Gopi when marriage gets fixed for Moorty and Kamu. Later her marriage with Gopi stops as Gopi secretly marries Malar.

- Boopathy Raja as Jeganathan

Malar's Father. He is one of the big-shot in the village.

- Karthik as Kaaja

A loyal boy at Gopi's shop. He is considers as a family member in Gopi's family. He and Rohini are the two of them who stood by Gopi and Malar when they were married.

- Pairoos as Shiva Raasu

Malar's cousin who is married to Rohini

- Sathyamoorty as Raasu

Malar's maternal uncle who is after Jeganathan's property.

- Veerabathran as Palani Saamy

A vengeful guy who wants to kill Gopi because he was caught by the police by Malar and Gopi and Gopi broke his legs.

- Rajkhanth as Sivangnanam Prasad Chokkalingam

The first-born son of Chokkalingam and Meenakshi, also known as Sivangnanam. The truth was revealed recently and created a big ruckus within the family. Meenakshi is furious over the way Prasad's step parents tried to hide the truth from the others. She then outcast them both and Prasad is initially angry with them. Then he calms down and wants to get back to his step-parents as they have nurtured him when he was young. This is clearly not in favour of Meenakshi's desire to stay with her first born son. Prasad is married to Maha and now they are expecting their baby.

- Rajalakshmi : Jeganathan's wife.
- Vijayaraj as Subramani
- Sai Mathavi as Madhavi Subramani

== Production ==
The serial is mostly shot in Karaikudi and has many debutant actors.

== Reception ==
This serial achieved the feat of being the first Indian soap opera to be aired live. This was done to commemorate the Soap opera's 1000th episode on 5 March 2014. By airing a 23-minutes 25 seconds long live telecast in a single shot, the soap opera has earned a place in the Guinness World Records. That episode was shot in the village Pallathur near Karaikudi.
