= Vaidehi (2013 TV series) =

- Genre: Soap opera; Family; Romance; Kids drama
- Written by: Balaji Tele Talks Team
- Directed by: Bashir; Meha V. Saikumar
- Starring: Abbas; Neenu Karthika; Nalini; Srithika; Baby Jena; Gowasal
- Theme music composer: Sagasa Paravai Shankar (Title Song)
- Opening theme: "Mannil Vantha Deivam"; Kavitha (Vocal); Na. Muthukumar (Lyrics)
- Country of origin: India
- Original language: Tamil
- No. of seasons: 1
- No. of episodes: 109

Production
- Camera setup: Multi-camera
- Running time: approx. 20-22 minutes per episode

Original release
- Network: Jaya TV
- Release: 9 September 2013 – 14 February 2014

Vaidehi is an Indian Tamil-language family drama and soap opera television series that aired Monday through Friday on Jaya TV from 9 September 2013 to 14 February 2014 for 109 episodes. It had been receiving the highest ratings of Tamil serials and received high praising from viewers.

The show starred Abbas, Neenu Karthika, Baby Jena, Nalini, Srithika, Gowasal and Sridhar among others. It was produced by Shankaran and Paranitharan, director by Bashir and Meha V. Saikumar.

== Cast ==
=== Main cast ===
- Abbas
- Neenu Karthika
- Baby Jena
- Srithika
- Nalini

=== Additional cast ===
- Gowasal
- Sridhar
- Dev Aanath
- Azhagu
- Tamil
- Shopnam
- Sri Latha
- Sudha
- Durga
- Sujatha
- Baby Pushitha
- Baby Anu Sri

== Title song ==
The theme song was written by lyricist Na. Muthukumar.

=== Soundtrack ===
Tracklist
No.	Title	Lyrics	Singer(s)	Length
1.	"Mannil Vantha Deivam"(மண்ணில் வந்த தெய்வம்)"	Na. Muthukumar	Kavitha	2:00

== Airing history ==
The show started airing on Jaya TV on 9 September 2013 and ended on 14 February 2014.
