= Tumpa Ghosh =

Indian actress

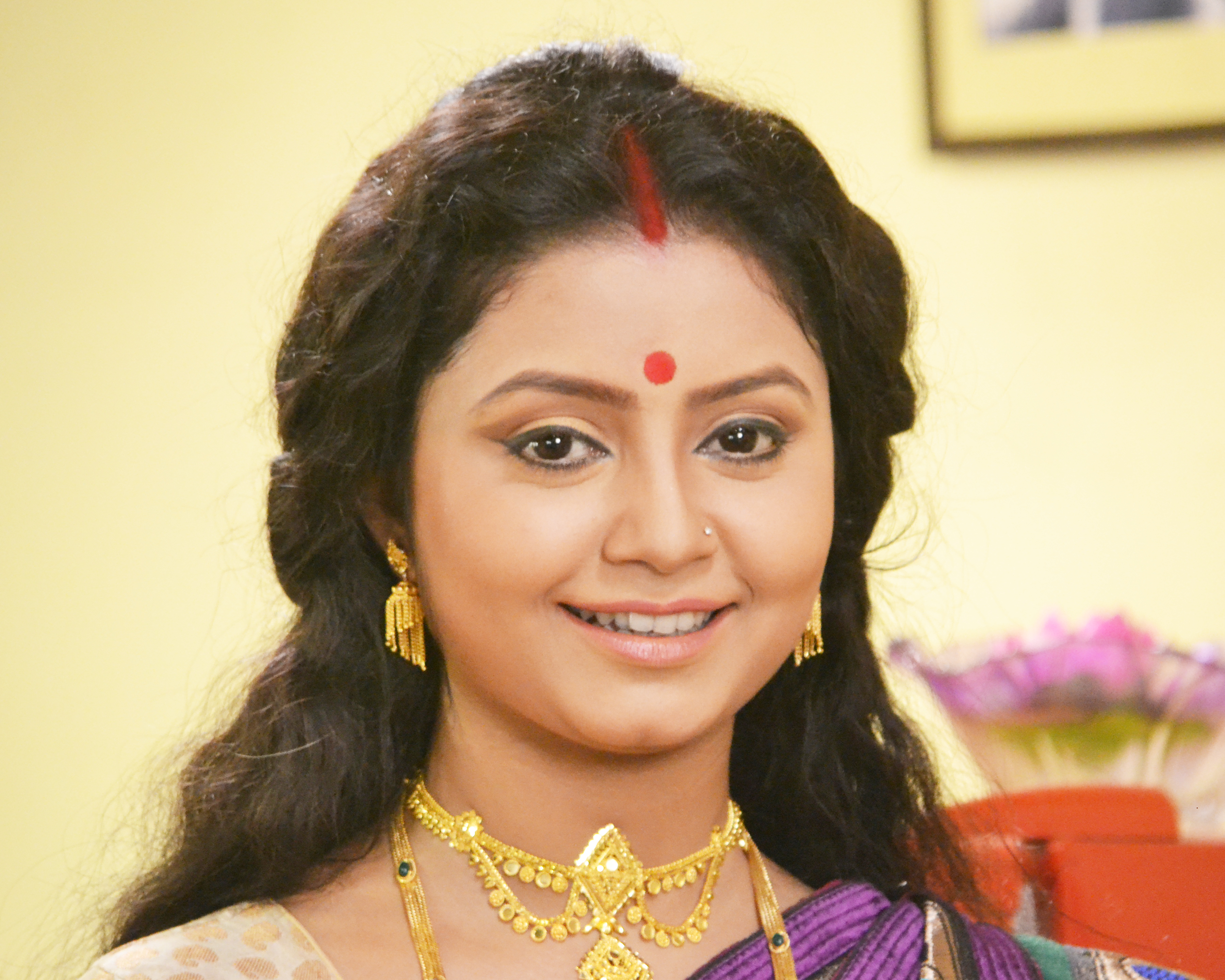
- Occupations: Actress, dancer
- Years active: 2011–present
- Known for: Raage Anuraage; Rangiye Diye Jao; Agnijal

Tumpa Ghosh is an Indian television actress. She is mostly known for her shows Rangiye Diye Jao, Raage Anuraage, Agnijal and many others. Tumpa made her debut as lead actress in Bidhir Bidhan. Her first show with Zee Bangla was Raage Anuraage that was hugely popular and Tumpa was loved by audience for portraying double characters in Raage Anuraage.

Tumpa was last seen as Sreemoyee in Nishir Daak on Colors Bangla. Now Tumpa will be working in Teen Shaktir Aadhar-Trishul on Colors Bangla. Tumpa has also worked on a movie Paan Supari, which premiered on Zee Bangla Cinema.

== Television ==
Year	Serial	Character	Channel	Production House	Notes
2012–2013	Bidhir Bidhan	Shyama	Star Jalsha	Grassroot Entertainment	Lead role
2013–2015	Raage Anuraage	Komol / Kori (Dual Role-Twin Sister)	Zee Bangla	Raj Chakraborty Productions	Lead role / Antagonist
2016	Bedeni Moluar Kotha	Molua	Zee Bangla	Raj Chakraborty Productions	Lead role
2016–2017	Agnijal	Devdasi Souraja / Rani Sourojini	Star Jalsha	Shree Venkatesh Films	Lead role / Antagonist
2017	Jai Kali Kalkattawali	Tanushree	Star Jalsha	Shree Venkatesh Films	Episodic role
2017–2018	Rangiye Diye Jao	Shiuli	Zee Bangla	Chhayabani Balaji Entertainment	Lead role
2018–2020	Nishir Daak	Shreemoyee	Colors Bangla	Shree Venkatesh Films	Lead role
2021–2022	Teen Shaktir Aadhar-Trishul	Durga	Colors Bangla	Blues Productions	Lead role
2023	Shyama	Aritri	Sun Bangla	Surinder Films	Lead role
2025	Geeta LL.B	Parishi	Star Jalsha	Blues Productions	Side Role

== Awards ==
Year	Award	Category	Serial	Role
2014	Tele Somman	Priyo Juti	Raage Anuraage	Komol-Mollar (with Jeetu Kamal)
2015	Zee Bangla Sonar Sansar Award	Priyo Bouma	Raage Anuraage	Komol
2015	Zee Bangla Sonar Sansar Award	Priyo Sasuri-Bouma	Raage Anuraage	Meera-Komol (with Manasi Sinha)
2015	Zee Bangla Sonar Sansar Award	Sera Khalnayika	Raage Anuraage	Kori
2015	Zee Bangla Sonar Sansar Award	Priyo Juti	Raage Anuraage	Komol-Mollar (with Jeetu Kamal)
2015	Tele Academy Awards	Priyo Juti	Raage Anuraage	Komol-Mollar (with Jeetu Kamal)

== Mahalaya ==
Year	Program Name	Character	Channel
2013	Jaago Dashapraharanadharini	Devi Vaishnavi	Zee Bangla
2014	Mahisasurmardini	Devi Mahisasurmardini	Zee Bangla
2021	Nabarupe Mahadurga	Devi Chandraghanta	Colors Bangla

== Movies ==
Year	Movie	Character	Channel
2016	Paan Supari	Phooltushi	Zee Bangla Cinema
