= Payel De =

Bengali actress (born 1986)

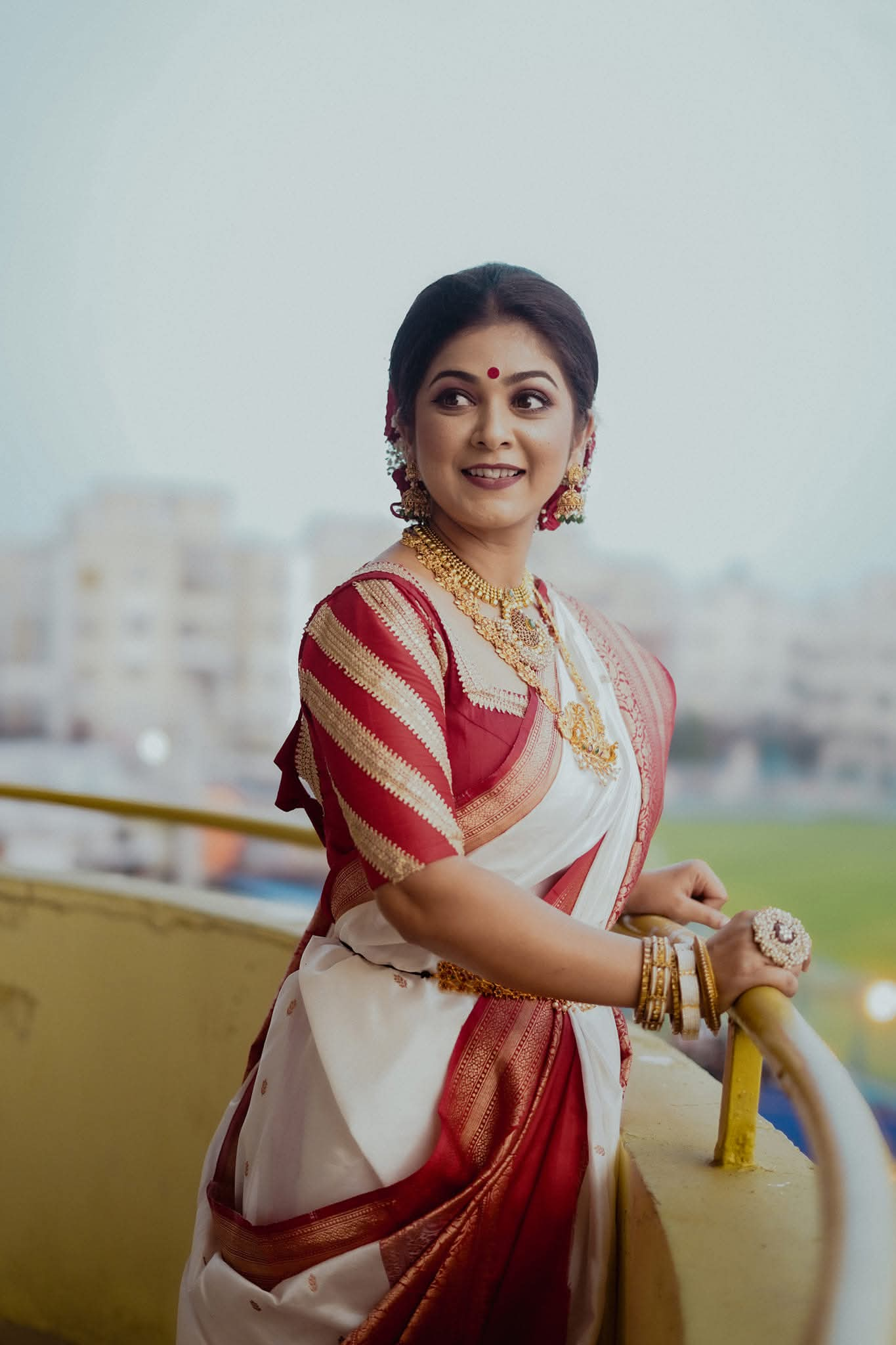
- Born: 18 November 1986 (age 40); India
- Occupation: Actress
- Years active: 2006–present
- Notable work: Durga; Behula; Ramprasad
- Spouse: Dwaipayan Das (m. 2012)
- Children: 1

Payel De (Born 18 November 1986), also known as Payel Dey, is a Bengali actress. She began her career in 2006 with Zee Bangla's Ekdin Pratidin daily soap, where she portrayed Chandrayee as a supporting character. She is known for her work in the Star Jalsha television soap operas Durga and Behula where she played the titular characters. She made her film debut with Mayabazaar.

== Personal life ==
On 3 February 2012, she married her co-actor Dwaipayan Das from the telefilm Sokol Kata Dhonno Kore. They have a son, who was born in 2018.

== Career ==
She started her career while she was studying in college. Afterwards, she starred as Aalo Moitra in the TV serial Bodhu Kon Alo Laaglo Chokhe which aired on Star Jaisha. She has also played lead characters in Maa Durga (Colors Bangla), Tobu Mone Rekho (Zee Bangla), Ardhangini (Star Jalsha), Jaahanara (Colors Bangla), Durga Durgeshwari (Star Jalsha), Chuni Panna (Star Jalsha) and currently Desher Maati (Star Jalsha). She also dubbed for the Bengali movie Fidaa, starring Yash and Sanjana.

Apart from serials, she also played "Goddess Durga" in Mahishashur Mardini (2015) and Durga Durgotinashini (2016) on Colors Bangla. In 2021, she was seen in the film Mukhosh, directed by Birsa Dasgupta, produced under Shree Venkatesh Films, opposite Anirban Bhattacharyya, Anirban Chakraborti and Chandrayee Ghosh.

== Works ==
=== Soap operas ===
Year	Title	Role	Channel	Production House	Notes
2007	Ekdin Pratidin	Chandryee	Zee Bangla	Beyond Reels	Supporting role
2008	Bijoyinee	Akash Bangla			Supporting role
2008	Ichhe Dana	Ichhe	Star Jalsha	Applause Talkies Pvt.Ltd	Lead role
2008–2010	Durga	Sati	Star Jalsha	Shree Venkatesh Films	Supporting role
2010–2011	Behula	Behula	Star Jalsha	Shree Venkatesh Films	Lead role
2012–2014	Bodhu Kon Alo Laaglo Chokhe	Aalo Moitra	Star Jalsha	Shree Venkatesh Films	Lead role
2014–2016	Maa Durga	Maa Durga	Colors Bangla	Shree Venkatesh Films	Lead role
2017	Tobu Mone Rekho	Supriya Roy	Zee Bangla	Shree Venkatesh Films	Lead role
2017	Agnijal	Devi Singhabahini (later replaced by Adrija Roy)	Star Jalsha	Shree Venkatesh Films	Cameo role
2018	Ardhangini	Ganga	Star Jalsha	Acropoliis Entertainment	Antagonist
2018– 2019	Jaahanara	Rubina Sheikh (later replaced by Suranjana Roy)	Colors Bangla	Friends Communication	Supporting roleh
2018	Jai Kali Kalkattawali	Ritoja Moitra	Star Jalsha	Shree Venkatesh Films	Episodic role
2019– 2020	Durga Durgeshwari	Goddess Durgeshwari	Star Jalsha	Shree Venkatesh Films	Supporting role
2019– 2020	Chuni Panna	Madhuja Mallick	Star Jalsha	Shree Venkatesh Films	Supporting role
2020	Prothoma Kadambini	Bhobosundari Ganguly, First Wife of Dwarakanath Ganguly	Star Jalsha	Shree Venkatesh Films	Supporting role
2021	Desher Maati	Ujjaini Mukherjee	Star Jalsha	Magic Moments Motion Pictures	Tertiary Female Lead
2021	Nayantara	Averi	Sun Bangla	Crystal Films	Supporting role
2022	Sona Roder Gaan	Anondi	Colors Bangla	Magic Moments Motion Pictures	Lead role
2023–2024	Ramprasad	Maa Kali	Star Jalsha	Surinder Films	Lead role
2024–2025	Kon Se Aalor Swapno Niye	Alolika Singha Roy	Sun Bangla	Bangla Talkies	Lead role
2025–2026	Chirodini Tumi Je Amar	Rajnandini Singha Roy / Mallika	Zee Bangla	Shree Venkatesh Films	Supporting Role
2026–Present	Lakh Takar Lokkhi Labh Season 3	Herself	Sun Bangla	Sun Bangla In House	Host

=== Films ===
Year	Film	Role	Director	Notes	Source
2021	Mukhosh	Rai Roy	Birsa Dasgupta	First feature film as a lead	
2026	Sadhak Bamakhyapa	Maa Tara	Sayantan Ghoshal		

=== Web series ===
Year	Series	Role	Director	Platform	Notes	Ref.
2021	Indu	Kushi	Sayantan Ghosal	Hoichoi	Debut performance in a web series	
2022	Gora	Supriya	Sayantan Ghosal	Hoichoi	Guest appearance	
2024	Talmar Romeo Juliet	Mousumi	Arpan Garai	Hoichoi		
2026	Queens	Polly Sarkar	Nirjhar Mitra	Hoichoi		

== Awards ==
Year	Award	Category	Character	Name
2013	Star Jalsha Parivaar Award 2013	Sera Bouma	Aalo	Bodhu Kon Alo Laaglo Chokhe
2013	Tele Samman Award	Priyo Juti	Aalo-Sourav	Bodhu Kon Alo Laaglo Chokhe
2014	Star Jalsha Parivaar Award 2014	Priyo Maa	Aalo	Bodhu Kon Alo Laaglo Chokhe

== Mahalaya ==
Year	Title	Role	Channel	Source
2008	Mahisasuramardini	Goddess Swaraswati	Zee Bangla	
2010	Durga Durgatinashini	Goddess Annada and Navadurga	Star Jalsha	
2011	Durga Durgatinashini	Supporting Role	Star Jalsha	
2013	Durgatinashini Durga	Dance Performance	Star Jalsha	
2015	Mahisasurmardini	Goddess Mahisasurmardini	Colors Bangla	
2016	Durga Durgatinashini	Goddess Mahisasurmardini	Colors Bangla	
2023	Yaa Devi Sarbabhutesu	Goddess Kali	Star Jalsha	
2025	Akal Bodhon	Goddess Mahisasurmardini	Sun Bangla	
2026	Abhayashakti-Juge Juge Aparajita	Goddess Koushiki and Chamunda	Sun Bangla	
