= Jaahanara =

- Promotional poster
- Also known as: Jahanara
- Written by: Ashrunu Maitra
- Directed by: Champak Dey; Subrata Sharma
- Creative director: Baabu Banik
- Starring: Shweta Mishra; Ananda Ghosh; Vicky Dev
- Composer: Abhisekh Saha
- Country of origin: India
- Original language: Bengali
- No. of seasons: 1
- No. of episodes: 258

Production
- Running time: 22 minutes
- Production companies: Babu Banik Production; Friends Communication; SVF Acropolis Makers

Original release
- Network: Colors Bangla
- Release: 3 September 2018 – 30 August 2019

Jaahanara is a popular Bengali television soap opera that premiered on 3 September 2018 and aired on Colors Bangla. It was produced by Friends Communication and starred Shweta Mishra, Vicky Dev, Srabani Banik, Ananda Ghosh, and Sumit Samaddar. The show also marked the comeback of Payel De, who was earlier seen on Zee Bangla's Tobu Mone Rekho and Star Jalsha's Ardhangini. The show was based on a Muslim family and Triple Talaque and was dubbed in Hindi as Jaahanara on Rishtey Europe/Colors Rishtey UK from 10 December 2018 to 11 December 2019.

== Series overview ==
What happens when two sisters find themselves trapped in a deceitful marriage, married to the same man? Set against the backdrop of an orthodox society, this is the story of Jahaanara and Rubina, who decide to take on the long-established system of ‘Triple Talaq’. Seeking justice for shackled women everywhere, Jahaanara and Rubina's journey towards freedom is fraught with danger and disasters.

== Plot ==
The story revolves around Nizamuddin Sheikh, a devout but progressive Muslim. He is against conservative practices of his religion. His two daughters, Rubina and Jahaanara, are of different natures. Jahaanara, a lawyer, fights for women who are victims of Triple Talaq. Rubina, meanwhile, marries Ashraf, the son of the rich and powerful Abdul Khan. However, Ashraf likes Jahaanara and gives Talaq to Rubina. What happens next?

== Cast ==
=== Main ===
- Shweta Mishra as Jahanara Shaikh
- Vicky Deb as Ruhaan Khan
- Payel De / Suranjana Roy as Rubina Sheikh: Daughter of Nizamuddin, elder sister of Jahanaara, First wife of Ashraf Khan.
- Ananda Ghosh as Ashraf Khan: Rubina's husband

=== Recurring ===
- Shraboni Bonik as Heena
- Joy Badlani as Abdul Khan
- Debjani Chattopadhyay / Mallika Banerjee as Rukhsar: Abdul's wife
- Kushal Chakraborty as Nizaamuddin Shaikh
- Ashish Deb as Kabir
- Mayna Banerjee as Masha: Ashraf's sister
- Rupam Singha as Munna
