= Anwesha Hazra =

Indian actress

Annwesha Hazra
- Born: December 22; West Bengal
- Occupation: Actress
- Years active: 2017–present
- Known for: Chuni Panna; Amader Ei Poth Jodi Na Sesh Hoy; Anondi

Annwesha Hazra, also known as Anwesha Hazra, is an Indian film and television actress. She made her debut in the year 2017 through Raj Chakraborty's serial Kajal Lata which aired on Colors Bangla. She is best known for the daily television shows Chuni Panna, Amader Ei Poth Jodi Na Sesh Hoy in the lead role, Anondi She made her big screen debut with Mainak Bhaumik's film Cheeni 2 in a supporting role. She then also featured in Manasi Sinha's film 5 No. Swanomoy Lane

== Television ==
=== Serials ===
Year	Serial	Character	Channel	Roles	Notes	Ref.
2017-2018	Kajallata	Kajal	Colors Bangla	Lead Role	Later Replaced by Srijani Mitra	Debut
2018	Aamar Thikana Tai Briddhashram	Roshni	Akash Aath	Supporting Role		
2019	Thakumar Jhuli	Princess Pushpaboti	Star Jalsha	Episodic Role		
2019-2020	Chuni Panna	Chayanika Mallik aka Chuni	Star Jalsha	Lead Role		
2021-2022	Amader Ei Poth Jodi Na Sesh Hoy	Urmi	Zee Bangla	Lead Role		
2023-2024	Sandhyatara	Sandhya	Star Jalsha	Lead Role		
2024–2026	Anondi	Anondi Lahiri	Zee Bangla	Lead Role		

=== Mahalaya ===
Year	Title	Role	Channel	Notes
2022	Singhabahini Trinayani	Devi Mahasaraswati	Zee Bangla	
2025	Jago Maa Jago Durga	Devi Jagaddhatri	Zee Bangla	

== Filmography ==
Year	Film	Character	Director	Notes	Ref.
2023	Cheeni 2		Abhimanyu Mukherjee	Supporting Role	Debut
2024	5 No. Swapnamoy Lane	Dustu	Manasi Sinha	Lead Role	
