= Jai Kali Kalkattawali =

Indian Bengali crime drama series

- Title poster
- Genre: Soap opera Crime Thriller
- Created by: Shree Venkatesh Films
- Screenplay by: Sarbari Ghosal; Dialogues; Saurav Sengupta
- Directed by: Sayan Dasgupta; Swarnendu Samaddar
- Creative director: Sahana Dutta
- Starring: Ananya Chatterjee; Biswanath Basu
- Opening theme: Jai Kali Kalkattawali
- Composer: Upali Chattopadhyay
- Country of origin: India
- Original language: Bengali
- No. of seasons: 1
- No. of episodes: 661

Production
- Producers: Shrikant Mohta; Mahendra Soni
- Production location: Kolkata
- Running time: 22 minutes
- Production company: Shree Venkatesh Films

Original release
- Network: Star Jalsha
- Release: 24 July 2017 – 1 June 2019

Related
- Agnijal; Sreemoyee

Jai Kali Kalkattawali (Bengali: জয় কালী কালকাত্তায়ালি, yāi kālī kālakāttāy.āli) is an Indian Bengali language anthology crime "Chalo Paltai" drama series that premiered on 24 July 2017 starring Ananya Chatterjee and Biswanath Basu. It was produced by Shree Venkatesh Films. It went off-air on 1 June 2019, airing 661 episodes. It was re-aired on Star Jalsha and Star Jalsha HD during lockdown period, due to COVID-19 pandemic.

== Plot ==
Abhaya is a detective who is also a devotee of Goddess Kali, and a saviour in disguise for women. Abhaya was brought up by her in-laws from the age of six after her mother's death due to domestic violence. Her father was a priest of the Mukherjees; he died after leaving her to her in-laws.

The show starts with Abhaya's childhood, where she goes to pray to Goddess Kali but witnesses her mother facing domestic violence, being murdered and burned in fire, which she perceives as a terrible dream. She suddenly wakes up, but the dream of her mother's death constantly haunts her. She is also a devotee of Goddess Kali and a housewife of the Mukherjees. Sometimes, to catch criminals, she disguises herself.

As she confronts it, the story follows Abhaya, a docile homemaker from a traditional Bengali family who crusades against injustice towards women. It shows how she uses her skills to solve crimes and catch criminals while looking after her family.

The show ended with Radharani fixing a time bomb in Abhaya's chair, where Abhaya successfully wins, Radharani dies, and at the very end, it was shown Abhaya saying a few words.

== Cast ==
=== Main ===
- Ananya Chatterjee as Abhaya Mukherjee a.k.a. Mishti - Khokon's wife and Gungun and Topor's mother
- Biswanath Basu as Tathagata Mukherjee a.k.a. Khokon - Gungun and Topor's father, Abhaya's husband
- Aditi Chatterjee as Sarbani Mukherjee a.k.a. Buri - Animesh and Bharati's only daughter

=== Recurring ===
- Manasi Sinha as Bharati Mukherjee - Bochon, Khokon, Buri and Tojon's mother
- Manishankar Banerjee as Animesh Mukherjee - Bochon, Khokon, Buri and Tojon's father
- Ratna Ghoshal / Mita Chatterjee as Animesh's paternal aunt a.k.a. Pishithamma
- Basanti Chatterjee as Hema Malini - Bochon, Khokon, Buri and Tojon's paternal grandmother
- Rani Mukherjee as Banasali Mukherjee a.k.a. Mahua - Animesh and Bharati's eldest daughter-in-law
- Oindrila Saha as Kaushiki Mukherjee a.k.a. Phuljhuri - Bochon and Mahua's daughter
- Tanish Chakraborty as Topor - Abhaya and Khokon's son
- Sandip Chakraborty as Bochon Mukherjee - Animesh and Bharati's eldest son
- Sampurna Mondal / Saheli Ghosh Ray as Ishani Mukherjee a.k.a. Gungun - Abhaya and Khokon's daughter
- Debomoy Mukherjee as Swagato Mukherjee a.k.a. Tojon - Animesh and Bharati's youngest son
- Bhaswar Chatterjee as Baba Biswalok (later disguised as Priyajit Sarkar, a magician, only to seek revenge from Abhaya)
- Annwesha Hazra as Amrita
- Bhaskar Banerjee as Bhaskar Ganguly
- Priyanka Bhattacharjee as Shruti, Buri's student
- Chandrayee Ghosh as Radharani - A corrupt self-proclaimed godwoman (Deceased)
- Mayna Banerjee as Sarada - Abhaya's biological mother (Deceased)
- Rii Sen as Damayanti Bose - Film actress (Deceased)
- Tramila Bhattacharya as Mithila, a police officer
- Joyjit Banerjee as a fellow Inspector
- Priyanka Halder as Rikhiya, Amaresh's girlfriend
- Diya Chakraborty as Upanita and Upasana (double role)
- Manali Dey as Manjari
- Sarmistha Acharjee as Pooja
- Tanuka Chatterjee as Basundhara (Deceased)
- Debachandrima Singha Roy as Ira
- Tumpa Ghosh as Tanushree
- Nabonita Dey as Riyaa.
- Adrija Roy as Diya Singha - Barnali and Durjoy's daughter (Deceased)
- Sohini Sanyal as Barnali Singha - Diya's mother, Durjoy's wife
- Joy Badlani as Durjoy Singha - Diya's father, Barnali's husband
- Nandini Chatterjee as Nivedita Palit - Pooja's mother in-law
- Moushumi Priya Debnath as Pia
- Sayanta Modak as Korok, Pia's husband
- Sreetama Bhattacharya as Sudipa
- Geetashree Roy as Rikia
- Payel Dey as Ritoja
- Pratyusha Paul as Ranja
- Sonali Chowdhury as Chandni
- Aindrila Sharma as Poulomi
- Aishwarya Sen as Paromita
- Samrat Mukherji as Animesh
- Alivia Sarkar as Linda
- Rajesh kr Chattopadhyay as Ajay
- Trina Saha as Keya
- Ushasi Ray as Muniya
- Swarnava Sanyal as Baban
- Kanyakumari Mukherjee as Baban's mother
- Jasmine Roy as Swati - Sandip's wife and Goutam's love interest
- Farhan Imroze as Sandip - Swati's husband /Fake Sandip or Goutam, Rini's husband and Swati's love interest
- Aemila Sadhukan as Rini, Goutam's wife
- Soumitrisha Kundu as Raka
- Animesh Bhaduri as Sukumar- Sarbani's love interest.
- Shovan Kamila as Hari
- Rita Dutta Chakraborty as Amrita's Mother-in-law; But She knows Kamala's mother-in-law
