= Sourav Chakraborty (actor) =

Indian actor (born 1988)

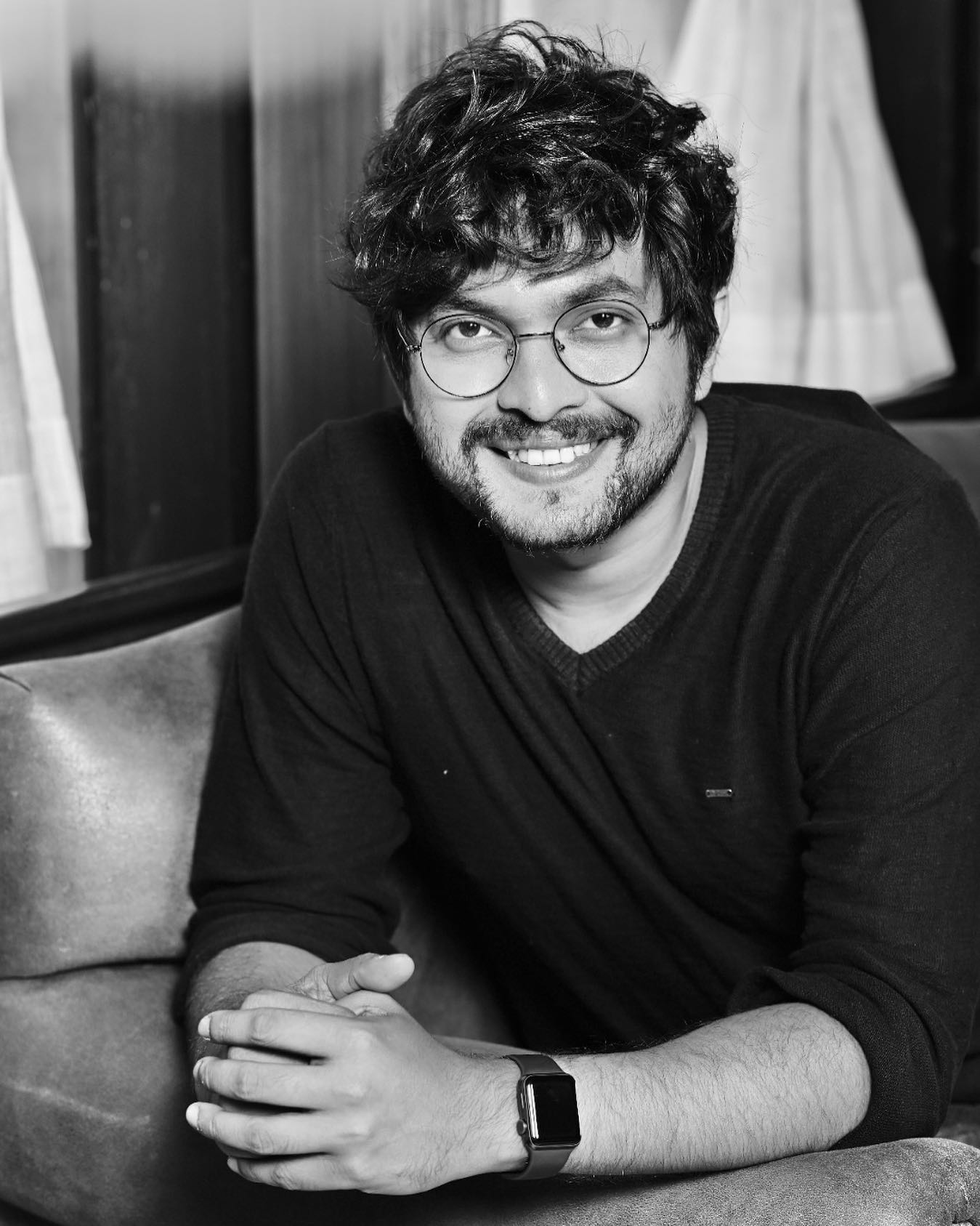
- Born: 11 October 1988 (age 38); West Bengal, India
- Occupations: Actor, Director, Producer

Sourav Chakraborty (Bengali: সৌরভ চক্রবর্তী; born 11 October 1988) is an Indian actor, director, writer and producer. He has started his career with the Bengali television series Bodhu Kon Alo Laaglo Chokhe, as the character Sourav Mitra. He made his directorial debut in the Bengali web series Cartoon. His other works include: Japani Toy, Murder in The Hills, Paanch Phoron, Jotugriha, Dhanbad Blues, Lift, Rajneeti. His web series Shobdo Jobdo received Brand Equity SPOTT Awards for Best Regional Web Series.

== Filmography ==
=== Television ===
Year	Name	Character	Channel	Role(S)	Language (S)
2011	Sabinoy Nibedan	Joydeep	Sananda TV	Lead Role	Bengali
2012 – 2014	Bodhu Kon Alo Laaglo Chokhe	Sourav Maitra	Star Jalsha	Lead Role	Bengali
2015 – 2016	Aaj Aari Kaal Bhaab	Ishaan Ganguly	Star Jalsha	Lead Role	Bengali
2016 – 2017	Mem Bou	Koustov Lahiri aka Gora	Star Jalsha	Lead Role	Bengali
2025 – Present	Lokkhi Jhnapi	Diptarko "Deep" Sarkar aka Babban / Utshav Roy Chowdhury	Star Jalsha	Lead Role	Bengali

=== Web Series ===
Year	Name	Platform
2021	Murder in the Hills	Hoichoi
2019	Charitraheen	Hoichoi
2019	Paanch Phoron	Hoichoi
2023	Shwetkali	ZEE5
2023	Farzi	Prime Video
2022	Hello3	Hoichoi

=== Movies ===
Year	Name
2019	Bhobishyoter Bhoot
2017	Amar Sahor
Not Released	Epar Opar
2015	Ekti Bangali Bhooter Goppo
2015	Jhoomura
2021	Burning Butterflies

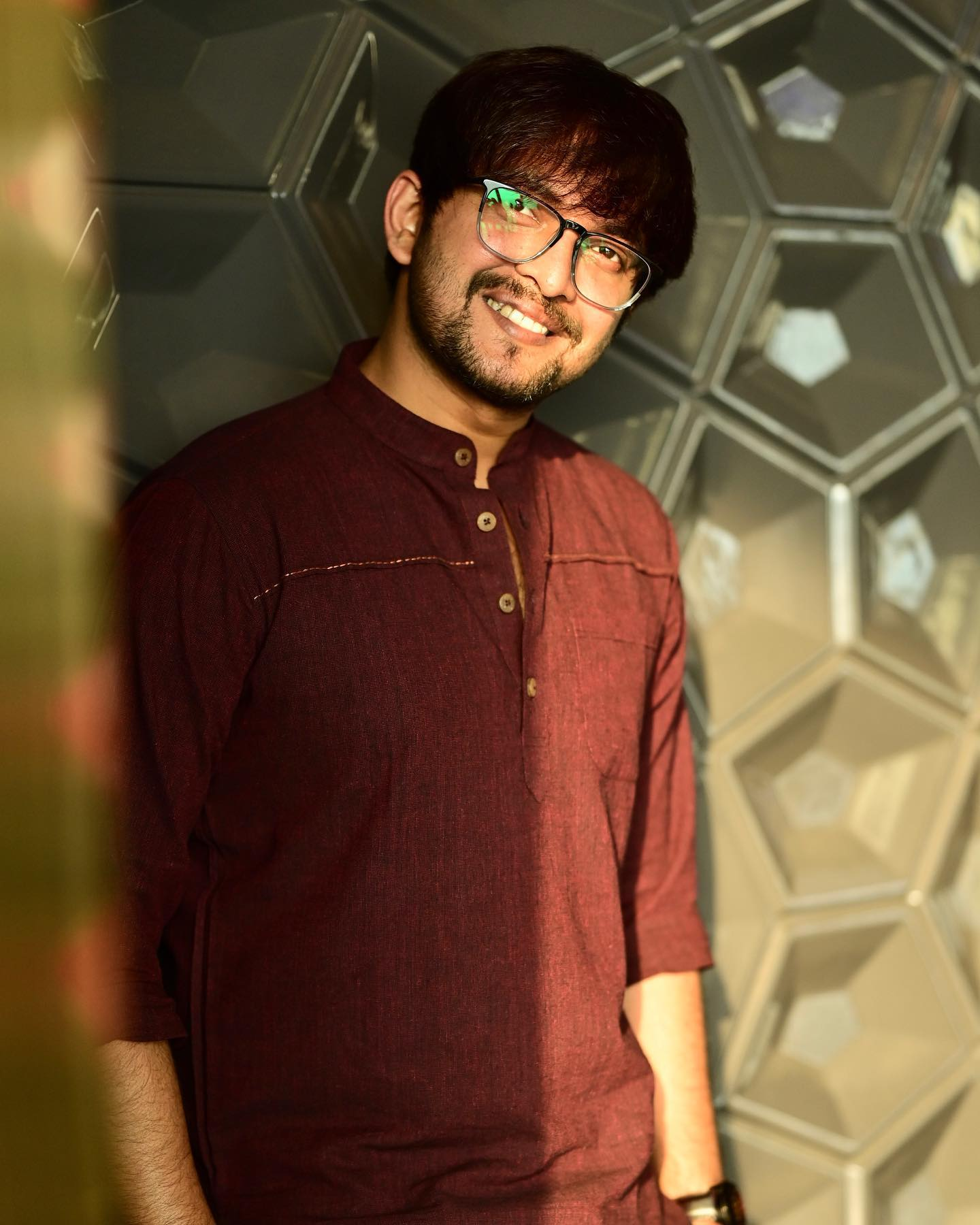
Sourav Chakraborty

=== Direction ===
Year	Work
2024	Abar Rajneeti
2024	Chemistry Mashi
Upcoming	Saare Saitrish
2023	Rajneeti
2020	Shobdo Jobdo
2019	Calm Sutra
2018	Dhanbad Blues
2018	Japani Toy
2017	Lift
2017	Cartoon
2014	Batik O Biggapon
