= Jeetu Kamal =

Bengali actor

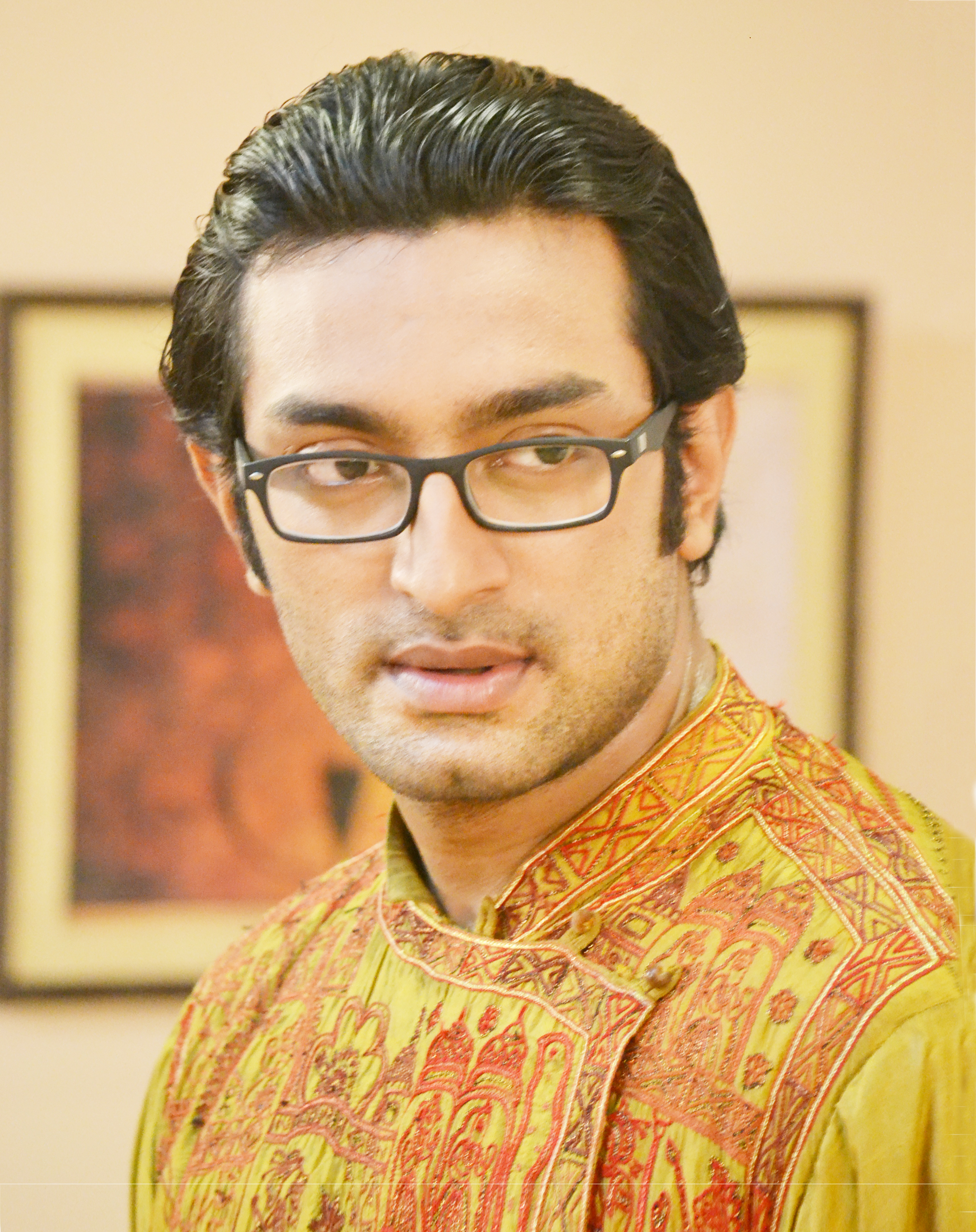
- Born: Kamal Paul; 28 August 1990 (age 36); Kolkata, West Bengal, India
- Occupations: Actor, model
- Spouse: Nabanita Das (m. 2019; div. 2023)

Kamal Paul, with the screen name Jeetu Kamal, is an Indian television and film actor known for his role as Aparajito Ray, a character based on Satyajit Ray in the 2022 film Aparajito.

== Filmography ==
Year	Film	Role	Director	Co-Artist	Notes
2010	Jor Jar Muluk Tar	Inspector	Haranath Chakraborty	Prosenjit Chatterjee	
2013	Sweetheart	Rockstar	Pradip Sarkar	Paoli Dam	
2018	Adventures of Jojo	Sujoy Bose (Forest inspector)	Raj Chakraborty	Manali Dey, Jashojeet Banerjee	
2019	Lime n Light	Ayanjit (Film Star)	Reshmi Mitra	Rituparna Sengupta, Arjun Chakraborty	
2019	Erao Satru	Rana (Inspector)	Sandip Chowdhury	Rajesh Sharma, Joy	
2020	Bidrohini	Rahul (Lawyer)	Sandip Chowdhury	Rituparna Sengupta	
2022	Aparajito	Aparajito Roy (Film Director, based on Satyajit Ray)	Anik Dutta	Saayoni Ghosh	
2023	Manush: Child of Destiny	Mannan	Sanjay Samaddar	Jeet	
2024	Aranyar Prachin Probad	Detective Aranya	Dulal Dey	Silajit Majumder	
2024	Sedin Kuyasha Chilo		Arnab K Middya	Paran Bandopadhyay	
2024	Padatik	Satyajit Ray	Srijit Mukherji	Chanchal Chowdhury	
2025	Babusona	Babu	Anshuman Pratyush	Srabanti Chatterjee	14 feb 2025 Release
2025	Grihapravesh	Megh	Indradip Dasgupta	Subhashree Ganguly	
	Ami Amar Moto	TBA	Kamaleshwar Mukherjee	Srabanti Chatterjee	19 December 2025 release
2026	Aponjon	TBA	Anshuman Pratyush	Payel Sarkar	December 2026 release
2027	Maharaja Tomare Selam	Satyajit Ray	Srijit Mukherji	Ritwik Bhowmik, Rudranil Ghosh	

== Television ==
Year	Serial	Character	Channel
2010	Niyoti	Ranbir Laheri	ETV Bangla
2011	Bhola Maheswar	Bhola Maheswar	Sananda TV
2013-2015	Raage Anuraage	Mollar Sen	Zee Bangla
2015-2017	Milon Tithi	Arjun Mullick	Star Jalsha
2017-2018	Rangiye Diye Jao	Bablu Ghosh	Zee Bangla
2018	Ardhangini	Aayush Ghoshal	Star Jalsha
2019-2022	Mahapeeth Tarapith	Ananda Nath	Star Jalsha
2019-2020	Guriya Jekhane Guddu Sekhane	Sukumar	Star Jalsha
2021-2022	Hoyto Tomari Janyo	Aditya Narayan Lahiri	Aakash Aath
2025–Present	Chirodini Tumi Je Amar	Arya Singha Roy / Shankar	Zee Bangla
2026	Bigg Boss Bangla 3	Contestant	Star Jalsha

== Awards and nominations ==
Year	Award	Category	Film/TV show	Result
2014	Tele Somman	Best Actor	Raage Anuraage	Won
2014	Tele Somman	Priyo Juti	Raage Anuraage	Won
2015	Zee Bangla Sonar Songsar Awards	Priyo Baba	Raage Anuraage	Won
2015	Zee Bangla Sonar Songsar Awards	Priyo Bor	Raage Anuraage	Won
2015	Zee Bangla Sonar Songsar Awards	Priyo Juti (with Tumpa Ghosh )	Raage Anuraage	Won
2015	Telly Academy Awards	Best on-screen couple (with Tumpa Ghosh )	Raage Anuraage	Won
2016	Star Jalsha Parivaar Awards	Notun Sodosyo	Milon Tithi	Won
2017	Star Jalsha Parivaar Awards	Priyo Bor	Milon Tithi	Won
2022	West Bengal Film Journalists' Association Awards	Most Promising Actor	Aparajito (2022 film)	Won
