= Tobu Mone Rekho =

2017 Indian television series

- Genre: Drama
- Written by: Sahana
- Screenplay by: Malova; Sudip
- Story by: Sahana
- Directed by: Srijit Roy
- Creative director: Sahana
- Starring: Pratyusha Paul; Farhan Imroze; Payel Dey
- Theme music composer: Upali Chattopadhyay
- Country of origin: India
- Original language: Bengali
- No. of episodes: 139

Production
- Executive producers: Somjita Chatterjee; Aniruddha Ghosh
- Producers: Shrikant Mohta; Mahendra Soni
- Camera setup: Multi-camera
- Production company: Shree Venkatesh Films

Original release
- Network: Zee Bangla
- Release: 6 March – 23 July 2017

Tobu Mone Rekho is a 2017 Indian Bengali drama television series released on 6 March 2017 on Zee Bangla. The series is produced under the banner of Shree Venkatesh Films. It stars Pratyusha Paul, Farhan Imroze and Payel Dey in lead roles.

== Cast ==
=== Main ===
- Pratyusha Paul as Rai
- Farhan Imrose as Rajat
- Payel Dey as Supriya

=== Recurring ===
- Manasi Sinha as Mandhakini
- Ananya Sen as Fuluri
- Samriddho as Bitkel
- Pushpita Mukherjee / Ranjini Chattopadhyay as Sunanda; Rajat's mother
- Bhaskar Banerjee as Rajat's father
- Sohini Sanyal as Dolon
- Debomoy Mukherjee as Omu
- Mafin Chakraborty as Durba
- Pallavi Dey as Piya
- Ashmita Mukherjee as Kheya
- Tanuka Chatterjee as Supriya's mother
- Anindita Raychaudhury as Jinia
- Sourav Das as Nilu
