= Mukhosh (2021 film) =

2021 film by Birsa Dasgupta

- Directed by: Birsa Dasgupta
- Written by: Midhun Manuel Thomas
- Produced by: Mahendra Soni
- Starring: Anirban Bhattacharya; Kaushik Sen
- Cinematography: Subhankar Bhar
- Production company: Shree Venkatesh Films
- Distributed by: Shree Venkatesh Films
- Release date: 19 August 2021
- Country: India
- Language: Bengali

Mukhosh (transl. The Mask) is a 2021 Indian Bengali-language psychological thriller film directed by Birsa Dasgupta starring Anirban Bhattacharya. The film, an official remake of the Malayalam movie Anjaam Pathiraa, was released theatrically on 19 August 2021. The movie was released by the name Mukhosh instead of Psycho.

== Synopsis ==
A series of gruesome murders jolt Kolkata. The latest victims are from the Kolkata police - they are kidnapped, slowly tortured, killed, and their hearts taken out. The police invite Kinshuk, a criminologist, to analyze and present insights into the case.

== Cast ==
- Anirban Bhattacharya as Kingshuk Roy
- Chandrayee Ghosh as Kaberi Bose
- Payel De as Rai Roy
- Tota Roy Chowdhury as Dr. David S. Paul
- Anirban Chakraborty as Adrish Burman
- Soumya Sengupta
- Shahir Raj as David Paul
- Kaushik Sen as Kalyan Roy Chowdhury
- Sohini Sarkar as Souzie Paul
- Prantik Choudhury
- Nilanjan Ghosal as hacker

== Production ==
Dasgupta started shooting the film in February 2021. Anirban Bhattacharya was announced as a lead cast.

== Title interpretation ==
Talking about the title of the film, the director said, "The word ‘psycho’ is often loosely used, it's a slang to demean someone. We can rarely separate between the psychopath, the sociopath, the troubled and the abused-aggressor. Deranged villains who prey on the weak and innocent, forcing them into unthinkable acts and stealing from them that which they hold most dear are probably the real psychos. And also those who protect them are equally guilty. For the guardians of the devil are demons too. Hoping to deal with such a relevant social discourse through a film is exciting indeed."
