= Bodhu Kon Alo Laaglo Chokhe =

Indian Bengali television series

- Genre: Drama; Comedy; Romance; Family
- Created by: Shree Venkatesh Films
- Story by: Shrabasti Basu; Dialogues; Saswati Ghosh
- Directed by: Joy Mukherjee; Joydeep Mukherjee
- Starring: Payel Dey; Sourav Chakraborty; Koushik Roy; Chandrayee Ghosh; Saayoni Ghosh
- Voices of: Title track by Madhuraa
- Composer: Raja Narayan Deb
- Country of origin: India
- Original language: Bengali
- No. of episodes: 772

Production
- Producers: Shrikant Mohta; Mahendra Soni
- Production location: Kolkata
- Camera setup: Multi-camera
- Running time: 22 minutes
- Production company: Shree Venkatesh Films

Original release
- Network: Star Jalsha
- Release: 16 January 2012 – 28 June 2014

Bodhu Kon Alo Laaglo Chokhe (Bengali: বধূ কোন আলো লাগলো চোখে) is a Bengali television serial which used to air on GEC Star Jalsha. It was produced by Shree Venkatesh Films and starred Payel Dey and Sourav Chakraborty in the lead roles. After running for successful two and half years, it got replaced by Tumi Asbe Bole.

== Plot ==
The serial takes its name from a song from the dance drama Chitrangada, by Tagore. This is a story of a beautiful girl name Aalo and the various ups and downs she goes throughout her life. A failed marriage caused Aalo to attempt suicide but the twist of fate brought Sourav to her. Aalo accepts to nurture Sourav's daughter Icche, who suffers from an incurable disease. Though Aalo and Sourav care for each other they never represented themselves as ideal married couple as both of them are traumatized with their past experience of marriage.

== Cast ==
- Payel De as Aalo Maitra aka Aalo Lahiri aka Aalo Sarkhel
- Sourav Chakraborty as Sourav Maitra
- Chandrayee Ghosh as Debjani Maitra / Debi
- Koushik Roy as Sougata Maitra
- Sagnik Chatterjee as Sourish Maitra
- Sohini Sanyal as Indrani / Indu
- Elfina Mukherjee as Chandrani / Chhutki
- Manoj Ojha as DK
- Ananya Chatterjee as Debi's Mother
- Ashmita Mukherjee as Sharmi
- Tapan Ganguly as Surendranath Moitra
- Sushmita Dey as Malobika Dutta / Mishtu
- Antara as Bonolata aka Lata
- Ratna Ghoshal as Pishima
- Ripom Majumdar as Shobuj / Debarshi
- Saayoni Ghosh as Ujjaini Sen / Rini
- Kaushik Chakraborty as Late Adinath Siddhanth
- Arindam Chatterjee as Angshuman Lahiri
- Arpita Mukherjee as Mallika
- Debdut Ghosh as SK
- Swagata Mukherjee as Surekha
- Rajat Ganguly as Mamadadu
- Bodhisatva Majumdar as Late Samarendranath Lahiri / Shomu
- Shakuntala Barua as Nonibala
- Ratri Ghatak as Angshuman's younger sister in law
- Koushani Roy as Rupa
- Kaushik Bhattacharya as Rupa's Husband
- Saugata Bandyopadhyay as Angshuman's Boss
- Manasi Sinha as Aalo' s Mother
- Debesh Chattopadhyay as Aalo' s Father
- Subhajit Bakshi as Aalo's Brother
- Ekavali Khanna as Rinky
- Joyjit Banerjee as Shambhu
- Animesh Bhaduri as Indu's Husband
- Indrani Basu as Ujjaini's Mother.
- Moumi Bose as Ichche Maitra
- Prity Biswas as Suhaani Sharma
- Basanti Chatterjee as Mishtu's Grandmother
