= Bidrohini =

2020 Indian Bengali film

Bidhrohini
- Film poster
- Directed by: Sandip Chowdhury
- Produced by: Sandip Chowdhury & Gautam Mukherjee
- Starring: Rituparna Sengupta Bidisha Chowdhury Jeetu Kamal
- Distributed by: Mirage Movies
- Release date: 14 February 2020
- Country: India
- Language: Bengali

Bidhrohini is a 2020 Indian Bengali-language action drama film directed and produced by Sandip Chowdhury. This film was released on 14 February 2020 under the banner of Mirage movies. This is the debut direction of Sandip Choodhury, son of director Anjan Choudhury.

== Plot ==
Arunima, the daughter of Pranab and Radha of a middle-class family, live happily. One day Arunima was raped. Her elder sister Kiran is an IPS officer who fights alone for justice. She faced a serious problem when she came to know that her husband's family was involved in the crime.

== Cast ==
- Rituparna Sengupta as Kiran
- Jeetu Kamal as Rahul
- Bidisha Chowdhury
- Sonali Chowdhury
- Phalguni Mukherjee
- Anindo Sarkar
- Santana Basu
- Arunima Sen
- Soma Chakraborty
- Parthasarathi Deb
