= Shwetkali =

Indian Bengali-language web-series

- Promotional poster for Shwetkali
- Genre: Thriller
- Created by: Sani Ghose Ray
- Written by: Sani Ghose Ray
- Directed by: Sani Ghose Ray
- Starring: Oindrila Sen; Saheb Bhattacharya; Sourav Chakraborty
- Music by: Pralay Saha
- Country of origin: India
- Original language: Bengali
- No. of seasons: 2
- No. of episodes: 15

Production
- Producers: Snigdha Basu; Sani Ghosh Ray
- Editor: Subhadeep Das
- Production company: Acropoliis Entertainment

Original release
- Network: ZEE5
- Release: 24 February 2023

Shwetkali is a 2023 Bengali psychological mystery thriller web series. Created and directed by Sani Ghosh Ray, the series marks the OTT debut of Oindrilla Sen. Sourav Chakraborty, Saheb Bhattacharya, Arindam Ganguly, Debdut Ghosh, Devlina Kumar, Samadarshi Dutta, Swagata Basu and Rishi Koushik play other pivotal roles. Produced by Acropoliis Entertainment, the series was streamed on ZEE5 on 24 February 2023 to positive reviews from the audience and critics alike. The series got renewed for a second season, which premiered on October 23, 2026. Oindrilla Sen was retained as protagonist.

== Premise ==
Shwetkali follows the story of Urbi and Palash and their families after they reach the Kharapani Mansion to celebrate their engagement. In the middle of the celebrations, a wall in the mansion breaks down, revealing a hidden statue of white Kali, also referred to as Shwet Kali. Following this, a number of incidents unravel that hark back to a dark past and how they have an implication on the present.

== Cast ==
- Oindrilla Sen as Urbi
- Sourav Chakraborty as Arunabha
- Saheb Bhattacharya as Palash
- Arindam Ganguly as Mahitosh
- Debdut Ghosh as Priyotosh
- Devlina Kumar as Annie
- Samadarshi Dutta as Shimul
- Swagata Basu as Shikha
- Rishi Kaushik as Narendra Pratap
- Ratan Sarkhel as Balaram Purohit
- Ranit Modok as Bablu
- Saswati Mazumdar as Tanima
- Prantik Banerjee as Debnath
- Mantra Bose as Nayantara
- Lokinath Dey as Police Officer
- Mallika Sinha Roy as Madhumita
- Koushiki as Avayananda
- Sunny as Bonnie
- Rana Basu Thakur as Supriyo
- Chiradip Mitra as Manager
- Biswanath Das as Gangacharan
- Debashri Roy as Kanan
- Anwesha as Pushpa
- Tony Bose as Kashi
- Tirtha Chatterjee as Jharna
- Santanu Ghosh as Constable Das
- Subrata Barik as Dr. Gora
- Pritam Chanda as Nathu
- Surangana Bandyopadhyay
- Riddhima Ghosh
- Anindya Chatterjee

== Production ==
=== Announcement ===
The show was announced as a part its future slate of Bengali shows by ZEE5 on 12 December 2022.

=== Marketing and release ===
The trailer of Shwetkali was released on 12 February 2023. The series was streamed on Zee5 on 23 February 2023.

== Episodes ==
=== Series overview ===
| Series | Episodes | Originally released | Network |
|---|---|---|---|
| 1 | 8 | 24 February 2023 | Zee 5 |
| 2 | 7 | 23 October 2026 | Zee 5 |

=== Season 1 ===
| No. | Title | Directed by | Written by | Original release date |
|---|---|---|---|---|
| 1 | "Is The Rajbari Haunted?" | Sani Ghose Ray | Sani Ghose Ray | 24 February 2023 |
| 2 | "The Curse of Kali" | Sani Ghose Ray | Sani Ghose Ray | 24 February 2023 |
| 3 | "Who Killed Gogol?" | Sani Ghose Ray | Sani Ghose Ray | 24 February 2023 |
| 4 | "The Mysterious Shadow" | Sani Ghose Ray | Sani Ghose Ray | 24 February 2023 |
| 5 | "The Bloodthirsty Shwetkali" | Sani Ghose Ray | Sani Ghose Ray | 24 February 2023 |
| 6 | "The Diary of Narendrapratap" | Sani Ghose Ray | Sani Ghose Ray | 24 February 2023 |
| 7 | "The Impotent Zamindar" | Sani Ghose Ray | Sani Ghose Ray | 24 February 2023 |
| 8 | "Case Closed?" | Sani Ghose Ray | Sani Ghose Ray | 24 February 2023 |

=== Season 2 ===
| No. | Title | Directed by | Written by | Original release date |
|---|---|---|---|---|
| 1 | "Guha Kali Awakens" | Sani Ghose Ray | Sani Ghose Ray | 23 October 2026 |
| 2 | "Ahana’s Fatal Fate" | Sani Ghose Ray | Sani Ghose Ray | 23 October 2026 |
| 3 | "Secrets Beneath the Curse" | Sani Ghose Ray | Sani Ghose Ray | 23 October 2026 |
| 4 | "The Curse Claims Two More Lives" | Sani Ghose Ray | Sani Ghose Ray | 23 October 2026 |
| 5 | "Tara Turns the Tables" | Sani Ghose Ray | Sani Ghose Ray | 23 October 2026 |
| 6 | "A Crime Buried for Generations" | Sani Ghose Ray | Sani Ghose Ray | 23 October 2026 |
| 7 | "Deadly Conspiracy Exposed" | Sani Ghose Ray | Sani Ghose Ray | 23 October 2026 |

== Reception ==
=== Critical reception ===
Shamayita Chakraborty of OTTplay rated the film 3.5/5 stars and opined "Shwetkali is a chilling thriller and is made with care. The maker takes great care in building the suspense. Another positive side of the show is its smart dialogue. They are precise and to the point. It doesn’t go over the top." She praised the acting of most of the cast as well as the introductory scenes of the murders but bemoaned the unclarity at certain points, the dialogue heavy climax and some repetitions during the scenes of ancient times.

== Sequel ==
In 2023, ZEE5 announced that a sequel to "Shwetkali" will be made and streamed. Primary conversations were underway as of 2023.
