= Dil Se Diya Vachan =

Indian television series

- Also known as: A Promise Made Straight From The Heart
- Genre: Drama
- Created by: Film Farm India
- Directed by: Ajay Veermal; Niraj Gupta
- Starring: See below
- Opening theme: "Dil Se Diya" by Mahalaxmi Iyer
- Country of origin: India
- Original language: Hindi
- No. of seasons: 1
- No. of episodes: 116

Production
- Producers: Kalyan Guha; Harsh Dave; Pintoo Guha
- Cinematography: Dannie
- Camera setup: Multi-camera
- Running time: Approx. 24 minutes
- Production company: Film Farm India

Original release
- Network: Zee TV
- Release: 25 October 2010 – 1 April 2011

Related
- Idhayam

Dil Se Diya Vachan is an Indian television series based on the story that showcases a powerful true life story about the deep love, trust, bonding and attachment between a mother-in-law and a daughter-in-law. It is a remake of the Tamil serial Idhayam which aired on Sun TV. The series premiered on Zee TV on 25 October 2010 at 7pm, and stars Neena Gupta in the mother-in-law's role and Vandana Joshi in the daughter-in-law's role.

The serial was a hit among the audience, but the creative team decided to pull the show off-air as the main backbone of the show, Neena Gupta could not continue with the serial for medical reasons.

== Plot ==
Nandini is a shy girl whose only living relative is her sister Pallavi Karmarkar. Nandini lives with Pallavi in her marital home with Pallavi's husband Govind and his family - his mother Jayshree, and his sister Sumati. Sumati and Nandini are close friends but Jayshree considers Nandini a burden on the family and resents her.

A marriage proposal for Sumati arrives from the Rajadhyaksha family. Prem Rajadhyaksha is the youngest son of Dr. Kalyani and comes to meet Sumati but on the way he bumps into Nandini and instantly falls in love with her. When he sees her again at the Karmarkars' home, he makes it clear that he wants to marry her. Eventually, everyone agrees and wedding preparations begin. On the day of their engagement, Nandini and Prem get arrested due to a misunderstanding and are bailed out by Govind's younger brother Krushna.

On their wedding day, Govind intercepts a letter meant for the Rajadhyaksha's saying that Nandini has a past and Prem should not marry her. The day after the wedding, Kalyani opens her front door to see someone has left a baby with a letter stating that the baby is Nandini's. Kalyani tries to keep the secret from everyone but when her mother-in-law and other daughter-in-law Urmila find out, Nandini agrees to undergo medical tests to prove the baby is not hers. The truth is confirmed but Kalyani discovers something else and discusses it with Govind and Pallavi. They reveal that Nandini was raped at a family wedding and delivered a stillborn child but since she was in a coma after the incident, she has no memory of it. Kalyani decides to keep the truth to herself.

On her birthday, Nandini overhears Pallavi and Gautam discussing the incident and feels disgusted and betrayed, but she also feels that she has betrayed Prem. Kalyani makes Nandini promise her that she will keep this truth from Prem and the entire family and that she will maintain a distance from Prem. Prem's sister Prapti is getting engaged to Mayank and on the day of the ceremony, a series of events lead Nandini to recall the incident and that her rapist was Krushna. Krushna claims he loves her and brutally misbehaves with her, and continues to harass Nandini for many days warning her that her only option is to surrender herself to him or he will harm Prem. He creates misunderstandings between Nandini and Prem. Nandini decides to tell Prem the truth and confess her love for him by recording a message but Prem listens to half the message and rushes to Nandini. They embrace and consummate their marriage.

When Prem hears the full message, he is shocked and blames Nandini for betraying. Kalyani defends Nandini and reminds everyone that it wasn't Nandini's fault that she was raped. The following day Prem realises that he was wrong but his father refuses to accept Nandini and forces her and Prem to leave the house. Prem struggles to find a job to support Nandini and himself, but finally accepts a job offer from Krushna, unaware of Krushna's truth.

Tired of Krushna's threats, Nandini makes him confess while Prem and Sonakshi, Krushna's wife, overhear the entire the conversation. Prem gets into a fight with Krushna and a blast occurs in which Krushna dies. Prem is arrested for Krushna's death. Nandini and Gautam struggle to find a lawyer to fight Prem's case and eventually Sumati steps in to fight the case against Sonakshi's lawyer who happens to be Sumati's law professor. Sumati and Nandini try to collect evidence to strengthen their case against Krushna, however all of their efforts are ruined because Jayshree sabotages their case wanting justice for Krushna.

Jayshree finds out that Krushna is alive and is now in hiding. Nandini is finally compelled to tell the court that Krushna raped her and made her life miserable. Nandini finds the doctor that treated her when she was raped but the doctor is bribed by Krushna and turns hostile in court. Kalyani is contacted by an anonymous caller saying that he has the evidence of Krushna being alive, so she and Nandini go to collect the evidence. Krushna finds out and tries to snatch the evidence from Kalyani. A struggle ensues and Kalyani falls to her death.

During the next court hearing, Govind stands in the witness box and claims that he was the one who raped Nandini and killed Krushna out of anger hoping that this will awaken Krushna's sleeping humanity. Krushna cannot endure the guilt and finally cracks. He surrenders himself admitting to all his crimes. Jayshree apologises to Nandini and gives her her blessings as does Prem's father.

Nandini returns to her in laws and the family becomes busy in preparing for Prapti's wedding. Prem is contacted by a ward boy who tells him that Nandini's child is in fact alive and living at an orphanage after he had switched the babies. They track down the girl called Mithoo at the orphanage. Nandini is unable to accept Mithoo because she is constantly reminded of the incident and that Mithoo is a part of Krushna. Prem wants to accept Mithoo and regards her as his daughter. Nandini finally accepts Mithoo and they all live happily ever after.

== Cast ==
- Vandana Joshi as Nandini Prem Rajadhyaksha
- Gaurav Khanna as Prem Rajadhyaksha
- Neena Gupta as Dr. Kalyani Gautam Rajadhyaksha, Prem's mother
- Ravindra Mankani as Gautam Rajadhyaksha, Prem's father
- Ajay Chaudhary as Krushna Karmarkar, Govind's younger brother
- Ayub Khan as Govind Karmarkar, Pallavi's husband
- Sai Ranade Sane as Pallavi Govind Karmarkar, Nandini's elder sister
- Abigail Jain as Advocate Sumati Karmarkar, Govind's younger sister
- Jayshree T. as Jayshree Karmarkar, Govind, Krushna and Sumati's mother
- Suhasini Mulay / Bharati Achrekar as Mrs. Rajadhyaksha (Dadi), Prem's paternal grandmother
- Mihir Mishra as Pratham Rajadhyaksha, Prem's elder brother
- Ashlesha Sawant as Urmila Pratham Rajadhyaksha, Pratham's wife
- Neha Narang as Prapti Rajadhyaksha, Prem's sister
- Manish Naggdev as Mayank, Prapti's husband
- Suchita Trivedi as Sonakshi Krushna Karmakar, Krushna's wife and Mayank's elder sister
- Rajeev Verma as Sonakshi and Mayank's father
