= Meri Saas Bhoot Hai =

Indian drama television series

- Genre: Drama; Comedy; Horror
- Starring: Sushmita Mukherjee; Kajal Chauhan; Vibhav Roy
- Country of origin: India
- Original language: Hindi
- No. of episodes: 128

Production
- Producers: Pintoo Guha; Rupali Guha
- Running time: 20-24 minutes
- Production company: Film Farm India

Original release
- Network: Star Bharat
- Release: 23 January – 7 July 2023

Related
- Chuni Panna

Meri Saas Bhoot Hai is an Indian Hindi-language horror-comedy television series. It was produced by Film Farm India and it is an official remake of Star Jalsha's Bengali series Chuni Panna. It starred Sushmita Mukherjee, Kajal Chauhan and Vibhav Roy as main leads. It aired from 23 January 2023 to 7 July 2023 on Star Bharat.

== Cast ==
- Sushmita Mukherjee as Rekha
- Kajal Chauhan as Gaura
- Vibhav Roy as Som: Rekha's son; Gaura's ex–husband; Twinkle's husband

=== Recurring ===
- Kundan Kumar as Panditji
- Bhavana Balsavar as Kanchan Jiji, Rekha's sister-in-law and Som's Bua
- Vishal Chaudhary as Rahul, Jiji's son.
- Tarun Datta as Chandu Dubey (Som's Friend)
- Anant Kumar as Satish Sharma
- Anushka Srivastava as Twinkle: Som's second wife
- Zaan Khan as Varun: Gaura's fiancee

== Production ==
Sushmita Mukherjee was cast in the titular role, of Ghost as Rekha. Kajal Chauhan was cast as Gaura opposite Mukherjee.

Initially, Namik Paul was in talks to play male lead but could not join due to his prior commitments. Vibhav Roy was cast opposite Chauhan. Anushka Srivastava was cast to portray the negative lead.

The series is set against the backdrop of Varanasi. It is mainly shot at the Film City, Mumbai. It replaced RadhaKrishn from 23 January 2023 at the 7:30 PM slot. From 15 June 2023, its timeslot shifted to 9 PM replacing Woh Toh Hai Albelaa.

== Adaptations ==
Language	Title	Original release	Networks(s)	Last aired	Notes
Bengali	Chuni Panna চুনি পান্না	11 November 2019	Star Jalsha	11 October 2020	Original
Hindi	Meri Saas Bhoot Hai मेरी सास भूत है	23 January 2023	Star Bharat	7 July 2023	Remake

== See also ==
- List of programs broadcast by Star Bharat
- List of Hindi comedy shows
