= Behula (TV series) =

Bengali mythological television serial

- Promotional poster
- Genre: Mythology
- Created by: Shree Venkatesh Films
- Story by: Kajari; Dialogues; Anuja Chatterjee
- Directed by: Soumik Chatterjee
- Starring: Payel Dey, Kaushik Chakraborty, Rupanjana Mitra, Chandrayee Ghosh
- Voices of: "Gorol Senche" by Upaali Chatterjee
- Composer: Mayukh Mainak
- Country of origin: India
- Original language: Bengali
- No. of seasons: 1
- No. of episodes: 450

Production
- Producers: Shrikant Mohta; Mahendra Soni
- Production location: Kolkata
- Running time: 20 mins
- Production company: Shree Venkatesh Films

Original release
- Network: Star Jalsha
- Release: March 15, 2010 – August 21, 2011

Behula is a mythological Bengali television serial that was broadcast on GEC Star Jalsha in 2010, on weekdays at 9:30pm. It stars Payel Dey, Arka Majumdar, Rimjhim Mitra, Chandrayee Ghosh, Kaushik Chakraborty and Rupanjana Mitra. Produced by Shree Venkatesh Films, it is based on the story of Behula and Lakhindar. It has been aired on Star Vijay as a dubbed Tamil show, Mangayin Sabatham, and on Sahara One as a dubbed Hindi show under the same name. This serial has also been dubbed in Assamese as Soti Beula and aired on Focus Hifi. It was re-aired on Star Jalsha during lockdown period, due to COVID-19.

== Plot ==
The show was adapted from the Hindu mythological story of Manasamangal Kāvya and Behula.

The story of Manasamangal begins with the conflict between the merchant Chandradhar (or Chand Sadagar) and the goddess Manasa and ends with Chandradhar becoming an ardent devotee of Manasa. Chandradhar is a worshipper of Shiva, but Manasa hopes that she can win over Chand to her worship. But, far from worshipping her, Chand refuses to even recognize her as a deity. Manasa takes revenge on Chand by destroying seven of his ships at sea and killing his seven sons. Finally, Behula, the newly-wed wife of Chand's youngest son Lakhindar, makes the goddess yield to her love for her husband through her strength of character, limitless courage and deep devotion. Behula succeeds in bringing Chand's seven sons back to life and rescuing their ships. Only then does she return home. Manasamangal is the tale of oppressed humanity. Chandradhar and Behula have been portrayed as two strong and determined characters at a time when ordinary human beings were subjugated and humiliated. The epic brings out the caste divisions and the conflicts between Aryans and non-Aryans. The conflict between human beings and the goddess brings out the social discrimination of society, as well as the conflict between Aryans and non-Aryans. Shiva, whom Chand worshipped, was originally not an Aryan god, but over time was elevated to that position. Manasa's victory over Chand suggests the victory of the indigenous or non-Aryan deity over the Aryan god. However, even Manasa is defeated by Behula. The poem thus suggests not only the victory of the non-Aryan deity over the Aryan god, but also the victory of the human spirit over the powerful goddess. Manasamangal is also remarkable for its portrayal of Behula who epitomises the best in Indian womanhood, especially the Bengali woman's devotion to her husband.

== Cast ==
- Payel De as Behula/Usha
- Arkajyoti Paul Chaudhury as Lakhindar/Aniruddha
- Rimjhim Mitra / Chandrayee Ghosh as Manasha
- Kaushik Chakraborty as Chand Sadagar
- Swaswati Guha Thakurata as Chand Sadagar's mother
- Suchismita Chowdhury as Neeti Dhopani
- Rupanjana Mitra as Sanaka
- June Malia as Parvati
- Kushal Chakraborty as Shiva
- Kamalika Banerjee / Locket Chatterjee / Subhadra Mukherjee as Sumitra: Behula's mother
- Soma Dey as Behula's grandmother
- Debdut Ghosh as Saha Bene, Behula's father
- Nayana Banerjee
- Arpita Mukherjee

== Production ==
The show was produced by Shree Venkatesh Films. It was relaunched again in 2013 on Jalsha Movies along with Bou Kotha Kao. The show generated a TRP of 13.0 which was a record for Kolkata television.
