= Gouri Elo =

2022 Indian Bengali television series

- Genre: Drama; Supernatural; Mythology
- Created by: Crazy Ideas Media
- Written by: Dialogues; Souvik Chakraborty
- Screenplay by: Anandarupa
- Story by: Souvik Chakraborty
- Directed by: Swarnendu Samaddar
- Creative directors: Sougata Mukherjee; Swarnendu Samadder
- Starring: Mohona Maiti; Biswarup Bandyopadhyay; Chandrayee Ghosh; Sumanta Mukherjee
- Country of origin: India
- Original language: Bengali
- No. of episodes: 616

Production
- Executive producers: Priyajeet, Sourav & Abhinandan (Crazy Ideas); Sromona Ghosh & Aniruddha Ghosh (Zee Bangla)
- Producers: Swarnendu Samaddar; Rupa Banerjee
- Cinematography: Vivek Ranjan Chatterjee
- Editors: Ayan, Dibakar & Subhadeep
- Camera setup: Multi camera
- Running time: 22 minutes
- Production company: Crazy Ideas Media

Original release
- Network: Zee Bangla
- Release: 28 February 2022 – 24 November 2023

Gouri Elo is an Indian Bengali language television series that was broadcast on Indian Bengali general entertainment channel Zee Bangla. The series is produced by Crazy Ideas Media. It stars Mohona Maiti and Biswarup Bandyopadhyay in lead roles. It premiered on 28 February 2022 and ended on 24 November 2023.

== Plot ==
Dr. Ishan does not believe in God, but Gouri believes in God in her heart. With the arrival of Gouri, the gate of the temple is opened automatically, the veil of Goddess Kali's head is raised at the first sight of Gouri. As per the plot of the story, the doctor believes worship is superstition, to which Gouri replies, "Maybe in the coming days, you will be the one to trust god the most".

== Cast ==
=== Main ===
- Mohona Maiti as Gouri Ghosh Ghoshal – Manoka and Himadri's daughter; Sujata and Nibaron's adopted daughter; Tiya's adopted sister; Ishan's wife; Tara's mother
- Biswarup Bandyopadhyay as Dr. Ishan Ghoshal – Shantanu and Sreemoti's son; Neela's brother; Pola, Mukta, Mainak and Chiku's cousin; Gouri's husband; Tara's father
- Rishita Nandi as Tara Ghoshal – Ishan and Gouri's daughter; Akash's cousin

=== Recurring ===
- Samata Das as Sujata – Nibaron's wife; Tiya's mother; Gouri's adoptive mother; Tara's adoptive grandmother
- Arindol Bagchi as Nibaron – Sujata's husband; Tiya's father; Gouri's adoptive father; Tara's adoptive grandfather
- Sinchana Sarkar as Tiya – Sujata and Nibaron's daughter; Gouri's adopted sister
- Swarnakamal Dutta as Manoka Ghosh – Himadri's widow; Gouri's mother; Tara's grandmother
- Chandrayee Ghosh as Shailaja "Shaila" Ghoshal Tarapder – A corrupt self-proclaimed godwoman; Rasamay and Arundhuti's daughter; Devtanu's sister; Shantanu and Atanu's cousin; Pratik's wife; Mainak's mother
- Mousumi Saha as Arundhati Ghoshal – Rasamay's widow; Shailaja and Devtanu's mother; Mainak and Chiku's grandmother
- Sumanta Mukherjee as Late Rasamay Ghoshal (Main Antagonist) – Shukhamay's brother; Arundhati's husband; Shailaja and Devtanu's father; Mainak and Chiku's grandfather (Dead)
- Bodhisattwa Majumdar as Shukhamay Ghoshal – Rasamay's brother; Shantanu and Atanu's father; Neela, Ishan, Pola and Mukta's grandfather; Akash and Tara's great-grandfather
- Rohit Mukherjee as Shantanu Ghoshal – Shukhamay's son; Atanu's brother; Shailaja and Devtanu's cousin; Sreemoti's husband; Neela and Ishan's father; Tara's grandfather (Dead)
- Anindita Das as Sreemoti Ghoshal – Shantanu's widow; Neela and Ishan's mother; Tara's grandmother
- Bhaswar Chatterjee as Atanu Ghoshal – Shukhamay's son; Shantanu's brother; Shailaja and Devtanu's cousin; Madhuri's husband; Pola and Mukta's father; Akash's grandfather
- Kanyakumari Mukherjee / Sujata Daw as Madhuri Ghoshal – Atanu's wife; Pola and Mukta's mother; Akash's grandmother
- Dwaipayan Das as Devtanu "Debu" Ghoshal – Rasamay and Arundhati's son; Shailaja's brother; Shantanu and Atanu's cousin; Anandi's husband; Chiku's father
- Ankita Majumder as Anandi Ghoshal – Devtanu's wife; Chiku's mother
- Sreetama Roy Chowdhury as Neela Ghoshal Chatterjee – Shantanu and Sreemoti's daughter; Ishan's sister; Pola, Mukta, Mainak and Chiku's cousin; Rupam's wife
- Raj Bhattacharya as Rupam Chatterjee – Neela's husband
- Olivia Malakar as Mukta Ghoshal – Atanu and Madhuri's daughter; Pola's sister; Neela, Ishan, Mainak and Chiku's cousin
- Ankita Biswas as Pola Ghoshal – Atanu and Madhuri's daughter; Mukta's sister; Neela, Ishan, Mainak and Chiku's cousin; Surya's wife; Akash's mother
- Arkajyoti Paul Chaudhury as Surya – Pola's husband; Akash's father
- Arnab Chakraborty as Mainak Tarapder – Pratik and Shailaja's son; Neela, Ishan, Pola, Mukta and Chiku's cousin
- Aarush Dey as Chiku Ghoshal – Anandi and Devtanu's son; Neela, Ishan, Pola, Mukta and Mainak's cousin
- Amitava Das as Dr. Arnab Mitra – Ishan's friend
- Gora Dhar as Sanatan Sapui – Gouri's well wisher
- Ritu Rai Acharya as Rumela – Ishan's lover
- Goutam Halder as Dhurjoti Baba – A corrupt self-proclaimed godman; Shailaja's partner
- Tanushree Bhattacharya Bose as Devi Ghomta Kali
- Pradip Dhar as Zamindar
- Pritha Bandyopadhyay as Zamindar's wife
- Priyam as Hemendra Narayan
- Nandini Dutta as Ganga
- Shuvanan Dutta as Rony – Surya's friend
- Manoj Ojha as Gurudev
- Payel Dutta as Ratna - Black magic practitioner, Shaila's well wisher
- Gopa Nandi as Roshni Bai
- Dipanjan Bhattacharya as Pratik Tarapder - Shaila's husband, Mainak's father

== Reception ==
=== 2022 ===
Week	Year	BARC Viewership		Ref.
Week	Year	TRP	Rank	Ref.
Week 9	2022	7.8	8	
Week 10	2022	7.5	9	
Week 11	2022	7.7	9	
Week 12	2022	8.2	6	
Week 13	2022	7.7	5	
Week 14	2022	8.4	2	
Week 15	2022	7.1	4	
Week 16	2022	7.9	3	
Week 17	2022	7.4	4	
Week 18	2022	7.0	4	
Week 19	2022	7.8	3	
Week 20	2022	7.4	5	
Week 21	2022	7.5	4	
Week 22	2022	7.2	5	
Week 23	2022	7.3	2	
Week 24	2022	7.7	2	
Week 25	2022	7.6	5	
Week 26	2022	7.7	4	
Week 27	2022	7.3	3	
Week 28	2022	7.4	5	
Week 29	2022	7.9	3	
Week 30	2022	7.3	5	
Week 31	2022	7.6	4	
Week 32	2022	8.0	3	
Week 33	2022	7.9	2	
Week 34	2022	8.2	1	
Week 35	2022	8.0	2	
Week 36	2022	7.3	4	
Week 37	2022	7.9	3	
Week 38	2022	7.7	3	
Week 39	2022	8.2	1	
Week 40	2022	7.5	1	
Week 41	2022	7.8	1	
Week 42	2022	7.7	2	
Week 43	2022	6.9	4	
Week 44	2022	6.9	5	
Week 45	2022	6.4	7	
Week 46	2022	6.9	5	
Week 47	2022	6.9	5	
Week 48	2022	7.5	4	
Week 49	2022	7.8	4	
Week 50	2022	8.0	3	
Week 51	2022	8.1	3	
Week 52	2022	8.1	3	

=== 2023 ===
Week	Year	BARC Viewership		Ref.
Week	Year	TRP	Rank	Ref.
Week 1	2023	8.0	4	
Week 2	2023	8.0	3	
Week 3	2023	7.8	3	
Week 4	2023	8.0	3	
Week 5	2023	8.2	3	
Week 6	2023	8.4	3	
Week 7	2023	8.6	3	
Week 8	2023	5.6	5	
Week 9	2023	7.9	4	
Week 10	2023	7.3	4	
Week 11	2023	7.1	4	
Week 12	2023	7.7	4	
Week 13	2023	7.2	3	
Week 14	2023	7.2	3	
Week 15	2023	7.5	4	
Week 16	2023	7.5	3	
Week 17	2023	7.4	3	
Week 18	2023	7.4	3	
Week 19	2023	7.5	2	
Week 20	2023	6.8	3	
Week 21	2023	6.9	1	
Week 22	2023	7.7	2	
Week 23	2023	7.1	2	

== Adaptations ==
Language	Title	Original release	Network(s)	Last aired	Notes
Bengali	Gouri Elo গৌরি এলো	28 February 2022	Zee Bangla	24 November 2023	Original
Odia	Maa Jahara Saha ମା ଜାହାର ସାହା	18 July 2022	Zee Sarthak	31 December 2022	Remake
Punjabi	Shivika ਸ਼ਿਵਿਕਾ	5 February 2024	Zee Punjabi	21 December 2024	Remake
