= Amader Ei Poth Jodi Na Sesh Hoy =

Indian Bengali Language Drama comedy romance

- Also known as: Amader Ei Poth Jodi Na Sesh Hoy
- Genre: Drama; Romance; Comedy; Family
- Created by: Crazy Ideas Media
- Screenplay by: Anandarupa
- Story by: Souvik Chakraborty
- Directed by: Krish Bose; Swarnendu Samaddar
- Creative directors: Sougata Mukherjee; Swarnendu Samadder
- Starring: Annwesha Hazra; Writwik Mukherjee; Riju Biswas
- Voices of: Samik
- Theme music composer: Nachiketa & Ankita
- Country of origin: India
- Original language: Bengali
- No. of episodes: 453

Production
- Executive producers: Priyajeet, Sourav & Abhinandan (Crazy Ideas); Shromona Ghosh & Raima Ganguly (Zee Bangla)
- Producers: Swarnendu Samaddar; Rupa Banerjee
- Cinematography: Vivek Ranjan Chatterjee
- Editors: Ayan, Dibakar & Subhadeep
- Camera setup: Multi camera
- Running time: 22 minutes
- Production company: Crazy Ideas Media

Original release
- Network: Zee Bangla
- Release: 12 April 2021 – 9 December 2022

Amader Ei Poth Jodi Na Sesh Hoy (transl. What If The Road Taken By Us Doesn't End) is an Indian Bengali language Romantic Comedy Drama television series that aired on the Indian Bengali General Entertainment Channel Zee Bangla and is also available on the digital platform ZEE5. It premiered on 12 April 2021 and starred Annwesha Hazra and Writwik Mukherjee in lead and popular actor Riju Biswas in an extended cameo.The series was produced by Crazy Ideas Media.

== Plot ==
Urmi Rakshit (Sarkar) is the granddaughter of a well-known industrialist, Rajat Shubhra Rakshit. After losing her father at a very young age in a car accident which also made her mother sick for a long time, she was brought up by her paternal aunt and uncle (Gayatree Rakshit and Hirak Subhra Rakshit) who pamper her. But unbeknownst to her, their motives are sinister. It is revealed to the viewers that they orchestrated the car accident in which Urmi's father was killed, and their goal is to keep Urmi under their control so they can ultimately take over her share of the family inheritance. Satyaki Sarkar is a taxi driver hailing from a middle-class joint family. He was a good student but had to give up his dreams in order to take care of his family, but he dreams of having his own app-cab company someday. They fall in love with each other. The rest of the story revolves around how they help each other and take an oath to stay beside each other throughout their lives.

== Cast ==
=== Main ===
- Annwesha Hazra as Urmi Sarkar (née Rakshit): Late Deepshubhra and Promita's daughter, Satyaki's wife, Hemanta and Shukla's declared daughter.
- Writwik Mukherjee as Satyaki Sarkar aka Tukai: Hemanta and Shukla's son, Urmi's husband, Late Deepshubhra and Promita's son-in-law .

=== Recurring ===
• Riju Biswas as Mr. Pawan Bhatiya (Extended Cameo)

- Abanti Dutta as Promita Rakshit: Urmi's mother; Satyaki's mother-in-law; Late Deepshubhra's wife; Rajat's eldest daughter-in-law.
- Sumanta Mukherjee as Rajat Shubhra Rakshit (Dadu): Urmi and Vicky's paternal grandfather; A businessman, founder and CEO of Rakshit Industries; Late Deepshubhra, Heerak Shubhra and Alok Shubhra's father; Promita, Gayatree and Kajol's father-in-law; Rama's friend.
- Rajat Ganguly as Shobhon Rakshit: A famous businessman; Urmi's elder paternal granduncle; Damayantee's husband, Rajat's paternal elder cousin brother.
- Tulika Basu as Damayantee Rakshit: Urmi's elder paternal grandaunt; Rajat's paternal elder cousin sister-in-law; Shobhon's wife.
- Anindya Chakrabarti / Avrajit Chakraborty as Heerak Shubhra Rakshit: Urmi's middle uncle 'Kaka', Rajat's middle son, Gayatree's husband, Vicky's father, Rini's father-in-law.
- Nabonita Dey as Gayatree Rakshit (née Ramanujan): Urmi's middle aunt 'Mamoni', Heerak's wife, Vicky's mother, Rini's mother-in-law, Rajat's middle daughter-in-law.
- Arindya Banerjee / Biswabasu Biswas as Shubhra Bikash Rakshit aka Vicky: Urmi's elder cousin brother 'Dadabhai', Gayatree and Heerak's only son, Rini's husband, Hemanta and Shukla's declared son.
- Priyam as Alok Shubhra Rakshit: Urmi's younger uncle 'Chhotokaka' aka 'Baghbabaji', Rajat's youngest son, Kajol's husband.
- Debdyuti Ghosh as Kajol Rakshit: Alok's wife, Urmi's younger aunt 'Kakimoni', Rajat's youngest daughter-in-law.
- Alokananda Roy / Kalyani Mondal / Kumkum Bhattacharya as Rama Sarkar: Satyaki's paternal grandmother aka 'Thammi Aunty', Late Ananta's wife, Hemanta and Sushanta's mother.
- Phalguni Chatterjee as Diganta Sarkar: Satyaki's younger paternal granduncle 'Chhordadu', Minu's husband, Jayanta and Bini's father.
- Manasi Sinha as Mrinalini Sarkar aka Minu: Satyaki's younger paternal grandaunt aka 'Chhoto Thammi'; Diganta's wife, Jayanta and Bini's mother.
- Rohit Mukherjee as Hemanta Sarkar aka Hemu: Satyaki's father, Rama's elder son, Shukla's husband; Urmi's declared father.
- Mayna Banerjee as Shukla Sarkar: Satyaki's mother; Rama's elder daughter-in-law, Hemanta's wife; Urmi's declared mother.
- Pradip Dhar as Sushanta Sarkar aka Bappa: Satyaki's uncle aka 'Mejka', Rama's younger son; Moli's husband; Mumu and Gouri's father; Suman's father-in-law.
- Suchandra Banerjee as Malini Sarkar aka Moli: Satyaki's paternal aunt aka 'Mejoma'; Bappa's wife; Mumu and Gouri's mother; Rama's younger daughter-in-law; Suman's mother-in-law
- Dwaipayan Das as Jayanta Sarkar aka Chhoton: Satyaki's uncle aka 'Chhotka'; Diganta and Minu's son; Priya's husband; Bini's younger brother.
- Smritika Majumder as Bandana Sarkar aka Bini: Satyaki's aunt, Diganta and Minu's daughter, Sudeep's wife, Mimi's mother.
- Payel Deb as Nandini Chakraborty (née Sarkar) aka Mumu: Satyaki's younger cousin sister, Bappa and Moli's daughter, Gouri's elder sister, Suman's wife.
- Mishmee Das as Rinita Rakshit aka Rini/Rita (née Biswas) - Satyaki's one-sided lover, neighbour and Satyaki's tuition student, Mimi's bestfriend, Vicky's wife
- Arpan Paul as Rohit Sarkar aka Gouri: Satyaki's younger cousin brother, Bappa and Moli's son, Mumu's younger brother.
- Tanushree Saha / Liza Sarkar as Riya Sarkar aka Mimi: Satyaki's youngest cousin sister, Bini and Sudeep's daughter.
- Rahul Banerjee as Nantu: The worker of the garage from where Satyaki bought his taxi "Bahandeb". He's like a family member of Sarkar Paribar and a younger brother to Urmi.
- Kunal Banerjee as Piklu Biswas: Rini's cousin brother, Mimi's lover.
- Arkajyoti Paul Chaudhury as Suman Chakraborty: Mumu's husband, Satyaki's younger cousin brother-in-law, Bappa and Moli's son-in-law, Gouri's elder brother-in-law.
- Shuvanan Dutta as Abhik: Suman's friend
- Ritoja Majumder as Sonali Biswas aka Sona: Shukla's elder sister, Satyaki's maternal aunt 'Sona Mashi'.
- Poonam Basak as Jini: Urmi's friend turned foe cum competitor.
- Chaitali Das as Babli: Urmi's close friend she also turned foe cum competitor.
- Sanghasri Sinha Mitra as Shakuntala Roy: Mumu's Would-be mother in law, But they faced a situation and they rejected Mumu.
- Arijita Mukhopadhyay as Miss Dutta aka Miss Bhayangkori: The admin head of a school where Satyaki works as a taxi driver.
- Ananda Chowdhury as Sagnik Bose: Kajol's childhood and school friend.
- Anindya Banerjee as Mr.Basu: lawyer who fights case against Satyaki.
- Swarnendu Samaddar as Raja Dutta: a director.
- Lama Halder as Sadananda Mitra: a former criminal minister, Urmi's declared brother.
- Subrata Guha Roy as Ananda Chakroborty: Suman's father.
- Aparajita Ghosh as Chanda Chakroborty: Suman's mother.
- Rhine Ghosh as Parna: Suman's sister.
- Ankita Biswas as Mohona Sengupta aka Meghbalika Mohona.
- Monika Dey as Tojo's mother.
- Judhajit Banerjee as Sudip: Satyaki's uncle, Diganta and Minu's son-in-law, Bini's husband, Mimi's father.
- Nabomita Chatterjee as Priya Sarkar (née Sharma): Satyaki's aunt aka 'Chhotki'; Diganta and Minu's daughter-in-law; Jayanta's wife; Bini's younger sister-in-law.
