= Rangiye Diye Jao =

- Title Company
- Genre: Drama; Comedy; Romance
- Created by: Chayabani Balaji Entertainment
- Written by: Shobhana Singh; Anil Nagpal; Shivapathan Nagpal; Kavita Nagpal
- Directed by: Tamal Maity; Dina Khan; Apsara Maity
- Creative director: Shivgatha Creation
- Starring: Jeetu Kamal; Tumpa Ghosh
- Country of origin: India
- Original language: Bengali
- No. of episodes: 135

Production
- Executive producers: Sajal Biswas; Idasha
- Producers: Saugata Nandi; Ekta Kapoor
- Production location: Kolkata
- Running time: 22 minutes
- Production company: Chayabani Balaji Entertainment

Original release
- Network: Zee Bangla
- Release: 11 December 2017 – 15 June 2018

Related
- Lagira Zala Ji

Rangiye Diye Jao is an Indian Bengali-language romance drama series that premiered on 11 December 2017 on Zee Bangla and stopped on 15 June 2018. The series is produced Saugata Nandi and Ekta Kapoor under their banner Chayabani Balaji Entertainment. Jeetu Kamal, Raja Ghosh and Tumpa Ghosh play the protagonists in the series. The series is a remake of Zee Marathi drama series Lagira Zala Ji.

== Plot ==
It revolves around the love for the nation and the love for the beloved. It is a patriotic, romantic comedy drama. Bablu (Jeetu Kamal) belongs to a small village called Begumpur. He is a dedicated follower of Netaji Subhash Chandra Bose and is nurturing a dream of joining Indian Army and serve the nation, for which he is preparing himself to achieve. Bablu has already lost his parents in a mine explosion and grows up in a village. Since he lost his parents in an explosion, he wants to be in the army and fight against the extremists. If needed, he is even ready to sacrifice his own life for his country. That's his ideology. Shiuli (Tumpa Ghosh) plays Bablu's love interest. Bablu and Shiuli, in spite of a sparkling chemistry between themselves, can't stand each other's presence. But slowly they fall in love. Later on, Shiuli's family arranges her marriage with Vikram, who turns out to be an illegal arms businessman. On the other side, Bablu gets chance in army training. Bablu, works with the army to capture Vikram and successes. Bablu marries Shiuli under the situation.

== Cast ==
- Jeetu Kamal as Bablu
- Raja Ghosh as Avijeet
- Tumpa Ghosh as Shiuli
- Phalguni Chatterjee as Shiuli's grandfather
- Chumki Chowdhury as Shiuli's Mother
- Soumi Banerjee as Shiuli's Close Friend
- Neil Chatterjee as Vikram
- Bipul Patra as Sahid Das
- Rohit Mukherjee as Avijeet's Father
- Reshmi Sen as Avijeet's Mother
- Simron Upadhyay as Avijeet's Sister
- Indranil Mallick as Avijeet's Brother
- Elfina Mukherjee as Avijeet's Sister
- Royshreemaa Das as Soumi

== Adaptations ==
Language	Title	Original release	Network(s)	Last aired	Notes
Marathi	Lagira Zala Ji लागिरं झालं जी	1 May 2017	Zee Marathi	22 June 2019	Original
Bengali	Rangiye Diye Jao রাঙিয়ে দিয়ে যাও	11 December 2017	Zee Bangla	15 June 2018	Remake
Punjabi	Kamli Ishq Di ਕਮਲੀ ਇਸ਼ਕ ਦੀ	13 January 2020	Zee Punjabi	11 June 2021	Remake
