= Raage Anuraage =

- Title poster
- রাগে অনুরাগে
- Genre: Drama; Romance
- Created by: Raj Chakraborty Productions
- Screenplay by: Sudip Paul
- Story by: Sahana Dutta
- Directed by: Debidas Bhattacharyya, Rajat Paul Swarnendu Samaddar
- Starring: Jeetu Kamal; Tumpa Ghosh
- Voices of: Madhuraa Bhattacharya; Supratik Das
- Composer: Debjit Roy
- Country of origin: India
- Original language: Bengali
- No. of seasons: 1
- No. of episodes: 583

Production
- Producer: Raj Chakraborty
- Production location: Kolkata
- Running time: 22 minutes
- Production company: Raj Chakraborty Productions

Original release
- Network: Zee Bangla
- Release: 28 October 2013 – 5 September 2015

Related
- Keya Patar Nouko; Goyenda Ginni

Raage Anuraage (Bengali: রাগে অনুরাগে) is a Bengali television Soap opera that premiered on 28 October 2013, and aired on Zee Bangla. Produced by Raj Chakraborty Productions, starred Jeetu Kamal, Anindya Chatterjee and Tumpa Ghosh. It fetched a highest TRP of 9.6 and beat its opponent with a huge margin, though the leading channel at that time was Star Jalsha.

== Plot ==
This story revolved around Mollar and Komol's life. A relation of love and hatred. For some people, music is the driving force of their lives. Mollar, the angry young man and owner of a music company who has his own rules and principles befriends Komol who comes from a music-loving family. 18-year-old Komol received her first music lessons from her father. She faced the most dreaded and unfortunate incident of her life when she ended up marrying forty-year-old Mollar. Mollar falls for Komol and remarried her but they faced many hurdles and overcome them.

== Cast ==
=== Main ===
- Jeetu Kamal as Mollar Sen- Komol's husband; Sreeradha's former husband; Gini, Pichku and Chini's father.

A 40 year old man who was owner of a music company where Komol used to sing in Kori's name, since she is blackmailed to do so. He married Komol, mistaking her as Kori, but he called his wife a cheater, after the discovery. However, he falls for Komol and thus accepts her as his wife and later consummates his marriage with her.

- Tumpa Ghosh as Komol Sen (née Banerjee) & her twin sister Kori Roy (née Banerjee)(Main Protagonist & Antagonist)
  - as Komol Sen as Mollar's wife; Gini, Pichku and Chini's step-mother: She was a talented, eighteen-year-old singer and used to sing for Mollar's company. But she faces the most unfortunate incident of her life when she marries him. Initially Mollar hated her for deceiving him, but eventually accepted her and she also fell in love with him.
  - as Kori Roy- Subho's wife:- She was initially jealous of her sister's singing skills. She also tried to take away Mollar's property from him by first impersonating as Komol, and then making him ill by giving him sleeping pills and then framed Komol for the same. Also she married Subho (Dr. Shubhankar Roy) only to save herself. But she was later caught.

=== Recurring ===
- Arnab Banerjee / Anindya Chatterjee as Dr. Subhankar Roy aka Subho
- Rajavi Roy as Chini, Ghini's sister
- Aishi Bhattacharya / Simron Upadhyay as Ghini, Chini's sister
- Manasi Sinha as Meera
- Ashmita Mukherjee as Deepti
- Sandip Chakraborty as Sumit
- Swagata Mukherjee / Sarbani

Chatterjee as Jaya

- Arijit Guha as Mahitosh Sen
- Alokananda Roy / Debika Mitra as Jayanti Sen
- Rajat Ganguly as Ananda Mohon Banerjee
- Mou Bhattacharya as Gouri Banerjee
- Ambarish Bhattacharya as Prashanta Banerjee
- Lopamudra Sinha as Sandhya Banerjee
- Sourav Chatterjee as Shuddhoraag Banerjee / Shuddho
- Chhanda Karanjee Chatterjee as Ananda, Mohon's mother
- Abanti Dutta as Subhankar's Mother
- Ankita Majumder as Damini
- Biplab Dasgupta as Himadri Mallick
- Ayesha Bhattacharya as Shinjini Mallick
- Arindam Saha as investigator Police Inspector.
- Aniket Chakraborty as Shinchan Mallick
- Sayantani Sengupta as Mollar's Assistant
- Sushmita Dey as Sreeradha Sen
- Supriyo Dutta as Komol's Doctor
- Saurav Das as Kartik
- Mohua Haldar as Kartik's Sister
- Ronnie Chakraborty as Subhankar's Brother
- Ranjini Chatterjee as Surama

=== Special appearances ===
- Anindya Chatterjee
- George Baker (actor)
- Rupankar Bagchi
- Upal Sengupta
- Usha Uthup
