= Chuni Panna =

2019 Indian TV series

- Genre: Drama; Comedy; Horror
- Created by: Sahana Dutta Telefilms
- Written by: Malobika Anamika
- Screenplay by: Sahana Dutta
- Directed by: Diptodeep Sengupta
- Creative directors: Krishnendu Biswas; Alongkara Maitra; Sahana Dutta
- Starring: Annwesha Hazra; Dibyojyoti Dutta; Tulika Basu
- Opening theme: Chunni Panna by Madhuraa
- Composer: Rishii Samidh
- Country of origin: India
- Original language: Bengali
- No. of episodes: 242

Production
- Executive producers: Sandip Chatterjee; Sajal Biswas; Rounak Chhabra
- Producers: Mahendra Soni; Durgasha Maitra
- Production location: Kolkata
- Running time: 22 minutes
- Production companies: Shree Venkatesh Films; SVF Durga TeleTalks

Original release
- Network: Star Jalsha
- Release: 11 November 2019 – 11 October 2020

Chuni Panna is a horror-comedy Bengali language television soap opera that was premiered on 11 November 2019 on Star Jalsha. It was produced by Shree Venkatesh Films, SVF Durga TeleTalks and starred Annwesha Hazra, Dibyojyoti Dutta and Tulika Basu as the leads along with Moyna Mukherjee, Debdut Ghosh, Payel De, Chhanda Chattopadhyay in pivotal roles.

== Premise ==
Throughout her childhood, Chuni aspires to be a ghost hunter. Chuni wants to meet a ghost but does not want to marry because she is scared of in-laws. Coincidentally, she grows up to marry Nirbhik, who lives in a haunted house "Abhoy Bhavan", (later on which turns out to be "Bhoy Bhavan") with a ghost called Panna. After the marriage, Panna, the vengeful ghost of the former owner of the house makes Chuni's life miserable.

== Cast ==
=== Main ===
- Anwesha Hazra as Chayanika Mallik aka Chuni
- Dibyojyoti Dutta as Nirbhik Mallik
- Tulika Basu as Pannalata Bose

=== Recurring ===
- Debdyut Ghosh as Ashutosh Sikhdar
- Moyna Mukherjee as Girijasundari Sikhdar
- Parthasarathi Deb as Narayan Mallick
- Prerana Bhattacharya as Poulomi Sikhdar
- Payel De as Madhuja Mallick, daughter-in-law of Mallick house
- Chhanda Chattopadhyay as Thammu
- Oindrila Saha as Lalita
- Gulshanara Khatun as Apsara
- Anindita Das as Gauri Mallick
- Arijita Mukhopadhyay as Sadhana Mallick
- Ayesha Bhattacharya as Rini Sikhdar
- Sourav Chatterjee as Kamal Mallick

== Adaptations ==
Language	Title	Original release	Networks(s)	Last aired	Notes
Bengali	Chuni Panna চুনি পান্না	11 November 2019	Star Jalsha	11 October 2020	Original
Hindi	Meri Saas Bhoot Hai मेरी सास भूत है	23 January 2023	Star Bharat	7 July 2023	Remake
