= Talmar Romeo Juliet =

2024 Indian Bengali romantic tragedy drama web series

- Release poster
- Genre: Romantic tragedy drama
- Based on: Romeo and Juliet by William Shakespeare
- Written by: Durbar Sharma
- Screenplay by: Durbar Sharma
- Directed by: Arpan Garai
- Starring: Debdutta Raha; Hiya Roy; Anirban Bhattacharya; Anujoy Chattopadhyay
- Theme music composer: Debraj Bhattacharya
- Composers: Debraj Bhattacharya; Anirban Bhattacharya; Balaram Kansabanik
- Country of origin: India
- Original language: Bengali
- No. of seasons: 1
- No. of episodes: 5

Production
- Producers: Shrikant Mohta; Mahendra Soni
- Cinematography: Soumik Halder
- Editor: Sanglap Bhowmik
- Camera setup: Single-camera
- Running time: 27-56 minutes
- Production company: Shree Venkatesh Films

Original release
- Release: 15 November 2024

Talmar Romeo Juliet is a 2024 Indian Bengali romantic tragedy drama web series streaming on the Bengali OTT platform Hoichoi. Directed by Arpan Garai in his directorial debut and written by Durbar Sharma, the series was produced by SVF. The series is a contemporary adaptation of the classic Romeo and Juliet by William Shakespeare. It is set in a small fictional village of Talma, where forbidden love arises between two lovers, belonging from families fighting against each other.

Debdutta Raha and Hiya Dutta play the titular roles in the series, marking their first series in a lead role. Anirban Bhattacharya and Anujoy Chattopadhyay play other pivotal roles. Anirban Bhattacharya is also the creative director for the series. The music was composed by Anirban Bhattacharya, Durbar Bhattacharya and Balaram Kansabanik. Sanglap Bhowmik did the editing while Soumik Halder handled the cinematography. The series was streamed on Hoichoi on 15 November 2024, to overall positive reviews from the critics.

== Plot ==
The series is based in a fictional village of Talma in North Bengal. Two influential families, the Majumders and the Liyaqats have age old conflict over land ownership. Rana is the younger son of the Majumder family and Jahanara is the only daughter of the Liyaqats. They fall in love with each other, despite knowing that their families are involved in a feud since their grandfathers, Badal and Liyaqat's time. Rana and Jahanara start secretly dating each other with Rana's fiends' and sister-in-law's help, so that their movements are not suspected in the small town of Talma.

In the meantime, the generational conflict gets more tensed up after a heated argument between Rana's elder brother Somanth and Jahanara's uncle Mostaq at the local police station. On the other hand, on the day of Dol, everyone found out about their relationship when Rana and Jahanara were romancing with colours. Hurriedly, the Liyaqats decided to fix her marriage with someone else. Hearing the news, Rana became mentally devastated. Sympathising with his condition, Somnath and Mousumi decided to help them elope. Also, both Rana and Jahanara believed that their marriage could be the only thing that could end this generational conflict. So, they secretly get married with the help of Rana's trusted friends, Deep and Papai.

But, this strategy of theirs fails, and in a violent conflict between the two families, the Majumders face a death. The tragic death, and the accompanying grief forced Rana to leave the village. To reunite once again with Rana and elope with him, Jahanara chalked out a plan. With the help of her close aide, she spread the news of her death. She thought that while everyone will assume she is death, she will be able to reunite with Rana and live somewhere far away from Talma, where no one will be able to know the truth. But the message carrying the details of her escape plan failed to reach Rana in time and he thought that Jahanara was truly dead. Grief-stricken, Rana returned to his village and took his own life since he believed that his existence is of no use without Jahanara. In the final scene, Jahanara is seen sitting beside Rana's dead body. There, she killed herself and lay dead beside Rana's dead body. Their deaths brings an extremely tragic but complete end to the age long feud and battle between the families.

== Cast ==
- Debdutta Raha as Rana, Badal's younger son
- Hiya Roy as Jahanara, Liyaqat's daughter
- Anirban Bhattacharya as Mostaq, Liyaqat's nephew
- Anujoy Chattopadhyay as Somanth, Badal's elder son
- Payel De as Mousumi, Somnath's wife
- Joydip Mukherjee as Liyaqat
- Kamaleshwar Mukhopadhyay as Badal Majumder
- Ujaan Chatterjee as Papai, Rana's friend
- Shiladitya Chatterjee as Deep, Rana's friend
- Buddhadev Das as Siddiqui, Mostaq's wingman

== Episodes ==
No.	Title	Directed by	Written by	Original release date
1	"Challenge Nibina Sala"	Arpan Garai	Durbar Sharma	November 15, 2024
2	"Sedin Dekha Hoyechilo"	Arpan Garai	Durbar Sharma	November 15, 2024
3	"Bojhena Shey Bojhena"	Arpan Garai	Durbar Sharma	November 15, 2024
4	"Batashey Gungun, Eseche Phagun"	Arpan Garai	Durbar Sharma	November 15, 2024
5	"Naamey Ki Eshe Jay"	Arpan Garai	Durbar Sharma	November 15, 2024

== Production ==
=== Announcement ===
Talmar Romeo Juliet was announced by Hoichoi on 15 October 2024, along with 10 other series, including Dainee, Bishohori and Puro Puri Eken. It was announced to be a modern contemporary adaptation of William Shakespeare's timeless romantic tragedy classic The Tragedy of Romeo and Juliet.

=== Development ===
Durbar Sharma adapted Romeo Juliet and developed the contemporary story around an age old family rivalry and forbidden love. The director himself being from Jalpaiguri, helped the whole cast to learn the accent of North Bengal, which has been used in the series. Upon the writer Durbar Sharma's instigation, Anirban Bhattacharya wrote few songs for the series. Bhattacharya, being the creative director for the series, was also a part of the team which selected the location for filming.

Anirban Bhattacharya mentioned in an interview that Talmar Romeo Juliet is not only a modern retelling of an age old classic, but also an experiment to observe how a story from a different era and place is still applicable and relatable in the setting of a small fictional North Bengal village, Talma. Debdutta Raha and Hiya Roy were chosen to play the role of Romeo and Juliet, respectively. This marked the first film in lead roles for both the actors.

=== Casting ===
Debdutta Raha was cast in the role of Romeo. He was cast in the series after the director Arpan Garai and Anirban Bhattacharya saw his performance as Monirul in Indubala Bhaater Hotel. Hiya Dutta was called upon for audition by Anirban and Arpan after watching her performance in a small role in the Hoichoi series Jaatishwar. She was selected and cast in the role of Juliet. Anirban Bhattacharya was cast in the role of Tybalt, Juliet's uncle. Being friends with Durbar, Anujoy knew about the project when Durbar started working on the script. Later, Durbar and the director offered Anujoy the role of Benvolio, which he accepted. Payel De joined the cast in mid-May, 2024.

=== Pre production ===
Debdutta Raha and Hiya Roy had workshop sessions for seven months before the filming was started. The director Arpan Garai trained and groomed them for six months. It included rigorous acting classes, exercises and workshops. Anirban Bhattacharya joined as their workshop teacher for the seventh month. Raha spoke in an interview that he had to practice football for six to seven months owing to this character in the series and even succumbed multiple injuries due to it.

Arpan Garai and Durbar Sharma read the script to Anirban Bhattacharya and offered him the role of Tybalt from the original play. They also asked him to join as the creative director in the project and get involved in the music production, owing to his experience and passion for contemporary adaptations of Shakespearean plays. As a creative director, Anirban handled the creative balance, scale, aesthetics, production and execution of the series. Anirban got Debraj Bhattacharya and Subhaddep Guha on board to produce and compose the music of the series. Balaram Kansabanik joined later for composing a few more songs. Anirban used two songs in the series, whose rights he had acquired back in 2021.

There was extensive pre production work for one and a half years before the filming started. It included script writing, ideation, casting, deciding shooting location, costumes and colour palette. The major part of the filming was done in and around Jalpaiguri. Hiya Roy mentioned in an interview that her intimate and sensual scenes in the series were explained to her well before, in the workshop. She also mentioned that, since Debdutta also belonged from the same hometown as hers, they easily developed a bonding and it became easier for her to shoot the intimate scenes with least discomfort.

== Music ==
Talmar Romeo Juliet

Soundtrack album by Debraj Bhattacharya, Anirban Bhattacharya, Balaram Kansabanik
- Released: 2024
- Recorded: 2024
- Studio: 7 Notes Studio
- Length: 29:50
- Language: Bengali
- Label: SVF Music

The music for the series have been composed by Debraj Bhattacharya, Anirban Bhattacharya and Balaram Kansabanik. It includes songs across romance, tragedy, rap and folk genres. The lyrics have been penned by Nilanjan Ghosal, Anirban Bhattacharya and Balaram Kansabanik.

The first song "Du Haatey Mutho Bhorey" was released on 27 October 2024. The second song "Laal Rong" was released on 5 November 2024. The third song "Bhalobasha Jaari Achhey" was released on 14 November 2024. The fourth song "Talma RAP" Was released on 17 November 2024. The extended lead cast of Talmar Romeo Juliet was featured in the music video. It served as a promotional song to the series.

Track listing
No.	Title	Lyrics	Music	Singer(s)	Length
1.	"Du Haatey Mutho Bhorey"	Nilanjan Ghosal	Debraj Bhattacharya	Debraj Bhattacharya	4:27
2.	"Laal Rong"	Anirban Bhattacharya	Debraj Bhattacharya	Debraj Bhattacharya	4:26
3.	"Bhalobasha Jaari Achhey"	Anirban Bhattacharya	Anirban Bhattacharya, Balaram Kansabanik	Debraj Bhattacharya, Surangana Bandopadhyay	2:49
4.	"Talma RAP"	Anirban Bhattacharya	Anirban Bhattacharya	Anirban Bhattacharya	2:07
5.	"Du Haatey Mutho Bhorey (Sad Version)"	Nilanjan Ghosal	Debraj Bhattacharya	Debraj Bhattacharya, Anirban Bhattacharya	3:03
6.	"Mon Jaaney Naa"	Balaram Kansabanik	Balaram Kansabanik	Iman Chakraborty	4:30
7.	"Sona Bondhu Re"	Balaram Kansabanik	Anirban Bhattacharya	Balaram Kansabanik, Subhadeep Guha (Rap), Debraj Bhattacharya	2:59
8.	"Mon Jaane Naa (Duet Version)"	Balaram Kansabanik	Balaram Kansabanik	Iman Chakraborty, Balaram Kansabanik	4:29
Total length:					29:50

== Release ==
Talmar Romeo Juliet was premiered on the Bengali OTT platform Hoichoi on 15 November 2024.

== Marketing ==
The first poster of Talmar Romeo Juliet was revealed on 2 November 2024. It was announced as part of Hoichoi's "Hoichoi World Classics" project. The lead cast of Debdutta Raha, Hiya Roy, Anirban Bhattacharya and Anujoy Chattopadhyay, along with the remaining cast were also revealed along with it.

The teaser for the series was released on 19 October 2024. It marked the next Hoichoi World Classic project after Mandaar. The trailer was released on 7 November 2024. It was unveiled at a launch event hosted in Kolkata.

== Reception ==
=== Critical reception ===
Subhasmita Kanji of the Hindustan Times rated the series 4.2/5 stars and wrote "If the script is the Romeo of this series, the music is the Juliet. It is a simple romantic story which encompasses the elements of romance, tragedy, anguish, enmity and revenge." She praised the use of regional dialect, the performance of the extended cast, the cinematography and the storytelling. Debarshi Bandyopadhyay of Anandabazar Patrika rated the series 6.5/10 stars and applauded the chemistry between the new pair, the bonding between Rana and his friends, and the screenplay but bemoaned the repetitive pattern in Anirban's direction and the similarity to his previous works Mandaar and Athhoi.

Poorna Banerjee of The Times of India rated the series 3/5 stars and highlighted "Apart from the name and general plot direction, Talmar Romeo Juliet has little or nothing to do with the Shakespearean classic. The main plot and the subplots are interwoven slowly into a fast climax that could have done better at a slower pace. Despite that, Talmar Romeo Juliet is a good addition to Hoichoi’s cache of web series." She praised Debdutta and Hiya's strong debut performances besides the seasoned supporting cast, Soumik Halder's cinematography and the raw somatic acting in each frame. But she criticized the uneven episode lengths, continuity issues, dialogues and the accent.

Agnivo Niyogi of The Telegraph reviewed the series and opined "What sets Talmar Romeo Juliet apart is its commitment to capturing the essence of North Bengal’s cultural idiosyncrasies. Visually, it is a treat to the senses. There’s an overreliance on violence and gritty visuals that, while effective in creating atmosphere, tend to overshadow the tender moments." He praised the intensity of rivalry between Anujoy and Anirban, the visually vibrant landscapes and the soundtrack which captures forbidden love. But he bemoaned the lengthy world building and Anirban's character's similarity with his previous roles in Mandaar and Athhoi.

Shamayita Chakraborty of OTTplay rated the series 3.5/5 stars and worded "Talmar Romeo Juliet is an entertaining Bengali show that cannot be missed. One can revisit the show a number of times to absorb the tremendous teamwork that the makers – Arpan, Durbar, and Anirban – have put forward. Each of the actors deserves to be lauded. Each song has to be hummed. And many scenes have to be revisited." She praised the duel between Mostaq and Somanth, and termed it as Anirban's best work in terms of creative direction. But she bemoaned the paint brushed roles of the female characters and the extra loud background score.

Parama Dasgupta of Aajkal reviewed the series and noted "The only thing common between Romeo and Juliet and this series is the title and the core theme. Durbar Sharma has woven a different storyline, keeping the core story constant." She praised Debdutta and Hiya, the fierce battle between Somnath and Mostaq, the performance of the remaining cast and the vibrant cinematography but criticized the over lengthy episodes, hurried climax and the overall similarity of the series with Anirban's previous Shakespeare adaptations.

Anupam Roy reviewed the series for t2 Online and opined "At its core, Talmar Romeo Juliet is a story of love, loss, hope, and despair, woven through a world where the past and present are in constant tension." He praised the storytelling, blend of modernity with tradition, the performance of everyone in the cast and the visually enriched cinematography. Raj Chakraborty reviewed the series for Sangbad Pratidin and wrote "The series depicts a rural story of love, tragedy, friendship, celebration and grief." He praised the performance of everyone in the cast, the bonding and enmity between the characters, the editing, cinematography and the music. He especially applauded Anirban Bhattacharya for his creative direction in the series.
