= Nishir Daak =

- Genre: Supernatural; Drama; Horror
- Created by: Shree Venkatesh Films
- Screenplay by: Paramita Munsi Bhattacharjee
- Story by: Sahana Dutta
- Directed by: Argha Paik
- Starring: Tumpa Ghosh; Sukanya Chatterjee; Sairity Banerjee; Shoumo Banerjee
- Voices of: Madhuraa Bhattacharya
- Country of origin: India
- Original language: Bengali
- No. of seasons: 1
- No. of episodes: 407

Production
- Producers: Shrikant Mohta; Mahendra Soni
- Production location: Kolkata
- Running time: 22 minutes
- Production company: Shree Venkatesh Films

Original release
- Network: Colors Bangla
- Release: 3 December 2018 – 28 March 2020

Nishir Daak (transl. Call of the night) was an Indian Bengali-language supernatural television soap opera that premiered on 3 December 2018 and aired on Colors Bangla; it is also available on the digital platform Voot. The show was produced under the banner of Shree Venkatesh Films. The show stars Tumpa Ghosh and Shubhankar Saha (later replaced by Soumyo Banerjee) in lead roles, Sairity Banerjee (later replaced by Geetashree Roy) in a negative role, and Sukanya Chatterjee and Sandip in other prominent supporting roles.

== Plot ==
The series involves Shreemoyee protecting her daughter Tara, who is in great danger.

== Cast ==
- Tumpa Ghosh as Shreemoyee: Rudra's wife, Tara's adoptive mother and Chaya's biological mother
- Shubhankar Saha / Shoumo Banerjee as Rudra: Shreemoyee's husband and Chaya's and Tara's father
- Sairity Banerjee / Geetasree Roy as Nishi : a kind of Pishachini. (Deceased)( after some years she knows as Mahanishi
- Sukanya Chatterjee as Tara: Shreemoyee's child
- Sharmila Das as Rudra's aunt and Rudra's Father's and Mother's Sister in law.
- Sandip Dey as Aghornathoo: Tara's biological father
- Manishankar Banerjee as Rudra's Father and Shreemoyee's and Nishi's Father in Law. Tulshi's Husband
- Piyali Basu as Guruma
- Dola Chakraborty as Rudra's aunt a.k.a. Pishimoni
- Tanushree Bhattacharya Bose as Rimjhim :Rudra's friend
- Elfina Mukherjee as Rudra's Sister and Tulshi's Daughter.
- Kanyakumari Mukherjee as The Goddes Maa kali.
- Minakshi Ghosh as Tara's biological mother, Aghornath's wife
- Srabanti Malakar as Sreemoyee's aunt
- Tanushree Saha / Shakshi Roy as Rudra's sister, (Pishimoni's daughter)
- Sreeja Kirti as Damori/Nishi's daughter
- Moumita Gupta as Tulsi, Shreemoyee's mother-in law.
- Maffin Chakraborty as Pisimoni: Roha Naggin
- Chandrayee Ghosh as jorasondhi: pishachini
- Nilotpal Banerjee as Siddhartha: Rudra's friend
- Siddhartha Shankar Chakroborty as Nishi's Husband. Tulshi's Second Son. Damori's Father. (Deceased)
- Chaitali Chakroborty as Nishi's Mother / guruma. (Daini)
