= Film Farm India =

Indian production house

Film Farm India Pvt. Ltd.
- Industry: Entertainment
- Founded: 2004;21 years ago
- Founders: Pintoo Guha; Rupali Guha
- Headquarters: Mumbai, India; New Delhi, India
- Key people: Pintoo Guha; Rupali Guha
- Products: Television programs
- Website: Official Website

Film Farm India is a production house based in Mumbai. It produces Indian soap operas for various channels like Zee TV and Colors TV. It is founded and established in 2004 by Pintoo and Rupali Guha.

== Productions ==
Year	Serial	Channel
2004–2006	Tumhari Disha	Zee TV
2007–2009	Rakhi	Zee TV
2008–2015	Uttaran	Colors
2010	Kashi – Ab Na Rahe Tera Kagaz Kora	Imagine TV
2010–2011	Dil Se Diya Vachan	Zee TV
2013-2016	Asava Sundar Swapnancha Bangla	Colors Marathi
2011	Mandala Don Ghadicha Dav	Zee Marathi
2013–2014	Do Dil Bandhe Ek Dori Se	Zee TV
2014–2016	Ka Re Durava	Zee Marathi
2015	Zindagi Khatti Meethi	Disney Channel India
2015–2016	Ishq Ka Rang Safed	Colors
2017-2018	Chakradhari Ajay Krishna	Big Magic
2018	Home	ALT Balaji
2018	Perfect Pati	&TV
2020	Mentalhood	ALT Balaji
2022	Rang Jaun Tere Rang Mein	Dangal TV
2022	Gud Se Meetha Ishq	Star Bharat
2021–2023	Thipkyanchi Rangoli	Star Pravah
2023	Meri Saas Bhoot Hai	Star Bharat

== Awards ==
Year	Award	Category	For
2010	Indian Television Academy Awards	Gr8! Ensemble Cast	Uttaran
2010	Indian Telly Awards	Most Popular Daily Serial	Uttaran
