= Eta Amader Golpo =

2024 Indian Bengali film

- Theatrical Release Poster
- Directed by: Manasi Sinha
- Screenplay by: Debapratim Dasgupta
- Story by: Manasi Sinha
- Produced by: Subhash Bera; Suvankar Mitra
- Starring: Saswata Chatterjee; Aparajita Adhya; Sohag Sen; Koneenica Banerjee
- Cinematography: Amlan Saha
- Edited by: Anirban Maity
- Music by: Pranjal Das; Kharaj Mukherjee
- Production company: Dhagaa Production
- Distributed by: SSR Cinemas
- Release date: 26 April 2024
- Running time: 128 minutes
- Country: India
- Language: Bengali
- Box office: ₹2.1 crore

Eta Amader Golpo (transl. This is Our Story) is a 2024 Bengali language romantic drama film directed by Manasi Sinha. The film stars Saswata Chatterjee, Aparajita Adhya, Sohag Sen and Koneenica Banerjee in the lead roles. Debdut Ghosh, Kharaj Mukherjee, Tareen Jahan, Arya Dasgupta and Pooja Karmakar play other pivotal roles. It is produced by Subhash Bera and Suvankar Mitra under the banner of Dhagaa Production.

This film marked the directorial debut of Manasi Sinha. It also marked the Tollywood debut of Bangladeshi actress Tareen Jahan. Pranjal Das and Kharaj Mukherjee did the music while Anirban Maity handled the editing. It was released in the theatres on 26 April 2024 to positive reviews from the critics and audience alike. It was a surprise hit at the box office.

== Plot ==
Sritama Dutta is an old Bengali widow who lives with her son, daughter-in-law and granddaughter. Despite having a big family, she is depressed and lonely somewhere deep down in her heart. To overcome this loneliness, she goes for a morning walk every day and attends a Laughter Club. But after returning home, once again she becomes sad and melancholic. The disagreement on several opinions and arguments with her daughter-in-law made her all the more unhappy. On the other side, Praveen Sharma is an old Punjabi bachelor who also visits the same Laughter Club. Unlike her, he is merry and joyous despite his age. Being a witness to the discontent in the disconsolate married life between his brother and his wife Simran, he decided to not marry in his life.

But things fell in place, and he fell in love with Sritama. Soon, they start spending more time together. Often after the Laughter Club was over, he took her to Nityo Da's teashop. The story shows how two different people can fulfill the void in each other's lives; Praveen is an evergreen and highly agile man, and on the other hand, Sritama is solemn and grief-stricken.

In this way, after spending more days together, visiting the parks, the couple lanes and the teashop, Praveen decided to propose to Sritama to marry him. One day he proposed to Sritama to be his wife. This brought immense anger and discontent among Sritama's family members. But after a lot of drama and perplexity, she agreed to tie the knot with Praveen. The film depicts the journey of this senile couple from falling in love to marriage through apt comedy and deep emotions. It showed the social stigmas, cultural differences, and emotional values attached to old people falling in love and the difficulties of overcoming them. At the end, the film conveyed the message that if the right person comes into one's life, his or her dull life can become vibrant and cheerful, no matter what their age is.

== Cast ==
- Saswata Chatterjee as Praveen Sharma
- Aparajita Adhya as Sritama
- Sohag Sen as Praveen's paternal aunt
- Amit Kanti Ghosh as Praveen's brother
- Koneenica Banerjee as Simran, Praveen's brother's wife
- Arya Dasgupta as Vicky, Praveen's brother's son
- Gautam Saha
- Pooja Karmakar as Joyee, Sritama's granddaughter
- Debdut Ghosh as Mr. Basu, Sritama's son
- Tareen Jahan as Mrs. Basu, Sritama's daughter-in-law
- Kharaj Mukherjee as Nityo Da, a teashop owner
- Tapati Munshi
- Juiee Sarkar as Sritama's daughter
- Judhajit Bannerjee as Sritama's son-in-law

== Production ==
=== Development and Filming ===
The first look of the lead characters of the film was released in the second week of June 2022. The first poster of the film was released on 14 February 2024. The filming has been done in parts of North Kolkata and South Kolkata.

=== Marketing ===
The teaser of the film was dropped on 16 March 2024. The trailer was released at an event at Hard Rock Cafe, Kolkata. It was released on Zee Music Bangla YouTube channel on 19 April 2024. The music of the film was launched on 23 March 2024 at a grand event at Lord of the Drinks, Kolkata. Prosenjit Chatterjee was present as the special guest at the special screening of the film.

== Soundtrack ==
Eta Amader Golpo

Soundtrack album by Pranjal Das and Kharaj Mukherjee
- Released: 2024
- Recorded: 2023–24
- Venue: DTB
- Studios: Muzik House Studios; DTB; Violina Studio
- Genre: Film soundtrack
- Length: 28:29
- Language: Bengali
- Label: Zee Music Bangla
- Producers: Subhash Bera; Suvankar Mitra
External audio
- Eta Amader Golpo - Audio Jukebox on YouTube

The music of the film has been composed by Pranjal Das and Kharaj Mukherjee. The lyrics have been written by Pranjal Das and Sumit Samadder.

The first single "Eta Amader Golpo - Title Track" was released on 23 March 2024. The second single "Tumi Ektu Kebol Boste Dio (Male Version)" was released on 30 March 2024. It is an adaptation of a Rabindra Sangeet by the same name.

The third song "Main Hoon Tera Heer" was dropped on 5 April 2024. The fourth song "Tumi Ektu Kebol Boste Dio (Female Version)" was released on 10 April 2024. The fifth song "Sweet Sixteen" was dropped on 15 April 2024. The sixth single "Eta Amader Golpo Title Track - Reprised Female" was dropped on 21 April 2024. The seventh and last song "Eta Amader Golpo Title Track - Reprised Male" was released on 24 April 2024.

Track listing
| No. | Title | Lyrics | Singer(s) | Length |
|---|---|---|---|---|
| 1. | "Tumi Ektu Kebol Boste Dio (Male Version)" | Rabindranath Tagore | Srikanto Acharya | 3:02 |
| 2. | "Tumi Ektu Kebol Boste Dio (Female Version)" | Rabindranath Tagore | Jayati Chakraborty | 4:31 |
| 3. | "Sweet Sixteen" | Sumit Samadder | Kharaj Mukherjee | 4:17 |
| 4. | "Main Hoon Tera Heer" | Pranjal Das | Alaap Bose, Kajol Chatterjee, Manaswita Thakur | 3:47 |
| 5. | "Eta Amader Golpo - Title Track" | Pranjal Das | Lagnjita Chakraborty | 3:30 |
| 6. | "Eta Amader Golpo (Reprised Female)" | Pranjal Das | Megha Biswas | 4:44 |
| 7. | "Eta Amader Golpo (Reprised Male)" | Pranjal Das | Saunak Sarkar | 4:40 |
| Total length: | | | | 28:29 |

== Reception ==
=== Box office ===
The film earned around ₹31 lakhs in the first week. After one month, it collected over ₹1.76 crore. The film grossed over ₹2 crore and emerged as an unexpected blockbuster.

=== Critical reception ===
Sanjukta Basu Anandabazar Patrika rated the film 6 out of 10 stars. She reviewed the film on a positive note and wrote "The film proves the idea that people can fall in love with each other irrespective of their age bracket." She praised Sinha for her debut directorial skills, the depth of the characters, their acting and the chemistry between the senile lead pair. Suparna Majumder of Sangbad Pratidin reviewed the film on a positive note and wrote "The film successfully displays old school love in the modern generation. The songs are apt and Kharaj Mukherjee surprised as a singer." She also praised Sinha's directorial skills in her debut.

Shamayita Chakraborty of OTTplay rated the film 3 out of 5 stars and termed it as "A simple and easy-flowing family drama." She mentioned that it lacks nuances and is too simplistic with a fairly predictable ending. Subhodeep Bandyopadhyay of The Wall rated the film 7 out of 10 stars. He termed it as a "Complete family cinema". She praised the director for successfully showing a deep social issue; love between two elderly people in a light way with the help of comedy and emotions. He also praised the screenplay, music and the roles of all other actors but criticized Saswata for overacting at certain points. Alokprasad Chattyopadhyay of Aajkal rated the film on a positive note. He wrote "Sinha proves her directorial mettle in her debut film. Instead of taking any formulaic approach, Sinha wrote a different film. Saswata and Aparajita have played their roles with utter precision."
