= Agnijal =

TV series

- Genre: Period Drama; Romance fantasy
- Created by: Shree Venkatesh Films
- Written by: Concept; Sahana Dutta; Dialogues; Sharbari Ghoshal & Suparna Chowdhury
- Directed by: Anupam Hari
- Starring: Rohit Samanta; Tumpa Ghosh; Sudip Mukherjee; Sohini Sanyal; Rudrajit Mukherjee
- Opening theme: Agnijal by Various
- Composer: Upaali Chatterjee
- Country of origin: India
- Original language: Bengali
- No. of seasons: 4
- No. of episodes: 241

Production
- Producers: Shrikant Mohta; Mahendra Soni
- Production location: Kolkata
- Running time: 22 minutes
- Production company: Shree Venkatesh Films

Original release
- Network: Star Jalsha
- Release: 21 November 2016 – 23 July 2017

Agnijal is a Bengali period romantic drama that was premiered on 21 November 2016, and aired on Star Jalsha. It was produced by Shree Venkatesh Films. It starred Rohit Samanta and Tumpa Ghosh in lead roles and Sudip Mukherjee as antagonist.

== Plot ==
Set in medieval India, it is about lust for power, conspiracies, battles and the magical love story of Prince Debdakhya and Souraja, a devadasi. Agnijal is a story of Sahashra Nagari, where a king Dev Daksha falls in love with a Devdasi named Souraja. But the Acharya of the temple Dhiratna opposes their love. Dev Daksha is the prince of Sahashra Nagari and son of King Dev Varma and queen Bedantika. Dev Daksha has two younger brothers and two younger sisters. Among them Gangeyo is the best friend of Dev Daksha. But Gangeyo's Mother, second wife of King Dev Varma, Tamakshi didn't like Dev Daksha and always wanted Gangeyo would be the future king of Sahashra Nagari. But after the accidental death of Dev Varma, Dev Daksha became the king and fell in love with the Devdasi of Lalataksha temple, Souraja. Souraja's Mother Kalabati always kept Souraja away from Acharya Dhiratna as she doesn't want that her daughter will also be a Devdasi like her. But clever Dhiratna find Souraja and announces that Souraja will be the next Devdasi of the temple. Finally one day Dev Daksha marries Souraja to protect her from the hands of Dhiratna.

== Cast ==
- Payel De / Adrija Roy as Ma Singhobahini
- Rohit Samanta as Raja Dev Daksha
- Tumpa Ghosh as Devdasi Souroja / Rani Sourojini
- Sudip Mukherjee as Acharya Dhiratna
- Rudrajit Mukherjee as Gangeyo
- Bimol Roy as Old Gangeyo
- Diya Mukherjee as Sambhaba
- Rita Dutta Chakraborty as Rani Vedantika
- Rajat Ganguly as Raja Dev Varma
- Tulika Basu as Rani Tamakshi
- Namita Chakraborty as Vedantika's Well wisher
- Sohini Sanyal as Devdasi Kalabati
- Pushpita Mukherjee as Dhaima
- Ranjini Chattopadhyay as Vedantika's Well wisher
- Manishankar Banerjee as Tamonash
- Priyanka Bhattacharjee as Atreyi
- Samriddho as Abhigyan
- Chaitali Chakraborty as Tamakshi's Well wisher
- Sushmita Dey as Tamakshi's Well wisher
- Sahana Sen as Shubhangi
- Rupsha Ghuha as Karali
- Payel Roy as Kuokini
- Sairity Banerjee as Jaadukori
- Deetya Das as Sarbamangala
