= Chandreyee Ghosh =

Indian actress

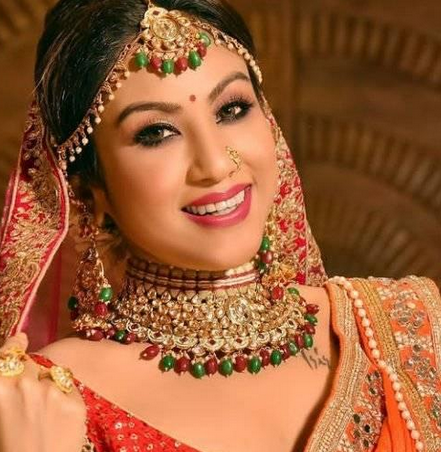
- Occupations: Actress; Director
- Years active: 2004–present
- Notable work: Montu Pilot, Kiranmala, Behula

Chandreyee Ghosh is an Indian Bengali actress who predominantly works in the Bengali film industry. Ghosh made her on-screen debut with the film Mahulbonir Sereng in 2004. She made her television debut with the lead role in the Zee Bangla television soap Labonner Sansar in 2007. She gained further recognition after portraying the role of Manasa in Behula aired on Star Jalsha in 2010. With a pivotal role in Montu Pilot, she made her web series debut in 2019.

== Career ==
Ghosh made her film debut in Sekhar Das's Mohulbanir Sereng, followed by Tista in 2005, Manush Bhut and Dosar in 2006 and Kaal in 2007. In 2008/09, she announced the beginning of her directorial venture with Sama. The film, which dwells on homosexuality, was, according to her, based on her own story, and the music was to be composed by the actor Parambrata Chatterjee. She said, "I was mentally preparing myself to step into direction for a long time," and "I now have the confidence to go ahead with this independent project." However, the film was never completed or released.

She has also been in several television serials, such as Raat Bhor Brishti, Uttaron and Mohona. She was next scheduled to appear in a mega-serial, Dushaha Bash, based on Taslima Nasreen’s work, which dealt with the lives of three sisters. However, the serial was shelved before airing due to controversy and never made it to broadcast. She also had a successful stint with comedy in the serial Labonor Sansar, which was telecast on Zee Bangla.

She is currently active with a number of serials, among them the major ones include Behula (as the Hindu Goddess Manasa), Ekhane Aakash Neel, Sindoorkhela, Kiranmala, Debipaksha, Bodhu Kon Alo Laaglo Chokhe, Ami Sirajer Begum and Jai Kali Kalkattawali all eight telecast on Free-to-Air Channel Star Jalsa.

== Filmography ==
Year	Title	Character
2004	Mahulbonir Sereng	Saheli
2005	Tista	
2006	Dosar	Mita Ray
2006	Manush Bhut	
2007	Kaal	
2009	Kaaler Rakhal	
2013	Tiyasha	Riya
2016	Kuheli	
2017	61 Garpar Lane	Minu
2011	Necklace	
2011	Hatey Roilo Pistol	
2020	Cheeni	Psychologist
2021	Mukhosh	Kaberi Bose
2021	Binisutoy	Jenny
2023	Mayar Jonjal	
2025	Binodini: Ekti Natir Upakhyan	Ganga Bai
2025	Lokkhikantopur Local	Malati

== Television ==
Year	Title	Role	Channels
2007–2009	Labanyar Sansar	Labonnyo	Zee Bangla
2008	Raat Bhor Brishti	Riya	Zee Bangla
2008–2010	Ekhane Aakash Neel	Dr.Deepa	Star Jalsha
2010–2011	Behula	Manasa	Star Jalsha
2010–2011	Sindoorkhela	Debi Roy Chowdhury	Star Jalsha
2012–2014	Bodhu Kon Alo Laaglo Chokhe	Debjani Moitra / Debi	Star Jalsha
2014–2016	Kiranmala	Rakshashi Rani Kotkoti	Star Jalsha
2017	Debipakshya	Rajrajeshwari Deb Burman / Amma	Star Jalsha
2017	Jai Kali Kalkattawali	Jyotishrani Radharani	Star Jalsha
2018–2019	Ami Sirajer Begum	Ghaseti Begum	Star Jalsha
2019	Thakumar Jhuli	Rakshasi Konkoni	Star Jalsha
2019	Nishir Daak	Jorasondhi	Colors Bangla
2021	Agnishikha	Rekha Chakraborty	Sun Bangla
2022–2023	Gouri Elo	Shailaja Ghoshal: aka Shailamaa	Zee Bangla
2022–2024	Phaguner Mohona	Madhumita Sen	Sun Bangla
2024	Tumi Ashe Pashe Thakle	Lady Police officer	Star Jalsha
2024–2026	Rangamati Tirandaj	Promita Basu	Star Jalsha
2026-Present	Saat Paake Bandha	Ranjini Mitra	Zee Bangla

== Web series ==
Year	Title	Role	Language	Network	Notes
2019	Montu Pilot	Bibijan	Bengali	MX Player	
2020	Kark Rogue	Indulekha Agarwal	Hindi, Bengali	ZEE5	
2020	Damayanti	Munia Roy	Bengali	MX Player	
2020	Black Widow	Silvia	Hindi	ZEE5	
2020	Break Up Story	Aparna	Bengali	Hoichoi	
2022	Montu Pilot (Season 2)	Bibijan	Bengali	Hoichoi	
2023	P I Meena	Health Secretary	Hindi	Amazon Prime Video	

== Awards ==
Year	Award	Category	Character	Film/TV show
2005	BFJA Award	Most Promising Actress	Saheli	Mahulbonir Sereng
2015	Star Jalsha Parivar Awards 2015	Sera Khalnayika	Kotkoti	Kiranmala
2023	Zee Bangla Sonar Sansar Awards 2023	Sera Khalnayika	Shoilo Maa	Gouri Elo
2025	Star Jalsha Parivar Awards 2025	Priyo Maa	Promita	Rangamati Tirandaj
2025	Tele Academy Awards 2025	Priyo Sashuri	Promita	Rangamati Tirandaj
2025	TV 9 Bangla Ghorer Bioscope Awards 2025	Best Supporting Actress TV Serial	Promita	Rangamati Tirandaj
2026	BFJA Award	Best Actress in a Supporting Role	Malati	Lokkhikantapur Local
2026	Star Jalsha Parivar Awards 2026	Priyo Sashuri	Promita	Rangamati Tirandaj
2026	Star Jalsha Parivar Awards 2026	Priyo Misti Somporko	Promita-Rangamoti	Rangamati Tirandaj
