= Manasi Sinha =

Indian actress

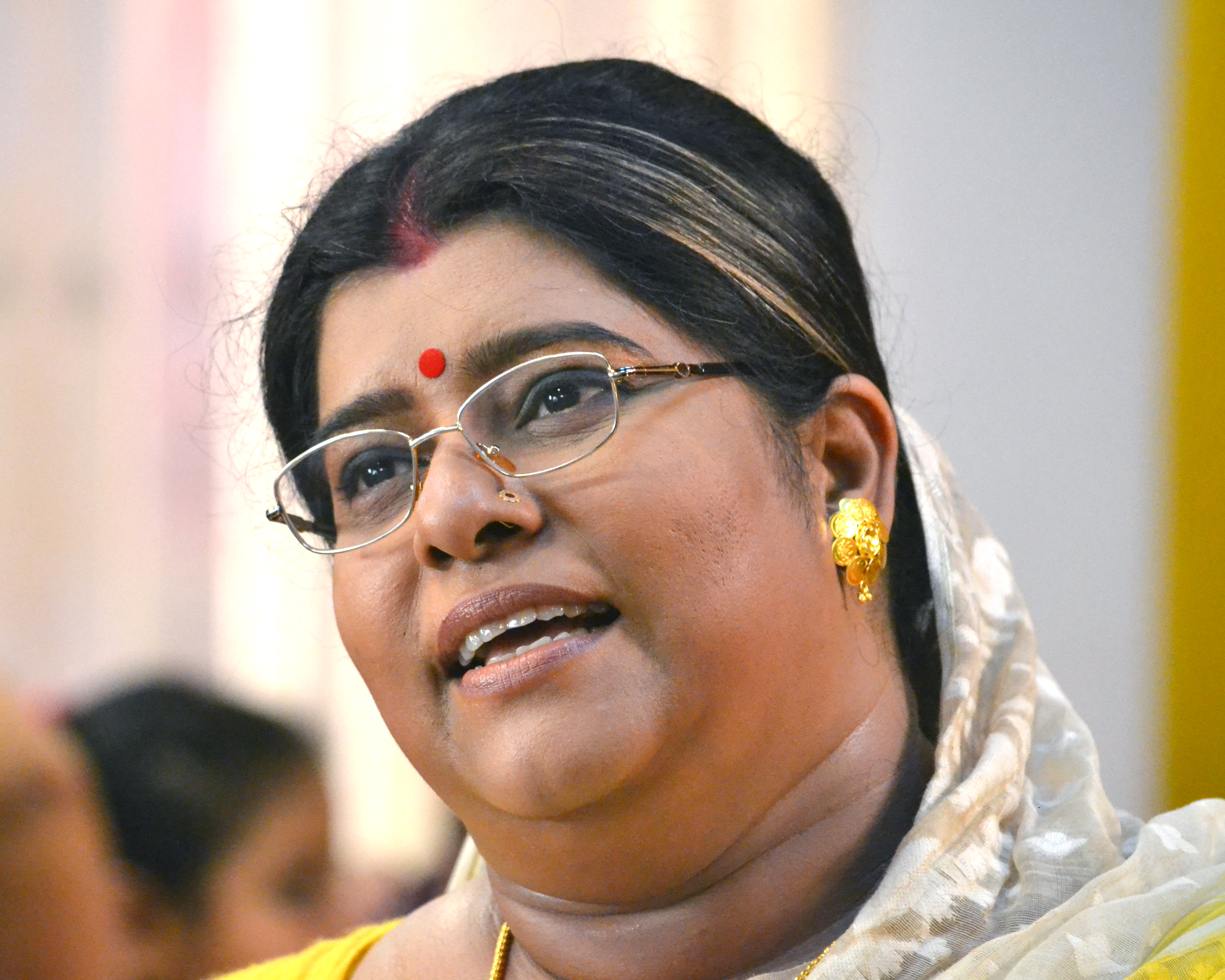
- Sinha in Bharat Lakshmi Studio
- Born: Kolkata
- Other name: Mishtu
- Occupations: Actress, film director
- Spouse: Sankha Sinha

Manasi Sinha is an Indian actress and director in Bengali language film and television. She is the daughter of Manideepa Roy, a noted actress of Bengali theatre.

== Filmography ==
=== As a director ===
Year	Film	Cast	Notes	Ref
2024	Eta Amader Golpo	Saswata Chatterjee, Aparajita Auddy	Directorial debut	
2024	5 no Swapnamoy Lane	Aparajita Auddy, Anwesha Hazra, Arjun Chakraborty, Soma Banerjee, Kharaj Mukherjee, Payel Mukherjee		
2027	Begni Ronger Alo	Sohini Sarkar, Anujoy Chattopadhyay		

=== As an actor ===
Year	Film	Role
2003	Alo	
2004	Rashta	
2005	Break Fail	
2007	Krishnakanter Will	
2009	Chha-e Chhuti	Kharaj's wife
2009	Lakshyabhed	
2009	Fantush	
2010	Ogo Bodhu Sundari	Mokkhoda
2010	Prem by Chance	
2011	Aami Montri Hobo	Jadu's wife
2011	Private Practice	Sankar's Mother
2012	Golemale Pirit Koro Na	Smritikona
2012	Goynar Baksho	Annapurna
2012	Abosheshey	Piyali
2012	Dutta Vs Dutta	Jethima
2012	Chhutir Phande	
2012	Ektuku Chhoan Lage	Malati
2012	Goray Gandogol	
2013	Sujon Bandhu Re	Lali Di
2013	Ebong Bhalobahsar Golpo	
2013	Chupi Chupi	
2014	Chotushkone	
2015	Shudhu Tomari Jonyo	Kangsho's Wife
2015	Jamai 420	Priyamvada Chowdhury
2016	Kelor Kirti	
2016	Power	Jeetu's Elder Sister
2017	Chal Kuntal	
2018	Kusumitar Gappo	Kusumita's Mother
2019	Teko	
2020	Nimki Fulki 2	Ranjan's mother
2020	Brahma Janen Gopon Kommoti	
2020	Cheeni	Misti Pishi
2022	Aparajito	Rama Devi
2022	Ogo Bideshini	
2023	Ektu Sore Bosun	
2025	Pataligunjer Putul Khela	
2026	Bhanupriya Bhooter Hotel	Bhanupriya / Smritikona

== Television ==
- Checkmate (Indian TV series)
- Maa
- Saat Pake Bandha (later replaced by Namita Chakraborty)
- Bodhu Kon Alo Laaglo Chokhe
- Agnipariksha
- Bhasha
- Raage Anuraage
- Goyenda Ginni
- Potol Kumar Gaanwala
- Bhootu
- I Laugh U
- Jai Kali Kalkattawali
- Ei Poth Jodi Na Sesh Hoy
- Kanyadaan (later replaced by Swagata Mukherjee)
- Ranga Bou
- Mittir Bari (later replaced by Soma Banerjee)

== Web series ==
Year	Web series	Role	Director	Platform	Notes	Ref.
2022–present	Indu	Annada Dasgupta	Sayantan Ghosal - Season 1; Abhimanyu Mukherjee - Season 2	Hoichoi	Season 1, 2	
2022–present	Sampurna	Sampurna's mother	Sayantan Ghosal	Hoichoi	Season 2	

== Awards ==
- Zee Bangla Gaurav Samman 2012- Best Supporting Actress as Rohini in Agnipariksha
- Zee Bangla Sonar Sansar 2015- Priyo Sashuri-Bouma Juti as Meera in Raage Anurage
- Zee Bangla Sonar Sansar 2015- Priyo Pishi as Meera in Raage Anurage
- Zee Bangla Sonar Sansar 2022- Best Supporting Actress as Mrinalini in Ei Poth Jodi Na Sesh Hoy
- 21st Tele Cine Awards 2024- Best Promising Director for Eta Amader Golpo
- FTPC INDIA BENGAL STAR ICON AWARDS-2024- Best Debutant Director for Eta Amader Golpo
- 5th WBFJA Award- Best Actor in a Comic Role in Brahma Janen Gopon Kommoti
