= Bigg Boss (Tamil TV series) season 6 =

Indian reality show season (2022)

Bigg Boss
- Season 6
- Bigg Boss Season 6
- Presented by: Kamal Haasan
- No. of days: 105
- No. of housemates: 21
- Winner: Mohamed Azeem
- Runner-up: Vikraman Radhakrishnan
- No. of episodes: 106

Release
- Original network: Star Vijay; Disney+ Hotstar
- Original release: 9 October 2022 – 22 January 2023

Season chronology
- ← Previous; Season 5 Next → Season 7

Bigg Boss 6 is the sixth season of the Tamil-Indian reality television series of Bigg Boss based on the Dutch series Big Brother and produced by Endemol Shine India (now merged with Banijay). The show launched on 9 October 2022 on Star Vijay along with a 24/7 Live stream on Disney+ Hotstar. Kamal Haasan returned as the host for the sixth time. Once again, Nippon Paint sponsored the sixth season. Mohamed Azeem was the winner of this season while Vikraman Radhakrishnan was the runner-up.

== Production ==
=== Eye logo ===
The eye logo was officially released on 3 September 2022. The logo of the season was shaped in an oval kind of manner with a full gold and orangy brush. However a round red circle in the middle of the eye symbolizes heated arguments and a tough challenge to take place in the season.

=== House ===
The House of this season had a "'Luxurious Mansion'" theme. The house was once again located in EVP Film City, Chennai for the seventh time, including Bigg Boss Ultimate (season 1) which was also located in EVP.

=== Teaser ===
The show organizers officially released the teaser on 5 September 2022 once again featuring actor Kamal Haasan as the host for the sixth time. The 2nd teaser was officially released on 10 September 2022. The third teaser was released on 27 September 2022, officially revealing the launch date of the season which was titled as the Grand Launch Night which launched on 9 October 2022.

=== Broadcast ===
On 30 September 2022, The makers of the show announced the show stands out for the fact that it will stream 24x7 live on Disney+ Hotstar and an hour-long episode every day on Star Vijay. The episodes will be first telecasted through 24 Hours Live Channel on a paid subscription to Disney+ Hotstar for only members who are subscribed and have a membership with Disney+ Hotstar. The 24 hour stream is not available on Saturday and Sunday due to weekend special episodes. The show will telecast live in Disney+ Hotstar. The one-hour episode will be telecast in Star Vijay Television.

== Housemate status ==
S. No.	Housemates	Day Entered	Day Exited	Status
1	Azeem	Day 1	Day 105	Winner
2	Vikraman	Day 1	Day 105	1st Runner-up
3	Shivin	Day 1	Day 105	2nd Runner-up
4	Nandhini	Day 7	Day 103	3rd Runner-up
5	Amudhavanan	Day 1	Day 103	Walked with ₹11.75L
6	Kathirravan	Day 1	Day 100	Walked with ₹3L
7	ADK	Day 1	Day 98	Evicted
8	Rachitha	Day 1	Day 91	Evicted
9	Manikandan	Day 1	Day 84	Evicted
10	Dhanalakshmi	Day 1	Day 77	Evicted
11	Janany	Day 1	Day 70	Evicted
12	Ayesha	Day 1	Day 63	Evicted
13	Ram	Day 1	Day 62	Evicted
14	Queency	Day 1	Day 56	Evicted
15	Robert	Day 1	Day 49	Evicted
16	Nivaashiyni	Day 1	Day 42	Evicted
17	Maheshwari	Day 1	Day 35	Evicted
18	Sheriina	Day 1	Day 28	Evicted
19	Asal	Day 1	Day 21	Evicted
20	Shanthi	Day 1	Day 14	Evicted
21	Muthu	Day 1	Day 13	Walked

== Housemates ==
The participants in the order of appearance and entered in house are:

=== Original entrants ===
==== Celebrities ====
- G. P. Muthu – Social media influencer and carpenter from Tuticorin district, Tamil Nadu.
- Asal Kolaar – Rapper known for his song Jorthaale and special collaboration music with rapper and songwriter OfRo.
- Mohamed Azeem – Television actor known for playing the lead role in the TV serials Pagal Nilavu, Kadaikutty Singam and Poove Unakkaga.
- Robert – Choreographer and actor. He has performed as a dancer in movies and has acted in a couple of films as well.
- Ayesha Zeenath – Television actress known for playing the titular role of Sathya in the TV serial Sathya as well as its sequel Sathya 2.
- Sheriina – Actress and Supermodel who is known for her role in the film Vinodhaya Sitham (2021).
- Manikandan Rajesh – Television actor. He is known for his appearance in the dating reality show Mr And Mrs Chinnathirai (season 3) which aired on Star Vijay in 2019, as well as the TV serials Sondha Bandham, Azhagu and Akka . He is the elder brother of film actress Aishwarya Rajesh.
- Rachitha Mahalakshmi – Television actress known for playing the lead role the TV serials Saravanan Meenatchi, Naam Iruvar Namakku Iruvar (season 2), Idhu Solla Marandha Kadhai and Ilavarasi.
- Ram Ramaswamy – Actor, Model.
- Aaryan Dinesh Kanagaratnam (ADK) – Sri Lankan Tamil rapper and record producer. He has worked in the Tamil and Telugu music industries as well and is known for his collaboration with A. R. Rahman.
- Janany Kunaseelan – Sri Lankan Tamil television anchor and actress. She appeared in Star Tamil TV as a television anchor for cooking shows and as an actress for comedy shows like Dak Dik Dos on IBC Tamil.
- Shanthi Arvind – Choreographer and television actress. She is known for her dance performance in the Tamil TV serial Metti Oli which aired from 2002 to 2005. She has also acted in TV serials such as Kula Deivam, Kannana Kanne, and Muthazhagu.
- Vikraman Radhakrishnan – Journalist, politician and television actor who is the official spokesperson of the Viduthalai Chiruthaigal Katchi (VCK) party and He is known for playing the lead role in the serial Vinnaithaandi Varuvaayaa.
- Amudhavanan – Comedian and actor. He is known for appearing in many stage shows and comedy reality shows on Star Vijay. He also appeared in films such as Tharai Thappattai (2016), Julieum 4 Perum (2017) and Billa Pandi (2018).
- Maheshwari Chanakyan – Actress and video jockey. Known for her role in her debut serial Puthu Kavithai (2013). She is also known for appearing in films such as Chennai 600028 II (2018), Writer (2021) and Vikram (2022).
- Kathirravan Kabilan – Video jockey and actor. Known for hosting numerous talk shows on Sun Music and Sun TV including Vanakkam Tamizha
- Queency Stanly – Television actress known for acting in the TV serial Anbe Vaa.
- Nivaashiyni Krishnan – Actress and entrepreneur from Singapore. She is of Indian descent with her roots from Paramakudi. She is known for her role in the Singaporean series,Vetri season 3.

==== General public (commoners) ====
- Dhanalakshmi – TikTok personality from Bhavani, Erode.
- Shivin Ganesan – A trans woman, IT professional from Thanjavur. A representative of the LGBTQ community.

=== Wildcard Entrant ===
- Myna Nandhini – Television actress and anchor. She is known for featuring in the serial Saravanan Meenatchi and movies such as Aranmanai 3 (2021) and Vikram (2022).

== Twists ==
=== Banana Bed punishment ===
The Banana Bed is a punishment that housemates faced upon their arrival into the house on the grand launch day. The four housemates who are being nominated as the least interactive housemate they will be forced to sleep in the banana bed as a punishment. The housemates who have the majority votes will be forced to face the punishment. These four housemates were also directly nominated for Week 2 eviction process. If housemates who are under the banana bed punishment and excel in tasks, they will be removed from the eviction list and be replaced by another co housemate of their choice.

Day(s)	Nominated Housemate	Votes received
Launch Day – Day 2	Vikraman	6
Launch Day – Day 2	Janany	7
Launch Day – Day 2	Nivaashiyni Krishnan	9
Launch Day – Day 2	Queency	5
Day 2 – Day 3	Vikraman	Not swapped
Day 2 – Day 3	Ayesha	Swapped by Janany
Day 2 – Day 3	Ram	Swapped by Nivaashiyni
Day 2 – Day 3	Azeem	Swapped by Queency
Day 4	Maheshwari	Swapped by Vikraman
Day 4	Dhanalakshmi	Swapped by Ayesha
Day 4	Ram	No swap
Day 4	Azeem	No swap
Day 4	Banana Bed Punishment Ends	

=== BB Club House ===
On Day 2, each housemate was put into clubs (groups). Each club were Vessels, Cleaning, Kitchen and Bathroom clubs. Each clubs need to complete the chores based on their group rules.

Club	Club leader	Club members
Kitchen	Shivin	Adk, Maheshwari, Shanthi, Vikraman
Vessels	Janany	Ayesha, Dhanalakshmi, Manikandan, Muthu
Bathroom	Amuthavanan	Nivaashiyni, Rachitha, Ram, Robert
Cleaning	Kathirravan	Asal, Azeem, Queency, Sheriina, Myna Nandhini

=== Finale week ===
For the first time in the history of Bigg Boss Tamil, Cash Prizes were offered twice in the name of Cash Bag & Cash Box, On day 100 Kathiravan walked with the Cash Bag (₹3 Lakhs) & on day 103 Amudhavanan walked with the Cash Box (₹11.75 Lakhs) . On day 103, Myna Nandhini was evicted during mid-week eviction process. Instead of the usual four to five finalists followed in the previous seasons, this season had only 3 Finalists on Day 105 replicating the original Big Brother format.

=== Jail Punishment ===
	Week 1	Week 2	Week 3	Week 4	Week 5	Week 6	Week 7	Week 8-15
Punishment by	Jail Not Introduced	Everyone	Everyone	Everyone	Jail Cancelled	Everyone	Everyone	Jail Cancelled
Punishment given to	Jail Not Introduced	Ram	Azeem	Ram	Jail Cancelled	Robert	Robert	Jail Cancelled
Punishment given to	Jail Not Introduced	Ram	Azeem	Amudhavanan (Punished by BIGG BOSS)	Jail Cancelled	Robert	Robert	Jail Cancelled
Punishment given to	Jail Not Introduced	Janany	Shivin	Vikraman	Jail Cancelled	Rachitha	Queency	Jail Cancelled
Reason	Jail Not Introduced	Ranked bottom 2 in ranking task	Worst performers of the week	Worst performers of the week	Jail Cancelled	Worst performers of the week	Worst performers of the week	Jail Cancelled

== Special episodes ==
Week(s)	Title	Date	Guest(s)	Notes
15	Bigg Boss 6 – Pongal Special	16 January 2023	Ex/Evicted housemates return to celebrate	To celebrate the festival with the housemates; Three-hour episode

== Guest appearance ==
Week(s)	Day(s)	Guest(s)	Purpose of Visits
Week 1	Grand Launch	Priyanka Deshpande, Niroop Nandakumar, Aishwarya Dutta, Yashika Anand, Suresh Chakravarthy, Ramya Pandian, Abhirami Venkatachalam, Rio Raj and Maria Juliana	To launch the season.
Week 1	Grand Launch	Aishwarya Rajesh	To support Manikandan Rajesh via video call.
Week 9	Day 60	Anjali, Santhosh Prathap and Rajmohan Arumugam	To promote Fall, a web series on Disney+ Hotstar.
Week 12	Day 79	Family members of Shivin, Myna Nandhini and Rachitha	For freeze task.
Week 12	Day 80	Family members of ADK, Manikandan, Amudhavanan	For freeze task.
Week 12	Day 81	Family members of Vikraman, Kathirravan and Azeem	For freeze task.
Week 14 - 15	Day 92	Suresh Chakravarthy and Ahmed Meeran	For weekly task.
Week 14 - 15	Day 93	VJ Parvathy and VJ Shobana	For weekly task.
Week 14 - 15	Day 94-101; Day 94-104	Robert, G P Muthu . Asal, Shanthi, (Ex-contestants of this season)	For Pongal Celebrations.
Week 14 - 15	Day 95-101; Day 95-102; Day 95-104	Dhanalakshmi, Manikandan. Queency, Nivaashiyni (Ex-contestants of this season)	For Pongal Celebrations.
Week 14 - 15	Day 96-102; Day 96-104	Sheriina, Maheshwari Chanakyan; Ram(Ex-contestants of this season)	For Pongal Celebrations.
Week 14 - 15	Day 99	Priyanka Deshpande and Ma Ka Pa Anand	For Pongal Celebrations.
Week 14 - 15	Day 99	Super Singer 9 contestants	For Pongal Celebrations.
Week 14 - 15	Day 99	Dhivyadharshini	For Pongal Celebrations.
Week 14 - 15	Day 99	Gomathi Priya and Vetri Vasanth	For Pongal Celebrations.
Week 14 - 15	Day 99	Singapore Deepan, Otteri, Silmisham Siva, Raveena Daha and Monisha	For Pongal Celebrations.
Week 14 - 15	Day 99	Saravanan, Sujatha, Lakshmipriya, Prathiba, Aadhirai and Kaavya	For Pongal Celebrations.
Week 14 - 15	Day 100-104	Rachitha Mahalakshmi, Ayesha Zeenath (Ex-contestants of this season)	For reunion with housemates
Week 14 - 15	Day 104	Kavin, Aparna Das	For promoting their film "Dada"
Week 14 - 15	Day 105	Band members	For entertaining three finalists
Week 14 - 15	Day 105	Kamal Hassan	For introducing title winner's trophy and giving away special gifts to finalists.

== Weekly summary ==
Week 1	Entrances	Day 1: Muthu, Asal, Shivin, Azeem, Robert, Ayesha, Sheriina, Manikandan, Rachitha, Ram, Adk, Janany, Shanthi, Vikraman, Amudhavanan, Maheshwari, Kathirravan, Queency, Nivaashyni Krishnan and Dhanalakshmi entered the Bigg Boss house. Day 7: Myna entered the house as a Wildcard Entrant.
Week 1	Twists	On the Grand Launch day, all the housemates were assigned with a task and need to nominate 4 least interactive housemates a poun their arrival into the house. All the housemates made a decision and nominated Janany, Vikraman, Queency and Nivaashini as the least interactive housemates and as a punishment they were forced to sleep in the garden area in the banana peel bed for a whole night.; Bigg Boss broke its 5-year ritual of team luxury budget task and points and making the luxury budget task and points for individual housemates only. And no group sharing.
Week 1	Captaincy Task	None
Week 1	House Captain	None
Week 1	Nominations	None
Week 1	Luxury Budget Task	Enge Buzzer Ange Pressure!: Each housemate had to play this task individually without any help from their co-housemates. The housemate that stops the buzzers around the house the quickest will receive luxury budget points for themselves only.: Maheshwari won 200 points.; Amudhavanan won 200 points.; Janany won 200 points.; Ayesha won 200 points.; Nivaashiyni Krishnan won 200 points.; Amudhavanan won another 200 points.; Shivin won 200 points.; Adk won 200 points.
Week 1	Weekly Task	Housemates needed to be assigned to a group for house chores and each housemate picked their house chores group in which they will be assigned particular duties based on the group they have selected. Each group will have a group leader as well. Kitchen Group: Shanthi, Shivin (Leader), Adk, Vikraman, Maheshwari; Bathroom Group: Rachitha, Robert, Amuthavanan (Leader), Ram, Nivaashini; Vessel Group: Dhanalakshmi, Manikandan, Ayesha, Janany (Leader), Muthu; Cleaning Group: Queency, Kathirravan(Leader), Azeem, Sheriina, Asal
Week 1	Daily Tasks	Enna Satham Intha Neram: From each club, 2 Members need to scream through the Bigg Boss mic. The member that screams the loudest and gets the highest amount of decibel will receive points and advantages for their club.: Kitchen Club Members; Vikraman – 1.2 Decibel; Shanthi – 1.0 Decibel; Bathroom Club Members; Robert – 1.2 Decibel; Rachitha – 2.3 Decibel (Winner); Vessel Club Members; Muthu – 1.5 Decibel (Winner); Dhanalakshmi – 1.3 Decibel; Cleaning Club Members; Asal – 0.2 Decibel; Sheriina – 1.4 Decibel; Muthu won the task after scoring a 1.5 decibel on the task and won Star points for his club.; Rachitha won the task after scoring a 2.3 decibel on the task and won Star points for her club.; Park the Ball: One member from each club will need to participate in this task, The task is to properly place the ball on a rolling table without making it fall of the edges of the board. The club that properly places the ball will win points for their club.: Kitchen Club; Adk; Vessels Club; Manikanda (Winner); Cleaning Club; Kathirravan; Bathroom Club; Amudhavanan; Manikandan won the task and won points for the Vessels Club.
Week 1	Banana Bed punishment	Janany, Queency, Vikraman and Nivaashini were nominated to be in the banana bed as a punishment for their lack of effort.
Week 1	Jail	None
Week 1	Saved contestants	All saved, Eviction cancelled
Week 1	Exits	None
Week 2	Entrances	None
Week 2	Captaincy Task	GP Muthu, Shanthi Arvind and Janany Kunaseelan participated in the captaincy task. The task was the nominees were required to hold on to a massive clock and try not to lose grip whenever it spins. The last person remaining in the task will be declared house captain for week 2.
Week 2	Captaincy Task	Winner– GP Muthu
Week 2	Captaincy Task	Failed– Janany Kunaseelan
Week 2	Captaincy Task	Failed– Shanthi Arvind
Week 2	House Captain	GP Muthu
Week 2	Nominations	Ayesha, Azeem, Dhanalakshmi, Maheshwari, Nivaashini, Queency, Rachitha, Ram, Shanthi, Sheriina, Shivin and Vikraman were nominated for Week 2 nominations.
Week 2	Luxury Budget Task	Dance Marathon: Each housemate will compete against an opposing housemate in a dance marathon. The housemate who dances longer and better than their opponent housemate will win luxury budget points.: Sherrina (Winner) VS Azeem; Kathirravan VS Vikraman (Winner); Adk VS Muthu (Winner); Asal (Winner) VS Ram; Nivaashini VS Amudhavanan (Winner); Queency (Winner) VS Ayesha; Dhanalakshmi (Winner) VS Manikandan; Robert (Winner) VS Shanthi; Maheshwari VS Shivin (Winner); Rachitha (Winner) VS Janany; Myna is a spectator
Week 2	Weekly Tasks	Kathai Solum Neram: Housemates will be given 1 minute to complete their life story about their hardships and good moments in life. 3 buzzers will be kept and if any three housemates press the buzzer within the 1 minute time, housemates will not be able to complete their story. 8 housemates can be given a nomination free pass for which housemate that completes their life story. The housemate who presses the buzzer the maximum number of times will be directly nominated for eviction process.: Since Amudhavanan, Dhanalakshmi, Kathirravan, Manikandan, Myna, Nivaashini, Robert and Shivin were the eight contestant who completed their story, they were safe from Week 3 nomination process.; Ranking task: Each housemate will need to discuss among themselves and rank 13 housemates (not the housemates who are saved from Kathai Solum Neram task) and be ranked from number 1 being the best all the way to number 13 being the worst player. The top 3 housemates will be directly nominated for captaincy and the 2 worst (ranked 12th and 13th) will be sent to the jail.: Rank / Contestants; 1 / Maheswari; 2 / Shanthi; 3 / Adk; 4 / Asal; 5 / Queency; 6 / Rachitha; 7 / Sheriina; 8 / Vikraman; 9 / Ayesha; 10 / Azeem; 11 / Muthu; 12 / Ram (jail); 13 / Janany (jail); Maheshwari, Shanthi and Adk were directly nominated for week 3 captaincy.; Ram and Janany were sent to jail after receiving bottom 2 ranks.
Week 2	Jail	Janany and Ram were sent to the jail.
Week 2	Saved contestants(Saving Orders)	Azeem, Ayesha, Rachitha, Shivin, Vikraman, Maheshwari, Nivaashini, Queency, Dhanalakshmi, Ram and Sherina were saved after facing public voting.
Week 2	Exits	On Day 13, GP Muthu walked out of the house due to his son's poor health.; On Day 14, Shanthi Arvind was evicted after facing public votes.
Week 3	Entrances	None
Week 3	Captaincy Task|	* Aaryan Dinesh Kanagaratnam, Maheshwari Chanakyan and Queency Stanly participated in the captaincy task. Since the captaincy task took place on Deepavali day the task was to create a unique Rangoli. And the nominee with the best rangoli according to the housemates vote and whoever receives the majority vote will win captaincy.
Week 3	Captaincy Task|	Winner– Queency Stanly
Week 3	Captaincy Task|	Failed– Maheswari Chanakyan
Week 3	Captaincy Task|	Failed– Aaryan Dinesh Kanagaratnam
Week 3	House Captain	Queency Stanly
Week 3	Nominations	Adk, Asal, Ayesha, Azeem, Maheshwari, Janany and Rachitha were nominated for Week 3 nominations.
Week 3	Luxury Budget Task	80 second task: Each housemate will eat an uncommon item within the span of 80 seconds. If they do not manage to complete the task within 80 seconds they will not receive any luxury budget points.: Manikandan won 200 points.; Janany won 200 points.; Rachita won 200 points.; Manikanda won 200 points.; Dhanalakshmi won 200 points.; Kathiravan won 200 points.
Week 3	Weekly Task	Neeyum Bommai Naanum Bommai: Housemates will need to get a doll with another housemates name on it and run in time to the doll house and place the doll in the box, However the last doll that makes it to the house and doesn't receive a box will be out, which means that the name of the housemate on the last doll will be out of the task. The last person to still have their doll will win the task. Top 3 Amudhavanan Robert Ram: Since Amudhavanan, Robert and Ram were the last three contestant to keep their doll safe, they were safe from Week 4 nomination process.
Week 3	Jail	Azeem and Shivin were sent to the jail.
Week 3	Saved contestants	Adk, Ayesha, Azeem, Maheshwari, Janany and Rachitha were saved after facing the public vote.
Week 3	Exits	On Day 21, Asal Kolaar was evicted after facing public votes.
Week 4	Entrances	None
Week 4	Captaincy Task	Manikandan Rajesh, Nivaashini Saravanan and Queency Stanly participated in the captaincy task. The task was the nominees were required to fill up a tube with water, they will need to collect water from one end of the house and overcome a obstacle and try to pour as much of water they can into the tube, the housemate who gets their tube filled first will win the captaincy task and serve as the 4th week captain.
Week 4	Captaincy Task	Winner– Manikandan Rajesh
Week 4	Captaincy Task	Failed– Nivaashiyni
Week 4	Captaincy Task	Failed– Queency Stanly
Week 4	House Captain	Manikandan Rajesh
Week 4	Nominations	Ayesha, Azeem, Kathirravan, Sheriina and Vikraman were nominated for Week 4 nominations.
Week 4	Luxury Budget Task	This week Luxury Budget Task will be played as 2 teams: Water handball : The winning team should secure maximum goals to fetch the luxury points.; Thallu Mullu : The winning team should secure more points than the other team by showing their physical fitness to fetch the luxury points.
Week 4	Weekly Task	Indha TV vs Andha TV: Housemates are put into groups and will be part of a fictional television network in the Bigg Boss house. Each TV group will need to come up with a timetable of fiction television programs they will need to air in their TV network. The television network that receives the most TRP ratings at the end of the week will win the luxury budget task.
Week 4	Jail	Vikraman, Amudhavanan and Ram were sent to the jail.
Week 4	Saved contestants	Ayesha, Azeem, Kathirravan and Vikraman were saved after facing the public vote.
Week 4	Exits	On Day 28, Sherina Sam was evicted after facing public votes.
Week 5	Entrances	None
Week 5	Captaincy Task	Amudhavanan, Myna Nandhini and Robert participated in the captaincy task. In this week task (Tibble Tobble) the nominees were allowed to use a skyboat with both of their legs tied to it. The one who stays longer in the skyboat without falling down will win this task and serve as the captain for 5th week.
Week 5	Captaincy Task	Winner– Myna Nandhini
Week 5	Captaincy Task	Failed– Amudhavanan
Week 5	Captaincy Task	Failed– Robert
Week 5	House Captain	Myna Nandhini
Week 5	Nominations	Adk, Ayesha, Azeem, Dhanalakshmi, Maheshwari, Ram and Vikraman were nominated for Week 5 nominations.
Week 5	Weekly Task	Sweet Factory: Housemates will be divided into 2 groups and will form 2 mini groups selling sweets and desserts. Each group will need to submit their sweets to the judges (bosses) to get their approval if the dessert should be sold. If the judges (Quality Checkers) approve they will get a luxury budget point. While other remaining housemates will be known as the buyers (Customers) who buy the sweets that are approved by the judges. Kanna Laddu Thinna Aasaya Group Adai Thean Adai Group (WON): Since Amudhavanan and Manikandan where selected as best performers of the week. Dhanalakshmi's team won the Sweet Factory task and as a leader she was saved from nomination, however she got the option to select the best player in her team and she selected Rachitha.; Hence Amudhavanan, Dhanalakshmi, Manikandan and Rachitha is also saved from Week 6 nomination.
Week 5	Luxury Budget Task	Truth or Dare: Each housemate will roll a dice with truth and dare on each side. If the housemate's dice lands on a dare they will be dared by Bigg Boss to fully successfully complete the dare, however if they refuse to complete the dare they will be punished. If the dice lands on a truth side, the housemate will need to answer the question honestly given by Bigg Boss in the confession room.: Maheshwari won 200 points.; Amudhavanan won 200 points.; Manikandan won 200 points.; Azeem won 200 points.; Nivaashiyni won 200 points.; Ram won 200 points.; Queency won 200 points.
Week 5	Jail	None
Week 5	Saved contestants	Adk, Ayesha, Azeem, Dhanalakshmi, Ram and Vikraman were saved after facing the public vote.
Week 5	Exits	On Day 35, Maheshwari Chanakyan was evicted after facing public votes.
Week 6	Entrances	None
Week 6	Captaincy Task	* Amudhavanan, Manikandan, Rachitha and Vikraman participated in the captaincy task. In this week task, the nominees will stand on a small circle platform and push other nominees with the help of the boxing stick, out of the circle. The last nominee to remain in the circle platform will win captaincy.
Week 6	Captaincy Task	Winner– Manikandan Rajesh
Week 6	Captaincy Task	Failed– Amudhavanan
Week 6	Captaincy Task	Failed– Rachitha Mahalakshmi
Week 6	Captaincy Task	Failed– Vikraman Radhakrishnan
Week 6	House Captain	Manikandan Rajesh
Week 6	Nominations	Ayesha, Azeem, Dhanalakshmi, Janany, Kathirravan, Nivaashini, Queency and Robert were nominated for Week 6 nominations.
Week 6	Sponsor's Task (Day 36)	Nippon paint atom 2 in 1 task: Housemates will be divided into 3 teams. The task consists of two rounds.: Round 1- Paint the wall: It requires 1 member from all the 3 teams. The members have to paint the walls according to the instructions given in the queue card read by the judge. The top 2 teams selected by the judge advances to the second round.; Round 2- Ullae veliye: The 2 selected teams, should listen to instructions from the judge. When he says ULLAE, they should stand on blue carpet, for VELIYE, they should stand on red carpet. in each round 1 member who doesn't get the carpet will be eliminated. The last member remaining in the carpet will be the winner of the round.; Judge: Azeem; Myna team : Myna, Robert, Manikandan, Adk, Amuthavanan. (Won the final round); Ayesha team: Ayesha, Nivaashini, Ram, kathiravan, Dhanalakshmi.; Shivin team: Shivin, Vikraman, Rachitha, Queency, Janany. (Lost in 1st round)
Week 6	Luxury Budget Task	Roast Challenge: Each housemate will need to roast an opposing housemate in any sorts of way. The housemate who wins the roast according to BIGG BOSS will win 400 luxury budget points.: Amudhavanan won 400 points.; Kathiravan won 400 points.; Ayesha won 400 points.; Janany won 400 points.; Rachitha won 400 points.; Myna won 400 points.; Vikraman won 400 points.; Dhanalakshmi won 400 points.
Week 6	Weekly Task	RAJA PARAMBARAI ARUNGACHIYAGAM (BIG BOSS ROYAL MUSEUM): Housemates will be divided into three groups one being the Royal family, Museum guards and House servants. Royal Family: Crown of King and Queen: Role / Housemate; King / Robert; Queen / Rachitha; Prince / Manikandan; Princess / Janany; Raja Guru / Vikraman; Thalapathy / Azeem; Museum Guards: Take care of the royal family.: Role / Housemate; Leader of guards / Adk; Supervisor (who is night blinded) / Ram; Guard-1: Doesn't know anything about the museum and just says stories / Dhanalakshmi; Guard-2: Sleeps while standing or talking / Ayesha; Guard 3 / Queency; Guard 4 / Nivaashini; House Servants: Take care of the household works and entertains the royal family.: Role / Housemate; House Servant 1 / Shivin; House Servant 2 / Kathirravan; House Servant 3 / Amudhavanan; House Servant 4 (Hearing impaired) / Myna
Week 6	Jail	Robert and Rachitha were sent to the jail.
Week 6	Saved contestants	Ayesha, Azeem, Dhanalakshmi, Janany, Kathirravan, Queency and Robert were saved after facing the public vote.
Week 6	Exits	On Day 42, Nivaashini Saravanan was evicted after facing public votes.
Week 7	Entrances	None
Week 7	Captaincy Task	Myna Nandhini, Dhanalakshmi and Kathirravan Kabilan participated in the captaincy task.; Enga Area Ulla Varathey: In this week task, Each contestant have to safeguard their poles by defending the ball which is forwarded by the volunteers of other competitors. Each contestant can select maximum 2 volunteers, the one who misses to defend the goal will be eliminated and the last one to safeguard their pole safely will be the captain of the house.
Week 7	Captaincy Task	Winner– Myna Nandhini
Week 7	Captaincy Task	Failed– Dhanalakshmi
Week 7	Captaincy Task	Failed– Kathirravan Kabilan
Week 7	House Captain	Myna Nandhini
Week 7	Nominations	Amudhavanan, Azeem, Dhanalakshmi, Kathirravan, Manikandan, Ram and Robert were nominated for Week 7 nominations.
Week 7	Luxury Budget Task	SPIN BOARD TASK: A spin board will be set up in the garden area. On hearing the buzzer, the first 2 persons reaching it will be allowed to play. One will stand on the rotating spin board and the next person will handle the wheel rotating the spin board. The person on the board need to complete the entire time duration standing on it to achieve 400 luxury budget points. If the person falls or asks to stop rotating the board, the housemate handling the wheel will get 400 luxury points.: Kathiravan won 400 points.; Myna won 400 points.; Shivin won 400 points.; Robert won 400 points.; Amudhavanan won 400 points.; Manikandan won 400 points.; Dhanalakshmi won 400 points.
Week 7	Weekly Task	BB COURTROOM: Housemates can register their cases before the front door camera without the knowledge of others. BB chamber will be selecting the cases for discussion in the courtroom. The petitioner and the respondent can select their own lawyers and discuss the case before the judge(selected by the housemates) in the courtroom. The judge will finally announce the results of the petition. Other housemates will act as jury.
Week 7	Sponsor's Task (Day 47)	Preethi appliances 60-90 task: Housemates will be divided into 2 teams of 7 under Ayesha and Azeem. Every housemate from both the teams will be required to complete the given grinding task using Preethi mixer and present it on the table. The judge will select the best team by comparing the final output and presentation skills and announce the winner.: Judge: Shivin.; Azeem team (BLUE): Azeem, Janany, Rachitha, Robert, Amudhavanan, Vikraman and Manikandan. (WON); Ayesha team (RED): Ayesha, Kathiravan, Ram, Myna, Adk, Queency and Dhanalakshmi.
Week 7	Jail	Robert and Queency were sent to the jail.
Week 7	Saved contestants	Amudhavanan, Azeem, Dhanalakshmi, Kathirravan, Manikandan and Ram were saved after facing the public vote.
Week 7	Exits	On Day 49, Robert Raj was evicted after facing public votes.
Week 8	Entrances	None
Week 8	Captaincy Task	Azeem, Shivin and Vikraman participated in the captaincy task. In this task, A coder is arranged in the garden area to set up the word "CAPTAIN" for each housemate separately . Each letter will be thrown as a ball from the pipe above. The housemate who first assembles the word, will win the captaincy task and serves as the captain of this week.
Week 8	Captaincy Task	Winner– Azeem
Week 8	Captaincy Task	Failed– Shivin
Week 8	Captaincy Task	Failed– Vikraman
Week 8	House Captain	Azeem
Week 8	Nominations	Dhanalakshmi, Janany, Kathirravan, Myna, Queency and Rachitha were nominated for Week 8 nominations.
Week 8	Luxury Budget Task	LOCK & KEY CHALLENGE: In this task, each housemate will be supplied with 2 locks to lock the other housemates and also a key to save the previously locked housemate. The decision to free the housemate will be optional. The one who wins the task finally without any locks, acquires the luxury budget points.: Manikandan won the task and won 4000 luxury points.
Week 8	Weekly Task	BOGABIZZAVUM ALIENGALUM: In this task, the housemates will be divided into 2 groups of 7. (Aliens & Tribals); TRIBALS: These people worship bogabizza as their god, whenever it feels hungry, tribals have to pick a flower from the small pond and place it in his mouth, Bogabizza then gives them precious gems & sand. Housemates then use the gems & sand to make the miracle stone with their name stamp and safeguard them.; Tribal group: Azeem, Vikraman, Myna, Adk, Kathiravan, Ram & Shivin.; ALIENS: These people from different land failing to capture the miracle stone from tribals, they occupied the pond completely.; Aliens group: Manikandan, Dhanalakshmi, Queency, Amudavanan, Ayesha, Rachitha, Janany.; THE TASK-TRIBALS: Whenever bogabizza hungry buzzer rings, tribals need to enter the alien land to steal flowers without getting caught. If they get caught, they will be placed in reactor chair, should not showcase their emotions . If they win they will get flowers, if they lose they have to be servants to the aliens.; THE TASK-ALIENS: Whenever their strength reduces there will be buzzer warning so they have to enter the tribal land to steal Miracle stone without getting caught. If they get caught, they will be placed in a reactor chair, should not showcase their emotions. If they win they will get stones, if they loss they will lose their alien power and have to a tribal.; Dhanalakshmi and Rachitha had a lot of stone from their team respectively and were saved from Week 9 Nominations.
Week 8	Sponsor's Task (Day 54)	Nexa Zig Zag puzzle task: Housemates will be divided into 3 teams of 4. After the buzzer, 1st person from every team have to take the bunch of keys and try opening the nexa zigzag box. The 2nd person should place the puzzles on the magnetic board, then the last 2 persons should solve the puzzle by rearranging them. First team to complete the task will be the winner.: Dhanalakshmi team: Dhanalakshmi, Amudhavanan, Janany & Queency; Rachitha team: Rachitha, Vikraman, shivin & Ram.; Manikandan team : Manikandan, Azeem, Adk & kathiravan. (WON); Judges: Myna & Ayesha.
Week 8	Worst Performers	Azeem and Myna were given punishment.
Week 8	Saved contestants	Dhanalakshmi, Janany, Kathirravan, Myna and Rachitha were saved after facing the public vote.
Week 8	Exits	On Day 56, Queency Stanly was evicted after facing public votes.
Week 9	Entrances	None
Week 9	Captaincy Task	Dhanalakshmi, Manikandan and Shivin participated in the captaincy task. In this week task, housemates have to stand on the spring platform set up in the garden area & they are provided with 2 ropes with a knot. Housemates are allowed to hold only one rope and they should try to remove the knots of other competitors without falling down from the platform. At last, the one who safeguards their rope's knot will be the winner.
Week 9	Captaincy Task	Winner– Manikandan
Week 9	Captaincy Task	Failed– Dhanalakshmi
Week 9	Captaincy Task	Failed– Shivin
Week 9	House Captain	Manikandan
Week 9	Nominations	Adk, Ayesha, Azeem, Janany, Kathirravan and Ram were nominated for Week 9 nominations.
Week 9	Luxury Budget Task	KANNAMPOCHI RAE RAE: In this task, the housemate who is near to the task camera when the buzzer rings, have to close their eyes for 20 seconds while others hide themselves. After the completion of 20 seconds, they have to find 6 or more housemates within 60 seconds to win 200 luxury budget points.: Janany won 200 points.; Myna won 200 points.; Rachitha won 200 points.; Amudhavanan won 200 points.; Manikandan won 200 points.; Shivin won 200 points.; Ayesha won 200 points.; Kathirravan won 200 points.
Week 9	Weekly Task	TWINKLE TWINKLE PERIYA STAR: In this task, each housemate will be a given a film based character. Throughout the week they have to live the character, entertain the audience and hence receive money from other characters.; A buzzer will be set up in the living area & big boss currency will be given to all housemates.; The one who presses the buzzer when red light blinks, should nominate a character to perform on the stage and after the performance prizes will be given.; The one who presses the buzzer when blue light blinks, should challenge another character on the stage and both will compete on each other based on a given situation.; At the end of the week, the housemate with highest money will be the Winner.; Amudhavanan had the highest money and became the Winner; HOUSEMATE / FICTIONAL CHARACTER / REAL NAME/ CHARACTER; Adk / Bongarandha / Nithyanandha; Myna / Poonai Sekhar / Naai Sekhar (Vadivelu); Shivin / Modern Mohini / Jagan Mohini; Dhanalakshmi / Mosamani / Nesamani (Vadivelu); Kathiravan / Cycle Jackson / Michael Jackson; Ayesha / Mad Madhan / Manmadhan (STR); Vikraman / Kanniyan / Anniyan (Vikram); Janany / Araathu Vanathi / Araathu Aanandhi( Sai Pallavi); Ram / Thuguvaran / Raghuvaran; Azeem / Vakeel Ganeshan / Sivaji Ganeshan; Amudhavanan / MR Vedha / MR Radha; Manikandan / Valaiah / Balaiah; Rachitha / Geetha Devi / Saroja Devi
Week 9	Worst Performers	Vikraman and Shivin were given punishment.
Week 9	Saved contestants	Adk, Azeem, Janany and Kathirravan were saved after facing the public vote.
Week 9	Exits	On Day 62, Ram Ramaswamy was evicted after facing public votes.; On Day 63, Ayesha Zenath was evicted after facing public votes.
Week 10	Entrances	None
Week 10	Captaincy Task	Amudhavanan, Myna and Rachitha participated in the captaincy task. In this week task, Three set of Chairs with attached beakers were placed in the garden area. The contestants have to fill the beaker with water from the balloon pool by absorbing the water and sitting on the chair. The contestant who fills the beaker first will win the captaincy task and serves as the captain of this week.
Week 10	Captaincy Task	Winner– Myna
Week 10	Captaincy Task	Failed– Rachitha
Week 10	Captaincy Task	Failed– Amudhavanan
Week 10	House Captain	Myna
Week 10	Nominations	Adk, Azeem, Janany, Manikandan, Rachitha and Vikraman were nominated for Week 10 nominations.
Week 10	Luxury Budget Task	In this week task, Whenever the buzzer rings, housemates should answer 4 questions (age 10 IQ standard) within 90 seconds asked by BIGBOSS in the confession room . Each correctly answered question carries 50 luxury budget points.: Myna won 50 points.; Dhanalakshmi won 50 points.; Vikraman won 200 points.; Azeem won 50 points.; Amudhavanan won 100 points.; Rachitha won 100 points.; Shivin won 150 points.; Adk won 100 points.; Janany won 50 points.
Week 10	Weekly Task	SHORTCUT : In this task, Housemates will be divided into 4 Angels ( Who live in Heaven) & 7 Demons (Who live in Hell) .; DEMONS- They will be locked in a cage & whenever opened they should complete the task given by angels. Once Successfully completed, they will be sent to cage. If they fail the task, they will be punished.; Demons can enter the heaven and become an angel in 2 ways. One is during the swapping time an angel and a demon can be swapped by the decision of angels. The second way is through the tunnel shortcut . If a demon successfully crossed the shortcut and enters the heaven, an angel should be swapped again. If a demon gets caught in the tunnel they will be punished by angels.; ANGELS- They should safeguard the heaven from demons entry and also perform all the household works.; Since Adk, Amudhavanan, Janany and Manikandan managed to secure their position as angels, hence they were granted the power to avoid getting nominated for Week 11 nomination process.
Week 10	Sponsor's Task (Day 64)	Finolex Pipes Fitting Task: Housemates will be divided into 3 teams of 3 each . Each team is given with a finolex board containing incomplete pipe fittings. Members from each team should assemble the given pieces/joints in the board one after the other (RELAY). The team which assembles the complete pipe fittings first with full accuracy will be the winner of this task.: Rachitha team: Rachitha, Shivin & Amudhavanan. (WON); Myna team: Myna, Azeem & Dinesh.; Dhanalakshmi team: Dhanalakshmi, Vikraman & Janany; Judges: Manikandan & Kathiravan.
Week 10	Sponsor's Task (Day 68)	Nippon paint shooting task: Housemates will be divided into 2 teams of 5 each. Two balloon walls of yellow & Blue will be set up in the garden area with red and silver balloons intermittently. Team members have to shoot red balloons in their walls with the help of Nippon gun. From 6 bullets from the gun, 2 bullets have to be shot while standing, 2 in squat position & last 2 in ground position. 5 points for shooting red balloon, -2 points for silver balloon and no points for shooting blue/yellow balloons. The team with highest points wins the game.: Judge: Shivin.; Rachitha team: Rachitha , Myna, Kathiravan, ADK & Amudhavan.; Janany team: Janany, Dhana Lakshmi, Manikandan, Vikraman & Azeem. (WON)
Week 10	Worst Performers	Janany and Rachitha were given punishment.
Week 10	Saved contestants	Adk, Azeem, Manikandan, Rachitha and Vikraman were saved after facing the public vote.
Week 10	Exits	On Day 70, Janany Kunaseelan was evicted after facing public votes.
Week 11	Entrances	None
Week 11	Captaincy Task	Manikandan, ADK & Amudhavanan participated in the captaincy task. In this week task, Every contestant has 2 supporters which will be decided by non contender. Each team will send a person in every round, the game is to put a basket on other 2 person's head to eliminate them from the competition. At the end of 3 rounds, the team with more participants wins and the leader will be the captain of this week.
Week 11	Captaincy Task	Winner– Manikandan
Week 11	Captaincy Task	Failed– Adk
Week 11	Captaincy Task	Failed– Amudhavanan
Week 11	House Captain	Manikandan
Week 11	Nominations	Azeem, Dhanalakshmi, Kathirravan, Myna, Rachitha, Shivin and Vikraman were nominated for Week 11 nominations.
Week 11	Luxury Budget Task	1-1 person task: This game will be played in pairs.; On hearing the buzzer, they have to wear the task dress and assemble inside the circle ( Divided into 5,10,20 and 50 points); One person have to drag the other person out of the circle near the point they needs.
Week 11	Weekly Task	Kana kaanum kaalangal: Big Boss house was recreated as a School & College and the housemates assumed the role of characters working in a typical school/college.; Food must be prepared by the teachers and the rest of the housemates will assume the role of students.; The best performing teacher & 2 students will assume the role of teachers on the next day.; / TASK / TEACHERS; Day 72 / Primary school / Azeem, Amudhavanan & Vikraman; Day 73 / High school / Myna, Kathiravan & Amudhavanan; Day 74 / Arts & Science college / Manikandan, Amudhavanan & Vikraman.; Ranking task: Each housemate will need to discuss among themselves and be ranked from number 1 being the best all the way to number 10 being the worst player based on their performance in 75 days. The top 3 housemates will be directly nominated for captaincy and the 2 worst (ranked 9th and 10th) will be serving as robots to top 2 people.: Rank / Housemate; 1 / Azeem; 2 / Amudhavanan; 3 / Dhanalakshmi; 4 / Manikandan; 5 / ADK; 6 / Rachitha; 7 / Myna; 8 / Kathiravan; 9 / Shivin; 10 / Vikraman
Week 11	Sponsor's Task (Day 75)	Preethi cooking task: Housemates will be divided into 2 teams of 4 each. The challenge is to cook items with milk, dhal, chicken & rice within 1 hour. The judges have to select the winning team based on number of items, taste & presentation.: Rachitha team: Rachitha, Manikandan, ADK & Azeem. (WON); Shivin team: Shivin, Amudhavanan, Kathiravan & Myna; Judges: Dhanalakshmi & Vikraman.
Week 11	Jail	None
Week 11	Saved contestants	Azeem, Kathirravan, Myna, Rachitha, Shivin and Vikraman were saved after facing the public vote.
Week 11	Exits	On day 77, Dhanalakshmi was evicted after facing public vote
Week 12	Entrances	None
Week 12	Captaincy Task	Azeem & Amudhavanan participated in the captaincy task. In this week task, both of them have to tie their back with ropes. After the first buzzer, they have to collect gifts shattered in the activity area. After the second buzzer, they have to count the gifts collected by them. The one who receives the maximum gifts will be the captain of this week.
Week 12	Captaincy Task	Winner– Amudhavanan
Week 12	Captaincy Task	Failed– Azeem
Week 12	House Captain	Amudhavanan
Week 12	Nominations	Amudhavanan, Azeem, ADK, Kathirravan, Myna, Manikandan, Shivin, and Vikraman were nominated for Week 12 Nominations.
Week 12	Luxury Budget Task	Engaluku ungala evlo teriyum: In this task, When the buzzer rings, housemates and their family members should answer 4 questions asked by BIGBOSS in the activity area to check their compatibility . Each correctly answered question carries 50 luxury budget points
Week 12	Weekly Task	Freeze or Release Task: Bigg boss will take full control over the task. He will instruct the housemates by using words like freeze, release, rewind, fast forward, sleep mode, and loop.; Family members of all the housemates will enter the BB house as a part of this freeze task.; Task: Nan yaar endru terikiratha ?..: Housemates must answer 2 questions before the dice in order to evaluate his position and quality in this BB house after 80 days.; Question 1: Housemates should explain how they are better when compared to others.; Question 2: Housemates have to identify another housemate whom they think, will qualify for finals along with them.; Other housemates should fill a glass full of sand in a beaker, when they are convinced with other's answers, if they are not convinced they have to voice out their opinions.; First 2 Housemates who received highest amount of sand in their beaker will be the winners of this task and selected for captaincy task of week 13.
Week 12	Jail	None
Week 12	Saved contestants	Amudhavanan, ADK, Azeem, Manikandan, Myna, Shivin and Vikraman were saved after facing the public votes.
Week 12	Exits	On day 84, Manikandan Rajesh was evicted after facing public vote.
Week 13	Entrances	None
Week 13	Captaincy Task	ADK & Azeem participated in the captaincy task. In this week task, both of them have to discuss what they have done in their big boss journey in order to become a rightful captain this week. The participant who agrees with what the opponent said, fails the task and the other participant becomes the house captain.
Week 13	Captaincy Task	Winner– ADK
Week 13	Captaincy Task	Failed– Azeem
Week 13	House Captain	ADK
Week 13	Nominations	ADK, Amudhavanan, Kathirravan, Myna, Rachitha, Shivin and Vikraman were nominated for Week 13 nominations.
Week 13	Sponsor's Task (Day 85)	Bru instant coffee aroma task: Housemates will be divided into 2 teams of 3 each. The challenge is a treasure hunt, after finding the bru's aroma, housemates have to search the BB house for the hidden secret code inside the pouches, with the help of clue's from the judges. The team which first unlocks the bru wooden box with the secret code will be the winner of this task.: Rachitha team: Rachitha, Vikraman & Amudhavanan. (WON); Shivin team: Shivin, Kathiravan & ADK.; Judges: Myna & Azeem.
Week 13	Sponsor's Task (Day 89)	Country delight cooking & QA task: Housemates will be divided into 2 teams of 3 each. Challenge will be in 2 rounds. In first round, HMs should answer the questions asked by the judges, Each correct answer fetches 10 points for the team. In round 2, the teams should prepare payasam based on the given ingredients. The judges should select the winner based on presentation and taste and awards them 30 points. The highest scoring team will be the overall winner of the task.: Shivin team: Shivin, Vikraman & ADK.; Myna team: Myna, Kathiravan & Amudhavanan. (WON); Judges: Rachitha & Azeem.
Week 13	Luxury Budget Task	None
Week 13	Weekly Task	Ticket To Finale Task: All the housemates need to participate in all of the TICKET TO FINALE TASKS(TTF).; At the end of each task, the winner will receive 8 TILES, and the next member will receive 1 tile less than the previous member, while the least scorer receives 1 TILE.; At the end of each physical task, the winner will be challenged by remaining HMs. The winner can decide with whom he must compete & the winner of the challenging task will receive challenging person's number of tiles.; Eventually, the housemate with maximum tiles at the end wins the ticket to the finale and enters the finale as 1st Finalist.; Housemates / TICKET TO FINALE TASKS & POINTS; Housemates / TASK 1 / TASK 2 / TASK 3 / TASK 4 / TASK 5 / TASK 6 / TASK 7 / TASK 8 / TASK 9 / TOTAL; Housemates / Rolling the ball / Neruku Ner / A Game of Balance / Than Kaalae Thanaku Udavi / Thanila gandam / Mithivandi ungal Vidhivandi / Pull the Pipe / Soapy Handball / Form the Image / Total Tiles; Azeem / 4 / 3 / 0 / 1 / 3 / 2 / 8 / 3 / 3 / 27; Amudhavanan / 7 / 5 / 7 / 8 / 3 / 7 / 7 / 8 / 5 / 57; Rachitha / 6 / 5 / 4 / 4 / 2 / 5 / 6 / 3 / 2 / 37; Kathiravan / 2 / 3 / 9 / 7 / 6 / 1 / 3 / 7 / 7 / 45; Myna / 9 / 3 / 5 / 6 / 1 / 6 / 2 / 3 / 1 / 36; Shivin / 3 / 8 / 2 / 3 / 7 / 4 / 1 / 6 / 8 / 42; Vikraman / 0 / 7 / 3 / 2 / 4 / 8 / 5 / 5 / 6 / 40; ADK / 5 / 3 / 6 / 5 / 10 / 3 / 4 / 3 / 4 / 43; Amudhavanan won ticket to finale and was declared the first finalist.
Week 13	Jail	None
Week 13	Saved contestants	ADK, Azeem, Kathirravan, Myna, Shivin and Vikraman were saved after facing the public votes.
Week 13	Exits	On Day 91, Rachitha Mahalakshmi was evicted after facing public vote.
Week 14	Entrances	None
Week 14	Ex-Contestants Entry	On day 94, Asal, Robert, Shanthi &G P Muthu entered the house for Pongal celebrations.; On day 95, Dhanalakshmi, Manikandan, Queency & Nivaashini entered the house for Pongal celebrations.; On day 96, Ram, Sherina & Maheshwari Chanakyan entered the house for Pongal celebrations.
Week 14	Captaincy Task	None
Week 14	House Captain	None
Week 14	Nominations	ADK, Azeem, Kathirravan, Myna, Shivin and Vikraman were nominated for Week 14 nominations.
Week 14	Luxury Budget Task	None
Week 14	Weekly Task	Unboxing task: On day 92, Suresh Chakravarthy and Ahmed Meeran entered the house to unbox the housemates and to advise them for their finale week.; Interview task: On day 93, VJ Parvathy & VJ Shobana entered the house to interview the housemates and to reveal the audience pulse to them.; Sacrifice task 1.0: Housemates may decide to do some sacrifices as instructed by the big boss to prove their level of commitment to the big boss show.; Sacrifice task 2.0: Housemates may decide to do some sacrifices as decided by the ex-contestants, if sacrifice 1.0 is not considered as worthy sacrifice.; Housemates / Sacrifice 1.0 / Sacrifice 2.0; ADK / To pack his own clothes & should wear other's clothes. / To tonsure his head leaving some area in the front.; Vikraman / To wax the hair in his hands & legs. / To clean shave his face one side only.; Azeem / To wear lungi, without wearing makeup & combing hair. / To wear saree/chudithar . (NOT ACCEPTED BY AZEEM).; Kathiravan / To dip one pair of his shoes in the paint. / To wear cripple top T-shirt & one side completely cut jeans.; Myna / To cut their hair short without seeing the mirror. / To cut her hair one side only.; Shivin / To cut their hair short without seeing the mirror. / To put Dark brown skin colored makeup.; Amudhavanan / To color his hair blonde. / To tonsure his head leaving some area in the center.
Week 14	Jail	None
Week 14	Saved contestants	Azeem, Kathirravan, Myna, Shivin and Vikraman were saved after facing the public votes.
Week 14	Exits	On Day 98, ADK was evicted after facing public vote.
Week 15 (Grand Finale Week)	Entrances	None
Week 15 (Grand Finale Week)	Ex-contestants entry	On Day 100, Rachitha Mahalakshmi, Ayesha Zeenath entered the house for reunion with the finalists.
Week 15 (Grand Finale Week)	Captaincy Task	None
Week 15 (Grand Finale Week)	House Captain	None
Week 15 (Grand Finale Week)	Luxury Budget Task	None
Week 15 (Grand Finale Week)	Weekly Task	None
Week 15 (Grand Finale Week)	Jail	None
Week 15 (Grand Finale Week)	Exits	On Day 100, Kathirravan Kabilan Walked out of the Bigg Boss house after accepting the first cash prize eviction with 3 Lakhs.; On Day 103, Amudhavanan Walked out of the Bigg Boss house after accepting the second cash prize eviction with 11.75 Lakhs.; On Day 103, Nandhini was evicted during mid-week eviction.
Week 15 (Grand Finale Week)	Finalists	During the final week the public vote for who they want to win Bigg Boss. The finalists for the title were as following: Mohamed Azeem; Shivin Ganesan; Vikraman Radhakrishnan
Day 105 Grand Finale
2nd Runner-up		Shivin Ganesan
1st Runner-up		Vikraman Radhakrishnan
Winner		Mohamed Azeem

== Nomination table ==
	Week 1			Week 2	Week 3	Week 4	Week 5	Week 6	Week 7	Week 8	Week 9	Week 10	Week 11	Week 12	Week 13		Week 14	Week 15			
	Week 1			Week 2	Week 3	Week 4	Week 5	Week 6	Week 7	Week 8	Week 9	Week 10	Week 11	Week 12	Day 85	Day 89 (Ticket to finale)	Week 14	Day 100	Day 103	Day 105; Grand Finale	
Nominees for House Captaincy	No Nominees			Janany; Muthu; Shanthi	Adk; Maheshwari; Queency; ~~Shanthi~~	Manikandan; Nivaashini; Queency	Amudhavanan; Nandhini; Robert	Amudhavanan; Manikandan; Rachitha; Vikraman	Dhanalakshmi; Kathirravan; Nandhini	Azeem; Shivin; Vikraman	Dhanalakshmi; Manikandan; Shivin	Amudhavanan; Nandhini; Rachitha	Adk; Amudhavanan; Manikandan	Amudhavanan; Azeem; ~~Dhanalakshmi~~	ADK; Azeem		No Nominees				
House Captain	No House; Captain			Muthu	Queency	Manikandan	Nandhini	Manikandan	Nandhini	Azeem	Manikandan	Nandhini	Manikandan	Amudhavanan	ADK		No House; Captain				
Captain's Nomination	No Nominations			Vikraman; Queency	Azeem; Rachitha	Vikraman; Shivin	Ayesha; Ram	Dhanalakshmi; Robert	Robert; Janany	Queency; Rachitha	Ram; Shivin	Manikandan; Vikraman	Shivin; Nandhini	Azeem, Nandhini (to evict); Kathiravan (to Save)	No Nominations		No Nominations				
Vote to:	Evict/Save (Task)			Evict										Evict/Save (Task)	Evict	Task	Evict	Cash Prize Eviction 1	Cash Prize Eviction 2	Win	
Azeem	Saved	Nominated		Shivin; Vikraman	Maheshwari; Ayesha	Maheshwari; Shivin	Maheshwari; Dhanalakshmi	Nivaashini; Ayesha	Dhanalakshmi; Ram	House; Captain	Ayesha; Janany	Rachitha; Janany	Shivin; Rachitha	Shivin (to evict)	Saved	Lost Ticket to Finale Task (Nominated)	ADK; Myna	Rejected Eviction	Rejected Eviction	Finalist	Winner (Day 105)
Vikraman	Nominated		Saved	Sherina; Kathirravan	Azeem; Maheshwari	Sherina; Kathirravan	Ayesha; Rachitha	Robert; Kathiravan	Dhanalakshmi; Robert	Queency; Rachitha	Azeem; Ayesha	Manikandan; Kathirravan	Dhanalakshmi; Kathirravan	Manikandan, Azeem, Nandhini (to evict)	Nominated	Lost Ticket to Finale Task (Nominated)	Azeem; Kathirravan	Rejected Eviction	Rejected Eviction	Finalist	1st Runner-Up (Day 105)
Shivin	Saved			Adk; Janany	Azeem; Maheshwari	Maheshwari; Azeem	Maheshwari; Azeem	Azeem; Dhanalakshmi	Azeem; Dhanalakshmi	Queency; Janany	Azeem; Janany	Azeem; Manikandan	Azeem; Dhanalakshmi	Azeem, ADK (to evict)	Nominated	Lost Ticket to Finale Task (Nominated)	Azeem; ADK	Rejected Eviction	Rejected Eviction	Finalist	2nd Runner-Up (Day 105)
Nandhini	Not In House			Vikraman; Queency	Maheshwari; Azeem	Azeem; Ayesha	House; Captain	Azeem; Dhanalakshmi	House; Captain	Rachitha; Dhanalakshmi	Ayesha; Ram	House; Captain	Shivin; Dhanalakshmi	Azeem, Amudhavanan (to evict)	Nominated	Lost Ticket to Finale Task (Nominated)	Azeem; Kathirravan	Rejected Eviction	Rejected Eviction	Evicted (Day 103)	
Amudhavanan	Saved			Vikraman; Shivin	Maheshwari; Adk	Ayesha; Azeem	Azeem; Adk	Dhanalakshmi; Ayesha	Adk; Ram	Kathiravan; Queency	Ayesha; Kathiravan	Manikandan; Rachitha	Nandhini; Dhanalakshmi	House Captain Nominated	~~Nominated~~	Won Ticket to Finale Task (Saved)	Nandhini; ADK	Rejected Eviction	Accepted Eviction	Evicted With 11.75 Lakh (Day 103)	
Kathirravan	Saved			Vikraman; Nivaashini	Azeem; Janany	Azeem; Dhanalakshmi	Dhanalakshmi; Vikraman	Dhanalakshmi; Shivin	Dhanalakshmi; Amudhavanan	Janany; Manikanda	Amudhavanan; Azeem	Janany; Azeem	Vikraman; Rachitha	ADK, Amudhavanan (to evict); Azeem (to save)	Nominated	Lost Ticket to Finale Task (Nominated)	Shivin; Vikraman	Accepted Eviction	Evicted With 3 Lakh (Day 100)		
ADK	Saved			Shivin; Shanthi	Azeem; Ayesha	Azeem; Ayesha	Queency; Janany	Nivaashini; Queency	Amudhavanan; Azeem	Dhanalakshmi; Rachitha	Ayesha; Janany	Rachitha; Azeem	Dhanalakshmi; Shivin	Kathiravan (to evict); Azeem (to save)	House Captain Nominated	Lost Ticket to Finale Task (Nominated)	Shivin; Nandhini	Evicted (Day 98)			
Rachitha	Saved			Queency; Nivaashini	Azeem; Maheshwari	Azeem; Adk	Ayesha; Adk	Queency; Adk	Manikandan; Robert	Nandhini; Queency	Ram; Adk	Adk; Vikraman	Azeem; Kathiravan	Azeem, ADK (to evict); Shivin (to save)	Nominated	Lost Ticket to Finale Task (Nominated)	Evicted (Day 91)				
Manikandan	Saved			Robert; Vikraman	Rachitha; Maheshwari	House; Captain	Ayesha; Vikraman	House; Captain	Amudhavanan; Kathirravan	Rachitha; Janany	House; Captain	Vikraman; Azeem	House; Captain	Vikraman, Shivin (to evict); Azeem (to save)	Evicted (Day 84)						
Dhanalakshmi	Saved		Nominated	Rachitha; Asal	Asal; Adk	Ayesha; Adk	Ram; Vikraman	Queency; Azeem	Azeem; Manikandan	Queency; Kathirravan	Adk; Ram	Adk; Vikraman	Vikraman; Rachitha	Evicted (Day 77)							
Janany	Nominated	Saved		Shivin; Nivaashini	Ayesha; Azeem	Kathirravan; Sherina	Adk; Nivaashini	Dhanalakshmi; Nivaashini	Manikandan; Kathirravan	Nandhini; Shivin	Ayesha; Kathirravan	Adk; Rachitha	Evicted (Day 70)								
Ayesha	Saved	Nominated	Saved	Vikraman; Shivin	Azeem; Asal	Azeem; Kathirravan	Amudhavanan; Robert	Janany; Robert	Amudhavanan; Manikandan	Nandhini; Rachitha	Vikraman; Azeem	Evicted (Day 63)									
Ram	Saved	Nominated		Sheriina; Shanthi	Ayesha; Sheriina	Myna; Kathirravan	Maheshwari; Ayesha	Nivaashini; Queency	Amudhavanan; Azeem	Rachitha; Queency	Janany; Ayesha	Evicted (Day 62)									
Queency	Nominated	Saved		Rachitha; Shanthi	House; Captain	Azeem; Dhanalakshmi	Adk; Dhanalakshmi	Janany; Azeem	Amudhavanan; Manikandan	Dhanalakshmi; Rachitha	Evicted (Day 56)										
Robert	Saved			Vikraman; Ayesha	Ayesha; Azeem	Azeem; Ayesha	Azeem; Ayesha	Azeem; Dhanalakshmi	Azeem; Manikandan	Evicted (Day 49)											
Nivaashini	Nominated	Saved		Shanthi; Ayesha	Azeem; Ayesha	Sheriina; Ayesha	Ram; Ayesha	Dhanalakshmi; Kathiravan	Evicted (Day 42)												
Maheshwari	Saved		Nominated	Vikraman; Shivin	Azeem; Asal	Vikraman; Azeem	Ram; Ayesha	Evicted (Day 35)													
Sheriina	Saved			Vikraman; Shivin	Janany; Azeem	Rachitha; Vikraman	Evicted (Day 28)														
Asal	Saved			Shivin; Vikraman	Ayesha; Maheshwari	Evicted (Day 21)															
Shanthi	Saved			Vikraman; Queency	Evicted (Day 14)																
Muthu	Saved			House; Captain	Walked (Day 13)																
Notes	1, 2, 3			4, 5, 6, 7	8, 9, 10, 11		12	13		14	15	16			17, 18		19, 20	21	22	23, 24, 25, 26, 27	
Against Public Vote	~~Ayesha~~; Azeem; Dhanalakshmi; Maheshwari; Ram; ~~Janany~~; ~~Nivaashini~~; ~~Queency~~; ~~Shanthi~~; ~~Vikraman~~			Ayesha; Azeem; Dhanalakshmi; Maheshwari; Nivaashini; Queency; Rachitha; Ram; Shanthi; Sheriina; Shivin; Vikraman	Adk; Asal; Ayesha; Azeem; Janany; Maheshwari; Rachitha	Ayesha; Azeem; Kathirravan; Sheriina; Vikraman	Adk; Ayesha; Azeem; Dhanalakshmi; Maheshwari; Ram; Vikraman	Ayesha; Azeem; Dhanalakshmi; Janany; Kathirravan; Nivaashini; Queency; Robert	Amudhavanan; Azeem; Dhanalakshmi; Kathirravan; Manikandan; Ram; Robert	Dhanalakshmi; Janany; Kathirravan; Nandhini; Queency; Rachitha; Shivin	Adk; Ayesha; Azeem; Janany; Kathirravan; Ram	Adk; Azeem; Janany; Manikandan; Rachitha; Vikraman	Azeem; Dhanalakshmi; Kathirravan; Nandhini; Rachitha; Shivin; Vikraman	Adk; Azeem; Amudhavanan; Kathirravan; Manikandan; Nandhini; Shivin; Vikraman	Adk; Kathirravan; Nandhini; Rachitha; Shivin; Vikraman; ~~Amudhavanan~~		Azeem; Adk; Kathirravan; Nandhini; Shivin; Vikraman	Amudhavanan; Azeem; Kathirravan; Nandhini; Shivin; Vikraman	Amudhavanan; Azeem; Nandhini; Shivin; Vikraman	Azeem; Shivin; Vikraman	
Sent to BB Jail	None			Janany; Ram	Azeem; Shivin	Ram; Vikraman; Amudhavanan	None	Robert; Rachitha	Robert; Queency	None											
Punishment for Worst Performers	None									Azeem; Nandhini	Vikraman; Shivin	Janany; Rachitha	None								
Walked	None			Muthu	None															None	
Evicted	No; Eviction			Shanthi	Asal	Sheriina	Maheshwari	Nivaashini	Robert	Queency	Ram	Janany	Dhanalakshmi	Manikandan	Rachitha		ADK	Kathirravan	Nandhini	Shivin	
Evicted	No; Eviction			Shanthi	Asal	Sheriina	Maheshwari	Nivaashini	Robert	Queency	Ayesha	Janany	Dhanalakshmi	Manikandan	Rachitha		ADK	Kathirravan	Amudhavanan	Vikraman	Azeem

indicates Celebrity contestant
indicates Commoner contestant
indicates the House Captain
indicates the Nominees for House Captaincy
indicates that the Housemate was directly nominated for eviction prior to the regular nominations process
indicates that the housemate went to secret room
indicates that the Housemate was granted immunity from nominations
indicates the contestant has been sent to the Bigg Boss Jail as a punishment
indicates the winner
indicates the first runner up
indicates the second runner up
indicates the third runner up
indicates the contestant has been walked out of the show
indicates the contestant has been evicted
indicates the housemate evicted themselve after accepting a cash prize eviction .

=== Notes ===
- ^Note 1: Janany, Nivaashini, Queency and Vikraman were nominated as the 4 least interactive housemates on Launch Day, hence they are also directly nominated for Week 2 nomination process against public vote.
- ^Note 2: Each club member had the power to swap a nominated housemate with a safe housemate on Day 3, Janany, Nivaashiyni and Queency were all swapped and became safe while Vikraman remained in the nomination list. After the swap Ayesha, Azeem, Ram and Vikraman were nominated for week 2 eviction.
- ^Note 3: On day 4, Each club member had the power to make their finalized swap and make any changes to the nomination list. After the finalized swap Azeem, Dhanalakshmi, Maheshwari and Ram nominated for week 2 eviction. Ayesha and Vikraman was swapped and became safe.
- ^Note 4: On Day 7, Nandhini entered the house as a wildcard contestant. She was thus immune from the Week 2 nomination process.
- ^Note 5: Amudhavanan, Dhanalakshmi, Kathirravan, Nandhini, Nivaashiyni, Manikandan, Robert and Shivin entered nomination free zone in week 3 after successfully accomplishing a task in week 2. therefore they are saved from week 3 nomination process.
- ^Note 6: Janany and Ram were sent to the Bigg Boss jail in week 2 as a punishment after being ranked in the bottom 2 category by the co housemates.
- ^Note 7: GP Muthu wanted to see his son who was sick so he walked out from BiggBoss on Day 13.
- ^Note 8: Since Shanthi was evicted on Day 14 (week 2) she was scrapped from the captaincy nomination. On suggestion from BiggBoss, she named Queency as her replacement.
- ^Note 9: Queency won the week 3 captaincy task and was the second captain for the Bigg Boss house.
- ^Note 10: Azeem and Shivin were sent to the Bigg Boss jail in week 3 as a punishment after being selected by all the housemates as the worst performers of the week.
- ^Note 11: During NEEYUM BOMMAI NAANUM BOMMAI task, Amudhavanan, Ram and Robert manage to secure their dolls without getting eliminated, hence they were granted the power to avoid getting nominated for Week 4 nomination process.
- ^Note 12: Amudhavanan and Manikandan where selected as best performers of the week and were saved from nomination. Dhanalakshmi's team won the Sweet Factory task and as a leader she was saved from nomination, however she got the option to select the best player in her team and she selected Rachitha. Hence Rachitha is also saved from nomination. And all four of them were selected for captaincy task.
- ^Note 13: Dhanalakshmi was removed from captaincy task, instead it was given to Vikraman due to fair play in Sweet Factory task and Dhanalakshmi's team was disqualified by the Host.
- ^Note 14: During BOGABIZZAVUM ALIENGALUM task, Dhanalakshmi and Rachitha had a lot of stone from their team respectively and were saved from Week 9 Nominations.
- ^Note 15: There is a double eviction in 9th week. Ram was evicted on Day 62 and Ayesha was evicted on Day 63.
- ^Note 16: During SHORTCUT task, Adk, Amudhavanan, Janany and Manikandan managed to secure their position as angels, hence they were granted the power to avoid getting nominated for Week 11 nomination process, except Janany was evicted on Day 70.
- ^Note 17: In Week 13 Ticket to finale task commenced.
- ^Note 18: Since Amudhavanan won the ticket to finale task he was immediately removed from Week 13 nomination list and making him the 1st finalist of the season.
- ^Note 19: All housemates besides Amudhavanan (finalist) was nominated for eviction process since it was the semi-final week.
- ^Note 20: ADK was the final housemate evicted by facing public vote for the season.
- ^Note 21: On Day 100, Kathirravan accepted the cash prize eviction and left the Bigg Boss house.
- ^Note 22: On Day 103, Amudhavanan accepted the cash prize eviction and left the Bigg Boss house.Nandini Evicted on Day 103
- ^Note 23: Azeem, Shivin and Vikraman became the top three finalist of the season
- ^Note 24: On Day 103, Nandhini was evicted during mid-week eviction.

== Nominations faced ==
In the order of total number of nominations faced:-

Number	Contestant	Total	Final Position
1	Azeem	10	Winner
2	Kathirravan	10	Evicted in 6th position
3	Vikraman	8	1st Runner-Up
4	ADK	7	Evicted in 7th position
5	Dhanalakshmi	7	Evicted in 10th position
6	Ayesha	6	Evicted in 12th position
7	Shivin	6	2nd Runner-Up
8	Nandhini	6	Evicted in 4th position
9	Rachitha	6	Evicted in 8th position
10	Janany	5	Evicted in 11th position
11	Ram	5	Evicted in 13th position
12	Maheshwari	4	Evicted in 17th position
13	Queency	3	Evicted in 14th position
14	Manikandan	3	Evicted in 9th position
15	Amudhavanan	2	Evicted in 5th position
16	Nivaashini	2	Evicted in 16th position
17	Robert	2	Evicted in 15th position
18	Sheriina	2	Evicted in 18th position
19	Shanthi	1	Evicted in 20th position
20	Asal	1	Evicted in 19th position
21	Muthu	0	Walked in 21st position
