= Vikraman Radhakrishnan =

Indian actor and politician (born 1988)

Spokesperson of Viduthalai Chiruthaigal Katchi party
- In office 2020–2022

Personal details
- Born: R. Vikraman; 24 August 1988 (age 37)
- Occupation: Actor, Politician

Vikraman Radhakrishnan (born 24 August 1988) is an Indian actor and former politician who primarily works in Tamil television. He made debuted into television as a host in the talk show Nadanthathu Enna? Kutramum Pinnaniyum in 2016. Vikraman is best known for his portrayal of Vikram in Vinnaithaandi Varuvaayaa (2016). He appeared in Tamil reality show Bigg Boss (Tamil season 6) as a contestant and later emerged as the 1st runner-up.

== Career ==
Radhakrishnan began his television career in 2016, he debuted in the talk show Nadanthathu Enna? Kutramum Pinnaniyum in 2016. Later that same year he made his first acting debut in the television drama EMI - Thavanai Murai Vazhkai playing the lead role as Santhosh alongside actors Pavani Reddy, Shyam Sunder and Haripriya. He later went on to act in another drama serial called Vinnaithaandi Varuvaayaa which aired on Star Vijay starring alongside actress Madhumila.

In 2020, Vikraman joined Viduthalai Chiruthaigal Katchi political party and was a spokesperson from 2020 to 2022.

== Television ==
Year	Title	Role	Channel	Notes	Ref.
2016	Nadanthathu Enna? Kutramum Pinnaniyum	Host	Star Vijay	Talk Show	
2016	EMI - Thavanai Murai Vazhkai.	Mahesh	Sun TV	TV Serial	
2016	Vinnaithaandi Varuvaayaa	Vikram	Star Vijay	TV Serial	
2018	Star War	Host	Sun TV	Reality TV	
2022–2023	Bigg Boss (Tamil season 6)	Contestant	Star Vijay	Reality Show; 1st Runner-Up	
