= Maheshwari Chanakyan =

Indian actress

- Born: Chennai, India
- Other names: V.J. Maheswari, Mahi
- Education: University of Madras
- Occupations: Actress; television presenter
- Years active: 2010–present
- Known for: Puthu Kavithai
- Spouse: Chanakyan (m.2005 - div. 2010)
- Children: 1

Maheshwari Chanakyan better known as V.J. Maheswari is an Indian actress and a former television presenter who predominantly appears in Tamil television shows and films. She is best known for playing the role of Kavya in Star Vijay's popular soap opera Puthu Kavithai. She also appeared in the blockbuster film Vikram in 2022.

== Early life ==
Maheshwari was born to Sreenivasan and Latha in Chennai, Tamil Nadu, India. Maheshwari did her schooling at Adarsh Vidyalaya, T. Nagar, and then graduated from the University of Madras in Chennai.

== Career ==
In 2010, Maheshwari made her debut in the low-budget film Kuyil. As soon as she made her acting debut she also acted television advertisements shoots and modeling photo shoots. In this period Maheshwari developed interest in anchoring and hosting.

In 2013, she made her television debut as an actress on TV, she appeared in the romantic serial Puthu Kavithai which aired on Star Vijay opposing actor Dinesh. She also appeared in the soap opera Thayumanavan playing the role as Mahalakshmi, the serial also aired on Star Vijay. She later announced that she quit doing serials for some personal reasons and moved on to anchoring.

Maheswari also later anchored and hosted television shows such as Comedy Khiladis and Petta Rap which both aired on Zee Tamil.

In 2021, actor Kamal Haasan approached Maheshwari offering her a role in his film Vikram, she later agreed to the offer and was cast in the film opposite actor Vijay Sethupathi.

== Personal life ==
In the 2005, Maheshwari married Chanakyan, and the couple have a boy Keshav. However, later in 2010 the couple separated and were divorced. She is also a costume designer.

== Filmography ==
=== Films ===
Year	Title	Role	Notes
2010	Kuyil	Madhu	
2010	Mandhira Punnagai	Hemavathy	
2016	Chennai 600028 II	Stella	
2018	Pyaar Prema Kaadhal	Abhi	
2021	Writer	Thangaraj's second wife	
2021	Soulmate	Amudha	Short film
2022	Don	Contest anchor	
2022	Vishamakaran	Paravthy	
2022	Vikram	Kausalya Sandhanam	
2025	Varunan	Raani	
2026	Mustafa Mustafa		
TBA	Kadhal Conditions Apply		

=== Television ===
Year	Title	Role	Notes
2010	Asatha Povathu Yaaru?	Guest	
2013 - 2015	Puthu Kavithai	Kavya	
2013–2014	Thayumanavan	Mahalakshmi	
2014	Naduvula Konjam Disturb Pannuvom	Participant	
2015–2017	Isai Aruvi	Host	
2015–2018	Athirshtalaskhmi	Host	
2018–present	Comedy Khiladis	Host	
2018–present	Petta Rap	Host	
2021	Amman	Sulakshana	
2022 - 2023	Bigg Boss Tamil Season 6	Contestant	Evicted on Day 35; Guest for 14th and 15th weeks Sandaimarutham Award
2022	Oo Solriya Oo Oohm Solriya	Participant	
2023	Bigg Boss Kondattam	Herself	
