= Sakthivel: Theeyaai Oru Theeraa Kaadhal =

- Genre: Drama; Romance
- Based on: Mann Kee Awaaz Pratigya
- Developed by: Pearl Grey (original screen play); Manoj Ramachandran
- Written by: C.U. Muthuselvan
- Directed by: Sulaiman K Babu
- Starring: Vikram Shri; Anjali Baskar
- Music by: Kanishwaran
- Country of origin: India
- Original language: Tamil
- No. of seasons: 2
- No. of episodes: 707

Production
- Producers: Parthiban Vijayakumar; Prabhas Vijayakumar
- Editor: Sk.Abdulsuhel
- Camera setup: Multi-camera
- Running time: 22 minutes

Original release
- Network: Star Vijay
- Release: 4 December 2023 – 28 March 2026

Related
- Puthu Kavithai

Sakthivel: Theeyaai Oru Theeraa Kaadhal is an Indian Tamil-language drama television series. The first season of the series starred Pravin Adithya and Anjali Baskar in the lead. It is an official remake of Mann Kee Awaaz Pratigya which aired on STAR Plus and reboot version of 2015 series Puthu Kavithai .The story is based around Velan, a rowdy who falls in love with Sakthi, who's determined to fight for her rights at any cost. It currently airs on Star Vijay from 4 December 2023, on Monday to Saturday and streams on Disney+ Hotstar.

The first season ended on 18 October 2025. The second season of the series started with the continuation of the first season with a 7 year leap and starring Vikram Shri (who replaced Pravin Adithya) with Anjali Baskar. It premiered on 21 October 2025 and ended on 28 March 2026.

== Plot ==
The narrative unfolds with Velan, a rogue operating under his father's helm, and Sakthi, a woman staunchly upholding her principles in society. When a confrontation with Prakash, one of Velan's subordinates, at a waterpark leads to Prakash and his gang's arrest, Sakthi's actions draw the attention of Velan's influential father, Sivapathi. Prakash, released under Sivapathi's influence, informs Velan about Sakthi's role in his arrest.

Upon learning of Sakthi's involvement, Velan, feeling embarrassed, rebukes Prakash and orders him to gather more information about Sakthi. However, when Velan personally encounters Sakthi, he is not only furious but also unexpectedly captivated by her. Determined to make her his future wife, Velan warns his gang to stay away from Sakthi at any cost.

Despite Velan's intentions, Sakthi harbors a strong disliking for him after witnessing his aggressive eviction of a broker's family. Velan, undeterred, attempts to woo Sakthi by sending anonymous love letters and showering her with gifts. Their first in-person meeting takes an unfortunate turn when the broker's wife curses Velan for their eviction, intensifying Sakthi's disgust.

The story then follows the tumultuous journey of Velan and Sakthi as they navigate through obstacles, eventually leading to their marriage and the development of a deep, yet challenging, love.

== Cast ==
=== Main ===
- Pravin Adithya (Season 1) → Vikram Shri (Season 2) as Velmurugan "Velan" Sivapathi, Sivapathi's 2nd son and Sakthi’s husband - a rogue who works under his father's wing.
- Anjali Baskar as Sakthi, Velan’s wife - a woman who is determined to stand up for her rights in society.

=== Supporting ===
- Reshma Prasad as Meenalochini "Meenal" Cheran, Sivapathi's daughter, Thennarasu and Velan's younger sister and Cheran's wife.
- Merwen Balaji as Cheran, Sakthi's and Porselvi's older brother, Gowri's former love interest and Meena's husband. (Main Antagonist)
- Unknown (Season 2) as Abi, Velan and Sakthi's daughter.
- Vasudevan SKR as Sikkal Sivapathi, Arasu, Velan and Meenal's father and a notorious rowdy with major influence in the area.
- Shanthi as Paranjothi, Arasu, Velan and Meenal's mother.
- VJ Sandhiya (Season 1) → Sahana Shetty (Season 2) as Thenammai, Thennarasu's widow, Anbu Chezhiyen wife.
- Vibish Aswanth as Anbu Chezhiyen, Thenammai's second husband. (Season 2)
- K. S. G. Venkatesh as Meiyanadhan, Cheran, Sakthi and Porselvi's father.
- Meena Vemuri → Baby Joyce as Kasthuri, Cheran, Sakthi and Porselvi's mother.
- Maheswari Yayathiraj → Lailaa as Porselvi, Cheran and Sakthi’s younger sister and Naveen's wife.
- Magesh (Season 1) → Unknown (Season 2) as Dr. Naveen Raj (Season 1) → Inspector Naveen Raj (Season 2), Porselvi's husband.
- Unknown → Vaishnavi Nayak as Ramya (Season 2)
- J. Durai Raj as Vikram (Season 2)
- Sivan Srinivasan as Rathnavel, Ramya and Vikram's father. (Season 2)
- Unknown as Kanchana, Ramya and Vikram's mother. (Season 2)
- Unknown → Sudha Prakash as Anbu Chezhiyen's mother (Season 2)
- Fawaz Zayani → Abhinash as Deepan (Season 2)

=== Former ===
- Shalini as Gowri, Sakthi's friend and Cheran's former love interest. (Season 1)
- Gemini Mani as Markendeyan, Velan's uncle and close friend who aids him with his love. (Season 1)
- Suganya Vish as Ramya, Cheran's friend. (Season 1)
- Gowri Shankar as Velan's uncle. (Season 1)
- Chandru as Prakash, a member of Velan's gang. (Dead) (Killed by Cheran) (Season 1)
- Saif as Amudhan, Sakthi's ex-fiancé (Season 1)
- Maanas Chavali as Vikram (Season 1)
- Priya as Azhagammai, Sivapathi's mother, Arasu, Velan and Meenal's grandmother. (Dead) (Season 1)
- Shyam Viswanathan as Thennarasu "Arasu" Sivapathi, Sivapathi's elder son, Velan and Meenal's older brother and Thenammai's husband. (Main Antagonist) (Dead) (Killed by Cheran) (Season 1)

== Production ==
=== Casting ===
Anjali Baskar was selected for the female lead role of Sakthi in the series after her notable performances in Priyamaana Thozhi on Sun TV, marking her first project as a main lead. Pravin Adithya, a well-experienced actor who gained fame from his movie Appuchi Graamam, was chosen for the male lead role of Velan but he quit the series and replaced by Vikram Shri in October 2025. Shanthi, known for her portrayal of mother characters, was cast as Velavan's mother Paramsothy, whilst Reshma Prasad and Merwen Balaji were cast in supporting sibling roles respectively.

In end of March 2025, Actress Lailaa was cast as Selvi. In 2025, actor Fawaz Zayani entered the show as Deepan. However, he also left, resulting in Abhinash to play the role in February 2026.

=== Release ===
On 10 November 2023, the first promo was released, giving a brief insight into Velan's life as well as the first interaction between him and Sakthi. The second promo was released on 18 November 2023, where Velan and his gang intervene during Sakthi's prospective marriage - cancelling it. The third promo was released on 24 November 2023, revealing the forced marriage between Vel and Sakthi, as well as the release date for the serial.

It began aired on Star Vijay, from 4 December, replacing Kanne Kalaimaane.
