= Achcham Thavir =

- Genre: Game show
- Presented by: Dhivyadharshini, Kavinraj, Jagan
- Country of origin: India
- Original language: Tamil
- No. of seasons: 1

Production
- Camera setup: Multi-camera
- Running time: approx. 40-45 minutes per episode

Original release
- Network: Star Vijay
- Release: 2 June – 4 September 2016

Achcham Thavir (transl. Keep Fear Away) is a 2016 Indian Tamil-language stunt/dare reality-comedy game show, based on the U.S. TV series 'Fear Factor'. The show aired from 2 June 2016 until 4 September 2016 on Thursday to Sunday at 7:00PM IST on Star Vijay. The show was hosted by Dhivyadharshini. The show was won by actress Madhumila based on the final points.

== Contestants ==
=== Team A ===
Celebrities	Occupation
Senthil Kumar	Television presenter, Tamil TV & Film Actor, Radio jockey
Gayatri Jayaraman	Actor, Model, Television presenter
Priyanka Deshpande	Television presenter
Ma Ka Pa Anand	Television presenter, Radio Jockey, Video Jockey, Tamil Film Actor
Madhumila	Television presenter, Tamil TV & Film Actress,
Bharani	Tamil Film Actor
Amuthavanan	Standup Comedian, Dancer, Tamil Film Actor

=== Team B ===
Celebrities	Occupation
Sonia Agarwal	Film & Tamil TV Actress, Model
Ganesh Venkatraman	Actor, Model, Television presenter
Gayathiri	Tamil & Telugu TV Actress
Amit Bhargav	Television presenter, Radio Jockey, Video Jockey, Actor, Voice Actor
Siddharth	Tamil TV Actor
Gayathrie	Film Actress
Sanjana Singh	Film Actress

=== Final results ===
Celebrities	Places	Note
Madhumila	1st	Winner
Ganesh Venkatraman	2nd	1st Runner-up
Amuthavanan	3rd	2nd Runner-up
Sanjana Singh	4th	3rd Runner-up
Siddharth Kumaran	5th	Evicted
Bharani	6th	Evicted
Gayathrie	7th	Evicted
Senthil Kumar	8th	Evicted
Sonia Agarwal	9th	Evicted
Gayathiri	10th	Walked
Priyanka Deshpande	11th	Evicted
Gayatri Jayaraman	12th	Evicted
Ma Ka Pa Anand	13th	Walked
Amit Bhargav	14th	Evicted

== Semi-final ==
=== Team A ===
Celebrities	Occupation
Madhumila	Television presenter, Tamil TV & Film Actress,
Bharani	Tamil Film Actor
Amuthavanan	Standup Comedian, Dancer, Tamil Film Actor

=== Team B ===
Celebrities	Occupation
Ganesh Venkatraman	Actor, Model, Television presenter
Sanjana Singh	Film Actress
Siddharth	Tamil TV Actor

== Finals & Points ==
Celebrities	Points
Madhumila	33 [Winner]
Ganesh Venkatraman	31
Amuthavanan	29
Sanjana Singh	27
