= Pasamalar (TV series) =

- Genre: Soap opera
- Written by: Dialogues by R.Prabhakar & V.Padmavathy
- Screenplay by: Sekkizhar; Siva.lla Amalraj
- Directed by: Sadhasivam Perumaal; Azhagar; S.Sundaramoorthy
- Creative director: Sujatha Vijayakumar
- Starring: Stalin; Chandra Lakshman; Shamily Sukumar; Shilpa Mary Teresa; Pavani Reddy; Pradeep Kumar; Jeevitha; Yuvarani; Bhuvaneshwari; Guru Aravind
- Theme music composer: Rajkumar Rajamanikkam (Title Song); Hari (Background Score)
- Opening theme: "Enna Thavam Seinthano" "Edhu varayil edhuvimendri"
- Country of origin: India
- Original language: Tamil
- No. of seasons: 3
- No. of episodes: 983

Production
- Producer: Sujatha Vijaykumar
- Cinematography: Bala; P.Chithirai Selvan
- Editors: V.Karthik; Manikandan Ravi
- Camera setup: Multi-camera
- Running time: approx. 20-22 minutes per episode
- Production company: Home Movie Makers

Original release
- Network: Sun TV
- Release: 7 October 2013 – 31 December 2016

Pasamalar is a 2013-2016 Indian Tamil-language soap opera that aired on Sun TV. A prime time serial, it premiered on 7 October 2013 to 31 December 2016 for 983 episodes. It was initially aired from Monday to Friday at 6:30PM IST and later extended up to Saturday. The show starred Stalin, Chandra Lakshman and Shamily Sukumar in the lead roles as Poovarasu, Thamarai and Mallika. while, Pavani Reddy, Pradeep Kumar, Yuvarani, Shilpa Mary Teresa, Jeevitha, Guru Aravind, Bhuvaneshwari and others playing a supporting roles. It is produced by Home Movie Makers and directed by Sadhasivam Perumaal and Azhagar, S.Sundarmoorthy.

It revolves around the lives of 3 siblings, whose affection and love remain unchanged through highs and lows. Poovarasu (Stalin) has been taking care of his two younger sisters, Thamarai (Chandra Lakshman) and Mallika (Shamily Sukumar) from the age of 10 after their parents' untimely death.

== Plot ==
Paasamalar is a story about the love shared by an elder brother and his two younger sisters. Poovarasu is taking care of his sisters, Thamarai and Mallika, from the age of ten after his parents died. Poovarasu sacrifices his interests and desires to care for his sisters. He works in a small engineering factory, Thamarai takes care of the family while Mallika goes to college and has a different attitude towards life.

== Cast ==
- Stalin as Poovarasu (1–983)
- Leena Nair ("Pritika") (1–197) → Chandra Lakshman (197–983) as Thamarai - Poovarasu's 1st younger sister
- Laxmy Priya (1–85) → Shamily Sukumar (85–983) as Mallika - Poovarasu's 2nd younger sister
- Nithin Iyer (1–100) → Sathya Shyam (100–983) as Vimal - Mallika's husband
- Guru Aravind (1–983) as Paarivendan "Paari" - Thamarai's husband
- Devipriya (1–351) → Shilpa Mary Teresa (378–983) as Kokila - Poovarasu's 1st wife
  - Shilpa also portrayed as Mary (715–900) – Kokila's medium, a Christian
- Sherin Farhana as Ahalya (665–983) – Poovarasu and Kokila's daughter
- Lakshmi Viswanath (1–333) → Jeevitha (675–983) as Uma - Poovarasu's ex-lover latter his 2nd wife
- Pavani Reddy as Bharathi (675–983) – Mallika's best friend
- Pradeep Kumar as Pradeep (700–983) – Bharathi's husband
- Naresh Eswar as Vikram (765–983) – Bharathi's cousin
- Yuvarani as Vaitheeshwari (755–983) – Bharathi's arch-rival
- Jennifer Antony (100–415) → Bhuvaneswari (415–765) as Bhuvaneshwari - Thamarai and Mallika's arch-rival (Dead)
- Priya as Karpagam – Poovarasu's aunt (1–983)
- Gayathri Yuvraaj as Eshwari (1–983) – Paari's 1st younger sister
- Sambhavi Gurumoorthy as Vennila (1–983) – Paari's 2nd younger sister
- Bharathi Kannan (1–375) → Azhagu (376–983) as Kaliappan – Paari's father
- Rekha Suresh as Maragatham (700–983) – Bharathi's mother
- Sathya Sai Krishnan (725–983) as Narmada – Bharathi's younger sister
- Naga lakshmi as Annapoorani (1–983) – Paari's mother
- Krithika Ladoo as Jennifer (1–983) – Vimal's best friend
- Syamantha Kiran as Devi – Bhuvaneshwari's younger sister (575–888) (Dead)
- Vinoth Sampath as Sanjay (1–890) (Dead) – Bhuvaneshwari's son also Vennila's ex-lover
- Aravind as Surya – Paari's best friend (498–615)
- Shweta as Shruthi (500–615) – Surya's wife
- Manoharan as Thangamani – Pradeep's father (815–983)
- Deepa Nethran as Raji – Pradeep's mother (815–983)
- Sabarna Anand as Swathi / Kumuthini (696–733) – Paari's housemaid
- Aanandhi as Kayal (725–983) – Bharathi's elder sister
- Suresh
- Shyam as Shyam (728–983) – Kayal's husband
- Sripriya as Valli – Paari's elder sister (1–983)
- Sivaranjani as Charu – Paari's ex-lover (1–300)
- Annapoorni as Alamelumangai
- J. Lalitha as Mary's mother
- Subbaiyah (1–350)
- Karthick Vasudevan as Chezhiyan (1–357)
- Murali Kumar
- Dubbing Janaki

=== Guest appearances ===
- Khushbu Sundar as Kushboo
- Sujitha Dhanush as Goddess Amman

== Awards and nominations ==
| Year | Award | Category | Recipient | Role | Result |
|---|---|---|---|---|---|
| 2014 | Sun Kudumbam Awards | Best Brother Awards | Stalin | Poovarasu | Won |
| 2014 | Sun Kudumbam Awards | Best Son-in-Law | Stalin | Poovarasu | Nominated |
| 2014 | Sun Kudumbam Awards | Best Female Negative Role | Devi Priya | Kokila | Nominated |
| 2014 | Sun Kudumbam Awards | Best Music Director Award | Visu | | Nominated |
| 2014 | Sun Kudumbam Awards | Best Editor Award | Karthik | | Nominated |
| 2014 | Sun Kudumbam Awards | Best Mamanar | Bharathi Kannan | Kailappan | Nominated |

== See also ==
- List of programs broadcast by Sun TV
