= Senjittale En Kadhala =

Senjittle En Kadhala
- Theatrical release poster
- Directed by: Ezhil Durai
- Produced by: S. Balasubramaniam
- Starring: Ezhil Durai; Madhumila; Abhinaya
- Cinematography: M. Manish
- Edited by: Lawrence Kishore
- Music by: F. Raj Bharath
- Production company: SB Entertainment
- Release date: 7 April 2017
- Country: India
- Language: Tamil

Senjittale En Kadhala (transl. She's Ended My Love) is a 2017 Indian Tamil-language romantic drama film written and directed by Ezhil Durai. He also features in the lead role opposite Madhumila, while Abhinaya and Mime Gopi among others play supporting roles. The film began production during early 2016 and was released on 7 April 2017.

== Cast ==
- Ezhil Durai as Veera
- Madhumila as Anushka
- Abhinaya as Sona
- Arjunan
- Velan
- Kayal Vincent
- Vanitha Hariharan
- Divya
- Ajay Rathnam as Veera's father
- Rama as Veera's mother
- Mime Gopi as Dhamodaran
- Mahanadi Shankar
- Cool Suresh

== Production ==
Ezhil Durai chose to make his first feature film after working in almost fifty short films. Production began in mid-2016, with the film initially wrongly reported in the media to be based on the murder of a young working professional by a stalker in Chennai. Ezhil refuted the claims and revealed it was a romantic comedy, with actresses Madhumila and Abhinaya working alongside him. The film was also dubbed into Telugu as 100% Break Up soon after the original Tamil version had been completed. The makers initially targeted to release the film around Valentine's Day but postponements meant that they settled for an April release.

== Soundtrack ==
Senjittale En Kadhala

Soundtrack album by F. Raj Bharath
- Released: 31 January 2017
- Recorded: 2016
- Language: Tamil
- Label: VMS Music Records
- Producer: F. Raj Bharath

The film's music was composed by Raj Bharath, while the audio rights of the film was acquired by VMS Music Records. The album released on 31 January 2017 and featured seven songs.

Track list
No.	Title	Lyrics	Singer(s)	Length
1.	"Sillakidum"	Vaira Bharathi	Hariharasudhan, Nikhil Mathew	4:05
2.	"Kannamma"	Subramania Bharati	Sreekanth Hariharan	4:08
3.	"Finding Aai Paiyan"	GKB	L. R. Eswari, Gangai Amaran, Sakthi, Nincy Vincent	3:42
4.	"En Vaazhkkai"	Ezhil Durai	Rohit Sridhar	3:57
5.	"Play Girl"	Femcee Nicki Ziee G, R. B. Jenifer	Femcee Nicki Ziee G, R. B. Jenifer	2:22
6.	"Idhu Varai"	Vaira Bharathi	Vaishavi Sathyamoorthi	1:53
7.	"Finding Aai Paiyan - Extended version"	GKB	L. R. Eswari, Gangai Amaran, Sakthi, Nincy Vincent	4:36

== Release ==
The film opened on 7 April 2017 across Tamil Nadu alongside Mani Ratnam's Kaatru Veliyidai. The Times of India wrote "there is an earnestness about Senjittale En Kadhala that gives the film some appeal, but the filmmaking lacks zing" and that "we can sense a gap between the writing and the execution and often, this comes in the way of us fully immersing ourselves into it". A critic from The New Indian Express wrote "the writing is simple and Ezhil approaches all aspects in earnest" but "there's inconsistency in presentation and since most of the artistes are newbies, it lacks the fizz - a regular ingredient of new time writers".
