= Sabarna Anand =

Indian television and film actress (1990–2016)

- Born: 1987; Chennai, Tamil Nadu, India
- Died: 11 November 2016 (aged 29); Maduravoyal, India
- Cause of death: Suicide by cutting
- Other name: Suguna
- Occupations: Actress; Television anchor
- Years active: 2010 – 2016

Sabarna Anand (1987 – 11 November 2016) was an Indian television and film actress who appeared in Tamil and Malayalam cinema and television. She rose to fame with her role as Chithra in the Tamil film Poojai (2014), and made her television acting debut in Harichandanam (2010). She was known for her appearance in shows such as Sondha Bandham (2012), Thendral (2012), Puthu Kavithai (2013), Pasamalar (2013-2016), and Mayamohini (2014-2015).

On 13 November 2016, Sabarna was found dead in her apartment in Maduravoyal in early morning. Sabarna's neighbor called police after noticing a foul smell coming from Sabarna's apartment. When police entered Sabarna's house they found Sabarna dead and an autopsy revealed that she had died on 11 November 2016, two days prior to the body's discovery. The autopsy also suggested, which was later confirmed, that Sabarna had died from suicide by cutting.

== Career ==
Sabarna Anand was born in 1987 in Mettupalayam, coimbatore. During her college days, Sabarna tried auditioning for a role in the Malayalam serial Harichandanam and was later accepted and played the role as Honey the serial aired on Asianet in 2010. In 2014, Sabarna made her first film debut in the film Poojai alongside actors Vishal and Shruti Haasan. She later appeared in more serials such as Sondha Bandham (2012), Thendral (2012), Puthu Kavithai (2013), Pasamalar (2013-2016), Mayamohini (2014-2015).

== Filmography ==
Serials acted
year	Serial	characters	Language	Channel
2010-2012	Harichandanam	Honey	Malayalam	Asianet
2012-2013	Sondha Bandham	Reshmi	Tamil	Sun TV
2012-2014	Thendral	Ambika	Tamil	Sun TV
2013-2015	Puthu Kavithai	Khirushnaveni	Tamil	Star Vijay
2013-2016	Pasamalar	Swathi / Kumuthini	Tamil	Sun TV
2014-2015	Mayamohini	Urmila / Unnikrishnan	Malayalam	Mazhavil Manorama

=== Film appearance ===
List of performances in film
Year	Title	Role	Notes
2011	Aduthathu	Anchor	
2014	Poojai	Chithra	
