= Varunan =

2025 Tamil film by Jaayavelmurugun

- Theatrical release poster
- Directed by: Jaayavelmurugun
- Written by: Jaayavelmurugun
- Produced by: Karthick Sreedaran
- Starring: Dushyanth Jayaprakash; Gabriella Charlton; Shankarnag Vijayan; Haripriya Isai; Radha Ravi; Charan Raj
- Cinematography: S Srirama Santhosh
- Edited by: U Muthayan
- Music by: Bobo Shashi
- Production companies: Yakkai Films; Vaan Productions
- Release date: 14 March 2025
- Country: India
- Language: Tamil

Varunan is a 2025 Indian Tamil-language action thriller film written, directed by Jaayavelmurugun produced by Karthick Sreedaran's Yakkai Films and co produced by Vaan Productions . The film stars Dushyanth Jayaprakash, Gabriella Charlton, Radha Ravi, Charan Raj in the lead roles alongside an ensemble cast consisting of Shankarnag Vijayan, Haripriya Isai, Maheshwari Chanakyan, Jeeva Ravi, Arjunna Keerthivasan, Hyde Karty, Priyadharsan, Dumkan Maari and others in supporting roles.

Varunan released in theatres on 14 March 2025.

== Plot ==
Amid a global water crisis, rival distribution groups descend into violence and tyranny. As competition intensifies, their workers transform into ruthless enforcers, leading to a devastating conflict that threatens society.

== Cast ==
- Dushyanth Jayaprakash as Thillai
- Gabriella Charlton as Sittu
- Radha Ravi as Ayyavu
- Charan Raj as John
- Babu Antony as Raheem
- Shankarnag Vijayan as Dabba
- Haripriya Isai as Agni
- Maheshwari Chanakyan as Raani
- Jeeva Ravi as Muralidharan
- Redin Kingsley as Dasappan
- Kaushik S
- Arjunna Keerthivasan
- Hyde Karty
- Priyadharsan as Marudhu
- Dumkan Maari
- Sathyaraj (voiceover)

== Production ==
On 22 March 2019, coinciding with the World Water Day, actor Karthi released the poster and producer G. N. Anbu Chezhiyan revealed the title of the film Varunan, along with the tag #SaveWater. The film is written, directed and co-produced by Jaayavelmurugun under his Vaan Productions banner along with Karthick Sreedaran's Yakkai Films banner starring Dushyanth Jayaprakash in the lead role, who was last seen in Nirangal Moondru (2024) with Gabriella Charlton as the female lead alongside Radha Ravi, Charan Raj in important roles and an ensemble cast consisting of Shankarnag Vijayan, Haripriya Isai, Maheshwari Chanakyan, Jeeva Ravi, Arjunna Keerthivasan, Hyde Karty, Priyadharsan, Dumkan Maari and others in supporting roles. The trailer released on 22 February 2025 with the voice-over given by Sathyaraj as the God of Water mentioning its importance.

The technical team consists of S Srirama Santhosh as the cinematographer, U Muthayan as the editor, Bobo Shashi as the music composer, Dinesh Subbarayan as the stunt choreographer, and Paddhu as the art director.

== Music ==
Varunan

Soundtrack album by Bobo Shashi
- Genre: Feature film soundtrack
- Language: Tamil
- Producer: Bobo Shashi

Bobo Shashi chronology
Pei Kathai (2024)	Varunan (2025)

Singles from Varunan
- 1. "Kaadhale" Released: 19 July 2024; 2. "Kolaaru" Released: 23 August 2024; 3. "Awesome Feelu" Released: 17 January 2025; 4. "Achuvellam" Released: 7 March 2025; 5. "Mudiyaadhey" Released: 10 March 2025

The soundtrack and background is composed by Bobo Shashi. The first single "Kaadhale" released on 19 July 2024. The second single "Kolaaru" released on 23 August 2024. The third single "Awesome Feelu" released on 17 January 2025. The fourth single "Achuvellam" released on 7 March 2025. The fifth single "Mudiyaadhey" released on 10 March 2025.

Track listing
No.	Title	Lyrics	Singer(s)	Length
1.	"Kaadhale"	Reshman	G. V. Prakash Kumar, Saindhavi
2.	"Kolaaru"	Hyde Karty, Geetha Sabesh	Hyde Karty
3.	"Awesome Feelu"	Bobo Shashi	Bobo Shashi
4.	"Achuvellam"	Hyde Karty	Bmac Mastamaind
5.	"Mudiyaadhey"	Hyde Karty	Yuvan Shankar Raja

== Release ==
=== Theatrical ===
Varunan released in theatres on 14 March 2025.

=== Home media ===
Varunan began streaming on Aha from 1 May 2025.

== Reception ==
A critic of Maalai Malar rated the film 2.5/5 and positively reviewed the film by praising the actor's performance, story plot and the cinematography. Dinamalar critic gave 2.25/5 stars and reviewed the film by praising the theme, the performance of the lead actor's - Dushyanth Jayaprakash, Radha Ravi, Charan Raj, and Maheshwari Chanakyan, while criticizing the repetition of scenes.

Abhinav Subramanian of The Times of India gave 2/5 stars and wrote "Director Jaayavelmurugun’s Varunan - a tale of North Chennai water suppliers battling for territory plays like a greatest hits compilation of Kollywood’s most exhausted tropes.[...] In its better moments, Varunan hints at the film it could have been—a glimpse of clarity quickly muddied by convention." Akshay Kumar of Cinema Express gave 1.5/5 stars and wrote "Varunan begins on an alarming note about the commodification of water, only to settle into a routine territorial conflict story set in a slightly different milieu. Offering neither a valuable message on the water crisis nor an engaging gang rivalry, the film ultimately fails to quench our thirst for good storytelling."
