= Uma Padmanabhan =

Indian actress

- Born: Uma; Chennai, Tamil Nadu, India
- Occupations: Actress, Presenter
- Years active: 1993–Present

Uma Padmanabhan is an Indian actress and television presenter who works in Tamil-language films and television serials.

== Career ==
Uma Padmanabhan had her early education in Chennai and graduated in commerce from SIET, Nandanam. When Sun TV was founded in 1993, she applied for the job of a compere in the channel. After serving as a news reader for a short time, Uma was chosen to host the program Vanakkam Tamizhagam. She later made her acting debut with the show Micro Thodar-Oru Kudumbam Oru Ragasiyam and also appeared in the shows Veetukku Veedu Looty, Oru Thaayin Sabatham, Chellame Chellam, Vinnaithaandi Varuvaayaa Poove Poochudava, Priyamanaval and Chithi 2. Uma acted in more than 30 films in Tamil.

== Filmography ==
=== Films ===
Year	Film	Role	Notes
1998	Unnidathil Ennai Koduthen	Uma	Guest appearance
2000	Kandukondain Kandukondain	Interviewer	
2002	Yai! Nee Romba Azhaga Irukke!	Uma	
2007	Unnale Unnale	Karthik's sister	Guest appearance
2007	Sivaji	Mrs Jyothi Ramalingam	
2007	Thullal	Shruthika's mother	
2007	Sivi		
2007	Vel	Vel's and Vasu's relative	
2010	Vinnaithaandi Varuvaayaa	Mrs Sivakumar	
2010	Uthamaputhiran	Sundari Raghavan	
2010	The Thriller	Meera's mother	Malayalam film
2010	Virudhagiri	Priya's mother	
2011	Engeyum Kadhal	Kamal's mother	Special appearance in the song "Dhimu Dhimu"
2011	Aanmai Thavarael	Vetri's mother	
2011	Venghai	Rajalingam's wife	
2012	Nanban	Mrs Ramakrishnan	
2012	Oru Kal Oru Kannadi	Gayatri	
2012	Mirattal	Babloo's mother	
2012	Aarohanam	Jay	
2013	Puthagam	Divya's mother	
2013	Yaaruda Mahesh	Shiva's mother	
2013	Ragalaipuram	Velu's mother	
2013	Kalyana Samayal Saadham	Meera's mother	
2014	Marumugam		
2014	Thirudan Police	AC's wife	
2015	Thakka Thakka	Sarasu	
2016	Gethu	Herself	
2016	Oopiri	Swathi's mother-in-law	Telugu film
2016	Thozha	Swathi's mother-in-law	
2016	Uyire Uyire	Priya's mother	
2018	Yenda Thalaiyila Yenna Vekkala	Praveen's mother	
2018	Ghajinikanth	Lakshmi	
2018	Kaatrin Mozhi	Saroja Maamy	
2019	NGK	Viji	
2019	A1	Divya's Mother	
2019	Kaappaan	Mrs. Varma, Chandrakanth's wife	
2020	Taana	Shakthi's mother	
2021	Kasada Thapara		Streaming release
2021	Iruvar Ullam	Sambavi's mother	
2021	Sabhaapathy	Leelavathi	
2022	Therkathi Veeran		
2023	Theerkadarishi		
2024	Nirangal Moondru	Ilakkiya	
2025	Madha Gaja Raja	Judge	
2026	Heartin	Varalakshmi	
2026	Sandakari	Janaki; Vetri's mother	

== Television ==
Serials

Year	Title	Role	Channel
2000	Micro Thodar-Oru Kudumbam Oru Ragasiyam		Raj TV
2002–2003	Veetukku Veedu Looty	Indira	Jaya TV
2005–2006	Nilavai Pidippom	Suguna	Raj TV
2008–2009	Kasthuri		Sun TV
2016	Vinnaithaandi Varuvaayaa	Kalyani	Star Vijay
2017–2021	Poove Poochudava	Godavari	Zee Tamil
2018	Priyamanaval	Radha	Sun TV
2019	Fingertip (Web Series)	Mrs. Pramod	ZEE5
2020–2022	Chithi 2	Gowri	Sun TV
2022–2023	Iniya	Lakshmi (Extended Special Appearance)	Sun TV
2023–2024	Modhalum Kaadhalum	Kaveri	Star Vijay
2025	Malli	Advocate Devasena (Special Appearance)	Sun TV

Shows

Year	Title	Role	Channel
1990s	Vanakkam Tamizhagam	Host	Sun TV
2009	Super Singer Junior Season 2	Host	Vijay TV
2013	Oru Thaayin Sabatham	Host	Zee Tamil
2015	Chellame Chellam	Host	Jaya TV
2021	Poova Thalaiya	Contestant	Sun TV
2021	Start Music	Contestant	Star Vijay

Web Series

Year	Title	Role	Channel
2026	Heart Beat	Dr.Saranya (Chief Doctor of RK Hospital)	Jio Hotstar

Other

Year	Title	Role	Channel
2015	Batman Returns... To Chennai | The Middle Ages	Talia / Uma Aunty	Put Chutney
