= Shanthi Arvind =

Indian choreographer and actress

- Born: Shanthi; 17 February 1980 (age 46); Chennai, Tamil Nadu, India
- Other names: Metti Oli Shanthi; Santhi
- Occupations: Actress; Dancer; choreographer
- Years active: 1990–2025
- Known for: Metti Oli
- Children: 2

Shanthi Arvind (born 17 February 1980), also known as Disco Santhi, is an Indian dancer and actress who works in Tamil-language films and television. She began her career at the age of ten in the film Kizhakku Vaasal (1990) as a dancer. She is also known for being the title song dancer in the serial Metti Oli.

Shanthi made her television debut in the 2002 television series Metti Oli, which proved to be a major breakout role in her career, she later earned her self the name of "Metti Oli Shanthi" after her appearance in the show. She also appeared in other television serials as an actress such as Kannana Kanne, Muthuzhagu, Ilakkiya and Kula Deivam.

== Filmography ==
=== Television ===
Year	Title	Role	Channel	Notes
2002	Metti Oli	Title song dancer	Sun TV	
2015–2018	Kula Deivam	Mangalasundari	Sun TV	Debut as actress
2017	Super Challenge	Guest	Sun TV	TV show
2018–2021	Eeramana Rojave	Maragatham and Thangam	Star Vijay	
2018–2020	Kalyana Parisu	Lakshmi Arjun	Sun TV	
2020	Suryavamsam	Special appearance	Zee Tamil	
2020	Anbe Vaa	Choreographer	Sun TV	
2021–2022	Kannana Kanne	Renuka	Sun TV	
2021	Ettam Arivu	Herself	Sun TV	
2021–2024	Muthazhagu	Thilaga	Star Vijay	
2022	Oo Solriya Oo Oohm Solriya	Guest	Star Vijay	
2022	Anda Ka Kasam	Guest	Star Vijay	
2022	Vanakkam Tamizha	Guest	Sun TV	
2022	Poova Thalaya	Guest	Sun TV	
2022-2023	Bigg Boss Tamil Season 6	Contestant	Star Vijay	Evicted Day 14
2023	Bigg Boss Kondattam	Herself	Star Vijay	
2023	Tamizha Tamizha	Herself	Zee Tamil	
2023	Kannedhirey Thondrinal	Raja Rajeshwari	Kalaignar TV	
2023–2025	Ilakkiya	Dhakshayini	Sun TV	
2023–2025	Sakthivel: Theeyaai Oru Theeraa Kaadhal	Paramsothy	Star Vijay	
2026	Sandhya Raagam	Herself	Zee Tamil	

=== Film ===
Year	Film	Role	Notes
1990	Kizhakku Vaasal	Dancer in Thadukki Thadukki song	Debut as dancer
1999	Jodi	Dancer in Kadhal Kaditham song	
1999	Ninaivirukkum Varai	Dancer in Tirupathi Ezhumalai Venkatesa song	
2000	Kandukondain Kandukondain	Dancer in Smayiyai song	
2000	Pennin Manathai Thottu	Dancer in Naa Saltu kotta	
2000	Rhythm	Dancer in Thaniye Song	
2001	Minnale	Dancer in Venmathi song	
2001	Badri	Dancer in King of Chennai song	
2002	Gemini	Dancer in O Podu	
2003	Pakalppooram	Dancer in Hey Shingaari song	Malayalam Film
2003	Whistle	Dancer in Kiruka Kadal Kirukaa	
2003	Anbe Sivam	Dancer in Naatukkoru Seithi	
2023	Leo	Shanmugam's Wife	Debut as Actress
