= Puthu Kavithai =

Tamil language soap opera

- Genre: Action; Melodrama; Romance
- Based on: Mann Kee Awaaz Pratigya
- Directed by: D. Parthasarathy
- Starring: Maheshwari Chanakyan; Dinesh Gopalasamy
- Theme music composer: Balaji
- Country of origin: India
- Original language: Tamil
- No. of seasons: 1 / 2
- No. of episodes: 375

Production
- Producer: D. Parthasarathy
- Cinematography: Vasant
- Editors: PM achuthan & Pandimurugan
- Camera setup: Multi-camera
- Running time: approx. 20-22 minutes per episode
- Production company: Rightfeel Productions

Original release
- Network: Star Vijay
- Release: 16 December 2013 – 29 May 2015

Related
- Sakthivel: Theeyaai Oru Theeraa Kaadhal

Puthu Kavithai is a 2013 Tamil-language soap opera starring Maheshwari Chanakyan, Dinesh Gopalasamy. It aired on Vijay TV from 16 December 2013 to 29 May 2015 for 375 episodes. It was produced by Rightfeel Productions and D. Parthasarathy and was directed by D. Parthasarathy. It is a story of a woman (Maheswari) who will go to any lengths to fight for her rights.

== Plot ==
The story takes place in a small town in Rameswaram. Kavya and Divya are Ramanathan's children. He leads a traditional and respectable family in the town, and as a good father intends to give a good education to both of his daughters irrespective of the family condition. Meanwhile, Dhanush, who is of no use in the town at all and is a nuisance, develops a secret admiration for Kavya. Dhanush convinces himself that Kavya should be his life partner.

== Cast ==
- Maheshwari Chanakyan as Kavya
- Dinesh Gopalasamy as Dhanush
- Feroz Khan as Sethu, Dhanush's elder brother
- Shalini as Pavithra
- Srilatha as Kavya, Divya's mother
- Sabarna Anand as Krishnaveni, younger sister of Dhanush, Aravind's wife
- Raviraj as Aravind. Kavya's elder brother, Krishnaveni's husband
- Swetha Venkat as Divya. Kavya's younger sister
- Karthi as Rukku
- Sumangali as Bhagyam, Aravind's mother
- Udhay as Arjun
- Usha Elizabeth as Andal (villain), Dhanush, Rukku and Krishnaveni's mother
- Vatsala Rajagopal as Kavya, Aravind and Divya's grandmother

== Spin-off ==
Due to the show's initial success in later years, Star Vijay decided to make a spin-off titled Sakthivel: Theeyaai Oru Theeraa Kaadhal, which premiered on 4 December 2023. The story revolves around Sakthi, a girl with unwavering principles, and Velan, a rogue who works under his father's helm. Whether the pair can find love and marry forms the plot on the story.

== Adaptations ==
Language	Title	Original release	Network(s)	Last aired	Notes
Hindi	Mann Kee Awaaz Pratigya मन की आवाज प्रतिज्ञा	7 December 2009	StarPlus	27 October 2012	Original
Kannada	Krishna Rukmini ಕೃಷ್ಣ ರುಕ್ಮಿಣಿ	2 May 2011	Star Suvarna	8 March 2013	Remake
Marathi	Devyani देवयानी	19 March 2012	Star Pravah	28 May 2016	Remake
Tamil	Puthu Kavithai புது கவிதை	18 December 2013	Star Vijay	29 May 2015	Remake
Malayalam	Gouri Shankaram ഗൗരിശങ്കരം	3 July 2023	Asianet	27 December 2024	Remake
Kannada	Gowri Shankara ಗೌರಿ ಶಂಕರ	13 November 2023	Star Suvarna	Ongoing	Remake
Tamil	Sakthivel: Theeyaai Oru Theeraa Kaadhal சக்திவேல்: தீயாய் ஒரு தீராக்காதல்	4 December 2023	Star Vijay	Ongoing	Remake
Telugu	Satyabhama సత్యభామ	18 December 2023	Star Maa	Ongoing	Remake

== Awards and nominations ==
Year	Award	Category	Recipient	Role	Result
2014	Vijay Television Awards	Favourite Actor Female	Maheswari	Kavya	Nominated
2014	Vijay Television Awards	Favourite Supporting Actor Male	Raviraj	Aravind	Nominated
2015	Vijay Television Awards	Favourite Actor Male	Dinesh	Dhanush	Nominated
2015	Vijay Television Awards	Favourite Actor Female	Maheswari	Kavya	Nominated
2015	Vijay Television Awards	Favourite Screen Pair	Dinesh & Maheswari	Dhanush & Kavya	Nominated
2015	Vijay Television Awards	Favourite Fiction Series			Nominated
2015	Vijay Television Awards	Favourite Supporting Actor Male	Ferosekhan	Sethu	Nominated
2015	Vijay Television Awards	Favourite Supporting Actor Female	Saberna	Khirushnaveni	Nominated
2015	Vijay Television Awards	Best Mamiyar-Fiction	Sri Latha	Meenatchi	Nominated
2015	Vijay Television Awards	Best Family	Puthu Kavithai Family		Nominated
