= Madhumila =

Sri Lankan born Tamil actress, TV anchor, and model (born 1988)

- Born: Jaffna, Sri Lanka
- Other names: Mathumila, Lakshmi
- Occupations: Actress, TV Anchor and Model
- Years active: 2012–2020
- Website: https://www.instagram.com/officialmathumila/

Mathumila (born 23 May 1988), also written as Madhumila, is a Sri Lankan-born Indian Tamil actress, TV anchor, and model. She started her career as an anchor in 2012 on Makkal TV and made her acting debut in the Tamil television serial Office, which garnered her fame. She has also appeared in some well known films such as Poojai, Romeo Juliet, and Mapla Singam.

In 2014, Mathumila won the Vijay Television Award for Favourite Find for her role as Lakshmi in the serial Office.

== Personal life ==
Mathumila got married in 2017 and now resides in Canada with her husband. They have one child, born in 2020.

== Filmography ==
List of film performances
| Year | Film | Role | Notes |
|---|---|---|---|
| 2014 | Poojai | Selvi | |
| 2015 | Romeo Juliet | Priya | |
| 2016 | Mapla Singam | Vinodhini | |
| 2017 | Senjittale En Kadhala | Anushka | |
| 2017 | Sangili Bungili Kadhava Thorae | Sandhiya | |
| 2018 | Nenjamellam Kadhal | Saranya | |
| 2024 | Emakku Thozhil Romance | Sharanya | |

List of television performances
| Year | Serials | Role | Notes |
|---|---|---|---|
| 2012 | Makkal TV | Self | |
| 2013-2014 | Office | Lakshmi | Vijay Television Award for Favourite Find |
| 2013-2014 | Thayumanavan | Subha | |
| 2013-2014 | Agni Paravai | Ammu | |
| 2015–2016 | Kitchen Super Star (season 4) | Self | Finalist |
| 2016-2016 | Achcham Thavir | Self | Winner |
| 2016-2017 | Vinnaithaandi Varuvaayaa | Abirami (Abi) | |
| 2020 | Aanmai (Youtube short film) | Viji | |
