= Vinnaithaandi Varuvaayaa (TV series) =

- விண்ணைத்தாண்டி வருவாயா
- Genre: Soap opera; Musical
- Written by: Vetri Vel
- Story by: Rajpiravu
- Directed by: Sundar K. Vijayan
- Starring: Vikraman Radhakrishnan; Madhumila; Uma Padmanabhan; Uma Riyaz Khan; Divya
- Theme music composer: Revathi P.V
- Country of origin: India
- Original language: Tamil
- No. of episodes: 29

Production
- Producer: R. Sarathkumar
- Camera setup: Multi-camera
- Running time: approx. 20-22 minutes per episode
- Production company: I Pictures

Original release
- Network: Star Vijay
- Release: 3 October – 4 November 2016

Vinnaithaandi Varuvaayaa (Tamil: விண்ணைத்தாண்டி வருவாயா) is a 2016 Tamil musical drama television miniseries starring Vikraman Radhakrishnan, Madhumila, Uma Padmanabhan and Uma Riyaz Khan. The show premiered on 3 October 2016 and aired on Mondays to Saturday at 7:30PM (IST) on Star Vijay, starting from 31 October 2016, the show shifted to aired at 10:00PM (IST) and ended with 29 episodes. It was produced by Tamil film actor R. Sarathkumar and directed by Sundar K. Vijayan.

== Cast ==
=== Main cast ===
- Madhumila as Abirami (Abi)
- Vikraman Radhakrishnan as Vikram

Supporting Cast

- Divya Ganesh as Kani
- Uma Riyaz Khan as Gayathiri
- Uma Padmanabhan as Kalyani
- Senu
- Parthan Siva as Vishnu Varthan
- Anuradha Krishnamurthy
- George Vishnu
- Raani as Malavika
- Sambhavi as Varshini
- Sathiy Sai
- Karthik
- Sivaji Manohar as Jakku
- Puviarasu

=== Title song ===
It was written by lyricist K. Cho. It was sung by Mayanathi Ananthu, Anand Aravindakshan and Revathi P.V.

=== Soundtrack ===
Tracklist
No.	Title	Length
1.	"Vinnaithaandi Varuvaayaa (Title Song)"
2.	"Netru Aval Iruntha (நேற்று அவள் இருந்த)"	2:00
3.	"Nee Varuvayaa (நீ வருவாயா)"	2:00
4.	"Amma Unnale (அம்மா உன்னாலே)"	2:05
5.	"Malargal Ketten (மலர்கள் கேட்டேன்)"	1:10
