= Writer (film) =

2021 Indian film

- Theatrical release poster
- Directed by: Franklin Jacob
- Written by: Franklin Jacob
- Produced by: Pa. Ranjith; Abhayanand Singh; Piiyush Singh; Aditi Anand
- Starring: Samuthirakani; Hari Krishnan
- Cinematography: Pratheep Kaliraja
- Edited by: Manigandan Sivakumar
- Music by: Govind Vasantha
- Production companies: Neelam Productions; Golden Ratio Films; Little Red Car Films; Jetty Productions
- Release date: 24 December 2021
- Running time: 147 minutes
- Country: India
- Language: Tamil

Writer is a 2021 Indian Tamil-language crime thriller film written and directed by debutant Franklin Jacob and produced by Neelam Productions in association with Golden Ratio Films, Little Red Car Films and Jetty Productions. The film stars Samuthirakani and Hari Krishnan. The music is composed by Govind Vasantha with cinematography by Pratheep Kaliraja and editing by Manigandan Sivakumar. The film was released in theatres on 24 December 2021 and received positive reviews from critics.

The film is about a writer at a police station who gets trapped in an illegal custody case involving an innocent Ph.D. student.

== Plot ==
A new recruit, police constable Arivazhagan, reports for duty at the Tiruverumbur police station in Tiruchirappalli, where he is mentored by head constable Thangaraj, the station writer. Thangaraj is a bigamist, forced into a second marriage with a much younger woman to produce an heir. He has also initiated—and continues to fight—a case seeking the formation of a police union to represent lower-rank officers. This angers the police inspector, who punishes him by transferring him to the Thiruvallikeni police station in Chennai.

Once in Chennai, Thangaraj is relegated to menial station duties. He reconnects with Raja—an ex-convict he knows from an earlier case—who does odd jobs and lives on the station premises. On his first day, Thangaraj is tasked with guarding Devakumar, a PhD student illegally detained in a nearby marriage hall. Deva attempts to escape but is caught by Thangaraj and the hall manager. The station staff refuse to disclose any case details, and Inspector Perumal, along with head constable Manickam, forces Deva to sign a set of documents.

Deva's location is constantly changed, and Deputy Commissioner Trivedi Sharma is shown to be involved in the case—later revealed to be previously acquainted with Thangaraj. Raja and Thangaraj watch over Deva, who tearfully recounts his story to Raja. In a flashback, Deva, from a backward community, lives in Thirukkattupalli near Trichy with his elder brother Xavier, sister-in-law, and their son. After a family spat, he returns to Chennai, only to be detained by the police, who also seize his cellphone. While trying to persuade a senior Trichy journalist to cover the police-union case, Thangaraj inadvertently reveals the illegal detention, which the journalist publishes as a scoop.

Sharma becomes livid and has Thangaraj write a crime scene to implicate Deva, unaware that it was Thangaraj who leaked the story. Deva gets implicated as a Naxalite and is arrested. Thangaraj feels guilty for causing this. When Xavier comes to Chennai to meet his brother, Thangaraj explains the seriousness of the situation and asks him to approach lawyer Marudhamuthu, to help out in the case. Marudhamuthu learns that the police are very secretive about the case and is not allowed an audience with Deva.

Sharma, Perumal, and Manickam inquire Devakumar about his interest in some "details" and beat him up. Marudhamuthu learns of this, rushes back to the police station with Xavier, and manages to convince Perumal to allow Xavier to meet his brother. Thangaraj reveals to Marudhamuthu about his role in Deva's arrest and secretly smuggles a phone into Deva's cell to allow him to speak with Marudhamuthu. It is then revealed that Deva was a PhD student of sociology from Madras University, who was researching the mental health of police officers and the increasing numbers of suicidal deaths in the police force. A lawyer Anwar, in Saidapet court, filed an RTI to get him the related information for his thesis.

In another flashback, it is revealed that Sharma had rejected three applications for the horse riding team of Tamil Nadu Police force, one of which belonged to Saranya. She is told by an officer that she was rejected because of her caste certificate. When Saranya questions this, she is forced to do stable maintenance duty by Sharma. One day, when Sharma visits the stables, she adamantly rides a horse in front of him, which angers him. He beats her up badly presumably to death, and is written off that she committed suicide soon after.

Thangaraj becomes remorseful after hearing this and enlists Arivazhagan's help to let Deva escape and surrender in a court, under a different case, thus escaping the police officers who want him silenced. Crossing many hurdles, Thangaraj helps Deva run away.

A few months later, Thangaraj is shown to be jailed. In a letter to Arivazhagan, he reveals what happened after Devakumar escaped. Thangaraj is ambushed by one of his pursuers and is hospitalized. Sharma, Perumal, and Manickam traced and abducted Deva, who is forcefully shot dead by a guilt-ridden Thangaraj. Later, Sharma, Perumal, and Manickam try and convince Thangaraj to write off the case as an encounter of a criminal trying to escape. Thangaraj refuses to cooperate and threatening to expose them, leading to their implication. When Sharma threatens to shoot him, Thangaraj snatches the gun and shoots Sharma dead in front of a shocked Perumal and Manickam. Thangaraj asks forgiveness from Xavier for causing his brother's death. After reading the letter, Arivazhagan is shown to continue fighting the police union case, heeding Thangaraj's request.

== Cast ==
- Samuthirakani as Head Constable Thangaraj
- Hari Krishnan as Devakumar
- Kavin Jay Babu as Deputy Commissioner Trivedi Sharma
- Subramaniam Siva as Xavier, Deva's brother
- Ineya as Saranya
- Dileepan as Arivazhagan
- Anthony as Raja
- G. M. Sundar as Advocate Marudhamuthu
- Kumareson
- Maheshwari Chanakyan as Thangaraj's second wife
- Lizzie Antony as Amudha, Thangaraj's first wife
- Bose Venkat as Tiruverumbur Inspector
- Kavitha Bharathy as Perumal, Triplicane Inspector

== Soundtrack ==
Writer

Soundtrack album by Govind Vasantha
- Released: 2021
- Genre: Feature film soundtrack
- Length: 9:18
- Language: Tamil
- Label: Think Music

Govind Vasantha chronology
Madhuram (2021)	Writer (2021)	Hey Sinamika (2022)

The soundtrack and score is composed by Govind Vasantha and the album featured two songs. The audio rights were acquired by Think Music.

Track listing
No.	Title	Lyrics	Singer(s)	Length
1.	"Adi Adi"	Yugabharathi	Anthakudi Ilayaraja, Lakshmi Chandru, Ananda Priyan, Jesurani	05:26
2.	"Kaanal Neeraai"	Muthuvel	Pradeep Kumar	03:52

== Release ==
The film was released in theatres on 24 December 2021 and opened to positive reviews.

=== Home media ===
The post-theatrical streaming rights of the film were bought by Aha and will be premiered on 11 February 2022. The satellite rights of the film were sold to Colors Tamil.

== Reception ==
Ashameera Aiyappan of Firstpost rated the film with 3.5/5 stars, stating that, "Writer depicts an honest policeman’s mental health struggle like no other film- the introspection is real and honest." Behindwoods rated the film with 3/5 stars, stating that "Writer is a solid political film, that shows the weaker side of police department." Logesh Balachandran of The Times of India gave a rating of 3 out on 5 and wrote, "Writer definitely has honest intentions and is watchable for the subject it has dealt with." Sudhir Srinivasan of Cinema Express gave a rating of 3 out on 5 and wrote, "the film has many interesting ideas, but not quite a riveting film."

Sify rated the film with 3/5 stars, stating that "Writer sends a much-needed message to the Government and the superior officers in the Police Force. Will they listen?" and gave the verdict as an "honest take on the corrupt police department". Haricharan Pudipeddi of Hindustan Times stated that, "Writer is the kind of film that goes beyond the meaning of entertainment, and it leaves you enlightened. It makes you question the very department that’s meant to protect us and be at our service." Srinivasa Ramanujam of The Hindu wrote, "With the drama-thriller, debutant director Franklin Jacob joins the long list of exciting Tamil filmmakers to watch out for." Bharathy Singaravel of The News Minute stated that, "Releasing in mainstream venues, in the same theatres that run big budget cop films to full houses, this film helps spread a political language tuned to the systemic failures in this country. Writer is a film you don’t want to miss."
