= Devmanus 2 =

2021 Indian Marathi language crime series

- Genre: Thriller; Crime
- Based on: Santosh Pol
- Screenplay by: Swapnil Gangurde
- Directed by: Raju Sawant; Amit Sawardekar
- Starring: See below
- Theme music composer: Rohit Nagbhide
- Country of origin: India
- Original language: Marathi
- No. of seasons: 3
- No. of episodes: 236

Production
- Producers: Shweta Shinde; Sanjay Khambe
- Production location: Satara, Maharashtra
- Cinematography: Sachin Patekar
- Running time: 22 minutes
- Production company: Vajra Production

Original release
- Network: Zee Marathi
- Release: 19 December 2021 – 10 September 2022

Related
- Devmanus; Devmanus – Madhla Adhyay

Devmanus 2 (transl. God Figure 2) is an Indian Marathi language crime thriller television series which aired on Zee Marathi. The show premiered from 19 December 2021, replacing Ti Parat Aaliye. It is produced by Shweta Shinde and directed by Raju Sawant under the banner of Vajra Production. It starred Kiran Gaikwad and Asmita Deshmukh in lead roles.

== Series ==
Season	Episodes	Originally Broadcast	
Season	Episodes	First aired	Last aired
1	301	31 August 2020	15 August 2021
2	236	19 December 2021	10 September 2022
3	present	2 June 2025	Ongoing

== Plot ==
Devi Singh, who wreaked havoc and destroyed the lives of many innocent people, is back with a vengeance, with a new target and a plan deadlier than before.

== Cast ==
=== Main ===
- Kiran Gaikwad as Dr. Ajitkumar Chandrakant Dev / Natvar Singh
- Asmita Deshmukh as Sagarika Babu Patil / Sagarika Ajitkumar Dev (Dimple)

=== Recurring ===
Patil family

- Anjali Joglekar as Mangal Babu Patil - Dimple's mother
- Ankush Mandekar as Babu Rangrao Patil - Dimple's father
- Viral Mane as Shubhankar Babu Patil (Tonya) - Dimple's brother
- Rukmini Sutar as Saru Patil (Aaji) - Dimple's grandmother
- Pushpa Chaudhari as Vandi - Dimple's aunt

Others

- Milind Shinde as Martand Jamkar
- Snehal Shidam as Mrs. Jamkar
- Nilesh Gaware as Namdev Jadhav (Namya)
- Kiran Dange as Bajarang Patil (Bajya)
- Ravina Gogawale as Ravina Bajrang Patil
- Namantar Kamble as Vinchya
- Rutuja Kanojiya as Pinky
- Priya Gautam as Saloni
- Shivani Ghatge as Neelam Jaysingh
- Nivya Chemburkar as Madhumati
- Vaishnavi Kalyankar as Sonu
- Tejaswini Lonari as Devyani Janardan Gaikwad
- Vinod Pulavale as Janardan Gaikwad
- Sandhya Manik as Anandi
- Swara Patil as Chinu
- Pankaj Chavan as Devyani's assistant

== Reception ==
=== Special episodes ===
1 hour

1. 19 December 2021
2. 26 December 2021
3. 9 January 2022
4. 20 February 2022
5. 6 March 2022
6. 17 April 2022
7. 5 June 2022

2 hours

- 17 July 2022
