= Aditi Sarangdhar =

Indian actress

- Born: 16 October 1981 (age 45); Mumbai, Maharashtra, India
- Occupation: Actress
- Years active: 2000–present
- Spouse: Suhas Revandekar (m. 2013)

Aditi Sarangdhar is an Indian actress. She worked in many Marathi movies and TV shows. She is famous for the role of Rama Chaudhary in serial Vadalvaat and Malvika Khanvilkar in serial Yeu Kashi Tashi Me Nandayla.

== Early life ==
Aditi was born to Dr. Dipak and Shaila Sarangdhar, a middle-class family from Kalyan. She is a graduate from Ramnarain Ruia College, Mumbai. On 25 May 2013, Aditi married Suhas Revandekar.

== Career ==
Sarangdhar performed in Nishikant Kamat's experimental play Litmus, where she was spotted. Kanchan Adhikari offered her the role of Damini. She acted in the female version of Devendra Pem's EAll The Best' and then Zee Marathi's Vadalvaat.

In the two-act play, Aditi portrays call-girl "Shabbo". The story revolves around two characters and two incidents. She played shades of Radha successfully. Rajan Tamhane directed this play and played two short term characters. Aditi secured Zee Gaurav and MaTa Sanman for this role.

Aditi played the central role of Rama Chaudhary in a TV show Vadalvaat on Zee Marathi. This role brought her fame and recognition across Marathi households.

Hou De Jarasa Ushir is a movie directed by Wasim Maner. Aditi portrays Monali Mohite. The movie competed for an Oscar nomination.

== Filmography ==
=== Films ===
Year	Films	Director	Role	Ref.
2004	Akalpit	Ramesh More		
2006	Divasen Divas	Gajendra Ahire		
2007	Natha Pure Ata	Mrs. Lata Ashok Jadhav		
2008	Uladhaal	Aditya Sarpotdar	Neha	
2009	Chingi	Raaj Israni		
2010	Tee Ratra	Viju Mane	Rajni Deshmukh	
2011	Paach Naar Ek Bejaar	Vijay Satghare		
2011	Tuch Khari Gharachi Laxmi	Vijay Bhanu		
2012	Dhating Dhingana	Mandar Devsthali		
2012	Aik	Pratik Kadam	Aditi Jadhav	
2012	Kay Karu N Kasa Karu	Vinay A. Laad		
2013	Mohar	Vijay Patkar	Tainu	
2013	Mandali Tumchyasathi Kay Pan	Anil Surve		
2013	Aakant	Mansing Pawar		
2013	Sutradhar	Pratik Kadam	Vaijayanthi	
2013	Hou De Jarasa Ushir	Wasim Maner	Monali Mohite	
2013	Navra Maza Bhavra	Kamalakar Gunjal		
2016	Majha Naav Shivaji	Pranita Pawar	Namrata	
2024	Bai Ga	Pandurang Jadhav		

=== Television ===
Year	Title	Role	Ref.
2000	Damini		
2003-2007	Vadalvaat	Rama Chaudhari	
2008	Katha Sarita	Episodic role	
2009	Abhilasha	Janu	
2010	Active Wheel WOW	Guest appearance	
2011-2016	Lakshya	Saloni Deshmukh	
2011	Fu Bai Fu	Contestant	
2012	Dholkichya Talavar	Contestant	
2014	Bheti Laagi Jeeva	Surrogate mother	
2015	Majhe Man Tujhe Zhale	Swarada	
2017	Comedychi GST Express	Contestant	
2018-2020	H.M. Bane T.M. Bane	Tulika Bane	
2020	Swarajyajanani Jijamata		
2021-2022	Yeu Kashi Tashi Me Nandayla	Malvika Khanvilkar	
2022	Nave Lakshya	Saloni Deshmukh	
2023	Nava Gadi Nava Rajya	Mrs. Barve	
2024	Satvya Mulichi Satavi Mulgi	Trinayna Goddess	
2025-2026	Muramba	Irawati Mukadam	
2026–present	Sanai Chaughade	Tejaswini Khanolkar	

== Stage work ==
Year	Title	Director	Notes
2000	Litmus	Sameer Limaye	Debut play
2000	Manjula	Nishikant Kamat	
2008	Aga Aga Degree	Mangesh Satpute	
2013	Proposal	Rajan Tamhane	
2015	All The Best	Devendra Pem	
2015	Indrakshi	Sahyadri Media Entertainment	
2015	Graceful	Rajan Tamhane	
2023	Charcha Tar Honarch	Hemant Edlabadkar	
2024	Mastermind	Vijay Kenkre	

== Awards and nominations ==
Year	Work	Award	Name of Category	Result	Ref.
2000	Manjula	Sawai Inter-College-Drama Competition	Best Actress	Won	
2004	Vadalvaat	Zee Marathi Utsav Natyancha Awards	Best Actress	Nominated	
2004	Vadalvaat	Zee Marathi Utsav Natyancha Awards	Best Character - Female	Won	
2005	Vadalvaat	Zee Marathi Utsav Natyancha Awards	Best Actress	Won	
2005	Vadalvaat	Zee Marathi Utsav Natyancha Awards	Best Character - Female	Won	
2006	Vadalvaat	Zee Marathi Utsav Natyancha Awards	Best Actress	Nominated	
2006	Vadalvaat	Zee Marathi Utsav Natyancha Awards	Best Character - Female	Won	
2013	Proposal	Maharashtra Times Sanman Awards	Best Actress in Play	Won	
2013	Proposal	Zee Natya Gaurav Puraskar	Best Actress - Play	Won	
2013	Proposal	Maharashtra State Government Commercial Theater Competition Award	Best Actress	Won	
2021	Yeu Kashi Tashi Me Nandayla	Zee Marathi Utsav Natyancha Awards	Best Character - Female	Nominated	
2021	Yeu Kashi Tashi Me Nandayla	Zee Marathi Utsav Natyancha Awards	Best Negative Role - Female	Won	
