= Devmanus =

Devmanus may refer to:

- Devmanus (TV series), an Indian TV series that premiered in 2020
- Devmanus 2, sequel of 2020 TV series that premiered in 2021
- Devmanus Madhla Adhyay, prequel of 2021 TV series premiered in 2025
- Devmanus (film), a 2025 Indian film
