= Milind Shinde =

Indian actor, director, writer and producer

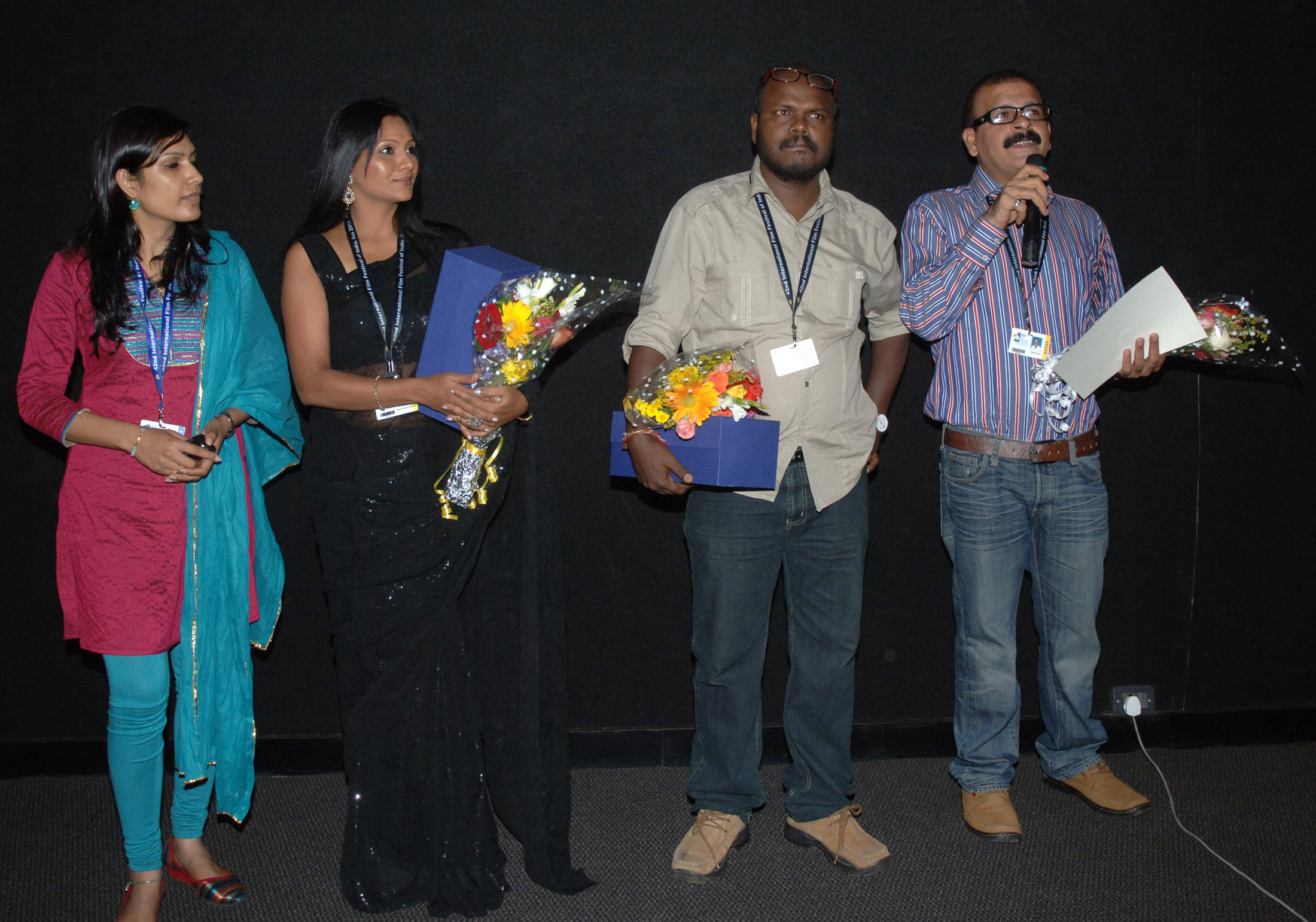
- Milind Shinde, IFFI (2011)
- Born: 17 March 1970 (age 56); Ahmednagar
- Other name: Milind
- Occupations: Film Actor, Director, Producer, Writer
- Years active: 20
- Known for: Actor, Director, Producer also writer
- Notable work: The winner of PIFF is the 21st Pune International Film Festival. He is actor, produced a film called "MADAAR" in 2022.
- Spouse: Prajkta Vilas

Milind Shinde is an Indian actor, director, writer and producer who works in Marathi, Kannada and Hindi films. He started his career with Girish Karnad's Hindi television serials and Kannada films. He is well known for his portrayal in the Marathi film Natrang. He has acted, directed and produced Marathi films.

Milind Shinde has also directed the Marathi movie Re Raya in 2018, in which Bhushan Pradhan plays main lead.

== Filmography ==
Year	Movie	Character
2025	Jay Bhim Panther	
2025	Reelstar	
2024	Parampara	Shripati
2023	Ghaath	Raghunath
2023	Phulrani	Hanmya
2022	Har Har Mahadev	Siddi Johar
2021	Jayanti	Ashok Mali
2018	Re Raya	Director
2017	Bhikari	Basap Anna, Goon
2017	Shyamchi Shala	
2016	Majhi Tapasya	Ramya (Ramesh)
2015	Shasan	
2013	Touring Talkies	-
2013	Naach Tuzach Lagin Hay	-
2012	Baboo Band Baaja	-
2010	Natrang	-
2010	Paradh	-
2007	Jau Tithe Khau	-
2006	Bayo	
2003	Not Only Mrs. Raut	
-	Dombari	-
-	Veda Prem	-

=== Television ===
Year	Title	Channel	Role
2003-2007	Vadalvaat	Zee Marathi	Shrikant Vazalvar
2008-2010	Agnihotra	Star Pravah	Krishna Gurav
2012-2014	Tu Tithe Me	Zee Marathi	Dada Holkar
2013-2015	Gandh Phulancha Gela Sangun	ETV Marathi	Waman Shirke
2016-2017	Saraswati	Colors Marathi	Bhujang
2017	Balpan Dega Deva	Colors Marathi	
2020-2021	Aai Majhi Kalubai	Sony Marathi	Virat Guruji
2021	Majhya Navaryachi Bayko	Zee Marathi	Gotya Sheth
2021	Sukh Mhanje Nakki Kay Asta!	Star Pravah	Bhairu Pahilwan
2021	Tujhya Ishkacha Naadkhula	Star Pravah	Inspector Ghanekar
2022	Devmanus 2	Zee Marathi	Inspector Jamkar
2022–2023	Rang Majha Vegla	Star Pravah	Lawyer Ghadge
2023	36 Guni Jodi	Zee Marathi	Purushottam Gudpallivar
2023	Gatha Navnathanchi	Sony Marathi	
2024–2025	Constable Manju	Sun Marathi	Tatya Saheb
2025–present	Inspector Manju	Sun Marathi	Tatya Saheb
2025–present	Devmanus – Madhla Adhyay	Zee Marathi	Martand Jamkar
