= Nitish Chavan =

Indian actor (born 1990)

- Born: Nitish Bhagwan Chavan; 7 July 1990 (age 35); Satara, Maharashtra, India
- Occupation: Actor
- Years active: 2017–present
- Known for: Lagira Zala Ji, Lakhat Ek Aamcha Dada

Nitish Chavan (born 7 July 1990) is an Indian Marathi film and television actor known for Lagira Zala Ji.

== Career ==
Nitish Chavan is from Satara, Maharashtra, began his acting career with serial Lagira Zala Ji, marks his first collaboration with Shivani Baokar, later they collaborated in the songs "Khulach Zalo Ga" under Everest Marathi, "Chahul" under Marathi Music Town label.

In 2022 he made his feature film debut with Soyrik, and played lead roles in Majnu, Har Har Mahadev and Jeta same year. In 2023 alongside Chinmay Udgirkar and Sayali Sanjeev in Urmi, he was also featured in Shreyash Jadhav's Phakaat.

== Filmography ==
=== Films ===
Key
†	Denotes films that have not yet been released

All movies are in Marathi, unless mentioned.

Year	Film	Role	Notes	Ref(s)
2022	Soyrik			
2022	Majnu	Sagar		
2022	Har Har Mahadev	Dhanaji Mhaskar	Released in five languages	
2022	Jeta	Sanjay		
2023	Urmi			
2023	Phakaat	Major Mohan		
TBA	Chatur Chor †	TBA	Production	

=== Television ===
Year	Title	Role	Notes	Ref(s)
2017–2019	Lagira Zala Ji	Ajinkya "Ajya" Shinde	Debut	
2024–2025	Lakhat Ek Aamcha Dada	Suryakant "Dada" Jagtap		

=== Music video ===
Year	Title	Singer(s)	Ref(s)
2019	"Khulach Zalo Ga"	Aishwarya Malgave	
2020	"Chahul"	Vijay Bhate	
2020	"Punha Ekda Garud Bharari Gheu"	Jeevan Marathe, Kavita Ram, Rajeshwari Pawar, Krisha Chitnis	
2020	"Barsu De"	Abhishek Telang, Sayli Kamble	
2021	"Vedya Manala"	Manish Kamble, Sonali Sonawane	
2022	"Lajtana"	Pushpak Pardeshi	
2022	"Tula Pahun"	Niranjan Pedgaonkar	
