= Lakhat Ek Aamcha Dada =

2024 Indian Marathi language TV series

- Genre: Drama
- Written by: Swapnil Chavan; Vishal Kadam
- Directed by: Kiran Dalvi
- Starring: See below
- Country of origin: India
- Original language: Marathi
- No. of episodes: 428

Production
- Producers: Shweta Shinde; Sanjay Khambe
- Production locations: Satara, Maharashtra
- Camera setup: Multi-camera
- Running time: 22 minutes
- Production company: Vajra Production

Original release
- Network: Zee Marathi
- Release: 8 July 2024 – 4 October 2025

Related
- Anna

Lakhat Ek Aamcha Dada (transl. Our Brother is One in a Million) is an Indian Marathi language TV series which aired from 8 July 2024 on Zee Marathi. It is an official remake of Zee Tamil's TV series Anna. It stars Nitish Chavan and Disha Pardeshi in lead roles. Later, Mrunmayee Gondhalekar replaced Disha as lead actress.

It is produced by Shweta Shinde and Sanjay Khambe under the banner of Vajra Production. It aired curtain raiser episode for character introduction on 7 July 2024. It aired its last episode on 4 October 2025 completing 428 episodes.

== Plot ==
The heart-warming tale of Surya-aka-Dada, who devotes his life to ensuring his four sisters get married into caring and wealthy families.

== Cast ==
=== Main ===
- Nitish Chavan as Suryakant Shankar Jagtap (Dada)
  - Atharva Gade as child Surya
- Disha Pardeshi / Mrunmayee Gondhalekar as Tulja Jalindar Nimbalkar / Tulja Suryakant Jagtap
  - Ananya Tambe as child Tulja

=== Recurring ===
Nimbalkar family

- Girish Oak as Jalindar Nimbalkar (Daddy)
- Sumedha Datar as Shalan Jalindar Nimbalkar
- Kalyani Chaudhari as Malan Jalindar Nimbalkar / Kusumavati Hanumant Khairnar
- Atul Kudale as Shatrughna Jalindar Nimbalkar
- Komal More as Tejashri Shankar Jagtap / Tejashri Shatrughna Nimbalkar

Jagtap family

- Prakash Tope as Shankar Jagtap (Tatya)
- Rajashri Nikam as Asha Shankar Jagtap
- Isha Sanjay as Rajashri Shankar Jagtap
- Juee Tanpure as Bhagyashri Shankar Jagtap
- Pushpa Chaudhari as Pushpa Baji Jagtap

Sarnobat family

- Yogesh Tanpure as Shashikant Sarnobat
- Swapnil Pawar as Satyajeet Sarnobat
- Smita Oak as Rambha Sarnobat
- Akash Patil as Prasad Sarnobat
- Smita Prabhu as Narmada Sarnobat

Sane family

- Shubham Patil as Dattatray Nana Sane (Dattu)
- Samruddhi Salvi as Dhanashri Shankar Jagtap / Dhanashri Dattatray Sane
- Ranjit Randive as Nana Sane
- Neelima Kamane as Usha Nana Sane (Nani)
- Sharvari Dhadawai as Yamuna Nana Sane

Others

- Madhugandha Kulkarni as Kalindi Dharmadhikari
- Adhokshaj Karhade as Sameer Nikam (Pintya)
- Mahesh Jadhav as Tulshiram (Kaju)
- Swapnil Kanase as Pundalik (Pudya)
- Omkar Karale as Vyankatesh
- Bipin Surve as Siddharth
- Vanraj Kumkar as Chhatri
- Apeksha Chavan as Kamini
- Sayali Mane as Pappi
- Vasu Patil as Sakha
- Sandip Naikwade as Raj
- Priyanka Swami as Manjula
- Shrikant K.T. as Prabhakar
- Shubhada Naik as Nirmala

== Awards ==
Zee Marathi Utsav Natyancha Awards 2024
Category	Recipient	Role	Ref.
Best Siblings		Surya and sisters	
Best Negative Actor	Girish Oak	Jalindar Nimbalkar (Daddy)	

== Reception ==
=== Special episode (1 hour) ===
- 2 February 2025
- 18 May 2025
- 8 June 2025

=== Mahasangam ===
Date	Series	Ref.
24-30 November 2024	Shiva	
7-12 April 2025	Savalyachi Janu Savali	

=== Airing history ===
No.	Airing Date	Days	Time (IST)
1	7 July – 22 December 2024	Daily	8.30 pm
2	23 December 2024 – 14 March 2025	Daily	9.30 pm
3	17 March – 9 August 2025	Daily	6.30 pm
4	11 August – 4 October 2025	Daily	6 pm

== Adaptations ==
Language	Title	Original release	Network(s)	Last aired	Notes	Ref.
Tamil	Anna அண்ணா	22 May 2023	Zee Tamil	18 January 2026	Original	
Telugu	Maa Annayya మా అన్నయ్యా	25 March 2024	Zee Telugu	7 June 2025	Remake	
Marathi	Lakhat Ek Aamcha Dada लाखात एक आमचा दादा	8 July 2024	Zee Marathi	4 October 2025	Remake	
Kannada	Annayya ಅಣ್ಣಯ್ಯ	12 August 2024	Zee Kannada	Ongoing	Remake	
Bengali	Amader Dadamoni আমাদের দাদামনি	7 July 2025	Zee Bangla	17 April 2026	Remake	
Malayalam	Valyettan വല്യേട്ടൻ	20 April 2026	Zee Keralam	Ongoing	Remake	
