= Majhya Navaryachi Bayko =

2016 Indian Marathi language TV series

- Genre: Indian soap opera Drama
- Written by: Adwait Dadarkar; Abhijeet Guru; Rohini Ninawe
- Directed by: Kedar Vaidya
- Starring: See below
- Theme music composer: Vishal-Jagdish
- Opening theme: "Majhya Navaryachi Bayko" by Vaishali Mhade
- Composer: Vishal-Jagdish
- Country of origin: India
- Original language: Marathi
- No. of episodes: 1354

Production
- Producer: Tejendra Neswankar
- Production locations: Mumbai, Maharashtra
- Cinematography: Vijay Soni; Rushi Mudrale
- Editor: Vishal Kotkar
- Camera setup: Multi-camera
- Running time: 22 minutes
- Production company: Trrump Carrd Production

Original release
- Network: Zee Marathi
- Release: 22 August 2016 – 7 March 2021

Majhya Navaryachi Bayko (transl. My Husband's Wife) is an Indian Marathi-language television series which aired on Zee Marathi. It premiered from 22 August 2016 by replacing Pasant Aahe Mulgi. It is produced by Tejendra Neswankar under the banner of Trrump Carrd production. It starred Anita Date-Kelkar, Abhijeet Khandkekar, Rasika Sunil, Adwait Dadarkar and Ruchira Jadhav.

The show was one of the top rated Marathi TV shows from its inception and also Zee Marathi's second longest running soap opera. The show received the highest ratings of 8.8 TVR in 2018.

== Summary ==
Gurunath and Radhika went from Nagpur to Mumbai. Radhika has a strong perception that her husband will not on cheat her, so revelation surprises her. Gurunath had an affair with Shanaya. Anand and Saumitra are friends of Gurunath and Radhika, but they support Radhika.

== Plot ==
The show starts with Radhika, who prepares tiffin for her husband, Gurunath, and their son, Atharva. She makes Popat Pohe for Gurunath, but he does not like it. While secretly talking to Shanaya, Gurunath is petrified when he suddenly sees Radhika in his room. He informs Radhika that he is going on an official tour to Delhi but goes to Shanaya's house instead. Gurunath's senior, Panvalkar Sir, calls Radhika and invites her to the annual party organized by their office. Gurunath takes Shanaya out for lunch and later for shopping. Shanaya tells Gurunath that she does not want him to take Radhika to the party. Later in the evening, Gurunath calls Radhika and informs her that he will return home in the morning. Shanaya expresses her disappointment with Gurunath.

Radhika becomes excited about the party. However, Gurunath tells her that he does not want her to attend. Although disheartened by his words, Radhika decides to go despite his objections. Later, at the hotel, Gurunath feels ashamed upon seeing Radhika at the party. Her presence annoys Shanaya, who then leaves. Gurunath is promoted to the position of senior manager. Radhika invites Gurunath's boss to their house for dinner. Meanwhile, Shanaya humiliates Gurunath. On their way home, Radhika praises Gurunath for his hard work.

A few days later, Subodh Gupte calls Radhika's friend, Revati Abhyankar, to inform her that he saw Shanaya with Radhika and Gurunath. Meanwhile, Gurunath looks for an opportunity to talk to Shanaya. Radhika tells Shanaya to stop referring to Gurunath as Garry. When Radhika discovers Gurunath's affair with Shanaya, he advises her to leave his house. However, Radhika tells Gurunath that she wishes to stay with him for the rest of her life and pleads with him not to throw her out. Gurunath refuses to listen to her and firmly states that he will continue meeting Shanaya.

6 months later

Radhika and Gurunath's childhood friend, Saumitra, returns from the United States. With Saumitra’s support, Radhika works hard to move ahead of Gurunath and make him pay for his wrongdoings. She starts making masalas and establishes her own company, Radhika Masale, eventually becoming the owner of a ₹300-crore business. Meanwhile, Shanaya and Gurunath dress up and prepare to put their best foot forward to impress their new boss. However, Gurunath's mother is displeased upon learning that Radhika is going to be Gurunath’s new boss. Radhika arrives with her team and receives a grand welcome. As Shanaya and Gurunath make their way through the crowd, they are left in shock when Radhika reveals that she is their new boss. Unable to handle Radhika’s success, a drunken Gurunath arrives at her society and starts throwing tantrums. He accuses her of seeking revenge, but after getting an earful from Radhika, he becomes infuriated and threatens to teach her a lesson. Eventually, Radhika falls in love with her friend Saumitra.

One year later

Radhika marries Saumitra. However, Gurunath, who attends the wedding disguised as a band player, feels saddened. Saumitra and Radhika promise to stand by each other for a lifetime and complete the rest of the rituals. After the wedding, Saumitra's family warmly welcomes Maya. Meanwhile, Gurunath and Shanaya's friend, KD (Abhijeet Guru), grows anxious when Shanaya and her mother, Sulakshana, decide to stay at his house. Maya shares her thoughts about Radhika with Saumitra. Later, when Shanaya and Sulakshana ask for Ranjan Mehta’s money, Gurunath scolds them. Meanwhile, at the office, Radhika assigns tasks to everyone. In an attempt to impress Maya, Gurunath later demonstrates a sales strategy before her.

After Gurunath deceives Shanaya, she turns to Radhika for support and starts helping her in every matter. Meanwhile, everyone is busy preparing for Shanaya’s wedding. Gurunath, believing that Shanaya wants to marry him, is eager and ready to tie the knot with her. Meanwhile, Radhika and Saumitra devise a plan to break Maya and Gurunath’s relationship. In reality, Shanaya is set to marry her friend, Kunal Kulkarni, but they have misled everyone into believing that she is marrying Shreyas. On the other hand, Shanaya tricks Gurunath into her plan and makes him believe that she wants to marry him. As a result, Gurunath is fully prepared for the wedding. However, Saumitra informs Maya about Gurunath’s intentions and urges her to attend Shanaya’s wedding. Finally, Radhika reveals to Gurunath that Shanaya’s real groom is Kunal.

A few days later, Jenny is kidnapped by Gotya Sheth, a local liquor seller. Determined to take action, Radhika decides to shut down the local liquor stores. However, when Maya and Shreyas go to the police station, the inspector refuses to file a complaint. Radhika then mobilizes the women in the community to vote for a ban on alcohol. As she investigates further, she realizes that Gotya Sheth is behind Jenny’s kidnapping. Disguised as Kamlakar, Gotya Sheth arrives to meet Radhika, making everyone anxious as he abducts Jenny. After receiving a suspicious gift from Gotya Sheth, Saumitra advises Radhika to leave the village for her safety. Meanwhile, Gotya Sheth interrogates Santosh, trying to figure out how Radhika managed to complete an important order. As Jenny expresses her craving for Punjabi food, everyone comes together to cook for her. Meanwhile, Gurunath repeatedly begs Gotya Sheth to bring his wife back. In response, Gotya Sheth warns Gurunath that he plans to kill Radhika’s loved ones. Later, Gotya Sheth makes a phone call, instructing someone to arrange for a bulldozer and a marriage hall. Soon after, Radhika receives a threatening message. Just as Seema Tai is at home, Radhika discovers a letter warning her about the imminent demolition of the warehouse.

Saumitra and Maya suspect that it could be Gotya Sheth’s plan and take precautionary measures to protect Radhika. Meanwhile, Radhika confronts Gotya Sheth, only to be shocked when she sees that the man demolishing the warehouse is none other than Gurunath. Anand informs Saumitra and Maya that Radhika has discovered Gurunath’s involvement. Gurunath then reveals to Radhika that he is not mentally unstable and threatens to kill Saumitra if she does not agree to be with him. Soon after, Gotya Sheth calls Radhika, informing her that he is coming to meet her. Maya devises a plan to trap him and sets up hidden cameras in the room, informing everyone, including Saumitra, about the plan. As per Maya’s strategy, Gotya Sheth arrives at the bungalow, unaware that the cameras are recording everything. Meanwhile, Gurunath pleads with Sarita, expressing his desire to meet Atharva. The threats made by Gotya Sheth are captured on the hidden cameras, and Shreyas quickly sends the footage to Saumitra. Upon hearing Gotya Sheth’s vile remarks, Radhika slaps him. When Gotya Sheth sees the incriminating video on his phone, he falls at Radhika’s feet and begs for forgiveness. The police arrive and arrest Gotya Sheth and his men. Saumitra is overjoyed when Shanaya arrives, and together, Radhika, Shanaya, and Maya decide to teach Gurunath a lesson. Later, Saumitra discusses the opportunity Gurunath has asked for, and Radhika explains the importance of Gurunath being in Atharva's life. The series concludes with an award ceremony, where the women in Radhika's life celebrate her achievements. Meanwhile, Maya and Shanaya expose Gurunath’s lies with the help of his other girlfriends. Ultimately, everyone unites to oust Gurunath once and for all.

== Cast ==
=== Main ===
- Anita Date-Kelkar as Radhika Gurunath Subhedar / Radhika Saumitra Banhatti (Radha): Saumitra's wife; Gurunath's ex-first wife; Atharva's biological mother; Shirish's older sister; Bhausaheb and Sarita's ex-first daughter-in-law; Yashwant and Vasundhara's daughter-in-law; Shanaya and Maya's friend
- Abhijeet Khandkekar as Gurunath Vasant Subhedar (Garry / Guru): Radhika and Shanaya's ex-husband; Maya's ex-boyfriend; Atharva's biological father; Bhausaheb and Sarita's son; Sulakshana's ex-son-in-law; Saumitra's ex-friend
- Rasika Sunil (2016-2018; 2020-2021) / Isha Keskar (2018-2020) as Shanaya Sabnis / Shanaya Gurunath Subhedar / Shanaya Kunal Kulkarni (Baccha); Kunal's wife; Gurunath's ex-second wife; Sulakshana's daughter; Radhika, Saumitra, and Maya's friend; Atharva's ex-step-mother; Bhausaheb and Sarita's ex-second daughter-in-law

=== Supporting ===
- Adwait Dadarkar as Saumitra Yashwant Banhatti (Sammy / Bokya): Radhika's husband; Atharva's step-father; Yashwant and Vasundhara's son; Shanaya and Maya's friend; Gurunath's ex-friend
- Ruchira Jadhav as Maya: Gurunath's ex-girlfriend; Radhika, Saumitra, and Shanaya's friend
- Mayuresh Sadhale as Mayuresh : Radhika’s Office Staff
- Devendra Dodke as Vasant Subhedar (Bhausaheb): Sarita's husband; Gurunath's father; Radhika and Shanaya's ex-father-in-law; Atharva's biological grandfather; Sulakshana's ex-co-father-in-law
- Bharati Patil as Sarita Vasant Subhedar: Bhausaheb's wife; Gurunath's mother; Radhika and Shanaya's ex-mother-in-law; Atharva's biological grandmother; Sulakshana's ex-co-mother-in-law
- Kishori Ambiye as Sulakshana Sabnis: Shanaya's mother; Kunal's mother-in-law; Gurunath's ex-mother-in-law; Bhausaheb and Sarita's ex-co-mother-in-law
- Aryan Devgiri as Atharva Gurunath Subhedar: Gurunath and Radhika's son; Saumitra's step-son; Shanaya's ex-step-son; Bhausaheb and Sarita's grandson; Yashwant and Vasundhara's step-grandson; Sulakshana's ex-step-grandson
- Gautam Jogalekar as Yashwant Banhatti: Vasundhara's husband; Saumitra's father; Radhika's father-in-law; Atharva's step-grandfather
- Vandana Pandit Sheth as Vasundhara Yashwant Banhatti: Yashwant's wife; Saumitra's mother; Radhika's mother-in-law; Atharva's step-grandmother
- Suyog Gorhe as Kunal Kulkarni: Shanaya's husband; Sulakshana's son-in-law
- Yash Pradhan as Subodh Gupte: Revati's husband; Neha's step-father
- Shweta Mehendale as Revati Mandar Abhyankar / Revati Subodh Gupte: Subodh's wife; Mandar's ex-wife; Neha's mother; Radhika's friend
- Shambhavi Karambalekar as Neha Mandar Abhyankar: Mandar and Revati's daughter; Subodh's step-daughter
- Aniket Kelkar as Mandar Abhyankar: Revati's ex-husband; Neha's biological father
- Arun Nalawade as Ramchandra Damle (Nana): Nani's husband; Pankaj's father; Samidha's father-in-law
- Suhita Thatte as Bharati Ramchandra Damle (Nani): Nana's wife; Pankaj's mother; Samidha's mother-in-law
- Vipul Salunkhe as Pankaj Ramchandra Damle: Samidha's husband; Nana and Nani's son
- Prajakta Datar Ganpule as Samidha Pankaj Damle: Pankaj's wife; Nana and Nani's daughter-in-law
- Mihir Rajda as Anand Shah: Jenny's husband; Radhika, Saumitra, Shanaya, and Gurunath's friend
- Sharmila Shinde as Jenny Anand Shah: Anand's wife; Radhika, Saumitra, Shanaya, and Gurunath's friend
- Abhijeet Guru as Kishore Das (KD): Shanaya's friend
- Sachin Deshpande as Shreyas Madhukar Kulkarni
- Jayant Ghate as Mr. Panvalkar: Gurunath's employer
- Shriram Pendse as Mr. Mahajani
- Kanchan Gupte as Mrs. Mahajani
- Pravin Dalimbkar as Raghu
- Vidyadhar Paranjape as Mr. Mahadik
- Pratima Kulkarni as Mrs. Sathe
- Aditi Dravid as Isha Nimbalkar: Shanaya's friend
- Kiran Mane as Shirish: Radhika's brother
- Chitra Khare as Chitra
- Priya Nanaware as Bhakti: Atharva's teacher; Shanaya's roommate
- Rohini Ninawe as KD's aunt
- Swati Bowalekar as Bakula
- Amruta Malwadkar as Pradnya: Bakula's daughter
- Meera Jagannath as Sanjana
- Vikas Patil as Saiprasad Mahajani
- Deepak Joshi as Mr. Kadam
- Kishor Chaughule as Popatrao
- Shruti as RJ Shruti

=== Cameo appearances ===
- Milind Shinde as Gotya Sheth
- Vijay Veer as Watchman
- Vinamra Babhal as Waiter
- Sachin Shirke as Marriage Hall Manager
- Sagar Sakpal as Advertise Director
- Komal Dhande as Urmila
- Vishwanath Kulkarni as Omkar Pradhan
- Madhavi Nimkar as Devika
- Siddharth Chandekar
- Sonali Kulkarni
- Mohan Joshi
- Shruti Marathe

== Production ==
=== Casting ===
I do not feel any pressure to playing Radhika because the character is very strong and inspiring I have learnt how to empathise from Radhika. She is able to judge and understand why certain people act a certain way. A lot of female fans keep telling that they get very inspired by Radhika.

— Anita Date Kelkar about Radhika.

Anita Date Kelkar was cast to portray Radhika Subhedar, Abhijeet Khandkekar was cast to portray Gurunath Subhedar, and Rasika Sunil was cast to portray Shanaya Sabnis. In April 2018, Adwait Dadarkar entered the show as second male lead Saumitra Banhatti. In September 2018, Sunil exited the show for her Directorate education, and Isha Keskar entered the show to replace Shanaya. In July 2020, Keskar exited the show and Sunil re-entered the show as Shanaya. In January 2020, Ruchira Jadhav entered the show as Maya.

=== Filming ===
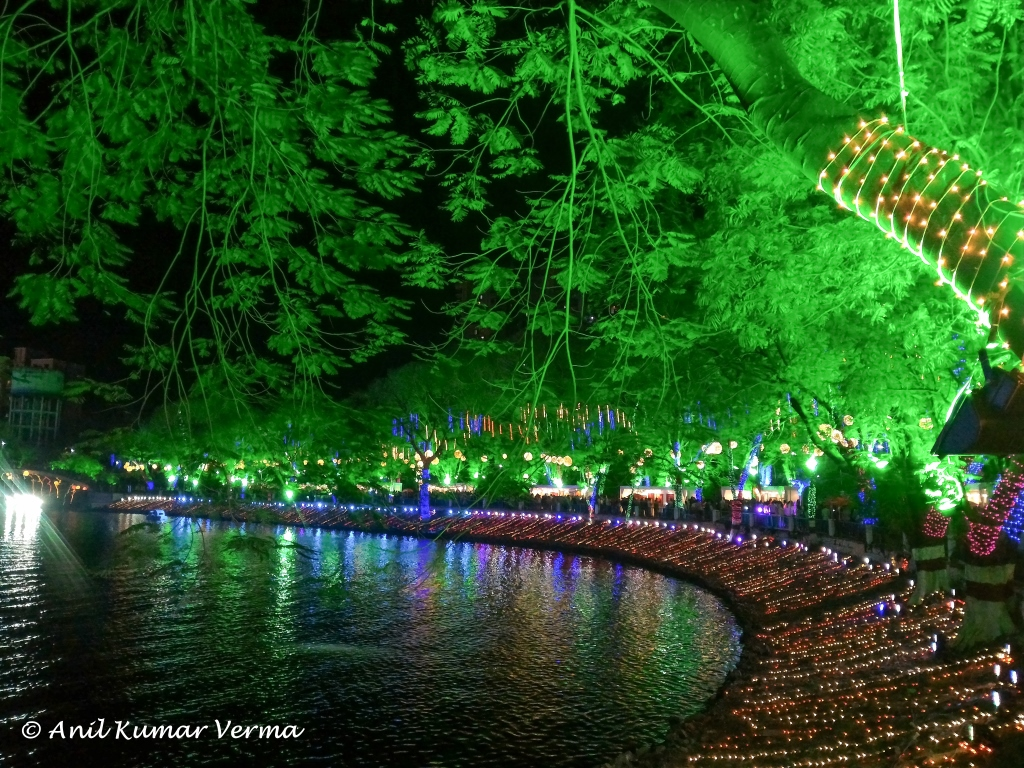
Shooting location at Upvan Lake

Based on the backdrop of City, the series mainly filmed on the sets which is created on Thane. They mainly filmed in Upvan Lake, area of Gadkari Rangaytan. The series has set in a residential complex in Thane, but recently the team decided to shift it to a resort near Igatpuri in Nashik due to COVID-19 pandemic, but after Diwali, they again shifted to their original location set in Thane.

=== Cancellation ===
Due to falling ratings of series from October 2020, makers revamped the story but it didn't work. Therefore, channel decide to shift show to non-prime timeslot of 6:30 pm, but the TRP of the show continued to drop and leading to the channel and makers pulling of the show. The show went off air on 7 March 2021 with its 2 hours final episode.

== Reception ==
=== Special episode ===
==== 1 hour ====
- 25 September 2016
- 25 December 2016
- 15 April 2018
- 2 September 2018
- 6 January 2019
- 19 May 2019
- 15 December 2019
- 1 November 2020
- 13 December 2020
- 7 February 2021

==== 2 hours ====
- 29 July 2018 (Radha-Guru's Divorce)
- 7 March 2021 (Last Episode)

=== Airing history ===
| No. | Airing Date | Days | Time (IST) |
|---|---|---|---|
| 1 | 22 August 2016 – 29 February 2020 | Mon-Sat (sometimes Sun) | 8 pm |
| 2 | 2 – 27 March 2020 | Mon-Sat (sometimes Sun) | 9 pm |
| 3 | 13 July 2020 – 2 January 2021 | Mon-Sat (sometimes Sun) | 8 pm |
| 4 | 4 January – 7 March 2021 | Mon-Sat (sometimes Sun) | 6.30 pm |

=== Ratings ===
| Week | Year | BARC Viewership | | Ref. |
| Week | Year | TRP | Rank | Ref. |
|---|---|---|---|---|
| Week 34 | 2016 | 2.4 | 2 | |
| Week 38 | 2016 | 1.9 | 4 | |
| Week 42 | 2016 | 3.3 | 1 | |
| Week 47 | 2016 | 4.5 | 1 | |
| Week 12 | 2017 | 5.7 | 1 | |
| Week 15 | 2017 | 6.6 | 1 | |
| Week 17 | 2017 | 5.6 | 1 | |
| Week 23 | 2017 | 3.7 | 2 | |
| Week 27 | 2017 | 5.5 | 2 | |
| Week 31 | 2017 | 5.3 | 2 | |
| Week 37 | 2017 | 5.9 | 1 | |
| Week 49 | 2017 | 7.0 | 2 | |
| Week 15 | 2018 | 6.3 | 1 | |
| Week 19 | 2018 | 6.1 | 2 | |
| Week 34 | 2018 | 8.3 | 1 | |
| Week 35 | 2018 | 7.8 | 1 | |
| Week 37 | 2018 | 7.6 | 1 | |
| Week 38 | 2018 | 7.9 | 1 | |
| Week 40 | 2018 | 8.3 | 1 | |
| Week 41 | 2018 | 7.9 | 1 | |
| Week 42 | 2018 | 7.1 | 1 | |
| Week 43 | 2018 | 6.3 | 2 | |
| Week 44 | 2018 | 7.9 | 2 | |
| Week 45 | 2018 | 6.9 | 1 | |
| Week 46 | 2018 | 7.9 | 1 | |
| Week 47 | 2018 | 7.8 | 1 | |
| Week 48 | 2018 | 7.9 | 1 | |
| Week 49 | 2018 | 7.3 | 1 | |
| Week 50 | 2018 | 7.0 | 1 | |
| Week 51 | 2018 | 7.3 | 1 | |
| Week 52 | 2018 | 6.3 | 1 | |
| Week 1 | 2019 | 6.8 | 1 | |
| Week 2 | 2019 | 5.9 | 2 | |
| Week 3 | 2019 | 8.2 | 1 | |
| Week 4 | 2019 | 7.8 | 1 | |
| Week 5 | 2019 | 7.6 | 1 | |
| Week 14 | 2019 | 4.2 | 1 | |
| Week 16 | 2019 | 4.3 | 1 | |
| Week 17 | 2019 | 4.4 | 1 | |
| Week 21 | 2019 | 4.2 | 1 | |
| Week 23 | 2019 | 5.2 | 1 | |
| Week 25 | 2019 | 5.0 | 1 | |
| Week 26 | 2019 | 5.6 | 2 | |
| Week 27 | 2019 | 7.5 | 1 | |
| Week 28 | 2019 | 6.8 | 1 | |
| Week 29 | 2019 | 6.3 | 2 | |
| Week 30 | 2019 | 6.6 | 2 | |
| Week 31 | 2019 | 6.5 | 2 | |
| Week 32 | 2019 | 6.4 | 2 | |
| Week 34 | 2019 | 6.7 | 2 | |
| Week 35 | 2019 | 6.4 | 2 | |
| Week 36 | 2019 | 5.6 | 2 | |
| Week 37 | 2019 | 5.7 | 2 | |
| Week 38 | 2019 | 5.5 | 2 | |
| Week 39 | 2019 | 5.8 | 2 | |
| Week 48 | 2019 | 4.2 | 2 | |
| Week 50 | 2019 | 4.7 | 1 | |
| Week 52 | 2019 | 5.6 | 1 | |
| Week 53 | 2019 | 5.1 | 1 | |
| Week 1 | 2020 | 4.4 | 1 | |
| Week 2 | 2020 | 4.3 | 1 | |
| Week 3 | 2020 | 4.2 | 3 | |
| Week 4 | 2020 | 4.1 | 1 | |
| Week 5 | 2020 | 4.4 | 1 | |
| Week 6 | 2020 | 4.5 | 1 | |
| Week 7 | 2020 | 4.2 | 1 | |
| Week 8 | 2020 | 4.3 | 1 | |
| Week 9 | 2020 | 2.7 | 4 | |
| Week 10 | 2020 | 4.4 | 2 | |
| Week 13 | 2020 | 1.9 | 5 | |
| Week 28 | 2020 | 3.8 | 2 | |
| Week 36 | 2020 | 3.2 | 3 | |
| Week 37 | 2020 | 4.6 | 1 | |
| Week 38 | 2020 | 3.5 | 3 | |
| Week 39 | 2020 | 3.7 | 4 | |

== Adaptations ==
| Language | Title | Original release | Network(s) | Last aired | Notes |
|---|---|---|---|---|---|
| Marathi | Majhya Navaryachi Bayko माझ्या नवऱ्याची बायको | 22 August 2016 | Zee Marathi | 7 March 2021 | Original |
| Kannada | Subbalakshmi Samsara ಸಬ್ಬಲಕ್ಷ್ಮಿ ಸಂಸಾರ | 12 June 2017 | Zee Kannada | 3 April 2020 | Remake |
| Punjabi | Khasma Nu Khani ਖ਼ਸਮਾਂ ਨੂੰ ਖਾਣੀ | 13 January 2020 | Zee Punjabi | 3 June 2022 | Remake |
| Hindi | Hamari Radha हमारी राधा | 13 July 2026 | Anmol TV | Ongoing | Remake |
| Hindi | Mere Raja Ki Rani मेरे राजा की रानी | 1 July 2024 | Zee TV | 16 September 2024 | Dubbed |
| Bengali | Bhalobashar Lukochuri ভালোবাসার লুকোচুরি | 22 July 2024 | Zee Bangla | 21 September 2024 | Dubbed |

== Awards ==
Zee Marathi Utsav Natyancha Awards
| Year | Category | Recipient | Ref. |
|---|---|---|---|
| 2016 | Best Mother | Anita Date-Kelkar | |
| 2016 | Best Negative Actress | Rasika Sunil | |
| 2017 | Best Negative Actress | Rasika Sunil | |
| 2017 | Best Character Female | Anita Date-Kelkar | |
| 2017 | Best Negative Actor | Abhijeet Khandkekar | |
| 2017 | Best Mother-in-law | Bharati Patil | |
| 2018 | Best Actress | Anita Date-Kelkar | |
| 2018 | Best Character Female | Anita Date-Kelkar | |
| 2018 | Best Supporting Female | Shweta Mehendale | |
| 2018 | Best Mother-in-law | Bharati Patil | |
| 2018 | Best Father-in-law | Devendra Dodke | |
| 2019 | Best Father | Devendra Dodke | |
