= Lakshya (TV series) =

Indian crime television series

- Genre: Crime fiction; Suspense; Thriller
- Created by: Aadesh Bandekar
- Written by: Satish Rajwade; Santosh Patil; Arti Mhaskar
- Directed by: Bharat Gaikwad
- Starring: Season 1 -: Ashok Samarth; Aditi Sarangdhar; Pari Telang; Kamlesh Sawant; Shweta Shinde; Season 2 -: Abhijeet Shwetchandra; Soham Bandekar; Uday Sabnis; Amit Dolawat; Shubhangi Sadavarte; Bhushan Telang
- Theme music composer: Season 2 - Raviraj Kotharkar
- Opening theme: Lakshya by Adarsh Shinde
- Country of origin: India
- Original language: Marathi
- No. of seasons: 2
- No. of episodes: 1226 (season 1) + 78 (season 2)

Production
- Producers: Aadesh Bandekar; Suchitra Bandekar
- Production locations: Mumbai, Maharashtra, India
- Camera setup: Multi-Camera
- Running time: 45 minutes
- Production company: Soham Productions

Original release
- Network: Star Pravah
- Release: 25 August 2011 – 30 October 2022

Lakshya is an Indian crime television series which was first aired on 25 August 2011 and ended on 17 September 2016. Its sequel has launched from 7 March 2021 on every Sunday named as Nave Lakshya.

== Series ==
Season	Episodes	Originally Broadcast	
Season	Episodes	First aired	Last aired
1	1226	25 August 2011	17 September 2016
2	78	7 March 2021	25 April 2021
2	78	4 July 2021	30 October 2022

== Plot ==
=== Lakshya (Season 1) ===
It is a story of Police team named Unit 8. The team solves a new case and tactfully battles it out with the criminals. The team members shared a common goal to eradicating crime and they will go to any extent to ensure that justice is served.

=== Nave Lakshya (Season 2) ===
It is a story of Police team named Unit 9. It revolves around a competent police team. It will show the police team trying to solve crime cases and several social cases to make the lives of the people in society better. It will focus on how a dedicated team of police shall bring about justice in an area using their skills and resources.

== Cast ==
=== Lakshya (Season 1) ===
- Ashok Samarth as ACP Abhay Kirtikar
- Aditi Sarangdhar as Sub-inspector Saloni Deshmukh
- Shweta Shinde as Inspector Renu
- Pari Telang as Inspector Disha Suryavanshi
- Kamlesh Sawant as Head Constable Maruti Jagdale
- Gayatri Soham as Inspector Suvarna
- Jagannath Nivangune as Sub-inspector Virendra Kadam
- Dhanashree Kshirsagar as PSI Parna Desai
- Ramesh Wani as Hawaldar
- Mandar Kulkarni as Hacker Manas
- Sandesh Jadhav as Inspector Suryakant Bhaurao Bhosale
- Snehal Chandwadkar as multiple roles

=== Guest ===
- Sonam Kapoor

=== Nave Lakshya (Season 2) ===
- Abhijeet Shwetchandra as Vikrant Gaikwad
- Soham Bandekar as Jay Dixit
- Shubhangi Sadavarte as Mokshada Mohite
- Amit Dolawat as Arjun Karandikar
- Uday Sabnis as Appa Malwankar
- Bhushan Telang as Sub-inspector
- Aditi Sarangdhar as Inspector Saloni Deshmukh
- Shweta Shinde as Inspector Renuka Rathore
- Snehal Chandwadkar as multiple roles

== Production ==
=== Season 1 ===
Lakshya is a fast-paced narrative and its action packed sequences will differentiate it completely from other fictional shows on Marathi GECs. We are confident of a positive response from our audiences

— Nachiket Pantvaidya, General Manager of Star Pravah.

ACP Abhay Kirtikar played by well-known actor Ashok Samarth who also starred in Singham. Aditi Sarangdhar comeback to television as Sub-inspector Saloni Deshmukh and Jagannath Nivangune was seen as Sub-inspector Virendra Kadam. Kamlesh Sawant and Mandar Kulkarni was essay constable Maruti Jagdale and ethical hacker Manas respectively. Shweta Shinde and Dhanashree Kshirsagar were selected to play the role of Inspector Renu and PSI Parna Desai respectively.

=== Season 2 ===
We are proud to tell the story of our dutiful police and their department. This new goal will reveal what it takes to be fertile, what it takes to be smart, and how it can help you stay alert. While watching this series, you will realise that our Maharashtra Police Department is standing firmly behind you like brothers and sisters.

— Satish Rajwade, Programme Head of Star Pravah.

Soham Bandekar son of Aadesh Bandekar and Suchitra Bandekar debutante with the role of Police inspector Jay Dixit. Shubhangi Sadavarte playing the role of Police inspector Mokshada Mohite.

=== Mahaepisode (2 hours) ===
- 15 August 2021
- 13 March 2022
- 24 July 2022
