= Jeta (film) =

- Promotional release poster
- Directed by: Yogesh Sahebrao Mahajan
- Written by: Yogesh Sahebrao Mahajan
- Screenplay by: Sanjay Laxmanrao Yadav; Yogesh Sabnis; Yogesh Sahebrao Mahajan
- Produced by: Sanjay Laxmanrao Yadav
- Starring: Snehal Deshmukh; Nitish Chavan; Sharad Goyekar; Mugdha Chaphekar; Pragya Sonawane
- Production company: Sanju Entertainment
- Release date: 25 November 2022
- Country: India
- Language: Marathi

Jeta is a 2022 Indian Marathi-language film directed by Yogesh Sahebrao Mahajan and produced by Sanju Entertainment, starring Snehal Deshmukh and Nitish Chavan in the leading roles and Sharad Goyekar, Aniket Kelkar, Pragya Sonawane-Davre in supporting roles.

== Plot ==
It depicts the journey of a stubborn young man who falls in love with a woman from a rich family. It presents some neglected aspects of friendship that have never been explored before. The film shows the reality while presenting the bitter truth of life.

== Cast ==
- Snehal Deshmukh
- Nitish Chavan
- Sharad Goyekar
- Mugdha Chaphekar
- Pragya Sonawane
