= Neha Khan =

Indian model and actress (born 1995)

- Born: Amravati, Maharashtra, India
- Education: Mumbai University
- Occupations: Model, actress
- Known for: Devmanus

Neha Khan is an Indian model and actress who works in Marathi, Malayalam and Bollywood films. She is known for playing ACP Divya Singh in Zee Marathi's TV Series Devmanus.

== Early life ==
Neha was born in Amravati, Maharashtra in a Muslim family. In 8th grade she started participating in modelling competitions and went on to win 'Princess of Maharashtra' at the age of 15.

== Career ==
Neha moved to Mumbai in 2014 after she received a role in the multilingual movie Bad Girl, starring Sherlyn Chopra and directed by Shajiyem. She played a model named 'Deepika' in the movie. She joined Anupam Kher's acting school and in June 2014, she was cast in a small role in the movie Uvaa. She played the role of Kamini in the Marathi movie Gurukul, which was released in August 2015.

== Filmography ==
=== Films ===
Year	Film	Role	Language	Notes
2015	Uvaa	Mala	Hindi	
2015	Gurukul	Kamini	Marathi	
2016	Ghayal: Once Again	Renu	Hindi	
2017	1971: Beyond Borders	Indian Army PR Officer	Malayalam	
2018	Shikari	Savita	Marathi	
2018	The Dark Side of Life: Mumbai City	Kavya	Hindi	
2019	Kaale Dhande	Supporting character	Marathi	Web series released on ZEE5
2022	Operation Romeo	Aditya's sister	Hindi	
2023	Adipurush	Trijata	Hindi, Telugu	Bilingual film
2024	Bai Ga	Jenny	Marathi	

=== Television ===
Year	Film	Role	Language	Ref.
2019	Yuva Dancing Queen	Contestant	Marathi	
2020	Tera Yaar Hoon Main	Tanisha	Hindi	
2021	Devmanus	ACP Divya Singh	Marathi	
2021	Chala Hawa Yeu Dya	Herself	Marathi	
2022	Fu Bai Fu (season 9)	Contestant	Marathi	

=== Web series ===
- Cyber Vaar - Har Screen Crime Scene as Asha

=== Music video ===
Year	Title	Singer(s)	Ref.
2021	O Aasman Wale	Jubin Nautiyal	
