= Urmi (film) =

- Theatrical release poster
- Directed by: Rajesh Jadhav
- Written by: Rajesh Jadhav
- Produced by: Pravin Chaudhari
- Starring: Chinmay Udgirkar; Sayali Sanjeev; Rasika Sunil; Nitish Chavan
- Cinematography: Kaushal Goswami
- Edited by: Anant Kamath
- Music by: Vijay Gatlewar; Utpal Choudhari
- Production company: Samruddhi Creations
- Distributed by: August Entertainment
- Release date: 14 April 2023
- Country: India
- Language: Marathi

Urmi is a 2023 Indian Marathi-language romantic drama film directed by Rajesh Jadhav and produced by Pravin Chaudhari, starring Chinmay Udgirkar, Sayali Sanjeev, Rasika Sunil and Nitish Chavan. The film was theatrically released on 14 April 2023.

== Cast ==
- Chinmay Udgirkar
- Sayali Sanjeev
- Rasika Sunil
- Nitish Chavan
- Rutuja Junnarkar
- Sayali Paradkar
- Madhav Abhyankar

== Release ==
Urmi was released in theatres on 14 April 2023.

== Reception ==
Anub George of The Times of India gave one star out of five and founding faults in story and editing and wrote "Urmi is a good example of a story with potential suffering from bad execution." Film information wrote "The story has written a fairly intriguing story but its culmination is not satisfying, screenplay holds the audience’s interest in parts only."

== Soundtrack ==
Urmi

Soundtrack album by Vijay Gatlewar, Utpal Choudhari
- Released: 2023
- Genre: Feature film soundtrack
- Length: 19:58
- Language: Marathi
- Label: Zee Music Company

Official audio
- Urmi - Full Album on YouTube

The music of the film is composed by Vijay Gatlewar and Utpal Choudhari, background music is scored by Anurag Godbole. The songs are sung by Swapnil Bandodkar, Vaishali Samant, Mangesh Bargaonkar, Anandi Joshi and lyrics is by Pravin Chaudhari.

All lyrics are written by Pravin Chaudhari.

Track listing
| No. | Title | Music | Singer (s) | Length |
|---|---|---|---|---|
| 1. | "Priya Roop Ase He Tuze" | Vijay Gatlewar | Swapnil Bandodkar, Vaishali Samant | 4:23 |
| 2. | "Sath Tuzya Premachi" | Vijay Gatlewar | Mangesh Bargaonkar, Anandi Joshi | 3:51 |
| 3. | "Ye Priya Tu" | Utpal Choudhari | Anandi Joshi | 4:12 |
| 4. | "U R Crazy Boy" | Vijay Gatlewar | Vaishali Samant | 4:31 |
| Total length: | | | | 19:58 |
