= Subbalakshmi Samsara =

Kannada language drama TV series

- Genre: Drama
- Directed by: Sapna Krishna
- Starring: See below
- Country of origin: India
- Original language: Kannada
- No. of episodes: 733

Production
- Production locations: Bengaluru, Karnataka, India
- Camera setup: Multi-camera
- Running time: 22 minutes
- Production company: RR Creations

Original release
- Network: Zee Kannada
- Release: 12 June 2017 – 3 April 2020

Related
- Majhya Navaryachi Bayko

Subbalakshmi Samsara is an Indian Kannada language drama series which premiered from 12 June 2017 on Zee Kannada. The show is an official remake of Marathi TV series Majhya Navaryachi Bayko. It stars Bhavani Singh, Samiksha Ram and Deepa Bhaskar in lead roles. This show abruptly stopped on 3 April 2020 due to COVID-19 pandemic.

== Plot ==
Subbalakshmi is a housewife who loves her husband unconditionally and tries to help him with his problems. She does not know about his affair with another woman.

== Cast ==
=== Main ===
- Deepa Bhaskar as Subbalakshmi
- Bhavani Singh as Gurumurthy
- Samiksha Ram as Shanaya

=== Recurring ===
- Nihal Sagar Vishnu as Atharva
- Mukhyamantri Chandru
- Girija Lokesh
- Ramesh Bhat

== Adaptations ==
Language	Title	Original release	Network(s)	Last aired	Notes
Marathi	Majhya Navaryachi Bayko माझ्या नवऱ्याची बायको	22 August 2016	Zee Marathi	7 March 2021	Original
Kannada	Subbalakshmi Samsara ಸಬ್ಬಲಕ್ಷ್ಮಿ ಸಂಸಾರ	12 June 2017	Zee Kannada	3 April 2020	Remake
Punjabi	Khasma Nu Khani ਖ਼ਸਮਾਂ ਨੂੰ ਖਾਣੀ	13 January 2020	Zee Punjabi	3 June 2022	Remake
