= Alti Palti Sumdit Kalti =

Marathi-language comedy series

- Genre: Comedy; Drama
- Written by: Arvind Jagtap
- Starring: See below
- Country of origin: India
- Original language: Marathi
- No. of episodes: 90

Production
- Production locations: Mumbai, Maharashtra, India
- Camera setup: Multi-camera
- Running time: 22 minutes

Original release
- Network: Zee Marathi
- Release: 7 August 2019 – 11 January 2020

Alti Palti Sumdit Kalti is an Indian Marathi language comedy TV series which aired on Zee Marathi. It starred Shivani Baokar and Chetan Vadnere in lead roles. It premiered from 7 August 2019 airing Wednesday to Saturday and ended on 11 January 2020 completing 90 episodes.

== Plot ==
When two fraudsters team up, they leave everyone in town exasperated. With the police and the public after them, the duo must keep getting creative to make a success of their cheating business.

== Cast ==
=== Main ===
- Shivani Baokar as Pallavi
- Chetan Vadnere as Alankar

=== Cameo appearances ===
- Bipin Surve
- Sakshi Gandhi
- Varsha Ghatpande
- Pooja Pawar-Salunkhe
- Chaitanya Sardeshpande
