= Rasika Sunil =

Indian actress and model (born 1992)

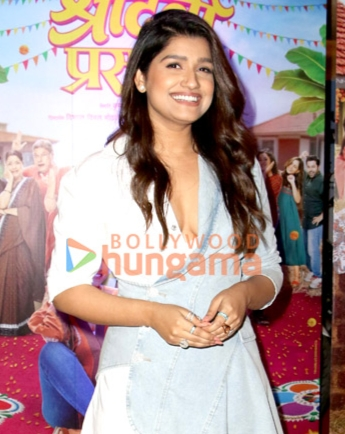
- Rasika Sunil in 2024
- Born: Rasika Dhabadgaonkar; 3 August 1992 (age 34); Akola, Maharashtra, India
- Occupations: Actress; model
- Years active: 2016–present
- Known for: Majhya Navaryachi Bayko
- Spouse: Aditya Bilagi (m. 2021)

Rasika Sunil Dhabadgaonkar (born 3 August 1992) professionally known as Rasika Sunil is an Indian model, television and film actress who mainly works in Marathi film industry. She made her film debut with Poshter Girl (2016) and Television debut with Majhya Navaryachi Bayko (2016).

== Early life ==
She was born in Akola, Maharashtra. She did her schooling from Vindya Niketan school Dombivli .She did her BMM Degree from K. G. Joshi Bedekar College, Thane. She is a trained classical dancer and holds a Diploma in Bharatnatyam. She has also done Sangeet Visharad in Indian classical music. Thereafter, she participated in various competitions like Youth Festivals and Rajya Natya Spardhas. She participated in 52nd Natya Spardha and Won first prize for her play Love Aaj Kal. Later, she went do commercial plays.

== Personal life ==
Rasika married Aditya Bilagi on 18 October 2021.

== Career ==
She started her career with commercial plays. She participated in the Lux Jhakaas Heroine Contest on 9X TV. In 2016, she did a lavani in Kashala Lavato Naat in the Marathi film Poshter Girl. In the same year, she bagged role of "Shanaya Sabnis" in Majhya Navaryachi Bayko. She also appeared in the Bus Stop in which she played a Youth girl. She also made her performance in Tum Bin Mohe a music video as an Actor, Singer and director also. She made her debut in International short film named Wild Geese.

== Filmography ==
Key
| † | Denotes films that have not yet been released |

=== Films ===
| Year | Title | Role | Ref. |
|---|---|---|---|
| 2016 | Poshter Girl | Sangita (Lavani Dancer) | |
| 2017 | Baghtos Kay Mujra Kar | Pandurang's wife | |
| 2017 | Bus Stop | Maithili | |
| 2017 | Tula Kalnnaar Nahi | Nandini | |
| 2018 | Gat-Mat | Kaavya | |
| 2019 | Girlfriend | Shweta | |
| 2019 | Wild Geese | Vanessa | |
| 2023 | Urmi | Urmi | |
| 2023 | Phakaat | Lily | |
| 2023 | Sshort And Ssweet | Sanju's love interest | |
| 2024 | Sridevi Prasanna | Neerja | |
| 2024 | Danka Hari Namacha | Zasha | |

=== Television ===
| Year | Title | Role | Ref. |
|---|---|---|---|
| 2016-2021 | Majhya Navaryachi Bayko | Shanaya Sabnis | |
| 2021-2022 | Meter Down | Pranali | |
| 2023 | Sur Nava Dhyas Nava - Aavaj Tarunaicha | Host | |

=== Theatre ===
| Year | Title | Role | Ref. |
|---|---|---|---|
| 2023 | Diet Lagna | Hruta | |
| 2024 | 2 Vajun 22 Minitani | Sonali | |

=== Album Song ===
| Year | Title | Ref. |
|---|---|---|
| 2020 | Tum Bin Mohe | |

== Awards and nominations ==
| Year | Awards | Category | Show | Result |
|---|---|---|---|---|
| 2016 | Zee Marathi Awards | Best Character Female | Majhya Navaryachi Bayko | Nominated |
| 2016 | Zee Marathi Awards | Best Negative Role Female | Majhya Navaryachi Bayko | Won |
| 2017 | Zee Marathi Awards | Best Negative Role Female | Majhya Navaryachi Bayko | Won |
| 2017 | Zee Marathi Awards | Best Character Female | Majhya Navaryachi Bayko | Nominated |
| 2017 | Yuva Chitra Padarpan Puraskar | Best Supporting Actress | Baghtos Kay Mujra Kar | Won |
