= Pari Telang =

Indian actress and voice artist

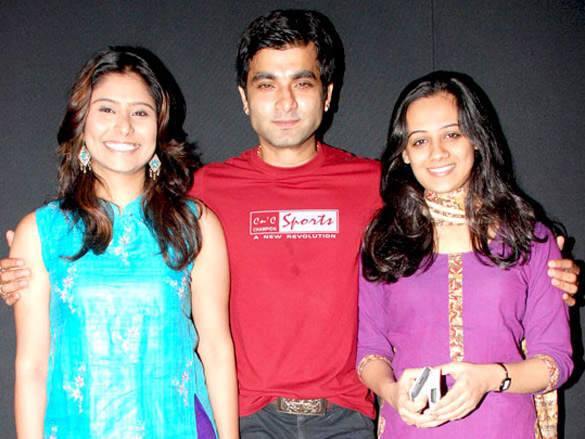
- Telang (on left) with Santosh Juvekar (center) and Spruha Joshi.
- Born: 12 February 1988 (age 38); Mumbai, Maharashtra
- Occupation: Actress
- Years active: 1999–present
- Known for: Lakshya; Aabhalmaya
- Spouse: Siddhesh Shirgaonkar (m. 2020)

Pari Telang (born 12 February 1987) is an Indian actress and voice artist who worked in several Marathi as well as Hindi films, television and theatres. She is known for her portrayal in Star Pravah's Lakshya as Sub-inspector Disha Suryawanshi. She also played a child role. She has worked in Morya and Guldasta.

== Career ==
She started her work as a child actor, her first major role was in Zee Marathi's first soap Aabhalmaya as Anushka Joshi.

She also acted in comedy TV show Fu Bai Fu on Zee Marathi. She plays the role of a police inspector Disha Suryawanshi in Star Pravah's TV serial Lakshya. She also work as comedian in Marathi serial Comedy Express which held by ETV Marathi.

Along with being an actress, she is a dubbing artist as well, having worked with a number of Disney Serials as well as for Harry Potter films. She is also a host and an anchor.

== Personal life ==
Pari Telang's father is Bhushan Telang, who is also an actor in Marathi film Industry. She was born and brought up in Mumbai and her education was completed at Ramnarain Ruia College in Mumbai.

In 2020, she married her beau Siddhesh Shirgaonkar in Mumbai

== Filmography ==
=== Films ===
| Year | Title | Role | Ref/Note |
|---|---|---|---|
| 2011 | Morya | Manya's girlfriend | Debut film |
| 2011 | Guldasta | Janhvi | |
| 2016 | Poshter Girl | Bharatrao's wife | Special appearance |
| 2024 | Gharat Ganpati | | |

=== Television ===
| Year | Title | Role | Notes | Ref. |
|---|---|---|---|---|
| 1999-2000 | Aabhalmaya | Akanksha Joshi | Debut/Child actor | |
| 2000 | Tak Dhina Dhin | Host | For few episodes | |
| 2006 | Valvacha Paaus | | | |
| 2007 | Chukar Mere Mann Ko | Samiksha | Lead role | |
| 2008 | Mogra Phulala | Host | | |
| 2009 | Bandini | | Special appearance | |
| 2009 | Comedy Express | Contestant | | |
| 2010 | Fu Bai Fu | Contestant | | |
| 2011-2015 | Lakshya | Sub-Inspector Disha Suryawanshi | | |
| 2020-2021 | Comedy Beemedy | Contestant | | |
| 2022-2023 | Tu Chal Pudha | Vrushali Sontakke/Meera Kalsekar | | |
| 2023 | Lavangi Mirchi | Yamini Patil | Negative role | |
| 2024 | Paaru | Meera | | |
