= Phakaat =

2023 Indian Marathi-language action comedy film

- Theatrical release poster
- Directed by: Shreyash Jadhav
- Screenplay by: Aniket Wakchaure; Rajesh Kolan
- Story by: Shreyash Jadhav
- Produced by: Nita Jadhav
- Starring: Suyog Gorhe; Hemant Dhome; Avinash Narkar; Anuja Sathe; Kabir Duhan Singh; Kiran Gaikwad; Nitish Chavan; Rasika Sunil
- Cinematography: Maneesh Bhatt
- Edited by: Ashish Mhatre
- Music by: Harshwardhan Wavre; Karan Wavre; Aditya Patekar
- Production company: Ganraj Studios
- Distributed by: Vakratunda Entertainment
- Release date: 2 June 2023
- Running time: 122 minutes
- Country: India
- Language: Marathi
- Box office: est.₹1.04 crore

Phakaat is a 2023 Indian Marathi-language action-comedy film directed by Shreyas Jadhav and produced by Ganraj Studios. The film stars Suyog Gorhe, Hemant Dhome, Avinash Narkar, Anuja Sathe, Rasika Sunil, Kabir Duhan Singh, Kiran Gaikwad, Nitish Chavan. It was theatrically released on 2 June 2023.

== Plot ==
Two drunk village boys stumble upon a top-secret military document about an attack on Pakistan. They plan to sell it for a big profit. However, a militant group also wants the document and begins hunting them down. The boys get caught in a dangerous situation, torn between making money and surviving the threats from the militants.

== Cast ==
- Suyog Gorhe as Raju
- Hemant Dhome as Salim
- Avinash Narkar as Major Abbas Naik
- Anuja Sathe as Salma
- Rasika Sunil as Lily
- Kabir Duhan Singh as Hafeez bhai
- Nitish Chavan
- Kiran Gaikwad as Maksood
- Mahesh Jadhav as Dawood Ibrahim Parkar
- Abhijeet Khandkekar as Siddharth Thakur
- Anvay Bendre as Raju's father
- Jolly Bhatia - dancer in the song Bhai

== Release ==
The film was theatrically released on 2 June 2023. Previously it was set to be released on 19 May 2023.

== Reception ==
=== Critical reception ===
In a negative review Saurav Mahind of Urbanly rated half star out of five stars and wrote that the film is an out and out flop show. Not even a single joke works in the 135 minutes of the film.

=== Box office ===
The film collected ₹15.21 lakh on its opening day. It collected ₹91.26 lakh in three days and ₹1.04 crore in four days.
