= Majnu (2022 film) =

- Theatrical release poster
- Directed by: Shivaji Doltade
- Written by: Govardhan Doltade
- Produced by: Govardhan Doltade; Bharat Changde; Deepali Garje-Sanap
- Starring: Rohan Patil; Nitish Chavan; Shwetlana Ahire
- Cinematography: M B Allikatti
- Edited by: Chetan Sagde
- Music by: P Shankram; Sachin Awghade; Sajan-Vishal
- Production company: Sonai Film Creation
- Distributed by: UFO Moviez
- Release date: 10 June 2022
- Country: India
- Language: Marathi

Majnu is a 2022 Indian Marathi-language drama film directed by Shivaji Doltade and produced by Sonai Film Creation, starring Rohan Patil, Nitish Chavan, Shwetlana Ahire in the leading roles. The film was theatrically released on 10 June 2022.

== Cast ==
- Rohan Patil as Vishal
- Nitish Chavan as Sagar
- Shwetlana Ahire as Kasturi
- Suresh Vishwakarma

== Release ==
Majnu was theatrically released on 10 June 2022.

== Reception ==
=== Critical reception ===
Anub George of The Times of India gave one and half stars out of five stars wrote "Majnu is a film that has good bones but fails due to poor delivery"

A reviewer from Lokmat praised locations, cinematography, while criticised writing, performances, said that it is "very boring and disappointing."
