= Khasma Nu Khani =

Indian Punjabi television series

- Genre: Drama
- Screenplay by: Damini Kanwal Shetty
- Directed by: Rajeev Sham Laal Soni
- Country of origin: India
- Original language: Punjabi
- No. of episodes: 552

Production
- Production location: Mohali
- Editor: Santosh Singh Umesh Prajapati
- Camera setup: Multi-camera
- Running time: 22 minutes

Original release
- Network: Zee Punjabi
- Release: 13 January 2020 – 3 June 2022

Related
- Majhya Navaryachi Bayko

Khasma Nu Khani (transl. Female Who Steal Others Husband) is an Indian Punjabi drama television series that premiered on 13 January 2020 on Zee Punjabi. It was produced under the banner of Eternal Frame Production and stars Harsimran Oberoi, Akshay Dhiman, Navdeesh Arora, Mridun Taksh and Sukhpreet in the lead roles. It is an official remake of Marathi TV series Majhya Navaryachi Bayko. It ended on 3 June 2022.

== Plot ==
The series depicts the life of Desho, whose life turns upside down on discovering her husband Armaan's illicit relationship with Simple.

== Cast ==
=== Main ===
- Harsimran Oberoi as Deshpreet Arora a.k.a. Desho, Armaan's wife (2020–2021)
- Akshay Dhiman as Ranveer Duggal (2021–2023)
- Sukhpreet as Simple Sharma, Armaan's love interest (2021–2022)
- Mridun Taksh as Shivam (2020–2022)
- Navdeesh Arora as Armaan Arora, Desho's husband (2020–2021)
  - Love Sandhu replaced Navdeesh Arora as Armaan Arora (2021–2022)

=== Recurring ===
- Roopi Maan as Mrs. Duggal (2020–2022)
- Raman Dagga as Jagpratap Arora (2020–2022)
- Anju Moga as Poonam Arora (2020–2022)
- Mohan Kant as Sandeep Gulati (2020–2022)
- Jasleen as Deshpreet's mother (2020–2022)
- Naveen Dhingra as Deshpreet's father (2020–2022)
- Minal as Upinder Singh (2020–2022)
- Nisha as Sandeep's wife (2020–2022)
- Shreeansh Sharma as Purab (2020–2022)
- Samsher Singh as Maakhan Singh (2020–2022)
- Harjeet as Renu (2020–2022)
- Onika Maan as Maaya Kapoor (2020–2022)
- Anjali as Sweety (2020–2022)
- Harry Basra as Gurvindar Nehra a.k.a. Guggu (2020–2022)
- Gurpreet Maan as Tarunpaal Gill (2020–2022)
- Gagaandeep as Lakhbir (2020–2022)
- Gagan as Maid's Daughter (2020–2022)
- Pushpak Dilnoor as Twinkle Gill (2020–2022)
- Neelam Handa as Parminder Nehra (2020–2022)
- Prashni as Guneet Gill (2020–2022)
- Sukhpal as Sartaj Nehra a.k.a. Jolly (2020–2022)
- Vikas Neb as Omkar, Armaan's boss (2020–2022)
- Mathlub khan as lawyer (2020–2022)

== Adaptations ==
Language	Title	Original release	Network(s)	Last aired	Notes
Marathi	Majhya Navaryachi Bayko माझ्या नवऱ्याची बायको	22 August 2016	Zee Marathi	7 March 2021	Original
Kannada	Subbalakshmi Samsara ಸಬ್ಬಲಕ್ಷ್ಮಿ ಸಂಸಾರ	12 June 2017	Zee Kannada	3 April 2020	Remake
Punjabi	Khasma Nu Khani ਖ਼ਸਮਾਂ ਨੂੰ ਖਾਣੀ	13 January 2020	Zee Punjabi	3 June 2022	Remake
