= Kamli Ishq Di =

Indian Punjabi television series

- Genre: Romance; Drama
- Written by: Siddharth Saini
- Story by: Anuksh Nagpal
- Directed by: Romi Sandhu
- Starring: See below
- Music by: Ritesh Gujrathi
- Country of origin: India
- Original language: Punjabi
- No. of episodes: 295

Production
- Editors: Rahul Singh; Guri Dhindsa
- Camera setup: Multi-camera
- Running time: 22 minutes
- Production company: Reliance Big Synergy

Original release
- Network: Zee Punjabi
- Release: 13 January 2020 – 11 June 2021

Related
- Lagira Zala Ji

Kamli Ishq Di (Punjabi pronunciation: [kə.məɭi: ɪʃ(ə̆)kə̆ diː]) is an Indian Punjabi language Drama television series that premiered from 13 January 2020 on Zee Punjabi. It starred Jashan Singh Kohli and Sehar Shehnaz in the lead roles. It is an official remake of Marathi TV series Lagira Zala Ji. It is produced by Reliance Big Synergy and ended on 11 June 2021.

== Plot ==
A free-spirited Mahi falls in love with Veer, who aspires to join the Indian Army.

== Cast ==
- Jashan Singh Kohli as Veer
- Sehar Shehnaz as Mahi
- Mandeep Kaur
- Navtaran Singh
- Sandeep Kapoor
- Rajinder Rozy

== Adaptations ==
Language	Title	Original release	Network(s)	Last aired	Notes
Marathi	Lagira Zala Ji लागिरं झालं जी	1 May 2017	Zee Marathi	22 June 2019	Original
Bengali	Rangiye Diye Jao রাঙিয়ে দিয়ে যাও	11 December 2017	Zee Bangla	15 June 2018	Remake
Punjabi	Kamli Ishq Di ਕਮਲੀ ਇਸ਼ਕ ਦੀ	13 January 2020	Zee Punjabi	11 June 2021	Remake
Kannada	Tisa Ka Na Nisa ಟೀಸಾ ಕೆ ನಾ ನಿಶಾ	TBA	Zee Kannada	Upcoming	Remake
