= Tumchya Aamchyatali Kusum =

Marathi-language drama TV series

- Genre: Drama; Romance
- Created by: Ekta Kapoor
- Developed by: Ekta Kapoor
- Screenplay by: Ekta Kapoor
- Story by: Ekta Kapoor
- Starring: See below
- Country of origin: India
- Original language: Marathi
- No. of episodes: 129

Production
- Producers: Ekta Kapoor; Shobha Kapoor
- Production locations: Mumbai, Maharashtra
- Camera setup: Multi-camera
- Running time: 22 minutes
- Production company: Balaji Telefilms

Original release
- Network: Sony Marathi
- Release: 4 October 2021 – 26 February 2022

Related
- Kkusum

Tumchya Aamchyatali Kusum (transl. Yours Ours Kusum) is an Indian Marathi-language drama series, starred Shivani Baokar and Ajinkya Nanaware. Produced by Ekta Kapoor under the banner of Balaji Telefilms, it premiered from 4 October 2021 on Sony Marathi, replacing Swarajyajanani Jijamata. The series ended on 26 February 2022. It is an official remake of Hindi TV series Kkusum.

== Plot ==
Kusum is a story of a young, beautiful and charming girl with a golden heart. Kusum is very positive in her attitude and always looks at the silver lining of dark clouds. She is grounded – very responsible and carries herself with a graceful and reassuring smile. She doesn't give up on the responsibilities of her parental home and even after marriage continues to be strong support for her parents. The grace with which she manages her marital home, her parents' home and her career make her inspirational and relatable to every woman.

== Cast ==
- Shivani Baokar as Kusum
- Ajinkya Nanaware as Anuj
- Ketaki Palav as Elisha
- Rahul Mehendale
- Shilpa Navalkar
- Mohiniraj Gatne
- Aarti More
- Vedangi Kulkarni
- Pradnya Jadhav
- Yash Pradhan

== Adaptations ==
Language	Title	Original release	Network(s)	Last aired	Notes
Hindi	Kkusum कुसुम	14 May 2001	SET	30 November 2005	Original
Marathi	Tumchya Aamchyatali Kusum तुमच्या आमच्यातली कुसुम	4 October 2021	Sony Marathi	26 February 2022	Remake
