= Amit Dolawat =

Indian actor

- Born: 17 March 1980 (age 46); India
- Occupation: Actor
- Years active: 2003–present
- Spouse: Cheshta Sharma (m. 2017)
- Children: Nibhiv Dolawat (son)

Amit Dolawat is an Indian actor who works in television. He has also performed in a music video and a short film "Pita", also in the Music Video: Akhir Tumhein Aana Hai- Remix from Album: In search of Mirage by DJ Mohit.

== Personal life ==
Dolawat married his long-time girlfriend, Cheshta Sharma, on 14 February 2017.

== Television ==
Year	Show	Character	Notes
2005–2006	Piya Ka Ghar	Soham Sharma	
2006–2007	Kesar	Krish Maliya	
2005–2006	Miilee	Swami	
2006–2009	Ghar Ki Lakshmi Betiyann	Dev Singhania / Prince	
2006–2008	Zaara	Sagar	
2007	Saat Phere: Saloni Ka Safar	Shridhar	
2007–2008	Main Aisi Kyunn Hoon	Vicky Mehta	
2008–2009	Lo Ho Gayi Pooja Iss Ghar Ki	Aman	
2009	Yeh Rishta Kya Kehlata Hai	Alok Awasthi	
2014–2015	Yeh Rishta Kya Kehlata Hai	Alok Awasthi	
2011	Runuzunu	Dr. Kedar	
2011	Hi! Padosi... Kaun Hai Doshi?	Maanav	
2012	Sasural Genda Phool	Abhishek	
2012	Shubh Vivah	Amardeep	
2015	Diya Aur Baati Hum	Himanshu Dubey	
2016	Agent Raghav – Crime Branch	Vijay Chauhan	
2016	Badi Door Se Aaye Hai	Samar Ghotala	
2015–2016	Pyaar Ko Ho Jaane Do	Vikrant Singh	
2017	Kalash - Ek Vishwaas		Cameo
2017	Icchapyari Naagin	Makrant	
2017–2018	Dev - TV series	Inspector Amod Narvekar	
2018	Khichdi Season 3		
2018	Tenali Rama	Bala	Cameo
2019	Ishq Subhan Allah	Aariaz	
2019	Karn Sangini	Lord Krishna	
2019	Divya Drishti	Sarthak Sharma	
2020	Bhakharwadi	Apratim Joshi / Munna Pandey	Episodic Role
2021	Janani	Ravi	
2021	Nave Lakshya	Arjun Karandikar	Lead Role
2021	Maddam Sir	Arjun Baba	Cameo
2023	Swaraj	Kanhu Murmu	Episodic Role
2023	Maharashtra Shahir	Sane Guruji	
2024	Premachi Gosht		Supporting Role
2024	Jhanak	Advocate Deepashish Roy	Supporting Role
2025	Kabhi Neem Neem Kabhi Shahad Shahad	Shlok Jindal	
2025	Wagle Ki Duniya – Nayi Peedhi Naye Kissey	A Cid officer	Guest
2025	Itti Si Khushi	Raghu	Supporting Role
2026	Anupamaa	Kunal	
2026	Juhi Mui	Mukul Ahlawat	
