= Lagira Zala Ji =

2017 Indian Marathi language TV series

- Genre: Drama
- Written by: Tejpal Wagh
- Directed by: Sanjay Khambe
- Starring: See below
- Theme music composer: AV Prafullachandra
- Opening theme: Lakhat Ek Majha Fauji
- Country of origin: India
- Original language: Marathi
- No. of episodes: 682

Production
- Producers: Shweta Shinde; Sanjay Khambe
- Production locations: Chandwadi, Satara, Maharashtra
- Running time: 22 minutes
- Production company: Vajra Production

Original release
- Network: Zee Marathi
- Release: 1 May 2017 – 22 June 2019

Lagira Zala Ji is an Indian Marathi language television drama series which aired on Zee Marathi. It premiered from 1 May 2017 by replacing Jai Malhar. It is produced by Shweta Shinde under the banner of Vajra Production. It starred Nitish Chavan and Shivani Baokar in lead roles. It ended on 22 June 2019 completing 682 episodes.

== Plot ==
It is the story of an orphaned Ajinkya Shinde belonging to a small village near Satara. He is a dedicated follower of Maratha king Shivaji and dreams of joining the Indian Army and serving the nation, for which he is preparing himself to achieve. Ajinkya has already lost his parents in a mine explosion and live with his maternal uncle, aunt, grandma and cousin sister. Since he lost his parents in an explosion, he wants to be in the army and fight against the terrorists. If needed, then he is even ready to sacrifice his own life for his country. That is his ideology. Sheetal is Ajinkya's love interest. Ajinkya and Sheetal, in spite of sparkling chemistry between themselves, cannot stand each other's presence. But slowly they fall in love. Later on, Sheetal's family arranges her marriage with Harshvardhan Deshmukh, who turns out to be an illegal arms businessman. On the other side, Ajinkya gets chance in army training. Ajinkya works with the army to capture Harshvardhan and succeeds. Ajinkya marries Sheetal under the situation.

== Cast ==
=== Main ===
- Shivani Baokar as Sheetal Surendra Pawar / Sheetal Ajinkya Shinde
- Nitish Chavan as Fauji Ajinkya Shinde (Ajya)

=== Recurring ===
Bhoite family

- Kiran Dhane / Purva Shinde as Jayashri Samadhan Bhoite / Jayashri Harshvardhan Deshmukh (Jaydi)
- Vidya Sawale / Kalyani Chaudhari as Pushpa Samadhan Bhoite
- Santosh Patil as Samadhan Bhoite
- Kamal Thoke as Jiji

Pawar family

- Devendra Deo as Surendra Shivram Pawar (Nana)
- Daya Eksambekar as Usha Surendra Pawar
- Saurabh Bhise as Saurabh Surendra Pawar
- Dhondiram Karande as Appa Shivram Pawar
- Manjusha Khetri as Neelam Appa Pawar
- Sandip Jangam as Jitendra Shivram Pawar (Jitu)
- Shivani Ghatge as Suman Jitendra Pawar
- Dhruv Gosavi as Dhruv Jitendra Pawar

Deshmukh family

- Kiran Gaikwad as Harshvardhan Yuvraj Deshmukh (Bhaiyyasaheb)
- Yogini Pophale as Pratibha Yuvraj Deshmukh / Pratibha Pratapsingh Jagtap (Taisaheb)
- Bharati Dole as Aaisaheb
- Vedraj Anapat as Sangramsingh Pratapsingh Jagtap (Simba)
- Mahesh Jadhav as Mahesh (Talent)

=== Others ===
Fauji

- Nikhil Chavan as Vikram Raut (Vikya)
- Vikram Gaikwad aa Dheeraj Nikam
- Pradeep Kothmire as Ajay Desai
- Mahesh Ghag as Hanumant Phadtare
- Shriram Lokhande as Abhay Marane
- Aniket Lad as Pashya
- Varinder Singh as Sardarji
- Amit Kulkarni as K.K.
- Arjun Kusumbe as Shailesh
- Sumeet Pusavale as Sumit
- Rahul Jagtap as Rahul

Villagers

- Rahul Magdum as Rahul Ravindra Tate
- Nilima Kamane as Neelima Ravindra Tate
- Amarnath Kharade as Jameer (Jamya)
- Laxmi Vibhute as Yasmin
- Prafullkumar Kamble as Rafiq
- Trupti Navale as Amina
- Saya Kashid as Pooja
- Kiran Dalvi as Gotya
- Rukmini Sutar as Radha
- Sachin Hagavane-Patil
- Shekhar Sawant
- Anita Chavan
- Ashok Gurav
- Bhakti Zanzane
- Abhishek Vernekar

== Reception ==
=== Special episode (1 hour) ===
- 22 July 2018
- 2 September 2018
- 6 January 2019

=== Ratings ===
Week	Year	BARC Viewership		Ref.
Week	Year	TRP	Rank	Ref.
Week 27	2017	2.0	5	
Week 31	2017	2.7	4	
Week 37	2017	3.5	3	
Week 49	2017	3.8	3	
Week 15	2018	2.5	4	
Week 19	2018	3.1	3	
Week 34	2018	3.4	5	
Week 25	2019	3.2	4	
Week 26	2019	5.7	1	

== Adaptations ==
Language	Title	Original release	Network(s)	Last aired	Notes
Marathi	Lagira Zala Ji लागिरं झालं जी	1 May 2017	Zee Marathi	22 June 2019	Original
Bengali	Rangiye Diye Jao রাঙিয়ে দিয়ে যাও	11 December 2017	Zee Bangla	15 June 2018	Remake
Punjabi	Kamli Ishq Di ਕਮਲੀ ਇਸ਼ਕ ਦੀ	13 January 2020	Zee Punjabi	11 June 2021	Remake

== Awards ==
Zee Marathi Utsav Natyancha Awards
Year	Category	Recipient	Ref.
2017	Best Series	Shweta Shinde & Sanjay Khambe	
2017	Best Actress	Shivani Baokar	
2017	Best Couple	Shivani Baokar-Nitish Chavan	
2017	Best Title Song	AV Prafullachandra	
2017	Best Character Male	Rahul Magdum	
2017	Best Supporting Male	Nikhil Chavan	
2017	Best Supporting Female	Kiran Dhane	
2017	Best Father	Devendra Deo	
2017	Best Grandmother	Kamal Thoke	
2017	Best Child Character	Dhruv Gosavi	
2018	Best Comedy Character	Rahul Magdum	
2018	Best Negative Actor	Kiran Gaikwad	
