= Aabhalmaya =

Indian television series

- Genre: Indian Soap Opera; Drama
- Written by: Vinay Apte; Abhitem Joshi
- Directed by: Vinay Apte; Mandar Devasthali
- Starring: See below
- Theme music composer: Ashok Patki
- Country of origin: India
- Original language: Marathi
- No. of seasons: 2
- No. of episodes: 699

Production
- Producer: Achyut Vaze
- Production locations: Mumbai, Maharashtra
- Camera setup: Multi-camera
- Running time: 22 minutes
- Production company: Magic Box Production

Original release
- Network: Alpha TV Marathi
- Release: 16 August 1999 – 4 July 2003

Aabhalmaya (transl. Skylove) is an Indian Marathi language television series which was aired on Alpha TV Marathi. It starred Sukanya Kulkarni, Manoj Joshi and Sanjay Mone in lead roles.

== Seasons ==
Season	Episodes	Originally Broadcast	
Season	Episodes	First aired	Last aired
1	475	16 August 1999	8 June 2001
2	224	19 August 2002	4 July 2003

== Plot ==
The story revolves around the Professor Sudha Joshi teacher in Ratanbai College, whose family includes her husband Sharad who is also a professor, and they have two daughters Akansha and Anushka. When Sharad falls in love with another Professor Chitra with whom he has a one daughter named Chingi, it leads to a rift in the family.

== Cast ==
=== Main ===
- Sukanya Kulkarni as Sudha Joshi; professor from Ratanbai college, Sharad's wife, Akansha & Anushka's mother, Chingi's stepmother
- Manoj Joshi as Sharad Joshi; Sudha's husband & Chitra's love interest, Akansha, Anushka & Chingi's father
- Sanjay Mone as Jaya Nimkar; Sudha's colleague
- Atisha Naik as Chitra; Sharad's love interest, Chingi's mother
- Shweta Sane as Varsha Nimkar
  - Mukta Barve replacing sane as Varsha Nimkar
- Shubhangi Joshi as Akka
- Mugdha Godbole as Akansha Joshi; Sudha and Sharad's daughter
  - Sanjyot Hardikar-Pawar replacing godbole as Akansha Joshi
- Pari Telang as Anushka Joshi; Sudha and Sharad's daughter
  - Manava Naik replacing Pari Telang as elder Anushka Joshi
    - Sameera Kumari replacing Manava Naik as elder Anushka Joshi
- Swarangi Marathe as young (Chingi) Akshata Joshi; Sudhir and Chitra's daughter
  - Ketaki Thatte replacing marathe as elder (Chingi) Akshata Joshi
    - Chaitrali Chirmule-Gupte as elder (Chingi) Akshata Joshi
- Harshada Khanvilkar as Sushma; Sukanya's sister
- Ankush Chaudhari as Sunny; Sushma's husband

=== Recurring ===
- Bhushan Dhupkar as Bunty
  - Umesh Kamat as Bunty
- Shaila Sawant-Kanekar as Prof. Sunanda Sonawane
- Swati Apte as Prof. Ranganekar
- Vijay Patwardhan as Prof. Ghatpande
- Ajit Kelkar as Prof. Gawaskar
- Uday Sabnis as Manna Pradhan
- Pratibha Goregaonkar as Seema
- Prashant Deshpande as Kiran
  - Rahul Mehendale as Kiran
- Purnima Patil as Pallavi
  - Rujuta Deshmukh as Pallavi
- Amod Oak as Bhushan
  - Rutuj Kulkarni as Bhushan
- Sunita Gore as Aaji
- Prasad Pandit as Arvind Mahajan
- Smita Oak as Sarita Mahajan
- Parag Bedekar as Nishant
  - Shreyas Talpade as Nishant Mahajan
- Meena Naik as Kalyani Shirodkar
- Avishkar as Virendra Shirodkar
- Kshama Ninawe as Nutan Shirodkar
- Irawati Lagoo as Priti Shirodkar
- Ashok Sathe as Mr. Kulkarni
- Prasad Oak as Suhas Dani
- Jayant Ghate as Vishwanath
- Vilas Ujawane as Bhai Shelar
- Hridaynath Rane as Aaba
- Vivek Gore as Inspector Jayesh Chorghade
- Ramdas Jadhav as Inspector Mane
- Ravindra Berde as Mr. Thorat
- Kshitij Zarapkar as Mr. Chandekar
- Asawari Paranjape as Mrunal Dhurandhar
- Shivaji Raut as Abhay Dhurandhar
- Ganesh Pai as Manoj Kapadiya
- Sonali Khare as Reshma Kapadiya
- Neha Bam as Meera Yerawar
- Arun Mohare as Khanderao Yerawar
- Sachin Khedekar as Shrirang Yerawar
- Suhas Naware as Karbhari
- Vinay Apte as Yashwant Pawar (Kaka)
- Arun Nalawade as Anna
- Atharva Gharpure as Tanvir
- Vedvati as Mohini
- Swanandi Tikekar as Varsha
- Sunil Tawade as Nachiket
- Milind Phatak as Kaushik
- Jagdish as C.P. Wagale
- Anil Bhandare as Pratap More
- Ajit Bhagat as Manohar Warang
- Jagannath Kandalgaonkar as Mr. Kharshikar
- Raju Patwardhan as Shipai
- Prabhakar Pawar as Ramesh
- Mahesh Subhedar as Eknath
- Ashok Sawant as Mr. Deshpande
- Subodh Bhave as Inspector Mohan
- Shweta Mehendale as Reva
- Bharati Patil as Inspector
