= H.M. Bane T.M. Bane =

Marathi-language drama TV series

- Genre: Drama
- Written by: Amol Patil
- Directed by: Sachin Gokhale
- Starring: See below
- Country of origin: India
- Original language: Marathi
- No. of episodes: 553

Production
- Production locations: Mumbai, Maharashtra, India
- Camera setup: Multi-camera
- Running time: 22 minutes

Original release
- Network: Sony Marathi
- Release: 22 August 2018 – 22 October 2020

H.M. Bane T.M. Bane is an Indian Marathi language drama series which aired on Sony Marathi. It starred Pradeep Velankar, Ujjwala Jog, Aditi Sarangdhar, Rani Gunaji, Ajinkya Joshi and Sachin Deshpande in lead roles. It is directed by Sachin Gokhale. It premiered from 22 August 2018 and ended on 22 October 2020 completing 553 episodes.

== Plot ==
It is a story of a joint family consisting of 2 brothers their wives, 3 kids and parents. The story is a positive take on staying together, which highlights that It's not that difficult to stay together.

== Cast ==
- Pradeep Velankar as Narayan Bane
- Ujjwala Jog as Sudha Narayan Bane
- Sachin Deshpande as Makarand Narayan Bane
- Rani Gunaji as Harshada Makarand Bane
- Ajinkya Joshi as Malhar Narayan Bane
- Aditi Sarangdhar as Tulika Malhar Bane
- Kedar Agaskar as Parth Malhar Bane
- Mugdha Godbole as Kadambari, Sharmili's mother
- Kshitee Jog as Meghana, Tulika's sister-in-law
- Sanjeevani Jadhav as Tulika's mother
- Suhas Palshikar as Tulika's father
- Satish Salagare
- Sameer Khandekar
- Umesh Damle as Pendse
- Sanket Korlekar as Jayesh Patel
- Ketaki Kulkarni as Sharmili
- Sakhi Datar
- Purvi Shah as Reha Makarand Bane
