= The Dark Side of Life: Mumbai City =

2018 film written and directed by Tariq Khan

- Directed by: Tariq Khan
- Written by: Nisar Akhtar; Tariq Khan
- Produced by: Rajesh Pardasani
- Edited by: Ajay Kaul
- Music by: Rashid Khan; Shaan Asif Raj; Prakash Prabhakar; Ehsaan Khan; Sabir Khan; Sandeep Batraa
- Production company: Lakshya Productions
- Distributed by: Panorama Studios; H.K Tandon Company; V.K Films; Mitali Films; Sanman Exhibitors; FilmShow Distribution
- Release date: 23 November 2018
- Running time: 123 mins
- Country: India
- Language: Hindi

The Dark Side of Life: Mumbai City is an Indian drama film released on 23 November 2018. The film is written and directed by Tariq Khan and is produced by Rajesh Pardasani under the banner of Lakshya Productions. The film marks the acting debut of veteran filmmaker Mahesh Bhatt who stars alongside actor Kay Kay Menon in the film.

== Plot ==
The Dark Side of Life: Mumbai City is a multi-plotted story which revolves around the lives of six individuals who are pushed to the brink of depression while battling their emotional and financial problems.

== Cast ==
- Mahesh Bhatt as Zulfiqar Hussain
- Kay Kay Menon as Sumit Balsaria
- Neha Khan as Kavya
- Alisha Khan as Zohra
- Avii pardasni as Prince
- Deepraj Rana as Warren Lobo
- Nikhil Ratnaparkhi as Anand
- Jyoti Malshe as Parul
- Gul Hameed as Kadambari

== Soundtrack ==
The Dark Side of Life: Mumbai City

Soundtrack album by Jubin Nautiyal, Prakash Prabhakar and Sabri Brothers
- Released: 23 November 2018
- Genre: Feature film soundtrack
- Length: 24:35
- Language: Hindi
- Label: T-Series

The film's soundtrack was produced by various artists, The film had six original songs. The theme of the film, "Aawargi" was sung by Jubin Nautiyal and composed by Sabir Khan and the lyrics were helmed by Azeem Shirazi. Other songs include "Tu Mujhse Nilkalta Nahi", "Ae Zindagi", "Muddaton", "Saanp Seedi Wala Saanp" (promotional song) and "Aawargi Deewangi". The album received a mainly-positive response from critics, especially the song "Aawargi" was appreciated.

Track listing
No.	Title	Singer(s)	Length
1.	"Aawargi"	Jubin Nautiyal	3:25
2.	"Tu Mujhse Nikalta Nahi"	Prakash Prabhakar	3:27
3.	"Saano Seedi Wala Saanp"	Tripti Sinha	2:00
4.	"Ae Zindagi"	Aftab Hashim Sabri Brothers	3:37
5.	"Muddaton"	Amit Mishra	3:37
6.	"Aawargi Deewangi"	Mohammed Irfan	5:13
Total length:			24:35
