= Devmanus (TV series) =

2020 Indian Marathi language TV series

- Genre: Thriller, crime
- Based on: Santosh Pol
- Screenplay by: Swapnil Gangurde
- Directed by: Raju Sawant; Amit Sawardekar
- Starring: See below
- Theme music composer: Rohit Nagbhide
- Country of origin: India
- Original language: Marathi
- No. of seasons: 3
- No. of episodes: 301

Production
- Producers: Shweta Shinde; Sanjay Khambe
- Production locations: Satara, Maharashtra, India
- Cinematography: Sachin Patekar
- Camera setup: Multi-camera
- Running time: 22 minutes
- Production company: Vajra Production

Original release
- Network: Zee Marathi
- Release: 31 August 2020 – 15 August 2021

Related
- Devmanus 2 Devmanus Madhla Adhyay

Devmanus (transl. God Figure) is an Indian Marathi language crime thriller television series which aired on Zee Marathi. It premiered from 31 August 2020 by replacing Ratris Khel Chale 2. It starred Kiran Gaikwad and Asmita Deshmukh in lead roles. It is produced by Shweta Shinde and directed by Raju Sawant under the banner of Vajra Production.

It is supposedly inspired by a true story. Santosh Pol, dubbed "Dr. Death" by the media, was a notorious doctor who killed 6 people in 13 years of his practice in the town of Satara.

== Series ==
Season	Episodes	Originally Broadcast	
Season	Episodes	First aired	Last aired
1	301	31 August 2020	15 August 2021
2	236	19 December 2021	10 September 2022
3	present	2 June 2025	Ongoing

== Plot ==
A police inspector makes a criminal confess his crimes, then the story goes into the past. A constable chides a man for giving false hopes of a role in films in Mumbai to Dimple. Meanwhile, When a doctor catches a compounder (who later becomes a quack doctor) stealing money from his patients, he injures the doctor and runs away. Later, Dimple returns to her village, her mother beats her with a broom. Then, Dr. Ajitkumar Dev (compounder-turned-fake doctor) arrives at their Wada. Mangal (Dimple's mother) tells Dr. Ajitkumar Dev that Babu (Dimple's father) has not opened his eyes. Babu feels overwhelmed and tells his story to Ajitkumar. Mangal tells Babu to call Ajitkumar to stay in their house.

After that, Ajitkumar gets scared when he sees Rupali (Ajitkumar's friend) in the clinic. Reshma, a sarkar's wife, pours heart out to Ajitkumar. Furious on learning the truth about Ajitkumar, Rupali confronts him. When he refuses to marry her, she threatens him. After that, in aggression Ajitkumar kills Rupali and buries her under a concrete bench near his clinic. Ajitkumar sweet talks Reshma into eloping with him taking Vijay's (Reshma's husband) money and jewellery. Reshma refuses to get Ajitkumar out of Vijay's house. As Vijay comes after her, she strikes him on the head with a flowerpot. After that, he also kills Reshma because he deceives her for money and he doesn't love her. Mangal matches the marriage of Dimple with Mahesh, but Dimple refuses to married. She blackmails Ajitkumar and asks him to break her marriage alliance because Dimple collects the dead body of Reshma from Ajitkumar's room and keeps it a secret. So, Ajitkumar gets ready to break her marriage. A confusion creates Ajitkumar leading to a fight and Dimple's marriage gets called off. Later, Ajitkumar asks Dimple about Reshma's dead body. Dimple talks about her goals and ambitions with Ajitkumar and tells him that she helps him in every crime. After that, Ajitkumar also killed Aparna and her mother for money.

Later, everyone is happy as Manjula comes to the village. Mangal introduces Manjula to Ajitkumar. Manjula gives a fitting reply to Ajitkumar, who tries to get close to her. Manjula apologises to Ajitkumar and tells him the reason behind her actions. Manjula asks Namya to get medication from Mumbai on the promise that he won't tell anyone. Manjula tells Aaji the truth about her husband. The villagers gossip bad about Manjula. Villagers ask Ajitkumar to talk sense into Manjula and tell him to oust her from the village if she fails to budge. The villagers protest at Manjula's house asking her to leave the village. Manjula introduces her husband who is in a wheelchair, shocking everyone. Manjula and her husband roam around the village and meet with Aaji at the Wada. The villagers apologise to Manjula. Later, Manjula and Ajitkumar bury their hatchets and start afresh. Ajitkumar meets with Suresh to convince him to not buy Manjula's land. Manjula, Amar and Sanju wait for Suresh at the office, but Ajitkumar kills Suresh.

Dimple notices the blood on Ajitkumar's shoe and confronts him about it. After that, an altercation happened between Ajitkumar and Sanju. So, Ajitkumar kills Sanju also and buried him behind the Wada. At that time, Aaji came to that location, but she doesn't know who buried Sanju. Next day, Aaji called the police and they came to that location. Police got the dead body of the dog because Dimple replaced Sanju's body. Afterwards, Dimple, Ajitkumar and Manjula went to Mahabaleshwar. Ajitkumar won to take space in Manjula's mind in those days. A few days later the doctor proposed to Manjula and forced her and Manjula found out the true nature of the doctor. The doctor started harassing Manjula but Manjula did not tell anyone about it. A few days later, the doctor comes to Manjula's house and gets the land deed signed by Manjula's husband and goes to their kitchen and turns on the gas regulator in her house. After a while she comes into the house and goes into the kitchen and turns on the gas and there is a very big explosion and she burns and dies.

A few days later, a lady inspector Divya Singh comes to the village with her daughter Myra to solve Manjula's case. Seeing Divya makes the doctor's mind light up and the doctor falls in love with her. Mangal decides Dimple's marriage with Ajitkumar. Ajitkumar refuses, but Dimple gets ready to marry him. A few days later, Rupali's father comes to the village in search of Rupali. When the doctor finds out that Rupali's father has come to the village, the doctor plots to kill him. One day the doctor calls him to his clinic and puts a flower pot on his head while talking to him but he is not dead. The doctor tries to get close to Divya but is unsuccessful, so he makes a plan to reach her through Myra (Divya's daughter). He traps Myra in his trap and convinces Myra that he is her second dad and Myra agrees and tells the Divya that this is my dad from today. A few days later, the Doctor kills Rupali's father by drinking alcohol. After that, police confirm news that Dr. Ajitkumar is Devisingh. So, they try to collect information about him from Dimple.

When the Doctor knows about it, he plans to go to Mumbai to save the Police. But, when he went to the bus stand, he got news that Police collected all about his past information and they came to the village to catch some clues about the doctor. Police get information about Doctor's truth through Dimple. So, Doctor goes to the Police officer's house with the help of Dimple and kills him using an injection and a gun. Also, Dimple knows about Ajitkumar's truth that he is not a doctor, he is a compounder. Slowly, the Doctor pulls Divya into the trap of love and Divya falls in love with the doctor. The doctor's plan finally succeeds. A few days later, Mangal and Babu decide to marry Dimple and the doctor, but the doctor does not approve because Divya loves the doctor. Eventually, the doctor gets ready to marry Dimple then Divya also approves this relation and starts her case. She takes the fingerprints of some people including the doctor and the doctor's fingerprints match and Divya finds some evidence which makes her realise that the doctor is Devisingh.

Ajitkumar and Dimple get married and that time Divya leads the Ajitkumar from the wedding tent and he is arrested but the villagers stand firmly by the Ajitkumar, but Divya still does not leave him. Eventually, the case goes to court and Advocate Aarya Deshmukh is appointed to fight against Ajitkumar. Aarya presents evidence in court against Devi Singh and after looking at all the evidence, the Judge gives an opportunity to Ajitkumar to cross-examine. At the same time, when Dimple comes to meet Ajit Kumar in jail, Devisingh tells his secret story to Dimple that Dr. Ajit Kumar Dev is his twin brother and he too was killed by him. After due to lack of evidence Ajit Kumar was released from jail.

== Cast ==
=== Main ===
- Kiran Gaikwad as Dr. Ajitkumar Chandrakant Dev / Devisingh
- Asmita Deshmukh as Sagarika Babu Patil (Dimple)

=== Recurring ===
Dimple's family

- Anjali Joglekar as Mangal Babu Patil - Dimple's mother
- Ankush Mandekar as Babu Rangrao Patil - Dimple's father
- Viral Mane as Shubhankar Babu Patil (Tonya) - Dimple's brother
- Rukmini Sutar as Saru Patil - Dimple's grandmother
- Pushpa Choudhari as Vandi - Dimple's aunt
- Shashi Doiphode as Lala - Dimple's uncle

Others

- Neha Khan as ACP Divya Singh
- Sonali Patil as Advocate Aarya Deshmukh
- Ajinkya Date as Inspector Amit Shinde
- Satyawan Shikhare as Police Viraj Shikhare
- Arjun Kusumbe as ACP Ranjit Chavan
- Rajratna Waghmare as Judge
- Sanjana Kale as Rinku
- Madhuri Pawar as Chanda
- Pratiksha Jadhav as Manjula Amar Sankpal
- Mimicharvi Khadse as Myra Singh
- Vardhan Deshpande as Amar Sankpal
- Kiran Dange as Bajarang Patil (Bajya)
- Kabir Gaikwad as Krish
- Nilesh Gaware as Namdev Jadhav (Namya)
- Vansh Shah as Vitthal
- Sagar Korade as Sanjay
- Eknath Gite as Vijay Shinde
- Gayatri Bansode as Reshma Vijay Shinde
- Tejal Shinde as Dimple's friend
- Ravina Gogawale as Ravina Bajrang Patil
- Rutuja Pawar as Rani
- Deepali Jadhav as Rupali
- Aishwarya Nagesh as Aparna
- Sachin Hagvane-Patil as Suresh Patil
- Kulbhushan Palkar as Mahesh

== Production ==
=== Filming ===
In April 2021, curfew was announced in Maharashtra due to increased COVID cases, while the production halted in Satara. Hence, the production location was shifted temporarily to Nipani, Karnataka.

=== Casting ===
Kiran Gaikwad was selected to play Dr. Ajitkumar Dev. Asmita Deshmukh was selected to play Dimple. Pratiksha Jadhav was selected to play Manjula. Neha Khan was selected for the role of ACP Divya Singh. Sonali Patil was cast for the role of Advocate Arya Deshmukh.

== Reception ==
=== Sequel ===
The channel and production house rolled out another sequel with 4 months of its closure. The show premiered from 19 December 2021. Kiran Gaikwad is being retained for the titular role of Dr. Ajitkumar Dev (Devmanus). Few new characters were a part of this sequel. It replaced the horror show Ti Parat Aaliye. The story of the show will be a continuation of its first season.

=== Special episodes ===
1 hour

- 17 January 2021

2 hours

1. 21 March 2021 (Ajitkumar's truth reveal)
2. 30 May 2021 (Ajitkumar's murder mystery)
3. 15 August 2021 (Last episode)

=== Ratings ===
Week	Year	BARC Viewership		Ref.
Week	Year	TRP	Rank	Ref.
Week 13	2021	3.9	5	
Week 16	2021	3.6	2	
Week 18	2021	3.9	5	
Week 22	2021	5.3	4	

=== Dubbed version ===
Language	Title	Original release	Network(s)	Last aired	Ref.
Hindi	Haiwan हैवान	24 September 2022	And TV	30 April 2023	

== Awards ==
Zee Marathi Utsav Natyancha Awards 2020-21
Category	Recipient	Role	Ref.
Best Negative Actor	Kiran Gaikwad	Ajitkumar Dev (Devisingh)	
Best Character Male	Kiran Gaikwad	Ajitkumar Dev (Devisingh)	
Best Character Female	Rukmini Sutar	Saru Aaji	
Best Comedy Female	Rukmini Sutar	Saru Aaji	
Best Comedy Male	Viral Mane	Shubhankar (Tonya)	
