= Santosh Pol =

Indian quack doctor and serial killer

Santosh Pol (born 4 November 1974) is an Indian quack doctor who confessed to killing six people from 2003 to 2016 in the town of Dhom, Maharashtra, allegedly by injecting them with succinylcholine, a neuro-muscular paralytic drug. He was dubbed Dr. Death by the media for the incident.

The names of his victims are Mangala Jedhe, Salma Shaikh, Jagabai Pol, Surekha Chikane, Vanita Gaikwad and Nathmal Bhandari.

== In popular culture ==
In the 2020 Marathi television series Devmanus, Kiran Gaikwad's character Dr. Ajitkumar Dev is mainly based on Santosh Pol's life.

== See also ==
- List of serial killers by country
