= Shivani Baokar =

Indian actress

- Born: 11 March 1994 (age 32); Mumbai, Maharashtra, India
- Education: D. G. Ruparel College
- Occupation: Actress
- Years active: 2017–present
- Known for: Lagira Zala Ji

Shivani Baokar (born 11 March 1994) is an Indian film and television actress. She known for her role in Lagira Zala Ji.

== Early life and education ==
Shivani Boakar was born in Mumbai, Maharashtra. She grew up in Matunga, Dadar and Mahim areas of Mumbai. She did her graduation from DG Ruparel College, Mumbai. She is a German language expert. After insistence of parents, she decided to quit her job and pursue a career in film industry.

== Filmography ==
=== Films ===
Key
†	Denotes films that have not yet been released

Year	Movie	Role	Language	Ref.
2017	Undga	Meera	Marathi	
2019	Youth Tube	Prachi	Marathi	
2022	Gulhar	Shilpi	Marathi	
2024	Neta Geeta	Shruti	Marathi	
TBA	Girlfriend Boyfriend †	TBA	Marathi	

=== Television ===
Year	Show	Role(s)	Notes	Channel	Ref.
2017–2019	Lagira Zala Ji	Sheetal Pawar-Shinde	Lead Role	Zee Marathi	
2019–2020	Alti Palti Sumdit Kalti	Pallavi	Lead Role	Zee Marathi	
2020–2021	Manmandira Gajar Bhakticha	Host	Mythology Show	Zee Talkies	
2020–2021	Chala Hawa Yeu Dya Ladies Zindabad	Contestant	Comedy Show	Zee Marathi	
2021–2022	Tumchya Aamchyatali Kusum	Kusum Deshmukh-Sarnobat	Lead Role	Sony Marathi	
2023	Lavangi Mirchi	Asmita Patil	Lead Role	Zee Marathi	
2024–2026	Sadhi Manasa	Meera	Lead Role	Star Pravah	

==== Special appearances ====
Year	Title	Role	Ref.
2017	Zee Marathi Utsav Natyancha Awards 2017	Guest as Sheetal	
2017	Chala Hawa Yeu Dya	Guest as Sheetal	
2017	Sa Re Ga Ma Pa Marathi	Guest as Sheetal	
2018	Chala Hawa Yeu Dya	Guest as Sheetal	
2018	Jallosh Ganrayacha 2018	Guest as Sheetal	
2018	Aamhi Saare Khavayye	Guest as Sheetal	
2018	Zee Marathi Utsav Natyancha Awards 2018	Guest as Sheetal	
2019	Chala Hawa Yeu Dya	Guest as Pallavi	
2019	Zee Marathi Utsav Natyancha Awards 2019	Guest as Pallavi	
2019	Yuva Dancing Queen	Guest as Herself	
2020	Jai Jai Maharashtra Majha	Guest as Herself	
2020	Zee Yuva Sanman	Guest as Herself	
2020–21	Zee Marathi Utsav Natyancha Awards 2020-21	Guest as Herself	
2021	Sony Marathi Kutumba Diwali Sohala	Guest as Kusum	
2022	Sakal Sanman 2022	Guest as Herself	

=== Music video ===
Year	Title	Roles	Ref.
2019	"Khulach Zhalo Ga"	Urvi	
2020	"Chahul"		
2020	"Barasu De"		
2021	"Vedya Manala"		
2021	"Lajtana"		
2021	"Lagnachi Pipani"		
2022	"Nate Navyane"	Myra	

== Awards and nominations ==
Year	Awards	Categories	Shows	Result	Ref.
2017	Zee Marathi Utsav Natyancha Awards 2017	Best Actress	Lagira Zala Ji	Won	
2017	Zee Marathi Utsav Natyancha Awards 2017	Best Couple	Lagira Zala Ji	Won	
2017	Zee Marathi Utsav Natyancha Awards 2017	Best Daughter-in-law	Lagira Zala Ji	Nominated	
2017	Zee Marathi Utsav Natyancha Awards 2017	Waman Hari Pethe Jewellers Best Face of the Year	Lagira Zala Ji	Nominated	
2017	Zee Marathi Utsav Natyancha Awards 2017	Best Debutant Female	Lagira Zala Ji	Won	
2018	Zee Marathi Utsav Natyancha Awards 2018	Best Actress	Lagira Zala Ji	Nominated	
2018	Zee Marathi Utsav Natyancha Awards 2018	Best Couple	Lagira Zala Ji	Nominated	
2018	Zee Marathi Utsav Natyancha Awards 2018	Best Daughter-in-law	Lagira Zala Ji	Nominated	
2018	Zee Marathi Utsav Natyancha Awards 2018	Waman Hari Pethe Jewellers Best Face of the Year	Lagira Zala Ji	Nominated	
2019	Zee Marathi Utsav Natyancha Awards 2019	Best Actress	Alti Palti Sumdit Kalti	Nominated	
2019	Zee Marathi Utsav Natyancha Awards 2019	Best Couple	Alti Palti Sumdit Kalti	Nominated	
2019	Zee Marathi Utsav Natyancha Awards 2019	Best Daughter-in-law	Alti Palti Sumdit Kalti	Nominated	
2019	Zee Marathi Utsav Natyancha Awards 2019	Waman Hari Pethe Jewellers Best Face of the Year	Alti Palti Sumdit Kalti	Nominated	
