= Ti Parat Aaliye =

2021 Indian Marathi TV show

- Genre: Horror
- Created by: Zee Marathi
- Written by: Swapnil Gangurde
- Directed by: Ankush Marode (Aniket karpe)
- Starring: See below
- Country of origin: India
- Original language: Marathi
- No. of episodes: 107

Production
- Camera setup: Multi-camera
- Running time: 22 minutes

Original release
- Network: Zee Marathi
- Release: 16 August – 18 December 2021

Ti Parat Aaliye is a 2021 Indian Marathi-language horror drama series which airs on Zee Marathi. It is directed by Ankush Marode. The serial was premiered on 16 August 2021, replacing Devmanus. Vijay Kadam has made a comeback with this serial.

== Plot summary ==
The story is about nine friends who go to a resort for celebration as their exams just got over. While playing besides the pool they push one of the friends, who has water phobia, into the pool. As she is unable to swim, she dies inside the pool. 10 years later, they arrange a reunion and go back to the same resort where they encounter all sorts of paranormal activities.

== Cast ==
- Vijay Kadam as Baburao Tandel
- Kunjika Kalvint as Sayali
- Shreyas Raje as Satej
- Vaishnavi Karmarkar as Anuja
- Tejas Mahajan as Mandy
- Tanvi Kulkarni as Rohini
- Anup Belwalkar as Abhay
- Sameer Khandekar as Hanumanta
- Nachiket Devasthali as Vikrant
- Anushka Junnarkar as Nilambari
- Prathamesh Shivalkar as Tikaram Rajaram Chavan
- Varsha Padwal as Sayali's mother
- Sarang Doshi as Rohini's husband
- Devendra Sardar as Inspector Lokhande
- Sayali Gite as Mandy's sister
