= Hou De Jarasa Ushir =

- Movie poster
- Directed by: Wasim Maner
- Written by: Wasim Maner
- Screenplay by: Wasim Maner, Rahul Ovhal
- Produced by: Tahir Maner
- Starring: Sadashiv Amrapurkar; Aishwarya Narkar; Sharvari Jamenis; Chinmay Mandlekar; Raj Ranaware
- Cinematography: Wasim Maner, Meethil Momaya
- Edited by: Prashant Pandav
- Music by: Nakul Jogdeo
- Production company: Biroba Films
- Distributed by: Abhijit Gholap
- Release dates: 23 November 2012 (United States); 18 January 2013 (India)
- Country: India
- Language: Marathi

Hou De Jarasa Ushir (Marathi: होऊ दे जरासा उशीर, Let There Be A Little Delay) is an Indian Marathi film directed by Wasim Maner, produced by Tahir Maner under Biroba Films and distributed by Abhijit Gholap of Devisha Films]. Hou De Jarasa Ushir is the first Marathi film to be selected among top 282 films for a nomination in Best Film Category for Oscars. The film's screenplay has already been preserved by Academy of Motion Picture Arts and Sciences library for research purposes.

== Cast ==
- Sadashiv Amrapurkar as Fakir Baba
- Aishwarya Narkar as Rukmini Pawar
- Sharvari Jamenis as Sunaina Pandit
- Chinmay Mandlekar as Sarjerao Patil
- Aditi Sarangdhar as Monali Mohite
- Jayawant Wadkar as Marutrao Mohite
- Raj Ranaware as Malhar Gaikwad
- Abhyangh Kuvalekar as Shantanu Jahagirdar
- Anil Nagarkar as Shabbir Tamboli
- Priya Shinde as Swapna
- Vishwas Sakat as Bhavadya
- Akshay Waghmare as Mohanya
- Rajesh More as Dattu Pawar
- Manoj Narule as Sunil Pawar
- Sanyogita Bhave as Sneha Gosavi
- Mahesh Ghag as Shankar

== Plot ==
Hou De Jarasa Ushir (Let There Be A Little Delay) is the story of three people working at a software company. Every morning, they travel to work together in the same cab. HDJU paints a single day in their life where the journey from their homes to the office makes them to look at the world quite differently.

== Release ==
Hou De Jarasa Ushir is released on 18 January 2013 all over Maharashtra. It was released in California United States on 23 November 2012.

== Music ==
Music of Hou De Jarasa Ushir is composed by Nakul Shirish Jogdeo and lyrics are written by Rahul Gautam Ovhal.

Track listing
No.	Title	Singer(s)	Length
1.	"Piraticha-Tujhya Majhya Piraticha" (A bubbly romantic farmer-song)	Chandan Kamble, Sonia Mundhe	02:48
2.	"Kashas Ghai" (A light romantic song)	Hamsika Iyer, Gandhar Sangoram	03:33
3.	"Bolawanarya Akashache" (A soft rock song)	Mandar Phatak	04:03
4.	"Dhampak Dhampak" (A rap song)	Sadashiv Amarapurkar	03:29
5.	"Vithoo Aai" (A bhajan)	Rucha Bondre	04:25
6.	"Lagnala Jayacha" (A comedy ‘band-baja’ song)	Raj Ranaware, Vishas Sakat	03:00
7.	"Hou De Jarasa Ushir" (A Sufi song)	Anand Shinde	07:14
