= Shweta Shinde =

Indian actress and producer

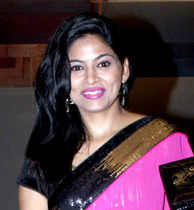
- at the premiere of Deool Band
- Born: Satara, Maharashtra, India
- Occupations: Actress; Model; Producer
- Years active: 1998–present
- Spouse: Sandeep Bhansali (m. 2007)
- Website: shwetashindeofficial.com

Shweta Shinde is an Indian actress and producer, known for Lagira Zala Ji's producer and Doctor Don. She launched Vajra Production with Film director Sanjay Khambe in 2016.

== Personal life ==
Shweta Shinde married to Sandeep Bhansali in 2007. She has also one daughter.

== Career ==
She started her career with modelling and later she moved to act in films and daily soaps.

== Filmography ==
=== Television ===
Year	Show	Role
1998	CID	Nalini
2002-2003	Kumkum – Ek Pyara Sa Bandhan	Supporting role
2003	Gharana	Supporting role
2004	Avantika	Supporting role
2004	Titliyaan	Teenager
2004-2005	Tumhari Disha	Supporting role
2004-2007	Char Divas Sasuche	Nisha Desai
2006	Vadalvaat	Monika Sardesai
2007	Parrivaar	Meghna
2007-2009	Kata Rute Kunala	Supporting role
2006-2010	Avaghachi Sansar	Supporting role
2009	Maharashtracha Nach Baliye	Contestant
2014-2016	Lakshya	Inspector Renuka Rathod
2012-2013	Unch Majha Zoka	Supporting role
2020-2021	Doctor Don	Dr. Monika Shrikhande
2022	Nave Lakshya	Inspector Renuka Rathod

=== Films ===
Films
Year	Movie	Role
2001	Gadar: Ek Prem Katha	Sakina's friend
2005	Aabhas	Neha Chitnis
2005	Aai No.1	Police
2005	Navra Hawa All Rounder	Small role
2006	Ishhya	Rasika Rane
2008	Sakkha Bhau Pakka Vairi	Pushpa
2008	Mohini	Priya
2008	Baap Re Baap Dokyala Taap	Nimbalkar's wife
2009	Adhantari	Dhanashri
2009	Hai Kai Nai Kai	Maya
2009	Jawai Bapu Zindabad	
2009	Yelkot Yelkot Jai Malhar	Vikram's wife
2010	Ladi Godi	
2013	Dhating Dhingana	Lady assistant inspector
2015	Deool Band	RAW Agent
2016	Toh Aani Me	Manjiri Kamat
