= List of programmes broadcast by Zee Marathi =

Zee Marathi is an Indian Marathi language general entertainment channel which is owned by Zee Entertainment Enterprises. This is the list of programmes broadcast by the channel.

== Current broadcast ==
=== Fiction series ===
Premiere date	Series	Adaptation of	Ref.
23 September 2024	Savalyachi Janu Savali	Bengali TV series Krishnakoli	
11 August 2025	Veen Doghantali Hi Tutena	Hindi TV series Bade Achhe Lagte Hain	
23 December 2024	Lakshmi Niwas	Kannada TV series Lakshmi Nivasa	
30 June 2025	Kamali	Telugu TV series Mutyala Muggu	
11 August 2025	Tarini	Bengali TV series Jagaddhatri	
2 June 2025	Devmanus – Madhala Adhyay	—N/a	
17 February 2025	Tula Japnar Aahe	Kannada TV series Naa Ninna Bidalaare	
19 January 2026	Shubh Shravani	Telugu TV series Ammayi Garu	
15 June 2026	Krushnaichya Leki	Telugu TV series Radhamma Kuthuru	
16 March 2026	Sanai Chaughade	Telugu TV series Varudhini Parinayam	
13 April 2026	Deep Jyoti	Tamil TV series Veera	

=== Non-fiction shows ===
Premiere date	Show	Ref.
8 June 2020	Vedh Bhavishyacha	
9 August 2025	Aamhi Saare Khavayye Jodicha Mamla	
22 August 2026	Sa Re Ga Ma Pa Marathi Season 12	
31 August 2026	Home Minister	

== Former broadcast ==
Premiere date	Series	Last aired	Adaptation of
16 August 1999	Aabhalmaya	4 July 2003	
2 November 2001	Shriyut Gangadhar Tipre	24 December 2004	
3 June 2002	Avantika	25 March 2005	
7 July 2003	Vadalvaat	9 February 2007	
18 October 2004	Adhuri Ek Kahani	16 February 2008	
14 November 2005	Ya Sukhano Ya	14 November 2008	
22 May 2006	Avaghachi Sansar	24 April 2010	
20 November 2006	Vahinisaheb	9 May 2009	
12 February 2007	Asambhav	29 August 2009	
17 November 2008	Kulvadhu	12 June 2010	
27 July 2009	Kunku	4 February 2012	
14 June 2010	Maziya Priyala Preet Kalena	30 July 2011	
12 July 2010	Lajja	28 May 2011	
17 January 2011	Pinjara	25 August 2012	
27 June 2011	Guntata Hriday He	13 January 2012	
10 October 2011	Arundhati	14 April 2012	
28 November 2011	Dilya Ghari Tu Sukhi Raha	22 December 2012	
16 January 2012	Eka Lagnachi Dusri Goshta	25 August 2012	
5 March 2012	Unch Majha Zoka	14 July 2013	
16 April 2012	Tu Tithe Me	17 May 2014	
27 August 2012	Mala Sasu Havi	23 November 2013	
24 December 2012	Radha Hi Bawari	1 March 2014	
27 February 2013	Shejari Shejari Pakke Shejari	24 May 2014	
13 May 2013	Tuza Maza Jamena	5 October 2013	
15 July 2013	Honar Soon Mi Hya Gharchi	24 January 2016	
14 October 2013	Eka Lagnachi Tisri Goshta	16 August 2014	
25 November 2013	Julun Yeti Reshimgathi	26 September 2015	
5 February 2014	Asmita	13 January 2017	
3 March 2014	Jawai Vikat Ghene Aahe	23 January 2015	
18 May 2014	Jai Malhar	30 April 2017	
18 August 2014	Ka Re Durava	27 March 2016	
24 January 2015	Ase He Kanyadan	18 July 2015	
9 March 2015	Dil Dosti Duniyadari	20 February 2016	
20 July 2015	Nanda Saukhya Bhare	1 October 2016	
28 September 2015	Majhe Pati Saubhagyawati	16 July 2016	
25 January 2016	Pasant Aahe Mulgi	20 August 2016	
22 February 2016	Ratris Khel Chale	22 October 2016	
28 March 2016	Kahe Diya Pardes	23 September 2017	
18 July 2016	Khulta Kali Khulena	16 September 2017	
22 August 2016	Majhya Navaryachi Bayko	7 March 2021	
3 October 2016	Tujhyat Jeev Rangala	2 January 2021	
24 October 2016	100 Days	17 February 2017	
18 January 2017	Chukbhul Dyavi Ghyavi	29 July 2017	
18 January 2017	Naktichya Lagnala Yaycha Ha	4 November 2017	
18 February 2017	Dil Dosti Dobara	12 August 2017	
1 May 2017	Lagira Zala Ji	22 June 2019	
24 July 2017	Jadubai Jorat	31 March 2018	
2 August 2017	Gaav Gata Gajali	9 November 2018	
14 August 2017	Jaago Mohan Pyare	10 November 2018	
18 September 2017	Tuza Maza Breakup	11 August 2018	
24 September 2017	Swarajyarakshak Sambhaji	29 February 2020	
8 November 2017	Hum To Tere Aashiq Hai	12 September 2018	Hindi TV series Bhabiji Ghar Par Hain!
19 March 2018	Grahan	14 July 2018	
16 July 2018	Naammatra	28 July 2018	
30 July 2018	Baaji	12 January 2019	
13 August 2018	Tula Pahate Re	20 July 2019	
14 January 2019	Ratris Khel Chale 2	29 August 2020	
24 June 2019	Mrs. Mukhyamantri	12 September 2020	
22 July 2019	Aggabai Sasubai	13 March 2021	
7 August 2019	Bhago Mohan Pyare	11 January 2020	
7 August 2019	Alti Palti Sumdit Kalti	11 January 2020	
21 October 2019	Lagnachi Wife Weddingchi Bayku	3 April 2020	
2 March 2020	Majha Hoshil Na	28 August 2021	
8 June 2020	Gharat Basle Saare	10 July 2020	
15 June 2020	Total Hublak	11 July 2020	
18 June 2020	Ek Gaav Bhutacha	1 July 2020	
31 August 2020	Devmanus	15 August 2021	
14 September 2020	Ladachi Mi Lek Ga!	30 April 2021	
2 November 2020	Karbhari Laybhari	21 August 2021	
31 December 2020	Kaay Ghadla Tya Ratri?	23 April 2021	
4 January 2021	Yeu Kashi Tashi Me Nandayla	19 March 2022	
1 March 2021	Pahile Na Mi Tula	28 August 2021	
8 March 2021	Ghetla Vasa Taku Nako	9 April 2022	
15 March 2021	Aggabai Sunbai	21 August 2021	
22 March 2021	Ratris Khel Chale 3	9 April 2022	
16 August 2021	Ti Parat Aaliye	18 December 2021	
23 August 2021	Man Jhala Bajind	11 June 2022	
23 August 2021	Majhi Tujhi Reshimgath	22 January 2023	
30 August 2021	Man Udu Udu Jhala	13 August 2022	
30 August 2021	Tujhya Majhya Sansarala Aani Kay Hava!	6 August 2022	
19 December 2021	Devmanus 2	10 September 2022	
20 March 2022	Tu Tevha Tashi	26 March 2023	
12 June 2022	Satyawan Savitri	20 August 2022	
8 August 2022	Nava Gadi Nava Rajya	23 December 2023	
15 August 2022	Tu Chal Pudha	13 January 2024	
22 August 2022	Appi Aamchi Collector	15 March 2025	
12 September 2022	Satvya Mulichi Satavi Mulgi	21 December 2024	Bengali TV series Trinayani
19 September 2022	Daar Ughad Baye	7 October 2023	Bengali TV series Jamuna Dhaki
7 November 2022	Hrudayi Preet Jagate	27 May 2023	
21 December 2022	Aga Aga Sunbai Kay Mhanta Sasubai?	27 May 2023	
21 December 2022	Lokmanya	5 August 2023	
23 January 2023	36 Guni Jodi	24 December 2023	Telugu TV series Varudhini Parinayam
13 February 2023	Lavangi Mirchi	5 August 2023	Telugu TV series Radhamma Kuthuru
13 February 2023	Yashoda - Goshta Shyamchya Aaichi	19 August 2023	
13 March 2023	Tula Shikvin Changlach Dhada	25 May 2025	
27 March 2023	Chandravilas	1 July 2023	
21 August 2023	Saara Kahi Tichyasathi	14 September 2024	Hindi TV series Sapne Suhane Ladakpan Ke
12 February 2024	Shiva	8 August 2025	Odia TV series Sindura Bindu
12 February 2024	Paaru	10 February 2026	Telugu TV series Muddha Mandaram
18 March 2024	Punha Kartavya Aahe	15 March 2025	Hindi TV series Punar Vivaah – Zindagi Milegi Dobara
18 March 2024	Navri Mile Hitlerla	25 May 2025	Hindi TV series Guddan Tumse Na Ho Payega
8 July 2024	Lakhat Ek Aamcha Dada	4 October 2025	Tamil TV series Anna

== Reality shows ==
1. Sa Re Ga Ma Pa Marathi (11 seasons)
2. Fu Bai Fu (9 seasons)
3. Eka Peksha Ek (7 seasons)
4. Sa Re Ga Ma Pa Marathi Li'l Champs (4 seasons)
5. Khupte Tithe Gupte (3 seasons)
6. Dance Maharashtra Dance (3 seasons)
7. Hapta Band (2 seasons)
8. Maharashtracha Superstar (2 seasons)
9. Marathi Paaul Padte Pudhe (2 seasons)
10. Kitchen Kallakar (2 seasons)
11. Band Baja Varat (2 seasons)
12. Zing Zing Zingat
13. Kanala Khada
14. Ali Mili Gupchili
15. Dancing Queen
16. He Tar Kahich Nay
17. Maha Minister
18. Bus Bai Bas
19. Jau Bai Gavat
20. Drama Juniors
21. Chal Bhava Citit
22. Chala Hawa Yeu Dya Comedycha Gangwar

=== Non-fiction shows ===
1. Home Minister
2. Maharashtrachi Kitchen Queen
3. Good Morning Maharashtra (TV series)
