= Zee Marathi Utsav Natyancha Awards =

Indian Marathi-language media awards ceremony

Zee Marathi Utsav Natyancha Award
- Awarded for: Excellence in soap opera and Television Arts
- Sponsored by: Waman Hari Pethe Jewellers
- Location: Mumbai
- Country: India
- Presented by: Zee Marathi
- Formerly called: Aapla Alpha Award
- First award: 2004
- Final award: 2026

Television/radio coverage
- Network: ZEE5, Zee Entertainment Enterprises

Zee Marathi Utsav Natyancha Award (transl. Zee Marathi Festival of Relations Award) is an awards ceremony held yearly, sponsored by Waman Hari Pethe Jewellers and presented by Zee Marathi. This event is held in the month of October / November for each year and awards are given to the best entertainers for variety programs aired on its channel. The first awards ceremony held in 2004 which was formerly known as Aapla Alpha Award.

== Ceremony ==
Year	Date	Host	Notes	Ref.
2004	14 August 2004	Bharat Dabholkar	Received 7.5 TVRs	
2005	13 August 2005	Sachin Pilgaonkar		
2006	12 August 2006	Sanjay Mone, Sumeet Raghavan	Received 1.9 TVTs	
2007	28 October 2007	Pushkar Shrotri, Prasad Oak		
2008	31 August 2008	Atul Parchure, Sumeet Raghavan		
2009	30 August 2009	Nirmiti Sawant, Pushkar Shrotri		
2010	31 October 2010	Sunil Barve		
2011	9 October 2011	Pushkar Shrotri, Jitendra Joshi		
2012	28 October 2012	Atul Parchure, Sumeet Raghavan		
2013	27 October 2013	Hrishikesh Joshi		
2014	26 October 2014	Sumeet Raghavan, Priyadarshan Jadhav		
2015	1 November 2015	Pushkaraj Chirputkar, Amey Wagh	Received 3.7 TVTs gaining first position	
2016	23 October 2016	Vaibhav Mangle	Received 3.5 TVTs gaining first position	
2017	15 October 2017	Sanjay Mone, Atul Parchure	Received 5.5 TVTs gaining third position	
2018	28 October 2018	Sanjay Mone, Abhijeet Khandkekar	Received 8.0 TVTs gaining first position	
2019	20 October 2019	Zee Marathi family members	Received 5.8 TVRs	
2020-21	28 March, 4 April 2021	Shashank Ketkar, Kiran Gaikwad	Received 3.4 TVRs	
2021	30 October 2021	Anvita Phaltankar, Shalva Kinjawadekar		
2022	15 October 2022	Sumeet Raghavan, Amey Wagh		
2023	4 November 2023	Hrishikesh Shelar, Shivani Rangole		
2024	26-27 October 2024	Sankarshan Karhade, Mrunmayee Deshpande	Received 3.9 TVRs	
2025	11-12 October 2025	Abhijeet Khandkekar, Mrunmayee Deshpande	Received 2.3 TVRs	
Ugach	28 December 2025	Nilesh Sable, Bhalchandra Kadam		
2026	31 October-1 November 2026	Pushkaraj Chirputkar, Amey Wagh		

== 2004 ==
Category	Winner	Series
Best Series		Vadalvaat
Best Title Song		Ghadlay Bighadlay
Best Family	Tipre Family	Shriyut Gangadhar Tipre
Best Actor	Gangadhar Tipre (Aaba)	Shriyut Gangadhar Tipre
Best Actress	Avantika Dixit	Avantika
Best Couple	Padmini-Shrikant	Bandhan
Best Negative Actor	Devram Khandagale	Vadalvaat
Best Negative Actress	Vishakha Chaudhari	Vadalvaat
Best Character Male	Saibaba	Saibaba
Best Character Female	Rama Chaudhari	Vadalvaat
Best Supporting Character	Salil Dixit	Avantika
Best Comedy Character	Mohan Ajgaonkar	Saheb Bibi Ani Me
Best Child Character	Jui Nerurkar	Avantika
Best Anchor Male	Jitendra Joshi	Campus: A Fair War
Best Anchor Female	Sampada Joglekar	Namaskar Alpha
Best Father	Aaba Chaudhari	Vadalvaat
Best Mother	Shyamala Tipre	Shriyut Gangadhar Tipre
Best Comedy Series		Hasa Chakat Fu
Best Non-fiction Show		Goodmorning Maharashtra
Best Discursive Show		Aamne Samne
Best Event		Nakshatranche Dene

== 2005 ==
Category	Winner	Series
Best Series		Vadalvaat
Best Title Song		Vadalvaat
Best Family	Chaudhari Family	Vadalvaat
Best Actor	Aaba Chaudhari	Vadalvaat
Best Actress	Rama Chaudhari	Vadalvaat
Best Couple	Aaba-Sulakshana	Vadalvaat
Best Negative Actor	Devram Khandagale	Vadalvaat
Best Negative Actress	Kalyani Patwardhan	Adhuri Ek Kahani
Best Character Male	Jaysingh Rajput	Vadalvaat
Best Character Female	Rama Chaudhari	Vadalvaat
Best Supporting Actor	Samar Ajinkya	Vadalvaat
Best Supporting Actress	Shravani Chaudhari	Vadalvaat
Best Comedy Character	Mohan Ajgaonkar	Saheb Bibi Ani Me
Best Child Character	Raj	Misha
Best Child Character	Chirag	Ankur
Best Anchor Male	Aadesh Bandekar	Home Minister
Best Anchor Female	Rani Gunaji & Rujuta Deshmukh	Manasi Tumchya Ghari
Best Father	Aaba Chaudhari	Vadalvaat
Best Mother	Sulakshana Chaudhari	Vadalvaat
Best Newcomer	Sagar Sardesai	Oon Paaus
Best Non-fiction Show		Home Minister
Best Discursive Show		Aamne Samne
Best Event		Nakshatranche Dene

== 2006 ==
Category	Winner	Series
Best Series		Ya Sukhano Ya
Best Title Song		Oon Paaus
Best Family	Chaudhari Family	Vadalvaat
Best Actor	Sagar Sardesai	Oon Paaus
Best Actress	Mukta Sardesai	Oon Paaus
Best Couple	Sagar-Mukta	Oon Paaus
Best Siblings	Asawari-Antara	Avaghachi Sansar
Best Negative Actor	Devram Khandagale	Vadalvaat
Best Negative Actress	Kalyani Patwardhan	Adhuri Ek Kahani
Best Character Male	Abhay Adhikari	Ya Sukhano Ya
Best Character Female	Rama Chaudhari	Vadalvaat
Best Supporting Actor	Mayuresh Adhikari	Ya Sukhano Ya
Best Supporting Actress	Janhavi Chaudhari	Vadalvaat
Best Comedy Character	Chakor	Asa Mi Tasa Mi
Best Lyricist	Saumitra	Oon Paaus
Best Anchor Male	Aadesh Bandekar	Home Minister
Best Anchor Female	Rani Gunaji	Manasi Tumchya Ghari
Best Father	Aaba Chaudhari	Vadalvaat
Best Mother	Sulakshana Chaudhari	Vadalvaat
Best Non-fiction Show		Home Minister
Best Discursive Show		Zee News Marathi
Best Event		Nakshatranche Dene

== 2007 ==
Category	Winner	Series
Best Series		Asambhav
Best Title Song		Asambhav
Best Family	Shastri Family	Asambhav
Best Actor	Harshvardhan Bhosale	Avaghachi Sansar
Best Actress	Sarita Adhikari	Ya Sukhano Ya
Best Couple	Abhay-Sarita	Ya Sukhano Ya
Best Siblings	Adinath-Priya	Asambhav
Best Negative Actor	Sopan Shastri	Asambhav
Best Negative Actress	Sulekha Raut	Asambhav
Best Character Male	Dinanath Shastri	Asambhav
Best Character Female	Asawari Bhosale	Avaghachi Sansar
Best Supporting Actor	Mayuresh Adhikari	Ya Sukhano Ya
Best Supporting Actress	Neha Kirloskar	Vahinisaheb
Best Child Character	Prathamesh Shastri	Asambhav
Best Lyricist	Mangesh Kulkarni	Ya Sukhano Ya
Best Anchor Male	Aadesh Bandekar	Home Minister
Best Anchor Female	Pallavi Joshi	Sa Re Ga Ma Pa Marathi
Best Judge	Devaki Pandit	Sa Re Ga Ma Pa Marathi
Best Father	Raghunath Mohite	Avaghachi Sansar
Best Mother	Sarita Adhikari	Ya Sukhano Ya
Best Non-fiction Show		Sa Re Ga Ma Pa Marathi
Best Event		Nakshatranche Dene

== 2008 ==
Category	Winner	Series
Best Series		Asambhav
Best Title Song		Kalat Nakalat
Best Family	Adhikari Family	Ya Sukhano Ya
Best Actor	Harshvardhan Bhosale	Avaghachi Sansar
Best Actress	Bhairavi Kirloskar	Vahinisaheb
Best Couple	Gaurav-Madhura	Kalat Nakalat
Best Siblings	Adinath-Priya	Asambhav
Best Negative Actor	Sopan Shastri	Asambhav
Best Negative Actress	Sulekha Raut	Asambhav
Best Character Male	Dinanath Shastri	Asambhav
Best Character Female	Asawari Bhosale	Avaghachi Sansar
Best Supporting Actor	Sachin Mhatre	Avaghachi Sansar
Best Supporting Actress	Priya Shastri	Asambhav
Best Lyricist	Ashwini Shende	Kalat Nakalat
Best Anchor Male	Aadesh Bandekar	Home Minister
Best Anchor Female	Pallavi Joshi	Sa Re Ga Ma Pa Marathi
Best Judge	Sachin Pilgaonkar	Eka Peksha Ek
Best Father	Abhay Adhikari	Ya Sukhano Ya
Best Mother	Sarita Adhikari	Ya Sukhano Ya
Best Non-fiction Show		Sa Re Ga Ma Pa Marathi
Best Event		Eka Peksha Ek Grand Finale

== 2009 ==
Category	Winner	Series
Best Series		Kulvadhu
Best Title Song		Kulvadhu
Best Family	Shastri Family	Asambhav
Best Actor	Vikramaditya Rajeshirke	Kulvadhu
Best Actress	Devyani Deshmukh	Kulvadhu
Best Couple	Devyani-Vikramaditya	Kulvadhu
Best Siblings	Devyani-Sakshi	Kulvadhu
Best Negative Actor	Ranveer Rajeshirke	Kulvadhu
Best Negative Actress	Sulekha Raut	Asambhav
Best Character Male	Damodar Deshmukh	Kulvadhu
Best Character Female	Asawari Bhosale	Avaghachi Sansar
Best Supporting Actor	Inspector Vazalvar	Asambhav
Best Supporting Actress	Godavari	Kulvadhu
Best Lyricist	Ashwini Shende	Kulvadhu
Best Anchor Male	Aadesh Bandekar	Home Minister
Best Anchor Female	Pallavi Joshi	Sa Re Ga Ma Pa Marathi Li'l Champs
Best Judge	Avadhoot Gupte	Sa Re Ga Ma Pa Marathi Li'l Champs
Best Father	Dinanath Shastri	Asambhav
Best Mother	Vasudha Shastri	Asambhav
Best Comedy Character	Kamana Kamtekar	Constable Kamana Kamtekar
Best Comedy Show		Malwani Days
Best Non-fiction Show		Sa Re Ga Ma Pa Marathi Li'l Champs
Best Event		Sa Re Ga Ma Pa Marathi Li'l Champs Grand Finale
Special Striking Face	Devyani Deshmukh	Kulvadhu

== 2010 ==
Category	Winner	Series
Best Series		Kunku
Best Title Song		Maziya Priyala Preet Kalena
Best Family	Pendse Family	Maziya Priyala Preet Kalena
Best Actor	Abhijeet Pendse	Maziya Priyala Preet Kalena
Best Actress	Janaki Killedar	Kunku
Best Couple	Abhijeet-Shamika	Maziya Priyala Preet Kalena
Best Siblings	Janaki-Ganesh	Kunku
Best Negative Actor	Parshuram Killedar	Kunku
Best Negative Actress	Kamini Mohite	Bhagyalaxmi
Best Character Male	Bappaji	Bhagyalaxmi
Best Character Female	Krishna Killedar	Kunku
Best Supporting Actor	Padmakar Waknis	Kunku
Best Supporting Actress	Radhika	Kunku
Best Newcomer Male	Abhijeet Pendse	Maziya Priyala Preet Kalena
Best Newcomer Female	Shamika Pendse	Maziya Priyala Preet Kalena
Best Anchor Male	Nilesh Sable	Fu Bai Fu
Best Anchor Female	Renuka Shahane	Yala Jeevan Aise Naav
Best Judge	Avadhoot Gupte	Sa Re Ga Ma Pa Marathi
Best Father	Narsingh Killedar	Kunku
Best Mother	Vibhavari Pendse	Maziya Priyala Preet Kalena
Best Comedy Character	Malak	Shubham Karoti
Best Lyricist	Ashwini Shende	Maziya Priyala Preet Kalena
Best Reality Show		Fu Bai Fu
Best Non-fiction Show		Sade Made Teen
Best Event		Zee Marathi Awards 2009
Special Striking Face	Janaki Killedar	Kunku

== 2011 ==
Category	Winner	Series
Best Series		Pinjara
Best Title Song		Marathi Paaul Padte Pudhe
Best Family	Killedar Family	Kunku
Best Actor	Virendra Deshmukh	Pinjara
Best Actress	Nayana Banarase	Guntata Hriday He
Best Couple	Veer-Anandi	Pinjara
Best Siblings	Janaki-Ganesh	Kunku
Best Negative Actor	Tatya Deshmukh	Pinjara
Best Negative Actress	Akka Deshmukh	Pinjara
Best Character Male	Mayank Banarase	Guntata Hriday He
Best Character Female	Janaki Killedar	Kunku
Best Supporting Actor	Vishwas Banarase	Guntata Hriday He
Best Supporting Actress	Shalini Deshmukh	Pinjara
Best Anchor Male	Aadesh Bandekar	Home Minister
Best Anchor Female	Priya Bapat	Sa Re Ga Ma Pa Marathi
Best Judge	Ajay-Atul	Sa Re Ga Ma Pa Marathi
Best Father	Machhindra Deshmukh	Pinjara
Best Mother	Nayana Banarase	Guntata Hriday He
Best Lyricist	Shrirang Godbole	Marathi Paaul Padte Pudhe
Best Reality Show		Marathi Paaul Padte Pudhe
Best Non-fiction Show		Home Minister
Special Striking Face	Anjali Salgaonkar	Ekach Hya Janmi Janu

== 2012 ==
Category	Winner	Series
Best Series		Unch Majha Zoka
Best Title Song		Unch Majha Zoka
Best Family	Ranade Family	Unch Majha Zoka
Best Actor	Satyajeet Mudholkar	Tu Tithe Me
Best Actress	Manjiri Mudholkar	Tu Tithe Me
Best Couple	Rama-Mahadev	Unch Majha Zoka
Best Negative Character	Priya Mohite	Tu Tithe Me
Best Character Male	Mahadev Ranade	Unch Majha Zoka
Best Character Female	Ramabai Ranade	Unch Majha Zoka
Best Supporting Actor	Pandu	Unch Majha Zoka
Best Supporting Actress	Subhadra Ranade	Unch Majha Zoka
Best Judge Male	Sachin Pilgaonkar	Eka Peksha Ek
Best Judge Female	Urmila Matondkar	Marathi Paaul Padte Pudhe
Best Anchor	Aadesh Bandekar	Home Minister
Best Anchor	Makarand Anaspure	Hapta Band
Best Father	Govind Ranade	Unch Majha Zoka
Best Mother	Maai Ranade	Unch Majha Zoka
Best Mother-in-law	Gayatri Ratnaparkhi	Mala Sasu Havi
Best Daughter-in-law	Manjiri Mudholkar	Tu Tithe Me
Best Reality Show		Fu Bai Fu
Best Non-fiction Show		Home Minister
Special Striking Face	Ramabai Ranade	Unch Majha Zoka

== 2013 ==
Category	Winner	Series
Best Series		Honar Soon Mi Hya Gharchi
Best Title Song		Radha Hi Bawari
Best Family	Gokhale Family	Honar Soon Mi Hya Gharchi
Best Actor	Shrirang Gokhale	Honar Soon Mi Hya Gharchi
Best Actress	Janhavi Gokhale	Honar Soon Mi Hya Gharchi
Best Couple	Shree-Janhavi	Honar Soon Mi Hya Gharchi
Best Negative Actor	Dada Holkar	Tu Tithe Me
Best Negative Actress	Shashikala Sahastrabuddhe	Honar Soon Mi Hya Gharchi
Best Character Male	Satyajeet Mudholkar	Tu Tithe Me
Best Character Female	Seema Dharmadhikari	Radha Hi Bawari
Best Supporting Actor	Sadanand Borkar	Honar Soon Mi Hya Gharchi
Best Supporting Actress	Abhilasha Ratnaparkhi	Mala Sasu Havi
Best Comedy Actor	Ballal & Birju Pathak	Shejari Shejari Pakke Shejari
Best Comedy Actress	Sharayu Gokhale	Honar Soon Mi Hya Gharchi
Best Anchor	Aadesh Bandekar	Home Minister
Best Anchor	Vijay Kelkar	Vedh Bhavishyacha
Best Judge	Swapnil Joshi	Fu Bai Fu
Best Father	Sadashiv Sahastrabuddhe	Honar Soon Mi Hya Gharchi
Best Mother	Narmada Gokhale	Honar Soon Mi Hya Gharchi
Best Father-in-law	Madhukar Dharmadhikari	Radha Hi Bawari
Best Mother-in-law	Janhavi's six Mother-in-laws	Honar Soon Mi Hya Gharchi
Best Daughter-in-law	Manjiri Mudholkar	Tu Tithe Me
Best Non-fiction Show		Fu Bai Fu
Special Striking Face	Radha Dharmadhikari	Radha Hi Bawari

== 2014 ==
Category	Winner	Series
Best Series		Honar Soon Mi Hya Gharchi
Best Title Song		Jai Malhar
Best Family	Desai Family	Julun Yeti Reshimgathi
Best Actor	Aditya Desai	Julun Yeti Reshimgathi
Best Actress	Janhavi Gokhale	Honar Soon Mi Hya Gharchi
Best Couple	Shree-Janhavi	Honar Soon Mi Hya Gharchi
Best Siblings	Aditya-Amit-Archana	Julun Yeti Reshimgathi
Best Negative Character	Shashikala Sahastrabuddhe	Honar Soon Mi Hya Gharchi
Best Character Male	Hegdi Pradhan	Jai Malhar
Best Character Female	Asmita Agnihotri	Asmita
Best Supporting Actor	Mahalakshmi	Jai Malhar
Best Supporting Actress	Laxmikant Gokhale	Honar Soon Mi Hya Gharchi
Best Comedy Character	Suresh Kudalkar	Julun Yeti Reshimgathi
Best Anchor	Nilesh Sable	Chala Hawa Yeu Dya
Best Judge	Avadhoot Gupte	Sa Re Ga Ma Pa Marathi
Best Father	Nana Desai	Julun Yeti Reshimgathi
Best Mother	Maai Desai	Julun Yeti Reshimgathi
Best Father-in-law	Nana Desai	Julun Yeti Reshimgathi
Best Mother-in-law	Maai Desai	Julun Yeti Reshimgathi
Best Daughter-in-law	Janhavi Gokhale	Honar Soon Mi Hya Gharchi
Best Non-fiction Show		Home Minister
Special Striking Face	Aditi Khanolkar	Ka Re Durava

== 2015 ==
Category	Winner	Series
Best Series		Ka Re Durava
Best Title Song		Dil Dosti Duniyadari
Best Family	Majghar Family	Dil Dosti Duniyadari
Best Actor	Khandoba	Jai Malhar
Best Actress	Mhalsa	Jai Malhar
Best Actress	Banai	Jai Malhar
Best Couple	Jay-Aditi	Ka Re Durava
Best Siblings	Reshma-Ashutosh	Dil Dosti Duniyadari
Best Negative Character	Shashikala Sahastrabuddhe	Honar Soon Mi Hya Gharchi
Best Character Male	Dinanath Ketkar	Ka Re Durava
Best Character Female	Bhagirathi Gokhale	Honar Soon Mi Hya Gharchi
Best Supporting Actor	Arvind Kadam	Ka Re Durava
Best Supporting Actress	Aau Deo	Ka Re Durava
Best Comedy Character	Bhalchandra Kadam	Chala Hawa Yeu Dya
Best Anchor	Nilesh Sable	Chala Hawa Yeu Dya
Best Father	Dinanath Ketkar	Ka Re Durava
Best Mother	Mrs. Ketkar	Ka Re Durava
Best Father-in-law	Parshuram Khanolkar	Ka Re Durava
Best Mother-in-law	Janhavi's six Mother-in-laws	Honar Soon Mi Hya Gharchi
Best Daughter-in-law	Aditi Khanolkar	Ka Re Durava
Best Non-fiction Show		Chala Hawa Yeu Dya
Special Striking Face	Swanandi Deshpande	Nanda Saukhya Bhare

== 2016 ==
Category	Winner	Series
Best Series		Kahe Diya Pardes
Best Title Song		Khulta Kali Khulena
Best Family	Sawant Family	Kahe Diya Pardes
Best Actor	Shivkumar Shukla	Kahe Diya Pardes
Best Actress	Gauri Shukla	Kahe Diya Pardes
Best Couple	Shiv-Gauri	Kahe Diya Pardes
Best Siblings	Nachiket-Gauri	Kahe Diya Pardes
Best Negative Character	Shanaya Sabnis	Majhya Navaryachi Bayko
Best Character Male	Pandu	Ratris Khel Chale
Best Character Female	Parvati Dalvi	Khulta Kali Khulena
Best Supporting Actor	Narad	Jai Malhar
Best Supporting Actress	Mahalakshmi	Jai Malhar
Best Comedy Character	Bhalchandra Kadam	Chala Hawa Yeu Dya
Best Anchor	Nilesh Sable	Chala Hawa Yeu Dya
Best Father	Madhusudan Sawant	Kahe Diya Pardes
Best Mother	Radhika Subhedar	Majhya Navaryachi Bayko
Best Father-in-law	Madhusudan Sawant	Kahe Diya Pardes
Best Mother-in-law	Aaji	Kahe Diya Pardes
Best Daughter-in-law	Gauri Shukla	Kahe Diya Pardes
Best Non-fiction Show		Chala Hawa Yeu Dya
Special Striking Face	Gauri Shukla	Kahe Diya Pardes

== 2017 ==
Category	Winner	Series
Best Series		Lagira Zala Ji
Best Series		Tujhyat Jeev Rangala
Best Title Song		Lagira Zala Ji
Best Family	Gaikwad Family	Tujhyat Jeev Rangala
Best Actor	Ranvijay Gaikwad	Tujhyat Jeev Rangala
Best Actress	Sheetal Pawar	Lagira Zala Ji
Best Couple	Ajinkya-Sheetal	Lagira Zala Ji
Best Siblings	Rana-Suraj	Tujhyat Jeev Rangala
Best Negative Actor	Gurunath Subhedar	Majhya Navaryachi Bayko
Best Negative Actress	Shanaya Sabnis	Majhya Navaryachi Bayko
Best Character Male	Rahul Tate	Lagira Zala Ji
Best Character Female	Radhika Subhedar	Majhya Navaryachi Bayko
Best Supporting Actor	Vikram Raut	Lagira Zala Ji
Best Supporting Actress	Jayshri Bhoite	Lagira Zala Ji
Best Comedy Character	Bhalchandra Kadam	Chala Hawa Yeu Dya
Best Anchor	Nilesh Sable	Chala Hawa Yeu Dya
Best Father	Surendra Pawar	Lagira Zala Ji
Best Mother	Godakka	Tujhyat Jeev Rangala
Best Father-in-law	Pratap Gaikwad	Tujhyat Jeev Rangala
Best Mother-in-law	Sarita Subhedar	Majhya Navaryachi Bayko
Best Daughter-in-law	Anjali Gaikwad	Tujhyat Jeev Rangala
Best Grandmother	Jiji Bhoite	Lagira Zala Ji
Best Child Character	Dhruv Pawar	Lagira Zala Ji
Best Non-fiction Show		Chala Hawa Yeu Dya
Special Striking Face	Anjali Gaikwad	Tujhyat Jeev Rangala

== 2018 ==
Category	Winner	Series
Best Series		Tula Pahate Re
Best Title Song		Tula Pahate Re
Best Family	Nimkar Family	Tula Pahate Re
Best Actor	Vikrant Saranjame	Tula Pahate Re
Best Actress	Radhika Subhedar	Majhya Navaryachi Bayko
Best Couple	Rana-Anjali	Tujhyat Jeev Rangala
Best Siblings	Rana-Suraj	Tujhyat Jeev Rangala
Best Negative Actor	Harshvardhan Deshmukh	Lagira Zala Ji
Best Negative Actress	Nandita Gaikwad	Tujhyat Jeev Rangala
Best Character Male	Arun Nimkar	Tula Pahate Re
Best Character Female	Radhika Subhedar	Majhya Navaryachi Bayko
Best Supporting Actor	Barkat	Tujhyat Jeev Rangala
Best Supporting Actress	Revati Gupte	Majhya Navaryachi Bayko
Best Comedy Character	Rahul Tate	Lagira Zala Ji
Best Anchor	Sankarshan Karhade	Aamhi Saare Khavayye
Best Father	Arun Nimkar	Tula Pahate Re
Best Mother	Pushpa Nimkar	Tula Pahate Re
Best Father-in-law	Vasant Subhedar	Majhya Navaryachi Bayko
Best Mother-in-law	Sarita Subhedar	Majhya Navaryachi Bayko
Best Daughter-in-law	Anjali Gaikwad	Tujhyat Jeev Rangala
Best Child Character	Ladoo	Tujhyat Jeev Rangala
Best Non-fiction Show		Chala Hawa Yeu Dya
Special Striking Face	Isha Nimkar	Tula Pahate Re
Lifetime Achievement Award	Ashok Patki	

== 2019 ==
Category	Winner	Series
Best Series		Aggabai Sasubai
Best Title Song		Aggabai Sasubai
Best Family	Kulkarni Family	Aggabai Sasubai
Best Actor	Mohan Ashtaputre	Bhago Mohan Pyare
Best Actress	Suman Mantri-Patil	Mrs. Mukhyamantri
Best Couple	Abhijeet-Asawari	Aggabai Sasubai
Best Siblings	Baban-Sumi	Mrs. Mukhyamantri
Best Negative Actor	Anna Naik	Ratris Khel Chale 2
Best Negative Actress	Vatsala Naik	Ratris Khel Chale 2
Best Character Male	Anna Naik	Ratris Khel Chale 2
Best Character Female	Kumudini Patankar	Ratris Khel Chale 2
Best Supporting Actor	Chontya	Ratris Khel Chale 2
Best Supporting Actress	Chhaya Naik	Ratris Khel Chale 2
Best Comedy Actor	Mohan Ashtaputre	Bhago Mohan Pyare
Best Comedy Actress	Mandodari Parab	Aggabai Sasubai
Best Father	Vasant Subhedar	Majhya Navaryachi Bayko
Best Mother	Asawari Kulkarni	Aggabai Sasubai
Best Father-in-law	Dattatray Kulkarni	Aggabai Sasubai
Best Mother-in-law	Asawari Kulkarni	Aggabai Sasubai
Best Daughter-in-law	Asawari Kulkarni	Aggabai Sasubai
Best Child Character	Ladoo	Tujhyat Jeev Rangala
Best Non-fiction Show		Ram Ram Maharashtra
Special Striking Face	Shreya Bugde	Chala Hawa Yeu Dya
Lifetime Achievement Award	Ravi Patwardhan	Aggabai Sasubai

== 2020-21 ==
Category	Winner	Series
Best Series		Majha Hoshil Na
Best Title Song		Majha Hoshil Na
Best Family	Brahme Family	Majha Hoshil Na
Best Actor	Omkar Khanvilkar	Yeu Kashi Tashi Me Nandayla
Best Actress	Sai Kashyap	Majha Hoshil Na
Best Couple	Sai-Aditya	Majha Hoshil Na
Best Siblings	Brahme Boys	Majha Hoshil Na
Best Negative Actor	Ajitkumar Dev	Devmanus
Best Negative Actress	Malvika Khanvilkar	Yeu Kashi Tashi Me Nandayla
Best Character Male	Ajitkumar Dev	Devmanus
Best Character Female	Saru Patil	Devmanus
Best Supporting Actor	Shashikant Birajdar	Majha Hoshil Na
Best Supporting Actress	Suman Salvi	Yeu Kashi Tashi Me Nandayla
Best Comedy Actor	Shubhankar Patil	Devmanus
Best Comedy Actress	Saru Patil	Devmanus
Best Father	Vasant Salvi	Yeu Kashi Tashi Me Nandayla
Best Mother	Shakuntala Khanvilkar	Yeu Kashi Tashi Me Nandayla
Best Father-in-law	Sai's five father-in-laws	Majha Hoshil Na
Best Mother-in-law	Asawari Raje	Aggabai Sasubai
Best Daughter-in-law	Shubhra Kulkarni	Aggabai Sasubai
Special Striking Face	Manasi Desai	Majha Hoshil Na
Lifetime Achievement Award	Vinayak Brahme	Majha Hoshil Na

== 2021 ==
Category	Winner	Series
Best Series		Majhi Tujhi Reshimgath
Best Title Song		Majhi Tujhi Reshimgath
Best Family	Deshmukh Family	Tujhya Majhya Sansarala Aani Kay Hava!
Best Actor	Yashwardhan Chaudhari	Majhi Tujhi Reshimgath
Best Actress	Neha Kamat	Majhi Tujhi Reshimgath
Best Couple	Indra-Deepu	Man Udu Udu Jhala
Best Siblings	Sweetu-Chinya	Yeu Kashi Tashi Me Nandayla
Best Negative Actor	Anna Naik	Ratris Khel Chale 3
Best Negative Actress	Malvika Khanvilkar	Yeu Kashi Tashi Me Nandayla
Best Character Male	Sameer	Majhi Tujhi Reshimgath
Best Character Female	Aruna Naik	Majhi Tujhi Reshimgath
Best Supporting Actor	Sayaji	Ratris Khel Chale 3
Best Supporting Actress	Sumitra Deshmukh	Tujhya Majhya Sansarala Aani Kay Hava!
Best Comedy Actor	Sameer	Majhi Tujhi Reshimgath
Best Comedy Actress	Shefali	Majhi Tujhi Reshimgath
Best Father	Manohar Deshpande	Man Udu Udu Jhala
Best Mother	Neha Kamat	Majhi Tujhi Reshimgath
Best Father-in-law	Vasant Salvi	Yeu Kashi Tashi Me Nandayla
Best Mother-in-law	Shankuntala Khanvilkar	Yeu Kashi Tashi Me Nandayla
Best Daughter-in-law	Avani Parab (Sweetu)	Yeu Kashi Tashi Me Nandayla
Best Grandfather	Jagannath Chaudhari	Majhi Tujhi Reshimgath
Best Grandmother	Bayobai Deshmukh	Tujhya Majhya Sansarala Aani Kay Hava!
Best Friends	Yash-Sameer	Majhi Tujhi Reshimgath
Best Child Character	Pari Kamat	Majhi Tujhi Reshimgath
Best Non-fiction Show		Chala Hawa Yeu Dya
Best Anchor	Mrunmayee Deshpande	Sa Re Ga Ma Pa Marathi Li'l Champs
Special Striking Face	Neha Kamat	Majhi Tujhi Reshimgath
Lifetime Achievement Award	Jagannath Chaudhari	Majhi Tujhi Reshimgath
ZEE5 Most Trending Actor	Indrajeet Salgaonkar	Man Udu Udu Jhala
ZEE5 Most Trending Actress	Deepika Deshpande	Man Udu Udu Jhala

== 2022 ==
Category	Winner	Series
Best Series		Nava Gadi Nava Rajya
Best Title Song		Majhi Tujhi Reshimgath
Best Family	Chaudhari Family	Majhi Tujhi Reshimgath
Best Actor	Saurabh Patwardhan	Tu Tevha Tashi
Best Actress	Ashwini Waghmare	Tu Chal Pudha
Best Couple	Yash-Neha	Majhi Tujhi Reshimgath
Best Siblings	Saurabh-Sachin	Tu Tevha Tashi
Best Negative Actor	Akash Joshi	Tu Tevha Tashi
Best Negative Actress	Simmy Chaudhari	Majhi Tujhi Reshimgath
Best Character Male	Sameer	Majhi Tujhi Reshimgath
Best Character Female	Kunda Ranade	Tu Tevha Tashi
Best Supporting Actor	Vishwajeet Chaudhari	Majhi Tujhi Reshimgath
Best Supporting Actress	Radha Joshi	Tu Tevha Tashi
Best Comedy Actor	Sameer	Majhi Tujhi Reshimgath
Best Comedy Actress	Shefali	Majhi Tujhi Reshimgath
Best Father	Raghav Karnik	Nava Gadi Nava Rajya
Best Mother	Neha Chaudhari	Majhi Tujhi Reshimgath
Best Father-in-law	Jagannath Chaudhari	Majhi Tujhi Reshimgath
Best Mother-in-law	Mithila Chaudhari	Majhi Tujhi Reshimgath
Best Daughter-in-law	Neha Chaudhari	Majhi Tujhi Reshimgath
Best Grandfather	Jagannath Chaudhari	Majhi Tujhi Reshimgath
Best Grandmother	Aruna Naik	Majhi Tujhi Reshimgath
Best Friends	Yash-Sameer	Majhi Tujhi Reshimgath
Best Child Character	Pari Kamat	Majhi Tujhi Reshimgath
Best Non-fiction Show		Chala Hawa Yeu Dya
Best Anchor	Sankarshan Karhade	Aamhi Saare Khavayye
Special Striking Face	Anandi Karnik	Nava Gadi Nava Rajya
Lifetime Achievement Award	Rama Joshi	Tu Tevha Tashi

== 2023 ==
Category	Winner	Series
Best Series		Tula Shikvin Changlach Dhada
Best Title Song		Tu Chal Pudha
Best Family	Khot Family	Saara Kahi Tichyasathi
Best Actor	Adhipati Suryavanshi	Tula Shikvin Changlach Dhada
Best Actress	Akshara Suryavanshi	Tula Shikvin Changlach Dhada
Best Couple	Adhipati-Akshara	Tula Shikvin Changlach Dhada
Best Siblings	Ovi-Nishi	Saara Kahi Tichyasathi
Best Negative Actor	Sankalp Dhobale	Appi Aamchi Collector
Best Negative Actress	Bhuvaneshwari Suryavanshi	Tula Shikvin Changlach Dhada
Best Character Male	Raghunath Khot	Saara Kahi Tichyasathi
Best Character Female	Bhuvaneshwari Suryavanshi	Tula Shikvin Changlach Dhada
Best Supporting Actor	Bhalchandra Kulkarni	Satvya Mulichi Satavi Mulgi
Best Supporting Actress	Mayuri Waghmare	Tu Chal Pudha
Best Comedy Actor	Satyabodh Phulpagare	Tula Shikvin Changlach Dhada
Best Comedy Actress	Falguni Rajadhyaksh	Satvya Mulichi Satavi Mulgi
Best Father	Raghunath Khot	Saara Kahi Tichyasathi
Best Mother	Uma Khot	Saara Kahi Tichyasathi
Best Father-in-law	Prakash Waghmare	Tu Chal Pudha
Best Mother-in-law	Sulakshana Karnik	Nava Gadi Nava Rajya
Best Daughter-in-law	Uma Khot	Saara Kahi Tichyasathi
Best Son-in-law	Adhipati Suryavanshi	Tula Shikvin Changlach Dhada
Best Grandfather	Purushottam Patkar	Nava Gadi Nava Rajya
Best Grandmother	Aaji	Tula Shikvin Changlach Dhada
Best Friends	Netra-Falguni	Satvya Mulichi Satavi Mulgi
Best Child Character	Reva Karnik (Chingi)	Nava Gadi Nava Rajya
Best Non-fiction Show		Chala Hawa Yeu Dya
Best Anchor	Mrunmayee Deshpande	Sa Re Ga Ma Pa Marathi Li'l Champs
Special Striking Face	Akshara Suryavanshi	Tula Shikvin Changlach Dhada

== 2024 ==
Category	Winner	Series
Best Series		Paaru
Best Family	Kirloskar Family	Paaru
Best Actor	Aditya Kirloskar	Paaru
Best Actress	Shivani Desai	Shiva
Best Couple	Abhiram-Leela	Navri Mile Hitlerla
Best Brother	Suryakant Jagtap	Lakhat Ek Aamcha Dada
Best Sister	Surya's four sisters	Lakhat Ek Aamcha Dada
Best Negative Actor	Jalindar Nimbalkar	Lakhat Ek Aamcha Dada
Best Negative Actress	Bhuvaneshwari Suryavanshi	Tula Shikvin Changlach Dhada
Best Comedy Actor	Chandan Shrungarpure	Shiva
Best Comedy Actress	Damini Kirloskar	Paaru
Best Supporting Actor	Pritam Kirloskar	Paaru
Best Supporting Actress	Durga Jahagirdar	Navri Mile Hitlerla
Best Father	Akash Thakur	Punha Kartavya Aahe
Best Mother	Ahilya Kirloskar	Paaru
Best Father-in-law	Ramchandra Desai	Shiva
Best Mother-in-law	Leela Jahagirdar	Navri Mile Hitlerla
Best Son-in-law	Abhiram Jahagirdar	Navri Mile Hitlerla
Best Daughter-in-law	Leela Jahagirdar	Navri Mile Hitlerla
Best Grandmother	Janabai Patil	Shiva
Best Child Character	Amol Kadam	Appi Aamchi Collector
Best Friends	Pana Gang	Shiva
Best Son	Adhipati Suryavanshi	Tula Shikvin Changlach Dhada
Best Daughter	Parvati Semse	Paaru
Popular Couple	Arjun-Aparna	Appi Aamchi Collector
Popular Actor	Abhiram Jahagirdar	Navri Mile Hitlerla
Popular Actress	Aparna Kadam	Appi Aamchi Collector
Popular Family	Jahagirdar Family	Navri Mile Hitlerla
Popular Series		Navri Mile Hitlerla
ZEE5 Most Favourite Actor	Ashutosh Desai	Shiva
ZEE5 Most Favourite Actress	Parvati Semse	Paaru
ZEE5 Most Favourite Series		Shiva
Special Striking Face	Leela Jahagirdar	Navri Mile Hitlerla
Lifetime Achievement Award	Shrirang Godbole	

== 2025 ==
Category	Winner	Series
Best Series		Savalyachi Janu Savali
Best Family	Mehendale Family	Savalyachi Janu Savali
Best Actor	Siddhiraj Gade-Patil	Lakshmi Niwas
Best Actress	Savali Mehendale	Savalyachi Janu Savali
Best Couple	Siddhu-Bhavana	Lakshmi Niwas
Best Siblings	Venky-Bhavana-Janhavi	Lakshmi Niwas
Best Character Male	Jagannath Shastri	Savalyachi Janu Savali
Best Negative Actor	Gopal Deshmukh	Devmanus – Madhla Adhyay
Best Negative Actress	Kamini Mahajan	Kamli
Best Comedy Actor	Jitendra	Devmanus – Madhla Adhyay
Best Comedy Actress	Jayanti Bhagwat	Savalyachi Janu Savali
Best Supporting Actor	Vishwa Deshmukh	Lakshmi Niwas
Best Supporting Actress	Renuka Gade-Patil	Lakshmi Niwas
Best Father	Atharva Rampure	Tula Japnar Aahe
Best Mother	Meera / Ambika Rampure	Tula Japnar Aahe
Best Father-in-law	Shriniwas Dalvi	Lakshmi Niwas
Best Mother-in-law	Lakshmi Dalvi	Lakshmi Niwas
Best Son-in-law	Siddhiraj Gade-Patil	Lakshmi Niwas
Best Daughter-in-law	Veena Dalvi	Lakshmi Niwas
Best Grandmother	Annapurna Mahajan	Kamli
Best Child Character	Anandi Gade-Patil	Lakshmi Niwas
Best Friends	Lakshmi-Siddhu	Lakshmi Niwas
Best Son	Aditya Kirloskar	Paaru
Best Daughter	Parvati Semse	Paaru
Best Non-fiction Show		Chala Hawa Yeu Dya
Best Anchor	Abhijeet Khandkekar	Chala Hawa Yeu Dya
Best Anchor	Sankarshan Karhade	Aamhi Saare Khavayye
Popular Couple	Jayant-Janhavi	Lakshmi Niwas
Popular Actor	Sarang Mehendale	Savalyachi Janu Savali
Popular Actress	Kamli Mohite	Kamli
Popular Family	Dalvi Family	Lakshmi Niwas
Popular Series		Lakshmi Niwas
ZEE5 Most Favourite Actor	Jayant Kanitkar	Lakshmi Niwas
ZEE5 Most Favourite Actress	Bhavana Gade-Patil	Lakshmi Niwas
ZEE5 Most Favourite Couple	Sarang-Savali	Savalyachi Janu Savali
ZEE5 Most Watched Series		Savalyachi Janu Savali
ZEE5 Most Favourite Series		Kamli
Special Striking Face	Meera Rampure	Tula Japnar Aahe
Lifetime Achievement Award	Girish Oak	Lakhat Ek Aamcha Dada

== Ugach ==
Category	Winner	Series
Best Lagna Vighna		Lakshmi Niwas
Best Lotpot Scene		Tarini
Best Dhishum Dhishum	Siddhiraj Gade-Patil	Lakshmi Niwas
Best Kadepeti	Nilambari Gade-Patil	Lakshmi Niwas
Best Iluilu	Siddhu-Bhavana	Lakshmi Niwas
Best Zolar	Santosh Dalvi	Lakshmi Niwas
Best Radubai	Lakshmi Dalvi	Lakshmi Niwas
Best Chabuk Dialogue	Martand Jamkar	Devmanus – Madhla Adhyay
Best Maza Chakula	Aditya Kirloskar	Paaru
Best Yeh Catch Nahi Match Hai	Aditya Kirloskar	Paaru
Best Natta-Patta	Parvati Kirloskar	Paaru
Best Bhapav	Damini Kirloskar	Paaru
Best Loveship	Sarang Mehendale	Savalyachi Janu Savali
Best Kanakhali Jaal	Kamli Mohite	Kamli
Gaurav Jeevanacha, Aata Tari Thambnyacha	Anika Mahajan	Kamli

== 2026 ==
Category	Winner	Series
Best Series		Sanai Chaughade
Best Family	Parab Family	Sanai Chaughade
Best Actor	Samar Rajwade	Veen Doghantali Hi Tutena
Best Actress	Sharvari Parab	Sanai Chaughade
Best Couple	Jay-Sharvari	Sanai Chaughade
Best Siblings	Swanandi-Rohan	Veen Doghantali Hi Tutena
Best Character Male	Rohan Sarpotdar	Veen Doghantali Hi Tutena
Best Character Female	Adhira Sarpotdar	Veen Doghantali Hi Tutena
Best Negative Actor	Anshuman Rajwade	Veen Doghantali Hi Tutena
Best Negative Actress	Mallika Rajwade	Veen Doghantali Hi Tutena
Best Comedy Character	Bablu	Savalyachi Janu Savali
Best Supporting Negative Actress	Anika Mahajan	Kamli
Best Supporting Actor	Anand	Veen Doghantali Hi Tutena
Best Supporting Actress	Sharada Jadhav	Krushnaichya Leki
Best Father	Siddhiraj Gade-Patil	Lakshmi Niwas
Best Mother	Bhavana Gade-Patil	Lakshmi Niwas
Best Son-in-law	Kedar Khandekar	Tarini
Best Daughter-in-law	Savali Mehendale	Savalyachi Janu Savali
Best Grandmother	Nalini Rajwade	Veen Doghantali Hi Tutena
Best Child Character	Ira	Tarini
Best Friends	Samar-Anand-Nikita	Veen Doghantali Hi Tutena
Best Son	Hrishi Inamdar	Kamli
Best Daughter	Swanandi Rajwade	Veen Doghantali Hi Tutena
Best Non-fiction Show		Aamhi Saare Khavayye
Best Anchor	Mrunmayee Deshpande	Sa Re Ga Ma Pa Marathi
ZEE5 Best Actor	Jay Khanolkar	Sanai Chaughade
ZEE5 Best Actress	Tarini Khandekar	Tarini
ZEE5 Best Couple	Samar-Swanandi	Veen Doghantali Hi Tutena
ZEE5 Best Series		Tarini
Special Striking Face	Sharvari Parab	Sanai Chaughade
Lifetime Achievement Award	Ila Bhate	Kamli
