= Harshada Khanvilkar =

Indian actress, producer and costume designer

- Born: 2 July 1973 (age 53); Mumbai, Maharashtra
- Occupations: Actress, Producer, Costume designer
- Years active: 1990 – Present
- Known for: Pudhcha Paaul, Rang Majha Vegla, Lakshmi Niwas

Harshada Khanvilkar (born 2 July 1973) is an Indian television, film actress, producer and costume designer. She known for her role in Pudhcha Paaul as Akkasaheb, in Rang Majha Vegla as Saundarya Inamdar and in Lakshmi Niwas as Lakshmi Dalvi.

== Career ==
Harshada completed her study IES King George School and Kirti M. Doongursee College. She quit her law course to pursue acting. Harshada started her career with the Hindi serial Dard, which ran on Doordarshan in the 1990s. In 1999, she landed a role in Aabhalmaya. She is also a costume designer she did many costumes designs for shows.

Thereafter, she acted in many serials such as Gurukul, Oon Paaus, Kalat Nakalat, Astitva...Ek Prem Kahani, Damini, Maziya Priyala Preet Kalena, etc. In 2011, she bagged a role in Pudhcha Paaul as Akkasaheb. She also appeared in Bigg Boss Marathi 1 as guest. In 2019, she played an Inspector role in Ghadge & Suun. She also appeared in Rang Majha Vegla as Saundarya Inamdar. She had the role of Vasundhara in Sukh Mhanje Nakki Kay Asta! and also another role in Mulgi Pasant Aahe!.

== Personal life ==
Khanvilkar has never married. She has stated in interviews that she chose to remain unmarried and has spoken publicly about her decision. She later adopted her sister's son, whom she has raised as her own.

== Filmography ==
=== Films ===
Year	Title	Language	Notes
2005	Dombivli Fast	Marathi	As actor
2007	Tula Shikvin Changlach Dhada	Marathi	As costume designer
2007	Tsunami 81	Hindi	As actor
2007	Saade Maade Teen	Marathi	As costume designer
2008	Checkmate	Marathi	As costume designer
2011	Zhakaas	Marathi	As costume designer
2013	Duniyadari	Marathi	As costume designer
2014	Pyaar Vali Love Story	Marathi	As costume designer
2019	Smile Please	Marathi	Special appearance

=== Television ===
Year	Title	Notes
1990	Dard	Neena's bf sister
1993	All The Best	
1994	Junoon	Secretary
1995	Gharkul	
1995	Hasratein	Chanda
1997-1999	Damini	
1999-2003	Aabhalmaya	Sushma
2001-2002	Astitva...Ek Prem Kahani	Shaguna
2002	Hello Inspector	
2002	Uchapati	
2003	Bedhundh Manachya Lahari	As costume designer
2005-2006	Oon Paaus	
2007-2009	Kalat Nakalat	Kamini Abhyankar
2009	Burey Bhi Hum Bhale Bhi Hum	Rasila
2010-2011	Maziya Priyala Preet Kalena	Sandhya Pendse
2011-2017	Pudhcha Paaul	Akkasaheb Sardeshmukh
2017-2019	Navra Asava Tar Asa	Host
2018	Bigg Boss Marathi season 1	Guest for 1 week
2019	Ghadge & Suun	Inspector Saudamini
2019–2023	Rang Majha Vegla	Saundarya Inamdar
2023–2024	Sukh Mhanje Nakki Kay Asta!	Vasundharadevi Ahirrao
2023–2024	Aata Hou De Dhingana	Contestant
2024	Mulgi Pasant Aahe!	Yashodhara Sarnaik
2024–present	Lakshmi Niwas	Lakshmi Dalvi

=== Producer ===
Year	Title	Medium
2016	Kimayagar	Play
2021-2023	Jau Nako Dur... Baba	Television
