= Kulvadhu (TV series) =

Marathi language TV series

- Genre: Drama
- Directed by: Mahesh Tagde
- Starring: See below
- Composer: Nilesh Moharir
- Country of origin: India
- Original language: Marathi
- No. of episodes: 490

Production
- Producer: Jitendra Gupta
- Production locations: Mumbai, Maharashtra
- Camera setup: Multi-camera
- Running time: 22 minutes
- Production company: Applause Entertainment

Original release
- Network: Zee Marathi
- Release: 17 November 2008 – 12 June 2010

Kulvadhu (transl. Bride) is an Indian Marathi language television series which aired on Zee Marathi. It starred Poorva Gokhale and Subodh Bhave in lead roles. It is produced by Mahesh Tagde and directed by Jitendra Gupta under the banner of Applause Entertainment. It premiered from 17 November 2008 by replacing Ya Sukhano Ya. It ended on 12 June 2010 after completing 490 episodes.

== Plot ==
The story of a simple girl Devyani belonging to the family of Deshmukhs that lay great emphasist on Values and Principles. She is highly unassuming and under confident, but over time stands up to fight for the dignity of her family and herself and emerges as a strong woman. On the other hand there is an affluent family of Ranveer Rajeshirke who heads a huge business empire: The Rajeshirke Group of Companies, that stands at the top. The younger son of the family Vikramaditya gets into a dispute with Devyani over the procurement of a land, being used to run a school. Devyani is a teacher at this school and fights back to protect the land.

== Cast ==
=== Main ===
- Poorva Gokhale as Devyani Damodar Deshmukh / Devyani Vikramaditya Rajeshirke
- Subodh Bhave as Vikramaditya Rajeshirke

=== Recurring ===
- Milind Gunaji as Ranveer Rajeshirke (Bhaiyyasaheb)
- Ashalata Wabgaonkar as Sai Maa
- Nishigandha Wad as Priyadarshini Rajeshirke
- Shailesh Datar as Indraneel Rajeshirke
- Sadashiv Amrapurkar as Damodar Vinayak Deshmukh
- Sulabha Deshpande as Godavari Deshmukh
- Supriya Pathare as Abhilasha Deshmukh
- Pallavi Vaidya as Sakshi Deshmukh
- Meghana Vaidya as Pratiksha Deshmukh
- Sai Ranade as Shravani Deshmukh
- Vaibhav Mangle
- Lokesh Gupte
- Vikas Patil
- Ranjeet Jog
- Pooja Nayak
- Ila Bhate
- Milind Phatak
- Kirti Pendharkar
- Samiksha Manjrekar

== Awards ==
Zee Marathi Utsav Natyancha Awards 2009
Category	Recipient	Role
Best Actress	Poorva Gokhale	Devyani
Best Actor	Subodh Bhave	Vikramaditya
Best Negative Actor	Milind Gunaji	Ranveer
Best Couple	Poorva Gokhale-Subodh Bhave	Devyani-Vikramaditya
Best Siblings	Poorva Gokhale-Pallavi Vaidya	Devyani-Sakshi
Best Supporting Female	Sulabha Deshpande	Godavari
Best Character Male	Sadashiv Amrapurkar	Damodar
Best Lyricist	Ashwini Shende	
Best Title Song	Vaishali Mhade	
Best Series		

== Reception ==
Week	Year	TAM TVR	Rank		Ref.
Week	Year	TAM TVR	Mah/Goa	All India	Ref.
week 47	2008	0.84	4	64	
Week 22	2009	0.8	3	83	
Week 26	2009	0.84	1	78	
Week 28	2009	0.71	2	94	
Week 29	2009	0.8	2	86	
Week 33	2009	0.8	3	91	
Week 40	2009	0.84	4	80	
Week 45	2009	0.8	1	85	
Week 52	2009	0.8	5	96	
