= Maha Minister =

Marathi-language reality game show

- Genre: Reality show
- Starring: Aadesh Bandekar
- Country of origin: India
- Original language: Marathi
- No. of episodes: 77

Production
- Camera setup: Multi-camera
- Running time: 22 minutes

Original release
- Network: Zee Marathi
- Release: 11 April – 26 June 2022

Related
- Home Minister

Maha Minister (transl. Mega Minister) is an Indian Marathi language television reality series which aired on Zee Marathi. It was hosted by Aadesh Bandekar which was held in 10 cities in Maharashtra. This game show was related to Home Minister. It premiered from 11 April 2022 and aired Grand Finale on 26 June 2022.

== Auditions ==
- Nashik
- Thane
- Aurangabad
- Pune
- Solapur
- Panvel
- Ahmednagar
- Ratnagiri
- Kolhapur
- Nagpur

== Finalists ==
- Laxmi Dhekane (Winner)
- Rupali Pakhare
- Suvarna Pendhare
- Sharayu Patil
- Kaveri Matre
- Sapna Rangdal
- Sonali Patil
- Apeksha Pawar
- Saloni Yewalekar
- Nivedita Gurubhele
