= Sharmishtha Raut =

Indian actress (born 1984)

- Born: 22 April 1984 (age 42); Mumbai, Maharashtra, India
- Occupation: Actress
- Years active: 2009–present
- Spouses: Amey Nipankar (m. 2014; div. 2018); Tejas Desai (m. 2020)
- Children: 1

Sharmishtha Desai (née Raut) is an Indian actress who works predominantly in Marathi films and television.

== Early life and career ==
Raut was born on 22 April 1984, and raised in Mumbai. At a very young age, she started learning Bharatanatyam.

She portrayed Neeraja in the series Man Udhan Varyache, a Bengali remake of Bou Kotha Kao which aired on Star Pravah. In the Zee Marathi series Unch Majha Zoka, she played the role of Tai Kaku. Her other television appearances include Julun Yeti Reshimgathi, Sukhachya Sarini He Man Baware, Mulgi Zali Ho, Aboli and Swarajya Janani Jijamata.

Raut appeared in the first season of Bigg Boss Marathi in May 2018. She turned into a producer for the TV series Tula Shikvin Changlach Dhada.

== Filmography ==
Year	Title	Role	Notes	Ref
2013	Yoddha		Debut	
2013	Rangkarmi	Revati		
2017	Chi Va Chi Sau Ka	Ragini		
2024	Nach Ga Ghuma	Kalyani		
2024	Hashtag Tadev Lagnam	Ishaa		

== Television ==
=== As an actor ===
Year	Title	Role	Channel	Notes	Ref.
2009-2011	Man Udhan Varyache	Neeraja Mohite	Star Pravah		
2012-2013	Unch Majha Zoka	Tai Kaku	Zee Marathi		
2013-2015	Julun Yeti Reshimgathi	Archana Dusane	Zee Marathi		
2014	Fu Bai Fu	Contestant	Zee Marathi		
2017	Aaj Kaay Special	Special appearance	Colors Marathi		
2018	Bigg Boss Marathi 1	Contestant	Colors Marathi	Wildcard	
2019	Swarajyajanani Jijamata	Roshanara Begum	Sony Marathi		
2018-2020	Sukhachya Sarini He Man Baware	Sanyogeeta Tatwawadi	Colors Marathi		
2021	Mulgi Zali Ho	Nilima Sawant	Star Pravah		
2021-2025	Aboli	Neeta	Star Pravah		
2023	Saara Kahi Tichyasathi	Sandhya	Zee Marathi		
2026	Suna Yeti Ghara	Padmavati	Star Pravah		

=== As a Producer ===
1. Navri Mile Hitlerla
2. Tula Shikvin Changlach Dhada
3. Tarini
4. Kajalmaya

=== Web series ===
Year	Name	Role	Notes
2024	Raisinghani VS Raisinghani	Jyoti	
