= Appi Aamchi Collector =

2022 Indian Marathi language TV series

- Genre: Drama
- Starring: See below
- Country of origin: India
- Original language: Marathi
- No. of episodes: 845

Production
- Producers: Shweta Shinde; Sanjay Khambe
- Production locations: Satara, Maharashtra
- Camera setup: Multi-camera
- Running time: 22 minutes
- Production company: Vajra Production

Original release
- Network: Zee Marathi
- Release: 22 August 2022 – 15 March 2025

Appi Aamchi Collector (transl. Appi Our Collector) is an Indian Marathi language TV series which aired on Zee Marathi. It is produced by Shweta Shinde under the banner of Vajra Production. It premiered from 22 August 2022 by replacing Satyawan Savitri. It starred Shivani Naik and Rohit Parshuram in lead roles. The show ended on 15 March 2025 completing 845 episodes.

== Plot ==
An inspirational journey of an ordinary village girl Appi, who fights against all odds and becomes a collector. Life takes a turn when Appi falls in love with a corrupt police officer, Arjun.

== Cast ==
=== Main ===
- Shivani Naik as Collector Aparna Suresh Mane / Aparna Arjun Kadam (Appi)
- Rohit Parshuram as Arjun Vinayak Kadam (Shahenshah)
- Sairaj Kendre as Amol Arjun Kadam (Simba) - Appi-Arjun's son

=== Recurring ===
Arjun's family

- Pradeep Kothmire as Hambir Bhaurao Kadam (Sarkar) - Arjun's uncle
- Daya Eksammekar / Shubhada Naik as Rukmini Hambirrao Kadam - Arjun's aunt
- Shrikant K.T. as Vinayak Bhaurao Kadam - Arjun's father
- Aarti Shinde as Smita Bhaurao Kadam - Arjun's paternal aunt
- Makarand Gosavi as Swapnil Hambirrao Kadam - Arjun's brother
- Sarita Nalawade as Rupali Swapnil Kadam - Swapnil's wife
- Rushabh Kondavar as Sujay Hambirrao Kadam - Arjun's brother
- Neelam Wadekar as Priyanka Sujay Kadam (Piyu) - Sujay's wife, Appi's friend
- Vajra Pawar as Arnav Sujay Kadam - Sujay's son

Appi's family

- Santosh Patil as Suresh Balkoba Mane (Bapu) - Appi's father
- Beena Siddharth / Neeta Donde as Sushma Suresh Mane - Appi's mother
- Aditya Bhosale as Deepak Suresh Mane (Dipya) - Appi's brother
- Jyotsna Patil as Monika Deepak Mane (Mona) - Dipya's wife

Others

- Ujjwal Nikam as Interviewer
- Shraddha Mangle as Aarya - Arjun's fiance
- Sunil Dongar as Sankalp Dhobale (Banti)
- Pushpa Chaudhari as Manisha Dhobale - Sankalp's mother
- Shivani Ghatge as Geetanjali Jadhav
- Shekhar Sawant as Vijay Pandurang Chinchoke
- Sachin Sawant as Girish Gaikwad
- Prem Jadhav as Prithvi Prataprao Jadhav
- Rajbhushan Sahastrabuddhe as Prataprao Jadhav
- Swara Patil as Chakuli
- Bhakti Zanzane as Sunanda
- Sunil Shetye as Collector
- Nilam Panchal as Madamsir
- Pradeep Walke as Rakesh (Rocket)
- Madhav Solaskar as Aslam
- Sunil Nalawade as Yashwant
- Amit Kulkarni as Amit Shetty
- Ajitkumar Koshti as Mr. Shirke
- Sachin Shirke as Mr. Gaitonde
- Nilesh Gaware as Mr. Jadhav

== Awards ==
Zee Marathi Utsav Natyancha Awards
Year	Category	Recipient	Role	Ref.
2023	Best Negative Actor	Sunil Dongar	Sankalp Dhoble (Banti)	
2024	Best Child Actor	Sairaj Kendre	Amol Kadam (Simba)	
2024	Popular Couple	Rohit Parshuram-Shivani Naik	Arjun-Aparna	
2024	Popular Actress	Shivani Naik	Aparna Kadam	

== Reception ==
=== Special episodes (1 hour) ===
- 20 November 2022
- 25 December 2022
- 15 January 2023
- 19 February 2023
- 19 March 2023
- 16 April 2023
- 7 May 2023
- 4 June 2023
- 9 July 2023
- 20 August 2023
- 3 September 2023
- 12 November 2023
- 17 December 2023
- 21 January 2024
- 25 February 2024
- 10 March 2024
- 18 August 2024
- 8 September 2024

=== Seasons ===
- 1 May 2024 (7 years later)

=== Airing history ===
No.	Airing Date	Days	Time (IST)	Ref.
1	22 August 2022 – 20 August 2023	Mon-Sat (sometimes Sun)	7 pm	
2	21 August 2023 – 13 January 2024	Mon-Sat (sometimes Sun)	6.30 pm	
3	15 January – 22 September 2024	Mon-Sat (sometimes Sun)	7 pm	
4	23 September 2024 – 15 March 2025	Mon-Sat (sometimes Sun)	6.30 pm	
