= Tu Tevha Tashi =

Marathi-language TV series

- Genre: Romance
- Written by: Priya Ramanathan
- Directed by: Mandar Devasthali; Maruti Bhagirathi
- Starring: See below
- Voices of: Abhay Jodhpurkar
- Composer: Sameer Saptiskar
- Country of origin: India
- Original language: Marathi
- No. of episodes: 334

Production
- Producer: Sandeep Jadhav
- Production locations: Pune, Maharashtra, India
- Camera setup: Multi-camera
- Running time: 22 minutes
- Production company: Ekasmai Creations

Original release
- Network: Zee Marathi
- Release: 20 March 2022 – 26 March 2023

Tu Tevha Tashi (transl. You, Then, Like that) is an Indian Marathi language drama television series which aired on Zee Marathi. It is directed by Mandar Devasthali and produced by Sandeep Jadhav under the banner of Ekasmai Creations. It premiered from 20 March 2022 by replacing Yeu Kashi Tashi Me Nandayla. It starred Swapnil Joshi and Shilpa Tulaskar in lead roles with Abhidnya Bhave and Suhas Joshi in supporting roles.

== Plot ==
Anamika Dixit is a self-employed businesswoman and Saurabh Patwardhan is a job seeker. Anamika is separated from her husband and lives with her mother-in-law Rama Joshi and daughter Radha Dixit whereas Saurabh lives with his brother Sachin, sister-in-law Pushpavalli, and aunt Kunda Maimavshi. As Sachin is unemployed, Pushpavalli and her father Appa are always robbing Saurabh by putting on acts while Radha is proud of money.

Saurabh and Anamika, friends in college, meet after several years due to their friend Chandu Chimane. Saurabh loves Anamika but has promised his late parents that he will not get married unless Sachin stands on his own feet. Pushpavalli does not want him to marry her because she thinks that if Anamika comes to their house, she will be the owner of it. Maimavshi has a mouthful but she loves Saurabh as her own son and wants him to marry Anamika. However, things take a turn when Anamika's mother Kaveri Dixit arrives in town and decides to separate her from Saurabh. The series ends with Anamika and Saurabh agreeing to have a live-in relationship for life.

== Cast ==
=== Main ===
- Shilpa Tulaskar as Anamika Dixit: Kaveri's daughter; Akash's ex-wife; Saurabh's love interest; Radha's mother
- Swapnil Joshi as Saurabh "Patya" Patwardhan: Kunda's nephew and foster son; Sachin's brother; Anamika's love interest; Radha's father-figure

=== Recurring ===
Saurabh's family

- Abhidnya Bhave as Pushpavalli "Valli" Eadke Patwardhan: Moropant's daughter; Sachin's wife
- Abhishek Rahalkar as Sachin "Sachu" Patwardhan: Kunda's nephew and foster son; Saurabh's brother; Valli's husband
- Ujjwala Jog as Kunda "Maimavshi" Ranade: Saurabh and Sachin's aunt and foster mother
- Sunil Godbole as Moropant "Appa" Edake: Valli's father

Anamika's family

- Suhas Joshi as Rama Joshi: Akash's mother; Anamika's mother-figure; Radha's grandmother
- Roomani Khare as Radha Joshi Jalgaonkar: Anamika and Akash's daughter; Saurabh's daughter-figure; Hiten's ex-girlfriend; Neil's wife
- Swanand Ketkar as Neil Jalgaonkar: Nana and Mrs. Jalgaonkar's son; Anamika's employee; Radha's husband
- Ashok Samarth as Akash Joshi: Rama's son; Anamika's ex-husband; Radha's father
- Rama Nadgauda as Kaveri Dixit: Anamika's mother; Radha's grandmother

=== Others ===
- Kiran Bhalerao as Chandu Chimane: Saurabh and Anamika's friend; Chimani's husband
- Disha Danade as Chimani Chimane: Chandu's wife
- Bhagya Nair as Riya Nair: Sachin's boss
- Meera Welankar as Chitralekha: Anamika's friend
- Vikas Verma as Hiten Sheth: Champak and Mrs. Sheth's son; Radha's ex-boyfriend
- Hitesh Sampat as Champak Sheth: Hiten's father
- Sarala Jain as Mrs. Sheth: Hiten's mother
- Dilip Wagh as Nana Jalgoankar: Neil's father
- Swati Dharap as Mrs. Jalgaonkar: Neil's mother

Office workers

- Sandeep Huparikar as Mr. Ekbote
- Ashwin Bornare as Chintamani
- Dnyaneshwari Deshpande as Chandani
- Pooja Kamble as Rohini
- Varsha Samant as Mrs. Shende
- Sunil Khandagale as Mr. Shirke
- Upendra Velankar as Mr. Ghorpade
- Priyanka Sathe as Receptionist

== Production ==
=== Development ===
Mandar Devasthali, who directs the series for Zee Marathi stating, "We always try to do something new. Many ongoing love stories may have been told, but the story of the remaining love may have come, but we tell it in a new way. That's what makes this series so different. I am sure that the audience will also like the story of this series."

=== Casting ===
Swapnil Joshi was selected for the role of Saurabh Patwardhan. Shilpa Tulaskar selected for the role of Anamika Dixit. Roomani Khare daughter of Sandeep Khare debut with this series. Abhidnya Bhave comeback with the role of Pushpavalli.

=== Filming ===
The series filmed mainly in Pune. Their particular spot on JM Road, Bal Gandharva Ranga Mandir, Chhatrapati Sambhajiraje Udyan.

== Reception ==
=== Special episode ===
==== 1 hour ====
1. 20 March 2022
2. 10 April 2022
3. 17 April 2022
4. 19 June 2022
5. 31 July 2022
6. 14 August 2022
7. 26 March 2023

==== 2 hours ====
- 6 November 2022 (Akash-Anamika's marriage)

=== Airing history ===
No.	Airing Date	Days	Time (IST)
1	20 March – 6 November 2022	Mon-Sat (sometimes Sun)	8 pm
2	7 November 2022 – 26 March 2023	Mon-Sat (sometimes Sun)	11 pm

== Awards ==
Zee Marathi Utsav Natyancha Awards 2022
Category	Recipient	Role	Ref.
Best Actor	Swapnil Joshi	Saurabh Patwardhan	
Best Siblings	Swapnil Joshi-Abhishek Rahalkar	Saurabh-Sachin	
Best Negative Actor	Ashok Samarth	Akash Joshi	
Best Character Female	Ujjwala Jog	Kunda Ranade	
Best Supporting Female	Roomani Khare	Radha Joshi	
