= Maharashtrachi Kitchen Queen =

Marathi language cookery game show

- Genre: Cookery
- Starring: Sankarshan Karhade
- Country of origin: India
- Original language: Marathi
- No. of episodes: 78

Production
- Camera setup: Multi-camera
- Running time: 22 minutes
- Production company: Zee Studios

Original release
- Network: Zee Marathi
- Release: 15 May – 12 August 2023

Maharashtrachi Kitchen Queen is an Indian Marathi language TV cookery game show which aired on Zee Marathi. It premiered from 15 May 2023 and hosted by Sankarshan Karhade. It ended on 12 August 2023 after 78 episodes.

== Plot ==
Home chefs from across Maharashtra display their culinary skills and battle it out in a contest to win the title of Maharashtrachi Kitchen Queen.
