= Nava Gadi Nava Rajya =

2022 Indian Marathi language TV series

- Genre: Drama
- Written by: Pralhad Kudtarkar
- Directed by: Shailesh Dhere
- Starring: See below
- Country of origin: India
- Original language: Marathi
- No. of episodes: 442

Production
- Producers: Shruti Marathe; Gaurav Ghatanekar
- Production locations: Mumbai, Maharashtra, India
- Running time: 22 minutes
- Production company: Black Coffee Production

Original release
- Network: Zee Marathi
- Release: 8 August 2022 – 23 December 2023

Nava Gadi Nava Rajya (transl. New Member New Rule) is an Indian Marathi language television series which aired on Zee Marathi. It stars Pallavi Patil, Anita Date-Kelkar and Kashyap Parulekar in lead roles. It premiered from 8 August 2022 by replacing Tujhya Majhya Sansarala Aani Kay Hava!

It is directed by Shailesh Dhere and produced by Shruti Marathe and Gaurav Ghatnekar under the banner of Black Coffee Production. It ended on 23 December 2023 completing 442 episodes.

== Summary ==
Anandi is a village girl who has dream of happy married life. She gets engaged to Raghav Karnik who has already married and had one daughter, but still Anandi married to Raghav and Raghav's first wife was deceased but her spirit is spoiling their marriage.

== Plot ==
Raghav Karnik, a widowed corporate lawyer who lives with his daughter Reva Raghav Karnik a.k.a. Chingi, his mother Sulakshana and frequently visited younger Varsha and with the spirit of his deceased wife Rama. Elsewhere, Anandi Parab a simpleton village girl lives in Anjarle, Konkan region with his father and also frequently visited by her elder sisters. With Rama no more, Raghav takes care of his family but is not able to manage it single handedly. Sulakshana wants him to marry another girl so that she can be free of work. She visits Anandi in her village along with Varsha to fix her marriage with Raghav without his knowledge and also hiding his previous marriage truth. Anandi and her father accept the proposal. Raghav learns about this and leaves for Konkan to tell Anandi and her family the truth. The family earlier shocked bit later accepts the marriage proposal due to Raghav's kind heartedness. Rama feels dejected and tries to break this alliance but fails. Raghav and Anandi get married and Rama is freed from the photo frame and reaches the wedding dias. Rama learns that no one can see her other than Anandi who also wears the same Mangalsutra which Rama did. Rama learns that the Mangalsutra is the connection between her and Anandi.

Everyone shift back to Mumbai and Raghav and Anandi start their marital life. Chingi doesn't readily accept Anandi as her mother. Rama becomes envious of Anandi as she takes over her responsibilities and place in the Kanik house. Rama introduces herself as Mrs. Kolate, Rama's best friend and their neighbour to Anandi and befriends her. Rama repeatedly misguides Anandi about the Karnik to create confusion in the family but always fails. Chingi and Anandi bond together well, also Raghav and Anandi become comfortable with each other. Seeing this, Rama feels more jealous and envious. Anandi also try to bond with Rama's parents who live in the same building but they everytime demean her. Soon real Mrs. Kolate arrives and Anandi learns Rama's fake identity. On the occasion of Pitru-Paksha Amavasya, Rama reveals her real identity to Anandi to which she gets immensely scared.

== Cast ==
=== Main ===
- Pallavi Patil as Anandi Waman Parab / Anandi Raghav Karnik
- Anita Date-Kelkar as Rama Purushottam Patkar / Rama Raghav Karnik
- Kashyap Parulekar as Raghav Madhav Karnik

=== Recurring ===
Raghav's family

- Saisha Bhoir / Aarohi Sambre as Reva Raghav Karnik (Chingi)
- Varsha Dandale as Sulakshana Madhav Karnik
- Kirti Pendharkar as Varsha Madhav Karnik / Varsha Atul Bhutkar / Varsha Shivanand Gawade
- Sanjay Kshemkalyani as Madhav Karnik
- Mrunal Chemburkar as Malati Purushottam Patkar
- Pankaj Chemburkar as Purushottam Patkar

Anandi's family

- Abhay Khadapkar as Waman Parab (Aaba)
- Prajakta Wadye as Maai Waman Parab
- Shripad Padwal as Tagya
- Sachin Kamble as Baban

Others

- Aniruddha Harip as Atul Bhutkar
- Shekhar Phadke as Shivanand Gawade (Nandu)
- Sanjivani Jadhav as Indu Gawade
- Manasi Naik as Rasika Gawade
- Aakanksha Gade as Yojana
- Saurabh Gokhale as Viraj Inamdar
- Akshata Naik as Manisha Atul Bhutkar
- Milind Joshi as Raghav's boss
- Siddheshwar Zadbuke as Chitragupta
- Manasi Bapat as Mrs. Kolate
- Bhushan Telang as Mr. Sahastrabuddhe
- Aditi Sarangdhar as Mrs. Barve
- Disha Pardeshi as Poonam

== Awards ==
Zee Marathi Utsav Natyancha Awards
Year	Category	Recipient	Role	Ref.
2022	Best Father	Kashyap Parulekar	Raghav Karnik	
2022	Best Series	Shruti Marathe	Producer	
2023	Best Child Character	Aarohi Sambre	Reva Karnik (Chingi)	
2023	Best Mother-in-law	Varsha Dandale	Sulakshana Karnik	
2023	Best Grandfather	Pankaj Chemburkar	Purushottam Patkar	

=== Special episode (1 hour) ===
1. 25 September 2022
2. 13 November 2022
3. 1 January 2023
4. 12 March 2023
5. 7 May 2023
6. 4 June 2023
7. 16 July 2023
8. 12 November 2023
