= Tula Shikvin Changlach Dhada =

2023 Indian Marathi language TV series

- Genre: Drama
- Written by: Madhugandha Kulkarni
- Directed by: Chandrakant Gaikwad
- Starring: See below
- Country of origin: India
- Original language: Marathi
- No. of episodes: 736

Production
- Producers: Sharmishtha Raut; Tejas Desai
- Production locations: Kolhapur, Maharashtra
- Camera setup: Multi-camera
- Running time: 22 minutes
- Production company: Ericon Telefilms

Original release
- Network: Zee Marathi
- Release: 13 March 2023 – 25 May 2025

Tula Shikvin Changlach Dhada (transl. I will teach you a good lesson) is an Indian Marathi language TV series which aired on Zee Marathi. It starred Hrishikesh Shelar, Kavita Lad and Shivani Rangole in lead roles. It is produced by Sharmishtha Raut and Tejas Desai under the banner of Ericon Telefilms. The series premiered from 13 March 2023 and ended on 25 May 2025 completing 736 episodes. It is directed by Chandrakant Gaikwad and written by Madhugandha Kulkarni.

== Plot ==
Having contrasting mindsets, sparks fly when Akshara, a teacher who values education encounters Bhuvaneshwari, a rich woman for whom money means everything.

== Cast ==
=== Main ===
- Shivani Rangole as Akshara Jaideo Aamonkar / Akshara Adhipati Suryavanshi
- Hrishikesh Shelar as Adhipati Charuhas Suryavanshi

=== Recurring ===
Suryavanshi family

- Kavita Lad as Bhuvaneshwari Charuhas Suryavanshi (Charulata)
- Swapnil Rajshekhar as Charuhas Suryavanshi
- Sandhya Mhatre as Aaji
- Dipti Sonawane as Durgeshwari Vichare
- Virisha Naik as Chanchala Vichare

Aamonkar family

- Devendra Deo as Jaideo Aamonkar
- Ruta Kale as Ira Jaideo Aamonkar
- Ruplaxmi Shinde as Vidya Jaideo Aamonkar

Others

- Vijay Gokhale as Satyabodh Phulpagare
- Akshay Vinchurkar as Kamal Kanfade
- Pranita Salunkhe as Meena Mohite
- Saniya Chaudhari as Sargam
- Tejas Barve as Madan
- Mayur More as Nikhil
- Gauri Sonar as Shivani
- Om Rane as Omkar
- Pankaj Panchariya as Ravya
- Pravin Prabhakar as Pavya
- Nikhil Rajeshirke as Sarvadnya
- Rucha Modak as Sumati
- Prajakta Dhere as Mitali
- Ravindra Kulkarni

== Awards ==
Zee Marathi Utsav Natyancha Awards
Year	Category	Recipient	Role	Ref.
2023	Best Actor	Hrishikesh Shelar	Adhipati Suryavanshi	
2023	Best Son-in-law	Hrishikesh Shelar	Adhipati Suryavanshi	
2023	Best Character Female	Kavita Lad	Bhuvaneshwari Suryavanshi	
2023	Best Negative Actress	Kavita Lad	Bhuvaneshwari Suryavanshi	
2023	Best Actress	Shivani Rangole	Akshara Suryavanshi	
2023	Best Couple	Shivani Rangole-Hrishikesh Shelar	Akshara-Adhipati	
2023	Best Comedy Male	Vijay Gokhale	Satyabodh Phulpagare	
2023	Best Grandmother	Sandhya Mhatre	Aaji	
2023	Best Series	Sharmishtha Raut	Producer	
2024	Best Son	Hrishikesh Shelar	Adhipati Suryavanshi	
2024	Best Negative Actress	Kavita Lad	Bhuvaneshwari Suryavanshi	

== Reception ==
=== Mahasangam ===
Date	Series	Ref.
20–26 November 2023	Saara Kahi Tichyasathi	

=== Special episodes ===
1 hour

- 11 June 2023
- 9 July 2023
- 30 July 2023
- 20 August 2023
- 3 September 2023
- 19 November 2023
- 7 January 2024
- 28 January 2024
- 4 February 2024
- 3 March 2024
- 30 March 2025
- 6 April 2025
- 27 April 2025
- 25 May 2025

2 hours

- 1 October 2023 (Adhipati-Akshara's marriage)

=== Airing history ===
No.	Airing Date	Days	Time (IST)	Ref.
1	13 March 2023 – 22 December 2024	Mon-Sat (sometimes Sun)	8 pm	
2	23 December 2024 – 15 February 2025	Mon-Sat (sometimes Sun)	10.30 pm	
3	17 February – 14 March 2025	Mon-Sat (sometimes Sun)	11 pm	
4	17 March – 25 May 2025	Mon-Sat (sometimes Sun)	6 pm	

== Adaptations ==
Language	Title	Original Release	Network(s)	Last aired	Notes	Ref.
Marathi	Tula Shikvin Changlach Dhada तुला शिकवीन चांगलाच धडा	13 March 2023	Zee Marathi	25 May 2025	Original	
Hindi	Main Teri Parchhai मैं तेरी परछाई	21 July 2025	Zee TV	1 September 2025	Dubbed	
Kannada	Jodi Hakki ಜೋಡಿ ಹಕ್ಕಿ	25 August 2025	Zee Power	13 February 2026	Remake	
