= Saara Kahi Tichyasathi =

2023 Indian Marathi language TV series

- Genre: Drama
- Written by: Pralhad Kudtarkar
- Starring: See below
- Country of origin: India
- Original language: Marathi
- No. of episodes: 361

Production
- Producers: Hemant Ruprel; Ranjit Thakur
- Production locations: Konkan, Maharashtra
- Camera setup: Multi-camera
- Running time: 22 minutes
- Production company: Frames Production

Original release
- Network: Zee Marathi
- Release: 21 August 2023 – 14 September 2024

Related
- Sapne Suhane Ladakpan Ke

Saara Kahi Tichyasathi (transl. Everything for her) is an Indian Marathi language TV series which aired on Zee Marathi. It premiered from 21 August 2023 by replacing Yashoda – Goshta Shyamchya Aaichi. It starred Khushboo Tawde, Pallavi Vaidya and Ashok Shinde in lead roles.

It is written by Pralhad Kudtarkar and produced by Hemant Ruprel, Ranjit Thakur under the banner of Frames Production. It is an official remake of Hindi TV series Sapne Suhane Ladakpan Ke. The show ended on 14 September 2024 completing 361 episodes.

== Plot ==
Two sisters’ inseparable bond falls prey to a misunderstanding. Despite the growing distance adding fuel to the fire, the destiny and circumstances bring them back together.

== Cast ==
=== Main ===
- Khushboo Tawde / Pallavi Vaidya as Uma Raghunath Khot - Sandhya's sister
- Ashok Shinde as Raghunath (Dada) Khot - Uma's husband

=== Recurring ===
Khot family

- Dakshata Joil as Nishigandha (Nishi) Raghunath Khot / Nishigandha Neeraj Sachdev - Uma's daughter
- Ragini Samant as Daichi Khot - Dada's mother
- Shashikant Kerkar as Rajaram (Bandhu) Khot - Dada's brother
- Vaishali Bhosale as Manjusha (Manju) Rajaram Khot - Rajaram's wife
- Swaraj Pawar as Durgesh (Duggu) Rajaram Khot - Rajaram's son

Desai family

- Ruchi Kadam as Ovi Vijay Desai / Ovi Shrinivas Sawant - Sandhya's daughter
- Sharmishtha Raut as Sandhya Vijay Desai - Uma's sister
- Jayant Jathar as Vijay Desai - Ovi's father

Sawant family

- Siddhirupa Karmarkar as Lalan (Laali) Shrikant Sawant - Dada's sister
- Abhishek Gaonkar as Shrinivas (Shreenu) Shrikant Sawant - Laali's son
- Sandesh Upasham as Shrikant Sawant - Laali's husband

Sachdev family

- Neeraj Goswami as Neeraj Sahil Sachdev - Nishi's husband
- Pradnya Jadhav as Meghana Sahil Sachdev - Neeraj's mother
- Sahil Saini as Sahil Sachdev - Neeraj's father
- Meenal Vaishnav as Saloni Sachdev - Neeraj's aunt
- Guru Divekar as Puneet - Saloni's son

Others

- Palvi Kadam as Charushila (Chaaru) Shashikant Parab - Manju's niece
- Vineet Mainkar as Shashikant Parab - Manju's brother
- Akshata Ukirde as Nikita - Neeraj's friend
- Nikita Zepale as Chhaya - Nishi's friend

== Adaptations ==
Language	Title	Original release	Network(s)	Last aired	Notes
Hindi	Sapne Suhane Ladakpan Ke सपने सुहाने लडकपन के	21 May 2012	Zee TV	23 January 2015	Original
Kannada	Megha Mayuri ಮೇಘಾ ಮಯೂರಿ	13 January 2014	Zee Kannada	17 January 2015	Remake
Telugu	Padamati Sandhyaragam పడమటి సంధ్యారాగం	19 September 2022	Zee Telugu	Ongoing	Remake
Marathi	Saara Kahi Tichyasathi सारं काही तिच्यासाठी	21 August 2023	Zee Marathi	14 September 2024	Remake
Odia	Sandhya Ragini ସାନ୍ଧ୍ୟା ରାଗିଣୀ	2 October 2023	Zee Sarthak	24 May 2025	Remake
Tamil	Sandhya Raagam சந்தியா ராகம்	9 October 2023	Zee Tamil	Ongoing	Remake

== Awards ==
Zee Marathi Utsav Natyancha Awards 2023
Category	Recipient	Role
Best Character Male	Ashok Shinde	Raghunath Khot (Dada)
Best Father	Ashok Shinde	Raghunath Khot (Dada)
Best Daughter-in-law	Khushboo Tawde	Uma Khot
Best Mother	Khushboo Tawde	Uma Khot
Best Siblings	Ruchi Kadam-Dakshata Joil	Ovi-Nishigandha
Best Family	Khot Family	

== Reception ==
=== Special episode (1 hour) ===
- 7 January 2024
- 28 January 2024
- 4 February 2024
- 3 March 2024

=== Mahasangam ===
Date	Series	Ref.
20–26 November 2023	Tula Shikvin Changlach Dhada	

=== Airing history ===
No.	Airing Date	Days	Time (IST)	Ref.
1	21 August – 28 October 2023	Mon-Sat (sometimes Sun)	7 pm	
2	30 October 2023 – 10 February 2024	Mon-Sat (sometimes Sun)	7.30 pm	
3	12 February – 6 July 2024	Mon-Sat (sometimes Sun)	8.30 pm	
4	7 July – 14 September 2024	Mon-Sat (sometimes Sun)	6.30 pm	
