= Marathi Paaul Padte Pudhe =

Marathi talent hunt reality show

- Presented by: Jitendra Joshi
- Judges: Urmila Matondkar; Makarand Anaspure
- Composer: Shrirang Godbole
- Country of origin: India
- Original language: Marathi
- No. of seasons: 2

Production
- Producer: Nitin Chandrakant Desai
- Production locations: Mumbai, Maharashtra
- Camera setup: Multi-camera
- Running time: 45 minutes

Original release
- Network: Zee Marathi
- Release: 24 January 2011 – 5 February 2012

Marathi Paaul Padte Pudhe (transl. Marathi steps forward) is an Indian Marathi language talent hunt TV reality show which aired on Zee Marathi. It was hosted by Jitendra Joshi and judged by Makarand Anaspure and Urmila Matondkar. It premiered from 24 January 2011 and ended on 5 February 2012 airing two seasons.

== Seasons ==
Season	Originally Broadcast		Name
Season	First aired	Last aired	Name
1	24 January 2011	5 June 2011	Season 1
2	24 October 2011	5 February 2012	Atakepar Zenda

== Awards ==
Zee Marathi Utsav Natyancha Awards
Year	Category	Recipient
2011	Best Title Song	
2011	Best Reality Show	
2011	Best Lyricist	Shrirang Godbole
2012	Best Judge Female	Urmila Matondkar

== Reception ==
Week	Year	TAM TVR	Rank		Ref.
Week	Year	TAM TVR	Mah/Goa	All India	Ref.
Week 6	2011	1.06	1	65	
Week 10	2011	0.7	3	87	
Week 13	2011	0.8	1	80	
