= Aamhi Saare Khavayye =

2007 Indian Marathi language cookery show

- Genre: Cookery
- Directed by: Mangesh Kharat
- Starring: See below
- Country of origin: India
- Original language: Marathi
- No. of episodes: 3748

Production
- Producer: Amit Aarekar
- Camera setup: Multi-camera
- Running time: 22-44 minutes
- Production company: The Ocean Entertainment

Original release
- Network: Zee Marathi
- Release: 1 May 2007 – present

Aamhi Saare Khavayye (transl. We are all foodies) is an Indian Marathi language cookery show aired on Zee Marathi. The show is hosted by Sankarshan Karhade and Prashant Damle. It premiered from 1 May 2007 by replacing Manasi Tumchya Ghari. The show completed 3000 episodes on 5 November 2018 and it is Zee Marathi's second longest-running Indian television show in the Marathi language.

== Cast ==
- Prashant Damle
- Sankarshan Karhade
- Devvrata Jategaonkar
- Mrunal Dusanis
- Rani Gunaji

== Awards ==
Zee Marathi Utsav Natyancha Awards
Year	Category	Recipient
2018	Best Anchor	Sankarshan Karhade
2022	Best Anchor	Sankarshan Karhade
2026	Best Non-fiction Show	

=== Special episode (1 hour) ===
1. 23 July 2018
2. 13 September 2018
3. 18 September 2018
4. 10 October 2018
5. 18 October 2018
