= Hapta Band =

Marathi language game show

- Presented by: Aadesh Bandekar; Nirmiti Sawant; Makarand Anaspure
- Country of origin: India
- Original language: Marathi
- No. of seasons: 2

Production
- Production locations: Mumbai, Maharashtra
- Camera setup: Multi-camera
- Running time: 45 or 60 minutes

Original release
- Network: Zee Marathi
- Release: 1 July 2009 – 1 November 2012

Hapta Band (transl. Installment closed) is an Indian Marathi language game show which aired on Zee Marathi. It was hosted by Aadesh Bandekar, Makarand Anaspure and Nirmiti Sawant. It premiered from 1 July 2009 and ended on 1 November 2012 airing two seasons.

== Seasons ==
Season	Originally Broadcast		Name
Season	First aired	Last aired	Name
1	1 July 2009	10 December 2009	Season 1
2	25 July 2012	1 November 2012	Jagna Suru

== Reception ==
=== Ratings ===
Week	Year	TAM TVR	Rank		Ref.
Week	Year	TAM TVR	Mah/Goa	All India	Ref.
Week 26	2009	0.72	4	91	
Week 28	2009	0.71	3	95	
Week 39	2009	0.8	1	96	

== Awards ==
Zee Marathi Utsav Natyancha Awards 2012
Category	Recipient
Best Anchor	Makarand Anaspure
