= Home Minister (TV series) =

Indian Marathi language game show

- Directed by: Nikhil Shigvan; Mahendra Kadam
- Presented by: Aadesh Bandekar; Nilesh Sable; Jitendra Joshi
- Country of origin: India
- Original language: Marathi
- No. of seasons: 6287

Production
- Producers: Nitin Keni; Akash Chawla
- Camera setup: Multi-camera
- Running time: 22 minutes
- Production company: Essel Vision Productions

Original release
- Network: Zee Marathi
- Release: 13 September 2004 – present

Related
- Maha Minister

Home Minister is an Indian Marathi reality game show which aired on Zee Marathi. It began airing on 13 September 2004. It is Zee Marathi's first longest-running Indian television show in Marathi language.

== Concept ==
The format of the show consists of the host Aadesh Bandekar, visiting the homes of women in different cities of Maharashtra and playing various games with them. He is affectionately called "Bhauji" which translates to Brother-in-law. The show also has a segment where Aadesh Bandekar chat with the women and their families. At the end of every episode, the winner of the games receives Paithani saree from him.

== Reception ==
=== Special episodes ===
1 hour

1. 15 June 2011
2. 19 February 2012
3. 20 October 2013
4. 22 March 2015
5. 19 July 2015
6. 30 August 2015
7. 22 October 2015
8. 21 August 2016
9. 25 September 2016
10. 17 September 2017
11. 26 November 2017
12. 2 September 2018
13. 15 August 2019
14. 13 September 2019
15. 27 October 2019
16. 7 February 2021
17. 15 January 2023
18. 13 September 2026
19. 21-26 September 2026
20. 11-30 October 2026

2 hours

1. 31 March 2014
2. 15 January 2017
3. 13 August 2017
4. 21 October 2018
5. 10 February 2019
6. 18 July 2021

== Production ==
Jitendra Joshi was replaced as the show's regular anchor in 2009 while Aadesh was contesting for the Maharashtra State Assembly election where he hosted the season Navvadhu No.1. In 2011, Nilesh Sable replaced Jitendra in 2011 and hosted the season Jaubai Jorat.

The series again premiered on 14 January 2011 replacing Sade Made Teen. The show stopped airing temporarily on 1 May 2010 with a total of 1616 episodes due to the Maharashtra State Election and it started again with new season.

=== Ratings ===
Week	Year	BARC Viewership		Ref.
Week	Year	TRP	Rank	Ref.
26 November 2017	1 Hour Special	3.1	5	

=== Adaptations ===
Language	Title	Original release	Network(s)	Last aired	Notes	Ref.
Tamil	Home Minister ஹோம் மினிஸ்டர்	17 December 2012	Zee Tamil	5 June 2015	Remake	

== Awards ==
Zee Marathi Utsav Natyancha Awards
Year	Category	Recipient
2005	Best Anchor Male	Aadesh Bandekar
2006	Best Anchor Male	Aadesh Bandekar
2006	Best Non-fiction Show	Essel Vision Productions
2007	Best Anchor Male	Aadesh Bandekar
2008	Best Anchor Male	Aadesh Bandekar
2009	Best Anchor Male	Aadesh Bandekar
2011	Best Anchor Male	Aadesh Bandekar
2011	Best Non-fiction Show	Essel Vision Productions
2012	Best Anchor Male	Aadesh Bandekar
2012	Best Non-fiction Show	Essel Vision Productions
2013	Best Anchor Male	Aadesh Bandekar
2014	Best Non-fiction Show	Essel Vision Productions
