= Sa Re Ga Ma Pa Marathi =

Indian Marathi language reality show

- Created by: Zee Marathi Creative Team
- Directed by: Rajan Dange
- Presented by: Pallavi Joshi, Mrunmayee Deshpande
- Judges: Avdhoot Gupte; Vaishali Samant
- Theme music composer: Ajay–Atul
- Opening theme: Written by: Shrirang Godbole; Performed by: Swapnil Bandodkar and Bela Shende
- Country of origin: India
- Original language: Marathi
- No. of seasons: 12

Production
- Executive producer: Nilesh Mayekar
- Production locations: Mumbai, Maharashtra
- Camera setup: Multi-camera
- Running time: 45–60 minutes

Original release
- Network: Zee Marathi
- Release: 18 September 2006 – present

Related
- Sa Re Ga Ma Pa Marathi Li'l Champs

Sa Re Ga Ma Pa Marathi is an Indian Marathi language singing reality show which is Marathi version of Hindi Sa Re Ga Ma Pa which aired on Zee Marathi. The show aired 12 seasons with 4 Sa Re Ga Ma Pa Marathi Li'l Champs seasons.

== Seasons ==
Season	Originally Broadcast		Name
Season	First aired	Last aired	Name
1	18 September 2006	26 January 2007	Season 1
2	5 February 2007	23 June 2007	Maharashtracha Ajinkyatara
3	2 July 2007	6 January 2008	Season 3
4	25 February 2008	29 June 2008	Swapna Swaranche, Navtarunyache
5	30 March 2009	12 July 2009	Maharashtracha Aajcha Aawaj
6	24 August 2009	31 January 2010	Maharashtracha Aajcha Aawaj 2
7	26 April 2010	1 August 2010	Surancha Mahasangram
8	13 June 2011	23 October 2011	Parva Navhe Garva
9	18 January 2012	6 May 2012	Swapna Swaranche, Sur Taryanche
10	13 January 2014	13 April 2014	Sur Navya Yugacha
11	13 November 2017	7 January 2018	Ghe Panga, Kar Danga
12	22 August 2026	Ongoing	Season 12

== Awards ==
Zee Marathi Utsav Natyancha Awards
Year	Category	Recipient
2007	Best Anchor Female	Pallavi Joshi
2007	Best Non-fiction show	Essel Vision Productions
2007	Best Judge	Devaki Pandit
2008	Best Anchor Female	Pallavi Joshi
2008	Best Non-fiction show	Essel Vision Productions
2011	Best Anchor Female	Priya Bapat
2011	Best Judge	Ajay–Atul
2014	Best Judge	Avadhoot Gupte
2026	Best Anchor	Mrunmayee Deshpande

== Reception ==
Week	Year	TAM TVR	Rank		Ref.
Week	Year	TAM TVR	Mah/Goa	All India	Ref.
Week 14	2009	1.0	1	62	
Week 15	2009	0.85	1	88	
Week 16	2009	0.9	2	75	
Week 17	2009	0.78	2	93	
Week 18	2009	0.9	1	71	
Week 19	2009	0.7	5	98	
Week 22	2009	0.76	5	93	
Week 26	2009	0.68	5	100	
12 July 2009	Grand Finale	0.78	1	81	
Week 1	2010	0.9	2	80	
31 January 2010	Grand Finale	1.1	1	46	
1 August 2010	Grand Finale	0.86	3	74	

== See also ==
- Sa Re Ga Ma Pa Bangla
- Sa Re Ga Ma Pa Hindi
- Sa Re Ga Ma Pa Kannada
- Sa Re Ga Ma Pa Keralam
- Sa Re Ga Ma Pa Tamil
- Sa Re Ga Ma Pa Telugu
