= Vedh Bhavishyacha =

2020 Indian Marathi language Astrological show

- Genre: Astrology
- Starring: Atulshashtri Bhagare
- Country of origin: India
- Original language: Marathi
- No. of seasons: 2
- No. of episodes: 2352

Production
- Camera setup: Multi-camera
- Running time: 22 minutes
- Production company: Zee Studios

Original release
- Network: Zee Marathi
- Release: 8 June 2020 – present

Vedh Bhavishyacha (transl. Predict the future) is an Indian Marathi language astrological television show which is running on Zee Marathi. Pandit Atulshastri Bhagare Guruji hosts this show. The show premiered its second season from 8 June 2020 airing daily. It is Zee Marathi's third longest running Indian television show in Marathi language.

== Plot ==
An astrology expert predicts the future of the 12 zodiac signs on the basis of the positions of the planets and the stars. He also narrates and interprets the stories from ancient Hindu texts.

== Awards ==
Zee Marathi Utsav Natyancha Awards 2013
Category	Recipient	Ref.
Best Anchor Male	Vijay Kelkar	
