= Zing Zing Zingat =

Marathi talk show

- Genre: Musical game show
- Starring: Aadesh Bandekar
- Country of origin: India
- Original language: Marathi
- No. of episodes: 59

Production
- Camera setup: Multi-camera
- Running time: 45 minutes

Original release
- Network: Zee Marathi
- Release: 28 November 2018 – 20 June 2019

Zing Zing Zingat is an Indian television musical game show in Marathi language originally aired on Zee Marathi. It was hosted by Aadesh Bandekar.

== Reception ==
=== Special episode (2 hours) ===
- 21 April 2019 (Zee Marathi family)

=== Ratings ===
Week	Year	BARC Viewership		Ref.
Week	Year	TRP	Rank	Ref.
Week 48	2018	4.0	5	
Week 5	2019	3.8	5	
Week 15	2019	2.7	5	
