= Pinjara (TV series) =

Marathi-language TV series

- Genre: Drama
- Starring: See below
- Country of origin: India
- Original language: Marathi
- No. of episodes: 504

Production
- Producers: Rakesh Sarang; Sangeeta Sarang
- Camera setup: Multi-camera
- Running time: 22 minutes
- Production company: Camps Club Production

Original release
- Network: Zee Marathi
- Release: 17 January 2011 – 25 August 2012

Pinjara (transl. Cage) is an Indian Marathi language television series which aired on Zee Marathi. It starred Bhushan Pradhan and Sanskruti Balgude in lead roles. It is produced by Sangita Sarang under the banner of Camps Club Production. It premiered from 17 January 2011 by replacing Amarprem.

== Cast ==
=== Main ===
- Bhushan Pradhan as Virendra (Veer) Waghmare
- Sanskruti Balgude as Anandi Waghmare

=== Recurring ===
- Girish Oak as Macchindra Shelar
- Sumukhi Pendse as Akka Shelar
- Sunil Tawde as Tatyarao Waghmare
- Sara Shravan as Narayani Shelar
- Pournima Manohar as Kumudini Waghmare
- Shubhangi Latkar as Tatya's wife
- Supriya Pathare as Anandi's mother
- Namrata Kadam
- Vijay Patwardhan
- Atul Todankar

== Awards ==
Zee Marathi Utsav Natyancha Awards 2011
Category	Recipient	Role
Best Actor	Bhushan Pradhan	Virendra
Best Father	Girish Oak	Macchindra
Best Negative Actress	Sumukhi Pendse	Akka
Best Negative Actor	Sunil Tawde	Tatya
Best Couple	Bhushan Pradhan-Sanskruti Balgude	Veer-Anandi
Best Supporting Female		Shalini
Best Series		
