= Majhi Tujhi Reshimgath =

2021 Indian Marathi language TV series

- Genre: Drama; Romance
- Written by: Sankarshan Karhade
- Directed by: Ajay Mayekar
- Starring: See below
- Country of origin: India
- Original language: Marathi
- No. of episodes: 458

Production
- Production locations: Mumbai, Maharashtra
- Camera setup: Multi-Camera
- Running time: 22 minutes
- Production company: Creative Minds Production

Original release
- Network: Zee Marathi
- Release: 23 August 2021 – 22 January 2023

Majhi Tujhi Reshimgath (transl. Mine & Your Silk Knot) is an Indian Marathi language television series which aired on Zee Marathi. It premiered from 23 August 2021 by replacing Aggabai Sunbai. It is directed by Ajay Mayekar and written by Sankarshan Karhade under the banner of Creative Minds Production. It starred Prarthana Behere, Myra Vaikul and Shreyas Talpade in lead roles.

== Synopsis ==
Neha Kamat, a single mother, lives in a chawl with her 5-year-old daughter, Pari, who suffers from diabetes and has to daily take an injection of insulin. Neha's ex-husband had abandoned her even before the birth of Pari and she takes care of her daughter single-handedly since then. During Neha's working hours, Pari is taken care of by their kind-hearted neighbours, Bandopant and Aruna Naik, who are also known as Bandu Kaka and Kaku, respectively, and are a senior citizen couple. Yashwardhan Chaudhari, who is also known as Yash, is a wealthy, orphaned businessman based in Dubai, United Arab Emirates, who arrives in India to manage his family business under the supervision of his elderly grandfather, Jagannath Chaudhari, who is also known as Aajoba.

During his visit to Mumbai, Yash meets Neha and falls in love at first sight with her. He learns that Neha is working in his own company and decides to not reveal his identity to her. Yash instructs his childhood friend, Sameer, to act as the employer in his company, while he himself acts as his assistant in front of everyone. During this pretense, Yash befriends Neha in the office and finds out about her struggle with a middle-class life. Thus, Yash comes to Neha's aid every time and also befriends Pari in the process, while Neha is forced by her estranged brother's wife, Meenakshi, to get remarried with a fraud lawyer, Advocate Rajan Paranjape.

== Cast ==
=== Main ===
- Shreyas Talpade as Yashwardhan Chaudhari
- Prarthana Behere as Neha Kamat / Neha Yashwardhan Chaudhari / Anushka Mehta
- Myra Vaikul as Pari Kamat / Pari Yashwardhan Chaudhari

=== Recurring ===
Chaudhari family

- Mohan Joshi / Pradeep Welankar as Jagannath "Jaggu" Chaudhari
- Atul Mahajan as Satyajeet Jagannath Chaudhari
- Sheetal Kshirsagar as Seema "Simmi" Satyajeet Chaudhari
- Ved Ambre as Pushkaraj "Pikuchu" Satyajeet Chaudhari
- Anand Kale as Vishwajeet Jagannath Chaudhari
- Swati Pansare as Mithila Vishwajeet Chaudhari

Others

- Sankarshan Karhade as Sameer
- Kajal Kate as Shefali
- Nikhil Rajeshirke as Avinash Nayak
- Swati Deval as Meenakshi Kamat
- Manasi Magikar as Aruna Naik
- Ajit Kelkar as Bandopant "Bandu Kaka" Naik
- Gauri Kendre as Mohini
- Chaitanya Chandratre as Rajan Paranjape
- Sanika Banaraswale-Joshi as Charulata
- Jane Kataria as Jessica
- Dinesh Kanade as Mr. Ghartonde
- Varsha Ghatpande as Anuradha Karnik
- Charuta Supekar as Preeti
- Krishna Mahadik as Ojas
- Pranali Ovhal as Guddi
- Nupur Daithankar as Revati Desai
- Madhav Abhyankar as Jayantibhai Mehta
- Sandhya Mhatre as Mrs. Mehta
- Vinayak Bhave as Ritesh Mehta
- Geetanjali Ganage as Kinjal Ritesh Mehta
- Yogini Pophale as Sujata

== Awards ==
Zee Marathi Utsav Natyancha Awards
Year	Category	Recipient	Role	Ref.
2021	Best Friends	Shreyas Talpade-Sankarshan Karhade	Yash-Sameer	
2021	Best Grandfather	Mohan Joshi	Jagannath Chaudhari	
2021	Best Child Character	Myra Vaikul	Pari Nayak	
2021	Best Comedy Female	Kajal Kate	Shefali	
2021	Best Comedy Male	Sankarshan Karhade	Sameer	
2021	Best Character Male	Sankarshan Karhade	Sameer	
2021	Best Character Female	Manasi Magikar	Aruna Naik	
2021	Best Mother	Prarthana Behere	Neha Kamat	
2021	Best Actress	Prarthana Behere	Neha Kamat	
2021	Best Actor	Shreyas Talpade	Yashwardhan Chaudhari	
2021	Best Series	Ajay Mayekar	Director	
2021	Best Title Song	Ajay Mayekar	Director	
2022	Best Friends	Shreyas Talpade-Sankarshan Karhade	Yash-Sameer	
2022	Best Grandmother	Manasi Magikar	Aruna Naik	
2022	Best Grandfather	Pradeep Welankar	Jagannath Chaudhari	
2022	Best Father-in-law	Pradeep Welankar	Jagannath Chaudhari	
2022	Best Child Character	Myra Vaikul	Pari Chaudhari	
2022	Best Comedy Female	Kajal Kate	Shefali	
2022	Best Comedy Male	Sankarshan Karhade	Sameer	
2022	Best Character Male	Sankarshan Karhade	Sameer	
2022	Best Mother	Prarthana Behere	Neha Chaudhari	
2022	Best Daughter-in-law	Prarthana Behere	Neha Chaudhari	
2022	Best Couple	Shreyas Talpade-Prarthana Behere	Yash-Neha	
2022	Best Title Song	Ajay Mayekar	Director	
2022	Best Family		Chaudhari Family	
2022	Best Supporting Male	Anand Kale	Vishwajeet Chaudhari	
2022	Best Negative Actress	Sheetal Kshirsagar	Seema (Simmi) Chaudhari	
2022	Best Mother-in-law	Swati Pansare	Mithila Chaudhari	

== Reception ==
=== Special episodes ===
1 hour

- 31 October 2021
- 6 February 2022
- 20 March 2022
- 24 July 2022
- 14 August 2022
- 13 November 2022
- 15 January 2023
- 22 January 2023

2 hours

- 12 June 2022 (Yash-Neha's marriage)

=== Seasons ===
- 22 October 2022 (1 year later)

=== Airing history ===
No.	Airing Date	Days	Time (IST)	Ref.
1	23 August 2021 – 18 September 2022	Mon-Sat (sometimes Sun)	8:30 pm	
2	19 September 2022 – 22 January 2023	Mon-Sat (sometimes Sun)	6:30 pm	

== Adaptations ==
Language	Title	Original release	Network(s)	Last aired	Notes
Marathi	Majhi Tujhi Reshimgath माझी तुझी रेशीमगाठ	23 August 2021	Zee Marathi	22 January 2023	Original
Kannada	Seetha Raama ಸೀತಾ ರಾಮ	17 July 2023	Zee Kannada	30 May 2025	Remake
Odia	Shree ଶ୍ରୀ	22 January 2024	Zee Sarthak	1 June 2024	Remake
Hindi	Main Hoon Saath Tere मैं हूँ साथ तेरे	29 April 2024	Zee TV	18 August 2024	Remake
Bengali	Ke Prothom Kachhe Esechhi কে প্রথম কাছে এসেছি	27 May 2024	Zee Bangla	22 September 2024	Remake
