= Julun Yeti Reshimgathi =

2013 Indian Marathi language TV series

- Genre: Indian soap opera Drama; Romance
- Story by: Vivek Apte
- Directed by: Hemant Deodhar
- Starring: See below
- Country of origin: India
- Original language: Marathi
- No. of episodes: 582

Production
- Camera setup: Multi-camera
- Running time: 22 minutes
- Production company: Essel Vision Productions

Original release
- Network: Zee Marathi
- Release: 25 November 2013 – 26 September 2015

Julun Yeti Reshimgathi (transl. Silk Knots are woven) is an Indian Marathi language TV series which aired on Zee Marathi. It premiered from 25 November 2013 by replacing Mala Sasu Havi. It starred Lalit Prabhakar and Prajakta Mali in lead roles.

== Summary ==
It is a love story about Aditya and Meghana, specifically, their struggles, understanding, maturity and most notably, their friendship. It is also about how they became inseparable and faced obstacles together, and how they were in love and willing to die for each other. They reached this point after a difficult struggle. Meghana's sincerity and honesty, and Aditya's understanding and love for his wife, characterized their relationship. Their initial awkwardness and aloofness turned into friendship and Meghana's realization of true love for Aditya started a lifelong relationship.

== Plot ==
Aditya Desai is a chartered accountant who lives with his family. Meghana and Aditya Nagarkar are in a relationship that is not accepted by her father, Suresh Kudalkar, who wants a settled man for his daughter and prevents Meghana from contacting Aditya Nagarkar. Meghana's aunt identifies Aditya Desai as a potential match for Meghana and arranges a meeting between the families. Aditya Desai expresses interest in Meghana, and their marriage is arranged. Unable to reach Aditya Nagarkar, Meghana marries Aditya Desai.

On the first wedding night, Meghana tells everything about her boyfriend and love affair to Aditya Desai. He takes the decision to allow her freedom to choose between him and her boyfriend. As time passes, Meghana finds herself becoming a part of the Desai family and unknowingly falls in love with Aditya. She confesses her love for him and everyone in the family notices the change in their dynamic. Later they consummate their marriage.

One day, Archana accidentally opens a box in Aditya Meghana's bedroom consisting photos of Aditya Nagarkar and Meghana together. She tells about this to Desai family. Everyone gets shock of their life. They get angry with Meghana and Aditya for not telling this to them. Gradually and patiently, Meghana proves her love for Aditya Desai and the devotion to the family. One day, Aditya Desai accidentally finds Aditya Nagarkar in a critical condition. Having been friends, he can't find in himself to leave him in such a critical state. He admits him in a hospital and tells this to Meghana and the family. Later Desai family also proudly supports this gentle and compassionate gesture of Aditya. Suresh Kudalkar couldn't digest it and bashes Meghana for this. With her family's support, Meghana brings the episode to a conclusion while expressing her disappointment over her parents' behavior.

Upset with Meghana's lack of response to his apologies, Sureshrao impulsively walks away from home to seek solace in some godman's advice leaving Madhavi - his wife - worried sick. When the Desai family hears this, they silently condemn this gesture but Archana vehemently opposes this behavior. She challenges this behavior and these questions make Madhavi reconsider her marriage with Suresh. However, it upsets Meghana that her parents may get separated. However, Maai asks her to look at the whole matter as a woman and not as a daughter. After an upsetting and selfish call from her father makes her see light, she decides to support her mother. When Sureshrao discovers this, he doesn't take it seriously, he starts to realize the seriousness of the situation and the error of his ways. He decides to make amends and change his attitude. With time, Madhavi sees the change in him and decides to return home and start anew. This changed dynamic also happens to boost Madhavi's morale and makes Suresh realize that his wife is actually quite smart and intelligent.

Around the same time, Chitra, Archana's sister-in-law, enters the family. She immediately gels with Meghana and Aditya. She confides in them her love for a guy named Manoj Vengurlekar who is smart and intelligent but also arrogant and short-tempered. Her love story with creates some clash between Aditya and Meghana due to different points of view. Eventually, she marries Manoj but still faces challenges in her marriage because of her idealizing Aditya and Meghana and constantly comparing her marriage with theirs. Not to mention Manoj's radical and short-tempered nature. However, after a short stay with the Desai family, they both realize their mistakes and see how joyful love can be. They decide to give their marriage another chance and return to their home town.

Around the same time, Suresh proposes the redevelopment of Desaiwadi. While Amit exuberantly supports this notion, Aditya doesn't find in himself supporting it. Especially when he sees how upset Maai is with this. Nana seems to be resigned to the situation. Aditya finally decides to confront Nana and explain to him how he has completely ignored Maai's pleas to not agree for the redevelopment. After understanding his mistake, Nana apologizes to Maai. Later Aditya also explains to Amit about the mistake that they would be making if they proceeded with the redevelopment. Amit agrees. This however puts a wrench in Amit's business plans.

Meghana completes her M.A. Final Year and takes a job as a lecturer. She befriends Anjali at the Training Center in Nagpur. Anjali's husband had died in a road accident and the matter was in court. She has been balancing looking after a kid, a new job, and the court case to give justice to her husband by winning case against some rich spate. Unbeknownst to Meghana, Aditya Nagarkar was a friend of Anjali's husband and he was helping her in this court matter. Due to her accommodation problem in Mumbai, Anjali comes and stays in by renting a room in Desaiwadi. Aditya Nagarkar lands there unknowingly. Another complex situation for Desai family but Aditya Desai and Nana, by their sensible handling, settle the matter and make Aditya Nagarkar and Anjali understand that it's time to move on. With this moral boost, Aditya Nagarkar and Anjali decide to tie a knot. This brings an end to the love triangle.

During the same time, Meghana receives a transfer to Pune which she accepts. Nana and Maai support this transfer because they feel having been the youngest, they haven't really understood the work that goes in managing a house and they should try living on their own. This upsets Vijaya. Also with a newly established supermarket business, Archana and Vijaya both become too busy to manage the home. Maai also cannot help because of her growing arthritis problems. Everyone notices that Vijaya is upset with Meghana, but can't do anything about it and another transfer back to Mumbai, brings Meghana home and makes Vijaya realize her folly.

The show ends on happy note with Aditya and Meghana taking decision to adopt a girl child and Desai family along with Kudalkars accepting their decision warmly.

== Cast ==
=== Main ===
- Lalit Prabhakar as Aditya Nana Desai
- Prajakta Mali as Meghana Suresh Kudalkar / Meghana Aditya Desai

=== Recurring ===
Desai family

- Girish Oak as Nana Desai
- Sukanya Kulkarni as Sanjivani Nana Desai (Maai)
- Lokesh Gupte as Amit Nana Desai
- Madhugandha Kulkarni as Vijaya Amit Desai
- Sahil Kokate as Pallav Amit Desai
- Durva Sawant as Sakshi Amit Desai

Dusane family

- Sharmishtha Raut as Archana Nana Desai / Archana Satish Dusane
- Vighnesh Joshi as Satish Dusane
- Riya as Sawari Satish Dusane
- Aarya as Mayuri Satish Dusane

Kudalkar family

- Uday Tikekar as Suresh Kudalkar
- Megha Bhagwat as Madhavi Suresh Kudalkar
- Mrunal Chemburkar as Meena

Others

- Kaustubh Diwan as Aditya Nagarkar
- Prafulla Samant as Bhaskar Sardesai
- Yogini Chouk as Vaishali Sardesai
- Anil Gawas as Prakash Rane
- Rupali Mangale as Anita Prakash Rane
- Sayali Deodhar as Chitra Manoj Vengurlekar.
- Sudeep Modak as Manoj Vengurlekar

== Production ==
The show became popular amongst the family audiences. The show had become No.1 Marathi show in June 2014, at the time when Meghana confesses her love for Aditya Desai. The lead actor Lalit Prabhakar won best actor award at Zee Marathi Utsav Natyancha Awards 2014. The show won total 8 awards in various categories at this award function. This series established Uday Tikekar (in the role of Suresh Kudalkar) as a cult figure with his "Jai Ho" and his "Babaji, Laksha Asu Dya" dialogues and his peculiar physical gestures became immensely popular. The series also brought out the myriad facets of a middle class joint family and the inherent support system for the members whenever there is a crisis in their lives.

=== Dubbed version ===
Language	Title	Original release	Network(s)	Last aired
Hindi	Mohe Piya Milenge मोहे पिया मिलेंगे	4 May 2015	Zee TV	5 June 2015

== Awards ==
Zee Marathi Utsav Natyancha Awards 2014
Category	Recipient	Role
Best Family		Desai Family
Best Actor	Lalit Prabhakar	Aditya
Best Mother	Sukanya Kulkarni	Maai
Best Mother-in-law	Sukanya Kulkarni	Maai
Best Father	Girish Oak	Nana
Best Father-in-law	Girish Oak	Nana
Best Siblings	Lalit Prabhakar-Sharmishtha Raut-Lokesh Gupte	Aditya-Archana-Amit
Best Comedy Character	Uday Tikekar	Suresh Kudalkar
