= Lakshmi Niwas (Marathi TV series) =

2024 Indian Marathi language TV series

- Genre: Drama
- Based on: Lakshmi Nivasa
- Developed by: Mahesh Rao
- Directed by: Amit Savardekar; Nitin Katkar
- Starring: See below
- Country of origin: India
- Original language: Marathi
- No. of episodes: 650

Production
- Producer: Sunil Bhosale
- Production locations: Saswad, Maharashtra
- Camera setup: Multi-camera
- Running time: 22–44 minutes
- Production company: Creative Minds Production

Original release
- Network: Zee Marathi
- Release: 23 December 2024 – present

Lakshmi Niwas (transl. Lakshmi's Residence) is an Indian Marathi language television series which airing on Zee Marathi. It stars Tushar Dalvi and Harshada Khanvilkar in lead roles. It is produced by Sunil Bhosale under the banner of Someel Creations. The series premiered from 23 December 2024 by replacing Satvya Mulichi Satavi Mulgi. It is an official remake of Zee Kannada's TV series Lakshmi Nivasa.

== Plot ==
Lakshmi, a strong-willed woman who willingly forfeits a life of wealth to marry Shriniwas Dalvi for love. Anchored within a middle-class, traditional joint family, the resilient couple dedicates their lives to a singular, unyielding dream: building an independent house of their own, titled "Lakshmi Niwas." As they navigate financial hurdles, domestic sacrifices, and family disputes, their endurance is put to the test through the turbulent marriages of their daughters. Their elder daughter, Bhavana, must constantly defend her integrity and marital rights against the orthodox pride of her elite rural in-laws, the Gade-Patils. Meanwhile, their younger daughter, Janhavi, silently suffers the toxic, manipulative abuse of her husband Jayant. Relying on her strong moral compass, Lakshmi serves as the protective shield of her family, striving to rescue her daughters from domestic exploitation while steadfastly pursuing her husband's dream of a home.

== Cast ==
=== Main ===
- Tushar Dalvi as Shriniwas Dalvi
- Harshada Khanvilkar as Lakshmi Pratap Deshmukh / Lakshmi Shriniwas Dalvi
- Kunal Shukla as Siddhiraj Sampat Gade-Patil
- Akshaya Deodhar as Bhavana Shriniwas Dalvi / Bhavana Siddhiraj Gade-Patil

=== Recurring ===
Kanitkar family

- Meghan Jadhav as Jayant Kanitkar
  - Prib Surywanshi as child Jayant
- Divya Pugaonkar as Janhavi Shriniwas Dalvi / Janhavi Jayant Kanitkar / Janhavi Vishwa Deshmukh (Tanuja)
- Sayali Parab as Jayant's mother
- Shivraj Walvekar as Grandfather

Dalvi family

- Swati Deval as Mangala Shriniwas Dalvi
- Nikhil Rajeshirke as Santosh Shriniwas Dalvi
- Meenakshi Rathod as Veena Santosh Dalvi
- Sarthak Thakur as Varad Santosh Dalvi
  - Pratik Patil as elder Varad
- Anuj Thakare as Harish Shriniwas Dalvi
- Tanvi Kolte / Dhanashree Patil as Sinchana Sampat Gade-Patil / Sinchana Harish Dalvi
- Mahesh Phalke as Vyankatesh Shriniwas Dalvi (Arjun / Venky)
- Payal Pande / Shruti Patil as Aarti Vyankatesh Dalvi
- Vinita Shinde as Shanta Dalvi

Gade-Patil family

- Rajdev Jamdade as Sampat Sarjerao Gade-Patil
- Rajashri Nikam as Shaila Sampat Gade-Patil
- Tarita Sanap as Rama Siddhiraj Gade-Patil
- Pallavi Vaidya as Renuka Sampat Gade-Patil
- Anand Prabhu as Adhiraj Sampat Gade-Patil
- Kalyani Jadhav as Nilambari Adhiraj Gade-Patil
- Veena Katti as Sulakshana Sarjerao Gade-Patil

Inamdar family

- Rajesh Shringarpure as Shrikant Inamdar
- Radhika Vidyasagar as Vanaja Inamdar
- Ananya Tambe as Anandi Shrikant Inamdar / Anandi Siddhiraj Gade-Patil
  - Shubhavi Gupte as elder Anandi

Mujumdar family

- Dushyant Wagh as Ravi Mujumdar
- Supriti Shivalkar as Suparna Ravi Mujumdar
- Kasturi Sarang as Saroj Mujumdar

Deshmukh family

- Jagannath Nivangune as Digvijay Pratap Deshmukh
- Shraddha Satam as Lalita Digvijay Deshmukh
- Anuj Prabhu as Vishwa Digvijay Deshmukh
- Prafulla Samant as Pratap Deshmukh
- Akshay Bhosale as Aarav Vishwa Deshmukh

Bhalerao family

- Satish Salagare as Gunaji Bhalerao
- Janhavi Tambat as Poorvi Gunaji Bhalerao
- Sayali Sambhare as Vasundhara Gunaji Bhalerao

=== Others ===
- Amruta Deshmukh as Sai
- Mugdha Puranik as Dolly
- Mrunmayee Gondhalekar as Ishita
- Amey Barve as Madhav Gulgule
- Chandanraj Jamdade as Pravin Khedkar
- Prasad Rajendra as Suresh
- Rushikesh Mohite as Mahesh
- Sunil Kadam as Ramesh
- Omkar Teli as Manya
- Sumit Chaudhari as Gaurav
- Chaitanya Chandratre as Nikhil
- Aarohi Gawade as Sanvi / Sadhvi
- Sudhir Gadgil as Chitragupta
- Varsha Samant as Malati
- Saurabh Gujale as Chotu
- Dhananjay Jamdar as Soham
- Tejas Pingulkar as Manohar
- Leena Pandit as Ratna
- Sandeep Shingdane as Devendra Patki

=== Cameo appearances ===
- Renuka Shahane as Uma Bhalerao
- Siddharth Menon as Madhav Mestri
- Nirmiti Sawant as Padmavati Ghorpade
- Madhugandha Kulkarni as Kalindi Dharmadhikari
- Tejashri Pradhan as Swanandi Sarpotdar
- Lalit Prabhakar as Rohit
- Prarthana Behere as Anjali Ghorpade
- Raj Hanchnale as Jay Khanolkar
- Prasad Jawade as Deep Gaikwad
- Meghana Erande as Pramila Parab

== Awards ==
Zee Marathi Utsav Natyancha Awards
Awards	Category	Recipient	Role	Ref.
2025	Best Daughter-in-law	Meenakshi Rathod	Veena Dalvi	
2025	Best Mother-in-law	Harshada Khanvilkar	Lakshmi Dalvi	
2025	Best Father-in-law	Tushar Dalvi	Shriniwas Dalvi	
2025	Best Friends	Harshada Khanvilkar-Kunal Shukla	Lakshmi-Siddhu	
2025	Best Couple	Kunal Shukla-Akshaya Deodhar	Siddhu-Bhavana	
2025	Popular Couple	Meghan Jadhav-Divya Pugaonkar	Jayant-Janhavi	
2025	Best Actor	Kunal Shukla	Siddhiraj Gade-Patil	
2025	Best Son-in-law	Kunal Shukla	Siddhiraj Gade-Patil	
2025	Best Siblings	Mahesh Phalke-Akshaya Deodhar-Divya Pugaonkar	Venky-Bhavana-Janhavi	
2025	Best Supporting Actor	Anuj Prabhu	Vishwa Deshmukh	
2025	Best Supporting Actress	Pallavi Vaidya	Renuka Gade-Patil	
2025	Best Child Actor	Ananya Tambe	Anandi Gade-Patil	
2025	ZEE5 Popular Character Male	Meghan Jadhav	Jayant Kanitkar	
2025	ZEE5 Popular Character Female	Akshaya Deodhar	Bhavana Gade-Patil	
2025	Popular Family		Dalvi Family	
2025	Popular Series	Sunil Bhosale	Producer	
Ugach	Best Radubai	Harshada Khanvilkar	Lakshmi Dalvi	
Ugach	Best Zolar	Nikhil Rajeshirke	Santosh Dalvi	
Ugach	Best Dhishum Dhishum	Kunal Shukla	Siddhiraj Gade-Patil	
Ugach	Best Lagna Vighna			
2026	Best Father	Kunal Shukla	Siddhiraj Gade-Patil	
2026	Best Mother	Akshaya Deodhar	Bhavana Gade-Patil	

== Adaptations ==
Language	Title	Original release	Network(s)	Last aired	Notes	Ref.
Kannada	Lakshmi Nivasa ಲಕ್ಷ್ಮೀ ನಿವಾಸ	16 January 2024	Zee Kannada	Ongoing	Original	
Malayalam	Manathe Kottaram മാനത്തെ കൊട്ടാരം	12 August 2024	Zee Keralam	3 May 2026	Remake	
Marathi	Lakshmi Niwas लक्ष्मी निवास	23 December 2024	Zee Marathi	Ongoing	Remake	
Tamil	Gettimelam கெட்டிமேளம்	20 January 2025	Zee Tamil	28 June 2026	Remake	
Telugu	Lakshmi Nivasam లక్ష్మీ నివాసం	3 March 2025	Zee Telugu	Ongoing	Remake	
Hindi	Lakshmi Niwas लक्ष्मी निवास	12 January 2026	Zee TV	Ongoing	Remake	
Bengali	Kamala Nibas কমলা নিবাস	13 April 2026	Zee Bangla	Ongoing	Remake	

== Reception ==
=== Mahasangam ===
Date	Series	Ref.
26 January-1 February 2025	Paaru	
27 July-2 August 2025	Paaru	
11-17 January 2026	Kamli	

=== Airing history ===
No.	Airing Date	Days	Time (IST)	Ref.
1	23 December 2024 – 15 March 2026	Daily	8-9 pm	
2	16 March – 11 April 2026	Daily	8 pm	
3	13 April 2026 – Ongoing	Daily	1.30-2.30 pm	
4	14 – 25 September 2026	Daily	2-3 pm	

=== Ratings ===
Week	Year	BARC TVR	Rank		Ref.
Week	Year	BARC TVR	ZM	Mah/Goa	Ref.
Week 27	2025	3.7	2	8	
Week 29	2025	3.6	2	9	
Week 31	2025	3.4	2	10	
Week 32	2025	3.3	1	9	
Week 33	2025	3.2	2	10	
Week 39	2025	3.1	2	8	
Week 40	2025	3.5	2	9	
Week 41	2025	3.5	2	9	
Week 42	2025	3.0	2	8	
Week 43	2025	3.4	2	8	
Week 44	2025	3.6	2	7	
Week 45	2025	3.8	3	6	
Week 47	2025	3.4	3	9	
Week 48	2025	3.5	3	8	
Week 49	2025	3.5	3	8	
Week 50	2025	3.4	4	8	
Week 51	2025	3.7	3	6	
Week 52	2025	3.6	3	6	
Week 3	2026	3.3	4	7	
Week 4	2026	3.3	3	6	
Week 5	2026	3.4	4	5	
Week 7	2026	3.3	4	7	
Week 9	2026	2.3	2	6	
Week 11	2026	2.7	4	6	
