= Eka Peksha Ek =

Marathi dance reality show

- Created by: Zee Marathi Creative Team
- Presented by: Aadesh Bandekar; Pushkar Shrotri
- Judges: Sachin Pilgaonkar
- Country of origin: India
- Original language: Marathi
- No. of seasons: 7

Production
- Producer: Sachin Pilgaonkar
- Production locations: Mumbai, Maharashtra, India
- Camera setup: Multi-camera
- Running time: 45-60 minutes

Original release
- Network: Zee Marathi
- Release: 26 December 2007 – 13 October 2013

Eka Peksha Ek (transl. One Over One) is an Indian Marathi language TV dance reality show which aired on Zee Marathi. It was hosted by Aadesh Bandekar and Pushkar Shrotri. Sachin Pilgaonkar was the producer and Mahaguru (main judge) of this show. It aired from 26 December 2007 and stopped on 13 October 2013 with seven seasons.

== Seasons ==
Season	Originally Broadcast		Days	Name	Winners
Season	First aired	Last aired	Days	Name	Winners
1	26 December 2007	2008	Wed-Thu	10 pm	Cedric D'Souza, Sukanya Kalan
2	2008	2008	Wed-Thu	10 pm	Bhargavi Chirmule
3	15 October 2008	26 April 2009	Wed-Thu	Dance Masti	
4	30 October 2009	30 January 2010	Fri-Sat	Chhote Champions	
4	1 February 2010	4 April 2010	Mon-Tue	Chhote Champions	
5	29 December 2010	1 May 2011	Wed-Thu	Apsara Aali	Mrunmayee Deshpande
6	12 October 2011	15 January 2012	Wed-Thu	Jodicha Mamla	Sakshi Tisgaonkar, Saurabh Bahadure
7	1 July 2013	13 October 2013	Mon-Tue	Apsara Aali 2	Deepti Ketkar

== Awards ==
Zee Marathi Utsav Natyancha Awards
Year	Category	Recipient
2008	Best Judge	Sachin Pilgaonkar
2008	Best Event	Grand Finale
2012	Best Judge	Sachin Pilgaonkar

== Reception ==
Week	Year	TAM TVR	Rank		Ref.
Week	Year	TAM TVR	Mah/Goa	All India	Ref.
Week 45	2008	0.92	2	79	
Week 47	2008	0.94	2	50	
Week 50	2008	0.9	4	86	
Week 1	2009	0.8	4	96	
Week 3	2009	1.11	2	55	
Week 5	2009	0.9	3	81	
Week 6	2009	0.9	2	78	
Week 14	2009	0.8	3	88	
Week 15	2009	0.93	1	67	
26 April 2009	Grand Finale	1.0	1	69	
Week 50	2009	0.7	5	100	
Week 52	2009	0.8	4	89	
Week 5	2010	0.8	2	75	
Week 6	2011	1.04	2	66	
Week 10	2011	0.77	1	79	
Week 13	2011	0.79	2	81	
