= Yeu Kashi Tashi Me Nandayla =

2021 Indian Marathi-language TV series

- Genre: Soap opera Drama; Romance
- Screenplay by: Sukhada Ayare; Dialogues; Pallavi Karkera; Kiran Kulkarni
- Directed by: Ajay Mayekar; Harish Shirke
- Starring: See below
- Theme music composer: Ashok Patki
- Opening theme: "Yeu Kashi Tashi Me Nandayla" by Madhura Datar & Amruta Dahivelkar
- Country of origin: India
- Original language: Marathi
- No. of episodes: 378

Production
- Producer: Tejendra Neswankar
- Cinematography: Sachin Rajvilkar
- Camera setup: Multi-camera
- Running time: 22 minutes
- Production company: Trrump Carrd Production

Original release
- Network: Zee Marathi
- Release: 4 January 2021 – 19 March 2022

Yeu Kashi Tashi Me Nandayla (transl. How should I come to your house?) is an Indian Marathi language television series which aired on Zee Marathi. It starred Anvita Phaltankar and Shalva Kinjavadekar, with Shubhangi Gokhale, Nikhil Raut, Aditi Sarangdhar in supporting roles. It premiered from 4 January 2021 by replacing Tujhyat Jeev Rangala. It is produced by Tejendra Neswankar under the banner of Trrump Carrd Production.

== Synopsis ==
The story revolves around a middle-class girl, Avani (Sweetu), who gets hired for a job in Mumbai. Her mother Nalu asks her to stay with her mother's childhood friend, Shaku, to reduce the time needed to reach her new workplace. During their visit, Sweetu is introduced to Shaku's son Omkar. The plot then focuses on the love story between Sweetu and Omkar, and their conflict with Omkar's elder sister Malvika, who despises Sweetu and her mother due to their poor financial status.

== Cast ==
=== Main ===
- Anvita Phaltankar as Avani Vasant Salvi / Avani Omkar Khanvilkar (Sweetu); Omkar's wife
- Shalva Kinjawadekar as Onkar Khanvilkar (Om); Sweetu's husband

=== Recurring ===
Omkar's family

- Shubhangi Gokhale / Kishori Ambiye as Shakuntala Khanvilkar (Shaku); Omkar's mother
- Aditi Sarangdhar as Malvika Khanvilkar (Tayde); Omkar's sister
- Milind Joshi as Mr. Khanvilkar; Omkar's father
- Triyug Mantri as Rocky; Malvika's boyfriend

Sweetu's family

- Dipti Samel-Ketkar as Nalini Vasant Salvi (Nalu); Sweetu's mother
- Uday Salvi as Vasant Salvi (Dada); Sweetu's father
- Umesh Bane as Sharad Salvi; Sweetu's uncle
- Shubhangi Bhujbal as Suman Sharad Salvi; Sweetu's aunt
- Arnav Raje as Chinmay Sharad Salvi (Chinya); Sweetu's cousin

Others

- Nikhil Raut as Mohit Parab
- Priya Marathe as Maithili
- Meera Jagannath as Monika Rao (Momo)
- Manmeet Pem as Abhishek (Gattu)
- Komal Dhande as Mohit's mother
- Sagar Sakpal as Customer
- Nishant Pathare as Sushil
- Varsha Padwal as Mamta
- Prajakta Amburle as Malvika's friend
- Mayuresh Khole as Nishant
- Suvedha Desai as Kinjal

== Production ==
=== Development ===
The show is produced by Trrump Carrd Production. The show is written by Kiran Kulkarni.

=== Filming ===
The series is primarily filmed in Mumbai and Thane. On 13 April 2021, Chief Minister of Maharashtra Uddhav Thackeray announced a sudden curfew due to increased COVID-19 cases and production was suspended on 14 April 2021. The production location was temporarily moved to Daman. In early June 2021, the Government of Maharashtra allowed shooting within the state given certain restrictions. The cast and crew returned to Mumbai on 20 June 2021 and resumed filming.

== Awards ==
Zee Marathi Utsav Natyancha Awards
Year	Category	Recipient	Role	Ref.
Zee Marathi Utsav Natyancha Awards 2020-21	Best Actor	Shalva Kinjavadekar	Omkar	
Zee Marathi Utsav Natyancha Awards 2020-21	Best Negative Actress	Aditi Sarangdhar	Malvika	
Zee Marathi Utsav Natyancha Awards 2020-21	Best Mother	Shubhangi Gokhale	Shaku	
Zee Marathi Utsav Natyancha Awards 2020-21	Best Father	Uday Salvi	Vasant (Dada)	
Zee Marathi Utsav Natyancha Awards 2020-21	Best Supporting Female	Shubhangi Bhujbal	Suman Kaki	
Zee Marathi Utsav Natyancha Awards 2021	Best Siblings	Anvita Phaltankar-Arnav Raje	Sweetu-Chinya	
Zee Marathi Utsav Natyancha Awards 2021	Best Negative Actress	Aditi Sarangdhar	Malvika	
Zee Marathi Utsav Natyancha Awards 2021	Best Mother-in-law	Shubhangi Gokhale	Shaku	
Zee Marathi Utsav Natyancha Awards 2021	Best Father-in-law	Uday Salvi	Vasant (Dada)	
Zee Marathi Utsav Natyancha Awards 2021	Best Daughter-in-law	Anvita Phaltankar	Sweetu	

== Reception ==
=== Ratings ===
Week	Year	BARC Viewership		Ref.
Week	Year	TRP	Rank	Ref.
Week 16	2021	3.3	5	
Week 17	2021	3.0	5	

=== Seasons ===
- 8 December 2021 (6 months later)

=== Special episode ===
==== 1 hour ====
- 21 February 2021
- 19 December 2021

==== 2 hours ====
- 16 May 2021 (Tu, Me Aani Puranpoli)
- 22 August 2021 (Sweetu and Mohit's marriage)
