= Ya Sukhano Ya =

Marathi language TV series

- Genre: Drama
- Written by: Shilpa Navalkar
- Directed by: Virendra Pradhan
- Starring: See below
- Theme music composer: "Ya Sukhanno Ya" by Sadhana Sargam
- Composer: Mangesh Kulkarni
- Country of origin: India
- Original language: Marathi
- No. of episodes: 855

Production
- Producer: Smita Thackeray
- Production locations: Mumbai, Maharashtra
- Camera setup: Multi-camera
- Running time: 22 minutes
- Production company: Rahul Production

Original release
- Network: Zee Marathi
- Release: 14 November 2005 – 14 November 2008

Ya Sukhano Ya (transl. Come, my pleasures) is an Indian Marathi language television series which aired on Zee Marathi. It starred Vikram Gokhale and Aishwarya Narkar in lead roles. It is produced by Smita Thackeray and directed by Virendra Pradhan under the banner of Rahul Production. It premiered from 14 November 2005 by replacing Tuzyavina. It ended on 14 November 2008 completing 855 episodes.

== Cast ==
=== Main ===
- Vikram Gokhale as Avinash Adhikari (Dada)
- Aishwarya Narkar as Sarita Abhay Adhikari

=== Recurring ===
Adhikari family

- Rajan Bhise as Abhay Adhikari
- Sampada Kulkarni / Prajakta Dighe as Deepika Ankush Vaidya
- Girish Pardeshi as Mayuresh Adhikari
- Sharvari Lohokare as Kasturi Mayuresh Adhikari
- Priya Marathe as Pavani Dada Adhikari / Pavani Aryan Datar
- Shraddha Ranade as Sameera Abhay Adhikari
- Mrunmayee Phadke as Swanandi Abhay Adhikari

Others

- Prasanna Ketkar as Ankush Vaidya
- Jyotsna Das as Vanita Prabhudesai
- Rohan Jaywant / Aastad Kale as Divij Prabhudesai
- Resham Tipnis as Grishma Rajneesh Sarangdhar
- Lokesh Gupte as Rajneesh Sarangdhar
- Sumukhi Pendse as Krutika Ratnani
- Shashank Sawant as Narhari Sawant
- Rahul Mehendale as Aryan Datar
- Milind Safai as Bhargav Dalvi
- Faiyaz Shaikh as Vrunda Hardikar
- Satish Joshi as Mr. Kadam
- Chandrakant Gokhale as Mauli
- Upendra Limaye as Aakash
- Meena Naik as Kamini
- Nisha Parulekar as Shubhada
- Sonali Naik as Chinmayee
- Megha Dhade as Pooja
- Vinay Apte as Janardan Chintan Swami
- Sunil Barve as Niranjan Hardikar
- Girish Oak as Raghunath Pandit
- Leena Bhagwat as Shruja Joshi
- Sunil Shende as Raosaheb Daftardar
- Sunil Godse as Dr. Kulkarni
- Shantanu Moghe as Jaydeep Bandal
- Pallavi Vaidya as Pranaya Deshmukh
- Sushant Shelar as Parth Deshmukh
- Shalmali Tolye as Vaibhavi Marathe
- Avishkar Darvhekar as Aalok Acharya
- Sameer Vijayan as Yuvraj Pandit
- Anil Gawas as Nityanand
- Atul Mahajan as Mr. Karkhanis
- Mugdha Shah as Mrs. Datar
- Milind Phatak as Mr. Gupte
- Pratibha Goregaonkar as Nilima
- Sachin Deshpande as Mr. Shetty
- Pournima Ahire as Mrs. Kashikar
- Vighnesh Joshi as Dhruv
- Kirti Pendharkar as Ritu
- Vijay Mishra as Ronit
- Pradnya Jadhav as Charvi
- Rajashri Nikam as Shashi
- Dipti Bhagwat as Anchor

== Awards ==
Zee Marathi Utsav Natyancha Awards
Year	Category	Recipient	Role
2006	Best Character Male	Rajan Bhise	Abhay
2006	Best Supporting Male	Girish Pardeshi	Mayuresh
2006	Best Series		
2007	Best Couple	Aishwarya Narkar-Rajan Bhise	Sarita-Abhay
2007	Best Supporting Male	Girish Pardeshi	Mayuresh
2007	Best Lyricist	Mangesh Kulkarni	
2007	Best Actress	Aishwarya Narkar	Sarita
2007	Best Mother	Aishwarya Narkar	Sarita
2008	Best Father	Rajan Bhise	Abhay
2008	Best Mother	Aishwarya Narkar	Sarita
2008	Best Family	Adhikari	
