= Aadesh Bandekar =

Indian actor

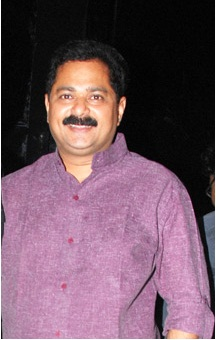
- Born: 18 January 1966 (age 60); Alibaug, Raigad, Maharashtra
- Other name: Bhauji
- Occupations: Actor, Politician, Producer
- Political party: Shiv Sena (UBT)
- Spouse: Suchitra Bandekar (m. 1990)
- Children: 1
- Family: Bandekar family

Aadesh Chandrakant Bandekar is a Marathi Actor, TV presenter, and Leader and Secretary of Shiv Sena (UBT). He is known for hosting the Marathi game show Home Minister on Zee Marathi since 2004. He is the former chairman of Shree Siddhivinayak Temple Trust with a status of Minister of State Government of Maharashtra. He holds a degree in M.A. political science from University of Mumbai (2020–22).

== Career ==
=== Entertainment ===
Bandekar hosted the musical Antakshari show Tak Dhina Dhin on DD National. Bandekar is known for hosting the game show Home Minister on Zee Marathi since 2004. In the show, Aadesh Bandekar visits various homes and plays games with house wives where the winner wins a Paithani saree. He is popular among the women of Maharashtra as Bhauji (lit. 'Brother-in-law'). In 2010, while he contested the State Assembly elections, the show was hosted by actor Jitendra Joshi. Bandekar resumed the show in 2011, after losing the elections. He has also hosted many other game shows like Hapta Band, WOW, DNA, Zing Zing Zingat and Divided. He has also done compering at award shows.

Bandekar has worked in Marathi TV serials like Avaghachi Sansar and Avantika on Zee Marathi. He debuted in films opposite Mrinal Kulkarni in the film Vishwaas.

Bandekar, under his banner "Soham Productions", is also the producer of the crime-based Marathi television show Lakshya that airs on Star Pravah.

=== Politics ===
Bandekar joined the Maharashtrian political party Shiv Sena in September 2009. He became the second member of Shiv Sena from the entertainment industry after singer and Indian Idol (season 1) winner Abhijeet Sawant had previously joined it. He contested the 2009 Maharashtra Assembly election from the Mahim Assembly constituency. He continued his work under Shiv Sena and played a backstage role in the 2012's Brihanmumbai Municipal Corporation elections.

Aadesh Bandekar is a chairman of Shree Siddhivinayak Ganpati Temple Trust since July 2017 - controlled by Government of Maharashtra as Minister of State. He is a president of Shiv Sena Chitrapat Sena. Aadesh Bandekar is also the brand ambassador of Matheran hill station and Abhyuday Bank. Aadesh Bandekar is a vice chairman of the International Roll Ball Federation.

== Personal life ==
Bandekar holds a degree in M.A. political science from University of Mumbai in 2022 and has graduated from the Osmania University, Hyderabad, in 1990, earning his bachelor's degree in commerce. He married Marathi and Hindi film and television actress Suchitra Bandekar in 1990. Their production house "Soham Productions" is named after their son Soham Bandekar.

== Filmography ==
Year	Title	Role	Channel
2002–2005	Avantika	Milind Pradhan	Alpha TV Marathi
2003	Tak Dhina Dhin	Host	DD Sahyadri
2004–present	Home Minister	Host	Zee Marathi
2006–2010	Avaghachi Sansar	Mayekar Sir	Zee Marathi
2008	Eka Peksha Ek	Host	Zee Marathi
2010	WOW	Host	Colors Marathi
2010–2011	DNA	Host	Colors Marathi
2009	Hapta Band	Host	Zee Marathi
2012	Divided	Host	Colors Marathi
2018–2019	Zing Zing Zingat	Host	Zee Marathi

Notes

1. • - In 2009 and 2011, Jitendra Joshi and Nilesh Sable hosted the show respectively.
