= Satyawan Savitri =

2022 Indian Marathi Mythological TV series

- Genre: Mythology
- Directed by: Vishal Bhosale
- Starring: See below
- Country of origin: India
- Original language: Marathi
- No. of episodes: 62

Production
- Executive producers: Shubham Salgare; Abhishek Virkar
- Producer: Santosh Kolhe
- Cinematography: Vinayak Jadhav
- Camera setup: Multi-camera
- Running time: 22 minutes
- Production company: The Film Clique

Original release
- Network: Zee Marathi
- Release: 12 June – 20 August 2022

Satyawan Savitri is an Indian Marathi language mythological TV series which aired on Zee Marathi. It is produced under the banner of The Film Clique and premiered from 12 June 2022 by replacing Man Jhala Bajind. It stars Vedangi Kulkarni and Aditya Durve in lead roles.

== Plot ==
An epic saga that defines the power of true love and shows how a resilient Savitri fights for her love and brings her husband, Satyavan, back from the clutches of death.

=== Special episode (1 hour) ===
- 12 June 2022
- 31 July 2022

== Cast ==
- Vedangi Kulkarni as Savitri
  - Radha Dharne as Child Savitri
- Aditya Durve as Satyawan
  - Arnav Kalkundri as Child Satyawan
- Vikram Gaikwad as Satyawan's father
- Prasanna Ketkar as Savitri's father
- Varsha Ghatpande as Savitri's grandmother
- Bageshree Deshpande
- Nandkishor Chikhale
