= List of Marathi television actors =

This is an alphabetical list of notable Marathi television actors.

Pioneers of Marathi television
2000s
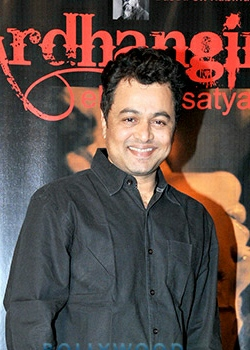
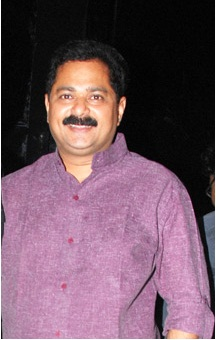
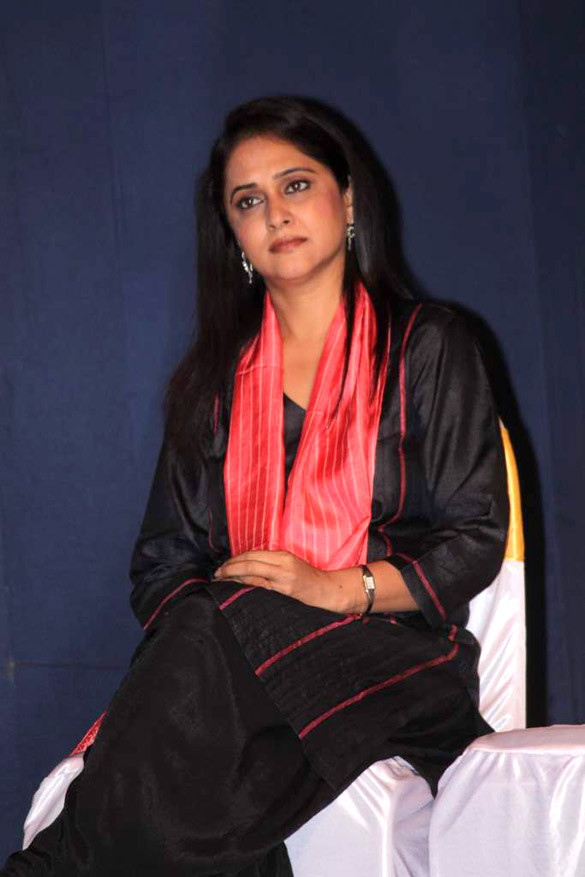
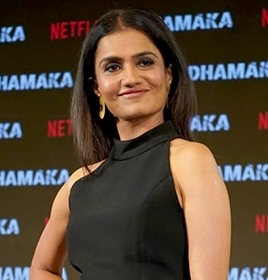
(left to right) Subodh Bhave, Aadesh Bandekar, Mrinal Kulkarni and Amruta Subhash

2010s
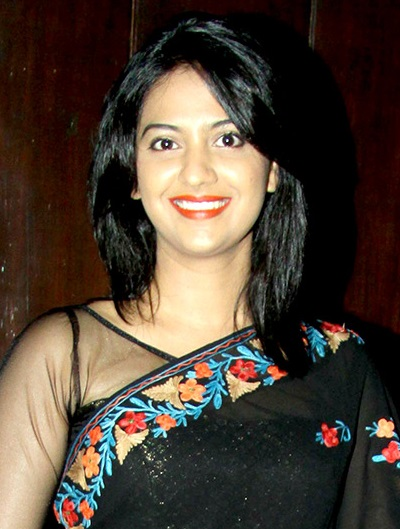
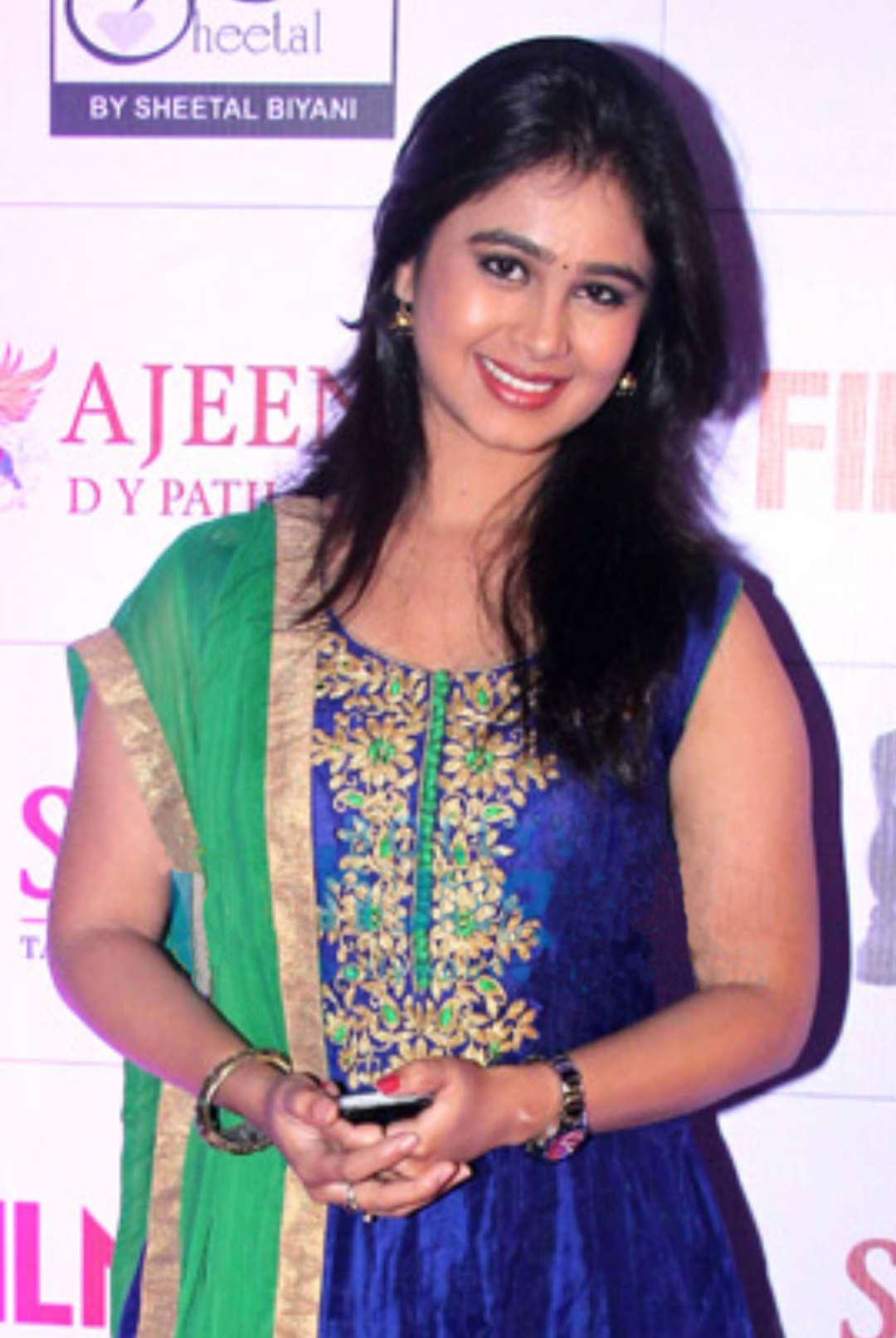
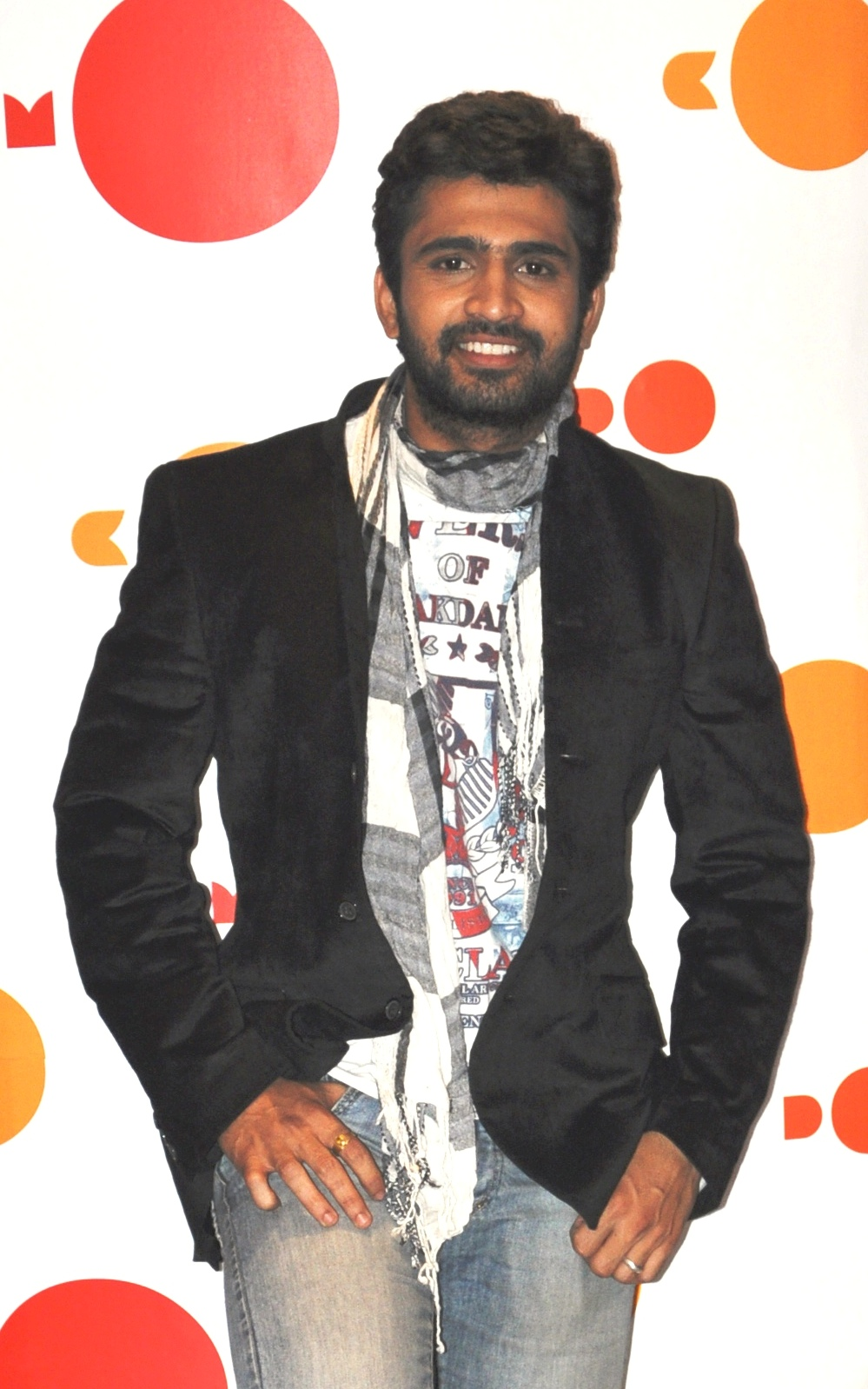
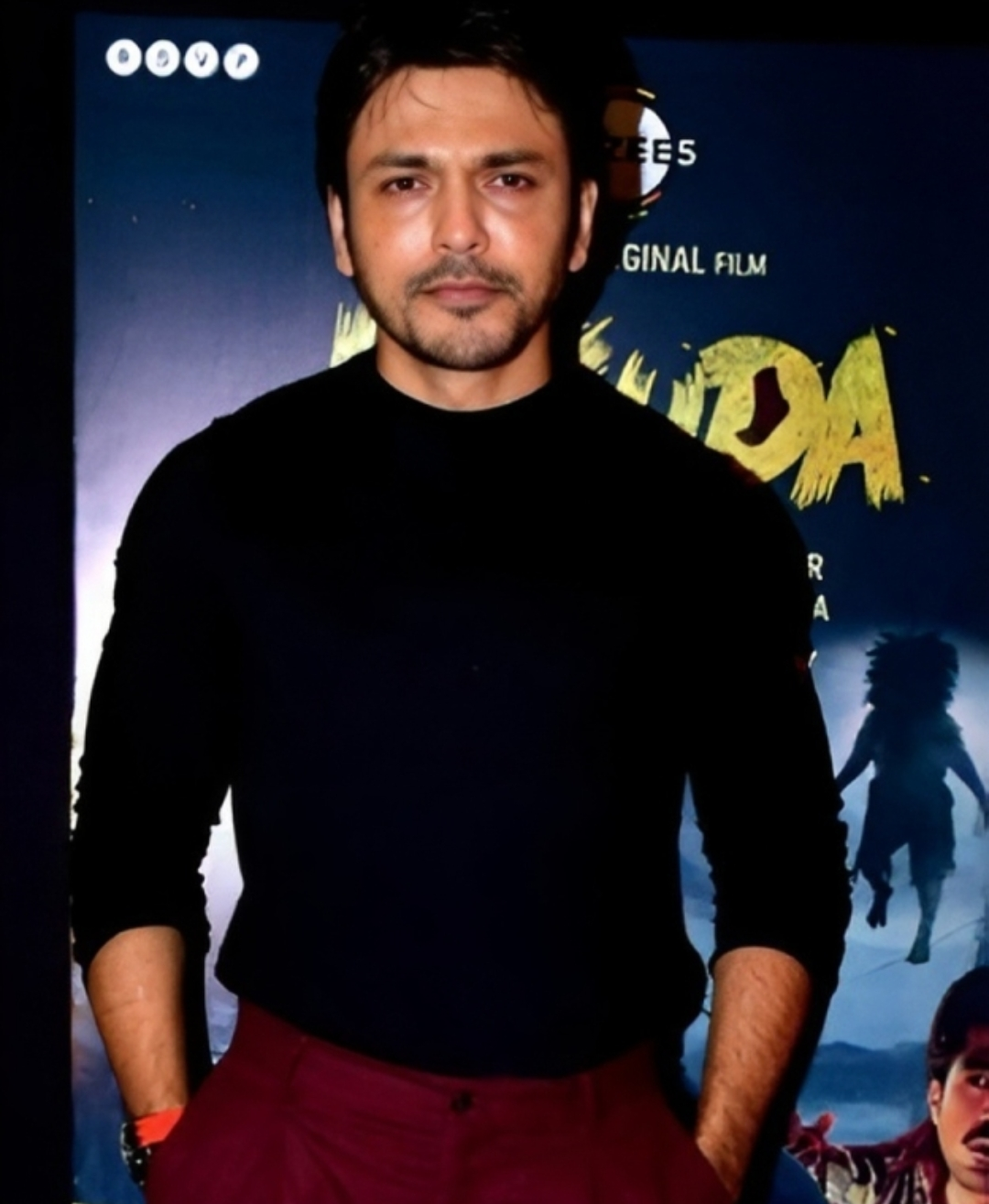
(left to right) Tejashri Pradhan, Mrunal Dusanis, Chinmay Udgirkar and Lalit Prabhakar

2020s
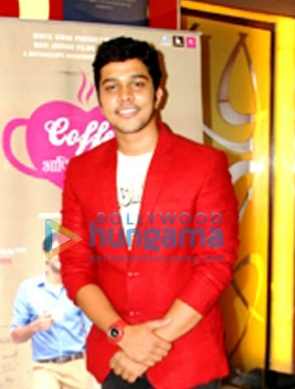
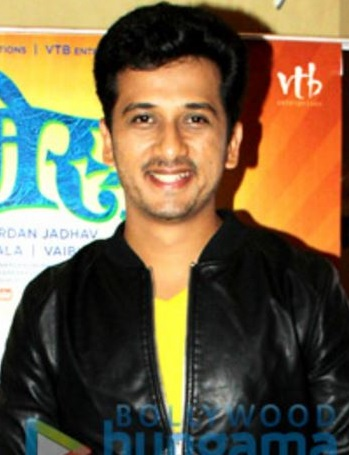
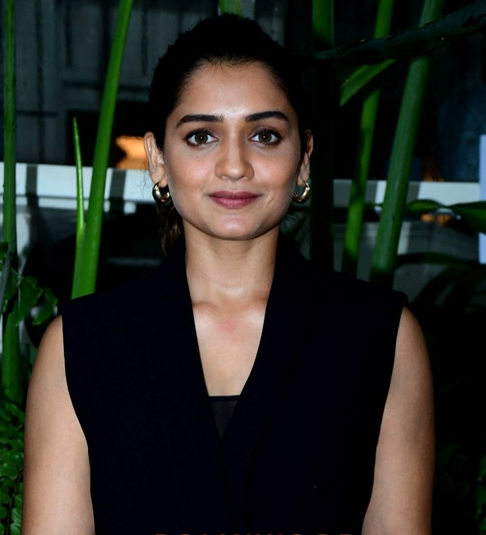
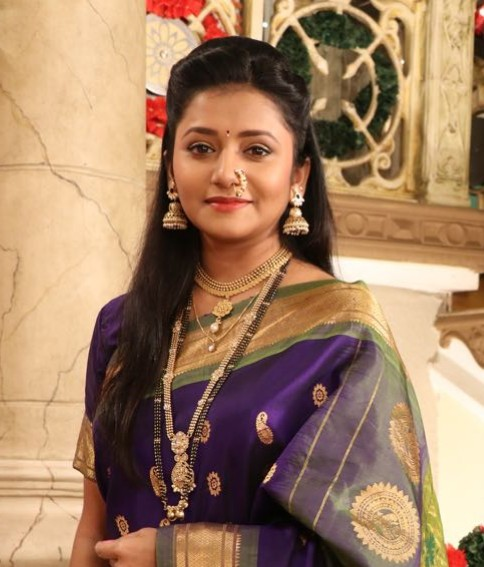
(left to right) Suyash Tilak, Abhijeet Khandkekar, Hruta Durgule and Jui Gadkari

== A ==
Debut year	Actor	Known for
1999	Anand Kale	Char Divas Sasuche; Majhi Tujhi Reshimgath; Swarajyarakshak Sambhaji; Jadubai Jorat
2003	Aadesh Bandekar	Home Minister; Zing Zing Zingat; Hapta Band; Avaghachi Sansar
2018	Aetashaa Sansgiri	Chhoti Malkin; Dakkhancha Raja Jotiba; Nivedita Majhi Taai; Tujhya Sobatine
2010	Abhidnya Bhave	Tula Pahate Re; Khulta Kali Khulena; Rang Majha Vegla; Lagori – Maitri Returns; Tu Tevha Tashi; Tarini
2010	Abhijeet Khandkekar	Maziya Priyala Preet Kalena; Majhya Navaryachi Bayko; Maharashtracha Superstar; Criminals – Chahul Gunhegaranchi; Tuzech Mi Geet Gaat Aahe
2015	Abhijit Amkar	Are Vedya Mana; Tujhya Vachun Karmena; Tu Hi Re Maza Mitwa
1998	Abhiram Bhadkamkar	Damini
1999	Achyut Potdar	Majha Hoshil Na; Jivachi Hotiya Kahili
2003	Aditi Sarangdhar	Vadalvaat; H.M. Bane T.M. Bane; Swarajyajanani Jijamata; Yeu Kashi Tashi Me Nandayla; Lakshya; Satvya Mulichi Satavi Mulgi; Muramba; Sanai Chaughade
2016	Adinath Kothare	100 Days; Nashibvan
1999	Aishwarya Narkar	Ya Sukhano Ya; Lek Majhi Ladki; Shreemantagharchi Suun; Swamini; Ya Valanavar; Satvya Mulichi Satavi Mulgi; Aamchya Ladkya Naik Bai
2011	Akshar Kothari	Swabhiman – Shodh Astitvacha; Chahool; Chhoti Malkin; Kamala; Bandh Reshmache; Lakshmichya Paulanni
2015	Akshay Kelkar	Bigg Boss Marathi 4; Dholkichya Talavar; Abeer Gulal; Kajalmaya
2011	Alka Kubal	Mangalsutra; Aai Majhi Kalubai
2015	Amey Wagh	Dil Dosti Duniyadari; Dil Dosti Dobara
1999	Amita Khopkar	Asambhav; Shubhmangal Online; Pinkicha Vijay Aso!; Gharoghari Matichya Chuli
2008	Amol Kolhe	Adhuri Ek Kahani; Raja Shivchhatrapati; Swarajyarakshak Sambhaji; Swarajyajanani Jijamata; Swarajya Saudamini Tararani; Mi Savitribai Jotirao Phule
2016	Amruta Deshmukh	Freshers; Me Tuzich Re; Lakshmi Niwas
2019	Amruta Khanvilkar	Jeevlaga
2006	Amruta Subhash	Avaghachi Sansar
2000	Anand Abhyankar	Asambhav; Mala Sasu Havi; Avaghachi Sansar
1995	Anant Jog	Gandh Phulancha Gela Sangun; Vadalvaat; Tarini
2003	Aniket Vishwasrao	Nayak; Kalat Nakalat; Oon Paaus
2011	Apurva Nemlekar	Aaradhana; Aabhas Ha; Ratris Khel Chale 2; Tuza Maza Jamtay; Ratris Khel Chale 3; Premachi Gosht; Shubhvivah
2008	Anita Date-Kelkar	Majhya Navaryachi Bayko; Eka Lagnachi Tisri Goshta; Nava Gadi Nava Rajya; Indrayani
2003	Anshuman Vichare	Comedy Express; Fu Bai Fu; Comedy Bimedy
2000	Arun Nalawade	Majhya Navaryachi Bayko; Avaghachi Sansar; Jigarbaaz; Shubham Karoti; Ka Re Durava; Man Udu Udu Jhala; Aabhalmaya; Vadalvaat; Aanandi
2005	Asawari Joshi	Eka Lagnachi Dusri Goshta; Mala Sasu Havi; Chukbhul Dyavi Ghyavi; Swabhiman – Shodh Astitvacha; Shubh Shravani
2007	Ashok Shinde	Avaghachi Sansar; Swapnanchya Palikadle; Majhe Pati Saubhagyawati; Swabhiman – Shodh Astitvacha; Chhatriwali; Saara Kahi Tichyasathi; Suna Yeti Ghara
1999	Atisha Naik	Aabhalmaya; Ghadge & Suun; Dilya Ghari Tu Sukhi Raha; Sundara Manamadhe Bharli; Sukh Mhanje Nakki Kay Asta!; Ghadlay Bighadlay; Yed Lagla Premacha
2000	Atul Kale	Majha Hoshil Na; Jivachi Hotiya Kahili
2013	Atul Parchure	Majha Hoshil Na; Bhago Mohan Pyare; Jaago Mohan Pyare; Ali Mili Gupchili; Honar Soon Mi Hya Gharchi

== B ==
Years active	Name	Known for
2014 – present	Bhagyashree Mote	Devyani; Jai Deva Shree Ganesha
1999 – present	Bharat Jadhav	Hasa Chakat Fu; Sukhi Mansacha Sadara; Saheb Bibi Aani Me; Paaru
2003 – present	Bharat Ganeshpure	Fu Bai Fu; Chala Hawa Yeu Dya
1994 – present	Bhargavi Chirmule	Fu Bai Fu; Asambhav; Swarajyajanani Jijamata; Vahinisaheb; Anubandh; Jaago Mohan Pyare; Molkarin Bai – Mothi Tichi Savali; Tarini; Marathi Medium
2011 – present	Bhalchandra Kadam	Fu Bai Fu; Chala Hawa Yeu Dya
2009 – present	Bhushan Pradhan	Kunku; Pinjara; Jai Bhawani Jai Shivaji

== C ==
Years active	Name	Known for
2010 – present	Chinmay Udgirkar	Ghadge & Suun; Nanda Saukhya Bhare; Sakkhe Shejari; Aggabai Sunbai; Swapnanchya Palikadle; Shubhvivah
2016 – present	Chirag Patil	Yek Number
2012 – present	Chinmay Mandlekar	Agnihotra; Tu Tithe Me; Tu Majha Saangaati

== D ==
Years active	Name	Known for
2001 – present	Dilip Prabhavalkar	Chukbhul Dyavi Ghyavi; Shriyut Gangadhar Tipre
2016 – present	Dnyanada Ramtirthkar	Sakhya Re; Shatada Prem Karave; Thipkyanchi Rangoli; Lagnanantar Hoilach Prem
2009 – present	Dushyant Wagh	Man Udhan Varyache; Kasturi; Lakshmi Niwas
2008 – present	Deepali Pansare	Devyani; Aai Kuthe Kay Karte!; Lakshmichya Paulanni

== G ==
Years active	Name	Known for
2018–present	Gautami Deshpande	Saare Tujhyachsathi; Majha Hoshil Na
2020–present	Gashmeer Mahajani	Dance Maharashtra Dance
1994–present	Girish Oak	Pinjara; Saheb Bibi Aani Me; Adhuri Ek Kahani; Agnihotra; Sukh Mhanje Nakki Kay Asta!; Boss Majhi Ladachi; Julun Yeti Reshimgathi; Aggabai Sasubai; Pasant Aahe Mulgi; Chhoti Malkin; Phulala Sugandha Maticha; Aggabai Sunbai; Lakhat Ek Aamcha Dada; Deep Jyoti
2007–present	Girija Oak	Lajja

== H ==
Years active	Name	Known for
2016 – present	Hardeek Joshi	Tujhyat Jeev Rangala; Tujhya Majhya Sansarala Aani Kay Hava!; Jau Bai Gavat; Tuzech Mi Geet Gaat Aahe
2013 – present	Harshad Atkari	Durva; Saare Tujhyachsathi; Phulala Sugandha Maticha; Kunya Rajachi Ga Tu Rani
1999 – present	Harshada Khanvilkar	Pudhcha Paaul; Rang Majha Vegla; Aabhalmaya; Sukh Mhanje Nakki Kay Asta!; Lakshmi Niwas; Kalat Nakalat; Mulgi Pasant Aahe!
2003 – present	Hemangi Kavi	Vadalvaat; Avaghachi Sansar; Man Dhaga Dhaga Jodte Nava; Lek Majhi Durga; Mrs. Mukhyamantri; Tu Anolakhi Tari Sobati
2000 – present	Hrishikesh Joshi	Ghadlay Bighadlay
2013 – present	Hruta Durgule	Durva; Phulpakharu; Singing Star; Man Udu Udu Jhala

== I ==
Years active	Name	Known for
2014 – present	Isha Keskar	Majhya Navaryachi Bayko; Jai Malhar; Lakshmichya Paulanni

== J ==
Years active	Name	Known for
2001 – present	Jitendra Joshi	Home Minister; Marathi Paaul Padte Pudhe
2010 – present	Jui Gadkari	Pudhcha Paaul; Tharala Tar Mag!

== K ==
Years active	Name	Known for
2006 – present	Kadambari Kadam	Tujvin Sakhya Re; Avaghachi Sansar
2001 – present	Kavita Lad	Char Divas Sasuche; Unch Majha Zoka; Radha Hi Bawari; Radha Prem Rangi Rangli; Tula Shikvin Changlach Dhada
1999 – present	Kishor Kadam	Kaay Ghadla Tya Ratri?
1987 – present	Kishori Shahane	Jadubai Jorat; Pinkicha Vijay Aso!; Don Kinare Doghi Aapan; Yed Lagla Premacha
1995 – 2014	Kuldeep Pawar	Damini
2005 – present	Kushal Badrike	Fu Bai Fu; Chala Hawa Yeu Dya; Shubham Karoti

== L ==
Years active	Name	Known for
2010 – present	Leena Bhagwat	Agnihotra; Honar Soon Mi Hya Gharchi; Fu Bai Fu; Eka Lagnachi Dusri Goshta; Aathashe Khidkya Naushe Dare; Thipkyanchi Rangoli
2013 – present	Lalit Prabhakar	Gandh Phulancha Gela Sangun; Aabhas Ha; Julun Yeti Reshimgathi; Dil Dosti Duniyadari

== M ==
Years active	Name	Known for
2006 – present	Maadhav Deochake	Devyani; Tuza Maza Breakup
2003 – present	Madhurani Gokhale	Aai Kuthe Kay Karte!; Asambhav; Mi Savitribai Jotirao Phule
2008 – present	Mandar Chandwadkar	Vadalvaat
1996 – present	Manasi Salvi	Asambhav; Kaay Ghadla Tya Ratri?
2013 – present	Manava Naik	Tuza Maza Jamena; Tumchi Mulgi Kay Karte?
2011 – present	Mayuri Deshmukh	Khulta Kali Khulena; Man Dhaga Dhaga Jodte Nava
2008 – present	Mayuri Wagh	Ti Phulrani; Aashirvad Tuza Ekvira Aai; Asmita; Love Lagna Locha; Aboli
2000 – present	Mukta Barve	Agnihotra; Eka Lagnachi Dusri Goshta; Rudram; Ajunahi Barsaat Aahe; Aabhalmaya; Ghadlay Bighadlay
2008 – present	Mitali Mayekar	Freshers; Ladachi Mi Lek Ga!
2003 – present	Milind Shinde	Aai Majhi Kalubai; Agnihotra; Majhya Navaryachi Bayko; Sukh Mhanje Nakki Kay Asta!; Tu Tithe Me; Gatha Navnathanchi; 36 Guni Jodi; Devmanus 2; Rang Majha Vegla; Constable Manju; Devmanus – Madhla Adhyay
1994 – present	Milind Gawali	Aai Kuthe Kay Karte!; Tu Ashi Jawali Raha; Vachan Dile Tu Mala
1993 – present	Milind Gunaji	Bhatkanti; Kulvadhu; Discover Maharashtra
1987 – present	Mohan Agashe	Agnihotra; Eka Lagnachi Tisri Goshta; Rudram; Guntata Hriday He
1999 – present	Mohan Joshi	Agnihotra; Eka Lagnachi Dusri Goshta; Eka Lagnachi Tisri Goshta; Kahe Diya Pardes; Aggabai Sasubai; Jeev Zala Yedapisa; Aggabai Sunbai; Majhi Tujhi Reshimgath; Sant Gajanan Shegaviche
2020 – present	Monalisa Bagal	Total Hublak
1990 – present	Mrinal Kulkarni	Raja Shivchhatrapati; Avantika; Guntata Hriday He
2010 – present	Mrunal Dusanis	Maziya Priyala Preet Kalena; Tu Tithe Me; Sukhachya Sarini He Man Baware; Assa Sasar Surekh Baai; Lagnanantar Hoilach Prem
2009 – present	Mrunmayee Deshpande	Agnihotra; Kunku; Band Baja Varat; Sa Re Ga Ma Pa Marathi Li'l Champs

== N ==
Years active	Name	Known for
2017 – present	Nayana Apte Joshi	Chukbhul Dyavi Ghyavi; Sukhachya Sarini He Man Baware; Yashoda – Goshta Shyamchya Aaichi; Khumasdar Natyancha Goda Masala; Bayko Ashi Havvi; Gharoghari Matichya Chuli
1999 – present	Neelam Shirke	Vadalvaat; Asambhav; Chaar Choughi
2004 – present	Neena Kulkarni	Adhuri Ek Kahani; Swarajyajanani Jijamata; Pratishodh – Jhunj Astitvachi; Yed Lagla Premacha
1999 – present	Neha Bam	Avaghachi Sansar; Tujhyat Jeev Rangala; Navri Mile Hitlerla
1998 – present	Nagesh Bhonsle	Agnihotra; Devyani; Tu Chandane Shimpit Jashi; Tujhya Ishkacha Naadkhula
2015 – present	Nandita Patkar	Majhe Pati Saubhagyawati; Sahkutumb Sahparivar
2000 – present	Neha Joshi	Ka Re Durava; Avaghachi Sansar
2019 – present	Neha Khan	Devmanus
1998 – present	Neha Pendse	Bhagyalakshmi
2009 – present	Neha Shitole	Ka Re Durava; Kunku; Tu Tithe Me
2017 – present	Nitish Chavan	Lagira Zala Ji; Lakhat Ek Aamcha Dada
2017 – present	Nikhil Chavan	Lagira Zala Ji; Karbhari Laybhari
2001 – present	Nikhil Raut	Tu Tithe Me; Kahe Diya Pardes; Yeu Kashi Tashi Me Nandayla
2010 – present	Nilesh Sable	Fu Bai Fu; Chala Hawa Yeu Dya; Laav Re Toh Video; Ek Mohor Abol
1995 – present	Nirmiti Sawant	Fu Bai Fu; Kumari Gangubai Non-Matric; 1760 Sasubai; Jadubai Jorat; Constable Kamana Kamtekar
1990 – present	Nishigandha Wad	Kulvadhu; Jai Bhawani Jai Shivaji
1998 – present	Nivedita Saraf	Aggabai Sasubai; Duheri; Bandhan; Aggabai Sunbai; Bhagya Dile Tu Mala; Aai Ani Baba Retire Hot Aahet!; Krushnaichya Leki

== P ==
Years active	Name	Known for
2006 – present	Prasad Jawade	Ase He Kanyadan; Arundhati; Paaru; Laxmi vs Saraswati; Kavyanjali – Sakhi Savali; Maziya Priyala Preet Kalena; Deep Jyoti
2020 – present	Pallavi Patil	Jigarbaaz; Nava Gadi Nava Rajya
2004 – present	Pallavi Subhash	Char Divas Sasuche; Adhuri Ek Kahani
2006 – present	Pallavi Joshi	Grahan
1999 – present	Pari Telang	Aabhalmaya; Lakshya; Paaru; Fu Bai Fu; Lavangi Mirchi; Tu Chal Pudha; Sadhi Manasa; Comedy Bimedy
2005 – present	Piyush Ranade	Kata Rute Kunala; Ekach Hya Janmi Janu; Asmita; Pinkicha Vijay Aso!; Kavyanjali – Sakhi Savali; Aadishakti; Anjali; Lajja
2001 – present	Poorva Gokhale	Kulvadhu; Swarajyarakshak Sambhaji; Veen Doghantali Hi Tutena
1990 – present	Prateeksha Lonkar	Damini; Aboli; Swarajyarakshak Sambhaji
2009 – present	Pratiksha Jadhav	Dilya Ghari Tu Sukhi Raha; Molkarin Bai – Mothi Tichi Savali; Kasturi; Devmanus; Tuza Maza Jamtay; Tujhya Ishkacha Naadkhula; Aai Ani Baba Retire Hot Aahet!
2011 – present	Prajakta Mali	Julun Yeti Reshimgathi; Naktichya Lagnala Yaycha Ha; Maharashtrachi Hasyajatra
1993 – present	Prasad Oak	Avaghachi Sansar; Phulpakharu; Honar Soon Mi Hya Gharchi; Hum To Tere Aashiq Hai; Bhanda Saukhya Bhare; Maharashtrachi Hasyajatra
2007 – present	Prashant Damle	Aamhi Saare Khavayye; Kitchen Kallakar; Aaj Kay Special
2000 – present	Priya Bapat	Shubham Karoti; De Dhamal; Aamhi Travelkar
2006 – 2025	Priya Marathe	Ya Sukhano Ya; Char Divas Sasuche; Tu Tithe Me; Swarajyajanani Jijamata; Yeu Kashi Tashi Me Nandayla; Tuzech Mi Geet Gaat Aahe; Tu Bhetashi Navyane
2007 – present	Prarthana Behere	Majhi Tujhi Reshimgath
2000 – present	Priyadarshan Jadhav	Fu Bai Fu; Chukbhul Dyavi Ghyavi
1998 – present	Pushkar Shrotri	Avaghachi Sansar; Hum To Tere Aashiq Hai; Vadalvaat; Sun Sasu Sun
1989 – present	Pushkar Jog	Vachan Dile Tu Mala
2015 – present	Pushkaraj Chirputkar	Dil Dosti Duniyadari; Dil Dosti Dobara; Assa Maher Nako Ga Bai!; Band Baja Varat

== R ==
Years active	Name	Known for
2000	Ramesh Bhatkar	Tu Tithe Me; Majhe Pati Saubhagyawati; 100 Days
1999	Rasika Joshi	Ghadlay Bighadlay; Prapanch
2016	Rasika Sunil	Majhya Navaryachi Bayko
1986	Ravi Patwardhan	Aggabai Sasubai
1985	Reema Lagoo	Tuza Maza Jamena
2009	Reena Madhukar	Man Udu Udu Jhala
1993	Resham Tipnis	Ya Sukhano Ya; Aboli
2010	Reshma Shinde	Nanda Saukhya Bhare; Rang Majha Vegla; Lagori – Maitri Returns; Gharoghari Matichya Chuli
2016	Rishi Saxena	Kahe Diya Pardes; Ghadge & Suun; Aai Kuthe Kay Karte!
1997	Rohini Hattangadi	Char Divas Sasuche; Honar Soon Mi Hya Gharchi; Sakhya Re; Vahinisaheb; Boss Majhi Ladachi; Yashoda – Goshta Shyamchya Aaichi; Tuza Maza Breakup; Tharala Tar Mag!
2009	Ruchi Savarn	Sakhya Re
2015	Ruchira Jadhav	Majhya Navaryachi Bayko; 36 Guni Jodi; Majhe Pati Saubhagyawati; Tu Hi Re Maza Mitwa
2009	Rupali Bhosale	Aai Kuthe Kay Karte!; Man Udhan Varyache; Don Kinare Doghi Aapan; Lapandaav
2013	Rutuja Bagwe	Nanda Saukhya Bhare; Chandra Aahe Sakshila
2010	Renuka Shahane	Yala Jeevan Aise Naav; Fu Bai Fu; Band Baja Varat

== S ==
Years active	Name	Known for
2002 – present	Sachit Patil	Aboli; Radha Prem Rangi Rangli; Tu Chandane Shimpit Jashi
1994 – present	Sachin Khedekar	Kon Honar Crorepati; Bandhan
2009 – present	Sai Tamhankar	Anubandh; Maharashtrachi Hasyajatra
2014 – present	Sakhi Gokhale	Dil Dosti Duniyadari; Dil Dosti Dobara; Aathshe Khidkya Naushe Dare
2012 – present	Saksham Kulkarni	Aambat Goad; Paaru; Love Lagna Locha
1993 – present	Samir Choughule	Comedy Express; Maharashtrachi Hasyajatra
1992 – present	Sanjay Mone	Aabhalmaya; Aambat Goad; Pasant Aahe Mulgi; Shiva; Avaghachi Sansar; Maziya Priyala Preet Kalena; Kanala Khada; Khulta Kali Khulena
1999 – present	Sanjay Narvekar	Tujhya Ishkacha Naadkhula
2004 – present	Sanjay Jadhav	Kaay Ghadla Tya Ratri?
2011 – present	Sanskruti Balgude	Pinjara
1999 – present	Savita Prabhune	Jawai Vikat Ghene Aahe; Oon Paaus; Mala Sasu Havi; Khulta Kali Khulena; Saath De Tu Mala; Gharoghari Matichya Chuli; Swabhiman – Shodh Astitvacha
2016 – present	Sayali Sanjeev	Kahe Diya Pardes; Shubhmangal Online
2011 – present	Shashank Ketkar	Rang Maza Vegla; Honar Soon Mi Hya Gharchi; Sukhachya Sarini He Man Baware; Pahile Na Mi Tula; Muramba; Kamli
1999 – present	Sharad Ponkshe	Vadalvaat; Durva; Kunku; Shiva; Agnihotra; Vahinisaheb; Ase He Kanyadan; Thipkyanchi Rangoli; Daar Ughad Baye; Bai Tuza Ashirvad
2009 – present	Sharmishtha Raut	Saara Kahi Tichyasathi; Unch Majha Zoka; Sukhachya Sarini He Man Baware; Aboli; Julun Yeti Reshimgathi; Man Udhan Varyache; Suna Yeti Ghara
1993 – present	Shilpa Tulaskar	Megh Datale; Tula Pahate Re; Tu Tevha Tashi
1999 – present	Shreyas Talpade	Aabhalmaya; Vadalvaat; Majhi Tujhi Reshimgath
2017 – present	Shivani Baokar	Lagira Zala Ji; Lavangi Mirchi; Alti Palti Sumdit Kalti; Sadhi Manasa
2011 – present	Shivani Surve	Devyani; Thoda Tuza Ani Thoda Maza
2015 – present	Shiv Thakare	Bigg Boss Marathi 2
1989 – present	Shubhangi Gokhale	Agnihotra; Kahe Diya Pardes; Yeu Kashi Tashi Me Nandayla; Shriyut Gangadhar Tipre; Raja Ranichi Ga Jodi; Premachi Gosht; Manthan
1998 – 2022	Shubhangi Joshi	Aabhalmaya; Kahe Diya Pardes; Tumcha Aamcha Same Asta; Vadalvaat; Kunku Tikali Ani Tatoo
2009 – present	Shreya Bugde	Tu Tithe Me; Chala Hawa Yeu Dya
2010 – present	Shruti Marathe	Radha Hi Bawari; Jaago Mohan Pyare
1998 – present	Shweta Shinde	Lakshya; Doctor Don; Avaghachi Sansar
2010 – present	Siddharth Chandekar	Agnihotra; Sang Tu Aahes Ka?; Jeevlaga
2007 – present	Smita Gondkar	Kaay Ghadla Tya Ratri?
2009 – present	Smita Tambe	Ladachi Mi Lek Ga!; Anubandh
2007 – present	Sneha Wagh	Kata Rute Kunala; Adhuri Ek Kahani
2008 – present	Sonalika Joshi	Taarak Mehta Ka Ooltah Chashmah
2012 – present	Spruha Joshi	Agnihotra; Unch Majha Zoka; Eka Lagnachi Dusri Goshta; Eka Lagnachi Tisri Goshta; Sur Nava Dhyas Nava; Lokmanya
1998 – present	Subodh Bhave	Peshwai; Kulvadhu; Avantika; Vadalvaat; Tula Pahate Re; Chandra Aahe Sakshila; Ka Re Durava; Bus Bai Bas; Tu Bhetashi Navyane; Veen Doghantali Hi Tutena
2007 – present	Suchitra Bandekar	Vahinisaheb; Avantika; Aabhas Ha
1972 – present	Suhas Joshi	Aabhalmaya; Kunku; Agnihotra; Tu Tevha Tashi; Jagavegali
1998 – present	Sukanya Kulkarni	Aabhalmaya; Julun Yeti Reshimgathi; Ghadge & Suun; Vadalvaat; Chukbhul Dyavi Ghyavi; Shubhmangal Online; Aga Aga Sunbai Kay Mhanta Sasubai?; Kalat Nakalat; Kon Hotis Tu, Kay Zalis Tu!; Ase He Sundar Aamche Ghar
2007 – present	Suruchi Adarkar	Ka Re Durava; Avaghachi Sansar; Satvya Mulichi Satavi Mulgi; Muramba; Anjali – Jhep Swapnanchi; Olakh – Dhyas Swapnancha; Girls Hostel; Ek Ghar Mantarlela
2012 – present	Surabhi Hande	Jai Malhar; Lakshmi Sadaiv Mangalam
1994 – present	Sulekha Talwalkar	Char Divas Sasuche; Agnihotra; Majha Hoshil Na; Shejari Shejari Pakke Shejari; Sang Tu Aahes Ka?; Ase He Kanyadan; Avantika; Savalyachi Janu Savali; Muramba
2010 – present	Suyash Tilak	Durva; Aboli; Ka Re Durava; Baapmanus; Jivachi Hotiya Kahili; Shubhmangal Online; Sakhya Re; Ek Ghar Mantarlela
2014 – present	Suvrat Joshi	Dil Dosti Duniyadari; Dil Dosti Dobara; Aathshe Khidkya Naushe Dare
1995 – present	Supriya Pathare	Honar Soon Mi Hya Gharchi; Pudhcha Paaul; Thipkyanchi Rangoli; Jago Mohan Pyaare; Kulvadhu; Sadhi Manasa; Molkarin Bai – Mothi Tichi Savali
1994 – present	Supriya Pilgaonkar	Tu Tu Main Main
1986 – present	Sulabha Deshpande	Asmita; Savitri
1980 – present	Sunil Barve	Sahkutumb Sahparivar; Grahan; Kunku; Paaru; Avantika; Megh Datale; Kalat Nakalat
2017 – present	Suyog Gorhe	Majhya Navaryachi Bayko
1999 – present	Sharvani Pillai	Tuza Ni Maza Ghar Shrimantacha; Avantika; Aambat Goad; Khumasdar Natyancha Goda Masala; Swarajyarakshak Sambhaji; Mulgi Zali Ho; Khulta Kali Khulena
1989 – present	Swapnil Joshi	Fu Bai Fu; Eka Lagnachi Dusri Goshta; Kon Honar Crorepati; Chala Hawa Yeu Dya; Jeevlaga; Adhuri Ek Kahani; Tu Tevha Tashi
2013 – present	Swarda Thigale	Majhe Mann Tujhe Zale; Swarajya Saudamini Tararani; Premachi Gosht
2015 – present	Swanandi Tikekar	Dil Dosti Duniyadari; Dil Dosti Dobara; Assa Maher Nako Ga Bai!; Aga Aga Sunbai Kay Mhanta Sasubai?
2000 – present	Swapnil Rajshekhar	Tula Shikvin Changlach Dhada; Swarajyarakshak Sambhaji; Jai Malhar; Raja Shivchhatrapati; Asava Sundar Swapnancha Bangla; Swapnanchya Palikadle
1988 – present	Seema Shinde	Durga Zali Gauri; Bandini

== T ==
Years active	Name	Known for
2021 – present	Tanaji Galgunde	Man Jhala Bajind
2007 – present	Tejashri Pradhan	Hya Gojirvanya Gharat; Tuza Ni Maza Ghar Shrimantacha; Lek Ladaki Hya Gharchi; Honar Soon Mi Hya Gharchi; Sur Nava Dhyas Nava; Aggabai Sasubai; Premachi Gosht; Veen Doghantali Hi Tutena
2005 – present	Teja Devkar	Vrundavan
2005 – present	Tejaswini Lonari	Devmanus 2; Tuzech Mi Geet Gaat Aahe
2004 – present	Tejaswini Pandit	Ekach Hya Janmi Janu; 100 Days; Lajja; Kalay Tasmai Namah; Tuza Ni Maza Ghar Shrimantacha
2000 – present	Trupti Bhoir	Char Divas Sasuche
1998 – present	Tushar Dalvi	Duheri; Saibaba; Anubandh; Lakshmi Niwas

== U ==
Years active	Name	Known for
2006 – present	Urmilla Kothare	Asambhav; Tuzech Mi Geet Gaat Aahe
1999 – present	Usha Nadkarni	Khulta Kali Khulena; Ase He Sundar Aamche Ghar; Prapanch
2007 – present	Umesh Kamat	Aabhalmaya; Vadalvaat; Asambhav; Eka Lagnachi Tisri Goshta; Ajunahi Barsaat Aahe
1999 – present	Uday Sabnis	Majhe Pati Saubhagyawati; Nave Lakshya; Avaghachi Sansar

== V ==
Years active	Name	Known for
2010 – present	Vaibhav Tatwawadi	Amarprem; Tuza Maza Jamena
2004 – present	Vaibhav Mangle	Fu Bai Fu; Shejari Shejari Pakke Shejari; Ek Gaav Bhutacha; Malwani Days; Chandravilas; Majhe Pati Saubhagyawati; Kon Hotis Tu, Kay Zalis Tu!
1987 – present	Varsha Usgaonkar	Man Udhan Varyache; Tujhyavina; Sukh Mhanje Nakki Kay Asta!
1999 – 2015	Vinay Apte	Vahinisaheb; Agnihotra; Bhagyalaxmi; Ya Sukhano Ya; Durva
2004 – present	Vishakha Subhedar	Fu Bai Fu; Ka Re Durava; Shubhvivah; Maharashtrachi Hasyajatra
2019 – present	Vishal Nikam	Dakkhancha Raja Jotiba; Aai Mayecha Kavach; Sata Jalmachya Gathi; Yed Lagla Premacha
2005 – 2023	Vikram Gokhale	Ya Sukhano Ya; Tuzech Mi Geet Gaat Aahe

== Y ==
Years active	Name	Known for
2010 – present	Yashashri Masurkar	Bigg Boss Marathi 4
