= List of programmes broadcast by Star Pravah =

Star Pravah is an Indian Marathi language general entertainment channel which is owned by Disney Star. This is the list of programmes broadcast by the channel.

== Current broadcast ==
Premiere date	Series	Adaptation of	Ref.
5 December 2022	Tharala Tar Mag!	Tamil TV series Roja	
18 March 2024	Gharoghari Matichya Chuli	Hindi TV series Kahaani Ghar Ghar Kii	
16 December 2024	Lagnanantar Hoilach Prem	Tamil TV series Eeramana Rojave 2	
23 December 2024	Tu Hi Re Maza Mitwa	Hindi TV series Iss Pyaar Ko Kya Naam Doon?	
15 September 2025	Lapandaav		
30 March 2026	Aanandi	Hindi TV series Bandini	
27 April 2026	Bai Tuza Ashirvad	Tamil TV series Ayyanar Thunai	
1 June 2026	Pathrakhin	Hindi TV series Sapna Babul Ka... Bidaai	
15 June 2026	Suna Yeti Ghara	Tamil TV series Pandian Stores 2	
29 June 2026	Visaru Nako Tu Mala		
28 September 2026	Mi Kaat Takali		
12 October 2026	Marathi Medium	Bengali TV series Bangla Medium	
26 October 2026	Tuzyakade Tula Magane	Hindi TV series Choti Sarrdaarni	

=== Reality show ===
Premiere date	Show	Adaptation of	Ref.
29 August 2026	Aata Hou De Dhingana 5	Tamil TV show Enkitta Modhaade	

== Former broadcast ==
=== Drama series ===
Premiere date	Series	Last aired	Adaptation of
24 November 2008	Raja Shivchhatrapati	19 September 2009	
27 November 2008	Agnihotra	30 April 2010	
27 July 2009	Man Udhan Varyache	1 October 2011	Bengali TV series Bou Kotha Kao
16 August 2010	Swapnanchya Palikadle	14 June 2014	
2 May 2011	Pudhcha Paaul	1 July 2017	Hindi TV series Saath Nibhaana Saathiya
25 August 2011	Lakshya	17 September 2016	
19 March 2012	Devyani	28 May 2016	Hindi TV series Mann Kee Awaaz Pratigya
18 March 2013	Durva	12 November 2016	
2 May 2016	Lek Majhi Ladki	21 October 2018	Malayalam TV series Kumkumapoovu
30 October 2017	Vithu Mauli	22 March 2020	
27 November 2017	Nakalat Saare Ghadle	17 May 2019	Hindi TV series Yeh Hai Mohabbatein
18 June 2018	Chhatriwali	21 September 2019	Malayalam TV series Kasthooriman
25 March 2019	Molkarin Bai – Mothi Tichi Savali	21 August 2020	
22 April 2019	Jeevlaga	1 August 2019	
18 May 2019	Dr. Babasaheb Ambedkar – Mahamanvachi Gauravgatha	17 October 2020	
17 June 2019	Shree Gurudev Dutta	4 January 2020	
30 October 2019	Rang Majha Vegla	3 September 2023	Malayalam TV series Karuthamuthu
23 December 2019	Aai Kuthe Kay Karte!	30 November 2024	Bengali TV series Sreemoyee
27 January 2020	Premacha Game Same To Same	27 March 2020	Tamil TV series Naam Iruvar Namakku Iruvar
24 February 2020	Sahkutumb Sahparivar	3 August 2023	Tamil TV series Pandian Stores
9 March 2020	Vaiju No. 1	5 December 2020	
17 August 2020	Sukh Mhanje Nakki Kay Asta!	22 December 2024	Bengali TV series Ke Apon Ke Por
22 August 2020	Jai Deva Shree Ganesha	1 September 2020	
2 September 2020	Phulala Sugandha Maticha	4 December 2022	Hindi TV series Diya Aur Baati Hum
2 September 2020	Mulgi Zali Ho	14 January 2023	Telugu TV series Mounaraagam
7 December 2020	Sang Tu Aahes Ka?	2 October 2021	
22 February 2021	Swabhiman – Shodh Astitvacha	6 May 2023	Bengali TV series Mohor
26 July 2021	Jay Bhawani Jay Shivaji	28 November 2021	
4 October 2021	Thipkyanchi Rangoli	18 November 2023	Bengali TV series Khorkuto
23 November 2021	Aboli	26 October 2025	
31 January 2022	Lagnachi Bedi	15 December 2024	Bengali TV series Kusum Dola
31 January 2022	Pinkicha Vijay Aso!	26 May 2024	Hindi TV series Nimki Mukhiya
14 February 2022	Muramba	28 June 2026	Hindi TV series Suhani Si Ek Ladki
2 May 2022	Tuzech Mi Geet Gaat Aahe	16 June 2024	Bengali TV series Potol Kumar Gaanwala
16 January 2023	Shubhvivah	1 March 2026	Telugu TV series Chelleli Kapuram
8 May 2023	Man Dhaga Dhaga Jodte Nava	5 November 2024	
18 July 2023	Kunya Rajachi Ga Tu Rani	16 March 2024	Bengali TV series Ishti Kutum
4 September 2023	Premachi Gosht	5 July 2025	Hindi TV series Yeh Hai Mohabbatein
20 November 2023	Lakshmichya Paulanni	12 December 2025	Bengali TV series Gaatchora
18 March 2024	Sadhi Manasa	29 March 2026	Tamil TV series Siragadikka Aasai
27 May 2024	Yed Lagla Premacha	16 August 2026	Telugu series Gorintaku
17 June 2024	Thoda Tuza Ani Thoda Maza	12 September 2025	Tamil TV series Deivamagal
2 December 2024	Aai Aani Baba Retire Hot Aahet	13 September 2025	
28 April 2025	Kon Hotis Tu, Kaay Zalis Tu	4 January 2026	Kannada TV series Shrimathi Bhagyalakshmi
7 July 2025	Halad Rusli Kunku Hasla	8 August 2026	Telugu TV series Devatha
15 September 2025	Nashibvan	25 April 2026	Tamil TV series Nayagi
27 October 2025	Kajalmaya	11 January 2026	
15 December 2025	Vachan Dile Tu Mala	11 October 2026	Bengali TV series Geeta LL.B
5 January 2026	Me Savitribai Jotirao Phule	14 June 2026	
10 August 2026	Aamchya Ladka Naik Bai	21 November 2026	

=== Dubbed series ===
1. 5 STAR Kitchen ITC Chef's Special (2020–2021)
2. Devanche Dev Mahadev (2020)
3. Mahabharat (2020)
4. Ramayan (2020)
5. Shree Ganesh (2020)
6. Satyamev Jayate (2012–2014)

=== Reality shows ===
1. Mi Honar Superstar (2020–2024)
2. Me Honar Superstar – Chhote Ustad (2021–2026)
3. Aata Hou De Dhingana (2022 - 2026)
4. Shitti Vaajli Re (2026)
