= Vahinisaheb =

2006 Indian Marathi language TV series

- Genre: Drama
- Directed by: Virendra Pradhan
- Starring: See below
- Country of origin: India
- Original language: Marathi
- No. of episodes: 739

Production
- Producer: Smita Thackeray
- Production locations: Kolhapur, Maharashtra
- Camera setup: Multi-camera
- Running time: 22 minutes
- Production company: Rahul Production

Original release
- Network: Zee Marathi
- Release: 20 November 2006 – 9 May 2009

Vahinisaheb (transl. Sister-in-law) is an Indian Marathi-language television series which aired on Zee Marathi. It premiered from 20 November 2006 by replacing Oon Paaus. It starred Bhargavi Chirmule and Suchitra Bandekar in lead roles. It is produced by Smita Thackeray and directed by Virendra Pradhan under the banner of Rahul Production.

== Cast ==
=== Main ===
- Bhargavi Chirmule as Bhairavi Vishwas Kirloskar (Kusum)
- Rugvedi Pradhan / Bhagyashri Rane as Neha Bhaiyyasaheb Kirloskar / Neha Kunal Jaykar / Akanksha Akash Sasane

=== Recurring ===
Bhairavi's family

- Vinay Apte as Bhaiyyasaheb Kirloskar
- Suchitra Bandekar as Yamini Bhaiyyasaheb Kirloskar (Akka)
- Onkar Karve as Vishwas Bhaiyyasaheb Kirloskar
- Sai Ranade as Janaki Dharma Deshmukh / Janaki Jaysingh Kirloskar
- Abhijeet Kelkar / Ketan Kshirsagar as Jaysingh Bhaiyyasaheb Kirloskar
- Sandhya Mhatre as Kalindi Bhaiyyasaheb Kirloskar

Neha's family

- Ashwini Ekbote as Kaveri Sudhir Jaykar / Kaveri Sadanand Phule
- Girish Pardeshi as Kunal Pratap Jaykar (Raja)
- Bal Karve as Ananda Jaykar (Aaba)
- Prasanna Ketkar as Sudhir Pratap Jaykar
- Seema Deshmukh as Rukmini Sudhir Jaykar
- Chinmay Kulkarni as Surya Sudhir Jaykar

Others

- Sharad Ponkshe as Dharma Deshmukh
- Jayant Savarkar as Ranga Dalvi
- Satish Joshi as Nana Joshi / Madhav Shinde
- Vijay Mishra as Sadanand Phule
- Avinash Narkar as Shrikant Dalvi
- Lokesh Gupte as Naresh Dalvi
- Anand Kale as Vikram Gadkari
- Shilpa Navalkar as Diksha Vikram Gadkari
- Shantanu Moghe as Sumedh Mujumdar
- Kashyap Parulekar as Abhay Bhosale
- Vrishasen Dabholkar as Dinesh Vasant Kulkarni
- Satish Suryavanshi as Bhushan Vasant Kulkarni
- Kirti Pendharkar as Sushama Bhushan Kulkarni
- Suhas Bhalekar as Vasant Kulkarni
- Manasi Magikar as Pramila Tilak
- Prajakta Kelkar as Sayali Tilak
- Uday Nene as Siddharth Tilak
- Sunil Godbole as Dr. Agnihotri
- Atul Mahajan as Dr. Gadkari
- Sunil Tawde as Ganga
- Anil Gawas as Nanda
- Pournima Ahire as Bayo
- Jyotsna Das as Ahilya
- Ramesh Chandane as Dadu
- Prakash Bhagwat as Sadashiv
- Gauri Jadhav as Bhingari
- Arun Bhadsavale as Rustam
- Nisha Parulekar as Jui
- Rajashri Nikam as Ranjana
- Ashok Shinde as Bhavani Shankar
- Rohini Hattangadi as Shalini Bhosale
- Rupali Bhosale as Charu Deshmukh
- Samidha Guru as Sweety
- Abhijeet Chavan
- Vishakha Subhedar
- Pratibha Goregaonkar
- Sanjay Kshemkalyani
- Vasudha Deshpande
- Amruta Raorane
- Smita Saravade
- Gururaj Avdhani
- Shama Ninawe
- Vivek Joshi
- Rama Joshi

== Awards ==
Zee Marathi Utsav Natyancha Awards
Year	Category	Recipient	Role
2007	Best Supporting Female	Rugvedi Pradhan	Neha Kirolskar
2008	Best Actress	Bhargavi Chirmule	Bhairavi Kirloskar

== Reception ==
Week	Year	TAM TVR	Rank		Ref.
Week	Year	TAM TVR	Mah/Goa	All India	Ref.
Week 47	2008	0.7	6	89	
Week 3	2009	0.89	5	89	
