= Boss Majhi Ladachi =

Marathi-language drama TV series

- Genre: Drama
- Written by: Madhugandha Kulkarni
- Starring: See below
- Country of origin: India
- Original language: Marathi
- No. of episodes: 182

Production
- Producer: Manava Naik
- Production locations: Mumbai, Maharashtra, India
- Camera setup: Multi-camera
- Running time: 22 minutes
- Production company: Strawberry Pictures

Original release
- Network: Sony Marathi
- Release: 28 February – 24 September 2022

Boss Majhi Ladachi (transl. My Beloved Boss) is an Indian Marathi-language drama series which aired on Sony Marathi. It starred Aayush Sanjeev and Bhagyashree Limaye in lead roles. It is produced by Manava Naik under the banner of Strawberry Pictures. It premiered from 28 February 2022 by replacing Tumchya Aamchyatali Kusum and ended on 24 September 2022.

== Plot ==
It is a love story between a Boss and her Employee. Rajeshwari Harshe, The MD of Kutumb (transl. Family) Constructions, is strict and unapologetic by nature due to her traumatic past. She has childhood trauma which made her hate family and has strict rules against people with big families working under her. The only family members she has are her two aunts who saved her and her Cat named Thaku whom she loves dearly. Mihir Manjrekar, an Architect by profession is working in her company, and dreams of running his own company one day. Mihir is allergic to Cats and belongs to a big, happy family who respect women. His family has a matriarchal dynamic and Mihir himself respects strong and opinionated women just like his grandmother and his boss Rajeshwari, but he had to lie to get a job in Kutumb Constructions, one of the top companies in the City, so that he could he could fulfill his father's dreams who unfortunately self harmed, which traumatised the whole family and they were against him going to the city and hence he got a deadline. Due to a clause in her father's will, Rajeshwari has to marry before she turns 30. Unfortunately for her, her toxic aunt and uncle get released from jail early for good behavior and the same day, all her nightmares come face to face. She struggles to find a suitable candidate for marriage, until she spots Mihir, who according to her, lives alone with no family and also wants to form his own company. After promising him his own Architectural Firm and Mihir being skeptical at first but realising his deadline agrees, Rajeshwari and Mihir decide to Marry each other, Only for her to uncover the numerous lies told by Mihir, on their engagement day. With no other option left, Rajeshwari plays along and pretends to be happily married to Mihir in front of his family, only to later realise that she has fallen in love with his Family. During their contract based marriage, A lot of problems arise, like the Manjrekar family head, Aau suspecting them of foul play, Rajeshwari's PA who is in love with Mihir tries to expose them and a village girl who is obsessed with Mihir and wants to marry him, The Uncle and Aunt trying hard to expose them. Mihir who gets to know about Rajeshwari's past, falls in love with her and tries to make her realise that she feels the same. Rajeshwari who never had a friend struggles to realise her love for him and think of it as friendship, meanwhile his Family gets to know the truth and are heartbroken. The series ends with Rajeshwari realising her love for Mihir and coming back to the Manjrekar Family.

== Cast ==
- Bhagyashree Limaye as Rajeshwari Harshe
- Ayush Sanjeev as Mihir Manjrekar
- Girish Oak
- Rohini Hattangadi
- Varsha Dandale
- Shalaka Pawar
- Nilesh Shevde
- Meena Naik
- Madhavi Juvekar
- Vaibhav Belsare
- Yashashri Upasani
- Vandana Bhosale
- Nikhil Kanitkar
- Pratham Deshpande
- Vrinda Ahire
- Tejas Barve
- Sonal Pawar
- Mahesh Joshi
- Seema Ghogale
- Amruta Toradmal
- Sachin Bondal
- Vidyadhar Paranjape
