= Sant Gajanan Shegaviche =

Indian devotional TV series

- Genre: Devotional
- Starring: See below
- Country of origin: India
- Original language: Marathi
- No. of episodes: 621

Production
- Producer: Tejendra Neswankar
- Production location: Mumbai
- Camera setup: Multi-camera
- Running time: 22 minutes
- Production company: Trrump Carrd Production

Original release
- Network: Sun Marathi
- Release: 17 October 2021 – 5 November 2023

Sant Gajanan Shegaviche (transl. Saint Gajanan of Shegavi) is an Indian Marathi language mytho series starring Amit Phatak as Saint Gajanan in lead role. It premiered on Sun Marathi from 17 October 2021. It is produced by Tejendra Neswankar under the banner of Trrump Carrd Production.

== Synopsis ==
Sant Gajanan Maharaj was a noble soul, legendary saint and mystic. Believed to be a reincarnation of Lord Ganesha & Lord Dattatreya, he has touched the lives of many with his spiritual power and wisdom.

== Cast ==
=== Main ===
- Amit Phatak as Saint Gajanan
  - Manoj Kolhatkar as elder Saint Gajanan

=== Recurring ===
- Mohan Joshi
- Anand Kale
- Nikhil Raut
- Pratiksha Jadhav
- Vikas Patil
- Vijay Kadam
- Sonali Patil
- Aatish More
- Rupal Nand
- Mangal Rane
- Gayatri Warungase
- Sarita Mehendale
- Hridaynath Jadhav
- Rohit Deshmukh
- Nimish Kulkarni
- Savita Malpekar
- Kishori Ambiye
- Shriram Pendse
- Parth Ghatge
- Jitendra Pol
- Akshay Tak
- Anand Kale
- Pooja Nayak
- Rajshri Nikam
- Mayur Khandge
- Sanjiv Tandel
- Divesh Medge
- Manjusha Godse
- Devendra Dodke
- Shekhar Phadke
- Janhavi Tambat

== Seasons ==
Season	Episodes	Originally Broadcast		Days
Season	Episodes	First aired	Last aired	Days
1	613	17 October 2021	12 August 2023	Mon-Sat
2	8	17 September 2023	5 November 2023	Sun (1hour)
