= Smita Thackeray =

Indian social activist and film producer

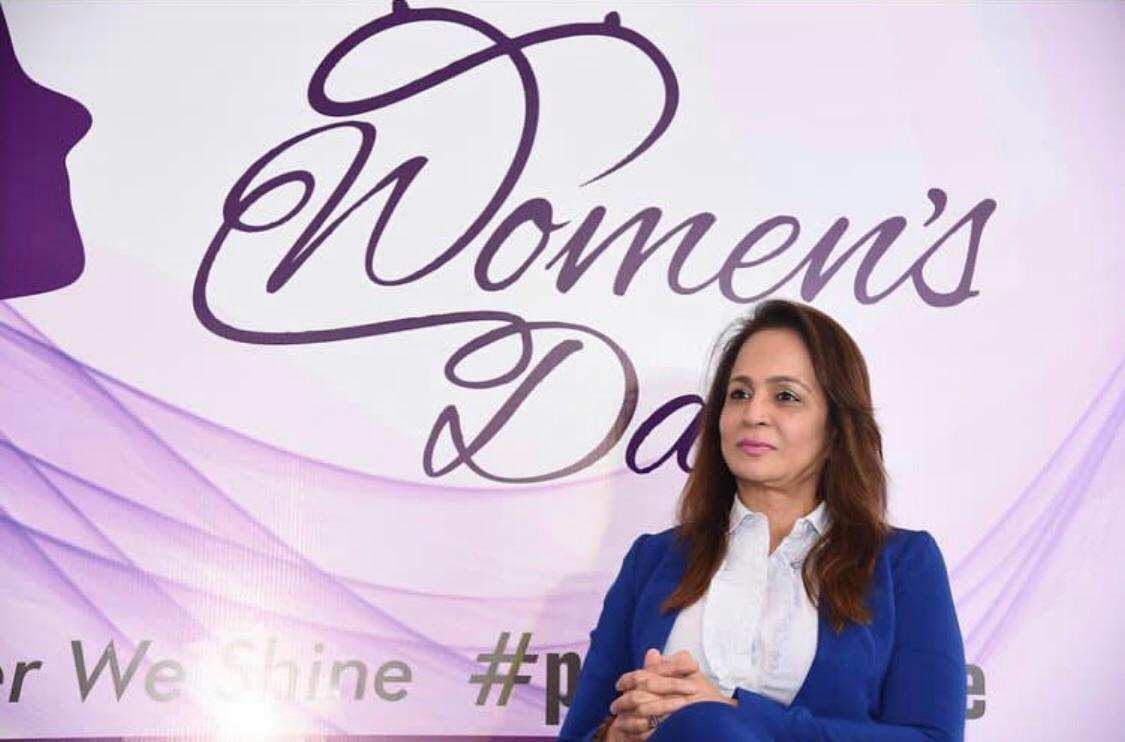
- Born: Mumbai, Maharashtra, India
- Occupation: Film producer
- Years active: 1997–present
- Spouse: Jaidev Thackeray (m. 1986; div. 2004)

Smita Thackeray is an Indian social activist and film producer. She is the chairperson and founder of Rahul Productions and Mukkti Foundation. She has worked in the field of Women's Safety, HIV/AIDS awareness and education. She made her motion picture debut in the 1999 Hindi-language comedy film Haseena Maan Jaayegi which was released in June 1999, grossing INR 27 crores worldwide. Since then she went on to work extensively in the Hindi and Marathi film and television industry.

== Early life ==
Smita Thackeray was born on 17 August 1958 to a middle-class Maharashtrian family in Mumbai. Her parents are Madhukar Chitre and Kunda Chitre. She attended Chhabildas Girl's High School, Dadar. As a child, she was trained in Marathi Classical singing. She completed her Bachelor's in Science (BSc) with Honors from Ruparel College, Mumbai, with Genetics as a major.

== Career ==
Thackeray first worked at the Centuar Hotel where she handled administrative and managerial tasks for a small stipend. Her interest in fashion translated to NARI boutique. She went on to be the founder and chairperson of Mukkti Foundation in 1997. She is the owner of Rahul Productions. She was the President of the Indian Motion Picture Producers Association (IMPPA) from 2001 to 2003. During her time in IMPPA, she started conversations around piracy and redistribution of media, specifically concerning ethical screening of films and content on television and other media post-release.

=== Philanthropy through Mukkti Foundation ===
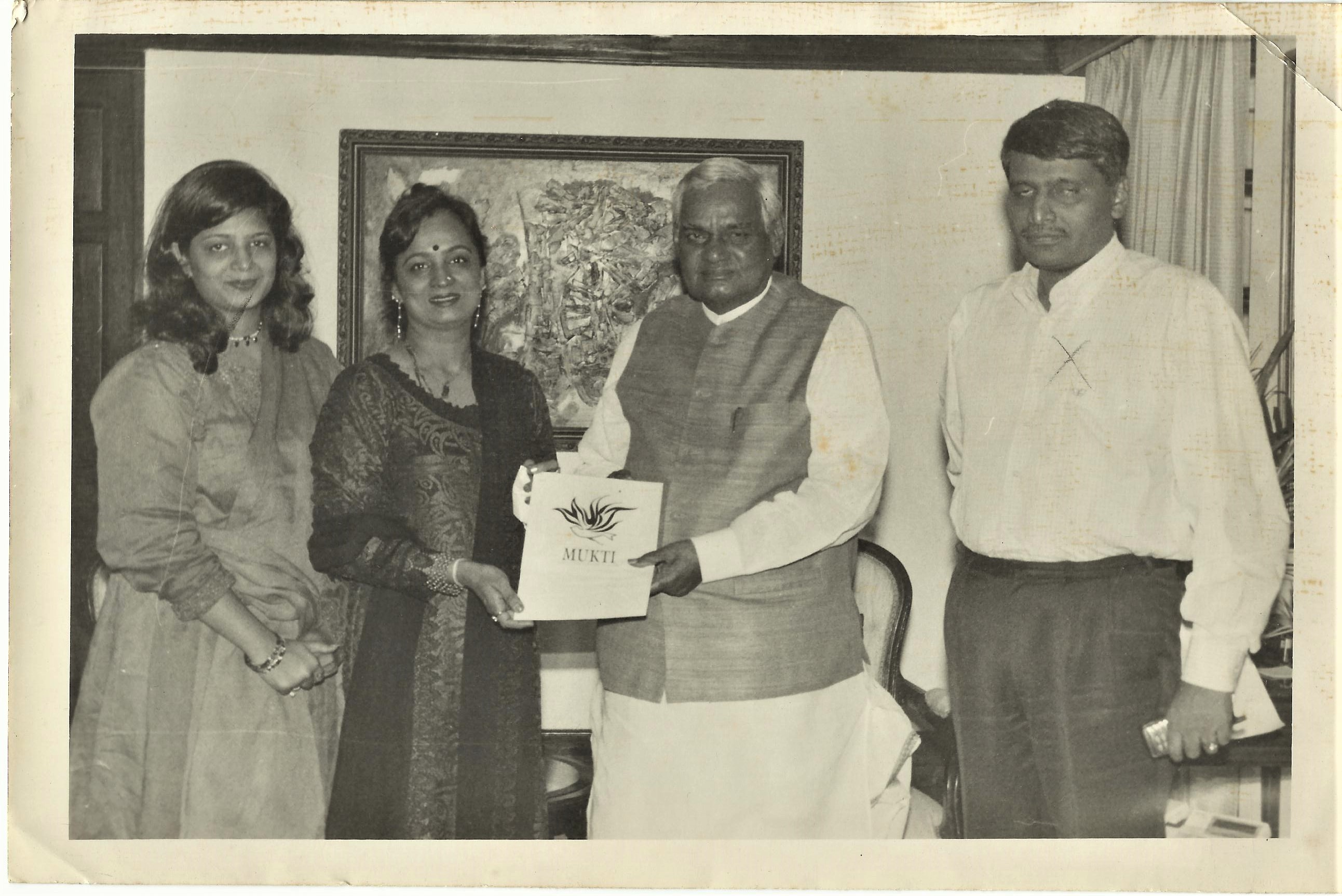
Hon' Prime Minister Atal Bihari Vajpayee receives a cheque from Smita Thackeray for drought victims of Rajasthan and Gujarat.

Smita Thackeray's aim in setting up Mukkti Foundation was to raise awareness about HIV and AIDS and to abate youth drug abuse. From July 1999 to May 2000, Mukkti raised funds for its various causes through celebrity cricket and football matches. INR 5 lakhs was contributed for the Gujarat cyclone relief fund (1998), INR 50 lakhs was contributed for bereaved Indian soldiers of the Kargil War, INR 41 lakhs was contributed for the drought victims of Rajasthan and Gujarat. Between 1998 and 2008, Mukkti Foundation hosted its annual AIDS show to celebrate "World AIDS Day," where film stars and other celebrities would make appearances to spread the message of AIDS awareness.

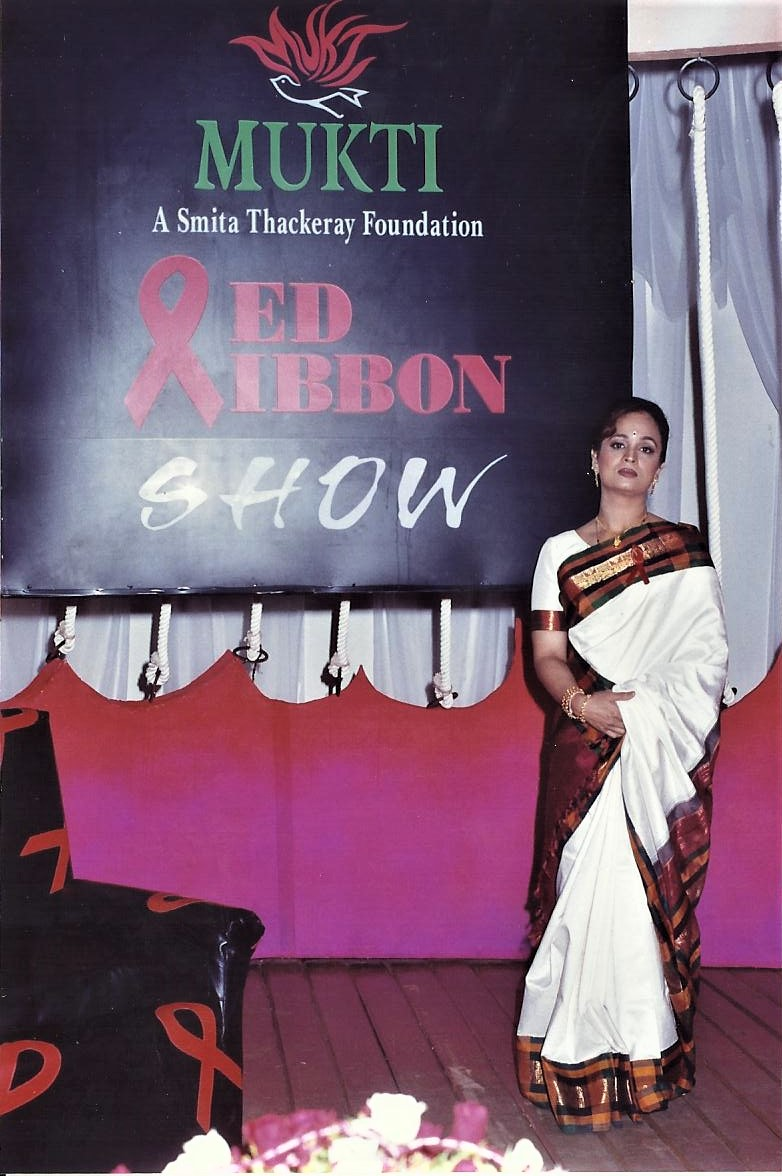
Smita Thackeray on the Set of the Red Ribbon Show

The effort to humanize HIV-affected individuals led to a 13-episode television chat show hosted by Sonu Nigam in November 2000. In 2003, three public service announcements were produced starring celebrities such as Amitabh Bachchan, Waheeda Rehman and Akshay Kumar. One-lakh pledges were collected in 2009 to support the cause of AIDS-free living under the campaign "I Pledge" with John Abraham. In December 2018, Smita Thackeray, along with stars Sunny Leone, Nisha Harale, Rohit Verma headed a "Freedom Parade" in solidarity with the LGBT community.

In 2014, Me Mukti Marshals, trained individuals to support Police and RPF were deployed in Mumbai trains at night to protect women travelling on local trains.

=== Presidency of IMPPA ===
Smita Thackeray in 2001 was elected as the first female president of Indian Motion Picture Producers' Association (IMPPA). At the time, video piracy was a major issue that was killing revenue for producers. She facilitated an MOU between film producers and cable TV associations in December 2001 that saved filmmakers INR 1 crore daily - an amount previously lost to producers due to illegal telecasting. For the first time in the history of IMPPA, a fundraiser was hosted by the association called Ehsaas 2002 to raise funds for medical and education centres for spot boys and light men. In 2004, Indian producers were invited to Switzerland by the Swiss consulate to promote film making and as a sign of welcome for Indian cinema workers by the Swiss President, Mr. Joseph Deiss.

== Awards and recognitions ==
- Indian Motion Picture Producers Association presented an Appreciation award at the 69th Annual General Meeting on 16 September 2008.
- LR Active Oil presented Women's Prerna Award for immense contribution in Social Service and Politics to India Society in 2013.
- HEX World presented the News Makers Achievement 2010 for social contribution

== Personal life ==
Smita Thackeray is the daughter of Madhukar Chitre and Kunda Chitre. She has two sisters, named Swati and Sushma. She grew up in a middle-class family in suburban Mumbai. She married Jaidev Thackeray, son of Bal Thackeray, in 1986 and divorced in 2004, though she continued to stay in her In-laws home 'Matoshree'. She has two sons, Rahul Thackeray her eldest and Aaishvary Thackeray her youngest. Rahul and Aishvary, graduated from American School of Bombay. Rahul went on to graduate from Toronto Film School and is currently a Marathi and Hindi film writer/director and filmmaker.

== Filmography ==
=== Films produced under Rahul Productions (1999-2017) ===
==== Hindi motion pictures ====
- Haseena Maan Jaayegi (1999)
- Sandwich (2006)
- Kaisay Kahein (2007)
- Society Kaam Se Gayi (2011)
- Hum Jo Keh Na Paaye (2005)

==== Hindi television shows ====
- Red Ribbon Show (1999) Star TV
- Khel (2000) Sony TV
- Kabhi Khushi Kabhi Dhoom (2004) Star Plus

==== Marathi television shows ====
- Jhep (ETV Marathi)
- Bhagyavidhatha (ETV Marathi)
- Vahinisaheb (Zee Marathi)
- Ya Sukhanno Ya (Zee Marathi)
- Kulaswamini (Star Prawah)
- Khel Mandla (Me Marathi)
- Paarijaat (Saam TV)
- Done Kinare Doghi Aapan (Star Prawah)

==== Marathi motion pictures ====
- R.A.A.D.A. Rocks (2011)

==== Magic Cloud Media & Entertainment (2006-2017) ====
- Krazzy 4 (2008)
- Bhoothnath (2008)
- Jaane Tu Ya Jaane Na (2008)
- Bachna Ae Haseeno (2008)
- Dostana (2008)
- Billu (2009)
- All The Best: Fun Begins (2009)
- 3 Idiots (2009)
- Zindagi Na Milegi Dobara (2011)
- Bodyguard (2011)
- Ra.One (2011)
- Housefull 2 (2012)
- Bol Bachchan (2012)
- OMG - Oh My God! (2012)
- Dabangg 2 (2012)
- Ugly (2013)
- Chennai Express (2013)
- Krrish 3 (2013)
- Bhoothnath Returns (2014)
- Fugly (2014)
- Hate Story 2 (2014)
- Happy New Year (2014)
- The Shaukeens (2014)
- Ungli (2014)
- Baby (2015)
- Roy (2015)
- Dil Dhadakne Do (2015)
- All Is Well (2015)
- Prem Ratan Dhan Payo (2015)
- Kaabil (2017)
- Begum Jaan (2017)
