= Shasan =

- Directed by: Gajendra Ahire
- Written by: Gajendra Ahire
- Produced by: Shekhar Pathak
- Starring: Makarand Anaspure; Bharat Jadhav; Jitendra Joshi; Manava Naik; Siddhartha Jadhav; Shriram Lagoo; Vikram Gokhale; Mohan Joshi; Vinay Apte; Nagesh Bhosle
- Production company: Shreya Films
- Release date: 15 January 2016
- Running time: 106 Minutes
- Country: India
- Language: Marathi

Shasan (transl. Government) is a 2016 Indian Marathi-language political drama film directed by Gajendra Ahire and produced by Shekhar Pathak under the banner of Shreya Films. The film stars Makarand Anaspure, Bharat Jadhav, Jitendra Joshi, Manava Naik, Siddhartha Jadhav, Shriram Lagoo, Vikram Gokhale, Mohan Joshi, Vinay Apte and Nagesh Bhosle. It was theatrically released on 15 January 2016.

== Cast ==
- Makarand Anaspure as Vishwas
- Bharat Jadhav as Jairaj Patil
- Jitendra Joshi Subhash Naigaonkar
- Manava Naik as Indrani
- Siddhartha Jadhav as Mahadev
- Shriram Lagoo as Vishwasrao Tidke
- Vrinda Gajendra as Vidya
- Vikram Gokhale
- Mohan Joshi
- Millind Shinde
- Vinay Apte as Anandrao
- Nagesh Bhosle
- Sudhir Dalvi
- Aditi Bhagwat as Sangeeta
- Amit Dattatray
- Jayant Sawarkar as Satyakam Master
- Kiran Karmarkar

== Critical response ==
Ganesh Matkari of Pune Mirror wrote "The film overflows with major actors, and most are entirely wasted. The cameo of Dr Lagoo as a politician of yesteryear, now redundant and ignored by the present crop, is the most disturbing as it seems to mock his status as one of our biggest and brightest actors". Jaydeep Pathak of Maharashtra Times wrote "Shasan movie portrays an individual mindset. It will make you want to watch the movie again and again".
