= Haseena Maan Jaayegi =

- Poster
- Directed by: David Dhawan
- Written by: Rumi Jaffery (Dialogues)
- Screenplay by: Imtiaz Patel; Yunus Sajawal
- Story by: Imtiaz Patel; Yunus Sajawal
- Based on: Kadhalikka Neramillai by C. V. Sridhar and Chitralaya Gopu
- Produced by: Smita Thackeray
- Starring: Sanjay Dutt; Govinda; Karisma Kapoor; Pooja Batra; Anupam Kher; Aruna Irani; Paresh Rawal; Kader Khan
- Narrated by: Bharat Shah
- Cinematography: K.S. Prakash Rao
- Edited by: A. Muthu
- Music by: Songs: Anu Malik; Background Music: Aadesh Shrivastav
- Production company: Rahul Productions
- Distributed by: Eros International
- Release date: 25 June 1999
- Running time: 156 minutes
- Country: India
- Language: Hindi

Haseena Maan Jaayegi (transl. The beauty will agree) is a 1999 Indian Hindi-language comedy film directed by David Dhawan. It stars Sanjay Dutt, Govinda, Karisma Kapoor and Pooja Batra, with Anupam Kher, Kader Khan, Aruna Irani, and Paresh Rawal in supporting. The film is thematically inspired by the 1966 film Pyar Kiye Jaa, which itself is a remake of the 1964 Tamil classic film Kadhalikka Neramillai. It was released on Karisma Kapoor's 25th birthday on the 25th of June in 1999, with a positive critical reception, and went on to become the fifth-highest-grossing Hindi film of 1999. It is often regarded amongst Govinda's greatest performances, and he won many awards for his role as Monu and Chachaji.

== Plot ==
Amirchand is the ill-fated father of two mischievous sons—Sonu and Monu. Both of them are always up to one prank or another, most of them aimed at stealing money from Amirchand.

In the opening scene, they call up their father, acting like gangsters, and ask for a huge sum if he wants to live. The plan fails as Amirchand turns out to be the driver of the taxi in which they were escaping. Later, they fix up the marriage of their father with Shakuntala and take one lakh rupees as advance dowry from her brother Jamnadas. This plan also fails as Amirchand refuses to entertain Jamnadas and his sister.

Amirchand warns their sons to become serious towards life if they want to live in his home. He asks Monu to join office and Sonu to go to Goa for claiming some money he had lent to someone. Whereas Monu plays another prank by calling up a girls' hostel and flirting with Ritu, Sonu mistakenly goes to one Gulzarilal Verma for claiming the money, where he meets Pooja. Both Ritu and Pooja are Gulzarilal's daughters.

Sonu and Monu fall in love with Pooja and Ritu, respectively. Sonu calls up Monu to come to Goa, disguised as his Uncle for fixing up his and Pooja's marriage. This leads to a series of confusions as Gulzarilal's sister Santho also falls in love with Monu (disguised as Uncle).

To get rid of the problem, Sonu and Monu throw a dummy of the Uncle from top of a cliff, only to land up getting arrested for killing the non-existent uncle. Amirchand learns of this and reaches Goa with his assistant Kunj Bihari. In favour of the story's and Sonu and Monu's fate, Amirchand and Gulzarilal turn out to be long lost friends. Together they set out towards the nearest police station when they get kidnapped by a Bhai. Sonu and Monu escape from the lockup with Bhootnath's help and rescue their father and father-in-law-to-be, thus proving to be worthy sons.

== Cast ==
- Sanjay Dutt as Sonu
- Govinda as Monu
- Karisma Kapoor as Ritu Verma
- Pooja Batra as Pooja Verma
- Kader Khan as Amirchand
- Paresh Rawal as Bhootnath
- Satish Kaushik as Kunj Bihari
- Aruna Irani as Santho Verma
- Anupam Kher as Gulzarilal Verma
- Ashish Vidyarthi as Bhai Kalra (gangster)
- Aasif Sheikh as Pritam Nath
- Razak Khan as Godbole, Bhai's henchman
- Mohan Joshi as Prem Nath
- Pushpa Verma as Premnath's wife
- Bindu as Shakuntala, (guest appearance)
- Asrani as Jamnadas, (guest appearance)
- Shakti Kapoor as himself
- Anil Dhawan as Police Commissioner KK
- Mahavir Shah as Goa's Police Inspector Arvind Sehgal

== Soundtrack ==
Haseena Maan Jayegi

Soundtrack album by Anu Malik & Background Music by Aadesh Shrivastava & Lyricist by Sameer
- Label: Tips Music

All lyrics are written by Sameer except one song by Nitin Raikwar; all music is composed by Anu Malik.

Songs
No.	Title	Playback	Length
1.	"Cheenti Pahad Chadhe"	Shankar Mahadevan, Hema Sardesai, Ehsaan	6:34
2.	"Dulha Bhi Lajawab Hai"	Ram Shankar, Sonu Nigam, Kavita Krishnamurthy	7:15
3.	"Haseena Maan Jaayegi"	Shankar Mahadevan, Ehsaan	4:11
4.	"I Love You Bol Daal"	Sanjay Dutt, Govinda, Alka Yagnik, Sonu Nigam, Sudesh Bhosale	6:40
5.	"Panga Na Le Mere Naal"	Sonu Nigam, Poornima	6:20
6.	"What Is Mobile Number"	Alka Yagnik, Sonu Nigam	6:10
7.	"Yoon Hua"	Alka Yagnik, Sonu Nigam	7:42

== Awards ==
45th Filmfare Awards:

Won

- Best Comedian – Govinda

Nominated

- Best Music Director – Anu Malik

1st IIFA Awards:

Nominated

- Best Actor – Govinda
- Best Supporting Actress – Aruna Irani
- Best Comedian – Anupam Kher
- Best Music Director – Anu Malik

== Sequel ==
In February 2026, it was reported that a sequel to the film is in development with Farhad Samji signed on to direct and Smita Thackeray as producer.

== See also ==
- List of Indian comedy films
- Jodi No. 1
- Ek Aur Ek Gyarah
