= Jivachi Hotiya Kahili =

Marathi-language drama TV series

- Genre: Drama
- Directed by: Aniket Sane
- Starring: See below
- Country of origin: India
- Original language: Marathi
- No. of episodes: 314

Production
- Producers: Subodh Khanolkar; Onkar Kate; Sujay Hande
- Production locations: Mumbai, Maharashtra, India
- Camera setup: Multi-camera
- Running time: 22 minutes
- Production company: Ocean Films Company

Original release
- Network: Sony Marathi
- Release: 18 July 2022 – 15 July 2023

Jivachi Hotiya Kahili is an Indian Marathi language drama series airing on Sony Marathi. It stars Raj Hanchnale and Pratiksha Shivankar in lead roles. It is produced by Subodh Khanolkar and directed by Aniket Sane under the banner of Ocean Films Company. It premiered from 18 July 2022 by replacing Swarajya Saudamini Tararani.

== Plot ==
Along the disputed border region of Maharashtra and Karnataka, forbidden love is brewing between Arjun, a Maharashtrian, and Revathi, a Kannadiga. The lovebirds belong to the two warring families in Chinchnoor with opposing political ideologies. When destiny casts the two families under the same roof, Arjun and Revathi must navigate their way towards each other.

== Cast ==
- Raj Hanchanale as Arjun
- Pratiksha Shiwankar as Revathi
- Vidyadhar Joshi / Pradeep Velankar as Aaba
- Atul Kale
- Achyut Potdar as Appa
- Bharati Patil
- Seema Deshmukh
- Gargi Ranade
- Shrutkirti Sawant
- Suyash Tilak
- Usha Naik
