= Premacha Game Same To Same =

Marathi-language TV series

- Genre: Drama
- Starring: See below
- Country of origin: India
- Original language: Marathi
- No. of episodes: 56

Production
- Camera setup: Multi-camera
- Running time: 22 minutes

Original release
- Network: Star Pravah
- Release: 27 January – 27 March 2020

Related
- Naam Iruvar Namakku Iruvar

Premacha Game Same To Same is an Indian Marathi language television series that aired on Star Pravah. It premiered on 27 January and ended on 27 March 2020, completing 56 episodes. It stars Sanchit Chaudhari, Sayali Jadhav and Prajakta Navnale in lead roles. It is an official remake of Tamil TV series Naam Iruvar Namakku Iruvar.

== Cast ==
- Sanchit Chaudhari as Dr. Arvind/ Digha
- Sayali Jadhav as Padma
- Prajakta Navnale as Ranjana
- Kamal Thoke
- Mahesh Bhosale
- Daya Eksambekar
- Laxmi Vibhute
- Pallavi Patwardhan
- Umesh Bolake
- Siddheshwar Zadbuke
- Balkrishna Shinde

== Adaptations ==
Language	Title	Original release	Network(s)	Last aired	Notes
Tamil	Naam Iruvar Namakku Iruvar நாம் இருவர் நமக்கு இருவர்	26 March 2018	Star Vijay	10 June 2022	Original
Marathi	Premacha Game Same To Same प्रेमाचा गेम सेम टू सेम	27 January 2020	Star Pravah	27 March 2020	Remake
