= Nandita Patkar =

Indian actress

- Born: 16 March 1982 (age 44); Pune, Maharashtra, India
- Occupation: Actress
- Years active: 2014–present
- Spouse: Vipul Mahagaonkar (m. 2026)

Nandita Patkar (born 16 March 1982) is an Indian actress, who appears in Marathi movies. She has appeared in Marathi films and TV serials. Her first film was Elizabeth Ekadashi released in 2014. For Her Performance in the film she received Nomination at Filmfare Awards Marathi in the category of Filmfare Award for Best Supporting Actress – Marathi.

== Early life ==
Nandita was born on 16 March 1982 in Pune, Maharashtra. She completed her bachelor's degree at D. G. Ruparel College of Arts, Science and Commerce.

== Career ==
Nandita started her career as RJ in All India Radio for Marathi programmes. She also worked as voice artist in various educational projects. After that, she joined theatre.

Nandita was made her first debut in the with film Elizabeth Ekadashi in 2014. She has made a significant mark in the Marathi film industry with roles in notable films like Khari Biscuit, Baba, Lalbaugchi Rani and Daaravtha. Renowned for her lead role as Laxmi in Zee Marathi's Majhe Pati Saubhagyawati and her contribution to Colors Marathi's Tu Majha Saangaati. Alongside her film career, Nandita has also showcased her talent in theatre productions, including performances in Baya Daar Ughad, Aranya Kiran, Amchya Hi’ch Prakaran and Var Khali Don Paay.

She is the Recipient of Zee Chitra Gaurav Puraskar for Best Supporting Actress for film Khari Biscuit.

She has appeared in the Marathi serial Sahkutumb Sahparivar on Star Pravah, where she played the character of Sarita. Now, she appears in film Panchak as Kaveri.

== Filmography ==
=== Films ===
Year	Title	Role	Ref.
2014	Elizabeth Ekadashi	Dnyanesh's mother	
2015	Pashbandh		
2015	Daaravtha	Vatsala Borkar	
2015	Rangaa Patangaa	Noor	
2016	Lalbaugchi Rani	Paaro	
2016	Kachru Mazha Bappa	Khirani	
2018	Ani... Dr. Kashinath Ghanekar	Dr. Irawati Ghanekar	
2019	Baba	Anandi	
2019	Khari Biscuit	Mai	
2022	Butter Chicken	Suman	
2022	Baalbhaarti	Sunita Desai	
2024	Panchak	Kaveri	
2025	Samsara	Doctor	

=== Television ===
Year	Title	Role	Ref.
2015-2016	Majhe Pati Saubhagyawati	Laxmi Malvankar	
2020-2023	Sahkutumb Sahparivar	Sarita More	
