= Eka Lagnachi Tisri Goshta =

Indian television series

- Genre: Drama; Romance; Comedy
- Directed by: Vinod Lavhekar
- Starring: See below
- Country of origin: India
- Original language: Marathi
- No. of episodes: 271

Production
- Producer: Shrirang Godbole
- Production locations: Pune, Mumbai
- Editor: Prathamesh Patkar
- Camera setup: Multi-camera
- Running time: 22 minutes
- Production company: Indian Magic Eye Pvt. Ltd. (IMEPL)

Original release
- Network: Zee Marathi
- Release: 14 October 2013 – 16 August 2014

Related
- Eka Lagnachi Dusri Goshta

Eka Lagnachi Tisri Goshta (transl. The Third Story of a Marriage) is an Indian Marathi language TV series which aired on Zee Marathi. It is a spin off from series Eka Lagnachi Dusri Goshta. It premiered from 14 October 2013 by replacing Tuza Maza Jamena. The show was dubbed in Hindi as Mile Sur Mera Tumhara which aired from 4 May 2015 on Zee TV.

== Plot ==
The show is a story of two young lawyers, Om and Isha, who fall in love. They have several things in common but one major difference is their family background. Isha's house is full of people while Om's parents divorced each other in his childhood and since then, he grew up on his own. Isha's grandfather, Mothe Baba, puts a condition to marry her in a house with a lot of people. This leads Om to arrange fake parents and siblings in his house, and he hides this from Isha too. One day, Isha finds out the reality and breaks up with him. She rejects all of Om's attempts to tell her the truth. His true love for her makes him depressed, and he resigns from his job.

From her friend, Isha learns the real intention behind Om's fake arrangement, and she accepts his love again. Now, the couple is reunited but still, the question is how to disclose this to Isha's family. Isha becomes part of the game and they continue to hide the reality from her family but Mothe Baba discovers the truth. Isha and Mothe Baba secretly strike a deal that she will bring Om's real parents back and reunite them in three months. This is kept a secret from everyone, including Om. Soon, Om's real parents, Ajit and Gauri, turn up in different circumstances. However, this also brings out Om's dark side as he disowns them completely due to the treatment he received from them since childhood. Ajit's current wife files a divorce case against him and claims all his properties which devastates him completely. Isha supports him, and with the help of Mothe Baba, Ajit wins his case; but this doesn't go down well with Om. Isha and Om's relationship suffers because of this but Isha continues her attempt to bring Om closer to his parents. Finally, Om and Isha marry each other in the attendance of both Om's real and fake parents.

== Cast ==
=== Main ===
- Umesh Kamat as Om Chaudhari
- Spruha Joshi as Isha Deshmukh

=== Recurring ===
- Tushar Dalvi as Ajit Chaudhari
- Mohan Joshi as Dattaram Newale (Datta Bhau)
- Shilpa Tulaskar as Gauri Panse-Chaudhari
- Sagar Talashilkar as Ranjeet Chaudhari
- Mohan Agashe as Prabhakar Deshmukh
- Rama Joshi as Isha's grandmother
- Shubhangi Gokhale as Shobhana
- Shubha Khote as Pramila Desai
- Sandesh Kulkarni as Jayesh
- Sneha Majgaonkar as Dhanashri
- Anita Date-Kelkar as Ashwini Ketkar
- Aarti Wadagbalkar as Madhu
- Sunil Abhyankar as Shrikant Bramhe
- Milind Phatak as Ulhas Pradhan
- Ajit Kelkar as Vasant Deshmukh
- Prasanna Ketkar as Satyajeet Chaudhari
- Anil Gawas as Shantaram Newale
- Rohit Haldikar as Sameer Chaudhari
- Sudeep Modak as Sagar
- Vishal Upasni as Om's office peon
- Kishor Kadam as Sushant
- Uma Sardeshmukh as Alka Deshmukh
- Uma Gokhale as Uma Deshmukh
- Ketaki Saraf as Deepa Deshmukh
- Ramesh Medhekar as Sadashiv Kamat
- Gautam Murudeshwar as Hemant Deshmukh
- Rutuja Bagwe as Aditi Deshmukh
