= Ashok Shinde =

Indian actor

- Born: 6 July 1961 (age 65); Mumbai, Maharashtra, India
- Occupations: Actor, Producer, Entertainer
- Spouse: Pooja Shinde

Ashok Shinde (born 6 July 1961) is an Indian film and stage actor, who works in Marathi cinema, known for films like Rangat Sangat. He has acted and produced Marathi film, making him one of the most successful actors in the Marathi film and television industry.

== Early life ==
Shinde was born in Pune, Maharashtra his father was a professional makeup artist. After finishing his engineering degree, he briefly worked at Telco for half a year. He dabbled in makeup artistry alongside his friend Vikram Gaikwad for a short period before transitioning to acting full-time in 1987.

== Career ==
Throughout his 27-year acting career, he has appeared in various roles on stage, TV, and in movies, playing heroes, villains, and anti-heroes. Currently, he has acted in 111 films, 106 TV shows, and 42 daily dramas on the Sahyadri Channel. Notably, he completed 1200 episodes of Swapnanchya Palikadle as Yashwant Patkar and stars in Lagori – Maitri Returns on Star Pravah. Additionally, he made a special appearance in Nana Patekar's film Yeshwant.

== Filmography ==
=== Films ===
Year	Title	Role	Notes
1988	Rangat Sangat	Om Prakash	Debut film
1988	Reshmigathi	Raja	
1989	Hamaal De Dhamaal	Inspector Ashok Shinde	
1990	Eka Peksha Ek	Vijay Kumar	
1991	Andhala Sakshidar	Inspector Abhay Kumar	
1991	Kal Ratri 12 Vajta	Hambirrao Inamdar	
1994	Mayechi Sawali	Arun Velankar	
1994	Sasar Maher	Rangrao Landage	
1994	Gharandaaz	Ashok	
1995	Sukhi Sansarachi 12 Sutre	Shekhar	
1995	Zakhmi Kunku	Namdeo	
1996	Ashi Asavi Sasu	Ram	
1997	Yeshwant	Chief Minister's son	Hindi film
1998	Shandhyug		
2002	Satyamev Jayate		
2003	Bhau Beej	Mansingh Yadav	
2004	Sakshatkar	Doctor Jeevanrao	
2004	Maza Ghar Tuza Sansar	Sagar	
2004	Ranragini	Suhas	
2004	Suvasinichi Hi Satwapariksha	Arun Kulkarni	
2005	Mee Tulas Tujhya Angani	Sunny	
2005	Aabhas	Ravi	
2005	Davbindu	Sagar Dixit	
2005	Hirva Shalu		
2005	The Indian Murli	Murli	
2005	Jay Adharbhuja Saptashrungi Mata	Shankar	
2006	Dil Se Pooch.. Kidhar Jaana Hai		Hindi film
2006	Devashappath Khote Sangen Khara Sangnar Nahi	Bhujangrao Wagh	
2006	Labad Kuthali	Hemant	
2006	Londoncha Jawai	Mahipat Rao	
2006	Aai Mala Maaf Kar	Raghunath	
2006	Bhau Majha Pathirakha	Gauri's father	
2006	Akhand Saubhagyawati		
2006	Zakhmi Police 302	Inspector Sanjay Nimbalkar	
2007	Mumbaiche Shahane	Nana	
2007	Aevdhese Aabhal	Shakun's husband	Zee Chitra Gaurav Puraskar for Best Actor Nominated
2008	Tujhya Majhya Sansarala Ani Kay Hava		
2008	Jeevan Ek Sangharsh	Prem Sawant	
2008	Mi Sansar Mandite	Chandrakant	
2009	Vijay Dinanath Chauhan	Vijay Dinanath Chauhan	
2009	Adhantari		
2009	Nirnay		
2010	Aaji Aani Naat	Sumeet	
2011	Mohan Aawatey	Aamdar	
2011	Superstar		
2011	Ashi Fasli Nanachi Tang	GL TV CEO	
2011	Janma	Nisha's doctor	
2013	Mandali Tumchyasathi Kay Pan	Mahesh	
2013	Vishesh Mhanje Hi Mazi Misses	Mister	
2015	Kaakan	Sudhamati's husband	
2016	Lalbaugchi Rani	Nitin Parulekar	
2017	Aadesh: The Power of Law	Lawyer	
2019	Menaka Urvashi	Mr. Patil	
2022	Chandramukhi	Shahir Umajirao Junnarkar	
2022	Har Har Mahadev	Phulaji Prabhu Deshpande	
2026	Swapnasundari	Raghav's father	

=== Television ===
Year	Title	Role	Channel	Notes
1989	Hello Inspector	Inspector	DD Sahyadri	
1997-2001	Damini	Damini's husband	DD Sahyadri	
1998-1999	Pimpalpaan		DD Sahyadri	
1998	Teesra Dola	Rohit	DD Sahyadri	
2004	Saripat Ha Sansaracha		DD Sahyadri	
2004	Colonel Chanakya	Chankaya	DD Sahyadri	
2006	Gharkul	Supporting role	DD Sahyadri	
2006	Oon Paaus	Ashok	Zee Marathi	
2007	Avaghachi Sansar	Recurring role	Zee Marathi	
2007	Asambhav	Bhalchandra	Zee Marathi	
2011-2013	Swapnanchya Palikadle	Yashwant Patkar	Star Pravah	
2014-2015	Lagori – Maitri Returns	Dhanashri's father	Star Pravah	
2015-2016	Majhe Pati Saubhagyawati	Ajinkya	Zee Marathi	
2018-2019	Chhatriwali	Suryakant Gaikwad	Star Pravah	
2021-2023	Swabhiman – Shodh Astitvacha	Prabhakar Suryavanshi	Star Pravah	
2023–2024	Saara Kahi Tichyasathi	Raghunath Khot	Zee Marathi	
2026–present	Suna Yeti Ghara	Shivnath	Star Pravah	
