= Gorintaku =

Gorintaku (lit. 'Mehndi' or 'Henna') may refer to:

- Gorintaku (1979 film), an Indian Telugu-language film directed by Dasari Narayana Rao
- Gorintaku (2008 film), an Indian Telugu-language film directed by V. R. Prathap
- Gorintaku (TV series), an Indian Telugu-language television series broadcast by Star Maa

== See also ==
- Mehndi (disambiguation)
- Henna (disambiguation)
