= Swarajya Saudamini Tararani =

Marathi-language historical TV series

- Genre: Historical
- Directed by: Kartik Kendhe
- Starring: See below
- Country of origin: India
- Original language: Marathi
- No. of episodes: 221

Production
- Producer: Amol Kolhe
- Production locations: Mumbai, Maharashtra, India
- Camera setup: Multi-camera
- Running time: 22 minutes
- Production company: Jagdamb Production

Original release
- Network: Sony Marathi
- Release: 15 November 2021 – 16 July 2022

Related
- Swarajyajanani Jijamata

Swarajya Saudamini Tararani is an Indian Marathi language historical TV series which aired on Sony Marathi. It starred Swarda Thigale as Tararani in lead role. It is directed by Kartik Kendhe and produced by Amol Kolhe under the banner of Jagdamb Production. It premiered from 15 November 2021 and ended on 16 July 2022 completing 221 episodes.

== Plot ==
After the death of Chhatrapati Shivaji and the killing of Chhatrapati Sambhaji, Aurangzeb seized the opportunity to demolish the Maratha Empire, but Tararani pledged to Swaraj to finish Aurangzeb and took the reins of the dwindling empire in her hands as the wife of Chhatrapati Shivaji's youngest son, Rajaram. Though her path was full of obstacles, she rose like a phoenix and resurrected from the ashes. She regrouped various factions of the Maratha army. Like a coveted general, she guided two brave generals, Santaji Ghorpade and Dhanaji Jadhav in a series of battles against Aurangzeb. In a period of seven years, Tararani defeated most of the Mughal generals to recapture the major portion of the Maratha Empire. Aurangzeb realized that he was fighting a losing battle. Aurangzeb – who came down to Dakkhan with a vow to crush the Marathas – finally died in Dakkhan. Warrior queen Tararani fulfilled her pledge. She upheld the glory and power of the saffron flag like never before.

== Cast ==
- Swarda Thigale as Maratha Empress Tarabai
- Yatin Karyekar as Mughal Emperor Aurangzeb
- Amol Kolhe as Chhatrapati Shivaji Maharaj (Cameo)
- Sangram Samel as Chhatrapati Rajaram
- Rohit Deshmukh
- Amit Deshmukh
- Dipti Bhagwat as Yesubai Bhonsale
- Ravindra Kulkarni
- Anand Kale as Hambirrao Mohite
- Kiran Dange
- Krushna Rajshekhar as Jankibai
- Anant Jog
- Apurva Nemlekar as Keladi Chennamma
