= Eka Lagnachi Dusri Goshta =

Indian Marathi language TV series

- Genre: Drama
- Created by: Shrirang Godbole
- Written by: Shrirang Godbole
- Screenplay by: Chinmay Mandlekar
- Directed by: Vinod Lavhekar
- Creative director: Ajit Dandekar
- Starring: See below
- Theme music composer: Kaushal Inamdar
- Country of origin: India
- Original language: Marathi
- No. of episodes: 192

Production
- Executive producer: Nikhil Sheth
- Producer: Shrirang Godbole
- Cinematography: Deepak Anjaria
- Editor: Prathamesh Patkar
- Camera setup: Multi-camera
- Running time: 22 minutes
- Production company: Indian Magic Eye Pvt. Ltd.

Original release
- Network: Zee Marathi
- Release: 16 January – 25 August 2012

Related
- Eka Lagnachi Tisri Goshta

Eka Lagnachi Dusri Goshta (transl. The second story of a marriage) is an Indian Marathi language TV series which aired on Zee Marathi. It premiered from 16 January 2012 by replacing Guntata Hriday He. It ended on 25 August 2012 completing 192 episodes. The show starred Mukta Barve and Swapnil Joshi in lead roles. Its franchise Eka Lagnachi Tisri Goshta starring Spruha Joshi and Umesh Kamat began airing in 2013.

== Plot ==
The show is the story of a boy and a girl with a very different approach towards their life and career. The boy, Ghanashyam Kale dreams the American Dream, and desperately wants to shift to the USA. The girl, Radha Desai, works in an advertising agency and lives with her father, a single parent.

Radha and Ghana have their individual goals in life and don't wish to get married. However, both the Kale and the Desai families pressure them to get married as soon as possible because of their age. Due to this relentless pressure from their families, Radha and Ghanashyam take the unusual decision of a Contract Marriage.

Radha and Ghana reluctantly agree to marry with a secret agreement that they will divorce each other over a year. Radha is initially uncomfortable living with a joint family, but gets accustomed to it soon. The serial chronicles the couple's attempts to hide their true decision from their family. In an unusual turn of events, Radha and Ghana develop feelings for one other. Ghana's grandmother learns of their intentions and introduces a new boy, Abhir, in their lives.

Ghanashyam's efforts to emigrate to the US fail. Abhir falls for Radha, but she in turn longs for her husband. Abhir leaves, and Radha confesses her love for Ghanashyam, and tells him that she doesn't want a divorce. The latter spurns her and reminds her of her contract. It is revealed that Ghana had unrequited love for his deceased childhood friend and wants to go to the US for her sake.

Towards the end, Ghanashyam nearly succeeds in getting into America, but is rejected because he is married. Ghanashyam tells his boss that he is getting divorced, but realizes that he was hurting his family for his personal gain. While going to the U.S. is still his dream, Ghanashyam chooses to stay with his wife and family.

Ghanashyam decides to resign, but his boss is impressed and offers him the same package in India, which he accepts. Ghanashyam reconciles and apologizes to his wife and family. The serial ends with the couple going abroad for their honeymoon.

== Cast ==
=== Main ===
- Mukta Barve as Radha Mahesh Desai / Radha Ghanashyam Kale
- Swapnil Joshi as Ghanashyam Kale (Ghana)

=== Recurring ===
- Umesh Kamat as Abir Ranade, Paying guest at Desai family
- Vinay Apte as Mahesh Desai, Radha's father
- Sukanya Kulkarni as Prachi, Mahesh's sister
- Mohan Joshi as Shripad Kale
  - Vivek Lagoo replaced Mohan as Shripad Kale
- Rekha Kamat as Ghana's grandmother (Mai)
- Satish Tare as Mauli, Kale Family's Servant
- Akshata Bhole as Pari, Grandmother's Care Taker
- Rishikesh Joshi as Avinash Sonawane, Radha's boss
- Shridhar Limaye as Angad Kashyap, Ghana's boss
- Ila Bhate as Devaki Kale, Ghana's mother
- Milind Phatak as Vallabh Kale, Ghana's uncle
- Manjusha Godse as Vallari, Vallabh's wife
- Spruha Joshi as Kuhu, Vallabh and Vallari's daughter
- Shrikar Pitre as Prabhat, Kuhu's love interest
- Mohit Gokhale as Dhyanesh (Dnyana), Vallabh and Vallari's son
- Sunil Abhyankar as Digambar Kale (Digya), Ghana's uncle
- Leena Bhagwat as Supriya Kale, Digambar's wife
- Parharsh Naik as Ganga Kale, Digambar and Supriya's son
- Asawari Joshi as Ulka
- Sandeep Pathak as Manav Gokhale, Radha's colleague
- Prajakta Hanamghar as Sonia, Radha's colleague
- Girish Joshi as Vinod Kaka, Ulka's ex-husband
- Samir Choughule as Sameer, Ghana's colleague friend
- Sarita Mehendale-Joshi as Sumukhi, Supriya Kale's Niece

== Reception ==
Zee Marathi converted the series into a mini film and aired it on 20 January 2013 in memory of the show, the mini film was known as ELDG-Cinematic.

== Adaptations ==
Language	Title	Original release	Network(s)	Last aired	Notes
Hindi	Chupke Chupke चुपके चुपके	8 May 2017	And TV	15 September 2017	Remake
