= Molkarin Bai – Mothi Tichi Savali =

Marathi language drama television series

- Genre: Family drama
- Directed by: Vaibhav Chinchalkar
- Starring: See below
- Theme music composer: Ashok Patki
- Opening theme: Urmila Dhangar
- Country of origin: India
- Original language: Marathi
- No. of episodes: 349

Production
- Producer: Tejendra Neswankar
- Camera setup: Multi-camera
- Running time: 22 minutes
- Production company: Trrump Carrd Production

Original release
- Network: Star Pravah
- Release: 25 March 2019 – 21 August 2020

Molkarin Bai – Mothi Tichi Savali (transl. The Maid – Her Big Shadow) is an Indian Marathi-language television drama series that premiered on 25 March 2019 on Star Pravah. It stars Usha Nadkarni, Sarika Nilatkar and Supriya Pathare in lead roles. The show is produced by Tejendra Neswankar and directed by Vaibhav Chinchalkar under the banner of Trrump Carrd Production.

== Plot ==
The story is a heartwarming story of four maids, Durga, Anita, Ambika and Gunjan. It shows Life from their perspective, they suffer the most and celebrate the most.

== Cast ==
=== Main ===
- Usha Nadkarni as Durga
- Supriya Pathare as Ambika Tukaram Kamble
- Sarika Nawathe as Anita Anil Shinde
- Ashwini Kasar as Gunjan

=== Recurring ===
- Bhargavi Chirmule as Mukta
- Pratiksha Jadhav as Ranjana
- Monika Dabade as Manasi
- Siddhesh Prabhakar
- Atul Aagalaavey as Ritik Anil Shinde
- Atul Kasva as Tukaram Kamble
- Sanika Gadgil as Nisha Tukaram Kamble
- Amey Borkar as Satya Tukaram Kamble
- Tanvi Barve as Priyanka Anil Shinde
- Shreyas Raje/Bipin Surve as Vihan / Sagar
- Gayatri Soham as Aditi Pradhan
- Rajshri Nikam
- Surabhi Damle
- Sandesh Jadhav as Anil Shinde
- Swati Bowalekar as Aajji
- Ruturaj Phadke

== Reception ==
=== Ratings ===
Week	Year	BARC Viewership		Ref.
Week	Year	TRP	Rank	Ref.
Week 29	2020	2.1	4	
