= Bhargavi Chirmule =

Indian film actress

Bhargavi Chirmuley
- Born: 29 March 1978 (age 48); Mumbai, Maharashtra, India
- Occupation: Actress
- Years active: 1994–present
- Spouse: Pankaj Ekbote (m. 2012; div. 2015)

Bhargavi Chirmule is a Marathi actress. She has worked in many Marathi movies and television serials. She also worked in the reality show Fu Bai Fu.

== Early life and education ==
Bhargavi was born to Shirish and Sai Chirmuley. She was brought up in Mumbai-Girgaon. Later her family moved to Dadar. She completed her school in Raja Shivaji Vidyalaya. She is a graduate from Ruparel College (Mumbai). She has learnt classical dance form "Bharat Natyam". She is also a yoga therapist. She has younger sister Chaitrali (actress who is wife of actor Lokesh Gupte). In 2015, she had her 2nd divorce.

== Career ==
Chirmule started working in small plays and dramas when she was doing graduation in Ruparel. She got her first movie break in Vishwa Vinayak. In 2010, she worked with big Marathi actors like Sachin (actor) Pilgaonkar, Mahesh Kothare and Ashok Saraf in the movie Ideachi Kalpana. She says "I would like to be known as actress rather than star." Chirmule participated and won the reality show Eka Peksha Ek (Celebrity Parv), hosted by Adesh Bandekar and judged by Sachin (actor). She also joined the show on 20 April 2011 Eka Peksha Ek (Apsara Aali) as a guest. In 2011, she worked with Bharat Jadhav in the movie One Room Kitchen, in which she played a middle-class housewife, who is living in a chawl, but dreaming about having a flat in a suburban area of Mumbai. In 2012, she played in a drama named Zopi Gelela Jag Zala. Currently, she is doing the sitcom Suvasini, which telecasts on Star Pravah. She also played Queen Sunayna, mother of Sita in the TV serial Siya ke Ram, aired on Star Plus.

== Filmography ==
=== Films ===
Year	Title	Role
1994	T. K. Patil	Cameo appearance
1994	Vishwavinayak	Dagdu's daughter
2010	Ideachi Kalpana	Preeti Thakur
2010	Kass	Arundhati Modak
2011	One Room Kitchen	Suman
2012	Dhagedore	Advocate Tejas
2012	Gola Berij	Indu Welankar
2013	Navra Maza Bhavra	Special appearance
2013	Sasu Cha Swayamwar	Special appearance
2014	Ishq Wala Love	Ajinkya's relative
2015	Sandook	Rukmini Ashtaputre
2017	Oli Ki Suki	Cameo appearance
2018	Hichyasathi Kay Pan	Lead role
2022	Gulhar	Lead role
2024	Lokshahi	Suhasini
2024	Dharmarakshak Mahaveer Chhatrapati Sambhaji Maharaj: Part 1	Dharau Mata
2025	Jarann	Special appearance in dance number

=== Television ===
Year	Title	Role	Ref.
1999	Aanandi Gopal	Anandi Gopal Joshi	
1999-2002	Prapanch	Bhargavi Deshmukh	
2003	Char Divas Sasuche	Cameo appearance	
2006-2009	Vahinisaheb	Bhairavi Kirloskar	
2009	Asambhav	Namita Pradhan	
2009-2010	Anubandh	Namita Pradhan	
2009-2010	Bhagyavidhata	Cameo appearance	
2010-2011	Shrimant Gangadhar Pant	Gangadhar's wife	
2010-2011	Rakt Sambandh	Savita Patil	
2011	Pinjara	Lavani Dancer	
2011	Fu Bai Fu	Contestant	
2011	Eka Peksha Ek	Contestant (Winner)	
2012	Suvasini	Savitri	
2015-2016	Siya Ke Ram	Sunaina	
2017	Jaago Mohan Pyare	Mohan's boss	
2018	Swarajyarakshak Sambhaji	Special appearance in song "Jijauchya Muli"	
2019-2020	Molkarin Bai – Mothi Tichi Savali	Mukta	
2019-2020	Swarajyajanani Jijamata	Jijabai	
2021	Mere Sai – Shraddha Aur Saburi	Chandra	
2021	Bigg Boss Marathi season 3	Special appearance	
2021-2022	Aai – Mayech Kavach	Meenakshi	
2025	Tarini	Vasudha Belsare	
2026	Marathi Medium	Vishakha Shikhare	

== Drama/theatre ==
1. Himalayachi Savali
2. Zopi Gelela Jaga Zala
