= Vinay Apte =

Marathi actor

- Born: 17 June 1951; Bombay, Bombay State, India
- Died: 7 December 2013 (aged 62); Mumbai, Maharashtra, India
- Known for: Actor, Director, Playwright, Producer, Television Presenter
- Spouse: Vaijayanti Apte

Vinay Apte (17 June 1951 – 7 December 2013) was an Indian film and television actor. He acted in several Marathi movies and television shows in his almost 40-year-old career. He has also acted in Hindi movies such as Chandni Bar, Ek Chalis Ki Last Local, It's Breaking News, Satyagraha and Rajneeti.

== Career ==
Apte began his acting career in 1974 in Marathi theatre and gradually began directing Marathi plays. His first play Mitrachi Goshta (Friend's Story) was written by well known Marathi playwright Vijay Tendulkar. Me Nathuram Godse Boltoy, a play directed by Vinay Apte, had been the target of heavy political controversy. He appeared in several TV serials such as Lajja and Eka Lagnachi Dusri Goshta. He also appeared in several Bollywood films like Dhamaal, Aarakshan, Gangajal and Rajneeti. He was one of the leading actors in Marathi cinema, dramas and serials.

Apart from acting he was associated with a production house.

== Death ==
He died in Mumbai on 7 December 2013.

== Filmography ==
- Aakrosh (1980)
- Kalyug (1981) - Mhatre
- Gandhi (1982) - Hindu Youth in Calcutta street #2
- Bombay War (1990)
- In India Today (1991)
- Nishpaap (1992) - Anna Khalbhor
- Hach Sunbaicha Bahu (1992) - Malharrao Kolshe
- Ladhaai (1999) - Dr. S.M Shinde
- Chandni Bar (2001) - Inspector Gaikwad
- Saathiya (2002) - Senior inspector
- Kyon? (2003) - DSP Manohar Shinde
- Police Force: An Inside Story (2004) - Sawant
- Khabardaar (2005)
- Corporate (2006) - State Finance Minister Gulabrao Ingle
- Aai Shappath..! (2006) - Devki's father-in-law
- Karz Kunkavache (2007)
- Brinda (2007)
- Ek Chalis Ki Last Local (2007) - Ponnappa
- Dhamaal (2007) - Prabhakarana Sripalawardhana Atapattu Jayasuriya Laxmana Shivramakrishna Shivavenkata Rajashekhara Srinivasana Tiruchirappalli Yekyaparampeel Perumbudur Chinnaswami Mutthuswami Venugopal Iyer
- It's Breaking News (2007) - DIG Dandekar
- Vighnaharta Shri Siddhi Vinayak (2007)
- Checkmate (2008) - Sampatrao Mahabal
- Pranali: The Tradition (2008) - Keshav Prasad
- Dashavatar (2008) - Kansa
- C Kkompany (2008) - Inspector Jawle
- Foreignchi Patlin (2008) - Sarpanch Balwantrao Patil (Tatya)
- Madhu Ithe Choughe Tithe (2008)
- Agnihotra (2009, TV Series) - Sadanand Rao
- Ek Da Kaay Zale Baiko Udali Bhurrr (2009)
- Nishani Dava Angatha (2009)
- Jogwa (2009) - Basappa
- Veer (2010) - Nanku
- Lalbaug Parel (2010) - Speedbreakers Father
- City of Gold - Mumbai 1982: Ek Ankahee Kahani (2010) - Govind Rahate
- Ranbhool (2010)
- Raajneeti (2010) - Babulal
- Sa Sasucha (2010) - Kartik's Father
- Target (2010) - Vishwasrao
- Paradh (2010) - Prataprao
- Mohaan Aawatey (2011) - Aamdar
- Taryanche Bait (2011)
- Aarakshan (2011) - Neta Bhishamber
- Arjun (2011) - Jay Thackray
- Hello Jai Hind! (2011)
- Yedyanchi Jatra (2012)
- Dhagedore (2012) - Advocate Bhalerao
- Badam Rani Gulam Chor (2012) - Politician
- Chakravyuh (2012) - Krishna Raj
- Bokad (2012)
- Mazha Mee (2013)
- Dham Dhoom (2013)
- Gulabi (2014) - Minister
- Gour Hari Dastaan (2015) - MLA Olwe
- Dhol Taashe (2015) - Deshmukh
- Aawhan (2015) - Chief Minister
- Shasan (2016) - Anand Rao
- Dhondi (2017) - Patil
- Total Dhamaal (2018) - Patil

== TV serials ==
- Lajja
- Manus
- Avantika
- Anamika
- Agnihotra
- Asmita
- Parijaat
- Bhagyalaxmi
- Laxmanresha
- Kya Baat Hai
- Gharaounda
- Ya Sukhanno Ya
- Bolachi Kadhi
- Raat Chanderi
- Bhagyavidhata
- Girid Interpol
- Mungeri Ke Bhai Naurangi Laal (Hindi)
- Aabhalmaya
- Eka Lagnachi Dusri Goshta
- Durva
- Vahinisaheb
- Adaalat (2011-2012, TV Series) - Meghraj Rane (Hindi)
- Eka Lagnachi Dusri Goshta (2012, Marathi Serial) - Mahesh Desai
- Madhubala – Ek Ishq Ek Junoon (2012, TV Series) as Shivdutt Marathe (Hindi)

== Plays ==
- Mee Nathuram Godse Boltoy – Director
- Mitrachi Goshta
- Just Another Rape – English
- Carry On Heaven – English
- Kamala – English
- Kabaddi Kabaddi
