= Chandravilas =

2023 Indian Marathi-language horror series

- Genre: Horror
- Written by: Sameer Garud; Prasad Ramakant Joshi
- Directed by: Amol Pathare
- Starring: See below
- Theme music composer: Pranav Haridas
- Opening theme: "Chandravilas" by Sunidhi Chauhan
- Country of origin: India
- Original language: Marathi
- No. of episodes: 84

Production
- Production locations: Palghar, Maharashtra
- Camera setup: Multi-camera
- Running time: 22 minutes
- Production company: Circuit House Production

Original release
- Network: Zee Marathi
- Release: 27 March – 1 July 2023

Chandravilas is an Indian Marathi language horror TV series which aired on Zee Marathi. It premiered from 27 March and ended on 1 July 2023 completing 84 episodes. It starred Vaibhav Mangle, Sagar Deshmukh and Aabha Bodas in lead roles. It is directed by Amol Pathare under the banner of Circuit House Production.

== Plot ==
When Ananta and his 16-year-old daughter Sharvari visit their ancestral home, Chandravilas, the 200-year-old spirit of a lecherous Narhari Pant haunts Sharvari.

== Cast ==
=== Main ===
- Aabha Bodas as Sharvari
- Sagar Deshmukh as Anant
  - Inesh Kotian as Young Anant
- Vaibhav Mangle as Narhari

=== Recurring ===
- Dhananjay Sardeshpande as Nana
- Pooja Thombre as Tara
- Bhakti Desai as Vibhavari
- Anjali Jogalekar as Usha
- Prachiti Ahirrao as Nanda
- Purnanand Wandhekar as Shashikant
- Pallavi Divate as Ambika
