= Band Baja Varat =

Marathi talk show

- Genre: Game show Talk show
- Starring: Renuka Shahane; Mrunmayee Deshpande; Pushkaraj Chirputkar
- Country of origin: India
- Original language: Marathi
- No. of episodes: 39

Production
- Producer: Parth Shah
- Camera setup: Multi-camera
- Running time: 45 minutes
- Production company: Endemol Shine Group

Original release
- Network: Zee Marathi
- Release: 18 March – 24 July 2022

Band Baja Varat is an Indian television game and talk show in Marathi language originally aired on Zee Marathi. The show was hosted by Pushkaraj Chirputkar, Mrunmayee Deshpande and judged by Renuka Shahane. It premiered from 18 March 2022 by replacing He Tar Kahich Nay.

== Concept ==
In season 1, two couples whose marriage is fixed played various games and won various gifts and surprises as "Aaher".

In season 2, various Celebrities share their marriage experiences and chat with host about their relationship.

== Seasons ==
Season	Episodes	Originally Broadcast		Name	Ref.
Season	Episodes	First aired	Last aired	Name	Ref.
1	26	18 March 2022	11 June 2022	Zee Marathicha Aaher Gharat	
2	13	17 June 2022	24 July 2022	Celebritycha Lagna Jorat	

== Guests ==
- Devmanus 2 team
- Bharat Ganeshpure
- Kishori Shahane
- Kirit Somaiya
- Nishigandha Wad
- Alka Kubal
- Shweta Shinde
- Ravi Jadhav
- Aadesh Bandekar
- Jaywant Wadkar
