= Yashoda – Goshta Shyamchya Aaichi =

2023 Indiam Marathi historical TV series

- Genre: Historical
- Directed by: Ganesh Rasane
- Starring: See below
- Country of origin: India
- Original language: Marathi
- No. of episodes: 165

Production
- Producer: Viren Pradhan
- Camera setup: Multi-camera
- Running time: 22 minutes
- Production company: Piccolo Films

Original release
- Network: Zee Marathi
- Release: 13 February – 19 August 2023

Yashoda – Goshta Shyamchya Aaichi (transl. Yashoda – Tale of Shyam's Mother) is an Indian Marathi language historical television series which aired on Zee Marathi. It stars Varada Deodhar, Sarthak Ketkar and Rohini Hattangadi in lead roles. It premiered from 13 February 2023 along with Lavangi Mirchi in the afternoon slot under the segment Aapli Dupar, Zee Marathi Dupar. It was produced by Viren Pradhan and directed by Ganesh Rasane under the banner of Piccolo Films.

== Plot ==
The story of Yashoda, a deeply traditional yet independent woman and mother of Sane Guruji, whom she raised to be a man of unshakeable principles.

== Cast ==
=== Main ===
- Varada Deodhar as Bayo Parchure / Yashoda Sadashiv Sane
- Sarthak Ketkar as Sadashiv Sane

=== Recurring ===
- Rohini Hattangadi as Rukmini Parchure
- Nayana Apte Joshi as Kaveri Sane
- Abhijeet Chavan as Pralhad Keshav Atre
- Mrunmayee Gondhalekar as Radha Parchure
- Vishakh Mhamankar as Narayan Parchure
- Sai Aditi Tushar as Uma Parchure-Jog
- Tarka Pednekar as Godavari Sane
- Mohit Vaidya as Raghunath Sane
- Sarthak Sawant as Damodar Sane
- Harshad Shete as Nilkanth Sane
- Arun Pandarkar as Prabhakar
- Rutuja Chipade as Narmada Parchure
- Rugvedi Pradhan as Sulochana Sane
- Srujan Deshpande as Balkrishna Abhyankar
- Shruti Puranik as Subhadra Parchure
- Arjun Waingankar as Ganpat Parchure
- Ishaan Padhye as Mahadev Parchure
- Ovi Karmarkar as Sakhu
- Gururaj Avadhani
- Srushti Pagare
- Anil Gawas
- Ashok Samel
- Swanand Joshi
- Dinesh Kanade
