= Majhe Pati Saubhagyawati =

Indian Marathi-language TV show

- Genre: Drama
- Written by: Santosh Ayachit; Ashutosh Parandkar
- Directed by: Mandar Devsthali
- Starring: See below
- Voices of: Janhavi Prabhu-Arora
- Composer: Nilesh Moharir
- Country of origin: India
- Original language: Marathi
- No. of episodes: 258

Production
- Producer: Mandar Devsthali
- Editor: Dinesh Potdar
- Camera setup: Multi-camera
- Running time: 22 minutes
- Production company: Ultra Creations

Original release
- Network: Zee Marathi
- Release: 28 September 2015 – 16 July 2016

Majhe Pati Saubhagyawati (transl. My husband is lucky) is a Marathi language television series that aired on Zee Marathi. The series premiered on 28 September 2015 by replacing Julun Yeti Reshimgathi.

== Plot ==
It is a story of Vaibhav Malwankar. Vaibhav and his wife Laxmi come to Mumbai around 14 years ago. He has a dream to become a successful actor, but after too many rejections he has reached a stage where it becomes a crumble. He has one last chance to give a good life for his wife and himself. The role which is going to perform is lady character who gives his career and also help him to change his life completely.

== Cast ==
=== Main ===
- Vaibhav Mangle as Vaibhav Malwankar
- Nandita Patkar as Laxmi Vaibhav Malwankar

=== Recurring ===
- Ashok Shinde as P. K.
- Ramesh Bhatkar as Makarand Bhandari
- Aarti Vadagbalkar as Surekha; Vaibhav's hairstylist
- Uday Sabnis as Laxmi's father
- Adwait Dadarkar as Director of Vaibhav's serial
- Samir Paranjape as Sandy; Laxmi's brother
- Sandeep Pathak as Surekha's husband
- Sneha Majgaonkar as Manisha
- Ruchira Jadhav
- Uma Sardeshmukh
- Surbhi Bhave-Damle

== Reception ==
=== Special episode (1 hour) ===
- 25 October 2015
- 29 November 2015
- 14 February 2016

=== Ratings ===
Week	Year	BARC Viewership		Ref.
Week	Year	TRP	Rank	Ref.
Week 39	2015	0.8	1	
Week 29	2016	1.9	2	
