= Sang Tu Aahes Ka? =

Indian television series

- Genre: Horror; Romance
- Written by: Sameer Garud
- Directed by: Deepak Nalawade
- Starring: See below
- Country of origin: India
- Original language: Marathi
- No. of episodes: 249

Production
- Producer: Vidyadhar Pathare
- Production locations: Mumbai, Maharashtra, India
- Cinematography: Vinayak Jadhav
- Camera setup: Multi-camera
- Running time: 22 minutes
- Production company: Iris Productions

Original release
- Network: Star Pravah
- Release: 7 December 2020 – 2 October 2021

Sang Tu Aahes Ka? (transl. Tell Me Are You Here?) is an Indian Marathi language horror drama produced by Vidyadhar Pathare under the banner of Iris Productions. The show premiered on 7 December 2020 on Star Pravah. It stars Siddharth Chandekar, Shivani Rangole-Kulkarni and Saaniya Chaudhari in lead roles.

== Synopsis ==
Superstar Swaraj Joshi is a widower who lives with the memories of his late wife Vaibhavi. However, her soul returns to unmask the real evil hurting Swaraj and also attempts to unite him with Dr. Vaibhavi.

== Plot ==
Swaraj Joshi, a renowned superstar, makes a comeback to the film industry after a three-year hiatus, burdened by a mysterious past. Dr. Vaibhavi longs to meet him, finds herself drawn into a web of enigmatic events. She delivers a cake to Anandwan on Swaraj's birthday, an encounter that exposes her to a ghostly apparition marked with a symbol. Her encounter takes a terrifying turn as Kabir rescues her, leaving her haunted by the symbol etched on the ghost's foot. Abhay and Krutika plot against Swaraj. Sulakshana, determined to secure Swaraj's wealth, promises Krutika marriage to him as a will clause requires his wife's signature. The vengeful ghost injures Sulakshana after she gives her word. Dr. Vaibhavi crosses paths with Swaraj at the market, unaware of his true identity. Swaraj reluctantly agrees to marry Krutika after the anniversary of Vaibhavi's (his dead wife) tragic demise. On the other side, Swaraj reaches out to Dr. Vaibhavi to become Shashikant's attending physician. During the Shradh Puja, Dr. Vaibhavi enters Anandvan. After tilting the Kalash meant for Vaibhavi at the doorstep, Dr. Vaibhavi senses a strange omen. Krutika's attempts to oust Dr. Vaibhavi fail. Swaraj comes to Dr. Vaibhavi's rescue when the ghost attacks her. Dr. Vaibhavi offers medication for Shashikant's panic attacks and shares her initial encounter with Swaraj with Shambhavi, who predicts her future based on the symbol she keeps seeing. Elsewhere, Swaraj recalls Vaibhavi's memory for her telling him the meaning of the symbol on her foot is Patience. As the engagement ceremony approaches, Swaraj confides in Krutika. Dr. Vaibhavi interrupts the ceremony due to Shashikant's panic attack. Subsequently, Swaraj requests Dr. Vaibhavi to become Shashikant's permanent doctor.

== Cast ==
=== Main ===
- Siddharth Chandekar as Swaraj Shashikant Joshi: Dr. Vaibhavi's husband, Ghost Vaibhavi's widower, Shashikant's son, Kruthika's ex-fiancé
- Saaniya Chaudhari as Vaibhavi "Taisaheb" Joshi (née Mahashabde) (Ghost) : Swaraj's first and late wife
- Shivani Rangole-Kulkarni as Dr. Vaibhavi "Sona" Joshi (née Deshpande/Deshmukh): Swaraj's second wife, Sadhana and Avinash's biological daughter, Narmada's adoptive granddaughter, Shambhavi's adoptive sister

=== Recurring ===
- Sulekha Talwalkar as Sulakshana "Sulu": Swaraj's assumed aunt, Deepti and Durgesh's mother, Sashikant's assumed sister
- Milind Safai as Shashikant Joshi: Swaraj's father, Dr. Vaibhavi and Ghost Vaibhavi's father-in-law, Sulakshana's love interest
- Bhagyashri Dalvi as Deepti: Swaraj's cousin sister; Sulakshana's daughter, Durgesh's sister
- Siddhi Patne / Dipti Lele as Shambhavi Deshpande: A Semiotician; Dr. Vaibhavi's adoptive sister, Narmada's granddaughter
- Rohan Gujar as Inspector Kabir Dixit: Dr. Vaibhavi's childhood friend and ex-fiancé
- Tejas Dongre as Durgesh: Swaraj's cousin brother, Sulakshana's son, Deepti's brother
- Vandana Pandit-Sheth as Narmada "Ajjo" Deshpande: Shambhavi's grandmother and Dr. Vaibhavi's adoptive grandmother
- Pooja Katurde as Krutika Mahajan: Swaraj's ex-fiancée; Abhay's daughter
- Manoj Kolhatkar as Abhay Mahajan: Krutika's father, Sulakshana's ex-husband's friend, Sashikant's business partner, Sulaskshana's help
- Disha Danade as Seema: Maid of the Joshi family, Ghost Vaibhavi's Pathrakhin
- Unknown as Sadhana Avinash Deshmukh: Dr. Vaibhavi's biological mother

== Production ==
=== Filming ===
On 13 April 2021, Chief Minister of Maharashtra, Uddhav Thackeray announced a sudden curfew due to increased Covid cases, while the production halted from 14 April 2021 in Mumbai. Hence, the production location was soon shifted temporarily to Silvassa.

=== Soundtrack ===
The title song of the show "Sang Tu Aahes Ka?" is written by Kshitij Patwardhan and is sung by Rohit Raut and Juilee Joglekar.

== Reception ==
=== Ratings ===
Week	Year	BARC Viewership		Ref.
Week	Year	TRP	Rank	Ref.
Week 2	2021	3.7	5	
Week 5	2021	3.7	5	
Week 6	2021	4.0	4	
Week 7	2021	3.8	4	
Week 9	2021	3.4	5	
Week 10	2021	3.7	5	
Week 11	2021	3.8	5	
Week 12	2021	3.9	5	
Week 15	2021	3.8	5	
Week 19	2021	4.2	4	
Week 20	2021	3.6	4	
Week 21	2021	4.1	4	
