= Gatha Navnathanchi =

Indian Marathi language devotional TV series

- Genre: Spirituality
- Based on: Navanatha Sampradaya
- Directed by: Avinash Waghmare
- Starring: See below
- Theme music composer: Pankaj Padghan; Kailash Kher
- Composer: Guru Thakur
- Country of origin: India
- Original language: Marathi
- No. of episodes: 1156

Production
- Producer: Santosh Ayachit
- Camera setup: Multi-camera
- Running time: 22 minutes
- Production company: Yelkoti Production

Original release
- Network: Sony Marathi
- Release: 21 June 2021 – 4 January 2025

Gatha Navnathanchi (transl. The story of Navnath) is an Indian Marathi language devotional TV series which aired on Sony Marathi. The show premiered on 21 June 2021. Jayesh Shewalkar, Shantanu Gangane, Aniruddha Joshi and Nakul Ghanekar were played the lead roles.

== Plot ==
The serial is about Navnath and the story of nine saints (Navnath) who takes birth on earth for a mission to save humanity and bring order to Earth. They shows each and every mythological events of every navnath.

== Cast ==
- Jayesh Shewalkar as Macchindranath
- Aniruddha Joshi
- Shantanu Gangane
- Nakul Ghanekar as Gorakshnath
- Prathamesh Viveki as Chouranginath
- Aarav Khot as Charpatinath
- Surabhi Hande as Devi Saptashrungi
- Roshan Vichare
- Mrudula Kulkarni
- Amrut Gaikwad
- Pratiksha Jadhav as Mainavati
- Milind Shinde
- Omkar Botre as Laxman
- Sachin Gawali as Jaising
- Sneha Surve as Renuka
- Kamalanand Patil as Keshav
- Sonali Salunke as Jaya
