= Manava Naik =

Indian actress and director

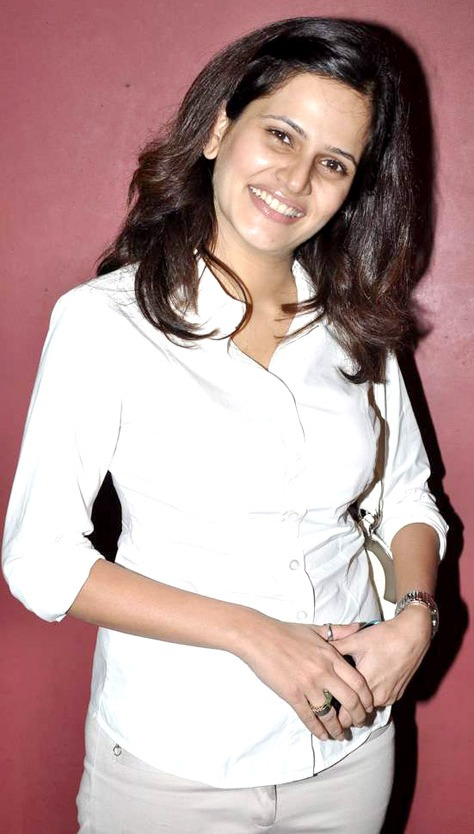
- Naik at the premier of her film No Entry Pudhe Dhoka Aahey
- Born: 8 September 1982 (age 43); Mumbai, India
- Occupations: Actress producer director emcee
- Spouse: Sushant Tungare (m. 2017)

Manava Naik is an Indian actress, producer, emcee and director from Mumbai. She has acted in several Marathi films, plays and Hindi Television shows. She started her career with the STAR One TV show Special Squad. She has appeared in shows like, Teen Bahuraniyaan, Baa Bahoo Aur Baby., She works in Marathi and Hindi films as an actress, she has turned director by directing the Marathi movie Por Baazar.

== Filmography ==
=== Television ===
Year	Title	Language	Role	Ref.
1999-2001	Aabhalmaya	Marathi	Anushka	
2002	Khichdi	Hindi	Saguna	
2005	Special Squad	Hindi	Neha Nair	
2005	Baa Bahoo Aur Baby	Hindi	Dimple Anish Kotak (née Thakkar)	
2007	Teen Bahuraniyaan	Hindi	Manjeet Gheewala	
2013-14	Tuza Maza Jamena	Marathi	Manava	
2021-23	Tumchi Mulgi Kay Karte?	Marathi	Nilanjana Verma Also the producer for the show	
2023-24	Karan Gunhyala Maafi Naahi	Marathi	Nilanjana Verma Also the producer for the show	

=== Films ===
Year	Title	Language	Role
2008	Jodhaa Akbar	Hindi	Neelakshi
2010	Kshanbhar Vishranti	Marathi	Neha
2011	Fakt Ladh Mhana	Marathi	Girlfriend of West Indies
2012	Dum Asel Tar	Marathi	Sonal
2012	No Entry Pudhe Dhoka Aahey	Marathi	Sanjana
2014	Por Baazar	Marathi	Director
2015	Dhinchak Enterprise	Marathi	Actor
2019	Special Dish	Marathi	Nandini Marathe
2015	Shasan	Marathi	Indrayani
2016	Pindadan	Marathi	Ruhi
2016	Jaundya Na Balasaheb	Marathi	Urmi

=== Theatre ===
Year	Title	Language	Role
2011	Hamidabaichi Kothi	Marathi	Shabbo
2012	All the Best (musical)	Marathi	Mohini
2018	Hamlet	Marathi	Ophelia
2022	Kaali Rani	Marathi	The Queen
