= Tuza Maza Jamena =

Marathi-language comedy TV series

- Genre: Comedy
- Written by: Pravin Tarde
- Directed by: Girish Vasaikar
- Starring: See below
- Country of origin: India
- Original language: Marathi
- No. of episodes: 125

Production
- Producer: Mahesh Manjrekar
- Production locations: Mumbai, Maharashtra
- Camera setup: Multi-camera
- Running time: 22 minutes

Original release
- Network: Zee Marathi
- Release: 13 May – 5 October 2013

Tuza Maza Jamena (transl. You don't agree with me) is an Indian Marathi-language comedy TV series which aired on Zee Marathi. It starred Manava Naik, Vaibhav Tatwawadi and Reema Lagoo in lead roles. It premiered from 13 May 2013 by replacing Ajunahi Chandraat Aahe. It ended on 5 October 2013 completing 125 episodes. It is produced by Mahesh Manjrekar and directed by Girish Vasaikar. It is a TV adaptation of the Marathi movie Matichya Chuli written by Mahesh Manjrekar.

== Cast ==
=== Main ===
- Manava Naik as Manava Vaibhav Limaye
- Reema Lagoo as Reema Shridhar Limaye
- Vaibhav Tatwawadi as Vaibhav Shridhar Limaye

=== Recurring ===
- Bhalchandra Kadam
- Shridhar Limaye
- Shriram Pendse
- Vidyadhar Joshi
- Abhijeet Kelkar
- Pournima Manohar
- Savita Malpekar
- Dipti Lele
