= Pratiksha Jadhav =

Indian film actress

- प्रतीक्षा जाधव
- Born: Pune, Maharashtra, India
- Occupation: Actress
- Years active: 2009–present
- Parent: Vijaya Jadhav Sahebrao Jadhav

Pratiksha Jadhav is an Indian actress who was born and brought up in Pune. She is best known for her work in Marathi cinema, Marathi serials, Hindi serials and Marathi plays.

== Early life ==
During her college days she actively participated in inter-collegiate drama competitions. She started her acting career from Marathi movie "Chala Khel Khelu Ya Doghe" in 2009. She also acted in TV commercials and serials.

== Career ==
She acted in various Marathi films and commercial dramas. She is also classical dancer. She appeared in comic role in Marathi film "Bhootacha Honeymoon" which received appreciation from audience.

== Filmography ==
=== Marathi films ===
- Are Deva (2007)
- Jakhami police(2008)
- Chala Khel Khelu Ya Doghe (2009)
- Tatya Vinchu Lage Raho (2013)
- Power (2013)
- Bhootacha Honeymoon (2013)
- He Milan Saubhagyache (2013)
- Saubhagya Majha Daivat (2015)
- Dagudumootha Dandakor (2015 South Indian)

=== Marathi plays ===
- Darling Darling (2009)
- Me Sharukh Manjar Sumbhekar (2010)
- Karun Gelo Gaon (2011)

=== Hindi serials ===
- Crime Patrol (2016)
- Dil Dhoondta Hai (2017)

=== Marathi serials ===
- Dilya Ghari Tu Sukhi Raha (2011-2012)
- Mendichya Panavar (2012)
- Chhoti Malkin (2017)
- Molkarin Bai – Mothi Tichi Savali (2019-2020)
- Devmanus (2020-2021)
- Tuza Maza Jamtay (2021)
- Tuzhya Ishqacha Naadkhula (2021)
- Gatha Navnathanchi (2021)
- Kasturi (2023)
