= Swarajyajanani Jijamata =

Indian biography drama

- Genre: Biopic Drama
- Directed by: Vivek Deshpande; Ajay Kurne
- Starring: Neena Kulkarni; Amol Kolhe; Bhargavi Chirmule; Amruta Pawar; Shantanu Moghe; Roshan Vichare
- Theme music composer: Mandar Cholkar; Abhijeet Pendharkar
- Country of origin: India
- Original language: Marathi
- No. of episodes: 573

Production
- Producers: Amol Kolhe; Vilas Sawant; Sonali Rao
- Camera setup: Multi-Camera
- Running time: 22 minutes
- Production company: Jagdamb Creations

Original release
- Network: Sony Marathi
- Release: 19 August 2019 – 3 October 2021

Swarajya Janani Jijamata is an Indian Marathi television biopic drama premiered on 19 August 2019 airing on Sony Marathi.

== Plot ==
It is the story of Jijamata, mother of Maharashtra's idol Shivaji. It shows Jijamata's personal life since a young age and chaotic times she grew up in. The show takes us through all the phases of her life and roles she played as a daughter, wife, mother and queen of swarajya.

== Cast ==
- Amol Kolhe as Shivaji
  - Divesh Medge as Young Shivaji
- Neena Kulkarni as Elder Jijamata
  - Bhargavi Chirmule as Middle-Aged Jijamata
    - Amruta Pawar as Young Jijamata
      - Nishtha Vaidya as Child Jijamata
- Shantanu Moghe as Shahaji
  - Vikram Gaikwad as Middle-Aged Shahaji
    - Roshan Vichare as Young Shahaji
      - Sahil Deshmukh Khan as Child Shahaji
      - Anand Kale As Prataprao Gujar
- Amit Tadwalkar as Afzal Khan
- Smita Shewale as Umabai
- Parineeta Pawaskar as Godatai
- Gauri Kiran as Soyarabai
- Swapnali Patil as Mhalsabai Jadhav (Jijamata's mother)
- Sneha Mangal as Bhagirathibai
- Sayali Sunil as Putalabai
- Vinay Hake as Moin Khan
- Amod Jande as Jagdevrao Jadhav (Jijamata's Uncle)
- Shripad Panase as Baji Prabhu Deshpande
- Monika Dabade as Shevanta / Sakina
- Priya Marathe as Raibagan
- Ahmad Harhash as Main Khan

== Production ==
It is produced by Amol Kolhe under the banner of Jagdamb Creations.

=== Casting ===
Amruta Pawar was selected for Middle age Jijamata. After few days Amruta quits the show and Bhargavi Chirmule reprising the role of Jijamata. After that Bhargavi also quits the show then, Neena Kulkarni was selected for Elder Jijamata. Amol Kolhe was cast in the role of Chhatrapati Shivaji.
