= Star Pravah =

Indian Marathi-language soap opera channel

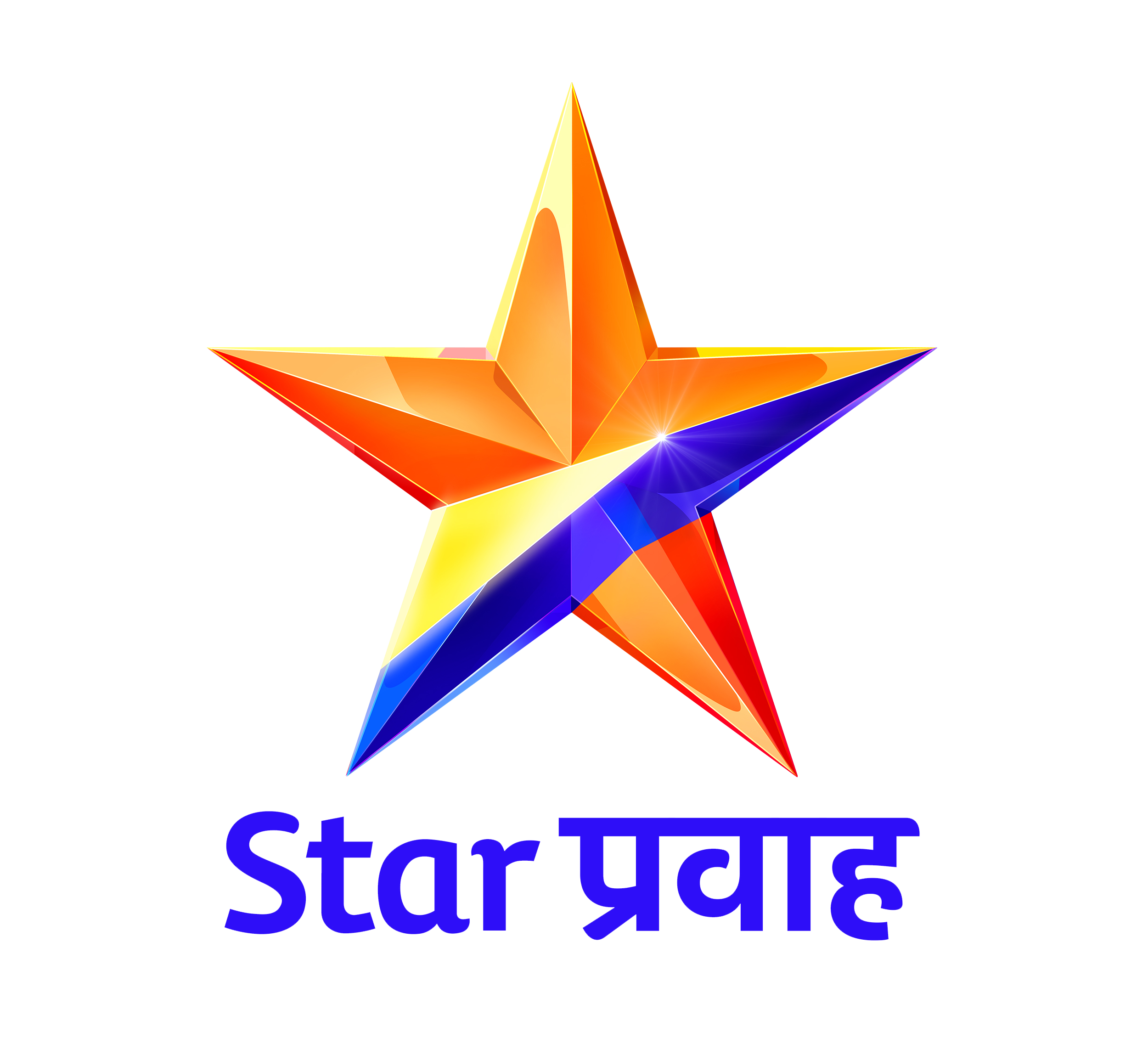
- Logo used since 2019
- Country: India
- Broadcast area: India
- Headquarters: Mumbai, Maharashtra, India

Programming
- Language: Marathi
- Picture format: 1080p HDTV

Ownership
- Owner: JioStar
- Sister channels: JioStar channels

History
- Launched: 24 November 2008; 17 years ago

Links
- Website: Star Pravah on JioHotstar Star Pravah on YouTube

Availability

Streaming media
- JioHotstar: India
- YouTube: India

Star Pravah is an Indian Marathi language general entertainment pay television channel owned by JioStar, a joint venture between Viacom18 and Disney India. It primarily telecasts family dramas, comedies, reality shows and films.

== History ==
The channel rebranded itself with a new logo and graphics on 10 October 2016, accompanied by the new tagline, "Aata Thambaych Naay आता थांबायचं नाय" (lit. 'Do not stop now'). On 2 December 2019, the channel again underwent rebranding, introducing a new logo and the tagline, "Marathi Parampara Marathi Pravah मराठी परंपरा मराठी प्रवाह" (lit. 'Marathi Tradition, Marathi Culture'). Additionally, on 1 May 2016, the high-definition feed of the channel, named Star Pravah HD, was launched.

== Sister channel ==
=== Pravah Picture ===
Pravah Picture (also known as Star Pravah Picture) is a Marathi language movie pay television channel owned by JioStar a Joint Venture between Viacom18 and Disney India Along with its HD version, the channel has gone live from 15 May 2022 onwards.
