= Bigg Boss Marathi season 4 =

Indian Marathi reality show

Bigg Boss Marathi
- Season 4
- Presented by: Mahesh Manjrekar
- No. of days: 98
- No. of housemates: 19
- Winner: Akshay Kelkar
- Runner-up: Apurva Nemlekar
- No. of episodes: 99

Release
- Original network: Colors Marathi; Voot Select
- Original release: 2 October 2022 – 8 January 2023

Season chronology
- ← Previous; Season 3 Next → Season 5

Bigg Boss Marathi 4 is the fourth season of Marathi version of the reality television show Bigg Boss broadcast in India. The premiere was held on 2 October 2022 on Colors Marathi and Voot with Mahesh Manjrekar.

== Production ==
=== Teaser ===
On 24 July 2022, the makers had officially launched the season 4 promo on Colors Marathi. After few days Mahesh Manjrekar confirmed his return to host this show.

=== Eye logo ===
The border of the eye is golden with a dark pink background. In middle, there is rangoli type design and has the initials BB.

=== Concept ===
The theme and concept of this season is "All is well" which means that "hope" that everything will be fine and no unwell things will happen in the house.

=== House ===
The House of this season had a "Chawl" theme. The House was located in Goregaon for the third time. For the first time in the history of Bigg Boss Marathi the season had Balcony which represents 75 years of Independence.

=== Development ===
The press conference and launch event for this season was held on 26 September 2022, anchored by former contestant Vikas Patil.

=== Broadcast ===
Apart from the usual hour-long episode, viewers also has access to the direct 24x7 camera footage. The viewers also has access to Before TV on Voot Select where the episode will telecast 30 minutes before it will telecast on Colors Marathi. On weekdays, the show aired at 10.00 PM IST and the weekend show, Bigg Bosschi Chavadi, aired at 9.30 PM IST.

== Housemates status ==
Sr no.	Housemate	Day entered	Day exited	Status
1	Akshay	Day 1	Day 98	Winner
2	Apurva	Day 1	Day 98	1st Runner-up
3	Kiran	Day 1	Day 98	2nd Runner-up
4	Amruta Dh	Day 1	Day 98	3rd Runner-up
5	Rakhi	Day 57	Day 98	4th Runner-up
6	Aroh	Day 57	Day 94	Evicted
7	Prasad	Day 1	Day 91	Evicted
8	Amruta De	Day 1	Day 77	Evicted
9	Vikas	Day 1	Day 76	Evicted
10	Snehlata	Day 28	Day 70	Evicted
11	Rohit	Day 1	Day 63	Evicted
12	Tejaswini	Day 1	Day 58	Walked
13	Samruddhi	Day 1	Day 56	Evicted
14	Yashashri	Day 1	Day 49	Evicted
15	Ruchira	Day 1	Day 42	Evicted
16	Trishul	Day 1	Day 35	Evicted
17	Yogesh	Day 1	Day 28	Evicted
18	Megha	Day 1	Day 21	Evicted
19	Nikhil	Day 1	Day 14	Evicted

-

== Housemates ==
The list of contestants in the order of entering the house

=== Original entrants ===
- Tejaswini Lonari - Film and television actress. Known for playing roles in film Guldasta, Chinu, Doghat Tisra Aata Sagla Visra. She was played a lead role of Rani Padmini in Chittod Ki Rani Padmini Ka Johur. She also played a role in Zee Marathi's Devmanus 2.
- Prasad Jawade - Television actor. He started his career from Maharashtracha Superstar as a contestant. He is known for playing a lead role in Zee Marathi's serials such as Arundhati and Ase He Kanyadan.
- Nikhil Rajeshirke - Television actor. Known for playing supporting roles in TV series such as Majhi Tujhi Reshimgath, Ajunahi Barsaat Aahe and Rang Majha Vegla.
- Amruta Dhongade - Television actress. Known for playing a lead role in Zee Marathi's Mrs. Mukhyamantri. She made her debut in film with Mithun. She also played lead role in Tu Chandane Shimpit Jashi.
- Kiran Mane - Television actor. Known for playing the role in Majhya Navaryachi Bayko and Mulgi Zali Ho. He performed in many plays such as Shree Tashi Sau, Perfect Mismatch, Govind Ghya Gopal Ghya and Jhund, etc. He also did small roles in Marathi films.
- Samruddhi Jadhav - Reality television actress, participated in MTV Splitsvilla.
- Akshay Kelkar - Television actor. He is known for playing a lead role in Colors TV's Nima Denzongpa, Sony SAB's Bhakharwadi and also played roles in serials such as Yek Number, Don Cutting.
- Apurva Nemlekar – Television actress. She made her debut with Zee Marathi's Aabhas Ha. She is known for her portrayal in Zee Marathi's Ratris Khel Chale 2 and Ratris Khel Chale 3.
- Yogesh Jadhav - Fighter. He rose to fame after his appearance in MTV Roadies X4.
- Amruta Deshmukh - Television actress. She is known for her role in Freshers. She made her debut with Star Pravah's Tumcha Aamcha Same Asta. She also played a lead role in Sony Marathi's Mi Tujhich Re.
- Yashashri Masurkar - Television actress. She is best known for her role in Hindi TV series Rang Badalti Odhani. She also played a role in the serial Chakravartin Ashoka Samrat. She did episodic roles in Savdhaan India and Crime Patrol.
- Vikas Sawant - Choreographer. He choreographed many Bollywood actors such as Ranveer Singh, Salman Khan, Sonakshi Sinha, etc. Before choreographer he was the joker in EsselWorld.
- Megha Ghadge - Film actress and dancer. She made her debut with Maherchi Maya. She is known for her portrayal in Pachhadlela. She is also known for her Lavani.
- Trishul Marathe - Social influencer and struggling actor. He is the first commoner in Bigg Boss Marathi.
- Ruchira Jadhav - Television actress. Mainly acted in Zee Marathi's Majhe Pati Saubhagyawati and Majhya Navaryachi Bayko. She also did a lead role in Haemolymph: Invisible Blood as Sajida Shaikh.
- Rohit Shinde - Model and doctor. He was Mr. India and MOTG International. He is boyfriend of Ruchira Jadhav.

=== Wild card entrants ===
- Snehlata Vasaikar - Television actress. She is known for playing the character of Soyarabai in Swarajyarakshak Sambhaji. She was also a contestant in Fu Bai Fu. She also did a role of Gautamabai in Punyashlok Ahilyabai.

=== Challengers ===
- Aroh Welankar - Actor. Known for films like Rege and Ghanta. He was a finalist on Bigg Boss Marathi season 2 where he finished in 6th position.
- Rakhi Sawant - Actress and dancer. She was a contestant on Bigg Boss (Hindi TV series) season 1 where she was evicted on Day 84 in 4th place, Bigg Boss (Hindi TV series) season 14 where she was a finalist finishing as 4th Runner-Up and Bigg Boss (Hindi TV series) season 15 where she was evicted on Day 117 in 7th place.

=== Guests ===
- Mira Jagannath - Television actress. Known for playing the role of Momo in Yeu Kashi Tashi Me Nandayla and supporting role in Majhya Navaryachi Bayko. She was a contestant on Bigg Boss Marathi season 3 where she was evicted on Day 95, in 6th place.
- Vishal Nikam - Television actor and model. Known for playing lead role in Dakkhancha Raja Jotiba and Sata Jalmachya Gathi. He was last seen in Jay Bhawani Jay Shivaji as Shiva Kashid. He was the winner of Bigg Boss Marathi season 3.

== Twists ==
=== Duties ===
On Launch Day before housemates entering the house. They were given options to choose their duties. Bigg Boss made four teams of duties and according to the duties they provided bands to the contestant.

Band colour	Duties	Contestants
Blue	Kitchen (Night)	Tejaswini
Blue	Kitchen (Night)	Amruta Dh
Blue	Kitchen (Night)	Rohit
Blue	Kitchen (Night)	Yashashri
Yellow	Kitchen (Day)	Prasad
Yellow	Kitchen (Day)	Apurva
Yellow	Kitchen (Day)	Yogesh
Yellow	Kitchen (Day)	Samruddhi
Purple	Cleaning	Nikhil
Purple	Cleaning	Vikas
Purple	Cleaning	Ruchira
Purple	Cleaning	Megha
Red	Utensils	Kiran
Red	Utensils	Akshay
Red	Utensils	Trishul
Red	Utensils	Amruta De

== Weekly summary ==
Week 1	Entrances	On Grand Premiere, Tejaswini, Prasad, Nikhil, Amruta Dh, Kiran, Samruddhi, Akshay, Apurva, Yogesh, Amruta De, Yashashri, Vikas, Megha, Trishul, Ruchira and Rohit entered the house as housemates.
Week 1	Twist	On first day, The 16 contestants divided into four members of the group and were asked to decide who is "Useless" among them. The four members who selected as useless were Prasad, Rohit, Trishul and Megha.
Week 1	Nomination	Aatli Batli Phutli (The Bottle Break) Useless contestants get immunity from the bigg boss to nominate any three contestants. For that they had to put the bottle of glasses on whom they want to nominate. As a result, Amruta De, Nikhil, Yashashri, Yogesh, Vikas and Tejaswini were nominated.
Week 1	Main task	De Dhadak - Be Dhadak (Fearless) Bigg Boss announces a new task De Dhadak Be Dhadak, for which the housemates are divided into two teams. According to the task, the two teams had to make the dishes. Following the steps, the team, which has the maximum number of dishes after the buzzer rings, will win the particular round. Prasad and Apurva become the sanchaalak of the two teams. Team A - Prasad, Trishul, Tejaswini, Ruchira, Amruta De, Rohit, Kiran and Samruddhi Team B - Apurva, Akshay, Megha, Vikas, Amruta Dh, Yogesh, Yashashri and Nikhil
Week 1	Result	De Dhadak Be Dhadak task was cancelled after poor behaviour of contestants
Week 1	Captaincy Contenders	Samruddhi and Tejaswini
Week 1	Captaincy task	Ye Re Ye Re Paisa (Come in, Come in Money) In the task, two contenders had to throw notes of the BB points from the balcony to the garden area and their teammates had to collect them to buy golden bricks. The captaincy contender who will collect more BB points notes and buy bricks will be the captain of the first week.
Week 1	Result	Winner (Captaincy) – Samruddhi
Week 1	Result	Failed (Captaincy) – Tejaswini
Week 1	House Captain	Samruddhi Jadhav
Week 1	Exits	There was no eviction in the first week.
Week 2
Week 2	Nomination	Nomination Express In the task, Bigg Boss had arranged two train sections, green and red on the board. In green section, the contestants had to stick the names of contestants they wanted to save and in the red section, the contestants had to stick the names of contestants they wanted to nominate. As a result, Akshay, Amruta Dh, Amruta De, Rohit, Ruchira, Nikhil, Yogesh and Vikas were nominated.
Week 2	Main task	BB Airport The garden is turned into an airport. When buzzer plays, they have to take luggage of the other contestant and have to get on the port. The person who enters the port last will show the bag of the contestant that he/she has and that person will be eliminated from the captaincy. When alarm plays, they all have to get down from the port, the last one to get out will show the bag he/she has will be eliminated too. So each round will eliminate two contestants from the race.
Week 2	Result	Winner (Main task) – Rohit and Akshay
Week 2	Result	Failed (Main task) – Everyone else
Week 2	Captaincy Contenders	Rohit and Akshay
Week 2	Captaincy task	Parking Cha Raja (Parking's King) Bigg Boss announced captaincy task Parking Cha King and asked the two contenders to fight for the captaincy in the task, Bigg Boss gave one car each to Akshay and Rohit. The two contenders had to push and park the car by using their strength. The two contenders also had to convince and choose two contestants each to help them reach the parking spot.
Week 2	Result	Winner (Captaincy) – Rohit
Week 2	Result	Failed (Captaincy) – Akshay
Week 2	House Captain	Rohit Shinde
Week 2	Exits	On Day 15, Nikhil Rajeshirke was evicted after facing public votes.
Week 3	Nomination	Phata Poster Nikla Kon? (Torn Poster Who Came) Bigg Boss announced nomination task Phata Poster Nikla Kon and give everyone each other's poster for nomination. The contestant who first shredded the poster of another contestant that contestant will get nominate. As a result, Apurva, Amruta De, Kiran, Megha and Yashashri were nominated.
Week 3	Main task	Jabra Fan (Big Fan) The contestants got the "Jabra Fan" task. The two teams unanimously chose Tejaswini and Samruddhi as the Star Performers of the week. Tejaswini and Samruddhi were the stars of the week and Bigg Boss asked them to select their fans from the rest of the contestants. The fans had to make star shaped paper from the given stencil and protect them from opposite team. The team, who would have more Star shaped papers would win the round. Tejaswini and Samruddhi had to give hearts to the fans they wanted to. Tejaswini's fans - Prasad, Vikas, Kiran, Amruta De, Amruta Dh, and Yogesh Samruddhi's fans - Apurva, Akshay, Megha, Yashashri, Ruchira and Trishul First round Apurva protected Samruddhi's star paper more. Samruddhi gave hearts to Apurva. Second round Amruta Dhongade protected Tejaswini's star paper more. Tejaswini gave hearts to Amruta Dhongade.
Week 3	Result	Winner (Main task) – Tejaswini, Samruddhi, Apurva and Amruta Dhongade
Week 3	Result	Failed (Main task) – Everyone else
Week 3	Captaincy contenders	Tejaswini and Apurva
Week 3	Captaincy task	Vajava Re Vajava (Play It Play) Bigg Boss announced the captaincy task "Vajva Re Vajava" in which Bigg Boss erected the cassettes in the garden. Both contenders got one-one cassettes and both got two supporters. Both supporters would tape in that cassette.
Week 3	Result	Winner (Captaincy) – Apurva
Week 3	Result	Failed (Captaincy) – Tejaswini
Week 3	House Captain	Apurva Nemlekar
Week 3	Exits	On Day 21, Megha Ghadge was evicted after facing public votes.
Week 4	Twist	This week has "Diwali" theme. Bigg Boss invited Mumbai's famous Dabbawalas. Bigg Boss informed all contestants that people from all the corners of Maharashtra have sent Diwali Faral to the housemates and bring it for them.
Week 4	Nomination	Rocket Nomination Bigg Boss announced the nomination task of the week. The contestants had to nominate other housemates who they think are indecisive and ineligible to be a part of the house. The contestants had to nominate contestants in pair format by sticking two pair cards in the rocket. As a result, Kiran, Amruta De, Trishul, Vikas, Prasad and Yogesh were nominated.
Week 4	Main task	Pahuni Yeti Ghari (Guests Will Come) Bigg Boss welcomed the Tanvi Mundle & Vivek Sangle in the house and housemates greeted them by wishing Happy Diwali. Bigg Boss later assigned a cooking task to the contestants and asked the guests to examine the task. Bigg Boss also informed everyone that this would also be a part of their weekly task. Bigg Boss divided 14 contestants into two groups Team A and Team B. Bigg Boss then asked both the teams to select one person from their team who was good at cooking. Team B assigned Apurva and Team A assigned Amruta Dhongade. Bigg Boss also asked the teams to select a person who can host while cooking. Team A assigned Prasad and Team B assigned Amruta Deshmukh. Later, Bigg Boss asked both of them to make Gulab Jamun and the guests to judge the sweet dish in terms of taste, presentation and hosting skills. Then the cooking competition commenced between Apurva and Amruta Dhongade. The duo completed the task in the given time and made Gulab Jamun. The guests tasted both the dishes and they liked Apurva's Gulab Jamun and her host Amruta Deshmukh's hosting than Amruta Dhongade's Gulab Jamun and Prasad's hosting. Based on this the guests then announced team B as the winner of the task. Team A - Prasad, Yogesh, Tejaswini, Amruta Dh, Kiran, Vikas and Samruddhi Team B - Apurva, Akshay, Ruchira, Rohit, Amruta De, Trishul, Yashashri
Week 4	Result	Winner (Main task) – Team B
Week 4	Result	Failed (Main task) – Team A
Week 4	Celebration	Banker, Social worker and wife of deputy chief minister of Maharashtra Devendra Fadnavis, Amruta Fadnavis entered the house. Amruta made her smashing entry and surprised all the contestants. Bigg Boss welcomed Amruta to enjoy the Diwali party in the house with the contestants.
Week 4	Captaincy contenders	Akshay and Vikas
Week 4	Captaincy task	Dhuvun Taak (Wash It) Bigg Boss announces a captaincy task where the contenders can choose their two supporters. The task is about a display window of the shop where two contestants are standing as mannequins. The supporters have to spoil the glass display window of the other contender and each team has to protect their display while destroying that of others. Amruta De was the Sanchalak in this game.
Week 4	House Captain	Akshay Kelkar
Week 4	Exits	On Day 28, Yogesh Jadhav was evicted after facing public votes.
Week 5	Entrance	On Day 29, Snehlata Vasaikar entered as First wild card entry of this season.
Week 5	Nomination	Vish-Amrut (Poison-Elixir) The nomination task "Vish-Amrut" was given to the contestants. Bigg Boss had arranged four boxes in four different areas of the house. After the buzzer, the contestants had to reach the area and get the Vish and Amrut's bottles from the boxes. The contestant who would get Vish bottles can nominate others by giving them the bottles while contestant who would get Amrut bottles can save others by giving them the bottles. As a result, Samruddhi, Amruta Dh, Amruta De, Vikas, Kiran, Prasad and Trishul were nominated.
Week 5	Main task	Khulla Karaycha Rada (Do Matter Openly) Bigg Boss announces weekly task of the week is "Khulla Karaycha Rada". In which Bigg Boss erected See-Saw in the garden. Bigg Boss divided into two groups Team A and Team B in the house. Every team members will seated on both side of See-Saw and opposite team tried their trick to remove them from the seat of the See-Saw. They used every trick including throwing garbage, water, chilli powder on opposite team. Team A - Apurva, Trishul, Akshay, Ruchira, Amruta De, Rohit and Snehlata Team B - Kiran, Vikas, Tejaswini, Prasad, Amruta Dh, Yashashri and Samruddhi
Week 5	Result	Winner (Main task) – Team B
Week 5	Result	Failed (Main task) – Team A
Week 5	Captaincy contenders task	Bigg Boss gave an interesting task to the Team B. Bigg Boss give one balloon to each to the contestants of Team B and asked Team A to pop the balloons of Team B contestants, whom they want to eliminate from the captaincy race. Along with it, Team B had to run fast and press the ring buzzer. The first who ring the buzzer had to request Team A to not pop his or her balloon & also share the name of contestant from their team who is not eligible for the captain.
Week 5	Captaincy Contenders	Samruddhi and Yashashri
Week 5	Captaincy task	Lagori The two contenders had to arrange heavyweight sponges according to size, Yashashri and Samruddhi had to place the sponges according to their sizes. In each round, the captaincy contenders can take three supporters & with their help, the contenders had to save their sponge building.
Week 5	House Captain	Samruddhi Jadhav
Week 5	Exits	On Day 35, Trishul Marathe was evicted after facing public votes.
Week 6	Nomination	Vishay End (Topic End) Bigg Boss gave nomination task "Vishay End" to the contestants. Bigg Boss divided 13 contestants into two teams and appointed Samruddhi as a Sanchalak. In this task, contestants had to nominate contestants from the opposite team. Bigg Boss asked to both teams to appoint two contestants for six rounds. One contestant has to make hammer with given instrument after the buzzer rings and one contestant had to protect it. The one who will make the hammer first & reach the sanchalak first will get a chance to nominate one contestant from opposite team. As a result, Amruta Dh, Yashashri, Tejaswini, Snehlata, Prasad and Ruchira were nominated.
Week 6	Main task	Senior V/S Junior Bigg Boss announced a weekly task for that bigg boss made two teams. Team B had to blindfold Team A for the captaincy. Later, they had to drop them in jail and lock them up. After the buzzer, they had to hide the name boxes in various parts of the garden area. After the second buzzer, the team who is in the jail had to come out and find their boxes & cross the wall. The contestant who will find their box in last will be out of the captaincy. Team A - Apurva, Akshay, Kiran, Yashashri and Snehlata Team B - Amruta De, Vikas, Tejaswini, Prasad, Amruta Dh, Ruchira and Rohit
Week 6	Result	Winner (Main task) – Team A : Kiran & Team B : Rohit
Week 6	Result	Failed (Main task) – Everyone else
Week 6	Captaincy contenders	Kiran and Rohit
Week 6	Captaincy task	Valentine's Day Bigg Boss announced the new captaincy task "Valentine's Day". In this task, the two contenders had to choose their supporters among contestants who will help them to win the game. The captaincy contenders had to appoint two supporters in each round. After every buzzer, the supporters had to collect the cotton from the store room and fill it inside the teddy bear. The team who will make the more teddy bears, will win the captaincy.
Week 6	House Captain	Rohit Shinde
Week 6	Exits	On Day 42, Ruchira Jadhav was evicted after facing public votes.
Week 7	Nomination	Amruta De, Amruta Dh, Prasad, Tejaswini, Kiran and Yashashri were nominated.
Week 7	Main task	Sosal Titkach Social (Absorb as Social) Bigg Boss announced all the contestants to participate in "Sosal Titkach Social" task. In the task, contestants had to give each other challenges & the contestants had to complete them. Team Yellow - Akshay, Kiran, Yashashri, Samruddhi, Amruta Dh and Amruta De Team Red - Apurva, Vikas, Tejaswini, Prasad, Snehlata and Rohit
Week 7	Result	Winner (Main task) – Team Red : Vikas & Team Yellow : Amruta Dh
Week 7	Result	Failed (Main task) – Everyone else
Week 7	Captaincy contenders	Vikas and Amruta Dh
Week 7	Captaincy task	Tik Tik Vajate Captaincy Chi (Captaincy Ticking) In this task, Contenders got one cardboard each which has the shape of a social media "Blue Tick" & they had to fill the given cardboard "Blue Tick" by adding sponges in it. In all three rounds the contenders had to properly fill tick with sponges & complete it. The contender, who will complete the tick, first will be the winner of the task.
Week 7	Result	Captaincy was dissolved as contenders had tied
Week 7	House Captain	None
Week 7	Exits	On Day 49, Yashashri Masurkar was evicted after facing public votes.
Week 8	Twist	Mahesh Manjrekar said Kiran Mane was evicted due to less votes but then they sent him in the secret room.
Week 8	Nomination	Varul Deta Ka Varul (Give Me Some Wind) Bigg Boss announced new nomination task "Varul Deta Ka Varul". Bigg Boss asked the housemates to carrying a photograph of each other. All contestants got a photograph of another contestants & if they want to nominate the contestant whose photograph they are carrying they can. As a result, Amruta De, Prasad, Rohit, Samruddhi, Akshay and Apurva.
Week 8	Main task	BB Ranking Kiran Mane reenter the house. Bigg Boss later assigned a task to Kiran & asked him to rank the 10 contestants of the house from 1-10 by seeing the contestants strategies and performance in the last 51 days.
Week 8	Result	Winner (Main task) – Tejaswini and Rohit
Week 8	Result	Failed (Main task) – Everyone else
Week 8	Captaincy contenders	Tejaswini and Rohit
Week 8	House Captain	None
Week 8	Punishment	Amruta Dhongade was severely punished for damaging the bigg boss property of the house. Bigg Boss take her captaincy for two weeks.; Rohit Shinde and Vikas Sawant involved in fight in Elephant and Ant task. Bigg Boss puts both of them in the jail.
Week 8	Exits	On Day 56, Samruddhi Jadhav was evicted after facing public votes.
Week 9	Entrances	Mira Jagannath, Rakhi Sawant, Aroh Velankar and Vishal Nikam introduced as the challengers.
Week 9	Challenger's Nomination	Bigg Boss asked challengers to nominate anyone among the 11 contestants. Bigg Boss also asked them to choose favourite one. Bigg Boss asked the four challengers to push contestants into the pool they wanted to nominate. As a result, Amruta De, Prasad, Apurva and Rohit were nominated.
Week 9	Main task	Bigg Boss Chi Sutti (Bigg Boss's Holiday) New Task were announced as "Bigg Boss Chi Sutti" where challengers will be cruel kings & queens, contestants will have to follow their orders, and Challengers will try to irritate them so much that contestants try to leave the task. Contestants have to fulfil Challenger's orders as soon as they are given. BB Birthday Bash Bigg Boss announced Birthday Bash Party of himself. Where contestants have to dance on the songs. Bigg Boss also assigned the task of selecting contenders for the captaincy to the four challengers along with them.
Week 9	Result	Winner (Bigg Boss Chi Sutti) – Challengers
Week 9	Result	Failed (Main task) – Contestants
Week 9	Result	Winner (BB Birthday Bash) – Apurva, Akshay, Vikas and Kiran
Week 9	Result	Failed (BB Birthday Bash) – Everyone else
Week 9	Captaincy contenders	Apurva, Akshay, Vikas, Kiran, Mira, Vishal, Rakhi and Aroh
Week 9	Captaincy task	Meter Down Bigg Boss announced a new captaincy task "Meter Down" in which each contenders got a dummy taxi. If they want captaincy, they have to go first in that dummy taxi.
Week 9	House Captain	Akshay Kelkar
Week 9	Exits	On Day 59, Tejaswini Lonari exit the show after her right hand fracture that needs medical treatment.; On Day 63, Vishhal Nikam and Mira Jagannath left the house after they completed their duration as guest.; On Day 64, Rohit Shinde was evicted after facing public votes.
Week 10	Nomination	Bigg Boss asked captain Akshay to nominate any one contestant from the given pair. As per the task, the pairs had to explain their contributions & entertainment factors to Akshay & the latter had decide to which contestant to nominate from the given pair. The pair were - 1) Rakhi-Aroh 2) Apurva-Amruta Dh 3) Vikas-Kiran-Prasad 4) Snehlata-Amruta De As a result, Aroh, Apurva, Vikas and Snehlata were nominated.
Week 10	Main task	BB High School Team A had to be the teachers and Team B had to be the students. Team A had to pass only one student and fail other students. One pass student would be the captaincy contender. Team A - Rakhi, Akshay, Apurva, Prasad, and Snehlata Team B - Amruta Dh, Amruta De, Kiran, Vikas and Aroh
Week 10	Result	Winner (Main task) – Snehlata & Kiran
Week 10	Result	Failed (Main task) – Everyone else
Week 10	Captaincy contenders	Snehlata and Kiran
Week 10	Captaincy task	Captaincy was dissolved as contenders had tied
Week 10	House Captain	None
Week 10	Exits	On Day 70, Snehlata Vasaikar was evicted after facing public votes.
Week 11	Nomination	In the nomination task, the contestants had to go to the secret room & keep the nomination secret. Bigg Boss divided the contestants into the team of three members & one contestant had to nominate two contestants from two separate teams. The teams were - 1) Apurva-Akshay-Prasad 2) Rakhi-Amruta De-Kiran 3) Vikas-Amruta Dh-Aroh As a result, Prasad, Apurva, Vikas, Kiran, Amruta De & Amruta Dh were nominated.
Week 11	Main task	Bigg Boss welcome Pushkar Jog and Sonalee Kulkarni as guests to promote film Victoria. Bigg Boss announced the task two contestants will sit in the chair & will be tied with chains on their legs, & other contestants have to break the chain and released the locked contestants.
Week 11	Result	Winner (Main task) – None
Week 11	Result	Failed (Main task) – None
Week 11	Punishment	Rakhi Sawant breaks plates and cups as her coffee gets stolen. Bigg Boss later punished Rakhi for destroying the property and getting violent in the house and directly nominated her for eviction for the next week.
Week 11	House Captain	None
Week 11	Exits	On Day 77, Vikas Sawant and Amruta Deshmukh was evicted after facing public votes.
Week 12	Nomination	Times Up Bigg Boss announced a nomination task Times Up. Bigg Boss asked the contestants to nominate any contestant they want to be in the house. Bigg Boss also announced everyone not to nominate Rakhi as she already nominated by Bigg Boss as a punishment. As a result, Prasad, Aroh & Rakhi were nominated.
Week 12	Main task	Freeze Release Bigg Boss announced this week as a family week. Family members and relatives of the contestants have started entering the house to surprise them. Firstly, Amruta Dh's, then Apurva's, Kiran's, Akshay's, Prasad's, Aroh's and Rakhi's family members entered the house and praised all contestants for their performances.
Week 12	Captaincy contenders	Akshay, Amruta Dh, Apurva, Aroh, Kiran, Prasad & Rakhi
Week 12	Captaincy task	The last captaincy task was related to the winning prize money amount. As per the task, Bigg Boss appointed all contestants as the captaincy contenders and gave them the nameplates of their names. Bigg Boss informed all contestants that the winning prize amount is 25 Lakhs and after every seconds the prize amount will be deducted by 50,000. If contestants do not want to lose the winning amount they have to drop their captaincy for next week by putting their nameplates inside the ATM. One contestant had to put his/her nameplate in the machine in each round & hit the buzzer & only then the deduction will get stopped.
Week 12	House Captain	Aroh Welankar
Week 12	Exits	On Day 84, No eviction took place
Week 13	Nomination	Vaghoba Ala Re Vaghoba Ala (Tiger Came) As per the task, the contestants had to throw pictures of the contestants they wanted to nominate in a Tiger's cage by considering the previous week's performance. The contestants who will get nomination several times will get directly nominated for eviction. As a result, Prasad, Amruta Dh and Rakhi were nominated.
Week 13	Ticket To Finale Contenders task	Gajar Palva, Umedvari Milva (Run the carrot, Get the contendership) Bigg Boss announced the final 'Ticket To Finale' task of the season. Bigg Boss asked the housemates to participate in the task individually and named the task as 'Gajar Palva Umedvari Milva'. As per the task, the contestants will get one basket of Gajar (carrots) in each round and they have to run to get as many carrots as possible in their bucket after the buzzer. The contestants, who will have more carrots in a good condition, will get qualified for the next round. The contestants, who will have fewer carrots compared to others, will get eliminated from the Ticket To Finale task. The Sanchalak of the task has to eliminate one contestant in each round.
Week 13	Result	Winner (Ticket to finale contenders task) – Akshay, Apurva, Kiran and Aroh
Week 13	Result	Failed (Ticket to finale contenders task) - Amruta Dh, Prasad and Rakhi
Week 13	Ticket to Finale contenders	Akshay, Apurva, Kiran and Aroh
Week 13	Ticket to Finale task	Bigg Boss announced Ticket to Finale task to the contestants. As per the task, each contenders was given a container filled with grains. The task was to save the grains in the own container and attack the other container. The container who have maximum grains after the buzzer wins the game. Rakhi, Prasad and Amruta Dh was the sanchalak of the task.
Week 13	Result	Winner (Ticket to finale) – Apurva
Week 13	Result	Failed (Ticket to finale) - Akshay, Kiran and Aroh
Week 13	Exits	On Day 91, Prasad Jawade was evicted after facing Public votes.
Week 14; Finale Week
Week 14; Finale Week	Nomination	Everyone was nominated for the mid-week eviction except Apurva as she won the Ticket To Finale.
Week 14; Finale Week	Happenings	BB Journey; Bigg Boss has shown the journeys of finalists which started from Amruta Dh, Rakhi, Kiran, Aroh, Apurva & Akshay
Week 14; Finale Week	Exits	On day 94, Aroh Welankar was evicted after facing public votes.
Week 14; Finale Week	Grand Finale Day 98	
Week 14; Finale Week	Walked, 4th Runner Up	Rakhi Sawant
Week 14; Finale Week	3rd Runner Up	Amruta Dhongade
Week 14; Finale Week	2nd Runner Up	Kiran Mane
Week 14; Finale Week	1st Runner Up	Apurva Nemlekar
Week 14; Finale Week	Winner	Akshay Kelkar

== Guest appearances ==
Week(s)	Day(s)	Guest(s)	Purpose of Visits	Ref.
Week 1	Grand Launch	Isha Mane	To support her father Kiran Mane	
Week 1	Grand Launch	Jayendra Kelkar	To support his son Akshay Kelkar	
Week 1	Grand Launch	Supriya Nemlekar	To support her daughter Apurva Nemlekar	
Week 1	Grand Launch	Mrs. Marathe	To support his son Trishul Marathe	
Week 1	Day 5	Ravindra Khomane	For Garba celebration	
Week 1	Day 5	Anshika Chonkar	For Garba celebration	
Week 1	Day 6	Shreyas Talpade	To promote film Aapdi Thaapdi	
Week 4	Day 22	Sunil Dabbawala	To gave Diwali Faral Dabba	
Week 4	Day 22	Vishnu Dabbawala	To gave Diwali Faral Dabba	
Week 4	Day 23	Tanvi Mundle	For special task	
Week 4	Day 23	Vivek Sangle	For special task	
Week 4	Day 24	Amruta Fadnavis	For Diwali celebration	
Week 5	Day 35	Jitendra Joshi	To promote film Godavari	
Week 6	Day 39	Jitendra Joshi	To entertaining housemates	
Week 6	Day 40	Mahesh Manjrekar	To enjoy meal with housemates	
Week 6	Day 42	Shweta Shinde	To promote serial Shetkarich Navra Hava	
Week 6	Day 42	Pradeep Ghule	To promote serial Shetkarich Navra Hava	
Week 6	Day 42	Rucha Gaikwad	To promote serial Shetkarich Navra Hava	
Week 8	Day 56	Sayali Sanjeev	To promote film Goshta Eka Paithanichi	
Week 8	Day 56	Suvrat Joshi	To promote film Goshta Eka Paithanichi	
Week 8	Day 56	Shantanu Rode	To promote film Goshta Eka Paithanichi	
Week 9	Day 61	Siddhartha Jadhav	To promote film Baalbhaarti	
Week 11	Day 74	Pushkar Jog	To promote film Victoria - Ek Rahasya	
Week 11	Day 74	Sonalee Kulkarni	To promote film Victoria - Ek Rahasya	
Week 11	Day 75	Bharat Jadhav	To promote film Dhondi Champya - Ek Prem Katha	
Week 11	Day 75	Vaibhav Mangle	To promote film Dhondi Champya - Ek Prem Katha	
Week 12	Day 84	Riteish Deshmukh	To promote film Ved	
Week 12	Day 84	Genelia D'Souza	To promote film Ved	
Week 13	Day 89	Tejaswini Lonari	To meet top 7 contestants	
Week 13	Day 89	Smita Gondkar	For special task	
Week 13	Day 89	Neha Shitole	For special task	
Week 13	Day 89	Utkarsh Shinde	For special task	
Week 14	Day 95	RJ Rudra	For interacting with housemates	
Week 14	Day 95	RJ Nidhi	For interacting with housemates	
Week 14	Day 95	RJ Kedar	For interacting with housemates	
Week 14	Day 95	RJ Purva	For interacting with housemates	
Week 14	Day 96	Varun Inamdar	To enjoy meal with housemates	
Week 14	Day 96	Ashish Pawar	To entertaining housemates	
Week 14	Day 96	Onkar Bhojane	To entertaining housemates	
Week 14	Day 96	Bhushan Kadu	To entertaining housemates	
Week 14	Day 97-98	Ex-housemates	To meet housemates	
Week 14	Day 98	Vikas Patil	To carry out eviction	
Week 14	Day 98	Aishwarya Shete	To promote serial Rama Raghav	
Week 14	Day 98	Nikhil Damle	To promote serial Rama Raghav	
Week 14	Day 98	Rasika Vakharkar	To promote serial Pirticha Vanva Uri Petla	
Week 14	Day 98	Indraneel Kamat	To promote serial Pirticha Vanva Uri Petla	

== Nomination table ==
	Week 1	Week 2		Week 3	Week 4	Week 5		Week 6		Week 7	Week 8	Week 9	Week 10	Week 11		Week 12	Week 13	Week 14			
	Week 1	Week 2		Week 3	Week 4	Week 5		Week 6		Week 7	Week 8	Week 9	Week 10	Week 11		Week 12	Week 13	Day 95	Day 98		
Nominees for Captaincy	No Captain	Samruddhi; Tejaswini		Akshay; Rohit	Apurva; Tejaswini	Akshay; Vikas		Samruddhi; Yashashri		Kiran; Rohit	Amruta Dh; Vikas	Rohit; Tejaswini	Akshay; Apurva; Aroh; Kiran; Mira; Rakhi; Vikas; Vishal	Snehlata; Kiran		No Captain	Akshay; Apurva; Amruta Dh; Aroh; Kiran; Prasad; Rakhi	No; Captain			
House Captain	No Captain	Samruddhi		Rohit	Apurva	Akshay		Samruddhi		Rohit	No; Captain		Akshay	No; Captain		No Captain	Aroh	No; Captain			
Captain's Nominations	No Captain	Akshay; Apurva; Megha; Rohit; Ruchira; Trishul; Yashashri	Amruta De; Yogesh; Amruta Dh; Prasad; Kiran; Nikhil; Vikas; Tejaswini	Not eligible	Yogesh; Prasad; Kiran; Amruta De	Samruddhi; Vikas; Prasad; Yashashri (to evict); Yashashri (to save)		Not eligible		Not eligible	No; Captain		Aroh; Snehlata; Vikas; Prasad; Apurva	No; Captain		No Captain	Prasad; Amruta Dh	No; Captain			
Vote to:	Evict	Save	Evict			Evict/Save		Evict													
Akshay	Not eligible	Rohit; Apurva; Amruta Dh; Yogesh	Kiran; Tejaswini; Megha; Trishul	~~Amruta Dh~~	Kiran; Amruta De; Trishul; Vikas	A	House; Captain	A	Prasad; Ruchira; Amruta Dh; Tejaswini	Tejaswini; Kiran; Amruta De; Yashashri; Prasad	~~Tejaswini~~	Not eligible	House; Captain	C	Kiran; Vikas	Aroh; Prasad	Prasad; Rakhi	Nominated	Winner (Day 98)		
Apurva	Not eligible	Tejaswini; Akshay; Megha; Trishul	Amruta Dh; Rohit; Amruta De; Yogesh	~~Ruchira~~	House; Captain	A	Ruchira (to save)	A	Prasad; Ruchira; Amruta Dh; Tejaswini	Amruta De; Yashashri; Amruta Dh	Prasad	Not eligible	Nominated	C	Amruta De; Vikas	Aroh; Prasad	Prasad; Amruta Dh	Nominated	1st runner-up (Day 98)		
Kiran	Not eligible	Vikas; Amruta Dh; Prasad; Tejaswini	Apurva; Megha; Trishul; Akshay	~~Tejaswini~~	Yogesh; Prasad; Trishul; Vikas	A	Trishul; Ruchira (to evict)	A	Prasad; Ruchira; Amruta Dh; Tejaswini	Amruta De; Yashashri; Prasad	Amruta De	Not eligible	Safe	A	Amruta Dh; Apurva	Prasad; Aroh	Prasad; Amruta Dh	Nominated	2nd runner-up (Day 98)		
Amruta Dh	Not eligible	Tejaswini; Kiran; Nikhil; Amruta De	Akshay; Apurva; Rohit; Trishul	Apurva	Trishul; Vikas; Kiran; Amruta De	A	Not eligible	B	Yashashri; Snehlata	Kiran; Prasad	~~Amruta De~~	Not eligible	Safe	B	Amruta De; Prasad	Aroh; Kiran	Prasad; Rakhi	Nominated	3rd runner-up (Day 98)		
Rakhi	Not In House											Prasad	Safe	A	Vikas; Apurva	Amruta Dh; Apurva	Amruta Dh; Prasad	Nominated	Walked, 4th runner-up (Day 98)		
Aroh	Not In House											Apurva	Nominated	B	Kiran; Akshay	Apurva; Amruta Dh	House; Captain	Nominated	Evicted (Day 94)		
Prasad	Amruta De; Yashashri; Tejaswini	Kiran; Yashashri; Yogesh; Rohit	Akshay; Apurva; Ruchira; Tejaswini	~~Trishul~~	Trishul; Vikas; Kiran; Amruta De	B	Vikas (to save); Amruta De (to evict)	B	Yashashri; Snehlata	Tejaswini; Amruta De; Yashashri; Amruta Dh	~~Amruta Dh~~	Not eligible	Nominated	C	Amruta De; Amruta Dh	Kiran; Aroh	Amruta Dh; Rakhi	Evicted (Day 91)			
Amruta De	Not eligible	Ruchira; Akshay; Apurva; Amruta Dh	Nikhil; Kiran; Yogesh; Megha	Megha	Yogesh; Prasad; Trishul; Vikas	A	Not eligible	A	Prasad; Ruchira; Amruta Dh; Tejaswini	Kiran; Amruta Dh	Samruddhi	Not eligible	Safe	A	Amruta Dh; Prasad	Evicted (Day 77)					
Vikas	Not eligible	Trishul; Nikhil; Kiran; Yogesh	Apurva; Megha; Tejaswini; Ruchira	~~Samruddhi~~	Kiran; Amruta De; Yogesh; Prasad	A	Not eligible	B	Yashashri; Snehlata	Not eligible	Akshay	Not eligible	Nominated	B	Prasad; Amruta De	Evicted (Day 76)					
Snehlata	Not In House					B	Vikas; Kiran; Samruddhi; Amruta Dh (to evict)	A	Prasad; Ruchira; Amruta Dh; Tejaswini	Tejaswini; Amruta Dh	Rohit	Not eligible	Nominated	Evicted (Day 70)							
Rohit	Vikas; Amruta De; Nikhil	Ruchira; Trishul; Akshay; Amruta De	Yogesh; Yashashri; Nikhil; Amruta Dh	House; Captain	Kiran; Amruta De; Trishul; Vikas	B	Not eligible	B	Yashashri; Snehlata	House; Captain	~~Vikas~~	Not eligible	Evicted (Day 63)								
Vishal	Not In House											Rohit	Duration Complete (Day 63)								
Mira	Not In House											Amruta De	Duration Complete (Day 63)								
Tejaswini	Not eligible	Amruta Dh; Yogesh; Nikhil; Vikas	Ruchira; Akshay; Prasad; Amruta De	~~Vikas~~	Kiran; Amruta De; Trishul; Vikas	B	Not eligible	B	Yashashri; Snehlata	Kiran; Amruta De; Yashashri; Amruta Dh; Prasad	Apurva	Not eligible	Walked (Day 58)								
Samruddhi	Not eligible	House Captain		~~Yogesh~~	Kiran; Amruta De; Trishul; Vikas	A	Not eligible	House Captain		Tejaswini; Kiran; Prasad	~~Snehlata~~	Evicted (Day 56)									
Yashashri	Not eligible	Trishul; Megha; Tejaswini; Kiran	Amruta Dh; Rohit; Yogesh; Akshay	Amruta De	Kiran; Amruta De; Trishul; Vikas	B	Samruddhi (to save)	A	Prasad; Ruchira; Amruta Dh; Tejaswini	Tejaswini	Evicted (Day 49)										
Ruchira	Not eligible	Nikhil; Megha; Apurva; Prasad	Rohit; Kiran; Yashashri; Amruta De	Yashashri	Trishul; Vikas; Kiran; Amruta De	B	Not eligible	B	Yashashri; Snehlata	Evicted (Day 42)											
Trishul	Nikhil; Vikas; Amruta De	Tejaswini; Akshay; Apurva; Amruta De	Nikhil; Yogesh; Prasad; Rohit	~~Akshay~~	Kiran; Amruta De; Yogesh; Prasad	B	Not eligible	Evicted (Day 35)													
Yogesh	Not eligible	Megha; Amruta Dh; Nikhil; Prasad	Akshay; Rohit; Trishul; Tejaswini	~~Prasad~~	Trishul; Vikas; Kiran; Amruta De	Evicted (Day 28)															
Megha	Amruta De; Nikhil; Yogesh	Yogesh; Apurva; Akshay; Trishul	Vikas; Amruta Dh; Prasad; Ruchira	Kiran	Evicted (Day 21)																
Nikhil	Not eligible	Rohit; Yashashri; Amruta Dh; Vikas	Apurva; Trishul; Prasad; Ruchira	Evicted (Day 14)																	
Notes	1	2		3	4	5, 6		7		8, 9	3, 10	11, 12, 13	14	15		16	-				
Against Public Voting	Amruta De; Nikhil; Vikas; Yogesh; Tejaswini; Yashashri	Akshay; Amruta De; Amruta Dh; Nikhil; Rohit; Ruchira; Vikas; Yogesh		Amruta De; Apurva; Kiran; Megha; Yashashri	Amruta De; Kiran; Prasad; Trishul; Vikas; Yogesh	Amruta De; Amruta Dh; Kiran; Prasad; Samruddhi; Trishul; Vikas		Amruta Dh; Prasad; Ruchira; Snehlata; Tejaswini; Yashashri		Amruta De; Amruta Dh; Kiran; Prasad; Tejaswini; Yashashri	Akshay; Amruta De; Apurva; Prasad; Rohit; Samruddhi	Amruta De; Apurva; Prasad; Rohit	Apurva; Aroh; Prasad; Snehlata; Vikas	Amruta De; Amruta Dh; Apurva; Kiran; Prasad; Vikas		Rakhi; Prasad; Aroh	Amruta Dh; Prasad; Rakhi	Akshay; Amruta Dh; Aroh; Kiran; Rakhi	Akshay; Amruta Dh; Apurva; Kiran; Rakhi		
Secret Room	None									Kiran	None	None	None						None		
Walked	None									None	None	Tejaswini	None						Rakhi		
Evicted	No; Eviction	Nikhil		Megha	Yogesh	Trishul		Ruchira		Yashashri	Samruddhi	Rohit	Snehlata	Vikas		No; Eviction	Prasad	Aroh	Amruta Dh	Kiran	
Evicted	No; Eviction	Nikhil		Megha	Yogesh	Trishul		Ruchira		Yashashri	Samruddhi	Rohit	Snehlata	Amruta De		No; Eviction	Prasad	Aroh		Apurva	Akshay

indicates the House Captain.
indicates the Nominees for house captaincy.
indicates that the Housemate was directly nominated for eviction prior to the regular nominations process.
indicates that the housemate went to secret room.
indicates that the Housemate was granted immunity from nominations.
indicates the winner.
indicates the first runner up.
indicates the second runner up.
indicates the third runner up.
indicates the fourth runner up.
indicates the contestant has been walked out of the show.
indicates the contestant has been evicted.

=== Notes ===
- ^Note 1: After being chosen as the "useless" housemates, only Megha, Prasad, Rohit and Trishul could nominate other housemates and were also granted immunity.
- ^Note 2: During Week 2 nominations, Bigg Boss had arranged two train sections, green and red on the board. In green section, the contestants had to put the names of contestants they wanted to save and in the red section, the contestants had to put the names of contestants they wanted to nominate.
- ^Note 3: During Week 3 nominations, Bigg Boss assigned one housemate to each housemate and they had to decide if they want to nominate the housemate assigned to them.
- ^Note 4:During Week 4 nominations, Bigg Boss divided the housemates into 6 teams. Each team had to nominate two other teams. The teams were: Kiran & Amruta De, Yogesh & Prasad, Samruddhi & Yashashri, Trishul & Vikas, Ruchira & Amruta Dh, Rohit, Tejaswini & Akshay. House-Captain, Apurva nominated two teams.
- ^Note 5: Snehlata was immuned as she entered as a Wild-Card on Day 28.
- ^Note 6: During Week 5 nominations, Bigg Boss divided the housemates into 2 teams. Each team had to race to get either safety potions or nomination potions. If the get safety potion, they get to safe a housemate from the other team. If they get nomination potion, they get to nominate a housemate from the other team.
- ^Note 7: During Week 6 nominations, Bigg Boss divided the housemates into 2 teams. In each round, 2 teams competed, they winning team mutually get to nominate a housemate from the other team.
- ^Note 8: During Week 7 nominations, Bigg Boss calls 2 housemates. Other housemates will race to enter the box, the first five to enter are eligible to judge and mutually decide to nominate 1 of the 2 housemates called by Bigg Boss.
- ^Note 9: On Day 49, Kiran was fake evicted from the house and entered the secret room.
- ^Note 10: After Week 8 nominations, Kiran had a special power to directly nominate one housemate.
- ^Note 11: Only the 4 challengers got to directly nominate a housemate each.
- ^Note 12: On Day 58, Tejaswini left due to her injury.
- ^Note 13: On Day 63, Vishal and Mira were revealed as Guest housemates and left the BB house.
- ^Note 14: Only the Captain Akshay got to nominate 5 housemates.
- ^Note 15: For Week 11 nominations, Bigg Boss divided the housemates into 3 teams. Each housemate had to nominate 1 housemate from 2 other teams.
- ^Note 16: Bigg Boss nominated Rakhi for Week 12 as a punishment.
