= Amruta Deshmukh =

Indian television actress

- Born: 31 January; Jalgaon, Maharashtra, India
- Occupation: Actress
- Years active: 2013–present
- Known for: Freshers; Bigg Boss Marathi 4
- Spouse: Prasad Jawade (m. 2023)
- Relatives: Abhishek Deshmukh (brother)

Amruta Deshmukh is an Indian television actress. She made her television debut with the Tumcha Aamcha Same Asta serial on Star Pravah. She is known for her performance in Freshers as Pari. Currently, she has participated in Bigg Boss Marathi 4 as a contestant.

== Early life ==
She was born in Jalgaon, Maharashtra. She is the younger sister of Marathi television actor Abhishek Deshmukh who played a role in Star Pravah's Aai Kuthe Kay Karte!.

== Personal life ==
Deshmukh has been in a relationship with Prasad Jawade, a fellow contestant of Bigg Boss Marathi. They got married on 18 November 2023.

== Career ==
She graduated from the Ranade Institute of Mass Communication and Journalism, Pune. Due to cultural interest, she acted in a few theatres plays. She also participated in Miss Pune Festival. Then she started acting in television serials and short films. She is also a Radio jockey for 98.3 Mirchi Pune.

== Filmography ==
=== Films ===
Year	Title	Role	Ref.
2013	Baburaola Pakda		
2013	Kalakaar		
2014	The Beloved	Niru	
2018	Ek Kutub Teen Minar	Soni	
2018	Aaji Ani Naat		
2018	Pathrakhin Mazi Aai Lakshmi		
2019	1.43 FM (Short film)		
2020	Sweety Satarkar	Sweety	

=== Television ===
Year	Title	Role	Channel	Ref.
2013	Pudhcha Paaul	Small cameo	Star Pravah	
2014	Asmita	Vaidehi Saranjame	Zee Marathi	
2015-2016	Tumcha Aamcha Same Asta	Gauri	Star Pravah	
2016-2017	Freshers	Pari Deshmukh	Zee Yuva	
2018	Deva Shappath	Goddess Lakshmi	Zee Yuva	
2019-2020	Mi Tujhich Re	Riya Varde	Sony Marathi	
2020	Aathshe Khidkya Naushe Dara	Sara	Sony Marathi	
2022	Bigg Boss Marathi 4	Contestant	Colors Marathi	
