= Abeer Gulal =

2024 Indian Marathi language TV series

- Genre: Drama; Soap opera
- Starring: See below
- Country of origin: India
- Original language: Marathi
- No. of episodes: 179

Production
- Producer: Gul Khan
- Camera setup: Multi-camera
- Running time: 22 minutes
- Production company: 4 Lions Films

Original release
- Network: Colors Marathi
- Release: 27 May – 24 November 2024

Related
- Lakshana

Abeer Gulal is an Indian Marathi language television series which is produced by Gul Khan under the banner of 4 Lions Films. The series premiered from 27 May 2024 by replacing Kavyanjali – Sakhi Savali which aired on Colors Marathi. It stars Akshay Kelkar, Gayatri Datar and Payal Jadhav in lead roles. It is an official remake of Kannada TV series Lakshana. It ended on 24 November 2024 completing 179 episodes.

== Plot ==
Shree and Shubhra, swapped at birth, face a life-altering revelation when the nurse responsible awakens from a coma. As they grapple with their newfound identities, fate intertwines their paths through Agastya, a wealthy hotelier's son seeking local cuisine knowledge. Living together, they confront their pasts, bridging divides and embracing their true selves amidst swirling complexities.

== Cast ==
=== Main ===
- Akshay Kelkar as Agastya Nimbalkar
- Gayatri Datar as Shubhra Gaikwad
- Payal Jadhav as Shree Deshmukh

=== Recurring ===
- Shubhangi Latkar as Sulakshana Nimbalkar
- Nilpari Khanwalkar
- Surabhi Bhave-Damle
- Abhinay Sawant
- Sandesh Jadhav
- Sheetal Kulkarni
- Nikita Bandavane
- Kalpana Sarang
- Manoj Takne

== Adaptations ==
Language	Title	Original release	Network(s)	Last aired	Notes
Kannada	Lakshana ಲಕ್ಷಣ	9 August 2021	Colors Kannada	7 October 2023	Original
Marathi	Abeer Gulal अबीर गुलाल	27 May 2024	Colors Marathi	24 November 2024	Remake
