= Ladachi Mi Lek Ga! =

Indian Marathi series

- Genre: Family drama
- Screenplay by: Ambar Hadap
- Story by: Vishal Gupta
- Directed by: Swapnil Murkar; Maruti Desai
- Starring: See below
- Theme music composer: Nilesh Moharir
- Opening theme: Ladachi Mi Lek Ga! by Shalmali Sukhtankar
- Country of origin: India
- Original language: Marathi
- No. of episodes: 201

Production
- Producer: Vishal Gupta
- Camera setup: Multi-camera
- Running time: 22 minutes
- Production company: Aar Entertainment Enterprises

Original release
- Network: Zee Marathi
- Release: 14 September 2020 – 30 April 2021

Ladachi Mi Lek Ga! is an Indian Marathi-language television series which aired on Zee Marathi. It is produced by Vishal Gupta under the banner of Aar Entertainment Enterprises. It starred Mitali Mayekar and Aroh Welankar in lead roles. It premiered from 14 September 2020 by replacing Mrs. Mukhyamantri.

== Synopsis ==
The show is mixture of romance and hatred. Kasturi, a nurse hails from a humble background, marries Saurabh, a doctor. Their happy marriage is the calm before the storm as Kasturi fails to realize that Saurabh's mother is waiting to pounce on her.

== Cast ==
=== Main ===
- Mitali Mayekar as Kasturi Hanumant Lokhande / Kasturi Saurabh Satam
- Aroh Welankar as Saurabh Pratap Satam

=== Recurring ===
Kasturi's family

- Umesh Jagtap as Hanumant Lokhande - Kasturi's father
- Rohan Surve as Vijay Hanumant Lokhande - Kasturi's brother
- Rajshri Nikam as Lakshmi Hanumant Lokhande - Kasturi's mother

Saurabh's family

- Smita Tambe as Kamini Pratap Satam (Mummy) - Saurabh's mother
- Vandana Marathe as Saurabh's grandmother
- Ramesh Rokade as Pratap Satam (Bhai) - Saurabh's father
- Anupama Takmoghe as Kala - Saurabh's aunt

Others

- Milind Pemgirikar as Shiva - Mummy's right hand
- Aakanksha Gade as Sindhu - Saurabh's friend
- Sonal Pawar as Prajakta - Vijay's girlfriend
- Vedangi Kulkarni as Vini - Kasturi's friend
