= Mitali Mayekar =

Indian actress

Mitali Mayekar-Chandekar
- Born: Mitali Mayekar; 11 September 1996 (age 29); Mumbai, Maharashtra, India
- Occupation: Actress
- Years active: 2008—present
- Spouse: Siddharth Chandekar (m. 2021)

Mitali Mayekar-Chandekar (born 11 September 1996) is an Indian Marathi television and film actress. At the age of 13, She debut in the acting industry with Irrfan Khan's movie Billu in 2009.

== Personal life ==
Mitali was in a romantic relationship with Siddharth Chandekar, who is also an actor. They tied the knot on 24 th January 2021.

== Career ==
Before work as an young, she worked before as a child actor in Irrfan Khan's film Billu. She played the role of daughter of Irrfan Khan. She has also done supporting roles in Marathi television shows such as Asambhav, Anubandh, Bhagyalakshmi, Unch Majha Zoka and Tu Majha Saangaati. She did her film debut with Urfi Marathi movie as a lead. In 2016, she played a role of Sayali Bankar in Freshers series. Currently, she appeared in Ladachi Mi Lek Ga! series.

== Filmography ==
=== Films ===
Year	Title	Role	Ref.
2009	Billu	Gunja	
2015	Urfi	Amruta	
2016	Yaari Dosti	Rani	
2019	Aamhi Befikar	Bhargavi	
2019	Smile Please	Special appearance in song Chal Pudhe	
2021	Hashtag Prem	Sanika Kulkarni	
2025	Fussclass Dabhade	Madhuri	

=== Television ===
Year	Show	Role	Ref.
2008	Asambhav	Piyu	
2009	Anubandh	Malvika	
2010	Bhagyalakshmi	Bayo	
2012-2013	Unch Majha Zoka	Ahilya	
2014-2015	Tu Majha Saangaati	Supporting role	
2016-2017	Freshers	Sayali Bankar	
2018	Maharashtracha Favourite Dancer	Contestant	
2020-2021	Ladachi Mi Lek Ga!	Kasturi Satam	

=== Web series ===
Year	Title	Role	Platform	Notes
2019	Sex Drugs and Theatre	Rewa	ZEE5	
