= Lakshana (TV series) =

Indian television drama

- Genre: Drama
- Screenplay by: Somu Hoysala
- Directed by: Shivram Magadi
- Creative director: Jaganath.C
- Starring: Jaganth.C; Vijayalakshmi; Sukrutha Nag
- Opening theme: Lakshadalli Oballu Lakshana
- Composer: Manikanth Kadri
- Country of origin: India
- Original language: Kannada
- No. of episodes: 536

Production
- Producer: Jaganath.C
- Production location: Bengaluru
- Cinematography: Kiran
- Editor: Manu
- Camera setup: Multi-camera
- Running time: 22 minutes
- Production company: Rapid Live Private Entertainments Pvt Ltd

Original release
- Network: Colors Kannada
- Release: 9 August 2021 – 7 October 2023

Lakshana is an Indian television drama in the Kannada language which premiered on Colors Kannada from 9 August 2021. It stars Jaganath.C, Vijayalakshmi and Sukrutha Nag in the lead roles.

== Summary ==
The story revolves around the lives of two girls Nakshatra and Shwetha who are exchanged in the hospital 23 years back by doctor Tulsi. Nakshatra is a dusky brown colour girl who works hard to meet the daily expenditures of the family. She has been not accepted as the daughter and granddaughter by her father Thukarama and his mother as she is not fair. He feels that Nakshatra is not his daughter as he and his wife Jaya are fair complexioned and she is in dark complexion. Bhupathi the owner of MPR Foods and S/O Shakuntala Devi is staying as a PG guest in Nkashatra's house for rent disclosing his real identity. Nakshatra who dreams of becoming TV anchor is pushed back as her skin tone will not match the requirements of an anchor. Finally she does manage to land a job as RJ where she is only the voice, while Shwetha, is the face of the show. Trouble begins when Bhupathi falls in love with her voice, while believing that it's Shwetha's.The way how Nakshatra and Shwetha meet their real parents and how Bhupathi falls in love with Nkshatra form the rest of the story.

== Cast ==
=== Main ===
- Jaganath.C as Bhupathi: CEO of MPR Foods; Shakuntala Devi's third son
- Vijayalakshmi as Nakshatra: Dusky Beauty Girl
- Sukrutha Nag as Shwetha: Owner of SFM

=== Recurring ===
- Sudha Belawadi as Shakuntala Devi: Owner of MPR foods; Shourya, Prithvi, Bhupathi, Mourya's mother
- Roycott.S as Tukaram: Nakshatra / Shwetha & Shrushti's father
- Bhagyashri Rao as Jaya Srishti: Nakshatra / Shwetha's mother
- Archana Udupa as Dr. Tulsi: who has exchanged Nakshtra and Shwetha 23 years ago
- Sacchin Thimmaiah as Shourya: Bhupathi's first elder brother; Shakuntala Devi's first son
- Rashmi as Mayuri: Bhupathi's first elder sister-in-law; Shourya's wife; Shakuntala Devi's first daughter-in-law
- Jeevika as daughter of Shourya and Mayuri
- Krish as Prithvi: Bhupathi's second elder brother; Shakuntala Devi's second son
- Abhishek Shrikanth as Mourya: Shakuntala Devi's youngest son
- Sara as Shierly: Bhupathi's 2nd elder sister-in-law; Prithvi's wife; Shakuntala Devi's second daughter-in-law
- JK Mysore as Munna: Shakuntala devi assistant
- Keerthi Bhanu as Chandrashekhar (CS): Nakshatra / Shwetha's father
- Deepa Iyer as Aarthi: Nakshatra / Shwetha's mother
- Priya Shatasharman as Bhargavi: Nakshatra / Shwetha's aunt
- Shruthi Ramesh as Milli: Shwetha's manager
- Uma dikshith as Seethalakshmi: Tukaram's mother Nakshatra / Shwetha's grandmother
- Ashwini as Srishti: Nakshatra's sister; Thukaram's daughter
- Anup as Srishti's son
- Vaishnavi Gowda as Vaishnavi

== Adaptations ==
Language	Title	Original release	Network(s)	Last aired	Notes
Kannada	Lakshana ಲಕ್ಷಣ	9 August 2021	Colors Kannada	7 October 2023	Original
Marathi	Abeer Gulal अबीर गुलाल	27 May 2024	Colors Marathi	24 November 2024	Remake
