= Ratris Khel Chale =

Indian TV series

- The poster of Season 1 of the serial
- Genre: Thriller; Drama; Horror
- Screenplay by: Pralhad Kudtarkar
- Story by: Santosh Ayachit; Ashutosh Parandkar
- Directed by: Raju Sawant
- Starring: See below
- Theme music composer: Pankaj Padghan
- Opening theme: "Ratris Khel Chale" by Sayali Pankaj
- Country of origin: India
- Original languages: Marathi; Malvani
- No. of seasons: 3
- No. of episodes: 210

Production
- Producers: Sunil Bhosale; Santosh Ayachit
- Running time: 22 minutes
- Production company: Sajiri Creations

Original release
- Network: Zee Marathi
- Release: 22 February – 22 October 2016

Related
- Ratris Khel Chale 2 Ratris Khel Chale 3

Ratris Khel Chale (transl. The Game Runs At Night) is a Marathi and Malvani supernatural thriller drama serial which aired on Zee Marathi from 22 February 2016. The serial revolves around the Naik family talking in Malvani and living in Sawantwadi, who experience strange and unexplainable events.

== Series ==
Season	Episodes	Originally Broadcast	
Season	Episodes	First aired	Last aired
1	210	22 February 2016	22 October 2016
2	413	14 January 2019	27 March 2020
2	413	20 July 2020	29 August 2020
3	238	22 March 2021	30 April 2021
3	238	16 August 2021	9 April 2022

== Plot ==
Hari "Anna" Naik, head of an influential Malvani family, abruptly dies on the day of his youngest son's engagement. This leads to household issues over property distribution between the heirs, especially due to Sushma "Sushlya", Anna's illegitimate daughter from another woman, Shevanta. Also, the household witnesses strange paranormal events and mysteries, which some believe to be supernatural, while others believe to be tricks.

Anna's right hand Natha and his wife Yamuna create paranormal events to scare the Naiks and usurp their property. Also, Sushma creates problems and haunts up events in the Naik house to retrieve her inheritance rights as well as Shevanta's jewellery. All heirs to Anna's property try to get the largest share of the property.

Neelima creates haunting scenes to get Anna's property as per her commitment to her boss, for her salary. Also, Anna's friends Nene Vakil, a lawyer, and Raghu Kaka, a priest with an evil mind and evil deeds, set their eyes on Anna's property, so they too scare the family. Neelima and her boss Jatin Sheth assassinate Nene Vakil as he learns their truth.

== Cast ==
- Shakuntala Nare as Indumati "Mai" Hari Naik, Anna's kind hearted widow. Madhav, Chhaya, and Abhiram's mother, Datta's adopted mother and Sushma's stepmother, Neelima, Sarita, and Devika's mother-in-law, and Archis, Purva, and Ganesh's grandmother.
- Suhas Shirsat as Dattaram "Datta" Hari Naik, Anna's second child and son from an unseen mistress of Anna's but still raised as Indu's own, the most responsible member of the Naik family after Anna. Sarita's husband, Purva and Ganesh's father, the unseen mistress' biological son.
- Mangesh Salvi as Madhav Hari Naik, Anna's eldest child and son who moves to Mumbai for work. Neelima's husband and Archis' father. He is an imaginative man who dabbles in poetry and novel writing, most of whose plots often come true with the Naik family.
- Ashwini Mukadam as Sarita Dattaram Naik, the only second generation mistress in the house to lovingly take care of the Naik house. Datta's wife, and Purva and Ganesh's mother.
- Prachi Sukhathankar as Neelima Madhav Naik, Madhav's spouse who is highly scientific and disregards any superstitions of the native villagers. Madhav's wife and Archis' mother. She and her boss assassinated Nene Vakil for Anna's property.
- Madhav Abhyankar as Hari "Anna" Naik, a formidable elderly man as well as the most influential person in the village. Indumati's husband. Madhav, Chhaya, Abhiram, Datta and Sushma's father.Pandu's adoptive father.
- Sainkeet Kamat as Abhiram Hari Naik, Anna's youngest child and son whose engagement was planned but postponed after Anna died on the same day. Devika's husband.
- Rutuja Dharmadhikari as Sushma "Sushlya" Hari Naik, Shevanta's daughter through Anna who wants seize the Naik family's entire estate as a desire of her late mother after Anna's death. She was disowned by her stepmother Indumati after Shevanta's death, but Natha and Yamuna adopt her to get Anna's property.
- Namrata Pawaskar as Chhaya Hari Naik, Anna's third child and only daughter, whose husband died on the night of their wedding, leaving her widowed in her parents' home. Madhav and Abhiram's sister. Datta and Pandu's adoptive sister. Sushma's stepsister.
- Dilip Bapat as Advocate Nene, who always saved Anna after he committed any crime and helped him acquire properties, while secretly filching portions of it. After Anna's death, Nene Vakil oversees the property distribution between Anna's heirs.
- Anil Gawade as Raghunath "Raghu" Gurav, who is the Gurav of the village, often called by the Naiks whenever any paranormal event occurs. He also eyes Anna's property. He always practices Black Magic in the name of holy commotion.
- Pralhad Kudtarkar as Pandu, a man cared for by the Naiks who forgets almost everything he hears or sees ever since he witnessed his father's death by Anna. Anna's adoptive son. He knows many secrets of the Naik family from the past and the present. He is not taken seriously by anyone because he always forgets everything.
- Prajakta Wadaye as Police Constable who arrests Neelima in the series finale.
- Hemant Joshi as Jatin Sheth, an unscrupulous businessman who wants to grow his empire in the village with Neelima.
- Pooja Gore as Purva Dattaram Naik, Sarita and Datta's younger child.
- Nupur Chitale as Devika Abhiram Naik, Abhiram's wife.
- Abhishek Gaonkar as Ganesh Dattaram Naik, Sarita and Datta's elder child.
- Nachiket Devasthali as Vishwasrao, Police Inspector and Abhiram's close college friend.
- Adish Vaidya as Archis Madhav Naik, Neelima and Madhav's son.

== Production ==
In late 2018, Zee Marathi and the production house confirmed the production of Ratris Khel Chale 2.

The production and filming of series took place in Akeri, Maharashtra in the Konkan Region. The first season of this serial was supposed to be based on horror, but was later shifted to thriller crime as people from the Konkan region accused the promotion of series to negatively affect the region's reputation and even a court case was filed.

=== Controversy ===
The Konkan team had objected to the series saying that the series was promoting superstition and wrongfully depicting Konkan as a scary place.

== Adaptations ==
Language	Title	Original release	Network(s)	Last aired	Notes
Marathi	Ratris Khel Chale रात्रीस खेळ चाले	22 February 2016	Zee Marathi	22 October 2016	Original
Kannada	Niguda Ratri ನಿಗೂಢರಾತ್ರಿ	17 July 2017	Zee Kannada	11 May 2018	Remake
Hindi	Raat Ka Khel Saara रात का खेल सारा	29 February 2020	And TV	6 December 2020	Dubbed

== Reception ==
The series premiered from 22 February 2016 by replacing Dil Dosti Duniyadari.

=== Ratings ===
Week	Year	BARC Viewership		Ref.
Week	Year	TRP	Rank	Ref.
Week 29	2016	1.7	5	
Week 31	2016	1.8	5	

== Awards ==
Zee Marathi Utsav Natyancha Awards 2016
Category	Recipient	Role	Ref.
Best Character Male	Pralhad Kudtarkar	Pandu	
