= Apurva Nemlekar =

Indian television actress

- Born: 27 December 1988 (age 37); Mumbai, Maharashtra, India
- Occupation: Actress
- Years active: 2011–present
- Known for: Aabhas Ha; Ratris Khel Chale 2; Ratris Khel Chale 3; Bigg Boss Marathi 4; Premachi Gosht
- Spouse: Rohan Deshpande (m. 2014; div. 2016) Tanuj Govalkar (m. 2026)

Apurva Nemlekar (born 27 December 1988) is an Indian actress who works predominantly in Marathi television. She made her television debut with Aabhas Ha serial on Zee Marathi. She is known for her performance in Ratris Khel Chale 2 as Shevanta. She has participated in Bigg Boss Marathi 4 as a contestant where she emerged as 1st Runner-up.

== Early life ==
Apurva Nemlekar was born on 27 December 1988 and brought up in Mumbai, Maharashtra. She completed her BMS Degree from D. G. Ruparel College of Arts, Science and Commerce. After completing her studies, she started a job at an event management company.

== Career ==
In 2011, She made her debut with Aabhas Ha Marathi series as Aarya. In 2014, She made her film debut with Bhakarkhadi 7 km. She acted in movies like Ishq Wala Love, The Accidental Prime Minister and Mixer. She also played a lead role in Aradhana. In 2015, She did a supporting role in Tu Jivala Guntavave as Soumya.

In 2019, She acted in Ratris Khel Chale 2 as Shevanta. She was played a role of Pummmy in Tuza Maza Jamtay from November 2020 to February 2021. From March 2021 to October 2021, she reprised her role as Shevanta in Ratris Khel Chale 3 before quitting the series due to dispute with producers and the channel. Since 2022, she is playing the role of Chinnamma in Sony Marathi's historical show Swarajya Saudamini Tararani and also paid a guest visit in Maharashtrachi Hasyajatra. Since October 2022, she participated in Colors Marathi's reality show Bigg Boss Marathi 4.

== Filmography ==
=== Films ===
Year	Title	Role	Notes
2014	Bhakarkhadi 7 km	Cameo appearance	Debut
2014	Ishq Wala Love	Cameo appearance	
2019	The Accidental Prime Minister	Reporter	Cameo
2020	Sab Kushal Mangal	Shyama	Supporting role
2023	Ravrambha	Shahin Aapa	Supporting role

=== Television ===
Year	Title	Role	Notes
2011–2012	Aabhas Ha	Aarya	
2013	Aaradhana	Pooja Mahajan	
2013	Eka Peksha Ek Jodicha Mamla	Contestant	
2015	Tu Jivala Guntavave	Soumya Budhwadkar	
2017	Prem He	Tanvi	Episodic Role
2017–2018	Tu Majha Saangaati	Soyra	
2019–2020	Ratris Khel Chale 2	Kumudini "Shevanta" Patankar	
2020–2021	Tuza Maza Jamtay	Pummmy	
2021	Ratris Khel Chale 3	Kumudini "Shevanta" Patankar	
2022	Swarajya Saudamini Tararani	Rani Chenamma	
2022	Maharashtrachi Hasyajatra	Guest Actress	
2022–2023	Bigg Boss Marathi 4	Contestant (1st Runner up)	
2023–2025	Premachi Gosht	Savani Bhoir	
2025–2026	Shubhvivah	Apurva Purohit	

== Theatre ==
Year	Title	Role	Ref.
2016	Aalay Motha Shahana	Cinderella	
2017	Choricha Mamla		
2019	Iblis	Shevanta	
