= Prasad Jawade =

Indian actor

- Born: 30 November 1988 (age 37); Kalyan, Maharashtra
- Occupation: Actor
- Years active: 2009 –present
- Known for: Ase He Kanyadan; Bigg Boss Marathi 4
- Spouse: Amruta Deshmukh (m. 2023)

Prasad Jawade is an Indian actor who mainly works in Marathi film and television. Currently, he participated in Colors Marathi's reality show Bigg Boss Marathi 4 as a contestant.

== Personal life ==
Jawade has been in a relationship with Amruta Deshmukh, a fellow contestant of Bigg Boss Marathi. They got married on 18 November 2023.

== Career ==
Jawade was born in Kalyan, Maharashtra. Before starting a career, he joined a theatre group in Pune. In 2010, he appeared in Zee Marathi's Maziya Priyala Preet Kalena. In 2011, he got first lead role in Zee Marathi's Arundhati. In 2013, he again bagged the lead role in Star Pravah's Laxmi v/s Saraswati.

In 2015, he appeared in Ase He Kanyadan. In 2019, he came into limelight after he played a role of B.R. Ambedkar in Ek Mahanayak – Dr. B.R. Ambedkar. Since October 2022, he participated in Bigg Boss Marathi 4.

== Filmography ==
=== Films ===
Year	Title	Role	Language	Ref.
2016	Guru	Cameo appearance	Marathi	
2016	Mr. and Mrs. Sadachari	Dattu	Marathi	
2019	Chhichhore	Father in the train	Hindi	
2020	Malang	Deven Jadhav	Hindi	
2022	Ek Villain Returns	Ashu Bhoir	Hindi	

=== Television ===
Year	Title	Role	Channel	Ref.
2009-2010	Maharashtracha Superstar	Contestant	Zee Marathi	
2010-2011	Maziya Priyala Preet Kalena	Jay Prabhu	Zee Marathi	
2011-2012	Arundhati	Digvijay	Zee Marathi	
2012-2013	Laxmi v/s Saraswati	Raghuram Nakhwa	Star Pravah	
2015	Ase He Kanyadan	Kartik	Zee Marathi	
2016-2017	Kulswamini	Abhay	Star Pravah	
2017	Awaaz – Punyashlok Ahilyabai Holkar	Cameo appearance	Colors Marathi	
2019-2021	Ek Mahanayak – Dr. B. R. Ambedkar	B. R. Ambedkar	And TV	
2022-2023	Bigg Boss Marathi 4	Contestant	Colors Marathi	
2023	Kavyanjali – Sakhi Savali	Pritam Gupte	Colors Marathi	
2024-2026	Paaru	Aditya Kirloskar	Zee Marathi	
2026-present	Deep Jyoti	Deep Gaikwad	Zee Marathi	
