= Neha Joshi =

Indian film and television actress

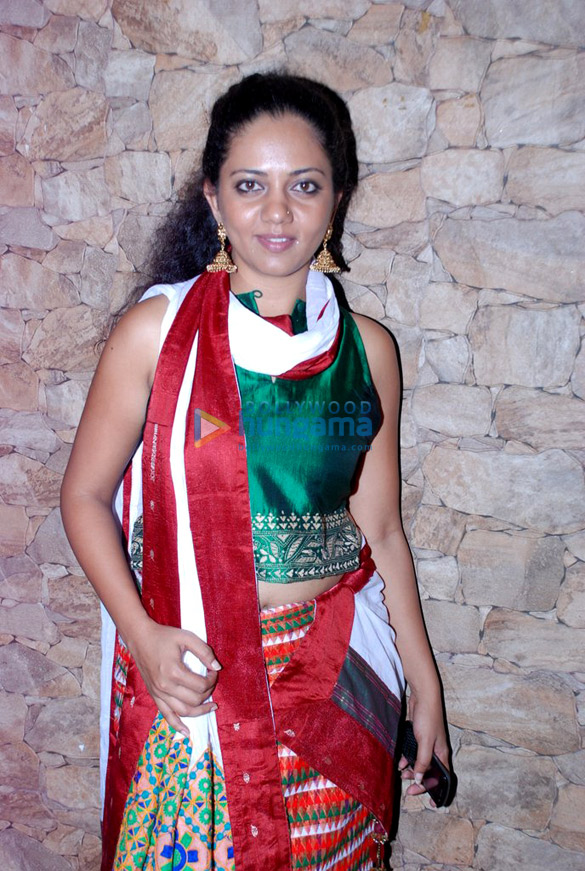
- Born: Pune, Maharashtra, India
- Occupations: Actress; film producer
- Years active: 2000–present
- Spouse: Omkar Kulkarni (m. 2022)

Neha Joshi is an Indian actress who works in Hindi and Marathi films and television. Her works include Zenda (2010), Hawaa Hawaai (2014) and Poshter Boyz (2014). Joshi played B. R. Ambedkar's mother Bhima in the serial Ek Mahanayak – Dr. B. R. Ambedkar on &TV.

== Personal life ==
During her college days, she actively participated in inter-collegiate drama competitions. She started her acting career from the commercial Marathi Stage Drama Kshan Ek Pure and Television career from the Marathi serial Oon Paus in 2000.

She married writer Omakar Kulkarni on 16 August 2022

== Career ==
She has acted in various Marathi films, commercial dramas and Marathi television serials. She also acted in a few Hindi films. Her role in the Marathi film Poshter Boyz, directed by Sameer Patil received critical appreciation. In 2016, she also produced the Marathi short film Ukali.

== Filmography ==
=== Films ===
Year	Title	Role	Language
2009	Zenda	Pooja	Marathi
2009	Sundar Majha Ghar		Marathi
2012	Swapna Tujhe Ni Majhe		Marathi
2013	Jab Love Hua		Hindi
2013	Prem Mhanje Prem Mhanje Prem Asta		Marathi
2013	Bach Ke Zaraa Bhoot Bangle Mein		Hindi
2014	Nati	Manjula	Marathi
2014	Hawaa Hawaai	Taramati	Hindi
2014	Poshter Boyz	Sadanand's wife	Marathi
2014	Saturday Sunday		Marathi
2015	Dream Mall	Sai	Marathi
2015	Sachai Ni Jeet		Gujarati
2016	Poshter Girl	Priyanka	Marathi
2016	Lalbaugchi Rani	Sweety	Marathi
2017	Baghtos Kay Mujra Kar	Nanasaheb's wife	Marathi
2017	Ukli	Anuradha	Marathi
2018	One Night Out		Hindi
2018	Nude	Maanik	Marathi
2018	Aaron	Kaku	Marathi
2018	Farzand	Kamali	Marathi
2019	Nashibvaan	Reshma	Marathi
2020	Aathshe Khidkya Navshe Daar	Jai	Marathi
2020	Medium Spicy	Nissim's sister	Marathi
2022	Drishyam 2	Jenny Thomas	Hindi
2024	Sapala		Marathi
2026	Drishyam: The Conclusion	Jenny Thomas	Hindi

=== Television ===
Year	Title	Role	Language	Ref.
2005	Oon Paaus		Marathi	
2009–2010	Avaghachi Sansar	Sanyogeeta Bhonsle	Marathi	
2014–2016	Ka Re Durava	Rajani Deshmukh	Marathi	
2017	Jyotiba Aani Savitribai Phule	Savitribai Phule	Marathi	
2019–2020	Ek Mahanayak – Dr. B. R. Ambedkar	Bhima Sakpal Ambedkar	Hindi	
2022–2023	Doosri Maa	Yashoda	Hindi	
2023–present	Atal	Krishna Vajpayee	Hindi	
