= Ek Mahanayak – Dr. B. R. Ambedkar =

Indian television series

- Genre: Drama
- Written by: Shanti Bhushan
- Directed by: Vinod Manikrao
- Starring: Atharva Karve
- Country of origin: India
- Original language: Hindi
- No. of episodes: 1135

Production
- Production location: Mumbai
- Running time: 20-22 minutes approx.
- Production company: Sobo Films

Original release
- Release: 17 December 2019 – 5 August 2024

Ek Mahanayak – Dr. B.R. Ambedkar (Translation: A Great Hero – Dr. B.R. Ambedkar) is an Indian Hindi-language drama series produced by Sobo Films. It premiered on 17 December 2019 on And TV with Ayudh Bhanushali as the five-year old Bhimrao. In 2021, the story moved on for several years and Atharva Karve was introduced as young B. R. Ambedkar.

== Cast ==
=== Main ===
- Aayudh Bhanushali as five-year old Ambedkar / Bhimrao / Bheem
- Atharva Karve as adult/young Bhimrao Ambedkar
- Prasad Jawade as Bhimrao Ramji Ambedkar

=== Recurring ===
- Jagannath Nivangune as Ramji Maloji Sakpal: Bhimrao's father
- Narayani Mahesh Varne as Ramabai Bhimrao Ambedkar
- Emir Shah as Vaibhav Dev
- Neha Joshi as Bhimabai Sakpal: Bhimrao's mother
- Vikram Dwivedi as Narottam Joshi: Bhimrao's rival
- Suresh Panwar as Janardan
- Saud Mansuri as Raju Rao: Bhimrao's brother
- Athar Khan as Aanand Rao: Bhimrao's brother
- Vanshika Yadav as Manjula: Bhimrao's sister
- Sapna Devalkar as Ganga: Bhimrao's sister
- Atul Patil as Shishupal
- Falguni Dave as Mira: Bhimrao's paternal aunt
- Ratnakar Nadkarni as Sarwagya Maharaj in Hindi, Barbari Garu in Kannada, Swami Maharaj in Tamil: Lead Atagonist
- Amit Pandey as Purushottam
- Naman Arora as Mahesh ( Bheem's Jija ji & Manjula's husband)
- Parma Gutte as a villager
- Ashif Syed as a villager
- Tarlok Singh
- Krishna Kant Singh Bundela as Tantrik
- Chakramani Mishra as Jokhu

== Production ==
The show was produced By Sobo Films - Mumbai which is founded by Smruti Sushilkumar Shinde.

=== Casting ===
In July 2021, it was announced that show will take a leap. Atharva Karve and Narayani Mahesh Varne were introduced as Dr. B.R. Ambedkar and Ramabai Bhimrao Ambedkar respectively.
