= Atal (TV series) =

Indian television series

- Genre: Drama
- Written by: Shanti Bhushan
- Country of origin: India
- Original language: Hindi
- No. of episodes: 254

Production
- Producer: Aarrav Jindal
- Running time: 20-22 minutes approx.
- Production company: Euphoria Productions

Original release
- Network: &TV
- Release: 5 December 2023 – 15 January 2025

Atal is an Indian Hindi-language television drama series that aired from 5 December 2023 on &TV. It is produced by Aarrav Jindal under Euphoria Productions, it stars Vyom Thakkar as the seven year old Atal Bihari Vajpayee.

== Cast ==
- Vyom Thakkar as Young Atal Bihari Vajpayee
- Neha Joshi as Krishna Devi Vajpayee
- Ashutosh Kulkarni as Krishna Bihari Vajpayee
- Milind Dastane as Shyam Lal Vajpayee
- Rahul Jethva as Awadh Bihari Vajpayee
- Arya Joshi as Awadh’s wife
- Shubham Chaudhary as Sada Bihari Vajpayee
- Saksham Shringirishi as Prem Bihari Vajpayee
- Alina as Urmila Bihari Vajpayee
- Aline as Kamla Bihari Vajpayee
- Thakur Krishna Raj as Dayal
- Vipin Pachori as Muslim Teacher
- Abhinav Parashar as English Teacher

== Production ==
The series was announced by Euphoria Productions on And TV. The cast included Vyom Thakkar, Neha Joshi and Ashutosh Kulkarni.
