= Bhakarkhadi 7 km =

Bhakarkhadi7km
- Directed by: Umesh Namjoshi
- Story by: Dinesh Vaidya
- Produced by: Dinesh Vaidya
- Starring: Aniket Vishwasrao; Veena Jamakar; Apurva Nemalekar
- Edited by: Jayant Jathar
- Music by: Kamlesh Bandkamkar
- Release date: 9 May 2014
- Running time: 116 minutes
- Country: India
- Language: Marathi

Bhakarkhadi7km is a 2014 Indian Marathi-language film directed by Umesh Namjoshi. It is written and produced by Dinesh Vaidya. It was released on 9 May 2014.

== Plot ==
Bhakharkhadi 7 km tells the story of a young doctor who aspires to a career as a surgeon in America. His dreams are shattered by his involvement in one emergency surgery and the dirty politics surrounding the case. As a scapegoat, he is sent to a remote Marathi village to work in their primary health center. The film highlights rural Marathi culture and lifestyle alongside contemporary Indian urban life and youth.

== Reception ==
Marathi Movie World describes the film as carrying a strong social message, while remaining entertaining and breathtaking.

== Production ==
=== Cast ===
Adult cast

- Aniket Vishwasrao
- Renuka Shahane
- Veena Jamkar
- Anant Jog
- Uday Tikekar
- Girish Oak
- Anand Abhyankar
- Bharat Ganeshpure
- Ashok Samel
- Suyash Tilak
- Apurva Nemlekar
- Vikas Pandurang Patil
- Vijay Nikam
- Kiranraj Pote

Children

- Shroyaman Rana
- Machindra Gadkar
- Samiksha Majarekar

=== Crew ===
- Producers: Dinesh Vaidya and Priyanka Prashant Kamat
- Story: Dinesh Vaidya
- Screenplay: Nandu Pardeshi
- Art Director: Hemant kakirde
- Cinematography: Prasad Bhende
- Editor: Jayant Jathar
- Music: Kamlesh Bandkamkar
- Lyrics: Dinesh Vaidya

Aniket Vishwasrao was selected to play the male lead whereas Veena Jamkar was cast opposite him. Veteran Theatre and Bollywood actress Renuka Shahane was said to play a pivotal role in this Movie. Anant Jog was cast as the Antagonist of the Movie
