= Madhuri (2018 film) =

- Directed by: Swapna Waghmare Joshi
- Screenplay by: Shiris Latkar, Sameer Arora
- Story by: Shiris Latkar, Sameer Arora, Swapna Waghmare Joshi
- Produced by: Mohsin Akhtar & Nirali Manek
- Starring: Sonali Kulkarni; Sharad Kelkar; Sanhita Joshi; Akshay Kelkar; Virajas Kulkarni
- Cinematography: Prasad Bhende
- Edited by: Kshitija Khandagale
- Production company: Mumbapuri Productions
- Distributed by: AA Films
- Release date: 30 November 2018
- Country: India
- Language: Marathi

Madhuri is an Indian Marathi language film, presented by Urmila Matondkar in association with Shekhar Mate directed by Swapna Waghmare Joshi and produced by Mohsin Akhtar under the banner of Mumbapuri Films. The film is scheduled to be released on 30 November 2018. A theatrical poster was released on 19 October 2018.

== Cast ==
- Sonali Kulkarni
- Sharad Kelkar
- Sanhita Joshi
- Akshay Kelkar
- Virajas Kulkarni

== Plot ==
In a beautiful sleepy town of Panchgani lives a strict, principled professor with her equally rebellious and difficult daughter.

In a quirky twist of fate, the professor meets with an accident and her memory travels back to the age of twenty. What follows is the total role reversal for the daughter, who does not know how to handle the situation. The only saving grace here is the psychiatrist who is treating her mother.

On coming abreast with a completely different side of the mother's personality, she sets on a journey to find out about her mother's past. Will she be able to mend the troubled relationship she had with her mother? Will the psychiatrist be able to revive back the professor's memory?

== Music ==
No.	Title	Lyrics	Music	Singer(s)	Length
1.	"K Sera"	Vaibhav Joshi	Avadhoot Gupte	Jaanvee Arrora, Swapnil Bandodkar, Mugdha Karhade	5:34
2.	"Junya Photo (Male)"	Vaibhav Joshi	Avadhoot Gupte	Swapnil Bandodkar	4:23
3.	"Junya Photo (Female)"	Vaibhav Joshi	Avadhoot Gupte	Vaishali Samant	4:23
4.	"Sorry Mhanaychay (Male)"	Vaibhav Joshi	Avadhoot Gupte	Avadhoot Gupte	4:51
5.	"Sorry Mhanaychay (Female)"	Vaibhav Joshi	Avadhoot Gupte	Mugdha Karhade	4:51
Total length:					25:09
