= Akshay Kelkar =

Indian actor

- Born: 16 March 1993 (age 32); Thane, Maharashtra, India
- Occupation: Actor
- Years active: 2014–present
- Known for: Nima Denzongpa, Bigg Boss Marathi season 4; Abeer Gulal
- Spouse: Sadhana Kakatkar (m. 2023)

Akshay Kelkar is an Indian actor who primarily works in Marathi and Hindi television and films. In October 2022, he participated and won the title of Colors Marathi's Bigg Boss Marathi season 4.

== Early life ==
Kelkar was born in Thane, Maharashtra. His father name is Jayendra Kelkar, an autorickshaw driver. He completed his commercial art through LS Raheja School of Art, Worli.

== Career ==
He started his acting career via roles in Crime Patrol on Sony TV and got his big break on Star Pravah's Be Dune Daha as Kabir in 2013. After that he did one Marathi film as cameo. He the starred in Bhakharwadi as Abhishek Gokhale and in Nima Denzongpa as Suresh Mane. He also appeared in a cameo role in Wagle Ki Duniya. He participated in Colors Marathi's reality show Bigg Boss Marathi season 4 as a contestant and ended up as the winner.

== Personal life ==
Akshay is married to his long time girlfriend Sadhana.

== Filmography ==
=== Films ===
- All films are in Marathi unless otherwise noted.

Year	Title	Role	Notes
2014	Premasathi	Cameo	Debut film
2016	Kanha		
2018	Madhuri	Google	
2020	Don Cutting	Kunal	Short film
2020	Exit	Hindi Short film	
2021	Don Cutting 2	Kunal	Web film
2022	Takatak 2	Thokya	
2022	Neel Mrugsee	Neel	Web film
2022	Epilogue		Web film
2023	Don Cutting 3	Kunal	Web film

=== Television ===
Year	Title	Role	Language	Channel	Ref.
2014	Be Dune Daha	Kabir	Marathi	Star Pravah	
2014–2016	Kamala	Uday Deshpande	Marathi	Colors Marathi	
2015–2016	Yek Number	Veda's brother	Marathi	Star Pravah	
2018	Aamhi Doghi	Mihir Rajadhyaksh	Marathi	Zee Yuva	
2019–2020	Bhakharwadi	Abhishek Gokhale	Hindi	Sony SAB	
2021	Wagle Ki Duniya	Abhishek Gokhale	Hindi	Sony SAB	
2021–2022	Nima Denzongpa	Suresh Mane	Hindi	Colors TV	
2022–2023	Bigg Boss Marathi season 4	Winner	Marathi	Colors Marathi	
2023	Dholkichya Talavar season 6	Host	Marathi	Colors Marathi	
2024	Abeer Gulal	Agastya Nimbalkar	Marathi	Colors Marathi	
2025	Kajalmaya	Aarush Walawalkar	Marathi	Star Pravah	

=== Web series ===
Year	Title	Role	Channel	Ref.
2018	Full Tight		Sony LIV	
2018	Bang Bang		YouTube	Philambazz film company
2021	After Xeffect		YouTube	Philambazz film company
