= Ruchira Jadhav =

Indian actress

- Born: 13 July 1998 (age 28); Mumbai, Maharashtra, India
- Occupation: Actress
- Years active: 2015 - present
- Known for: Majhya Navaryachi Bayko

Ruchira Jadhav is an Indian television and film actress who mainly works in Marathi industry. She made her film debut with Sobat (2018) and Television debut with Tuzya Vachun Karmena (2016). Currently, she has participated in Colors Marathi's Bigg Boss Marathi 4.

== Early life ==
Ruchira was born in Mumbai, Maharashtra. She did her schooling from Parag Vidyalaya, Bhandup. She completed her graduation degree from K. J. Somaiya College, Mumbai. She was very active in her college cultural programs.

== Personal life ==
She is in relationship with her fellow contestant of Bigg Boss Marathi 4 Rohit Shinde since 2022.

== Filmography ==
=== Films ===
Year	Title	Role	Ref.
2018	Sobat		
2018	Love Lafde	Ruchi	
2022	Haemolymph: Invisible Blood	Sajida Shaikh	
2022	Luckdown Be Positive	Naina	
2022	Epilogue	Preet	
2024	Babu		
2025	Reelstar		

=== Television ===
Year	Title	Role	Channel	Ref.
2015	Be Dune Daha	Small cameo	Star Pravah	
2016	Tuzya Vachun Karmena	Nupur Soman	Colors Marathi	
2016	Majhe Pati Saubhagyawati	Crew member	Zee Marathi	
2017	Prem He	Mukta Jahagirdar	Zee Yuva	
2020-2021	Majhya Navaryachi Bayko	Maya	Zee Marathi	
2022	Bigg Boss Marathi 4	Contestant	Colors Marathi	
2023	36 Guni Jodi	Sahitya	Zee Marathi	
2024	Tu Hi Re Majha Mitwa	Lavanya	Star Pravah	

== Marathi Play Career ==
Her latest Marathi Play is Tu Tu Me Me directed by Kedar Shinde.
