= Poshter Boyz =

- Theatrical release poster
- Directed by: Sameer Patil
- Written by: Charudatta Bhagwat
- Screenplay by: Sameer Patil; Charudatta Bhagwat
- Story by: Sameer Patil
- Produced by: Deepti Talpade; Shreyas Talpade
- Starring: Dilip Prabhavalkar; Hrishikesh Joshi; Aniket Vishwasrao; Pooja Sawant; Neha Joshi
- Cinematography: Pushpank Gawde
- Edited by: Abhijit Kokate
- Music by: Milind Joshi
- Production company: Affluence Movies Private Limited
- Distributed by: Affluence Movies Private Limited
- Release date: 1 August 2014
- Running time: 180 minutes
- Country: India
- Language: Marathi
- Budget: ₹2 crore (US$240,000)
- Box office: ₹8.5 crore (US$1.0 million)

Poshter Boyz is a 2014 Indian Marathi-language comedy film directed by Sameer Patil and written by Sameer Patil and Charudatta Bhagwat. The movie stars Dilip Prabhavalkar, Hrishikesh Joshi, Aniket Vishvasrao in lead roles and Pooja Sawant, Neha Joshi in female lead cast. The film was produced by Shreyas Talpade. This is the second movie produced by Shreyas Talpade under his home production Affluence Movies Private Limited after Sanai Choughade. The film is released in theatres on 1 August 2014. The film was remade in Hindi as Poster Boys starring Sunny Deol, Bobby Deol and Shreyas Talpade.

== Cast ==
- Dilip Prabhavalkar as Jagan Deshmukh (Appa)
- Hrishikesh Joshi as Sadanand Kulkarni (Master)
- Aniket Vishwasrao as Arjun
- Pooja Sawant as Kalpana
- Neha Joshi as wife of Sadanand Kulkarni
- Shreyas Talpade as Chief Minister
- Bharat Ganeshpure as District Health Officer
- Murali Sharma as Health Minister of Maharashtra
- Ashwini Kalsekar as Head of Health Department

== Soundtrack ==
Poshter Boyz

Soundtrack album by Lesle Lewis
- Released: July 2014
- Genre: Film soundtrack
- Label: Video Palace

Lesle Lewis chronology
Colonial Cousins Once More (2012)	Poshter Boyz (2014)

The film's soundtrack was composed by Lesle Lewis. Lyrics were penned by Shreyas Talpade, Chaitnya Sant & Ambrish Deshpande.

=== Track list ===
No.	Title	Singer(s)	Length
1	"Aale Re Poshter Boyz"	Avadhoot Gupte, Bela Shende	13:00
2	"Deva Deva Kamal Bhari"	Nandesh Umap, Swapnil Bandodkar, Bela Shende	3:31
3	"Kshan Hey"	Shankar Mahadevan	7:44

== Release ==
The movie was a surprise hit at the box office grossing ₹1 crore (US$120,000) in first 3-days. The positive word of mouth helped movie to gross ₹8.5 crore (US$1.0 million) in its full run making it a blockbuster.
