= Ratris Khel Chale 3 =

2021 Indian Marathi language TV Series

- The poster of Season 3 of the serial
- Genre: Supernatural
- Written by: Pralhad Kudtarkar
- Story by: Rajendra Ghag
- Directed by: Raju Sawant
- Starring: See below
- Theme music composer: Pankaj Padghan
- Country of origin: India
- Original language: Marathi
- No. of seasons: 3
- No. of episodes: 238

Production
- Producer: Sunil Bhosale
- Camera setup: Multi-camera
- Running time: 22 minutes
- Production company: Someel Creations

Original release
- Network: Zee Marathi
- Release: 22 March 2021 – 9 April 2022

Related
- Ratris Khel Chale; Ratris Khel Chale 2

Ratris Khel Chale 3 (transl. The Game Runs At Night 3) is an Indian Marathi language supernatural television series which aired on Zee Marathi. It premiered from 22 March 2021 and is a sequel to Ratris Khel Chale.

== Series ==
Season	Episodes	Originally Broadcast	
Season	Episodes	First aired	Last aired
1	210	22 February 2016	22 October 2016
2	413	14 January 2019	27 March 2020
2	413	20 July 2020	29 August 2020
3	238	22 March 2021	30 April 2021
3	238	16 August 2021	9 April 2022

== Plot ==
15 years after Neelima's evil acts to usurp the Naik property, Indumati (wife of Anna Naik) has grown old and works as a maid at agent Salgaonkar's house, and Dattaram works as a servant to the farmer. Madhav was traumatized due to his wife, Neelima's acts and Archis' suicide and becomes mentally unstable and troubled by the villagers. Abhiram has settled in Bangalore with his second wife, Kaveri, after divorcing Devika. Sushma, who is daughter of Shevanta and step-daughter of Indumati and Anna, is rich and wants to sell the Naik Wada, which is in bad condition and is possessed by Anna, Shevanta and all the people killed by Anna.

Sushma wants to sell off the Naik Wada with the help of agent Salgaonkar, Chhaya, and Sarita. Indumati learns of this and calls Abhiram along with Kaveri. After seeing the adversities of the wada, he renovates it. Shevanta possess Kaveri and Anna while in an attempt to possess Abhiram, possesses Sayaji. The possessed couple starts their affair once again and start causing trouble in the Naik wada. After renovation of the Wada, Sushma along with Sayaji, Sarita, Dattaram and Chhaya who is married off to Raghu Kaka who is now turned into Raghunath Maharaj. After learning all of this, Kaveri, possessed by Shevanta, starts troubling everyone with the desire of living alone with Sayaji, who is possessed by Anna.

Soon the spirits starts to meet each other creating misunderstandings against Sayaji and Kaveri. Everyone except Indumati decide to sell off Naik Wada but they are stopped by the spirits. Abhiram learns of Purva who is married off to a mentally disabled man and is ill-treated by her in-laws. He gets her back to the Wada while her in-laws are killed by the spirits. Because the spirits possessing Kaveri and Sayaji, they are ill-treated by the Naiks while the spirits too torture them. Indumati learns of all the possession and asks Raghu to free the spirits but is killed by the spirits.

Indumati reveals the truth of the spirits possessing Kaveri and Sayaji to everyone. Indumati then contacts a sorceress who is revealed to be Vatsala. Vatsala, or Vachhi, who is changed for the good, gains Indumati's trust and enters the Wada to free the spirits. She makes a deal with the spirits to get them married and the spirits should leave the Wada. She also asks the spirits the heal Madhav as the first part of the deal. When the spirits try to trick Vacchi, she traps them and stops their powers along with Madhav, who has become her disciple. Vengeful, the spirits decide to kill all the Naiks.

After all the ruckus, the spirits try to torture the entire family. Sayaji and Kaveri also learn of their possession and are haunted by all the spirits. During this, Purva is married off to her friend. Vacchi, Madhav and Indumati try to tackle the spirits while Abhiram and Sushma try to tame Kaveri and Sayaiji with the help of others. When the things escalate to great extent, the dead villagers' spirits trouble Anna and Shevanta and ask for a human sacrifice, "Bali". Vacchi sacrifices her life against another deal with the spirits to leave the Naiks and wada alone but gets deceived again and loses her life.

After Vacchi's death the spirits again possess Kaveri and Sayaji and try to kill the Naiks but they are stopped and Mai binds them with the promise of the ultimate god to which the spirits agree. She fulfills the final desires but is deceived by the spirits and they try to kill her. Madhav then comes, saves Indumati and frees Anna's spirits with Vacchi's spirit's guidance who repents for all the unfaithful things he caused to the family. Shevanta was on lose and was on her way to kill Naiks but is repelled by the holy spirit of her husband and hence all the souls get freed. The show ends with Kaveri being pregnant with Abhiram's child then the family live happily ever after in the spirit-free Naik Wada.

== Cast ==
=== Main ===
- Madhav Abhyankar as Hari "Anna" Naik
- Shakuntala Nare as Indumati "Maai" Hari Naik
- Apurva Nemlekar / Krutika Tulaskar as Kumudini "Shevanta" Kamalakar Patankar

=== Recurring ===
- Sainkeet Kamat as Abhiram Hari Naik
- Bhagya Nair as Kaveri Abhiram Naik
- Pooja Gore as Purva Dattaram Naik
- Mangesh Salvi as Madhav Hari Naik
- Pralhad Kudtarkar as Pandu
- Suhas Shirsat as Dattaram Hari Naik (Datta)
- Prajakta Wadaye as Sarita Dattaram Naik
- Purniema Dey-Demanna as Sushma Hari Naik (Sushlya)
- Mahesh Phalke as Inspector Sayaji, Sushma's husband
- Anil Gawade as Raghunath Maharaj / Raghunath Gurav (Raghu)
- Namrata Pawaskar as Chhaya Maa / Chhaya Hari Naik
- Suraj Patki as Purva's husband
- Sanjeevani Patil as Vatsala Aaba Naik (Vachchhi)
- Ganesh Jadhav as Vinay

== Production ==
=== Development ===
On 14 February 2021, Zee Marathi and the production house confirmed the production of Ratris Khel Chale 3.

=== Casting ===
Madhav Abhyankar returned as Anna Naik. Apurva Nemlekar returned as Shevanta. Shakuntala Nare, Mangesh Salvi, Sainkeet Kamat, Anil Gawde, Suhas Shirsat, Prajakta Wadaye and Namrata Pawaskar reprised their roles as Indumati, Madhav, Abhiram, Raghunath Gurav, Dattaram, Sarita and Chhaya, respectively, while Purniema Dey was offered the role of Sushma Naik who was previously played by Rutuja Dharmadhikari. Bhagya Nair selected for the role of Kaveri who speaks Malayalam. In November 2021, Nemlekar quit the series, calling out bullying by co-actors and a dispute with the channel as the reasons.

=== Location ===
The series was filmed in Konkan. The production and filming again took place in Naik's wada. The production and filming of the series then took place in Akeri, Maharashtra.

=== Filming ===
Filming started in February 2021 in the same Naik Wada in Akeri, Maharashtra. On 13 April, Chief minister of Maharashtra Uddhav Thackeray announced a lockdown due to the rise of COVID-19 cases in Maharashtra, which halted filming. In late July 2021, writer and actor Pralhad Kudtarkar confirmed the return of the series. On 8 August 2021, an official promo was released of Shevanta (Apurva Nemlekar) indicating the show's return on 16 August 2021.

=== Special episode (1 hour) ===
- 26 December 2021

=== Dubbed version ===
Language	Title	Original release	Network(s)	Last aired
Hindi	Raat Ka Khel Saara 3 रात का खेल सारा ३	1 January 2022	And TV	18 September 2022

== Awards ==
Zee Marathi Utsav Natyancha Awards 2021
Category	Recipient	Role
Best Supporting Male	Mahesh Phalke	Sayaji
Best Negative Actor	Madhav Abhyankar	Anna Naik
