= Ratris Khel Chale 2 =

Indian TV series

- The Season 2 poster
- Genre: Horror; Supernatural; Mystery; Thriller; Drama
- Screenplay by: Pralhad Kudtarkar
- Story by: Latika Sawant; Rajendrakumar Ghag
- Directed by: Raju Sawant
- Starring: See below
- Theme music composer: Pankaj Padghan
- Opening theme: "Ratris Khel Chale" by Sayali Pankaj
- Country of origin: India
- Original language: Marathi
- No. of seasons: 3
- No. of episodes: 419

Production
- Producer: Sunil Bhosale
- Editor: Nilesh Gonbare
- Production company: Someel Creations

Original release
- Network: Zee Marathi
- Release: 14 January 2019 – 29 August 2020

Related
- Ratris Khel Chale; Ratris Khel Chale 3

Ratris Khel Chale 2 (transl. The Game Runs At Night 2) is an Indian Marathi language Horror drama series which aired on Zee Marathi. It premiered from 14 January 2019 by replacing Baaji serving as a prequel to the series Ratris Khel Chale.

== Series ==
Season	Episodes	Originally Broadcast	
Season	Episodes	First aired	Last aired
1	210	22 February 2016	22 October 2016
2	413	14 January 2019	27 March 2020
2	413	20 July 2020	29 August 2020
3	238	22 March 2021	30 April 2021
3	238	16 August 2021	9 April 2022

== Plot ==
The second season is the prequel to the first season. It shows the Naik family's mysterious past, which led to Anna Naik's untimely death and the strange occurrences. It revolves around Anna's middle age, when he is an influential person in the village who uses power to take undue advantage of the village folk as well as kill people at times. This all leads to strange events happening in the house, including him witnessing ghosts of the people he murders.

Anna forcefully removes his uncle (father's younger brother), Aaba Naik, his wife Vatsala Naik, and their son Kashi Naik, from their house to control all the family property. He also becomes intimate with Kumudini "Shevanta" Patankar, who newly moves into the village with her husband Kamalakar Patankar. She gives birth to her and Anna's daughter Sushma. Anna also kills many villagers to usurp their properties. Soon, strange events starts to happen in the house, as a result of the ghosts of the people killed by Anna, and Anna witnesses the ghosts sometimes. Years later, after killing Kamalakar, Anna builds a house for Shevanta. But she gets more possessive with Anna. She then tricks him into committing suicide, and she accidentally lives her control over the rope and gets hung up on the tree of the Naik house and the tree gets haunted by her spirit. Finally, over the course of the following few years, Anna mends his ways and gets on the right path of good deeds. But his crime-filled past inflicts curses upon him and he faces untimely death by getting killed by the ghosts of people he murdered throughout his life.

== Cast ==
=== Main ===
- Madhav Abhyankar as Hari "Anna" Naik, the influential person in the village. Shevanta and Indumati's husband.
- Shakuntala Nare as Indumati Naik, Anna's kind-hearted wife.
- Apurva Nemlekar as Kumudini "Shevanta" Kamalakar Patankar, one of the women Anna was obsessed with. She was also Sushma's mother.

=== Recurring ===
- Sanjeevani Patil as Vatsala "Vachchhi" Naik, Aaba's wife and Anna's aunt, who is angry after Anna doesn't share his ancestral wealth with his uncle Aaba, leaving her family in poverty.
- Suhas Shirsat as Dattaram Hari Naik, Anna's second child and son from Bhivari, a poor lady who had intimate relations with Anna. Anna kills Bhivari, and also tries to kill their son, but Indu saves him and names him Dattaram. The most responsible member of the Naik family after Anna.
- Mangesh Salvi as Madhav Hari Naik, Anna's eldest child son who moves to Mumbai for education and work.
- Prajakta Wadaye as Sarita Dattaram Naik, Dattaram's wife and the only second generation mistress in the house to take care of it.
- Namrata Pavaskar as Chhaya Hari Naik, Anna's third child and only daughter, whose husband died on the night of their wedding, leaving her widowed and to live in her parents' home.
- Sainkeet Kamat as Abhiram Hari Naik, Anna's youngest son who is sent to Mumbai for studies at a boarding school.
- Dilip Bapat as Advocate Nene, who always saved Anna after he had committed any crime and helped him acquire properties.
- Anil Gawde as Raghunath Gurav, who is the Gurav of the village and often called by the Naiks whenever any supernatural and paranormal event occurs.
- Pralhad Kudtarkar as Pandu, a man who is mentally ill but still works for the Naik house, sharing no relation with anyone but a strong bond, especially with Indumati.
- Diksha Sonawane as Bhivari, a mistress of Anna and Dattaram's biological mother.
- Abhay Khadapkar as Aaba Naik, Vatsala's husband, Kashi's father, and Anna's uncle (father's younger brother).
- Sachin Shirke as Kashinath Naik, Aaba and Vatsala's only child, and Shobha's husband, who becomes mentally unstable when Anna tries to kill him.
- Mangal Rane as Shobha Kashinath Naik, Aaba and Vatsala's daughter-in-law, and Kashinath's wife, who is almost as cunning as, if not more than, her vengeful mother-in-law. She helps her mother-in-law, Vatsala in doing black magic on Anna and his family.
- Adish Paigude as Kamalakar Patankar, Shevanta's generous and modest husband. His low income disappoints Shevanta and causes her to have extramarital affairs with Anna for money.
- Hridaynath Jadhav as Chongtya, a villager who backbites and gives all the personal reports of Anna to Vatsala and vice versa. He also acts as a messenger between Shevanta and Anna, providing personal messages from Shevanta to Anna when Anna is not able to talk to Shevanta.

== Production ==
=== Development ===
The production and filming of series took place in Akeri, Maharashtra in the Konkan Region. The filming of Season 2 was stopped on 27 March 2020 due to COVID-19 pandemic. But, new episodes of this show were started airing from 13 July 2020. The show went off air in late August and making way for crime series Devmanus.

I believe that, our responsibility doubled after the official announcement of season 2. Also, the storyline of the show is loaded with suspense. All the characters from the season 1 will be seen in the latest season too. Moreover, new characters will be added too. Also, we have chosen same Naikancha Wada for the shoot.

— Pralhad Kudtarkar

=== Casting ===
Madhav Abhyankar was selected to play the role of Anna Naik.

I was informed to reduce my body weight and within a month's of span, I lost 7 to 8 kilograms and it took me more than a month to communicate in Malvani Dialect. I used to watch Malvani plays online.

— Madhav Abhyankar

Apurva Nemlekar was selected to play the role of Shevanta.

I got a call from production house of this series. We are doing a new series will you come to audition? At that time, I am not interested in Sas-bahu series. I was looking for a different kind of role. I auditioned and I acted as like Daily Soap, but I was rejected. Then after a while, I was called back. At that time they said we didn't want to tell, but we were told, we are looking for Shevanta.

— Apurva Nemlekar

Prajakta Wadaye is offered for the role of Sarita who was previously played by Ashwini Mukadam in Ratris Khel Chale.

It was a big surprise for me when I got the call for playing the role of Sarita.

— Prajakta Wadaye

Shakuntala Nare, Suhas Shirsat, Namrata Pawaskar, Pralhad Kudtarkar, Mangesh Salvi reprise their roles of Mai, Datta, Chhaya, Pandu.

== Awards ==
Zee Marathi Utsav Natyancha Awards 2019
Category	Recipient	Role	Ref.
Best Character Female	Apurva Nemlekar	Shevanta	
Best Character Male	Madhav Abhyankar	Anna Naik	
Best Negative Actor	Madhav Abhyankar	Anna Naik	
Best Negative Actress	Sanjeevani Patil	Vachchhi	
Best Supporting Female	Namrata Pawaskar	Chhaya	
Best Supporting Male	Hridaynath Jadhav	Chontya	

== Reception ==
=== Special episode (1 hour) ===
- 31 December 2019

=== Ratings ===
Week	Year	BARC Viewership		Ref.
Week	Year	TRP	Rank	Ref.
Week 8	2020	2.6	5	
Week 10	2020	2.7	5	

=== Dubbed version ===
Language	Title	Original release	Network(s)	Last aired
Marathi	Ratris Khel Chale 2 रात्रीस खेळ चाले २	14 January 2019	Zee Marathi	29 August 2020
Hindi	Raat Ka Khel Saara 2 रात का खेल सारा २	12 December 2020	And TV	26 December 2021
