= Freshers (Indian TV series) =

Indian television series

- Genre: Romance
- Created by: Sanjay Jadhav
- Written by: Sanjay Jadhav; Ashish Pathare
- Directed by: Aniruddh Shinde
- Starring: See below
- Country of origin: India
- Original language: Marathi
- No. of episodes: 211

Production
- Producers: Sanjay Jadhav; Deepak Rane
- Running time: 22 minutes
- Production company: Dreaming 24 Seven Production

Original release
- Network: Zee Yuva
- Release: 22 August 2016 – 13 June 2017

Freshers is an Indian Marathi television series directed by Aniruddh Shinde and it was aired from 22 August 2016 on Zee Yuva. It was ended on 13 June 2017. This series is based on friendship and lifestyle of first year B. M. M. degree college students admitted in H. K. College in Mumbai.

== Plot ==
The story revolves around seven freshmen enrolled in a bachelor's degree in mass media. They all hail from different family backgrounds and also from different parts of Maharashtra. Each one has their own dreams and goals. Initially, critical of their differences, they start enjoying the journey while discovering their true selves. Each day brings about a new set of fun-filled expeditions for them. No matter how bad the situation is they always stand for each other.

== Cast ==
=== Main ===
- Mitali Mayekar as Sayali Bankar: A dynamic and dashing young lady from Nashik. Her father Keshav Bankar, a soldier, was killed in action when she was young. Since moving to Mumbai 2 years before admitting in the college, she works as a saleswoman at a food company. She used to love Nirav but later helped Manava express her love for Nirav.
- Amruta Deshmukh as Pari Deshmukh: A funny character from Latur. Her father Prataprao Deshmukh, a politician, is a member of the Maharashtra Svabhiman Party and head of one of the first families in Latur. She attended H.K. College in Mumbai for her ex-boyfriend Vinit who is also admitted in the same college but is left heartbroken when Vinit deceives her. She is always at loggerheads with Sayali and sometimes with Samrat. She helps her friends during financial issues.
- Onkar Raut as Dhaval Mithbavkar: A lighthearted orphan who lives with his grandmother at Lalbaug, Mumbai. He is a last minute riser. He is always late to lectures and fakes reasons to his professors. He gets into a relation with Ruchira when her ex-boyfriend cheats on her. He is always loggerheads with Mangya and his goon associates and his boss Rohit.
- Siddhart Khirid as Nirav Desai: A smart and kindhearted boy from Pune, belonging to a family of doctors but wishes to be a filmmaker. He is Manava's love interest. He comes up with abstract and innovative ideas for his projects. He faces issues with expenses due to strong opposition of his family to his interest towards his passion. He won special award of Best Director for his contribution in the play staged at Annual Mumbai Inter College Play Competition.
- Rashmi Anpat as Manava Raje: Daughter of Ashok Raje, a millionaire businessman. She is a gorgeous and stunning girl, known for concealing her background and simple behaviour, and a fan of Virat Kohli. She is Nirav's girlfriend. She wrote the play which Nirav directed.
- Rasika Vengurlekar as Renuka Bhillare: A meek and timid girl who hails from Raigad. She is extremely attached to her father, a widower, who runs a sweet shop. She idolizes Sayali as her mother. She is the foodie among the girls. She considers Samrat as her best friend and foodie partner. She aspires to become a News Reporter.
- Shubhankar Tawde as Samrat Patil: A Kabaddi player from Kolhapur. He loves Kabaddi more than anything. He was forcefully sent to college on his mother's and uncle's insistence. He is close with her young sister Shivani "Chabudi". He considers Nirav and Renuka as his best friends and Renuka as his foodie partner. He scores low marks in his exams.

=== Recurring ===
- Vidyadhar Joshi as Principal Harishchandra Kirloskar: Principal of his namesake H. K. College. Though kind on the inside, he is draconian and a stickler for discipline.
- Sunny Mungekar as Rajkumar Deshmukh: Pari's brother and an activist of the Maharashtra Svabhiman Party.
- Sai Kalyankar as Ruchira: Dhaval's girlfriend.
- Ruturaj Shinde as Kiran Chakradev (Chakrya): Nirav and Samrat's estranged and adamant roompartner. He always schemes against the gang and causes troubles for Nirav and Samrat in the hostel room but fails in every attempts.
- Purva Phadke as Juhi Parmar: Vinit's Girlfriend
- Ronak Shinde as Vinit: He is the one who was the boyfriend of Pari but he later confesses Pari that he was actually in love with Juhi.
- Shital Shukla As Dhawal's Grandmother: She is the only one for Dhawal to take care of him. She has close bondings with her grandson. Besides, She runs a general store.
