= Ranade Institute =

Higher Education Institute in Pune

Coordinates: 18.51913177°N 73.84061556°E

Ranade Industrial and Economic Institute, or the Ranade Institute as it is popularly known, is situated at Fergusson College Road, Pune. Built in 1910, the building contains the University of Pune's Department of Communication & Journalism and Department of Foreign Languages.

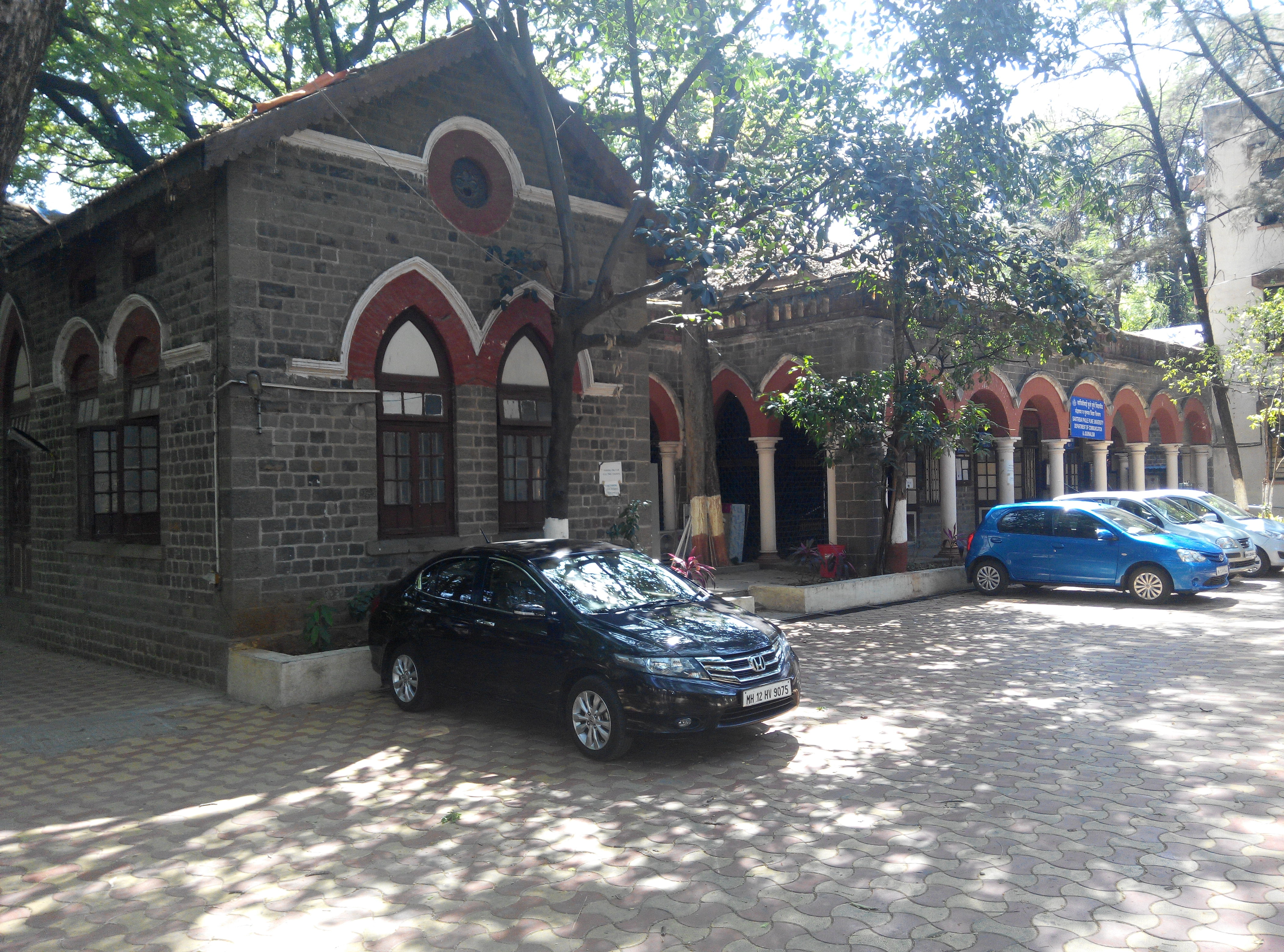
One of the famous institute in Maharashtra imparting courses in journalism and mass communication

== History of the Department of Communication & Journalism ==
An endowment of Rs.10,000/-, made by Shri. K. A. Kolhatkar, led to the creation of the Department of Communication and Journalism by the University of Pune in 1956 and the institution of the "Sandeshkar Kolhatkar Scholarship" for Marathi Journalism. The Department of Communication and Journalism was established in 1964.

== Courses ==
A two-year, part-time diploma course in Journalism was inducted on 5 February 1964. The course was divided into junior and senior year of study, requiring the students to appear for five papers (carrying 100 marks each) at the end of each year. The classes were held in the evening.

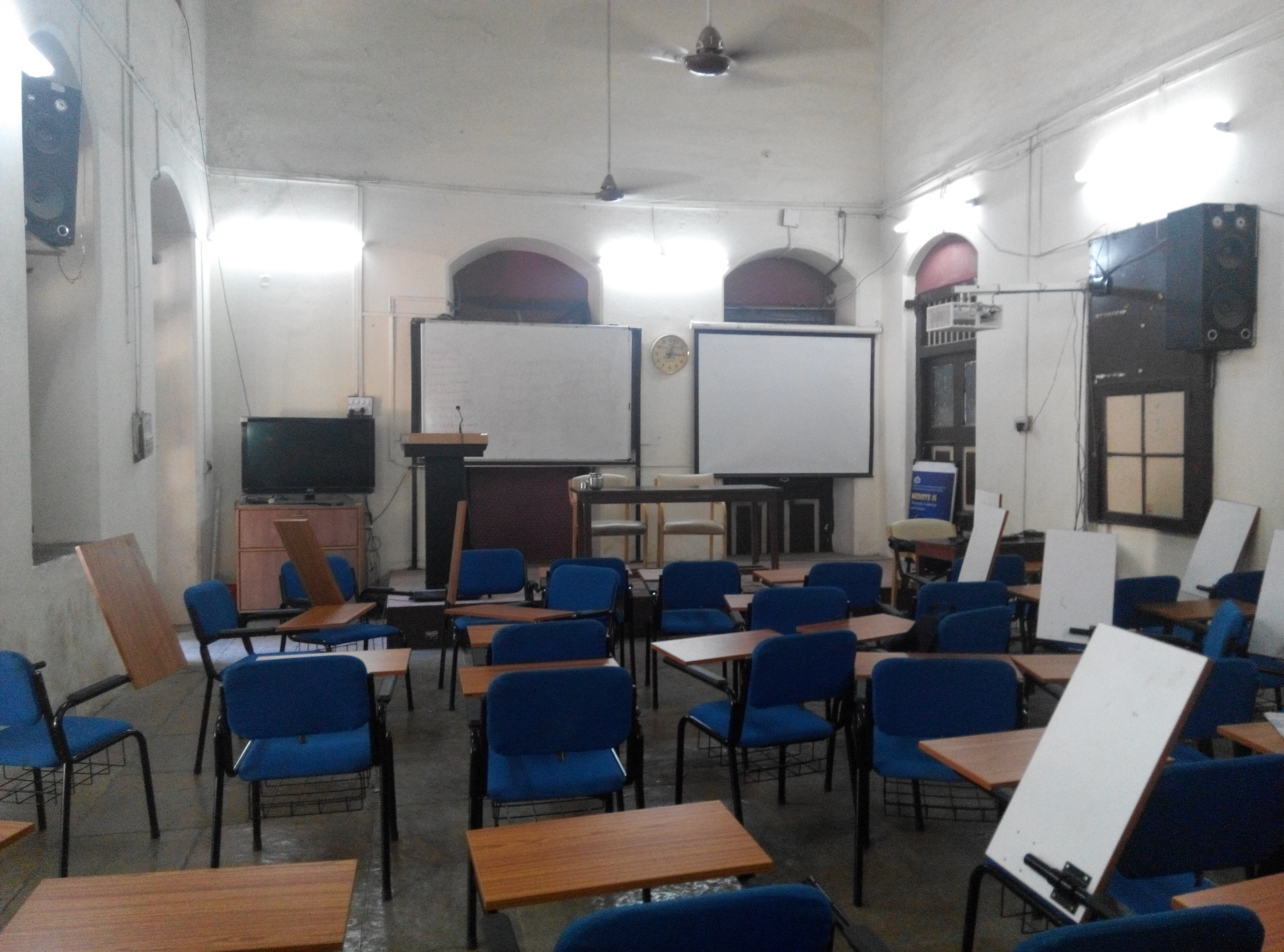
Lectures are held in this classroom

The course was made a one-year full-time degree course from July 1973. The department became a full-fledged regular department of the university in 1976. Following the international and national trend, nomenclature of the department was changed in 1983 from "Department of Journalism" to "Department of Communication and Journalism". The name of the degree awarded was also changed from B.J. to B.C.J.

A short-term part-time certificate course was instituted in 1979 in co-operation with the Pune Shramik Patrakar Sangh. It was upgraded to a Diploma in Journalism (Marathi Medium) course in 1986. The department has introduced a part-time post graduate Diploma in Journalism with English as medium of instruction from academic year 2003–04. Detailed information about these Diploma courses is available in separate booklets.

One-year Master of Communication and Journalism (MCJ) was introduced from the academic year 1993–94.

The department introduced credit-point based semester system with effect from academic year 2001–02.

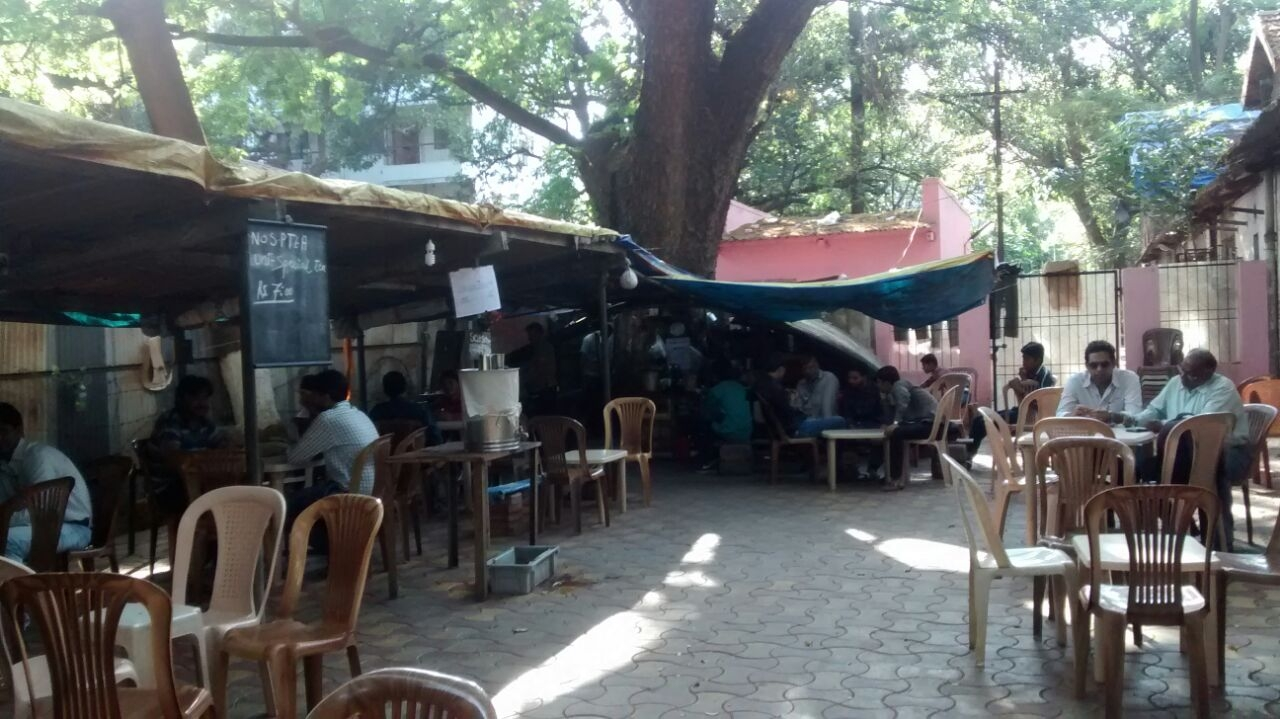
Canteen Ranade

The department changed the nomenclature of its Master's programme to Master of Arts (Mass Communication and Journalism) and revised its syllabus from academic year 2003–04.

== Courses Offered Now ==
- Ph.D. By Research.
- M.A.M.C.J. (Master of Arts Mass Communication and Journalism) Post-graduate, two-year, credit point-based full-time course. (Monday to Saturday 11.00 am to 05.00 pm)
- P.G.D.J. Post Graduate Diploma in Journalism Or Vruttapatrvidya Padvika (Marathi Medium Diploma) Post-graduate, one-year, part-time course.(Monday to Saturday 08.00 am to 10.30 am)
- P.G.D.M.M. (Post Graduate Diploma in Mass Media) Post-graduate, one-year, part-time. (Monday to Saturday 06.00 pm to 08.30 pm)
- P.G.C.P.J. (Post Graduate Certificate in Photo Journalism) Post-graduate, one-year, part-time Weekend.(Saturday and Sunday 8.00 am to 12.00 pm)

== Faculty ==
As of 17 October 2022, Dr. Ujjwala Barve is the Head of the department.
