= Nima Denzongpa =

Indian television series

- Genre: Drama
- Written by: Anantika Sahire
- Directed by: Sangeeta Ashish Rao; Dinesh Mahadev
- Starring: Surabhi Das; Akshay Kelkar; Iqbal Khan; Manish Raisinghan
- Music by: Sarthak Nakul
- Country of origin: India
- Original language: Hindi
- No. of seasons: 1
- No. of episodes: 270

Production
- Producers: Alind Srivastava; Nisaar Parvej
- Production locations: Sikkim; Mumbai
- Camera setup: Multi-camera
- Running time: 20-25 minutes
- Production company: Peninsula Pictures

Original release
- Network: Colors TV
- Release: 23 August 2021 – 2 September 2022

Nima Denzongpa is an Indian Hindi language social drama series that aired on Colors TV from 23 August 2021 to 2 September 2022. It starred Surabhi Das, Iqbal Khan, Manish Raisinghan and Akshay Kelkar.

== Plot ==
Nima Denzongpa is a young, kind-hearted and innocent girl from Sikkim. Suresh Mane, a sports boy from Mumbai, comes to Sikkim for a shoot with his manager. Nima and Suresh meet and eventually fall in love. A day before leaving, Suresh asks Nima to come with him to Mumbai, leaving Nima in a dilemma. Nima's mother learns the truth and tells her to do what she feels right. Nima chooses the love and goes to Mumbai, where she faces many insults. Suresh's mother, Sunita has fixed a relationship for him. Suresh marries Nima in court and Sunita pretends to accept Nima to save her reputation.

=== 6 years later ===
Nima and Suresh have two daughters, Siya and Manya. Sunita doesn't want a girl child and fixes Suresh's marriage with a Marathi girl Tulika. During the engagement, it is revealed that Nima is pregnant with her third child. Suresh manages to take some time from Sunita and Tulika. He agrees to marry Tulika only if Nima's child would not be a boy.

Nima gives birth to her third daughter, Naari. She is left alone with her daughters. Tulika and Suresh are married as per the deal. Tulika and Sunita create many difficulties for Nima. Soon, Tulika and Suresh have a son, Varun. Tulika fakes Varun's kidnapping with Sunita's help. Suresh angrily throws Nima out of the house. Manya is lost but is rescued and returned to Nima by a rich family named Goenka, who later offer Nima a job as their maid. Nima settles in a house in Suresh's neighbourhood with her daughters. Suresh decides to divorce Nima, being tired of quarrels with Tulika and Sunita. Nima too agrees and they part ways.

=== 20 years later ===
Siya, Manya and Naari have grown up. Tulika, Varun and Sunita are jealous of seeing Nima and her daughters' success. Siya gets a job in a bank where she meets Shiv. Soon they both become friends. Manya aspires to be a model and Naari is studying at a college. Manya meets Goenkas' son, Paras, who later offers her a job in his company. Suresh gets a driving job at Goenkas'.

Eventually, Shiv-Siya and Paras-Manya fall in love. Shiv is forced to marry Kanchan, leaving Siya heartbroken. Tulika throws Suresh and Sunita out of the house. Nima shelters them and Sunita regrets for her actions. Goenkas forces Paras to marry Mitali. Nima, Suman and Babita learn about Paras' relationship and help him, unaware that it's Manya. Paras runs away from the wedding and marries Manya in temple. However, Manya is revealed to be pregnant and Goenkas' have to accept her. Thus, Manya and Paras get married. Tulika realizes her mistakes and moves out with Suresh.

Later, Nima meets Virat Sethi, who hires her as a caretaker to his son, Krish. On Krish's request, Nima and Virat marry. Nima tells the truth to her family about marrying Virat. Virat's fiancée, Priyal and sister-in-law, Mona try to create problems between Krish, Virat and Nima, but in vain. Manya meets with an accident and miscarries due to Priyal. Sia marries Shiv after he divorces Kanchan.

Virat's brother, Alok, who is jealous of him, fakes his death and frames Virat, who goes missing. Suresh and Tulika return and help Nima to expose Alok. Later, Nima finds Virat, who has lost his memory and lives as Manav Deshmukh. He lives with a woman named Sujata, who claims as his wife. Eventually, Virat regains his memory. Sujata is revealed to be a serial killer and holds Virat captive. Nima saves Virat from her, risking her life and gets Sujata arrested. Finally, Nima and Virat reunite to live happily.

== Cast ==
=== Main ===
- Surabhi Das as Nima Denzongpa Sethi – Suresh's ex–wife; Virat's wife; Siya, Manya and Naari's mother; Goenka's ex–maid; Krish's caretaker and adoptive mother. (2021–2022)
- Akshay Kelkar as Suresh Mane – Sunita's son; Nima's ex–husband; Tulika's husband; Siya, Manya, Naari and Varun's father; Goenka's ex–driver; (2021–2022)
- Iqbal Khan as
  - Virat Sethi: Gulshan's youngest son; Alok's younger brother; Nima's boss turned husband; Krish's adoptive father; (2022)
    - Manish Raisinghan as Virat Sethi (2022) (after plastic surgery)
  - Roy Kumar: Virat's look-alike; an actor; Priyal's lover; (2022)

=== Recurring ===
- Usha Naik as Sunita Mane – Suresh's mother; Siya, Manya, Naari and Varun's grandmother. (2021-2022)
- Sharmila Shinde as Tulika Mane – Shankar's daughter; Suresh's second wife; Varun's mother. (2021–2022)
- Sushmita Singh as Siya Mane Salunkhe – Suresh and Nima's eldest daughter; Manya and Naari's sister; Varun's half-sister; Shiv's wife. (2021–2022)
  - Asmi Deo as Child Siya Mane (2021)
- Sonakshi Batra as Manya Mane Goenka – Suresh and Nima's second daughter; Siya and Naari's sister; Varun's half-sister; Paras's wife. (2021–2022)
  - Ravya Sadhwani as Child Manya Mane (2021)
- Sukanya Barua as Naari Mane – Suresh and Nima's youngest daughter; Siya and Manya's sister; Varun's half-sister. (2021–2022)
  - Unknown as Baby Naari Mane (2021)
- Sneh Mirani as Varun Mane – Suresh and Tulika's son; Siya, Manya and Naari's half-brother. (2021–2022)
  - Unknown as Baby Varun Mane (2021)
- Subhan Khan as Krish Sethi – Virat and Nima's adopted son (2022)
- Prabhat Chaudhary / Raghav Thakur as Paras Goenka – Suman and Dinesh's son; Babita's brother; Manya's husband (2021–2022)
  - Veer Bhanushali as Child Paras Goenka (2021)
- Chitransh Raj as Shiv Salunkhe – Kanchan's ex–husband; Siya's husband (2021–2022)
- Salman Shaikh as Mayank – Kanchan's ex–fiancé (2022)
- Rohit Kumar as Hemal – Paras's childhood friend (2021)
- Himani Sharma as Priyal – Mona's sister; Virat's ex–fiancé (2022)
- Pallavi Rao as Mona Sethi – Priyal's sister; Alok's wife; Simmi's mother (2022)
- Shiv Mishra as Alok Sethi – Gulshan's elder son; Virat's brother; Mona's husband; Simmi's father (2022)
- Palak Jain as Simmi Sethi – Alok and Mona's daughter (2022)
- Daljeet Soundh as Gulshan Sethi – Ashok and Virat's mother; Simmi's grandmother; Krish's adoptive grandmother (2022)
- Chaitrali Rode as Sarala – Nima's friend and well wisher (2021–2022)
- Abhishek Mohan Gaikwad as Shankar – Tulika's father; Varun's grandfather (2021–2022)
- Shweta Gautam as Suman Goenka – Dinesh's wife; Paras and Babita's mother (2021–2022)
- Hetal Puniwala as Dinesh Goenka – Pushpa's son; Suman's husband; Paras and Babita's father (2021–2022)
- Bhairavi Vaidya as Pushpa Goenka – Dinesh's mother; Paras and Babita's grandmother (2021–2022)
- Nishi Saxena as Babita Goenka – Suman and Dinesh's daughter; Paras's sister (2021–2022)
  - Aria Sakaria as Child Babita Goenka (2021)
- Deepak Verma as Baaky – Male servant at Goenka house (2021)
- Prakriti Patel as Kanchan Salgaonkar (formerly Salunkhe) – Shiv's ex–wife; Mayank's ex–fiancée (2021)
- Gargi Tripathi as Rani Goenka – Dinesh's aunt; Paras and Babita's grandaunt (2021–2022)
- Prashant Poojari as Bhola – Ranisa's guardian (2021)
- Akshita Singh Rajput as Mitali Bansal – Paras's ex–fiancée (2021)
- Dinesh Vadhva as Salman – Varun's friend (2021)
- Kailash Topnani as Raman – Manya's friend (2021)
- Sunita Rajwar as Mrs. Denzongpa – Nima's mother (2021)
- Supriya Pawar as Sujata – Virat's fake wife (2022)
- Anjali Ujawane as Sarita (2022)
- Saahitya Pansare as Tushar (2022)
