= Ase He Kanyadan =

Marathi-language television series

- Genre: Drama
- Starring: See below
- Country of origin: India
- Original language: Marathi
- No. of episodes: 150

Production
- Camera setup: Multi-camera
- Running time: 22 minutes

Original release
- Network: Zee Marathi
- Release: 24 January – 18 July 2015

Ase He Kanyadan is an Indian Marathi language television series which aired on Zee Marathi. The story deals with the father-daughter relationship. The series premiered from 24 January 2015 by replacing Jawai Vikat Ghene Aahe.

== Cast ==
- Sharad Ponkshe as Sadashiv Kirtane
- Madhura Deshpande as Gayatri Sadashiv Kirtane
- Prasad Jawade as Kartik
- Sulekha Talwalkar
- Avinash Narkar
- Uday Sabnis
- Radha Sagar
- Ninad Limaye
