= Haemolymph: Invisible Blood =

Haemolymph
- Directed by: Sudarshan Gamare
- Screenplay by: Sudarshan Gamare
- Story by: Sudarshan Gamare
- Based on: Begunah Qaidi by Abdul Wahid Sheikh
- Produced by: Saurabh More; Milind Jadhav
- Starring: Riyaz Anwar; Ruchira Jadhav; Rohit Kokate
- Cinematography: Rohan Rajan Mapuskar
- Edited by: HM
- Music by: Mujtaba Aziz Naza
- Production companies: Tikatbaari Productions; AB Films Entertainment; Adiman Films; ND9 Studios
- Distributed by: Angel's Dream Entertainment
- Release date: 27 May 2022
- Country: India
- Language: Hindi

Haemolymph: Invisible Blood is an Indian 2022 Hindi language Crime drama film written and directed by Sudarshan Gamare. The story is based on 'Wahid din Mohammed shaikh', who is one of the accused of the 7/11 serial bomb blast on the Mumbai local train. The film stars Riyaz Anwar, Ruchira Jadhav, Rohit Kokate, Neelam Kulkarni, Datta Jadhav and Sayli Bandkar. It was theatrically released in India on 27 May 2022.

== Cast ==
- Riyaz Anwar as Wahid Shaikh
- Ruchira Jadhav as Sajida Shaikh
- Rohit Kokate as Javed Shaikh
- Neelam Kulkarni as Wahids Mother
- Datta Jadhav as Wahids father
- Sayli Bandkar as Javeds wife
- Ankit Mhatre
- Sunil Tambe
- Vijaya Mahajan
- Sagar Pable

== Release ==
Haemolymph: Invisible Blood will be released theatrically on 27 May 2022.
