= Arundhati (2011 TV series) =

Indian television series

- Genre: Drama
- Created by: Ekta Kapoor
- Written by: Sameer Garud
- Screenplay by: Swapnil Mahaling
- Starring: See below
- Country of origin: India
- Original language: Marathi
- No. of episodes: 162

Production
- Producers: Ekta Kapoor; Shobha Kapoor
- Production locations: Mumbai, Maharashtra
- Camera setup: Multi-camera
- Running time: 22 minutes
- Production company: Balaji Telefilms

Original release
- Network: Zee Marathi
- Release: 10 October 2011 – 14 April 2012

Arundhati is an Indian Marathi-language soap opera which aired on Zee Marathi. It is created and produced by Ekta Kapoor under her banner Balaji Telefilms. It premiered from 10 October 2011 by replacing Bhagyalakshmi and ended on 14 April 2012 completing 162 episodes.

== Plot ==
Arundhati, a simple town girl works in a school for the blind and is loved by all. Digvijay is a successful business tycoon who is blind. His mother, Kamini, gets him married to Arundhati, without telling the bride or anyone else that her son is blind. On the wedding day, Digvijay trip and falls on the dias seeking help as a blind person does and the secret comes out. Arundhati had feelings for Digvijay but due to the fact which was kept secret, she thought of getting betrayed but later copes up and help Digvijay. Later he undergoes a surgery and gets his vision. Also, Arundhati starts getting taste of Kamini's cunning behavior and greed for wealth and property. Digvijay unknown of the fact Arundhati tells the truth but instead Kamini creates misunderstanding between the two. Later, Arundhati exposes Kamini and the family leaves the house and Kamini alone and settle away. Later, Kamini realises her mistakes and asks for forgiveness. Arundhati forgives but Digvijay doesn't. Later, Kamini finally convinces Digvijay and later dies due to a heart attack.

== Cast ==
- Bhakti Desai as Arundhati
- Prasad Jawade as Digvijay
- Ravindra Mahajani as Aabasaheb
- Ashwini Ekbote as Kamini
- Nikhil Rajeshirke as Shantanu
- Vikas Patil as Nitin
