= Swabhiman – Shodh Astitvacha =

Indian television series

- Genre: Drama; Romance
- Developed by: Leena Gangopadhyay
- Written by: Sushma Yakshi; Abhijeet Pendharkar
- Directed by: Kalpesh Kumbhar
- Starring: See below
- Theme music composer: Rohan-Rohan
- Opening theme: "Swabhiman Ha" by Priyanka Barve
- Country of origin: India
- Original language: Marathi
- No. of episodes: 699

Production
- Producers: Hemant Ruprell; Ranjeet Thakur
- Production locations: Pune, Maharashtra
- Editor: Shiva Murmu
- Camera setup: Multi-camera
- Running time: 22 minutes
- Production company: Frames Production

Original release
- Network: Star Pravah
- Release: 22 February 2021 – 6 May 2023

Related
- Mohor

Swabhiman – Shodh Astitvacha (transl. Self Respect – Search for Existence) is an Indian Marathi language television series that aired on Star Pravah. It premiered on 22 February 2021 and ended on 6 May 2023. It stars Akshar Kothari and Pooja Birari in lead roles. It is produced by Hemant Ruprell and Ranjeet Thakur under the banner of Frames Production. It is an official remake of Bengali TV series Mohor.

== Plot ==
Shantanu Suryavanshi, a guy with old-fashioned ideas, believes women shouldn't be independent. This belief stems from his past when his mom left him when he was little. Instead, he was raised by his not-so-nice aunt, Suparna, who really doesn't like Shantanu's mom.

On the other side of the story is Pallavi Shirsekar, a determined and strong-willed girl from a middle-class family. Her dad, Bhaskar, used to be a businessman, but things went south, and he faced bankruptcy. Despite these hardships, Pallavi has big dreams of making a mark in society and thinks women should be independent.

Now, Pallavi's family wants her to get married, especially since her sister Nandita had a tough time with a cruel husband named Gaurav, who was eyeing the family's wealth. Pallavi, not interested in marriage, escapes from her own engagement ceremony and seeks refuge at her teacher Aditi's house.

Here's the twist: Aditi is none other than Shantanu's long-lost mom, who deeply regrets leaving him. She wants to reconcile with Shantanu, but he's engaged to Niharika, a beautiful and wealthy girl. However, Niharika is not ready for marriage; she heads off to the US to pursue higher studies, leaving Shantanu in a bit of a dilemma.

Pallavi with the help of Aditi happens to join the college which belongs to suryavanshis(Aditis in laws). In the beginning Shantanu and Pallavi have a lot of fights but a series of events later they fall in love with each other and get married.

Soon Aditi re-enters the Suryavanshi house to try to reunite with her son. But Shantanus Mothi Aai doesn't want it and plots to Kill Aditi in which her son Vinayak helps her. Due to the bullet Aditi goes in Coma. Pallavi then finds the culprits and decides to punish them. Vinayak then decides to get his parents out of the way to gain the property but is caught red handed and killed by his wife. Shantanu accepts Aditi as his mother. Finally Pallavi is shown to be pregnant and the serial ends on a happy note.

== Cast ==
=== Main ===
- Pooja Birari as Pallavi Bhaskar Shirsekar / Pallavi Shantanu Suryavanshi – Indrayani and Bhaskar's younger daughter; Mrs. Shirsekar's granddaughter; Jr. Nandita's aunt; Gaurav's sister-in-law; Aditi and Prabhakar's daughter-in-law; Suparna, Purushottam, Vibhavari and Pradeep's niece-in-law; Vinayak, Meghna, Jyoti and Geeta's sister-in-law; Shantanu's wife.
- Akshar Kothari as Shantanu Prabhakar Suryavanshi – Aditi and Prabhakar's son; Suparna, Purushottam, Vibhavari and Pradeep's nephew; Vinayak, Jyoti and Geeta's cousin; Meghna's brother-in-law; Indrayani and Bhaskar's son-in-law; Mrs. Shirsekar's grandson-in-law; Gaurav, Nandita and Aseem's brother-in-law; Jr. Nandita's uncle; Pallavi's husband.

=== Recurring ===
- Asawari Joshi as Aditi Prabhakar Suryavanshi – Prabhakar's wife; Shantanu's mother; Pallavi's mother-in-law; Suparna, Purushottam, Vibhavari and Pradeep's sister-in-law; Meghna's aunt-in-law; Vinayak, Jyoti and Geeta's aunt.
- Ashok Shinde as Prabhakar Suryavanshi – Aditi's husband: Shantanu's father; Pallavi's father-in-law; Purushottam and Pradeep's brother; Suparna and Vibhavari's brother-in-law; Meghna's uncle-in-law; Vinayak, Jyoti and Geeta's uncle.
- Surekha Kudachi / Savita Prabhune as Suparna "Mothi Aai" Purushottam Suryavanshi – Purushottam's wife; Vinayak's mother; Meghna's mother-in-law; Aditi, Prabhakar, Vibhavari and Pradeep's sister-in-law; Pallavi's aunt-in-law; Shantanu, Jyoti and Geeta's aunt.
- Prasad Pandit / Milind Dastane as Purushottam "Mothe Kaka" Suryavanshi – Suparna's husband; Vinayak's father; Meghna's father-in-law; Prabhakar and Pradeep's brother; Aditi and Vibhavari's brother-in-law; Pallavi's uncle-in-law; Shantanu, Jyoti and Geeta's uncle.
- Ashu Datar as Pradeep Suryavanshi – Vibhavari's husband, Jyoti and Geeta's father, Purushottam and Prabhakar's brother; Pallavi and Meghna's uncle-in-law; Aditi and Suparna's brother-in-law; Shantanu and Vinayak's uncle.
- Mugdha Karnik as Vibhavari Pradeep Suryavanshi – Pradeep's wife; Jyoti and Geeta's mother; Suparna, Purushottam, Aditi and Prabhakar's sister-in-law; Pallavi and Meghna's aunt-in-law; Shantanu and Vinayak's aunt.
- Ambarish Deshpande as Vinayak Purushottam Suryavanshi – Purushottam and Suparna's son; Meghna's husband; Aditi, Prabhakar, Vibhavari and Pradeep's Nephew; Pallavi's brother-in-law; Shantanu, Jyoti and Geeta's cousin.
- Sanika Banaraswale / Trupti Jadhav as Meghna Vinayak Suryavanshi – Purushottam and Suparna's daughter-in-law; Vinayak's wife; Aditi, Prabhakar, Vibhavari and Pradeep's niece-in-law; Shantanu, Pallavi, Jyoti and Geeta's sister-in-law.
- Rutuja Kulkarni as Jyoti Pradeep Suryavanshi – Pradeep and Vibhavari's elder daughter; Geeta's elder sister; Aditi, Prabhakar, Suparna and Purushottam's niece; Meghna and Pallavi's sister-in-law; Vinayak and Shantanu's cousin.
- Manasi Mhatre as Geeta Pradeep Suryavanshi – Pradeep and Vibhavari's Younger daughter; Geeta's Younger sister; Aditi, Prabhakar, Suparna and Purushottam's niece; Meghna and Pallavi's sister-in-law; Vinayak and Shantanu's cousin.
- Ravindra Kulkarni as Bhaskar Shirsekar – Mrs. Shirsekar's mother; Indrayani's husband; Nandita, Aseem and Pallavi's father; Jr. Nandita's grandfather; Gaurav and Shantanu's father-in-law.
- Madhavi Soman as Indrayani Bhaskar Shirsekar – Bhaskar's wife; Mrs. Shirsekar's daughter-in-law; Nandita, Aseem and Pallavi's mother; Jr. Nandita's Grandmother; Gaurav and Shantanu's mother-in-law.
- Amita Kulkarni as Nandita Bhaskar Shirsekar / Nandita Gaurav Sawant – Indrayani and Bhaskar's elder daughter; Mrs. Shirsekar's granddaughter; Jr. Nandita's mother; Aseem and Pallavi's sister; Gaurav's wife; Shantanu's sister-in-law.
- Kaushik Kulkarni as Gaurav Sawant – Nandita's husband; Indrayani and Bhaskar's son-in-law; Mrs. Shirsekar's grandson-in-law; Jr. Nandita's father; Aseem and Pallavi's brother-in-law.
- Dipesh Thackeray as Aseem Bhaskar Shirsekar – Indrayani and Bhaskar's son; Mrs. Shirsekar's grandson; Nandita and Pallavi's brother; Jr. Nandita's uncle; Gaurav and Shantanu's brother-in-law.
- Pratibha Goregaonkar as Mrs. Shirsekar – Bhaskar's mother; Indrayani's mother-in-law; Nandita, Aseem and Pallavi's grandmother; Jr. Nandita's Great-Grandmother; Gaurav and Shantanu's grandmother-in-law.

=== Others ===
- Disha Pardeshi as Niharika Mahajan – Shantanu's ex-girlfriend; Pallavi's Professor turned arch rival; Suparna, Purushotttam and Pradeep's partner-in-crime.
- Abhishek Rahalkar / Nakul Ghanekar as ACP Nachiket Mhatre – Assistant Commissioner of Police Inspector and Pallavi's friend.
- Prashant Nigade as Baban – A peon at S.S. Suryavanshi College
- Ruchir Gurav as Mayank – Geeta, Reema, Pallavi and Vaidehi's friend.
- Pranita Acharekar as Reema – Mayank, Geeta, Pallavi and Vaidehi's friend.
- Prajakta Amburle as Vaidehi – Mayank, Geeta, Reema and Pallavi's friend.
- Amol Girase as Ayush – Jyoti and Anshika's friend.
- Rajashri Parulekar as Anshika – Jyoti, and Ayush's friend

=== Guests Appearances ===
- Sunil Barve as Surya from Sahkutumb Sahparivar
- Harshada Khanvilkar as Saundarya from Rang Majha Vegla

== Production ==
=== Casting ===
Pooja Birari was selected for Pallavi's role in an interview Pooja stated that, "On the occasion of 'Swabhiman' series, I got an opportunity to play a dream role." Akshar Kothari was cast for Shantanu's role in an interview with The Times of India he stated, "After two years, I am making a comeback on the small screen. It is a great pleasure to do a TV show like Swabhimaan - Shodh Astitvacha. My TV journey started from Bandh Reshmache, Aaradhana, Chhoti Malkin and now Swabhiman. My entire look from the show is also very different from my previous roles". Asawari Joshi reprising the role of Professor Aditi in an interview with The Times of India she stated, " After many years, I am making a comeback on Marathi television. As I worked in Hindi, I lost touch with the Marathi industry. However, I accepted the role as I got a hearty project on the occasion of this Swabhiman TV show".

== Reception ==
=== Ratings ===
| Week | Year | BARC Viewership | | Ref. |
| Week | Year | TRP | Rank | Ref. |
|---|---|---|---|---|
| Week 20 | 2021 | 3.3 | 5 | |
| Week 21 | 2021 | 3.8 | 5 | |

== Adaptations ==
| Language | Title | Original release | Network(s) | Last aired | Notes |
|---|---|---|---|---|---|
| Bengali | Mohor মোহর | 28 October 2019 | Star Jalsha | 3 April 2022 | Original |
| Kannada | Sarasu ಸರಸು | 11 November 2020 | Star Suvarna | 28 August 2021 | Remake |
| Telugu | Guppedantha Manasu గుప్పెడంత మనసు | 7 December 2020 | Star Maa | 31 August 2024 | Remake |
| Hindi | Shaurya Aur Anokhi Ki Kahani शौर्य और अनोखी की कहानी | 21 December 2020 | StarPlus | 24 July 2021 | Remake |
| Malayalam | Koodevide കൂടെവിടെ | 4 January 2021 | Asianet | 22 July 2023 | Remake |
| Tamil | Kaatrukkenna Veli காற்றுக்கென்ன வேலி | 18 January 2021 | Star Vijay | 30 September 2023 | Remake |
| Marathi | Swabhiman – Shodh Astitvacha स्वाभिमान – शोध अस्तित्वाचा | 22 February 2021 | Star Pravah | 6 May 2023 | Remake |
