= Akshar Kothari =

Indian television actor

- Born: Solapur, Maharashtra, India
- Occupation: Actor
- Years active: 2011–present
- Notable work: Bandh Reshmache; Swabhiman – Shodh Astitvacha; Lakshmichya Paulanni
- Spouse(s): Mansi Naik (m. 2015; div. 2019) Sarika Khasnis (m. 2025)

Akshar Kothari is an Indian television actor predominantly working in the Marathi language. He is best known for his role as Shantanu on the daily soap Swabhiman – Shodh Astitvacha.

== Personal life ==
Kothari was married with Mansi Naik in 2015. They divorced in 2019.

== Career ==
In 2011, Kothari had a role in the Star Pravah show titled Band Reshmache. He later had a role in Colors Marathi's serial Chahool.

In 2021, Kothari starred in Mumbai Diaries 26/11 as Inspector Mayank Bhatt and played a role opposite Pooja Birari in Star Pravah's show Swabhiman – Shodh Astitvacha.

== Filmography ==
=== Television ===
| Year | Title | Role | Ref. |
|---|---|---|---|
| 2011–2012 | Bandh Reshmache | Shekhar | |
| 2013 | Aaradhana | Sambhav Mahajan | |
| 2014–2016 | Kamala | Devashish | |
| 2017–2018 | Chahool | Sarjerao Bhosale | |
| 2018–2019 | Chhoti Malkin | Shridhar Chandorkar | |
| 2021 | Mumbai Diaries 26/11 | Inspector Mayank Bhat | |
| 2021–2023 | Swabhiman – Shodh Astitvacha | Shantanu Suryavanshi | |
| 2023–2025 | Lakshmichya Paulanni | Advait Chandekar | |

=== Films ===
| Year | Title | Role | Notes |
|---|---|---|---|
| 2020 | Dafan | Inspector Apte | Short film |
| 2025 | Parinati | Nilkhil | |
