= Reshma Shinde =

Indian television actress (born 1987)

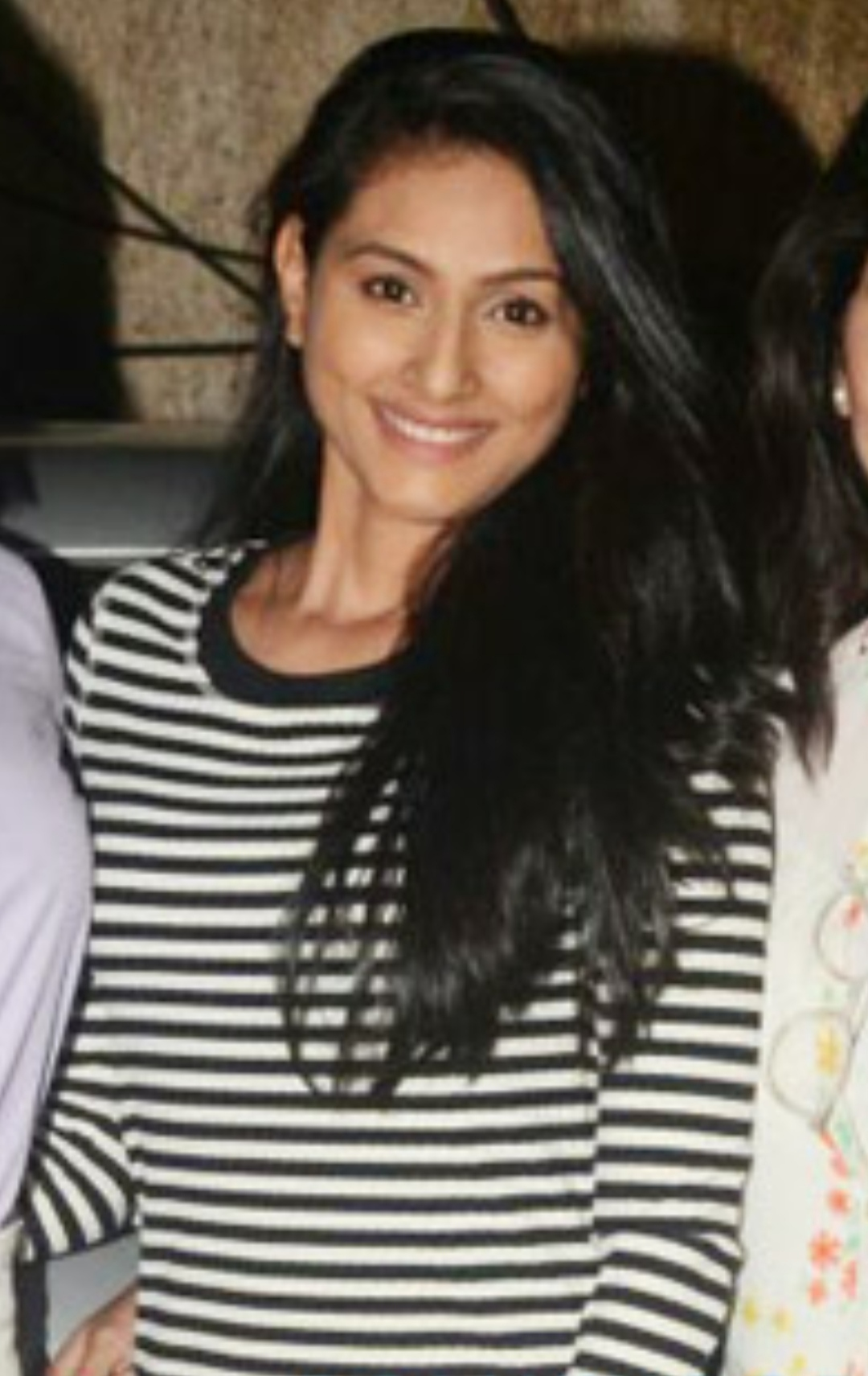
- Born: 2 December 1987 (age 38); Mumbai, Maharashtra, India
- Occupation: Actress
- Years active: 2009–present
- Known for: Rang Majha Vegla
- Spouses: Abhijeet Chougule (m. 2012; div. 2017) Pavan (m. 2024)

Reshma Shinde is an Indian Marathi actress. She is known for her lead role in Rang Majha Vegla as Deepa.

== Career ==
In 2009, she participated in Maharashtracha Superstar as a contestant. After that she received an offer from the television show Bandh Reshmache on Star Pravah. In 2014, she got a role in Lagori - Maitri Returns as Purva. In 2015, she played a negative role in Nanda Saukhya Bhare. In 2016, she had a role in Chahool, a horror television show as Shambhavi. She also played supporting roles in Marathi films. In 2019, she appeared in Rang Majha Vegla as Deepa. Since 2024, she is playing the role of Janaki Randive in Gharo Ghari Matichya Chuli.

== Television ==
Year	Serial	Role	Channel	Ref.
2010-11	Anolkhi Disha	Komal	Star Pravah	Episode 10 Icchhapurti (Episodic role)
2011–2012	Bandh Reshmache		Star Pravah	Supporting Role
2013	Vivah Bandhan		ETV Marathi	Negative Role
2014–2015	Lagori – Maitri Returns	Poorva	Star Pravah	
2015–2016	Nanda Saukhya Bhare	Sampada Deshpande	Zee Marathi	
2017	Chahool	Sambhavi	Colors Marathi	
2019	Kesari Nandan	Bijli Zorawar Singh	Colors TV	
2019–2023	Rang Majha Vegla	Deepa Inamdar	Star Pravah	
2024–present	Gharo Ghari Matichya Chuli	Janaki Randive	Star Pravah	

=== Reality Shows ===
Year	Show	Role	Channel
2009–2010	Maharashtracha Superstar	Contestant	Zee Marathi
2022–2025	Aata Hou De Dhingana	Deepa Inamdar	Star Pravah

=== Films ===
Year	Film	Role
2010	Janya	
2016	Lalbaugchi Rani	Cameo Role
2017	Rang He Premache Rangeele	Samiksha
2017	Deva Ek Atrangi	Shruti
