= Shaurya Aur Anokhi Ki Kahani =

Indian television series

- Genre: Drama; Romance
- Developed by: Leena Gangopadhyay
- Written by: Satyam Tripathi; Munisha Rajpal; Rajesh Rajpal
- Screenplay by: Ila Bedi Dutta; Damini Kanwal Shetty; Bhavna Vyas
- Story by: Ila Bedi Dutta; Mitali Bhattacharya; Damini Kanwal Shetty
- Directed by: Imtiaz Punjabi; Samir Kulkarni; Rakesh Kumar; Vikram Ghai
- Creative director: Manjari Mukul
- Starring: Debattama Saha; Karanvir Sharma
- Theme music composer: Sargam Jassu; Nakash Aziz
- Composer: Kingshuk Chakravarty
- Country of origin: India
- Original language: Hindi
- No. of seasons: 1
- No. of episodes: 186

Production
- Producers: Tony Singh; Deeya Singh; Jashan Singh; Gia Singh
- Cinematography: Hanoz Kerawala; Raju Gauli
- Editors: Jaskaran Singh; Omkar Singh
- Camera setup: Multi-camera
- Running time: 22–24 minutes (approx.)
- Production company: DJ's a Creative Unit

Original release
- Network: Star Plus
- Release: 21 December 2020 – 24 July 2021

Related
- Mohor

Shaurya Aur Anokhi Ki Kahani (transl. Shaurya and Anokhi's Story) is an Indian drama television series that aired from 21 December 2020 to 24 July 2021 on StarPlus. The series is a remake of Star Jalsha's Bengali series Mohor. Produced under DJ's Creative Unit, it starred Debattama Saha as Anokhi Bhalla and Karanvir Sharma as Shaurya Sabherwal. It was replaced by Zindagi Mere Ghar Aana in its timeslot.

== Plot ==
The story begins with Shaurya Sabherwal's engagement with his longtime girlfriend, Shagun Kapoor. However, on the engagement day, Shagun reveals to Shaurya that she is willing to go to Cambridge to study further even though she earlier had reached a middle ground with Shaurya where he had agreed for her to continue as a guest professor at his family's reputed Sabherwal Institute of Arts and Commerce (SIAC). A reluctant Shaurya asks her to choose between a life with him and Cambridge. As Shagun chooses Cambridge, Shaurya decides to call off the engagement. On the other hand, it's seen that Anokhi Bhalla, in Kapurthala, studies in the same college in which Aastha, a professor, is highly supportive of Anokhi. Anokhi participates and wins in a debate competition where she is awarded by none other than Shaurya, who is the Guest of Honor of the competition. After the competition, Aastha who is Shaurya's estranged mother, approaches Shaurya and tries to talk to him but they end up arguing and ultimately hurt each other.

Anokhi's father Ramesh, fixes her marriage with an orthodox and alcoholic person, Monty, much to Anokhi, Babli, and Rama's reluctance. Anokhi's in-laws permit her to continue her studies after marriage in Toronto, Canada. However, the actual intentions of the family are revealed when she overhears Monty's conversation wherein he addresses wives as "glorified servants" and reveals his unwillingness to allow Anokhi to study once in Canada. Anokhi begs her father to stop her marriage, but he locks her in her room. Later, Babli and Rama learn of Monty's ugly side. They free Anokhi from her forced marriage and help her escape. Anokhi escapes and arrives at Aastha's house. Aastha facilitates her admission at SIAC by requesting her estranged husband, Shaan, with whom she still shares a strained but warm bond it seems.

Anokhi arrives at Chandigarh where on the very first day she is caught by the police who misunderstand her to be engaged in illegal activities but Shaurya helps to rescue her. The next day at the college admission interview, Shaurya bombards Anokhi with questions, but she does well and is selected. Aastha arrives at SIAC to help Anokhi be admitted by arranging for her documents and fees where she meets Shaan and Shaurya after 25 years. Shaurya is hurt when he sees his mother fighting for a random girl while she never cared or fought for him. He reminisces his bittersweet childhood memories and craves motherly love.

On the very first day of college, Anokhi is ragged by her classmates who insult her and then lock her in the classroom, traumatizing her. Shaurya rescues her and helps to catch and punish the culprits. Elsewhere, Raja, Anokhi's brother, is agitated at the family's insult due to Anokhi running away from her marriage with Aastha's help. He shoots Aastha, who is later rushed to a local hospital by Anokhi's parents. Shaan moves her to a hospital in Chandigarh where she is then operated on. Anokhi and Shaan worry about Aastha as her health deteriorates. Shaurya wishes to meet Aastha but is stopped by Devi. Aware of Aastha's deteriorating health, Gayatri insists Shaurya to meet Aastha. Late at night, Shaurya goes to meet Aastha secretly, revives her and leaves silently with only Aastha noticing him. Later, an enraged Devi confronts Aastha. Shaurya overhears their conversation and misunderstands Aastha and hurls accusations at her. Anokhi, who hears this, defends Aastha. Back home, Devi blackmails Shaan to divorce Aastha.

Aastha tells Anokhi about Shaurya's approaching birthday. Anokhi plans to bring together Shaurya and Aastha for the celebration and pesters Shaurya for the same who sternly refuses. Later, Aastha comes to Shaurya after his birthday party to pour her heart out to him. Shaurya, who was being constantly pestered by Anokhi regarding Aastha since long time also bursts out his buried pain and anger. Depressed Aastha checks out from the hospital and leaves without telling anyone. While searching for Aastha, Shaurya and Anokhi come across ACP Ahir. When Shaurya and Anokhi go to search Aastha in a market, a riot breaks out where an explosion there injures Anokhi. Shaurya rescues her and has her hospitalized. However, Anokhi misunderstands that Ahir saved her and blames Shaurya for leaving her alone in danger. This hurts Shaurya who cared for Anokhi ignoring his own injury but later she learns the truth. Elsewhere, Shaan finds Aastha. When Aastha is found, Shaurya apologizes for his harsh words but tells Aastha to have no hope to improve their relationship.

To separate Shaurya from Aastha and Anokhi, Tej plans to appoint him as the chairman of their college's new branch at Patiala. This is when Shaurya realizes that he is falling for Anokhi. He resigns as a professor from SIAC. Later in the night he saves Anokhi from being kidnapped. Next day, when Anokhi and Shaurya go to file a complaint, they see Ahir flirting with Anokhi but Anokhi does not recognise it. Irked Shaurya vents his frustration on Anokhi when she insists on knowing what's bothering him. Anokhi couldn't tolerate the insult and decides to return to her hometown, Kapurthala. To stop Anokhi from leaving for Kapurthala, Shaurya asks her to appear for the Economics Preliminary examination. She tops the examination but is accused of cheating. She was on the verge of rustication, but Shaurya proves her innocence fighting against his own family. Even though she was proven innocent and despite Shaurya's insistence, she doesn't change her decision to leave the college.

Elsewhere, Aastha and Shaan file for a divorce. Even though they separate legally, Shaan decides to start afresh with Aastha against his family's wishes. On the other hand, Shaurya convinces Anokhi to continue her studies at SIAC and arranges for a room in the college hostel for her to stay. Devi afraid of Shaurya and Anokhi's growing closeness contacts Shagun who was already in Chandigarh for some reasons. Amidst this, Shaurya decides to inform Anokhi of his feelings and goes to Anokhi's hostel when she doesn't answer her calls. Drenched in the rain, he falls sick in her room and couldn't express.

Later, Shaurya decides to confess his love to Anokhi on Holi. However, his plans are spoiled because of ACP Ahir, who arrests Shaurya because of his personal grudge against him after Shaurya accidentally hit Ahir's car. At the police station, ACP Ahir reveals to Shaurya that he has feelings for Anokhi. Shaurya warns him to stay away from Anokhi. On the day of Holi, Anokhi eagerly anticipates Shaurya's arrival. However, she begins to worry when she sees Shaurya's family arrive at the college without him. She calls Shaurya to know his whereabouts but is surprised to hear ACP Ahir's voice on the other line, who tells her that Shaurya is in lock-up. Anokhi, flabbergasted, travels to the police station, confronts ACP, has a conversation with Shaurya and leaves. Anokhi returns to the college and soon finds Shaurya there as well, who is released from jail after apologizing to ACP Ahir just for Anokhi's sake.

Shaurya and Anokhi have a great time celebrating Holi which is seen by Shagun. Seeing that Shaurya has moved on and is smitten with someone else, she prepares to go. However, Devi convinces her to stay. Devi helps Shagun take up the vacant seat of the professor for Economics at SIAC. Shaurya, though reluctant, agrees for the betterment of the institution and the students. Shagun confesses his feelings to Shaurya and asks him to reconsider their relationship. Shaurya tries to explain that he likes Anokhi now and offers Shagun to either leave for UK or stay as a colleague only at SIAC.

Later, Shaurya asks Anokhi to dine with him on a date. Anokhi, ecstatic, agrees. Later, Devi makes a plan and sends Shagun to the date where Anokhi misunderstands Shaurya and runs away. Shaurya arranges the date again but Anokhi isn't ready to join him. Out of frustration and despair, Shaurya confesses his feelings to Anokhi, but she thinks that he is playing with her feelings and taking revenge on her.

A heartbroken Shaurya goes to Goa to have some space. Kanchan explains Anokhi about Shaurya's love and helps her reach Goa where Babli and ACP Ahir also arrive searching for her. In Goa, Shaurya arranges a lavish birthday party for Anokhi and plans to propose her, but Devi foils the plan. Anokhi misunderstands Shaurya and decides to sever ties. Shaurya tells Devi that he loves Anokhi and goes go to clear the misunderstanding but Anokhi refuses to hear him. Devastated Shaurya has an accident. Aastha goes to meet Shaurya and fights with Devi about her rights over Shaurya. Aastha learns about Shaurya and Anokhi's relationship and is happy. Shagun turns Anokhi against Shaurya, so she decides to move on from Shaurya without allowing him to tell his side of the story.

Shaurya fights his family to go and meet Anokhi, but goes missing on the way which worries the Sabherwals and Aastha. Shagun confronts Anokhi and asks her about Shaurya. Anokhi, having decided to move on from Shaurya ignores him being missing, but later learns that he was kidnapped by Vineet. She tells the Sabherwals that her sister's husband kidnapped Shaurya. After much effort, she finds Shaurya, where the Sabherwals arrive and leave with Shaurya while Anokhi leaves him behind alone and decides to go back to Chandigarh. The next day, Shaurya searches for Anokhi, but the receptionist tells him that she has left. Shaurya tries to follow Anokhi but receives the news of Devi's minor heart attack and rushes to the villa. Devi asks Shaurya to get engaged to Shagun, but he denies it. Devi feigns a heart attack, and blackmails Shaurya to get engaged to Shagun.

The next day, Shaurya goes to Chandigarh and meets Anokhi where they confess their love for each other. However, later Anokhi, not willing to risk her career, leaves Shaurya. Shaurya not willing to let Anokhi fills vermilion in Anokhi's hairline, making her Mrs. Anokhi Shaurya Sabherwal. Even though Shaurya is happy about the marriage, Anokhi is furious at Shaurya for deciding without asking her. She puts a condition for him to accept his mother into his life for her to consider the marriage valid as she blames him for not fighting for his mother's rights without even knowing about Shaurya's abandonment and pain. Yet Shaurya agrees to all her conditions just for his love.

Shaurya goes to bring back Aastha, but she refuses to return. Shaurya visits Anokhi to tell her about Aastha's decision where the couple shares a few romantic moments. Ahir proposes to Anokhi for marriage where she refuses and tells him the truth of her marriage. Elsewhere, Anokhi is selected for an Economics seminar in Delhi where Shaurya plans a romantic drive. Due to rain, they become isolated and share romantic moments. Shaurya tells Anokhi why he hates his mother. Later, Shagun tracks down Shaurya and Anokhi, and learns about Shaurya's marriage with Anokhi. At the seminar, Shaurya motivates Anokhi and helps her win the competition and they both celebrate.

Back to Chandigarh, Shagun tells the Sabherwals about Shaurya's marriage about which they confront Shaurya, but he remains firm and says that he loves Anokhi and thus married her. He then officially proposes Anokhi with a ring. The next day, Tej and Devi cunningly send Shaurya to Patiala, and in Shaurya's absence, they rusticate Anokhi from college and hostel. On the way to Patiala, Shaurya goes to meet Aastha and reconciles with her. When he learns of Anokhi's rustication, he becomes angry at the Sabherwals and leaves for Chandigarh. He confronts the Sabherwals but Tej refuses to accept Anokhi as the daughter-in-law, so Shaurya leaves Sabherwal mansion to stay with Anokhi. However, Tej meets Anokhi privately and blackmails her into leaving Shaurya or else claims that he will disown Shaurya and ruin his career. Tej successfully encourages Anokhi to leave Shaurya. She hides in ACP Ahir's basement without the knowledge of Shaurya, who is desperately looking for her. With the help of ACP Ahir, he finds Anokhi. When he tries to talk to her, she shouts at him, stating that she does not accept their marriage and that he should go away. Shaurya reluctantly leaves and goes to the Sabherwal mansion, telling his family that the story of Shaurya and Anokhi is over, much to their delight. He then goes into his room and completely breaks down.

The next day in college Anokhi faints, but Shaurya revives her. Shaurya drops Anokhi home and discovers that the reason behind the breakup is something else. Shaurya forces her to reveal everything. On hearing the truth while Anokhi tries to apologize to Shaurya, he is disappointed as Anokhi didn't take a stand for their love and decided to leave him just like his mother did. He proclaims that their relationship is over and leaves the house. Later on, Shaurya brings Shaan, Aastha, Babli and Ahir together and plans to marry Anokhi again with all the rituals and marital vows but they decide to keep it a secret from Anokhi for the time-being. While Anokhi regrets her actions for losing Shaurya forever, Shaurya goes to Kapurthala to meet the Bhallas to convince them for the marriage. They agree wholeheartedly since the proposal is from such a successful boy. The next day, Shaurya confronts Tej and announces in front of the Sabherwals that he will marry Anokhi again, to everyone's surprise. He also informs that Aastha will be a part of the ceremony. Later at the college, Anokhi learns about Shaurya's marriage but is under the illusion that he is marrying Shagun. Shaurya then asks Anokhi if she would be able to prepare decorations for the wedding alongside Babli. Anokhi reluctantly agrees showing that she can move on. Wedding preparations and festivities begin.

On the day of shagan, Kanchan tells Shaurya about Devi's fake heart attack leaving Shaurya completely broken. He confronts Devi and tells her that they have lost his trust. While Anokhi continues to believe that Shaurya will marry Shagun, Aastha and Babli conduct the rituals of shagan stealthily without making her feel suspicious about anything. The next day, for the Mehndi, Shaurya secretly makes the Mehndi artist write his name on Anokhi's hand, leaving her surprised. By the end of the ceremony, unable to handle herself, and on Reema's insistence, Anokhi ends up confessing her love for Shaurya and requests him to stop the wedding. At that moment, Shaurya reveals that it's their wedding and tells that this was a plan to make Anokhi realise that they cannot live without each other and she shouldn't give up on their love. They embrace as both the Bhallas and the Sabherwals join in their happiness. During the haldi function Ramesh apologizes to his daughters and reconciles with them. On the other side, Devi who was so far away from the wedding ceremonies arrives as well. After the haldi function, both Shaurya and Anokhi prepare for their wedding.

On the day of the wedding, Shaurya and his family arrive with baraat. Later, Tej arrives as well and Shaurya and Anokhi seek his blessings. Soon Anokhi is informed that her sociology exam has been preponed to the same date and time as the wedding mahurat. Anokhi feels worried and arrives at the Mandap sobbing. When Shaurya becomes aware of the exam, he asks Anokhi to prioritize her exam over marriage. Anokhi sits for the exam, but she takes too long and it seems that she will miss the wedding muhurat but Shaurya ensures that doesn't happen by arranging for the wedding setup at the college itself. Shaurya and Anokhi officially marry. Anokhi chooses to live in Sabherwal House when asked by Shaurya where she intends to go after marriage. At the reception, a guest asks her about her planning for further studies, Devi intervenes and replies that she won't study anymore as she is now the daughter-in-law of their house, much to Anokhi's dismay. Later Shaurya assures Anokhi about her career and they consummate their marriage.

=== A few days later ===
Alok tries to molest a student, Priyanka, but she escapes and lodges a complaint against him. Anokhi supports her, to the Sabherwal family's dismay. Shaurya too supports Anokhi as he discovers the evidence against Alok. However, Shagun supports Alok and asks Priyanka to make a false recording against Anokhi. The Sabherwals expel Anokhi from the house without Shaurya's knowledge who is busy collecting proofs in favor of Anokhi. He makes Priyanka blurt out the whole truth of the matter. Anokhi is proven innocent, Shagun is expelled from college. Shaurya leaves Sabherwal mansion to support and live with Anokhi. Thus, Sabherwals realise their mistake and expel Alok from the house and apologise to Shaurya, Anokhi and Aastha. The Sabherwals reunite and the show ends from where it started, SIAC.

== Cast ==
=== Main ===
- Debattama Saha as Anokhi Bhalla Sabherwal: Rama and Ramesh's younger daughter; Babli and Raja's sister; Shaurya's wife; Aastha's ex-student; Monty's ex-fiancée. (2020–2021)
- Karanvir Sharma as Shaurya Sabherwal: Aastha and Shaan's son; Devi and Tej's foster son; Yash, Kitty and Bebo's cousin; Anokhi's husband; Shagun's ex-fiancée. (2020–2021)

=== Recurring ===
- Alka Kaushal as Devi Sabherwal: Tej's wife; Shaurya's aunt/foster mother; She doesn't have her own child and considers Shaurya as her son, she hates Aastha and thinks that she will snatch her son, she with her husband forced Astha to leave and brainwashed Shaurya against his parents (2020–2021)
- Sooraj Thapar as Tej Sabherwal: Patriarch of Sabherwals'; Shaan and Alok's brother; Devi's husband; Shaurya's uncle/foster father; He believes in patriarchal norm of society and wants to continue the traditions his father started, he with his wife forced his brother's wife to leave and brainwashed Shaurya against his parents (2020–2021)
- Khalid Siddiqui as Shaan Sabherwal: Tej and Alok's brother; Aastha's former husband; Shaurya's father; Anokhi's father-in-law (2020–2021)
- Deepa Parab as Aastha Kashyap : Shaan's former wife; Shaurya's mother; Anokhi's ex-professor turned mother in law(2020–2021)
- Hitesh Bharadwaj as ACP Ahir Chattwal: Shaurya and Anokhi's well-wisher (2021)
- Bhavna Chauhan / Swarda Thigale as Shagun Kapoor: Shaurya's ex-fiancée and lover (2020–2021)
- Pankaj Kalra as Ramesh Bhalla: Rama's husband; Babli, Raja and Anokhi's father (2020–2021)
- Pyumori Mehta Ghosh / Aparna Ghoshal as Rama Bhalla: Ramesh's wife; Babli, Raja and Anokhi's mother (2020–2021)
- Falaq Naaz as Babli Bhalla: Rama and Ramesh's elder daughter; Anokhi and Raja's sister; Vineet's ex-wife (2020–2021)
- Rajvir Chauhan as Pawan "Raja" Bhalla: Rama and Ramesh's son; Babli and Anokhi's brother (2020–2021)
- Anuj Kohli as Vineet Bhatia: Babli's abusive ex-husband (2020–2021)
- Ayushi Bhatia as Reema: Anokhi's college friend and well wisher (2020–2021)
- Harsh Vashisht as Alok Sabherwal: Tej and Shaan's brother; Gayatri's husband; Yash, Kitty and Bebo's father (2020–2021)
- Eva Shirali as Gayatri Sabherwal: Alok's wife; Yash, Kitty and Bebo's mother (2020–2021)
- Gulshan Nain as Yash Sabherwal: Gayatri and Alok's elder son; Kitty and Bebo's brother; Shaurya's cousin; Kanchan's husband (2020–2021)
- Reema Vohra as Kanchan Sabherwal: Yash's wife (2020–2021)
- Trishala Idnani as Kitty Sabherwal: Gayatri and Alok's younger daughter; Yash and Bebo's sister; Shaurya's cousin (2020–2021)
- Sindhu Reddy as Bebo Sabherwal: Gayatri and Alok's elder daughter; Yash and Kitty's sister; Shaurya's cousin; Anmol's love interest (2020–2021)
- Jitendra Nokewal as Anmol Arora: Pratap's son; Kitty's college friend; Bebo's love interest (2020–2021)
- Poonam Sirnaik as Mrs. Bhalla/Biji: Ramesh's mother; Rama's mother-in-law; Babli, Raja and Anokhi's grandmother (2020–2021)
- Arup Pal as Mr. Kapoor: Shagun's father (2020)
- Shilpa Kataria Singh as Mrs. Kapoor: Shagun's mother (2020)
- Lalit Singh as Friend: College friends of Anokhi (2021)
- Gautam Handa as Monty Khanna: Anokhi's ex-fiancée (2020)
- Firoz Ali as Pratap Arora: Anmol's father

== Production ==
=== Development ===
Before its premiere, it was titled as Shaurya – Ek Anokhi Kahani and the first promo of the series was released, but soon, the earlier promo was discarded and the title was changed to Shaurya Aur Anokhi Ki Kahani.

On 20 December 2020, fire broke out on the sets of the series and the shoot was disrupted for a while.

=== Training ===
Debattama Saha who was cast as Anokhi preparing for which she said, "Punjabi as a language was new to me so I had to work hard on that. I improved my skills during various workshops I attended".

=== Filming ===
Based on the backdrop of Punjab, the series is mainly filmed at the sets at Film City in Mumbai while the initial sequences were shot in Patiala in early December 2020.

On 13 April 2021, Chief Minister of Maharashtra, Uddhav Thackeray announced a sudden curfew due to increased COVID-19 cases, while the production halted from 14 April 2021. Soon, the team of the series decided to move their shooting location to Goa until the next hearing. After the sudden lockdown in Goa, the crew further shifted to Hyderabad to continue with their shooting until the next hearing.

=== Release ===
The first promo of the series was released on 2 December 2020 featuring the leads Debattama Saha and Karanvir Sharma.

== Reception ==
=== Ratings ===
In the UK, the series had its peak viewership with 76.2k viewers on 23 January 2021 being the second most watched Indian television series. The viewership further increased to 80.6k on 26 January 2021, occupying third position. Maintaining the same position, the series had a viewership of 82.8k on 26 February 2021. On the week ending 7 March 2021, it maintained its third position with 103.2k viewership.

== Soundtrack ==
Shaurya Aur Anokhi Ki Kahani Original Soundtrack

Soundtrack album by Kingshuk Chakravarty
- Released: 21 December 2020
- Genres: Romance; Soundtrack
- Length: 4:39
- Language: Hindi
- Label: Star India
- Producers: Tony Singh; Deeya Singh

Shaurya Aur Anokhi Ki Kahani: Tracklisting
No.	Title	Length
1.	"Anokhi Teri Jugni"	2:15
2.	"Jo Tera Howega"	2:24
Total length:		4:39

== Adaptations ==
Language	Title	Original release	Network(s)	Last aired	Notes
Bengali	Mohor মোহর	28 October 2019	Star Jalsha	3 April 2022	Original
Kannada	Sarasu ಸರಸು	11 November 2020	Star Suvarna	28 August 2021	Remake
Telugu	Guppedantha Manasu గుప్పెడంత మనసు	7 December 2020	Star Maa	31 August 2024	Remake
Hindi	Shaurya Aur Anokhi Ki Kahani शौर्य और अनोखी की कहानी	21 December 2020	StarPlus	24 July 2021	Remake
Malayalam	Koodevide കൂടെവിടെ	4 January 2021	Asianet	22 July 2023	Remake
Tamil	Kaatrukkenna Veli காற்றுக்கென்ன வேலி	18 January 2021	Star Vijay	30 September 2023	Remake
Marathi	Swabhiman – Shodh Astitvacha स्वाभिमान – शोध अस्तित्वाचा	22 February 2021	Star Pravah	6 May 2023	Remake
