= Kaatrukkenna Veli (TV series) =

2021 Indian television series

- Genre: Drama
- Developed by: Leena Gangopadhyay
- Written by: Dialogues: Sangeetha Mohan; D.J. Dhanajayan
- Directed by: Francis Kathiravan (episodes 1–15); Chandrashekar V (episodes 16–235); Harish Adithya (episodes 236–644); P. Niravi Pandiyan (episodes 645–809)
- Creative director: Ramesh D. Aravind
- Starring: Priyanka Kumar; Swaminathan Anantharaman; Darshan K. Raju
- Theme music composer: Kiran
- Country of origin: India
- Original language: Tamil
- No. of seasons: 1
- No. of episodes: 809

Production
- Editor: P.Arunkumar
- Camera setup: Multi-Camera
- Running time: 22 minutes
- Production companies: Endemol Shine India (2021–2023); Box Office Studio & Sumukha Entertainment (2023)

Original release
- Network: Star Vijay
- Release: 18 January 2021 – 30 September 2023

Related
- Mohor

Kaatrukkena Veli (transl. What's the Need of a Fence for Air?) is a 2021 Indian-Tamil language drama starring Priyanka Kumar with Swaminathan Anantharaman and Darshan K. Raju. It is an official remake of Star Jalsha serial Mohor. It premiered on 18 January 2021, and aired on Star Vijay and is also available on the digital platform Disney+ Hotstar before its telecast. The series final episode was aired 30 September 2023 and ended with 809 episodes.

== Cast ==
=== Main ===
- Priyanka Kumar as Vennila Surya – Varadharajan and Vasuki's younger daughter; Sowmya and Vishnu's sister; Surya's student turned wife. (2021–2023)
- Darshan K. Raju / Swaminathan Anantharaman as Surya Mahadevan – Sharadha and Mahadevan's son; Meenakshi and Shivanantham's nephew/foster son; Abhi and Anandhi's cousin; Madhuvarshini's ex-fiancé; Vennila's economic professor turned husband (2021) / (2021–2023)
- Malavika Avinash / Jyothi Rai / Harsha Nair as Sharadha Mahadevan – Mahadevan's wife; Surya's mother; Vennila's mentor. (2021) / (2021–2023) / (2023)

=== Supporting ===
- Veena Venkatesh / Sujatha Panju as Meenakshi Shivanantham – Shivanantham's wife; Surya's aunt/foster mother. (2021; 2023) / (2021–2023) (Main Antagonist)
- Tarun Master as Shivanantham – Mahadevan and Vishwanathan's brother; Meenakshi's husband; Surya's uncle/foster father.
- Bhanu Prakash as Mahadevan – Shivanantham and Vishwanathan's brother; Sharadha's husband; Surya's father.
- Akshitha Ashok as Abhinaya "Abhi" Vishwanathan – Bhanumathi and Vishwanathan's elder daughter; Anandhi's twin sister; Surya's cousin (Antagonist)
- Preetha Reddy as Anandhi Vishwanathan – Bhanumathi and Vishwanathan's younger daughter; Abhi's twin sister; Surya's cousin.
- Aarthi Ramkumar as Bhanumathi Vishwanathan – Vishwanathan's wife; Abhi and Anandhi's mother.
- Raj Khanna as Vishwanathan – Shivanantham and Mahadevan's brother; Bhanumathi's husband; Abhi and Anandhi's father. (Antagonist)
- Sridevi Ashok as Shyamala – Meenakshi and Shivanantham's daughter-in-law.
- Vetrivel as Inspector Anbucheziyan - Vennila's ex-fiance. (Antagonist)
- Reshmaa as Sowmya Madhavan – Varadharajan and Vasuki's elder daughter; Vishnu and Vennila's sister; Madhavan's wife. (Dead)
- Maanas Chavali as Madhavan – Maragathavalli's son; Sowmya's abusive husband and murderer. (Antagonist)
- Padmini as Vasuki Varatharajan – Varatharajan's wife; Sowmya, Vishnu and Vennila's mother.
- Nalinikanth as Varatharajan – Vasuki's husband; Sowmya, Vishnu and Vennila's father.
- P. R. Varalakshmi as Varatharajan's mother; Sowmya, Vishnu and Venneila's grandmother.
- Shammi as Maragathavalli – Madhavan's mother.
- Shyam Sundar as Madhavan's father.
- Dayana as Roopa – Vennila's college friend
- Raghavendran Puli / Chandru as Maaran – Vennila's college friend.
- Harishankar Narayanan as Seenu – Surya's best friend
- Gana Hari as Tamizh – Vennila's college friend
- Dhilip Kumar as Akash – Vennila's college friend

=== Cameo appearances ===
- Janani Ashok Kumar as Madhuvarshini – Surya's ex-fiancé (2021)
- Ashwini Aanandita as Shivani – Surya's colleague and one-sided lover (2023)
- Vinoth Babu as Vetri - a well known rowdy who intervenes to save Vennila from Inspector Anbu (2023)

== Production ==
=== Development ===
At the end of 2020, Star Vijay planned an official Tamil remake of Star Jalsha's Bengali language series Mohor to be produced by Endemol Shine India.

=== Casting ===
Actors Darshan K. Raju and Priyanka Kumar were initially cast to fill the roles of the lead characters Surya Mahadevan and Vennila; however, Raju left the show in October 2021 and was replaced by Swaminathan Anantharaman. The role of Surya's mother was initially given to Malavika Avinash, who left in September 2021 and was replaced first by Jyothi Rai, then by Harsha Nair.

Veena Venkatesh was cast Meenakshi Shivanantham (Surya's aunt and foster mother), but tested positive for Covid-19 and was unable to complete filming. Sridevi Ashok was cast as Shyamala.

== Adaptations ==
Language	Title	Original release	Network(s)	Last aired	Notes
Bengali	Mohor মোহর	28 October 2019	Star Jalsha	3 April 2022	Original
Kannada	Sarasu ಸರಸು	11 November 2020	Star Suvarna	28 August 2021	Remake
Telugu	Guppedantha Manasu గుప్పెడంత మనసు	7 December 2020	Star Maa	31 August 2024	Remake
Hindi	Shaurya Aur Anokhi Ki Kahani शौर्य और अनोखी की कहानी	21 December 2020	StarPlus	24 July 2021	Remake
Malayalam	Koodevide കൂടെവിടെ	4 January 2021	Asianet	22 July 2023	Remake
Tamil	Kaatrukkenna Veli காற்றுக்கென்ன வேலி	18 January 2021	Star Vijay	30 September 2023	Remake
Marathi	Swabhiman – Shodh Astitvacha स्वाभिमान – शोध अस्तित्वाचा	22 February 2021	Star Pravah	6 May 2023	Remake
