= Chahool =

Indian television drama

- Genre: Horror; Thriller
- Starring: See below
- Country of origin: India
- Original language: Marathi
- No. of episodes: 282

Production
- Producers: Aarav Jindal; Vinod Manikrao
- Camera setup: Multi-camera
- Running time: 22 minutes
- Production company: Euphoria Productions

Original release
- Network: Colors Marathi
- Release: 12 December 2016 – 10 November 2017

Related
- Chahool 2

Chahool (transl. Chirm) is an Indian Marathi language television series aired on Colors Marathi. It is produced by Aarav Jindal and Vinod Manikrao under the banner of Euphoria Productions. The show premiered on 12 December 2016 and ended on 10 November 2017.

== Plot ==
It is the story of Nirmala who has been in love with Sarjerao since her childhood. When she realises that Sarjerao, who is all set to marry a foreigner, never loved her in return, a devastated Nirmala dies of heartbreak. But true love knows no boundaries, not even that of life and death! Thirsting for vengeance, Nirmala returns to torment Sarjerao's love interest, Jenny.

== Cast ==
- Akshar Kothari as Sarjerao
- Reshma Shinde as Shambhavi
- Shashwati Pimplikar as Nirmala
- Leysan Karimova as Jenny
- Madhav Abhyankar as Sarjerao's father
- Uma Gokhale as Sarjerao's mother
- Anil Gavas
- Vishal Kulthe
- Surekha Kudachi
- Radha Kulkarni
- Rajendra Shisatkar
- Vijay Mishra
- Shilpa Wakade
