= Parinati (2025 film) =

Indian drama film

- Directed by: Akshay Balsaraf
- Written by: Akshay Balsaraf
- Produced by: Paragg Mehta; Harsh Narula
- Starring: Amruta Subhash; Sonalee Kulkarni
- Cinematography: Himanshu Dubey
- Edited by: Rajesh Rao
- Music by: Praful Swapnil; Samir Saptiskar; Vipin Agraval
- Production companies: PH Films; Phoenix Films; Insync Motion Pictures
- Release date: 1 August 2025
- Running time: 122 minutes
- Country: India
- Language: Marathi

Parinati, also known as Parinati: Badal Swatasathi (transl. Chang for Oneself) is a 2025 Indian Marathi-language drama film written and directed by Akshay Balsaraf. The film stars Amruta Subhash and Sonalee Kulkarni in the lead roles. It follows the journey of two strong women from different backgrounds and explores their evolving friendship.

== Plot ==
The film follows the story of Dr. Saili, a well-respected doctor and mother who leads what appears to be a happy life with her husband and son. Her world shatters when she discovers her husband's infidelity. Devastated by the betrayal, Dr. Saili spirals into alcoholism as a coping mechanism for her emotional pain.

At the lowest point in her life, Dr. Saili encounters Jharna, a vibrant and fearless bar dancer. Jharna's compassion and positive outlook become instrumental in helping Dr. Saili navigate her crisis. Set against the backdrop of the Navratri season, the film chronicles the unlikely but deeply rooted friendship that develops between these two women from vastly different social backgrounds. Their bond becomes a transformative force, enabling both of them to discover their inner strength and rebuild their lives after facing profound emotional turmoil.

== Cast ==
- Amruta Subhash as Dr. Saili
- Sonalee Kulkarni as Jharna
- Akshar Kothari as Nikhil
- Chinmayee Swami

== Production ==
The film marked the Marathi cinema debut of television actor Akshar Kothari. It also brought together Amruta Subhash and Sonalee Kulkarni in a collaboration for the film.

== Music ==
The film's background score was composed by Praful Swapnil.

Track listing
No.	Title	Lyrics	Music	Singer(s)	Length
1.	"Rani"	Samir Saptiskar	Samir Saptiskar	Vaishali Made, Prajakta Shukre	5:00
2.	"Maitri"	Sujay Jadhav	Vipin Agraval	Vaishali Made	4:46
3.	"Aag"	Manndar Cholkar	Praful Swapnil	Ronkini Gupta	3:14
4.	"Swapna"	Manndar Cholkar	Praful Swapnil	Aanandi Joshi	4:20
Total length:					17:20

== Release and reception ==
The first song, “Rani”, featuring the two lead characters, was released in July 2025 and highlighted the theme of friendship between two strong and self-reliant women. The film was theatrically released on 1 August 2025.

A reviewer from Film Information felt that despite strong performances, particularly by Amruta Subhash, the film's mismatched execution and weak emotional impact resulted in limited audience appeal.
