= Guppedantha Manasu =

Indian Telugu Television Drama series

- Genre: Drama; Family; Romance
- Based on: Mohor
- Developed by: Leena Gangopadhyay
- Written by: Dialogues: Aadi Ganesh; Ravi Surugula
- Story by: K Usha Rani
- Directed by: Kapuganti Rajendra (Episode 1-100); Anil Anand; Kumar Pantham
- Starring: Mukesh Gowda; Raksha Gowda; Sai Kiran; Jyothi Rai
- Country of origin: India
- No. of seasons: 1
- No. of episodes: 1168

Production
- Producers: Rajiv Bhakshi; Simni Karna; Anil Anand
- Cinematography: Lakshmi Srinivas
- Editor: Suresh K Kasukurthi
- Running time: 21-23 mins
- Production companies: BIG Synergy; Bhoomi Entertainments

Original release
- Network: Star Maa
- Release: 7 December 2020 – 31 August 2024

Related
- Mohor

Guppedantha Manasu (transl. Fist-Sized Heart) is an Indian Telugu-language romantic drama television series which aired on Star Maa from 7 December 2020 till 31 August 2024, at 7 p.m. IST from Monday to Saturday. It is also available on Disney+ Hotstar. The main plot of the serial was taken from Bengali language series Mohor, which aired on Star Jalsha. It stars Mukesh Gowda, Raksha Gowda, Sai Kiran and Jyothi Rai in lead roles. The story showcases the ups and downs in the life of a brilliant and fiery-tempered professor of a college professor, when he clashes with his talented yet headstrong student.

== Plot ==
Rishendra 'Rishi' Bhushan is the young, brilliant and dynamic managing director (MD) and mathematics professor at a college in Hyderabad, Devendra Bhushan Institute of Science and Technology (DBST), which is owned by his family. He is rich, arrogant, hot-tempered, and is hostile towards his mother, Jagathi, due to a misunderstanding that she left him in his childhood because she didn't want him in her life and chose her career over him. Jagathi had left five-year old Rishi to care for her ailing parents. But his envious aunt Devyani did not let Jagathi come back home to Rishi, and poisoned young Rishi's mind against her. Rishi is raised by Devyani and his father, Mahindra, both of whom he loves and respects tremendously. An extremely talented and intelligent student, Rishi becomes a university gold medalist, and starts managing the DBST college. Rishi agrees for an arranged marriage with a friend, Sakshi, but breaks his engagement with her because Sakshi wants to do a PhD abroad first. Rishi and Jagathi are separated for twenty years, during which she did not try to meet or contact Rishi. While Jagathi remains miserable and profusely misses Rishi, he is both pained and enraged at her for leaving him.

Rishi's paths cross with Vasudhara 'Vasu', a headstrong and brilliant student from a village who dreams to become a teacher. Vasu escapes from a forced wedding to Rajiv, her elder sister's evil widower, who convinces Vasu's orthodox father Chakrapani 'Chakram' to let Rajiv marry her for the sake of his motherless child. Jagathi, who is Vasu's former teacher in her village, advises her to run away from home and study at her son Rishi's college, DBST. When Rishi learns that Jagathi sent Vasu, he deliberately sets a very difficult admission interview for her, which she passes painstakingly with Mahindra and Jagathi's help. Rishi admits Vasu to DBST and is now her mathematics professor.

Rishi and Vasu's ideologies initially clash at various instances. Vasu doesn't understand Rishi's animosity towards Jagathi, and he slaps her for insulting his character. But Vasu slowly earns Rishi's acceptance, support and favour with her hard work and sincerity. Rishi accompanies Vasu to the 'Youth Icon' contest and motivates her to win. Rishi also saves her multiple times from the lustful conspiracies of Rajiv, who is later jailed by SI Sireesh, Vasu's childhood friend. Jagathi proposes a project called 'Mission Education', which Rishi reluctantly agrees to lead at DBST, and eventually acquires Government support for it. Rishi reluctantly employs Jagathi as a professor at DBST, but ensures that no one knows she is his mother. Rishi recruits Vasudhara as his project assistant, and they all work together to make Mission Education a grand success. Mahindra, Vasu and Jagathi try hard to convince Rishi to forgive and reunite with Jagathi, but Rishi does not accept.

As Rishi and Vasu spend time together, they start developing feelings for each other. Vasu hallucinates Rishi's presence everywhere and longs for his support, while Rishi grows possessive of her and dislikes her spending time with her friend Sireesh. To make Rishi reveal his feelings for Vasu, Mahindra misleads Rishi into thinking that she is about to marry Sireesh. But instead, Rishi grows furious at Vasu for hiding things from him, avoids her, and fires her from the post of his assistant. A hurt Vasu tries hard to ask an unyielding Rishi what her mistake is and why he is angry with her. Finally, desperate, she stands for hours in the rain before Rishi relents and confronts her about marrying Sireesh. Vasu emotionally reveals that she isn't engaged to Sireesh, and begs Rishi to scold her all he wants, but not punish her by being distant or ignoring her. Rishi becomes friendly with Vasu again.

Rishi's friend Gautam comes from USA to stay with him, and to Rishi's annoyance, harbours feelings for Vasu. Against Devyani's wishes, Rishi reluctantly brings Jagathi to his house for the first time in 22 years to celebrate Makar Sankranti, for Mahindra's happiness after he suffers a heart stroke. To stop Devyani from tarnishing Jagathi's reputation, Mahendra publicly reveals that Jagathi is Rishi's mother and his wife. Rishi's anger at this causes Jagathi and Mahindra to move out of Rishi's house. Jagathi informs Rishi that Mahindra's health is suffering as he misses Rishi. To Devyani's horror, Rishi brings both Jagathi and Mahindra back home to live together after 22 years, as a birthday gift for Mahindra. Vasu continually admires and appreciates Rishi's stellar character. Her concern for Rishi and eagerness to make him happy attract him to her. A proud Jagathi is constantly appreciated for Rishi's professional and personal virtues. Vasu rejects Gautam's proposal, citing that she interacts with him only because he is Rishi's friend. Sakshi returns, pausing her PhD to win Rishi back with Devyani's help, but is rejected vehemently by a furious Rishi. Sakshi insults Vasu for being close to Rishi, and warns her to stay away from him.

After deep thought, Rishi realizes and confesses his love for Vasu. But influenced by Sakshi, Vasu tells a stunned Rishi that she does not love him and does not believe his love for her, because he rejected both Jagathi and Sakshi in the past. Rishi resolves to stay away from Vasu, while she hallucinates him everywhere and can't concentrate in class or her part-time job. She makes several unsuccessful attempts to talk and apologize to Rishi, prays profusely for him when he meets with a road accident, plans a grand welcome for him in college when he recovers, gives him all her food despite being hungry, and realizes that she would die without Rishi when he risks his life to save his students and vasu save rishi from a fire in the chemistry lab publicly credits Rishi for her academic success and garlands him with flowers, feels jealous seeing him with Sakshi and vows to win him back, but is afraid to propose lest Rishi slap her and reject her in anger. Vasu constantly tries to appease Rishi's anger, while he scolds her for losing focus on her studies. When Sakshi publicly proposes marriage to a furious Rishi in college, Devyani begs him to marry her for their family's reputation. But Rishi forces Sakshi to call off their wedding with his deliberate negligence and open interest in Vasu. Vasu apologizes to Rishi and emotionally confesses her love to him, with a ring with their initials 'R' and 'V'. Rishi gracefully accepts her proposal on the condition that in his love, she won't neglect her education and career. Sakshi plots to prevent Vasu from writing her final examinations, but Rishi foils her plan. His threat to get her arrested causes Sakshi to flee. Vasu ranks first in the University and dedicates her success to Rishi and Jagathi.

Rishi slowly develops a positive impression on Jagathi as he observes her good behavior, good understanding of him and the similarity in their thoughts. Rishi grandly celebrates his parents' wedding anniversary for Mahindra's happiness. Mahindra and Vasu clash with an irritated Rishi in a bid to convince him to accept Jagathi as his mother. Triggered by Devyani, Mahindra and Jagathi leave Rishi's house for his happiness, but Rishi brings them back. Mahindra and Vasu apologize to Rishi for hurting him with their stubbornness. When Jagathi meets with a road accident, Rishi saves her life by donating blood to her and takes great care of her. Rishi employs Vasu at DBST to work for the Mission Education efforts. Devyani cunningly misrepresents Rishi's closeness with Vasu and maligns her publicly. But Rishi protects Vasu by declaring her as his fianceè. Rishi takes Vasu to her parents' house to fix their marriage, where Rajeev blackmails a terrified Vasu that he will kill Rishi if she does not marry him. Unknown to Rishi, a desperate Vasu wears a mangalasutra (nuptial chain) in his name and declares herself as Rishi's wife to her family, to save herself from marrying Rajeev. An angry Rajeev assaults Vasu's parents, who are saved by Rishi. Rajeev gets Vasu arrested under false charges of attempting to murder her parents so that she can marry Rishi. Fearing that Rajeev will harm Rishi, but rishi doesn't understand her and leave her in the prison. Devayani gave bail to vasu. Vasu's parents recover and close the case against her by testifying against Rajeev. Vasu returns to DBST college to win back Rishi's love and trust.

Rishi and his family are furious at Vasu without knowing the truth. Vasu tries to explain her situation but she never allows her and he is not ready to listen her view... vasu tries to call, text, and to meet him several times a day, happily takes the flowers that Rishi offers God at a temple, gives Rishi a head massage, prays for him to accept her back but rishi cannot understand her love. Hurting her with his harsh behaviour. Rishi ignores Vasu thinking that she married Rajeev, Seeing her nuptial chain, an uncomfortable Vasu is repeatedly asked who her husband is in college, but she remains silent fearing Rishi's wrath if she reveals that imagined her marriage with him. Rishi realize that there is no one in her life except him. Rishi lashes out at a scared Vasu for taking major decisions about their lives without telling him, public humiliation by Devyani, Rishi declares Vasu as his wife in front of the media, but firmly warns her in private that she simply wearing a mangalasutra in his name without his knowledge does not make her his wife. Vasu clears heart is more important than traditions rishi eventually understand her love and Brveness accepts Vasu in his life again. Rishi and Vasu get engaged in a grand ceremony.

Rishi's professional rivals try to besmirch his college's reputation, but he foils their plans. Rishi aspires to advance DBST college to new heights by offering medical degree courses. Rishi's cousin brother, Shailendra, returns home from USA. Jealous of Rishi's fame, career and achievements; Shailendra threatens a terrified Jagathi that he will kill Rishi and become the MD of DBST college. To save Rishi from Shailendra and send him away from the college, in front of the college board and education minister, Jagathi and Vasu falsely accuse a stunned Rishi of stealing college funds for his personal use. Furious and anguished at this character assassination, Rishi resigns and appoints Jagathi as the college MD. Jagathi and Vasu beg Rishi to forgive their betrayal. But Rishi can't understand their intentions and blindly misunderstood as usual as before. breaks his engagement with harsh words and behaviour. Poor Vasu leaves the city. Vasu also leaves, unable to stay in the city without Rishi. Vasu's mother dies of a heart attack after learning that Rishi has ended his relationship with Vasu. Fearing that Mahindra will bring Rishi back, Shailendra hires goons who stab Rishi. He is admitted to the hospital in a critical condition.

Three Years Later

Mahindra, Jagathi and Vasu are pained, lonely and miserable, living distant from each other and desperately hoping to find Rishi. Rishi's childhood friend, Angel, donates blood to him and saves his life. Angel's grandfather Vishwanandham, who chairs a college named "Vish college", requests Rishi to work there to control a group of delinquent students. For the first time in three years, Rishi runs into Vasu, who joins Vish college as a lecturer. Rishi is still cold towards a remorseful Vasu for betraying him three years ago, and rejects all attempts made by her and Chakram to gain his forgiveness. But Rishi stops Vasu when she tries to leave the city fearing his anger, and cares for her when she meets with an accident. Rishi reforms the unruly students by teaching them the importance of education and discipline, and improves Vish college's reputation via successful educational schemes. Mahindra and Jagathi are ecstatic to discover Rishi's whereabouts through Chakram, and try to spend time with him by creating collaborations between Vish college and DBST. Shailendra is horrified to learn that Rishi is alive and plans multiple, unsuccessful attacks on him. Vasu has a mental breakdown when Angel reveals that she loves Rishi. However, Rishi firmly rejects Angel's marriage proposal. Shailendra colludes with Rishi's professional rivals to take over DBST college, but Rishi foils his plans. An angry Shailendra tries to get Rishi shot, but Jagathi takes the bullet for him. Finally recognizing her love for him, Rishi accepts an overjoyed Jagathi as his mother and returns home with her. Honouring an emotional Jagathi's last wish, Rishi marries Vasu. Shailendra poisons Jagathi's food, and she passes away after witnessing her son's wedding, shattering Rishi and Mahindra.

Rishi is furious at Devyani for insulting a grieving Mahindra because he was drinking to cope with Jagathi's death, and leaves his house with Mahindra and Vasu. Hoping that a change of scenery will help Mahindra recover, Rishi takes him and Vasu to Araku, where they run into Mahindra and Jagathi's friend, Anupama, who also turns out to be Angel's aunt. Angel and Vishwanandham are unhappy at having lost Rishi. Vasu tries to reveal Shailendra's misdeeds to Rishi, but is terrified of his reaction. Shailendra tries to falsely accuse Vasu of murdering Jagathi, but Rishi saves her. Mahindra promises to give up alcohol for Rishi's happiness.

== Cast ==
=== Main cast ===
- Mukesh Gowda as Rishendra Bhushan a.k.a Rishi: Managing Director and Mathematics Professor at DBST college; Jagathi and Mahendra's son; Phanindra and Devyani's nephew and foster son; Vasu's professor, mentor, employer, love interest, and husband; Ravindra and Suhasini's nephew; Shailendra, Anju and Sanju's cousin; Gautam's and Angel's best friend; Dharani's brother-in-law.
- Raksha Gowda as Vasudhara Rishendra Bhushan a.k.a Vasu: student, youth icon, University topper, mission education Head, vish collage lecturer, Dbst collage MD, mentee, love interest, and rishi's wife, Jagathi's student and daughter-in-law; Chakrapani and Sumitra's youngest daughter; Vandana and Madhavi's younger sister.
- Sai Kiran as Mahendra Bhushan: Rishi's father; Board member at DBST college; Jagathi's widower; Vasudhara's father-in-law; Anupama's best-friend; Phanindra and Ravindra's brother; Shailendra, Anju and Sanju's uncle.
- Jyothi Rai as Jagathi Mahendra Bhushan: Rishi's mother; Mathematics professor at DBST college; Vasu's former professor and Mother-in-law; Mahendra's late wife; Shailendra, Anju and Sanju's aunt. (Dead)
- Madhavi Vootla (2020-2023) / Sangeetha Kondaveti (2023–present) as Devayani Phanindra Bhushan: Rishi's aunt and foster mother; Matriarch of the Bhushan family; Phanindra's wife; Mahindra and Ravindra's sister-in-law; Shailendra's mother; Dharani's mother-in-law.

=== Recurring cast ===
- Nava Bharath Balaji as Phanindra Bhushan: Rishi, Anju and Sanju's uncle; Patriarch of the Bhushan family; Devyani's husband; Mahendra and Ravindra's elder brother; Shailendra's father; Dharani's father-in-law
- Jyothi Poornima (2020-2022)/Seetha Mahalakshmi (2022–present) as Dharani Shailendra Bhushan: Rishi's sister-in-law; Shailendra's wife; Devayani and Phanindra's daughter-in-law
- Kiran Kanth as Gautham: Rishi's best friend
- Chandra Lakshman as Anupama: Mahindra & Jagathi's mutual friend
- Vasanthi (2020-2021)/Rasagnya Ritu (2022-present) as Sakshi: Rishi's former fiancée (Antagonist)
- Gopal Shyam as Rajiv: Vasu and Madhavi's brother-in-law; Vandhana's widower; Vishalakshi's son (Antagonist)
- Srinidhi as Pushpa: Rishi's student at DBST college; Vasu's classmate and best friend
- Suresh Babu as Shailendra Bhushan: Rishi's cousin brother; Phanindra and Devyani's son; Dharani's husband; Jagathi's murderer (Antagonist)
- Sudheer Challa as Ravindra Bhushan: Rishi and Shailendra's uncle; Suhasini's husband; Sanju and Anju's father; Mahendra and Phanindra's younger brother
- Vanitha as Suhasini Ravindra Bhushan: Rishi and Shailendra's aunt; Ravindra's wife; Sanju and Anju's mother
- Veena Swaroopa as Anjana "Anju" Bhushan: Rishi and Shailendra's cousin; Sanju's twin sister; Ravindra and Suhasini's daughter
- VJ Roshini as Sanjana "Sanju" Bhushan: Rishi and Shailendra's cousin: Anju's twin sister; Ravindra and Suhasini's daughter
- Avantika as Angel: Rishi's childhood friend
- Sudheer Chandra as Pandian: Rishi's student at Vish college
- Radha Krishna as Murugan: Rishi's well-wisher; Pandian's father
- Aparna as Madhavi: Vasu and Vandhana's sister; Chakrapani and Sumitra's daughter; Vikas's wife
- Adarsh as SI Sireesh: Vasu's friend
- Balaji as Chakrapani "Chakram": Vasu, Madhavi and Vandhana's father; Sumitra's widower
- Ushashri as Sumitra (2020-2023): Vasu, Madhavi and Vandhana's late mother; Chakrapani's late wife
- Uma Shankar as Vikas: Madhavi's husband; Vasu's brother-in-law
- Uma Naidu as Vasu, Madhavi and Vandhana's aunt; Chakrapani's elder sister
- Gayathri Alluri as Vishalakshi: Rajiv's mother
- Indira Anand as Anupama's mother
- Bhargavi as Vandhana: Vasu and Madhavi's late elder sister; Rajiv's late wife; Chakrapani and Sumitra's late daughter (Posthumous presence in photographs)

== Adaptations ==
| Language | Title | Original release | Network(s) | Last aired | Notes |
|---|---|---|---|---|---|
| Bengali | Mohor মোহর | 28 October 2019 | Star Jalsha | 3 April 2022 | Original |
| Kannada | Sarasu ಸರಸು | 11 November 2020 | Star Suvarna | 28 August 2021 | Remake |
| Telugu | Guppedantha Manasu గుప్పెడంత మనసు | 7 December 2020 | Star Maa | 31 August 2024 | Remake |
| Hindi | Shaurya Aur Anokhi Ki Kahani शौर्य और अनोखी की कहानी | 21 December 2020 | StarPlus | 24 July 2021 | Remake |
| Malayalam | Koodevide കൂടെവിടെ | 4 January 2021 | Asianet | 22 July 2023 | Remake |
| Tamil | Kaatrukkenna Veli காற்றுக்கென்ன வேலி | 18 January 2021 | Star Vijay | 30 September 2023 | Remake |
| Marathi | Swabhiman – Shodh Astitvacha स्वाभिमान – शोध अस्तित्वाचा | 22 February 2021 | Star Pravah | 6 May 2023 | Remake |

== Reception ==
In September 2022, Guppedantha Manasu became the top GEC show in Telugu television in both Urban and Rural ratings, breaking the 221-week long first place record of the Star Maa serial, Karthika Deepam. Guppedantha Manasu has also enjoyed the position of the most popular Telugu show, as well as the top viewed show across the whole of India, online on Disney+Hotstar beginning from 2021. Guppedantha Manasu was the seventh most watched show on TV in the whole of India across all languages, in 2022.

In June 2022, Guppedantha Manasu became the top show in terms of Urban ratings and the top 2 GEC show overall for the Telugu audience, and has remained so ever since. In February 2022, the show became a top 3 show in both Telugu GEC and Star Maa. In November 2021 and December 2021, the show received its highest ever ratings of 14+ TRP points.
