= Mohor (TV series) =

Indian Bengali television series

- Genre: Drama; Romance
- Created by: Magic Moments Motion Pictures
- Screenplay by: Leena Gangopadhyay
- Story by: Leena Gangopadhyay
- Directed by: Saibal Banerjee; Partha Dey
- Creative director: Leena Gangopadhyay
- Starring: Sonamoni Saha; Pratik Sen
- Opening theme: "Notun Aloy Ke Dake Mohor"
- Composer: Debajyoti Mishra
- Country of origin: India
- Original language: Bengali
- No. of episodes: 783+2 special lockdown episodes

Production
- Executive producers: Debolina Mukhopadhyay & Sumit Roy (Magic Moments Motion Pictures); Taniya & Nilanjan (Star Jalsha)
- Producer: Saibal Banerjee
- Cinematography: Sanjoy Ghosh
- Editors: Samir & Soumen
- Running time: 22 minutes
- Production company: Magic Moments Motion Pictures

Original release
- Network: Star Jalsha
- Release: 28 October 2019 – 3 April 2022

Mohor is an Indian Bengali Romantic drama television series that premiered on 28 October 2019 on Star Jalsha. Produced by Leena Gangopadhyay and Saibal Banerjee under the banner of Magic Moments Motion Pictures, it stars Sonamoni Saha and Pratik Sen.

== Plot ==
Mohor is an undergraduate student who aspires to be an educationist. When her father forces her to get married, she runs away from her arranged marriage and comes to a big city to study. Her life changes completely after she meets Shankhodip Roy Chowdhury (Sankho), her professor at the college who is also her teacher and mentor's son. The trials and tribulations the couple go through forms the rest of the plot.

== Cast ==
=== Main ===
- Sonamoni Saha as Mohor Basu Roy Chowdhury aka Maharani – Sameer and Basumati's younger daughter; Titir and Piklu's sister; Sankho's student turned wife
- Pratik Sen as Sankhodip "Sankho" Roy Chowdhury aka Maharaj – Adi and Aditi's son; Subhradip, Diya and Mayuri's cousin; Shrestha's ex-fiańcee and former love interest; Mohor's professor turned husband

=== Recurring ===
- Sabitri Chatterjee as Saraswati Basu – Sameer's mother; Titir, Piklu and Mohor's grandmother
- Sumanta Mukherjee as Sameer Basu – Saraswati's son; Basumati's husband; Titir, Piklu and Mohor's father
- Rita Dutta Chakraborty as Basumati Basu – Sameer's wife; Titir, Piklu and Mohor's mother
- Lovely Maitra as Titir Basu Roy Chowdhury – A Sarod specialist; Sameer and Basumati's elder daughter; Piklu and Mohor's sister; Gourab's ex-wife; Ishaan's wife
- Indrajit Chakraborty as Ishaan Roy Chowdhury – A Sarod specialist; Titir's love interest turned second husband
- Sujoy Saha as Pratik "Piklu" Basu – Sameer and Basumati's son; Titir and Mohor's brother
- Santu Mukherjee / Dulal Lahiri as Anantadeb Roy Chowdhury – Adi and Ayoundeb's brother; Malobika's husband; Subhra's father
- Anusuya Majumdar / Moumita Gupta as Malobika Roy Chowdhury – Anantadeb's wife; Subhra's mother
- Abhishek Chatterjee as Adideb "Adi" Roy Chowdhury – Anantdeb and Ayondeb's brother; Aditi's husband; Sankho's father (Dead)
- Anushree Das as Dr. Aditi Roy Chowdhury – Mohor's college professor; Adi's widow; Sankho's mother
- Sourav Chakraborty as Ayondeb Roy Chowdhury – A shrewd and corrupt college director; Anantdeb and Adi's brother; Joyeeta's husband; Diya and Mayuri's father
- Jayashree Mukherjee Kaul as Joyeeta Roy Chowdhury – Ayondeb's wife; Diya and Mayuri's mother
- Subhrajit Dutta as Subhradip "Subhra" Roy Chowdhury – Anantadeb and Malobika's son; Sankho, Diya and Mayuri's cousin; Shramana's estranged husband
- Rajanya Mitra as Shramana Roy Chowdhury – Subhra's estranged wife
- Ipshita Mukherjee / Priyanka Mitra as Diya Roy Chowdhury – Ayondeb and Joyeeta's elder daughter; Mayuri's sister; Subhra and Sankho's cousin
- Nishantika Das as Mayuri Roy Chowdhury – Ayondeb and Joyeeta's younger daughter; Diya's sister; Subhra and Sankho's cousin
- Madhurima Basak as Shrestha Ghosh Dasgupta – Sankho's former love interest and colleague; Ahir's wife
- Tathagata Mukherjee as ACP Ahir Dasgupta – A police commissioner; Mohor and Sankho's well wisher; Shrestha's husband
- Debottam Majumdar as Gourab Ghosh – Pramila and Mithilesh's son; Titir's first husband
- Tramila Bhattacharya / Rupali Rai Bhattacharya as Pramila Ghosh – Mithilesh's wife; Gourab's mother
- Diganta Bagchi as Mithilesh Ghosh – Pramila's husband; Gourab's father
- Shyamal Dutta as Shrestha's father
- Prasun Bandyopadhyay as police officer
- Saswati Majumder as Saswati Ghosh – Mohor's best friend
- Bhaswar Chatterjee as Rahul Chatterjee – Shrestha's batchmate and friend; Mohor and Sankho's rival
- Debdut Ghosh as Guruji – Ishaan and Titir's music teacher
- Ankita Chakraborty as Kamalini – A lawyer
- Ujani Dasgupta
- Srijani Mitra as Anulekha Mitra – Sankho's distant cousin
- Sairity Banerjee as Arundhuti – A nun; Sankho's caretaker in the group of monks
- Suman Banerjee
- Ashok Bhattacharya
- Chitra Sen

== Adaptations ==
Language	Title	Original release	Network(s)	Last aired	Notes
Bengali	Mohor মোহর	28 October 2019	Star Jalsha	3 April 2022	Original
Kannada	Sarasu ಸರಸು	11 November 2020	Star Suvarna	28 August 2021	Remake
Telugu	Guppedantha Manasu గుప్పెడంత మనసు	7 December 2020	Star Maa	31 August 2024	Remake
Hindi	Shaurya Aur Anokhi Ki Kahani शौर्य और अनोखी की कहानी	21 December 2020	StarPlus	24 July 2021	Remake
Malayalam	Koodevide കൂടെവിടെ	4 January 2021	Asianet	22 July 2023	Remake
Tamil	Kaatrukkenna Veli காற்றுக்கென்ன வேலி	18 January 2021	Star Vijay	30 September 2023	Remake
Marathi	Swabhiman – Shodh Astitvacha स्वाभिमान – शोध अस्तित्वाचा	22 February 2021	Star Pravah	6 May 2023	Remake
Hindi	Ghum Hai Kisikey Pyaar Meiin - Season 2	28 June 2023	StarPlus	19 June 2024	Remake

== Reception ==
Week	Year	BARC Viewership		Ref.
Week	Year	TRP	Rank	Ref.
Week 37	2020	6.8	1	
Week 38	2020	6.3	2	
Week 39	2020	6.5	1	
Week 40	2020	6.7	1	
Week 42	2020	5.6	1	
Week 43	2020	5.4	1	
Week 44	2020	6.2	1	
Week 45	2020	6.2	1	
Week 46	2020	6.1	1	
Week 47	2020	7.0	1	
Week 48	2020	6.8	1	
Week 49	2020	6.4	1	
Week 50	2020	6.0	1	
Week 51	2020	5.6	3	
Week 52	2020	5.8	3	
Week 1	2021	4.8	5	
Week 2	2021	5.5	3	
Week 3	2021	5.6	2	
Week 4	2021	5.5	1	
Week 5	2021	4.9	4	
Week 6	2021	5.2	1	
Week 7	2021	4.7	2	
Week 8	2021	4.4	5	
