= Koodevide (TV series) =

2021 Malayalam TV series

- Genre: Drama; Romance; Thriller
- Developed by: Leena Gangopadhyay
- Screenplay by: G.S. Anil; Saseendran Vadakara; Manoj Ramachandran
- Story by: Leena Gangopadhyay
- Directed by: S.S. Lal
- Creative director: R. Sugathan
- Presented by: Movie Mill
- Starring: Sreedhanya
- Theme music composer: Jai
- Opening theme: "Neelavaanil Alayunn.." Sung by Ranjin Raj and Neenu Babu (RJ Neenu)
- Composers: Music: Ranjin Raj; Lyrics: B.K. Harinarayanan
- Country of origin: India
- Original language: Malayalam
- No. of seasons: 1
- No. of episodes: 686

Production
- Producer: Krishnan Sethukumar
- Production location: Trivandrum
- Cinematography: Rajeev Mankompu; Manoj Kumar
- Editor: Vijil
- Camera setup: Multi-camera
- Running time: 22 minutes (approx.)
- Production company: Rajaputhra Visual Media

Original release
- Network: Asianet; Disney+ Hotstar
- Release: 4 January 2021 – 22 July 2023

Koodevide (transl. Where's the Nest?) is an Indian Malayalam television romance drama thriller television series that aired on the Malayalam General Entertainment Channel Asianet from 4 January 2021 to 22 July 2023 and is also available on the digital platform Disney+ Hotstar. The show is produced by Movie Mill of Krishnan Sethukumar, and stars Bipin Jose, Anshitha Akbarsha, Krishna Kumar (later replaced by Anil Mohan), and Sreedhanya in the leads. It is an official remake of Bengali series Mohor.

== Synopsis ==
Soorya, a talented and family-oriented girl, sets out to prove her mettle and support her family after her father faces losses in his business. She meets Rishikesh "Rishi", an arrogant misogynist.

== Plot ==
Rishikesh "Rishi" is a modern-day misogynist who feels that women are not allowed to be independent. The reason for his condition is because his mother unwillingly left him at a young age, to take care of her elderly parents. Rishi was raised by his paternal aunt Rani, a cruel and cunning woman who hates Rishi's mother. While Soorya Kaimal, is a determined and headstrong girl, who wishes to make a mark on the society and feels that women must be independent.

Soorya comes from a middle-class family, her father, Shivaram, who was once a businessman, had gone bankrupt. Soorya has no desire to marry, as she wants to learn and pursue higher jobs so that she can help her family. Her mother, Devamma and elder sister Arya support Soorya. Arya was married to a cruel man named Mohan, who wishes to inherit wealth from the Kaimal family. Her father wants her to marry.

Shocked, Soorya escapes from the marriage hall, and take shelter in her teacher, Aditi's house. Aditi becomes Soorya's mentor. Aditi is none other than Rishi's mother who left him at a young age. She regrets her mistake and wants to reconcile with her son. Meanwhile, Rishi is engaged to a beautiful and wealthy girl named Mithra. However, Mithra is unready to marry and goes to US to pursue higher studies.

A goon named, Basavanna attacks Aditi and she is taken to the hospital. Soorya and Aditi's estranged husband, Aditya is much worried about her condition. Aditya's sister in law, Lakshmi asks Rishi to meet a hospitalized Aditi. However, Rishi is reluctant as he hates Aditi for leaving him. However, hesitant, Rishi meets Aditi. It is shown that Rishi is not a bad person, feeling sorry about his mother Rishi sees her. However, Rani who learns of this, confront Aditi. Rishi overhears their conversation and once again hates her. Recovered, Aditi manages to gain admission for Soorya in Adi Keshava college with the help of Aditya. Rishi bombards Soorya with questions but she wins the interview.

However, as the college starts the students take instant dislike towards Soorya and mistreat her. Especially, Neetu and Neema, who are Rishi's spoilt cousin sisters. One day, while writing a scholarship exam, Rani decides to plot against Soorya, she asks her nieces Neetu and Neema for help. Eventually, they falsely accuse Soorya of cheating. However, Rishi gives her a last chance. Soorya plans to leave the college unable to bear the humiliation. Rishi convinces her not to.

Soon, Rishi starts to feel jealous of the closeness between SP Sooraj and Soorya. Soon, Rishi falls for Soorya. He tries to help her every time but Soorya feels that Rishi is using her to gain fame for the college. However, she too falls for Rishi. Unfortunately, Mithra makes a re-entry to disrupt Soorya and Rishi's closeness.

Rishi is always hostile towards Mithra. Meanwhile, Shivaram lied to Soorya, Arya, Shekar and Devamma that he is working in a good company as the assistant of its owner. However, Devamma and Arya discovers that Shivaram was lying to them after Devamma finds a security uniform in Shivaram's cupboard. Shivaram reveals that he works as the security of the company godown.

Arya is shattered, knowing the truth. Fortunately, Aditi calls Arya to send her qualifications so that she can find a job. Successfully, Aditi consults her best friend, Ramadevi "Rama". Rama is the head of the same company in which Shivaram works. Shivaram learns that Soorya and Aditi are coming to his company, fearing, his truth will be revealed, he hides from them. While, Rama is fascinated by Arya's qualifications and agrees to provide her a job.

However, things turn bitter, when Sabu, a goon comes to Soorya's house, while they were away. He collects Soorya and Aditi's number. In the past, Sabu had attempted to abduct Soorya but she was saved by Rishi. Sabu goes to Rishi's house and manipulates Rani against Rishi. Sabu manages to receive Rishi's number. Meanwhile, Shekar decides to sell his house to make both ends meet.

Meanwhile, Mithra is disappointed to see a sudden change in Rishi's behaviour. She tries her best to win his heart, but all in vain. Soon, Mithra, Rani, Anandan (Rani's brother), Kunjiraman "Kunji" (Rani's husband) starts to suspect if Rishi is attracted to Soorya. While, Aditi and Soorya are worried if Sabu would cause troubles to them and Rishi. Aditi contacts Aditya and asks him to alert Rishi of the problem.

Later, Devamma and Shivaram are celebrating their wedding anniversary. This time, Mohan makes a re-entry and acts as if he is a changed man. He buys gifts for Devamma and Shivaram and expensive clothes for Arya, so that Shekar can be jealous. Arya refuses to accept Mohan's gift. Later, when Arya gets a job, Mohan coerces her to come with him in the car so that he can drop her to the office.

Problems, keep arising when Rani and Sabu plots to ruin Soorya's life. They call upon Soorya's cruel ex-fiancé to take her away when the time comes. They also plot to perform Rishi and Mithra's marriage without Rishi's knowledge as Rishi don't want to wed Mithra. Rani and Kunji visit an astrologer to finalize Mithra and Rishi's wedding. The astrologer objects as Rishi and Mithra's kundlis don't match.

One day Soorya visits Sabu's grandmother on Sabu's request; however, he tries to abduct Soorya and lock her up in a room. Rishi gets to know about Soorya's visit and rescues her from Sabu and gang and finally they reveal their feelings each other and fall in love in the rain. Meanwhile, Mohanan and the house owner enter Shekaran's house and try to harass Arya but Shekaran saves Arya and fatally injures Mohanan and they go from this house.

Arya and Shekar get married secretly. On Aditi's advice, Rishi and Soorya take shelter in Aditi's ancestral house, Aalanchery. There, they are warmly welcomed by Aditi's uncle, who is unaware that Rishi is Aditi's son. However, another problem starts when Aditi's cruel cousin, Jagannathan "Jagan" comes. Rani tries many ways to bring Rishi back home and Mithra vows to take revenge on Soorya for spoiling her life and she decides to act like a good person. Rani and Jagan join hands to bring rishi back home. He tries to trouble Soorya and Rishi. Aditi's uncle reveals about how many hardships Aditi faced in her life because of Jagan and Rani. He also mentions that Rani had conspired against Aditi to take Rishi away from her. Rishi realises about how much Aditi loved for him. Rishi calls Aditi to invite her over Aalanchery to perform her father's Śrāddha. After Aditi's arrival, Rishi grows more close to her and realises her value. One day, as Jagan creates a commotion to inherit Aalanchery, Rishi stands up against him and supports Aditi. For the first time, he addresses Aditi as his mother in the public. Aditi is much overjoyed. As they are about to return, an unknown car causes an accident to them planned by Jagan. Meanwhile, Devamma and Shivarama Kaimal gets to know about Mohanan's intentions and a furious Kaimal goes berserk and thrashes Mohanan in hospital.

Meanwhile, Rishi and Soorya return to college however Mithra, Rani, Neethu and Hima plan to ruin Soorya's life. The college announces exam and Mithra tries to reduce Soorya's score and give her low marks. Soorya believes she has got good marks and warns college staff that she will protest if her paper is not re-evaluated.

Trouble brew up for Soorya and Rishi when Jagan threatens Soorya and her parents and Rani forbids Soorya from meeting Aditi if she wants to marry Rishi. Jagan realizes that Rani cheated her. Rani then makes a plan to finish Soorya along with Neethu and Hima by organizing a trip along with Soorya, Rishi and Mithra to a place called Thevermala a dangerous place. So they start for trip and reach at the place and start exploring but a stranger hired by Rani and Jagan follows them and Rishi notices the stranger and tries to confront him. Neethu watches this and she decides to finish the task by pushing Soorya down by organizing selfie. But unfortunately Mithra gets pushed by Neethu. Soorya tries to save her, but Mithra loses grip and falls down, placing everyone in a shocked and sad state, including Soorya, Rishi and Mithra's parents. They reach her at the hospital and the police arrive to investigate the incident. Neethu gives false testimony against Soorya on the advice of Rani. Rishi gets to know this and tries to help Soorya by escaping her with Aditi, but Soorya gets arrested. These police officers working under Rani and Jagan tried to harass Soorya but Rishi protects her by sitting for her whole night at police station. Sooraj saves them and lashes out at the officers. Then Soorya faces backlash from teachers by protesting that they will continue teaching if Soorya is suspended resulting in Soorya's suspension. Will Soorya's innocence be proved?

== Cast ==
=== Lead cast ===
- Anshitha Akbarsha as Soorya Kaimal, Rani's and Rajeev's daughter; Shivarama and Devamma's adoptive daughter, Arya's and Nithin's adoptive sister, Shekhar's cousin, Adithi's student and Rishi's fiance and lover
- Bipin Jose as Rishikesh Adithyan (Rishi), Adhithi and Adithyan's son, Soorya's boyfriend and fiancee
- Sreedhanya as Aditi Padmanabhan, Adithyan's wife and Rishi's mother who she support in Soorya's educations
- Nisha Mathew as Rani aka Raniamma, Adithyan's and Anandan's sister, Rajeevchandra's wife and Soorya's biological mother
- Ravikrishnan Gopalakrishnan as Rajeev Chandra Balika (Balika), Rani's husband and Soorya's biological father
- Krishnakumar /Anil Kumar as Adithyan (Aadi), Adithi's husband, Rishi's father, Rani's and Anandan's brother

=== Recurring cast ===
- Prakash S. P as Komban Sekharan
  - Arya's love interest, Devamma and Shivarama's nephew, Soorya's cousin
- Chilanka S Deedu as Arya
  - Devamma and Shivarama's eldest daughter, Soorya's and Nithin's elder sister, Shekhar's love interest, Mohanan's former wife.
- Manve (Sruthy Surendran) as Mithra
  - Rishi's fiancé, Hema and Thampi's daughter.
- Indulekha as Lakshmi
  - Anandan's wife, Neetu and Neema's mother, Adithya and Rani's sister-in-law. Rishi's aunt
- Sudarsanan as Shivarama Kaimal
  - Soorya's adoptive father, Nithin and Arya's father, Devamma's husband.
- Sindhu Varma as Devamma
  - Soorya's adoptive mother, Nithin and Arya's mother, Shivarama's wife
- Santhosh K as Kunjiraman
  - Rani's husband, Anandan and Aditya's brother-in-law, Aditi and Lakshmi's co-brother.
- Devendranath as SP Sooraj IPS
- Santhosh Sanjay as Roshan k. Roshan
  - Soorya's friend
- Midhun as Nithin
  - Soorya and Arya's brother, Devamma and Shivarama's only son.
- Abees as Shivamohan Thampi
  - Mithra's father, Hema's husband
- Archana as Aami
- Nayana Josan as Neethu
  - Anandan and Lakshmi's daughter, Neema's sister.
- Shahina Siyad/ Prarthana Krishna as Neema
  - Neetu's sister, Lakshmi and Anandan's daughter, Rishi's cousin, Rani and Aditya's niece.
- Kripa Sekhar as Sana Fathima
  - Surya's best friend
- Roshan K as Roshan
  - Sana's boyfriend and canteenboy at Adikeshava college
- Ajith M Gopinath as Ananthan
  - Adithyan and Rani's brother, Lakshmi's husband, Aditi and Kunjiraman's brother-in-law.
- Roshan Mathew John as Hema
  - Mithra's mother, Thampi's wife.
- Raheena Anas as Kalki
- Stella Raj
- Manjulan as Jagannathan
- Ratheesh Sundar as Karippety Sabu
- Sundara Pandian as Basavanna
- Harisree Martin as CC Saileshkumar VP
- Kochu Preman as Bhasi Pillai
- Akhil S Prasad as Vivek
- Renjusha Menon as Jyothilakshmi

=== Guest appearance ===
- V. Suresh Thampanoor as DJ Aristo Suresh
- Avanthika Mohan as ASP Sreya Nandini IPS
- Meera Vasudevan as Sumithra
- Dr. Shaju Sham as Rohith
- Sajan Surya as Govind

== Production ==
=== Casting ===
Malayalam actor Krishnakumar is making his comeback to Malayalam television after a Hiatus of 13 years, he has portrayed male lead in several TV series in early 2000s. Sreedhanya is making her serial acting debut with this series.

== Adaptations ==
Language	Title	Original release	Network(s)	Last aired	Notes
Bengali	Mohor মোহর	28 October 2019	Star Jalsha	3 April 2022	Original
Kannada	Sarasu ಸರಸು	11 November 2020	Star Suvarna	28 August 2021	Remake
Telugu	Guppedantha Manasu గుప్పెడంత మనసు	7 December 2020	Star Maa	Ongoing	Remake
Hindi	Shaurya Aur Anokhi Ki Kahani शौर्य और अनोखी की कहानी	21 December 2020	StarPlus	24 July 2021	Remake
Malayalam	Koodevide കൂടെവിടെ	4 January 2021	Asianet	22 July 2023	Remake
Tamil	Kaatrukkenna Veli காற்றுக்கென்ன வேலி	18 January 2021	Star Vijay	30 September 2023	Remake
Marathi	Swabhiman – Shodh Astitvacha स्वाभिमान – शोध अस्तित्वाचा	22 February 2021	Star Pravah	6 May 2023	Remake
