= Rang Majha Vegla =

Indian television series

- Genre: Drama
- Directed by: Chandrakant Gaikwad
- Starring: See below
- Theme music composer: Nilesh Moharir
- Opening theme: "Rang Majha Vegla" by Aanandi Joshi and Mangesh Borgaonkar
- Country of origin: India
- Original language: Marathi
- No. of episodes: 1129

Production
- Producers: Aparna Ketkar and Atul Ketkar (2019-2023); Shashi Mittal and Sumit Mittal (2023)
- Production locations: Mumbai, Maharashtra, India
- Editor: Rupesh Gamre
- Camera setup: Multi-camera
- Running time: 22 minutes
- Production companies: Right Click Media Solutions (2019-2023); Shashi Sumeet Productions (2023)

Original release
- Network: Star Pravah
- Release: 30 October 2019 – 3 September 2023

Related
- Karuthamuthu

Rang Majha Vegla or Rang Maza Vegla ('My Colour Is Different') is an Indian Marathi language soap opera that aired on Star Pravah. It premiered on 30 October 2019. It is an official remake of Malayalam TV series Karuthamuthu. It is produced by Shashi Mittal and Sumeet Mittal under the banner of Shashi Sumeet Productions. It stars Ashutosh Gokhale and Reshma Shinde in lead roles.

== Plot ==
This is the love story of a dark-skinned girl Deepa and Dr Kartik and the problems faced by them. Kartik's mother Saundary initially opposes their marriage but later wants them to be together. Due to certain misunderstandings, Deepa and Kartik are separated after which Deepa gives birth to twin girls one of which is named Kartiki and the other Deepika. Kartiki remains with Deepa and Deepika with Kartik.

Kartiki and Deepika are grown up. Kartiki lives a simple life in a village with Deepa while Deepika lives a rich life in Mumbai with the Inamdar family. Deepa comes to Mumbai for her treatment of lungs disease on Kartiki's insistence. Kartiki enrolls to the school where Deepika studies and they both become friends. Ayesha and Kartik plan to engage the day after Deepika's school trip. Meanwhile, Deepa and Kartik run over upon each other without knowing. Circumstances lead Kartik running late for the engagement. Deepa and Kartik appear in court where Deepa stops their divorce, but Ayesha kidnaps Kartiki so Deepa can agree to divorce. Kartik and Deepa has their divorce filed in the court. Deepa decides to get Ayeshas truth in front of everyone and succeeds in doing so. Later, Kartik and Deepa get married.

One day Kartik gets in an argument with Deepas best friend Sakshi who suddenly has a stomach ache and is rushed to the hospital. Emergency surgery is required but the doctor is not available and Kartik performs her surgery. But Sakshi dies. The blame is put on Kartik, who is put in Jail for 14 years. Kartiki makes Deepa responsible for Kartik being in jail.

Both Kartiki and Deepika have grown up. Kartiki does not consider Deepa to be her mother and does not talk to her. Soon Kartik comes home from jail and decides to teach Deepa a lesson and joins hands with Shweta. But as he loves Deepa he is unable to do so.

Kartiki has a boyfriend named Aaryan. Deepika also has a love interest whose name is Nakul. It is later revealed that Nakul and Aaryan are the same person. He is revealed to be Ayeshas nephew. He is shown to be doing this as a revenge as he is told that Kartik Inamdar was responsible for Ayesha to be mentally unstable. He then joins hands with Kartik and Deepa to help catch Ayesha as she killed Sakshi. The story ends with Deepika and Aaryan deciding to marry.

== Cast ==
=== Main ===
- Reshma Shinde as Deepa Inamdar (née Devkule) – Shrirang's daughter; Radha's step-daughter; Shweta's half-sister; Kartik's wife; Kartiki and Deepika's mother
- Ashutosh Gokhale as Dr. Kartik Inamdar – Saundarya and Lalit's elder son; Lavanya and Aditya's brother; Deepa's husband; Kartiki and Deepika's father

=== Recurring ===
Kartik's family

- Anushka Pimputkar as Kartiki Inamdar – Deepa and Kartik's elder daughter; Deepika's twin sister
  - Saisha Bhoir / Maitreyi Date as Child Kartiki Inamdar
- Tanishka Vishe as Deepika Inamdar – Deepa and Kartik's younger daughter; Kartiki's twin sister
  - Spruha Dali as Child Deepika Inamdar
- Harshada Khanvilkar as Soundarya Inamdar – Lalit's wife; Lavanya, Kartik and Aditya's mother; Kartiki and Deepika's grandmother
- Shrirang Deshmukh as Lalit Inamdar – Saundarya's husband; Lavanya, Kartik and Aditya's father; Kartiki and Deepika's grandfather
- Ambar Ganpule / Bhagyesh Patil as Aditya Inamdar – Saundarya and Lalit's younger son; Lavanya and Kartik's brother; Shweta's husband; Onkar's father
- Anagha Bhagare as Shweta Inamdar (née Devkule) – Shrirang and Radha's daughter; Deepa's half-sister; Aditya's wife; Onkar's mother
- Shalmalee Tolye as Lavanya Inamdar – Saundarya and Lalit's daughter; Kartik and Aditya's sister

Deepa's family

- Pournima Talwalkar as Radha Devkule – Shrirang's second wife; Shweta's mother; Deepa's step-mother; Kartiki and Deepika's step-grandmother
- Gautam Murudeshwar as Shrirang Devkule – Radha's husband; Deepa and Shweta's father; Kartiki and Deepika's grandfather
- Vandana Marathe as Radha's mother; Shweta and Deepa's grandmother

=== Others ===
- Abhidnya Bhave as Tanuja Mantri – Kartik's colleague and obsessive lover
- Vidisha Mhaskar as Ayesha Deshmukh – Kartik's fiancé
- Meghan Jadhav as Aryan / Nakul – Kartiki's boyfriend, Deepika's love interest, Ayesha's nephew, Richa's son
- Nikhil Rajeshirke as Sujay – Deepa's childhood friend
- Manasi Ghate as Sakshi – Deepa's childhood friend
- Vaishali Bhosale as Ashwini – Deepa's helper
- Amruta Bane as Nikita – Soundarya's assistant
- Rujuta Deshmukh as Sudha Athawale – Deepa's helper
- Shirish Joshi as Mr. Athawale – Sudha's husband; Deepa's helper
- Priya Kambale / Chitra Gadgil as Mrs. Deshmukh – Ayesha's mother
- Vanita Kharat as Interview Candidate for Job

=== Guest appearances ===
- Nandita Patkar as Sarita from Sahkutumb Sahparivar at Deepa's Haldi ceremony
- Supriya Pathare as Ambika from Molkarin Bai – Mothi Tichi Savali
- Riteish Deshmukh as Satya Jadhav from Ved
- Genelia Deshmukh as Shravani Shinde Jadhav from Ved
- Avani Taywade as Swara Kamat from Tuzech Mi Geet Gaat Aahe at Deepa's engagement
- Abhijeet Khandkekar as Malhar Kamat from Tuzech Mi Geet Gaat Aahe at Deepa's engagement
- Sayali Deodhar as Sindhu Sawant Ratnaparkhi from Lagnachi Bedi at Deepa's engagement
- Sanket Pathak as Raghav Ratnakar Ratnaparkhi from Lagnachi Bedi at Deepa's engagement
- Girija Prabhu as Gauri Shirke-Patil Shinde from Sukh Mhanje Nakki Kay Asta! at Deepa's wedding
- Mandar Jadhav as Jaydeep Shinde from Sukh Mhanje Nakki Kay Asta! at Deepa's wedding
- Saisha Salvi as Laxmi Shinde from Sukh Mhanje Nakki Kay Asta! at Deepa's wedding

== Production ==
This show was announced by Right Click Media Solutions on Star Pravah as an official adaptation of Malayalam TV series Karuthamuthu. Reshma Shinde and Ashutosh Gokhale were signed as the leads. Pudhcha Paaul fame Harshada Khanvilkar was roped to play the lead antagonist Saundarya Inamdar. Actress Anagha Bhagare, Ambar Ganpule, Pournima Talwalkar, Abhidnya Bhave were roped in for prominent roles. Actress Vidisha Mhaskar was roped in to play the negative lead Ayesha.

As the series progressed, Harshada Khanvilkar's character became positive while Ashutosh Gokhale's character turned negative. Saisha Bhoir and Spruha Dali were introduced as Kartik and Deepa's twin daughter Kartiki and Deepika. Soon, Saisha was replaced by Maitreyi Date.

A 14 years generation leap was introduced on 5 March 2023 when Maitreyi Date was replaced by Anushka Pimputkar as elder Kartiki and Spruha Dali was replaced by Tanishka Vishe as elder Deepika. Since 30 January 2023, the series is being produced by Shashi Mittal and Sumeet Mittal under their production house Shashi Sumeet Productions. The show maintain its TRP in Top 5 Marathi TV shows.
