= Hrudayi Preet Jagate =

2022 Indian Marathi-language TV series

- Genre: Drama
- Written by: Sagar Kheur, Abhijeet Shende
- Directed by: Mandar Devsthali
- Starring: See below
- Country of origin: India
- Original language: Marathi
- No. of episodes: 176

Production
- Producer: Rajesh Joshi
- Production locations: Mumbai, Maharashtra
- Camera setup: Multi-camera
- Running time: 22 minutes
- Production company: Swami Om Televisions

Original release
- Network: Zee Marathi
- Release: 7 November 2022 – 27 May 2023

Hrudayi Preet Jagate (transl. Presence of Love in Heart) is an Indian Marathi language TV series which aired on Zee Marathi. It is directed by Mandar Devsthali and produced by Rajesh Joshi under the banner of Swami Om Televisions. It aired from 7 November 2022 and ended on 27 May 2023 completing 176 episodes. It starred Pooja Katurde and Siddharth Khirid in lead roles.

== Plot ==
A musical love story of Veena and Prabhas who come from totally different backgrounds but share the same passion for music.

=== Special episode (1 hour) ===
- 29 January 2023
- 12 February 2023

=== Airing history ===
No.	Airing Date	Days	Time (IST)
1	7 November 2022 – 11 March 2023	Mon-Sat (sometimes Sun)	8 pm
2	13 March – 27 May 2023	Mon-Sat (sometimes Sun)	1.30 pm

== Cast ==
=== Main ===
- Pooja Katurde as Veena Raghunath Abhyankar / Veena Prabhas Sadavarte
- Siddharth Khirid as Prabhas Sadavarte

=== Recurring ===
Prabhas' family

- Pournima Talwalkar as Shailaja Yogeshwar Sadavarte - Prabhas' aunt
- Vidyadhar Paranjape as Yogeshwar Sadavarte - Prabhas' grandfather
- Raju Bawadekar as Shailesh Yogeshwar Sadavarte - Prabhas' uncle
- Deepali Chaugule as Yogini Shailesh Sadavarte - Mihir's mother
- Sachin Deshpande as Mihir Shailesh Sadavarte - Prabhas' brother
- Manvita Joshi as Mihika Shailesh Sadavarte (Micky) - Prabhas' sister

Veena's family

- Rajan Bhise as Raghunath Abhyankar - Veena's father
- Pankaj Vishnu as Manohar Jogalekar - Veena's uncle
- Deepa Jadhav as Rajani Manohar Jogalekar - Veena's aunt
- Trushna Chandratre as Urmila Manohar Jogalekar - Veena's sister

Others

- Chinmayee Jogalekar as Chinmayee Kamerkar (Chika)
- Harshala Barade as Karishma (Cash)
- Dnyaneshwari Deshpande as Gojiri (Kha Kha)
- Sanchita Gupte as Sanchita (Ubha Dosa)
- Ranjit Patil as Pravin (Uncle)
- Ashish Joshi as Ajay
- Shilpa Kulkarni as Arundhati
- Eknath Gite as Kishor Rangade-Patil (Kishya)
- Vijay Sutar as Kishya's P.A.
- Mandar Devsthali as Mr. Raje
