= Laagi Tujhse Lagan =

Indian television series

- Genre: Action Crime drama Romance Suspense
- Screenplay by: Jayesh Patil; Vinod Ranganathan; Manoj Tripathi
- Directed by: Yash Chauhan; Mayank Gupta; Dinesh Mahadev; Ramesh Pandey
- Starring: See Below
- Country of origin: India
- Original language: Hindi
- No. of seasons: 1
- No. of episodes: 512

Production
- Producers: Paresh Rawal; Swaroop Sampat; Hemal Thakkar
- Production location: Mumbai
- Camera setup: Multi-camera
- Running time: 24 minutes
- Production company: Playtime Creationn

Original release
- Network: Colors TV
- Release: 28 December 2009 – 6 January 2012

Laagi Tujhse Lagan (transl. Determined to Love You) is an Indian television series that aired Monday to Thursday on Colors TV from 28 December 2009 to 6 January 2012.

Set in rural Maharashtra, it is the love story of Nakusha portrayed by Mahii Vij, a beautiful young woman who is forced to hide her beauty, and Dutta Bhau portrayed by Mishal Raheja (later by Shabbir Ahluwalia) who is a local gangster.

== Plot ==
Nakusha is a young woman who lives with her mother Babi, father Ganpat, and brother Sethji. As her elder sister Roopa intimidated by her friend uses her beauty for immoral gains and leaves for Dubai for better life despite opposition from babi.Due to fear Nakusha may meet same fate as Roopa babi blackens skin of Nakusha to appear less attractive. A corrupt police officer, Malmal More, discovers her secret and arranges their engagement. However, Babi uncovers More’s plan to sell Nakusha in Dubai and helps her escape, where she meets Dutta Bhau, a gangster, who saves Nakusha's life but is badly injured. Grateful, Nakusha helps him recover, and Dutta brings Nakusha and her family to live with him as domestic workers. Dutta’s three sisters, Kala, Leela, and Roops, secretly covet his wealth and pretend to care for him, while his childhood friend Bajirao remains loyal.

Unafraid of Dutta, Nakusha encourages him to quit drinking. When Dutta's mother tries to convince him to marry a girl named Supriya, Dutta hesitates and reveals to Nakusha about his failed relationship with a woman, Seema, who left him for a richer man, before becoming a gangster. Nakusha encourages Dutta to give Supriya a chance and their wedding is fixed. However, Supriya is in love with another man, Ravi, and Kala manipulates the situation, leading to Supriya eloping on her wedding day. Dutta, believing Nakusha helped her escape, angrily marries Nakusha in retaliation.

Dutta and Nakusha start an uneasy marriage with Dutta mistreating her. When Dutta finally discovers her innocence, he asks her to leave him. However, Dutta and Nakusha are soon lost in a jungle when goons of Dutta's enemy, Anna attack them. There, they meet Jagtap Dada who makes Dutta realize Nakusha's worth before he dies saving them. Nakusha is abducted by Anna. Dutta kills Anna and, now in love with her, brings Nakusha home. Kala and her sisters fail to separate them. Dutta learns about his father, Damodar Patil and his half-sister, Madhu. Damodar soon dies due to cancer.

The family decides to arrange a wedding ceremony for Dutta and Nakusha. On the wedding night, Dutta discovers Nakusha’s true fair complexion, which angers him, but Nakusha’s unwavering love wins him over. A rival of Dutta, Chaskar, causes his accident. Dutta survives but becomes blind and encounters Seema. Nakusha's search leads her to Dutta, and they end up in a village, where Dutta has his eyesight cured and Chaskar is killed. Kala is then exposed before Dutta, and she kidnaps his family, while Leela's husband, Sudarshan, joins Kala. Dutta saves the whole family, forgives Sudarshan, and kicks out Kala. Leela and Roops, fed up with Kala's plans, pledge allegiance to their brother. Dutta and Nakusha return home, and Dutta's mentor, Nana Saheb, comes to live with them.

While praying at a temple, Dutta is abducted, and Nakusha disappears. Bajirao is accused of the crime and is thrown out of the house by Dutta's mother. When it is revealed that Bajirao is innocent and Nana Saheb is the culprit, Dutta's family is forced to leave their home. Meanwhile, Nakusha is given shelter by a woman in a fishery village. However, she remembers nothing from her past life and is named Sahiba. She then meets Dighu, who falls in love with her. Eventually, Dutta, who is held hostage by Nana, escapes, and it is revealed that Nana and Kala had been working together. Dighu, unaware of this, brings Nakusha to Nana's house. Dighu helps Baji and the family by returning them to their home that was under Nana's hands. He then discovers that Nana is guilty of his mother's death and kills him. Dutta then discovers that Dighu is the one who kidnapped him and punishes him. Nakusha, now pregnant, leaves the house, not wanting her child to be raised in a gangster's home. Dutta follows her and begins to change his life. Yoginder shoots Dutta's mother as Sudarshan watches. Nakusha is kidnapped by Yoginder, who is eventually killed along with his sister Sunaina and Dighu. The show concludes with Dutta and Nakusha reuniting.

== Cast ==
=== Main ===
- Mahhi Vij as Nakusha Patil / Nakusha Bhau: Ganpat and Badi's daughter; Roopa and Sethji's sister; Dutta's wife; Damodar's daughter-in-law; Kalavati, Roopvati and Leelavati's sister-in-law
- Mishal Raheja / Shabbir Ahluwalia as Dutta Patil / Dutta Bhau: Damodar's son; Kalavati, Roopvati and Leelavati's brother; Madhu's half-brother; Nakusha's husband; Ganpat and Badi's son-in-law; Roopa and Sethji's brother-in-law

=== Recurring ===
- Kali Prasad Mukherjee as Ganpat: Roopa, Nakusha's step father and Sethji's father
- Chinmayee Surve as Babi: Roopa, Nakusha and Sethji's mother
- Jay Thakkar as Sethji: Nakusha and Roopa's younger brother
- Swati Chitnis as Aayi Sahib
- Vinay Rohrra as Baaji Rao: Dutta's best friend and second-in-command
- Aashka Goradia as Kalavati "Kala": Dutta's elder sister
- Jaineeraj Rajpurohit as Kishore: Kalavati's husband
- Tinnu Anand as Damodar Patil: Dutta's estranged father
- Soni Singh as Madhu: Dutta's Paternal half-sister
- Neetu Wadhwa as Roopvati "Roops": Dutta's youngest sister
- Ansha Sayed / Falaq Naaz as Leelavati "Leela": Dutta's younger sister
- Sumit Kaul as Sudarshan: Leela's husband
- Kannan Arunachalam as Raghunath "Nana Saheb" Tawde: Dutta Bhau's mentor
- Murli Sharma as Maleshwar Anna
- Mouli Ganguly as Subbalakshmi
- Pavan Malhotra as Malmar More: a corrupt police officer
- Ridhi Dogra as Supriya: Dutta's ex-fiancée
- Pranitaa Pandit as Seema: Dutta's ex-girlfriend
- Aadesh Chaudhary as Digambar/Munna
- Sunayana Fozdar as Sunayana: Yogendra's younger sister and Deegu's obsessive lover
- Anupam Bhattacharya as Yogendra: Sunayana's elder brother and Dutta's enemy
- Riddhi Nayak as Indumati
- Dino James as village boy.
- Saiyami Kher as Roopa : Babi's daughter, sethji and nakusha's elder sister. Ganpath's step daughter.

== Reception ==
Ratings

Laagi Tujhse Lagan was one of the most watched Hindi GEC. The show was its peak from the beginning till the end of March 2011.

In week of 26 March 2011, it occupied second position with 5.6 TVR.

After the exit of lead actor Mishal Raheja in last week of March 2011, the show TRP rating started to go down and eventually ended in January 2012.

== Adaptations ==
Language	Title	Original release	Network(s)	Last aired	Notes
Marathi	Tujhya Rupacha Chandana तुझ्या रूपाचं चांदणं	27 December 2021	Colors Marathi	28 May 2022	Remake
Kannada	Drishti Bottu ದೃಷ್ಟಿ ಬೊಟ್ಟು	10 September 2024	Colors Kannada	21 September 2025	Remake
