= Yogyogeshwar Jai Shankar =

2022 Indian Marathi-language TV series

- Genre: Spirituality
- Written by: Balkrushna Tidake
- Directed by: Chinmay Udgirkar
- Starring: See below
- Country of origin: India
- Original language: Marathi
- No. of episodes: 460

Production
- Executive producers: Chetan Birla, Vaibhav Rangrao Patil
- Producer: Sanjay Zankar
- Production locations: Nashik, Maharashtra
- Cinematography: Vinayak Jadhav
- Editor: Ganesh Lamhane
- Camera setup: Multi-camera
- Running time: 22 minutes
- Production company: Zankar Films

Original release
- Network: Colors Marathi
- Release: 30 May 2022 – 14 October 2023

Yogyogeshwar Jai Shankar is an Indian Marathi language spiritual TV series which aired on Colors Marathi. It is directed by Chinmay Udgirkar and produced by Sanjay Zankar under the banner of Zankar Films. It premiered from 30 May 2022 by replacing Tujhya Rupacha Chandana. It stars Aarush Bedekar and Sangram Samel in lead roles.

== Plot ==
A master in the tradition of Nath Siddhas and one of the greatest Yogi saints of Maharashtra from the modern age, Shankar Maharaj, brought changes to the lives of those who needed them the most. The series concludes with Shankar Maharaj's departure from Solapur after bidding adieu to his devotees.

== Cast ==
=== Main ===
- Aarush Bedekar as child Shankar Maharaj
  - Sangram Samel as adult Shankar Maharaj

=== Recurring ===
- Uma Pendharkar
- Vishwanath Kulkarni as Onkarnath Bhasme
- Srushti Pagare as Pawani
- Abhijeet Kelkar
- Veena Jagtap
