= Bigg Boss Marathi season 5 =

Indian Marathi reality show

Bigg Boss Marathi
- Season 5
- Presented by: Riteish Deshmukh
- No. of days: 70
- No. of housemates: 17
- Winner: Suraj Chavan
- Runner-up: Abhijeet Sawant
- No. of episodes: 71

Release
- Original network: Colors Marathi; JioHotstar
- Original release: 28 July – 6 October 2024

Season chronology
- ← Previous; Season 4 Next → Season 6

Bigg Boss Marathi 5 is the fifth season of Marathi version of reality television show Bigg Boss broadcast in India. The grand premiere was held on 28 July 2024 on Colors Marathi and JioCinema.

It recorded TRP of 2.4 TVR for grand premiere episode which is highest ever for grand premiere episodes of all 5 seasons of show along with TRP reaching up to 5 TVR which broke all records of in history of Non-Fiction Shows and Bigg Boss Marathi season 5 became most highest ever rated season in history of all Bigg Boss seasons combined. Riteish Deshmukh hosted the show for the first time. The Grand Finale of the show took place on October 6, 2024, where Suraj Chavhan emerged as the winner, with Abhijeet Sawant securing the runner-up position.

== Production ==
=== Teaser ===
The season was announced on 21 May 2024 by makers and the channel. Mahesh Manjrekar who presented the first four seasons announced his departure from the show and later replaced by Riteish Deshmukh.

=== Development ===
The press conference and launch event for this season was held on 22 July 2024, anchored by journalist Dnyanada Kadam.

=== Eye logo ===
The eye logo features a new golden color scheme, numerous open and closed windows, and two nails supporting the eye.

=== House ===
The house of this season had a “Maze” theme. This house is referred as “Chakravyuh”. The house is located in Film City, Mumbai for the fourth time.

=== Bhaucha Dhakka ===
This season's weekend episodes were named as Bhaucha Dhakka. Stage was recreated as Bhaucha Dhakka where host Riteish Deshmukh who is fondly called as Bhau will officiate in his style and it would be his reign.

=== Tanta Ghar ===
This season's weekend episodes had a special setup created in Activity Area which was named as Tanta Ghar. In this housemates who queried during a week will feature and would express their anger against each other by taking it on kept objects and at the end if bell rings due to that then they will get surprise by Bigg Boss.

Week	1	2
Housemates	Aarya; Jahnavi	Arbaz; Abhijeet
Surprise	Personal 30,000; BB currency to each	Personal 50,000; BB currency to each

Host Riteish Deshmukh Selfie with winner and runner-up of season alongside trophy

=== Trophy ===
The trophy was revealed on 04th October which had a maze covering eye of Bigg Boss standing on a platform.

== Housemates status ==
Sl.no	Housemates	Day entered	Day Exited	Housemates status
1	Ankita	Day 1	Day 70	Winner
2	Abhijeet	Day 1	Day 70	1st Runner up
3	Nikki	Day 1	Day 70	2nd Runner-up
4	Dhananjay	Day 1	Day 70	3rd Runner-up
5	Suraj	Day 1	Day 70	4th Runner-up
6	Jahnavi	Day 1	Day 70	5th Runner-up, Walked
7	Varsha	Day 1	Day 67	Evicted
8	Pandharinath	Day 1	Day 63	Evicted
9	Arbaz	Day 1	Day 56	Evicted
10	Sangram	Day 43	Day 55	Walked
11	Vaibhav	Day 1	Day 49	Evicted
12	Aarya	Day 1	Day 48	Ejected
13	Ghanshyam	Day 1	Day 41	Evicted
14	Irina	Day 1	Day 28	Evicted
15	Yogita	Day 1	Day 21	Evicted
16	Nikhil	Day 1	Day 21	Evicted
17	Purushottam	Day 1	Day 7	Evicted

== Housemates ==
=== Original entrants ===
- Varsha Usgaonkar - A Marathi and Hindi film and television actress. She has appeared in Gammat Jammat, Hamaal De Dhamaal, Saglikade Bombabomb, etc. She is also known for her role in TV series Sukh Mhanje Nakki Kay Asta!.
- Nikhil Damle - Television actor known for appearing in the Rama Raghav.
- Ankita Prabhu-Walawalkar- Social media influencer and YouTuber. She is known as Kokanheartedgirl.
- Pandharinath Kamble - A Marathi comedian. He did many roles in films and television. He is known for his appearance in Maharashtrachi Hasyajatra.
- Yogita Chavan - Television actress. She is known for her portrayal of Antara Khanvilkar in Jeev Majha Guntala.
- Janhavi Killekar - Television actress. She is known for her negative role in Bhagya Dile Tu Mala.
- Abhijeet Sawant - Singer. He was the winner of Indian Idol.
- Ghanshyam Darvade - Political commentator. He is also known as Chota Pudhari.
- Irina Rudakova - Russian model and yoga enthusiast. She was a cheerleader for the Indian Premier League.
- Nikki Tamboli - Film actress. She is predominantly working in Tamil and Telugu films. She was also the 2nd runner up of Bigg Boss 14.
- Vaibhav Chavan - Television actor. He is known for playing lead role in Man Jhala Bajind.
- Arbaz Patel - Reality television actor. He is the contestant of MTV Splitsvilla season 15.
- Aarya Jadhao - Rapper. She is known for being a contestant of MTV Hustle 2. She is widely known as QK.
- Purushottam Dada Patil - Kirtankar.
- Dhananjay Powar - Social media influencer, YouTuber and businessman.
- Suraj Chavan - Social media influencer.

=== Wild-Card entrants ===
- Sangram Chougule - Bodybuilder. He won the title of Mr. Universe in 2012 in the 85 kg category.

== Weekly summary ==
The main events in the Bigg Boss Marathi 5 house are summarised in the table below.

Week 1	Entrances	On the Grand Premiere, host Riteish Deshmukh welcomed new housemates and introduced them to all. Varsha Usgaonkar, Nikhil Damle, Ankita Prabhu-Walawalkar, Pandharinath Kamble, Yogita Chavan, Jahnavi Killekar, Abhijeet Sawant, Ghanshyam Darode, Nikki Tamboli, Vaibhav Chavan, Arbaz Patel, Aarya Jadhao, Purushottam Dada Patil, Dhananjay Powar and Suraj Chavan entered the house as the original housemates.
Week 1	Twists	On the Grand Premiere, host Riteish Deshmukh announced that housemates have to buy facilities in house for that they have to go through dilemma in which they need to select between BB currency and a personal luxury.: Housemate / Selection; Varsha / No Duty Power Card; Nikhil / 10,000; Ankita / 10,000; Pandharinath / 10,000; Yogita / 10,000; Jahnavi / Single bed; Abhijeet / 10,000; Ghanshyam / 10,000; Irina / 10,000; Nikki / Coffee; Vaibhav / Chicken; Arbaz / 10,000; Aarya / 10,000; Purushottam / 10,000; Dhananjay / Mutton; Suraj / 10,000
Week 1	Twists	On Day 1, Bigg Boss asked all housemates to name 3 housemates by majority which they think are unable to make decisions. Housemates by majority named Suraj, Irina and Dhananjay. Later, Bigg Boss gave them power of making decision where they had to visit BB Hub and brought items for whole house by available BB Currency which was 1,10,000. Suraj, Irina and Dhananjay had to show to decision making ability in this as majority of housemates chose them for not to have it.: Item / Value / Brought / Item / Value / Brought; Bathroom, Toilet (per pair) / 7000 / check / Oil / 5000 / check; Double Bed (per bed) / 15000 / X mark / Spices / 3000 / check; Single Bed (per bed) / 15000 / X mark / Sugar / 3000 / check; Chicken Nuggets / 20000 / X mark / Salt / 3000 / check; Coffee / 20000 / X mark / Eggs / 5000 / check; Chicken / 20000 / X mark / Poha / 3000 / check; Mutton / 20000 / X mark / Semolina / 3000 / check; Fish / 20000 / X mark / Tea / 5000 / check; Icecream / 20000 / X mark / Milk / 5000 / check; Ghee / 20000 / X mark / Curd / 3000 / check; Butter / 20000 / X mark / Onion, tomato, potato / 5000 / check; Colddrinks / 20000 / X mark / Lady finger, bitter gourd / 2000 / check; Cookies + Chocolates / 20000 / X mark / Bottle gourd / 1000 / check; Flour / 5000 / check / Cabbage, cauliflower / 2000 / check; Rice / 5000 / check / Green beans, ivy gourd / 2000 / check; Red lentil / 5000 / check / Fenugreek leaves, black eyed beans / 2000 / check; Chickpea / 5000 / check / Green pea / 1000 / check; Green gram beans / 5000 / check / Lemon, green chillies, ginger, garlic / 1000 / check; Pigeon peas / 5000 / check / Coriander, curry leaves / 1000 / check; Black lentil / 5000 / check / Brinjal, capsicum green / 3000 / check; At the end, beds and luxury items were not brought in this as a result housemates have to sleep on floor for first week and they can't use any furniture or sofa to sleep while they also can't use beds for sitting purpose too or any other activity. Sleeping bags were provided by Bigg Boss to all housemates which would be only used for sleeping and daily after wake up song they have to keep in store room. As Jahnavi Killekar brought single bed in grand premiere, only she will have luxury of bed.
Week 1	Twists	On Day 7, host Riteish Deshmukh announced two teams of housemates in which all are contenders of captaincy. Each team has to name three housemates of whom contendership would be taken away for upcoming captaincy. BB Currency of 30,000 will be given away for each contender being cancelled from captaincy. Total 1,80,000 BB Currency was given to house for upcoming week's shopping from BB Hub.: Team A / Team B; Arbaz; Nikki; Vaibhav; Jahnavi; ~~Dhananjay~~; Ghanshyam; ~~Purushottam~~; ~~Yogita~~ / Ankita; Aarya; ~~Varsha~~; Pandharinath; Abhijeet; Irina; ~~Nikhil~~; ~~Suraj~~; Housemates struck off took away their captaincy contendership
Week 1	Captaincy Task	Task cancelled
Week 1	House Captain	None
Week 1	Nominations	Nominations chi Tof On Day 2, Bigg Boss called all housemates in garden area where nomination process took place. In nomination process, 3 housemates per round and 4 housemates in last round will be up against cannon of nominations. Other than those housemates will be up for grabbing flambeau. In each round after sound of bugle, whichever housemate gets first hand on drumstick would beat drum with it and get flambeau to lighten up the cannon. Flambeau holder would fire a cannon against one housemate from three up for it whom they want to nominate for eviction process. After nominating once, flambeau holder will pass it to another housemate who would get chance to nominate. Round will not end till one housemate from three is not nominated twice in same round. In last round, four were up among which two were supposed to get nominated.: Round / Housemates; 1 / Nikki; Abhijeet; Ankita; 2 / Yogita; Aarya; Jahnavi; 3 / Arbaz; Varsha; Ghanshyam; 4 / Nikhil; Purushottam; Vaibhav; 5 / Pandharinath; Dhananjay; Suraj; Irina; Housemates in red got nominated
Week 1	Nominations	Ankita, Yogita, Varsha, Purushottam, Suraj and Dhananjay were nominated for first week's weekend eviction process.
Week 1	Sponsored	On Day 0, Santoor gave their products as a hamper to every individual housemates upon entrance in house.; On Day 7, P.N.Gadgil and Sons Ltd. gifted ₹1,00,000 gift voucher to evicted contestant Purushottam Dada Patil for buying their special fashionable jewellery Gargi by PNG
Week 1	Punishments	On Day 2, Bigg Boss announced that all housemates can use beds but due to violation of rules of using beds Bigg Boss cancelled it. Also Bigg Boss took away remaining BB Currency which was 3000.; On Day 5, Bigg Boss penalized all housemates by taking away captaincy for first week for violation of rules such as non-use of mics, sleeping in day, use of beds, not speaking in marathi language, etc.
Week 1	Exits	On Day 7, Purushottam Dada Patil became the first housemate to be evicted.
Week 2	Twists	On Day 7, Bigg Boss gave permission to use beds until next shopping carried out in BB Hub. Also Bigg Boss gave personal 30,000 BB Currency to Aarya and Jahnavi for outperforming which they would use for their personal use and they have to secure their personal BB Currency.
Week 2	Twists	On Day 9, Bigg Boss opened up BB Hub for shopping. Firstly Jahnavi and Aarya were called as they were in for their 30,000 personal BB currency to buy for themselves and 2 housemates with whom they will share that item. They can only buy beds, toilets and luxury items only.: Housemate / Items / Value / Sharing with; Aarya / ~~Double Bed~~; Single Bed / ~~10000~~; 20000 / ~~Yogita~~ Nikhil and Varsha; Jahnavi / Double Bed; Chicken / 10000; 20000 / Arbaz and Vaibhav; As Aarya failed to give 10,000 BB currency, Double Bed taken by her was confiscated by Bigg Boss. Later, Bigg Boss announced a twist that housemates will be paired in 7 pairs to take items from BB Hub and each pair will receive 20,000 BB currency while captain will have 40,000 BB currency. Also Bigg Boss asked housemates to make order of pairs declared by him on the basis of decision taking ability to go in BB Hub for shopping as it will also have impact on their future in house.: Pair / Items / Value; Arbaz-Dhananjay / Oil; Rice / 10000; 10000; Jahnavi-Varsha / Onions; Pigeon peas / 10000; 10000; Pandharinath-Yogita / Eggs / 20000; Nikki-Ghanshyam / Potatoes; Tomatoes / 10000; 10000; Abhijeet-Aarya / Coriander, curry leaves, ginger, garlic, lemon, green chillies Flour / 10000; 10000; Vaibhav-Irina / Spices; Salt / 10000; 10000; Suraj-Nikhil / Bathroom, toilet (pair) / 20000; Ankita / Poha; Cabbage, cauliflower Bathroom, toilet (pair) / 10000; 10000; 20000
Week 2	Captaincy Task	Captaincy chi Bullet Train On Day 8, Bullet train with two egines with its lines-Green and Red was placed in garden area. After sound of horn captaincy contenders and non-captaincy contenders would race for both engine's motorman seat. After respective engines motorman take place, captaincy contenders would select their favourite line and sit in that bogey. Bigg Boss would announce from which line bullet train and number of captaincy contenders to be evicted in that round. Varsha would be moderating task alongside taking part in it. In last round, Bigg Boss announced twist that green line would be closed and only red will be open.: Round / No. to evict / Line to go / Motorman / Passengers; 1 / 3 / Green / Ankita / ~~Irina~~; ~~Jahnavi~~; ~~Arbaz~~; Vaibhav; 2 / 2 / Green / Vaibhav / ~~Ghanshyam~~; ~~Aarya~~; Ankita; 3 / 4 / Red / Yogita / ~~Pandharinath~~; ~~Nikki~~; ~~Abhijeet~~; ~~Vaibhav~~; Ankita; Housemates struck off were out from captaincy race
Week 2	House Captain	Ankita Prabhu-Walawalkar
Week 2	Nominations	On Day 9, pairs made by Bigg Boss for shopping from BB Hub will be up for nominations along with their taken items. Each pair and captain will nominate two pairs for eviction process on the basis of who discussed most should be placed above. At the end pairs which are nominated, items taken by them would be seized by Bigg Boss and only pairs which are safe their items will be up for use of house. Pairs have to agree on one decision while nominating other pairs.: Pair / Items; Arbaz-Dhananjay / Oil; Rice; Jahnavi-Varsha / Onions; Pigeon peas; Pandharinath-Yogita / ~~Eggs~~; Nikki-Ghanshyam / ~~Potatoes~~; ~~Tomatoes~~; Abhijeet-Aarya / Coriander, curry leaves, ginger, garlic, lemon, green chillies Flour; Vaibhav-Irina / Spices; Salt; Suraj-Nikhil / ~~Bathroom, toilet (pair)~~; Ankita / Poha; Cabbage, cauliflower Bathroom, toilet (pair); Pairs in red got nominated while items struck off were seized by Bigg Boss. Captain marked in green as she was safe and her taken items also.
Week 2	Nominations	Pandharinath, Yogita, Suraj, Nikhil, Nikki & Ghanshyam were nominated for second week's weekend eviction process.
Week 2	Tasks	Kalla TV On Day 10, Bigg Boss stated that there will be Kalla TV for houemates and its channel head will be Ghanshyam. On Kalla TV, two teams will perform and entertain. Ghanshyam as moderator would announce results and winning team will get to use bed and sugar-milk. Dhananjay from Team A and Ankita would host show with their style. Bigg Boss also gave head on competitions and their type of performance to perform.: Presentation / Team A member(s) / Team B member(s); Singing / Abhijeet / Aarya; Dance / Nikki-Arbaz / Vaibhav-Irina; Dance / Nikhil-Yogita / Jahnavi-Varsha; News / Suraj / Ankita; Comedy/Roast / Dhananjay / Pandharinath; Team Member in red lost while in green won that round. After task completion, both the teams by majority will decide whether channel head will get bed, sugar, milk or not. By majority, both teams decided to give faciliies of bed, sugar and milk to channel head Ghanshyam alongside winning team A. Captain Ankita will make sure of it there are not any violations.
Week 2	Tasks	Winner - Team A - Abhijeet, Nikki, Arbaz, Nikhil, Yogita, Suraj, Dhananjay
Week 2	Tasks	Failed - Team B - Aarya, Vaibhav, Irina, Jahnavi, Varsha, Ankita, Pandharinath
Week 2	Sponsored	On Day 8, new screen was installed in living area which will showcase photo of Ambuja Cement Captain of a house for each week.; On Day 10, Society sent in their tea in box along with cups named of each housemate.; On Day 12, as Rakha Bandhan was upcoming occasion where Brothers celebrates with their sisters to mark it Cadbury Celebrations show a clip of their product made custom to celebrate moments of it. Also, Cadbury Celebrations will send boxes to sisters of brothers who will share their experiences with sisters which will be customised made with experiences shared. Abhijeet and Suraj shared experiences and later 3 boxes were gifted for all house.; On Day 13, Mutual Funds gave coins of value 50 to each housemates as base and extra coin of value 50 to housemate for becoming house captain. All housemates got one coin of value of 50 except Captain Ankita who got two coin as she was captain. This coins will be placed in investment box of every housemate placed at Mutual Funds stand which was inaugurated by Captain Ankita in living area. Every housemate will give nominee for their in case they are evicted. Coins can be redemeed to get luxuries or facilities provided by Bigg Boss time to time.
Week 2	Activities	On Day 11, Bigg Boss sent chalks for Irina to learn marathi by using them for writing on black board placed in Kitchen and learning it.; On Day 14, Host Riteish Deshmukh announced that bathroom and toilet which was seized due to nomination of Suraj and Nikhil would be available to use for all housemates.
Week 2	Exits	No one was evicted as Colors Marathi channel got relaunched with new tagline "Navi Bharari, Unch Bharari" due to which nominated contestants were given chance for new start.
Week 3	Twists	On Day 16, Bigg Boss announced that BB Hub will be closed for this week. Instead of BB Hub, there would be new room which is Power Room. In this power room, power cards would be there which would be used for others by power card user. Firstly, Bigg Boss called second week's Tanta Ghar performers in Power Room who had individual 50,000 BB Currency. They had two power card which were No Duty Power Card and Vote to Save Power Card. Each power card was valued at 50,000 BB Currency so both of them can choose only one out of two for themselves. Both also can choose one power card for themselves.: Housemate / Power Card chosen / Used for; Arbaz / Vote to Save / Nikki; Abhijeet / Vote to Save / Pandharinath; As both used Vote to Save power card by which Arbaz saved Nikki and Abhijeet saved Pandharinath from nominations. Lastly, Bigg Boss announced that next member would be from BB Currency task winning team A where they had to choose one among them to go in Power Room. Team A chose Vaibhav and he had five power cards which were Nominate Someone, Replace Someone from Nomination, Remove Captaincy Contendership, Vote to Save Other, No Duty for other. Each power card was valued at 50,000 BB Currency and as Team A only had 55,000 BB Currency, Vaibhav only can buy one power card. Also if Vaibhav buy either of Nominate Someone or Replace Someone from Nomination, he can't use them for Nikki and Pandharinath as they are already saved.: Housemate / Power Card chosen / Used for; Vaibhav / Replace Someone from Nomination / Ghanshyam replaced by Abhijeet in nominations.
Week 3	Twists	On Day 16, Bigg Boss gave all items except luxury items and also declared that housemates can use all beds and bathrooms.
Week 3	Captaincy Task	French fries of Captaincy On Day 18, Bigg Boss sent french fries for captaincy contendership winner Team A. Team B will decide in each round rankings of Team A captaincy contenders and would award them french fries from seven to one. After deciding rankings, Team A captaincy contenders can secure more french fries from other ones. After end of round, two least number of french fries holder would be out from captaincy.: Round / Out; 1 / Ghanshyam; Yogita; 2 / Suraj; Nikhil; 3 / Jahnavi; Nikki
Week 3	Captaincy Task	Winner - Arbaz
Week 3	Captaincy Task	Failed - Nikki, Vaibhav, Irina, Jahnavi, Ghanshyam, Suraj
Week 3	House Captain	None
Week 3	Nominations	On Day 14, Host Riteish Deshmukh declared all safe from second week's eviction while he announced that previously nominated contestants would be carried forward for third week's nominations. All nominated contestants from second week were directly nominated for third week.; On Day 16, Bigg Boss brought twist with Power Room where by using power cards Arbaz saved Nikki and Abhijeet saved Pandharinath from nominations while Vaibhav saved Ghanshyam and nominated Abhijeet.
Week 3	Nominations	Suraj, Yogita, Nikhil and Abhijeet were nominated for third week's weekend eviction process.
Week 3	Tasks	Bigg Boss che Chhote Pahune On Day 15, Bigg Boss sent in two twin babies as guest in house as announced by Host Riteish Deshmukh in weekend episodes. There will be a task for BB Currency for which two teams would compete and get BB Currency for their team to buy facilities for week. This week BB Currency will be used only for winning team rather than for all house. 3,00,000 BB Currency will be up for grab where both teams can earn up to maximum 1,50,000 BB Currency at the end of task. For every mistake made by each team, their 5000 BB Currency would be cut down by their opponents. At the completion of task, whichever team has maximum BB Currency would get their currency. There would be in between sub tasks such as changing diapers on crying of baby and eating of given food by BB by one team member when baby laughs. Both babies would be in two different for sake of in between sub tasks that which team will do. Vaibhav from Team A and Aarya from Team B would moderate tasks from their respective teams while Captain Ankita has to decide in which team she would participate where she chose Team B.: Team A / Nikki; Arbaz; Vaibhav; Irina; Jahnavi; Ghanshyam; Suraj / Remaining BB Currency = 55000; Team B / Aarya; Abhijeet; Varsha; Dhananjay; Pandharinath; Nikhil; Yogita; Ankita / Remaining BB Currency = 15000
Week 3	Tasks	Winner - Team A - Nikki, Arbaz, Vaibhav, Irina, Jahnavi, Ghanshyam, Suraj
Week 3	Tasks	Failed - Team B - Aarya, Abhijeet, Varsha, Dhananjay, Pandharinath, Nikhil, Yogita, Ankita
Week 3	Tasks	BB Port On Day 17, a task was conducted for captaincy contenderships. There are two boats placed at BB Port respectively for both teams A and B. Each team will have some members who will drive their team boat while some will go to get pearls. Red boat will be for Team A and Blue boat will be for Team B. Task will be conducted in rounds where in each round teams has to get pearls from box placed at Main Door. Each team has to then fill in pearls in their given bags. Each bag has to be with minimum 10 pearls. After that bags has to be loaded on boats. Bags in respective team's boat has to be secured by their own responsibility. Varsha would be assessing the task and she can also participate by taking part in one of the team. After each round, assessor would count bags and whichever team has less bags loaded on boat has to take decision of leaving out number of members out of captaincy contendership announced by Bigg Boss. After completion of task, housmeates which are still in task would be the final candidates of captaincy.: Team A / Team B; Arbaz; Nikki; Jahnavi; Yogita; Nikhil; Ghanshyam; Suraj / Vaibhav; Aarya; Abhijeet; Ankita; Pandharinath; Dhananjay; Irina; Varsha; Round / No. to evict / Lost by / Left out; 1 / 3 / Team B / Varsha; Pandharinath; Ankita; 2 / 3 / Team B / No; As after round 2 Team A will have seven members and Team B with two members, Bigg Boss announced that task ends and Team A wins and their all members become captaincy contenders.
Week 3	Tasks	Winner - Team A - Arbaz, Nikki, Jahnavi, Yogita, Nikhil, Ghanshyam, Suraj
Week 3	Tasks	Failed - Team B - Vaibhav, Aarya, Abhijeet, Ankita, Pandharinath, Dhananjay, Irina, Varsha
Week 3	Sponsored	On Day 18, Mutual Funds gave coin of value 50 to Arbaz on becoming captain.; On Day 21, As Nikhil and Yogita came out of house they named nominee for their coin of value 50 to Dhananjay and Aarya respectively to transfer it in their Mutual Funds Investment Box.; On Day 21, P.N.Gadgil and Sons Ltd. gifted ₹1,00,000 gift voucher to evicted contestants Nikhil Damle and Yogita Chavan for buying their special fashionable jewellery Gargi by PNG
Week 3	Activities	On Day 19, after seeing unhuman behaviour and failing on moral grounds Bigg Boss gave activity of Maanus banayche karya in which housemates can talk on phone to their loved ones which are not in this world and express their feelings.; On Day 21, Host Riteish Deshmukh showed social media comments and it was for first time in Bigg Boss Marathi History where outside comments were shown to housemates.
Week 3	Exits	On Day 21, Nikhil Damle became the second housemate and Yogita Chavan became the third housemate to be evicted.
Week 4	Twists	On Day 23, Bigg Boss collected all groceries except fruits and also confiscated both bathrooms and toilets alongside stopped use of beds for housemates. Next Bigg Boss called Arbaz in dilemma room to decide whether he wants to choose 2,00,000 BB Currency for both teams in place of giving up his captaincy and immunity to any other housemate or to choose keeping his captaincy and let go all BB Currency. Arbaz chose 2,00,000 BB Currency and gave up his captaincy and immunity to Nikki. Nikki became new house captain and Arbaz took 2,00,000 BB Currency for housemates.
Week 4	Twists	On Day 23, Bigg Boss opened BB Hub in Garden Area where housemates had to buy items by majority from their 2,00,000 BB Currency.: Item / Value / Brought / Item / Value / Brought / Item / Value / Brought; Bathroom, Toilet (per pair) / 40000 / check / Chips / 40000 / X mark / Lady finger / 20000 / X mark; Double bed (per bed) / 20000 / X mark / Cheese / 40000 / X mark / Fenugreek leaves / 20000 / X mark; Single bed (per bed) / 40000 / X mark / Green gram beans / 20000 / X mark / Green beans / 20000 / X mark; Coffee / 40000 / X mark / Pigeon peas / 20000 / check / Green peas / 20000 / X mark; Chicken / 40000 / X mark / Red lentils / 20000 / X mark / Cabbage / 20000 / X mark; Mutton / 40000 / X mark / Yellow lentils / 20000 / X mark / Cauliflower / 20000 / X mark; Fish / 40000 / X mark / Spices / 20000 / check / Coriander, ginger, garlic, curry leaves, lemon, green chillies / 20000 / X mark; Icecream / 40000 / X mark / Sugar / 20000 / X mark / Eggs / 20000 / check; Ghee / 40000 / X mark / Salt / 20000 / check / Poha / 20000 / X mark; Butter / 40000 / X mark / Oil / 20000 / check / Semolina / 20000 / X mark; Colddrink / 40000 / X mark / Flour / 20000 / check / Curd / 20000 / X mark; Cookies / 40000 / X mark / Rice / 20000 / check / Milk / 20000 / X mark; Chocolates / 40000 / X mark / Onion / 20000 / check / Jaggery / 40000 / X mark; Honey / 40000 / X mark / Tomato / 20000 / X mark / Potato / 20000 / X mark; As housemates didn't buy any beds so they can't use any bed and as they brought just one bathroom and toilet, they can't use another one.
Week 4	House Captain	~~Arbaz Patel~~; Nikki Tamboli
Week 4	Nominations	On Day 24, Bigg Boss gave photos of each housemate to other housemate. In nomination process, whoever wants to nominate housemate of whose photo they have would need to press the buzzer first by racing first to it. By putting photo in fire, housemate can directly nominate the one they have.: Housemate / Photograph; Irina / Ghanshyam; Jahnavi / Aarya; Aarya / Irina; Arbaz / Pandharinath; Dhananjay / Arbaz; Ghanshyam / Abhijeet; Ankita / Suraj; Suraj / Varsha; Pandharinath / Jahnavi; Abhijeet / Vaibhav; Varsha / Ankita; Vaibhav / Dhananjay; Housemates in red got nominated
Week 4	Nominations	Aarya, Irina, Abhijeet and Vaibhav were nominated for fourth week's weekend eviction process.
Week 4	Tasks	Satyacha Panchanama On Day 22, Bigg Boss gave task to win BB Currency in which two teams would compete against each other. In this task, each member from both teams will go in Activity Area where Bigg Boss will give them one statement and they need to decide is it true or false. After deciding, opposing team would have option whether they agree or not agree by pressing respective colour buzzer with that opposing team member. If opposing team agrees then that team member would earn 20,000 BB Currency for team else would return with 0 BB Currency. After completion of task, whichever team has more BB Currency will win it.: Team A member / Statement / Agreement / BB currency won / Team B member / Statement / Agreement / BB currency won; Ghanshyam / $\top$ / No Disagree / 0 / Aarya / $\bot$ / No Disagree / 0; Jahnavi / $\bot$ / No Disagree / 0 / Pandharinath / $\top$ / No Disagree / 0; Irina / $\bot$ / No Disagree / 0 / Abhijeet / $\top$ / No Disagree / 0; Nikki / $\bot$ / No Disagree / 0 / Ankita / $\top$ / No Disagree / 0; Vaibhav / $\bot$ / No Disagree / 0 / Varsha / $\top$ / No Disagree / 0; Suraj / $\top$ / No Disagree / 0 / Dhananjay / $\top$ / No Disagree / 0; As both teams disagreed on each statement of their opponent team, neither team won any BB Currency.
Week 4	Tasks	Failed - Team A - Nikki, Ghanshyam, Jahnavi, Vaibhav, Irina, Suraj & Team B - Abhijeet, Ankita, Dhananjay, Pandharinath, Aarya, Varsha
Week 4	Sponsored	On Day 23, Cadbury Celebrations sent customised gift boxes to each female housemate made by their brothers on the occasion of Raksha Bandhan.; On Day 28, As Irina came out of house she named nominee for her coin of value 50 to Vaibhav to transfer it in his Mutual Funds Investment Box.; On Day 28, P.N.Gadgil and Sons Ltd. gifted ₹1,00,000 gift voucher to evicted contestant Irina Rudakova for buying their special fashionable jewellery Gargi by PNG
Week 4	Activities	On Day 23, host Riteish Deshmukh sent rakhis in house for all housemates to celebrate Raksha Bandhan.
Week 4	Punishments	On Day 28, host Riteish Deshmukh gave punishment to Jahnavi of being in jail for one week due to her actions throughout season. Jahnavi can only use bathroom toilet available in garden area while when living area blinds are closed, she can come in house but can't use any furniture or utensils from house. Jahnavi only can sit on floor while being in house. Jahnavi would be always in jail whenever garden area is open.
Week 4	Exits	On Day 28, Irina Rudakova became the fourth housemate to be evicted.
Week 5	Twists	On Day 29, Bigg Boss announced that due to occurrence of Headless in house housemates had to be in pairs for a week. Bigg Boss then announced pairs which will remain for a week.: No / Pair; 1 / Nikki-Abhijeet; 2 / Arbaz-Aarya; 3 / Jahnavi-Suraj; 4 / Vaibhav-Dhananjay; 5 / Pandharinath-Ghanshyam; 6 / Ankita-Varsha; Housemates had to be in pairs by belt provided. Housemates need to sleep where one partner sleeps except Suraj who can sleep anywhere as Jahnavi is in jail but from morning both need to be together. One partner can go to bathroom where another partner need to wait in bathroom area.
Week 5	Twists	On Day 31, Bigg Boss made available both toilets and bathrooms to housemates
Week 5	Twists	On Day 32, Bigg Boss opened BB Hub for captaincy contenders who were removed and earned 30000 BB Currency individually whereas they would have option of buying for house or for their team where they chose team. Dhananjay and Vaibhav from their collective 60,000 BB Currency brought following items for their Team A.: Item / Value / Brought / Item / Value / Brought / Item / Value / Brought; Double bed (per bed) / 10000 / X mark / Cheese / 20000 / X mark / Lady finger / 10000 / X mark; Single bed (per bed) / 20000 / X mark / Split black lentils / 10000 / X mark / Fenugreek leaves / 10000 / X mark; Coffee / 20000 / X mark / Green gram beans / 10000 / X mark / Green beans / 10000 / X mark; Chicken / 20000 / check / Pigeon peas / 10000 / check / Green peas / 10000 / X mark; Mutton / 20000 / X mark / Red lentils / 10000 / X mark / Cabbage / 10000 / X mark; Fish / 20000 / X mark / Yellow lentils / 10000 / X mark / Cauliflower / 10000 / X mark; Icecream / 20000 / X mark / Spices / 10000 / X mark / Coriander, ginger, garlic, curry leaves, lemon, green chillies / 10000 / X mark; Ghee / 20000 / X mark / Sugar / 10000 / X mark / Eggs / 10000 / X mark; Butter / 20000 / X mark / Salt / 10000 / X mark / Poha / 10000 / X mark; Colddrink / 20000 / X mark / Oil / 10000 / check / Semolina / 10000 / X mark; Cookies / 20000 / X mark / Flour / 10000 / X mark / Curd / 10000 / X mark; Chocolates / 20000 / X mark / Rice / 10000 / check / Milk / 10000 / X mark; Honey / 20000 / X mark / Onion / 10000 / check / Jaggery / 20000 / X mark; Chips / 20000 / X mark / Tomato / 10000 / X mark / Potato / 10000 / X mark; Aarya, Suraj, Ankita and Jahnavi from their collective 1,20,000 BB Currency brought following items for their Team B.: Item / Value / Brought / Item / Value / Brought / Item / Value / Brought; Double bed (per bed) / 10000 / check / Cheese / 20000 / X mark / Lady finger / 10000 / X mark; Single bed (per bed) / 20000 / X mark / Split black lentils / 10000 / X mark / Fenugreek leaves / 10000 / X mark; Coffee / 20000 / X mark / Green gram beans / 10000 / X mark / Green beans / 10000 / X mark; Chicken / 20000 / check / Pigeon peas / 10000 / X mark / Green peas / 10000 / X mark; Mutton / 20000 / X mark / Red lentils / 10000 / X mark / Cabbage / 10000 / X mark; Fish / 20000 / X mark / Yellow lentils / 10000 / X mark / Cauliflower / 10000 / X mark; Icecream / 20000 / X mark / Spices / 10000 / check / Coriander, ginger, garlic, curry leaves, lemon, green chillies / 10000 / X mark; Ghee / 20000 / X mark / Sugar / 10000 / check / Eggs / 10000 / check; Butter / 20000 / X mark / Salt / 10000 / X mark / Poha / 10000 / X mark; Colddrink / 20000 / X mark / Oil / 10000 / X mark / Semolina / 10000 / X mark; Cookies / 20000 / X mark / Flour / 10000 / check / Curd / 10000 / X mark; Chocolates / 20000 / X mark / Rice / 10000 / check / Milk / 10000 / check; Honey / 20000 / X mark / Onion / 10000 / X mark / Jaggery / 20000 / X mark; Chips / 20000 / X mark / Tomato / 10000 / check / Potato / 10000 / X mark
Week 5	Twists	On Day 35, host Riteish Deshmukh made free all partners from their belts.
Week 5	Captaincy Task	Munjya On Day 32, Bigg Boss called 7 captaincy contenders - Aarya, Jahnavi, Suraj, Varsha, Ankita, Vaibhav, Dhananjay in activity area where tree of Munjya was present. Captaincy contenders need to debate to in front of tree of Munjya on the point of immunity for themselves against others. In each round, 2 captaincy contenders would be taken out by majority of all captaincy contenders. Each housemate who is taken out of captaincy contendership will get 30,000 BB Currency which can they use for their team or house. In last round, Varsha, Jahnavi and Vaibhav couldn't take decision of whom to be captain by majority, Bigg Boss took votes of non-captaincy contenders and by their majority new captain was chosen.: Round / Evicted from Captaincy; 1 / Aarya; Dhananjay; 2 / Suraj; Ankita; 3 / Jahnavi; Vaibhav
Week 5	Captaincy Task	Winner - Varsha
Week 5	Captaincy Task	Failed - Aarya, Dhananjay, Suraj, Ankita, Jahnavi, Vaibhav
Week 5	House Captain	Nikki Tamboli
Week 5	Nominations	On Day 29, Housemates individually will come in activity area where they need to swap one pair from danger zone to safe zone other than self pair if it is in danger zone while one pair from safe zone to danger zone. After all housemates are done with their nominations, two pairs which are present in danger zone would be nominated for weekend's eviction process. As Captain Nikki started process, there was none in danger zone she had right to put two pairs in danger zone. Also Nikki would remain captain but as she had consumed immunity in former week, she will be also in nominations.
Week 5	Nominations	Varsha, Ankita, Nikki & Abhijeet were nominated for fifth week's weekend eviction process.
Week 5	Tasks	Maankapyacha Khajina On Day 31, Bigg Boss gave task for BB Currency to housemates divided in two teams - Team A and Team B which would consist of three pairs. In each round one player from each team's player will go in tunnel to get gold coins which are valued at 2000 BB Currency while other player from pair would wait outside and collect coins alongside safeguarding it from opponent team's player. At end of task, whichever team has more BB Currency will win task and get special right. For each round, Bigg Boss will announce moderator.: Round / Moderator of Team A / Team A pair / Collected gold coins / Moderator of Team B / Team B pair / Collected gold coins; 1 / Nikki / Vaibhav-Dhananjay / 0 / Jahnavi / Aarya-Arbaz / 0; 2 / Pandharinath / Nikki-Abhijeet / 21 / Aarya / Jahnavi-Suraj / 36; 3 / Dhananjay / Pandharinath-Ghanshyam / 23 / Arbaz / Varsha-Ankita / 36; Total / Team A / / 44 / Team B / / 72; At the end, Team A won 88000 BB Currency while Team B won 144000 BB Currency. After end of task, Bigg Boss opened BB Hub where lost Team A would go for shopping first with 88000 BB Currency.: Item / Value / Brought / Item / Value / Brought / Item / Value / Brought; Double bed (per bed) / 20000 / X mark / Cheese / 40000 / X mark / Lady finger / 20000 / X mark; Single bed (per bed) / 40000 / X mark / Split black lentils / 20000 / X mark / Fenugreek leaves / 20000 / X mark; Coffee / 40000 / X mark / Green gram beans / 20000 / X mark / Green beans / 20000 / X mark; Chicken / 40000 / X mark / Pigeon peas / 20000 / X mark / Green peas / 20000 / X mark; Mutton / 40000 / X mark / Red lentils / 20000 / X mark / Cabbage / 20000 / X mark; Fish / 40000 / X mark / Yellow lentils / 20000 / X mark / Cauliflower / 20000 / X mark; Icecream / 40000 / X mark / Spices / 20000 / check / Coriander, ginger, garlic, curry leaves, lemon, green chillies / 20000 / X mark; Ghee / 40000 / X mark / Sugar / 20000 / X mark / Eggs / 20000 / check; Butter / 40000 / X mark / Salt / 20000 / check / Poha / 20000 / X mark; Colddrink / 40000 / X mark / Oil / 20000 / X mark / Semolina / 20000 / X mark; Cookies / 40000 / X mark / Flour / 20000 / X mark / Curd / 20000 / X mark; Chocolates / 40000 / X mark / Rice / 20000 / check / Milk / 20000 / X mark; Honey / 40000 / X mark / Onion / 20000 / X mark / Jaggery / 40000 / X mark; Chips / 40000 / X mark / Tomato / 20000 / X mark / Potato / 20000 / X mark; Later, Team B went shopping with 144000 BB Currency.: Item / Value / Brought / Item / Value / Brought / Item / Value / Brought; Double bed (per bed) / 20000 / X mark / Cheese / 40000 / X mark / Lady finger / 20000 / X mark; Single bed (per bed) / 40000 / X mark / Split black lentils / 20000 / X mark / Fenugreek leaves / 20000 / X mark; Coffee / 40000 / X mark / Green gram beans / 20000 / X mark / Green beans / 20000 / X mark; Chicken / 40000 / X mark / Pigeon peas / 20000 / check / Green peas / 20000 / X mark; Mutton / 40000 / X mark / Red lentils / 20000 / X mark / Cabbage / 20000 / X mark; Fish / 40000 / X mark / Yellow lentils / 20000 / X mark / Cauliflower / 20000 / X mark; Icecream / 40000 / X mark / Spices / 20000 / check / Coriander, ginger, garlic, curry leaves, lemon, green chillies / 20000 / X mark; Ghee / 40000 / X mark / Sugar / 20000 / X mark / Eggs / 20000 / check; Butter / 40000 / X mark / Salt / 20000 / check / Poha / 20000 / X mark; Colddrink / 40000 / X mark / Oil / 20000 / check / Semolina / 20000 / X mark; Cookies / 40000 / X mark / Flour / 20000 / X mark / Curd / 20000 / X mark; Chocolates / 40000 / X mark / Rice / 20000 / check / Milk / 20000 / X mark; Honey / 40000 / X mark / Onion / 20000 / check / Jaggery / 40000 / X mark; Chips / 40000 / X mark / Tomato / 20000 / X mark / Potato / 20000 / X mark; Later, as a winner of Team B got right to remove two pairs from Team A for Captaincy Contendership. Team B chose Nikki-Abhijeet and Pandharinath-Ghanshyam from Team A to remove from Captaincy Contendership.
Week 5	Tasks	Winner - Team B - Aarya, Arbaz, Jahnavi, Suraj, Varsha and Ankita
Week 5	Tasks	Failed - Team A - Vaibhav, Dhananjay, Nikki, Abhijeet, Pandharinath and Ghanshyam
Week 5	Punishments	On Day 30, Bigg Boss took away captaincy contendership of Arbaz as he violated rule of damage to Bigg Boss property.
Week 5	Activities	On Day 33, Bigg Boss announced that the punishment given to Jahnavi on Bhaucha Dhakka by host Riteish was over and told captain Varsha to release her from jail while warning Jahnavi not repeat mistakes due to which punishment was given.
Week 5	Exits	No one was evicted as voting lines were closed for a weekend's eviction process.
Week 6	Twists	On Day 37, Bigg Boss gave all groceries, permission to use all beds and bathroom-toilets.
Week 6	Captaincy Task	On Day 39, Bigg Boss gave task for captaincy where four contenders for it - Varsha, Ankita, Jahnavi, Suraj will compete against each other. In garden area, there will be umbrella placed in a white box. Non-captaincy contenders in each round will press buzzer and get one time right to vote to get out one captaincy contender from task. After pressing buzzer, non-captaincy contender will rain dance while captaincy contenders will have right to cancel out non-captaincy contender right of vote by bringing umbrella in red box. If umbrella doesn't get placed in red box, non-captaincy contender will have right to vote. Captaincy contender which gets two votes will get out from captaincy. Abhijeet will assess the task.: Round / Buzzer pressed by / Eligible to vote / Voted for; 1 / Dhananjay / Yes / Jahnavi; 2 / Arbaz / No / No; 3 / Vaibhav / No / No; 4 / Nikki / Yes / Jahnavi; 5 / Pandharinath / Yes / Varsha; 6 / Aarya / Yes / Ankita; 7 / Ghanshyam / Yes / Ankita; 8 / Abhijeet / Yes / Varsha; Housemates in red got out from captaincy by getting second vote
Week 6	Captaincy Task	Winner - Suraj
Week 6	Captaincy Task	Failed - Jahnavi, Ankita, Varsha
Week 6	House Captain	Varsha Usgaonkar
Week 6	Nominations	On Day 36, housemates had to nominate two other housemates by tearing up their discussion paper and throwing it into dustbin.
Week 6	Nominations	Ghanshyam, Aarya, Dhananjay, Suraj, Nikki, Arbaz & Abhijeet were nominated for sixth week's weekend eviction process.
Week 6	Tasks	BB Farm On Day 37, Bigg Boss gave a task to win special right. In this task, housemates would be divided in two teams - Team A and Team B. Both teams will collect as much milk as possible and at the end of each round whichever team has more milk in its container will win that round alongside securing 25000 BB Currency. After all rounds, whichever team has more BB Currency will win the task and get a special right. In task, there would be two boxes among which one box will have tap of milk where two members from each team will be present to collect milk in bowl while other box will be storage box where three members will be present who would store milk in bowl and securing it. Abhijeet from Team A and Varsha from Team B will be assessors who would oversee task from red marks. During first round, due to violence happened near milk tap, BIgg Boss cancelled round and asked both teams to remove one member from their team alongside only one member from each team will be present in box where tap is there. Team A removed Arbaz while Team B removed Vaibhav from their who would be overseeing task from balcony. After round 1, second round was also cancelled due to violation of rules leading to cancellation of task. Bigg Boss revealed that winning team would have got right to immune one member from their team for next week.: Team A / Team B; Nikki; Arbaz; Dhananjay; Pandharinath; Ghanshyam; Abhijeet / Jahnavi; Vaibhav; Ankita; Aarya; Suraj; Varsha; Round / Result; 1 / Cancelled; 2 / Cancelled
Week 6	Tasks	Failed - Team A - Nikki, Arbaz, Dhananjay, Pandharinath, Ghanshyam, Abhijeet & Team B - Jahnavi, Vaibhav, Ankita, Aarya, Suraj, Varsha
Week 6	Tasks	BB Bus Stop On Day 38, Bigg Boss gave task for getting captaincy contendership. In this task, there would be bus stop where all housemates would be in waiting line to get ticket to bus of captaincy. All housemates would stand outside red line. After buzzer goes off, all housemates would run to secure their seats at bus stop. In each round, Bigg Boss will announce number of housemates getting out. Outgoing member will be ticketchecker who will have right to swap any member who is out with member who is in. If more than two housemates get out then by majority of out members one among them will be chosen as ticketchecker.: Round / No. to go out / Remained out / Ticketchecker / Swapped / Swapped with; 1 / 1 / Nikki / No / No / No; 2 / 1 / Abhijeet / Nikki / No / No; 3 / 1 / Ghanshyam / Abhijeet / Yes / Arbaz; 4 / 2 / Jahnavi; Varsha / Arbaz / Yes / Pandharinath; Ghanshyam; 5 / 2 / Ankita; Suraj / Ghanshyam / Yes / Dhananjay; Aarya; 6 / 1 / Varsha / Aarya / Yes / Vaibhav; Housemates in red got out from captaincy contendership
Week 6	Tasks	Winner - Varsha, Ankita, Jahnavi, Suraj
Week 6	Tasks	Failed - Nikki, Abhijeet, Arbaz, Pandharinath, Ghanshyam, Dhananjay, Aarya, Vaibhav
Week 6	Sponsored	On Day 39, Mutual Funds gave coin of value 50 to Suraj on becoming captain.; On Day 41, As Ghanshyam came out of house he named nominee for his coin of value 50 to Suraj to transfer it in his Mutual Funds Investment Box.; On Day 41, P.N.Gadgil and Sons Ltd. gifted ₹1,00,000 gift voucher to evicted contestant Ghanshyam Darode for buying their special fashionable jewellery Gargi by PNG
Week 6	Punishments	On Day 41, host Riteish gave punishment to Nikki that she can't become house captain for remaining season alongside that she can't get immunity for remaining season. Also host Riteish gave punishment to Nikki that she has to wash all the utensils without anyone's help for a week. If anyone helps her that housemate will be directly nominated by Bigg Boss or if she fails do her duty then Nikki will be directly nominated by Bigg Boss.
Week 6	Exits	On Day 41, Ghanshyam Darode became the fifth housemate to be evicted.
Week 7	Entrances	On Day 43, Sangram Chougule entered the house as the wild-card entrant. Before entering house, host Riteish Deshmukh welcomed him and introduced to all on Day 42.
Week 7	Twists	Jadui Vihir On Day 43, Bigg Boss announced that this week there won't be any chance to win BB Currency instead of it housemates can earn all groceries, beds, bathrooms and toilets. There would be process where new entrant Sangram will conduct and he will have each pair ahead of him where he has to push minimum one housmeate out of two into swimming pool which is known as Jadui Vihir. He can also push both housemates. Whoever he pushes has to eat only boiled food throughout week alongside can't use any bed and also they can't use any furniture while those who are not pushed can use all groceries, beds, bathrooms and toilets.: Round / Housemates; 1 / Pandharinath; Arbaz; 2 / Suraj; Vaibhav; 3 / Aarya; Jahnavi; 4 / Ankita; Varsha; 5 / Dhananjay; Nikki; Abhijeet; Housemates in red were pushed in Jadui Vihir.
Week 7	Twists	On Day 43, Bigg Boss sent luxury items for housemates as new housemate came in house. Luxury items were only meant for housemates who were not pushed in swimming pool.
Week 7	Twists	On Day 47, Bigg Boss made available beds, furniture and normal food by cancelling earlier decision of not allowing it to housemates who were pushed in swimming pool. Bigg Boss clarified this decision was taken by taking in consideration that every one in Maharashtra can't afford two time meal and to make realize housemates regarding awareness of food.
Week 7	Twists	Naach Gaanyacha Kalla On Day 48, host Riteish Deshmukh gave task to housemates who were split in teams to earn 50,000 BB Currency for winning team to buy luxury items. Housmemates will go one on one against each other where whoever first pick prop from table which is related to song which is played.: Team A / Team B; Varsha; Jahnavi; Arbaz; Suraj; Pandharinath / Nikki; Ankita; Vaibhav; Abhijeet; Sangram; Dhananjay; Round / Team A player / Points / Team B player / Points; 1 / Arbaz / 1 / Nikki / 1; 2 / Jahnavi / 1 / Abhijeet / 2; 3 / Pandharinath / 0 / Vaibhav / 1; 4 / Varsha / 2 / Dhananjay / 0; Total / Team A / 4 / Team B / 4; As both teams got tied, BB Currency was split into 25,000 to each team.
Week 7	Captaincy Task	On Day 46, Bigg Boss gave task for captaincy to contenders Arbaz, Vaibhav, Dhananjay, Varsha & Suraj. Diamonds are kept in different areas of house. In each round, buzzer will go off in any area of house and whichever housemate will pick diamond in that area will have right to go in activity area where Magical Book is kept. Housemate who gets diamond will then write name of one captaincy contender in magical book of whom they want to take out from captaincy.: Round / Picked by / Evicted; 1 / Jahnavi / Arbaz; 2 / Vaibhav / Suraj; As physical violence was erupted between Nikki and Aarya during task, Bigg Boss cancelled task.
Week 7	Captaincy Task	Task Cancelled
Week 7	House Captain	Suraj Chavan
Week 7	Nominations	Jadui Diva On Day 44, opportunity for immunity was given to housemates. Each housemate will have one photograph of other housemate hanging in their neck. Housemates need to keep magical lamp on magical stone in each round by racing towards it while minimum one housemate would be nominated in each round. At the end, whoever housemates' magical lamp isn't placed on magical stone will be nominated. In each round, Bigg Boss will announce slots open at Magical Stone. Sangram would assess the process. During process as Ankita and Dhananjay didn't have reason according to criteria to nominate Jahnavi and Abhijeet respectively, Bigg Boss cancelled those rounds while Bigg Boss announced that in next round of those two housemates will be nominated. During round three, Abhijeet, Aarya and Vaibhav didn't came to conclusion on whom to get one slot on magical stone, Bigg Boss nominated all of three housemates of whom they photograph had.: Round / Slots / Remained out / Nominated; 1 / 9 / Arbaz / Varsha; 2 / 8 / Ankita / Cancelled; 3 / 7 / Abhijeet; Aarya; Vaibhav / Aarya; Vaibhav; Ankita; 4 / 5 / Dhananjay / Cancelled; 5 / 4 / Dhananjay; Jahnavi / Abhijeet; Nikki; Housemates in red were nominated.
Week 7	Nominations	Varsha, Aarya, Vaibhav, Ankita, Abhijeet and Nikki were nominated for seventh week's weekend eviction process.
Week 7	Tasks	Jadui Topi On Day 45, Bigg Boss gave task to get captaincy contendership for housemates. During task, in each round by racing towards and whoever presses buzzer would become Magical Rabbit who will have right to enter Magical Cap where they would have right to select hats of whom in that round wants to eliminate from captaincy contendership. Meanwhile, housemates from both teams will fill sacks and hook them with name written from opposing team of whom they want to make out. Abhijeet and Nikki would assess task while participating in it. Nikki as a punishment on Bhaucha Dhakka can't become captain.: Team A / Team B; Nikki; Arbaz; Vaibhav; Dhananjay; Varsha; Suraj / Abhijeet; Jahnavi; Sangram; Pandharinath; Ankita; Aarya; Round / Rabbit / No. to out / Out; 1 / Arbaz / 2 / Abhijeet; Sangram; 2 / Arbaz / 2 / Aarya; Jahnavi; 3 / Arbaz / 2 / Ankita; Pandharinath
Week 7	Tasks	Winner - Team A - Arbaz, Vaibhav, Dhananjay, Varsha, Suraj
Week 7	Tasks	Failed - Team B - Abhijeet, Sangram, Aarya, Jahnavi, Ankita, Pandharinath
Week 7	Sponsored	On Day 45, Mutual Funds gave coin of value 50 and investment box to Sangram as a new entrant to house.; On Day 47, Mutual Funds gave opportunity of redeeming coins to most valued housemate for choosing one luxury item out of cake, biryani and pizza each placed at 100 points. As Suraj was most valued with 150 points, he declined it.; On Day 47, Haier installed their products QD - Mini LED TV, Vogue Series Refrigerator and Microwave in house.; On Day 47, Comfort gave stage to all housemates where they would come one by one and tell interesting stories about their comfort in house. After completion, each housemate got hamper by Comfort.; On Day 48, As Vaibhav came out of house split his two coins of value 50 each to Arbaz and Jahnavi respectively to transfer it in their Mutual Funds Investment Box.; On Day 48, P.N.Gadgil and Sons Ltd. gifted ₹1,00,000 gift voucher to evicted contestant Vaibhav Chavan for buying their special fashionable jewellery Gargi by PNG.
Week 7	Punishments	On Day 44, Bigg Boss took away all luxury items as it was used and stolen by housemates who were pushed in swimming pool.; On Day 46, Bigg Boss gave punishments of jail to Aarya as she slapped Nikki after later provoked her. Also Bigg Boss told to Aarya that decision of her would be taken on Bhaucha Dhakka. Bigg Boss gave responsibility to last captain Suraj of maintaining Aarya in jail and keeping key with him.
Week 7	Exits	On Day 48, Aarya Jadhao became the sixth housemate to be evicted after she was expelled from house due to physical violence.
Week 7	Exits	On Day 48, Vaibhav Chavan became the seventh housemate to be evicted.
Week 8	Twists	On Day 51, Bigg Boss stopped supply of gas while announced that beds, groceries and bathrooms will be available for free but gas services would be resumed after housemates earn BB Currency and that BB Currency will decide that how much duration would be gas services given to housemates for a week. Housemates would be paired up for each round. A full tank of water is kept in garden area. For each round, Bigg Boss will announce pair for round while also announcing roles of individual housemate in pair for that round. In a pair, one will act and tell other housemate the animal or bird which is given in picture. Like this there will three images of three different animals/birds. After identifying each animal/word, other one will go to activity area and bring that animal/bird representation. After collecting all three, fourth picture will be revealed and first housemate will enact and tell the positions of animals/birds on stage. While doing all this, water will continue to flow and it can be stopped after all things are done right. After completion, according to water level moderator will measure it and tell above which mark is the water level and according to it BB Currency will be allocated to that. For example, if water level is above 20 mark then 20,000 BB Currency while if it is below 10 mark and above 0 then 0 BB Currency will be given.: Round / Enactor / Guesser / Moderator / BB Currency; 1 / Pandharinath / Sangram / Ankita / 20,000; 2 / Varsha / Dhananjay / Ankita / 30,000; 2 / Jahnavi / Arbaz / Ankita / 0; 4 / Nikki / Abhijeet / Ankita / 20,000; 5 / Ankita / Suraj / Abhijeet / 0; All housemates in total earned 80,000 BB Currency. Bigg Boss set price of gas at 10,000 BB Currency per 1 hour. As there was 80,000 BB Currency, housemates got 8 hours of gas services for a week. Bigg Boss sent Bhopu by sounding which and writing on blackboard "Gas Start" will mark start of gas services while by sounding Bhopu again and writing on blackboard "Gas Close" will mark stoppage of gas services. If housemates uses gas without notifying then Bigg Boss will deduct double the time they had used it.
Week 8	Twists	On Day 51, Bigg Boss gave chance to buy luxury items to housmemates and as per host Riteish Deshmukh's request Bigg Boss kept them at modest rates to buy. Bigg Boss gave chance to both teams either they can shop their teams or for whole house among which housemates chose for whole house from overall 50,000 BB Currency.: Item / Value / Brought; Coffee / 10000 / check; Colddrinks / 10000 / X mark; Butter / 5000 / X mark; Cheese / 5000 / X mark; Ghee / 5000 / check; Chocolates / 10000 / check; Cookies / 5000 / check; Icecream / 5000 / check; Honey / 5000 / X mark; Jaggery / 5000 / X mark; Chips / 5000 / check
Week 8	Twists	On Day 53, Sangram and Abhijeet were advised medically to take care of hand so they won't do any duty until Bigg Boss' orders.
Week 8	Twists	On Day 54, Bigg Boss removed all restrictions on use of gas services while 03:35:31 hours were remaining.
Week 8	Captaincy Task	On Day 53, Bigg Boss gave task for captaincy to Arbaz, Varsha, Dhananjay and Suraj. All four captaincy contenders will have jar full of water. They also have been given some glass with it. Other housemates are given Jungle Currency for buying glass of water. After hearing chirping of birds, non-captaincy contenders need to run and press buzzer. Whoever presses buzzer first would decide rates of glass of water for each captaincy contender. Rates won't be same for two captaincy contenders. Whichever captaincy contender will have less Jungle Currency would get out from Captaincy and won't take part in further rounds. Captaincy contenders will take care of their water jars. Abhijeet and Sangram will moderate task and won't participate in tasks due to medical reasons. Every housemate got 20,000 Jugle Currency.: Round / Buzzer pressed by / Rates / Rates assigned to / Jungle Currency earned / Eliminated; 1 / Nikki / 500; 300; 200; 100 / Arbaz; Varsha; Suraj; Dhananjay / 4000; 600; 0; 100 / Suraj; 2 / Nikki / 300; 200; 100 / Arbaz; Varsha; Dhananjay / 1800; 1600; 1500 / Dhananjay; 3 / Nikki / 200; 100 / Arbaz; Varsha / Varsha / 800; 100
Week 8	Captaincy Task	Winner - Arbaz
Week 8	Captaincy Task	Failed - Suraj, Dhananjay and Varsha
Week 8	House Captain	None
Week 8	Nominations	On Day 50, Bigg Boss gave nomination process to two teams where they need to get more number of hunter's gun. Winner team will be safe while loser team will be nominated. Bigg Boss will announce one name from both teams where team a member will be in red box while team b member will be in blue box. Moderator will be assigned for that round while after roar of tiger whichever team member gets first hunter's gun and gets back to self box will win. Winner for each round is mandatory while whichever team has more number of points will be safe.: Team A / Team B; Arbaz; Jahnavi; Suraj; Varsha; Nikki / Abhijeet; Sangram; Dhananjay; Pandharinath; Ankita; Round / Team A member / Team B member / Moderator A / Moderator B / Winner; 1 / Nikki / Ankita / Varsha / Dhananjay / Nikki; 2 / Varsha / Dhananjay / Nikki / Ankita / Dhananjay; 3 / Arbaz / Pandharinath / Suraj / Abhijeet / Arbaz; 4 / Jahnavi / Abhijeet / Arbaz / Pandharinath / Abhijeet; 5 / Suraj / Sangram / Varsha / Abhijeet / Sangram
Week 8	Nominations	Nikki, Arbaz, Jahnavi, Varsha and Suraj were nominated for eighth week's weekend eviction process.
Week 8	Tasks	On Day 52, Bigg Boss gave task to get captaincy contendership. Bigg Boss split housemates into two teams - Team A and Team B. Both teams will name two members who would participate in that round who would be waiting for egg outside white box at main gate from where it will come. There will be nest of all captaincy contenders except Nikki who is out due to punishment given on Bhaucha Dhakka. Whichever housemate had to be emoved from captaincy contendership, egg should be kept in that housemate's nest. At end, whichever housemate's nest won't have any egg would become captaincy contender. Two members from previous round can't be repeated for next round.: Team A / Team B; Arbaz; Varsha; Suraj; Nikki; Dhananjay / Abhijeet; Ankita; Sangram; Jahnavi; Pandharinath; Round / Team A members / Team B members / Moderator A / Moderator B / Egg kept in; 1 / Arbaz; Nikki / Sangram; Jahnavi / Dhananjay / Abhijeet / Ankita; Pandharinath; 2 / Dhananjay; Suraj / Ankita; Abhijeet / Varsha / Pandharinath / Janhavi; Sangram; 3 / Arbaz; Varsha / Sangram; Pandharinath / Nikki / Jahnavi / Abhijeet
Week 8	Tasks	Winner - Team A - Suraj, Varsha, Dhananjay and Arbaz
Week 8	Tasks	Failed - Team B - Ankita, Pandharinath, Janhavi, Sangram and Abhijeet
Week 8	Sponsored	On Day 53, Comfort gave task where housemates have to prepare mutually jingle. At the end, gift hamper will be given to them.; On Day 53, Mutual Funds gave coin of value 50 to Arbaz on becoming captain.; On Day 54, Manforce gave task to housemates. In this task, pairs will be made of one female member and male member. Female member will stand aside a bowl and take out chits out of it and enact a flavour which is in that chit while male member will enter in swimming pool and guess it. After guessing the flavour, male member will take that flavour's representation from pool and put it in bowl. There will be three flavours in total. Whichever pair complete task in less time would win it and get cash prize of ₹ 25,000 each. Abhijeet and Sangram will assess task and decide order of pairs.; Pair / Time (in secs.); Nikki-Arbaz / 44.69; Jahnavi-Suraj / 40.19; Ankita-Pandharinath / 32.25; Varsha-Dhananjay / 45.60; Ankita and Pandharinath won the task and got cash prize of ₹ 25,000 each.: On Day 56, Mutual Funds gave chance to housemates to redeem their coins in investment box and talk to their family member on video call. First preference will be given to housemate with highest points and if that housemate rejects then next housemate with highest points will have chance. If there are housemates tied on same points and they want to redeem points then housemates will decide by majority among them. All housemates rejected offer.; On Day 56, As Arbaz came out of house he named nominee for his coins of value 200 to Nikki to transfer it in her Mutual Funds Investment Box.
Week 8	Events	On Day 55, Bigg Boss announced that host Riteish Deshmukh will be unavailable due to filming overseas while in his absence Maharashtracha Dhakka was conducted where Dr. Nilesh Sable hosted it and journalists came in house to conduct press conference.
Week 8	Exits	On Day 55, Sangram Chougule became the eighth housemate to be evicted after he had to quit house due to injury to his wrist and back.
Week 8	Exits	On Day 56, Arbaz Patel became the ninth housemate to be evicted.
Week 9	Twists	On Day 57, Bigg Boss congratulated all housemates as this season became highest rated ever in history and became blockbuster season. Later, Bigg Boss announced that this season will be of 70 days not of 100 days and grand finale will be held on 6 October where one housemate will pick up coveted trophy of season.
Week 9	Twists	On Day 58, Bigg Boss gave all groceries, all beds to use, all bathrooms to use and gas in free.
Week 9	Twists	Mahachakravyuh On Day 59, Bigg Boss announced that ₹ 25,00,000 will be the prize money for the winning show. But it will be 0 but it can be won back by getting it from maze created by Bigg Boss. ₹ 6,25,000 will be up for each pair where one member will go blind in maze and another member will guide from activity area. There will be 15 flags of ₹ 20,000, 2 silver bricks of ₹ 50,000 in full route and one golden brick of ₹ 2,25,000 at exit.: Round / Guide / Blindfold / Won; 1 / Dhananjay / Jahnavi / 1,30,000; 2 / Abhijeet / Ankita / 3,15,000; 3 / Varsha / Nikki / 2,85,000; 4 / Pandharinath / Suraj / 1,30,000; Total / / / 8,60,000; Prize Money to winner of season was revised to 8,60,000.
Week 9	House Captain	~~Arbaz Patel~~; None
Week 9	Nominations	On Day 57, Bigg Boss nominated all housemates for weekend's eviction process while Bigg Boss announced two teams - Team A and Team B whose members will show audience whom two to target from opponent team of their. Whoever they want to target would be called at target board and in middle of it will paint cross on their face.: Team A / Team B; Nikki; Abhijeet; Suraj; Varsha / Ankita; Dhananjay; Pandharinath; Jahnavi
Week 9	Nominations	Abhijeet, Ankita, Dhananjay, Jahnavi, Nikki, Pandharinath, Suraj and Varsha were nominated for ninth week's weekend eviction process.
Week 9	Tasks	BB Lagori On Day 58, Bigg Boss gave task for decision of duties. Task will be contested in two teams. In each round, one member from both teams will take part in a game where they need to setup Lagori as shown on screen and also securing it will be personal responsibility of that member. Whichever team wins task will be owners and won't do any duty of house for week while losing team will be tell workers where they have to do each and every duty of house along with personal work of winning team members for a week. If any member from one of a team sets up correct lagori and keeps it safe until round ends will win 1 point for team.: Team A / Team B; Nikki; Suraj; Varsha; Dhananjay / Jahnavi; Ankita; Pandharinath; Abhijeet; Round / Team A member / Team B member / Moderator A / Moderator B / Result; 1 / Nikki / Ankita / Dhananjay / Abhijeet / Draw; 2 / Dhananjay / Pandharinath / Nikki / Ankita / Draw; 3 / Suraj / Jahnavi / Dhananjay / Pandharinath / Suraj Won; 4 / Varsha / Ankita / Dhananjay / Jahnavi / Draw; Abhijeet had injury to his hand and chose Ankita to play in his place.
Week 9	Tasks	Winner - Team A - Nikki, Suraj, Varsha, Dhananjay
Week 9	Tasks	Failed - Team B - Jahnavi, Ankita, Pandharinath, Abhijeet
Week 9	Sponsored	On Day 61, Santoor gave a task Young Dikho with Santoor to female housemates where they have to perform ramp walk by getting prepared with Santoor products and accessories. Before ramp walk, ad was shown. After ramp walk, female housemate will be questioned by on male housemate. Male housemates will judge the show and declare winner. Jahnavi Killekar was announced as winner of this task.; On Day 61, Ching's Chinese gave a cooking classes to housmemates where housemates who doesn't know cooking will perform. Gas station is there in garden area. Two pairs will perform this where one member from pair will guide and another will perform cooking duty. Ankita-Pandharinath will be first pair who will make Schezwan Fried Rice with Ching's Chinese Schezwan Fried Rice Masala while Jahnavi- Dhananjay will be second pair who will make Hakka Noodles with Ching's Chinese Hakka Noodles Masala.; On Day 63, As Pandharinath came out of house he named nominee for his coin of value 50 to Suraj to transfer it in his Mutual Funds Investment Box.; On Day 63, P.N.Gadgil and Sons Ltd. gifted ₹1,00,000 gift voucher to evicted contestant Pandharinath Kamble for buying their special fashionable jewellery Gargi by PNG
Week 9	Events	On Day 60 & 61, Bigg Boss played freeze-release with housemates where housemates met their family members in two days.
Week 9	Exits	On Day 63, Pandharinath Kamble became the tenth housemate to be evicted.
Week 10	Twists	On Grand Finale, host Riteish Deshmukh entered house with offer of money to housemates. Whichever housemate chooses to get ₹ 700,000 money for quitting game and taking away the money bag. Later, as no one chose host added ₹ 200,000 to it and gave last chance to top 6 to hit buzzer else name from envelope will be revealed who has got least votes. As Jahnavi Killekar hit buzzer, she quit thegame with ₹ 900,000 and became 5th Runner-up.
Week 10	Ticket to Finale Task	On Day 64, Ticket to Finale task was conducted between two contenders Nikki and Suraj. In this task, both have to take ring along a rod from start to end where for each time ring touch rod would penalize 30 seconds in time they have taken to complete this duration.: Round / Contender / Time Taken (in mins.); 1 / Nikki / 34:47; 2 / Suraj / 53:35
Week 10	Ticket to Finale Task	Winner - Nikki
Week 10	Ticket to Finale Task	Failed - Suraj
Week 10	Nominations	On Day 64, As Nikki won Ticket to Finale all other housemates were nominated for tenth week's weekend eviction process by Bigg Boss.
Week 10	Nominations	Abhijeet, Ankita, Dhananjay, Jahnavi, Suraj and Varsha were nominated for tenth week's midweek eviction process.
Week 10	Tasks	On Day 64, Bigg Boss announced that lost prize money which was ₹ 16,40,000 can be earned back through Ticket to Finale. Task would be performed in two parts where first part will be - ₹ 16,40,000 has been divided in 6 parts which are 600000, 400000, 300000, 200000, 100000, 40000. Housemates would give this value by majority to each other than Nikki who is already Ticket to Finale contender.: Value / Housemate; 600,000 / Suraj; 400,000 / Varsha; 300,000 / Abhijeet; 200,000 / Ankita; 100,000 / Dhananjay; 40,000 / Jahnavi; Second part of task was each housemate had to collect maximum flags in less time by roaming in children's car. Whichever housemate wins this task, that housemate's value will be added to prize money and also will become ticket to finale contender. Nikki would be moderator of task.: Housemate / Flags / Time (in mins.); Ankita / 19 / 04:01; Dhananjay / 18 / 04:46; Varsha / 19 / 06:34; Suraj / 20 / 04:04; Jahnavi / 19 / 04:10; Abhijeet / 18 / 03:56; As Suraj won task, his value 600,000 was added to prize money which became 1,460,000 and also Suraj became Ticket to Finale contender where he would compete with Nikki to win it.
Week 10	Tasks	Winner - Suraj
Week 10	Tasks	Failed - Ankita, Jahnavi, Varsha, Abhijeet and Dhananjay
Week 10	Sponsored	On Day 64, Mutual Funds points were shown to all housemates. Highest points earned member would get direct chance to get contendership of Ticket To Finale and need to redeem all poits. As Nikki had 300 points, she redeemed all points and became one contender of Ticket to Finale.; On Day 66, Gemini Cooking Oil brought Snack Cook-off Challenge where two teams will compete against each other and make snacks on their respective Gemini Cooking Stations. Team A would wear branded black apron and chef caps while Team B would wear branded white apron and chef caps. Nikki will judge over the cooking challenge and declare winning team who will get free supply of Gemini Cooking Oil for one year.; Team A / Team B; Jahnavi; Abhijeet; Suraj / Ankita; Dhananjay; Varsha; Team A - Jahnavi, Abhijeet and Suraj won challenge and got free supply of Gemini Cooking Oil for one year.: On Day 66, Comfort brought up a Comfort Sniff Challenge where they housemates in teams would identify clothes from bunch among which clothes are washed by Comfort Fabric Conditioner and which aren't by smelling them. Dhananjay would be moderator who would decide winning team which has guessed more number of correct clothes. Each team member would guess number of clothes from bunch which are written against their name.; Team A / Team B; Abhijeet; Nikki; Suraj / Varsha; Ankita; Jahnavi; As Team A guessed 23 correct clothes compared to Team B which guessed 22., Team A won the task and Team A members Abhijeet, Nikki, Suraj got gift hampers by Comfort.: On Day 67, P.N.Gadgil and Sons Ltd. gifted ₹100,000 gift voucher to evicted contestant Varsha Usgaonkar for buying their special fashionable jewellery Gargi by PNG.; On Day 68, Haier brought up a task where housemates will compete in teams. Each team will have Haier Washing Machine, sets of glass and coloured water. Both teams have to form a structure of glasses upto 6 levels upon washing machine which will be on and fill glasses with coloured water. Whichever team completes structure first and hit the buzzer after which it should be stabilized will win task and winning team member each will get Haier Robo Vacuum Cleaner worth ₹ 25,000.; Team A / Team B; Ankita; Nikki; Jahnavi / Abhijeet; Dhananjay; Suraj; As Team A hit the buzzer first and completed structure first won the task. Team A Members Ankita, Nikki, Jahnavi got Haier Robo Vacuum Cleaner worth ₹ 25,000.: On Day 68, Ching's Chinese brought up a challenge where two teams would make three items in which Ching's Schezwan Chutney would use as Dip, Spread and item in cooking respectively. Abhijeet and Suraj will be jusges who would taste all three items of both teams and rate them. Winning team would win Gift Hamper by Ching's Chinese.; Team A / Team B; Ankita; Dhananjay / Jahnavi; Nikki; As Team A scored 25 while Team B scored 24, Team A won challenge. Team A members Ankita and Dhananjay got Gift Hamper by Ching's Chinese.: On Grand Finale, P.N.Gadgil and Sons Ltd. gifted ₹100,000 gift voucher to 5th Runner-up Jahnavi Killekar for buying their special fashionable jewellery Gargi by PNG.; On Grand Finale, P.N.Gadgil and Sons Ltd. gifted ₹100,000 gift voucher to 4th Runner-up Ankita Prabhu-Walawalkar for buying their special fashionable jewellery Gargi by PNG.; On Grand Finale, P.N.Gadgil and Sons Ltd. gifted ₹100,000 gift voucher to 3rd Runner-up Dhananjay Powar for buying their special fashionable jewellery Gargi by PNG.; On Grand Finale, P.N.Gadgil and Sons Ltd. gifted ₹100,000 gift voucher to 2nd Runner-up Nikki Tamboli for buying their special fashionable jewellery Gargi by PNG.; On Grand Finale, P.N.Gadgil and Sons Ltd. gifted ₹100,000 gift voucher to 1st Runner-up Abhijeet Sawant for buying their special fashionable jewellery Gargi by PNG.; On Grand Finale, Tunwal E-Motors gifted electric scooty to Winner Suraj Chavhan for winning the season.; On Grand Finale, P.N.Gadgil and Sons Ltd. gifted ₹1,000,000 gift voucher to Winner Suraj Chavhan for buying their special fashionable jewellery Gargi by PNG.
Week 10	Events	On Day 65, Shiv Thakare entered house and announced that there would be Grand Celebrations held for all housemates. In this Grand Celebrations, host Shiv Thakare told that in history of Bigg Boss history for first time all housemates journey audio visual will be shown outside of house. All housemates were taken to The Red Bulb Studios where photoshoot was done of housemates and then host Shiv Thakare hosted Grand Celebrations with all fans in studio.; On Day 67, DJ Kratex entered house for Bigg Boss House Party.
Week 10	Exits	On Day 67, Varsha Usgaonkar became the eleventh housemate to be evicted.
Week 10	Day 70 Grand Finale	
Week 10	5th Runner Up	Jahnavi Killekar
Week 10	4th Runner Up	Ankita Prabhu-Walawalkar
Week 10	3rd Runner-up	Dhananjay Powar
Week 10	2nd Runner-up	Nikki Tamboli
Week 10	1st Runner-up	Abhijeet Sawant
Week 10	Winner	Suraj Chavhan

== Nominations table ==
	Week 1	Week 2	Week 3	Week 4	Week 5	Week 6	Week 7	Week 8	Week 9	Week 10 Grand Finale Week		
Nominees for Captaincy	None	Arbaz; Nikki; Vaibhav; Jahnavi; Ghanshyam; Ankita; Aarya; Pandharinath; Abhijeet; Irina	None	Arbaz; Nikki; Jahnavi; Yogita; Nikhil; Ghanshyam; Suraj	None	Aarya; Jahnavi; Suraj; Varsha; Ankita; Vaibhav; Dhananjay	Varsha; Ankita; Jahnavi; Suraj	Arbaz; Vaibhav; Dhananjay; Varsha; Suraj	Suraj; Nikki; Varsha; Arbaz	None		
House Captain	None	Ankita	None	~~Arbaz~~; Nikki	Nikki	Varsha	Suraj	None	~~Arbaz~~	None		
Captain's Nominations	None	Pandharinath-Yogita; Suraj-Nikhil	None	Not eligible	^{1}Vaibhav-Dhananjay; Jahnavi-Suraj (to evict)	Dhananjay; Suraj	Not eligible	None	None	None		
Vote to:	Evict		Power Card	Evict	Evict/Save	Evict	Evict/Save	Task	Evict	None	WIN	
Suraj	Not eligible	Pandharinath-Yogita; Nikki-Ghanshyam	Nominated	Not eligible	^{6}Vaibhav-Dhananjay (to save); Arbaz-Aarya (to evict)	Nikki; Ghanshyam	House; Captain	Lost	Jahnavi; Dhananjay	Nominated	Nominated	Winner (Day 70)
Abhijeet	Not eligible	Pandharinath-Yogita; Nikki-Ghanshyam	Pandharinath (to save); Swapped with Ghanshyam by Vaibhav	Vaibhav	^{11}Ankita-Varsha (to save); Vaibhav-Dhananjay (to evict)	Aarya; Ghanshyam	Aarya (to evict)	Won	Jahnavi; Pandharinath	Nominated	Nominated	1st Runner-up (Day 70)
Nikki	Varsha; Dhananjay	Abhijeet-Aarya; Suraj-Nikhil	Saved by Arbaz	House; Captain		Dhananjay; Aarya	Pandharinath (to save)	Lost	Jahnavi; Ankita	Ticket to Finale	Nominated	2nd Runner-up (Day 70)
Dhananjay	Not eligible	Pandharinath-Yogita; Suraj-Nikhil	Not eligible	Not eligible	^{4}Nikki-Abhijeet (to save); Pandharinath-Ghanshyam (to evict)	Ghanshyam; Aarya	Abhijeet (to evict)	Won	Varsha; Nikki	Nominated	Nominated	3rd Runner-up (Day 70)
Ankita	Not eligible	House; Captain	Not eligible	Not eligible	^{3}Jahnavi-Suraj (to save); Vaibhav-Dhananjay (to evict)	Ghanshyam; Suraj	Jahnavi (to save)	Won	Nikki; Suraj	Nominated	Nominated	4th Runner-up (Day 70)
Jahnavi	Ankita; Suraj	Pandharinath-Yogita; Suraj-Nikhil	Not eligible	Aarya	^{2}Vaibhav-Dhananjay (to save); Nikki-Abhijeet (to evict)	Ghanshyam; Suraj	Nikki (to evict)	Lost	Nikki; Abhijeet	Nominated	Nominated	Walked, 5th Runner-up (Day 70)
Varsha	Not eligible	Pandharinath-Yogita; Suraj-Nikhil	Not eligible	Not eligible	^{5}Pandharinath-Ghanshyam (to save); Nikki-Abhijeet (to evict)	House; Captain	Dhananjay (to save)	Lost	Dhananjay; Pandharinath	Nominated	Evicted (Day 67)	
Pandharinath	Not eligible	Suraj-Nikhil; Nikki-Ghanshyam	Saved by Abhijeet	Not eligible	^{7}Arbaz-Aarya (to save); Vaibhav-Dhananjay (to evict)	Arbaz; Ghanshyam	Arbaz (to save)	Won	Nikki; Varsha	Evicted (Day 63)		
Arbaz	Ankita; Yogita; Purushottam; Pandharinath	Pandharinath-Yogita; Suraj-Nikhil	Nikki (to save)	Not eligible	^{9}Vaibhav-Dhananjay (to save); Ankita-Varsha (to evict)	Aarya; Dhananjay	Varsha (to evict)	Lost	Evicted (Day 56)			
Sangram	Not In; House						Immuned	Won	Walked (Day 55)			
Vaibhav	Yogita; Varsha; Suraj	Pandharinath-Yogita; Suraj-Nikhil	Ghanshyam (to save); Abhijeet (to evict)	Not eligible	^{10}Pandharinath-Ghanshyam (to save); Nikki-Abhijeet (to evict)	Nikki; Aarya	Ankita (to evict)	Evicted (Day 48)				
Aarya	Purushottam	Pandharinath-Yogita; Nikki-Ghanshyam	Not eligible	Irina	^{8}Nikki-Abhijeet (to save); Pandharinath-Ghanshyam (to evict)	Abhijeet; Ghanshyam	Vaibhav (to evict)	Ejected (Day 48)				
Ghanshyam	Dhananjay	Abhijeet-Aarya; Suraj-Nikhil	Swapped with Abhijeet by Vaibhav	Abhijeet	^{12}Vaibhav-Dhananjay (to save); Ankita-Varsha (to evict)	Aarya; Dhananjay	Evicted (Day 41)					
Irina	Not eligible	Pandharinath-Yogita; Suraj-Nikhil	Not eligible	Not eligible	Evicted (Day 28)							
Yogita	Not eligible	Suraj-Nikhil; Nikki-Ghanshyam	Nominated	Evicted (Day 21)								
Nikhil	Not eligible	Pandharinath-Yogita; Nikki-Ghanshyam	Nominated	Evicted (Day 21)								
Purushottam	Not eligible	Evicted (Day 7)										
Notes	1	2	3, 4	5	6	7	8	9	10	11	12	
Nominated for eviction	Ankita; Yogita; Varsha; Purushottam; Suraj; Dhananjay	Pandharinath; Yogita; Suraj; Nikhil; Nikki; Ghanshyam	~~Pandharinath~~; Suraj; Yogita; Nikhil; ~~Nikki~~; ~~Ghanshyam~~; Abhijeet	Aarya; Irina; Abhijeet; Vaibhav	Varsha; Ankita; Nikki; Abhijeet	Ghanshyam; Aarya; Dhananjay; Suraj; Nikki; Arbaz; Abhijeet	Varsha; Aarya; Vaibhav; Ankita; Abhijeet; Nikki	Nikki; Arbaz; Jahnavi; Varsha; Suraj	Abhijeet; Ankita; Jahnavi; Dhananjay; Nikki; Pandharinath; Varsha; Suraj	Abhijeet; Ankita; Dhananjay; Jahnavi; Suraj; Varsha	Nikki; Abhijeet; Suraj; Jahnavi; Dhananjay; Ankita	
Ejected	None						Aarya	None	None			
Walked	None						None	Sangram	None			
Evicted	Purushottam	None	Nikhil	Irina	None	Ghanshyam	Vaibhav	Arbaz	Pandharinath	Varsha	Jahnavi	
Evicted	Purushottam	None	Nikhil	Irina	None	Ghanshyam	Vaibhav	Arbaz	Pandharinath	Varsha	Ankita	
Evicted	Purushottam	None	Nikhil	Irina	None	Ghanshyam	Vaibhav	Arbaz	Pandharinath	Varsha	Dhananjay	
Evicted	Purushottam	None	Yogita	Irina	None	Ghanshyam	Vaibhav	Arbaz	Pandharinath	Varsha	Nikki	
Evicted	Purushottam	None	Yogita	Irina	None	Ghanshyam	Vaibhav	Arbaz	Pandharinath	Varsha	Abhijeet	
Evicted	Purushottam	None	Yogita	Irina	None	Ghanshyam	Vaibhav	Arbaz	Pandharinath	Varsha	Suraj	

Color keys

indicates the House Captain.
indicates the nominees for house captaincy.
indicates that the Housemate was safe prior to nominations.
indicates that the Housemate was directly nominated for eviction before the regular nominations process.
indicates the winner.
indicates the first runner-up.
indicates the second runner-up.
indicates the third runner-up.
indicates the fourth runner-up.
indicates that the contestant has re-entered the house.
indicates that the contestant walked out of the show.
indicates that the contestant was ejected from the house.
indicates that the contestant was evicted.

Nomination notes

- ^1: On Day 2, every housemate had to win power of nomination by winning in particular round in which set of three housemates was against nomination among which one will be nominated. After nominating once, winner of round would allocate another housemate who would get power of nomination. In last round, set of four will be up amongst them two will be nominated.
- ^2: On Day 9, housemates would nominate two pairs for eviction in pair itself by coming on mutual decision.
- ^3: On Day 14, Host Riteish Deshmukh announced that there was no eviction in second week so all nominated contestants were carried forward and got directly nominated.
- ^4: On Day 16, Arbaz and Abhijeet got to use power cards where they chose Vote to Save Power Card while Vaibhav as chosen by winning team of weekly task got to use Replace Someone from Nominations Power Card.
- ^5: On Day 24, Photographs of each housemate was given to other housemate. Any housemate can directly nominate the other housemate of whose photo they have.
- ^6: On Day 29, Housemates individually will swap one pair from danger zone to safe zone other than self pair if it is in danger zone while one pair from safe zone to danger zone. After all housemates are done with their nominations, two pairs which are present in danger zone would be nominated As Captain Nikki started process, there was none in danger zone she had right to put two pairs in danger zone. Also Nikki would remain captain but as she had consumed immunity in former week, she will be also in nominations.
- ^7: On Day 36, housemates would nominate two housemates for eviction.
- ^8: On Day 44, Photographs of each housemate was given to other housemate. Any housemate who wants to immune the housemate of whom photo they had while they can also nominate them while from immunity by placing away their lamp on immunity stone.
- ^9: On Day 50, task was conducted in which housemates were divided in teams. Team whichever wins will be safe while team that loses task will be nominated.
- ^10: On Day 57, Bigg Boss nominated all housemates and later divided housemates in two teams where they had to target two housemates from opponent team.
- ^11: On Day 64, Nikki won Ticket to Finale and became first finalist while all other housemateswere nominated for midweek eviction process by Bigg Boss.
- ^12: On Day 67, Bigg Boss nominated all top 6 housemates for winning the season.

== Guest appearances ==
Week(s)	Day(s)	Guest(s)	Note(s)	Ref.
2	14	Akshay Kumar, Fardeen Khan, Vaani Kapoor, Taapsee Pannu, Ammy Virk, Aditya Seal and Pragya Jaiswal	To promote their film Khel Khel Mein.
3	21	Akshay Kelkar, Gayatri Datar and Payal Jadhav	To promote their TV series Abeer Gulal.
4	28	Roomani Khare, Ambar Ganpule and Shilpa Navalkar	To promote their TV series Durga
4	28	Kangana Ranaut and Shreyas Talpade	To promote their film Emergency
6	42	Salim Merchant, Saurabh Abhyankar, Karan Kanchan	To promote their song Morya
6	42	Dr. Utkarsh Shinde	To celebrate Ganeshotsav with housemates and give gifts to housemates.
6	42	Anita Date-Kelkar and Sandeep Pathak	To celebrate Ganeshotsav with housemates and promote their TV series Indrayani.
6	42	Sanmita Dhapte-Shinde and Akshaya Iyer	To celebrate Ganeshotsav by performing musical fest.
6	42	Santosh Chaudhari	To celebrate Ganeshotsav with housemates by performing in-house.
6	42	Prasenjit Kosambi and Ravindra Khomane	To celebrate Ganeshotsav with housemates by performing in-house.
8	55	Dr. Nilesh Sable	To entertain housemates, conduct Maharashtracha Dhakka with journalists and host Bhaucha Dhakka in absence of host
8	56	Dr. Nilesh Sable	To host Bhaucha Dhakka in absence of Riteish Deshmukh.
8	56	Ashok Saraf, Supriya Pilgaonkar, and Swapnil Joshi	To promote their film Navra Maza Navsacha 2
8	56	Sharad Upadhye	To entertain housemates by predicting their future
8	59	Manisha Usgaonkar	To meet her sister Varsha
8	59	Shilpa Sawant	To meet her husband Abhijeet
8	59	Kiran Killekar and Ishaan Killekar	To meet his wife and mother
8	59	Kalyani Powar	To meet her husband Dhananjay
8	60	Rutuja Walawalkar, Prajakta Walawalkar and Pramod Walawalkar	To meet their sister and daughter Ankita
8	60	Grishma Kamble	To meet her father Pandharinath
8	60	Pramila Tamboli and Digambar Tamboli	To meet their daughter Nikki
8	60	Suraj's sister and Aunt	To meet Suraj
9	62	Rakhi Sawant, Abhijeet Bichukale, and Anil Thatte	To entertain housemates in Freeze Release Task
9	63	Dr. Nilesh Sable	To host Bhaucha Dhakka in absence of Riteish Deshmukh
9	63	Prajakta Mali, Gashmeer Mahajani	To promote their film Phullwanti
9	63	Adinath Kothare, Subodh Bhave	To promote their film Paani
9	63	Suparna Shyam, Rohit Chavan, and Snehal Shidam	To entertain housemates
10	65	Shiv Thakare	To host Grand Celebrations
10	67	Krunal Ghorpade (DJ Kratex)	For BB House Party
10	68	Shashwati Pimplikar, Aishwarya Shete, Prajakta Parab, Aakanksha Gade and Vidisha Mhaskar	To promote their TV series Pinga Ga Pori Pinga
10	68	Amruta Khanvilkar and Amey Wagh	To promote their film Like Aani Subscribe
10	69	Varsha Usgaonkar, Pandharinath Kamble, Arbaz Patel, Vaibhav Chavan, Ghanshyam Darode, Irina Rudakova, Yogita Chavan, Nikhil Damle, Purushottam Dada Patil and Sangram Chougule	For get together with housemates
Grand Finale	70	Salman Khan	For congratulatory message to host Riteish Deshmukh and promote Bigg Boss 18
Grand Finale	70	Adinath Salvi	To predict future of finalists
Grand Finale	70	Pooja Kale	To promote her TV series Aai Tulja Bhavani
Grand Finale	70	Alia Bhatt, Vedang Raina and Vasan Bala	To promote their film Jigra & to carry out top 3 eviction
