= Balumamachya Navan Changbhala =

Indian Marathi mythological series

- Genre: Spirituality
- Based on: Balumama
- Written by: Santosh Ayachit
- Directed by: Nishant Surve
- Starring: See below
- Opening theme: "Balumamachya Navan Changbhala" by Saurabh Salunke
- Country of origin: India
- Original language: Marathi
- No. of episodes: 1848

Production
- Producer: Darshana Ayachit
- Camera setup: Multi-camera
- Running time: 22 minutes
- Production company: Sajiri Creations

Original release
- Network: Colors Marathi
- Release: 13 August 2018 – 28 July 2024

Balumamachya Navan Changbhala (transl. Good in the name of Balumama) is an Indian Marathi language TV series which aired on Colors Marathi. The show premiered from 13 August 2018 by replacing Tu Majha Saangaati. It stars Sumeet Pusavale in title role.

== Summary ==
Saint "Balumama" was born in Akkol, Belgaum district, into the Dhangar community. He has followers from Maharashtra, Karnataka, and Telangana. He would take care of his sheep. His sheep are recognized to be very sacred and auspicious. Balumama is believed to be one of Lord Mahadev's incarnations and he devoted his existence to help needy people.

== Cast ==
=== Main ===
- Prakash Dhotre as Elder Balumama
  - Sumeet Pusavale as Young Balumama
    - Samarth Patil as Child Balumama

=== Recurring ===
- Rohit Deshmukh as Mayappa, Balumama's father
- Ankita Panvelkar as Sundara, Balumama's mother
- Mayur Khandage as Panch
- Advait Kulkarni as Small Gundappa
  - Akshay Dandekar as Young Gundappa
- Sajari Ayachit as Small Satyavva
  - Komal More as Young Satyavva
- Akshay Tak as Tatya
- Chaitrali Rode as Tatya's wife
- Ashok Kangude as Manglu
- Vaibhav Rajendra as Bheema
- Meenakshi Rathod as Panch Bai
- Sanjana Kale as Narmada
- Bhagyashree Pawar as Lagamwa
- Bhausaheb Sonawane as Kaasha
- Sonali Salunke as Shanta
- Babasaheb Gaikwad as Raghu
- Ashish Wadde as Shejari Nigpaa
- Purshottam Wagh as Kariappa
- Prathamesh Jadhav as Mr. Patil
- Vijay Shejwal as Keshav Vaidya
- Namrata Sumiraj as Yamuna
- Vikram Gaikwad as Patil
- Akshay Dandekar as Gundappa
- Yashwant Suryavanshi as Balya
- Pratibha Vale as Nigpaa's mother-in-law
- Pallavi Patil as Shejarin Sakhu
- Amruta Uttarwar as Sakhutai
- Meghana Hoshing as Usha
- Mayur More as Sarkar Inamdar
- Surekha Kudachi as Akka

== Reception ==
It gained fifth position in Week 28 of 2019 with 3.4 TRP in Top 5 Marathi TV Shows.

=== Special episode (2 hours) ===
- 31 March 2019 (Balu helps Malappa)
