= Ramachaari (TV series) =

Indian Kannada language television drama series

- Genre: Drama
- Directed by: K S Ramji
- Starring: Rithvik Krupakar; Mouna Guddemane
- Opening theme: Namma Ramachaari
- Country of origin: India
- Original language: Kannada
- No. of episodes: 1000

Production
- Producer: K S Ramji
- Camera setup: Multi-camera
- Running time: 22 minutes

Original release
- Network: Colors Kannada
- Release: 31 January 2022 – 28 December 2025

Ramachaari was an Indian Kannada language television drama series aired on Colors Kannada and premiered on 31 January 2022. It stars Rithvik Krupakar, Mouna Guddemane, Mithun Tejasvi, Shankar Ashwath, Sirija, and Anjali Sudhakar.

== Plot ==
Ramachaari is a person hailing from a middle-class Brahmin family background. In the beginning episodes, it is shown that he goes for the 60th year Pooje, of a wealthy businessman, the father of an arrogant lady named Charulatha (aka Charu), who had met Ramachaari in a chance encounter when she drove her car so fast, while coming back home. But Ramachaari stepped over the car, enraging her and this triggered a sense of anger in her. Then, several incidents infuriate her more, eventually, they end up joining the same company (Arjuna Architects). Several days later, Charulatha's father compels his daughter to stay in Ramachaari's home, against her wishes. This enrages her more and decides to avenge her insult, thus ruins Ramachaari's sister's marriage, causing even more problems to his family. Later when Ramachaari is revealed about the truth, he goes to warn her. On the other hand, Charulatha's 3-month task of work experience almost comes to an end, thus demanding a "Performance Certificate", from her father, but from Ramachaari, not from the Company Manager where she works. Charulatha tries every trick in the book to forcefully get a certificate from Ramachaari, in order to become the CEO of her dad's company, but fails every time.

== Cast ==
=== Main ===
- Rithvik Krupakar as Ramachaari, Narayana and Janaki's younger son, Charu's husband, Shruthi's brother (dead)
- Mouna Guddemane as Charulatha, Ramachaari's wife, Jayashankar and Manyatha's daughter

=== Recurring ===
- Jhansi Kaverappa / Bhavana as Manyatha, Jayashankar's first wife and Charulatha's mother
- Anjali Sudhakar as Janaki, Ramachaari's mother
- Shankar Ashwath as Narayanachaari, Ramachaari's father
- Chi. Guru Dutt as Jayashankar, Charulatha's father
- Jayalakshmi as Ajjamma, Narayanachaari's mother, Ramachaari's grandmother.
- Sirija as Sharmila, Jayashankar's second wife and Charulatha's stepmother
- Punitha Gowda as Aparna, Ramachaari's sister-in-law
- Shree Bhavya
- Shruthi Purushottham
- MS Jahangir as Manager of a Business Company
- Sanjeev Jamadar
- Sushmitha
- Latha Girish as Deepa
- Nidhi Gowda
- Nisarga Appanna as Rukku
- Akshata Deshpande
- Bharath Chakravarthy
- Suresh Rai as Ashutosh Agarwal, a businessman
- Shwetha B as Narayana Shastri's Sister
- Puneeth Babu as Shashikanth Deshpande, Police Inspector
- Raju Talikote as Guest Appearance
- Balaraj as Narayana Shastri's sister's husband
- Aishwarya vinay as Vaishaka, Ramachari second sister-in-law

== Adaptations ==
Language	Title	Original release	Network(s)	Last aired	Notes
Kannada	Ramachaari ರಾಮಾಚಾರಿ	31 January 2022	Colors Kannada	28 December 2025	Original
Marathi	Rama Raghav रमा राघव	9 January 2023	Colors Marathi	27 July 2024	Remake
Bengali	Ramkrishna রামকৃষ্ণ	10 April 2023	Colors Bangla	21 July 2024	Remake

== Reception ==
Ramachaari received attention from Kannada television audiences during its run. Asianet Suvarna News described the series as popular and reported that it had reached a top position in the channel's TRP ratings, while also attributing part of its popularity to Rithvik Krupakar's performance as the title character. In 2023, the publication reported that the series had been liked by many viewers and had previously recorded a top TRP position.
