= Balumama =

Indian guru (1892–1966)

- Born: Ballappa; 3 October 1892; Akkol, Kingdom of Mysuru, British India
- Died: 4 September 1966 (aged 73); Adamapur, Kolhapur district, Maharashtra, India
- Resting place: Adamapur, Maharashtra
- Spouse: Satyavvadevi Balu Arabhave

Balumama Maharaj (born Ballappa, 3 October 1892 – 4 September 1966) was an Indian saint, guru, mystic, and a yogi.

== Life and miracles ==
=== Early life ===
Balumama was born on 4 October 1892 in a village called Akkol in Chikkodi taluk of Belgaum district in Karnataka in a Hindu dhangar (Shepherd) in a Kannada speaking family. His father was a shepherd named Mayappa and his mother's name was Sundaravva. He spent his childhood with his parents but was always lost in meditation. He later went on to live some time after do marriage The marriage did not last long. He was given about 15 sheep by his in-laws which he started to tend.

== Temple ==
Balumama attained samadhi at the age of 73 in 1966 in a village called Adamapur, Tal : Bhudargad in the Kolhapur district of Maharashtra. A temple was built in his memory in Adamapur, which lies between Nipani in Karnataka and Radhanagari in Maharashtra. The temple is managed by Shri Balumama Sansthana.

== Books ==
- Shri Sant Sadguru Devavtari Balumama Charitra Granth By C. S. Kulkarni (Marathi)
- Bhav-Bhakticha Bhandara By S. Killedar (Marathi)
- Shri Balumama Vijaygranth By Dr. Shrikrishna D. Deshmukh (Marathi)
- Shri Sant Sadguru Balumama Arati Sangraha' By B. B. Aidmale (Marathi)
- Sri Sant Sadguru Balumama Namanstotra' By Madhav Joshi (Marathi)
- Sri Sant Balumama Stavan By C. G. Patil (Marathi)

== Movies and TV show ==
- 'Sant Balumama (VCD Marathi)' by Fountain, directed by Rajesh Limkar, produced by Shailesh Limkar.
- 'Sant Balumama Full Movie' Bhakti Movie (Hindi Devotional Movie, Indian Movie, Hindi Movie), written and directed by Raju Fulkar.
- Balumamachya Navan Chang Bhala by Colors Marathi.
- Pavada Purush in Kannada by Colors Kannada
- Desi oon Stopmotion film, written by Swanand Kirkire
