= Vishwanath Kulkarni =

- Born: 11 February 1992 (age 34); Deulgaon Raja, Maharashtra, India
- Occupation: Actor
- Years active: 2016–present

Vishwanath Kulkarni (born 11 February 1992) is an Indian actor who works primarily in Marathi and Hindi films, television and web series. He is known for Mulshi Pattern (2018) and the television serial Yogyogeshwar Jai Shankar.

== Early life ==
Kulkarni was born on 11 February 1992 in Deulgaon Raja, Maharashtra, India. He completed a Master of Computer Applications (MCA) before pursuing acting as a full-time career.

== Career ==
Kulkarni began his acting career with the Marathi television serial Asmita in 2016. He has since appeared in several Marathi and Hindi television serials, including Yogyogeshwar Jai Shankar, Majhi Manasa, Jai Jai Swami Samarth and Aai Tuljabhavani.

He made his Marathi film debut in Mulshi Pattern (2018) and later appeared in Happy Patel: Khatarnak Jasoos, Mai: A Mother's Rage and Rudra: The Edge of Darkness. He also spoke about his experience shooting with Ajay Devgn during the filming of Rudra.

== Filmography ==
=== Films ===
| Year | Title | Role |
|---|---|---|
| 2018 | Mulshi Pattern | Vaibhav |
| 2024 | Rajkaran Gela Mishit | Aamdar |
| 2026 | Happy Patel: Khatarnak Jasoos | Shailesh |

=== Web series ===
| Year | Title | Role |
|---|---|---|
| 2022 | Mai: A Mother's Rage | Goyal's Goon |
| 2022 | Rudra: The Edge of Darkness | Shivaji Memane |

=== Shortfilm ===
| Year | Title | Role |
|---|---|---|
| 2025 | Lakshmi | Kanji |

=== Television ===
| Year | Title | Role |
|---|---|---|
| 2016 | Asmita | Reporter |
| 2016 | Tu Majha Saangaati | Yeshya |
| 2017 | Tu Ashi Jawali Raha | Sakha |
| 2018 | Majhya Navaryachi Bayko | Jacob |
| 2018 | Deva Shappath | Mohan |
| 2018–2019 | Tula Pahate Re | Groom |
| 2018–2022 | Crime Patrol Dastak | Various roles |
| 2019 | Prema Tujha Rang Kasa? | Various roles |
| 2019 | Special 5 | Vicky |
| 2019 | Shri Lakshmi Narayan | Agnidev |
| 2019 | Criminals – Chahul Gunhegaranchi | Various roles |
| 2019–2020 | Shree Gurudeva Dutta | Bhaskar |
| 2021 | Ghetla Vasa Taku Nako | Indradev |
| 2022 | Mere Sai – Shraddha Aur Saburi | Hemant |
| 2022 | Aboli | Manoj |
| 2022 | Nave Lakshya | Various roles |
| 2022–2023 | Yogyogeshwar Jai Shankar | Omkarnath Bhasme |
| 2024 | Majhi Manasa | Sampat |
| 2024 | Jai Jai Swami Samarth | Sardar Rangrao Khandagale |
| 2025–2026 | Aai Tuljabhavani | Nabhaji |
