= Rajkaran Gela Mishit =

- राजकारण गेलं मिशीत
- Directed by: Makarand Anaspure
- Written by: R. R. Borade
- Screenplay by: Yogesh Shirsath
- Produced by: Machhindra Lanke; Suresh Pathare; Shilpa Anaspure; Trishala Deshmane
- Starring: Makarand Anaspure; Prajakta Hanamghar
- Cinematography: Suresh Deshmane
- Edited by: Anant Kamath
- Music by: Atul Dive
- Production company: Bakulee Creations
- Release date: 19 April 2024
- Running time: 122 minutes
- Country: India
- Language: Marathi

Rajkaran Gela Mishit is a 2024 Indian Marathi-language comedy film directed by Makarand Anaspure, who also stars in the film. The film features Prajakta Hanamghar, Prakash Bhagwat, Vishwanath Kulkarni, Vijay Deshmukh and Raju Sonawane in supporting roles.

The film was theatrically released in India on 19 April 2024 and has a runtime of approximately 122 minutes.

== Plot ==
Rajkaran Gela Mishit is a political comedy set against the backdrop of politics and political life in Maharashtra. The film uses humour and satire in its portrayal of political situations and characters.

The film is based on the story Aga Aga Mishi by Marathi writer R. R. Borade.

== Cast ==
- Makarand Anaspure
- Prajakta Hanamghar
- Prakash Bhagwat
- Vishwanath Kulkarni as Aamdar
- Vijay Deshmukh
- Raju Sonawane
- Nitin Kulkarni
- Balu Mukadam
- Prashant Jadhav
- Vinit Bhonde
- Harish Tiwari
- Shweta Parkhe
- Unati Kamble
- Reshma Rathod
- Shailesh Rokade

== Production ==
The film was directed by Makarand Anaspure and produced under the banner of Bakulee Creations. The screenplay and dialogues were written by Yogesh Shirsath. The story was based on R. R. Borade's Aga Aga Mishi.

The cinematography was handled by Suresh Deshmane and the editing was done by Anant Kamath.

== Release ==
Rajkaran Gela Mishit was theatrically released in India on 19 April 2024.

The film was promoted as a political comedy against the backdrop of the political and electoral atmosphere in Maharashtra.

== Reception ==
The film received coverage in Marathi media around its theatrical release. Loksatta reported on the film's release and its basis in R. R. Borade's story Aga Aga Mishi.

Maharashtra Times also reported on the film ahead of its release, including information about its cast, story and Makarand Anaspure's involvement as director and lead actor.
