= Shree Gurudev Dutta =

2019 Indian Marathi devotional TV series

- Genre: Devotional
- Directed by: Deepak Dewoolkar
- Starring: Kashmira Kulkarni; Amit Bhanushali; Mandar Jadhav; Vishwanath Kulkarni
- Country of origin: India
- Original language: Marathi
- No. of episodes: 188

Production
- Producers: Deepak Dewoolkar; Nishigandha Wad
- Production locations: Mumbai, Maharashtra
- Cinematography: Vinayak Jadhav
- Camera setup: Multi-camera
- Running time: 22 minutes
- Production company: Ishwari Vision

Original release
- Network: Star Pravah
- Release: 17 June 2019 – 4 January 2020

Shree Gurudeva Dutta is an Indian Marathi language devotional TV series which aired on Star Pravah. The series premiered from 17 June 2019. The series was produced by Ishwari Vision production. Deepak Dewoolkar served as director, while Aruna Joglekar, Parag Kulkarni were credited as the writer.

The series is based on the life and legends associated with Dattatreya and focuses on his birth, childhood and divine journey, as well as the story of his mother Anasuya.

== Plot ==
The series follows the story of Dattatreya, a deity in Hindu tradition associated with the Trimurti of Brahma, Vishnu and Shiva. The narrative explores the story of Anasuya and Sage Atri, the circumstances surrounding Dattatreya's birth, his childhood and various events associated with his divine manifestations.

== Cast ==
=== Main ===
- Mandar Jadhav as Shri Gurudev Dutta
- Kashmira Kulkarni as Ansuya Mata

=== Recurring ===
- Vishwanath Kulkarni as Bhaskar
- Pooja Katurde as Angha Lakshmi
- Shashank Darne as Karnkumar
- Amit Kalyankar as Bhagwan Vishnu
- Siddhi Patne as Parvti Devi
- Amruta Bane as Sarswati Devi
- Jahnavi Killekar as Mata Lakshmi
- Sandeep Gaikwad as Bhagwan Shiva
- Eknath Gite as Suryadev
- Maitreya Bapat as Vedan
- Tushar Sali as Narad Muni
- Bhoomika Kadam as Vaishanvi
- Suprit Kadam as Wajra
