= Sangram Chougule =

Indian bodybuilder from Kolhapur

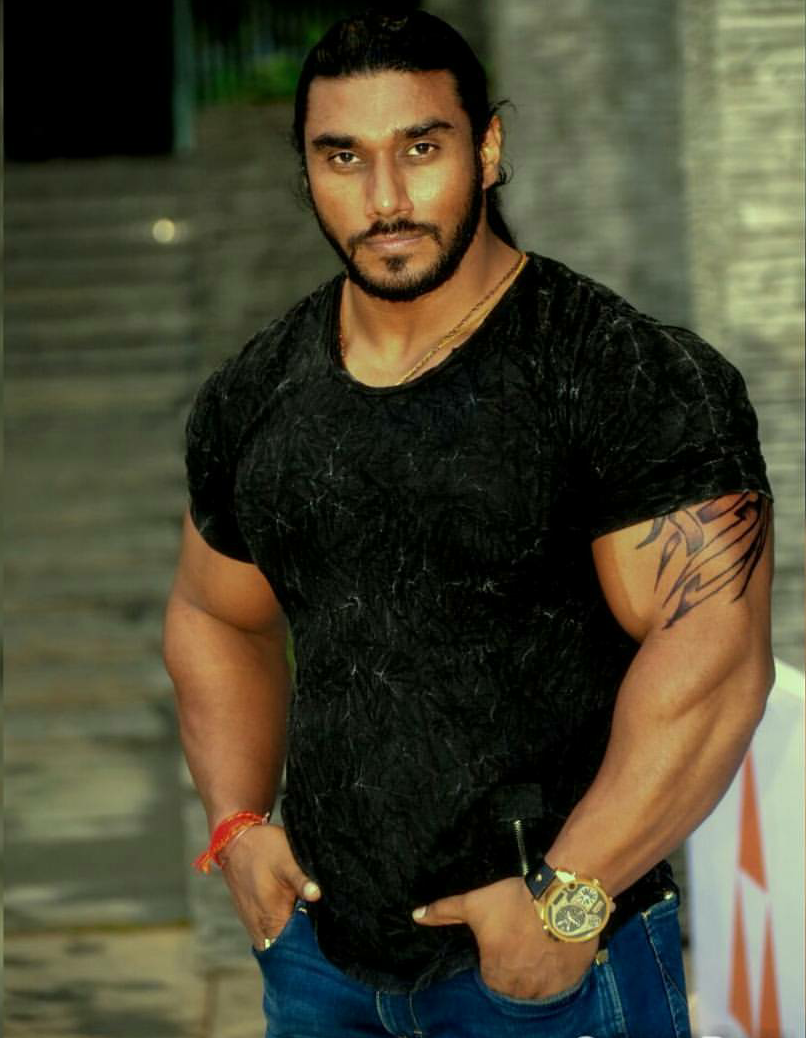

Founder and Owner of the Physc Gym

Personal details
- Born: Sangram Chougule; 28 December 1979 (age 46) Kolhapur, India
- Citizenship: Indian
- Height: 5 ft 8 in (1.73 m)
- Website: Official website
- Nickname: Sangram

Competition record

BodyBuilding

International achievements
1st	2012	Mr. Universe
1st	2014	Mr. World
2nd	2012	Mr. Asia
3rd	2011	Mr. Universe
3rd	2011	Mr. Asia

Mr. India
1st	2010	Goa
1st	2011	Bengaluru
1st	2012	Hyderabad
1st	2012	Karnataka
1st	2013	Kerala
1st	2015	Gujarat

Mr. Maharashtra
1st	2009	Pune
1st	2010	Mumbai
1st	2011	Jalna
1st	2012	Pune
1st	2014	Mumbai

Sangram Chougule (born 28 December 1979) is an Indian bodybuilder from Kolhapur, currently settled in Pune. He won the title of Mr. Universe 2012 in the 85 kg category. Sangram won the Mr. India title six times and Mr. Maharashtra five times. He is an Electrical Engineer by education.

== Film career ==
In 2019, he appeared in a Marathi language movie Dandam. He also played a role in Alay Mazya Rashila as Inspector Sangram. Recently, he participated in Reality show Bigg Boss Marathi 5 as a wild card contestant.

== Filmography ==
=== Films ===
Year	Title	Role	Ref.
2019	Dandam	Anna	
2023	Alay Mazya Rashila	Inspector Sangram	
2024	The Magnetic Fires	Zake	

=== Television ===
Year	Title	Role	Notes
2024	Bigg Boss Marathi 5	Contestant	Walked out (10th Place)
