= Jai Jai Swami Samarth =

2020 Indian Marathi devotional TV series

- Genre: Spirituality
- Based on: Swami Samarth
- Written by: Shirish Latkar
- Directed by: Umesh Namjoshi
- Starring: See below
- Country of origin: India
- Original language: Marathi
- No. of episodes: 2012

Production
- Producers: Rakesh Sarang; Sangeeta Sarang
- Editor: Narpat Choudhary
- Camera setup: Multi-Camera
- Running time: 22 minutes
- Production company: CamsKlub Studios

Original release
- Network: Colors Marathi
- Release: 28 December 2020 – present

Jai Jai Swami Samarth is an Indian Marathi language devotional TV series which airing on Colors Marathi. It premiered from 28 December 2020 by replacing Swamini. It is directed by Umesh Namjoshi and written by Shirish Latkar under the banner of CamsKlub Studios. Akshay Mudwadkar plays the role of Swami Samarth.

== Plot ==
It is story of Swami Samarth, an Indian spiritual master of Dattatreya tradition. Dignified, assertive, and commanding, he had little patience for the townspeople's impulsiveness and mischief. Widely known for his spirituality in Maharashtra, he lived during the 19th century.

== Cast ==
=== Main ===
- Akshay Mudwadkar as Swami Samarth

=== Recurring ===
- Vijaya Babar as Chanda
- Swanand Barve as Cholappa
- Akshata Naik as Yesubai
- Satish Salagare as Ramacharya
- Madhavi Soman as Sundara
- Neeta Pendse as Radhakka
- Vikas Patil as Haribhau
- Srushti Bahekar as Devyani
- Anuj Thackeray as Sumukh
- Vishwanath Kulkarni as Rangrao

== Awards ==
Colors Marathi Awards 2021-22
Category	Recipient	Role	Ref.
Best Child Actor		Krishnappa	
Best Father	Swanand Barve	Cholappa	
Best Actor	Akshay Mudwadkar	Swami Samarth	
Best Family		Cholappa Family	
Best Title Song			
Best Serial	Rakesh Sarang	Producer	
