= Deva Shappath =

2017 Indian Marathi language TV series

- Genre: Drama
- Story by: Shirish Latkar
- Directed by: Chandrakant Gaikwad
- Starring: Sankarshan Karhade, Kaumudi Walokar
- Country of origin: India
- Original language: Marathi
- No. of episodes: 274

Production
- Producers: Atul Ketkar, Aparna Ketkar
- Production locations: Mumbai, Maharashtra
- Camera setup: Multi-camera
- Running time: 22 minutes
- Production company: Right Click Media Solutions

Original release
- Network: Zee Yuva
- Release: 20 November 2017 – 29 September 2018

Deva Shappath (transl. God's Promise) is an Indian Marathi language TV series that aired on Zee Yuva. It starred Sankarshan Karhade and Kaumudi Walokar in lead roles. It premiered from 20 November 2017 and ended on 29 September 2018 completing 274 episodes.

The series was directed by Chandrakant Gaikwad and produced by Aparna and Atul Ketkar under the banner of Right Click Media Solutions. The series was based around the relationship between Shlok, an atheist, and Krish, a human incarnation of God who attempts to prove God’s existence to him.

== Plot ==
The series follows Shlok, who does not believe in the existence of God. Krish, who appears on Earth in human form, attempts to convince Shlok that God exists. The story focuses on the interactions between the two characters and their contrasting views on faith, belief and the existence of God. The series explored themes of faith and belief through the central conflict between an atheist character and a character presented as God in human form.

== Cast ==
- Sankarshan Karhade as Shlok
- Kaumudi Walokar as Kuhu
- Kshitish Date as Krish
- Swanand Barve as Appa
- Amruta Deshmukh as Lakshmi
- Vishwanath Kulkarni as Mohan
- Vidyadhar Joshi
- Chaitrali Gupte
- Seema Deshmukh
- Abhishek Kulkarni
- Shalmali Tolye
- Atul Todankar
- Ananda Karekar
