= Surekha Kudachi =

Indian actress

- Born: 17 July 1974 (age 52); Bombay, Maharashtra
- Occupations: Actress; dancer
- Years active: 1995 – present
- Spouse: Girish Udale (m. 2000; died 2013)
- Children: 1

Surekha Kudachi is an Indian actress and Lavani dancer who predominantly works in Marathi films and television productions.

== Personal life ==
Kudachi married to Girish Udale in 2000 but he died in 2013. She has a daughter named Janavi Udale.

== Filmography ==
=== Films ===
Year	Title	Role	Notes
1995	Zakhmi Kunku	Durga's sister-in-law	
1997	Hasari	Hasari's sister-in-law	
1997	Sasuchi Maya	Durga Deshmukh	
1999	Ratra Aarambh	Cameo appearance	
1999	Aai Thor Tujhe Upkar	Police's wife	
2000	Tuch Maji Bhagyalaxmi	Vaishali	
2000	Aai Shakti Devta	Mayavati	
2000	Dhani Kunkuvacha	Cameo appearance	
2000	Bhajiwali Sakhu Hawaldar Bhiku	Sakhu	
2004	Ranragini	Dancer in song Nazuk Taruni	Cameo appearance
2004	Ata Lagnala Chala	Surekha	
2005	Chatri Ke Neeche Aaja	Ramesh's sister	
2005	Mee Tulas Tujhya Angani	Durga	
2005	Kalubaichya Navana Changbhala	Akke	
2005	Hirva Shalu	Surki	
2005	Jay Adharbhuja Saptashrungi		
2006	Pahili Sher Doosri Savvasher Navra Pavsher	Kamla	
2006	Bhau Maza Pathirakha	Gauri's stepmother	
2006	Ata Mi Kashi Diste		
2006	Arre... Devaa!	Tukaram's wife	
2007	Bharat Aala Parat	Bharat's wife	
2007	Tahaan		
2007	Balirajeche Rajya Yeu De	Cameo appearance	
2007	Honar Sun Mi Tya Gharchi	Surekha	
2007	Sasuchi Varat Sunechya Darat	Cameo appearance	
2008	Foreignchi Patlin	Godakka Patil	
2008	Supari	Tai	
2008	Aara Aara Aaba Aata Tari Thamba	Zanabai	
2008	Tandala	Laxmi	
2009	Adi Maya Adi Shakti	Surekha	
2010	Khurchi Samrat	Lavani Dancer	Special appearance
2010	Chandrakala	Chandrakala's mother-in-law	
2010	Aaghaat	Maya	
2010	Agnipariksha	Bharati's sister-in-law	
2010	Bayko Zali Gayab	Lavani Dancer	Special appearance
2011	Superstar	Ranga's mother	
2011	Aajoba Vayat Aale	Professor Dekhne	
2012	Matter	Pakya's mother	
2012	Teen Bayka Fajiti Aika	Vishwasrao's mother	
2013	Ya Topikhali Dadlay Kay?	Sarpanch Vishwasrao's wife	
2014	Khel Premacha	Pooja's mother	
2017	Premay Namah	Prem's mother	
2017	Ek Maratha Lakh Maratha		
2018	Atrocity	Rishabh's mother	
2018	World Power 2035	Sarpanch	
2018	Mahasatta 2035	Sarpanch	
2018	Gotya	Gotya's mother	
2019	Tuza Durava	Rutuja's mother	
2020	Khel Ayushyacha		
2022	Bhraman Dhwani		
2023	Dil Dosti Deewangi	Catholic Miss Mary	
2024	Man Yedyagat Zala	Pooja's mother	
2024	Lek Asavi Tar Ashi	Mami	

=== Television ===
Year	Title	Role	Ref.
1998	Tisara Dola	Amarnath's sister	
2004-2005	Hasnyavari Gheu Naka	Episodic role	
2009-2011	Bhagyalakshmi	Kamini Mohite	
2011	Mangalsutra	Surekha Aatya	
2012	Devyani	Chandrika Vikhe-Patil	
2012-2013	Mala Sasu Havi	Abhilasha's mother	
2013-2014	Fu Bai Fu	Contestant	
2014-2016	Runji	Meenakshi	
2017	Chahool	Ghost	
2017-2019	Nakalat Saare Ghadle	Pratap's mother	
2019-2020	Navri Mile Navryala	Rukmini	
2020-2021	Chandra Aahe Sakshila	Meena Atya	
2021	Swabhiman – Shodh Astitvacha	Suparna Suryavanshi	
2021	Bigg Boss Marathi 3	Contestant	
2021-2022	Tujhya Rupacha Chandana	Aaisaheb	
2022	RaanBaazaar	Akka	
2022	Ashirwad Tuza Ekvira Aai	Tanya's mother	
2022-2023	Shetkarich Navra Hava	Suryakanta	
2023	Balumamachya Navan Changbhala	Akka	
2024	Pinkicha Vijay Aso!	Surekha	

== Accolades ==
Year	Award	Category	Work
2003	Maharashtra State Film Awards	Best Comedian	Polisachi Bayko
2008	Zee Chitra Gaurav Puraskar	Best Supporting Actress	Aara Aara Aaba Aata Tari Thamba
2010	Zee Marathi Utsav Natyancha Awards	Best Negative Role – Female	Bhagyalakshmi
2013	MaTa Sanman	Best Actress in a Supporting Role	Devyani
2023	Colors Marathi Awards	Best Negative Role – Female	Shetkarich Navra Hava
