= Mishal Raheja =

Indian television actor (born 1982)

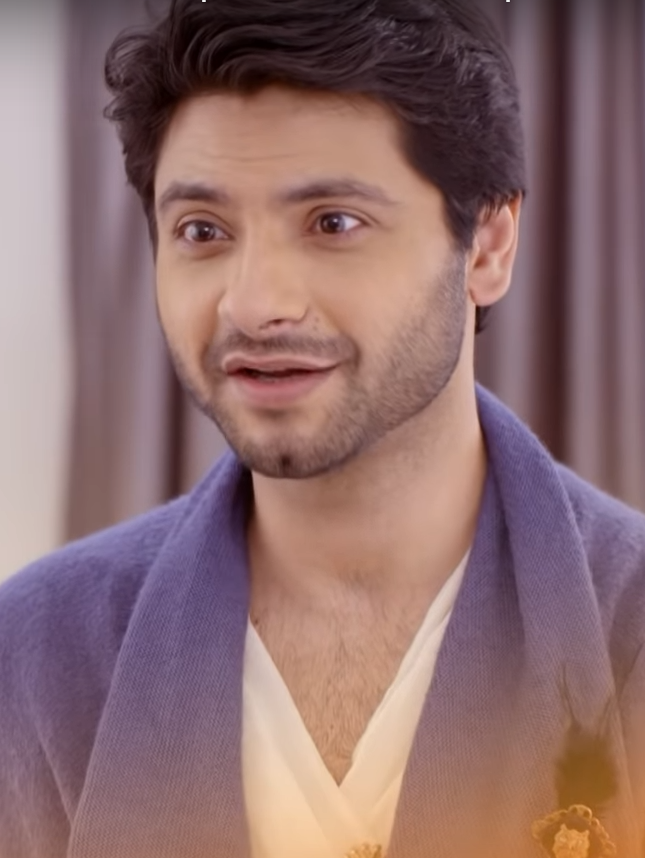
- Occupation: Actor

Mishal Raheja is an Indian television actor. He played Dr Sahil Aggarwal in Nikhil Advani's Mumbai Diaries 26/11 for Amazon Prime. He made his debut with the MTV show Pyar Vyar and All That and is known for portraying the role of Dutta Bhau in Laagi Tujhse Lagan, Akash Sehgal in Love Story and Viplav Tripathi in TV series Ishq Ka Rang Safed. He also essayed the character of King Singh in the Zee TV daily soap opera Kumkum Bhagya.

== Filmography ==
=== Television ===
Year	Show	Role	Ref(s)
2005–2006	Pyaar Vyaar and All That	Kush	
2007–2008	Love Story	Akash Sehgal	
2009–2011	Laagi Tujhse Lagan	Dutta Shriram Patil (Dutta Bhau)	
2010	Mano Ya Na Mano (Season 2)	Host	
2014	Encounter	Inspector Nitin Kamte	
2014	Maharakshak Aryan	Challa	
2014	Shaadi Vaadi and All That	Ranbir Ahuja	
2015–2016	Ishq Ka Rang Safed	Viplav Tripathi	
2018–2019	Kumkum Bhagya	King Singh	
2019	BOSS: Baap of Special Services	Vicky Malhotra	
2019	Sparsh	Jatin	

=== Web series ===
Year	Title	Role	Platform	Notes	Ref.
2021	Mumbai Diaries 26/11	Dr. Sahil Aggarwal	Amazon Prime Video		

=== Special appearance ===
Year	Title	Role	Channel	Notes
2010	Maat Pitaah Ke Charnon Mein Swarg	Dutta Bhau	Colors TV	Guest appearance
2010	Raaj Pichle Janam Ka	Himself	NDTV Imagine	Guest appearance
2013	Punar Vivah - Ek Nayi Umeed	Himself	Zee TV	Guest appearance
2019	Kundali Bhagya	King Singh	Zee TV	Guest appearance

== Awards and nominations ==
=== The Indian Television Academy Awards ===
Nominated

- 2010 - ITA Best Actor Popular Award for Laagi Tujhse Lagan

=== BIG Star Entertainment Awards ===
Nominated

- 2010 - BIG Star Television Actor (Male) Award for Laagi Tujhse Lagan
