= Nakusha =

Indian pejorative name for girls

Nakusha, or Nakushi, is a derogatory given name that means "unwanted" in the Indian language Marathi, given by some parents in rural Maharashtra, India, to unwanted female children, in the belief that doing so will ensure that their next child is a boy.

A government campaign exists to find such girls, and allow them to officially change their names. In the Satara district, girls named "Nakusha" or "Nakushi" are renamed, automatically enrolled in school and granted free transport to school, while parents of these children obtain free food.

== See also ==
- Sexism in India
