= Akkol, Belagavi =

Village in Karnataka, India

Coordinates: 16°27′55″N 74°25′03″E

Akkol Kannada pronunciation: [ɐkkoːl]
- Village
- Interactive map of Akkol
- Country: India
- State: Karnataka
- District: Belagavi
- Taluka: Nippani

Area
  - Total: 940 ha (2,300 acres)

Population (2011)
  - Total: 8,823
  - Density: 940/km^{2} (2,400/sq mi)

Akkol is a village in Nippani taluka of Belgavi district, Karnataka, India.

== Census ==
According to 2011 Census of India, Akkol has a total population of 8,823 peoples, out of which male population is 4,407 while female population is 4,416. Literacy rate of the village is 67.78 percentage.
