= Tujhya Rupacha Chandana =

2021 Indian Marathi-language TV series

- Genre: Drama; Soap opera
- Created by: Colors Marathi
- Starring: See below
- Country of origin: India
- Original language: Marathi
- No. of episodes: 142

Production
- Camera setup: Multi-camera
- Running time: 22 minutes

Original release
- Network: Colors Marathi
- Release: 27 December 2021 – 28 May 2022

Related
- Laagi Tujhse Lagan

Tujhya Rupacha Chandana (transl. The moon of your form) is an Indian Marathi language television series which aired on Colors Marathi. The show premiered from 27 December 2021 and ended on 28 May 2022 completing 142 episodes. It stars Rohit Nikam and Tanvi Shewale in lead roles. It is an official remake of Hindi TV series Laagi Tujhse Lagan.

== Plot ==
Set in rural Paschim Maharashtra, it is the love story of Nakshatra, a beautiful young woman who is forced to hide her identity and Dattabhau, a local gangster. Nakshatra and her family are on the run from Mumbai and find shelter in Kolhapur's Datta Temple where her life takes a turn after a fateful encounter with Datta.

== Cast ==
=== Main ===
- Tanvi Shewale as Nakshatra
- Rohit Nikam as Datta

=== Recurring ===
- Surekha Kudachi as Maheshwari (Aaisaheb)
- Sushant Shelar as Mayur More
- Anupama Takmoghe
- Pranita Acharekar
- Shrutakirti Sawant
- Gauri Kiran as Shashikala

== Adaptations ==
Language	Title	Original release	Network(s)	Last aired	Notes
Hindi	Laagi Tujhse Lagan लागी तुझसे लगन	28 December 2009	Colors TV	6 January 2012	Original
Marathi	Tujhya Rupacha Chandana तुझ्या रूपाचं चांदणं	27 December 2021	Colors Marathi	28 May 2022	Remake
Kannada	Drishti Bottu ದೃಷ್ಟಿ ಬೊಟ್ಟು	10 September 2024	Colors Kannada	21 September 2025	Remake
