= Ghetla Vasa Taku Nako =

2021 Marathi language devotional series

- Genre: Mythological
- Based on: Chaturmas; Bhagavat Purana; Vishnu Purana
- Narrated by: Atulshastri Bhagre; Charudatta Aphale
- Country of origin: India
- Original language: Marathi
- No. of episodes: 246

Production
- Camera setup: Multi-camera
- Running time: 22 minutes
- Production company: The Film Clique

Original release
- Network: Zee Marathi
- Release: 8 March 2021 – 9 April 2022

Ghetla Vasa Taku Nako is an Indian television series depicting epic stories and tales of Chaturmas, Bhagavat Purana, Vishnu Purana narrated by Atulshastri Bhagre and Charudatta Aphale Gurujis. It premiered on 8 March 2021.

== Plot ==
=== Mahashivratri special ===
==== Story of Chandrabhan ====
Guruji narrates the tale of Chandrabhan, an ardent devotee of Lord Shiva. The story begins when Goddess Parvati throws her divine stole on earth to test Chandrabhan. The money lenders wife's adamance endangers Chandrabhan and his wife's life. Chandrabhan unknowingly ends up worshipping Lord Shiva when he goes to kill a deer, just then he faces new trouble. Chandrabhan aims to kill the deer who arrives at the pond to save Amba. However, he gets distressed on hearing each one's plight and sets them free. Later, he sees Lord Shiva's 'Pind' under a tree. The money lender punishes Chandrabhan who returns empty handed. Goddess Parvati accepts that Chandrabhan is a true worshipper and her stole saves him and Amba. Shiva-Parvati appear before the couple.

==== Story of Handful Milk ====
Bhagre Guruji tells the tale of a woman who is a strong believer in God. While the King's strange behaviour troubles the people in his kingdom, a sage gives a curse to the kingdom due to his rudeness. The sage's curse causes draught in the kingdom and the people starve. On learning about this, the queen decides to meet the sage. Later, Mai gives a 'Bhakari' to the thief who breaks into her house. The queen goes to a sage to find counter-measures for the curse. Accordingly, the king asks his people to donate milk for the ‘Pind’. Mai refuses to give all the milk. When the King punishes Mai, she asks for a bowl of milk, that she wishes to give Lord Shankar, as her last request. Seeing the miracle after the bowl is kept, the King realises his mistake.

=== Bhanu Saptami special ===
Bhagre Guruji narrates the tale of 'Bhanu Saptami Vrata'. Indumati, a courtesan, comes across Maharaj Samar at a riverside. After being ill-treated by Sardar Kumar, she worships god for a good husband. Queen Kanchanmala tells Maharaj her decision of personally welcoming her mother. Later, Queen Kanchanmala gets furious when Sardar Kumar tells her that Maharaj is in Indumati's palace. When Indumati confesses that she loves Maharaj Samar, Lallan makes her aware of the reality. She appeases Maharaj Samar by making his favourite cuisine. Kanchanmala questions Maharaj Samar over Indumati.

== Episodes ==
Episode No.	Telecast Date	Festival	Title
1-4	8-11 March 2021	Maha Shivaratri	Story of Chandrabhan
5-8	12-16 March 2021	Maha Shivaratri	Story of Handful Milk
9-17	17-26 March 2021	Bhanu Saptami	Story of Indumati
18-27	27 March-7 April 2021	Holi	Story of Pralhad
28-37	8-18 April 2021	Gudi Padwa	Story of Parvati
38-43	19-24 April 2021	Rama Navami	Story of Ram
44-48	16-20 August 2021	Satya Narayan	Story of Narayan
49-51	21-24 August 2021	Shraavana	Story of Shatananda
52-57	25-31 August 2021	Shraavana	Story of Sadhu Vani
58-65	1-9 September 2021	Mangalagaur	Story of Anusuya
66-69	10-14 September 2021	Ganeshotsav	Story of Ganesh
70-73	15-18 September 2021	Ganeshotsav	Story of Priyavrat
74-76	20-22 September 2021	Pitru Paksh	Story of Karna
77-85	23 September-2 October 2021	Pitru Paksh	Story of Bhagirath and Ganga
86-90	4-8 October 2021	Navaratri	Story of Mahishasura
91-97	9-16 October 2021	Navaratri	Story of Shunbha and Nishunbha
98-104	18-25 October 2021	Lord Shani	Story of Shanidev
105-110	26 October-2 November 2021	Lord Shani	Story of Vikramaditya
111-113	3-5 November 2021	Diwali	Story of Lamps
114-117	6-10 November 2021	Diwali	Story of Narakasura
118-122	11-16 November 2021	Tulsi Vivah	Story of Vrinda
123-130	17-25 November 2021	Jivati Mata	Story of Sahuri
131-138	26 November-4 December 2021	Lalita Panchami	Story of Sukirt
139-147	6-15 December 2021	Margshirsh Thursday	Mahalaxmi Vrat
148-153	16-22 December 2021	Shila Saptami	Story of Padmakumar
154-160	23-30 December 2021	Pithori Amavasya	Story of Avani
161-172	31 December 2021 – 13 January 2022	Suryanarayan Vrat	Story of Sarita & Vanita
173-188	14 January-1 February 2022	Fast of Sixteen Mondays	Story of Devvrata
189-202	2-17 February 2022	Fast of Fridays	Story of Devdutta
203-209	18-25 February 2022	Significance of Monday	Story of Kalpavasu
210-222	26 February-12 March 2022	Sampat Saturday Vrat	Story of Ballal
223-230	14-22 March 2022	Somvati Amavasya Fast	Story of Gunvati
231-239	23 March-1 April 2022	Budh-Brihaspati Vrat	Story of Varunika
240-246	2-9 April 2022	Gatha Saptashati	Story of Vijayananda

== Reception ==
The show aired on Zee Marathi from 8 March 2021 by replacing Majhya Navaryachi Bayko. Due to COVID-19 pandemic in Maharashtra, the show was stopped on 24 April 2021 and it again restarted from 16 August 2021.

=== Special episode (1 hour) ===
- 18 April 2021
