= Rama Raghav =

2023 Indian Marathi-language TV series

- Genre: Drama; Soap opera
- Created by: Colors Marathi
- Starring: See below
- Country of origin: India
- Original language: Marathi
- No. of episodes: 463

Production
- Camera setup: Multi-camera
- Running time: 22 minutes
- Production company: Creative Transmedia

Original release
- Network: Colors Marathi
- Release: 9 January 2023 – 27 July 2024

Related
- Ramachaari

Rama Raghav is an Indian Marathi language television series which is produced under the banner of Creative Transmedia. The show premiered from 9 January 2023 airing on Colors Marathi. It stars Aishwarya Shete and Nikhil Damle in lead roles. It is an official remake of Kannada TV series Ramachaari.

== Summary ==
Raghav, who hails from a family of priests, is embroiled in a clash with Rama, from the prestigious Lavanya Solutions. With her ego hurt, she decides to avenge the insult by ruining his peace. Rama Raghav is the story of complicated, entangled lives.

== Plot ==
Manorama "Rama" Paranjape is the daughter of business tycoon Girish Paranjape and his wife Lavanya. She is spoilt and reckless due to the influence of her elitist mother. In contrast, Raghav Purohit is the middle child of the local priest Gajanan Purohit and is often praised as an exemplary son, which causes envy within his elder brother, Kartikeya. One morning, Raghav is tasked with observing a ritual where he must bear Devi's idol on his shoulders and walk a certain distance without stopping. At the same time, Rama recklessly drives her car into the procession. Raghav steps over Rama's car and continues his ritual, which enrages her. That same day, when Gajanan suddenly becomes unwell, Raghav officiates a ceremony for Girish on his father's behalf. Rama is angered when Raghav orders her to wear a traditional attire. Raghav finds out that Girish has remarried to a different wife called Pavitra, and honours her alongside Lavanya, with whom this incident does not sit well with. At the end of the ceremony, Girish is inspired by Raghav's speech and decides to make Rama his business heir, but only after she completes three months of employment at a software solutions company. Rama reluctantly applies for a job and gets selected, only to find out that Raghav has also joined the same company at the same time. Since then, Rama vows to bully Raghav until he quits the company.

Many incidents take place, but none of Rama's schemes work against Raghav. As time passes, Rama gradually changes her opinion about Raghav and develops feelings for him. Meanwhile, Gajanan becomes increasingly worried after reading Raghav's horoscope and deliberately scolds him to prevent a feud between his two sons. One day, Girish becomes exasperated with Rama's irresponsible behaviour. He blames Lavanya for being such a bad influence to Rama and coerces her to let their daughter stay at the Purohits’ house for a month. He blackmails Lavanya by threatening to show the evidence of her attempt to abort Rama, should she not do so. It is revealed that Lavanya was utterly neglectful towards Rama until the latter was two years old, and the only reason Lavanya pampers Rama is to prevent her from loving her stepmother Pavitra. Initially, Gajanan is not pleased about Rama staying with them, however Raghav and Shalini encourage her to follow his family's conventions. Slowly and gradually, Rama adapts to the Purohits' customs and falls for Raghav. Behind Girish's and Rama's backs, Lavanya arranges Rama's marriage with Manasi and Mandar's son, Varun, who happens to be in love with Rama's stepsister Arushi, who informs Rama about the entire matter, and the two accordingly proceed to stop their parents. Lavanya is enraged when she learns that she can no longer manipulate Rama to her whims and fancies, so she vows to destroy the Purohits in retaliation. She attempts to tarnish the honour of Raghav's younger sister, Shruti, by making her fall in love with a conman hired by her, however Rama inadvertently thwarts it. Later, Lavanya seizes the Purohits' house, forcing them to move elsewhere. Rama and Girish anonymously provide another residence to the Purohits. Afterwards, during a festival, Lavanya hires burglars to steal the sacred jewels from the Purohits, but Rama retrieves them with Raghav's help. Eventually, Rama is horrified to learn of Lavanya's wicked schemes. When Lavanya plans yet another scheme to reduce the Purohits to poverty, Rama and Girish disown her and throw her out of the house. Lavanya vows to take revenge on Girish and the Purohits, while Girish forbids his family from interacting with Lavanya. Later, Girish reluctantly allows Lavanya to return home on Gajanan's insistence. Lavanya pretends to be a good woman in an attempt to manipulate Rama, but this time, she refuses to give in. As time goes along, Lavanya gains the approval of Pavitra and her daughter Arushi as she acts like a responsible and respectful housewife while plotting her revenge against the Purohits. During this time, Arushi reveals her feelings towards Varun and the two decide to get married. Rama also admits her love for Raghav to her friends and Raghav reveals it to Pooja and Narayan. Raghav decides to propose to Rama, but just as he is about to do it he gets a call from Pooja and leaves immediately without saying a word to Rama. Rama becomes extremely concerned and agitated as she tries to get an answer from Raghav, but he does not talk to her due to the insistence of Pooja. Shalini becomes concerned by Rama and Raghav's behaviour and calls both of them to talk. Rama tells her about her feelings for Raghav and she approves of their match, and Rama challenges her that she will get Raghav to admit his feelings for him. However, when she is unsuccessful, she decides to move overseas to the US immediately, as she has no joy living in Nashik. When Raghav learns of this, he is torn between his word to Pooja and his love for Rama. In the end, he decides to catch her at the airport and reveal his feelings to her. He manages to catch her in time and tells her how he feels, and the two are overjoyed.

As days go by, tensions arise, which threaten to impede Rama and Raghav's romance. Rama decides to break up with Raghav, but the couple end up eloping. Over the months, Lavanya makes numerous attempts to break Rama away from the Purohit family. Eventually, Rama tricks Lavanya into confessing her wicked deeds and the latter is arrested. Lavanya makes one last attempt by sending goons to kill Raghav, but it fails. Shalini emphatically tells Lavanya to stay away from Rama and threatens her with dire consequences.

One year later, Rama establishes a Vedic Gurukul with the help of the Purohit family. Rama and Raghav fondly reminisce the events that brought them together and express their gratitude for their marriage.

== Cast ==
=== Main ===
- Aishwarya Shete as Manorama (Rama) Girish Paranjape
- Nikhil Damle as Raghav Gajanan Purohit

=== Recurring ===
- Gautam Joglekar / Shrirang Deshmukh as Girish Paranjape, Rama's father, Lavanya's ex-husband and Pavitra's husband
- Sheetal Kshirsagar as Lavanya Girish Paranjape, Rama's mother and Girish's ex-wife
- Sai Ranade as Pavitra Girish Paranjape, Rama's stepmother and Girish's wife
- Smita Haldankar as Arushi Girish Paranjape, Rama's stepsister
- Suhita Thatte as Rukmini Purohit, Raghav’s grandmother
- Prajakta Kelkar as Shalini Gajanan Purohit, Raghav’s mother
- Harshini Bhagwat as Shruti Gajanan Purohit, Raghav's sister
- Archana Nipankar / Shweta Ambikar as Pooja Kartikeya Purohit, Kartikeya's wife
- Chandanraj Jamdade as Kartikeya Gajanan Purohit, Raghav's brother
- Sonal Pawar / Bhagyashri Nhalve as Ashwini
- Shubham Rane as Narayan
- Priyanka Deshmukh as Neha
- Mahesh Joshi as Mama, Shalini's brother

== Adaptations ==
Language	Title	Original release	Network(s)	Last aired	Notes
Kannada	Ramachaari ರಾಮಾಚಾರಿ	31 January 2022	Colors Kannada	5 September 2025	Original
Marathi	Rama Raghav रमा राघव	9 January 2023	Colors Marathi	27 July 2024	Remake
Bengali	Ramkrishna রামকৃষ্ণ	10 April 2023	Colors Bangla	21 July 2024	Remake
