= Colors Marathi =

Indian Marathi television channel

- Logo used since 2016
- Country: India
- Headquarters: Mumbai, Maharashtra, India

Programming
- Language: Marathi
- Picture format: 1080p HDTV

Ownership
- Owner: JioStar
- Sister channels: List of Colors sister channels

History
- Launched: 9 July 2000; 26 years ago
- Former names: ETV Marathi 2000–2015

Links
- Website: Official website

Availability

Streaming media
- JioHotstar: India
- YouTube: India

Colors Marathi (previously known as ETV Marathi) is an Indian Marathi language general entertainment channel owned by JioStar, a joint venture between Viacom18 and Disney India. It primarily telecasts programs such as serials, reality shows and Marathi films.

== History ==
The channel was rebranded under the Viacom18 Colors franchise on 22 March 2015 with the tagline "Saaj Nava, Rang Nava" (translation: New Trappings, New Colour). It again rebranded itself on 27 July 2015 with a new tagline "Rang Marathi, Gandh Marathi" (translation: Colour Marathi, Fragrance Marathi). After that, it again rebranded itself in 2019 with the current tagline "Jagnyache Rang Marathi" (translation: Life's Colour is Marathi). Due to the COVID-19 pandemic, they stopped their current programming on 21 March 2020 and resumed programming on 21 July 2020 after four months.

== Award functions ==
Year	Awards	Ref.
2019–2023	Colors Marathi Awards	

== Current broadcast ==
Premiere date	Series	Ref.
16 March 2026	Mi Jinkun Ghein Saara	
23 March 2026	Mohini – Premachi Filmy Kahani	
28 December 2020	Jai Jai Swami Samarth	
3 October 2024	Aai Tuljabhavani	

== Former broadcast ==
=== Drama series ===
1. Abeer Gulal
2. Antarpaat
3. Asava Sundar Swapnancha Bangla
4. Assa Sasar Surekh Baai
5. Balumamachya Navan Changbhala
6. Bhagya Dile Tu Mala
7. Chahool
8. Chandra Aahe Sakshila
9. Char Divas Sasuche
10. Ganpati Bappa Morya
11. Ghadge & Suun
12. Jeev Majha Guntala
13. Jeev Zala Yedapisa
14. Kasturi
15. Kavyanjali – Sakhi Savali
16. Kunku Tikali Ani Tatoo
17. Lakshmi Sadaiv Mangalam
18. Lek Majhi Durga
19. Radha Prem Rangi Rangli
20. Raja Ranichi Ga Jodi
21. Rama Raghav
22. Sakhya Re
23. Saraswati
24. Shubhmangal Online
25. Sukhachya Sarini He Man Baware
26. Sundara Manamadhe Bharli
27. Swamini
28. Tu Majha Saangaati
29. Tujhya Rupacha Chandana
30. Yogyogeshwar Jai Shankar

=== Reality shows ===
1. Dholkichya Talavar
2. Jhunj Marathmoli
3. Kon Hoil Marathi Crorepati
4. Sur Nava Dhyas Nava
5. Bigg Boss Marathi
  - Bigg Boss Marathi season 1
  - Bigg Boss Marathi season 2
  - Bigg Boss Marathi season 3
  - Bigg Boss Marathi season 4
  - Bigg Boss Marathi season 5
  - Bigg Boss Marathi season 6
