= Bigg Boss Marathi =

Indian Marathi language reality show

- The eye logo of Bigg Boss Marathi Season 6 with host Ritesh Deshmukh
- Based on: Bigg Boss
- Presented by: Mahesh Manjrekar (S1–S4); Riteish Deshmukh (S5–S6)
- Voices of: Ratnakar Tardalkar
- Country of origin: India
- Original language: Marathi
- No. of seasons: 6
- No. of episodes: 566

Production
- Running time: 90–120 minutes
- Production company: Endemol Shine Group (2018–19) Banijay Entertainment (2021–26)

Original release
- Network: Colors Marathi
- Release: 15 April 2018 – 19 April 2026

Bigg Boss Marathi is the Marathi-language version of the reality television programme Bigg Boss, based on Big Brother, which aired on Colors Marathi. Mahesh Manjrekar hosted the show for four seasons and the fifth, sixth season was hosted by Ritesh Deshmukh. The third season was to be launched in May 2020, but later postponed in September 2021 due to the COVID-19 pandemic.

== Overview ==
=== Concept ===
Bigg Boss Marathi is a reality show based on the Hindi show Bigg Boss, which itself is based on the original Dutch Big Brother format developed by John de Mol Jr. A number of contestants (known as "housemates") live in a purpose-built house and are isolated from the rest of the world. Each week, housemates nominate two of their fellow housemates for eviction, and the housemates who receive the most nominations would face a public vote. Eventually, one housemate would leave after being "evicted" from the House. In the final week, there will be five housemates remaining, and the public will vote for who they wanted to win. Unlike other versions of Big Brother, the Marathi version uses celebrities as housemates, not members of the general public.

=== Rules ===
They are not supposed to tamper with any of the electronic equipment or any other thing in the House. They cannot leave the House premises at any time except when permitted to. They cannot discuss the nomination process with anyone. They cannot sleep in the day time. Also, they need to wear mic all the time and speak in only Marathi language. Sometimes, the housemates may be nominated for other reasons, such as nomination by a person who has achieved special privileges (via tasks or other things), for breaking rules or something else. If something is very serious, a contestant may be evicted directly. All the rules have never been told to the audience, the most prominent ones are clearly seen. The inmates are not permitted to talk in any other language than Marathi language.

=== Nomination ===
Nomination is a mandatory activity, usually taking place on first day of the week in which all housemates need to take part unless directed by Bigg Boss. Each housemate nominates two other housemates for eviction. Housemates getting maximum nomination votes will be nominated for eviction from the house in that week and undergoes public vote (through JioCinema) for retention. On the weekend episode, usually one contestant with lowest public votes will be evicted from the house. A housemate may also be directly nominated for eviction by that week's captain of the house or for other reasons by the Bigg Boss. Housemates who are awarded 'immunity' can not be nominated by other contestants. Immunity is automatically given to the week's captain and can be earned by contestants through winning specific tasks or achieving secret tasks given by Bigg Boss. Sometimes, the captain can make a contestant immune from nomination upon Bigg Boss' direction. The housemates are not allowed to discuss about the nominations or the nomination process with each other.

=== Captaincy ===
The captaincy concept was introduced in the second season. A captain is selected for every week by the Bigg Boss through specific tasks or elected by the housemates. A captain will have additional privileges in the form of immunity from nomination for that particular week, exemption from participating in the task activities and a separate bedroom with facilities more than that of other contestants. The captain will be exempted from nomination procedure for his/her captaincy week and will have power to either nominate a housemate directly or make a housemate immune from nomination or rescue a nominated housemate, depending on Bigg Boss' decisions. Captain's main duty is to supervise the weekly task and make sure the conditions and stipulations are met and task is performed well to procure the 'luxury budget' for the next week. Captains should also keep an eye on house rules and may punish a housemate for violating the rules.

=== Broadcast ===
Bigg Boss Marathi is aired on Colors Marathi and JioCinema. Everyday's episodes contain the main happenings of the previous day. Every weekend episode mainly focuses on an interview of the evicted contestant by the host.

=== Eviction ===
Contestants are nominated every week by their housemates. Viewers cast their vote in favour of the contestants they would like to save from eviction. The contestant with the fewest votes is evicted from the house.

=== Events ===
Day	Monday	Tuesday	Wednesday	Thursday	Friday	Saturday	Sunday
Event	Nominations	Weekly task		Luxury budget task	Captaincy task	Interview	Eviction

== Series details ==
Series	Host	House Location	House Theme	Episodes	Originally released			Days	Housemates	Prize Money	Winner	Runner-up
Series	Host	House Location	House Theme	Episodes	First released	Last released	Network	Days	Housemates	Prize Money	Winner	Runner-up
1	Mahesh Manjrekar	Lonavala	Traditional	99	15 April 2018	22 July 2018	Colors Marathi	98	18	₹75 lakh (US$78,000)	Megha Dhade	Pushkar Jog
2	Mahesh Manjrekar	Film City, Mumbai	Royal Mansion	99	26 May 2019	1 September 2019	Colors Marathi	98	17	₹75 lakh (US$78,000)	Shiv Thakare	Neha Shitole
3	Mahesh Manjrekar	Film City, Mumbai	Cultural	99	19 September 2021	26 December 2021	Colors Marathi	98	17	₹40 lakh (US$42,000)	Vishal Nikam	Jay Dudhane
4	Mahesh Manjrekar	Film City, Mumbai	Chawl	99	2 October 2022	8 January 2023	Colors Marathi	98	19	₹50 lakh (US$52,000)	Akshay Kelkar	Apurva Nemlekar
5	Riteish Deshmukh	Film City, Mumbai	Maze	71	28 July 2024	6 October 2024	Colors Marathi	70	17	₹25 lakh (US$26,000)	Suraj Chavan	Abhijeet Sawant
6	Riteish Deshmukh	Film City, Mumbai	Doors and windows	99	11 January 2026	19 April 2026	Colors Marathi	98	21	₹15 lakh (US$16,000)	Tanvi Kolte	Raqesh Bapat

== Housemate pattern ==
Clique	S1	S2	S3	S4	S5	S6
Film Star	Megha Dhade	Digambar Naik	Surekha Kudachi	Tejaswini Lonari	Varsha Usgaonkar	Deepali Bhosle-Sayed
Film Star	Bhushan Kadu	Kishori Shahane	Akshay Waghmare	Megha Ghadge	Nikki Tamboli	Sonali Raut
Film Star	Pushkar Jog	Aroh Velankar	Avishkar Darwhekar	Aroh Velankar	Pandharinath Kamble	Raqesh Bapat
Film Star	Rajesh Shringarpure	Abhijeet Kelkar	Neetha Shetty	—	—	—
Film Star	Resham Tipnis	Neha Shitole	—	—	—	—
Film Star	Sai Lokur	Vidyadhar Joshi	—	—	—	—
Film Star	Smita Gondkar	Maithily Jawkar	—	—	—	—
Film Star	Sushant Shelar	—	—	—	—	—
Television Star	Usha Nadkarni	Veena Jagtap	Vikas Patil	Yashashri Masurkar	Yogita Chavan	Vishal Kotial
Television Star	Jui Gadkari	Shivani Surve	Gayatri Datar	Amruta Deshmukh	Vaibhav Chavan	Vishal Kotian
Television Star	Rutuja Dharmadhikari	Maadhav Deochake	Sneha Wagh	Apurva Nemlekar	Nikhil Damle	Ayush Sanjeev
Television Star	Aastad Kale	Rupali Bhosale	Vishal Nikam	Amruta Dhongade	Jahnavi Killekar	—
Television Star	Vinit Bhonde	Neha Shitole	Mira Jagannath	Nikhil Rajeshirke	—	—
Television Star	Nandkishor Choughule	—	Sonali Patil	Kiran Mane	—	—
Television Star	Sharmishtha Raut	—	Adish Vaidya	Akshay Kelkar	—	—
Television Star	—	—	—	Ruchira Jadhav	—	—
Television Star	—	—	—	Prasad Jawade	—	—
Television Star	—	—	—	Snehlata Vasaikar	—	—
Singer	Tyagraj Khadilkar	Vaishali Mhade	Utkarsh Shinde	—	Abhijeet Sawant	Prajakta Shukre
Singer	—	—	Santosh Choudhari	—	Aarya Jadhav	Sachin Kumavat
Journalist	Anil Thatte	—	—	—	—	—
Comedian	Aarti Solanki	—	—	—	Pandharinath Kamble	Sagar Karande
International Star	—	—	—	—	Irina Rudakova	—
Dancer	Pushkar Jog	Surekha Punekar	—	Vikas Sawant	—	Radha Patil
Dancer	—	Heena Panchal	—	Rakhi Sawant	—	Rakhi Sawant
Chef	—	Parag Kanhare	—	—	—	—
Political Personality	—	Abhijeet Bichukale	Trupti Desai	—	—	Divya Shinde
Seasoned Model	—			Rohit Shinde	Nikki Tamboli	Roshan Bhajankar
Seasoned Model	—			—	Sangram Chougule	—
Reality Show Alumni	—	Shiv Thakare	Meenal Shah	Samruddhi Jadhav	Arbaz Patel	Ruchita Jamdar
Reality Show Alumni	—	—	—	Jay Dudhane	Yogesh Jadhav	—
You Tube Sensation	—	—	—	—	Ankita Prabhu Walawalkar	Karan Sonawane
You Tube Sensation	—	—	—	—	Dhananjay Powar	Prabhu Shelke
You Tube Sensation	—	—	—	—	Ghanashyam Darvade	Anushri Mane
You Tube Sensation	—	—	—	—	Suraj Chavan	—
Motivational Speaker	—	—	Shivlila Patil	—	Purushottam Dada Patil	—
Non - Celebrity	—	—	—	Trishul Marathe	—	Omkar Raut
Winner	Megha Dhade	Shiv Thakare	Vishal Nikam	Akshay Kelkar	Suraj Chavan	Tanvi Kolte
Runner up	Pushkar Jog	Neha Shitole	Jay Dudhane	Apurva Nemlekar	Abhijeet Sawant	Raqesh Bapat

== Controversies ==
=== Season 1 ===
- Resham Tipnis and Rajesh Shringarpure rumour relationship created controversy in the Bigg Boss House.
- On Day 8, The Khurchi Samrat Task divided the House into two groups leading to several controversies.
- In a captaincy task where contenders were Jui Gadkari and Pushkar Jog. A tie-breaker task followed, during which some contestants displayed aggressive behavior. In the heat of competition, Usha Nadkarni, Jui, and Anil Thatte were injured after falling, but the game continued. A major confrontation erupted between Sushant Shelar and Pushkar Jog, with the former resorting to inappropriate language. Despite efforts from Rajesh Shringarpure and Aastad Kale to calm the situation, tensions remained high. The show saw contestants engaging in loud arguments, with some physical altercations occurring during the task.

=== Season 2 ===
- During the Chor Bazaar Task, Shivani Surve tried to pull Veena Jagtap inside the jail. But, as she refused to come, both started fighting then Surve kicked Veena Jagtap.
- Surve had asked Bigg Boss to let her go home and threatened to file case against the makers if they don't do so. When Bigg Boss warned her for the same, she apologised to Bigg Boss.
- Abhijeet Bichukale was arrested from the house in connection with a cheque bouncing case.
- Parag Kanhere got into a physical fight with Neha Shitole. He ended up slapping her and physical altercation with Vaishali Mhade causing a ruckus in the House.

=== Season 3 ===
- Jay Dudhane and Utkarsh Shinde locked up Vikas Patil in the jail and did not allow him to come out as per the task. Vikas fought with them and questioned why they didn't want their own team member to win the captaincy. Vikas's friend Vishal Nikam went to help him out and opened the door of the jail by kicking.
- During one of the task, Sonali Patil and Mira Jagannath got into a physical fight. Mira informed Bigg Boss that she would hit Sonali if she continued to lock her in the task. Later, Bigg Boss had to ask both of them to stay away from each other.
- Jay Dudhane hid Adish Vaidya's pumpkin in the garden area. Jay held Adish and did not give him a chance to reach the winning line. Adish finding Jay's game unfair told Jay to be creative in task. This led to a heated argument between the two leading to them calling each other by inappropriate names. Adish also called out Jay for threatening him.

=== Season 4 ===
- Vikas Sawant and Rohit Shinde were seen getting embroiled in an argument regarding the Sugar and Ant task. While playing the task, the duo collided physically. Later, Rohit charged Vikas to beat him. The other members of the house stopped them and tried to resolve the quarrel between the two. Seeing the fight between them, Bigg Boss announced a punishment for them - putting both of them in jail.
- Rakhi Sawant was seen searching for her coffee as someone hid it inside the house. She threatened to create ruckus if she didn't find it. When Akshay Kelkar told her to do that, she started breaking utensils in the kitchen. She was also seen running towards Akshay Kelkar to attack him. Bigg Boss later nominated Rakhi as punishment for one week.
- Sawant and Amruta Dhongade indulged in unwanted physical fight. It all started when Amruta Dh locked Rakhi Sawant in the washroom when she went to have a bath. Amruta opened Rakhi's door later and denied doing anything. As a revenge, Rakhi went to the washroom, filled a bucket full of water and flipped the same on Amruta Dh while the latter was getting ready on her bed. Amruta Dh and Rakhi later got into a physical fight while the rest of the housemates tried to solve the fight. Bigg Boss later told them that it was a last warning for them.

=== Season 5 ===
- Jahnavi Killekar and Varsha Usgaonkar got into a heated argument. During the confrontation, Jahnavi criticized Varsha's acting career and her awards, going so far as to say that the government would regret giving her those honors. This incident sparked a major controversy outside the Bigg Boss house.
- All the housemates were given a task involving a doll. Team B accused Nikki Tamboli of damaging their doll and misbehaving with them, specifically breaking the doll's leg. After Usgaonkar reported this to the makers, Nikki made a controversial remark about Varsha's motherhood, saying, "Have you seen their feelings? How can you understand a mother's love?" This statement caused an uproar, leading to widespread backlash against Nikki.
- Jahnavi Killekar and Pandharinath Kamble had an argument where Jahnavi criticized him, claiming that he had been overacting throughout his entire career and was still doing so. This remark sparked a major controversy in the Marathi film industry.
- All the contestants were assigned the task of guarding a "magic diamond" to win the captaincy. During the task, Nikki Tamboli and Aarya Jadhao got into a heated argument that quickly turned physical. Aarya was guarding the diamond inside a room and blocked the door to keep Nikki out. Despite Nikki's attempts to convince her to let her in, Aarya refused. At this point, Arbaaz Patel stepped in to help Nikki forcibly opened the door, allowing her to enter. Following this, Nikki and Aarya began pushing each other at the doorway, while other housemates urged them to stop. The situation escalated further when Aarya slapped Nikki. Bigg Boss announced a punishment for Aarya by putting her in the jail, Later on the weekend she got ejected from the show for violating the show's rules.

=== Season 6 ===
- A controversy occurred during following a task in which contestants were required to mark the face of a non-participating housemate with a red cross sign. When it was Tanvi Kolte’s turn, she named Divya Shinde as the selected contestant. This led to an angry outburst from Divya, during which she allegedly issued threats of violence, including statements about attacking and killing fellow housemates. Despite Bigg Boss intervening and warning her, Divya reportedly continued to repeat that her statements were intended as threats. Subsequently, Bigg Boss summoned Divya and Raqesh Bapat to the confession room and offered Divya an opportunity to acknowledge and rectify her behaviour. However, Divya remained firm in her stance despite Raqesh advising her to exercise restraint in her language. The following day, in the presence of all housemates, Bigg Boss cited the seriousness of the incident and, citing the safety of the contestants, imposed a penalty by evicting Divya from the house with immediate effect.
- On Day 79, a heated clash broke out when Bapat nominated Vishal Kotian for discussing his personal life on TV. Vishal retaliated by threatening to bring up Raqesh’s divorce, leading to a face-to-face confrontation where Vishal kicked and pushed Raqesh. Bigg Boss immediately intervened for the physical violence; as punishment, Vishal was nominated for the entire season and barred from captaincy and the ticket to finale, while Raqesh was nominated for one week and lost his captaincy rights.
