= Bigg Boss Marathi season 2 =

Indian Marathi reality show

Bigg Boss Marathi
- Season 2
- Presented by: Mahesh Manjrekar
- No. of days: 98
- No. of housemates: 17
- Winner: Shiv Thakare
- Runner-up: Neha Shitole
- No. of episodes: 99

Release
- Original network: Colors Marathi; Voot Select
- Original release: 26 May – 1 September 2019

Season chronology
- ← Previous; Season 1 Next → Season 3

Bigg Boss Marathi 2 is the second season of the Bigg Boss Marathi of the reality television show Bigg Boss broadcast in India. The grand premiere was held on 26 May 2019 on Colors Marathi and Mahesh Manjrekar as the host with the tagline "Maza Ball, Mazi Bat, Maze Stump". The Grand Finale aired on 1 September 2019 and Shiv Thakare was declared as the winner and Neha Shitole as the runner-up.

== Production ==
=== Ratings ===
During lockdown in India due to the COVID-19 pandemic, in week 22 of 2020, the show's repeat telecast received 0.5 TRP by gaining fifth position in Top 5 Marathi TV shows.

=== Teaser ===
On 18 March 2019, the makers released the first promo on Colors Marathi. The start of season was delayed for a month due to Lok Sabha Elections 2019.

=== Eye logo ===
The border of the eye is golden and has a purple background. There is electricity type inside the eye and yellow lines come from the middle of the eye.

=== House ===
For the second season of Bigg Boss Marathi, a lavish house set was constructed in Goregaon Film City, Mumbai And this time the theme of the house is "Royal Wada". The prize money for the winner is Rs. 25 Lakhs.

Most of the rules are carried forward from the previous season, whereas "Adgalichi Kholi" (Jail) was introduced in Bigg Boss Marathi from this season.

=== Voting ===
As Bigg Boss online voting has begun, viewers can vote for their favorite contestant through Voot.

=== Special episode ===
- 26 May 2019 (Grand Premiere)
- 1 September 2019 (Grand Finale)

==== 2 hours ====
- 14–16 June 2019
- 29 June 2019
- 30 June 2019
- 5 July 2019
- 7 July 2019
- 19 July 2019
- 11 August 2019

== Housemates status ==
Sr no.	Housemate	Day entered	Day exited	Status
1	Shiv	Day 1	Day 98	Winner
2	Neha	Day 1	Day 98	1st Runner-up
3	Veena	Day 1	Day 98	2nd Runner-up
4	Shivani	Day 1	Day 21	Walked
4	Shivani	Day 44	Day 98	3rd Runner-up
5	Kishori	Day 1	Day 98	4th Runner-up
6	Aroh	Day 55	Day 98	5th runner-up
7	Abhijit B	Day 1	Day 27	Ejected
7	Abhijit B	Day 64	Day 92	Guest
8	Heena	Day 21	Day 84	Evicted
9	Abhijit K	Day 1	Day 77	Evicted
10	Rupali	Day 1	Day 70	Evicted
11	Maadhav	Day 1	Day 63	Evicted
12	Vaishali	Day 1	Day 56	Evicted
13	Surekha	Day 1	Day 42	Evicted
14	Parag	Day 1	Day 32	Ejected
15	Vidyadhar	Day 1	Day 29	Evicted
16	Digamber	Day 1	Day 21	Evicted
17	Maitthily	Day 1	Day 14	Evicted

== Housemates ==
=== Original entrants ===
15 Housemates entered on Day 1.

- Kishori Shahane - A popular Marathi film and television actress. She is married to Hindi filmmaker Deepak Balraj Vij. She has also appeared in Hindi films like Simran. She also played supporting roles in Shakti – Astitva Ke Ehsaas Ki and Ishq Mein Marjawan.
- Digamber Naik - A Marathi actor and comedian. He did many roles in films and television. He is known for his appearance in Fu Bai Fu.
- Neha Shitole - Film and television actress who appeared briefly in Anurag Kashyap and Vikramaditya Motwane's Sacred Games.
- Abhijit Bichukale - A politician.
- Veena Jagtap - Television actress. She is known for her lead role in Radha Prem Rangi Rangli.
- Vaishali Mhade - Singer, who won the Sa Re Ga Ma Pa Challenge 2009, also joined the reality show. She is also known for singing Bajirao Mastani's "Pinga" song with Shreya Ghoshal and Kalank's Ghar More Pardesiya.
- Shivani Surve - Television actress. She known for her lead role in Devyani and Jaana Na Dil Se Door.
- Shiv Thakare - Reality TV star, known for participating in MTV Roadies Rising.
- Surekha Punekar - Lavani dancer.
- Vidyadhar (Bappa) Joshi - Film actor. He is known for films like Ekta Ek Power, Marathi Tigers, and Double Seat.
- Parag Kanhere - A Celebrity Chef.
- Maitthily Jawkar - She is one of the most famous actresses in Marathi cinema. She rules the rural part of Maharashtra.
- Rupali Bhosale - Television actress. She known for her performance in Sony Sab's Badi Door Se Aaye Hain. She also did roles in Man Udhan Varyache, Don Kinare Doghi Aapan, Shejari Shejari Pakke Shejari, etc.
- Maadhav Deochake - A Marathi actor known for appearing in the Star Plus show Hamari Devrani and film Chintamani. He also did roles in Saraswati, Devyani, Tuza Maza Breakup, etc.
- Abhijit Kelkar - A Marathi film actor known for Me Shivajiraje Bhosale Boltoy and Sound of Heaven: The Story of Balgandharva.

=== Wild-Card entrants ===
- Heena Panchal - Bollywood dancer. She is most famous for her item songs.
- Aroh Welankar - Marathi movie actor known for Films like Rege & Ghanta.

== Weekly summary ==
The main events in the house are summarised in the table below. A typical week began with nominations, followed by the daily task, and then the eviction of a housemate during the Saturday episode. Evictions, tasks, and other events for a particular week are noted in order of sequence.

Week 1	Entrances	On Day 0, Kishori, Neha, Digambar, Abhijit B, Shiv, Vaishali, Veena, Shivani, Maithily, Rupali, Maadhav, Vidyadhar, Surekha, Parag and Abhijit K entered the house.
Week 1	Daily Tasks	On Day 1, Bigg Boss gave a task to all housemates to select non-deserving housemates. From the result of the task, all housemates were selected Shiv, Maitthily, Vaishali and Abhijit B as non-deserving housemates.; On Day 2, Bigg Boss gave a nominations task to all housemates they have to sacrifice their favorite things and save themselves from nomination.
Week 1	Captaincy Task	—N/a
Week 1	Nomination	Shiv, Neha and Shivani
Week 1	Exits	No Elimination
Week 2	Daily Tasks	Popat Pinjara (Parrot Cage); On Day 8, Bigg Boss gave Popat Pinjara tasks to everyone. Everyone took each other's parrots and when the buzzer sounded, someone would go and put the parrot in the cage and the housemates would be nominated.: Chor Baazar (Thief Market); On Day 9, Bigg Boss gave everyone Chor Baazar task. In this task, two teams are divided and one team is a thief and the other is a cop. Thieves used to steal things from the house and escape from the cops.
Week 2	Captaincy Task	Captaincy contenders: No contenders; Winner: Shiv
Week 2	Jail	Veena and Shivani
Week 2	Nomination	Abhijit K, Maadhav, Maithily, Neha, Parag and Veena
Week 2	Exits	On Day 14, Maithily Jawkar was evicted from the house after facing public vote.
Week 3	Daily Tasks	B.B Mithaiwala (B.B Confectioner ); Bigg Boss had given a new nomination task which was named B. B. Mithaiwala. In this task, each housemate had a dessert and each member went to the activity area and poured the dessert of the housemates who they wanted to nominate.: Shaala Sutli Pati Phutli (School Skipped Slate Exploded); Big Boss had given housemates a new task called Shaala Sutli Pati Phutli. One team was to play the role of student and the other team was to play the role of teacher. Each buzzer had a new teacher's hour and at the end of the hour, each teacher failed one student. The student who failed was eliminated from the race for captaincy.
Week 3	Captaincy Task	No Captain
Week 3	Nomination	Abhijit B, Digambar, Kishori, Maadhav, Neha and Parag
Week 3	Exits	Against Public vote; On Day 21, Digambar Naik was evicted from the house after facing public votes.: Walked; On Day 20, Shivani Surve left the house due to her poor health conditions.
Week 3	Entrance	On Day 20, Heena Panchal entered as First wild card entry and replacing Shivani Surve.
Week 4	Daily Tasks	Sheras Savva Sher (The Father of Lion for the Lion); Bigg Boss announces the nomination task, Sheras Savva Sher. According to this task, the housemates are asked to stand on a particular number from 1 to 10 considering their contribution to the BB house. Shiv being nominated earlier, Vaishali being the captain, and Heena being the wildcard entrant remain out from this task.: Ek Daav Dhobi Pachad (An Innings Launderer); Bigg Boss then announces a new task Ek Daav Dhobi Pachad, for which the housemates are divided into two teams. According to the task, the two teams had to wash, dry, and iron the clothes. Following the steps, the team, which has the maximum number of clothes after the buzzer rings, will win the particular round. Neha and Vidyadhar become the managers of the two teams.
Week 4	Captaincy Task	Bigg Boss announces the captaincy task. Digambar and Vaishali are the two contenders for the task, but as Digambar got evicted last week, Bigg Boss asks all the housemates to nominate a contestant who can play the captaincy task. Bigg Boss then announces that the captaincy task will be between three contestants and the one who goes into the confession room first after the buzzer will be the third contestant.: Sahi Re Sahi (That's Sign); Bigg Boss announces the task named Sahi Re Sahi. According to this, all three contenders have to sign on the whiteboard and the one who does maximum signatures will be winning the captaincy task. Vaishali wins the task to become the new captain of the house. She gets charge of the captaincy room. Lastly, Parag decides to nominate Veena and Abhijeet K for eviction and decides to support Neha. Parag gets teary-eyed as he discusses the same with Neha. He also tells Rupali and Kishori that he will be forming a new group in the BB house. Captaincy contenders: Vaishali, Vidyadhar and Abhijit K Winner: Vaishali
Week 4	Nomination	Parag, Shiv, Surekha, Veena, Abhijit B and Vidyadhar
Week 4	Exits	On Day 28, Vidyadhar Joshi was evicted from the house after facing public votes.; On Day 26, Abhijit B got arrested from the house as he was involved in cheque bounce case.
Week 5	Daily Tasks	Hishob Paap Punyacha (Calculations of Sins and Virtues); Bigg Boss announces a new nomination task - ‘Hishob Paap Punyacha’. Neha and Shiv are safe from the nomination process. Therefore, Shiv becomes the judge whereas Neha becomes his advisor. Also, Maadhav is made the second advisor of the judge. According to this task, after each buzzer, Bigg Boss will announce two names, who will have to debate on why they are eligible to stay in the BB house.: Tikel To Tikel (Survived Who Will Survive); Bigg Boss then announces a new task ‘Tikel To Tikel’. For the task, the housemates are divided into two teams and after the buzzer, Team A starts performing the task and Shiv sits on the throne first. Team B tries to irritate him so that he leaves the throne which would help them to win the task. Rupali protects Shiv during the task whereas Heena sits on his lap and tries to seduce him so that he quits the task.
Week 5	Nomination	Heena, Kishori, Rupali, Veena and Parag
Week 5	Captaincy Task	Pyramid Task: Bigg Boss later announces the captaincy task. According to this task, the two contenders - Kishori and Shiv are given 10 paper boxes each and asked to make a pyramid out of that. The supporters of both the contenders have to break the pyramid of the opponent team. Shiv wins this task and becomes the captain of the house for the second time.; Captaincy contenders: Kishori and Shiv Winner: Shiv
Week 5	Exits	On Day 36, Parag Kanhere was ejected by housemates as he is physical in task with Vaishali Mhade and Neha Shitole.
Week 6	Daily Tasks	Bigg Boss calls everyone in confession room to nominate.: Atithi Devo Bhava (Guests is God); Bigg Boss announces a new task named ‘Atithi Devo Bhava’. The entire house turns into a BB hotel and the housemates are divided into two teams for the task. Veena and Neha become the managers of the two teams respectively and divide the duties amongst the team members. Bigg Boss then invites the former contestants, Pushkar Jog, Smita Gondkar, Sai Lokur, and Sharmishtha Raut as the guests in the BB house. The guests are supposed to rate both the teams according to the service they provide.
Week 6	Captaincy Task	Dhar Pakad (Hold On): Bigg Boss announces a captaincy task named 'Dhar Pakad'. According to this task, the two teams from 'Tikel Toh Tikel' task had to select a member each from their teams to contest in the captaincy task. As per the task, the two contenders for captaincy are asked to hold themselves onto the poles fixed in the swimming pool. While the rest of the housemates have to throw balls and splash water on them.; Captaincy contenders: Maadhav and Veena Winner: Maadhav
Week 6	Nomination	Heena, Kishori, Rupali, Surekha, Vaishali
Week 6	Luxury Budget Task	Suddenly, the entire Bigg Boss house starts shaking and everyone gets panicked. Bigg Boss asks all the housemates to gather in the girls' bedroom. Some of them feel that it is due to heavy rainfall, but Bigg Boss announces that it was part of the new task. Bigg Boss asks the housemates that if such a panic-stricken situation occurs inside the BB house, then the contestants have to individually name one person with whom they would prefer to stay. Also, they are asked to individually name the person with whom they don't want to be with.
Week 6	Exits	On Day 42, Surekha Punekar was evicted from the house after facing public votes.
Week 7	Punishment	Veena, Shiv, Abhijeet and Vaishali discuss the nominations for eviction. Bigg Boss warns them against having any discussion about the nomination. The housemates continue to break the rules of the Bigg Boss house by not wearing the mic, sleeping during the daytime, etc. Thus, Bigg Boss asks all the housemates to gather in the living area. Bigg Boss firstly announces the names of the top 9 contestants that he is ashamed of. Bigg Boss accuses them of disrespecting the rules of the house and this leaves the housemates deeply shocked. Later, Bigg Boss punishes the housemates by confiscating all the luxury items from the house. Aroh Velankar enters as a wildcard and Shivani Surve re enters the house again on Day 43.
Week 7	Daily Tasks	Bus Stop; Bigg Boss announces a new nomination task. According to the task, after every buzzer, two contestants will be asked to visit the garden area. They will be given half part of a bus ticket. The setup of a bus stop has been installed and each contestant will have to earn the other half of the ticket from their contenders during the task.: Ek Daav Bhutacha (An Inning Ghost); Bigg Boss announces a weekly task for the housemates named Ek Daav Bhutacha. For the task, a haunted house is made in the garden area and the housemates are divided into two teams. Kishori is chosen as the supervisor of this task. The members of team A (Rupali, Heena, Neha, and Maadhav) become the hunters whereas Team B members (Shiv, Veena, Abhijeet, and Vaishali) become the ghosts. According to this task, team B members are initially locked inside the haunted house and their eyes are closed whereas team A members are asked to hide the dolls which have the pictures of the members of Team B. Team B members are asked to search their dolls and get into the safe zone. The one who would reach the safe zone last will lose that particular round of the task.
Week 7	Captaincy Task	Phone Call; Bigg Boss announces the captaincy task. For this, the housemates are divided into two teams - Team Rupali and Team Abhijeet K. According to this task, the contender is given a phone and the second phone is with the opposite team's members. The opposite team members are asked to instigate the contender for captaincy so that he/she disconnects the call. Maadhav becomes the supervisor of this task.: Captaincy contenders: Abhijit K and Rupali; Winner: Abhijit K
Week 7	Nomination	Heena, Kishori, Maadhav, Neha, Rupali, Vaishali and Veena
Week 7	Exits	No Elimination
Week 8	Twist	When the store room's bell rings, Abhijit goes inside to check. There is a doctor present inside who asks Abhijit about his health. Suddenly, four random guys enter the storeroom and take away Abhijit from there. Abhijit keeps screaming, housemates panic hearing him shout. Bigg Boss then announces that the house is in danger as Abhijit has been kidnapped, but later everyone realizes that it's just a part of their new task. Abhijit is taken to the secret room and is told by Bigg Boss that he will play an important role in the upcoming task.
Week 8	Daily Tasks	Nomination Special; Bigg Boss announces that Veena and Rupali have to convince a male and a female contestant from their respective teams to get nominated for eviction in the upcoming weeks. If Rupali's team members get nominated for the maximum number of weeks, then she wins the task and vice versa and lastly, Bigg Boss announces the names of the nominated contestants -Kishori, Veena, Shiv, Vaishali, Neha, Heena, and Maadhav.: Murder Mystery; Bigg Boss announces the new task 'Murder Mystery' for which the housemates are called one-by-one into the confession room. To decide which role they will play amongst the murderer and the citizen each one is asked to select a gun and shoot at an empty box. If the bullet comes out, then that person becomes the murderer otherwise the person becomes the citizen. Shiv and Shivani are the murderers whereas the rest are citizens. Abhijit K is asked to guide the murderers about how to plot someone's murder symbolically.
Week 8	Captaincy Task	Samudra Manthan (Churning The Sea); Bigg Boss announces the captaincy task named ‘Samudra Manthan’. In this Rupali and Veena play against each other to win the captaincy title. The housemates are divided into two teams. Kishori, Shiv, Abhijeet, and Vaishali are in Veena's team whereas Heena, Neha, Maadhav, and Shivani are in Rupali's team. During the first task, the member from each team has to greet the opposite team members lying on the floor. Neha from Rupali's team and Shiv from Veena's team play the task. Finally, Rupali wins round 1. Later in round 2, one member from each team has to get a permanent tattoo mentioning the name of the contestant of their team fighting for the captaincy task. Veena's name is tattooed by Shiv and Rupali's name is inked by Heena. Both the teams get one point each in this task. Lastly, Bigg Boss asks one member from each team to get inside the bathtub full of muddy water. Vaishali from Veena's team and Maadhav from Rupali's team decide to perform the task. Captaincy contenders: Rupali and Veena Winner: Rupali
Week 8	Entrance	On Day 55, Aroh Welankar entered as second wild card entry.
Week 8	Nomination	Heena, Kishori, Shiv, Neha, Vaishali, Maadhav, Veena
Week 8	Exits	On Day 56, Vaishali Mhade was evicted from the house after facing public votes.
Week 9	Daily Tasks	Ekala Chalo Re (Let's Go Alone); Bigg Boss later announces a new nomination task named Ekala Chalo Re. Shivani, being the captain, and Aroh, being the wild card entrant remain safe from the nomination task. Bigg Boss asks Shivani to supervise the task whereas Aroh is asked to help Shivani. 3 rings of different colors are kept in the garden area and after every buzzer, the contestants are supposed to walk on those rings. Also, they have to follow Shivani's instructions simultaneously. Shivani is asked to instruct them and command, ‘Walk fast’, ‘Walk slowly’ and ‘Turn’. The contestants are also asked to hold a bowl full of water in their hands and the one, who spills the maximum amount of water in a particular round, will be declared as nominated.: Saat Baara (Property); Bigg Boss announces a weekly task named Saat Baara. For this task, the housemates are divided into two teams. Shivani, Neha, Maadhav, Rupali, and Shiv form Team A whereas Veena, Abhijeet, Aroh, Kishori, and Heena form Team B. Team A is asked to play the role of farmers whereas Team B is asked to become the insects. In every round, the farmer's team has to indulge in plant saplings and also try to get maximum land under their control. At the same time, 2 members from Team B have to destroy the saplings and two other members have to get the maximum land under their control.
Week 9	Captaincy Task	Halla Bol (Speak Attack); Bigg Boss announces the captaincy task named, Halla Bol. As Abhijeet performed excellently in the murder mystery task, he is selected as the first candidate for the captaincy task whereas Shivani became the second contestant. She killed a maximum number of people (using a symbolic way) and survived till the last during the murder mystery task. For the Halla Bol task, the entire BB house turned into the Lilliput Kingdom. The housemates were divided into two teams. Shiv, Madhav, Kishori, and Neha belonged to Shivani's team whereas Rupali, Veena, Aroh, and Heena belonged to Abhijeet's team. Except for Abhijeet and Shivani, all the other contestants are asked to become the dwarfs by crawling on their knees. While playing the task, both teams use physical strength. Seeing the same, Shivani gets a panic attack. Towards the end of the task, she starts crying, but finally, Shivani is declared as the new captain of the house. Captaincy contenders: Shivani and Abhijit K Winner: Shivani
Week 9	Nomination	Heena, Kishori, Maadhav, Neha, Veena
Week 9	Luxury Budget Task	BB Matrimony; Bigg Boss announces a new task in which Shivani and Aroh are made the matchmakers of the Bigg Boss Marathi matrimony whereas, Shiv and Veena are the two lovers. The rest of the housemates are divided into two teams - Shiv's family and Veena's family. The bride's and the groom's family is asked to put their side in front of the matchmakers and prove how another side is creating problems for the couple, but after a huge discussion from both the sides, the matchmakers conclude by saying, the bride's side has been creating more number of problems between the couple. Overall, the day ended on a lighter mode and all the contestants enjoyed the task.
Week 9	Exits	On Day 63, Maadhav Deochake was evicted from the house after facing public votes.
Week 10	Daily Tasks	Freeze Release; Bigg Boss announces that due to some technical reason, the freeze and release task would not happen. On hearing that, all the housemates get disheartened, but Bigg Boss asks them to write letters to their family members. After everyone writes the letters, Bigg Boss soon starts with the freeze and release task. Later, Bigg Boss gave them a surprise and the first member enters the house and that's Kishori Shahane's son Bobby. Bobby firstly speaks to his mother and gives some tips on how she should play her game. Also, he requests everyone to respect his mother in the house and the series continues.
Week 10	Entrance	Abhijit B re-entered the house as a guest.
Week 10	Captaincy Task	Tahanlela Kawla (Thirsty Crow); Neha and Abhijeet B are safe from this task as Maadhav used his special power after the eviction to save Neha whereas Abhijeet has just entered the house. According to this new task, the contestants are asked to unanimously decide 2 names in the top 2 and the bottom 2. During the discussion, the contestants again get into an argument and until the time is over, they take only Abhijeet Kelkar's name in the top 2. Lastly, Bigg Boss announces that Abhijeet Kelkar (decided by the contestants unanimously) and Aroh Welankar (gets maximum votes in the bottom 2 category) will be the two contenders of the captaincy task. Bigg Boss gives a new captaincy task to the housemates. Abhijeet Kelkar and Aroh fight for the captaincy whereas the housemates are divided into two teams. Veena, Shivani, Neha, and Abhijeet B are the supporters of Aroh whereas Kishori, Rupali, Shiv, and Heena are the supporters of Abhijeet K. The name of this task is ‘Tahanlela Kawla’. In this task, both the teams are given two pots individually and are asked to fill the pots with the stones so that the water in the pot overflows. Captaincy contenders: Aroh and Abhijit K Winner: Abhijit K
Week 10	Nomination	Bigg Boss given task to the housemates is of the nomination process. Bigg Boss announces that all the housemates except Neha and Abhijeet K are nominated and these two are given the special power to save some of the nominated contestants. Shiv, Kishori, Shivani are saved by the two whereas Veena, Heena, Rupali, Aroh and Abhijeet B remain nominated.
Week 10	Exits	On Day 70, Rupali Bhosale was evicted from the house after facing public votes.
Week 11	Daily Tasks	Ek Khoon Maaf (One Murder Forgive); the task named ‘Ek Khoon Maaf’ is announced by Bigg Boss. According to the rules of the task, the contestants are asked to come in pairs and bid an amount to nominate one of the contestants. The highest bidding person would get the choice of nominating the contestant of his / her choice. Abhijit is asked to collect the highest bid amount from the contestants. Most importantly, the contestants can bid any amount between 50 thousand to 5 lakhs but at the same time, they are supposed to keep in mind that the amount would be deducted from the final prize money of this season.: Choravar Mor (Peacock On The Thief); housemates get a surprise and some celebrity guests enter the BB house. Popular actors Pushkar Shotri, Sanjay Narvekar, Aniket Vishwasrao, Mrinmayee Godbole and Prasad Oak meet all the contestants and wish them for winning the trophy. A fun robbery task is announced by Bigg Boss. For this, the housemates are divided into two teams and as the guests will be continuing their stay for one more day, There are two teams- one of which is the 'smuggler team', while the other is the 'spy team'. The smuggler team is asked to hide a diamond from the BB museum whereas the spy team is asked to find out the hidden gem and put it inside the safe before the buzzer.
Week 11	Captaincy Task	Khamb Khamb (Pillar Pillar); they are given a new captaincy task named ‘Khamb Khamb’. Bigg Boss announces that except Heena, all the contestants will have to do the task. Heena had got immunity for a week as Rupali saved her while leaving the show. According to the new task, there are colorful pillars placed in the garden area. After each buzzer, the contestants have to find one pillar and place the sticker of their name on it. Also, the contestants are asked to take different pillars in each round. Heena is the supervisor of the task. Captaincy contenders: Abhijit K, Abhijit B, Kishori, Veena, Aroh Welankar, Shiv, Neha Winner: Neha
Week 11	Nomination	Abhijit K, Kishori, Shiv, Aroh
Week 11	Exits	On Day 77, Abhijit K was evicted from the house after facing public votes.
Week 12	Daily Tasks	Juna Gadi Nava Rajya (Old King New Kingdom); Bigg Boss Marathi 1 winner Megha Dhade makes an entry with her co-contestants Resham Tipnis and Sushant Shelar. Soon after that, Bigg Boss announces a new task 'Juna Gadi Nava Rajya'. The guests become the king and queen for this task whereas the housemates are divided into three teams - Team Megha, Team Resham, and Team Sushant. Neha and Shiv are in Resham's team, Shivani and Aroh are in Megha's team whereas, Veena and Heena are in Sushant's team. Megha and Resham's team perform the first task to conquer the bathroom area. And this task is won by Megha's team. But when Megha's team goes near the bathroom area, their previous territory is conquered by Sushant's team.
Week 12	Captaincy Task	Mhataricha Boot (Old Lady's Shoe); Bigg Boss gives a new captaincy task to the contestants, but Bigg Boss announces that Abhijit B will not be playing the captaincy task as he keeps breaking the rules in the house. In this task, the contestants have to decide the two contenders for the captaincy and so, each contestant has to spray the black paint on the co-contestants picture whom he/she doesn't want to become the captain. Finally, Bigg Boss announces Shiv and Kishori's names as the contenders for captaincy. Bigg Boss announces the captaincy task. Shiv and Kishori are the two contenders whereas the other housemates are divided into two teams. Shivani, Abhijit B, and Neha are in Shiv's team whereas Veena, Heena, and Aroh are in Kishori's team. The name of this task is ‘Mhataricha Boot’ and thus a huge shoe is kept in the garden area. According to this task, one team is asked to lace the shoe and at the same time, the opposite team members have to stop them from doing this. Captaincy contenders: Shiv, Kishori Winner: Kishori
Week 12	Nomination	Heena, Shiv
Week 12	Luxury Budget Task	Breaking News; Bigg Boss announces a new luxury budget task - ‘Breaking News’. In this task, the housemates are asked to create sensational news in the BB house whereas Abhijit B is asked to cover the news segments. Abhijit B plays the role of a reporter, whereas Kishori plays an anchor. The contestants create a lot of breaking news but only Top 2 or Top 3 sensational news are given the points.
Week 12	Exits	On Day 84, Heena Panchal was evicted from the house after facing public votes.
Week 13	Daily Tasks	Bichukale Ki Adaalat; A new task ‘Bichukale Ki Adaalat’ is announced by Bigg Boss. Abhijit B is made the lawyer in the task. According to the rules of the task, Abhijeet B is asked to accuse the housemates of different allegations. On the other hand, the housemates are asked to defend themselves.
Week 13	Sponsored Task	Lagori; Bigg Boss gives announces a new task in which the housemates are divided into two teams. Shiv, Veena, and Abhijeet are in one team whereas Neha, Aroh, and Shivani are in the other team. Kishori is the supervisor for this task. The two teams play the game of Lagori and Shiv, Veena and Abhijit's team win the task. Winner: Shiv, Veena, Abhijit B
Week 13	Luxury Budget Task	BB Birthday Party; BB Birthday Party. The housemates are asked to celebrate the birthday of Bigg Boss with a grand party. At this party, the first task is a dance performance. Each contestant is given a different song and they are supposed to dance once their song plays.
Week 13	Nomination	Shiv, Kishori, Veena, Aroh
Week 13	Ticket to Finale	Bigg Boss announces the ‘Ticket To Finale’ task in which the evicted contestants are called to play an important role in the task. Each evicted contestant has to take the names of any two contestants whom they feel should win the show. Bigg Boss later announces Neha's name for getting the ‘Ticket To Finale’ as she gets the maximum number of votes and the second name announced by Bigg Boss announces is Shivani. Bigg Boss then says that the rest of the contestants - Shiv, Veena, Kishori, and Aroh are nominated for the week.: Aapli Rashi; Later, Bigg boss announces a new ticket to finale task in which the housemates are asked to decide their value in the house. After deciding everyone's value in the house, Bigg boss announces a new task, according to which, one contestant among Shiv, Veena, Aroh, and Kishori can get a ‘Ticket To Finale’ along with Shivani and Neha (they have already got the ‘Ticket To Finale’). For this new task, each contestant has to give up his value (money) earlier decided and get nominated. There are three buzzers and the one who remains last will get ‘Ticket To Finale’.
Week 13	Exits	No Elimination
Week 14	Daily Tasks	Journey of Bichukale; The housemates are in for a surprise as Bigg Boss announces the last weekly activity titled Abhijit B! As it is all about Abhijit B, the housemates make him the center of attraction by reciting poems and dedicating dance performances in his honor. They also get to know him better as Aroh Welankar interviews him.: BB Patrakaar Parishad; Reporters from different media platform have come to the house to ask questions to the remaining contestants.: BB Journey; Bigg Boss has shown the journeys of finalists which started from Shiv, Kishori, Neha, Aroh, Shivani, and Veena.
Week 14	Other Task	BB Awards Night; Ex-housemates entered the house once again. Bigg Boss announces the task called BB Awards Night, where some quirky awards are given out to the housemates in various categories.
Week 14	Exits	Abhijit B quits the show as he was only guest for few weeks.
Week 14	Grand Finale	Rank / Status / Housemate; 1 / Winner / Shiv Thakare; 2 / 1st runner-up / Neha Shitole; 3 / 2nd runner-up / Veena Jagtap; 4 / 3rd runner-up / Shivani Surve; 5 / 4th runner-up / Kishori Shahane; 6 / 5th runner-up / Aroh Welankar

== Nominations table ==
	Week 1	Week 2	Week 3		Week 4	Week 5	Week 6	Week 7	Week 8	Week 9	Week 10	Week 11	Week 12	Week 13	Week 14 Finale Week			
Nominees for Captaincy	No; Captain	Neha; Shiv	No; Captain		Abhijit K ~~Digamber~~; Vaishali; Vidyadhar	Kishori; Shiv	Maadhav; Veena	Abhijit K Rupali	Rupali; Veena	Abhijit K Shivani	Aroh; Abhijit K	Abhijit B Abhijit K Aroh; Kishori; Neha; Shiv; Shivani; Veena	Kishori; Shiv	No; Captain				
House Captain	No; Captain	Shiv	No; Captain		Vaishali	Shiv	Maadhav	Abhijit K	Rupali	Shivani	Abhijit K	Neha	Kishori	No; Captain				
Captain's Nominations	No; Captain	Not eligible	No; Captain		No; Nominations	Heena; Kishori; Parag; Rupali; Veena	Surekha; Kishori	Not eligible	Shiv; Vaishali; Abhijit K Veena	Not eligible	Shiv; Kishori (to save)	Not eligible	Shivani; Veena (to save)	No; Captain				
Vote to:	Save	Evict			Rank	None	Evict	None	Evict	Ring	Save	Evict	Save	Save	WIN			
	Nominated	House; Captain	Digamber; Neha	Maadhav; Abhijit B	8 out of 13 votes for Nominated	House; Captain	Kishori; Surekha	Safe; Heena Accepted Nomination	Neha; Maadhav; Heena; Kishori	In	Not eligible	Not eligible	Heena; Veena	Not eligible	Winner (Day 98)			
	Nominated	Maitthily	Shiv; Kishori	Maadhav; Abhijit B	3	Safe	Kishori; Surekha	No Decision; Nominated with Veena	Vaishali; Shiv; Heena; Veena	Out	Shivani	House; Captain	Aroh; Shivani	Not eligible	1st runner-up (Day 98)			
	Not eligible	Maadhav	Neha; Digamber	Maadhav; Abhijit B	6	Nominated against Heena	Heena; Abhijit K	No Decision; Nominated with Neha	Heena; Neha; Kishori; Maadhav	Out	Not eligible	Not eligible	Heena; Neha	Not eligible	2nd runner-up (Day 98)			
	Nominated	Not eligible	Kishori; Parag	Maadhav; Abhijit B	Walked (Day 21)				Kishori; Shiv; Vaishali; Veena	House; Captain	Not eligible	Shiv	Aroh; Neha	Not eligible	3rd runner-up (Day 98)			
	Not eligible		Digamber; Neha	Maadhav; Abhijit B	2	Nominated against Surekha	Vaishali; Surekha	No Decision; Nominated with Vaishali	Abhijit K Shiv; Vaishali; Veena	Out	Not eligible	Aroh	House; Captain	Not eligible	4th runner-up (Day 98)			
	Not In House									Exempt	Not eligible	Abhijit K	Neha; Shivani	Not eligible	5th runner-up (Day 98)			
Abhijit B			Parag; Neha	Maadhav; Abhijit B	10	Ejected (Day 27)					Guest (Day 64-92)							
					Exempt	Nominated against Maadhav	Kishori; Surekha	Accepted Nomination against Shiv	Veena; Shiv; Neha; Kishori	Out	Not eligible	Kishori	Aroh; Veena	Evicted (Day 84)	Evicted (Day 84)			
					Exempt	Nominated against Maadhav	Kishori; Surekha	Accepted Nomination against Shiv	Veena; Shiv; Neha; Kishori	Out	Not eligible	Kishori	Aroh; Veena	Neha; Veena	Evicted (Day 84)			
Abhijit K	Not eligible	Not eligible	Parag; Kishori	Maadhav; Abhijit B	1	Saved against Parag	Kishori; Rupali	House; Captain	Kishori; Heena; Maadhav; Neha	In	House; Captain	Not eligible	Evicted (Day 77)	Neha; Shiv				
Rupali	Not eligible	Not eligible	Neha; Digamber	Maadhav; Abhijit B	4	Nominated against Vaishali	Heena; Vaishali	No Decision; Nominated with Maadhav	House; Captain	In	Not eligible	Heena (to save)	Evicted (Day 70)	Neha; Shivani				
Maadhav	Not eligible	Veena	Veena; Parag	Maadhav; Abhijit B	5	Saved against Heena	House; Captain	No Decision; Nominated with Rupali	Veena; Shiv; Vaishali; Abhijit K	Out	Neha (to save)	Evicted (Day 63)		Neha; Shivani				
Vaishali	Not eligible	Not eligible	Kishori; Parag	Maadhav; Abhijit B	House; Captain	Saved against Rupali	Kishori; Rupali	No Decision; Nominated with Kishori	Kishori; Neha; Maadhav; Shivani	Evicted (Day 56)				Neha; Shiv	Evicted (Day 56)			
Surekha	Not eligible	Not eligible	Parag; Shiv	Maadhav; Abhijit B	9	Saved against Kishori	Kishori; Shiv	Evicted (Day 42)						Neha; Shivani	Evicted (Day 42)			
Parag	Not eligible	Neha	Neha; Digamber	Maadhav; Abhijit B	7	Nominated against Abhijit K	Ejected (Day 32)											
Vidyadhar	Not eligible	Not eligible	Kishori; Veena	Maadhav; Abhijit B	8	Neha (to save)	Evicted (Day 28)							Neha; Shivani	Evicted (Day 28)			
Digamber	Not eligible	Not eligible	Kishori; Veena	Maadhav; Abhijit B	Evicted (Day 21)									Neha; Shivani	Evicted (Day 21)			
Maitthily	Not eligible	Not eligible	Evicted (Day 14)											Shiv; Veena	Evicted (Day 14)			
Notes	none		1		2	3	None	4	5	6	7	8	None	9	None			
Against Public Vote	Neha; Shiv; Shivani	Abhijit K Maadhav; Maitthily; Neha; Parag; Veena	Abhijit B Digamber; Kishori; Maadhav; Neha; Parag		~~Abhijit B~~; Parag; Shiv; Surekha; Veena; Vidyadhar	Heena; Kishori; ~~Parag~~; Rupali; Veena	Heena; Kishori; Rupali; Surekha; Vaishali	Heena; Kishori; Madhav; Neha; Rupali; Vaishali; Veena	Heena; Kishori; Maadhav; Neha; Shiv; Vaishali; Veena	Heena; Kishori; Maadhav; Neha; Veena	Abhijit B Aroh; Heena; Rupali; Veena	Abhijit K Aroh; Kishori; Shiv	Heena; Shiv	Aroh; Kishori; Shiv; Veena	Aroh; Kishori; Neha; Shiv; Shivani; Veena			
Walked	None		Shivani		None													
Ejected	None				Abhijit B	Parag	None											
Evicted	No; Eviction	Maitthily	Digamber		Vidyadhar	No; Eviction	Surekha	No; Eviction	Vaishali	Maadhav	Rupali	Abhijit K	Heena	No; Eviction	Aroh	Kishori	Shivani	Veena
Evicted	No; Eviction	Maitthily	Digamber		Vidyadhar	No; Eviction	Surekha	No; Eviction	Vaishali	Maadhav	Rupali	Abhijit K	Heena	No; Eviction	Neha		Shiv	

indicates that the Housemate was directly nominated for eviction.
indicates that the Housemate was immune prior to nominations.
indicates the winner.
indicates the first runner up.
indicates the second runner up.
indicates the third runner up.
indicates the contestant has been evicted.
indicates the contestant walked out due to emergency.
indicates the contestant has been ejected.
house captain.
indicates the contestant is nominated.
Abhijit B's Team (Week 1-2)
Vaishali's Team (Week 1-2)
Not in House (Week 1-2)

=== Nomination notes ===
- ^note 1: On Day 20, Shivani walked out from the house due to health issues. Heena entered the house as the first wild card Entry.
- ^note 2: Abhijeet B was arrested from the house following a court case.
- ^note 3: Parag was removed from the house because of violence.
- ^note 4: On Day 48, Shivani re-entered the house.
- ^note 5: On Day 55, Aroh entered the house as 2nd wild-card contestant.
- ^note 6: Aroh murdered Neha while entering in the House, as a part of his entry.
- ^note 7: Maadhav saved Neha for week 10 after elimination
- ^note 8: On Day 64, Abhijit B re-entered the house as guest contestant.
- ^note 9: On Day 86, Ex-contestants nominated members for final week.

== Guest appearances ==
=== Through Direct Contact ===
Week(s)	Day(s)	Guest(s)	Purpose of visit
Week 1	Day 0	Harshad Naybal	For entertaining
Week 1	Day 0	Vaishali's daughter	To support her mother
Week 1	Day 0	Sanket Bhosale (Rupali's brother)	To support her sister
Week 5	Day 38-39	Sai Lokur	As Guest in BB Hotel Task
Week 5	Day 38-39	Smita Gondkar	As Guest in BB Hotel Task
Week 5	Day 38-39	Pushkar Jog	As Guest in BB Hotel Task
Week 5	Day 38-39	Sharmishtha Raut	As Guest in BB Hotel Task
Week 10	Day 67-68	Bobby Vij (Kishori's son)	To surprise contestants in statue task
Week 10	Day 67-68	Nachiket Purnapatre (Neha's husband)	To surprise contestants in statue task
Week 10	Day 67-68	Trupti Kelkar (Abhijeet K's wife)	To surprise contestants in statue task
Week 10	Day 67-68	Radha-Malhar (Abhijeet K's children)	To surprise contestants in statue task
Week 10	Day 67-68	Mangesh Surve (Shivani's father)	To surprise contestants in statue task
Week 10	Day 67-68	Ankita Shingvi (Aroh's wife)	To surprise contestants in statue task
Week 10	Day 67-68	Asha Thakare (Shiv's mother)	To surprise contestants in statue task
Week 10	Day 67-68	Manisha Thakare (Shiv's sister)	To surprise contestants in statue task
Week 10	Day 67-68	Sanket Bhosale (Rupali's brother)	To surprise contestants in statue task
Week 10	Day 67-68	Priya Panchal (Heena's mother)	To surprise contestants in statue task
Week 10	Day 67-68	Nirmala Jagtap (Veena's mother)	To surprise contestants in statue task
Week 10	Day 67-68	Abhijeet B's Mother	To surprise contestants in statue task
Week 10	Day 67-68	Alankruta Bichukale (Abhijeet B's wife)	To surprise contestants in statue task
Week 11	Day 73-74	Sanjay Narvekar	For Promotion of "Ye Re Ye Re Paisa 2" & To Perform task "Choravar Mor"
Week 11	Day 73-74	Mrinmayee Godbole	For Promotion of "Ye Re Ye Re Paisa 2" & To Perform task "Choravar Mor"
Week 11	Day 73-74	Pushkar Shrotri	For Promotion of "Ye Re Ye Re Paisa 2" & To Perform task "Choravar Mor"
Week 11	Day 73-74	Aniket Vishwasrao	For Promotion of "Ye Re Ye Re Paisa 2" & To Perform task "Choravar Mor"
Week 11	Day 73-74	Prasad Oak	For Promotion of "Ye Re Ye Re Paisa 2" & To Perform task "Choravar Mor"
Week 12	Day 77	Salman Khan	To interact with contestants
Week 12	Day 80-82	Megha Dhade	To Perform task "Juna Gadi Nava Rajya"
Week 12	Day 80-82	Resham Tipnis	To Perform task "Juna Gadi Nava Rajya"
Week 12	Day 80-82	Sushant Shelar	To Perform task "Juna Gadi Nava Rajya"
Week 12	Day 86	Maithily Jawkar	All ex-contestants to give ticket to finale to active contestants
Week 12	Day 86	Digambar Naik	All ex-contestants to give ticket to finale to active contestants
Week 12	Day 86	Vidyadhar Joshi	All ex-contestants to give ticket to finale to active contestants
Week 12	Day 86	Surekha Punekar	All ex-contestants to give ticket to finale to active contestants
Week 12	Day 86	Vaishali Mhade	All ex-contestants to give ticket to finale to active contestants
Week 12	Day 86	Abhijit Kelkar	All ex-contestants to give ticket to finale to active contestants
Week 12	Day 86	Maadhav Deochake	All ex-contestants to give ticket to finale to active contestants
Week 12	Day 86	Rupali Bhosale	All ex-contestants to give ticket to finale to active contestants
Week 12	Day 86	Heena Panchal	All ex-contestants to give ticket to finale to active contestants
Week 14	Day 91	Jitendra Joshi	For spending time with Contestants
Week 14	Day 91	Gauri Ingawale	To promote film "Panghrun"
Week 14	Day 91	Rohit Phalke	To promote film "Panghrun"
Grand Finale	Day 98	Pushkar Jog	To promote "Sur Nava Dhyas Nava Season 3"

=== Through Video Conferencing ===
Week(s)	Day(s)	Guest(s)	Purpose of visit
Week 10	Day 71	Alka Kubal (As Kishori's friend)	For Friendship Day special
Week 10	Day 71	Rujuta Deshmukh (As Abhijeet's friend)	For Friendship Day special
Week 10	Day 71	Jitendra Joshi (As Neha's friend)	For Friendship Day special
Week 10	Day 71	Ajinkya Nanaware (As Shivani's friend)	For Friendship Day special
Week 10	Day 71	Sushant Shelar (As Rupali's friend)	For Friendship Day special
Week 10	Day 71	Akshaya Gurav (As Veena's friend)	For Friendship Day special
Week 10	Day 71	Aroh's school friend	For Friendship Day special
Week 10	Day 71	Shiv's childhood friend	For Friendship Day special
