= Bigg Boss Marathi season 6 =

Indian Marathi reality show

Bigg Boss Marathi
- Season 6
- Presented by: Riteish Deshmukh
- No. of days: 98
- No. of housemates: 21
- Winner: Tanvi Kolte
- Runner-up: Raqesh Bapat
- No. of episodes: 99

Release
- Original network: Colors Marathi; JioHotstar
- Original release: 11 January – 19 April 2026

Season chronology
- ← Previous; Season 5

Bigg Boss Marathi 6 is the sixth season of Marathi version of reality television show Bigg Boss broadcast in India. The grand premiere was held on 11 January 2026 on Colors Marathi and JioHotstar. Riteish Deshmukh hosted the show for the second time. The grand finale aired on 19 April 2026 where Tanvi Kolte emerged as the winner and Raqesh Bapat finished as the runner-up.

== Production ==
=== Teaser ===
This season was officially announced on 24 November 2025, with the makers unveiling the season's eye logo. A week later, during the broadcast of Bigg Boss 19, the makers announced the return of Riteish Deshmukh as the host of the show.

=== Development ===
The press conference and launch event for this season was held on 5 January 2026, anchored by Jahnavi Killekar.

=== Eye logo ===
The eye logo features the number “6” prominently positioned at the centre of the design. The eye is depicted with a flame-like structure, dominated by shades of red. Subtle blue accents are incorporated into the design, providing visual contrast. The logo is further highlighted by red eyelids-like elements, giving it a fierce and striking appearance.

=== House ===
The house follows a multi-door and window-based theme. The house features approximately 800 windows and 900 doors, making it one of the most visually complex house designs in the history of the Marathi edition. The theme symbolises constant surveillance, openness, and unpredictability, aligning with the core concept of the Bigg Boss format. The house is located in Film City, Mumbai for the fifth time.

== Housemates status ==
Sl.No	Housemates	Day entered	Day Exited	status
1	Tanvi	Day 1	Day 98	Winner
2	Raqesh	Day 1	Day 98	1st Runner-up
3	Vishal	Day 1	Day 98	2nd Runner-up
4	Anushri	Day 1	Day 98	3rd Runner-up
5	Deepali	Day 1	Day 98	4th Runner-up
6	Reva	Day 49	Day 95	Evicted
7	Rakhi	Day 29	Day 91	Evicted
8	Sagar	Day 1	Day 84	Evicted
9	Sanket	Day 49	Day 77	Evicted
10	Prabhu	Day 1	Day 76	Evicted
11	Sanskruti	Day 49	Day 70	Evicted
12	Prajakta	Day 1	Day 63	Evicted
13	Ruchita	Day 1	Day 55	Evicted
14	Roshan	Day 1	Day 48	Evicted
15	Sachin	Day 1	Day 42	Evicted
16	Karan	Day 1	Day 35	Evicted
17	Ayush	Day 1	Day 35	Evicted
18	Omkar	Day 1	Day 28	Evicted
19	Divya	Day 1	Day 27	Ejected
20	Sonali	Day 1	Day 21	Evicted
21	Radha	Day 1	Day 14	Evicted

== Housemates ==
=== Original entrants ===
- Deepali Bhosale Sayyed - Film actress and politician. She gained popularity through Marathi cinema in the late 1990s and early 2000s and has also worked in Hindi films and television.
- Sagar Karande - Marathi comedian. He is known for his multiple roles in Chala Hawa Yeu Dya.
- Sachin Kumavat - Ahirani / kanahdeshi / Marathi singer and performer.
- Sonali Raut - Indian model and actress. She has appeared in Hindi films, music videos, and reality television shows, including Bigg Boss 8.
- Tanvi Kolte - Television actress. She is known for her portrayal of Sinchana in Lakshmi Niwas.
- Ayush Salunke - Television actor. He is known for his lead role in 36 Guni Jodi and Boss Majhi Ladachi.
- Karan Sonawane - Content creator and social media influencer. He is popularly known as Focused Indian.
- Prabhu Shelke - Content creator. He is known for his viral reels.
- Prajakta Shukre - Singer. She was a finalist of Indian Idol season 1.
- Ruchita Jamdar - Reality television alumnus, winner of Dance Maharashtra Dance and She was also a contestant of Roadies season 20.
- Anushri Mane - Content creator and reality television alumni.
- Raqesh Bapat - Film and television actor. He is known for his lead role in Navri Mile Hitlerla. He was also a contestant of Bigg Boss OTT 1 and Bigg Boss 15.
- Roshan Bhajankar - Model and fitness enthusiast.
- Divya Shinde - Social worker.
- Radha Patil - Lavani dancer and stage performer. She known for her performances across Maharashtra.
- Omkar Raut - Fitness enthusiast and hairstylist.
- Vishal Kotian - Television actor. He is known for his performance in Har Mushkil Ka Hal Akbar Birbal. He was also a contestant of Bigg Boss 15.

=== Wild card entrants ===
- Rakhi Sawant - Actress and dancer. She was a contestant on Bigg Boss 1 where she was evicted on Day 84, Bigg Boss 14 where she was a finalist, Bigg Boss 15 where she was evicted in 7th place and Bigg Boss Marathi 4 where she was a finalist.
- Reva Kaurase - Actress. She is known for her role in Deewaniyat and Shiv Shakti.
- Sanskruti Salunke - Reality television alumnus. She was a contestant of Jau Bai Gavat, Dark Scroll and Reality Ranis of the Jungle 2.
- Sanket Pathak - Television actor. He is known for his portrayal of Raghav in Lagnachi Bedi.

== Weekly summary ==
The main events in the Bigg Boss Marathi 6 house are summarised in the table below.

Week 1	Entrances	During the grand premiere on 11 January 2026, host Riteish Deshmukh introduced 17 housemates. Deepali, Sagar, Sachin, Sonali, Tanvi, Ayush, Karan, Prabhu, Prajakta, Ruchita, Anushri, Raqesh, Roshan, Divya, Radha, Omkar and Vishal entered the house in order.
Week 1	Twists	On the grand premiere, host Riteish Deshmukh announced a special entry twist for the housemates, requiring them to choose one of two doors to enter the house. The first door, termed the Shortcut Door, offered exemption from household duties to those who selected it. The second door, known as the Hardship Door, required the housemates who chose it to perform regular household duties and face additional responsibilities within the house.; Contestants / Selection; Deepali / Shortcut door; Sagar / Hardship door; Sachin / Hardship door; Sonali / Shortcut door; Tanvi / Shortcut door; Ayush / Hardship door; Karan / Shortcut door; Prabhu / Hardship door; Prajakta / Shortcut door; Ruchita / Shortcut door; Anushri / Hardship door; Raqesh / Hardship door; Roshan / Hardship door; Divya / Hardship door; Radha / Hardship door; Omkar / Hardship door; Vishal / Hardship door; Power Key Task; During the grand premiere, the contestants who chose the shortcut door were awarded a Power Key by Bigg Boss, resulting in a total of six housemates holding special powers. Bigg Boss then summoned all the Power Key holders to the Power Chamber in pairs: Sonali–Ruchita, Karan–Prajakta, and Deepali–Tanvi. On the very first day, Karan had taken Ruchita's Power Key and later clearly refused to return it. As a result, Ruchita failed the task and was directly nominated for eviction. In the task between Deepali and Tanvi, Tanvi pressed the buzzer first, making her a contender for the captaincy, while Deepali was nominated for eviction. Due to Ruchita's nomination, Sonali also became a direct contender for the captaincy. In the final pairing between Prajakta and Karan, Prajakta emerged as a captaincy contender, while Karan was nominated for eviction.
Week 1	Nominations	Kai Po Che The nomination task involved a kite-cutting activity, in which only the captaincy contenders—Sonali, Prajakta, and Tanvi— were granted the power to participate. During the task, they were allowed to cut kites bearing photographs of the housemates they wished to nominate for eviction. Cutting a contestant's kite directly resulted in that housemate being nominated. Meanwhile, Ruchita, Deepali, and Karan had already been directly nominated for eviction.: Contenders / Nominated to; Sonali / Roshan, Radha; Prajakta / Prabhu, Anushri; Tanvi / Sagar, Divya; As a result, Ruchita, Deepali, Karan, Roshan, Radha, Prabhu, Anushri, Sagar and Divya were nominated.
Week 1	Captaincy task	BB Farm Task Housemates were divided into teams and given farm-related materials, including cotton, to create sheep. Each sheep symbolised a secret confession previously made by one of the contestants. After completing the sheep, the teams were required to identify which contestant each confession belonged to. A correct identification resulted in the elimination of the named contestant from the task, while an incorrect guess led to penalties, including the elimination of the person making the guess. Prajakta competed against Sonali, Tanvi and Anushri in the decisive phase of the task. Tanvi was eliminated first after Anushri correctly identified a confession related to her school life. Anushri was subsequently eliminated when she failed to correctly guess a confession. The final round was contested between Prajakta and Sonali. Prajakta correctly identified that a confession about hiding professional struggles belonged to Anushri, which led to Sonali's elimination. As a result of winning the BB Farm Task, Prajakta was declared the new house captain.
Week 1	House Captain	Prajakta Shukre
Week 1	Exits	There was no elimination in the first week
Week 1
Week 1	Twists	Ulta-Pulta Room; Bigg Boss introduced a special room called ‘Ulta-Pulta Room.’ Designed with all objects placed upside down, the room symbolised unpredictability, with its decisions having the potential to significantly impact the course of the game. The outcome of this room was expected to determine whose game would strengthen and whose journey in the house could come to an end. As the captain at the time, Prajakta was summoned by Bigg Boss to the Ulta-Pulta Room, where she was presented with a crucial choice. Bigg Boss informed her that if she wished to become a contender for the captaincy, she would have to take the Power Key held by Karan. Prajakta accepted the offer, took the Power Key from Karan, and consequently made herself a captaincy contender.: Power Key Task; The Power Key Task was conducted using two symbolic doors—the Dung House and the Wax House. Contestants were divided into trios known as “sparrows,” while the remaining housemates acted as “crows.” In each round, the crows eliminated one sparrow by sending them into the Dung House, after which the eliminated contestant chose one of the remaining two to be eliminated. The final remaining contestant entered the Wax House and received a Power Key. Across all rounds, Vishal, Roshan, Ayush, Prabhu, and Raqesh emerged from their respective groups by entering the Wax House and securing the Power Key, giving them a strategic advantage in the captaincy race.
Week 1	Nominations	The nominations from the previous week were carried forward to the current week, keeping the already nominated contestants in the danger zone without a new nomination process.
Week 1	Main task	Planet Task; The Planets Task was introduced by Bigg Boss as a decisive round to determine the captaincy contenders. Only contestants holding a Power Key were eligible to participate, with two spots available for the captaincy race. In the task, the Power Key holders were assigned the roles of planets in a solar system setup, with a central buzzer referred to as the Sun. Upon Bigg Boss activating the buzzer, one planet had to rush forward and press the Sun buzzer. Following this, two other contestants were designated as eclipses, who consulted with the buzzer-pressing contestant and jointly selected any two planets to place under an eclipse. Contestants placed under an eclipse were immediately eliminated from the captaincy race. By the end of the task, Vishal, Prabhu, Prajakta, and Raqesh were eliminated, while Ayush and Roshan remained and were selected as the final captaincy contenders.
Week 1	Captaincy task	
Week 1	House Captain	Ayush Sanjeev
Week 1	Exits	Radha Patil was evicted after facing public votes

== Nominations table ==
	Week 1	Week 2	Week 3	Week 4	Week 5	Week 6	Week 7	Week 8	Week 9	Week 10	Week 11	Week 12	Week 13	Grand Finale Week 14		
	Week 1	Week 2	Week 3	Week 4	Week 5	Week 6	Week 7	Week 8	Week 9	Week 10	Week 11	Week 12	Week 13	Day 91	Day 98	
Nominees for Captaincy	None	Tanvi; Sonali; Anushri	Ayush; Roshan	None	Sagar; Sachin	Anushri; Roshan	Tanvi; Deepali; Sachin	Prabhu; Anushri; Ruchita	Deepali; Rakhi; Ruchita	Sanket; Prabhu; Reva; Deepali; Tanvi; Prajakta; Rakhi; Raqesh	Deepali; Reva; Vishal; Prabhu	Raqesh; Anushri; Tanvi; Reva; Sagar; Prabhu; Vishal; Deepali; Sanket	Tanvi; Deepali; Reva; Sagar; Anushri	None		
House Captain	None	Prajakta	Ayush	None	Sagar	None	Tanvi	Anushri	Rakhi	Sanket	Vishal	Tanvi	Reva	None		
Captain's Nominations	None	None	Deepali; Sagar; Ruchita	None	Not eligible	None	Prajakta	Sagar; Prajakta	Not eligible	Deepali	Raqesh; Prabhu; Reva	Sagar; Rakhi; Anushri	Not eligible	None		
Vote to:	Evict	none	Evict										none			
Tanvi	Divya; Sagar	Saved	Vishal; Prajakta; Ruchita	Omkar; Ayush; Deepali	Karan	Prajakta; Ruchita	House; Captain	Prajakta; Ruchita	Nominated	Not eligible	Sanket; Sagar	House; Captain	Finalist	Finalist	Winner (Day 98)	
Raqesh	Not eligible	Saved	Vishal	Roshan; Ayush; Sachin	Not eligible	Prajakta; Sachin	Roshan	Prajakta; Ruchita	Deepali	Vishal	Sagar; Sanket	Anushri; ~~Vishal~~	Nominated	Nominated	1st Runner-Up (Day 98)	
Vishal	Not eligible	Saved	Karan; Prajakta; Raqesh	Prabhu; Sachin; Omkar	Sachin	Prabhu; Deepali	Not eligible	Prabhu; Tanvi	Sanket	Sanskruti	House; Captain	Deepali; Reva	Nominated	Nominated	2nd Runner-Up (Day 98)	
Anushri	Not eligible	Nominated	Prajakta	Omkar; Sachin; Ayush	Prajakta	Prajakta; Sachin	Immune	House; Captain	Nominated	Not eligible	Deepali; Reva	Reva; Rakhi	Nominated	Nominated	3rd Runner-Up (Day 98)	
Deepali	Not eligible	Nominated	Karan; Prajakta; Raqesh	Ayush; Karan; Sachin	Not eligible	Ruchita; Sachin	Not eligible	Prajakta; Sagar	Nominated	Sagar	Sanket; Anushri	Rakhi; Sagar	Nominated	Nominated	4th Runner-Up (Day 98)	
Reva	Not in House							Prabhu; Ruchita	Nominated	Nominated	Sagar; Anushri	Sagar; Anushri	House; Captain	Nominated	Evicted (Day 95)	
Rakhi	Not in House				Exempt	Roshan; Sagar	Rakhi	Tanvi; Deepali	House; Captain	Not eligible	Deepali; Reva	~~Raqesh~~; Sagar	Nominated	Evicted (Day 90)		
Sagar	Not eligible	Nominated	Raqesh	Sachin; Ayush; Omkar	House; Captain	Deepali; Raqesh	Not eligible	Deepali; Sanskruti	Prajakta	Raqesh	Reva; Deepali	~~Raqesh~~; Reva	Evicted (Day 84)			
Sanket	Not in House							Prabhu; Ruchita	Nominated	House; Captain	Deepali; Prabhu	Evicted (Day 77)				
Prabhu	Not eligible	Nominated	Omkar; Prajakta; Ruchita	Prajakta; Ayush; Vishal	Not eligible	Sachin; Ruchita	Immune	Prajakta; Ruchita	Tanvi	Reva	Sanket; Sagar	Evicted (Day 76)				
Sanskruti	Not in House							Prajakta; Sagar	Anushri	Prabhu	Evicted (Day 70)					
Prajakta	Prabhu; Anushri	House; Captain	Prabhu; Ruchita	Anushri; Omkar; Prabhu	Not eligible	Anushri; Prabhu	Nominated	Prabhu; Sanskruti	Nominated	Evicted (Day 63)						
Ruchita	Nominated	Nominated	Omkar; Prajakta	Omkar; Sachin; Ayush	Ayush	Prabhu; Deepali	Raqesh	Tanvi; Prabhu	Evicted (Day 55)							
Roshan	Not eligible	Nominated	Raqesh	Tanvi; Raqesh; Divya	Not eligible	Raqesh; Prabhu	Nominated	Evicted (Day 48)								
Sachin	Not eligible	Saved	Ruchita	Divya; Anushri; Raqesh	Prabhu	Anushri; Raqesh	Evicted (Day 42)									
Karan	Nominated	Nominated	Prabhu; Sagar; Raqesh	Anushri; Deepali; Omkar	Not eligible	Evicted (Day 35)										
Ayush	Not eligible	Saved	House; Captain	Omkar; Prabhu; Deepali	Raqesh	Evicted (Day 35)										
Omkar	Not eligible	Saved	Sagar; Ruchita	Prabhu; Sachin; Ayush	Evicted (Day 28)											
Divya	Not eligible	Nominated	Sagar	Sachin; Prabhu; Roshan	Ejected (Day 27)											
Sonali	Radha; Roshan	Saved	Deepali; Sagar	Evicted (Day 21)												
Radha	Not eligible	Nominated	Evicted (Day 14)													
Notes	1, 2	3														
Against Public Vote	Anushri; Deepali; Divya; Karan; Prabhu; Radha; Roshan; Ruchita; Sagar		Deepali; Karan; Omkar; Prabhu; Prajakta; Ruchita; Sonali; Vishal	Anushri; Ayush; Deepali; Divya; Omkar; Prabhu; Raqesh; Roshan; Sachin	Ayush; Karan; Prabhu; Prajakta; Raqesh; Sachin	Anushri; Deepali; Prabhu; Prajakta; Raqesh; Roshan; Ruchita; Sachin; Sagar	Prajakta; Roshan; Rakhi; Raqesh	Deepali; Prajakta; Prabhu; Ruchita; Sagar; Sanskruti; Tanvi	Anushri; Deepali; Prajakta; Reva; Sanket; Tanvi	Deepali; Prabhu; Raqesh; Reva; Sagar; Sanskruti; Vishal	Anushri; Deepali; Prabhu; Raqesh; Reva; Sagar; Sanket	Anushri; Rakhi; Raqesh; Reva; Sagar; Vishal	Anushri; Deepali; Rakhi; Raqesh; Vishal	Anushri; Deepali; Raqesh; Reva; Vishal	Anushri; Deepali; Raqesh; Tanvi; Vishal	
Ejected	None			Divya	None											
Evicted	No; Eviction	Radha	Sonali	Omkar	Ayush	Sachin	Roshan	Ruchita	Prajakta	Sanskruti	Prabhu	Sagar	Rakhi	Reva	Deepali	Anushri
Evicted	No; Eviction	Radha	Sonali	Omkar	Ayush	Sachin	Roshan	Ruchita	Prajakta	Sanskruti	Prabhu	Sagar	Rakhi	Reva	Vishal	Raqesh
Evicted	No; Eviction	Radha	Sonali	Omkar	Karan	Sachin	Roshan	Ruchita	Prajakta	Sanskruti	Sanket	Sagar	Rakhi	Reva	Tanvi	

Color keys

indicates the House Captain.
indicates the nominees for house captaincy.
indicates that the Housemate was safe prior to nominations.
indicates that the Housemate was directly nominated for eviction before the regular nominations process.
indicates the winner.
indicates the first runner-up.
indicates the second runner-up.
indicates the third runner-up.
indicates the fourth runner-up.
indicates that the contestant has re-entered the house.
indicates that the contestant walked out of the show.
indicates that the contestant was ejected from the house.
indicates that the contestant was evicted.

=== Nomination notes ===
- ^1: In pairs, Deepali and Tanvi, Karan and Prajakta, and Ruchita and Sonali - housemates who chose to enter through the Shortcut door were called to the Power Chamber. In each pair, the one who pressed the buzzer first became a captaincy contender, while the other was directly nominated. Tanvi, Prajakta, and Sonali became the captaincy contenders, whereas Deepali, Karan, and Ruchita were directly nominated.
- ^2: In Week 1 nominations, Tanvi, Prajakta, and Sonali were immune and were the only housemates allowed to nominate two housemates each.
- ^3: Due to the No Eviction twist introduced on Day 7, all Week 1 nominees were carried to Week 2. No additional nomination processes took place.

== Guest appearances ==
Week(s)	Day(s)	Guest(s)	Note(s)	Ref.
1	Grand premiere	Just Neel Things, Siddhanth Sarfare, Saurabh Ghadge, Shubham Jadhav	To support their friend Karan Sonawane.
9	63	Bharati Achrekar, Manava Naik, Sanchit Chaudhari, Amruta Phadke, Janhavi Tambat, Amit Rekhi	To promote their TV series Mi Jinkun Ghein Sara
10	70	Sameer Paranjape, Anagha Thakur, Manjiri Bhave, Shweta Mehendale, Shantanu Moghe, Sojal Sawant	To promote their TV series Mohini
11	72	Kishor Kotian	To meet his son Vishal
11	72	Rajshree Kaurase and Dhanashree Kaurase	To meet their sister Reva
11	72	Suparna Shyam	To meet her husband Sanket
11	72	Bobby Khan, Ali Sayed and Usha Bhosle	To meet their wife, mother and daughter Deepali
11	72	Ashok Shelke, Sunita Shelke and Suraj Shelke	To meet their son and brother Prabhu
11	73	Kavita Bapat and Sheetal Bapat	To meet their son and brother Raqesh
11	73	Surekha Mane	To meet her daughter Anushri
11	73	Rakesh Sawant and Usha Sawant	To meet their sister Rakhi
11	73	Usha Kolte	To meet her granddaughter Tanvi
11	73	Sonali Karande and Sai Karande	To meet their husband and father Sagar
14	96	Megha Dhade, Pushkar Jog, Shiv Thakare, Vishal Nikam, Utkarsh Shinde, Akshay Kelkar, Suraj Chavan, Nikki Tamboli, Abhijeet Sawant and Ankita Walawalkar	Ex housemates for freeze release task
Grand Finale	99	Rizwan Sajan	To promote Danube Properties
Grand Finale	99	Genelia Deshmukh, Abhishek Bachchan	To promote their film Raja Shivaji
Grand Finale	99	Janhavi Tambat	To promote her series Mi Jinkun Ghein Sara
Grand Finale	99	Anagha Thakur	To promote her series Mohini
