= Megha Dhade =

Indian actress

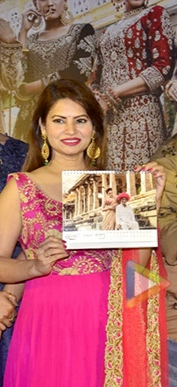
- Dhade in 2019
- Born: 22 May; Jalgaon, Maharashtra, India
- Occupations: Actress, producer
- Years active: 2004 - present
- Political party: Bharatiya Janata Party (2022 - present)
- Spouse: Aditya Pawaskar (m. 2013)
- Children: 2

Megha Dhade is an Indian actress. In 2018, she participated and became the winner of the first season of Bigg Boss Marathi 1 and later participated in Bigg Boss 12 as a wild card contestant.

== Early life ==
She was born on 22 May in a middle-class family in Jalgaon, Maharashtra.

== Career ==
She has appeared in other Hindi TV serials including Kis Dhesh Mai Hai Mera Dil and Kasturi. She made her acting debut with a Marathi movie in 2012. She has also worked in the soap opera Pehchaan, which aired on DD National. In early 2018, she emerged as the winner of the reality show Bigg Boss Marathi In late October 2018, She joined another reality show Bigg Boss 12 as a wild card entry. She was evicted on 6 December.

== Personal life ==
She's married to Aditya Pawaskar. She has two kids, daughter, Sakshi and a step son Vedant from her husband's first marriage.

== Filmography ==
Year	Movie	Language	Role	Comments
2009	Maan Sanman	Marathi		
2011	Superstar	Marathi		
2012	Matter	Marathi		
2016	Ek Hoti Rani	Marathi		

=== Television ===
Year	Show	Language	Role	Notes
2004	Kasautii Zindagii Kay	Hindi		
2008	Pehchaan	Hindi	Sunaina	
2009	Kasturi	Hindi	Sachi	
2014	Jhunj Marathmoli	Marathi	Contestant	
2018	Bigg Boss Marathi 1	Marathi	Herself	Winner Contestant
2018	Assal Pahune Irsal Namune	Marathi	Herself	Guest appearance
2018	Bigg Boss 12	Hindi	Herself	(As wild card Contestant Entered day 36 evicted day 83)
2018	Ekdam Kadak	Marathi	Herself	As a Ex-Winner of Bigg Boss
2019	Bigg Boss Marathi 2	Marathi	Herself	For Special Task
2020	Aaj Kay Special	Marathi	Herself	Along with Shiv Thakare
2021	Bigg Boss Marathi 3	Marathi	Herself	For Special Task
2024–2026	Savlyachi Janu Savali	Marathi	Bhairavi Vaze	
2026	Bigg Boss Marathi 6	Marathi	Herself	For Special Task

== See also ==
- Cinema of India
- Marathi movies
