= Maadhav Deochake =

Indian actor and model

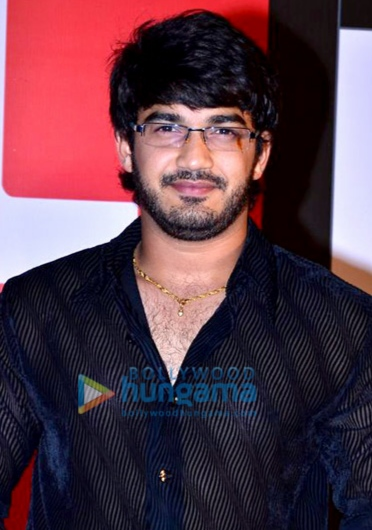
- Born: Mumbai, Maharashtra, India
- Occupations: Actor, Model
- Years active: 2006 –present
- Spouse: Bageshri Joshi (m. 2014)

Maadhav Deochake is an Indian film and television actor, and model. He participated in Bigg Boss Marathi 2.

== Personal life ==
Deochake married Bageshri Joshi in 2014.

== Career ==
He made his television debut with Kata Rute Kunala in 2006. In 2008, He played a role Mohan Nanawati in Hamari Devrani. He also acted in Bind Banunga Ghodi Chadhunga. He made his film debut with Majha Me in 2013 since then he has acted in Gondan, Chintamani, Aga Bai Arechyaa 2 and Citizen, Journey Premachi and FU: Friendship Unlimited.

He has also appeared in the serials Saraswati, Devyani, Tuza Maza Breakup, Dilya Ghari Tu Sukhi Raha.

He also participated in Bigg Boss Marathi 2 and evicted on Day 63. Currently, he is cast in the movie Vijeta.

== Filmography ==
Television
Year	Title	Role	Language
2006-2008	Kata Rute Kunala	Rohan Karnik	Marathi
2008-2011	Hamari Devrani	Mohan Nanawati	Hindi
2008	Ha Khel Sawalyancha	Shripad	Marathi
2008	Ghe Bharari	Dhananjay	Marathi
2011	Khel Mandala	Rushi	Marathi
2011	Dilya Ghari Tu Sukhi Raha		Marathi
2012	Bind Banuga Ghodi Chadhunga	Aadesh Podar	Hindi
2012	Savdhaan India	Dr Shiv (Episode 259)	Hindi
2012	Devyani	Dr. Namit	Marathi
2013	Tuza Maza Jamena	Krish	Marathi
2015	Saraswati	Kanha	Marathi
2016	Goth	Vikram Jahagirdar	Marathi
2017	Moh Moh Ke Dhaage	Anshul	Hindi
2017	Tuza Maza Breakup	Rajnish Pradhan	Marathi
2019	Bigg Boss Marathi 2	Contestant	Marathi
2021	Bigg Boss Marathi 3	Guest appearance	Marathi
2021	Aboli	Shreyas Marathe	Marathi

Films
Year	Title	Notes
2013	Ishwari	
2013	Majha Me	
2013	Ekulti Ek	
2014	Chintamani	
2014	Gondan	
2015	Aga Bai Arechyaa 2	
2015	Ek Tara	
2017	FU: Friendship Unlimited	
2017	Journey Premachi	
2020	Prawaas	
2020	Vijeta	
