= Bigg Boss Marathi season 1 =

Indian Marathi reality show

Bigg Boss Marathi
- Season 1
- Presented by: Mahesh Manjrekar
- No. of days: 98
- No. of housemates: 18
- Winner: Megha Dhade
- Runner-up: Pushkar Jog
- No. of episodes: 99

Release
- Original network: Colors Marathi; Voot Select
- Original release: 15 April – 22 July 2018

Season chronology
- Next → Season 2

Bigg Boss Marathi 1 is the first season of the Marathi version of the reality television show Bigg Boss broadcast in India. The grand premiere was held on 15 April 2018 on Colors Marathi and Mahesh Manjrekar hosted this season of the show. For this season of Bigg Boss, a lavish house set has been constructed in Lonavala. The Grand Finale aired on 22 July 2018 and Megha Dhade was declared as the winner and Pushkar Jog as the Runner-up.

== Housemates status ==
Sr no.	Housemate	Day entered	Day exited	Status
1	Megha	Day 1	Day 98	Winner
2	Pushkar	Day 1	Day 98	1st runner-up
3	Smita	Day 1	Day 98	2nd runner-up
4	Sai	Day 1	Day 98	3rd runner-up
5	Aastad	Day 1	Day 98	4th runner-up
6	Sharmishtha	Day 39	Day 98	5th runner-up
7	Resham	Day 1	Day 91	Evicted
8	Nandkishor	Day 47	Day 84	Evicted
9	Usha	Day 1	Day 77	Evicted
10	Bhushan	Day 1	Day 63	Evicted
11	Tyagraj	Day 40	Day 56	Evicted
12	Sushant	Day 1	Day 52	Walked
13	Jui	Day 1	Day 49	Evicted
14	Harshada	Day 32	Day 38	Guest
15	Rutuja	Day 1	Day 35	Walked
16	Rajesh	Day 1	Day 35	Evicted
17	Anil	Day 1	Day 28	Evicted
18	Vineet	Day 1	Day 14	Evicted
19	Aarti	Day 1	Day 7	Evicted

== Housemates ==
=== Original entrants ===
The housemates in the alphabetical order:

- Aarti Solanki - Comedian who participating the comedy reality show Fu Bai Fu and the dancing reality show Eka Peksha Ek.
- Aastad Kale - Television actor who has appeared in television show Pudhcha Paaul.
- Anil Thatte - Journalist.
- Bhushan Kadu - Comedian and actor who appeared in the Marathi show Comedy Express.
- Jui Gadkari - Television actress who was in the television show Pudhcha Paaul.
- Megha Dhade - Film actress who has appeared in several Marathi films, including Superstar. She also participated in the Marathi reality show Jhunj Marathmoli.
- Pushkar Jog - Film actor and producer who participated in Marathi Dancing reality shows.
- Rajesh Shringarpure - Film and television actor. who acted in many Marathi films, including Zenda, Swarajya and Television serials.
- Resham Tipnis - Film and television actress who has appeared in many Marathi and Bollywood Films. She also did a small role in Bollywood Movie Baazigar.
- Rutuja Dharmadhikari - Television actress who rose to fame after her performance in a Marathi horror show Ratris Khel Chale.
- Sai Lokur - Film actress and model. She is known for her role in Bollywood film Kis Kisko Pyaar Karoon alongside Kapil Sharma.
- Smita Gondkar - Film actress, model and stunt rider who rose to fame after her appearance in Marathi music video Pappi De Paarula.
- Sushant Shelar - Film actor who did many Marathi plays and films.
- Usha Nadkarni - Film and television actress who has appeared in Marathi and Bollywood films. She is known for her Performance in Hindi daily soap Pavitra Rishta.
- Vineet Bhonde - Television actor who appeared in Marathi comedy show Chala Hawa Yeu Dya.

=== Wild-Card entrants ===
- Sharmishtha Raut - Television actress. She mainly acted in Marathi television serials.
- Tyagraj Khadilkar - an actor and singer
- Nandkishor Chaughule - an actor and comedian.

=== Guest entrant ===
- Harshada Khanvilkar - Television actress. She is known for her performance in Pudhcha Paaul as Akkasaheb. She was guest for 1 week.

== Guest appearances ==
Week(s)	Day(s)	Guest(s)	Purpose of Visit
Week 1	Day 0	Vineet's wife	To support Vineet
Week 1	Day 0	Usha's brother	To support Usha
Week 1	Day 7	Sharad Upadhye	For Future Prediction of Contestants
Week 3	Day 15	Smita Thatte (Anil's wife)	For Motivating Anil Thatte
Week 3	Day 16	Prasenjit Kosambi	For Maharashtra Day Special
Week 3	Day 16	Priyadarshan Jadhav	For Maharashtra Day Special
Week 3	Day 16	Aarti Solanki	For Maharashtra Day Special
Week 3	Day 16	Vineet Bhonde	For Maharashtra Day Special
Week 3	Day 21	Swwapnil Joshi	To promote film "Ranangan"
Week 3	Day 21	Sachin Pilgaonkar	To promote film "Ranangan"
Week 4	Day 28-29	Hrishikesh Joshi	To promote film "Cycle"
Week 4	Day 28-29	Dipti Lele	To promote film "Cycle"
Week 4	Day 32-38	Harshada Khanvilkar	As Guest Contestant
Week 9	Day 58	Abhijeet Nadkarni (Usha's son)	To surprise contestants in the statue task
Week 9	Day 58	Smita's mother	To surprise contestants in the statue task
Week 9	Day 58	Rishika Seth (Resham's daughter)	To surprise contestants in the statue task
Week 9	Day 58	Supriya Patankar (Sharmishtha's sister)	To surprise contestants in the statue task
Week 9	Day 58	Veena Lokur (Sai's mother)	To surprise contestants in the statue task
Week 9	Day 59	Pramod Kale (Aastad's father)	To surprise contestants in the statue task
Week 9	Day 59	Kadambari Kadu (Bhushan's wife)	To surprise contestants in the statue task
Week 9	Day 59	Prakrita Kadu (Bhushan's son)	To surprise contestants in the statue task
Week 9	Day 59	Megha's mother	To surprise contestants in the statue task
Week 9	Day 59	Sakshi Pawaskar (Megha's daughter)	To surprise contestants in the statue task
Week 9	Day 59	Jasmine Jog (Pushkar's wife)	To surprise contestants in the statue task
Week 9	Day 59	Felisha Jog (Pushkar's daughter)	To surprise contestants in the statue task
Week 9	Day 59	Nandkishor's wife	To surprise contestants in the statue task
Week 9	Day 63	Aarti Solanki	For motivating contestants
Week 9	Day 63	Rajesh Shringarpure	For motivating contestants
Week 9	Day 63	Anil Thatte	For motivating contestants
Week 12	Day 80-81	Sukanya Kulkarni	To perform Saasu-Suun Task
Week 12	Day 80-81	Atisha Naik	To perform Saasu-Suun Task
Week 12	Day 80-81	Bhagyashree Limaye	To perform Saasu-Suun Task
Week 13	Day 87-88	Sachit Patil	To perform BB Hotel Task
Week 13	Day 87-88	Veena Jagtap	To perform BB Hotel Task
Week 13	Day 87-88	Omprakash Shinde	To perform BB Hotel Task
Week 13	Day 87-88	Surabhi Hande	To perform BB Hotel Task
Week 13	Day 90	Mahesh Manjrekar	To spend time with contestants
Week 13	Day 90	Medha Manjrekar	To spend time with contestants
Grand Finale	Day 99	Mahesh Kale	To Promote show "Sur Nava Dhyas Nava"
Grand Finale	Day 99	Sai Tamhankar	Special appearance

=== Special episode (4 hours) ===
- 15 April 2018
- 22 July 2018

== Nominations table ==
	Week 1	Week 2	Week 3	Week 4	Week 5	Week 6	Week 7	Week 8	Week 9	Week 10	Week 11	Week 12	Week 13	Week 14				
	Week 1	Week 2	Week 3	Week 4	Week 5	Week 6	Week 7	Week 8	Week 9	Week 10	Week 11	Week 12	Week 13	Day 92	Day 98			
Nominees for Captaincy	Anil; Sai; Smita; Vineet	Aastad; Smita	Megha; Resham; Sai	Jui; Pushkar	~~Jui~~; Pushkar; ~~Rutuja~~; Smita	Pushkar; Sushant	Megha; Sushant	Aastad; ~~Resham~~; Sushant	Sai; Tyagraj	Aastad; Megha; Pushkar	Nandkishor; Resham; Sai	Aastad; Pushkar	Aastad; ~~Megha~~; ~~Nandkishor~~; ~~Pushkar~~; ~~Resham~~; Sai; ~~Sharmishtha~~; ~~Smita~~	Aastad; Megha; Pushkar; Resham; Sai; Sharmishtha; Smita	No; Captain			
House Captain	Vineet	Aastad	Megha	~~Jui~~; Bhushan	Smita	No; Captain	Megha	Sushant	Sai	Pushkar	Resham	Pushkar	Sai	Usha	No; Captain			
Captain's Nominations	Pushkar (to save)	Pushkar; Anil	Not eligible	Resham (to save)	Not eligible	No; Captain	Not eligible		Smita	Sai (to save); Resham (to evict)	Not eligible	Smita; Nandkishor	Not eligible	Not eligible	No; Captain			
Vote to:	Evict				Evict / Save	Evict	Evict / Save	Safe Zone	Evict		none	Evict	Prize Money	None	WIN			
Megha	Rutuja; Aastad	Smita; Resham	House; Captain	Sushant	Jui (to evict)	House; Decision	House; Captain	Out	Nandkishor; Bhushan	Aastad	Not eligible	Nandkishor; Smita	Gave ₹ 4,40,000	Nominated	Winner (Day 98)			
Pushkar	Rutuja; Jui	Resham; Sushant	Rajesh	Smita	Usha (to save)	House; Decision	Resham (to evict)	In	Smita; Bhushan	House; Captain	Not eligible	House; Captain	Gave ₹ 4,50,000	House; Captain	1st runner-up (Day 98)			
Smita	Usha; Aarti	Pushkar; Jui	Not eligible	Aastad	House; Captain	House; Decision	Sushant (to evict)	In	Pushkar; Sharmishtha	Not eligible	Not eligible	Sai; Megha	Kept ₹ 4,10,000	Nominated	2nd runner-up (Day 98)			
Sai	Usha; Rajesh	Resham; Smita	Not eligible	Resham	Rajesh (to evict)	House; Decision	Aastad (to evict)	In	House; Captain	Nandkishor; Smita	Not eligible	Nandkishor; Smita	House; Captain	Nominated	3rd runner-up (Day 98)			
Aastad	Usha; Rutuja	House; Captain	Sushant	Rutuja	Sushant (to evict)	House; Decision	Pushkar (to evict)	Out	Sharmishtha; Usha	Megha	Not eligible	Megha; Sai	Kept ₹ 4,30,000	Safe	4th runner-up (Day 98)			
Sharmishtha	Not In House						Exempt	In	Bhushan; Resham	Not eligible	Not eligible	Smita; Resham	Gave ₹ 3,50,000	Nominated	5th runner-up (Day 98)			
Resham	Rutuja; Usha	Anil; Vineet	Resham	Megha	Sai (to evict)	House; Decision	Sai (to evict)	Out	Sharmishtha; Megha	Sai; Sharmishtha	House; Captain	Megha; Sai	Kept ₹ 4,20,000	Aastad (to save)	Evicted (Day 91)			
Nandkishor	Not In House							Exempt	Pushkar; Megha	Not eligible	Not eligible	Megha; Sai	Evicted (Day 84)					
Usha	Smita; Pushkar	Anil; Resham	Resham	Bhushan	Megha (to save)	House; Decision	Jui (to evict)	Out	Aastad; Smita	Not eligible	Not eligible	Evicted (Day 77)						
Bhushan	Rutuja; Pushkar	Pushkar; Anil	Pushkar	House; Captain	Not eligible	House; Decision	Usha (to save)	Out	Sharmishtha; Nandkishor	Evicted (Day 63)								
Tyagraj	Not In House						Exempt	Out	Evicted (Day 56)									
Sushant	Rutuja; Megha	Anil; Pushkar	Sushant	Anil	Pushkar (to evict)	House; Decision	Smita (to save)	House; Captain	Walked (Day 52)									
Jui	Rutuja; Bhushan	Anil; Vineet	Jui	Not eligible	Rutuja (to evict)	House; Decision	Bhushan (to save)	Evicted (Day 49)										
Rutuja	Resham; Bhushan	Resham; Jui	Jui	Not eligible	Resham (to evict)	Walked (Day 35)												
Rajesh	Rutuja; Usha	Anil; Pushkar	Rajesh	In Secret; Room	Aastad (to save)	Evicted (Day 35)												
Anil	Usha; Aarti	Vineet; Smita	Bhushan	Usha	Bhushan (to save)	Evicted (Day 28)												
Vineet	House; Captain	Anil; Resham	Anil (to evict)	Evicted (Day 14)														
Aarti	Smita; Rutuja	Usha (to save)	Evicted (Day 7)															
Notes	1	2	3	none	4	5,6,7	4	4,8	9	4,10	4	11	4	12				
Against Public Vote	Aarti; Anil; Bhushan; Rutuja; Smita; Usha	Anil; Jui; Pushkar; Resham; Smita; Vineet	Bhushan; Jui; Rajesh; Resham; Sushant	Aastad; Anil; Jui; Rutuja; Sushant; Usha	Jui; Pushkar; Rajesh; Resham; Rutuja; Sai; Sushant	Aastad; Megha; Sai; Sushant; Usha	Aastad; Jui; Pushkar; Resham; Sai; Sushant	Aastad; Bhushan; Megha; Resham; Tyagraj; Usha	Bhushan; Sharmishtha; Smita	Aastad; Megha; Nandkishor; Resham; Sharmishtha; Smita	Aastad; Sai; Sharmishtha; Smita; Usha	Nandkishor; Megha; Sai; Sharmishtha; Smita	Aastad; Resham; Smita	Megha; Sai; Sharmishtha; Smita	Aastad; Megha; Pushkar; Sai; Sharmishtha; Smita			
Secret Room	None		Rajesh	None														
Walked	None					Rutuja	None	Sushant	None									
Evicted	Aarti	Vineet	No; Eviction	Anil	Rajesh	No; Eviction	Jui	Tyagraj	Bhushan	No; Eviction	Usha	Nandkishor	Resham	No; Eviction	Sharmishtha	Aastad	Sai	
Evicted	Aarti	Vineet	No; Eviction	Anil	Rajesh	No; Eviction	Jui	Tyagraj	Bhushan	No; Eviction	Usha	Nandkishor	Resham	No; Eviction	Smita	Pushkar		Usha

=== Notes ===
indicates the House Captain.
indicates that the Housemate was directly nominated for eviction prior to the regular nominations process.
indicates that the Housemate was granted immunity from nominations.
indicates that the Housemate was in the Secret Room.

- ^Note 1: On Day 1, housemates had to choose 4 housemates for being the House Captain. In the task, Vineet won the House Captain title, Sai won Immunity & Anil was directly nominated.
- ^Note 2: On Day 7, Aarti had a power to give immunity to one housemate for the next week. She chose Usha to be immune.
- ^Note 3: On Day 22, Rajesh was fake evicted and moved to the secret room.
- ^Note 4: Nomination was a part of a task.
- ^Note 5: Housemates had to mutually decide to nominate 5 housemates for eviction.
- ^Note 6: Harshada stayed for a week as a Guest.
- ^Note 7: Voting lines were closed for the week, as Rutuja walked due to illness.
- ^Note 8: On Day 52, Sushant walked from the house due to illness.
- ^Note 9: This week, House Captain had a special power to directly nominate one housemate for eviction. Sai chose to nominate Smita.
- ^Note 10: This week the voting lines are closed.
- ^Note 11: Prior to the nomination. Both wild-cards Nandkishor & Sharmishtha were given a secret task. If they succeeded, they will be immune from nomination, but both of them failed and they were directly nominated for eviction.
- ^Note 12: For this week, Public voted to win and not to save.
