= Dilya Ghari Tu Sukhi Raha =

Marathi television series

- Genre: Family drama
- Directed by: Girish Vasaikar
- Starring: See below
- Theme music composer: Kaushal Inamdar
- Country of origin: India
- Original language: Marathi
- No. of episodes: 336

Production
- Producers: Rakesh Sarang; Sangeet Sarang
- Camera setup: Multi-camera
- Running time: 22 minutes
- Production company: Camps Club

Original release
- Network: Zee Marathi
- Release: 28 November 2011 – 22 December 2012

Dilya Ghari Tu Sukhi Raha (transl. Live Happily in the home given to you) is an Indian Marathi language which aired on Zee Marathi. It premiered from 28 November 2011 and ended on 22 December 2012. It starred Saurabh Gogate and Bhakti Deshpande in lead roles.

== Plot ==
The show is about the changes that come in a girl's life and how her marital home differs from her paternal home and the overriding question in every girl and every mother's heart that will her daughter get the same love and care in her marital home. The story revolves around Vrunda a bright, ambitious, righteous girl who is aspires to be an engineer. She is the topper at her college and her parents have many hopes for her. Her family comprises her father Baburao a simple service man, her mother Mangala who is a homemaker, elder sister Chandana and a younger brother. Vrunda's life takes an unforeseen turn when due to tragic circumstances that render her family helpless she is married to Prasad Chorge from the same chawl. Her entry into matrimony squashes her dreams of a bright education and promising career. She has to face the strongest challenge in her life, that of a very manipulative, conniving mother-in-law Kanta Chorge whose sole aim is to teach Vrunda a lesson as she is the only one who has threatened her stronghold in the chawl. Will Vrunda find love & support in Prasad who would soon spot the burning desire in her to excel, or will matrimony and the daily grind of managing expectations take a toll on her.

Vrunda an aspiring student with free-minded gets on the wrong foot with Kanta Chorge an evil resident Limbuwadi. Vrunda's elder sister Chandana's marriage gets fixed with Kanta's son Prasad. But while traveling, she meets with an accident and loses one of her leg and hence Kanta tries to break the alliance. Vrunda's parents get shocked with this news and asks her to agree for the alliance. Kanta to defeat Vrunda's self-esteem, she asks her parents to get Vrunda married to Prasad and they agree. After the marriage, Kanta misunderstands Vrunda's every attempt and creates hurdles for her and tries to torture her.

== Cast ==
=== Main ===
- Saurabh Gogate as Prasad Chorghe
- Bhakti Deshpande as Vrunda Kakade

=== Recurring ===
- Atisha Naik as Kanta Chorghe
- Mrunal Chemburkar as Vrunda and Chanda's mother
- Rajan Bhise as Baburao Kakade, Vrunda and Chanda's father
- Yogesh Soman
- Rupali Bhosale
- Pratiksha Jadhav

== Reception ==
=== Grand Premiere ===
A grand premiere of this new Marathi serial was held in the presence of huge audience at Sahakar Nagar, Wadala. The inaugural episode was witnessed by the audience gathered on this occasion in the presence of all the artistes from this serial besides other celebrities who were present there. Abhijeet Khandkekar played the host of the programme.

=== Airing history ===
No.	Airing Date	Days	Time (IST)
1	28 November 2011 – 14 April 2012	Mon-Sat	7 pm
2	16 April – 22 December 2012	Mon-Sat	7.30 pm
