= Neha Shitole =

Indian actress

- Born: Pune, Maharashtra, India
- Occupation: Actress
- Years active: 2009–present
- Known for: Sacred Games; Bigg Boss Marathi 2
- Spouse: Nachiket Purnapatre (m. 2011)

Neha Shitole is an Indian actress who works predominantly in Marathi and Hindi television and films. She is known for her participation in Bigg Boss Marathi 2 as a contestant in which she was the first runner up.

== Career ==
She made her acting debut with film Deool in 2011. Since then, she acted in various Marathi films such as Popat, Sur Sapata, Disha, Readymix, Poshter Girl. She has also acted in many television series such as Tu Tithe Me, Kunku, Fu Bai Fu, Ka Re Durava. She appeared in Sacred Games - Netflix as Shalini Katekar. In 2019, she participated in Bigg Boss Marathi 2 and become runner up. She also featured in Marathi play Bye Bye Bayko in 2018.

== Filmography ==
Television
Year	Title	Role	Ref.
2009-2012	Kunku	Negative Role	
2012-2014	Tu Tithe Me	Netra	
2012-2014	Fu Bai Fu	Contestant	
2014	Jhunj Marathmoli	Contestant	
2014-2016	Ka Re Durava	Naina	
2018-2019	Sacred Games - Netflix	Shalini Katekar	
2019	Bigg Boss Marathi 2	1st runner Up	
2019	Don Special	Guest	
2020	Aaj Kay Special	Special appearance	
2021	Bigg Boss Marathi 3	For special task	
2022	Bigg Boss Marathi 4	For special task	

Films
Year	Title	Role	Notes	Ref.
2009	Kaminey	Sweety's friend		
2011	Deool	Tommy's wife		
2013	Popat			
2016	Poshter Girl	Mangala Thorat		
2016	Disha	Aditi		
2019	Sur Sapata			
2019	Readymix			
2021	Well Done Baby	Doctor		
2022	Ek Villain Returns	Chetna		
2024	Navardev Bsc. Agri	Raja's sister-in-law		
2025	Devmanus	-	As writer	
