= Rupali Bhosale =

Indian television actress

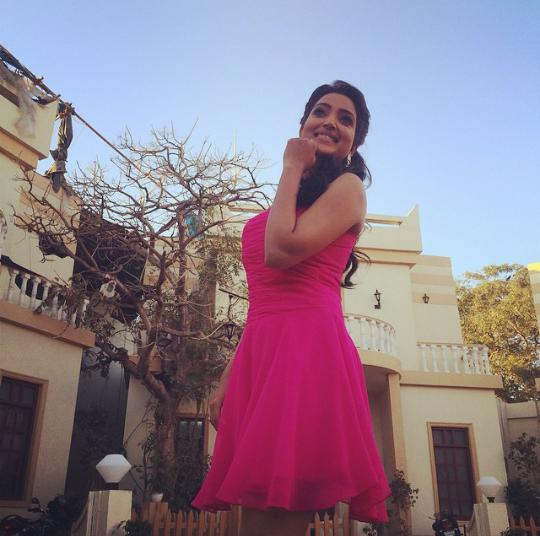
- Bhosale at sunshine colony
- Born: Mumbai, Maharashtra, India
- Occupation: Actress
- Years active: 2007–present

Rupali Bhosale is an Indian television actress known for playing Sanjana in Star Pravah's show Aai Kuthe Kay Karte! and Varsha Ghotala in Sony SAB's Badi Doooor Se Aaye Hai. She was a contestant in the reality show Bigg Boss Marathi 2 in 2019.

== Career ==
Bhosale started her career with Marathi shows like Man Udhan Varyache, Don Kinaare Doghi Apan and Kanyadaan. She later made her Bollywood debut with the film Risk in 2007.

== Filmography ==
=== Television ===
Year	Name	Language	Channel	Notes
2006	Mahasangram	Hindi	DD National	Debut Series
2007	Hya Gojirvanya Gharat	Marathi	ETV Marathi	
2008	Vahinisaheb	Marathi	Zee Marathi	
2008	Tea Time	Marathi	DD Sahyadri	
2009	Ayushmaan Bhava	Hindi	DD National	
2009	Tujhe Majhe Jamena	Marathi	DD Sahyadri	
2009	Kulvadhu	Marathi	Zee Marathi	
2009-2011	Man Udhan Varyache	Marathi	Star Pravah	
2010	Gane Tumche Aamche	Marathi	ETV Marathi	
2011-2012	Dilya Ghari Tu Sukhi Raha	Marathi	Zee Marathi	
2012	Don Kinare Doghi Aapan	Marathi	Star Pravah	
2012	Eka Peksha Ek - Apsara Aali	Marathi	Zee Marathi	Contestant
2013	Kanyadan	Marathi	Mi Marathi	
2013	Shejari Shejari Pakke Shejari	Marathi	Zee Marathi	
2014-2016	Badi Doooor Se Aaye Hai	Hindi	Sony SAB	
2015	Kasme Vaade	Hindi	DD National	
2016	Kulswamini	Marathi	Star Pravah	
2018	Tenali Rama	Hindi	Sony SAB	
2019	Bigg Boss Marathi 2	Marathi	Colors Marathi	Contestant (Evicted on Day 70)
2021–2024	Aai Kuthe Kay Karte!	Marathi	Star Pravah	
2022	Aata Hou De Dhingana	Marathi	Star Pravah	Contestant
2025–present	Lapandaav	Tejaswini Kamat / Manaswini (Sarkar)	Star Pravah	

== Web series ==
Year	Title	Role	Notes	Ref.
2018	Zero KMs	Minal	ZEE5	

== See also ==
- List of Indian television actresses
