= Vishal Kotian =

Indian actor (born 1985)

- Born: 13 February 1985 (age 41); Mumbai, Maharashtra, India
- Occupation: Actor
- Years active: 1997—present
- Known for: Har Mushkil Ka Hal Akbar Birbal; Akbar Ka Bal Birbal

Vishal Kotian is an Indian film and television actor. He is known for playing the role of Birbal in Har Mushkil Ka Hal Akbar Birbal and Akbar Ka Bal Birbal. In 2021, he participated in Bigg Boss 15 and in 2026 is a part of Bigg Boss Marathi Season 6.

== Filmography ==
=== Television ===
Year	Serial	Role
1997	Zindagi Milke Bitayenge	
1998	Dil Vil Pyar Vyar	Vishal
1999	Family No.1	Mohit
2001	Ssshhhh...Koi Hai	Piyush
2005	Phir Bhi Dil Hai Hindustani	Various Characters
2006-2008	Aek Chabhi Hai Padoss Mein	Rahul Gupta
2006	Aisa Des Hai Mera	Lucky
2007	Darling I Love U Two	Vishal
2009	CID	Sunny
2009	Oh Darling Yeh Hai India	Vicky
2009–2010	Shree Adi Manav	Shree
2011	Pyaar Mein Twist	
2013	Devon Ke Dev...Mahadev	Hanuman
2014	Mahabharat	Hanuman
2014–2017	Har Mushkil Ka Hal Akbar Birbal	Birbal
2015	SuperCops Vs SuperVillains	Rohan (Magnetic Man) / Emotional Tinku / Atrangi
2019	Vighnaharta Ganesh	Ravan
2020	Akbar Ka Bal Birbal	Birbal
2021	Bigg Boss 15	Contestant
2023	Maitree	Bajrangi
2026	Bigg Boss Marathi season 6	Contestant 3rd Place

=== Films ===
Year	Film	Role
2001	The Deadly Disciple	Suria
2008	Don Muthu Swami	Veeru
