= Har Mushkil Ka Hal Akbar Birbal =

Indian television series

- Genre: Historical comedy
- Created by: Moti Sagar
- Written by: Deepak malik, Rakesh Baranwal, Timir Bakshi, Paritosh Painter
- Directed by: Amit Damle
- Starring: Kiku Sharda; Vishal Kotian; Delnaaz Irani; Kishwer Merchant; Sunil Chauhan; Thakur Anoop Singh
- Country of origin: India
- Original language: Hindi
- No. of seasons: 5
- No. of episodes: 579

Production
- Producer: Nikhil Sinha
- Cinematography: Nitinchandra Bandekar
- Production companies: Reliance Broadcast Network; Triangle Film Company

Original release
- Network: BIG Magic
- Release: 28 April 2014

Related
- Birbal Aur Viraat

Har Mushkil Ka Hal Akbar Birbal is an Indian historical comedy television series which aired on BIG Magic. It stars Kiku Sharda and Vishal Kotian. A Bhojpuri language dubbed version aired on Big Ganga.

== Plot ==
The show's story is based on the well known folklore characters, Akbar and Birbal have been extremely popular with the kids for their combined wit and wisdom. The show is a fresh, comic take on the relation between Emperor Akbar and his seventh jewel Birbal that not only makes one laugh but also teaches valuable lessons. The first in the genre of Historical Comedy, Akbar Birbal has captured the audience's imagination with its delightful storyline and stellar cast.

== Cast ==
=== Main ===
- Kiku Sharda as King Akbar
- Vishal Kotian as Birbal
- Kishwer Merchant as Urvashi
- Delnaaz Irani as Queen Jodha Bai (2014–2016)
- Pragati Mehra as Rani Sahiba / Jodha Bai (2016)
- Thakur Anoop Singh as Sharafat Khan / Mullah Do Piyaza
- Sunil Chauhan as Wazeer-e-Azam Rana Baldev
- Pawan Singh as Prince Salim
- Sumit Arora as Vasudev
- Farzill Pardiawalla / Abhishek Oberoi as Tansen
- Rimpi Das as Anarkali
- Yashkant Sharma as Raja Darban aka. Rajjah

=== Recurring ===
- Kunickaa Sadanand as Rani Durgavati
- Shehzad Khan / Mohit Abrol / Gaurav Sharma as Turram Khan
- Sara Khan as Shaila Bano
- Rohit Khurana as Viraat
- Ram Awana as Hakim / Raja Aloknath and Moonga

=== Guests ===
- Chetan Hansraj as Rehmat Khan
- Shalini Sahuta as Sukanya
- Pankaj Dheer as King Abraham Quli Qutub Shah Wali
- Sudha Chandran as Bhavani / Teej Mata
- Smita Bansal as Umrao Jaan
- Roshni Chopra as Koyal
- Lavina Tandon as Haseena
- Aishwarya Sakhuja as Jiya
- Chaitanya Choudhry as Zeb Khan
- Sargun Mehta as Yakshini
- Monica Castelino as Rupali / Roop
- Mohena Singh as Rajkumari Roopali
- Adhvik Mahajan as Pishach Sohan
- Ankit Gera as Raja Ranjit Singh
- Roop Durgapal as Icchadhari Nagin and Rekha Madhuri aka Female Birbal
- Madhura Naik as Qayamat Bano
- Raquib Arshad as Cheddhi
- Bhupindder Bhoopii as Changez Khan
- Umesh Bajpai as Kaali
- Ehsaan Qureshi as Shayar Amir Khan
- Samiksha Bhatt as Shantipriya
- Ruma Sharma as Saloni
- Adi Irani as Bairam Khan
- Rajveer Singh Rajput as Thief
- Poorti Arya as Deewani-Mastani
- Sapan Gulati as Prince Veer
- Amrita Prakash as Princess Aishwarya
- Ketan Karande as Rajkumar Surajbhan
- Rajesh Khera as Raja Ali Raza / Mirza Muhammad Hakim
- Krish Parekh as Kabir

== Episodes and stories ==
Season	Stories with 1 episode	Stories with 2 episodes	Stories with 3 episodes	Total episodes
1	91	50	1	194
2				158
3				121
4				78
5				28
Total				579

=== Season 1 ===
Season 1 has 194 episodes, of which all episodes were released with specific story names presented below except for episode 2, 104 to 110.

- Episode 1 : Bhrashtachar
- Episode 2 : NA ( PT -- Jiska kaam usi ko saje )
- Episode 3 : Jaago janta jaago
- Episode 4 : Joru ka gulam
- Episode 5 : Bevkhoofon ka raja
- Episode 6 : Mahal ki chudail
- Episode 7 : Ded hath ki rassi
- Episode 8 : Aankhon dekhi kano suni
- Episode 9 : Chor ki daadi mein tinka
- Episode 10 : Saajish
- Episode 11 : Vishv vijeta: Bhag 1
- Episode 12 : Vishv vijeta: Bhag 2
- Episode 13 : Deshdrohi Birbal
- Episode 14 : Ek teer do shiksar
- Episode 15 : Ghamandi Jadoogar
- Episode 16 : Birbal milap: Bhag 1
- Episode 17 : Birbal milap: Bhag 2
- Episode 18 : Birbal bana bachcha
- Episode 19 : Shaahi golmal: Bhag 1
- Episode 20 : Shaahi golmal: Bhag 2
- Episode 21 : Main tumse pyar karta hoon
- Episode 22 : Menka nrityaki: Bhag 1
- Episode 23 : Menka nrityaki: Bhag 2
- Episode 24 : Mujrim Birbal:Bhag 1
- Episode 25 : Mujrim Birbal:Bhag 2
- Episode 26 : Chin ki rajkumari:Bhag 1
- Episode 27 : Chin ki rajkumari:Bhag 2
- Episode 28 : Birbal chale Bhopal: Bhag 1
- Episode 29 : Birbal chale Bhopal: Bhag 2
- Episode 30 : Sone ke aam
- Episode 31 : Mujhse shaadi karoge?: Bhag 1
- Episode 32 : Mujhse shaadi karoge?: Bhag 2
- Episode 33 : Birbal chhod chale Akbar ko: Bhag 1
- Episode 34 : Birbal chhod chale Akbar ko: Bhag 2
- Episode 35 : Deshdrohi ko inam
- Episode 36 : Sabse pyari cheeez
- Episode 37 : Dharm sankat: Bhag 1
- Episode 38 : Dharm sankat: Bhag 2
- Episode 39 : Haso hasao garmi bhagao: Bhag 1
- Episode 40 : Haso hasao garmi bhagao: Bhag 2
- Episode 41 : Baarish
- Episode 42 : Manhoosh shakal
- Episode 43 : Nakal me bhi akal ki zaroorat hoti hai
- Episode 44 : Kaun hoon main?: Bhag 1
- Episode 45 : Kaun hoon main?: Bhag 2
- Episode 46 : Akbar ki adalat
- Episode 47 : Chitr ki rahasy: Bhag 1
- Episode 48 : Chitr ki rahasy: Bhag 2
- Episode 49 : Saleem ka nikah: Bhag 1
- Episode 50 : Saleem ka nikah: Bhag 2
- Episode 51 : Sabse badi cheez
- Episode 52 : Kiska bachcha?
- Episode 53 : Akbar ka vaham
- Episode 54 : Prem raag: Bhag 1
- Episode 55 : Prem raag: Bhag 2
- Episode 56 : Khuda ka dastoor
- Episode 57 : Baap re baap: Bhag 1
- Episode 58 : Baap re baap: Bhag 2
- Episode 59 : Naalayak beta
- Episode 60 : Charon khane chit
- Episode 61 : Ped ki gawahi
- Episode 62 : Saleem bana baadshah: Bhag 1
- Episode 63 : Saleem bana baadshah: Bhag 2
- Episode 64 : Lapata Tansen: Bhag 1
- Episode 65 : Lapata Tansen: Bhag 2
- Episode 66 : Eid mubarak: Bhag 1
- Episode 67 : Eid mubarak: Bhag 2
- Episode 68 : Teej: Bhag 1
- Episode 69 : Teej: Bhag 2
- Episode 70 : Saleem bana Akbar ka baap
- Episode 71 : Andha baba: Bhag 1
- Episode 72 : Andha baba: Bhag 2
- Episode 73 : Dost dost na raha: Bhag 1
- Episode 74 : Dost dost na raha: Bhag 2
- Episode 75 : Rakshabandhan
- Episode 76 : Shor
- Episode 77 : Safai ki aadat
- Episode 78 : Nari shakti
- Episode 79 : Aazadi ki keemat: Bhag 1
- Episode 80 : Aazadi ki keemat: Bhag 2
- Episode 81 : Shaahi kharche ki katauti: Bhag 1
- Episode 82 : Shaahi kharche ki katauti: Bhag 2
- Episode 83 : Poorv janm ka premi: Bhag 1
- Episode 84 : Poorv janm ka premi: Bhag 2
- Episode 85 : Shaahi mali
- Episode 86 : Jyotish ka bhavishy: Bhag 1
- Episode 87 : Jyotish ka bhavishy: Bhag 2
- Episode 88 : Nakli anguthi: Bhag 1
- Episode 89 : Nakli anguthi: Bhag 2
- Episode 90 : Birbal ki khichdi
- Episode 91 : Kar ki chori
- Episode 92 : Aatmvishvas ka jaadoo
- Episode 93 : Janmdin ka tohfa: Bhag 1
- Episode 94 : Janmdin ka tohfa: Bhag 2
- Episode 95 : Sabse badi achchhai
- Episode 96 : Jhooth bolne ki aadat
- Episode 97 : Inamdari
- Episode 98 : Kaatil kaun?
- Episode 99 : Badshah ka hawa mahal
- Episode 100 : Jhanki ki pratiyogita
- Episode 101 : Taj-e-noor:Bhag 1
- Episode 102 : Taj-e-noor:Bhag 2
- Episode 103 : Baldev ka akelapan
- Episode 104 : NA ( PT -- Nakli mohar )
- Episode 105 : NA ( PT -- Mahanta ka guroor )
- Episode 106 : NA ( PT -- Kuye ki shaadi )
- Episode 107 : NA ( PT -- Birbal ka hamshakl: Bhag 1 )
- Episode 108 : NA ( PT -- Birbal ka hamshakl: Bhag 2 )
- Episode 109 : NA ( PT -- Dandiya ki pratiyogita: Bhag 1 )
- Episode 110 : NA ( PT -- Dandiya ki pratiyogita: Bhag 2 )
- Episode 111 : Akbar ki neend
- Episode 112 : Chor pe mor
- Episode 113 : Soundary pratiyogita:Bhag 1
- Episode 114 : Soundary pratiyogita:Bhag 2
- Episode 115 : Dashahara
- Episode 116 : Akbar ki shaahi patang
- Episode 117 : Urvashi ka apaharan
- Episode 118 : Pariyon wala jadoogar
- Episode 119 : Karwa Chauth: Bhag 1
- Episode 120 : Karwa Chauth: Bhag 2
- Episode 121 : Kali zabaan
- Episode 122 : Badshah bana aam aadmi: Bhag 1
- Episode 123 : Badshah bana aam aadmi: Bhag 2
- Episode 124 : Bhulakkad Baadshah
- Episode 125 : Aftaloon bachche
- Episode 126 : Gyan bada ya dhan?
- Episode 127 : Sinhasan ki chori
- Episode 128 : Akbar ki sehatmandi
- Episode 129 : Diwali
- Episode 130 : Bhaidooj
- Episode 131 : Tere sang jiya jaye na: Bhag 1
- Episode 132 : Tere sang jiya jaye na: Bhag 2
- Episode 133 : Kaamchor
- Episode 134 : Noor-e-heera: Bhag 1
- Episode 135 : Noor-e-heera: Bhag 2
- Episode 136 : Jaisi karni waisi bharni
- Episode 137 : Jhooth ke pair nahi hote:Bhag 1
- Episode 138 : Jhooth ke pair nahi hote:Bhag 2
- Episode 139 : Birbal ki keemat
- Episode 140 : Karishmai kalakar:Bhag 1
- Episode 141 : Karishmai kalakar:Bhag 2
- Episode 142 : Vishkanya
- Episode 143 : Rani ka sanyas: Bhag 1
- Episode 144 : Rani ka sanyas: Bhag 2
- Episode 145 : Jo hota hai achchhe ke liye hota hai
- Episode 146 : Maharani Durgawati: Bhag 1
- Episode 147 : Maharani Durgawati: Bhag 2
- Episode 148 : Khooni prem kahani
- Episode 149 : Akbar ki Pahli begam: Bhag 1
- Episode 150 : Akbar ki Pahli begam: Bhag 2
- Episode 151 : Akbar ki Pahli begam: Bhag 3
- Episode 152 : Pishach: Bhag 1
- Episode 153 : Pishach: Bhag 2
- Episode 154 : Aaina
- Episode 155 : Do biwiyan
- Episode 156 : Maut ka shikanja: Bhag 1
- Episode 157 : Maut ka shikanja: Bhag 2
- Episode 158 : Samudri lutere: Bhag 1
- Episode 159 : Samudri lutere: Bhag 2
- Episode 160 : Khoofiya hathiyaar
- Episode 161 : Akbar aur Rani ka jhagda
- Episode 162 : Gahri chaal: Bhag 1
- Episode 163 : Gahri chaal: Bhag 2
- Episode 164 : Sherni ka doodh
- Episode 165 : Maut ka kuan
- Episode 166 : Akbar ka apaharan
- Episode 167 : Dayan: Bhag 1
- Episode 168 : Dayan: Bhag 2
- Episode 169 : Gareebon kee Rani
- Episode 170 : Fauladi purush: Bhag 1
- Episode 171 : Fauladi purush: Bhag 2
- Episode 172 : Akbar par karz
- Episode 173 : Humayun ki atma: Bhag 1
- Episode 174 : Humayun ki atma: Bhag 2
- Episode 175 : Katil kaun: Bhag 1
- Episode 176 : Katil kaun: Bhag 2
- Episode 177 : Sar kata shaitan
- Episode 178 : Bachpan ki mashuka
- Episode 179 : Ichchhadhari nagin
- Episode 180 : Shapit kitab: Bhag 1
- Episode 181 : Shapit kitab: Bhag 2
- Episode 182 : Rani ka pagalpan: Bhag 1
- Episode 183 : Rani ka pagalpan: Bhag 2
- Episode 184 : Mugaliya jasoos
- Episode 185 : Akbar ki maut
- Episode 186 : Akbar aur Rani ka talak
- Episode 187 : Khooni talwar
- Episode 188 : Rani kee chahat bani Akbar ki aafat
- Episode 189 : Kathputli se seekh
- Episode 190 : Rani kee prem kahani
- Episode 191 : Chhammak chhallo
- Episode 192 : Akbar kee zid
- Episode 193 : Bhavishyvani: Bhag 1
- Episode 194 : Bhavishyvani: Bhag 2

          End of Season

=== Season 2 ===
All 158 episodes were released with specific story names in this season presented below.

- Episode 1 : Mulla Do-Piyaza
- Episode 2 : Babar ki talwar
- Episode 3 : Kaan ke kachche
- Episode 4 : Gustakh tota
- Episode 5 : Makar Sankranti
- Episode 6 : Aankhon se bahaduri
- Episode 7 : Rani ka haq
- Episode 8 : Khooni tasveer
- Episode 9 : Akbar ka sawal
- Episode 10 : Sabse bada teerandaz: Bhag 1
- Episode 11 : Sabse bada teerandaz: Bhag 2
- Episode 12 : Sabse bada teerandaz: Bhag 3
- Episode 13 : Akbar ki jooti
- Episode 14 : Mahal main aafat
- Episode 15 : Rani ka sapna
- Episode 16 : Akbar ki shaadi ka joda
- Episode 17 : Shahi mohar: Bhag 1
- Episode 18 : Shahi mohar: Bhag 2
- Episode 19 : Asli mard
- Episode 20 : Kaatil kaun?: Bhag 1
- Episode 21 :
- Episode 22 :
- Episode 23 :
- Episode 24 :
- Episode 25 :
- Episode 26 :
- Episode 27 :
- Episode 28 :
- Episode 29 :
- Episode 30 :
- Episode 31 :
- Episode 32 :
- Episode 33 :
- Episode 34 :
- Episode 35 :
- Episode 36 :
- Episode 37 :
- Episode 38 :
- Episode 39 :
- Episode 40 :
- Episode 41 :
- Episode 42 :
- Episode 43 :
- Episode 44 :
- Episode 45 :
- Episode 46 :
- Episode 47 :
- Episode 48 :
- Episode 49 :
- Episode 50 :
- Episode 51 :
- Episode 52 :
- Episode 53 :
- Episode 54 :
- Episode 55 :
- Episode 56 :
- Episode 57 :
- Episode 58 :
- Episode 59 :
- Episode 60 :
- Episode 61 :
- Episode 62 :
- Episode 63 :
- Episode 64 :
- Episode 65 :
- Episode 66 :
- Episode 67 :
- Episode 68 :
- Episode 69 :
- Episode 70 :
- Episode 71 :
- Episode 72 :
- Episode 73 :
- Episode 74 :
- Episode 75 :
- Episode 76 :
- Episode 77 :
- Episode 78 :
- Episode 79 :
- Episode 80 :
- Episode 81 :
- Episode 82 :
- Episode 83 :
- Episode 84 :
- Episode 85 :
- Episode 86 :
- Episode 87 :
- Episode 88 :
- Episode 89 :
- Episode 90 :
- Episode 91 :
- Episode 92 :
- Episode 93 :
- Episode 94 :
- Episode 95 :
- Episode 96 :
- Episode 97 :
- Episode 98 :
- Episode 99 :
- Episode 100 :
- Episode 101 :
- Episode 102 :
- Episode 103 :
- Episode 104 :
- Episode 105 :
- Episode 106 :
- Episode 107 :
- Episode 108 :
- Episode 109 :
- Episode 110 :
- Episode 111 :
- Episode 112 :
- Episode 113 :
- Episode 114 :
- Episode 115 :
- Episode 116 :
- Episode 117 :
- Episode 118 :
- Episode 119 :
- Episode 120 :
- Episode 121 :
- Episode 122 :
- Episode 123 :
- Episode 124 :
- Episode 125 :
- Episode 126 :
- Episode 127 :
- Episode 128 :
- Episode 129 :
- Episode 130 :
- Episode 131 :
- Episode 132 :
- Episode 133 :
- Episode 134 :
- Episode 135 :
- Episode 136 :
- Episode 137 :
- Episode 138 :
- Episode 139 :
- Episode 140 :
- Episode 141 :
- Episode 142 :
- Episode 143 :
- Episode 144 :
- Episode 145 :
- Episode 146 :
- Episode 147 :
- Episode 148 :
- Episode 149 :
- Episode 150 :
- Episode 151 :
- Episode 152 :
- Episode 153 :
- Episode 154 :
- Episode 155 :
- Episode 156 :
- Episode 157 :
- Episode 158 :

          End of Season

-->

=== Season 3 ===
All 121 episodes were released with specific story names in this season presented below.

- Episode 1 : Akbar Birbal ki wapsi
- Episode 2 : Luteri amma
- Episode 3 : Ek din padhai ek din angadi
- Episode 4 : Rani ka prashikshak
- Episode 5 : Birbal bhaijan
- Episode 6 : Akbar ki bhains lapata
- Episode 7 : Saadhu ka shraap: Bhag 1
- Episode 8 : Saadhu ka shraap: Bhag 2
- Episode 9 : Akbar-ek tasveer: Bhag 1
- Episode 10 : Akbar-ek tasveer: Bhag 2

=== Season 4 ===
All 78 episodes were released with specific story names in this season presented below.

- Episode 1 : Durgavati ki kabar
- Episode 2 : Akbar ki barbaadi: Bhag 1
- Episode 3 : Akbar ki barbaadi: Bhag 2
- Episode 4 : Roti, kapda aur makan
- Episode 5 : Akbar ki yaddasht
- Episode 6 : Birbal ki sajish
- Episode 7 : Saleem ka janamdin
- Episode 8 : Sabse bada inam
- Episode 9 : Akbar ki tanashahi
- Episode 10 : Ganesh Chaturthi Vishesh

=== Season 5 ===
All 28 episodes were released with specific story names in this season presented below.

- Episode 1 :
- Episode 2 :
- Episode 3 :
- Episode 4 :
- Episode 5 :
- Episode 6 :
- Episode 7 :

== Awards ==
=== Indian Telly Awards ===
Year	Nominee / work	Award	Result
2016	Kiku Sharda	Best Actor in a Supporting Role (Comedy)	Won
