= Man Udhan Varyache =

Indian Marathi language television series

- Genre: Drama
- Starring: See below
- Country of origin: India
- Original language: Marathi
- No. of episodes: 684

Production
- Producers: Mahesh Kothare; Adinath Kothare
- Camera setup: Multi-camera
- Running time: 22 minutes
- Production company: Kothare Vision

Original release
- Network: Star Pravah
- Release: 27 July 2009 – 1 October 2011

Related
- Bou Kotha Kao

Man Udhan Varyache (transl. Mind like a Free Wind) is an Indian Marathi language television series that aired on Star Pravah. It stars Neha Gadre, Sharmishtha Raut and Kashyap Parulekar in lead roles. It is an official remake of Bengali TV series Bou Kotha Kao.

== Plot ==
When Nikhil is on a trip with friends to his dad's hometown (village), Shegaon, he meets Gauri, a smart, audacious girl. They immediately develop a rocky relationship and have many tiffs. In a twist of fate, Gauri is abandoned in the mandap on the day of her wedding. To save Gauri and her family from shame, Nikhil finds himself impulsively stepping up to marry her, despite being in a long-term relationship with Neeraja, who is not on this trip. The newly wed couple shock Nikhil's parents, and Gauri faces discrimination and hate from her mother-in-law and Neeraja who conspire against her for a long time. Nikhil's father however bonds quickly with Gauri, through their shared hometown. Nikhil and Gauri are forced to spend time together, and eventually a friendship blooms, and she falls in love with him. However, Gauri sacrifices her love for Nikhil. She steps out of his life when she finds out about his love for Neeraja, but fate has other plans for her. Years later, Nikhil has lost his wife, Neeraja. His daughter, Asmee who is now seven and motherless finds out about Gauri and wants to bring her back as her mother, in a plot inspired by the Bollywood flick, Kuch Kuch Hota Hai. In the meantime Gauri has agreed to marry Raj, who loves her dearly. However, deep within, she still loves Nikhil. On the other hand, Nikhil's mother presses him to marry Aditi, but he still longs for Gauri. They come face to face by a twist of destiny and misunderstandings rise.

== Cast ==
=== Main ===
- Kashyap Parulekar as Nikhil Mohite
- Neha Gadre as Gauri Jadhav / Gauri Nikhil Mohite
- Nisha Shah / Sharmishtha Raut as Neeraja Mohite

=== Recurring ===
- Uday Tikekar as Avinash Mohite; Nikhil's father
- Varsha Usgaonkar as Anuradha Mohite; Nikhil's mother
- Ashwini Ekbote as Manjiri; Nikhil's aunt, Anuradha's sister
- Sanjay Mone as Manjiri's husband
- Rupali Bhosale as Manjiri's daughter, Nikhil's cousin
- Dushyant Wagh as Kunal; Manjiri's son, Nikhil's cousin
- Amit Bhanushali as Siddharth; Ketaki's husband
- Sulekha Talwalkar as Rajani Mohite; Nikhil's aunt
- Poonam Gulati as Aditi; Rajani's niece
- Girish Oak as Avinash's friend
- Prajakta Dighe-Kulkarni as Neeraja's mother
- Seema Deshmukh as Nikhil's aunt, Avinash's sister
- Amit Kalyankar as Sandy; Nikhil's friend
- Vishakha Subhedar as Manorama

== Adaptations ==
Language	Title	Original release	Network(s)	Last aired	Notes
Bengali	Bou Kotha Kao বৰ কথা কও	5 January 2009	Star Jalsha	14 January 2012	Original
Marathi	Man Udhan Varyache मन उधाण वाऱ्याचे	27 July 2009	Star Pravah	1 October 2011	Remake
Hindi	Gustakh Dil गुस्ताख दिल	5 August 2013	Life OK	4 November 2014	Remake

== Reception ==
=== Ratings ===
Week	Year	TAM TVR	Rank		Ref.
Week	Year	TAM TVR	Mah/Goa	All India	Ref.
Week 6	2011	1.01	3	69	
Week 10	2011	0.75	2	82	
Week 26	2011	0.97	1	63	
