= Tuza Maza Breakup =

Marathi-language drama series

- Genre: Drama
- Written by: Madhugandha Kulkarni
- Starring: See below
- Country of origin: India
- Original language: Marathi
- No. of episodes: 286

Production
- Production locations: Mumbai, Maharashtra, India
- Camera setup: Multi-camera
- Running time: 22 minutes
- Production company: Someel Creations

Original release
- Network: Zee Marathi
- Release: 18 September 2017 – 11 August 2018

Tuza Maza Breakup (transl. Yours and my Breakup) is a Marathi language television drama series. It starred Ketaki Chitale and Sainkeet Kamat in lead roles. The series premiered on Zee Marathi by replacing Khulta Kali Khulena.

== Cast ==
=== Main ===
- Ketaki Chitale as Meera Sameer Desai
- Sainkeet Kamat as Sameer Sharad Desai

=== Recurring ===
Sameer's family

- Uday Tikekar as Sharad Desai
- Radhika Harshe as Lata Sharad Desai
- Rohini Hattangadi as Tilottama Desai
- Mohiniraj Gatne as Sameer's uncle
- Sanyogita Bhave as Ashwini Desai

Meera's family

- Vijay Nikam as Mangesh Rane
- Rekha Badhe as Bharati Mangesh Rane
- Neeta Pendse as Nanda Rane
- Shivraj Walvekar as Meera's father
- Reshma Ramchandra as Madhura Rane
- Mohit Gokhale as Tejas Mangesh Rane

Others

- Umesh Jagtap as Satyawan Arnalkar
- Sanjeevani Patil as Mrs. Pradhan
- Maadhav Deochake as Rajneesh Pradhan
- Meera Joshi as Menaka Agarwal
- Ujjwala Jog as Mrs. Wagle
- Ashutosh Gokhale as Sameer's friend

== Reception ==
Week	Year	BARC Viewership		Ref.
Week	Year	TRP	Rank	Ref.
Week 15	2018	2.9	3	
Week 19	2018	2.9	4	
