= Saraswati (TV series) =

2015 Indian Marathi-language TV series

- Genre: Family drama Soap opera
- Written by: Chinmay Mandlekar
- Directed by: Mangesh Kanthale
- Starring: See below
- Country of origin: India
- Original language: Marathi
- No. of episodes: 760

Production
- Camera setup: Multi-camera
- Running time: 22 minutes

Original release
- Network: Colors Marathi
- Release: 28 December 2015 – 12 May 2018

Saraswati is an Indian Marathi language television series which aired on Colors Marathi. The show starred Titeeksha Tawde and Astad Kale in lead roles. The series premiered from 28 December 2015 and ended on 12 May 2018.

== Plot ==
It is the story of a 20-year-old girl Saraswati. She fulfils the duties of a daughter, a sister, a friend, a wife, and a leader with aplomb. She is the strength of her family. She is determined to overcome every hurdle to fulfil her promises.

== Cast ==
=== Main ===
- Titeeksha Tawde as Saraswati
- Astad Kale / Amit Khedekar as Raghav

=== Recurring ===
- Sulekha Talwalkar as Aaisaheb
- Jui Gadkari as Devika
- Milind Shinde as Bhujang
- Sunil Barve
- Maadhav Deochake as Kanha
- Harish Dudhade as Ranjeet
- Akshaya Hindalkar / Sonal Pawar as Vandana
- Mayuri Kapadane as Renuka
- Sangram Salvi as Sarjerao
- Siddheshwar Zadbuke as Vishram
- Shekhar Phadake
- Pooja Nayak
- Shraddha Ketkar
- Yogesh Shirsat
- Rasik Raj
