= Resham Tipnis =

Indian actress (born 1972/73)

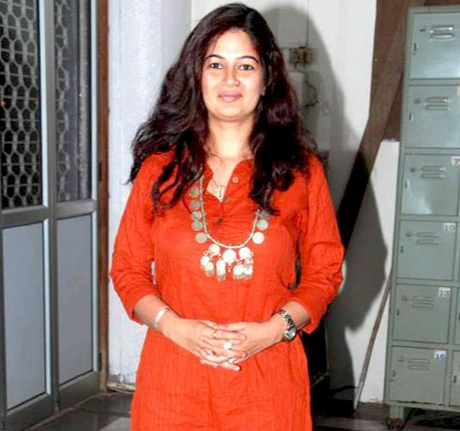
- Resham in 2020
- Born: 28 August 1973 (age 53); Mumbai, Maharashtra
- Occupation: Actress
- Years active: 1993-present
- Known for: Shrimaan Shrimati; Tu Tu Main Main; Sahib Biwi Aur Boss; Bigg Boss Marathi 1 .
- Spouse: Sanjeev Seth (m. 1993; div. 2004)
- Children: 2

Resham Tipnis is an Indian actress known for working in Hindi and Marathi television and films. She started her career with a small role of Anjali Sinha in the Shah Rukh Khan starrer film Baazigar in 1993. She is best known for her roles in sitcoms Shrimaan Shrimati, Tu Tu Main Main and Sahib Biwi Aur Boss.

She participated as a contestant on Bigg Boss Marathi season 1 in 2018 and was eliminated a week before the grand finale.

She is also known for her role in Sony Entertainment Television's Punyashlok Ahilyabai as Maharani Dwarka Holkar after an 8-year leap from July 2022 to October 2023.

== Personal life ==
Tipnis married actor Sanjeev Seth in 1993 at the age of 20, but they divorced in 2004. They have two children Manav and Rishika. As of 2018, she is in a relationship with Sandesh Kirtikar.

== Filmography ==
=== Films ===
Year	Title	Role	Language	Notes
1992	Jiwalagaa	Jyoti Dixit	Marathi	
1992	Apan Yana Pahilat Ka	Chhaya	Marathi	
1993	Baazigar	Anjali Sinha	Hindi	
1993	Bhishma Pratigyan	Lead role	Odia	
1993	Bharla Ha Malvat Raktana	Vimal	Marathi	
1995	Nilambari	Nilambari	Marathi	
1998	Satvapariksha	Menka/Meera	Marathi	
2000	Mrugjal - Ek Naslela Astitva	Sharmila Joglekar	Marathi	
2000	Astitva	Sudha	Marathi	
2000	Le Chal Apne Sang	Resham	Hindi	
2002	Hathyar : Face to Face With Reality	Jyoti Deshmukh	Hindi	
2002	Mere Yaar ki Shaadi Hai	Neelima	Hindi	
2002	Aadhaar	Herself	Marathi	In the song 'SaajannTuza Hay Kasa '
2003	Chimani Pakhar	Mrs. Karnik	Marathi	
2004	Ishq Hai Tumse	Anjali Bhabhi	Hindi	
2004	Khabardar	Herself	Marathi	In the song 'Cham Cham Karta'
2007	Bakula Namdeo Ghotale	Herself	Marathi	In the song 'Aiwaj Hawali Kela'
2007	Hyancha Kahi Nem Nahi	Heera's love interest	Marathi	
2009	Man Sanmaan	Step Daughter-in-Law	Marathi	
2010	City of Gold	Lavani Dancer (Special Appearance) in the Song "Tujya Girnicha Vajude Bhonga"	Hindi	Lalbaug Parel: Mumbai Zaali Sonayachi as Marathi Film
2010	Ladi Godi	Sridevi	Marathi	
2012	Arohi Goshta Tighanchi	Rashmi	Marathi	
2013	Deewana Main Deewana	Basant's Sister-in-law	Hindi	
2013	Kho-Kho	Pakya's women	Marathi	
2014	Jai Ho	Meghna Shah	Hindi	
2014	Premasathi Coming Suun	Antara's Mami	Marathi	
2014	Be Dune Saade Char		Marathi	
2018	Bucket List	Lavina Mavera	Marathi	
2022	BhauBali	Malvika Bhandarkar	Marathi	
2024	Lochya Zaala Re	Ruby	Marathi	
2024	Aflatoon	Passenger	Marathi	Cameo appearance

=== Television ===
Year	Show	Role	Language
1993-1999	Zee Horror Show	Episodic Roles	Hindi
1993	Campus	Anjali Narang	Hindi
1994-1997	Shrimaan Shrimati	Kokila's friend	Hindi
1994-1996	Tu Tu Main Main	Guddie	Hindi
1998	Gudgudee	Kanchan (raghu's wife)	Hindi
1997-1998	Rani Ketaki Ki Kahani	Madan	Hindi
2003-2004	Kyunki Saas Bhi Kabhi Bahu Thi	Kesar Anupam Kapadia	Hindi
2001	Chandan Ka Palna Resham Ki Dori	Shikha	Hindi
2003-2004	Karishma – The Miracles Of Destiny	Natasha	Hindi
2005	Woh Rehne Waali Mehlon Ki	Aarti Goyal	Hindi
2005-2006	Ya Sukhano Ya	Grishma Sarangdhar	Marathi
2006-2007	Ghar Ek Sapnaa	Trisha	Hindi
2008-2009	Baa Bahoo Aur Baby	Devki	Hindi
2009	Basera	Rasili Parikh	Hindi
2013	Mujhse Kuchh Kehti...Yeh Khamoshiyaan	Asawari Bhosle	Hindi
2013-2014	Do Dil Ek Jaan	Saroj	Hindi
2014	Satrangi Sasural	Babita	Hindi
2014	Adaalat	Sakku	Hindi
2015-2016	Sahib Biwi Aur Boss	Mandodari	Hindi
2017	Half Marriage	Janaki	Hindi
2018	Bigg Boss Marathi season 1	Contestant (Semi finalist) (Evicted on Day 91)	Marathi
2018	Assal Pahune Irsaal Namune	Herself/Guest	Marathi
2019	Ek Tappa Out	Mentor	Marathi
2019	Ekdam Kadak	Herself/Guest	Marathi
2019	Bigg Boss Marathi season 2	Herself/Guest	Marathi
2021	Kuch Toh Hai	Rageshwari Khurana	Hindi
2021	Bigg Boss Marathi season 3	Guest appearance	Marathi
2021-2025	Aboli	Vijaya Rajadhyaksh	Marathi
2022	Brij Ke Gopal	Malathi	Hindi
2022	Punyashlok Ahilyabai	Dwarkabai Sahib Holkar	Hindi
2024	Antarpaat	Vidula Salvi	Marathi
2025	Pyaar Ki Raahein	Indu Shekhawat	Hindi
2026	Yeh Fitoor Tera	Sakshi Saxena	Hindi

== See also ==
- List of Indian television actresses
