= Shiv Thakare =

Indian television personality

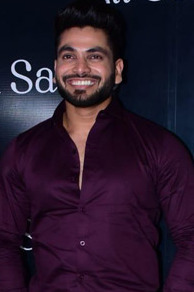
- Thakare in 2023
- Born: Shiv Manoharrao Uttamrao Jhinguji Ganuji Thakare; 9 September 1991 (age 35); Amravati, Maharashtra, India
- Education: G. H. Raisoni College of Engineering, Nagpur
- Occupation: Reality TV Personality; Choreographer
- Years active: 2017–present
- Known for: Bigg Boss Marathi 2; MTV Roadies Rising; Bigg Boss 16
- Height: 1.75 m (5 ft 9 in)

Shiv Thakare (born 9 September 1991) is an Indian reality television personality known for participating in reality shows like MTV Roadies Rising, Bigg Boss 16, Khatron Ke Khiladi 13 and Jhalak Dikhhla Jaa 11. He also won Bigg Boss Marathi 2 and The 50.

== Early life and family ==
Thakare was born as Shiv Manoharrao Uttamrao Jhinguji Ganuji Sambhaji Shivaji Thakare on 9 September in Amravati, Maharashtra. At an early age, he began supporting his father Manohar Thakare who worked at a betel leaf shop. He later sold milk packets and newspapers to support his family.

He dated Veena Jagtap, a fellow contestant in his season of Bigg Boss Marathi. During the show, Shiv got Veena's name tattooed on his right hand, as part of a task. They split up in 2022.

== Career ==
Thakare is best known for his role as a reality television personality. His journey began with the reality show MTV Roadies Rising in 2017, in which he reached the semi-finals. Subsequently, he appeared in MTV's The Anti Social Network. In 2019, He participated in the Marathi reality-program Bigg Boss Marathi 2 and ended up winning the show In 2020, he joined the panel of MTV Roadies Revolution as a judge in the audition rounds.

In March 2021, he launched his entrepreneurial project, a deodorant brand called "B.Real".

From October 2022 to February 2023, he was seen participating in Colors TV's reality show Bigg Boss 16, where he finished as the 1st runner-up.

== Media image ==
He was ranked twenty-first in The Times of India's Top 30 Most Desirable Men of Maharashtra in 2019. He was ranked First in The Times of India's Top 15 Most Desirable Men on Marathi Television in 2019.

== Filmography ==
=== Television ===
Year	Title	Role	Notes	Ref.
2017	MTV Roadies 14	Contestant	6th place	
2019	Bigg Boss Marathi 2	Contestant	Winner	
2022–2023	Bigg Boss 16	Contestant	1st runner-up	
2023	Khatron Ke Khiladi 13	Contestant	5th place	
2023–2024	Jhalak Dikhhla Jaa 11	Contestant	6th place	
2026	The 50 season 1	Contestant	Winner	

=== Music video ===
Year	Title	Singer(s)	Language	Ref.
2020	Kasa Chandra	Swapnil Bandodkar	Marathi	
2023	Koi Baat Nahi	Saaj Bhatt	Hindi	
2025	Mere Humnava	Arghya	Hindi	
2025	Rajj Rajj Nachan	Divya Kumar, Ishika Hirve, Sikandar Maan	Hindi/ Punjabi	
2025	Patience	Pranay Pawar	Hindi	
2025	Kanha Krishna Murari	Seeta Qasemie	Hindi	
2026	Me Dhurandhar	Swager Boy, Mohammed Sadiq, Ranjit Kaur	Marathi	
2026	Masoli Sonyawani	Keval Walanj, Shuddhi Kadam	Marathi	

== Awards ==
Year	Award	Category	Work	Result	Ref.
2023	Iconic Gold Awards	Bigg Boss Famous Personality	—N/a	Won	
2025	Suvarnaratna Awards	Style Icon	—N/a	Won	
