= Warraich =

Warraich is a surname. Notable people with the surname include:

- Suhail Warraich (born 1961), Pakistani journalist, television host, analyst and media personality
- Moin Nawaz Warraich (born 1949), Pakistani politician and retired military officer
- Farrukh Shahbaz Warraich (born 1980), Pakistani journalist, Urdu columnist and political analyst
- Imtiaz Safdar Warraich (born 1952), Pakistani politician
- Muhammad Abdullah Warraich, Pakistani politician
- Bilal Asghar Warraich, Pakistani politician
- Javed Iqbal Warraich, Pakistani politician
- Gul Nawaz Warraich, Pakistani politician
- Aman Ullah Warraich, Pakistani politician
- Chaudhry Arshad Javaid Warraich, Pakistani politician
- Chaudhry Muhammad Ashraf Warraich, Pakistani politician
- Zawar Hussain Warraich, Pakistani politician
- Tashakul Abbas Warraich, Pakistani politician

== See also ==
- Warraich (clan), a Jat clan
