= Bigg Boss Marathi season 3 =

Indian Marathi reality show

Bigg Boss Marathi
- Season 3
- Presented by: Mahesh Manjrekar
- No. of days: 98
- No. of housemates: 17
- Winner: Vishal Nikam
- Runner-up: Jay Dudhane
- No. of episodes: 99

Release
- Original network: Colors Marathi; Voot Select
- Original release: 19 September – 26 December 2021

Season chronology
- ← Previous; Season 2 Next → Season 4

Bigg Boss Marathi 3 is the third season of the Marathi version of the reality television show Bigg Boss broadcast in India. The grand premiere was held on 19 September 2021 on Colors Marathi and Voot with Mahesh Manjrekar as the host for the third time. The Grand Finale was held on 26 December 2021 where Vishal Nikam became the winner and Jay Dudhane became the runner-up.

== Production ==
=== Delay ===
The show was expected to launch from May 2020, but due to COVID-19 pandemic in Maharashtra the show was delayed for a year and postponed to 2021.

=== Eye logo ===
The border of the eye is golden with a medium turquoise background. Electric lines come from the background of the eye. A golden pipe-like stem joined the eye border to the big center iris.

=== Teaser ===
On 21 June 2021, the makers had officially launched the season 3 promo on Colors Marathi. Actor-filmmaker Mahesh Manjrekar confirmed his return to host the show.

=== House ===
For the third season of Bigg Boss Marathi, the house has been given maximum Maharashtrian traditional touch. They gave Maharashtrian elements on every wall of the house. Wood is used in the house and green and red colors are used more.

=== Special episode ===
- 19 September 2021 (4 hours)
- 15 October 2021 (2 hours)

== Housemates status ==
Sr no.	Housemate	Day entered	Day exited	Status
1	Vishal	Day 1	Day 98	Winner
2	Jay	Day 1	Day 98	1st Runner-up
3	Vikas	Day 1	Day 98	2nd Runner-up
4	Utkarsh	Day 1	Day 98	3rd Runner-up
5	Meenal	Day 1	Day 98	4th Runner-up
6	Mira	Day 1	Day 95	Evicted
7	Sonali	Day 1	Day 91	Evicted
8	Gayatri	Day 1	Day 84	Evicted
9	Sneha	Day 1	Day 70	Evicted
10	Santosh	Day 1	Day 63	Evicted
11	Neetha	Day 42	Day 56	Evicted
12	Trupti	Day 1	Day 49	Evicted
13	Avishkar	Day 1	Day 42	Evicted
14	Adish	Day 20	Day 35	Evicted
15	Surekha	Day 1	Day 28	Evicted
16	Akshay	Day 1	Day 21	Evicted
17	Shivlila	Day 1	Day 13	Walked

== Housemates ==
=== Original entrants ===
The participants in the order of appearance and entry in house are:

- Sonali Patil - Television actress and model. Known for playing the lead role in Vaiju No.1 and Aarya Deshmukh in Devmanus. She made her debut in Sony Marathi's Julta Julta Jultay Ki. Before starting career as an actress she was a professor in renowned college.
- Vishal Nikam - Television actor and model. Known for playing lead role in Dakkhancha Raja Jotiba and Sata Jalmachya Gathi. Currently, he was seen in Jay Bhawani Jay Shivaji as Shiva Kashid.
- Sneha Wagh - Television actress. She made her debut with Marathi serial Kaata Rute Kunala where she played the role of Chandana. Known for playing the role of Jyoti in Imagine TV's Jyoti. She played the role of Moora in the show Chandragupt Maurya telecasted on SET.
- Utkarsh Shinde - Doctor and singer. He records Ambedkarite songs and Marathi language film songs. He is the son of Marathi singer Anand Shinde and elder brother of Adarsh Shinde.
- Mira Jagannath - Television actress. Known for playing the role of Momo in Yeu Kashi Tashi Me Nandayla and supporting role in Majhya Navaryachi Bayko.
- Trupti Desai - Social activist.
- Avishkar Darwhekar - Film and television actor. mainly acted as supporting character in Tu Majha Saangaati, Hya Gojirwanya Gharat, Adhuri Ek Kahani. He also did many films such as Maan Sanmaan, Mi Tulas Tujhya Angani, Kiran Kulkarni v/s Kiran Kulkarni, etc.
- Surekha Kudachi - Television actress and dancer. Known for negative roles in Swabhiman – Shodh Astitvacha, Devyani, Chandra Aahe Sakshila and many more.
- Gayatri Datar - Television actress. Known for playing the lead role in Tula Pahate Re. She was a contestant of Marathi dancing reality show Yuva Dancing Queen and Comedy show Chala Hawa Yeu Dya.
- Vikas Patil - Television actor. Known for playing the lead role in Bayko Ashi Havvi, Lek Majhi Ladki, Suvasini and Vartul.
- Shivlila Patil - Kirtankar
- Jay Dudhane - Reality television actor and entrepreneur, winner of MTV Splitsvilla X3.
- Meenal Shah - Television actor and model, participated in MTV Roadies Rising.
- Akshay Waghmare - Film and television actor. Known for playing the lead role in Ti Phulrani.
- Santosh Choudhari - Singer. Mainly sings Koligeets and also known as Dadus.

=== Wild-Card entrants ===
- Adish Vaidya – Television actor. Mainly works in marathi and hindi television. Known for playing the role of Archis Naik in Ratris Khel Chale and Mohit Chavan in Ghum Hai Kisikey Pyaar Meiin. He also played supporting roles in Barrister Babu and Saam Daam Dand Bhed. He also portrayed a negative role as a cheel in Naagin.
- Neetha Shetty - Television actress. Mainly works in Hindi television. She is best known for the TV series Ghar Ki Lakshmi Betiyann as Gauri and in Kahiin To Hoga as Dr. Archita.

== Twists ==
- Mahesh Manjrekar introduces new secret room i.e. "Temptation Room", where contestants will get a chance to have a phone call or get info about other contestants, but for that they will have to sacrifice something.
- Every week contestants will get a new theme.

=== Themes ===
Week	Theme	Property	Owner	Worker
1	Ladies Special	Gym	Sonali	Santosh
1	Ladies Special	Kitchen (Night)	Sneha	Jay; Vishal
1	Ladies Special	Bedroom	Mira	Avishkar
1	Ladies Special	Dishes	Trupti	Utkarsh; Akshay
1	Ladies Special	Kitchen (Day)	Surekha	Santosh; Avishkar
1	Ladies Special	Living+Dining	Gayatri	Jay
1	Ladies Special	Garden	Shivlila	Vikas
1	Ladies Special	Bathroom	Meenal	Vikas

=== Jodi Ki Bedi ===
Contestants	Pair
Akshay	Utkarsh
Avishkar	Meenal and Shivlila
Gayatri	Jay
Jay	Gayatri
Mira	Sneha
Meenal	Shivlila and Avishkar
Santosh	Trupti
Shivlila	Avishkar and Meenal
Sneha	Mira
Sonali	Surekha
Surekha	Sonali
Trupti	Santosh
Utkarsh	Akshay
Vikas	Vishal
Vishal	Vikas

== Weekly Summary ==
Week 1	Entrances	On Grand Premiere, Sonali, Vishal, Sneha, Utkarsh, Gayatri, Vikas, Mira, Surekha, Trupti, Avishkar, Jay, Akshay, Meenal, Shivlila and Santosh entered the house as housemates.
Week 1	Twist	On Grand Premiere, Mahesh tells every week contestants will get new theme and the first week theme is Ladies Special and according to that all the female contestants will be given a share of the house which they will have the right to and the male contestants will be under their hands as servants.
Week 1	Nomination	**Takau Ki Tikau (Waste or Durable)** On Day 1, For the first nomination of the season, Bigg Boss divided women and men. Women can only nominate men, and men can only nominate women and for that, each member wants to nominate one of the two contestants near the swimming pool, save one and nominate one, and push the nominated member into the swimming pool. As a result Utkarsh, Vishal, Sneha, Gayatri, Trupti, Santosh, Avishkar, Vikas, Mira, Meenal and Shivlila were nominated.
Week 1	Main task	**Chiu Tai Chiu Tai Daar Ughad (Sparrow Sparrow open the door)** On Day 2, Bigg Boss announced task. In this task a sparrow was erected in the garden area. Male contestants used to convince female to participate in this task and female used to choose any two male contestants. In the first buzzer female contestants selects Utkarsh and Vikas and the two are given the task of Bigg Boss. **First round** First round is for the Utkarsh and Vikas and they have to put the personal luggages of the female contestants in a box and the one who keeps the most luggages they will be the winner of the task but to do that they have to convince female to get the private luggages. As a result, Utkarsh wins this round by getting the most stuff. **Second round** In the second buzzer, female contestants selects Vishal and Akshay for the second round and for that round two rickshaws were parked in the garden area and Akshay and Vishal were the rickshaw pullers. The rickshaw pullers would drive the rickshaw to the garden area till the next buzzer and the female contestants would ask for a lift and the rickshaw pullers would convince them not to sit on rickshaw and the one who would put the female contestants in the rickshaw less often would be the winner. The Big Boss then orders the female contestants to unanimously decide which one of the contestant to win, but they do not agree. Then Bigg Boss cancels this round. **Third round** In the third buzzer, the female contestants select Vikas and Jay for the third round and in that round they want to be the slaves of Sneha, Meera and Trupti. They do what they tell them to do. If one of them denied he will be disqualified. **Fourth round** In the fourth buzzer, the female contestants select Akshay and Santosh and for this the Big Boss assigns them the task that one contestant of Akshay and Santosh is a dirty chef and one contestant is a sudden guest. It is mandatory for the guests to eat the food prepared by the dirty chef. **Fifth round** In the fifth Buzzer, the female contestants select the Vikas and Utkarsh for the 4th round and for that they are entrusted with the task of fashion show. In this task both contestants have to dress like women and also convince any one girl to wear men's clothes and at the end of the task Uday wins. Bigg Boss gives Utkarsh the exclusive right to choose any one female contestant as second winner and Utkarsh decides Mira to be the winner.
Week 1	Result	**Winner (first round) – Utkarsh**
Week 1	Result	**Failed (first round) – Vikas**
Week 1	Result	Second round was cancelled due to disagreement of some members
Week 1	Result	**Winner (third round) – Vikas**
Week 1	Result	**Failed (third round) – Jay**
Week 1	Result	Fourth round also cancelled due to disagreement of some members
Week 1	Result	**Winner (fifth round) – Utkarsh**
Week 1	Result	**Failed (fifth round) – Vikas**
Week 1	Captaincy Contenders	Utkarsh and Mira
Week 1	Captaincy or Temptation task	**Khel Fasyacha (Game of Dice)**; On Day 4, Big Boss announced new task & This task was called Khel Fasyacha. This task consists of a dice with three red sides and three blue sides with poster of that contestant. The red side was Utkarsh and the blue side was Mira. The winner will be whose color and poster are at the top of the side. As a result Utkarsh wins the task then Bigg Boss asked Utkarsh choose between captaincy or temptation then Utkarsh choose captaincy over temptation. Then Bigg Boss also announced that temptation room goes to the runner up of the task i.e. Mira.
Week 1	Result	**Winner (Captaincy) – Utkarsh**
Week 1	Result	**Failed Captaincy but won Temptation room - Mira**:
Week 1	Exits	There was no eviction in the first week.
Week 2	Twist	Second week theme is Jodi Ki Bedi and according to that all contestants have to paired with another contestants. All contestants were paired up as connections: 1. Akshay and Utkarsh; 2. Gayatri and Jay; 3. Mira and Sneha; 4. Santosh and Trupti; 5. Sonali and Surekha; 6. Vikas and Vishal; 7. Avishkar, Meenal and Shivlila
Week 2	Nomination	**Naav Mothe Lakshan Khote (Name is Big and Sign False)** On Day 8, Bigg Boss announces a task whose name is Naav Mothe Lakshan Khote. Pairs assigned to this task fight with other pairs. Each pair goes into the activity room and nominates any two pairs they feel and smashes their nameplates with a hammer. As a result: Gayatri-Jay, Vikas-Vishal and Avishkar-Meenal-Shivlila were nominated.
Week 2	Main task	**Halla Bol (Speak Attack)**; On Day 9, Bigg Boss announced a weekly task called Halla Bol. In this task a sidecar motorcycle was erected in the garden area and two teams were formed, Team A and Team B. Each pair from both teams would sit on the motorcycle one by one and the other team members must try to disturb them and make them leave the bike. **Team A -** Jay-Gayatri, Trupti-Santosh, Sneha-Mira, Akshay-Utkarsh **Team B -** Sonali-Surekha, Avishkar-Meenal, Vishal-Vikas
Week 2	Result	**Winner (Team A) – Jay-Gayatri, Trupti-Santosh, Sneha-Mira, Akshay-Utkarsh**
Week 2	Result	**Failed (Team B) – Sonali-Surekha, Avishkar-Meenal, Vishal-Vikas**
Week 2	Captaincy Contenders	Jay and Gayatri
Week 2	Captaincy task	**Khulja Sim Sim (Open Up!)**; On Day 11, Bigg Boss announces a task called Khulja Sim Sim. In this task, the numbers from 0 to 9 were placed in the garden area and when the buzzer sounded, each member must take the number plate he wanted and also a very large password board was put up in the garden area. Contenders used to request the person who has the password number on the board to ask for the password. At the end of the task, both contenders did not get the full password and the task was cancelled.
Week 2	Result	No captain as they lost the task
Week 2	Exits	On Day 10, Shivlila Patil exited the show as an emergency due to some health issues.
Week 3	Nomination	**Telephone Charge Karaycha Naay (No Need To Charge Telephone)**; Bigg Boss announced a new nomination task 'Telephone Charge Karaycha Naaay' in which each housemate got a dummy telephone belonging to other contestants. If they want to save the contestant, they have to charge the dummy telephone of the contestant in the charging booth. If they want to nominate a contestant, they should not charge the contestant's telephone. As a result: Akshay, Santosh, Surekha, Vishal, Trupti and Sneha were nominated.
Week 3	Main task	**Majhe Madke Bhari, Dusryache Madke Fodi (Filling My Pots, Breaking Pots Of Others)**; Bigg Boss gave new task to the contestants. The task was named as, 'Majhe Madke Bhari, Dusryache Madke Fodi' in which, Bigg Boss gave pots (Madke) to Team A and Team B. Both the teams had to paint the pots and protect those from the other team but suddenly both team breaking pots of other team.: **Jinku Kiva Ladhu (Win or Fight)**; After cancelled Majhe Madke Bhari task Bigg Boss announced a new task called Jinku Kiva Ladhu in that task Bigg Boss gave them new challenges and all contestants have to challenged themselves. First round has Kode task in which all contestants have to solve puzzles which was given by Bigg Boss and win. Second round has 3 rings of different colours are kept in the garden area and after every buzzer, the contestants are supposed to walk on those rings. Also, they have to follow Sanchalak's instructions simultaneously. Sanchalak is asked to instruct them and command, ‘Walk fast’, ‘Walk slowly’ and ‘Turn’. The contestants are also asked to hold a bowl full of water in their hands and the one, who spills the maximum amount of water in a particular round, will be declared as failure and last round has Fal Nishfal task in which both team have to collect fruits from store room and one contestant will go into the swimming pool and other contestant will pass the fruits and which team pass maximum fruits in a particular round, will be declared as winner.
Week 3	Result	Majhe Madke Bhari, Dusryache Madke Fodi task was cancelled after poor behaviour of contestants
Week 3	Result	**Winner of Jinku Kiva Ladhu task (Team A) –Jay, Vishal, Trupti, Mira, Santosh, Sneha and Sonali**
Week 3	Result	**Failed of Jinku Kiva Ladhu task (Team B) – Vikas, Meenal, Gayatri, Akshay, Utkarsh, Surekha and Avishkar**
Week 3	Punishment	According to Bigg Boss's weekly task, the team that loses will face some punishment. After losing most of the rounds by Team B, They had to give up household utensils, furniture, bathrooms, toilets, and fruits.
Week 3	Captaincy Contenders	Jay and Vishal
Week 3	Captaincy task	**Chance Pe Dance** Bigg Boss gave Chance Pe Dance captaincy task to the contestants in which contestants had to perform a dance in a pair and show their support to the contenders. Bigg Boss later announced that Jay Dudhane and Vishal Nikam are similar in votes and due to the tie, there will be no captain in the Bigg Boss house this week too.
Week 3	Result	No captain as tie between both contenders in the task
Week 3	Exits	On Day 21, Akshay Waghmare was evicted after facing public votes.
Week 4	Entrances	On Day 22, Adish Vaidya entered as the first wild card entrant.
Week 4	Twist	Adish was taken to the temptation room before going main house where he was given a chance to get a power card and given him the right to be the captain. For that he had to choose three contestants from the house who would guard the front door every night. Adish chooses Jay, Meenal and Santosh as guards.
Week 4	Twist	On Day 28, after getting evicted, Surekha earned the power to make one housemate become the house captain for next week and as a result, Trupti became the house captain.
Week 4	Nomination	**Safar Kara Mastine (Have Fun Travelling)**; On Day 22, Bigg Boss gave an nomination task to the contestants named 'Safar Kara Mastine.' Bigg Boss had given five bags to contestants, and the contestants who successfully get those five bags first will get the chance to sit in the Jeep first. As per the task, only five contestants will sit in the jeep and there will be five rounds in the task. In each round, unanimously, one contestant has to get down from the jeep, and one contestant from outside has to replace him / her. Those Five contestants in the last and the fifth round will be safe from the elimination. As a result, Meenal, Vikas, Vishal, Sonali, Sneha, Surekha, Trupti and Santosh were nominated. Adish was safe as he was a wild-card contestant.
Week 4	Main task	**BB College**; On Day 23, Bigg Boss announced a new weekly task named 'BB College'. Utkarsh is selected as the Maths teacher, Sonali as the Love chemistry teacher, Surekha as the dance teacher, Santosh as the Music teacher, Mira as the Value education teacher and Adish as the PT teacher while other contestants play students. The four teachers are allocated four boards in the garden area. On the sound of every bell, one teacher has to conduct their lectures while the students have to decide whether to attend or skip it. The students also have the power to destroy their respective boards with markers. After every lecture, the teachers have to give a star to their favourite student whom they want to choose as the contender for captaincy. The student with maximum star and the teacher with the cleanest board will be selected for the captaincy task.
Week 4	Result	**Winner of BB College task – Sneha, Vishal (students) and Surekha (teacher)**
Week 4	Result	**Failed of BB College task – Everyone else (students and teachers)**
Week 4	Captaincy Contenders	Sneha, Vishal and Surekha
Week 4	Captaincy task	**Lava Poster Bana Master (Put Posters, Become Master)**; On Day 25, Bigg Boss assigned a task 'Lava Poster Bana Master' in which the contenders with the help of two assistants ('Samarthak') would have to paste and print posters on a wall and the person with most posters would be the winner and the captain in the incoming week. Trupti was the sanchalak. Vishal chose Vikas and Adish, Sneha chose Jay and Gayatri, and Surekha chose Mira and Utkarsh as their 'samarthak' respectively.
Week 4	Result	Since Vishal had no posters, Sneha and Surekha only had one poster each which were both upside down, the task remained undecided and there was no captain for the next week.
Week 4	House captain selection	On Day 28, Surekha got the power to make one contestant become the house captain after her eviction and she chose Trupti.
Week 4	Celebration	On Day 26, Bigg Boss announced a special "Garba Night" for contestants, in which there were seven passes for the contestants. Bigg Boss asked Surekha, Sneha and Vishal to choose seven people out of the fourteen contestants for the celebration. Sur Nava Dhyas Nava fame Akshaya Iyer and Vishwajit Borwankar were the special guests for the garba night.
Week 4	Exits	On Day 28, Surekha Kudachi was evicted after facing public votes.
Week 5	Twist	Fifth week theme is 'Aaji Special'. A statue of Aaji is set up in the garden area. Bigg Boss announced that Aaji will keep watch on all the housemates and will also give them tasks.
Week 5	Nomination	On Day 29, Aaji gave the housemates their nomination task. She had given diamonds to the contestants. The diamonds will be placed in a pot and the contestants who will grab it first from the pot will get a chance to safe another contestant. Since Trupti was the house captain, she was saved from the nomination task. In the first round, Jay got the diamond first and saved Utkarsh from nomination. Then in the second round, Utkarsh got the diamond and saved Jay from the nomination. Then in the third round, Adish got the diamond and saved Avishkar. In the fourth round, Meenal got the diamond and saved Sonali. In the fifth round, Jay got the diamond for the second time and saved Gayatri. In the sixth round, Utkarsh got the diamond again and saved Mira. In the seventh round, Santosh got the diamond and saved Sneha. Then at the eighth and last round, Meenal got the diamond again and saved Vishal from the nomination. As a result, Santosh, Vikas, Meenal and Adish were nominated for eviction.
Week 5	Main task	**Mhataricha Bhopla (Old Lady's Pumpkin)**; On Day 30, Bigg Boss announces a weekly task for the housemates named Mhataricha Bhopla. For the task, a Mhataricha (Old Lady's) house is made in the garden area and the housemates are divided into two teams. Trupti is chosen as the supervisor of this task. The members of team A (Jay, Gayatri, Utkarsh, Sneha, Santosh and Vikas) become the animals whereas Team B members (Vishal, Mira, Meenal, Avishkar, Adish and Sonali) become the Mhataris (Old Lady's). According to this task, team B members are initially locked inside the Jail and their eyes are closed whereas team A members are asked to hide the Bhopla's (Pumpkins) which have the names of the members of team B. Team B members are asked to search their Bhopla's (Pumpkins) and get into the Mhatari's house (Old Lady's house). The one who would reach the Mhatari's house last, will lose that particular round of the task.
Week 5	Result	Mhataricha Bhopla task was cancelled after poor behaviour and physical violence of contestants
Week 5	Punishments	Vishal was nominated for one week for damaging property of Bigg Boss.; Gayatri and Sneha were nominated for one week for physical violence.; **Jail**; Bigg Boss asked the contestants to choose two people for punishment of jail who have broken the majority rules of the house. They all choose Mira and Meenal for the punishment.
Week 5	Captaincy Contenders	Due to the cancellation of the Weekly Task, all the contestants (excluding Vishal, Sneha and Gayatri due to their poor conduct) were qualified for the captaincy task.
Week 5	Captaincy task	**Captain Asa Hava (A Captain should be like this)**; On Day 33, Bigg Boss announced task 'Captain Asa Hava' to assign a new captain. In this each contestant had to give a medal to contestant who they thought were worthy of being the captain. The person with most medals would be the captain in the next week.
Week 5	Result	**Winner (Captaincy) - Santosh with 6 medals**
Week 5	Result	**Lost Captaincy Task - Everyone else**
Week 5	Luxury Budget Task	Bigg Boss announces a luxury budget task from Haier Refrigerator in which, contestants were divided into two teams. Each team will have to find four clues in minimum time. **Team A** – Jay, Sneha, Gayatri, Mira, Utkarsh & Santosh **Team B** – Vishal, Vikas, Meenal, Sonali, Adish & Avishkar
Week 5	Result	**Winner (Luxury Budget Task) - Jay, Sneha, Gayatri, Mira, Utkarsh & Santosh**
Week 5	Result	**Failed (Luxury Budget Task) - Vishhal, Vikas, Meenal, Sonali, Adish and Avishkar**
Week 5	Exits	On Day 35, Adish Vaidya was evicted after facing public votes.
Week 6	Twist	After winning the temptation task, Utkarsh won immunity for next week but had to nominate another contestant for next week's eviction and as a result Vishal was nominated.
Week 6	Nomination	**Swarg Ki Narak (Hell or Heaven)**; On Day 36, Bigg Boss gave the housemates their nomination task. As per the task, Santosh, who is the captain of the house, became the king for the task. Vishal, Sneha, and Gayatri, who were already nominated by Bigg Boss for getting into physical fights and breaking the rules of the house, became advisers of the king. Bigg Boss told contestants to stand in a pair for the nomination task. As per the task rule, the king has to send one contestant to Narak (Hell) and one contestant to the Swarg (Heaven) after consulting with the advisers. The contestants who will be in 'Narak', will get nominated for this week, and those, who will be in 'Swarg', will get safe for this week. In the first round, Bigg Boss asked Jay and Utkarsh as the first pair to stand for the nomination. After learning the sides of the advisers, King decided to send Jay to Narak and Utkarsh to Swarg. In the second round, Bigg Boss asked Vikas and Meenal to stand for the nomination. King sent Vikas in the Narak and Meenal to 'Swarg'. In the third round, Trupti and Sonali stood for the nomination, and King sent Trupti to 'Swarg' and Sonali to the 'Narak'. In the fourth and last round, Bigg Boss asked Mira and Avishkar to stand for the nomination. King sent Aavishkar to 'Narak' and Mira to 'Swarg'. After the task concluded, Jay, Vikas, Sonali and Avishkar were nominated for eviction. Since Vishal, Sneha and Gayatri were punished by Bigg Boss, they were also nominated for eviction.
Week 6	Main task	**Sanyamachi Aaishi Taishi (Like This Of Restraint)**; The contestants played into two teams. Team A had to become 'Rakshas' and Team B had to become 'Devdoot'. contestants, who were Devdoot had to make the tumbling tower, and contestants, who were Rakshas, were assigned to break the tower. The twist in the plot came with the next set of rules. As per that rule, the contestants, who were assigned to be Devdoots, are supposed to have a smiling face throughout the task, even if the Rakshasas break their tumble or their mental status. Who haven't smile on face will be disqualified. **Team A -** Utkarsh, Gayatri, Vikas, Meenal, Santosh & Sneha **Team B** - Vishhal, Jay, Mira, Sonali, Trupti & Avishkar
Week 6	Result	**Winner (Saiyamachi Aaishi Taishi)- Sneha, Gayatri, Sonali & Trupti**
Week 6	Result	**Lost (Saiyamachi Aaishi Taishi) - Everyone else**
Week 6	Captaincy Contenders	Sneha and Trupti
Week 6	Captaincy task	**Aayna Ka Bayna Ghetlya Shivay Jayna**; Bigg Boss asked Sneha and Trupti to choose their samarthaks. Bigg Boss appointed Gayatri and Sonali as the Sanchalak of the task. As per the task rule, Sneha's samarthak had to get the trophies of Trupti after the buzzer, and Trupti's samarthaks had to get the trophies of Sneha. Sneha chose Jay and Vishal as her samarthaks whereas Trupti chose Vikas and Utkarsh as her samarthaks.
Week 6	Temptation task	Bigg Boss asked all housemates to freeze on the place and told them that the first contestant who enters the temptation room, will win the temptation task.
Week 6	Result	**Winner (Captaincy)- Sneha**
Week 6	Result	**Lost (Captaincy)- Trupti**
Week 6	Result	:**Winner (Temptation) - Utkarsh**
Week 6	Result	**Lost (Temptation)- Everyone else**
Week 6	Exits	On Day 42, Avishkar Darwhekar was evicted after facing public votes.
Week 7	Entrances	On Day 42, Neetha Shetty entered the house as the 2nd wild-card contestant.
Week 7	Nomination	**Diwali Nomination Task**; Contestants to perform a Diwali nomination task. As per the new task rule, one contestant has to enter the activity area. There was a toran (crochet) placed in the activity area. All contestants' pictures were placed on the crochet. To nominate a contestant, one contestant had to pick the picture of two contestants from the crochet they wished to nominate and stick those pictures on the whiteboard. Also, they have to swap those contestants with the contestants whose pictures were already on the whiteboard. All contestants needed to nominate two contestants. Contestants whose pictures were on the crochet till the last would be safe from the nomination. On the other hand, contestants whose pictures are on the whiteboard will be nominated for the eviction. As a result Sonali, Meenal, Jay and Trupti were nominated for eviction. Since Utkarsh nominated Vishal after the temptation task, Vishal was also nominated for eviction.
Week 7	Main task	**Dabba Gul**; Contestants were divided into two teams for the task. Meenal was the sanchalak of Team A, and Mira was the sanchalak of Team B. Contestants had to get as many boxes from the activity area when the buzzer rang. Both teams have to wrap up the boxes with ribbon. The two teams also had to protect the boxes from each other. Each team's sanchalak had to approve boxes that were in good condition and disapprove of the damaged boxes. **Team A -** Gayatri, Jay, Meenal, Neetha, Santosh and Utkarsh **Team B** - Trupti, Mira, Sonali, Sneha, Vikas and Vishal
Week 7	Result	**Winner (Dabba Gul) - Sneha, Trupti, Meenal, Neetha, Mira and Gayatri**
Week 7	Result	**Lost (Dabba Gul) - Everyone else**
Week 7	Captaincy candidates task	Bigg Boss welcomed the episode's special guest, famous Indian Singer-Composer Avadhoot Gupte, into the house. Avadhoot asked Dabba Gul task's Team A members Meenal, Neetha, Gayatri, and Team B members Sneha, Trupti, and Mira to stand on the stage. Avadhoot also asked other contestants to stand outside of the stage. Avadhoot later informed the six contestants who were on the stage to eliminate one contestant among them unanimously in each round, and two contestants who would stay till the last round would eventually become the captaincy candidates.
Week 7	Captaincy Contenders	Mira and Gayatri
Week 7	Captaincy task	**Diva Captaincy Cha**; Bigg Boss asked captaincy candidates Mira and Gayatri to get prepared for the task. In the task, the candidates had to cut papers in the shape of Diya and stick them on the Diya, which was already placed in the garden area. Bigg Boss asked Mira and Gayatri to choose one supporter each for three rounds. As per the rule, every round will have a new supporter.
Week 7	Result	**Winner (Captaincy) - Mira**
Week 7	Result	**Lost (Captaincy) - Gayatri**
Week 7	Exits	On Day 49, Trupti Desai was evicted after facing public votes.
Week 8	Twist	Mira being the captain had to decide which contestant will deserve to be in the main house and who outside the main house; Vishal, Vikas, Sonali, Santosh and Jay were selected to go out from the main house. Later she had to choose the contestants who have broken most of the rules of Bigg Boss to stay out of the main house and as a result Utkarsh, Sneha, Jay, Vishal and Vikas were thrown out of the main house.
Week 8	Twist	During the 'Parada Captaincy Cha' task, Sneha and Sonali nominated themselves for next week's eviction in order to make Jay and Vishal win the captaincy task respectively.
Week 8	Twist	During the 'Parada Captaincy Cha' task, Meenal and Utkarsh had to give up the chance of becoming the house-captain for the next two weeks in order to make Vishal and Jay win the captaincy task respectively.
Week 8	Nomination	**Sheras Savvasher**; As per the task, contestants had to stand on the numbers by considering their contributions to household chores, performance during tasks, and overall contribution in 50 days. The contestants also had to discuss with each other and exchange their numbers as per the performance. Mira was immune as she was the house captain. As a result, Vishal, Jay, Utkarsh, Santosh, Neetha, Sonali and Vikas were nominated.
Week 8	Main task	**Japun Danda Dhar**; As per the task, the contestants have to apply stickers of their names on the danda (pillars), and contestants who successfully stick more stickers on the pillars in all the rounds would win the task and compete for the captaincy. Mira was the sanchalak of the task but was also given the right to participate with the other contestants.
Week 8	Result	**Winner (Japun Danda Dhar) - Jay and Vishal**
Week 8	Result	**Lost (Japun Danda Dhar) - Everyone else**
Week 8	Captaincy Contenders	Jay and Vishal
Week 8	Captaincy task	**Parada Captaincy Cha**; The captaincy task is 'Parada captaincy cha'. As per the task, contestants have to sacrifice one of their essential things in the house to make their favorite candidate the captain of the house.
Week 8	Result	**Winner (Captaincy) – Jay**
Week 8	Result	**Lost (Captaincy) – Vishal**
Week 8	Exits	On Day 56, Neetha Shetty was evicted after facing public votes.
Week 9	Twist	After winning the temptation task, Utkarsh won immunity for next week's nomination but had to nominate his partner Mira. He agreed and Mira was nominated for next week's eviction.
Week 9	Nomination	**Mission nomination**; A statue of an alien is placed in the garden area. The alien introduced himself as Tatya and welcomed all the contestants. In the nomination task, Sneha and Sonali could not participate as they had already accepted to get nominated in the task 'Parada Captaincy Cha' in the previous week. Jay also could not participate in the task as he is the captain. Jay was the sanchalak of the task. The remaining contestants had to fight in the nomination task. As per the task, Bigg Boss kept the oxygen cylinders in a box, and contestants, who would get a minimum of three or more cylinders in a round, will be safe from the nomination. Also, the contestant, who does not get any cylinder, will be nominated for eviction. In the first round, six contestants successfully took out cylinders from the box, but Santosh got nominated as he failed to get any cylinder. Five contestants managed to take the cylinders from the box in the second round, except Mira. In the third round, Vishal, Vikas, Meenal, and Utkarsh successfully took the cylinders. Gayatri got nominated after she failed to get any cylinders. In the last round, Utkarsh failed to get any cylinders and was nominated for eviction. At last, Sonali, Sneha, Santosh, Mira, Gayatri and Utkarsh were nominated for eviction.
Week 9	Temptation task	Actors from the Marathi industry, Siddharth Chandekar, Nirmiti Sawant, Kshitee Jog, Hemant Dhome, Sonalee Kulkarni and Mrunmayee Godbole, entered the house by bringing surprising tasks. The guests introduced a surprising task to the contestants. The winning pair will get a chance to enter the temptation room. The guests divided contestants into a pair. Utkarsh - Mira Jagganath, Vikas - Meenal, Jay - Sneha, Vishal - Sonali and Santosh - Gayatri. In the first round, Nirmiti Sawant and Kshitee Jog asked the ten contestants to guess a song from the emojis. Mira -Utkarsh and Gayatri - Santosh's pair guessed more songs and won the first round. Sonalee Kulkarni and Mrunmayee Godble asked the contestants to guess a song or a movie name from the emojis in the second round. Vikas - Meenal and Utkarsh - Mira's pair won the round. The guests later asked the pairs to dance on paper, and both pairs won that task too. Later Sonalee and Mrunmayee decided to judge them by acting and expressions, and they declared Utkarsh - Mira as winners. In the third round, Siddharth Chandekar and Hemant Dhome entered the house. They both asked the final two pairs Mira - Utkarsh, Gayatri - Santosh to fight for a task. In the task, one person from the pair had to blow the air in the balloons. The other had to stick those balloons on the waste. Also, they had to protect their balloons from each other. Gayatri - Santosh won the task. In the fourth round, the two pairs had to write as many autographs on the whiteboard. Utkarsh got successful in writing more autographs. Hence, Utkarsh - Mira's pair got qualified to enter the temptation room. Bigg Boss asked Utkarsh and Mira that only one of them would get a chance to enter the room, and if one of them would accept the temptation, then it would be his benefit, and the other has to face a loss. Utkarsh decided to go into the room. In the temptation room, Bigg Boss asked Utkarsh that he would get safe from eviction for the next week, and Mira would get nominated if he would accept the temptation card. Utkarsh accepted the temptation card, and nominated Mira for eviction for the next week.
Week 9	Result	:**Winner (Temptation) - Utkarsh**
Week 9	Result	**Lost (Temptation)- Everyone else**
Week 9	Main task	Each contestant from one team had to sit on Alien Tatya's chair as per the order of Bigg Boss. As per the task, the contestant who will sit on the chair will not participate, but their three supporters will join the pipe with the available pipe jointers and connect with Tatya's chair. Utkarsh was the sanchalak of the task. Meenal couldn't participate as well after she and Utkarsh gave up their captaincy chances during the 'Parada Captaincy Cha' task. **Team A -** Gayatri, Jay, Mira, and Santosh **Team B** - Sonali, Sneha, Vikas and Vishal
Week 9	Result	Main task was cancelled after poor performance of contestants.
Week 9	Punishment	**Jail**; Bigg Boss asked all contestants to mutually name two contestants whom they think are the reasons why that the main task was cancelled. As a result, Mira and Vishal were sent into the jail.
Week 9	Captaincy candidates task	Since the main task was cancelled after the poor performance of contestants, they had to mutually choose 2 candidates for the captaincy task. Gayatri and Sneha were chosen by housemates to compete for the captaincy position.
Week 9	Captaincy contenders	Gayatri and Sneha
Week 9	Captaincy task	**Ulka Gira Re**; Housemates will try to grab in every round, whoever will manage to grab them first, will choose their favourite contestant for the captain's position.
Week 9	Result	**Winner (Captaincy) – Gayatri**
Week 9	Result	**Lost (Captaincy) – Sneha**
Week 9	Exits	On Day 63, Sneha Wagh was evicted after facing public votes.
Week 10	Twist	Even though Utkarsh won the main task, he couldn't participate in the captaincy task as he decided to give up his captaincy chance. So Mira was given the right to participate in the captaincy task.
Week 10	Nomination	**Nomination express**; As per the task, contestants had tickets of their pictures on the board. All the contestants had to win a race and get a ticket from the board of the contestants they wished to nominate. Later, the contestants had to go to the TC counter and get the ticket approved by the TC. The TC had to decide which ticket they wanted to cut and that contestant would be nominated for eviction. The TC got to nominate just one contestant in a round. Utkarsh is safe from nomination for this week as he won the temptation task last week. Mira was already nominated by Utkarsh after he had to nominate the latter so that he could accept the temptation card. In each round, contestants including Mira and Utkarsh, also could become the TC by winning a race. In the first round, Mira won the TC race. On the other hand, Jay got the ticket of Sonali for nomination. Vishal also got the ticket of Santosh. Jay and Vishal both went to the TC for ticket approval, but TC Mira approved the ticket of Sonali. In the second round, Utkarsh won the race for TC. Jay got the ticket of Vikas. Vishal also got the ticket of Santosh, but TC Utkarsh approved the ticket of Vikas. In the third round, Utkarsh won the TC race. Jay got the ticket of Meenal whereas Vishal also got the ticket of Jay. Utkarsh approved Meenal's ticket. In the fourth round, Meenal won the TC race. Vishal got the ticket of Santosh whereas the latter won the ticket of Jay. TC Meenal approved Santosh's ticket. At the end of the task, Mira, Sonali, Vikas, Meenal and Santosh were nominated for eviction.
Week 10	Main task	For the task, contestants got divided into two teams. **Team A -** Gayatri, Jay, Mira, Santosh and Utkarsh **Team B** - Meenal, Sonali, Vikas and Vishal Despite being the sanchalak, Gayatri was given the right to participate in the task. As per the task, Jay had to play the role of a fish seller from Team A, and Vikas had to play the role of the fish seller from Team B. Other contestants had to be the buyers of fish. The seller who will have more money and the buyer who will have more fish will fight for the captaincy task.
Week 10	Result	**Winner (Main task) – Jay and Utkarsh**
Week 10	Result	**Lost (Main task) – Everyone else**
Week 10	Captaincy contenders	Jay and Mira
Week 10	Captaincy task	For the captaincy task, contestants were divided into two teams. Both the teams had to fight for their team leader who were the captaincy contenders. Gayatri was the sanchalak of the task. As per the task, the teams had to save as much water that would be coming from a tap and keep it securely in a tank. The other team members had to decrease the water level of the opposite team so that their team leader can become the house-captain. **Mira's team -** Mira, Vikas, Santosh and Utkarsh **Jay's team -** Jay, Meenal, Sonali and Vishal
Week 10	Result	**Winner (Captaincy) – Jay**
Week 10	Result	**Lost (Captaincy) – Mira**
Week 10	Luxury Budget task	For the luxury budget task, contestants were divided into two teams. Gayatri was the sanchalak of the task. In the task, the teams had to showcase their talents and skills on the stage. The team who earn more points will win the task. Those who win the task will be able to enjoy a delicious meal sent by Bigg Boss. **Team A -** Jay, Meenal, Utkarsh and Vishal **Team B** - Mira, Santosh, Sonali and Vikas
Week 10	Result	**Winner (Luxury Budget task) – Team A (Jay, Meenal, Utkarsh and Vishal)**
Week 10	Result	**Lost (Luxury Budget task) – Team B (Mira, Santosh, Sonali and Vikas)**
Week 10	Exits	On Day 70, Santosh Choudhari was evicted after facing public votes.
Week 11	Nomination	**Knock-Out**; As per the task, contestants had to rush and get a book of the contestant they wanted to nominate or save. Every book had a contestant's name written on it. Upon the buzzer, contestants giving the books of the contestants they want to nominate to the sanchalak got saved while the rest would get nominated for eviction. The sanchalak had to nominate at least one contestant for eviction in each round. Jay was the sanchalak of the task. In the first round, Vikas, Mira, Vishal, Meenal, Gayatri gave Jay the books of the contestants they did not want to nominate. Sonali, who had a book of Vishal and Utkarsh, who had Sonali's book, did not go to Jay to give their books. Jay nominated Sonali for eviction. In the second round, Meenal and Gayatri did not go to give their books to Jay. Meenal had Gayatri's book while the latter had Vishal's book. Jay nominated Gayatri. In the third round, Utkarsh got the book of Vikas while Vishal Nikam got the book of Mira. Jay nominated Vikas. In the fourth round, Utkarsh got the book of Meenal and the latter got the book of Mira. They both didn't return the books. Jay nominated Meenal. In the fifth round, Meenal got the book of Vishal and Vikas got the book of Utkarsh, but they did not give their books to the sanchalak. Jay nominated Vishal. After the task concluded, Sonali, Gayatri, Vikas, Meenal and Vishal were nominated for eviction.
Week 11	Main task	**Dhar Pakad**; As per the task, a golden-coloured plate will be placed in the center of a square. After every buzzer, two contestants will stand outside the square and try to get the golden plate. Contestants who will get the golden plate more often would be the captaincy contenders.
Week 11	Result	**Winner (Main task) – Meenal and Utkarsh**
Week 11	Result	**Lost (Main task) – Everyone else**
Week 11	Captaincy contenders	Meenal and Utkarsh
Week 11	Captaincy task	As per the captaincy task, contestants had to apply tiles in a given bracket and also had to save them from the opposite team. They had to also destroy those of the opposite team. Other contestants could support any of the two captaincy members.
Week 11	Result	Captaincy task was cancelled after the poor behaviour of contestants.
Week 11	Exits	On Day 77, no eviction took place.
Week 12	Entrances	On Day 78, Adish Vaidya, Sneha Wagh and Trupti Desai re-entered the show as guests for only a few days.
Week 12	Twist	When Adish, Sneha and Trupti entered the house again, they were made the king and queens of the house and had to rule over the other contestants.
Week 12	Nomination	Upon their entrance in the house of Bigg Boss, Adish, Sneha and Trupti were given the right to nominate any contestants among the Top 8. Along nominating them, they had to give a valid reason behind the reason of nominating them. The trio had to nominate the same contestants together in a mutual decision. The contestants were given the dolls of each other. They had to convince Adish, Sneha and Trupti to nominate the person's whose doll is with them. In each round, the trio had to throw out a doll through the main door which would have eventually nominate the holder. In the first round, the trio nominated Sonali and threw her doll out of the house. In the second round, the trio nominated Gayatri and threw her doll out of the house. The trio threw Mira's doll out of the house in the third round. Then in the fourth round, Utkarsh was nominated by the trio. In the fifth round, Jay was nominated by the trio. At the end of the nomination task, Sonali, Gayatri, Mira, Utkarsh and Jay were nominated for eviction.
Week 12	Main task	**Hukumshaha**; To perform the task, Bigg Boss transformed the house in Liliputnagar, and Adish, Sneha and Trupti had to become the 'Hukumshaha' and the housemates to become the Praja. Hukumshahas of the Liliputnagar, the trio had to act like dominating hukumshahas, and the housemates had to follow all instructions of the trio. If any housemate did not follow the instructions, the Hukumshaha also had a right to punish them. After the task concluded, Bigg Boss called Vikas, Sonali, Utkarsh and Mira in the confession room and assigned them four different tasks stating if they get succeeded in performing all four tasks, they will too become eligible for the captaincy as the other four contestants won the main task.
Week 12	Result	**Winner (Main task) – All housemates**
Week 12	Captaincy contenders	All housemates
Week 12	Captaincy task	**Jo Jeeta Wohi Sikander**; As per the task, one contestant who won the main task and the other one who lost but was given another chance by Bigg Boss will play against each other. One person will have to protect the ball and another opponent will have to destroy it. At last, two contestants will remain whereas the rest will be out of the task. The two remaining people have to choose their supporters for the task. Meenal and Vishal remained in the game at last making them the two last contestants fighting for the captaincy position. **Meenal's supporter -** Jay **Vishal's supporter** - Sonali
Week 12	Result	**Winner (Captaincy) – Meenal**
Week 12	Result	**Lost (Captaincy) – Everyone else**
Week 12	Exits	On Day 83, Adish Vaidya, Sneha Wagh and Trupti Desai left the house after they completed their duration as guests.
Week 12	Exits	On Day 83, Gayatri Datar was evicted after facing public votes.
Week 13	Twist	**Winning Amount Distribution**; As per the task, housemates had to distribute the winning amount of 25 lakhs among themselves. Bigg Boss gave 7 plates to the contestants. On each plate, the distributed amount was mentioned in bold. The seven plates had amounts of 12,50,000, 6,00,000, 3,25,000, 1,50,000, 1,00,000, 50,000, 25000. Housemates had to distribute the amount in time or the winning amount would become zero. Vishal got the amount plate of 12,50,000, Meenal got 6,00,000, Vikas got 3,25,000, Jay got 1,50,000, Utkarsh got 1,00,000, Sonali got 50,000 and Mira got 25,000. Later, Bigg Boss announced, if a contestant gets nominated for eviction then the amount assigned to him/her would be deducted from the final prize money. Mira was nominated, and Rs. 25000 got reduced from the prize money and Rs. 50000 got reduced when Sonali got nominated. Utkarsh was nominated and hence Rs. 1,00,000 got reduced. Vikas got nominated, and Rs. 3,50,000 was reduced from the prize money again. Towards the end, a total amount of Rs. 5,00,000 got reduced from final prize money.
Week 13	Twist	After Team B was qualified for the Ticket To Finale task, they had the option to choose whether to let Meenal participate in the task or disqualify her. As a result, Meenal was rejected to participate in the Ticket To Finale task.
Week 13	Nomination	**Birthday Bomb**; As per the nomination task, the house-captain Meenal had to nominate someone for eviction. That person would then get the birthday bomb/power to nominate someone else and the pattern will continue. Meenal got a birthday bomb, and she nominated Mira. Mira nominated Sonali who in turn nominated Utkarsh and passed the bomb to him. Utkarsh nominated Vikas and the nomination task ended. At the end of the task, Mira, Sonali, Utkarsh and Vikas were nominated for eviction.
Week 13	Ticket To Finale Candidates task	For the task, contestants were divided into two teams. Meenal was the sanchalak of the task. **Team A -** Jay, Sonali and Vikas **Team B** - Mira, Utkarsh and Vishal Team A had to choose one representative from their team who would show the mirror to Team B and remind them how inadequately they have played in the show so far. Team B had also had to choose one representative from their team who would show the mirror to Team A and would tell them about how poor their game was.
Week 13	Result	**Winner (Ticket To Finale Candidates task) – Team B (Mira, Utkarsh and Vishal)**
Week 13	Result	**Lost (Ticket To Finale Candidates task) – Team A (Jay, Sonali and Vikas)**
Week 13	Ticket To Finale Contenders	Mira, Utkarsh and Vishal
Week 13	Ticket To Finale task	As per the task, the contenders had to sit on the chair and count 33 minutes to concentrate. Other contestants had to distract them by using their own techniques. They have to play the bell after calculating 33 minutes, and one contestant who will be the closest or count exact minute would be the first finalist to win the Ticket To Finale and go directly to the finale. On top of that, none of them had a clock in front of them, and they had to count the minutes using their strategies.
Week 13	Result	**Winner (Ticket To Finale task) – Vishal**
Week 13	Result	**Lost (Ticket To Finale task) – Mira and Utkarsh**
Week 13	Exits	On Day 91, Sonali Patil was evicted after facing public votes.
**Week 14**; **Finale Week**	Entrances	On Day 97, Akshay Waghmare, Surekha Kudachi, Adish Vaidya, Avishkar Darwhekar, Trupti Desai, Neetha Shetty, Sneha Wagh, Santosh Choudhari, Gayatri Datar, Sonali Patil and Mira Jagganath re-entered the house as guests for only the **Grand Finale**.
**Week 14**; **Finale Week**	Twist	For the first time in the history of Bigg Boss Marathi 3, a mid-week eviction took place on Day 95 after which only the Top 5 contestants advanced to the Grand Finale of the show.
**Week 14**; **Finale Week**	Twist	On the Grand Finale, the Top 5 finalists were given a suitcase containing 5 lakhs and they had the choice to walk out of the show with the sum. Nobody agreed to the proposal thus the sum was given to nobody.
**Week 14**; **Finale Week**	Nomination	Everyone was nominated for the mid-week eviction except Vishal as he won the Ticket To Finale.
**Week 14**; **Finale Week**	Exits	On Day 95, Mira Jagganath was evicted after facing public votes.
**Week 14**; **Finale Week**	Exits	On Day 98, Akshay Waghmare, Surekha Kudachi, Adish Vaidya, Avishkar Darwhekar, Trupti Desai, Neetha Shetty, Sneha Wagh, Santosh Choudhari, Gayatri Datar, Sonali Patil and Mira Jagganath left after the **Grand Finale.**
**Week 14**; **Finale Week**	Grand Finale Day 98	
**Week 14**; **Finale Week**	4th Runner Up	**Meenal Shah**
**Week 14**; **Finale Week**	3rd Runner Up	**Utkarsh Shinde**
**Week 14**; **Finale Week**	2nd Runner Up	**Vikas Patil**
**Week 14**; **Finale Week**	1st Runner Up	**Jay Dudhane**
**Week 14**; **Finale Week**	Winner	**Vishal Nikam**

== Guest appearances ==
=== Through direct contact ===
Week(s)	Day(s)	Guest(s)	Purpose of visit	Ref.
Week 1	Day 00	Siddharth Jadhav	To Co-host the show	
Week 1	Day 00	Adarsh Shinde	To support his brother Utkarsh	
Week 4	Day 25	Akshaya Iyer	Dussehra Special	
Week 4	Day 25	Vishwajeet Borvankar	Dussehra Special	
Week 4	Day 28	Shiv Thakare	For special task	
Week 4	Day 28	Neha Shitole	For special task	
Week 5	Day 35	Megha Dhade	For special task	
Week 5	Day 35	Resham Tipnis	For special task	
Week 6	Day 46	Avadhoot Gupte	For captaincy task	
Week 6	Day 49	Yogita Chavan	Bhaubeej Special	
Week 6	Day 49	Saorabh Choughule	Bhaubeej Special	
Week 7	Day 56	Nitya Pawar (Krishnappa)	Children's Day Special	
Week 7	Day 56	Somnaath	Children's Day Special	
Week 7	Day 58	Sonalee Kulkarni	To promote film Jhimma	
Week 7	Day 58	Mrinmayee Godbole	To promote film Jhimma	
Week 7	Day 58	Nirmiti Sawant	To promote film Jhimma	
Week 7	Day 58	Kshitee Jog	To promote film Jhimma	
Week 7	Day 58	Siddharth Chandekar	To promote film Jhimma	
Week 7	Day 58	Hemant Dhome	To promote film Jhimma	
Week 10	Day 70	Aayush Sharma	To promote film Antim: The Final Truth	
Week 10	Day 70	Mahima Makwana	To promote film Antim: The Final Truth	
Week 11	Day 76	Subodh Bhave	To promote film Vijeta	
Week 11	Day 76	Pooja Sawant	To promote film Vijeta	
Week 11	Day 76	Maadhav Deochake	To promote film Vijeta	
Week 11	Day 76	Sushant Shelar	To promote film Vijeta	
Week 12	Day 78-83	Adish Vaidya	To perform special tasks	
Week 12	Day 78-83	Sneha Wagh	To perform special tasks	
Week 12	Day 78-83	Trupti Desai	To perform special tasks	
Week 12	Day 83	Siddharth Jadhav	To Co-host the show	
Week 13	Day 89	Amey Wagh	To carry out Ticket To Finale task and promote film Zombivli	
Week 13	Day 89	Vaidehi Parshurami	To carry out Ticket To Finale task and promote film Zombivli	
Week 13	Day 89	Lalit Prabhakar	To carry out Ticket To Finale task and promote film Zombivli	
Week 13	Day 91	Ankush Chaudhari	To promote film Luckdown Be Positive	
Week 14	Day 97-98	Ex-Housemates except Shivlila Patil	To meet Top 5 finalists	
Week 14	Day 98	Bhargavi Chirmule	To promote show Aai - Mayecha Kavach	
Week 14	Day 98	Anushka Pimputkar	To promote show Aai - Mayecha Kavach	
Week 14	Day 98	Shiv Thakare	To carry out eviction	
Week 14	Day 98	Chhaya Kadam	To promote film Nay Varanbhat Loncha Kon Nay Koncha	
Week 14	Day 98	Prem Dharmadhikari	To promote film Nay Varanbhat Loncha Kon Nay Koncha	
Week 14	Day 98	Varad Nagwekar	To promote film Nay Varanbhat Loncha Kon Nay Koncha	
Week 14	Day 98	Hitesh Modak	To interact with the Top 5 finalists	
Week 14	Day 98	Anupama Takmoge	To promote show Tujhya Rupacha Chandana	
Week 14	Day 98	Tanvi Shewale	To promote show Tujhya Rupacha Chandana	
Week 14	Day 98	Rohit Chandra	To promote show Tujhya Rupacha Chandana	
Week 14	Day 98	Sushant Shelar	To promote show Tujhya Rupacha Chandana	

=== Through video conferencing ===
Week(s)	Day(s)	Guest(s)	Purpose of visit	Ref.
Week 1	Day 00	Anand Shinde	To support his son Utkarsh
Week 10	Day 70	Salman Khan	To talk to Top 9 contestants
Week 14	Day 96	RJ Bandya	For special task
Week 14	Day 96	RJ Shonali	For special task
Week 14	Day 96	RJ Shruti	For special task
Week 14	Day 96	RJ Smita	For special task

== Nominations table ==
	Week 1	Week 2	Week 3	Week 4	Week 5	Week 6	Week 7	Week 8	Week 9	Week 10	Week 11	Week 12	Week 13	Week 14			
	Week 1	Week 2	Week 3	Week 4	Week 5	Week 6	Week 7	Week 8	Week 9	Week 10	Week 11	Week 12	Week 13	Day 95	Day 98		
Nominees for Captaincy	Not eligible	Mira; Utkarsh	Jay; Gayatri	Jay; Vishal	Sneha; Vishal; Surekha	Adish; Avishkar; Jay; Mira; Meenal; Santosh; Sonali; Trupti; Utkarsh; Vikas	Sneha; Trupti	Gayatri; Mira	Jay; Vishal	Gayatri; Sneha	Jay; ~~Utkarsh~~; Mira	Utkarsh; Meenal	Gayatri; Jay; Meenal; Mira; Sonali; Utkarsh; Vikas; Vishal	No; Captain			
House Captain	No; Captain	Utkarsh	No; Captain		Trupti	Santosh	Sneha	Mira	Jay	Gayatri	Jay	No; Captain	Meenal	No; Captain			
Captain's Nominations	No; Captain	Avishkar; Meenal; Shivlila; Sonali; Surekha (To evict)	No; Captain		Not eligible	Avishkar; Jay; Sonali; Vikas (To evict)	Gayatri; Meenal; Mira; Vikas (To evict)	Not eligible	Not eligible	Not eligible	Gayatri; Meenal; Sonali; Vikas; Vishal	No; Captain	Mira (To evict)	No; Captain			
Notes					4						11						
Vote to	Save/Evict	Evict			Save	Evict		Task		Evict		Evict		None	WIN		
Vishal	Sonali (to save); Trupti (to evict)	Sneha; Mira; Gayatri; Jay	Akshay	Not eligible	Not eligible	Nominated	Nominated	Nominated	Safe	Santosh	Nominated	Not eligible	Not eligible	Finalist	No; Nominations	Winner (Day 98)	
Jay	Gayatri (to save); Shivlila (to evict)	Avishkar; Meenal; Shivlila; Vikas; Vishal	Vishal	Trupti; Sneha; Vishal; Vikas; Santosh	Utkarsh; Gayatri	Nominated	Nominated	Nominated	House; Captain	Sonali; Vikas; Meenal	House; Captain		Not eligible	Nominated	No; Nominations	1st runner-up (Day 98)	
	Surekha (to save); Mira (to evict)	Sneha; Mira; Gayatri; Jay	Not eligible	Not eligible	Not eligible	Nominated	Safe	Nominated	Safe	Not eligible	Nominated		Not eligible	Nominated	No; Nominations	2nd runner-up (Day 98)	
Utkarsh	Surekha (to save); Sneha (to evict)	House; Captain	Not eligible	Sneha; Vishal; Vikas; Santosh	Jay; Mira	Safe	Safe	Nominated	Nominated	Vikas; Meenal	Safe	Not eligible	Vikas	Nominated	No; Nominations	3rd runner-up (Day 98)	
Meenal	Jay (to save); Avishkar (to evict)	Gayatri; Jay; Sneha; Mira	Not eligible	Nominated	Sonali; Vishal	Safe	Nominated	Safe	Safe	Santosh	Nominated	Not eligible	House; Captain	Nominated	No; Nominations	4th runner-up (Day 98)	
Mira	Jay (to save); Vikas (to evict)	Avishkar; Meenal; Shivlila; Vikas; Vishal	Not eligible	Trupti; Sneha; Vishal; Vikas; Santosh	Not eligible	Safe	Safe	House; Captain	Nominated	Sonali	Safe	Not eligible	Sonali	No; Nominations	Evicted (Day 95)		
Sonali	Akshay (to save); Utkarsh (to evict)	Avishkar; Meenal; Shivlila; Gayatri; Jay	Trupti	Nominated	Not eligible	Nominated	Nominated	Nominated	Nominated	Not eligible	Nominated	Not eligible	Utkarsh	Evicted (Day 91)			
Gayatri	Jay (to save); Santosh (to evict)	Avishkar; Meenal; Shivlila; Vikas; Vishal	Not eligible	Trupti; Sneha; Vishal; Vikas; Santosh	Not eligible	Nominated	Safe	Safe	Nominated	House; Captain	Nominated	Not eligible	Evicted (Day 84)				
Santosh	Shivlila (to save); Gayatri (to evict)	Avishkar; Meenal; Shivlila; Vikas; Vishal	Sneha	Not eligible	Sneha	House; Captain	Safe	Nominated	Nominated	Not eligible	Evicted (Day 70)						
Sneha	Santosh (to save); Utkarsh (to evict)	Avishkar; Meenal; Shivlila; Vikas; Vishal	Not eligible	Trupti	Not eligible	Nominated	House; Captain	Safe	Nominated	Evicted (Day 63)		Sonali; Gayatri; Mira; Utkarsh; Jay					
Neetha	Not In House						Safe	Nominated	Evicted (Day 56)								
Trupti	Jay (to save); Vishal (to evict)	Avishkar; Meenal; Shivlila; Vikas; Vishal	Not eligible	Not eligible	House; Captain	Safe	Nominated	Evicted (Day 49)				Sonali; Gayatri; Mira; Utkarsh; Jay					
Avishkar	Mira (to save); Meenal (to evict)	Gayatri; Jay; Sneha; Mira	Not eligible	Not eligible	Not eligible	Nominated	Evicted (Day 42)										
Adish	Not In House			Safe	Avishkar	Evicted (Day 35)						Sonali; Gayatri; Mira; Utkarsh; Jay					
Surekha	Vishal (to save); Utkarsh (to evict)	Avishkar; Meenal; Shivlila; Gayatri; Jay	Santosh	Nominated	Evicted (Day 28)												
Akshay	Trupti (to save); Shivlila (to evict)	Avishkar; Meenal; Shivlila; Sonali; Surekha	Not eligible	Evicted (Day 21)													
Shivlila	Utkarsh (to save); Santosh (to evict)	Gayatri; Jay; Sneha; Mira	Walked (Day 10)														
Notes	1	2,3		4	5,6		7,8		9	10		12		13			
Against Public Vote	Utkarsh; Shivlila; Santosh; Vishal; Gayatri; Vikas; Sneha; Avishkar; Meenal; Trupti; Mira	Jay; Gayatri; Vishal; Vikas; Avishkar; Meenal; Shivlila	Akshay; Santosh; Trupti; Vishal; Sneha; Surekha	Trupti; Santosh; Vikas; Vishal; Sneha; Surekha; Meenal; Sonali	~~Santosh~~; Vikas; Meenal; Adish	Gayatri; Vishal; ~~Sneha~~; Jay; Vikas; Sonali; Avishkar	Vishal; Jay; Trupti; Sonali; Meenal	~~Jay~~; Neetha; Santosh; Sonali; Utkarsh; Vikas; Vishal	Sneha; Sonali; Mira; Utkarsh; ~~Gayatri~~; Santosh	Mira; Sonali; Vikas; Meenal; Santosh	Sonali; Gayatri; Vikas; Meenal; Vishal	Sonali; Gayatri; Mira; Utkarsh; Jay	Mira; Sonali; Utkarsh; Vikas	Jay; Meenal; Mira; Utkarsh; Vikas	Jay; Meenal; Utkarsh; Vikas; Vishal		
Walked	None	Shivlila	None														
Evicted	No; Eviction		Akshay	Surekha	Adish	Avishkar	Trupti	Neetha	Sneha	Santosh	No; Eviction	Gayatri	Sonali	Mira	Meenal	Utkarsh	
Evicted	No; Eviction		Akshay	Surekha	Adish	Avishkar	Trupti	Neetha	Sneha	Santosh	No; Eviction	Gayatri	Sonali	Mira	Vikas	Jay	Vishal

=== Notes ===
indicates the House Captain.
indicates the Nominees for house captaincy.
indicates that the Housemate was directly nominated for eviction prior to the regular nominations process.
indicates that the housemate has Ejected.
indicates that the housemate has Re-Entered.
indicates that the Housemate was granted immunity from nominations.
indicates the contestant has been evicted.
indicates that the contestant was just a guest entrant.
indicates the contestant has been walked out of the show.
indicates a new wildcard contestant.
indicates the winner.
indicates the first runner up.
indicates the second runner up.
indicates the third runner up.
indicates the fourth runner up.

- ^Note 1: Housemates had to save one housemate and nominate one housemate of the opposite gender only.
- ^Note 2: Housemates were divided into pairs for this week. Each pair had to nominate two pairs.
- ^Note 3: Shivlila left the house due to medical treatment but later she revealed that she won't coming back by sending a video as her condition became worse.
- ^Note 4: After Surekha was evicted, she was given the power to choose the captain for the next week and hence Trupti became the captain.
- ^Note 5: Housemates had to perform a task where they had to get diamonds from a basket and the first one to get the diamond would get to save one other housemate from nomination.
- ^Note 6: Sneha, Gayatri, and Vishal were nominated due to their poor behaviour, violence and damaging Bigg Boss property.
- ^Note 7: Wildcard contestants were safe from one week's nomination and eviction.
- ^Note 8: Utkarsh won immunity after winning the Temptation task and Vishal was already nominated by Utkarsh beforehand after he also won the power to nominate one contestant.
- ^Note 9: In order to make their favorite captaincy candidate win, Sneha and Sonali nominated themselves to make Jay and Vishal the captain respectively.
- ^Note 10: Utkarsh gained immunity after winning the Temptation task and to claim that immunity power, he had to nominate Mira. He agreed and Mira was nominated for eviction.
- ^Note 11: Utkarsh won the main task and was selected to fight for the captaincy position but he voluntarily refused and thus was replaced by Mira.
- ^Note 12: Adish, Sneha and Trupti re-entered the house and had to carry out the tasks including nomination where the trio had to nominate several contestants in a mutual decision. They were also the king and queens for that week.
- ^Note 13: For the first time in the history of Bigg Boss Marathi, a mid-week eviction was held after which only the Top 5 contestants would reach the finale.
