= Sher-e-Punjab: Maharaja Ranjit Singh =

Indian historical drama television series

- Also known as: Maharaja Ranjit Singh
- Genre: Historical fiction
- Created by: Abhimanyu Singh; Rupali Singh
- Directed by: Prasad govandi Arif Ali Ansari; Gautam nagrath Arif shamsi
- Creative directors: Nitish Ranjan, Mona Ahuja
- Opening theme: "Sher-e-Punjab: Maharaja Ranjit Singh" by Sonu Nigam
- Composer: Raju Singh
- Country of origin: India
- Original language: Hindi
- No. of seasons: 1
- No. of episodes: 90

Production
- Producers: Abhimanyu Singh; Rupali Singh
- Production locations: Amgaon; Maharashtra; Rajasthan
- Editor: K. Rajgopal
- Camera setup: Multi-camera
- Running time: 20-22 minutes
- Production company: Contiloe Entertainment

Original release
- Network: Life OK
- Release: March 20 – July 21, 2017

Related
- Maharaja Ranjit Singh

Sher-e-Punjab: Maharaja Ranjit Singh (English: Lion of Punjab: King Ranjit Singh) is an Indian historical drama based on the life of Maharaja Ranjit Singh (1780 –1839), the founder of the Sikh Empire, which ruled the northwest Indian subcontinent in the early half of the 19th century. The series stars Damanpreet Singh, Tunisha Sharma, Shaleen Bhanot, Rumi Khan, Sonia Singh, Sneha Wagh and Chetan Pandit.

The series premiered on Life OK on 20 March 2017.

== Plot summary ==
On 13 November 1780, Maharaja Ranjit Singh, who united Punjab under one flag, was born. Played by Damanpreet Singh, Maharaja Ranjit Singh not only conquered territories, but won the hearts of the people of Punjab. He led not by fear and brute power, but with compassion and humanity. The series showcases Maharaja Ranjit Singh's life journey and his dedication to serving and protecting his motherland.

== Cast ==
=== Main ===
- Damanpreet Singh as Maharaja Ranjit Singh
- Shaleen Bhanot as Maha Singh Sukerchakia, Leader of the Sukerchakia Misl (1770 –1792)
- Sneha Wagh as Raj Kaur, Wife of Maha Singh and mother of Ranjit Singh
- Tunisha Sharma as Mehtab Kaur, The only child of Gurbaksh Singh and Sada Kaur and First wife of Ranjit Singh
- Sonia Singh as Sada Kaur, Mother of Mehtab Kaur and chief of the Kanhaiya Misl from 1789 to 1821

=== Recurring ===
- Chetan Pandit as Jai Singh Kanhaiya, Founder and leader of the Kanhaiya Misl
- Rumi Khan as Gurbaksh Singh Kanhaiya, The only son and heir of Jai Singh Kanhaiya
- Mukesh Tripathi as Nidhan Singh, Gurbaksh Singh kanhaiya's Step brother
- Siddharth Vasudev as Sahib Singh Bhangi, Leader of the Bhangi Misl
- Parvati Sehgal as Roop Kaur, Wife of Sahib Singh and sister of Maha Singh
- Sparsh Srivastav as Gulab Singh, Son of Sahib Singh and Roop Kaur
- Anuradha Patel as Mai Vajero, Nursemaid of Ranjit Singh
- Hasan Zaidi as Abdullah Khan, Chief of the Chattha tribe
- Syed Aman Mian Sharma as Fakir Azizuddin, Physician, linguist, diplomat, and foreign minister at the court of Raṇjīt Siṅgh
- Akashdeep Saigal as Peer Muhammad
- Vimarsh Roshan as Lakpat Rai, Maha Singh's chief minister

== Production ==
"He always looked up to everyone equally and ruled fairly. The beauty about his time was that he kept all enemies away and created ‘akhand’ (United) Punjab," Abhimanyu Singh, CEO, Contiloe Pictures, speaking about the great Sikh ruler, Maharaja Ranjit Singh.

=== Conception ===
"I like making shows based on history. Maharaja Ranjit Singh is my fourth venture after the success of Jhansi Ki Rani. This show is purely a passion-driven, rather than a profit-driven venture. It promises to be the biggest historical out of our stable. We have worked for over a year and a half with a 500-man unit working day and night to translate our vision into reality. We are also working with state-of-the-art VFX supervisors and stylists to give freshness to this epic saga," said the producer as well as creative head of the show, Abhimanyu Singh.

"This show is very much different to the ones I've made before. I have made many shows based on History like Chandra Nandni and Jodha Akbar. This show will be the biggest I have made" said the producer behind this show, Karan Chaggar.

The series premiered on 20 March 2017, shortly after the hotly-contested Uttar Pradesh Legislative Assembly elections concluded in India. "This series is very contextual in today's political scenario", observed Abhimanyu Singh. "Today, all politicians want to rule for power and have their own intent and agenda. Here we have Maharaja Ranjit Singh who actually ruled with sewa bhav which is a great teaching of Sikhism. Also the Sikhs were in minority in Punjab then yet he was able to administer the region, expand it from Afghanistan to present day Sutlej, from Kashmir to Balochistan. All this became possible because of his inclusive policy, patience, passion, dedication and great administrative set-up." He felt the show would make electors realise to choose those who can govern well while inspiring the elected to be serious about governance.

=== Casting ===
Contiloe went through extensive auditions to find an actor appropriate to play the titular role of Ranjit Singh and finally chose Punjab-based 14-year-old actor Damanpreet Singh. Abhimanyu Singh said, "We chose Damanpreet Singh for playing the role of Maharaja Ranjit Singh after we were done with more than 150 auditions. His simplicity and innocence charmed us entirely. The other actors are Tunisha Sharma playing the role of Ranjit Singh's wife, Mehtab Kaur, Shaleen Bhanot as Ranjit Singh's father, Maha Singh, Sneha Wagh as Ranjit Singh's mother, Raj Kaur, Sonia Singh as Mehtab's mother, Sada Kaur and Rumi Khan as Mehtab's father, Gurbaksh."

On bagging the lead role, Damanpreet said, "I have read about Maharaja Ranjit Singh ji in school. I am in ninth class right now. It's an honour for me to portray him on national television." Damanpreet has been trained in horse-riding, sword-fighting and martial arts for the role. He has also undergone special training with body language experts to mimic the movements of those who are impaired in one eye since Ranjit Singh lost sight in his left eye in his youth.

Arhaan Behl was the first choice to play the role of Ranjit Singh's father, Maha Singh, but when he could not take it up, it went to Eijaz Khan, who opted out for unknown reasons. Saurabh Raaj Jain was too approached to play the role but couldn't take up the project due to his busy schedule. Said a source associated with the project, "Arhaan was always the original choice for the role, but he couldn't take up the offer back then because of date issues. We then approached Eijaz, who was quite excited about playing the part, but the deal didn't materialise. We are elated to have Arhaan on board as he fits the bill perfectly. Rohit Khurana was approached for Gurbaksh Singh's role but declined it for unknown reasons."

The role ultimately went to Shaleen Bhanot. Being a non-Sikh and Punjabi, Shaleen was in a cultural shock when the creative team of the show approached him. He researched for a period of six months to make sure his depiction of Maha Singh is impeccable. "I had to hire a Punjabi teacher which was another task living in Mumbai. For nine days I didn’t step out of my home. I watched Punjabi movies and listened to Punjabi folk music. Now I think I am quite good at it," Shaleen said.

In February 2017, it was reported that Siddharth Vasudev had been cast to play the negative role of Sahib Singh Bhangi, the brother-in-law of Maha Singh and the leader of the Bhangi Misl. Child actor Syed Aman Mian Sharma, who is currently in trend due to his character Balu in Sony Entertainment Television's historical drama Peshwa Bajirao, was chosen to play the pivotal role of a young Azizuddin in the series. The actor was said to be working in both projects simultaneously.

=== Historical accuracy ===
Keeping in mind the sentiments of the Sikh community, Abhimanyu Singh stated that they had done a lot of research for the show. "We have followed Khushwant Singh's books. We have also followed instructions of Dr. J. S. Grewal and Gurbaksh Singh, who are prominent historians", said Abhimanyu Singh. A team of four including historian Dr. J. S. Grewal and author Dr. Gurbaksh Singh have gone through the screenplay thoroughly. "During shooting of important sequences they are present at the sets", he added. Historians and weaponry experts worked with the production team for a period of 12 months prior to the release of the show.

=== Sets ===
The series was shot across various locations in Rajasthan and Maharashtra, the sets were designed by Bollywood director, production and designer Omung Kumar, who is renowned for his esque cinematography in films like Black, Saawariya and Yuvvraj. In order to do justice to the grandeur of the royal Punjab courts, Kumar created a lavish set for the show in Amgaon near the Maharashtra-Gujarat border.

=== Costumes ===
Noted Bollywood costume designer duo, Rushi Sharma and Manoshi Nath, who have tailored for films like PK, Queen, Kick, Dhoom 3 etc. have been roped in to clothe Ranjit Singh (Damanpreet Singh), his first wife Mehtab Kaur (Tunisha Sharma), father Maha Singh (Shaleen Bhanot), mother Raj Kaur (Sneha Wagh), father-in-law Gurbaksh Singh (Rumi Khan) and mother-in-law Sada Kaur (Sonia Singh). Said the duo, "We researched the era, Sikhism and the Maharaja himself, the fabrics and jewellery they wore then. We also incorporated the pan-Asian and middle-Asian influence on art and handlooms. We have given a particular colour for every character. For Ranjit, it's mostly white, for the antagonists its darker colours like emerald green, ruby red and midnight blue. Also, each character has a specific kind of jewellery."

=== Action sequences ===
Contiloe have roped in Bollywood stunt director Allan Amin to design the war sequences in the show, which have been shot in various places in India. In February 2017, Allan said, "I am designing the action sequences for the show. We have already shot the opening war sequence. When audiences will watch the sequence on their TV screens, they will feel like they are watching a movie. The makers of the show have supported me extensively and have given me the liberty to shoot these action sequences my way." Contiloe were keen on giving the show a movie-like feel, and hence decided to hire the services of the celebrated stuntman.

=== Music ===
The title track of the series has been crooned by Sonu Nigam. He says he felt empowered by the number and the lyrics. "The song I sang for the show is the title track for the show ‘Sher-e-Punjab Maharaja Ranjit Singh’ by the same name, music by my dearest friend and super talented composer Raju Singh and written by Kumaar. I felt empowered by the song and the lyrics and I'm sure even the listeners will feel the power we felt in creating this song," said Sonu.

== Reception ==
Anvita Singh of The Times of India criticized the series upon its release. "Maharaja Ranjit Singh's fights, and the set, and even the way the story has been told is not engaging at all." She further added, "The actors do what is required of them. Well, most of them, Akashdeep Saigal being an exception. The actor portrays Pir Muhammad, and considering the number of negative roles he has done in the past, one would have thought that Akashdeep would have been great at his job. But he is not. From the accent, to the way he carries himself; everything seems off about him. He does not spell dangerous or fearsome." She concluded her review by saying that, "Shaleen Bhanot, who plays Maha Singh, Maharaja Ranjit Singh's father, is the only one who makes the show somewhat bearable."

== See also ==
- Maharaja Ranjit Singh
