= Desan Kaur =

Sikh regent

Sardarni of the Sukerchakia Misl
- Tenure: 1756 – 1770
- Predecessor: Lali Kaur
- Successor: Raj Kaur

Regent of Sukerchakia Misl
- Regency: c. 1770 – 1780
- Misldar: Maha Singh
- Born: 1740; Gujranwala, Sikh Confederacy (present-day Punjab, Pakistan)
- Died: 1794 (aged 53–54); Gujranwala, Sikh Confederacy (present-day Punjab, Pakistan)
- Spouse: Charat Singh (m. 1756)
- Issue: Mahan Singh; Sahej Singh; Raj Kaur; Saher Kaur
- House: Warraich (by birth); Sandhawalia (by marriage)
- Father: Sardar Amir Singh Waraich
- Religion: Sikhism

Sardarni Desan Kaur Waraich (1740 – 1794), also known as Mai Desan, was the regent of the Sukerchakia Misl during the minority of her son from 1770. She was the wife of Sardar Charat Singh and the mother of Sardar Maha Singh. Her grandson, Maharaja Ranjit Singh, was the founder of the Sikh Empire.

== Early life and marriage ==
Bibi Desan Kaur Waraich was born to Sardar Amir Singh Waraich possibly in the year 1740. Sardar Amir Singh, was a very old Sikh Chieftain of Gujranwala, belonging to the Waraich Jat Clan. She had two elder brothers Dal Singh and Gurbaksh Singh, and a sister.

In 1756 she married Sardar Charat Singh of the Sukerchakia Misl. The couple had four children two sons, Mahan Singh also known as Maha Singh, and Sahej Singh followed by two daughters, Bibi Raj Kaur (not to be confused with the wife of Mahan Singh) and Saher Kaur.

Sardarni Desan Kaur administered the Sukerchakia Misl since her husband was mostly away to battle.

== Regent of Sukerchakia Misl ==
In 1770, her spouse died and was succeeded by her son, who was a minor. Mai Desan Kaur assumed the leadership of the Sukerchakia Misl as Mahan Singh was too young to run his affairs. Desan Kaur was an able administrator, her people prospered and were happy under her rule. She was courageous and had tact and ability. One of the first tasks she undertook was the rebuilding of the fort at Gujranwala which had been destroyed by Ahmad Shah Durrani in 1751-1752. She renamed the new fort Mahan Singh ki Garhi.

She formed a political alliance with Sardar Jai Singh Kanhaiya of the Kanhaiya Misl. She arranged for her son Maha Singh to be married to Man Kaur, daughter of Sardar Jai Singh Mann of Mogalchak-Mananwala and Raj Kaur, daughter of Raja Gajpat Singh of Jind; she became popularly known as Mai Malwain. Desan Kaur married her daughter, Raj Kaur to Sahib Singh, the son of Gujar Singh of the Bhangi Misl. Her youngest daughter was married to Sohel Singh. By setting up these alliances she ensured the sympathies of the Phulkians and the Bhangis (who were jealous of the growing fame of her late husband); these matrimonial alliances helped consolidate her power.

== In popular culture ==
Simmi Sekhon portrays Desan Kaur in the 2010 historical TV series Maharaja Ranjit Singh telecasted on DD National.
