= Raj Kaur =

Rajmata of Sikh Empire (1758–1803)

- Rajmata of Sikh Empire; Mai Malwain Sahiba

Rani of Sukerchakia Misl
- Tenure: 1774–1792
- Predecessor: Desan Kaur
- Successor: Mehtab Kaur; Datar Kaur

Regent of the Sukerchakia Misl
- Misldar: Ranjit Singh
- Born: c. 1758; Badrukhan, Phulkian Misl, Sikh Confederacy (present-day Punjab, India)
- Died: 1803; Lahore, Sikh Empire (present-day Punjab, Pakistan)
- Spouse: Maha Singh (m. 1774)
- Issue: Ranjit Singh
- House: Phulkian (by birth); Sukerchakia (by marriage)
- Father: Raja Gajpat Singh
- Mother: Rani Gajpat Kaur, daughter Kishan Singh Manshahia
- Religion: Sikhism

Rani Raj Kaur was the wife of Maha Singh, the leader of the Sukerchakia Misl and the mother of Maharaja Ranjit Singh, the founder of the Sikh Empire. She was affectionately known as Mai Malwain after her marriage. She is also referred to as Sardarni Raj Kaur and Rajkumari Bibiji Raj Kaur Sahiba before marriage. She was the daughter of Raja Gajpat Singh of Jind of the Phulkians.

== Family and marriage ==
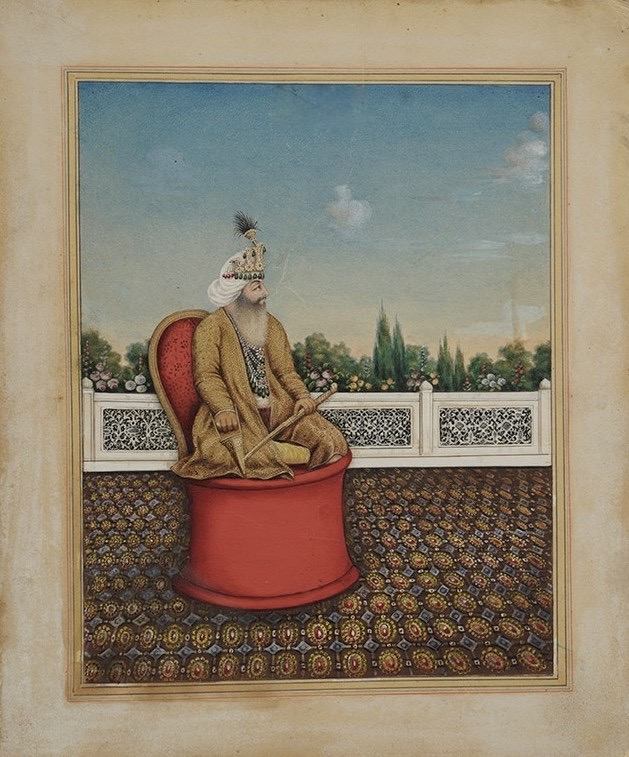
Miniature painting of Raja Gajpat Singh, founder of Jind State and father of Raj Kaur

Raj Kaur was born to the family of Sidhu Phulkians of Mehraj, one of the oldest aristocratic Sikh families in Malwa. She was the granddaughter of Sukhchain Singh and his wife, Rani Agam Kaur. In 1743, Agam Kaur was imprisoned in Delhi by the Mughal imperial forces alongside her 5 year old son, Gajpat Singh until her husband Sukhchain Singh halts his rebellion and pays tribute to the Mughal Empire. However due to a faithful maid of Agam Kaur, who switched places with her in prison she was able to escape back to Punjab with her son.

By 1754, Gajpat Singh had expanded his territory and took the title of Raja. He was married to a daughter of Kishan Singh Manshahia and she was known as Rani Gajpat Kaur.

Raj Kaur was titled Rajkumari Bibiji at birth and she had three elder brothers, Tikka Yuvraj Mehar Singh, Raja Bagh Singh, who succeeded their father as the King of Jind in 1789 and Kanwar Bhup Singh who was granted Badrukhan, Baman Bade, and Bazidpur as his hereditary jagirs in 1789 by his brother. She also had a younger half sister, Rajkumari Bibiji Bagam Kaur who was born in 1765 to Gajpat Singh's junior wife known as Balanwali Rani.

In 1774, at the age of fifteen, Raj Kaur was married to the 17-year-old Maha Singh, son of Charat Singh, leader of the Sukerchakia Misl and his wife, Sardarni Desan Kaur. The marriage was set by Maha Singh's mother and it strengthened his position amongst the Sikh rulers of the time.

Six years after their marriage, Raj Kaur gave birth to Maha Singh's only son on 2 November 1780. He was named Buddh Singh at birth, but was later renamed Ranjit Singh. The birth of a son was celebrated with alms-giving, feeding of the poor, and giving rich offerings to temples and shrines. Maha Singh did not have time to devote to his son's upbringing, nor did the conventions of the time give opportunity to Raj Kaur, confined as she was to the seclusion of the zenana (a practice which the Sikh ruling classes had taken from the Muslims) to see much of her son after he was old enough to be on his own.

== Regent to Ranjit Singh ==
During the siege of Sodhra, which was being occupied by the Bhangi Misl, Maha Singh contracted dysentery and died in April 1790. Ranjit Singh was 9-years-old at the time of his father's death in 1790. Raj Kaur became Ranjit's regent during his minority and managed the affairs of the Sukerchakia Misl. She was assisted by Diwan Lakhpat Rai (as decided by Maha Singh prior to his death) who is reputed to have acted with ability and enthusiasm. Maha Singh also entrusted Missar Laiq Ram with the treasury and he was adjure to aid Raj Kaur and Ranjit Singh.

The teenage Ranjit Singh took hardly any interest in the affairs of the state, making Raj Kaur anxious for his future. She felt that marriage might bring him around to the responsibilities of life. Ranjit had been betrothed (in Maha Singh's lifetime) to Mehtab Kaur, the only daughter of Sada Kaur and granddaughter of Jai Singh Kanhaiya, the chief of the powerful Kanhaiya Misl. Mai Malwain approached Sada Kaur to fix the nuptial date and Ranjit was fifteen years old when he left Gujranwala for Batala, the chief town of the Kanhaiyas, for his muklawa to Mehtab Kaur in 1796, the marriage took place in 1789. This alliance between the two important Sikh families was a major event for Punjab. All the leading Sikh royals and aristocrats were present at the wedding.

As young Ranjit Singh was content with Lakhpat Rai administrate his estates much to the chargain of his mother-in-law, Sada Kaur who found an ally in Sardar Dal Singh of Akalgarh, who was the maternal uncle of Maha Singh. Dal Singh aided his sister Desan Kaur after the death of her husband, Charat Singh hence he felt that Maha Singh should have appointed him regent to Ranjit Singh and resented the influence and power of Raj Kaur and Lakhpat Rai. Faqir Syed Waheeduddin, descendant of Fakir Azizuddin, a courtier of Ranjit Singh, in his book The Real Ranjit Singh claimed that Sada Kaur and Dal Singh began poisoning young Ranjit Singh' mind against his mother, but all in vain. Such courtly intrigues made Ranjit Singh spend most of his days hunting and away from home. During one such hunting trip an attempt was made on his life by Hashmat Khan, uncle of Ghulam Chatta who was defeated by Maha Singh in battle planned to avenge his nephew by assassinating a 13 year old Ranjit Singh. Before the assailant could Ranjit Singh stricked him with his sword.

Mai Malwain also oversaw Ranjit's nuptials with Raj Kaur Nakai, daughter of Sardar Ran Singh Nakai in 1797, perhaps as a check on the ambitious of Sada Kaur. Ranjit Singh readily agreed to a second marriage as his marriage with Mehtab Kaur was hardly pleasant, with her not forgiving the fact that her father, Gurbaksh Singh Kanhaiya died in a battle against Maha Singh and she resented being married to Maha Singh's son. After halting the invasion of Zaman Shah Durrani in 1797 at 16, Ranjit Singh now started to take control of the matters of his estate hence wanted to consolidate his power by marrying the sister of the Nakai chief, Sardar Gyan Singh. Ranjit Singh was betrothed to the Nakai princess when he was merely 4 years old and she was just a suckling infant. The alliance was fixed by Maha Singh and Ran Singh Nakai's widow, Karmo Kaur. His second marriage brought him a strategic military alliance just like his first wedding. His second marriage was celebrated with great show and pomp. His new wife was known as Raj Kaur Nakai, she was renamed as Datar Kaur after her marriage but was affectionately spoken of as Mai Nakain and remained the most loved and respected queen of Ranjit Singh.

Shortly after his second marriage, Lakhpat Rai was murdered while collecting revenue at Katasraj by an assassin sent by Chatta Tribal chiefs, old foes of the Sukherchakias. Dal Singh and Sada Kaur are said to have played a role in his death as after his death Dal Singh asked Missar Laiq Ram to hand over the treasury to him while Sada Kaur gave him money and sent him to Haridwar. This is why in 1801, Ranjit Singh imprisoned Dal Singh and strips him of his territories and Sada Kaur too was sidelined especially after Datar Kaur gave birth to his heir, Kharak Singh. Eventually in 1820s, Sada Kaur too was imprisoned and her territories were also confiscated.

A year later Lakhpat Rai's death, Raj Kaur too died due to poisoning.

Unwilling to be controlled anymore at 17, Ranjit Singh took control of his administration.

== In popular culture ==
- Raj Kaur was a portrayed by Tasreen in the TV series titled Maharaja Ranjit Singh which aired on DD National. The series was produced by Raj Babbar.
- Raj Kaur was portrayed by Sneha Wagh in Life OK's historical drama Sher-e-Punjab: Maharaja Ranjit Singh.

== See also ==
- Maha Singh
- Ranjit Singh
