= Moin Nawaz Warraich =

Member of the Provincial Assembly of the Punjab
- In office 29 May 2013 – 31 May 2018
- Constituency: PP-109 (Gujrat-II)

Personal details
- Born: 22 February 1949 (age 77) Gujrat, Punjab, Pakistan
- Party: Pakistan Muslim League (Nawaz)

Moin Nawaz Warraich (Urdu: معین نواز وڑائچ; born 22 February 1949) is a Pakistani politician and retired military officer who was a member of the Provincial Assembly of the Punjab from May 2013 to May 2018.

== Early life and education ==
Warraich was born on 22 February 1949 in Gujrat to Gul Nawaz Warraich. He graduated from Pakistan Military Academy in 1970.

== Military career ==
Warraich is a Pakistan Army officer and has served as a Major until his retirement in 1995.

== Political career ==
Warraich ran for the seat of the Provincial Assembly of the Punjab as a candidate of Pakistan Peoples Party from Constituency PP-109 (Gujrat) in the 2002 Pakistani general election but was unsuccessful.

Warraich was elected to the Provincial Assembly of the Punjab as a candidate of Pakistan Muslim League (Nawaz) from Constituency PP-109 (Gujrat-II) in the 2013 Pakistani general election.
