= Trupti Desai =

Indian activist for women's rights (born 1985)

- Born: 12 December 1985 (age 40); Nipani, Karnataka, Indian
- Occupation: Social activist
- Known for: Founder the Bhumata Brigade & Bhumata Foundation
- Television: Bigg Boss Marathi 3 (2021)
- Political party: Indian National Congress (2012)
- Spouse: Prashant Desai (m. 2006)
- Children: 1

Trupti Desai (born 1985) is an Indian social activist and the founder of the Bhumata Brigade & Bhumata Foundation, a Pune-based organization. Desai has campaigned for allowing women to religious places like the Shani Shingnapur Temple, the Haji Ali Dargah, the Mahalakshmi Temple, and the Trimbakeshwar Shiva Temple, all in Maharashtra, and most recently the Sabarimala temple in Kerala. In 2012, she was an Indian National Congress candidate for the Pune Municipal Corporation elections. In 2021, she participated in Bigg Boss Marathi 3 as a contestant and evicted on Day 49.

== Personal life ==
Desai was born in Nipani taluka in the Indian state of Karnataka on 12 December 1985. Her father left the family for an ashram and she was raised with her two siblings by her mother.

Desai has been married since 2006 and has one son. Her husband Prashant claims that she is "extremely spiritual" and is follower of Gagangiri Maharaj of Kolhapur.

== Activities ==
In 2003, Desai was a social worker with Krantiveer Jhopdi Vikas Sangh to help rehabilitate slum dwellers. From 2007 to 2009, Desai staged protests against the financial irregularities at the Ajit Cooperative Bank involving a fraud of ₹50 crore (US$5.3 million). In January 2009, she led a group against then deputy Chief Minister of Maharashtra Ajit Pawar. An arrest warrant was issued against her in 2013 for heading the group that allegedly "slapped the effigy of Pawar, used abusive language and held an illegal agitation despite prohibitory orders". Desai was immediately released on bail, claiming that the arrest was just a tactic to stop activists from protesting. She founded the Bhumata Brigade on 27 September 2010. Since its founding, the brigade has grown from 400 to 5,000 registered members as of January 2016. In 2011, she also participated in the anti-corruption movement. She contested the 2012 elections for the Pune Municipal Corporation from Balaji Nagar ward as a member of Indian National Congress; but lost.

=== Religious places ===
In November 2015, a woman entered the Hindu shrine of Shani Shingnapur Temple, where women were not allowed. The priests of the temple suspended the security guard on duty at the time and carried out a cleansing ceremony of the idol. This agitated Desai, who along with other members of her brigade staged various forced entries into the shrine. The state government and the district level court of Pune directed the temple officials to allow women in the shrine based on their constitutional rights. On 8 April 2016, the day celebrated as Gudi Padwa—the new year day of the Maharashtrian calendar—Desai along with other female members of the Brigade entered the shrine of Shani Shingnapur Temple.

Post Shingnapur entry, Desai reached the Mahalakshmi Temple in Kolhapur where the temple management committee allowed her entry but the priests became violent against her. Five priests were arrested for attacking Desai and the protestors. She also entered the inner sanctum of the Trimbakeshwar Shiva Temple near Nashik where she was peacefully escorted by the police, but only with wet clothes similar to how the temple allows men.

In April 2016, she made an attempt to enter the Haji Ali Dargah in Mumbai; however, an angry mob made it unsuccessful. Desai claimed that she received a death threat if she again tried to enter the dargah—a type of Islamic shrine. On 12 May 2016, she made a second attempt and entered the mosque under tight security but not in the inner sanctum where women are not allowed.

In November 2018, she made an unsuccessful attempt to visit the Sabarimala temple in Kerala during the Mandalam-Makaravilakk pilgrim season. The temple had legal as well as religious restrictions that prevented the entry of women of menstruating age (approx. 10–50 years) since 1991 which was overturned through a verdict by the Supreme Court of India in October 2018. Even though a dozen women of menstruating age had attempted to visit the temple after the verdict came, all of them proved unsuccessful largely due to protests. Desai was also blocked by protesters at Cochin International Airport on 16 November 2018, while on her journey to Sabarimala. She decided to return after getting stranded inside the airport for more than 14 hours and vowed to come back again. She did not.

== Reality Shows ==
Year	Name	Role	Notes
2021	Bigg Boss Marathi 3	Contestant	Evicted; Day 49
