= Maharaja Ranjit Singh (TV series) =

Indian historical drama television series

- Genre: Historical drama
- Created by: Raj Babbar
- Story by: Sardar Basra
- Directed by: Chitraarth; Sikander Bharti
- Starring: Ejlal Ali Khan; Rajendra Gupta; Shahbaz Khan; Jaspal Singh Sehgal; Simmi Sekhon; Rishikesh Sharma; Dr. Ranjit Sharma; Neeta Mohindra; Hardeep Gill Ahmad Harhash
- Music by: Jagjit Singh
- Country of origin: India
- Original languages: Hindi; Punjabi
- No. of seasons: 1
- No. of episodes: 56

Production
- Executive producer: Dr. Daljit Singh
- Producers: Nadira Babbar; Kukoo Babbar
- Production location: Patiala
- Production company: Babbar Films Private Limited

Original release
- Network: DD National
- Release: 13 April 2010 – 3 May 2011

Related
- Sher-e-Punjab: Maharaja Ranjit Singh

Maharaja Ranjit Singh is an Indian historical drama television series created by Raj Babbar. It was directed by Chitraarth and Sikander Bharti and produced by Nadira Babbar and Kukoo Babbar of Babbar Films Private Limited. The drama aired on DD National from 13 April 2010 to 3 May 2011. The series is based on the life of 19th-cntury Sikh ruler Ranjit Singh and covers the part of history of Punjab from 1739 to 1812. The show comprised 56 episodes. The music was composed by Jagjit Singh. Filming was done between 2004–2010.

== Cast ==
- Ejlal Ali Khan as Ranjit Singh
- Neeta Mohindra as Sada Kaur
- Shahbaz Khan as Jassa Singh Ahluwalia
- Jaspal Sehgal as Charat Singh
- Simmi Sekhon as Desan Kaur
- Jitinder Khaira as Maha Singh
- Tasreen as Raj Kaur
- Navneet Cheema as Maharani Datar Kaur
- Dr. Ranjit Sharma as Kaura Mal
- Rajendra Gupta as Adina Beg Khan
- Rishikesh Sharma as Muhammad Shah
- Chetan Batra as Ahmad Shah Durrani
- Shaikh Sami as Zakariya Khan Bahadur
- Rajveer Bawa as Massa Ranghar
- Davinder Daman as Fateh Miyan
- Hardeep Gill as Mohkam Chand
- Surjit Dhami as Dal Singh
- Gurcharan Arora as Jodh Singh Ramgarhia
- Sandeep Singh as Hari Singh Bhangi
- Amandeep Singh as Bhai Gurdit Singh
- Anita Devgan as Mato (Maharani Mehtab Kaur's maid)
- Vibha Bhagat as Guddo (Ranjit Singh's proclaimed sister)
- Ahmad Harhash as Yuvraj Malhotra (Guddo's sister)

== See also ==
- Dal Khalsa (Sikh army)
- Sikh Misls
- Sikh Empire
