= Vishal Nikam =

Indian television actor

Vishhal Nikam
- Born: 10 February 1994 (age 32); Sangli, Maharashtra, India
- Occupation: Actor
- Years active: 2018–present
- Known for: Bigg Boss Marathi 3
- Spouse: Akshaya Hindalkar (m. 2026)

Vishal Nikam (born 10 February 1994) is an Indian television actor known for participating and winning the Bigg Boss Marathi 3. He debut from Star Pravah's Saata Jalmachya Gathi.

== Personal life ==
Nikam was in relationship with his girlfriend Soundarya but they broke up in 2022 after four years of relationship. In 2026, he married Akshaya Hindalkar. It was later revealed that Akshaya was, in fact, Soundarya.

== Career ==
Vishal started his career with the Marathi movie Mithun in 2018. In the next year, he featured in another Marathi movie Dhumas. In the same year, he got the lead role in Star Pravah's Saata Jalmachya Gathi. In 2020, he portrayed the role of Jotiba in Dakkhancha Raja Jotiba.

In 2021, he was cast in the role of Shiva Kashid in Jay Bhawani Jay Shivaji serial. In the same year, he participated and won the Bigg Boss Marathi 3. In 2023, he played a role in Colors Marathi's Aai Mayech Kavach.

Currently, he is shooting for his upcoming movie Vedat Marathe Veer Daudle Saat.

== Filmography ==
Key
†	Denotes films that have not yet been released

=== Films ===
Year	Title	Role	Ref.
2018	Mithun	Mithun	
2019	Dhumas	Tejsingh	
2023	Baloch		
TBA	Vedat Marathe Veer Daudle Saat †	Chandraji Kothar	

=== Television ===
Year	Title	Role	Channel	Ref.
2019	Saata Jalmachya Gathi	Yuvraj Khanvilkar	Star Pravah	
2020	Dakkhancha Raja Jotiba	Jyotiba	Star Pravah	
2021	Jay Bhawani Jay Shivaji	Shiva Kashid	Star Pravah	
2021	Bigg Boss Marathi 3	Contestant	Colors Marathi	
2022-2023	Aai Mayech Kavach	Maansingh	Colors Marathi	
2022	Bigg Boss Marathi 4	Guest contestant	Colors Marathi	
2024	Yed Lagla Premach	Raya	Star Pravah	

=== Music videos ===
Year	Title	Singer	Ref.
2022	Pandharichya Panduranga	Pravin Kuwar	
2022	Tu Sang Mere	Harshavardhan Wavre	
2023	Rang Bhare	Harshavardhan Wavre	
2024	Shivbacha Naav	Adarsh Shinde & Sonali Sonawane	
