= Bhumata Brigade =

Indian social activist organisation

The Bhumata Brigade is a Pune-based social activist organization founded in 2010 in the state of Maharashtra, India, dedicated to fighting against injustice to women and against corruption. The organization's founder is Indian gender equality activist Trupti Desai.

The Bhumata Brigade is best known for their protests against the banning of women from worship at places of worship, including Shani Shingnapur temple in Ahmednagar, Maharashtra, and the Haji Ali Dargah in Mumbai, Maharashtra.

By 2016, the Bhumata Brigade reportedly had 4,000 members, including some men. A branch of the organization Bhumata Ranragani Brigade, focuses on women's causes, including the Shani temple protests. They are also sought out for assistance by victims of eve teasing, dowry issues, and physical or sexual assault.

Other protests include: high prices of onions and other vegetables; exploitation of farmers and farmer suicides; the rape of a child in Mumbai; the Lokpal bill agitations with Anna Hazare; and more.

Bhumata Brigade is not aligned with any political parties in India. Desai has stood for election.

== See also ==
- Gulabi Gang
- Red Brigade Lucknow
