= Sneha Wagh =

Indian television actress

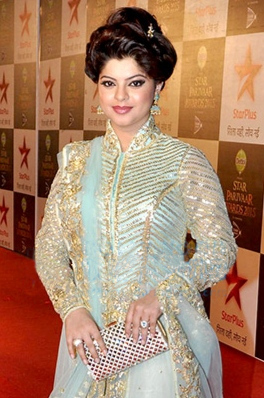
- Sneha in 2015
- Born: 4 October 1987 (age 38); Kalyan, Maharashtra
- Occupation: Actress
- Years active: 2007–present
- Known for: Jyoti; Ek Veer Ki Ardaas...Veera; Bigg Boss Marathi 3
- Spouses: Avishkar Darwhekar (m. 2007, divorced); Anurag Solanki (m. 2015; div. 2016)

Sneha Wagh (born 4 October 1987) is an Indian actress who works in Hindi television. She is best known for her role as Jyoti in Imagine TV's drama series Jyoti and for her role in Star Plus's drama series Ek Veer Ki Ardaas...Veera. In 2021, she participated in Marathi reality show Bigg Boss Marathi Season 3.

== Early life ==
Wagh did her graduation in Bachelor of Science and has done filmmaking course from London Film Academy and is a film director.

== Career ==
Sneha started her career at the age of 13 in Marathi theatre. Her first television show was Adhuri Ek Kahani where she played the role of Arpita on Zee Marathi. She went on star in a Marathi serial titled Kaata Rute Kunala where she played the lead role. With more Marathi shows like Adhuri Ek Kahani she had gained much popularity within the regional audiences. She made her Hindi television debut with Imagine TV's show Jyoti, where she played the lead role of Jyoti. She played the role of Ratanjeet Sampooran Singh in Ek Veer Ki Ardaas...Veera on Star Plus. In 2021, she participated in Bigg Boss Marathi 3.

Since January 2026, she played Vidya in Colors TV's Mahadev & Sons.

== Filmography ==
=== Television ===
| Year | Serial | Role | Notes |
|---|---|---|---|
| 2007–2008 | Adhuri Ek Kahani | Arpita Deodhar | |
| 2007–2009 | Kaata Rute Kunala | Chandana | |
| 2009–2010 | Jyoti | Jyoti Kabir Sisodia | |
| 2011–2012 | Dholkichya Talavar | Contestant | |
| 2012–2015 | Ek Veer Ki Ardaas...Veera | Ratanjeet "Ratan" Sampooran Singh | |
| 2017 | Sher-e-Punjab: Maharaja Ranjit Singh | Maharani Raj Kaur | |
| 2018 | Chandrashekhar | Jagrani Seetaram Tiwari | |
| 2018 | Bitti Business Wali | Bitti's Mother | |
| 2018 | Mere Sai – Shraddha Aur Saburi | Tulsi | |
| 2018–2019 | Chandragupta Maurya | Maharani Moora | |
| 2020 | Kahat Hanuman Jai Shri Ram | Maharani Añjanā | |
| 2021 | Bigg Boss Marathi (season 3) | Contestant (Evicted on Day 63) | 10th place |
| 2022 | Jai Hanuman – Sankatmochan Naam Tiharo | Maharani Añjanā | |
| 2022–2023 | Na Umra Ki Seema Ho | Amba "Ami" Mehta | |
| 2023 | Neerja – Ek Nayi Pehchaan | Pratima | |
| 2024–2025 | Chhathi Maiyya Ki Bitiya | Goddess Devi Chhathi Maiyya | |
| 2026–present | Mahadev & Sons | Vidya Bajpai Mahadev | |

=== Films ===
| Year | Films | Role |
|---|---|---|
| 2025 | The Taj Story | Sushmita Das |

== See also ==
- List of Hindi television actresses
- List of Indian television actresses
