= Baloch (film) =

2023 Marathi film

- Theatrical release poster
- Directed by: Prakash Pawar
- Written by: Prakash Pawar
- Produced by: Mahesh Karwande; Jeevan Jadhav; Ganesh Shinde; Datta Kale; Jitesh More; Santosh Bhongale; Nemaran Choudhary; Bablu Jhende; Ganesh Kharpude; Dnyanesh Gaikwad
- Starring: Pravin Tarde; Ashok Samarth; Tejashree Jadhav; Smita Gondkar; Rohit Awale; Vishal Nikam
- Cinematography: Mayur Hardas
- Edited by: Akshay Salwe; Mayur Hardas
- Music by: Songs: Narendra Bhide; Mohit Kulkarni; Score: Mohit Kulkarni
- Production companies: Vishwagunj Pictures; Kirti Wadkar Films; Amol Laxman Kangane Studio
- Distributed by: Filmastra Studios
- Release date: 5 May 2023
- Country: India
- Language: Marathi
- Budget: ₹3 crore
- Box office: ₹2.57 crore

Baloch is a 2023 Indian Marathi-language historical drama film written and directed by Prakash Pawar, starring Pravin Tarde, Ashok Samarth, Tejashree Jadhav, Smita Gondkar, and Vishal Nikam in the leading roles. The film is based on the historical events after the Battle of Panipat, about the struggles of Marathas as laborers after their transfer to Balochistan.

The film was theatrically released on 5 May 2023, film received positive reviews from critics for acting performances of Pravin Tarde, Ashok Samarth and Smita Gondkar. Baloch grossed over ₹2.57 crore at the box office.

== Plot ==
The story of the Baloch film is based on the events following the Third Battle of Panipat in 1761, in which the Marathas suffered a devastating defeat at the hands of the invading forces of the Durrani Empire. The film throws light on the struggles and challenges faced by the Marathas during that time and is based on the outcome of the battle and its aftermath.

== Cast ==
- Pravin Tarde as Suryaji
- Ashok Samarth as Jafar Khan
- Ramesh Pardeshi as Sadashiv Bhau Peshwe
- Tejashree Jadhav
- Smita Gondkar as Ratna
- Rohit Awale
- Vishal Nikam

== Release ==
=== Theatrical ===
The film was theatrically released on 5 May 2023.

== Reception ==
=== Critical reception ===
Anub George of The Times of India rated 2.0 out of 5, praised Pravin Tarde's acting said "Tarde dons the role of Subhedar Saryaji and makes a larger than life impression", and criticised poorly executed sound design in the film. Devendra Jadhav of Sakal praised performances of Tarde and Ashok Samarth in negative role, music of Narendra Bhide. Virat Verma from Flickonclick gave 4 out of 5 stars and wrote "The film is the perfect tribute to the braveness and valour of Marathas who fought in the battle of Panipat. The movie is a fine drama that makes you emotional with its grim tone." OTT Marathi rated 4 stars out of 5 and gave positive review.

=== Box office ===
The film grossed over ₹2.57 crore at the box office.

== Soundtrack ==
Track listing
No.	Title	Lyrics	Singer (s)	Length
1.	"Samsher"	Pravin Joshi	Kailash Kher	4:02
2.	"Tu Wagh Hay"	Pranit Kulkarni	Avdhoot Gupte, Adarsh Shinde	3:24
3.	"Khulya Jivala"	Guru Thakur	Shreya Ghoshal	2:39
