= Farrukh Shahbaz Warraich =

Pakistani journalist

- Born: 12 February 1993 (age 33); Lahore, Punjab, Pakistan
- Education: University of the Punjab, Lahore, Punjab
- Occupations: Content Producer, Researcher, Columnist, Editor, President of PFUC
- Employer(s): PTV News, Lahore
- Website: http://farrukhshahbaz.com/

Farrukh Shahbaz Warraich (Urdu: فرخ شہباز وڑائچ) born 12 February 1993, Lahore) is a Pakistani journalist, Urdu columnist and political analyst.^{[1]} He is an associate with Urdu Point. He was associate with PTV News as Content Producer & Researcher. His column appears regularly in Daily Nai Baat. He has earlier worked with leading Urdu newspapers. Starting his journalistic career as a freelancer while still being a student and since then he has written number of analytic columns on current political issues and domestic politics of Pakistan.

== Birth and education ==
Farrukh Shahbaz Warraich was born in Lahore, Punjab on February 12, 1980. He belongs to a Punjabi speaking Warraich family of Southern Punjab. His hometown is Layyah District, Punjab. In 1995, Farrukh passed matriculation examination from Ravian Foundation Grammar School. In 1997, he passed the exams of Intermediate from Government Science College Lahore. In 1998, he got Graduation Degree from University of the Punjab, Lahore.

Later he also did Masters in Mass Communication from University of the Punjab, Lahore.

== Career as columnist ==
As columnist, Farrukh wrote many articles for different newspapers. He worked with different Print Media Groups of Pakistan like Royal Media Group, Jehan Pakistan Media Group. He also wrote features for Monthly Hikayat Magazine, Weekly Family Magazine, and Weekly Nai Baat Magazine.

He started his career as Columnist from Daily Din Newspaper in 2012. In 2013, he wrote articles for Jehan Pakistan Newspaper till 2015. Currently, His column appears regularly in Daily Nai Baat from January 2016. His online article can be read on Hamari Web.

== Editor of Paigham Digest, Arqam and Zauq International ==
Farrukh was associated with Monthly Paigham digest as Editor also he is Incharge of Kids Edition of Daily As-Sharq, along with these He is President of PFUC (Pakistan Federal Union of Columnists). 40th Special Issue of Paigham Digest has been issued in the Editorship of Farrukh.

Along with these, Farrukh is Administrator Editor of Quarterly magazine Zauq International and Quarterly magazine of Monthly Arqam. He writes his famous Column "Nawai-e-Haq" for Daily Nawai-e-Waqt Newspaper.

== Chairman of PFUC ==
On May 24, 2018, Farrukh was elected chairman of Pakistan Federal Union of Columnists (PFUC) for 2018–2019 in elections held recently.

Farrukh is one of the founding members of PFUC and he was President of Pakistan Federal Union of Columnists (PFUC) .

== Geo News ==
He is an associate with PTV News as Content Producer & Researcher.

== Other activities ==
Farrukh is fellow in Mass Communication in University of the Punjab, Lahore, and he is most active in different activities in that department. On Friday December 11, 2015, he elected Founder-President of PU-ICS, Punjab University's Institute of Communication Studies. On January 20, 2016, he and his friends celebrated the 143rd birthday of Maulana Zafar Ali Khan in Maulana Zafar Ali Khan's Library of that department.

== Award ==
Farrukh was awarded by renowned Columnist and Chief Editor of Daily Pakistan Newspaper Mr. Mujib-ur-Rehman Shami in Annually Workshop of PFUC.
