= Singnapur =

- Census town
- Location in Maharashtra, India
- Coordinates: 19.917°N 74.5091°E
- Country: India
- State: Maharashtra
- District: Ahilyanagar

Population (2001)
  - Total: 10,858

Languages
  - Official: Marathi
- Time zone: UTC+5:30 (IST)

Singnapur is a census town in Ahilyanagar district in the Indian state of Maharashtra.

== Demographics ==
As of 2001 India census, Singnapur had a population of 10,858. Males constitute 55% of the population and females 45%. Singnapur has an average literacy rate of 68%, higher than the national average of 59.5%: male literacy is 76%, and female literacy is 58%. In Singnapur, 34% of the population is under 6 years of age.

== Temple of Shanidev ==
The place is mainly known for the temple of Shanidev located there. Daily thousands of the people visit the temple. The number of people increases in the festivals and weekends. The temple is famous around the nation. People offer edible oil, mala, black cloth and Leaves of banyan tree, coconut to the temple. It is believed that bad time (Panoti) of a man having "Panoti" ends by worshiping the god Shanidev. Jay Shanidev.
