= Jyoti (TV series) =

- Created by: Sphere Origins
- Written by: Purnendu Shekhar; Rajesh Dubey; Gajra Kottary; Paushali Ganguli; Shobhit Jaiswal
- Directed by: Siddharth Sengupta, Jignesh Vishnav, Aziz Khan, Ramesh Pandey
- Creative directors: Richa Singh Gautam & Nimisha Pandey
- Starring: See Below
- Opening theme: "Jyoti" by Pamela Jain
- Country of origin: India
- Original language: Hindi
- No. of episodes: 511

Production
- Producers: Sunjoy Waddhwa; Comall Sunjoy W.
- Production location: Udaipur
- Cinematography: Sanjay K Memane; Anil Katke
- Running time: 24 minutes
- Production company: Sphere Origins

Original release
- Network: Imagine TV
- Release: 16 February 2009 – 27 November 2010

Jyoti (transl. Light) is an Indian television series that was aired on Imagine TV, produced by Sphere Origins. It started airing on 16 February 2009, and concluded on 27 November 2010.

The series is based on a real-life incident of a person close to the writer Purnendu Shekhar.

== Plot ==
Jyoti tells the story of the eldest daughter of her family — the only person working and sacrificing her own dreams and ambitions to fulfill others. She do two jobs simultaneously one is in Shishumangal Anathalaya and the other in Kathak Dance Academy as a Dance teacher.

When she finally finds her Prince Charming Brij, it turns out he has an affair with her younger sister Sushma. When Jyoti is finally getting back on her feet, fate intrudes again and it turns out that Sushma and Sandeep is not her real siblings.

She falls in love with a rich blind man, Pankaj and marries him. But fate intrudes for the third time and turns out that her other real sister Sudha has a double personality disorder : She is soft-spoken Sudha at home and party girl Devika at night. Sudha is helped through this by a psychologist Kalpana who is also a friend of Jyoti. After this Sudha falls in love with Pankaj’s cousin brother Uday and they secretly marry, resulting in Pankaj's Choti Maa blaming Jyoti for all the problems in the house. Soon Jyoti finds out that Sushma is having problems living with Brij, he gets drunk and abuses Sushma. This problem is solved by Jyoti returning a pregnant Sushma to her parents' house.

This makes everyone think that Brij is going to keep his distance but he doesn't and he is back. He makes up a new plan to hurt Jyoti by becoming friends with Pankaj. Soon Sushma and Sandeep make a plan to arrest the Brij by police. Jyoti tells Pankaj all about her sister Sushma and Brij. This results in Pankaj throwing Jyoti out of the house; little does he know that Jyoti is pregnant. He learns about this later on but still doesn't want anything to do with Jyoti; he files for a divorce with the reason being that he believes that he is not the father to Jyoti's unborn child.Pankaj is still seeing Jyoti but isn't forgiving her. He has said I will say nothing about what has happened if you do, but still he doesn't want to get back with Jyoti. Jyoti and Pankaj don't get divorced.

Finally after sometime Jyoti is now divorced. She meets a man, Kabir, whom she works with in dance Academy. Her family is not happy with their relationship after a few weeks, as her divorce has only happened. They go everywhere, causing chaos to the Sharma family. When Kabir makes it up to the Sharma family, he is allowed to hang around with Jyoti. Kabir meets Brij who now has advanced stage Tuberculosis. Kabir makes Brij straight as he wants Sushma and his baby back. They wed in a big celebration. On the day of the wedding, Kabir proposes to Jyoti — she says a lot of things to him but doesn't say yes. Sushma and Brij are very happy and hoping that their baby is due soon so that they can live a very happy life. One day after the wedding, Kabir and Jyoti see that someone is about to rob Pankaj's money and shoot him. Kabir jumps in front of Pankaj and takes the bullet. He is fine, but Jyoti is now having regrets about saying all those things to Kabir. Jyoti has realised that she loves Kabir and will marry him, much to the chagrin of Pankaj who wants Jyoti and his child back. Jyoti goes to meet Pankaj, and she soon finds out that he wants the baby. He says that he isn't going to let her go until she has the baby (so he can take it). Jyoti tries to escape but, as she reaches the stairs, Pankaj grabs her. Jyoti tries getting away but ends up falling down the stairs. She is badly injured. Pankaj takes her to a hospital, where the doctor tells him that they can only save one person: the baby or Jyoti.

Kabir and Sandeep go to the police to report that Jyoti is missing. Pankaj decides the baby should to survive. Luckily for Jyoti, she has an operation and both live. Later, Sandeep and Kabir visit the hospital. They see Jyoti, and the doctor announces that there is bad news. The baby is dead...

Pankaj told the doctor to say the baby is dead when actually he took the baby. Everyone believes the doctor and Jyoti wishes she had a child. Choti Ma is angry at Pankaj and wants him to give the baby back. Finally, Jyoti marries Kabir. Jyoti and Kabir are happily married, but is there something stopping Jyoti from entering her new house? Jyoti now lives in a haveli against her in-laws wish. Actually Kabirs chachisa wants him to get marry to her niece. Now Chachisa plans to get rid of Jyoti with bhapusa and Sumer bhaisa.

Jyoti has found out that her friend who is just like a sister to her, Rashmi's baby's father, is none other than Kabir's younger brother Vikrant. Jyoti makes a plan to get them married. After many complications she succeeds, but Vikrant does not accept Rashmi or the baby; he treats them very badly. Chachisa has gone to a professional to get Jyoti killed. When the killer comes for Jyoti, Jyoti misunderstands that he is here to kill Kabir. The killer shoots, Jyoti jumps in front of Kabir, and the bullet hits her. Jyoti ends up in ICU and is very critical. Kabir stays with her the whole night. Jyoti kept on hearing cries from the ward next door. She then goes to see who it was. It was a girl called Roshni, Jyoti's real baby. Jyoti took the baby and rocked her in her arms. The baby eventually stopped crying. Jyoti left the ward when the baby fell asleep. The next day Jyoti was ready to leave the hospital and go home. Jyoti forgot to take her watch so she goes back to the hospital to pick it up. Jyoti also discovers that the baby is not in its ward. She asks the doctor where she is. The doctor says she got really ill so they had to take her to the ice room. Jyoti then takes the baby home to look after because Pankaj is busy. When Jyoti gives back Roshni she forgot to give Roshni's bag back too. She then turns it round and sees that the baby's name is Roshni Vashisht: her baby. She goes to Pankaj's house and asks for Roshni back. Pankaj refuses and asks "Who do you want more Roshni or Kabir?" Because Roshni has a cancer (Leukemia) which will be only treated with the bone marrow of another child of Pankaj and Jyoti.

Pankaj tells Jyoti to either have another baby with him or have a test tube baby. She consults her mother who tells her to choose her husband Kabir and never to take any step like that. But after discussing with kabir, Jyoti gets pregnant with Pankaj's child by Artificial Insemination. Kabir accepts what she said and is with her. Nine months later Kabir and Jyoti meet some people who wanted to kill Kabir which was sent by chachi sa; suddenly Pankaj arrives and saves him. They highly injured Pankaj which led to his death. Jyoti and Kabir go to the hospital. She gives birth to a boy and Roshni's life got saved. When they reach, home Chachi sa has a gun and is about to shoot Jyoti when Chachi sa's son Vikrant shoots Chachi sa, and she dies. After some years, the kids grow up. It is Jyoti's birthday. The kids and the family have a big party at home. Roshni then wants to know Jyoti's whole life story and she tells her.

== Cast ==
- Sneha Wagh as Jyoti Sharma, Jyoti Pankaj Vashisht and Jyoti Kabir Pratap Singh Sisodia : Roshani and Pankaj's son mother and Kabir's wife
- Aamir Dalvi as Kabir Pratap Singh Sisodia: Roshani and Pankaj's son step father and Jyoti's husband
- Sarwar Ahuja as Sachin / Pankaj Vashisht: Roshani and Pankaj's father and Jyoti's ex-husband
- Sriti Jha as Sudha (Devika) Sharma and Sudha Uday Vashisht
- Srinidhi Shetty as Sushma Sharma and Sushma Brij Bhushan Shastri
- Sameer Sharma as Brij Bhushan Shastri
- Varun Khandelwal as Deepu "Sandeep"(Sandy) Sharma
- Via Roy Choudhury as Panchi, Sandeep's Girl friend
- Geetu Bawa as Poonam Sharma, Sandeep's wife
- Madhumalti Kapoor as Annapurna, Jyoti's Grandmother
- Zahida Parveen as Padma Kamalkishore Sharma, Jyoti's stepmother
- Sanjay Batra as Kamalkishore Sharma, Jyoti's father
- Kalpana Bora as Dr. Kalpana Awasti, Jyoti's Friend and Sudha's Psychologist
- Geeta Udeshi as Sudha's library teacher
- Shilpa Saklani as Ritu, Jyoti's student Divorced Mother
- Soma Rathod as Lady police
- Sonia Singh as Neelam Pankaj Vashisht, Pankaj's second wife
- Tuhina Vohra / Alka Kaushal as Bhairavi Vashisht, Pankaj's Choti Maa
- Divyaalakshmi as Meenal Vashist
- Alok Narula as Uday Vashisht
- Baby as Roshani sisodia: Kabir and Jyoti's daughter
- Pallavi Purohit as Asha Sisodia
- Ankit Arora as Vikrant Sisodia
- Rituraj Singh as Raghvendra Pratap Singh Sisodia (Mayor Sahab), Kabir's father: Roshani's step grandfather
- Karmveer Choudhary as Roy Sahab
- Aalika Sheikh as Varnika
- Harsh Vashisht as Raghuveer Sisodiya, Kabir's elder brother
- Vimarsh Roshan as Sumer Sisodiya, Kabir's eldest brother

== Production ==
Speaking about the series writer Purnendu Shekhar said: "Jyoti is inspired by a person who was very close to me. She used to tie rakhi to me. So she was like my sister. Her story was waiting to be told, and it was easier to keep the story real as the twists and turns did take place in her life. Most scenes and also dialogues have actually taken place."

The channel had a tie-up with Bell Bhajao Campaign reaching out about 124 million people for promoting the series in October 2009.
