= Gul Nawaz Warraich =

Pakistani politician

Member of the Provincial Assembly of the Punjab

Personal details
- Born: Gujrat, Punjab, Pakistan
- Party: Pakistan Muslim League (Nawaz)

Gul Nawaz Warraich (Urdu: گل نواز وڑائچ) is a Pakistani politician who has served as the member of the Punjab Assembly.

== See also ==
- Politics of Pakistan
- List of political parties in Pakistan
