= Fakir Azizuddin =

Foreign Minister of the Sikh Empire

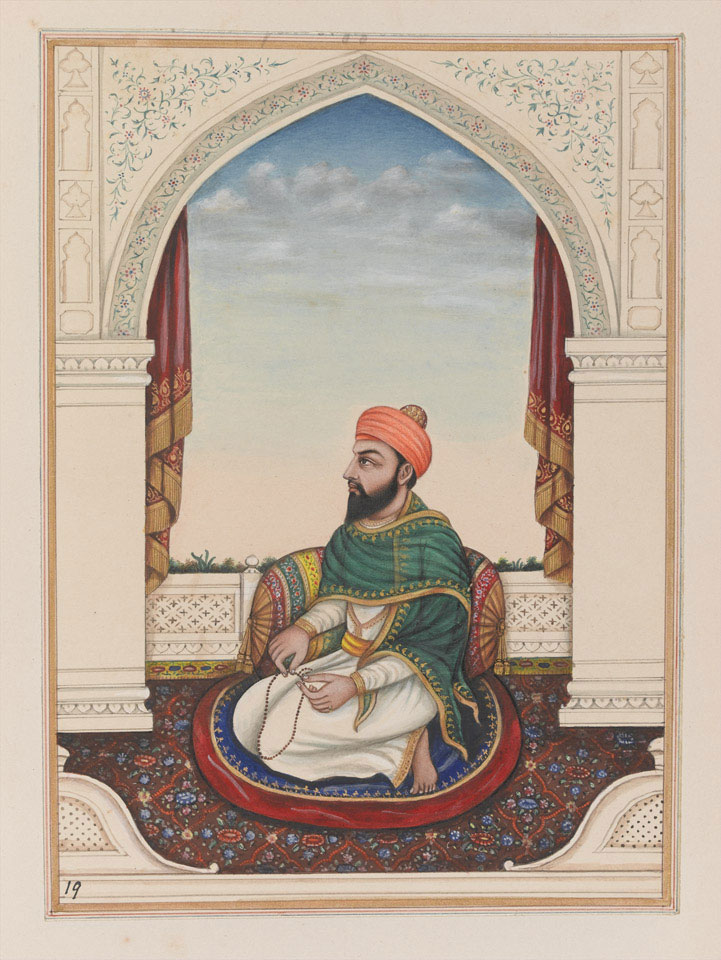
- Fakir Azizuddin. Watercolour by a Company artist, Punjab, c. 1865

Foreign minister of the Sikh Empire
- Preceded by: Zahadat Shah
- Succeeded by: Abdullah Syed

Personal details
- Born: 1780 Lahore, Bhangi Misl, Sikh Confederacy (present-day Punjab, Pakistan)
- Died: 3 December 1845 (aged 65) Lahore, Sikh Empire (present-day Punjab, Pakistan)
- Children: Shah Dilzar Khan
- Occupation: Foreign Minister, Physician, Linguist, Diplomat
- Religion: Shia Islam

Fakir Aziz ud-Din (Note: Punjabi: فقیر عزیزالدین (Shahmukhi); ਫ਼ਕੀਰ ਅਜ਼ੀਜ਼ ਉੱਦੀਨ (Gurmukhi)) (1780–1845) was a physician, linguist, diplomat, and foreign minister at the court of maharaja Ranjit Singh of the Sikh Empire. He was a Muslim belonging to a Sayyid family and was one of the many non-Sikhs in Ranjit Singh's court.

He was the eldest son of Hakīm Ghulām Mohy-ud-Dīn and had two brothers, Nūr ud-Dīn and Imām ud-Dīn. Both had senior military posts in the empire. He was apprenticed as a physician, and was originally known by the title Hakīm (physician). Later in life, he adopted the title Fakir (beggar), as a mark of humility, that title appearing in British correspondence after 1826.

His first contact with Ranjit Singh was as a physician. The Maharaja was impressed by his medical skill and proficiency in languages – Arabic, Persian and English – and granted him a jagir and a position at court. His first major assignment was to assist the Maharaja in the negotiations with the British which led to the 1809 Treaty of Amritsar. Between 1810 and 1838 there followed a great number of diplomatic assignments and tasks as an interpreter. The Maharaja had complete trust in him and rewarded him with honours and jagirs.

Aziz ud-Din continued in the service of the Sikh Empire after the death of Ranjit Singh. In December 1839 he represented Maharaja Kharak Singh on a mission to the British Governor-General, Lord Auckland. In 1842, on behalf of Maharaja Sher Singh, he welcomed the new Governor-General, Lord Ellenborough, at Firozpur. He remained scrupulously aloof from the factional intrigues which had overtaken the empire after Ranjit Singh's death.

Saddened at the turn events had taken and by the death of two of his sons, Aziz ud-Din died in Lahore on 3 December 1845, aged 65.
