= Padatha Painkili (TV series) =

Indian television soap opera

- Genre: Family drama Romance
- Based on: Ke Apon Ke Por
- Developed by: Ayan Bera
- Screenplay by: Dinesh Pallath; Dialogues; Dinesh Pallath
- Story by: Ayan Bera
- Directed by: Sudheesh Sankar
- Creative director: Subramaniam Murugan
- Presented by: Merryland Studios
- Starring: Maneesha Mahesh; Manu Martin Pallippadan
- Narrated by: Devi S.
- Theme music composer: M. Jayachandran
- Opening theme: "Paadatha Painkili Nee" by Sithara Krishnakumar and K.S. Harisankar
- Ending theme: "Minnum Chinnum Pularikale" by Soumya Sathanandan & Sreelakshmi Narayanan
- Composers: Santhosh Perali & Anupama (lyrics); Soumya Sanathanan & Babu Krishna (music)
- Country of origin: India
- Original language: Malayalam
- No. of seasons: 1
- No. of episodes: 678

Production
- Production location: Trivandrum
- Cinematography: Shinjith Kaimala
- Editor: Anilal O.
- Camera setup: Multi-camera
- Running time: 22 minutes
- Production company: Sreesaran Creations

Original release
- Network: Asianet; Disney+ Hotstar
- Release: 7 September 2020 – 24 March 2023

Related
- Ke Apon Ke Por

Paadatha Painkili is an Indian Malayalam television soap opera that aired on Malayalam Entertainment Channel Asianet and is available on the digital platform Disney+ Hotstar. The show is produced by Merryland Studio of P. Subramaniam. It is a remake of the Bengali serial Ke Apon Ke Por. The show premiered on 7 September 2020 and ended on 24 March 2023.

== Plot ==
The plot focuses on the story of Kanmani. Both Ananda Varma and his wife Susheela treat Kanmani as their own daughter, but their daughters-in-law Swapna, Ananya and Tanuja who is also Anand's eldest daughter worry that Kanmani will inherit part of the family property, reducing their own shares. They mistreat Kanmani. Deva is Anand's youngest son. Deva takes a stand against the difficulties Kanmani faces.

Deva's girlfriend Madhurima comes from Dubai to visit his family. Ananya's brother Bharat attempts to kill Kanmani and is stopped by Deva. Deva has the idea that Kanmani should marry and decides to get her married to Ranjith. Ranjith and his family comes to visit and fixes the marriage. However, on the day of marriage, it is revealed that Ranjith is a criminal who marries wealthy women to take away their wealth and the police arrest Ranjith.

Meanwhile, Deva and Madhurima are planning to get engaged on Kanmani's wedding day. Madhurima gets the news that her father is ill and decides to go to her house. Kanmani's marriage is stopped, and Anand is blamed by everyone for Kanmani's pitiable position. Anand, who is in a devastated state, persuades Deva to marry Kanmani to mitigate the disaster of the failed wedding. Madhurima arrives at the last moment, just in time to see the wedding become official. Madhurima asks Deva whether he married Kanmani only out of pity, but Deva remains silent, and she leaves, angrily.

After Madhurima leaves, Deva allows himself to show his anger by throwing things. Susheela realises for the first time that her son has been sacrificed. She too becomes furious and turns against her husband, and eventually against Kanmani. Kanmani does not expect Deva to treat her like a real wife, so she continues to work as a maid. One day Susheela's sister comes to meet Deva's wife, not knowing the history, and she criticises the family for marrying a maid to their son. Humiliated, Susheela is persuaded by Swapna and Ananya to call Madhurima back. Meanwhile, Anand plans to hold a reception for the newlyweds. No one supports his decision except his youngest daughter Avantika.

Madhurima comes to the reception of Deva and Kanmani and creates drama when Deva accepts Kanmani as his wife. Then the couple prepares to spend their first night together. But Susheela suddenly begins to have chest pains. Deva panics and stays with his mother. Since she is not allowed to see Susheela, Kanmani sleeps alone in the room that she was to share with Deva. This event is a turning point, as Susheela and Deva begin to appreciate Kanmani. Swapna, Ananya and Bharat all try to undermine Kanmani and make her leave the house, but the result is that Deva begins to fall in love with her.

Deva entrusts Kanmani with documents relating to his confidential project hon topics to do with his work. Swapna, Ananya and Bharat steal the documents and put the blame on Kanmani. Deva is angry and says humiliating things to Kanmani. Kanmani finds the documents and reveals that Bharat was the thief but is so humiliated that she leaves the house. Deva later finds her and brings her home. Deva and Kanmani's relationship becomes stronger, and Deva confesses his love to Kanmani and she accepts.

== Cast ==
=== Main ===
- Maneesha Mahesh as Kanmani, Deva's wife.
- Sooraj Sun (episode 1–197) / Luckgith Saini (episode 198- 417) / Manu Martin Pallippadan (episode 418-678) as Deva, Kanmani's husband, Madhurima's ex-boyfriend.

=== Recurring ===
- Prem Prakash (episode 1–6) / Dinesh Panicker (episode 6-678) as Ananda Varma, Vijay, Arvind, Tanuja, Deva and Avantika's father
- Ambika Mohan as Susheela Devi, Vijay, Arvind, Tanuja, Deva and Avantika's mother
- Fazal Razi as Vijay, Swapna's husband, Deva's eldest brother
- Preetha Pradeep (episode 1–6) / Archana Suseelan (episodes 6–228)→ Amritha Prasanth (episode 229-678) as Swapna, Vijay's wife, eldest daughter-in-law of Anand Verma
- Sabarinath (episodes 1 to 48, deceased) / Pradeep Chandran (episodes 51 to 67) / Naveen Arakkal (episodes 67 –) as Aravind, Ananya's husband, Deva's elder brother (dead)
- Anjitha BR as Ananya, Arvind's wife, second daughter-in-law of the house, Thumbimol and Kunju's mother
- Rahul R as Ravi, Tanuja's husband and Sheetal's father
- Soumya Sreekumar / Kalyani Nair as Tanuja Ravi, Ravi's wife, Deva's elder sister and Anand Verma and Susheela Devi's eldest daughter, Sheetal's mother.
- Sachin SG as Bharath, Ananya's brother, Avantika's husband and Deva's Brother-in-Law
- Anumol RS / Aiswarya Devi as Avanthika, Anand Verma and Susheela Devi's youngest daughter and Deva's younger sister, Bharath's wife
- Ankhitha Vinod as Madhurima, Deva's ex-girlfriend
- Kottayam Rasheed as Peppara Gowthaman, father of Ananya & Bharath, a local thug
- Ashtami R Krishna as Sheethal, Tanuja and Ravi's daughter. She is physically disabled.
- Sreelatha Namboothiri as Panamthottathil Elizabeth
- Maneesh Krishna as Thejas
- Sini Prasad as Sasikala
- Baby Krishna Thejaswini as Thumbimol, Ananya and Aravind's daughter, Kunju's sister
- Sidharth as Ranjith
- Amboori Jayan as Sudhakaran
- Chithra as Kanaka
- Aparna P Nair as Devamma
- Leena Nair as ACP Reetha Kurian
- Alif Sha as Denson
- Renjith Menon as Sachin
- Sumi Rashik as Shanthi
- Raheena Anas as Aruna

== Adaptations ==
Language	Title	Original release	Network(s)	Last aired	Notes
Bengali	Ke Apon Ke Por কে আপন কে পর	25 July 2016	Star Jalsha	27 December 2020	Original
Tamil	Raja Rani ராஜா ராணி	29 May 2017	Star Vijay	13 July 2019	Remake
Telugu	Kathalo Rajakumari కథలో రాజకుమారి	29 January 2018	Star Maa	24 January 2020	Remake
Marathi	Sukh Mhanje Nakki Kay Asta! सुख म्हणजे नक्की काय असतं!	17 August 2020	Star Pravah	22 December 2024	Remake
Malayalam	Padatha Painkili പാടാത്ത പൈങ്കിളി	7 September 2020	Asianet	24 March 2023	Remake
Hindi	Saath Nibhaana Saathiya 2 साथ निभाना साथिया २	19 October 2020	StarPlus	16 July 2022	Remake

== Reception ==
The show is premiered on Asianet on 7 September 2020 at 8:30 PM IST. Initially, the show earned good viewership, but it dropped when Sooraj Sun appeared as main protagonist left the show due to some health issues. Later the show moved to 10:00 PM IST due to low TRP ratings. On 28 March 2022, the show moved to 2:30 PM IST in respect to the timing of Bigg Boss season 4.From 28 November 2022, the show is again shifted back to 10:00 PM IST and went off-air on 24 March 2023 .
