= Kathalo Rajakumari (TV series) =

Indian Telugu-language TV series

- Genre: Drama; Soap opera; Romance
- Starring: See below
- Country of origin: India
- Original language: Telugu
- No. of episodes: 539

Production
- Camera setup: Multi-camera
- Running time: 22 minutes
- Production company: Annapoorna Studios

Original release
- Network: Star Maa
- Release: 29 January 2018 – 24 January 2020

Related
- Ke Apon Ke Por

Kathalo Rajakumari is an Indian Telugu drama television series that aired on Star Maa. Madhusudan and Ashika Gopal Padukone are the main protagonists of the series. The show has consistently topped the ratings chart since its inception. The show is the remake of Bengali television series Ke Apon Ke Por which is being aired on Star Jalsha.

== Plot ==
Circumstances lead Avani, a maid to marry Akshay, the Singapore returned son of RadhaKrishna. Her problems escalate as she struggles to become a deserving daughter-in-law in her new household. How she manages to prove herself forms the crux of the story.

== Cast ==
- Madhusudan as Jagarlamoodi Akshay: Avani's husband; Radhakrishna and Sulochana's son; Sudansh, Mithra, Charu and Subadhra's brother; Pavani's former love interest
- Ashika Gopal Padukone as Jagarlamoodi Avani: Akshay's wife; The maid turned daughter-in-law of Jagarlamoodi family.
- Anusha Reddy as Pavani Kuchupudi: Akshay's former love interest and Obsessive lover
- Anil Allam as Jagarlamoodi Radhakrishna: Sulochana's husband; Sudhansh, Mithra, Charu, Akshay and Subadhra's father; Swarna, Hasini and Avani's father-in-law
- Niharika as Jagarlamoodi Sulochana Devi: Radhakrishna's wife; Sudhansh, Mithra, Charu, Akshay and Subadhra's mother; Swarna, Hasini and Avani's mother-in-law
- Kalyan as Jagarlamoodi Sudhansh: Swarna's husband; Radhakrishna and Sulochana's elder son; Mithra, Charu, Akshay and Subadhra's brother
- Madhu Reddy as Jagarlamoodi Swarnamukhi "Swarna": Sudhansh's wife; Radhakrishna and Sulochana's elder daughter-in-law
- Sudeera as Jagarlamoodi Subadhra: Radhakrishna and Sulochana's daughter; Sudhansh, Mithra, Charu, Akshay's sister
- Sushma Reddy as Jagarlamoodi Hasini: Mithra's wife
- Hritesh as Jagarlamoodi Mithra: Hasini's husband; Radhakrishna and Sulochana's son; Sudhansh, Charu, Akshay and Subadhra's brother

== Adaptations ==
Language	Title	Original release	Network(s)	Last aired	Notes
Bengali	Ke Apon Ke Por কে আপন কে পর	25 July 2016	Star Jalsha	27 December 2020	Original
Tamil	Raja Rani ராஜா ராணி	29 May 2017	Star Vijay	13 July 2019	Remake
Telugu	Kathalo Rajakumari కథలో రాజకుమారి	29 January 2018	Star Maa	24 January 2020	Remake
Marathi	Sukh Mhanje Nakki Kay Asta! सुख म्हणजे नक्की काय असतं!	17 August 2020	Star Pravah	Ongoing	Remake
Malayalam	Padatha Painkili പാടാത്ത പൈങ്കിളി	7 September 2020	Asianet	24 March 2023	Remake
Hindi	Saath Nibhaana Saathiya 2 साथ निभाना साथिया २	19 October 2020	StarPlus	16 July 2022	Remake
