= Tea (meal) =

Informal afternoon meal

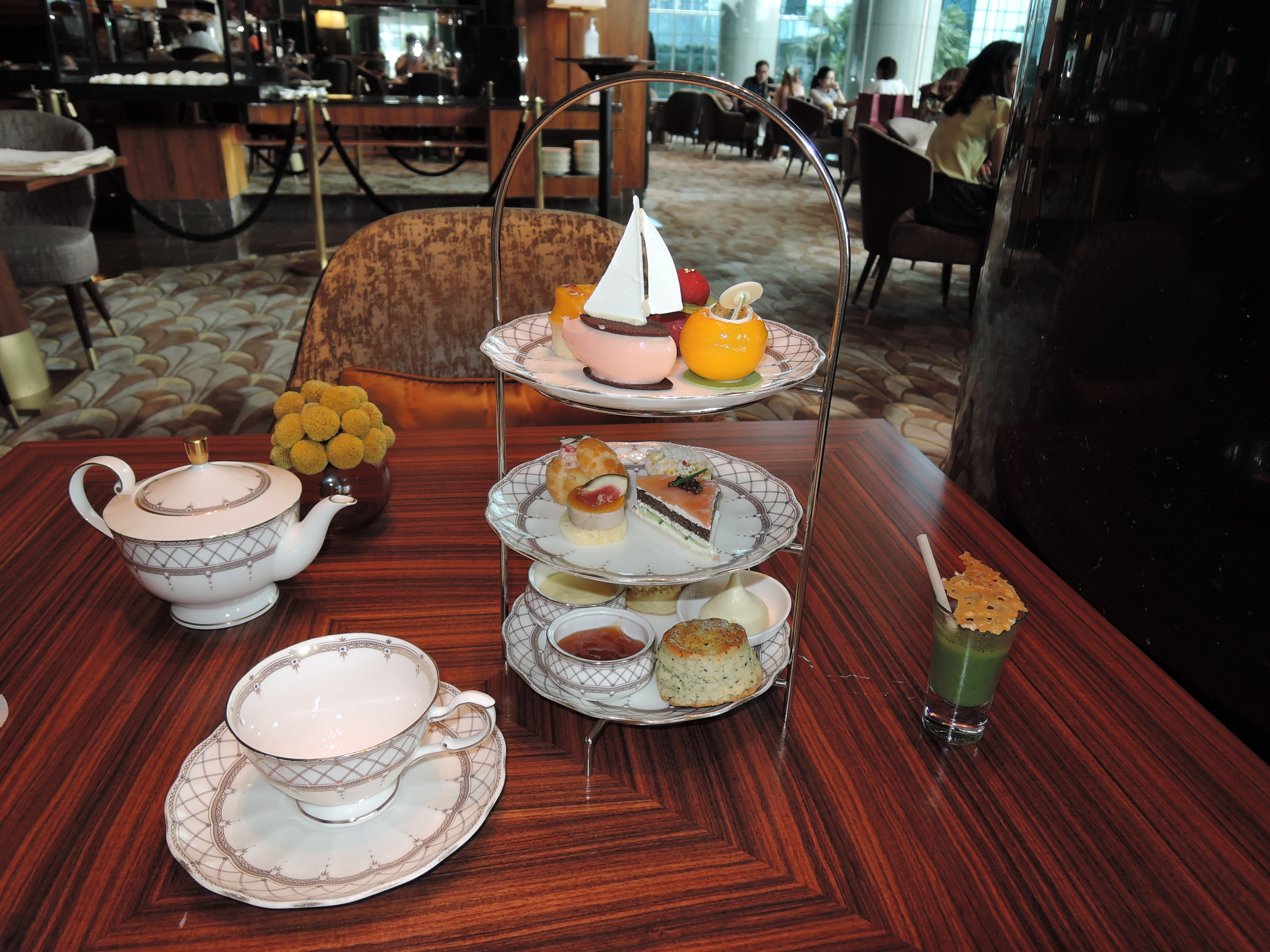
Afternoon tea with scones, jam, and little cakes at the Grand Hyatt Hong Kong

Tea is an umbrella term for several different meals consisting of food sometimes accompanied by tea to drink. The English writer Isabella Beeton, whose books on home economics were widely read in the 19th century, describes meals of various kinds and provides menus for the "old-fashioned tea", the "at-home tea", the "family tea", and the "high tea".

Teatime is the time at which this meal is usually eaten, which is mid-afternoon to early evening. Tea as a meal is associated with the United Kingdom and some Commonwealth countries. Some people in Britain and Australasia refer to their main evening meal as "tea" rather than "dinner" or "supper". The use of "tea" varies by social class. "Tea" can refer to a light meal or a snack. A tea break is the term used for a work break in either the morning or afternoon for a cup of tea or other beverage.

The most common elements of the "afternoon tea" as a meal are the drink itself and baked goods such as cakes, scones and bread and jam, and perhaps sandwiches. These are the pillars of the "traditional afternoon tea" offered by London hotels. Other types of both drink and food may be offered at home.

== History ==
=== Early history ===
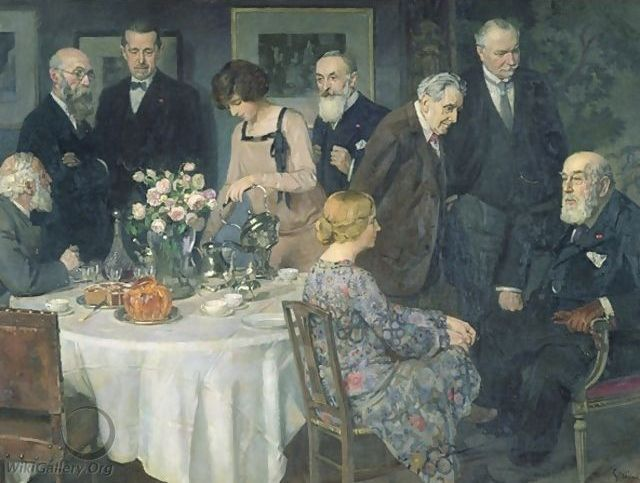
Thé avec des artistes ("Tea with the artists"), Jules Grün, 1929

While the custom of drinking tea in the afternoon may have existed from the late 17th century, tea as a meal is a later invention, dating to the late 18th or early 19th centuries. An early French reference to "afternoon tea" was made by Madame de Sévigné (1626–1696), who used the term thé de cinq heures ("five o’clock tea") in her letters.

William H. Ukers notes that Alexander Carlyle used the term "afternoon tea" in his autobiography. He describes the ladies of Harrogate serving "afternoon tea or coffee" in 1763. The Oxford English Dictionary provides other early examples of reference to tea as a social gathering. The earliest is from Jonathan Swift's satirical etiquette guide, A Complete Collection of Genteel and Ingenious Conversation (1738), "Whether they meet..at Meals, Tea, or Visits". John Wesley and Harriet Martineau also are quoted.

The timing of the tea meal has moved over the centuries in response to the migration of the main meal, dinner. Until the late 18th century dinner was eaten at what is now called "lunchtime", or in the early afternoon. Supper was a later and lighter meal. Dinner remains a midday meal in some regions. Gradually, dinner began to migrate, amid much controversy, until by about 1900 it arrived at its present timing, in most places, in the evening. At first, the "tea" meal was often in the early evening, some three or four hours after mid-day dinner; another version of the tea meal was even later, after a supper and before bed. Philosopher Thomas Carlyle and his wife Jane Welsh Carlyle invited guests for 7 pm to their teas in the 1850s, although "afternoon tea" before dinner was also becoming established by this time.

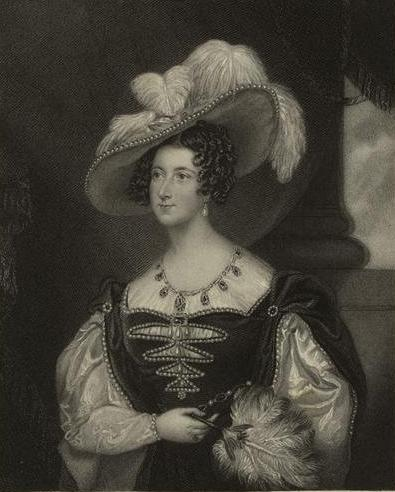
Anna Russell, Duchess of Bedford, 1820, the founder of afternoon tea

In 1804 Alexandre Balthazar Laurent Grimod de La Reynière wrote (in French) about afternoon tea in Switzerland:

Towards five o'clock in the evening, the mistress of the house, in the midst of the sitting-room, makes tea herself, very strong and barely sweetened with a few drops of rich cream; generous slices of buttered bread accompany it. Such is the Swiss Tea in all its simplicity. In most opulent houses, however, coffee and light pastries of all kinds are added, many of which are unknown in Paris, preserved or candied fruits, macaroons, biscuits, nougat, and even ice cream.

=== Popularisation ===
Anna Russell, the Duchess of Bedford, is commonly cited as the originator of the meal of afternoon tea. Accordingly to the story, at some time in the 1830s or 1840s, the duchess requested a collation of tea and snacks be sent up to her room between the mid-day and evening meals. During this period, it was the custom for the aristocracy to take their evening meal no earlier than 19:30, or 20:00. The duchess, who found herself hungry during the intervening period, is said to have devised afternoon tea as a means to endure the long wait until the evening meal. Later, she turned this personal habit into an opportunity for social gathering.

The duchess's role in establishing the custom of afternoon tea is a matter of controversy. According to Julia Skinner, there are two theories of her involvement. One claims that afternoon tea as a meal predates the duchess's birth, and that the timings of meals in Britain had already entered a period of transition. The other argues that the duchess codified what had been an informal custom, establishing a defined etiquette, menu, and ritual for afternoon tea. The duchess served as Lady of the Bedchamber to Queen Victoria, a socially prominent position that allowed her to become a trendsetter.

The custom of afternoon tea first spread among the aristocracy. It was later adopted by others in emulation, and by the 1860s–1870s, it had spread to the middle class. While afternoon tea, also known as "low tea" became popular among the upper and middle classes, the working class adopted a different meal called "high tea", which was taken around the same time, but much heartier. This separate custom emerged due to a change in working habits.

By the end the 19th century, the concept of tea as a meal, whether in the form of afternoon or high tea, had become established among all social classes. It became ubiquitous, even in the isolated village in the fictionalised memoir Lark Rise to Candleford (1945), where a cottager prepares what she calls a "visitor's tea" for their landlady: "the table was laid... there were the best tea things with a fat pink rose on the side of each cup; hearts of lettuce, thin bread and butter, and the crisp little cakes that had been baked in readiness that morning."

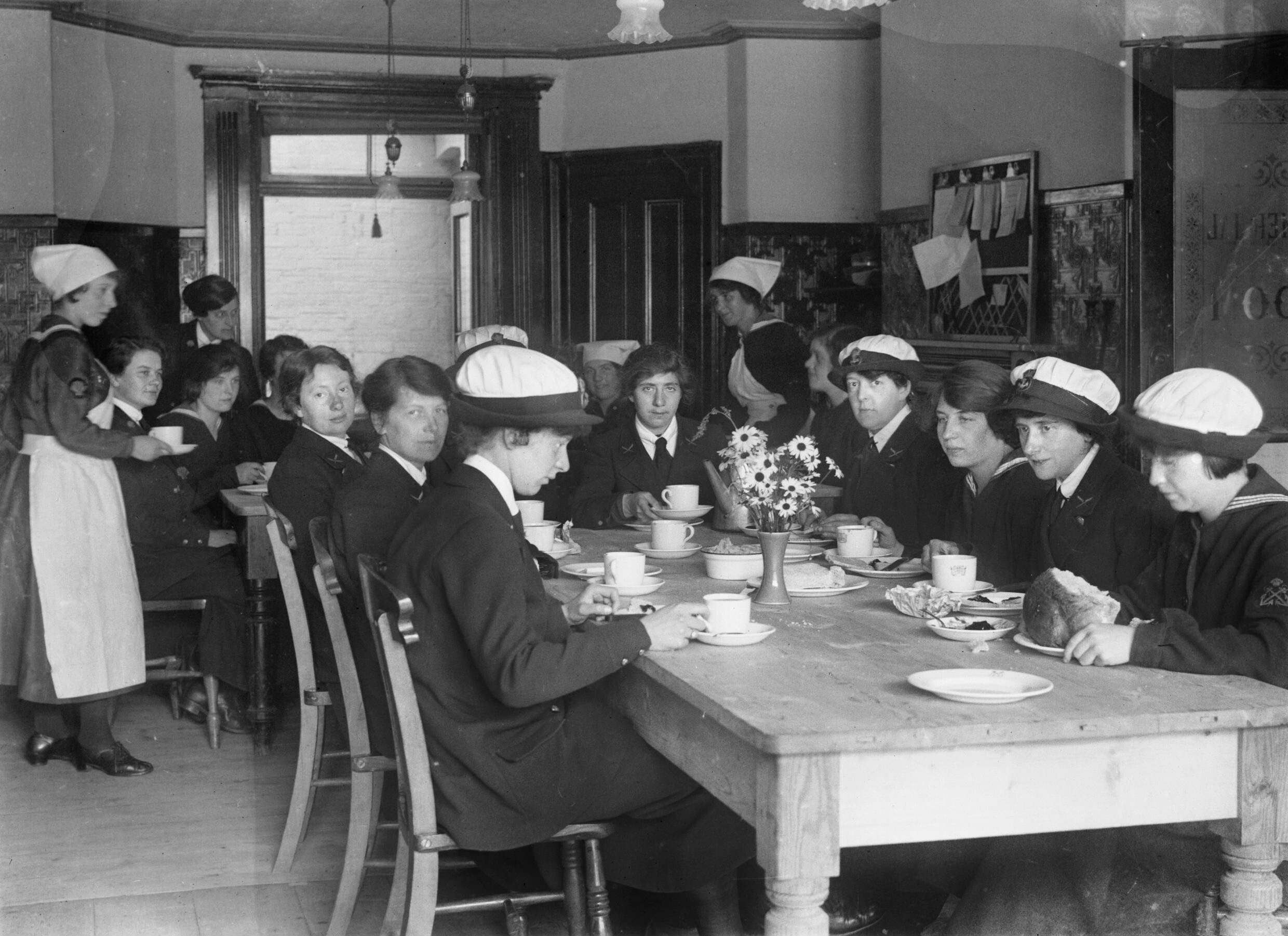
Women's Royal Naval Service ratings sitting down to tea at their mess during World War I

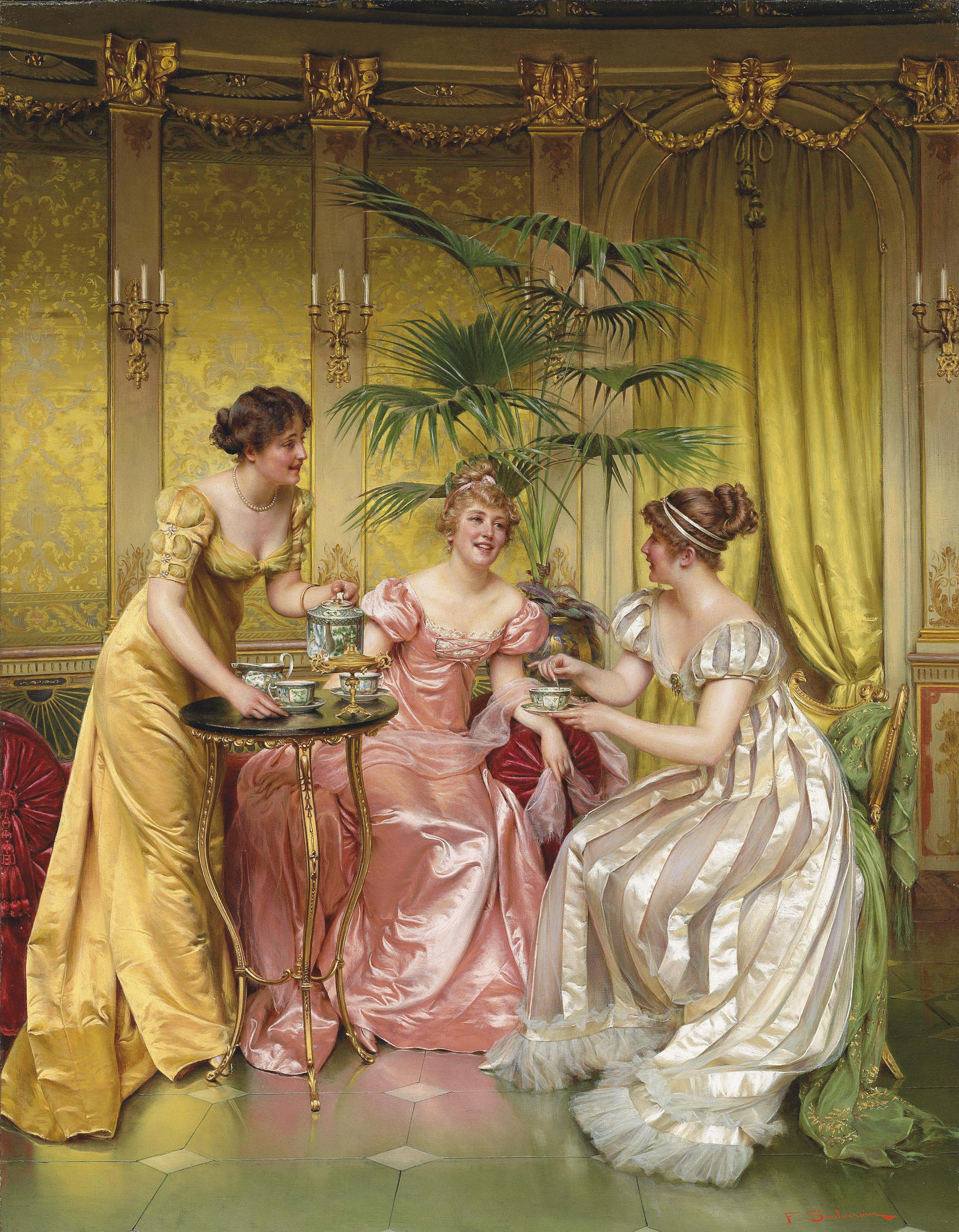
"Afternoon tea for three", by Frédéric Soulacroix, 1870s

Afternoon tea receptions were considered "least formal, most friendly and enjoyable of all entertainments given at home." According to the etiquette guide "The Habits of Good Society", their "chief charm [was] that a tea-party [could] be arranged in two or three days notice." Helen Simpson says that conversation during traditional afternoon teas was deliberately limited to mundane small talk. English author Saki satirised the inanity of these exchanges in his short story, Tea.

Guests were not expected to stay long – half an hour of pleasant conversation was sufficient. If a guest wished to speak with the hostess or with the special guest in whose honour the tea was held, they would approach at an appropriate moment, but should not detain them for long, especially when there were many visitors in the house. During the height of the summer tea season, ladies would remain in one place for no more than fifteen minutes before proceeding to the next afternoon tea.

Tea gowns were loose-fitting garments, often made of chiffon, that were traditionally worn by ladies during afternoon teas held at home from 1875 to the 1920s. They served to provide participants a brief reprieve from the uncomfortable corsets regularly worn in the latter half of the 19th century.

=== Tea-serving establishments ===
Commercial establishments known as teahouses or tearooms which served tea as a meal were once common in the UK, but they have declined in popularity since the Second World War. The first tea room was established at Glasgow in Scotland by tea merchant Stuart Cranston during the 1880s. His sister, Catherine Cranston, later opened a chain of tea rooms, which included the Willow Tearooms, designed by Charles Rennie Mackintosh.

In London, the Aerated Bread Company and Lyons operated popular chains. A list of significant tea houses in Britain gives more examples. Unlike the earlier English coffeehouses, these new establishments welcomed female patrons. Outdoor tea gardens also became popular, and were operated at Hyde Park and Kensington Gardens. Afternoon tea was also served in the halls of many British hotels, during matinee performances at theatres and cinemas, at railway stations, in restaurant cars, to passengers on British ocean liners and aeroplanes, by clubs, and at important social events, at horse races, regattas, bridge and tennis matches, cricket games, and at the annual garden parties of the British royal family.

=== Contemporary significance ===
The popularity of tea, both as a beverage and as a light meal, declined somewhat in the mid-20th century, but from the beginning of the 21st century it has been experiencing a revival: more and more establishments are returning it to their menus, and the people of Britain and the Commonwealth are showing growing interest in both domestic and public tea services. As in the early 20th century, hotels and restaurants have embraced the trend, and the service often extends beyond dining rooms into lounge areas and common spaces. Guests are willing to pay substantial sums for a modest meal that is easy to prepare in the kitchen and generates income during the lull between lunch and dinner.

Tea establishments and restaurants usually offer patrons a choice of at least a dozen tea varieties, including traditional black teas, herbal infusions, rooibos, and green teas. Food and beverage managers in British hotels design menus emphasising variety – in dishes as well as tea types. Some establishments even employ tea sommeliers who create a tea menu including varieties from around the world.

In Britain, afternoon tea occupies a dual position: on one hand, it is sometimes considered an outdated tradition; on the other hand, it remains an important part of the country's gastronomic identity. Today, the tradition is maintained at the Ritz Hotel, London, and other hotels. In London, the major hotels compete for the annual Afternoon Tea Awards. In Canada, afternoon tea ceremonies at the grand railway hotels are a well-known tradition across the country. In Australia, venues nationwide ranging from the Hotel Windsor in Melbourne, which first served high tea in 1883, to hotels opened in the 21st century serve a variety of afternoon teas, including traditional, modern, and novel, sometimes with items flavoured using local ingredients. In the United States, the "afternoon tea industry" is also primarily the province of destination hotels.

== Types ==
=== Afternoon tea ===
Afternoon tea, also called low tea, is a light meal originally eaten between 16:00 and 17:00. It consisted of thinly sliced bread and butter, delicate sandwiches (customarily cucumber sandwiches or egg and cress sandwiches) and usually cakes, such as Battenberg cake or Victoria sponge, and other baked goods. Scones (with clotted cream and jam) would also be served, as they are for cream tea. The sandwiches are usually crustless, cut into small segments, either as triangles or fingers, and pressed thin. Biscuits are not usually served.

A multi-tiered stand for serving sandwiches, scones, and other baked goods is often placed in the centre of the table, along with napkins. The bottom tier holds sandwiches, the middle tier scones, and the top tier petit fours and sweet cakes. Typically, black tea is served, often Darjeeling, Assam, Earl Grey, or Ceylon tea, served with milk, or lemon if serving Chinese or Russian-style tea.

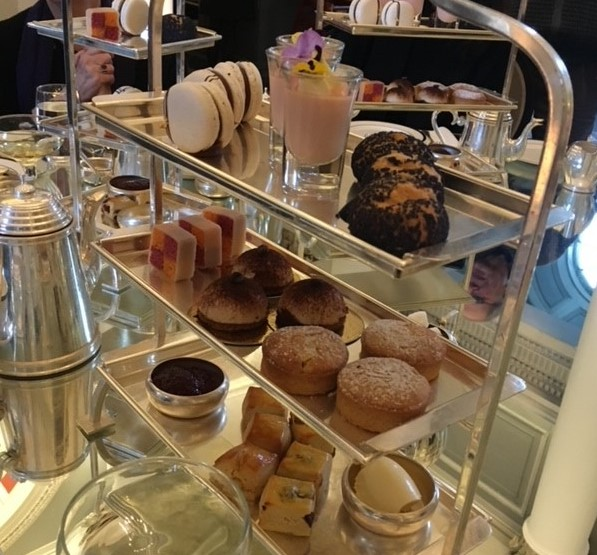
Afternoon tea on a silver serving tower at a hotel in Edinburgh

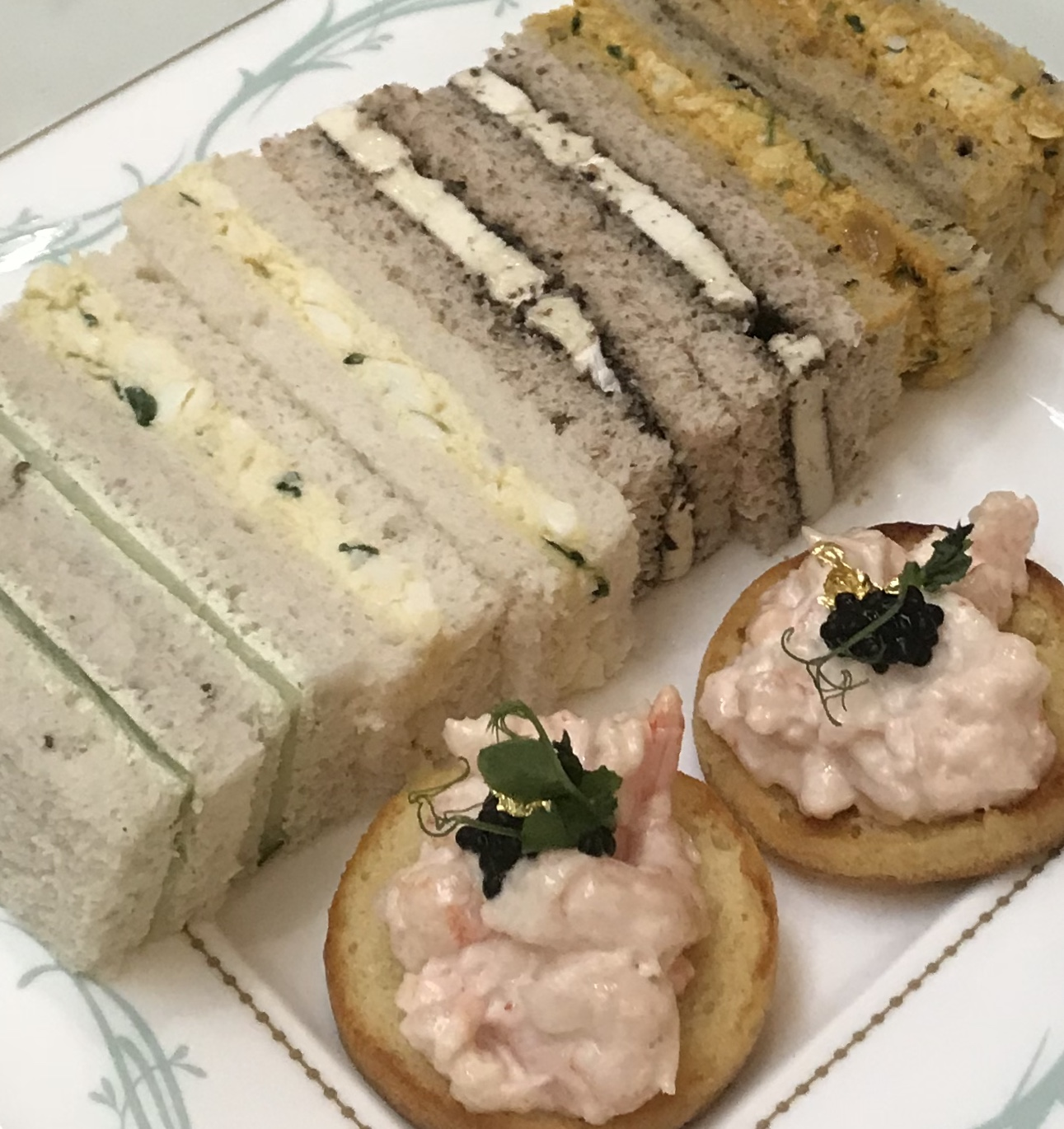
Finger sandwiches: cucumber, egg, cheese, curried chicken, with prawn canapés served at the Savoy in London

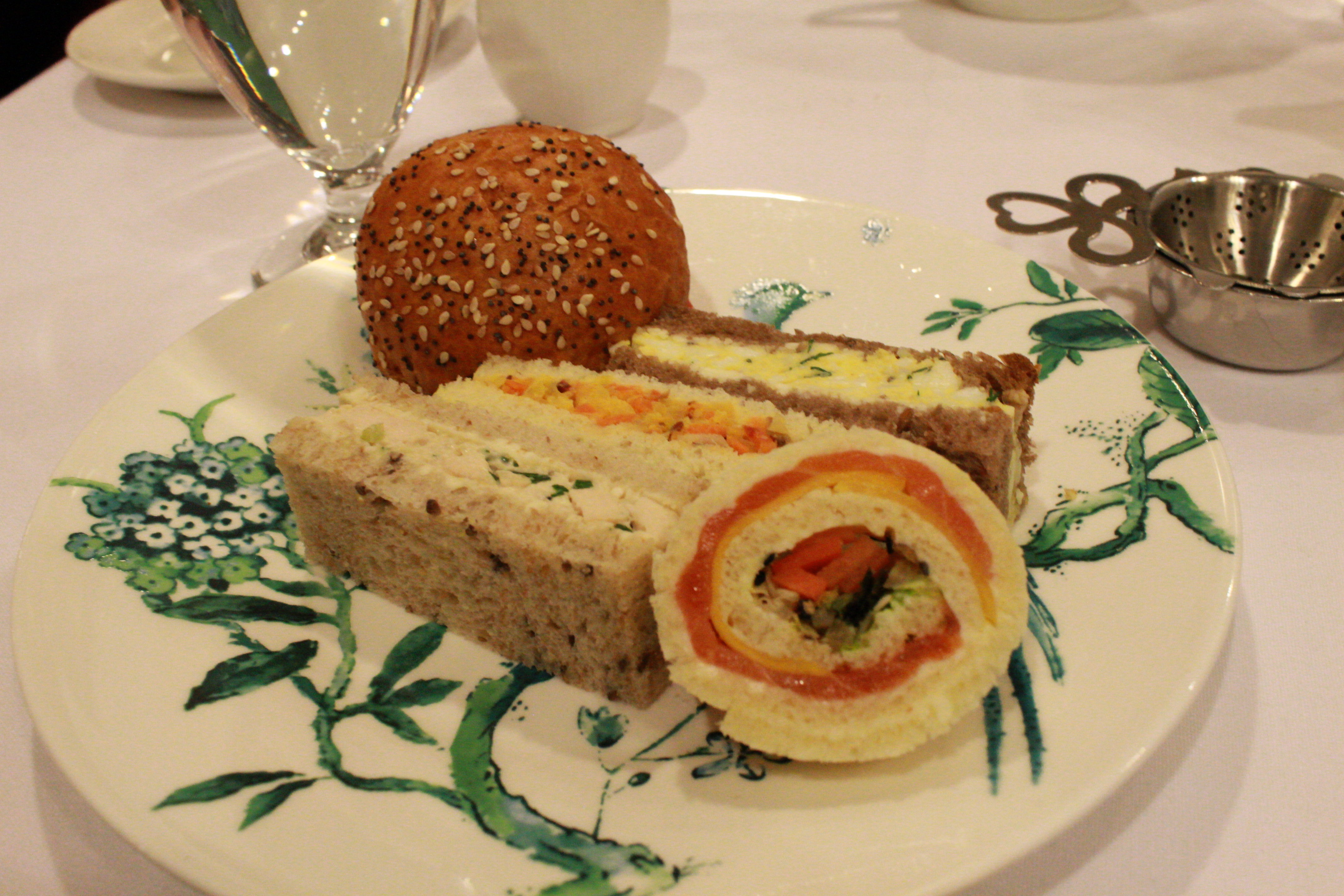
A typical afternoon tea sandwich selection at the King Edward Hotel in Toronto

=== High tea ===
High tea is a late afternoon or early evening meal, sometimes associated with the working class, farming, and eating after sports matches. It is typically eaten between 5 pm and 7 pm. Its name originates from the practice of serving the meal at a high table. It was also formerly called "meat-tea". While afternoon tea became popular among the upper and middle classes during the 1860s–1870s, the working class adopted high tea, which was taken around the same time, but much heartier. This separate custom emerged due to a change in working habits. High tea was typically served after a long working day, and consists of a savoury dish (either something hot, or cold cuts of meat such as ham salad), followed by cakes and bread, butter and jam, all accompanied by tea. In The Cambridge Social History of Britain, 1750–1950, high tea is defined thus:

the central feature was the extension of a meal based predominantly on bread, butter and tea by the inclusion of some kind of fish or meat usually cooked in a frying pan.

In some parts of the United Kingdom (namely, the North of England, North and South Wales, Scotland, and some rural and working class areas of Northern Ireland), people traditionally call their midday meal dinner and their evening meal tea (served around 6 pm), whereas elsewhere people would call the midday meal lunch or luncheon and the evening meal (served after 7 pm) dinner (if formal) or supper (if informal).

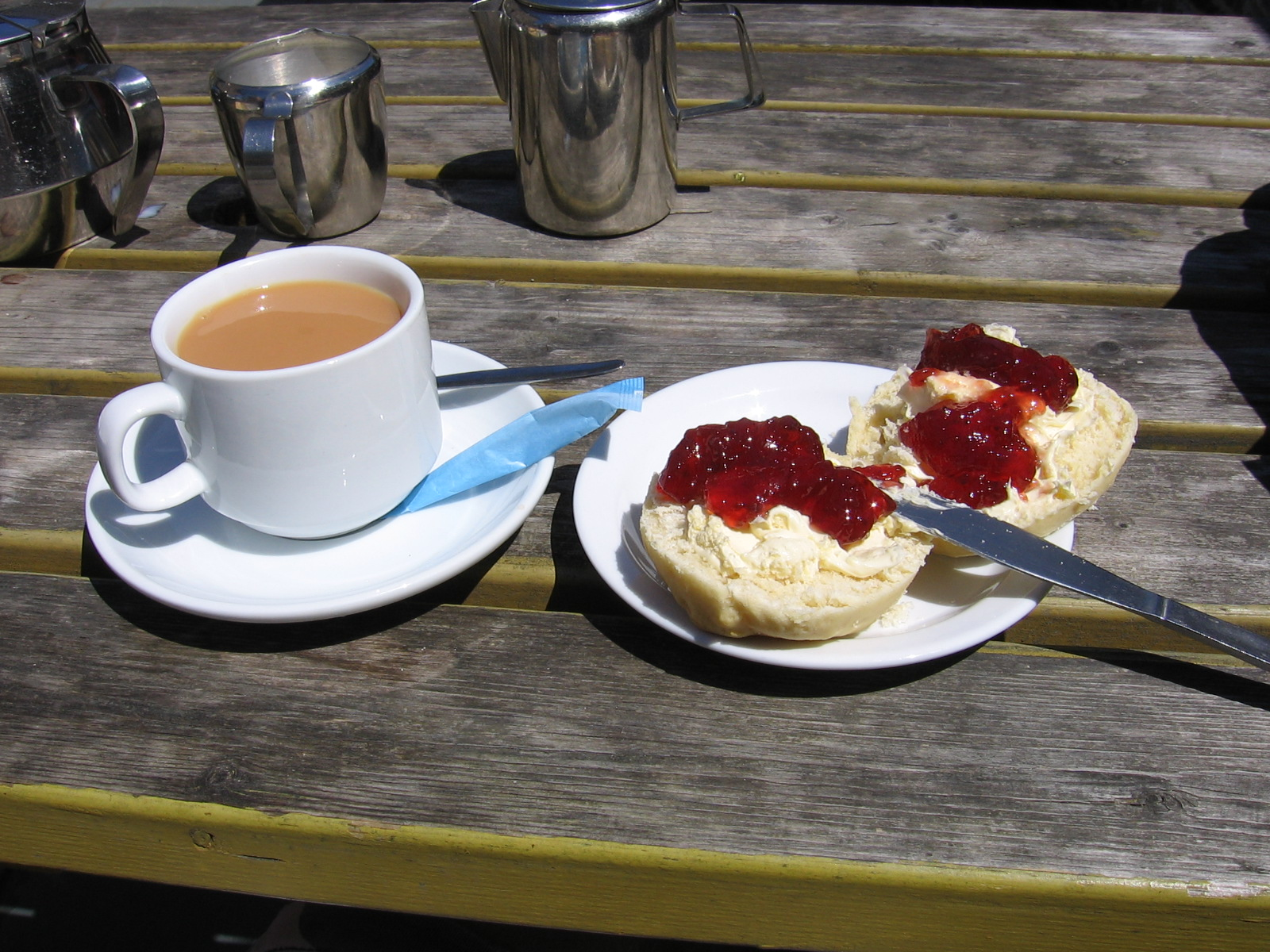
Devon cream tea, comprising tea taken with scones, clotted cream, and jam

A stereotypical expression "You'll have had your tea", meaning "I imagine you have already eaten", is used to parody people from Edinburgh as being rather stingy with hospitality. A BBC Radio 4 comedy series of this name was made by Graeme Garden and Barry Cryer.

Outside Britain, the term "high tea" is sometimes used erroneously as synonym for "afternoon tea".

== Outside Britain ==
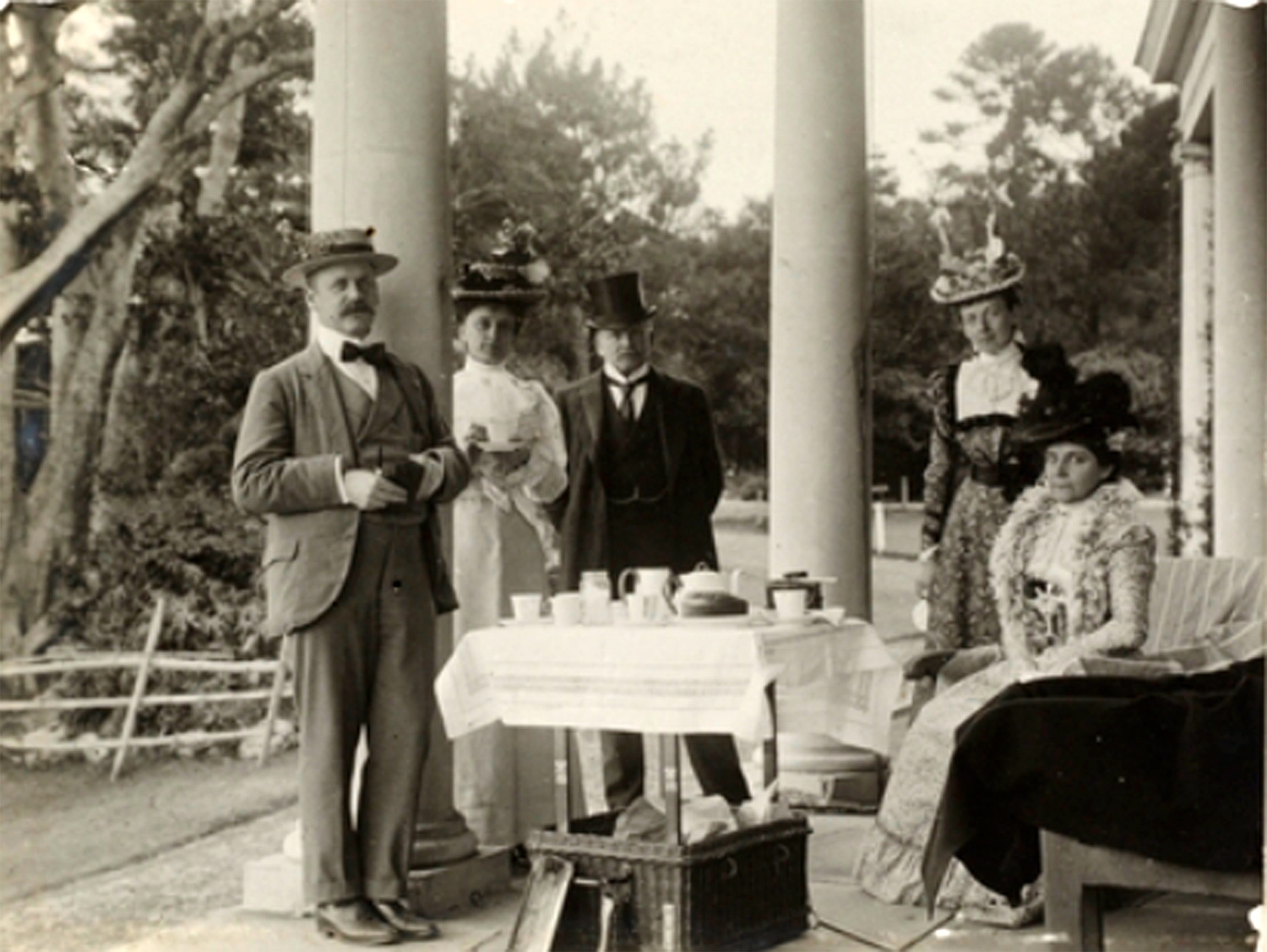
Afternoon tea at Strickland House, Vaucluse, Sydney, Australia, 1898

Afternoon tea has become a symbol of English culture. Its presence, or absence, in the former colonies of the British Empire reflects the rise and decline of English influence, as well as which traditions were valued and preserved. Britain imported goods and raw materials from its colonies, and exported its cultural traditions to them. By the end of the 19th century, colonial officials had firmly adopted afternoon tea into their routines and continued the tradition at new posts. Afternoon tea became part of the colonial legacy, rooted in many post-colonial cultures, and continues to exist in both modified and unchanged forms.

Afternoon tea became widespread in countries of the former British Empire, including Australia, Hong Kong, India, Canada, Kenya, Malta, and South Africa. The custom is also observed in society and luxury hotels in countries such as Austria, Belgium, Hungary, Greece, Denmark, Italy, Norway, Poland, Finland, Czech Republic, Sweden, and Switzerland. In Russia, the term "five o'clock tea" became a symbol of refined lifestyle and entered the vocabulary of the Russian intelligentsia in the late 19th century. Among lower social strata, afternoon tea with a samovar also became a habit.

=== Australia, New Zealand, and South Africa ===
In South Africa, New Zealand, and Australia, a small informal social gathering usually at someone's home for tea and a light meal (e.g. biscuits, scones, or slices of cake or sandwiches) in the mid-afternoon is referred to as "afternoon tea". More generally, any light meal or snack taken at mid-afternoon, with or without tea or another hot drink, may also be referred to as "afternoon tea".

When taken at mid-morning instead of mid-afternoon, the term "morning tea" is used in place of "afternoon tea" in Australia and New Zealand. These usages have declined in popularity in recent years, in tandem with the rise in coffee culture, particularly in Australia. The term high tea is now used in the southern hemisphere to describe formal afternoon teas. Formal afternoon teas are often held outside the private home in commercial tea rooms, function venues, hotels, or similar.

In Australia and New Zealand, a break from work or school taken at mid-morning is frequently known as "morning tea", and a break at mid-afternoon as "afternoon tea," both with or without the tea being drunk. A smoko, originally meaning a cigarette break, is also used as slang for a break, especially for people working in manual work.

In Australia and New Zealand, tea also refers to "dinner".

== See also ==
- History of tea
- Merienda, the Hispanic analogue
- Tea culture
- Tea dance
- Tea in the United Kingdom
- Tea lady, an employee in a hospital or place of work
- Tea set, the tea pot, sugar bowl, milk jug, etc.
- Tiffin
- Elevenses
- Palm court, a room in a hotel where tea dances took place
