= Hum To Tere Aashiq Hai =

Marathi-language comedy series

- Genre: Comedy; Drama
- Directed by: Ajay Mayekar
- Starring: See below
- Country of origin: India
- Original language: Marathi
- No. of episodes: 156

Production
- Production locations: Mumbai, Maharashtra, India
- Camera setup: Multi-camera
- Running time: 22 minutes
- Production company: Shaurya Creations

Original release
- Network: Zee Marathi
- Release: 8 November 2017 – 12 September 2018

Related
- Bhabiji Ghar Par Hain!

Hum To Tere Aashiq Hai (Devanagari: हम तो तेरे आशिक हैं; translation: We Are Your Lovers) is an Indian Marathi television-language comedy television series which aired on Zee Marathi from 8 November 2017 to 12 September 2018 in a total of 156 episodes. It is directed by Ajay Mayekar and produced by Shaurya Creations. The series stars Pushkar Shrotri, Madhavi Nimkar, Prasad Oak, and Dipti Samel Ketkar in lead roles. The story is heavily inspired by the premise of the popular Hindi series Bhabiji Ghar Par Hain!.

== Plot ==
The plot of Hum To Tere Aashiq Hai is a light-hearted situational comedy which revolves around the lives of two neighbouring couples residing in "Tanak Was" (originally "Patankar Niwas"), a fictional housing society in Thane. The husbands, Pushkar "Pushki" Gupte (Pushkar Shrotri) and Sangram Waghmare (Prasad Oak), are both polar opposites in personality and have long been married to Shalini "Shalu" (Madhavi Nimkar) and Kaveri (Dipti Samel Ketkar), respectively. The central hook of the series is that Pushki and Sangram are both bored with their respective domestic lives and thus harbour a secret infatuation with each other's wives. In their endeavour to follow the "love thy neighbour" concept, Pushki is constantly making every effort possible to impress Kaveri, while Sangram is always searching for ways to grow close to Shalu.

In the hilarious character dynamics, Sangram is a successful businessman for fruits and vegetables. He is often portrayed as a bit more boisterous, short-tempered, greedy, and "desi" young man. Often referred to as "Bhajivikya" (a slang term for someone who sells vegetables), Sangram spends most of his time managing his business. In contrast, Kaveri is a simple, traditional, gullible, and grounded young housewife. On the other hand, Pushki is the successful, sophisticated vice president of a cosmetics company. He is a significant breadwinner of the family, but is generally a more idle, soft-spoken, and egoistic young man. Often referred to as "Nalya" (a slang term for being idle), Pushki spends most of his time performing household chores. In contrast, Shalu is a glamorous, headstrong, intelligent, modern, and elegant young woman. She is passionate about running zumba classes and disapproves of her husband's laziness and ego.

The houses of both the couples are located opposite one another, and much of the plot unfolds in their respective homes. The series is filled with comedy of errors, and most episodes follow a similar pattern where one of the husbands hatches a clumsy scheme or tells a lie to either spend time with his neighbour's wife or to look like a "hero" in her eyes. Meanwhile, the other husband usually has a suspicion or tries to undermine his neighbour with his own scheme. Nevertheless, the schemes of both Pushki and Sangram unavoidably backfire, leading to public embarrassment, family misunderstandings, and slapstick humour. Despite the wandering eyes of both the husbands, the series maintains a family-friendly tone, focusing on the harmless, silly nature of Pushki and Sangram's main rivalry rather than anything serious.

== Cast ==
- Pushkar Shrotri as Pushkar Gupte (Pushki / Nalya): Shalu's husband; Sangram's rival; Kaveri's secret lover
- Madhavi Nimkar as Shalini Pushkar Gupte (Shalu): Pushki's wife; Sangram's secret love interest; Kaveri's best friend
- Prasad Oak as Sangram B. Waghmare (Sheth / Bhajivikya): Kaveri's husband; Mamanji's son; Pushki's rival; Shalu's secret lover
- Dipti Samel Ketkar as Kaveri Sangram Waghmare (Kau): Sangram's wife; Mamanji's daughter-in-law; Pushki's secret love interest; Shalu's best friend
- Madan Deodhar as Mangesh (Monty): Pinky's boyfriend; young resident of Tanak Was
- Anvita Phaltankar as Dolly: Monty's girlfriend; young resident of Tanak Was
- Umesh Bane as Vinod (Agent Vinod): mechanic and real estate agent for Tanak Was
- Satish Joshi as Damle Aajoba: elderly resident of Tanak Was

=== Cameo Appearances ===
- Sanjay Mone as Narrator in Episode 1 (voice-only)
- Sonali Khatavkar as Salesgirl at the Guptes' house in Episode 4 (Cameo Appearance)

== Adaptations ==
Language	Title	Original release	Network(s)	Last aired	Notes
Hindi	Bhabiji Ghar Par Hain! भाभीजी घर पर हैं!	2 March 2015	And TV	Ongoing	Original
Tamil	Darling Darling டார்லிங் டார்லிங்	12 December 2016	Zee Tamil	10 June 2017	Remake
Marathi	Hum To Tere Aashiq Hai हम तो तेरे आशिक हैं	8 November 2017	Zee Marathi	12 September 2018	Remake
