= Pudhcha Paaul =

Indian television series

- Genre: Soap opera
- Directed by: Harshad Paranjape; Kedar Vaidya; Vaibhav Chinchalkar
- Starring: see below
- Theme music composer: Nilesh Moharir
- Opening theme: "Pudhcha Paaul" by Bela Shende and Nihira Joshi
- Country of origin: India
- Original language: Marathi
- No. of episodes: 1944

Production
- Producers: Peter Gundra; Vidhyadhar Pathare
- Production locations: Gemini Studio, Kolhapur, Maharashtra
- Editors: Sachin Randive; Aseem Momin
- Camera setup: Multi-camera
- Running time: 22 minutes
- Production company: Iris Productions

Original release
- Network: Star Pravah
- Release: 2 May 2011 – 1 July 2017

Related
- Saath Nibhaana Saathiya

Pudhcha Paaul (transl. The Next Step) is an Indian Marathi soap opera that aired on Star Pravah. It is an official remake of Hindi television serial Saath Nibhaana Saathiya of StarPlus. It premiered on 2 May 2011 and stopped on 1 July 2017 completing 1944 episodes. It is one of the longest-running Marathi television series and Star Pravah's longest-running series also.

== Premises ==
Kalyani is a simple naive girl. She married in the Sardeshmukh family where she develops a bitter-sweet relation with her mother-in-law Rajlaxmi, the stern matriarch of the family. Rajlaxmi makes Kalyani dance to her tunes. The story progresses as Rajlaxmi turns mentor to Kalyani.

== Plot ==
The story revolves around a simple innocent orphaned village girl named Kalyani. She does all the household work yet her aunt Kanchanmala and her cousin Rupali who cannot tolerate her, so they torture her daily. She is illiterate and they do not allow her to take any education. One day Rajalaxmi (aka Akkasaheb) Sardeshmukh comes to their home with his son Soham for marriage of Rupali with Soham. However, Soham was already with another girl. But instead of Rupali she likes Kalyani and decides to make the latter her daughter-in-law, going against the wishes of her son.

Later both Kalyani and Rupali are married to Soham and Rohit (Soham's cousin) respectively. Rupali is jealous of Kalyani as she failed to become elder daughter-in-law of Sardeshmukh mansion which may deprive her of inheriting the property of the Sardeshmukh family. She, along with the evil plans of her mother Kanchanmala creates problems in Kalyani's life and tries to kill her. With all of these troubles on her shoulder, Kalyani completes all of her duties and wins all other family member's hearts. Later Soham also coming out from his past, falls in love with Kalyani and accepts her as his wife. In all the troubles Rajalaxmi supports her as her own daughter making an inherent bond between a mother-in-law and daughter-in-law.

Taking the opportunity of brother's death Soham's ex-girlfriend comes again in Soham and Kalyani's married life to make Kalyani's life hell. She pretends as mentally unstable and innocent Kalyani takes her in Sardeshmukh mansion going against everyone's decision. Soham's ex now makes problems to kick Kalyani out of the house and to bring back Soham again in her life.

== Cast ==
=== Main ===
- Jui Gadkari as Kalyani Sardeshmukh – Kanchanmala's niece; Rupali's cousin; Soham's ex-wife; Sameer's wife; Karan's mother
- Harshada Khanvilkar as Rajlaxmi (Akkasaheb) Sardeshmukh – Jaywantrao's wife; Soham and Sameer's mother; Karan's grandmother

=== Recurring ===
- Sangram Samel as Sameer Sardeshmukh – Rajlaxmi and Jaywantrao's younger son; Madhukar's adoptive son; Soham's brother; Kalyani's second husband; Karan's adoptive father
- Aryan Devgiri as Karan Sardeshmukh – Kalyani and Soham's son; Sameer's adoptive son
- Madhuri Desai as New Kalyani
- Sharmila Shinde as Rupali Randive Sardeshmukh – Kanchanmala's daughter; Kalyani's cousin; Rohit's wife; Chakuli's mother
- Suyash Tilak / Abhijeet Kelkar as Rohit Sardeshmukh – Devaki and Yashwant's son; Soham and Sameer's cousin; Rupali's husband; Chakuli's father
- Aastad Kale as Soham Sardeshmukh – Rajlaxmi and Jaywantrao's elder son; Sameer's brother; Kalyani's ex-husband; Swapnali's husband; Karan's father
- Swapnali Patil as Swapnali Sardeshmukh – Soham's widow; Bunty's wife
- Radhika Harshe / Supriya Pathare as Kanchanmala Randive – Chintamani's sister; Rupali's mother; Kalyani's aunt
- Ajinkya Joshi as Chintamani – Kanchanmala's brother; Kalyani and Rupali's uncle
- Milind Safai as Jaywantrao Sardeshmukh – Yashwant's brother; Rajlaxmi's husband; Soham and Sameer's father; Karan's grandfather
- Mrunal Deshpande as Devaki Sardeshmukh – Yashwant's wife; Rohit's mother; Chakuli's grandmother
- Shrirang Deshmukh as Yashwant Sardeshmukh – Jaywantrao's brother; Devaki's husband; Rohit's father; Chakuli's grandfather
- Pradeep Velankar as Dadasaheb Sardeshmukh – Yashwant and Jaywant's father
- Tarka pednekar as Pooja rajlaxmi daughter
- Sonali Naik as Kaveri Jaywant Sardeshmukh
- Tejashree Dharne as Sayali Pradhan
- Rashmi Anpat as Aishwarya Karan wife
- Prasad limaye as Karan Sardeshmukh
- Atisha Naik
- Bharati Achrekar as Kusum
- Madhavi Nimkar as Shweta
- Avinash Narkar as Madhukar; Sameers adoptive father
- Samidha Guru as Poornima
- Aarti More as Teju
- Ketaki Palav as Inspector Divya
- Samruddhi kelkar
- Vidya karanjakar as sujata Deshpande
- Swati deval as Priti Deshpande
- Swati borkar as shakuntala
- Rutuja Bagwe as minakshi sameer business partner
- Veena Jagtap as fake shreya ep 1061
- Ashok shinde as Aniket

== Adaptations ==
| Language | Title | Original release | Network(s) | Last aired | Notes |
|---|---|---|---|---|---|
| Hindi | Saath Nibhaana Saathiya साथ निभाना साथिया | 3 May 2010 | StarPlus | 23 July 2017 | Original |
| Marathi | Pudhcha Paaul पुढचं पाऊल | 2 May 2011 | Star Pravah | 30 June 2017 | Remake |
| Tamil | Deivam Thandha Veedu தெய்வம் தந்த வீடு | 15 July 2013 | Star Vijay | 26 May 2017 | Remake |
| Malayalam | Chandanamazha ചന്ദനമഴ | 3 February 2014 | Asianet | 9 December 2017 | Remake |
| Bengali | Bodhuboron বধুবরন | 19 August 2013 | Star Jalsha | 29 January 2017 | Remake |
| Telugu | Intiki Deepam Illalu ఇంటికి దీపం ఇల్లాలు | 8 March 2021 | Star Maa | 9 September 2023 | Remake |

== Reception ==
In June 2011, it was the most watched Marathi serial with 3.8 TVR. In week 5 of 2012, it gained 4.1 TVR fetching second position. In week 13 of 2012, it garnered 4.2 TVR maintaining its top position. In May 2012, it garnered 3.9 TVR with gaining second position.

=== Ratings ===
| Week | Year | TAM TVR | Rank | | Ref. |
| Week | Year | TAM TVR | Mah/Goa | All India | Ref. |
|---|---|---|---|---|---|
| Week 26 | 2011 | 0.97 | 1 | 63 | |
| Week 43 | 2011 | 0.85 | 1 | 77 | |
| Week 46 | 2011 | 0.75 | 3 | 84 | |
| Week 49 | 2011 | 0.76 | 3 | 84 | |
| Week 12 | 2012 | 0.89 | 1 | 64 | |
| Week 15 | 2012 | 0.95 | 1 | 60 | |
| Week 16 | 2012 | 0.92 | 1 | 65 | |
| Week 17 | 2012 | 0.84 | 3 | 77 | |
| Week 19 | 2012 | 0.93 | 2 | 66 | |
| Week 21 | 2012 | 0.88 | 2 | 62 | |
| Week 22 | 2012 | 1.07 | 2 | 48 | |
