= Elegance =

Conceptual beauty that shows unusual effectiveness and simplicity

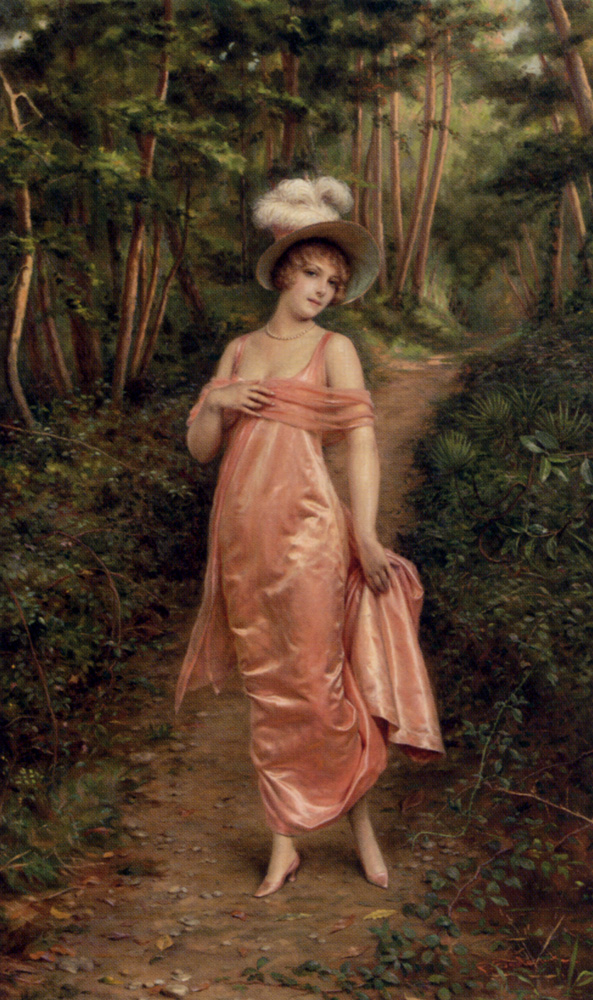
Elegance of the Epoque by Frédéric Soulacroix

An example of "beauty in method"—a simple and elegant proof of the Pythagorean theorem.

Elegance is beauty that shows unusual effectiveness and simplicity.

Elegance is frequently used as a standard of tastefulness, particularly in visual design, decorative arts, literature, science, and the aesthetics of mathematics.

Elegant things often exhibit refined grace and suggest maturity, and in the case of mathematics, a deep mastery of the subject matter.

== General concept ==
Essential components of the concept include simplicity and consistency of design, focusing on the essential features of an object. In art of any kind one might also require dignified grace, or restrained beauty of style.

Visual stimuli are frequently considered elegant, if a small number of colors and stimuli are used, emphasizing the remainder.

== In philosophy of science ==
In the philosophy of science, there are two concepts referring to two aspects of simplicity: elegance (syntactic simplicity), which means the number and complexity of hypotheses, and parsimony (ontological simplicity), which is the number and complexity of things postulated.

== In mathematics ==
In mathematical problem solving, the solution to a problem (such as a proof of a mathematical theorem) exhibits mathematical elegance if it is surprisingly simple and insightful yet effective and constructive. Such solutions might involve a minimal amount of assumptions and computations, while outlining an approach that is highly generalizable. Similarly, a computer program or algorithm is elegant if it uses a small amount of code to great effect.

== In engineering ==
In engineering, a solution may be considered elegant if it uses a non-obvious method to produce a solution which is highly effective and simple. An elegant solution may solve multiple problems at once, especially problems that are not thought to be inter-related. Elegance can arguably be measured for engineering problems as the ratio of problem complexity to that of solution complexity. Thus a simple (low complexity) solution to a problem of high complexity is seen as elegant. This measure does not advise of process to produce elegant solutions, and is merely a way of comparing between multiple solutions for elegance assessment.

== In chemistry ==
In chemistry, chemists might look for elegance in theory, method, technique and procedure. For example, elegance might comprise creative parsimony and versatility in the utilization of resources, in the manipulation of materials, and in the effectiveness in syntheses and analysis.

== In pharmacy ==
In pharmacy, elegance in formulation is important for quality as well as for effectiveness in dosage form design, a major component of pharmaceuticals.

== In fashion ==
The concept of elegance in fashion is often associated with the modern taste for subtraction and understatement that capitalistic societies have developed to convey a sense of status. Unlike similar concepts such as glamour, elegance is a unisex practice, and it was initially developed amongst the male ruling classes after the French Revolution. Elegance was later adopted by ladieswear, from the 20th century onwards. This approach to clothes based on subtraction and understatement is pursued by the upper classes to avoid vulgarity, hence belonging to a lower social status. Several elements that determine the adoption of elegance and its rule have been recognized: a key role is played by class, gender, morality and taste.
