= Madhavi Nimkar =

Marathi actress

Madhavi Nemkar
- Born: 17 May 1984 (age 41); Khopoli, India
- Occupation: Actress
- Years active: 2004–present
- Spouse: Vikrant Kulkarni (m. 2014)
- Children: Ruben Kulkarni

Madhvi Nemkar (born 17 May 1984) is a Marathi actress. She is well known for her villainous roles, including playing Shalini in Sukh Mhanje Nakki Kay Asta! and Hum To Tere Aashiq Hai.

== Early career ==
Nemkar's journey in the entertainment industry began when she accompanied her cousin, Sonali Khare, to ETV's office. It was there that Santosh Ayachit spotted her and offered her the opportunity to host the show Gaane Tumche Aamche on channel ETV Marathi. This marked her debut project and paved the way for her future endeavors.

== Acting career ==
Nemkar initially ventured into acting through theater, starring in plays such as Shahanyani Khave Basun, Surakshit Antar Theva (for which she received awards for Best Supporting Actress), Baykochya Nakalat, Pehchan Kaun, and Get Well Soon.

She transitioned to television, captivating audiences with her performances in popular serials like Swapnanchya Palikadle, Agnishikha, Hya Gojirwanya Gharat, Jawai Vikat Ghene Aahe and Kunku. Additionally, she appeared in serials like Goshta Eka Collegechi, Oon Paaus and Anamika.

Nemkar also made notable cameo appearances, including one in Zee Marathi's acclaimed show Majhya Navaryachi Bayko. She also played a vamp in famous serials like Pudhcha Paaul and Swapnanchya Palikadle. She is currently seen in Sukh Mhanje Nakki Kay Asta playing a vamp role named Shalini. She also received an award for this character as Best Negative Character.

== Filmography ==
=== Films ===
Year	Title	Role	Notes
2009	Baykocha Nakalatach		Debut film
2010	Asa Mee Tasa Mee	Saraswati Salunkhe	
2011	Dhava Dhav	Hema	
2011	Sagla Karun Bhagle	Sarita	
2014	Sangharsh	Radhika	
2022	Pawankhind	Gautamabai Deshpande	
2022	Sher Shivraj	Soyarabai	

=== Television ===
Year	Title	Role	Channel	Ref.
2004	Gaane Tumache Amache	Host	ETV Marathi	
2005-2006	Oon Paaus	Madhavi	Zee Marathi	
2006-2009	Char Divas Sasuche	Prajakta	ETV Marathi	
2009-2010	Kunku	Vanita	Zee Marathi	
2011	Pudhcha Paaul	Shweta	Star Pravah	
2011-2014	Swapnanchya Palikadle	Anvita Patkar	Star Pravah	
2014-2015	Jawai Vikat Ghene Aahe	Mukund's wife	Zee Marathi	
2017	Majhya Navaryachi Bayko	Devika	Zee Marathi	
2017-2018	Hum To Tere Aashiq Hai	Shalini Gupte	Zee Marathi	
2020	The Raikar Case	Sonia Mehra	Voot	
2020-2024	Sukh Mhanje Nakki Kay Asta!	Shalini Shirke-Patil	Star Pravah	
