= Tharala Tar Mag! =

2022 Indian Marathi language TV series

- Genre: Drama
- Written by: Ashwini Snehal Ramesh
- Directed by: Sachin Gokhale
- Starring: See below
- Theme music composer: Nilesh Moharir
- Opening theme: "Tharala Tar Mag" by Hrishikesh Ranade and Priyanka Barve
- Country of origin: India
- Original language: Marathi
- No. of episodes: 1338

Production
- Producers: Aadesh Bandekar; Suchitra Bandekar
- Production locations: Mumbai, Maharashtra
- Cinematography: Vinayak Jadhav
- Editor: Narpat Choudhari
- Camera setup: Multi-camera
- Running time: 22 minutes
- Production company: Soham Productions

Original release
- Network: Star Pravah
- Release: 5 December 2022 – present

Related
- Roja

Tharala Tar Mag! (transl. It Is Decided!) is an Indian Marathi language soap opera airing on Star Pravah that premiered from 5 December 2022. It is an official remake of Tamil TV series Roja. It is directed by Sachin Gokhale, Written by Ashwini Snehal Ramesh and produced by Aadesh Bandekar and Suchitra Bandekar under the banner of Soham Productions.

== Plot ==
It follows an optimistic girl who was raised in an orphanage. She meets her biological father Raviraj, but they are unaware of each other's identities. Sayali alias Tanvi, is grown in orphanage and has a sweet, kind disposition. Arjun, humble despite his wealth, is a leading criminal lawyer. Sayali is looking for a lawyer to argue in a case related to Madhubhau, who was falsely accused and arrested for Vilas' murder which was done by Sakshi with Priya by her side.

Arjun's family had planned his engagement with Priya (masquerading as "Fake Tanvi"). But Arjun loathed love and marriage because of his traumatic past, including Sakshi's betrayal of Arjun's friend's death. In particular, he had no desire to marry Priya. So, Arjun agrees to take up Sayali's case on the condition that she would agree to one-year contract marriage with him. After she agrees, the two go to the temple on Arjun's engagement day. After registering the marriage, Arjun and Sayali reach the engagement venue, and Arjun announces his marriage to Sayali to his family, thereby stopping the engagement. Sayali goes to Arjun's house and they pretend to be husband and wife in front of the family. Meanwhile, Priya, Sakshi Shikhare, her father Mahipat and Raviraj's brother Nagraj plot against Sayali and Arjun to make them cease the Madhubhau case.In this process it is revealed that Nagraj had arranged for Mahipat to kill Raviraj, Pratima and Tanvi years ago in a fake accident. On the other hand Arjun and Sayali keep up their facade of a couple in love, but do not have feelings for each other. However, with time, Arjun discovers her good qualities and falls in love with her. The family starts admiring Sayali's qualities which are similar to Pratima, but then Sayali gets stabbed on Visarjan day as per the villains' plan. Arjun takes her to hospital and Pratima donates blood to her, unbeknownst to the family. Asmita and Priya create a trap for Arjun-Sayali by changing Sayali's reports claiming her pregnancy while shes's not. Sayali feels Pratima's presence during Laxmi Poojan. Sayali gets impressed by arjun when he brings Madhubhau on Padva. Sayali helps Arjun regain trust on marriage and love through her actions and he develops strong feelings for her which he can't express.

== Cast ==
=== Main ===
- Jui Gadkari as Sayali Subhedar (née Killedar / foster née Patil); Arjun's wife; Madhukar's adopted/foster daughter; Raviraj and Pratima's biological daughter (Real Tanvi Killedar); Kalpana and Pratap's daughter-in-law, Asmita and Ashwin's sister-in-law; Annapurna's granddaughter (2022–present)
- Amit Bhanushali as Arjun Subhedar; A criminal lawyer; Sayali's husband; Kalpana and Pratap's son; Asmita and Ashwin's brother; Raviraj and Pratima's son-in-law; Annapurna's grandson (2022–present)

=== Recurring ===
Subhedar family

- Jyoti Chandekar / Rohini Hattangadi as Annapurna Subhedar; A Chief Minister; Pratap’s mother and Pratima's foster mother; Kalpana's mother-in-law; Tanvi's grandmother-in-law; Asmita, Arjun and Ashwin's grandmother (2022–2025) (2025 - present)
- Atul Mahajan as Pratap Subhedar; Annapurna's son; Kalpana's husband; Asmita, Arjun and Ashwin's father; Sachin, Sayali and Priya's father-in-law; Pratima's foster brother (2022–present)
- Prajakta Dighe-Kulkarni as Kalpana Subhedar; Pratap's wife; Asmita, Arjun and Ashwin's mother; Sachin, Sayali and Priya's mother-in-law; Annapurna's daughter-in-law (2022–present)
- Monika Dabade as Asmita Dixit (née Subhedar); Sachin's wife; Pratap and Kalpana's elder daughter; Arjun and Ashwin's elder sister; Sayali's sister-in-law; Annapurna's granddaughter (2022–present)
- Nakul Ghanekar as Sachin Dixit; Asmita's husband; Sayali, Arjun and Ashwin's brother-in-law; Kalpana and Pratap's son-in-law (2025–present)
- Pratik Suresh as Dr. Ashwin Subhedar; A doctor; Priya's husband; Asmita and Arjun's younger brother; Kalpana and Pratap's younger son; Annapurna's grandson (2022–present)
- Priya Tendolkar as Priya Subhedar (née Lokhande); Ashwin's wife; Mainavati and Sadashiv's daughter; Sakshi's friend; Fake Tanvi (2022–present)

Killedar family

- Sagar Talashikar as Raviraj Killedar; A lawyer; Pratima's husband; Tanvi's father; Asmita, Arjun and Ashwin's uncle; Annapurna's foster son-in-law; Nagraj's brother (2022–present)
- Shilpa Navalkar as Pratima Killedar (née Subhedar); Raviraj's wife; Pratap's younger foster sister; Annapurna's foster daughter; Tanvi's mother; Asmita, Arjun and Ashwin's aunt (2022–present)
- Dnyanesh Wadekar as Nagraj Killedar; Raviraj's brother; Suman's husband; Rakesh's father; Tanvi's uncle (2022–present)
- Shraddha Ketkar-Vartak as Suman Killedar; Nagraj's wife; Rakesh's mother; Tanvi's aunt (2022–present)
- Apoorva Ranjankar / Suprit Kadam as Rakesh Killedar; Suman and Nagraj's son; Tanvi's cousin (2022–2023) (2026 - present)

Lokhande family

- Rajan Joshi as Sadashiv Lokhande; Priya's father; Mainavati's husband (2025–2026)
- Kirti Pendharkar as Mainavati Lokhande; Priya's mother; Sadashiv's wife (2025–2026)

Shikhre family

- Madhav Abhyankar / Mayur Khandge as Mahipat Shikhre (2022–2023) (2023- present)
- Mira Jagannath / Ketaki Palav / Sanchita Kulkarni as Sakshi Shikhre (Shweta (fake identity)); Mahipat's daughter (2022–2023) (2023-2026)(2026-present)

==== Others ====
- Narayan Jadhav as Madhukar Patil; Sayali's adoptive/foster father (2022–present)
- Chaitanya Sardeshpande as Chaitanya Gadkari; Arjun's best friend and lawyer criminal boss (2022–present)
- Disha Danade as Kusum Raut (2022–present)
- Kshitee Jog as Advocate Damini Deshmukh (2025)
- Ruchira Jadhav as Manasi; A lawyer and Arjun's childhood friend (2023)
- Mayuri Mohite as Vimal (2022–present)

== Production ==
Jui Gadkari returned to the Star Pravah after a hiatus of seven years to take on the role of Sayali Patil, the female lead. Amit Bhanushali returned to the screen after a hiatus of nine years to the play the lead role of Arjun Subhedar. The duo have become one of the most popular onscreen couples in the Marathi television industry.

== Adaptations ==
| Language | Title | Original release | Network(s) | Last aired | Notes | Ref. |
|---|---|---|---|---|---|---|
| Tamil | Roja ரோஜா | 9 April 2018 | Sun TV | 3 December 2022 | Original | |
| Kannada | Sevanthi ಸೇವಂತಿ | 25 February 2019 | Udaya TV | Ongoing | Remake | |
| Telugu | Roja రోజా | 11 March 2019 | Gemini TV | 27 March 2020 | Remake | |
| Hindi | Sindoor Ki Keemat सिंदूर की कीमत | 18 October 2021 | Dangal TV | 29 April 2023 | Remake | |
| Malayalam | Kaliveedu കളിവീട് | 15 November 2021 | Surya TV | 22 September 2024 | Remake | |
| Bengali | Saathi সাথী | 7 February 2022 | Sun Bangla | 3 August 2024 | Remake | |
