= Jui Gadkari =

Indian television actress

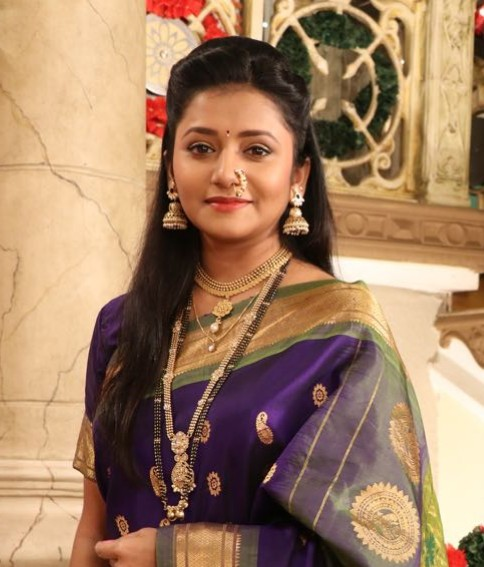
- On the set of Pudhcha Paaul
- Born: 8 July 1988 (age 38); Karjat, Maharashtra, India
- Occupation: Actress
- Years active: 2010 - present
- Known for: Pudhcha Paaul; Bigg Boss Marathi 1

Jui Gadkari is an Indian actress who mainly works in Marathi language television She is known for her show Pudhcha Paaul , Tharla Tar Mag and being contestant of Bigg Boss Marathi 1.

== Early life ==
Gadkari was born on 8 July 1988 in Karjat, Maharashtra to a Marathi-speaking CKP family. Her father is a playwright and rhythmist. She is the great grand-daughter of Ram Ganesh Gadkari. She had confirmed that she suffered from prolactinoma and rheumatoid arthritis.

== Career ==
Gadkari started her career as assistant director in white paper communications. She made her debut with the show Shrimant Peshwa Bajirao Mastani in the year 2009, playing the role of Chanda. She also appeared in Maziya Priyala Preet Kalena and Tujvin Sakhya Re.

In 2011, she portrayed the role of Kalyani Sardeshmukh in Star Pravah's Pudhcha Paaul which ended in 2017. In 2017, she appeared in Colors Marathi's Saraswati as Devika. In 2018, she participated in Marathi reality show Bigg Boss Marathi 1 as a contestant; she was evicted on Day 49. After that show, she played a lead role in Vartul.

In 2020, she appeared in Sony Marathi's Singing Star as a contestant. Currently, she plays a lead role in Star Pravah's Tharla Tar Mag as Sayali.

== Personal life ==
Jui is in a long term relationship with her Pudhcha Paaul co-actor Prasad Limaye since 2011.

== Television ==
Year	Show	Role	Channel	Notes
2010	Shrimat Peshwa Bajirao Mastani	Chanda	ETV Marathi	Debut series
2010	Maziya Priyala Preet Kalena	Soniya	Zee Marathi	
2011	Tujvin Sakhya Re	Lavanya	Star Pravah	Negative role
2011-2017	Pudhcha Paaul	Kalyani Sardeshmukh	Star Pravah	
2017	Saraswati	Devika	Colors Marathi	
2018	Bigg Boss Marathi 1	Contestant	Colors Marathi	Evicted on day 49
2018-2019	Vartul	Meenakshi	Zee Yuva	
2020	Singing Star	Contestant	Sony Marathi	
2022-present	Tharala Tar Mag!	Sayali Subhedar	Star Pravah	Protagonist

== Accolades ==
Year	Award	Category	Series	Result
2012	Maharashtra Times Sanman Awards	Best Actress in a Leading Role	Pudhcha Paaul	Nominated
2012	Sanskruti Kaladarpan	Best Actress	Pudhcha Paaul	Nominated
2023	6th Majja Digital Awards	Outstanding Lead Actor in a Drama Series (Female)	Tharala Tar Mag!	Won
2024	Star Pravah Parivar Puraskar	Best Debut Female	Tharala Tar Mag!	
2024	Star Pravah Parivar Puraskar	Best Debut Female	Tharala Tar Mag!	Won
2025	Star Pravah Parivar Puraskar	Best Debut Female	Tharala Tar Mag!	
