= Sagla Karun Bhagle =

Sagla Karun Bhagle - Marathi Movie
- Theatrical release poster
- Directed by: Vijay Patkar
- Produced by: Saurabh Kulkarni
- Starring: Makarand Anaspure; Deepali Sayyad; Sweta Mehendale; Madhavi Nimkar; Chetan Dalvi; Sahil Yeolekar
- Music by: Nitin Hivarkar
- Release date: 2 December 2011
- Country: India
- Language: Marathi

Sagla Karun Bhagle is a Marathi movie released on 2 December 2011. Produced by Saurabh Kulkarni and directed by Vijay Patkar.

== Soundtrack ==
The music is provided by Nitin Hivarkar.
