= Pallobi Sharma =

Indian Bengali actress

- Born: 4 September; Howrah, West Bengal, India
- Citizenship: Indian
- Occupation: Actress
- Years active: 2012—present
- Notable work: Ke Apon Ke Por; Neem Phooler Madhu

Pallobi Sharma (Bengali: পল্লবী শর্মা; born 4 September) is an Indian actress who primarily works in Bengali television. She is known for playing lead roles in the television series Nader Nimai, Dui Prithibi, Ke Apon Ke Por, Neem Phooler Madhu, and Tare Dhori Dhori Mone Kori.

== Career ==
Pallobi made her acting debut with the Sananda TV series Nader Nemai, portraying Laxmipriya. She later appeared in the ETV Bangla series Dui Prithibi.

In 2016, she played Joba in the Star Jalsha series Ke Apon Ke Por. In 2022, she portrayed Parna in the Zee Bangla series Neem Phooler Madhu. Since 2025, she has been portraying the roles of Rupmanjari, Adwitiya or Diti in the Zee Bangla series Tare Dhori Dhori Mone Kori.

== Television ==
Year	Title	Role	Character	Channel	Notes
2011	Nader Nimai		Laxmipriya	Sananda TV	
2014	Dui Prithibi		Indu	ETV Bangla	
2016-2020	Ke Apon Ke Por	Lead Role	Advocate Joba Sengupta (née Basu)	Star Jalsha	
2021	Mahapeeth Tarapeeth	Supporting Role	Kamala	Star Jalsha	
2022-2025	Neem Phooler Madhu	Lead Role	Alokparna "Parna" Dutta (née Basu)	Zee Bangla	
2025-Present	Taare Dhori Dhori Mone Kori	Lead Role	Roopmanjuri "Roop" Goswami (deceased) / Adwitiya "Dwiti" Goswami (dual role)	Zee Bangla	

=== Mahalaya ===
Year	Title	Channel	Role	Ref(s)
2023	Nobopotrikaye Debiboron	Zee Bangla	Devi Kartiki	
2024	Nabarupe Devi Durga	Zee Bangla	Devi Katyayani	
2026	Asubhanashini Trinayani	Zee Bangla	Devi Skandamata	
