= Sukh Mhanje Nakki Kay Asta! =

2020 Indian Marathi-language TV series

- Genre: Drama
- Written by: Abhijeet Guru
- Directed by: Chandrakant Kanse
- Starring: See below
- Theme music composer: Pankaj Padghan
- Opening theme: "Sukh Mhanje Nakki Kay Asta!" by Kartiki Gaikwad
- Country of origin: India
- Original language: Marathi
- No. of seasons: 2
- No. of episodes: 1261

Production
- Producers: Mahesh Kothare; Adinath Kothare
- Production location: Mumbai
- Camera setup: Multi-camera
- Running time: 22 minutes
- Production company: Kothare Vision

Original release
- Network: Star Pravah
- Release: 17 August 2020 – 22 December 2024

Related
- Ke Apon Ke Por

Sukh Mhanje Nakki Kay Asta! (transl. What Exactly Is Happiness!) is an Indian Marathi language television fantasy drama series airing on Star Pravah. It premiered on 17 August 2020 and ended on 22 December 2024. It was produced by Mahesh Kothare and Adinath Kothare under the banner of Kothare Vision. The series is loosely based on Bengali TV series Ke Apon Ke Por. It stars Mandar Jadhav and Girija Prabhu in lead roles.

== Plot ==
In Kolhapur, Gauri, a kind hearted girl, is treated as a daughter by Shirke-Patil family patriarch, Yashwant and his wife, Nandini. But, she is constantly berated and ill-treated by other members of the family, especially Shirke-Patil's eldest daughter-in-law, Shalini, who sees Gauri as mere a servant, while her husband, Malhar, sympathises with Gauri. Shirke-Patil's youngest son, Jaydeep returns from London and strives to keep the family united. He is forced to marry Gauri to protect her honour.

Eventually, love blooms between Gauri and Jaydeep. Later, it's revealed that Jaydeep is Surya and his wife, Mangal's son while Gauri is Yashwant and Nandini's daughter. At birth, Gauri was presumed dead and hence Surya has exchanged both kids. Yashwant and Nandini accept both Gauri and Jaydeep as their own children.

Later, Gauri and Jaydeep have a daughter, Lakshmi. Fearing that Shalini might harm Lakshmi, Jaydeep leaves the house with Lakshmi as Gauri refuses to believe him. They are assumed to be dead in a bus accident.

6 years later, Gauri is still in hope for Jaydeep and Lakshmi's return while Shalini has taken over the Shirke-Patil house. Jaydeep lives with Lakshmi in Pune. Eventually, Gauri and Jaydeep reunite and manage to take the house back from Shalini. Later, Shalini tricks and kills Gauri and Jaydeep, along with other family members, except Nandini and Lakshmi.

25 years later, Gauri and Jaydeep are reborn as Nitya and Adhiraj, having opposite personalities to their past lives. Nandini is still in hope for Jaydeep and Gauri's return. Having memory loss and also being mute, Lakshmi lives as Rajma with Anna, who has taken care of her.

Eventually, Nitya and Adhiraj become friends and get married. Lakshmi regains her voice and memory and reunites with Nandini. Nitya and Adhiraj remember their past lives and reunite with Nandini and Lakshmi. Shalini returns and kills Nandini. Then after, with the help of Shirke-Patil family, Nitya and Adhiraj seek the blessing of Devi Aai and then kills Shalini.

8 months later, it's revealed that Nitya and Adhiraj have a daughter named Nandini, named after Gauri/Nitya's mother Nandini Shirke-Patil.

== Cast ==
=== Main ===
- Girija Prabhu as
  - Gauri Jaydeep Shinde (née Shirke-Patil) – Yashwant and Nandini's younger daughter; Suryakant and Mangal's foster daughter; Malhar, Renuka and Uday's sister; Jaydeep's wife; Lakshmi's mother.
  - Nitya Adhiraj Jadhav (née Adhikari) – Reborn Gauri; Revati and Sudarshan's daughter; Adhiraj's wife; Jr. Nandini's mother; Ishan's former love interest and ex-fiancé; Lovely, Santya and Sawari's friend.
    - Geeta – Fake Identity.
- Mandar Jadhav as
  - Jaydeep Suryakant Shinde – Suryakant and Mangal's son; Yashwant and Nandini's foster son; Malhar, Renuka and Uday's foster brother; Gauri's husband; Lakshmi's father.
  - Adhiraj Mukund Jadhav – Reborn Jaydeep; Mukund and Vimal's son; Sawari's brother; Nitya's husband; Jr. Nandini's father; Pawani's former love interest; Lovely and Santya's friend.
    - Jaywant Deshmukh – Fake Identity.

=== Recurring ===
- Mrunmayee Gondhalekar as Lakshmi "Rajma" Shinde – Gauri and Jaydeep's daughter; Jr. Nandini's elder sister; Krish and Kashish's cousin.
  - Saisha Salvi as Child Lakshmi Shinde.
    - Arpeet Hase as Baby Lakshmi Shinde.
- Varsha Usgaonkar as Nandini "Maai" Shirke-Patil – Yashwant's widow; Malhar, Renuka, Uday and Gauri's mother; Jaydeep's foster mother; Krish, Kashish and Lakshmi's grandmother.
- Sunil Godse as Yashwant "Dada" Shirke-Patil – Nandini's husband; Malhar, Renuka, Uday and Gauri's father; Jaydeep's foster father; Krish, Kashish and Lakshmi's grandfather.
- Kapil Honrao as Malhar Shirke-Patil – Yashwant and Nandini's elder son; Renuka, Uday and Gauri's brother; Jaydeep's foster brother; Shalini's husband.
- Madhavi Nimkar as Shalini Shirke-Patil – Rahul's sister; Malhar's widow; Gauri and Jaydeep's rival; Shirke-Patil's murderer; Revati's friend and business partner.
- Vikas Patil as Rahul Desai – Shalini's brother; Jaydeep and Gauri's arch rival; Shalini, Devki and Uday's partner-in-crime.
- Sanjay Patil as Uday Shirke-Patil – Yashwant and Nandini's younger son; Malhar, Renuka and Gauri's brother; Jaydeep's foster brother; Devki's husband; Krish and Kashish's father.
- Meenakshi Rathod / Bhakti Ratnaparkhi as Devki Shirke-Patil – Anil's sister; Uday's wife; Krish and Kashish's mother.
- Abhishek Gaonkar as Anil "Bracket" Jadhav – Devki's brother; Jaydeep and Gauri's arch rival; Shalini, Devki and Uday's partner-in-crime.
- Aparna Gokhale as Renuka Shirke-Patil Pawar – Yashwant and Nandini's elder daughter; Malhar, Uday and Gauri's sister; Jaydeep's foster sister; Shekhar's wife.
- Ganesh Revdekar as Shekhar Pawar – Renuka's Widower; Gauri and Jaydeep's brother-figure and well-wisher.
- Amrut Gaikwad as Krish Shirke-Patil – Devki and Uday's son; Kashish's brother; Lakshmi's cousin.
- Aarohi Sambre as Kashish Shirke-Patil – Devki and Uday's daughter; Krish's sister; Lakshmi's cousin.
- Atisha Naik as Mangal Shinde – Suryakant's wife; Jaydeep's mother; Gauri's foster mother; Lakshmi's grandmother.
- Girish Oak as Sudarshan Adhikari – Revati's husband; Nitya's father; Shalini's friend and business partner.
- Snehal Reddy as Revati Adhikari – Sudarshan's wife; Nitya's mother; Shalini's friend and business partner.
- Mohiniraj Gatne as Mukund "Tatya" Jadhav – Vimal's husband; Adhiraj and Sawari's father.
- Madhavi Juvekar as Vimal Jadhav – Mukund's wife; Adhiraj and Sawari's mother.
- Trushnika Shinde as Sawari Jadhav – Mukund and Vimal's daughter; Adhiraj's sister.

=== Others ===
- Harshada Khanvilkar as Vasundharadevi Ahirrao – Sarpanch of Aamgaon; Raosaheb's mother; Nitya and Adhiraj's arch rival; Ishan and Pawani's partner-in-crime.
- Makarand Navghare as Raosaheb Ahirrao – A politician; Vasundharadevi's son; Adhiraj and Nitya's arch rival; Ishan and Pawani's partner-in-crime.
- Eknath Digraskar as Pintya – Vasundharadevi and Raosaheb's sidekick and assistant; Adhiraj and Nitya's arch rival; Ishan and Pawani's partner-in-crime.
- Amey Barve as Ishan – Nitya's former love interest and ex-fiancé; Adhiraj's arch rival; Vasundharadevi, Raosaheb and Pawani's partner-in-crime; Revati and Sudarshan's business partner.
- Pratiksha Pokale as Pawani – Adhiraj's former love interest; Sawari, Santya and Lovely's friend, Nitya's arch rival; Vasundharadevi, Raosaheb and Ishan's partner-in-crime.
- Sunil Godbole as Anna – Vasundharadevi and Raosaheb's servant of Aamgaon; Lakshmi's caretaker.
- Abhishek Vernekar as Santya – Pawani, Sawari, Lovely, Adhiraj and Nitya's friend.
- Mayur Pawar as Lovely – Pawani, Sawari, Santya, Adhiraj and Nitya's friend.
- Gayatri Datar as Ruhi Karkhanis – Gauri and Jaydeep's friend; Advait's widow; Ananya's mother; Lakshmi's teacher.
- Shravi Panvelkar as Ananya Karkhanis – Advait and Ruhi's daughter; Lakshmi's friend.
- Asha Dnyate as Amma – Ranganath's brother; Shirke-Patil's maid; Gauri and Jaydeep's caretaker.
- Jayshree Jagtap as Jogtin – A soothsayer and predictor of Shirke-Patils; Jaydeep aka Adhiraj and Gauri aka Nitya's helping hand.
- Milind Shinde as Bhairu – Kabbadi trainer.
- Vikram Gaikwad as Advocate Prashant Karnik – Gauri and Jaydeep's Lawyer and friend; Jyotika's husband.
- Sanket Korlekar as Parth – Jaydeep and Jyotika's friend.
- Sayli Salunkhe / Ketaki Palav as Jyotika Desai – Jaydeep's ex-girlfriend; Prashant's wife; Gauri's arch rival; Shalini, Devki, Uday and Anil's partner-in-crime.
- Ashwini Kasar as Manasi – Jaydeep and Gauri's friend turned arch rival; Sugandha's Daughter; Shalini, Devki, Anil and Uday's partner-in-crime.
- Shailesh Korade as Chintan Baba – An evil scientist, Jaydeep and Gauri's arch rival, Shalini, Devki and Uday's partner-in-crime.

=== Guest appearances ===
- Kishori Shahane as a judge of 'Mrs. Kolhapur' competition
- Urmilla Kanetkar as a judge of 'Mrs Kolhapur' competition
- Sanket Pathak as a judge of 'Mrs. Kolhapur' competition
- Sangram Salvi as an anchor of 'Mrs. Kolhapur' competition

== Production ==
The series was initially put under development in March 2020, but was pushed until later in the year due to the COVID-19 pandemic lockdown in India. Its promo was also released in March 2020. Later, its new promo was released in end of July 2020. Filming finally began from 20 July 2020.

=== Casting ===
On 20 July 2020, it was revealed that Mandar Jadhav had been signed to play the show's main lead. Shortly after, it was announced that actress Girija Prabhu would be playing the female lead in the series. The following month, veteran actress Varsha Usgaonkar was cast in the show in a prominent role, marking her return to Marathi television after a decade-long gap. Other members of cast include Sunil Godse, Kapil Honrao, Madhavi Nimkar and Meenakshi Rathod.
