= Frédéric Soulacroix =

Italian painter

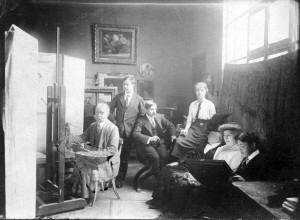
- Soulacroix at his house, circa 1920
- Born: Frédéric Soulacroix; 1 October 1858; Rome
- Died: 3 September 1933 (aged 74); Cesena
- Known for: Painting
- Movement: Realism

Frédéric Soulacroix (French: [fʁedeʁik sulakʁwa]; 1858–1933) was a French-Italian painter.

== Life and works ==
Soulacroix was born to well-known fresco painters and sculptors, Charles Soulacroix and Giacinta Diofebo. By the age of 15 years, in 1873, Frédéric entered the Accademia di Belle Arti of Florence, and, in October 1876, he was admitted to its School of Painting. He remained in Florence for many years, painting romantic genre pieces in costume of the 18th or early 19th centuries. Among his works were Diritto di pedaggio; A declaration of Love; A Goodbye; Il brindisi; Per le scale; The message; L'ultimo sguardo; Una confidenza flìrtation; Une incroyable; Buone nuove; Cattive nuove; Leaving for the War; La leggitrìce; and Il regalo dell'amante nel giorno natalizio.

His works can be seen at the Museum of Arts of Philadelphia and at the Lord Mayor collection Mansion House in London.

== Gallery ==
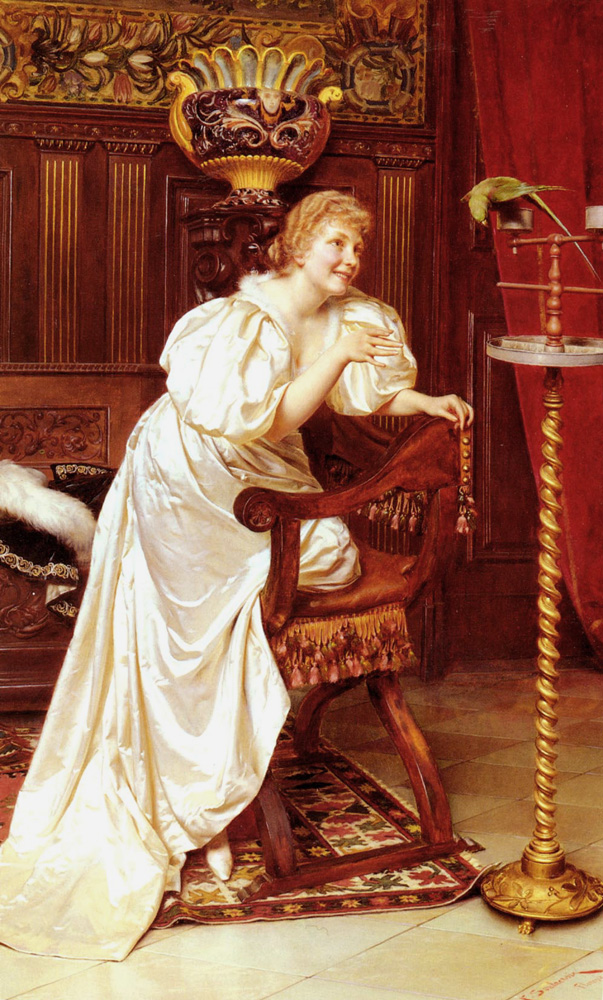
The Favourite

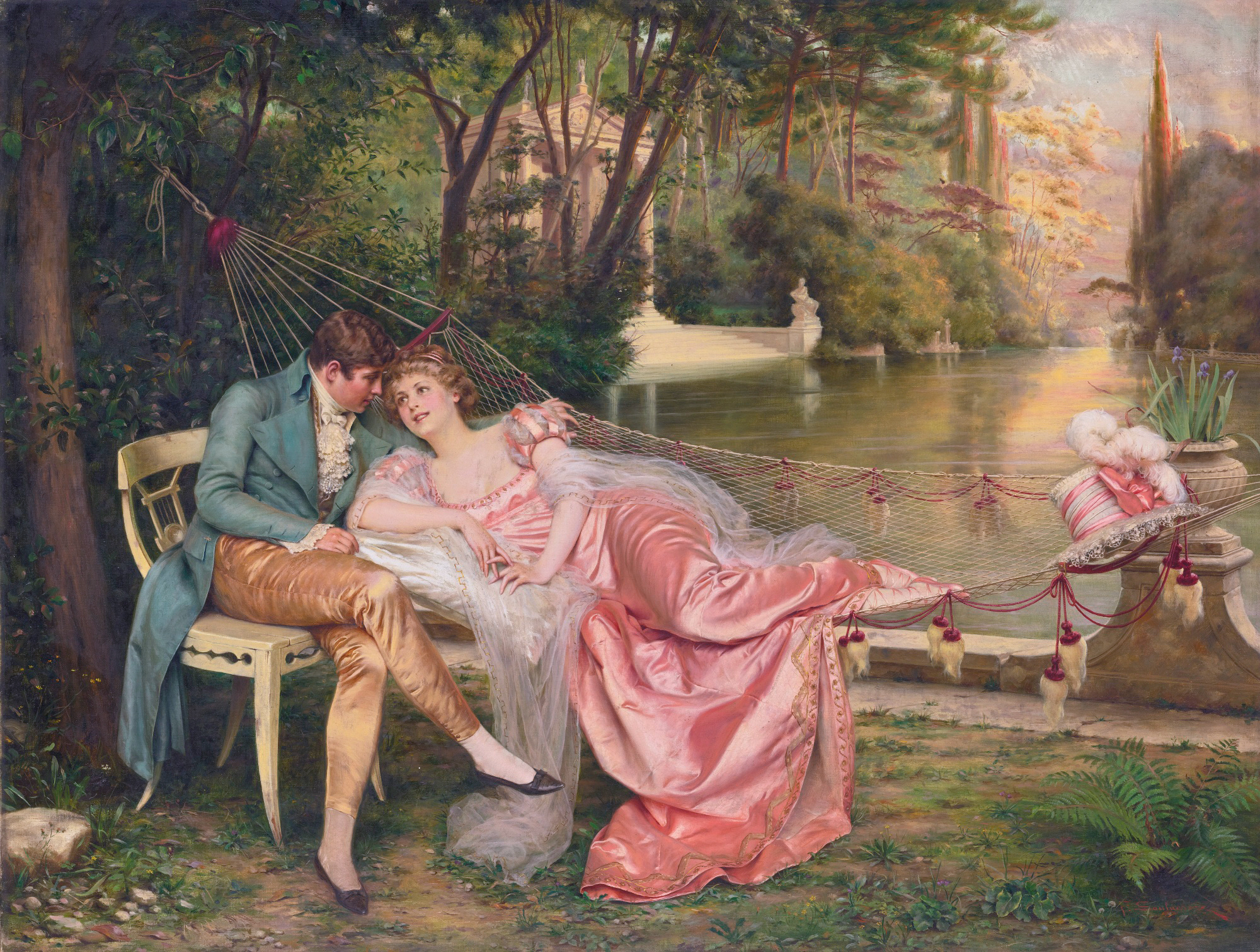
Flirtation, date unknown

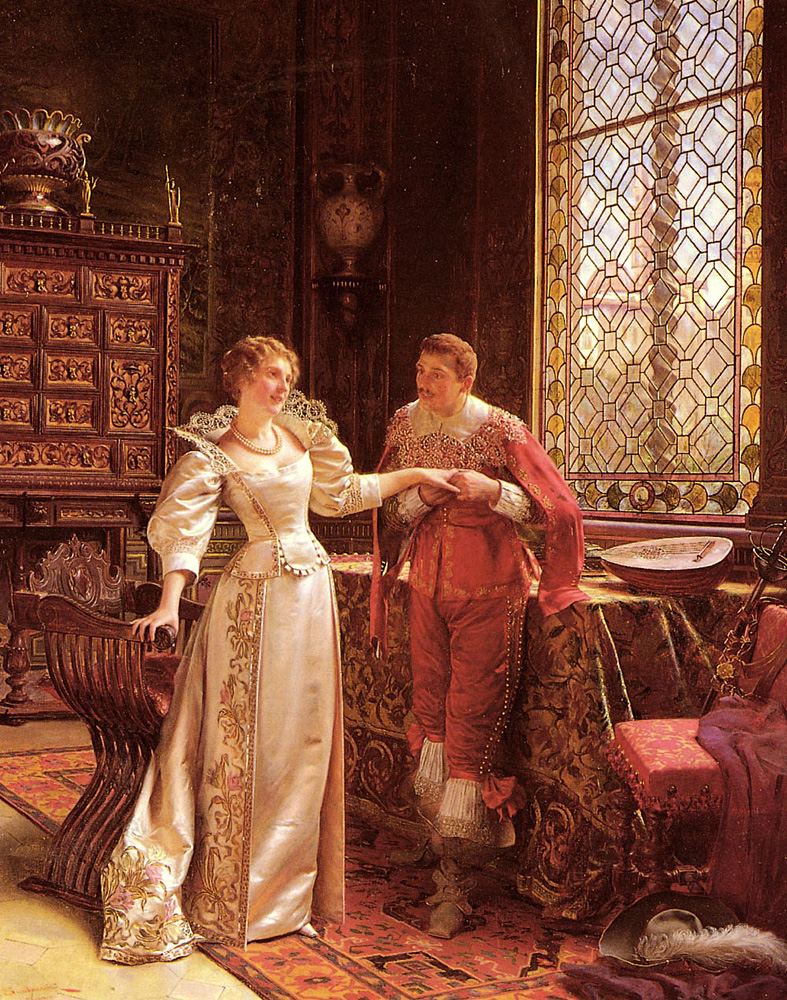
The Marriage Proposal

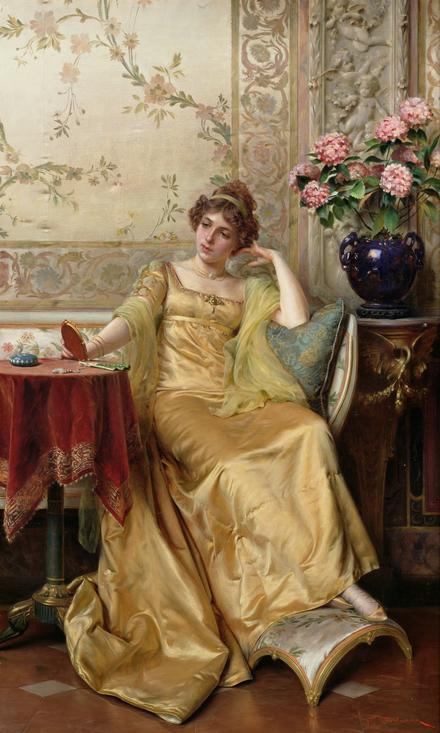
Meditation'

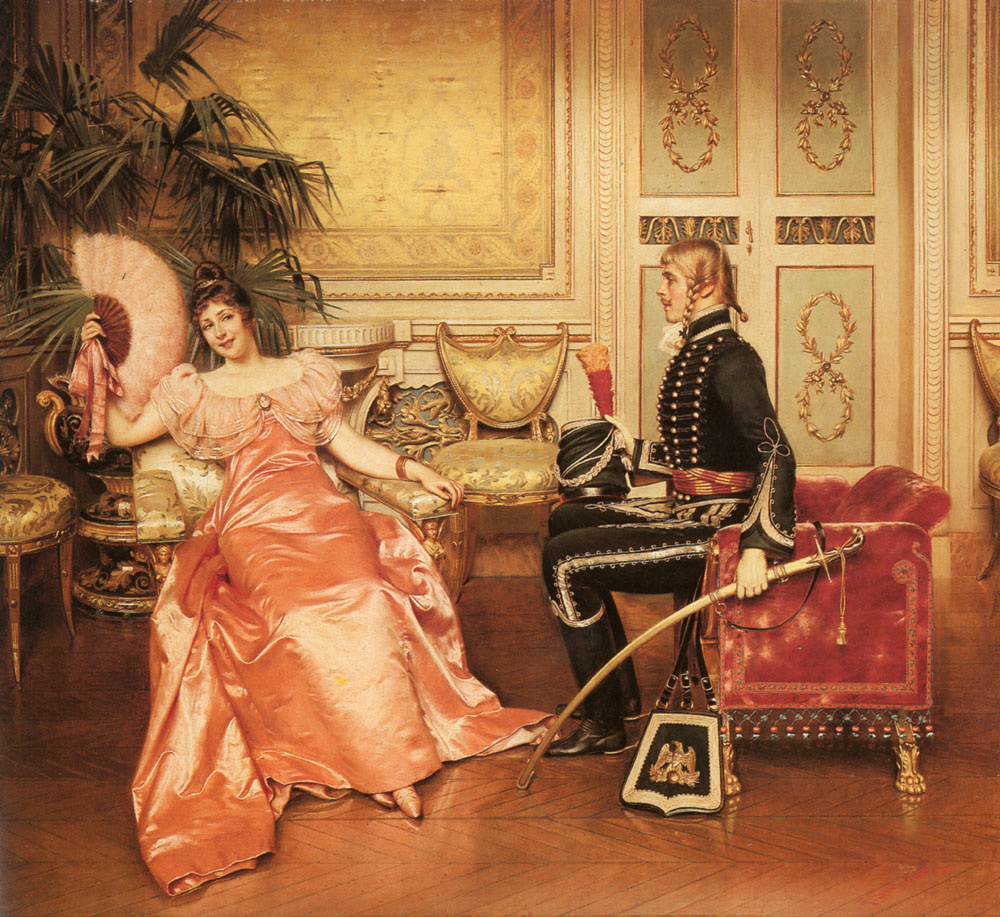
Flirtation

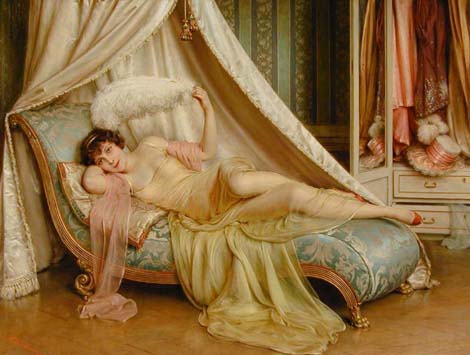
Dolce far Niente

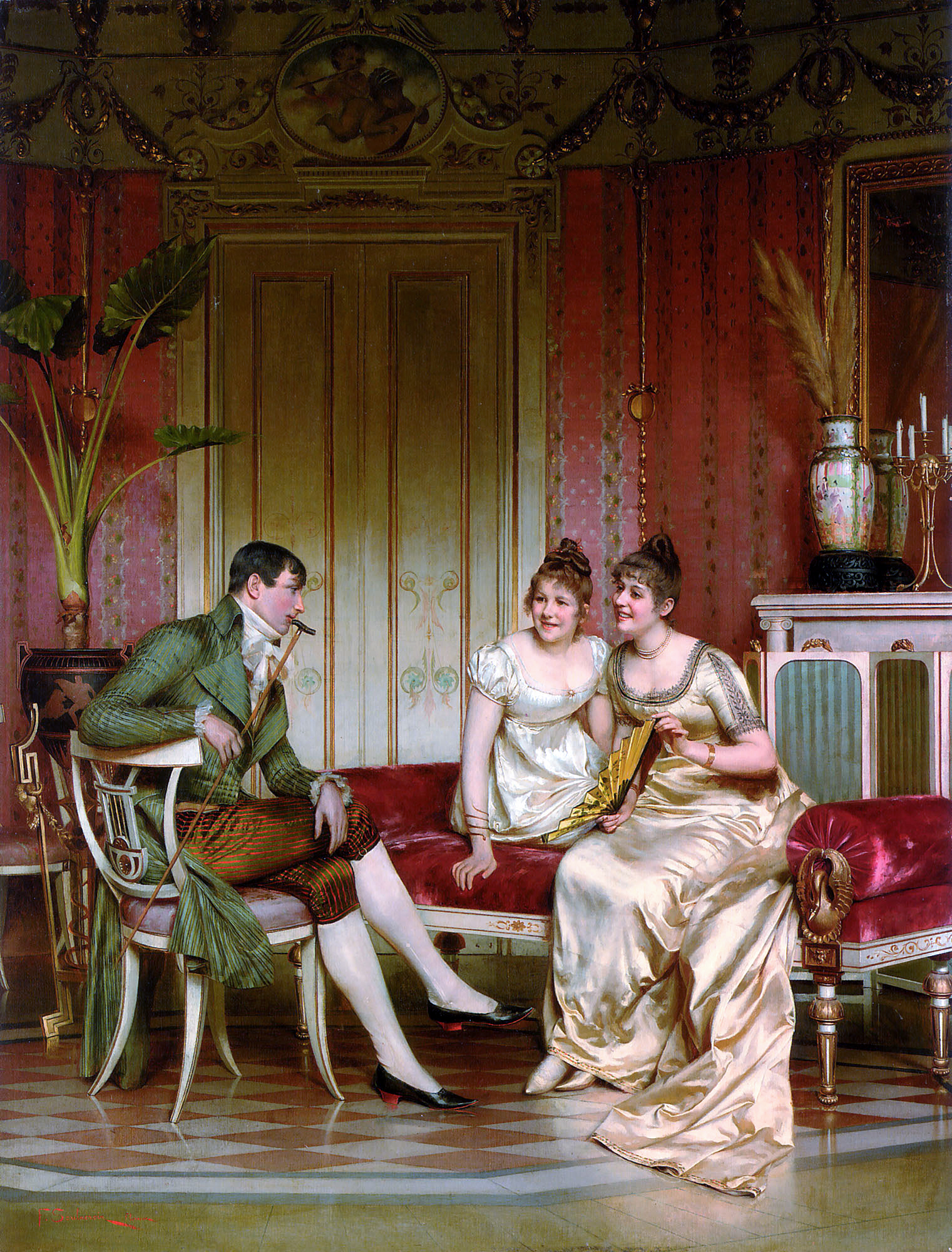
The Afternoon Visitor

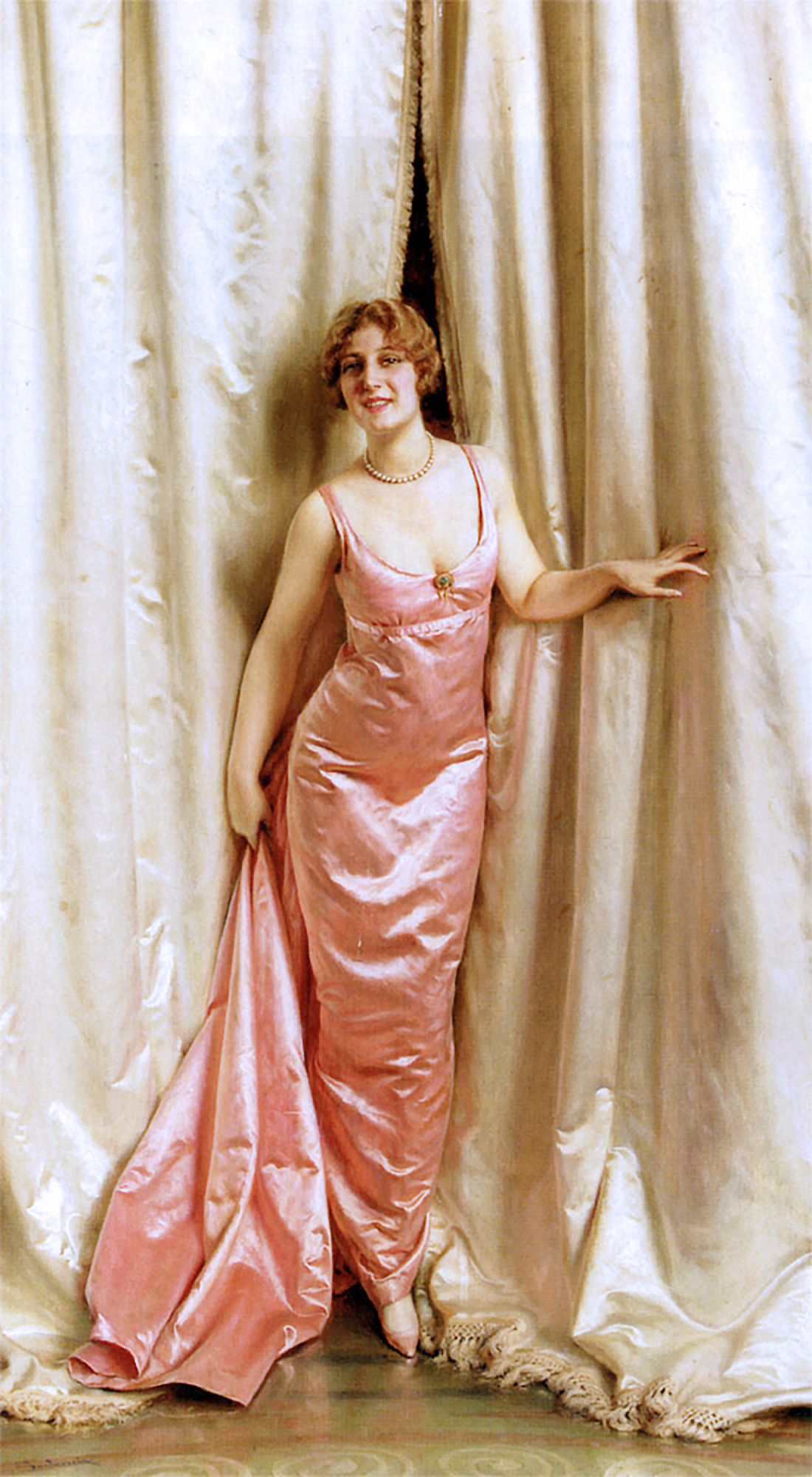
An Elegant Entrance

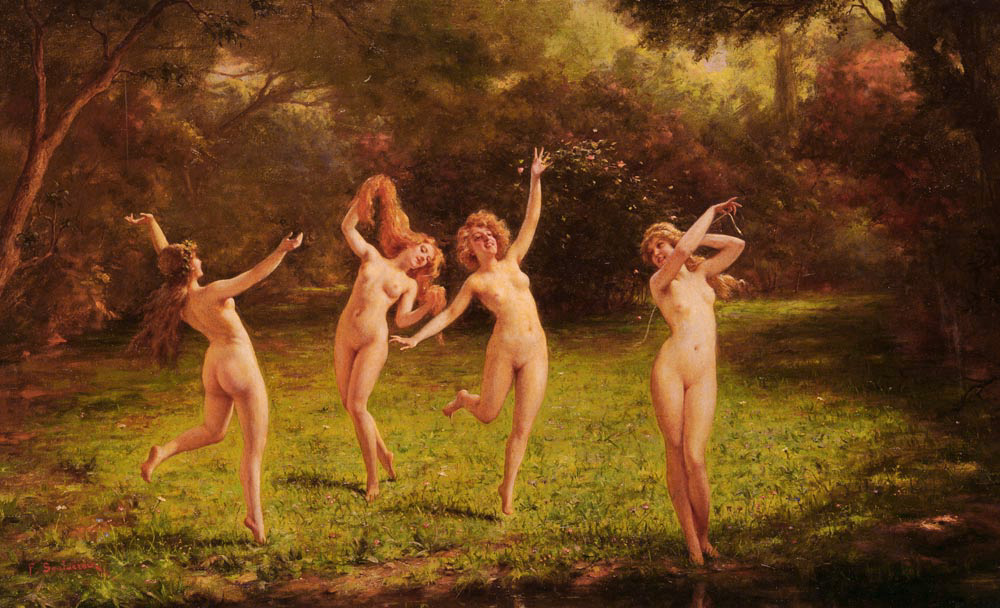
Spring
