= Ke Apon Ke Por =

Indian television soap opera

- Genre: Family drama
- Created by: Susanta Das
- Developed by: Susanta Das
- Screenplay by: Ananya Mukherjee, Rupa, Sayantani; Dialogues; Saurav Sengupta
- Story by: Ayan Bera
- Directed by: Pijush Ghosh
- Creative directors: Nafisa; Susmita
- Presented by: Bright Advertising Pvt. Ltd.
- Starring: Pallavi Sharma; Biswajit Ghosh; Monalisa Paul
- Theme music composer: Debjit Roy
- Opening theme: "Ke Apon Ke Por"
- Composer: Priyo Chattopadhyay
- Country of origin: India
- Original language: Bengali
- No. of episodes: 1507

Production
- Executive producers: Reshmi, Shaoni (Star Jalsha)
- Producers: Surinder Singh; Gurjit Singh; Sushanta Das (Boyhood Productions)
- Production location: Kolkata
- Cinematography: Ashok; Shantanu
- Editor: Shubhajit
- Camera setup: Multi-camera
- Running time: 22 minutes
- Production company: Boyhood Productions

Original release
- Network: Star Jalsha
- Release: 25 July 2016 – 27 December 2020

Ke Apon Ke Por is an Indian Bengali-language television soap opera that aired on Bengali Entertainment Channel Star Jalsha and is available on the digital platform Disney+ Hotstar. It premiered on 25 July 2016. After airing for four years, the show went off air on 27 December 2020. One of the longest running Bengali television soap opera, the show was produced by Boyhood Productions of Surinder Singh, Gurjit Singh and Sushanta Das.

Ke Apon Ke Por is a family drama series starring Pallavi Sharma and Biswajit Ghosh. Monalisa Paul played the main antagonist (Tandra), while Ananya Biswas, Arindya Banerjee, Reshmi Sen, Kalyani Mondal, Indranil Chattejee and Simran Upadhyay appear in prominent supporting roles. The show is one of the popular serials on Bengali television.

== Summary ==
Joba is a kind-hearted maid in the Sengupta family. Senguptas' youngest son, Param Sengupta returns to Kolkata and is forced to marry Joba to save her life. He encourages Joba to complete her studies and fulfil her dream of becoming a private-practicing lawyer. Senguptas' eldest daughter-in-law, Tandra sees Joba as mere a servant and often tortures her. Eventually, Param and Joba develop feelings for each other. Tandra, Gouri, Palak and Tandra's mother join hands to plot against Joba.

Tandra's attempts make Tanna mute and Joba is jailed for the same. She fakes her pregnancy to compete with pregnant Joba. Joba gives birth to a son, who is stolen by Tandra. Joba is told that her son is born dead. Tandra adopts the new-born daughter of a slum-dweller, Minoti and claims her as her daughter. Further, she supplies Param with memory-losing drugs while Joba is taken back to jail.

Joba returns and helps Param to regain his memory. Tanna recovers his speech and proves Joba's innocence. Palak apologizes to Joba for all her taunts. Joba and Param adopt an orphan named Supari, who turned out to be their long-lost son. Joba learns that Tandra's daughter, Anu is being Minoti's child. Tandra acts as paralyzed to escape jail punishment and secretly contacts with Sanjay and her mother. Joba and Param's daughter, Koyel is born. Supari is paralyzed due to interior damage and needs to be treated abroad.

Supari has been renamed as Sarthak. Joba, Param and Sarthak travel to America, leaving Koyel in care of the other Sengupta family members. Tandra poisons Koyel's mind against her parents, especially Joba for prioritizing Sarthak than Koyel.

Koyel has grown to be spoilt and addicted to drugs, as the results of Tandra and Sanjay's plans. Joba, Param and Sarthak return to India and are startled by Koyel's behavior. Joba tries to change Koyel's behavior and eventually wins her heart. The Senguptas are now assisted by a girl Itu, who is close to Koyel and Joba. Tinni marries a society entrepreneur Soheli's son, Adi. Senguptas' visits Itu's village, "Phultuli" where Sarthak is forced to marry Itu.

Sarthak refuses to accept Itu as his wife and has feelings for Soheli's daughter, Rinki, who wants to put Joba down. Joba reveals Tandra's fake act and has her arrested. Rinki and Soheli try to create problems among Sarthak and Itu, but in vain. Rinky marries Tanna. Later, Koyel falls ill and needs to have a bone marrow transplant. To save her life, Joba and Param have another daughter, Kuhu.

Kuhu ages older and Koyel recovers. Tandra changes her face by plastic surgery and returns as Rumpa. Joba becomes a judge. Koyel falls in love with advocate Surjoshekhar and their marriage is fixed. Surjo's cousin, Bishan kidnaps Koyel and forces her to marry him. Joba identifies Bishan's father, Pratap is the one who tried to murder her mother, Ratna 35 years ago. Pratap is arrested and Joba reunites with her mother and sister, Panchali. Bishan poisons Koyel's mind against Joba. Koyel studies law to defeat Joba by fighting cases against deprived people. To reform her, Joba insists Itu to study law.

Sarthak and Itu have a son, Shayan and Itu becomes a lawyer. Koyel loses a case and reconciles with Joba. Tandra returns to the Senguptas after faking her cancer. She tries to kill Joba, who survives. Joba disguises herself as Mr. Singh, with the help of her family, in order to defeat Tandra once and for all. Eventually, Joba exposes Tandra's every wicked move and has her arrested. Finally, Joba and Param remarry and also reunite Koyel with Surjo.

== Cast ==
=== Main ===
- Pallobi Sharma as Advocate Joba Basu Sengupta – Sengupta family's former maid; Ratna's elder daughter (2016–2020)
- Biswajit Ghosh as Parambrata "Param" Sengupta – An engineer; Amiyo and Lata's youngest son (2016–2020)
- Monalisa Paul / Bulbuli Panja as Tandra Sanyal Sengupta – Lalita and Tapan's daughter (2016–2019; 2020) / (2019–2020)

=== Recurring ===
- Indranil Chatterjee as Sarthak "Supari" Sengupta – An astrophysics student; Joba and Param's son (2018–2020)
  - Samriddho as Teenage Sarthak (2018)
  - Sarbik Paul as Child Sarthak (2018)
- Titli Aich as Advocate Itu Das Sengupta – Sengupta family's former maid; Sarthak's wife (2018–2020)
- Simran Upadhyay as Advocate Koyel Sengupta – Singer and dancer; Joba and Param's elder daughter (2018–2020)
  - Ragnita Manna as Child Koyel (2018)
- Raja Kundu as Surjoshekhor "Surjo" Mukherjee – A lawyer; Bishan's cousin; Koyel's fiancé (2019–2020)
- Tanishka Tiwari as Kuhu Sengupta – Joba and Param's younger daughter (2019–2020)
- Chandicharan as Amiyobhushan "Amiyo" Sengupta – Debranjan's brother (2016–2020)
- Kalyani Mondal as Lata Sengupta – Amiyo's wife (2016–2020)
- Rohit Mukherjee as Debranjan Sengupta – Amiyo's brother (2016–2018)
- Tulika Basu as Gouri Sengupta – Debranjan's wife (2016–2018)
- Avrajit Chakraborty as Jayabrata "Joy" Sengupta – Amiyo and Lata's eldest son (2016–2020)
- Manoj Ojha as Debabrata "Debu" Sengupta – Amiyo and Lata's second son (2016–2018)
- Ananya Biswas as Palak Singh Sengupta – Sanjay's sister; Debu's wife (2016–2020)
- Indrakshi Nag / Anindita Raychaudhury/ Unknown as Mayuri Sengupta Dasgupta – Amiyo and Lata's elder daughter (2016–2018) / (2019–2020)

[Anirban Ghosh as Dr. Swapnomoy Dasgupta – Mayuri's husband (2016–2020)

- Soumi Paul as Tia Sengupta Majumdar – Amiyo and Lata's younger daughter (2016–2017; 2019–2020)
- Sutirtha Saha as Topesh "Topu" Majumdar – Tia's estranged husband (2016–2017)
- Sreemoyee Chattoraj Mallick as Tiyasha "Tinni" Sengupta Chowdhury – Palak and Debu's daughter (2018–2020)
  - Unknown as Child Tinni (2016–2017)
- Aritram Mukherjee / Atmadeep Ghosh as Aditya "Adi" Chowdhury – Soheli's son (2018–2020)
- Sayan Karmakar as Tamoghna "Tanna" Sengupta – Palak and Debu's son (2018–2020)
  - Tanish Chakraborty as Child Tanna (2016–2017)
- Liza Sarkar as Rinki Chowdhury Sengupta – Soheli's daughter (2018–2020)
- Laboni Bhattacharjee as Diya "Mitti" Dasgupta – Mayuri and Swapnomoy's daughter (2019–2020)
- Payel Deb as Dr. Anushka "Anu" Sengupta – Minoti's daughter (2018–2020)
- Suvajit Kar as Dr. Rahul – Anu's friend turned husband (2018–2020)
- Shaon Dey as Soheli Chowdhury – Adi and Rinky's mother (2018–2020)
- Shraboni Bonik as Ratna "Kusum" Das – Joba and Panchali's mother (2020)
- Arpita Mondal as Panchali Bosu – Ratna's younger daughter (2020)
- Sudip Sarkar as Bishan Nondi – Pratap's son (2020)
- Arindam Banerjee as Pratap Nondi – Bishan's father (2020)
- Reshmi Sen as Lalita Sanyal – Tapan's wife (2016–2017)/(2017-2020)
- Tapan Ganguly as Tapan Sanyal – Lalita's husband (2016)
- Arindya Banerjee as Sanjay "Sanju" Singh – Palak's brother (2016–2020)
- Tania Ganguly as Deblina aka Debi – Param's childhood friend and aspirant (2016–2017)
- Saugata Bandyopadhyay as Sonatan Bosu – Terrorist; Joba and Panchali's cousin (2017)
- Prantik Banerjee as Anirban "Ani" Banerjee – Mayuri's ex-boyfriend (2017)
- Krishnakishore Mukherjee as Sanyashi Arpananda – A crime syndicate head who feigns piety (2018)
- Samrat Mukherjee as Dipanjan – Tandra's boyfriend and a money launderer (2018)
- Sharbari Mukherjee as Mrs. Singh – Palak and Sanjay's aunt (2018)
- Aemila Sadhukhan as Sreelekha aka Basabdutta – Param's aspirant and a self-proclaimed god-woman (2018)
- Lakshya Punjabi as Ronnie – Koyel's friend (2018)
- Amitabh Bhattacharjee as Robin Roy – Koyel's employer (2020)
