= List of Marathi films of 2004 =

A list of films produced by the Marathi language film industry based in Maharashtra in the year 2004.

== 2004 Releases ==
A list of Marathi films released in 2004.

Year	Film	Director	Cast	Release Date	Producer	Notes	Source
2004
2004	Aai Tuza Ashirwad	Mayur Vaishnav	Ramesh Bhatkar, Alka Kubal, Ashok Saraf	9 August 2004 (India)	Everest Entertainment		
2004	Aga Bai Arrecha!	Kedar Shinde	Sanjay Narvekar, Priyanka Yadav, Dilip Prabhavalkar				
2004	Anahat	Amol Palekar	Sonali Bendre, Anant Nag, Deepti Naval	6 May 2004 (UK)		Sonali Bendre's Marathi debut	
2004	Chakwa	Jatin Satish Vagale	Atul Kulkarni, Deepa Parab, Mukta Barve, Suhas Palashikar, Amita Khopkar, Pradeep Velankar, Vidyadhar Joshi, Dr. Sharad Bhutadiya, Shubhangi Damale, Sandesh Kulkarni		Mandar Patwardhan	Debut film of Mukta Barve	
2004	Devrai	Sumitra Bhave–Sunil Sukthankar	Atul Kulkarni, Sonali Kulkarni, Tushar Dalvi	11 March 2004	Schizophrenia Awareness Association	Mohan Agashe, who plays the psychiatrist, is a well known Professor of Psychiatry at Pune, India.	
2004	Ek Sagar Kinaree...	Laxmikant Shetgaonkar	Claire Price, Dhanu Dicholkar, Gopikant Shirodkar		National Film Development Corporation of India, Gomantak Marathi Academy		
2004	Kunku Lavte Mahercha	Subhash Phadke	Anand Abhyankar, Vrushali Bhambere, Ila Bhatey, Vijay Chavan				
2004	Navra Maza Navsacha	Sachin	Sachin, Supriya Pilgaonkar, Ashok Saraf	November 2004 (India)	Sushriya Arts		
2004	Oti Krishnamaichi	Mayur Vaishnav	Alka Kubal, Ravi Patwardhan, Sharad Ponkshe	12 August 2004 (India)	Everest Entertainment		
2004	Pachhadlela	Mahesh Kothare	Bharat Jadhav, Shreyas Talpade, Dilip Prabhavalkar	7 May 2004	Jenima Films International	There are nearly 10 minutes of Digital Special Effects in the film.Its Last movie of Superstar Laxmikant Berde and Marathi debut film of Shreyas Talpade.	
2004	Saatchya Aat Gharat	Sanjay Surkar	Bharati Achrekar, Makarand Anaspure, Vibhawari Deshpande, Nishikant Kamat	31 May 2004 (India)	Asmita Chitra, Everest Entertainment		
2004	Savarkhed Ek Gaon	Rajiv Patil	Vikram Gokhale, Sadashiv Amrapurkar, Ankush Choudhary, Shreyas Talpade	April 2004 (India)	Eera Films	Directorial Debut of iconic director Rajiv Patil.	
2004	Shegavicha Rana Gajanan	Babanrao Gholap	Ravindra Berde, Babanrao Gholap, Sayaji Shinde	11 December 2004 (India)	Everest Entertainment		
2004	Shwaas	Sandeep Sawant	Arun Nalawade, Ashwin Chitale, Sandeep Kulkarni	10 December 2004 (USA)	Arun Nalawade, Ashwin Chitale, Sandeep Sawant	India's entry for Best foreign film at the Oscars 2004.	
