= 51st National Film Awards =

Film awards in India

- Awarded for: Best of Indian cinema in 2003
- Awarded by: Directorate of Film Festivals
- Presented by: Dr. A. P. J. Abdul Kalam (President of India)
- Announced on: 14 August 2004
- Presented on: 2 February 2005
- Official website: dff.nic.in

Highlights
- Best Feature Film: Shwaas
- Best Non-Feature Film: • War and Peace • Kaya Poochhe Maya Se
- Best Book: Filmi Jagat Mein Ardhashakti Ka Romanch
- Best Film Critic: Saibal Chatterjee
- Dadasaheb Phalke Award: Mrinal Sen
- Most awards: • Bhalo Theko • Chokher Bali • Abar Aranye • Koi... Mil Gaya (3)

The 51st National Film Awards, presented by the Directorate of Film Festivals, is the organisation set up by the Ministry of Information and Broadcasting, India to felicitate the best of Indian Cinema released in the year 2003.

Awards were announced by the committee headed by Basu Chatterjee, Bhimsain and K. N. T. Sastry for the feature films, non-feature films and books written on Indian cinema, respectively, on 14 August 2004; whereas award ceremony took place on 3 February 2005 and the awards were given away by then President of India, A. P. J. Abdul Kalam.

With the 51st National Film Awards, new category for Non-feature Film for Best Narration / Voice Over was introduced and awarded with 'Rajat Kamal (Silver Lotus)'.

== Awards ==
Awards were divided into feature films, non-feature films and books written on Indian cinema.

=== Lifetime Achievement Award ===
Name of Award	Image	Awardee(s)	Awarded As	Awards
Dadasaheb Phalke Award		Mrinal Sen	director	Swarna Kamal, ₹ 200,000 and a Shawl

=== Feature films ===
Feature films were awarded at All India as well as regional level. For 51st National Film Awards, a Marathi film, Shwaas won the National Film Award for Best Feature Film; whereas three Bengali films, Abar Aranye, Bhalo Theko and Chokher Bali, along with a Hindi film, Koi... Mil Gaya won the maximum number of awards (3). Following were the awards given in each category:

==== Juries ====
A committee headed by Basu Chatterjee was appointed to evaluate the feature films awards. Following were the jury members:

- Jury Members
  - Basu Chatterjee (chairperson) • Vijaya Nirmala • N. Krishnakumar (Unni) • Sumalatha • K. B. Tilak • Shailaja Bajpai • Virendra Saini
  - Madhu Jain • Rashmi Doraiswamy • Gayatri Chatterjee • Raj Datt • Makhonmani Mongsaba • Sher Choudhary • Mohan Kondajji
  - Alaya Kumar Mohanty • Jyoti Sarup • Nimmala Shankar

==== All India Award ====
Following were the awards given:

===== Golden Lotus Award =====
Official Name: Swarna Kamal

All the awardees are awarded with 'Golden Lotus Award (Swarna Kamal)', a certificate and cash prize.

Name of Award	Name of Film	Language	Awardee(s)	Cash prize
Best Feature Film	Shwaas	Marathi	Producer: Arun Nalawade director: Sandeep Sawant	₹ 50,000/- Each
Best Feature Film	Citation: For its sensitive and moving portrayal of the relationship between a grandfather and his grandson when the child is about to lose his vision.			
Best Debut Film of a Director	Margam	Malayalam	Producer: Rajiv Vijay Raghavan; Director: Rajiv Vijay Raghavan	₹ 25,000/- Each
Best Debut Film of a Director	Citation: For poignantly capturing the troubled journey of a middle-aged individual re-examining his political past in the light of prevailing socio-political values.			
Best Popular Film Providing Wholesome Entertainment	Munna Bhai M.B.B.S.	Hindi	Producer: Vidhu Vinod Chopra; Director: Rajkumar Hirani	₹ 40,000/- Each
Best Popular Film Providing Wholesome Entertainment	Citation: For dealing with social issues with humor and compassion.			
Best Children's Film	Tora	Assamese	Producer: Children's Film Society; Director: Jahnu Barua	₹ 30,000/- Each
Best Children's Film	Citation: For showing how a child brings down the boundaries and barriers created by adults.			
Best Direction	Abar Aranye	Bengali	Gautam Ghose	₹ 50,000/-
Best Direction	Citation: For his complex weaving of human destines across a wide range of socio-political and cinematic histories.			

===== Silver Lotus Award =====
Official Name: Rajat Kamal

All the awardees are awarded with 'Silver Lotus Award (Rajat Kamal)', a certificate and cash prize.

Name of Award	Name of Film	Language	Awardee(s)	Cash prize
Best Feature Film on National Integration	Pinjar	Hindi	Producer: Lucky Star Entertainment Ltd; Director: Chandraprakash Dwivedi	₹ 30,000/- Each
Best Feature Film on National Integration	Citation: For exploring the power of human relationships in overcoming social and religious schisms.			
Best Film on Family Welfare	Paadam Onnu: Oru Vilapam	Malayalam	Producer: Aryadan Shaukat; Director: T. V. Chandran	₹ 30,000/- Each
Best Film on Family Welfare	Citation: For raising a voice against early marriage and for its advocacy of women's education in a conservative society.			
Best Film on Other Social Issues	Koi... Mil Gaya	Hindi	Producer: Rakesh Roshan; Director: Rakesh Roshan	₹ 30,000/- Each
Best Film on Other Social Issues	Citation: For its compassionate portrayal of a mentally challenged young man who is able to reach out to the wonders of the universe.			₹ 30,000/- Each
Best Film on Other Social Issues	Gangaajal	Hindi	Producer: Prakash Jha; Director: Prakash Jha	₹ 30,000/- Each
Best Film on Other Social Issues	Citation: For its stark delineation of a wide range of wrongs pervading society, and state.			₹ 30,000/- Each
Best Film on Environment / Conservation / Preservation	Juye Poora Xoon	Assamese	Producer: Sanjib Sabhapandit; Director: Sanjib Sabhapandit	₹ 30,000/- Each
Best Film on Environment / Conservation / Preservation	Citation: For its representation of large-scale migration and the erosion of a way of life by floods and industrialisation.			
Best Actor	Pithamagan	Tamil	Vikram	₹ 10,000/-
Best Actor	Citation: For his powerful performance in a difficult and demanding role.			
Best Actress	Paadam Onnu: Oru Vilapam	Malayalam	Meera Jasmine	₹ 10,000/-
Best Actress	Citation: For her sustained and subtle portrayal of a young girl trapped in an early, polyandrous marriage and her ability to convey her little joys and large sorrows.			
Best Supporting Actor	Maqbool	Hindi	Pankaj Kapoor	₹ 10,000/-
Best Supporting Actor	Citation: For his riveting yet understated performance as a mafia don.			
Best Supporting Actress	Abar Aranye	Bengali	Sharmila Tagore	₹ 10,000/-
Best Supporting Actress	Citation: For the grace with which she handles social and personal relationships.			
Best Child Artist	Shwaas	Marathi	Ashwin Chitale	₹ 5,000/- Each
Best Child Artist	Citation: For his haunting performance as a child who realises he is going to lose his eyesight.			₹ 5,000/- Each
Best Child Artist	Ente Veedu Appoontem	Malayalam	Kalidasan	₹ 5,000/- Each
Best Child Artist	Citation: For his versatility in portraying a range of complex emotions.			₹ 5,000/- Each
Best Male Playback Singer	Kal Ho Naa Ho ("Kal Ho Naa Ho")	Hindi	Sonu Nigam	₹ 10,000/-
Best Male Playback Singer	Citation: For his memorable rendition of the title song that captures the spirit of the film.			
Best Female Playback Singer	Akashitorar Kothare	Assamese	Tarali Sarma	₹ 10,000/-
Best Female Playback Singer	Citation: For her tuneful rendition of a devotional song without instrumental accompaniment.			
Best Cinematography	Bhalo Theko	Bengali	Cameraman: Abhik Mukhopadhyay; Laboratory Processing: Rainbow Color Lab	₹ 10,000/- Each
Best Cinematography	Citation: For enriching the narrative with tranquility and beauty.			
Best Screenplay	Abar Aranye	Bengali	Gautam Ghose	₹ 10,000/-
Best Screenplay	Citation: For weaving together the strands of time creating a resonant dialogue between the past and the present.			
Best Audiography	Bhalo Theko	Bengali	• Anup Mukhopadhyay • Deepon Chatterjee	₹ 10,000/-
Best Audiography	Citation: For the innovative use of sound, its quality and timbre.			
Best Editing	Samay: When Time Strikes	Hindi	Aarif Sheikh	₹ 10,000/-
Best Editing	Citation: For its crisp cutting that successfully sustains the tempo of the film's suspense.			
Best Art Direction	Chokher Bali	Bengali	Indranil Ghosh	₹ 5,000/- Each
Best Art Direction	Citation: For his muted recreation of a period and its ambiance.			₹ 5,000/- Each
Best Art Direction	Meenaxi: A Tale of Three Cities	Hindi	Sharmishta Roy	₹ 5,000/- Each
Best Art Direction	Citation: For creating a colourful ambiance which effectively supported the narrative.			₹ 5,000/- Each
Best Costume Design	Chokher Bali	Bengali	• Bibi Ray • Sushanto Pal	₹ 10,000/-
Best Costume Design	Citation: For evoking a period in harmony with the spirit of the film's art direction.			
Best Music Direction	Kal Ho Naa Ho	Hindi	Shankar–Ehsaan–Loy	₹ 10,000/-
Best Music Direction	Citation: For its wide range of styles and modes, enriching the themes of the film.			
Best Lyrics	Tagore ("Nenusaitham")	Telugu	Suddala Ashok Teja	₹ 10,000/-
Best Lyrics	Citation: For relating Sri Sri's poem to contemporary times in order to awaken the masses against social evils.			
Best Special Effects	Koi... Mil Gaya	Hindi	• Creator Bimmini Special Fx and Design Studios – James Colmer and Lara Denman • Digital Art Media – Marc Kolbe and Craig Mumma	₹ 10,000/-
Best Special Effects	Citation: For its apt incorporation of special effects in its depiction of fantasy.			
Best Choreography	Koi... Mil Gaya ("Idhar Chala Main Udhar Chala")	Hindi	Farah Khan	₹ 10,000/-
Best Choreography	Citation: For its seamless weaving of different dance styles, in the best traditions of the musical.			
Special Jury Award	Pinjar	Hindi	Manoj Bajpai (Actor)	₹ 12,500/-
Special Jury Award	Citation: For his portrayal of the dilemma of a man caught between the dictates of his community and his love for his wife.			
Special Jury Award	Bhalo Theko	Bengali	• Roopkatha (Producer) • Goutam Halder (director)	₹ 6,250/- Each
Special Jury Award	Citation: For its quiet but masterful foray into the new cinematic idioms.			
Special Mention	Mouni	Kannada	H. G. Dattatreya (Actor)	Certificate Only
Special Mention	Citation: For his tremendous screen presence that makes the film.			Certificate Only
Special Mention		Malayalam	Nedumudi Venu (Actor)	Certificate Only
Special Mention	Citation: For his extra ordinary versatility in a range of roles in Malayalam films made in 2003.			Certificate Only

==== Regional Awards ====
The award is given to best film in the regional languages in India.

Name of Award	Name of Film	Awardee(s)	Cash prize
Best Feature Film in Assamese	Akashitarar Kathare	Producer: Sangeeta Tamuli; Director: Manju Borah	₹ 20,000/- Each
Best Feature Film in Assamese	Citation: For its juxtaposition of a woman's search for her cultural heritage and its loss.		
Best Feature Film in Bengali	Chokher Bali	Producer: Shrikant Mohta and Mahendra Soni; Director: Rituparno Ghosh	₹ 20,000/- Each
Best Feature Film in Bengali	Citation: For its operatic play of passions, breaking social norms and taboos.		
Best Feature Film in Hindi	Raghu Romeo	Producer: NFDC; Director: Rajat Kapoor	₹ 20,000/- Each
Best Feature Film in Hindi	Citation: For a zestful spoof of popular culture where the boundaries of illusion and reality collapse and the common man turns into hero.		
Best Feature Film in Kannada	Preethi Prema Pranaya	Producer: Kavitha Lankesh; Director: Kavitha Lankesh	₹ 20,000/- Each
Best Feature Film in Kannada	Citation: For depicting the contrasting values of three generations in a light hearted manner.		
Best Feature Film in Malayalam	Saphalam	Producer: Anil Thomas; Director: Asok R. Nath	₹ 20,000/- Each
Best Feature Film in Malayalam	Citation: For its sensitive portrayal of an old couple in their loneliness and togetherness.		
Best Feature Film in Marathi	Not Only Mrs. Raut	Producer: Aditi Deshpande; Director: Gajendra Ahire	₹ 20,000/- Each
Best Feature Film in Marathi	Citation: For its treatment of two women's struggle against male exploitation and domination.		
Best Feature Film in Odia	Aw Aaakare Aa	Producer: Subash Das; Director: Subash Das	₹ 20,000/- Each
Best Feature Film in Odia	Citation: For a passionate call for reforms in the present education system.		
Best Feature Film in Tamil	Iyarkai	Producer: V. R. Kumar; Director: S. P. Jananathan	₹ 20,000/- Each
Best Feature Film in Tamil	Citation: For a rich visual portrayal of a love story set against a unique canvas.		
Best Feature Film in Telugu	Aithe	Producer: Gangaraju Gunnam; Director: Chandra Sekhar Yeleti	₹ 20,000/- Each
Best Feature Film in Telugu	Citation: For its portrayal of frustration in the youth, successfully solving it through a positive approach almost making the characters role models.		

Best Feature Film in Each of the Language Other Than Those Specified in the Schedule VIII of the Constitution

Name of Award	Name of Film	Awardee(s)	Cash prize
Best Feature Film in English	Dance Like A Man	Producer: NFDC; Director: Pamela Rooks	₹ 20,000/- Each
Best Feature Film in English	Citation: For a human drama that engages issues of creativity and gender dynamics.		

=== Non-Feature Films ===
Short Films made in any Indian language and certified by the Central Board of Film Certification as a documentary/newsreel/fiction are eligible for non-feature film section.

==== Juries ====
A committee headed by Bhim Sen was appointed to evaluate the non-feature films awards. Following were the jury members:

- Jury Members
  - Bhim Sen (chairperson) • Jose Sebastian • Satyabrata Kalita • Haimanti Banerjee • Rajiv Khandagle • N. S. Shankar • Anwar Jamal

==== Golden Lotus Award ====
Official Name: Swarna Kamal

All the awardees are awarded with 'Golden Lotus Award (Swarna Kamal)', a certificate and cash prize.

Name of Award	Name of Film	Language	Awardee(s)	Cash prize
Best Non-Feature Film	War and Peace	English	Producer: Anand Patwardhan; Director: Anand Patwardhan	₹ 10,000/- Each
Best Non-Feature Film	Citation: For setting out to search for the roots of violence manifest in many forms in the current times- from communal forces to nuclear race, Shot in India, Pakistan, Japan and USA, the film achieves a multi-layered understanding of these deep rooted tensions- at the same time recording the aspirations for peace, harmony and secularism, in the backdrop of Gandhian thought.			₹ 10,000/- Each
Best Non-Feature Film	Kaya Poochhe Maya Se	Hindi	Producer: Arvind Sinha; Director: Arvind Sinha	₹ 10,000/- Each
Best Non-Feature Film	Citation: For a probing, thoughtful, intense, yet a non-judgmental record of the myriad faces of humanity floating around the Howrah Station that lies by the side of the river Ganga. The director with just his keen eye and an unpredictable symmetry of images, gains an inner eye into the mystery called people. It is as though an entire civilisation is reconstructed through images of floating faces, people and sounds.			₹ 10,000/- Each
Best Non-Feature Film Direction	Kaya Poochhe Maya Se	Hindi	Arvind Sinha	₹ 10,000/- Each
Best Non-Feature Film Direction	Citation: For the teeming surge of humanity in Howrah station with compassion and warmth.			

==== Silver Lotus Award ====
Official Name: Rajat Kamal

All the awardees are awarded with 'Silver Lotus Award (Rajat Kamal)' and cash prize.

Name of Award	Name of Film	Language	Awardee(s)	Cash prize
Best First Non-Feature Film	An Encounter with a Life Living	Hindi and English	Producer: Vinu Abraham; Director: Suja	₹ 10,000/- Each
Best First Non-Feature Film	Citation: For depicting the plight of a physically incapacitated Sarasu and her cheerful will to live. The director achieves this bringing out the totality, spiritual richness of a "life lived only in the mind" – through an innovative narrative idiom.			
Best Anthropological / Ethnographic Film	Aur Ghumantu Thhahar Gaye	Hindi	Producer: Leo Arts Communication; Director: Meenakshi Vinay Rai	₹ 10,000/- Each
Best Anthropological / Ethnographic Film	Citation: For records the life of the nomadic tribe Ghumantu and their peculiar plight of being labelled "habitual offenders". It also records the efforts made at rehabilitating them.			
Best Historical Reconstruction / Compilation Film	Vaidyaratnam P.S. Varrier	English	Producer: Kerala State Film Development Corporation; Director: T. Krishnan Unni	₹ 10,000/- Each
Best Historical Reconstruction / Compilation Film	Citation: For records the life of a pioneer in Ayurvedic medicine Dr. P.S. Varrier. The film also brings out his many faceted personality along with his contribution to performing arts and literature.			
Best Arts / Cultural Film	Picasso Metamorphoses	English	Producer: Y. N. Engineer for Films Division; Director: Nandkumar Sadamate	₹ 10,000/- Each
Best Arts / Cultural Film	Citation: For its rare attempt at interpreting the works of the legendary painter making him accessible even to those uninitiated to his art. The film examines the troubled times that Picasso lived in, his ideals, his relationships and the inevitable symbiosis of his life and work.			
Best Scientific Film / Best Environment / Conservation / Preservation Film (Jointly given)	The 18 Elephant – Three Monologues	Malayalam	Producer: Savithri Divakaran; Director: P. Balan	₹ 10,000/- Each
Best Scientific Film / Best Environment / Conservation / Preservation Film (Jointly given)	Citation: For using the novel method of elephants narrating their own story (in human voice) to raise a cry against "man centric" concept of development. The film also succeeds in raising bigger issues of ecological balance, and cruelty to animals.			
Best Promotional Film	Ladakh – The Land Of Mystery	English	Producer: Biyot Projna Tripathy; Director: Biyot Projna Tripathy	₹ 10,000/- Each
Best Promotional Film	Citation: For capturing the shining landscape, the people, their culture, beliefs and way of life in pleasing visuals.			
Best Agricultural Film	Seeds Of Life	English	Producer: Rajiv Mehrotra; Director: Usha Albuquerque	₹ 10,000/- Each
Best Agricultural Film	Citation: For its focus on "Navadanya" the movement launched to retrieve the traditional wisdom in alternative farming methods. The film's importance emerges in the face of the current globalisation-led agrarian uncertainties.			
Best Film on Social Issues	Way Back Home	Bengali	Producer:Rajasri Mukhopadhyay; Director: Supriyo Sen	₹ 10,000/- Each
Best Film on Social Issues	Citation: For its recounting of a remarkable journey to a homeland lost for ever, as a result of partition. A family driven out of East Pakistan during partition, undertakes a journey back after fifty years to their "homeland". The journey eventually turns into a story of painful memories, lost relationships and the madness of partition- all achieved through a touching personal narrative.			
Best Educational / Motivational / Instructional Film	Fiddlers on the Thatch	English	Producer: Rajiv Mehrotra; Director: Trisha Das	₹ 10,000/- Each
Best Educational / Motivational / Instructional Film	Citation: This film is the story of "The Gandhian Ashram School" in Kalimpong but it is also a story of the deprived kids gaining their dignity and hope of a teacher who fed their bodies and spirit – all bound by the common thread of music. The director achieves a poignant blend of visual narrative and music to create a heartwarming tale of "sharing and caring" in this film.			
Best Exploration / Adventure Film	Madness in the Desert	English	Producer: Aamir Khan; Director: Satyajit Bhatkal	₹ 10,000/- Each
Best Exploration / Adventure Film	Citation: For explores the spirit, the effort and the mammoth ambition behind the making of "Lagaan". The director has rendered this into a gripping and slick tale.			
Best Investigative Film	A Silent Killer	English	Producer: Dhananjoy Mondal; Director: Dhananjoy Mondal	₹ 10,000/- Each
Best Investigative Film	Citation: The film is a forceful statement on the disastrous consequences of millions of people drinking water contaminated with "arsenic". In a simple but effective manner, the filmmaker explores and then brings out the enormity of the problem.			
Best Animation Film	Jeo Aur Jeene Do	Hindi	Producer: Children's Film Society; Director: B. R. Sarnaik; Animator: Harshad Sayeed Noori	₹ 10,000/- Each
Best Animation Film	Citation: In a humorous, colourful but effective way, the film conveys the message of wild life protection. The imaginative use of animation techniques enhances the appeal of the film, especially to children.			
Best Short Fiction Film	Sati Radhika	Assamese	Producer: Anjali Das; Director: Anjali Das	₹ 10,000/- Each
Best Short Fiction Film	Citation: For a popular tale relating to the great 14th century reformer Shankara Deva who stood against caste inequality. The tale narrates an allegory wherein Sati Radhika a fisherwoman perform a miraculous feat, which others could not, thus bringing out the noble concept of social equality.			
Best Cinematography	Kaya Poochhe Maya Se	Hindi	Cameraman: Ranjan Palit; Laboratory Processing: Prasad Film Laboratory	₹ 5,000/- Each
Best Cinematography	Citation: For a cinematic observation of myriad shades of humanity and breathtaking chiaroscuro of light and shade.			₹ 5,000/- Each
Best Cinematography	The 18 Elephants – 3 Monologues	Malayalam	Cameraman: K. G. Jayan; Laboratory Processing: Prasad Film Laboratory	₹ 5,000/- Each
Best Cinematography	Citation: For his camera vision, which is a manifesto of exploring the reality, and transporting it to the surreal, to beyond the manifest.			₹ 5,000/- Each
Best Audiography	Bhaba Paagla	Bengali	Ramesh Birajdar	₹ 10,000/-
Best Audiography	Citation: For sound design which evokes a vision of a world far, far away from the madding crowd, which oscillates between the silences and nature's pristine sounds.			
Best Editing	Unni	Malayalam	Beena Paul	₹ 10,000/-
Best Editing	Citation: For the way she supports the eerie pace of a story that swings from here to beyond.			
Best Music Direction	Fiddlers on the Thatch	English	Julius Packiam	₹ 10,000/-
Best Music Direction	Citation: For creating an ambience of music that effectively works also as part of the main narrative.			
Best Narration / Voice Over	The 18 Elephants – 3 Monologues	Malayalam	Balachandran Chullikkadu	₹ 10,000/- Each
Best Narration / Voice Over	Citation: For lending feel and depth to the agonies of elephants through his voice.			
Special Jury Award	The Lijjat Sisterhood	English	Kadhambari Chintamani (Director); Ajit Oommen (director)	₹ 2,500/- Each
Special Jury Award	Citation: For documenting the inspiring story of hundreds of women workers in the Lijjat papad making, selling and exporting. Through the first person interviews ranging from the oldest to the youngest, it is a vibrant narration of a unique experiment turned famously successful.			
Special Jury Award	Ek Aakash	Silent	Sudhakar Reddy (Director)	₹ 10,000/-
Special Jury Award	Citation: For starting off as a simple rivalry of two kids from different backgrounds – in kite flying, becomes a battle of one-upmanship. Both are led by their ego and aggressive instincts, but eventually reach a point when they need others help.			
Special Mention	Mangali – An Exorcision		Shilpi Dasgupta (Director)	Certificate Only
Special Mention	Citation: For the thoughtful and laudable craft that shaped the film.			Certificate Only
Special Mention	Water	English	Aseem Bose (Cameraman)	Certificate Only
Special Mention	Citation: For enhancing the impact of the film with his eloquent lens, that captures the spirit of the subject of the film.			Certificate Only

=== Best Writing on Cinema ===
The awards aim at encouraging study and appreciation of cinema as an art form and dissemination of information and critical appreciation of this art-form through publication of books, articles, reviews etc.

==== Juries ====
A committee headed by K. N. T. Sastry was appointed to evaluate the writing on Indian cinema. Following were the jury members:

- Jury Members
  - K. N. T. Sastry (chairperson) • Kodalli Shivaram • Aruna Anant Damle

==== Golden Lotus Award ====
Official Name: Swarna Kamal

All the awardees are awarded with 'Golden Lotus Award (Swarna Kamal)' and cash prize.

Name of Award	Name of Book	Language	Awardee(s)	Cash prize
Best Book on Cinema	Filmi Jagat Mein Ardhashakti Ka Romanch	Hindi	Author: Bharatiya Jnanpith; Publisher: Ramakrishna	₹ 15,000/- Each
Best Book on Cinema	Citation: For a unique style of chronicling the flip side of film personality through his own biography. It gives an insight into the history of cinema and film journalism in a refreshingly different style			
Best Film Critic			Saibal Chatterjee	₹ 15,000/-
Best Film Critic	Citation: For incisive, bold and realistic criticism of the film industry couched in a refreshing style of writing.			

==== Special Mention ====
All the award winners are awarded with Certificate of Merit.

Name of Award	Name of Book	Language	Awardee(s)	Cash prize
Special Mention (Book on Cinema)	Kathapurush	Bengali	Author: Deepankar Mukhopadhyay	Certificate Only
Special Mention (Book on Cinema)	Citation: For a commendable revelation of the personality of the filmmaker (Mrinal Sen).			Certificate Only
Special Mention (Book on Cinema)	Chalanchitra Nirdeshaka	Kannada	Author: P. N. Srinivas	Certificate Only
Special Mention (Book on Cinema)	Citation: For a unique presentation of the technicalities of film-making and international film personalities.			Certificate Only
Special Mention (Film Critic)		Telugu	Vasiraju Prakasham	Certificate Only
Special Mention (Film Critic)	Citation: For introducing film personalities of parallel cinema in the parched atmosphere of Telugu filmdom.			Certificate Only

=== Awards not given ===
Following were the awards not given as no film was found to be suitable for the award:

- Best Feature Film in Manipuri
- Best Feature Film in Punjabi
- Best Biographical Film
- Best Non-Feature Film on Family Welfare
