= Pallavi Subhash =

Indian actress

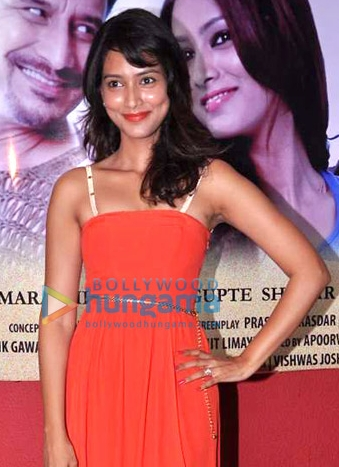
- Pallavi Subhash in 2013
- Born: 9 June 1984 (age 42); Mumbai, Maharashtra, India
- Occupations: Model, Actress, television personality
- Years active: 2001–present
- Known for: Karam Apnaa Apnaa; Cadbury Kuch Meetha Ho Jaye ad; Mahabharat; Chakravartin Ashoka Samrat; Naruda Donoruda; Bimba Devi alias Yashodhara
- Awards: Golden Petal Award Distinguished Achievement Award

Pallavi Subhash Shirke (born 9 June 1984) is an Indian actress. A model turned actress, she began her career in Marathi plays, films and TV shows and later appeared in Hindi TV shows. She has worked in various Telugu, Kannada, Marathi, Sinhala films. She is known for her roles as Dharma in the television show Chakravartin Ashoka Samrat (2015–2016), and as Yasodhara - the wife of Prince Siddhartha - in the film Bimba Devi Alias Yashodhara (2018).

== Career ==
=== Television ===
After completing her B.Com., Pallavi Shirke wanted to pursue law and become an advocate like her grandfather but she got an offer from the director Kedar Shinde to play a role in the Marathi play Tu Tu Mee Mee and from here her career in the television industry started. She worked in various Marathi plays, films, ads and TV shows. She appeared in the Marathi serials Char Divas Sasuche on ETV Marathi and Adhuri Ek Kahani on Zee Marathi. In 2003 she acted alongside Shreyas Talpade in Marathi TV show Ek Hota Raja. Subhash debuted with the Hindi serial Tumhari Disha. She was noticed by Ekta Kapoor in that serial and in 2006 got selected for the next Hindi serial, Karam Apnaa Apnaa produced by Balaji Telefilms. In this she played the central role of Gauri, a middle class Bengali girl, for her performance she was nominated for the Indian Telly Award for Fresh New Face in 2007.

From 2007 to 2008 she played a negative role of Meera in Balaji Telefilms's Kasamh Se. For her role in this show she was nominated for the Indian Telly Award for Best Actress in a Negative Role in 2008.

From 2008 to 2009 Pallavi Subhash played a role of Sneha Ahuja in television series Aathvaan Vachan aired on Sony Entertainment Television. In 2008 she also participated in dance reality show Tyohaar Dhamaka on entertainment channel 9x with Shubhangi Atre and Jay Bhanushali in her team.

She worked in the serial Basera aired on Imagine TV in which she was seen as Ketaki Sanghvi. in 2009.

She later acted in Godh Bharaai in which she has a chance to play her age, but it did badly and was pulled off air.

In 2011 she played a role of a character of her age opposite Sandeep Kulkarni in Zee Marathi's daily soap Guntata Hriday He by Satish Rajwade.

In 2013 she played the role of Rukmini in the mythological series Mahabharat by Siddharth Kumar Tewary. She was earlier supposed to play the role of Princess Amba in the series, but had to opt out of it because her prior commitments clashed with the shoot of the show.

From 2015 to 2016 she played the role of Subhadrangi in the historical series Chakravartin Ashoka Samrat. Her role was of Ashoka's mother and Bindusara's second wife.

In 2018 she play a role of Aruna in Indian Hindi horror anthology television series Kaun Hai? in the story title 'Mother'.

=== Films ===
In 2003 Pallavi Subhash starred alongside Vijay Patkar in the Marathi movie Polisachi Bayko directed by Mansingh Pawar. Its a comedy drama film in which a submissive policeman who likes to keep his boss happy is stunned when his wife lands a better-paying job, written by Omkar.

She made her film debut in 2005 in the Marathi film Kunku Zale Vairi directed by Nagesh Darak and she was nominated for the 'Best Actress Zee Gaurav Award' for her performance in the film. She also played a role in Mandar Shinde's comedy Marathi film No Problem in the same year where Navin Prabhakar, Jeetendra Joshi and Savita Malpekar were in the lead role.

Subhash played a lead role in Manoj Palrecha's 2006 Marathi film Sage Soyare alongside Sonali Kulkarni, Pankaj Vishnu and Vilas Ujawane. In the same year she also starred alongside Ankush Chaudhari, Jitendra Joshi, Sushant Shellar, Yatin Karyekar, Shakuntala Nare and Amit Phalke in the Marathi film Aaila Re!! directed by Deepak Naidu.

In 2008 classic Marathi movie Mee Sansar Mandite directed by Vishwanath Chauhan released. In this film Subhash starred alongside Alka Kubal-Aathalye, Ashok Shinde, Ravindra Berde and Suhasini Deshpande.

After seven years she made a comeback to films with three Marathi projects, Atul Kale's Asa Mee Ashi Tee opposite Sachit Patil, Tejas Deoskar's Premsutra opposite Sandeep Kulkarni and Gashmeer Mahajani's Dhava Dhava Khun Khun. Asa Mee Ashi Tee and Premsutra were romantic films. In the former she played an urban career oriented Punjabi girl for which she had to speak Marathi with a Punjabi accent and a Goan Catholic girl named Saniya in the latter. She had shot for two films in the past with actor Sachit Patil but both the films didn't make it to the theaters. She also acted in a Tamil film Om with Arjun Sarja. and then in a Kannada film Rascal but both could not be released.

In 2014 Subhash appeared in Sachin Kundalkar’s film Happy Journey. In this film Atul Kulkarni and Priya Bapat were in the lead roles and the film grossed nearly ₹4Crore (US$560,000) at the box office.

She was signed as the female lead for Gautham Vasudev Menon's next Tamil film Achcham Yenbadhu Madamaiyada opposite Silambarasan, but couldn't continue allot bulk dates to the film and was replaced by Manjima Mohan.

In 2015 she acted in Puneeth Rajkumar’s 25th film Chakravyuha (2016 film) directed by M. Saravanan. It is an Indian Kannada language film. When Saravanan saw the rushes on the editing table, he wasn't impressed. He wanted a character who knew the language better. Saravanam replaced Subhash with Kannada girl Rachita Ram. Subhash shot for a couple of days for this film.

Subhash made her debut in the Telugu film industry in 2016, she starred alongside Sumanth and Tanikella Bharani in Mallik Ram's romantic comedy film Naruda Donoruda. This film is a Telugu remake of 2012 Hindi film Vicky Donor.

In 2018 Subhash made her debut in Sinhala language and she played her first title role opposite Indian actor Arpit Choudhary in Prof. Sunil Ariyaratne’s film Bimba Devi Alias Yashodhara. The film is a Sri Lankan Sinhala language, epic, biographical drama written and directed by Prof. Ariyaratne. This historical biographical film depicts the life of Princess Yaśodharā, the wife of Prince Siddhartha. Subhash was honoured with a Distinguished Achievement Award on 12 October 2018 at the Annual Gala Dinner and Awards nights of SAFAL 2018 in Sydney, Australia, for her contribution to the film. She is the only Marathi actress who has worked in not only all south Indian languages but also in Sinhala language. This film won the award for the Highest Grossing Film of the Year 2018 in Sri Lanka at the Seventh Derana Lux Film Awards 2019.

Thereafter she performed a significant role in Rajesh Chavan’s 2018 Marathi film Ghar Hota Menacha. Where Siddharth Jadhav, Alka Kubal, Mohan Joshi and Avinash Narkar featured as lead characters.

In 2019 Subhash starred alongside Milind Gunaji and Sainkeet Kamat in the Marathi film Miranda House directed by Rajendra Talak.

In 2022 she starred alongside Hemal Ranasinghe and Ajmal Ameer in Indian-Sri Lankan bilingual horror thriller film Second Show directed by A.T. Gnanam.

=== Modelling ===
Subhash is a model for TV advertisements for products like Lion Date Jam, Everest Gharam Masala, Lifebouy, 3 roses and others. She became a very popular model for TV advertisements in 2012 and 2013. She received praise for her work in the "Meethe mein kuch meetha ho jaaye" ad campaign for Cadbury's after which she was referred to as the 'Cadbury girl'. In 2019 she has done ad campaigns for VGN Victoria Park, The Chennai Shopping Mall and Sri Mahalakshmi Silks.

== Filmography ==
=== Television ===
Year	Show	Language	Role
2001	Char Divas Sasuche	Marathi	
2003	Ek Hota Raja	Marathi	Ena
2003	Saheb Bibi Aani Me	Marathi	Manva Deshpande
2004–2006	Tumhari Disha	Hindi	Preeta
2006–2009	Karam Apnaa Apnaa	Hindi	Gauri Chatterjee / Gauri Kapoor
2006-2007	Adhuri Ek Kahani	Marathi	Neerja Shah
2007–2008	Kasamh Se	Hindi	Meera Khandelwal / Meera Walia
2008–2009	Aathvaan Vachan	Hindi	Sneha Ahuja
2008	Tyohaar Dhamaka	Hindi	Participant
2009	Basera	Hindi	Ketki Sanghvi
2010	Godh Bharaai	Hindi	Aastha
2011	Guntata Hriday He	Marathi	Ananya
2011	Aahat	Hindi	Shipra
2012	Comedy Express	Marathi	Anchor
2002	Shriyut Gangadhar Tipre	Marathi	
2013–2014	Mahabharat	Hindi	Rukmini
2014	Comedy Chi Bullet Train	Marathi	
2015–2016	Chakravartin Ashoka Samrat	Hindi	Shubadrangi/ Maharani Dharma
2018	Kaun Hai?	Hindi	Aruna

=== Films ===
Year	Movie	Role	Language	Notes
2003	Polisachi Bayko	Sita Desai	Marathi	
2005	No Problem	Nanda	Marathi	
2005	Kunku Zale Vairi	Kamal A. Maane Patil	Marathi	
2006	Sage Soyare		Marathi	
2006	Tuza Maza Jamena		Marathi	
2006	Aaila Re!!	Nisha	Marathi	
2008	Mee Sansar Mandite	Meena	Marathi	
2008	Om		Tamil	
2008	C Kkompany		Hindi	
2008	Rascal		Kannada	
2013	Premsutra	Saniya	Marathi	
2013	Asa Mee Ashi Tee	Akshara	Marathi	
2013	Dhava Dhava Khun Khun		Marathi	
2014	Happy Journey	Alice	Marathi	
2016	Naruda Donoruda	Ashima Roy	Telugu	Debut in Tollywood
2018	Bimba Devi alias Yashodhara	Yashodhara	Sinhala	Debut in Sri Lankan Films
2018	Ghar Hota Menacha	Varsha	Marathi	
2019	Miranda House	Priya	Marathi	
2022	Second Show	Sandhya	Sinhala, Tamil	Indo-Sri Lankan Film

=== Television advertisements ===
Year	Advertisement	Language	Ref.
	Lagu Bandhu Jewellery	Marathi	
	Roopmangal Jewellers	Hindi	
	Ponvandu Soaps	Tamil	
2009	Preethi Primo		
2010	Women's Horlicks - Jee lo thoda extra	Hindi	
2010	Maggi - Coconut Milk Powder	Malayalam	
2010	Livon Hair Gain Tonic	Hindi	
2010	GRT Platinum	English	
2011	Lifebuoy - 10 infection-causing germs, one solution	Hindi	
2011	Vasan Dental Care		
2011	Kwality Walls	Hindi	
2011	Cadbury Dairy Milk - Meethe mein kuch meetha ho jaaye	Hindi	
2012	The Tree House	Hindi	
2012	Women's Horlicks - Main Badal Rahi Hu	Hindi	
2012	Vipul Salunkhe PNG Jewellers Pune	Marathi	
2012	Cardia Life	Tamil	
2012	Gokul Sandiva Fairness Cream	Tamil	
2012	Udhaya Krishna Ghee		
2013	Lion Dates Jam		
2013	Nutrela - Roz Kuch Naya, Roz Kuch Soya	Hindi	
2013	IndusInd Bank - My Account, My Number	Hindi	
2013	Sathya Parkanum Parkanum	Tamil	
2013	ATV Gold Cup Tea		
2014	GRT Jewellers - Wedding & Celebration Collection	Hindi	
2014	Urban Tree - Homes you will never want to leave	English	
2014	NKGSB Bank	Marathi	
2014	Tata Sky	Tamil	
2014	Samsung Microwave Slim Fry	Hindi	
2014	Divine Noni	Kannada	
2014	Appollo Sellappas Gold Jewellery	Tamil	
2015	Surf Excel Easy Wash	Hindi	
2015	Woodwards Gripe Water - FirstCry	Hindi	
2015	MTR Masala	Telugu	
2016	ELTECH Washing Machine		
2016	108 Ambulance Service, NHM Maharashtra	Hindi	
2016	SVTM Jewels	Tamil	
2016	Hapima - Crispy Fry Mix for Veggies		
2016	Globus Nakshatra	Tamil	
2017	RamRaj Romex Banian		
2017	Apsara Pencil		
2017	Aashirvaad Spices - Zyada dum lage kam	Hindi	
2018	Dettol - Maa mane dettol ka dhula	Hindi	
2018	Sri Lalitha Rice		
2019	SKM Best Egg White Cube		
2019	The Spicy Kitchen Xpress Red Chilli Powder	Hindi	
2019	VGN Victoria Park		
2019	Sri Mahalakshmi Silks		
2019	The Chennai Shopping Mall		

== Awards and nominations ==
Year	Award	Category	Show/Film	Result	Ref.
2007	Indian Telly Award	Fresh New Face	Karam Apnaa Apnaa	Nominated	
2008	Indian Telly Award	Best Actress in a Negative Role - Female	Kasamh Se	Nominated	
2015	BIG Star Entertainment Awards	Most Entertaining Television Actor – Female	Chakravartin Ashoka Samrat	Nominated	
2015	Indian Telly Award	Best Actress in a Supporting Role (Drama)	Chakravartin Ashoka Samrat	Nominated	
2016	Colors Golden Petal Awards	Best Actress in a Supporting Role	Chakravartin Ashoka Samrat	Won	
