= List of Indian films of 1991 =

Provided below is the list of Indian films released on 1991.

== Box office collection ==
The list of highest-grossing Indian films released in 1991, by worldwide box office gross revenue, are as follows:

*	Denotes films still running in cinemas worldwide

Highest worldwide gross of 1991
Rank	Title	Director	Language	Worldwide gross	Ref
1	Saajan	Lawrence D'Souza	Hindi	₹18 crore (US$2.1 million)	
2	Hum	Mukul S. Anand	Hindi	₹16.8 crore (US$2.0 million)	
3	Saudagar	Subhash Ghai	Hindi	₹15.75 crore (US$1.9 million)	
4	Yodha	Rahul Rawail	Hindi	₹12.5 crore (US$1.5 million)	
5	Maherchi Sadi	Vijay Kondke	Marathi	₹12 crore (US$1.4 million)	
6	Henna	Raj Kapoor; Randhir Kapoor	Hindi	₹12 crore (US$1.4 million)	
7	Phool Aur Kaante	Kuku Kohli	Hindi	₹11.75 crore (US$1.4 million)–₹12 crore (US$1.4 million)	
8	Sadak	Mahesh Bhatt	Hindi	₹10.75 crore (US$1.3 million)–₹10.8 crore (US$1.3 million)	
9	Thalapathi	Mani Ratnam	Tamil	₹10.60 crore (US$1.3 million)	
10	Sanam Bewafa	Saawan Kumar Tak	Hindi	₹10.25 crore (US$1.2 million)	

== Lists of Indian films of 1991 ==
- List of Bengali films of 1991
- List of Gujarati films of 1991
- List of Hindi films of 1991
- List of Kannada films of 1991
- List of Malayalam films of 1991
- List of Marathi films of 1991
- List of Odia films of 1991
- List of Punjabi films of 1991
- List of Tamil films of 1991
- List of Telugu films of 1991

Preceded by 1990	Indian films 1991	Succeeded by 1992
