= List of Marathi films of 1991 =

A list of films produced by the Marathi language film industry based in Maharashtra in the year 1991.

== 1991 Releases ==
A list of Marathi films released in 1991.

Year	Film	Director	Cast	Notes	Source
1991	Maherchi Sadi	Vijay Kondke	Alka Kubal, Ajinkya Dev, Ramesh Bhatkar, Vikram Gokhale	Remade in Hindi as Saajan Ka Ghar	
1991	Anpekshit	Sanjeev Naik	Nitish Bhardwaj, Archana Joglekar, Ashok Saraf, Sudhir Dalvi		
1991	Z. P.	Anant Mane	Sadashiv Amrapurkar, Bhalchandra Kulkarni, Jairam Kulkarni, Raj Shekhar, Dinkar Inamdar		
1991	Bandalbaaz	N. S. Vaidya	Vijay Chavan, Prashant Damle, Alka Kubal, Kishori Shahane, Mohan Joshi, Laxmikant Berde		
1991	Mumbai Te Mauritius	Satish Ranadive	Laxmikant Berde, Sudhir Dalvi, Jayshree Gadkar, Ashok Saraf, Varsha Usgaonkar		
1991	Shame To Shame	Purushottam Berde	Laxmikant Berde, Priya Arun, Deepak Shirke, Vijay Chavan		
1991	Balidaan	Raam Shetty	Ashok Saraf, Master Amit, Vijay Chavan,, Ajit Deshpande		
1991	Aflatoon	Girish Ghanekar	Laxmikant Berde, Sudhir Joshi, Ashok Saraf		
1991	Bandhan	Anant Mane	Ramesh Bhatkar, Ajinkya Deo, Asha Kale		
1991	Jeeva Sakha	Ramesh Deo	Ajinkya Deo, Sachin Khedekar, Seema Deo, Laxmikant Berde, Ashutosh Gowarikar, Mahesh Manjrekar, Kishori Shahane		
1991	Yeda Ki Khula	Datta Keshav	Priya Arun, Laxmikant Berde, Alka Kubal		
1991	Jasa Baap Tashi Poore	Madanmohan Khade	Suhas Bhalekar, Ajinkya Deo, Avinash Kharshikar		
1991	Godi Gulabi	V. K. Naik	Ashok Saraf, Laxmikant Berde, Rekha Rao, Shekhar Naik, Sudhir Joshi, Jairam Kulkarni		
1991	Chaukat Raja	Sanjay Surkar	Sulabha Deshpande, Dilip Kulkarni, Dilip Prabhavalkar		
1991	Aayatya Gharat Gharoba	Sachin Pilgaonkar	Sachin Pilgaonkar, Ashok Saraf, Laxmikant Berde		
