= Aai Majhi Kalubai =

2020 Indian Marathi-language TV series

- Genre: Social drama Thriller; Devotional
- Written by: Shirish Latkar
- Directed by: Vighnesh Kamble; Bhimrao Mude
- Starring: See below
- Theme music composer: Prakash Chavan
- Country of origin: India
- No. of episodes: 285

Production
- Producers: Alka Kubal; Sameer Athalye
- Production location: Satara, Maharashtra
- Editor: Milind Narkar
- Camera setup: Multi-camera
- Running time: 22 minutes
- Production company: Kashturisha Arts

Original release
- Network: Sony Marathi
- Release: 14 September 2020 – 15 August 2021

Aai Majhi Kalubai (transl. My Mother Kalubai) is an Indian Marathi language TV series which aired on Sony Marathi. It premiered from 14 September 2020 and ended on 15 August 2021. It starred Alka Kubal, Rashmi Anpat and Vivek Sangle in lead roles.

== Plot ==
Aarya is a 21-year-old girl described as beautiful, scatterbrained, and naughty, but also genuine and clean-hearted. She believes in meeting new people and making new friends. According to the show's description, her positivity amazes everyone, and there is a spark in her appearance and character for a special reason: Aarya is born because of the blessings of Goddess Kalubai. The story is described as showing how Goddess Kalubai stands behind a common devotee and makes her divine miracle.

== Cast ==
=== Main ===
- Alka Kubal as Goddess Kalubai / Gaura
- Prajakta Gaikwad / Veena Jagtap / Rashmi Anpat as Aarya Amogh Patil (née Purohit)
- Vivek Sangle as Amogh Raje Patil

=== Recurring ===
Amogh's family

- Ashalata Wabgaonkar / Shakuntala Nare / Smita Oak as Vasundhara Hamberao Patil
- Prasanna Ketkar as Madhav Raje Patil
- Manjusha Godse as Shalini Madhav Patil
- Sangram Salvi as Milind Raje Patil
- Janhavi Killekar as Malati Milind Patil
- Ketaki Patil as Susheela Patil
- Aniket Kelkar as Surendra Raje Patil
- Kalpana Jagtap as Vandana Surendra Patil

Aarya's family

- Sharad Ponkshe as Purohit
- Prajakta Dighe as Anita Purohit
- Leena Athavale-Datar as Manda
- Parth Ketkar as Sanket Purohit

Others

- Milind Shinde as Virat
- Shilpa Thakre / Rujuta Dharap as Sai
