= Nadi Vahate =

- Directed by: Sandeep Sawant
- Written by: Sandeep Sawant
- Produced by: Sandeep Sawant; Neeraja Patwardhan
- Starring: Vasant Josalkar; Poonam Shetgaonkar; Asha Shelar; Hridaynath Jadhav; Jayant Gadekar; Abhishekh Aanan
- Cinematography: Sanjay K. Memane
- Edited by: Neeraj Voralia
- Production company: Sahaj Film Private Limited
- Release date: 22 September 2017 (India)
- Running time: 115 minutes
- Country: India
- Language: Marathi

Nadi Vahate (English: River Flows) or Nadi Vaahate is a 2017 Indian Marathi-language feature film written and directed by Sandeep Sawant. It was scheduled to be theatrically released on 22 September 2017.

== Plot ==
The story follows the relationship between a river and people along its banks with respect to their life, needs, desires and greed.

== Credits ==
- Production Designer (Art & Costumes): Neeraja Patwardhan
- Sync sound & Sound Design: Suhas Rane
- Sound design & Sound mixing: Mandar Kamalapurkar
- Editor: Neeraj Voralia
- Background Music: Tushar Kamat & Jairaj Joshi

== Cast ==
- Vasant Josalkar as Guruj
- Poonam Shetgaonkar as Anagha
- Asha Shelar as Anagha's Mother
- Hridaynath Jadhav as Bhau
- Jayant Gadekar as Appa Naik
- Abhishekh Aanand as Akash
- Shivkumar Subramaniam as Project Head
- Gajanan Zarmekar as Prakash
- Mahadev Sawant as Tukaram
- Vishnupad Barve as Mangesh
- Bhushan Vikas as Mr. Kachre

== Production ==
=== Development ===
After the appreciated 2004 Marathi film Shwaas, which won the National Film Award for Best Feature Film and was also India's official submission for the Academy Awards for Best Foreign Language Film, Sawant produced Nadi Vahate after four years of research.

=== Filming ===
The film has been shot in Kudal, Dodamarg and Sawantwadi talukas of Sindhudurga along the foothills of the Western Ghats and Valpoi, Sakhali and Sattari in North Goa.

== Reception ==
=== Critical reception ===
Emma Colvan wrote "The film is an apt illustration of the relations of power and inequality that often coalescence around water and other resources, as well as the tensions between urban money and rural life. Notably, the film brings together current concerns over the impacts of land acquisition on local communities, and the cultural and ecological impacts wrought by land use change." Ganesh Matkari of Pune Mirror wrote "The film avoids spoon-feeding and the plot unfolds from the perspective of the operatives, as each new piece of information is revealed. This strategy works very well in the pre-interlude episodes and we easily sympathize with the protagonists' plight. The second half relies more on discussion about the problem and possible solutions. Nadi Vahate doesn't just try to use stereotypical characters, relationships or situations to make it audience-friendly but instead, it takes issues very seriously and avoids a simplistic approach or easy solutions. The ending of the film is a bit ambiguous and would not be conventionally satisfying. But that is exactly the point. Keeping things in perspective requires avoiding a good or dramatically tragic climax. Sandeep Sawant, who has also written the film and composed it masterfully, has to be credited for maintaining the tone of the film."

== Accolades ==
This film has won Special Jury award for the director Sandeep Sawant at 2017 Pune International Film Festival, and Special Jury Award at 2017 Zee Chitragaurav. Nadi Vahate also won "Screen National Award" at Goa Marathi Film festival.
