= Ashalata =

Ashalata is a given name. People with the name include:

- Ashalata Wabgaonkar
- Ashalata Dinanath Mangeshkar
- Ashalata Devi Loitongbam
- Ashalata Biswas
- Ashalata Baidya
- Ashalata Sen
