= Maherchi Sadi =

- Theatrical release poster
- Directed by: Vijay Kondke
- Written by: Annasaheb Deulgaonkar
- Produced by: Vijay Kondke
- Starring: Alka Kubal; Ajinkya Deo; Ashalata; Ramesh Bhatkar; Vikram Gokhale
- Cinematography: Charudatta Dukhande
- Music by: Anil Mohile
- Production company: Jyoti Pictures
- Release date: 18 September 1991
- Running time: 139 minutes
- Country: India
- Language: Marathi
- Budget: ₹25 lakh
- Box office: ₹12 crore

Maherchi Sadi (transl. Sari from the Maternal house) is a 1991 Indian Marathi-language family drama film produced and directed by Vijay Kondke (Nephew of the late Marathi film legend, Dada Kondke). The film stars Alka Kubal, Usha Nadkarni, Ramesh Bhatkar, Vijay Chavan and Ajinkya Deo played pivotal roles. The film grossed over ₹12 crore (US$1.5 million) in its first three months of release, making it the fifth highest-grossing Indian film of 1991 as well as highest-grossing Marathi film of that time. Maherchi Sadi ran at Prabhat Talkies for more than two years.

Maherchi Sadi ran for more than two years at iconic Prabhat Talkies. It is an Official remake of the hugely successful Gujarati film Mahiyar Ni Chundadi (1983), which was also later remade in Hindi as Saajan Ka Ghar in 1994 starring Juhi Chawla and Rishi Kapoor.

== Plot ==
Yashwant (Vikram Gokhale), a guy not rolling in money but always wanting more, holds a grudge against his newborn daughter, Laxmi (Alka Kubal). He blames her for his wife's death during childbirth, even though he hits the jackpot with a lottery win right at her birth. Instead of being grateful, he distances himself from Laxmi, leaving her in the care of a maid, Rukma (Shanta Inamdar). Yashwant remarries and has a son named Vicky (Ajinkya Deo).

Despite being mistreated by her father and stepmother (Ashalata Wabgaonkar), Laxmi shares a special bond with her half-brother Vicky. Their connection stands out in a family that's not very warm. Yashwant and his wife believe Laxmi is bad luck, and this belief shapes how they treat her. Vicky, however, sees beyond these superstitions and tries to protect his sister.

As the story unfolds, Vicky's compassion clashes with his mother's orders to stay away from Laxmi. On Raksha Bandhan, Vicky defies his family to visit Laxmi and receive a rakhi from her. Sadly, tragedy strikes when Vicky has a life-changing accident, and his mother blames Laxmi, subjecting her to physical abuse.

To shake off the perceived bad luck Laxmi brings, Yashwant and his wife arrange her marriage to Ramesh (Ramesh Bhatkar), an army officer. On the day of her marriage, Yashwant faces a huge loss as his mill catches fire. Vicky makes him realize that Laxmi brought luck when she entered their lives but took it away when she left.

Yashwant's life takes a tragic turn as he dies in an accident while on his way to see his burning mill. Meanwhile, Laxmi, facing constant hardships, suffers a miscarriage. The doctor warns Ramesh that Laxmi's life is at risk if she gets pregnant again, but Ramesh decides not to tell anyone, including Laxmi, to spare her pain.

Things take a darker turn when Ramesh's mother (Usha Nadkarni) plots to kill Laxmi, thinking she can't have children. Unaware of this, Laxmi overhears Ramesh talking about the miscarriage and decides to have a child, even if it means risking her life. Ramesh, provoked by Laxmi, forgets about the danger and spends the night with her.

When Ramesh is away, his mother kicks Laxmi out of the house. Homeless and pregnant, Laxmi seeks refuge in the village, where she gives birth to a baby boy on her own. As her health deteriorates, Ramesh returns just in time to see Laxmi take her last breath. The family, now regretful of mistreating her, gathers around her funeral pyre, realizing too late the impact she could have had on their lives.

== Cast ==
- Alka Kubal as Laxmi
- Ajinkya Deo as Vicky; Laxmi's stepbrother
- Ramesh Bhatkar as Pradeep; Laxmi's husband
- Vikram Gokhale as Yashwant; Laxmi's father
- Ashalata as Tarabai; Laxmi's stepmother
- Kishori Shahane as Bijli; Vicky's love interest
- Usha Nadkarni as Sasu; Laxmi's mother-in-law
- Shanta Inamdar as Rakhma, Laxmi's adoptive mother
- Vijay Chavan as Baja; Laxmi's neighbour
- Charusheela Sable as Rangu; Laxmi's neighbour
- Jayshree Gadkar as Sushila; Laxmi's mother (Guest appearance)

== Production ==
=== Development ===
Dada Kondke had planned for his nephew, Vijay Kondke, to take over his production company. Vijay decided to remake a Rajasthani film based on its story and approached Mahesh Kothare to direct the project.

At the time, Mahesh and his father, Amber Kothare, met Dada to discuss the film. Mahesh agreed to direct it only on the condition that Dada Kondke would act in the lead role. Dada declined, as he wished to appear only in a co-starring role. Mahesh then withdrew from the project, stating that no other actor could do justice to Dada’s part.

After failing to secure another director, Vijay Kondke ultimately decided to direct the film himself.

=== Casting ===
Bhagyashree was initially offered the role by Kondke, but she declined due to scheduling conflicts. The following month, it was reported that Alka Kubal was in talks to play Laxmi after being approached by Annasaheb Deulgaonkar. Ajinkya Deo was cast in the role of Vicky.

Usha Nadkarni was selected to portray Laxmi’s mother-in-law, a role that was also considered for Shashikala. Ramesh Bhatkar was approached to play Laxmi’s husband, while Kishori Shahane was cast in a supporting role.

== Release ==
The film was released on 18 September 1991 in India and had a remarkable 75 week run in theaters. It screened for nearly two years at Prabhat Talkies. Maherchi Sadi earned ₹6 crore in its first three months and eventually grossed ₹12 crore by the end of its theatrical run. However Sakal reported the film earned 12 crore mark after three months of release.

== Soundtrack ==
The film's music and soundtrack album is composed by Anil Mohile. Asha bhosle, uttara kelkar, Suresh wadkar, Sudhir Phadke sung the songs.

=== Track list ===
Following table shows list of tracks and respective duration in the film.

Track #	Song	Artist	Duration
1	"Aaj Lakshmicha Rup Kasa Disat Sajir"	Uttara Kelkar	4:07
2	"Bhavasathi Dhava Karate, Aaee Aambe Jagdambe"	Asha Bhosle	5:04
3	"Dubhangli Dharani Mata, Phatale Aakash Ga"	Sudhir Phadke	8:22
4	"Dubhangli Dharani Mata, Phatale Aakash Ga (2)"	Sudhir Phadke	1:21
5	"Kal Sapanamagi, Maza Sajana Ga"	Uttara Kelkar	5:30
6	"Maza Sonul Sonul Maza Chhakula Chhakula"	Asha Bhosle	4:24
7	"Sasarala Hi, Bahin Nigali"	Suresh Wadkar	7:18
