= Second Show (2022 film) =

2020 Indian-Sri Lankan film

- Sinhala: සෙකන්ඩ් ෂෝ
- Tamil: செக்கண்ட் ஷோ
- Directed by: A.T. Gnanam
- Written by: A.T. Gnanam
- Screenplay by: S. Mohan (Tamil); Thisara Imbulana (Sinhala)
- Story by: A.T. Gnanam
- Produced by: Siva Brothers; Dark Room Creations
- Starring: Ajmal Ameer; Pallavi Subhash; Hemal Ranasinghe; Vidya Pradeep
- Cinematography: L.K. Vijay
- Edited by: Rangis
- Music by: Verl Praneev
- Release date: 8 July 2022
- Countries: India, Sri Lanka
- Languages: Tamil, Sinhala

Second Show (theatrically as II_{nd} Show, (Sinhala: සෙකන්ඩ් ෂෝ) is a 2022 Indian-Sri Lankan co-produced bilingual horror thriller film directed by A.T. Gnanam in his directorial debut. It was co-produced by Siva Brothers' Mahadevan Ganesh and Saravanan with Dark Room Creations' Kaushalya Wickramasinghe. The film stars Ajmal Ameer, Pallavi Subhash and Hemal Ranasinghe in lead roles with Vidya Pradeep, Akshata Sonawane and Pooja Mondal in supporting roles.

The film's pre-release campaign began in May 2022 and it was released on 8 July 2022. The film's co-producer Kaushalya Wickramasinghe stated that the Tamil version of the film will be screened in 50 theaters across the island from 29 July 2022 and it will be shown as a distribution of the National Film Corporation.

The portions featuring Ajmal Ameer and Vidya Pradeep were shot in Tamil only and dubbed for the Sinhala version.

== Plot ==
Group of friends consisting of Shiva, Roshini, Deepika, Yogi and Dheena travel to London from Sri Lanka for their friend, Sandya's wedding. Sandya is about to marry Prasanna. At Prasanna's residence, Sandya share her love story to her friends. Prasanna throws a party at this residence. At the party, Prasanna's cousin is killed by Deepika. Jeeva, Prasanna's best friend and business partner, helps Sandya's friends to enjoy their stay in London. Deepika kills Dheena. Shiva suspects that the killings might be a work of a ghost. A priest is called to Prasanna's residence and the priest says that there is a ghost in the house confirming Shiva's suspicion. The ghost takes the form of a spider and it is revealed that the Ghost Spider bites Deepika to possess her and killed Prasanna's cousin and Dheena. Shiva and Roshini amend their strained relationship. The ghost possess deepika and kills Jeeva. Another priest visits Prasanna's residence and reveals Prasanna's ex-wife, Meera, is also from Sri Lanka, Prasanna is a drug addict, Prasanna abused his ex-wife and killed her. Prasanna agrees on what happened to Meera and reveal says that Meera was actually married ti his Twin Brother, Nanda. Prasanna also says that Nanda died by suicide and the death of Meera. The priest performs a ritual and captures the Ghost. Prasanna and Sandya are married and Shiva, Roshini, Deepika and Yogi travel from London to Sri Lanka. It is revealed that everything Prasanna said was a lie as he doesn't have a twin brother and Prasanna actually killed Meera. Meera's ghost possess Sandya and makes Prasanna to kill himself.

== Cast ==
- Ajmal Ameer as Shiva
- Pallavi Subhash as Sandya
- Hemal Ranasinghe as Prasanna
- Vidya Pradeep as Meera
- Akshata Sonawane as Roshini
- Puja Mondal as Deepika
- Maira Singh
- Isha Chhabra
- Black Pondy
- Inba Ravikumar as Yogi
- Sri Krish as Jeeva
- Suraj Nanda
- London Venkat
- Mukkur N. Ramajayam

== Production ==
This is the debut film of the main film director A.T. Gnanam and was filmed in 2019 in the locations of London and Birmingham, England. A.T. Gnanam is an Indian filmmaker and a screenwriter working in Tamil cinema. He has worked in many movies tele-films and worked as associate director and co-director of many movies. He also worked in the story discussion department of the Bollywood film, Chennai Express, under the story author and director, K Subash.

Second Show was filmed simultaneously in both Tamil and Sinhala, with the Tamil dialogues written by S. Mohan and the Sinhala dialogues written by film director Thisara Imbulana. Bhargavi Kalidas co-directed the film, with Thangaraj S. Sathyamoorthi helping as an assistant director. Vivek Fernando directed the film in Sri Lanka. As an Indo-Lankan co-production, the film not only shares both Indian and Sri Lankan film technicians, but it also stars artists from both countries: Sri Lankan actor Hemal Ranasinghe, Marathi actress Pallavi Subhash and Tamil actor Ajmal Ameer are a notable few in the movie. Other notable characters played are by Tamil actress Vidya Pradeep, Telugu actress Akshatha Sonawane and Gujarati model Pooja Mondal.

The music director of the movie, Ambi Subramaniam, and Praneev Verl, a Sri Lankan composer who composed two songs in the movie worked with lyricists Pa. Vijay, A.T. Gnanam, and Ambi Prabass, and singers Diwakar, Sathya Prakash, Deepak, Shrikanth, Saranya Gopinath, Bindu Subramaniam and Chinmayi, while Sri Krish, Suraj Nanda from Mauritius choreographed. The film also features songs in Sinhala sung by Kasun Kalhara, Uresha Ravihari, Kushani Sandareka, Kavindi Gunasekara and Dinendra Bandara.

The digital colour correction of the film is done by colourist Karthik Chandrasekar, with Vinaya Devv handling the outfits as the costume designer and Kall Premkumar as the art director.
