= Owalini =

Owalini - Marathi Movie
- Theatrical release poster
- Directed by: Dr. Babasaheb Powar
- Produced by: Medhpranav Babasaheb Powar
- Starring: Alka Kubal; Rajashekhar; Usha Naik; Chetan Dalvi; Alka Inamdar
- Music by: Bal Jamenish; Mahesh Hiremath
- Release date: 26 April 2002
- Country: India
- Language: Marathi

Owalini is a Marathi movie released on 26 April 2002. The movie is produced by Medhpranav Babasaheb Powar and directed by Dr. Babasaheb Powar.

== Cast ==
The cast includes Alka Kubal, Rajashekhar, Usha Naik, Chetan Dalvi, Alka Inamdar & Others.

== Soundtrack ==
The music is provided by Bal Jamenish and Mahesh Hiremath.
