= Mangla (film) =

2025 Indian Marathi-language biographical drama film

- Promotional poster
- Directed by: Aparana Hosing
- Written by: Story and Screenplay: Saurabh Choudhary; Dialogue: Prathmesh Shivalkar
- Based on: Seerat by Mangala Kapoor
- Produced by: Aparana Hosing; Yashna Murli; Mohan Poojary; Milind Phodkar
- Starring: Shivali Parab; Shashank Shende; Alka Kubal
- Cinematography: Arun Varma
- Edited by: Rahul Bhatankar
- Music by: Santanu Ghatak
- Production companies: Rash Production Pvt. Ltd. Fakt Ani Fakt Entertainment
- Distributed by: Sunshine Studios
- Release date: 17 January 2025
- Country: India
- Language: Marathi

Mangla is a 2025 Indian Marathi-language biographical drama film based on the life of acid attack survivor Dr. Mangala Kapoor. Directed and co-produced by Aparana Hosing, the film is also produced by Yashna Murli, Mohan Poojary, and Milind Phodkar under the banners of Rash Production Pvt. Ltd. and Fakt Ani Fakt Entertainment. The film features Shivali Parab in the lead role, portraying a character inspired by Kapoor, alongside Shashank Shende and Alka Kubal. The film delves into the remarkable journey of an acid attack survivor who overcame adversity, shedding light on her struggles during a time when no laws existed to address acid attacks.

The film was theatrically released on 17 January 2025. Upon release, it received critical acclaim for its performances, writing, and music.

== Plot ==
Set in 1975, the film tells the inspiring story of a woman who, after surviving a brutal acid attack, refuses to be defined by society's rejection and instead pursues her passion for music. Despite facing challenges in education and employment due to her disfigured face, Mangla's unwavering dedication to classical music drives her to earn a PhD and become a respected music teacher. Her powerful voice, often compared to that of Lata Mangeshkar, helps her rise above the prejudice she encounters. Mangla's journey is a profound testament to the strength of the human spirit, proving that true beauty lies in resilience and talent.

== Cast ==
- Shivali Parab as Mangla Deshpande
- Shashank Shende as Mukund Deshpande
- Alka Kubal as Suhasini Deshpande
- Adit Bhilare as Kailash
- Vishal Rathod
- Sanjeev Kumar Patil as Manohar
- Neeil Rajurikar as Shankar
- Sarika Jadhav as professor
- Vaishnavi Sanas as professor's daughter

== Production ==
The film was officially announced in July 2024 with a poster featuring a girl seen from behind, along with a tanpura, a traditional musical instrument.

== Release and reception ==
On 8 September 2024, the team unveiled the film's poster featuring Shivali Parab at Lalbaugcha Raja in Mumbai. Initially, the film was set to release on 10 January 2025, coinciding with the release of Subodh Bhave's Sangeet Manpamaan, but the release date was later postponed to 17 January 2025, a week later.

=== Critical response ===
Kalpeshraj Kubal, a critic from Maharashtra Times, gave Mangala 3 out of 5 stars, praising the film overall. He said, "Films that inspire us to see life from a new perspective deserve to be experienced, and Mangala is undoubtedly one of them." Santosh Bhingarde of Sakal highlighted the performances, music, and writing as the film's strongest aspects and wrote, "Although there are some flaws in this film, it is better to ignore it considering this serious incident."
