= Basera (2009 TV series) =

- Created by: Sagar Arts
- Starring: See below
- Opening theme: Javed Ali and Pamela Jain
- Country of origin: India
- Original language: Hindi
- No. of episodes: 79

Production
- Producer: Sagar Arts
- Running time: 24 minutes

Original release
- Network: NDTV Imagine
- Release: 17 August – 3 December 2009

Basera (transl. Residence) is an Indian soap opera that aired on NDTV Imagine. It aired from 17 August 2009 to 3 December 2009 and starred Ram Kapoor and Pallavi Subhash.

== Plot ==
The story about is how old couples are treated in many families; how they cope with disregard from their children; and how they overcome life's challenges.

== Cast ==
Actor	Character
Ram Kapoor	Keshubhai Sanghvi
Pallavi Subhash	Ketki Sanghvi
Pallavi Purohit	Urvashi Sanghvi
Madhvi Gogte	Gauriben Sanghvi
Yash Dasgupta	Ketan Sanghvi
Puneet Soni	Mehul Sanghvi
Damini Anand	Kritika Sanghvi
Meenal Patel	Devkiben
Akshay Anand	Aatish Parikh
Resham Tipnis	Rasili Parikh
Priya Bathija	Nandini Parikh
Amit Jain	Shantanu Malhotra
Suzzana Mukherjee	Ujjwala Parikh
Rajesh Shringarpure	Sachin Deshmukh
Supriya Pilgaonkar	Manda Deshmukh
Ankit Mohan	Niti
Preet Saluja	Jatin Deshmukh
Sahil Chaddha	Waqar Ahmed
Neelu Kohli	Jannat
Faizal Raza Khan	Imam Ahmed
Tarun Madan	Faizaan
Roshani Shetty	Sunaina Manchanda
Nandish Sandhu/ Ajay Krish	Harsh Manchanda
Raj Lathia	Anuraag Manchanda
