= Gharkul Punha Hasave =

- Directed by: Arun Karnataki
- Screenplay by: Raja Pargaonkar
- Story by: J.K. Bihari
- Produced by: Suresh Bhagat
- Starring: Alka Kubal; Priya Arun; Ramesh Bhatkar; Sudhir Joshi; Laxmikant Berde
- Cinematography: Prashant Pai
- Edited by: Lini Shrivastav
- Production company: Crystal Films
- Release date: 1989
- Country: India
- Language: Marathi

Gharkul Punha Hasave is an Indian Marathi-language film directed by Arun Karnataki and produced by Suresh Bhagat. The film stars Alka Kubal, Priya Arun, Ramesh Bhatkar, Sudhir Joshi, Laxmikant Berde.

== Cast ==
- Alka Kubal
- Priya Arun
- Ramesh Bhatkar
- Chandu Parkhi
- Sudhir Joshi
- Laxmikant Berde
- Shashikant Shirsekar
- Vilasraj
- Priyanka
- Prajakta
- Ashok Saxena
- Mickey Sagar
- Chandrasekhar
- Srikanth Saple
- Raman Kaval
- Pratiksha
- Amol

== Soundtrack ==
Gharkul Punha Hasave

Soundtrack album by Arun Paudwal
- Released: 1989
- Genre: Feature film soundtrack
- Language: Marathi
- Label: Crystal Films

The soundtrack album is composed by Arun Paudwal and Anuradha Paudwal, Vinay Mandake provide score.

=== Track listing ===
Music director: Arun Paudwal
| No. | Title | Singer (s) | Ref(s) |
|---|---|---|---|
| 1 | "Ye Rani Ye Na" | Vinay Mandke, Anuradha Paudwal | |
| 2 | "Kuni Ghayal Karnare" | Anuradha Paudwal | |
| 3 | "Thamb Re Thamb Re Sab Hi Aik Re" | Anuradha Paudwal | |
| 4 | "Kuthali Chahul Kuthale Baadal" | Anuradha Paudwal | |
