= Premsutra =

- Directed by: Tejas Prabha Vijay Deoskar
- Written by: Tejas Vijay Deoskar & Prasad Mirasdar
- Produced by: Kshitij entertainment & Kathakaar
- Starring: Sandeep Kulkarni; Pallavi Subhash; Lokesh Gupte; Shruti Marathe; Shubha Khote; Pradeep Athavale; Prasad Pandit; Meenacshi Martins; Ila Bhate; Shishir Sharma
- Cinematography: Rajesh Bidwe
- Edited by: Apoorva Motivale
- Music by: Susmit Limaye
- Release date: 21 June 2013
- Country: India
- Language: Marathi

Premsutra is a 2013 Marathi romantic film directed by Tejas Prabha Vijay Deoskar. Produced by Kshitij Entertainment in association with Kathakaar, the film features Sandeep Kulkarni, Pallavi Subhash, Lokesh Gupte, Shruti Marathe, Shubha Khote, and Shishir Sharma in lead roles.

== Plot ==
As the name suggests, the film is a romantic film starring Sandeep Kulkarni and Pallavi Subhash. The film is directed by Tejas Deoskar and is a fun ride in the world of romance.

== Cast ==
- Sandeep Kulkarni as Anand
- Pallavi Subhash as Saniya
- Lokesh Gupte as Sujit
- Shruti Marathe as Malavika
- Shubha Khote as Saniya Grandmother
- Shishir Sharma as Malavika Father

== Critical response ==
Premsutra received mostly positive reviews maharashatra times give 3 out of 5 star
