= Guntata Hriday He =

Marathi-language TV series

- Genre: Horror
- Directed by: Satish Rajwade
- Starring: See below
- Country of origin: India
- Original language: Marathi
- No. of episodes: 164

Production
- Camera setup: Multi-camera
- Running time: 22 minutes

Original release
- Network: Zee Marathi
- Release: 27 June 2011 – 13 January 2012

Guntata Hriday He is an Indian Marathi-language television series which aired on Zee Marathi. It starred Mrinal Kulkarni in lead role.

== Plot ==
The storyline revolves around Naina and Vikram, a content couple with a unique family dynamic. Although Naina's parents live with them, Vikram takes charge of his father-in-law's business. Vikram's parents, however, don't share a warm relationship with him, especially his father, who never approves of Vikram. Despite this, Naina manages to secure Vikram's commitment to their marriage, even amidst his father's disapproval.

Mayank, Vikram's friend and business partner, adds another layer of complexity to the narrative. Vikram harbors a bit of resentment towards Mayank, yet Ananya, who works with Vikram, develops a romantic connection with him. Ananya, married to a naval officer, faces the challenges of a long-distance relationship. Eventually, Ananya and Vikram find themselves drawn to each other romantically, leading to a complex and unconventional relationship. In the end, both Vikram and Ananya must navigate the intricacies of their personal lives, including unexpected and mysterious events that bring about significant changes in their perspectives.

As the plot unfolds, unforeseen incidents disrupt the seemingly smooth course of their lives, introducing an element of suspense and mystery. These events not only impact Vikram and Ananya but also have a transformative effect on their emotional landscapes. The narrative takes unexpected turns, pushing both characters to confront challenges and uncertainties. Amidst crises, Vikram and Ananya find themselves facing the repercussions of these mysterious occurrences, leading to a paradigm shift in their emotional worlds. The unfolding events also bring a new character into the picture, someone intimately connected to the twists and turns of Vikram and Ananya's lives. The story explores how they grapple with adversity, evolve as individuals, and build connections amidst the unforeseen mysteries that life unfolds before them.

== Cast ==
=== Main ===
- Mrinal Kulkarni as Nayana Banarase
- Ritika Shrotri as Devi Banarase
- Sandeep Kulkarni as Vikram Banarase

=== Recurring ===
- Vivek Lagoo as Vishwas Sahastrabuddhe, Nayana's father
- Sagar Talashikar as Mayank Dhurandar, Vikram's business partner
- Pallavi Subhash as Ananya
- Mohan Agashe as Ananya's father-in-law
- Madhavi Soman as Bhagyashree, Nayana's friend
- Sneha Majgaonkar as Gauri
- Shivraj Walvekar as Shailesh, Police Inspector and Vikram's friend
- Angad Mhaskar as Abhay, Ananya's husband
- Ajay Purkar as Kapil Bhutkar, Private detective, Fake Vinay Vengurlekar
- Asha Shelar as Lata, Househelp in Nayana's House
- Tushar Dalvi as Avinash, Nayana's friend

== Awards ==
Zee Marathi Utsav Natyancha Awards 2011
Category	Recipient	Role	Ref.
Best Actress	Mrinal Kulkarni	Nayana Banarase	
Best Mother	Mrinal Kulkarni	Nayana Banarase	
Best Character Male	Sagar Talashikar	Mayank Banarase	
Best Child Character	Ritika Shrotri	Devi Banarase	
Best Supporting Male	Vivek Lagoo	Vishwas Banarase	
