= Asa Mee Ashi Tee =

- Theatrical release poster
- Directed by: Atul Kale
- Starring: Sachit Patil; Pallavi Subhash; Manasi Salvi
- Music by: Amitraj
- Release date: 29 November 2013
- Country: India
- Language: Marathi

Asa Mee Ashi Tee is a 2013 Indian Marathi-language film directed by Atul Kale. The film stars Sachit Patil, Pallavi Subhash and Manasi Salvi. It was theatrically released on 29 November 2013.

== Cast ==
- Sachit Patil
- Pallavi Subhash
- Manasi Salvi
- Atul kale
- Bharat Dabholkar
- Shoma Anand
- Anuja Sathe
- Vivek Gore
- Latika Gore
- Atharv Bedekar
- Aadesh Bandekar
- Kishore pradhan
- Viju Khote

== Reception ==
Saumitra Pote from Maharashtra Times opined, "As all the actors in the film are handsome, it is pleasant to watch. Good color scheme, good locations have made the movie spectacular". A critic of Loksatta wrote "After the interval, it goes to a completely different level than before the interval because it unfolds in the wrong way. It seems like the compiler forgot to compile in many places. Although it is an eye-catching love story, it goes viral". A reviewer of Divya Marathi wrote "The director's approach of choosing faces that seem to be of the current modern era has been successful. It is a must watch movie for the audience".
