= Shubha Bol Narya =

1990 Indian Marathi-language film

- Theatrical release poster
- Directed by: Satish Randive
- Written by: Bhaskar Jadhav (Dialogues)
- Screenplay by: Jagdish Khebudkar; Satish Randive
- Story by: Jagdish Khebudkar
- Produced by: Prakash Bondre
- Starring: Laxmikant Berde; Alka Kubal
- Cinematography: Sharad Chavan
- Edited by: N. S. Vaidya
- Music by: K. Sikandar
- Production company: Shree Mahalaxmi Sahakari Chitrasantha
- Release date: 1990
- Running time: 129 minutes
- Country: India
- Language: Marathi

Shubha Bol Narya (transl. Say Good Narya) is a 1990 Indian Marathi-language comedy drama film directed by Satish Randive and produced by Prakash Bondre. The film stars Laxmikant Berde, Alka Kubal, Tejashree. The film was theatrically released in 1990 and is available for streaming on Amazon Prime Video.

== Plot ==
Narya is thrown out of the village on false accusations. He returns in the guise of the pious man Narayan Maharaj with the intention of making revenge on the villagers.

== Cast ==
- Laxmikant Berde as Narya/Narayan Maharaj
- Alka Kubal as Laxmi
- Bhalchandra Kulkarni as Raosaheb Dagde Patil
- Chandrakant Shinde as Mithun
- Shanta Tambe
- Tejashree as Dolly
