= Shilpa Thakre =

Indian dancer, television and film actress

- Born: 22 October 1992 (age 34); Walani, Nagpur, Maharashtra
- Education: Engineering in Electronics and Telecommunication
- Occupation: Actress
- Years active: 2017-present

Shilpa Thakre (born 22 October 1992) is an Indian dancer and actress known for her work in Marathi Cinema. She rose to fame due to her short videos on social media.

== Early life ==
Thakre was born in Walani, Nagpur, Maharashtra.

Thakre completed Engineering in Electronics and Telecommunication in Nagpur. She worked night shift at Tech Mahindra in Pune for 2 years, while doing auditions for film roles in the mornings.

== Career ==
Thakre became known after her short videos, posted to social media, went viral. She is known as expression queen due to her videos on YouTube, TikTok and Likee. As a result, she started receiving offers for film roles and has appeared in a number, including Khichik, Triple Seat, Ibhrat and Bhirkit.

== Filmography ==
=== Films ===
Year	Title	Role	Language	Notes	Ref.
2017	Summi	Summi	Hindi	Short film	
2017	Prema	Sindhu	Marathi		
2019	Perfume	Unknown	Marathi		
2019	Khichik	Dashing Maina	Marathi		
2019	Triple Seat	Kavita	Marathi		
2020	Ibhrat	Maya	Marathi		
TBA	Jangya	Chaani	Marathi		
TBA	Ghat (Nadi Ka Kinara)	Meera	Hindi		
TBA	Bhirkit	Rekha	Marathi		

=== Television ===
Year	Title	Role	Ref.
2018	Dance Maharashtra Dance	Contestant	
2019	Apsara Aali	Contestant	
