= Ajmal Ameer =

Indian actor

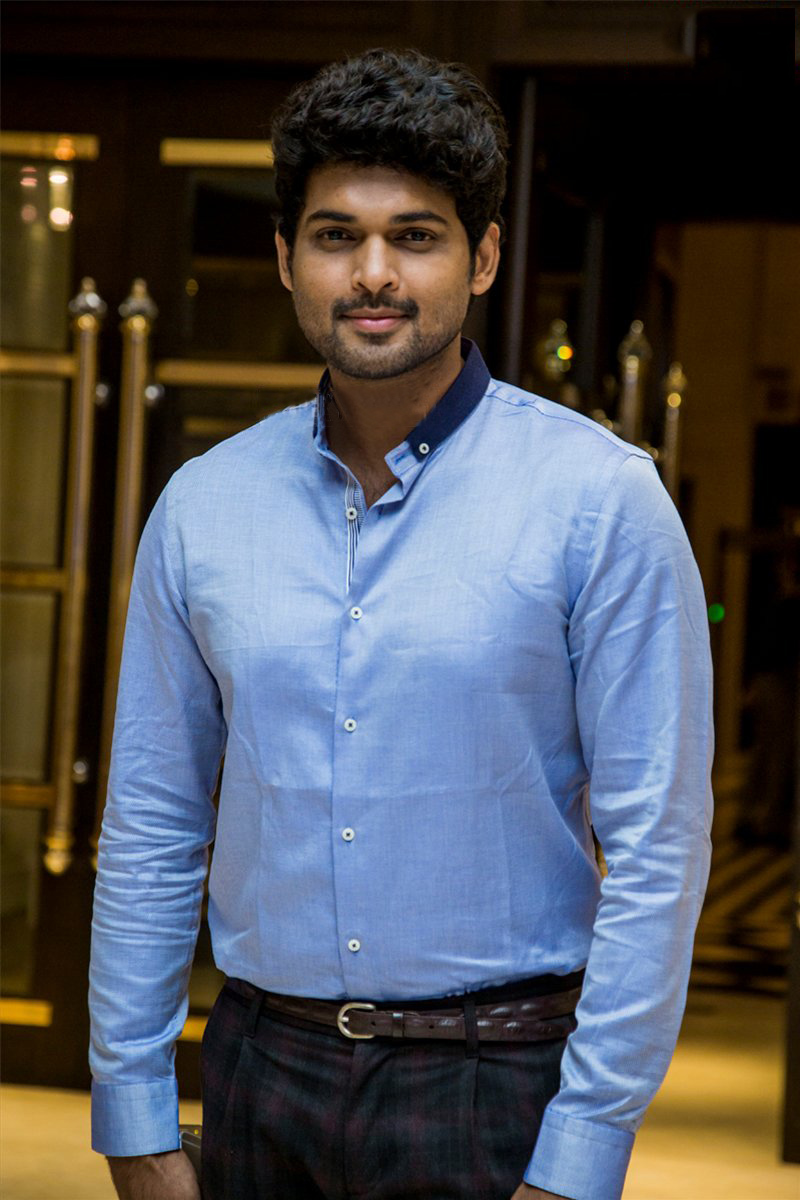
- Ajmal in 2015
- Education: Vinnytsia National Medical University. N. I. Pirogov, Ukraine
- Occupation: Actor
- Years active: 2005–present
- Spouse: Renju Ajmal
- Children: 2

Ajmal Ameer is an Indian actor known for his work in the Malayalam, Tamil and Telugu-language cinema.

== Early and personal life ==
Ajmal studied medicine in Vinnytsia, Ukraine. He has two brothers, Askar and Abith. He is married to Renju and they have a son and a daughter.

== Career ==
Ajmal made his acting debut with a negative role in his friend's Tamil film, February 14 (2005). His lead debut film was the Malayalam film Pranayakalam, opposite Vimala Raman. This was followed by the Tamil film Anjathe, directed by Myshkin, in which he played an angry young man. The film became a commercial success, with Ajmal receiving several awards for his performance. He next starred in the Malayalam film Madambi alongside Mohanlal. It remains his only hit in Malayalam aside from Loham and Two Countries. In 2009, he has gone on to do Tamils films like TN 07 AL 4777 and Thiru Thiru Thuru Thuru. He also acted in an international production in Malayalam De Nova, which went unnoticed. The anti-hero character, Vasanthan Perumal, he portrayed in the 2011 Tamil movie Ko earned him a lot of appreciation. Based on an online poll conducted by The Times of India, Ajmal won the Chennai Times Film Award for Best Actor in a Negative Role Male. In 2012, he made his debut in the Telugu film Rachcha. His willingness to experiment and go beyond the image of the virtuous hero have garnered him a rich spectrum of characters from Tamil and Telugu. In 2013, he played an independent cinematographer in the suspense thriller Bangles. He also did in Karuppampatti (2013) and Vetri Selvan (2014), which for lack of good publicity, bombed at the box office.

He also acted in the Telugu film Prabhanjanam (2014) in which he played the Chief Minister of Andhra Pradesh. In 2015, He hasn't done any major roles in Malayalam and was seen in guest roles in Loham and Two Countries. In 2015, he acted in the Malayalam movie Ben. Since then he had not been active in Malayalam, until 2022 when he played a police officer in the movie Pathaam valavu. He then appeared in the Tamil movie, Iravukku Aayiram Kangal (2018). In 2019, his Tamil films are also Chithiram Pesuthadi 2 and Devi 2. In 2021, he was seen in Nayanthara's film titled Netrikann. He is also part of Malayalam movie Kshanam. In 2022, he has played in Malayalam crime thrillers movies such as Pathaam Valavu and Paappan. Ajmal delivers a flawless performance throughout in the Tamil investigative thriller Theerkadarishi (2023). He was also seen in Telegu thriller movie Mangalavaaram (2023). He was cast alongside the actor Vijay shines in their role in the Tamil action thriller The Greatest of All Time (2024).

== Filmography ==
Key
†	Denotes films that have not yet been released

List of Ajmal Ameer film credits
Year	Title	Role	Language	Notes
2005	February 14	Vicky	Tamil	Debut film
2007	Pranayakalam	Renjith	Malayalam	Lead debut film
2008	Anjathe	Kirubakaran (Kiruba)	Tamil	Won, Filmfare Award for Best Supporting Actor – Tamil
2008	D-17	Ajmal	Malayalam	
2008	Madambi	Ramakrishnan Pillai	Malayalam	
2009	TN 07 AL 4777	Gautham Iyengar	Tamil	
2009	Thiru Thiru Thuru Thuru	Arjun	Tamil	
2010	De Nova	Khaild	Malayalam	
2011	Ko	Vasanthan Perumal	Tamil	Won, Filmfare Award for Best Supporting Actor – Tamil
2011	Lucky Jokers	Vishal	Malayalam	
2012	Racha	James	Telugu	
2012	Arike	Sanjay Shenoy	Malayalam	
2013	Karuppampatti	Kothai Cocopardo / Manohar	Tamil	
2013	Bangles	Vivek	Malayalam	
2014	Prabhanjanam	Chaitanya	Telugu	
2014	Vetri Selvan	Vetri Selvan	Tamil	
2015	Loham	Azhagan Perumaal	Malayalam	
2015	Two Countries	Ullas Kumaran	Malayalam	
2015	Ben	Priest	Malayalam	Guest appearance
2016	Vennello Hai Hai	Susheel	Telugu	
2018	Iravukku Aayiram Kangal	Ganesh	Tamil	
2019	Chithiram Pesuthadi 2	Vicky	Tamil	
2019	Devi 2	Rudhra	Tamil	Bilingual film
2019	Abhinetri 2	Rudhra	Telugu	Bilingual film
2019	Amma Rajyam Lo Kadapa Biddalu	CM V. S. Jagannath Reddy	Telugu	
2020	Nungambakkam	Inspector Shankar	Tamil	
2021	Netrikann	Dr. James Dinah	Tamil	
2021	Kshanam	Arun	Malayalam	
2022	Pathaam Valavu	Varadhan	Malayalam	
2022	Paappan	Solomon / Simon	Malayalam	Dual role
2022	Second Show	Shiva	Tamil	Sri Lankan film
2022	Gold	Sunesh Shaji	Malayalam	
2023	Theerkadarishi	D.C Adithya	Tamil	
2023	Abhyuham	Jayaraj	Malayalam	
2023	Mangalavaaram	Madan	Telugu	
2024	Vyuham	V. S. Jagannath Reddy	Telugu	
2024	Shapatham	V. S. Jagannath Reddy	Telugu	
2024	Thankamani	Robin Paul	Malayalam	
2024	Buddy	Dr. Arjun	Telugu	
2024	Hunt	ASP Sairam IPS	Malayalam	
2024	The Greatest of All Time	Ajay Govindharaj	Tamil	
2025	Accused	Vendhan	Tamil	
