= Aai Tuza Ashirwad =

- Theatrical release poster
- Directed by: Mayur Vaishnav
- Produced by: Murli Nallapa
- Starring: Alka Kubal; Ashok Saraf; Ramesh Bhatkar
- Music by: Prakash More
- Distributed by: Everest Entertainment Pvt. Ltd.
- Release date: 9 August 2004
- Country: India
- Language: Marathi

Aai Tuza Ashirwad is a Marathi film, which released on 9 August 2004.

== Cast ==
The cast in this movie includes Alka Kubal, Ashok Saraf, Ramesh Bhatkar, Seva More, & Others

== Soundtrack ==
The music has been directed by Prakash More and the songs in the movie are:

=== Track listing ===
No.	Title	Singer(s)	Length
1.	"Aai Tuza Aashirwad"	Sujatha More	4:21
2.	"Nij Re Nandlala"	Bhaghyashree Mule	3:32
3.	"Harinamacha Mahima Sarya Jagbhar"	Prakash More, Itad	2:51
4.	"Chala Chala Darshanala Ashtvinayaka Chala"	Poornima, Prakash Kulkarni, Subhash More	5:49
5.	"Vaaniyat Mislun Preeti Sugandhit"	Mandar Bhate, Gauri Bakre
6.	"Aai Tuza Aashirwad (Version 2)"	Sujata More, Shriti Nalalppa
