= Ramesh Bhatkar =

Indian actor (1949–2019)

- Born: 3 August 1949; Kolhapur, Bombay State, India
- Died: 4 February 2019 (aged 69); Mumbai, Maharashtra, India
- Occupation: Actor
- Years active: 1977–2019
- Spouse: Mridula Bhatkar
- Children: Harshavardhan Bhatkar

Ramesh Bhatkar (3 August 1949 – 4 February 2019) was a Marathi film, stage and TV actor. Of the various roles that Bhatkar portrayed, he was best known for his roles in the TV series Commander and Hello Inspector. He worked for more than 30 years as an actor in the mainstream commercial movie industries of the Marathi and Hindi languages. He died on 4 February 2019 at the age of 69 in Mumbai due to cancer.

== Early and personal life ==
Ramesh Bhatkar was born in 1949. His father was Snehal (Vasudeo) Bhatkar, a music director, composer, and singer. In addition to his artistic background, in his early college days Ramesh Bhatkar was a champion swimmer who played for his college's aquatic team, and was an enthusiastic kho-kho player with the reputed Vijay Club in Dadar and used to participate in Marathi drama society in the evening time as an actor .

Ramesh Bhatkar was the youngest of Snehal's three children, with his older siblings being Snehalata Bhatkar (now married to Ramkrishna Barde) and Avinash Bhatkar.

== Career ==
=== Movies ===
Bhatkar's mainstream movie debut was the film Chandoba Chandoba Bhaglaas ka (1977) followed by Ashtavinayak (1978), Duniya kari Salam, Maaherchi Manasa, Aapli Maanasa, and Maherchi Sadi (1991). He also played a groom in the film Lek Chalali Sasarla and also small roles in movies like Savat Mazi Ladki

Of his nearly 90 films, most are in Marathi, with a few in the Hindi language. He was last seen in a character loosely based on former CM of Maharashtra Prithviraj Chavan in the film The Accidental Prime Minister.

=== Television ===
His television career included very popular detective serials such as Hello Inspector (1990) and Damini (Marathi) on DoorDarshan, Commander (1992) on Zee TV, Khoj (2000) on DD National and Teesra Dola (1998) on DD2; all these made Ramesh a very popular TV personality. He also appeared in Haddapaar, Bandini, Vikram Aur Betaal, Yugandhara. He also appeared in his early days in a small telefilm by B. P. Singh, Sirf Chaar din, a suspense/thriller.

His career includes about 30 series with more than 1,000 episodes aired.

=== Theatre ===
Marathi Theatre was Ramesh Bhatkar's first love, with very prominent lead roles in numerous plays. He played a lead role in Ashroonchi Zhali Phule (1975) which ran in the Marathi theatre industry for about 28 years. This role of "Lalya" in this play played by him was earlier made popular by Kashinath Ghanekar. But he also played it with equal potential and made it popular. Dr Ghanekar also appreciated it lastly.

Bhatkar was noticed in the Marathi play Mukta, where he was cast with lead actor Avinash Masurekar and actress Savita Malpekar in 1986.

For the last 30 years, Ramesh has played lead roles in such plays as Ooghadale Swargache Daar (1982), Denaryaache Haath Hazaar (1980), Shadyantra (1991), Kevha Tari Pahate, Akher Tu Yeshilach, Rahu Ketu, Mukta, The Boss- Sutradhar, Kinara.

He has appeared in about 50 different plays overall.

== Death ==
After a one-year battle with cancer, Ramesh Bhatkar died of cardiac arrest on 4 February 2019 at the age of 69.

== Filmography ==
1. Ashtavinayak
2. Aai pahije
3. Saheb (2012)
4. Tamasha – Hach Khel Udya Punha (2011)
5. Sai Darshan
6. Aai Raja Udo Udo (2010)
7. Maalik Ek (2010)
8. Umang (2010)
9. Asa Mi Kay Gunha Kela (2010)
10. Zale Mokale Aakash (2010)
11. Mata Ekvira Navsala Pavli (2009)
12. Gondya Maratay Tangada (2008)
13. Maazi Aai (2008)
14. Sakkha Bhau Pakka Vairi (2008)
15. Bharat Aala Parat (2007)
16. Aai Mala Maaf Kar (2006)
17. Mohityanchi Renuka (2006)
18. Munnabhai S S C (2005)
19. Kay Dyache Bola (2005)
20. Khabardaar (2005)
21. Savarkhed: Ek Gaav (2004)
22. Saatchya Aat Gharat (2004)
23. Aai Tuza Ashirwad (2004)
24. Gharandaaj (2003)
25. Shodh (2003)
26. Maratha Battalion (2002)
27. Jaidev (2001)
28. Censor (2001)
29. Ashi Gyaneshwari (2001)
30. Badmaash (1998)
31. Hafta Vasuli (1998)
32. Sarkarnama (1997)
33. Sehme Huay Sitaren (1995)
34. Bedardi (1993)
35. Bomb Blast (1993 film)
36. Ghayaal (1993)
37. Paisa Paisa Paisa (1993)
38. Savat Majhi Ladki (1993)
39. Maherchi Sadi (1991)
40. Bandhan (1991)
41. Bombay War (1990)
42. Lapwa Chhapwi (1990)
43. De Taali (1989)
44. Gharkul Punha Hasave (1989)
45. Hamaal De Dhamaal (1989)
46. Aai Pahije (1988)
47. Rangat Sangat (1988)
48. Prem Karuya Khullam Khulla (1987)
49. Mi Chairman Boltoy (1986)
50. Vahinichi Maya (1985)
51. Sobati (1984)
52. Duniya Kari Salaam (1979)

Player acted

- Ughadale Swargache Daar (1982)
- Denaryaache Haath Hazaar (1980)
- Shadyantra (1991)
- Kevha Tari Pahate
- Akher Tu Yeshilach
- Rahu Ketu
- Mukta
- The Boss- Sutradhar
- Kinara
- Ashroonchi Zaali Phule
- Premachya Gava Jave

Serials / Shows acted

- Hello Inspector (1990)
- Damini
- Commander (1992) – Hindi
- Teesra Dola
- Haddapaar
- Bandini
- Yugandhar
- Vikram Aur Betaal
- Suspense Every Week
- 100 Days (2016)

A (more complete) partial list is available on IMDB.
