= Ashalata Baidya =

Bangladeshi freedom fighter

- আশালতা বৈদ্য
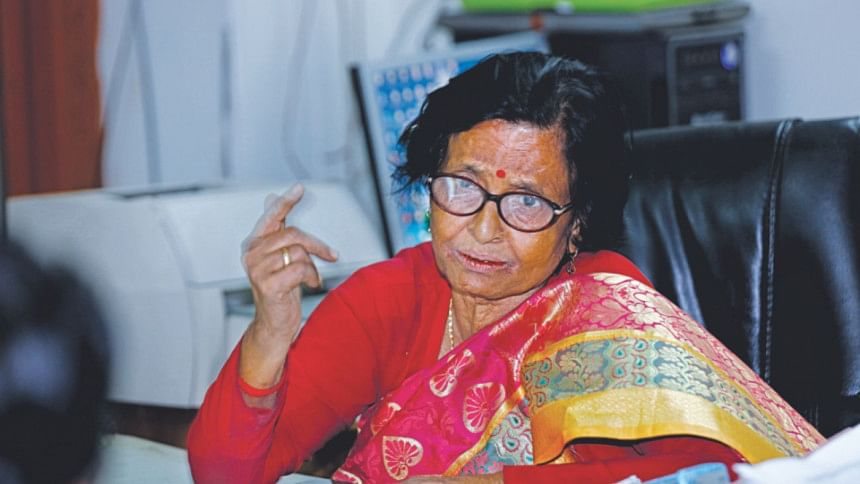
- Born: February 12, 1956 (age 70); Kotalipara, Gopalganj, Bangladesh
- Education: Dhaka University
- Known for: Commander of an all-women guerrilla group during Liberation War of Bangladesh
- Awards: Bangamata Begum Fazilatunnesa Mujib Award - 2022

Ashalata Baidya (born 12 February 1956) was a freedom fighter and the only female commander of an all-women guerrilla group during the Bangladesh Liberation War. She received the Bangamata Begum Fazilatun Nesa Mujib Award in 2022 for her contributions to independence and the Liberation War.

== Early life ==
Ashalata was born on 12 February 1956 in Latenga village of Sadullapur Union, Kotalipara Upazila, Gopalganj district. Her father was Haripada Baidya, and her mother was Sarlamoyee Baidya. She earned her BA (Honors) and MA degrees from the Department of Bangla at Dhaka University. She served as the founding president of the Rokeya Hall Chhatra League.

== Career ==
Ashalata Baidya joined the forces of Commander Hemayet Uddin in the Kotali Para border sub-sector of sectors 8 and 9 during the Liberation War at the young age of 15. She participated in the war as the head of the women's command of Hemayet Bahini. She was the sole commander of this freedom fighter group, which consisted of 45 armed female freedom fighters and nearly 345 women soldiers. In recognition of her contributions to independence and the Liberation War, she was awarded the Bangamata Begum Fazilatun Nesa Mujib Award in 2022.
