= List of Odia films of 1991 =

This is a list of films produced by the Ollywood film industry based in Bhubaneshwar and Cuttack in 1991:

== A-Z ==
Title	Director	Cast	Genre	Notes
1991
Aadi Mimansa	A. K. Bir	Mohan Gokhale, Neena Gupta, Lalatendu Ratha		A. K. Bir won the Best Cinematography award, National Film Awards, 1991
Aam Ghara Aam Sansara		Bijay Mohanty		
Bastra Haran	Sisir Misra	Sriram Panda, Mahasweta Roy		
Bhabantaran	Kumar Sahani	Kelucharan Mohapatra		
Doora Diganta	Kumar Misra	Ashrumochan		
Kapala Likhana	Hara Patnaik	Uttam Mohanty, Ajit Das, Aparajita Mohanty		
Ki Heba Sua Posile	Basant Sahu	Siddhanta Mahapatra, Arura		
Kotia Manish Gotiye Jaga	Bijaya Bhaskar	Bijay Mohanty		
To Binu Anya Gati Nahin	Mahmad Mahsin	Uttam Mohanty, Aparajita Mohanty		
