= Ashalata Sen =

Indian revolutionary

- Born: 5 February 1894; Noakhali, British India
- Died: 13 February 1986 (aged 92); New Delhi, India
- Known for: Indian independence revolutionary

Ashalata Sen (5 February 1894 – 13 February 1986) was an Indian activist, poet, social worker, and a leading figure in the Indian independence movement.

== Life ==
Ashalata Sen was born in 1894 to Bagalamohan Dasgupta and Manodasundari Dasgupta in Noakhali to a lawyer family. Her father was a lawyer at the Noakhali Judge's Court. She was drawn to literary works since childhood. At the age of 10, she wrote poems with nationalist fervor against the Bengal partition and was published in the Antahpur magazine. With encouragement from her grandmother, Nabashashi Devi, she entered at the political arena in 1905, at the age of 11, by joining the Swadeshi movement. Uchchhvas, Utsa, Vidyut and Chhotoder Chhada were some of the books penned by Sen.

In 1921, she joined the Non-cooperation movement by Mahatma Gandhi; and established a Shiksha Ashram in her home for women empowerment. In 1922, she joined the Gaya Congress as a delegate from the Dhaka district. She established the Gandaria Mahila Samiti in 1924, in collaboration with Sarma Gupta and Sarjubala Gupta, to further Gandhian philosophy and instill a feeling of nationalism in the women participants. In 1925, she became a member of the All India Katuni Sangh (AIKS) and started promoting the use of Khadi in nearby villages.

She died on 13 February 1986 at her son’s residence in New Delhi.
