= Hello Inspector =

Indian crime television series

- Directed by: Heeran Adhikari
- Starring: Ravi Kishan
- Original language: Hindi
- No. of episodes: 189

Production
- Producers: Gautam Adhikari; Markand Adhikari
- Production company: Sri Adhikari Brothers Television Network Limited (SABTNL)

Original release
- Network: DD Metro
- Release: 7 May 2002 – 25 January 2003

Hello Inspector is an Indian suspense thriller TV serial starring Ravi Kishan that aired on DD Metro from 7 May 2002 to 25 January 2003. The series was produced by Sri Adhikari Brothers Television Network Limited (SABTNL) and was directed by Heeren Adhikari.

Ravi Kishan plays the main role of Inspector Vijay, who solves crimes, usually over two episodes.

== Cast ==
=== Main ===
- Ravi Kishan as Inspector Vijay

=== Episodic appearances ===
- Nagesh Bhonsle as
  - Shekhar Kapoor
  - Rajkishore Swami
- Jyoti Joshi as Deepti Bhatnagar
- Geeta Tyagi as
  - Raina Rahul Jaiswal
  - Sujata Rakesh Malhotra
- Bobby Vats as
  - Rahul Jaiswal
  - Sumeet Nagpal
- Shraddha Sharma as Sheela John D' Silva
- Lalit Parimoo as Dr. Diwakar Aachole
- Bhupendra Singh Bhupi as John D' Silva
- Pankaj Berry as
  - Judge Krishnakant Sahay
  - Shreekant Sahay
- Sulabha Arya as Mrs. Sahay
- Suhas Khandke as Dr. Agnihotri
- Bhairavi Raichura as Kavita Rakesh Ranjan
- Avinash Sahijwani as Rakesh Ranjan
- Vinod Kapoor as Dr. Ajay Verma (Episode 8 to Episode 10)
- Ami Trivedi as Sapna Mehta
- Sumeet Kaul as Suraj Mehra
- Suresh Chatwal as
  - Mr. Bajaj
  - Preetam
- Bakul Bhatt as
  - Jagira
  - Raghu
- Mukesh Jadhav as Jacob
- Manav Sohal as
  - Abhijeet Roy
  - Bhushan
- Ajay Trehan as Advocate Ratra
- Manish Garg as
  - Kailash Agarwal
  - Vilas
- Kishori Shahane as Shalini Gupta
- Nivedita Bhattacharya as Kamini Gupta
- Prithvi Vazir as
  - Aniruddh Kumar
  - Ajeet Rastogi
- Nishikant Dixit as Rakesh Malhotra
- Pratap Sachdev as Mr. Dayal
- Jeet Upendra as
  - Jeet Khurana
  - Saurabh Nagpal
- Prachi Shah as
  - Sushmeeta
  - Malini (After plastic surgery)
- Adarsh Gautam as Deepak
- Jitendra Trehan as Advocate Prashant Agarwal
- Pankaj Dheer as Judge Vikram Singh Chauhan
- Zaheed Ali as Advocate Rajan Verma
- Mona Parekh as Reema Khosla
- Pratichi Mishra as Nirmala Vikram Singh Chauhan
- Nikhil Diwan as Prakash
- Somesh Agarwal as
  - Advocate Bihari
  - Mr. Pathak
- Gufi Paintal as J. P. Raheja
- Mithilesh Chaturvedi as K. D. Kriplani
- Rajni Chandra as Mrs. Batra
- Rajesh Puri as
  - Dhanraj Karodimal
  - Mr. Lal
- Rajendra Chawla as Mr. Mehta
- Sachin Khurana as Prem
- Brij Gopal as Shakeel Makrani
- Sanjeev Seth as Sanjay Mathur
- Jaya Mathur as Jyoti Sanjay Mathur
- Firdaus Mevawala as Advocate Batliwala
- Atul Kale as Kidnapper
- Raj Tilak as Mr. Nagpal
- Yajuvendra Singh as Karan
- Pubali Sanyal as Aarati Saurabh Nagpal
- Parul Yadav as Sheela Ramani
- Mac Mohan as Keshav Kapse
- Mahesh Raj as Michael
- Akhil Ghai as Naresh Suri
- Reena Kapoor as Avantika Rohit Kumar / Avantika Naresh Suri
- Sheetal Maulik as Neha Alok Dikshit
- Dinesh Kaushik as Alok Dikshit
- Sulakshana Khatri as Shivani Lal

== Episode list ==
Episode No.	Episode Name	Telecast Date
1	Kaun: Part 1	7 May 2002
2	Kaun: Part 2	8 May 2002
3	Poorvaabhaas: Part 1	9 May 2002
4	Poorvaabhaas: Part 2	10 May 2002
5	Poorvaabhaas: Part 3	11 May 2002
6	Vaishiyat: Part 1	14 May 2002
7	Vaishiyat: Part 2	15 May 2002
8	Fareb: Part 1	16 May 2002
9	Fareb: Part 2	17 May 2002
10	Fareb: Part 3	18 May 2002
147	Shikar: Part 1	28 November 2002
148	Shikar: Part 2	29 November 2002
149	Shikar: Part 3	30 November 2002
150	Zeher: Part 1	3 December 2002
151	Zeher: Part 2	4 December 2002
