= Walani =

- Census town
- Location in Maharashtra, India
- Coordinates: 21.3306°N 79.095°E
- Country: India
- State: Maharashtra
- District: Nagpur

Population (2001)
  - Total: 10,716

Languages
  - Official: Marathi
- Time zone: UTC+5:30 (IST)

Walani is a census town in Nagpur district in the Indian state of Maharashtra.

== Demographics ==
As of 2001 India census, Walani had a population of 10,716. Males constitute 53% of the population and females 47%. Walani has an average literacy rate of 75%, higher than the national average of 59.5%: male literacy is 80%, and female literacy is 69%. In Walani, 13% of the population is under 6 years of age.

Year	Male	Female	Total Population	Change	Religion (%)							
Year	Male	Female	Total Population	Change	Hindu	Muslim	Christian	Sikhs	Buddhist	Jain	Other religions and persuasions	Religion not stated
2001	5644	5072	10716	-	71.258	19.214	0.261	0.317	8.809	0.009	0.000	0.131
2011	4939	4454	9393	-12.346	70.723	22.208	0.266	0.245	6.484	0.032	0.000	0.043
