= Sandeep Sawant =

Indian filmographer

Sandeep Sawant is an Indian theatre, film and television personality. He is the director and script writer of the national award-winning Marathi movie Shwaas. Sawant was one of the producers of Shwaas, his debut film. Author Sandeep Unnithan credits him to have resurrected Marathi cinema.

Sawant has made documentaries for television, some of which have been related to children. Times of India reporter Mukta Rajadhyaksha comments that he has a flair for working with children that was manifest in his handling of Ashwin Chitle the boy who won the national award for best child artist for his portrayal of Parshya in Shwaas.

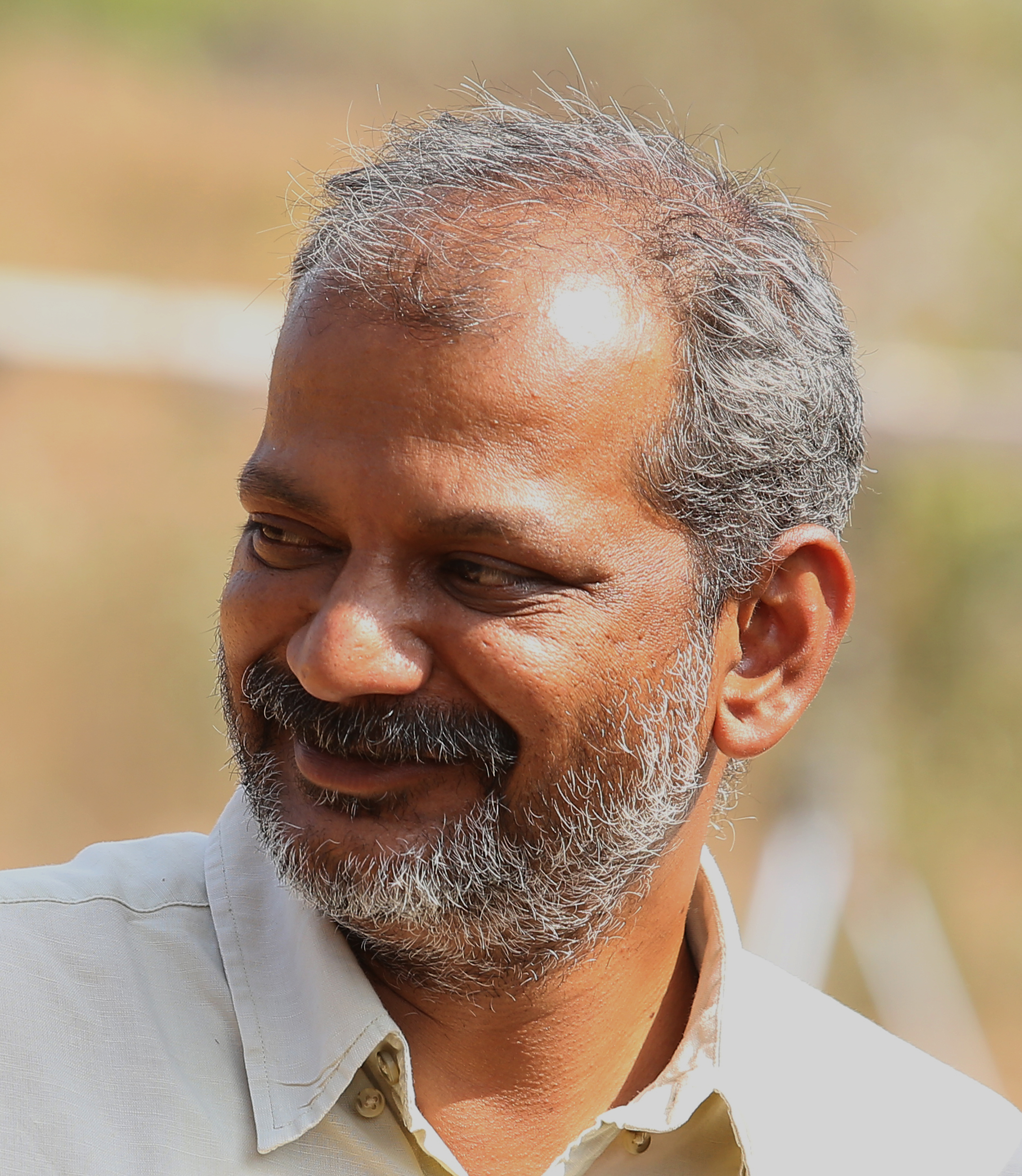
Sandeep Sawant is writer, director and producer of films 'Shwaas' and 'Nadi Vahate'

Sawant resides in Vile Parle, Mumbai. He is a psychology graduate and is married to Neeraja Patwardhan, who has designed costumes for Shwaas.

Concept, screenplay, dialogues and direction of the 2017 Marathi movie Nadi Vahate are by Sandeep Sawant. He and his wife Neeraja Patwardhan produced the film.

== Filmography ==
- Shwaas (2004)
- Nadi Vahate (2017)
- Hya Goshtila Navach Nahi (2024)
