= Arun Nalawade =

Indian actor and film producer

- Born: 26 August 1955 (age 71); Bombay, Maharashtra, India
- Citizenship: Indian
- Occupation: Actor
- Years active: 1983–present
- Spouse: Anjali
- Children: 1

Arun Nalawade is an Indian film and theater personality. He has worked in BEST Undertaking. He is co-producer of Shwaas: the film that won the Golden Lotus India's National Film Award for Best Feature Film for the year 2003, he also acted in the film. He is recipient of two Maharashtra State Film Awards. He was honoured with V. Shantaram Special Contribution Award by the Government of Maharashtra.

Arun Nalawade was born and raised in Girgaon Chawl, Mumbai. he started working in plays since the age of 20. He did characters of aged roles than his real age roles. The actor has worked in all the three mediums – films, TV and theaters, Arun Nalawade Directed Film Tatwa.

== Early life ==
Nalawade was born and grew up on 26 August 1955. He spent his childhood in the Reserve Bank of India colony in Matunga, where he developed an interest in films and theatre. He would watch English films with his uncle and later narrate the stories to his friends. While still at school, he wrote a one-act play titled Shunyacha Parabhav.

Nalawade has also written about the influence of his father on his early life. His father was a Rashtriya Swayamsevak Sangh (RSS) volunteer and encouraged him to attend its local branch. He recalled that his father also took him to films and plays, helped him prepare speeches and encouraged him to participate in sports. He credited his father's discipline and encouragement with contributing to his development as an actor. His involvement with theatre began during his youth. While working for the BEST Undertaking in the mid-1970s, he repeatedly participated in its selection process for the Maharashtra state drama competitions. He was initially rejected because of his short stature. He eventually received a small role in Dusra Peshwa, in which, at the age of 22, he played a 70-year-old Brahmin. The performance earned him a silver medal for acting at the state-level competition and helped establish his career in theatre.

== Personal life ==
Nalawade is married to Anjali. The couple have a daughter, Tanaya. Tanaya was born while he was performing in the play Agnipankh. He also described the support he received from Anjali, who had experience working in a bank and later left her job when their daughter was in the eleventh standard to devote more time to her.

== TV serials ==
- Man Udu Udu Jhala as Manohar Deshpande
- Avaghachi Sansar as Dhanaji Mane
- Majhya Navaryachi Bayko as Ramchandra Damle (Nanaji)
- Ka Re Durava as Ketkar Kaka
- Aabhalmaya
- Vadalvaat
- Jigarbaaz as Meshram Sir
- Bheti Lagi Jeeva
- Vasudha
- Kimayagaar
- Ran Manus
- Nati Goti
- Police File
- Gahire Pani
- Reshimgathi
- Rath Chanderi
- Saripat Ha Sansaracha
- Ek Ha Asa Dhaga Sukhacha
- Tan Tana Tan
- Bhumika
- Kalokh
- Aapali Manase
- Baba
- Bin Bhintinche Ghar
- Shubham Karoti
- Kalay Tasmai Namah
- Swapnanchya Palikadle
- Yeah Duniya hai Rangeen
- Lifeline
- Baabul Ki Duae Leti ja
- Smile Please
- Aanandi
- Devkhel

== Plays ==
- Tera Divas Premache
- Shunyacha Parabhav
- Abda Shabda
- Temple Employment
- Kalpravah
- Manu Ani Masa
- Vyasancha Kayakalpa
- Ghost
- I Confess
- Kaalsutra
- Suras Ani Chamatkarik
- Moruche Pollution
- Hunger Strike
- Mhay
- Mahabhartache Uttarramayan
- Queue
- Ravnayan
- Rope Trick
- The Escape
- Ushir Hotoy
- Shraddha
- Ratra Aarambha
- Surkutya
