= Ashwin Chitale =

Indian actor

Ashwin Chitale‌
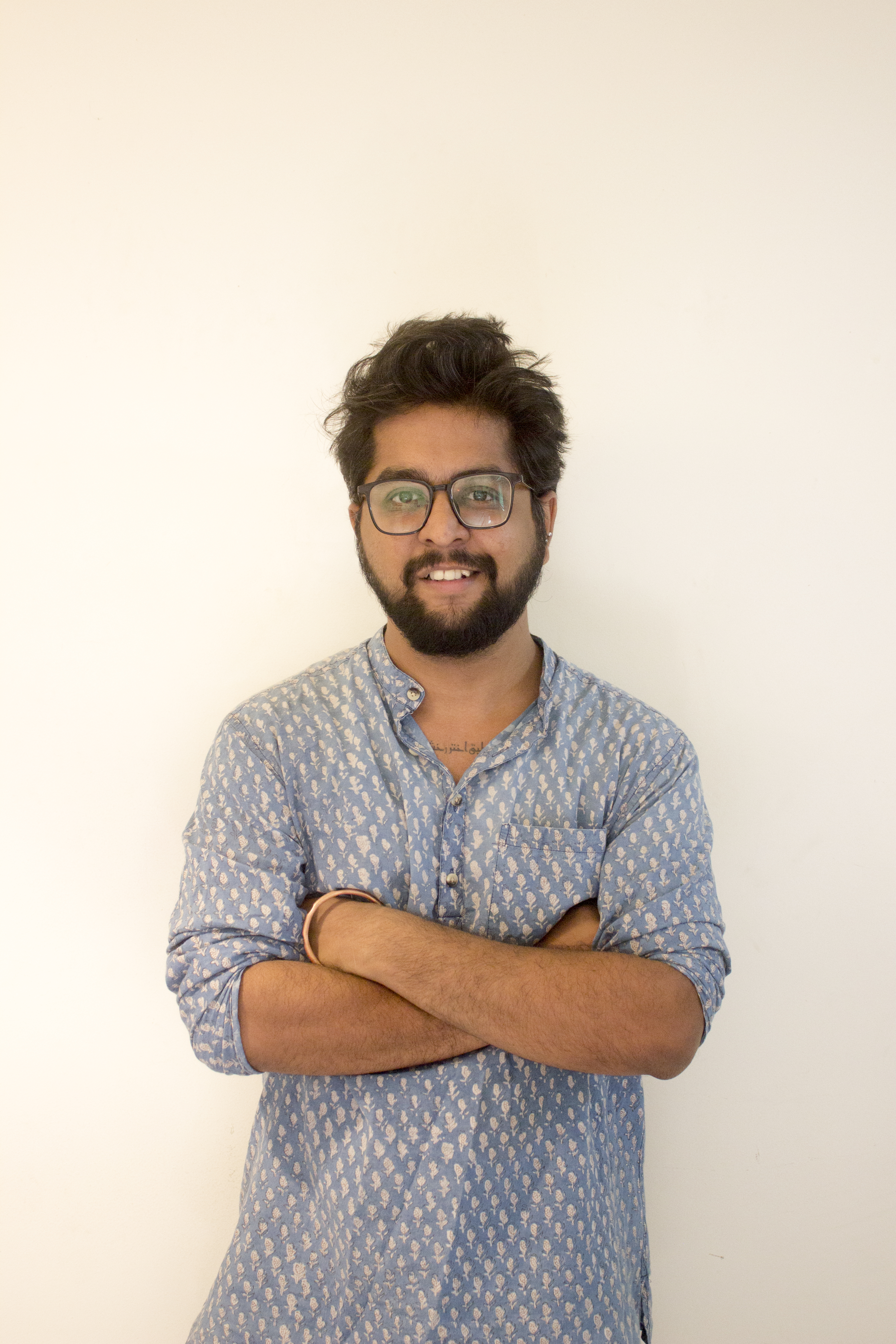
- Chitale in 2024
- Born: 18 April 1996 (age 30); Pune, Maharashtra, India
- Occupations: Actor, Poet
- Years active: 2004–present
- Notable work: Shwaas (2004) Taxi No. 9211 (2006) Aashayein (2010)
- Awards: National Film Award for Best Child Artist

Ashwin Chitale also known as Ashwin Afraad is an Indian poet, writer, storyteller and actor. He won the national award for best child actor for his performance in the film Shwaas (2004) a Marathi language film. He has played the role of Govinda in the Nagesh Kukunoor directed Hindi movie Aashayein. The other Hindi films in which he acted are Zor Lagaa Ke...Haiya! (2009) and Ahista Ahista (2006). He also played the role of Rishabh Shastri, son of Raghav Shastri (Nana Patekar) in Taxi No. 9211 (2006).

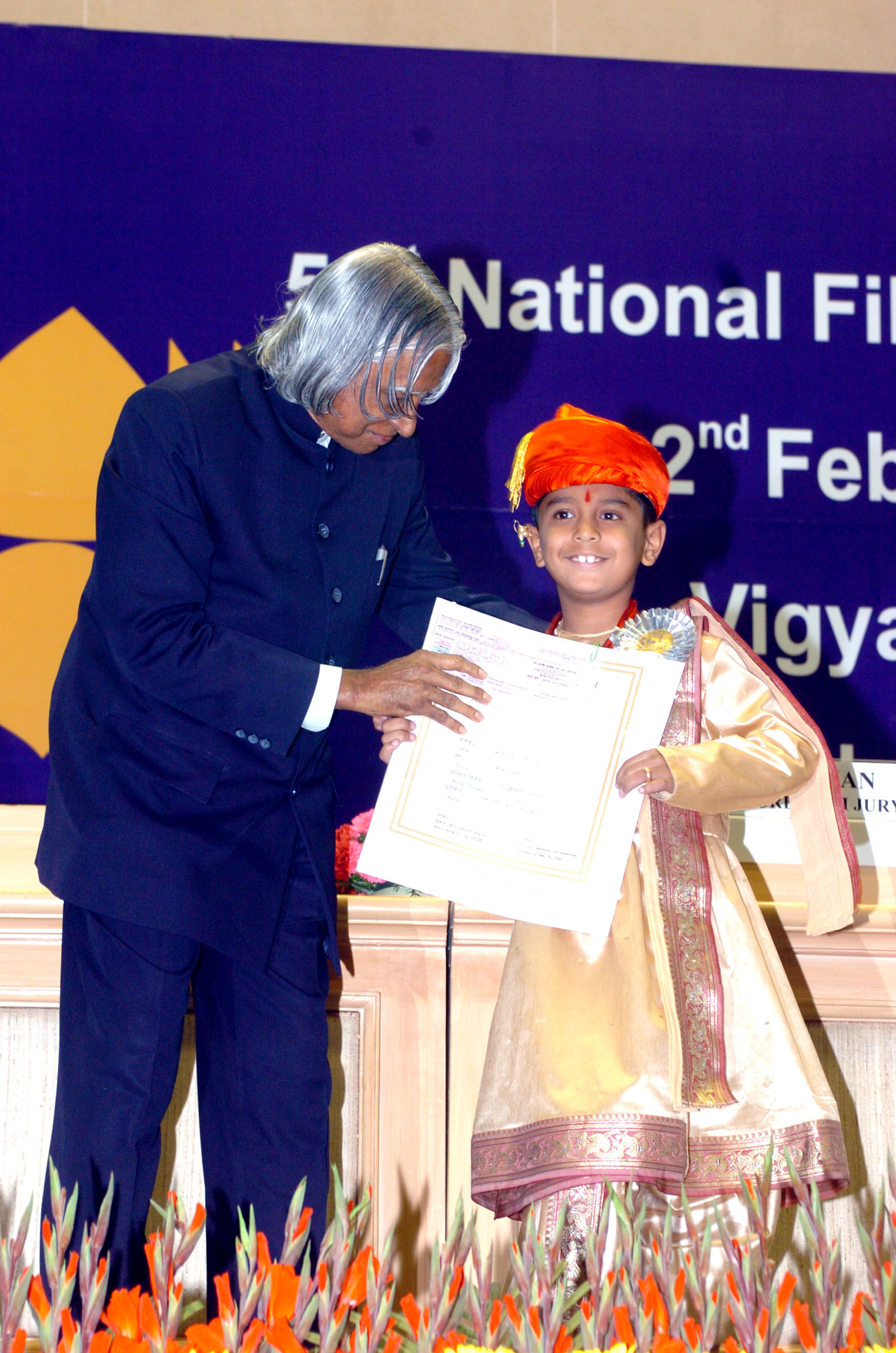
President Dr. A.P.J. Abdul Kalam presenting the Best Child Artists Award to Ashwin Chitale in 2005

Chitale belongs to Pune, completed his schooling at Nutan Marathi Vidyalaya. and has completed his Master's in Indology and Philosophy

Ashwin has founded Aashwin Heritage, a company dedicated to history, heritage, art, and cultural awareness in India. He has conducted heritage walks and trips across the country, blending storytelling and narratives to bring history to life. Based in Pune, the company frequently organizes heritage walks in and around the city, especially following the pandemic.

Ashwin has developed a deep interest in the Persian language and created a show called Rumi Hai, which portrays the life and works of Rumi. Performing under his stage and pen name, Afraad, Ashwin Chitale brings this production to life.

In 2024, Ashwin developed an interest in the Sindhi language and created a show titled Shah Jo Risalo, based on the seven Sindhi love stories written by Sufi poet Shah Abdul Latif Bhittai.

Ashwin also teaches Persian and Urdu, conducts heritage trips, and organizes storytelling workshops for children. He has delivered several online and offline lectures on Rumi, Sufism, Omar Khayyam, and the Persian literary tradition.
