= Sandeep Kulkarni =

Indian actor (Born November 1964)

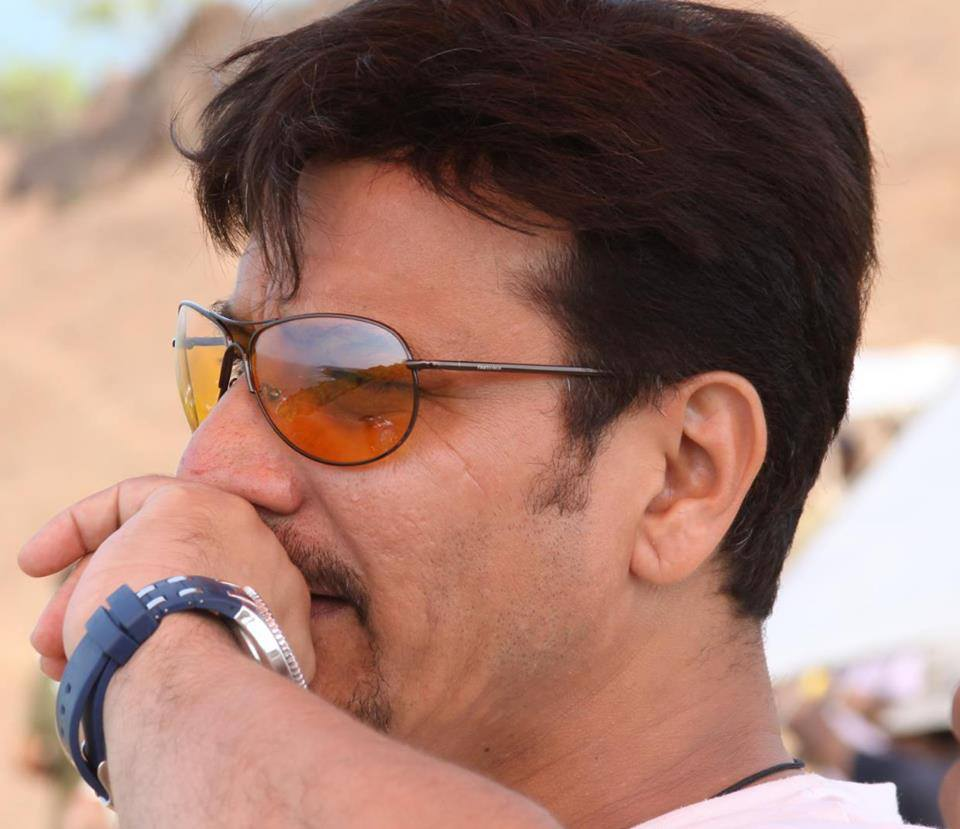
- Born: 16 November 1964 (age 61); Pune, Maharashtra, India
- Occupation: Actor
- Years active: 1994–present
- Spouse: Kanchan Naik (m. 1999)
- Father: Shrikant Kulkarni

Sandeep Kulkarni is an Indian actor who works in Hindi and Marathi films.

== Early life and background ==
Kulkarni was born in Pune, Maharashtra to Shrikant and Lata Kulkarni on 16 November 1964. He was raised in a middle-class Marathi family. He attended the J. J. School of Arts in Mumbai.

== Career ==
After working in theatre for four years in English, Marathi and Hindi productions, he started to work in television. He played varied roles including a young Muslim lawyer in the TV Serial 9 Malabar Hill, which aired on Zee TV, a press reporter in Farz, which aired on DD Metro, an underworld don in the Doordarshan channel Swabhimaan and a counselor in Nyay. He also played the role of a cop who solves the mystery behind an old couple refusing to accept the dead body of their son in the one-hour suspense thriller First Kill directed by Sriram Raghavan. He also played a small role in CID.

His first film role was in the 1994 film Mammo, directed by Shyam Benegal, set against the backdrop of the India-Pakistan partition (1947). He played the role of an immigration officer who tries to help the protagonist Mammo. In 1999, he acted in the film Shool.

He played the role of a gangster, Shankar in the 1996 film Is Raat Ki Subah Nahin, directed by Sudhir Mishra. In 1998, he played a naxalite turned activist in the film Hazaar Chaurasi Ki Maa, directed by Govind Nihalani. In 2004, he acted in the critically acclaimed Shwaas, which earned him recognition. He played the role of an oncologist who convinces the grandfather of a child suffering from eye cancer to agree to a life-saving surgery although he is faced with the possibility that the child may become permanently blind. The film earned numerous awards such as the National Award for Best Film, as well as being India's official entry to the Oscars. Actress Shabana Azmi praised the actor's performance.

In 2005, he acted in the film Hazaaron Khwaishein Aisi, directed by Sudhir Mishra, where he played a Naxalite leader, involved in spreading the Naxalite Movement from Bangladesh to India. The same year he acted in the critically acclaimed Dombivli Fast, directed by Nishikant Kamat, which won the National Award for Best Film. He also played the role of Pandurang Sadashiv Sane, an Indian freedom fighter in his biopic.

In 2006, he acted in the film Traffic Signal, directed by Madhur Bhandarkar, where he played the role of a NGO volunteer helping street children. In 2009, he acted in the Marathi film Made In China where he played the role of a farmer. That same year he won the Best Actor Award at the Nigerian International Film Awards for his role in the film Ek Daav Sansaracha. In the film he played the role of a husband whose failing marriage causes problems in his personal life.

In 2010, he acted in the thriller The Waiting Room. In 2013, he acted in the film D-Day,

== Filmography ==
Year	Film	Role	Language	Notes	References
1994	Mammo	Inspector Apte	Hindi		
1996	Is Raat ki Subah Nahin	Shankar	Hindi		
1998	Hazaar Chowrasi ki Maa	Ritu	Hindi		
1999	Shool	Gopalji	Hindi		
2002	Hathyar	MLA Kishan Rao Morey	Hindi		
2002	Aadharstambh	Iqbal	Marathi		
2004	Shwaas	Dr. Sane	Marathi		
2005	Dombivli Fast	Madhav Apte	Marathi		
2005	Hazaaron Khwaishein Aisi	Probir (Naxalite)	Hindi		
2005	Adhantari		Marathi		
2006	Sane Guruji	Sane Guruji	Marathi		
2007	Traffic Signal	Khadi (social worker)	Hindi		
2007	Rajkaran		Marathi		
2008	Maay Baap	Vishvanath	Marathi		
2008	Bedhund	Army Major	Marathi		
2008	Ek Daav Sansaracha	Ajit Sawant	Marathi		
2009	Ladies Special	Shivam Shinde	Marathi	Television Show	
2009	Made in China	Mohit Jagdale	Marathi		
2009	Gaiir	Sameer Shroff	Marathi		
2010	The Waiting Room	Ghanshyam	Hindi		
2010	Pratisaad - The Response	Dr. Aditya Deshmukh	Marathi		
2010	Ankganit Anandache	Anand	Marathi		
2010	Khel Saat-Baaracha	Khobragade	Marathi		
2011	Nirvana 13	Naseer	Hindi		
2011	Fakira		Hindi		
2011	Paranoia				
2013	D-Day	Atul Mishra	Hindi		
2013	Duniyadari	M.K.(Shreyas)	Marathi		
2013	Ajinkya	Anant Dharmadhikari	Marathi		
2013	Premsutra	Anand Joshi	Marathi		
2018	Dhaad	Pranjivan	Gujarati	Delayed Release	
2019	Krutant		Marathi		
2023	Tiger 3	Pakistan PM's secretary	Hindi		
2024	Satyashodhak	Mahatma Jyotirao Phule	Marathi		
2025	Asambhav	Dr. Satyajeet	Marathi		
2026	Khashaba	TBA	Marathi		

=== Television ===
- Mayanagari-City of Dreams (Hotstar)
- Avantika
- Guntata Hriday He
- CID (1999)
- 9 Malabar Hill (1997)
- Swabhimaan (Doordarshan)
- Farz (DD Metro)
- Nyaay (DD Metro)
- Khidki (2016)
- Daldal (2026)

== Awards and honours ==
=== International awards ===
- 2004 - Official entry for the Oscars: Shwaas
- 2008 - Nigerian International Film Festival Awards - Best Actor, Ek Daav Sansaracha

=== National awards ===
- 2004 - Shwaas
- 2005 - Dombivli Fast
- 2007 - Traffic Signal

=== State awards ===
- 2004 - Best Actor, Shwaas
- 2005 - Best Actor, Dombivli Fast
- 2005 - Best Actor, Adhantari

=== Other awards ===
- 2004 - Maharashtra State Awards – Best Actor, Shwaas
- 2005 - Maharashtra State Awards – Best Actor, Dombivli Fast
