= Alka Kubal =

Indian actress (born 1968)

- Born: 23 September 1965 (age 60); Bombay, Maharashtra, India
- Occupation: Actress
- Years active: 1980–present
- Spouse: Sameer Athalye (m. 1992)
- Children: 2

Alka Kubal-Athalye (born 23 September 1965) is a Marathi film actress from Mumbai, India. in a carrier spanning 40 years She has worked over 100 Marathi and some Hindi movies. Her film Maherchi Sadi made her a household name in Maharashtra. She has often played strong and complicated female characters—from fictional to literary—in both mainstream and independent films. Kubal won twice Maharashtra State Film Award for Best Actress and nominated three times for Filmfare Marathi Awards.

Kubal established herself as the most popular Marathi actress of the 1980s and 1990s. She is best known for her performances in films such as Streedhan (1984), Lek Chalali Sasarla (1984), Tujhyawachun Karmena (1986), Shubha Bol Narya (1990), Maherchi Sadi (1991), Soona Yeti Ghara (1995), Kamaal Majhya Baikochi (1997), Navsach Por (1998), and Devki (2001).

== Early life ==
Kubal was born on 23 September 1965 in Mumbai. Her father, Ladu Krishna Kubal, served as a superintendent in the technical department of Tata Mills, while her mother, Sumati Kubal, was a teacher in a municipal school. She completed her schooling at Maharashtra Vidyalaya in Goregaon and later attended Dalmia College in Mumbai, where she earned a Bachelor of Arts (B.A.) degree in Psychology.

Although she did not come from a family with a background in the arts, Kubal was drawn to the creative field from an early age. She began her career as a child artist on the Marathi stage, performing in approximately 400 shows of various plays during her school years. Her most notable theatrical works from this period include Natsamrat, Sandhyachhaya, and Veda Vrindavan.

== Personal life ==
She is married to the cinematographer Sameer Athalye, and along with acting she produced some Marathi films like Aamhi Ka Tisre (2012), Agnipariksha (2010) and Suwasinichi Hee Satwapariksha (2010). She has played the role of the mother in the biopic Dr Tatyarao Lahane... Angaar Power is Within.

== Career ==
=== Early career and cinematic debut (1981–1984) ===
Alka Kubal began her professional acting journey on the Marathi stage, appearing in plays such as Aapla Manus and Vatvat Savitri. She made her silver screen debut in 1981 with the film Chakra. Her first major commercial success came with the 1984 film Lek Chalali Sasarla, which performed exceptionally well across Maharashtra and established her as a leading actress in the industry.

=== Stardom and "Queen of Family Dramas" (1980s–1990s) ===
Throughout the late 1980s and 1990s, Kubal became synonymous with family-centric and female-oriented cinema. She specialized in portraying various domestic roles, including the resilient daughter, obedient daughter-in-law, and devoted mother. Her career reached a historic peak with the 1991 blockbuster Maherchi Sadi, which became one of the highest-grossing films in Marathi cinema history. She received critical acclaim and awards for her performances in Streedhan and Tujhyavachun Karmena. To challenge her image as a sentimental heroine, she ventured into comedy with the film Shrimant Damodar Pant.

=== Film Production and Television (2000s–Present) ===
After three decades in front of the camera, Kubal expanded into film production. Her production credits include Suwasinichi Sattvapariksha, Nate Mama-Bhachiche, Agnipariksha, and the socially relevant film Aamhi Ka Tisre, which addressed the challenges faced by the transgender community.

She has also been a prominent figure on Marathi television, starring in popular series such as Yugandhara, Amrutvel, Bandini, Ye Re Ye Re Paisa, Akashzhep, Mangalsutra, and Aai Majhi Kalubai. Over a career spanning more than 30 years, she has appeared in over 250 Marathi films.

== Filmography ==
=== Films ===
Year	Title	Role	Notes
1979	Sobati	Unnamed	
1981	Chakra	Amli	
1984	Streedhan	Ratna	Lead debut Maharashtra State Film Award for Best Actress
1984	Lek Chalali Sasarla	Mukta Inamdar	
1985	Vahinichi Maya	Madhavi	
1986	Tujhya Vachun Karamena	Anuradha Suryavanshi	Maharashtra State Film Award for Best Actress
1987	Porichi Dhamaal Bapachi Kamaal	Neela	
1988	Nashibwan	Alka	
1989	De Taali	Alka Daji Raoji Rede	
1989	Rajane Wajvila Baja	Karuna	
1989	Auntie Ne Vajavili Ghanti	Sharmila Pansare	
1989	Rickshaw Wali	Sujata	
1989	Madhu Chandrachi Ratra	Naina	
1989	Dharla Tar Chavtay	Nayan Patil	
1989	Zakali Muth Sawa Lakhachi	Vidya	
1989	Gharkul Punha Hasave	Laxmi	
1989	Balache Baap Brahmachari	Kamal Patil	
1990	Shubha Bol Narya	Laxmi	
1990	Dhumakool	Alka	
1990	Lapwa Chhapwi	Sita Gokhale	
1991	Yeda Ki Khula	Mohini	
1991	Bandalbaaz	Manju	
1991	Aandhala Sakshidar	Nilofar D'Souza	
1991	Kal Ratri 12 Wajta	Lakshmi	
1991	Fatfajiti	Maina	
1991	Doctor Doctor	Suman	
1991	Jasa Baap Tashya Pori	Pooja Thorat-Sahukar	
1991	Maherchi Sadi	Laxmi	
1991	Naya Zaher	Alka	Hindi film
1992	Anuradha	Anuradha / Madhavi	
1992	Amrutvel	Nanda	
1992	Khulyancha Bazar	Radha	
1993	Tainchya Bangdya	Suman	
1993	Chaar Diwas Sasuche	Shalu	
1993	Ram Rahim	Alka	
1993	Mahercha Aaher	Uma Jadhav	
1994	Gharandaaz		
1995	Zakhmi Kunku	Durga	
1995	Taich Lagna	Alka	
1995	Senani Sane Guruji	Yashodabai	
1995	Sunbaichi Punyaai	Shila	
1995	Soona Yeti Ghara	Savitri	Nominated Filmfare Award for Best Actress – Marathi
1995	Oti Hi Khana Narlachi	Laxmi	
1996	Durga Aali Ghara	Janki Deshmukh	
1996	Maya Mamta	Shante	
1997	Sasuchi Maya	Gayatri Naik	
1997	Baba		
1997	Kamaal Majhya Baikochi	Laxmi Niphadkar	
1997	Bahini Bahini		
1997	Tyaag		
1998	Navsach Por	Shanta	Nominated Filmfare Award for Best Actress – Marathi
1999	Nirmala Macchindra Kamble	Nirmala	
1999	Sasar Majhe He Bhagyacha		
1999	Maherchi Pahuni	Shubhangi	
1999	Tuch Majhi Suhasini	Suhasini	
1999	Pratidaav		
1999	Dhangad Dhinga	Mrs. Nadkarni	
2000	Tochi Ek Samrat		
2001	Shirdi Sai Baba	Tulsi	
2001	Devki	Vasudha Paranjpe	
2001	Tulas Aali Ghara	Varsha Inamadar	
2001	Zak Marli Mumbai Pahili		
2002	Owalini	Devki Kumbhar	
2002	Maratha Bataliyan	Savitri Bhosle	
2003	Nishkalank	Mansi Desai	
2003	Bhaubeej	Mrs khan	
2004	Aai Tuza Ashirwad	Urmila	
2004	Oti Krishnamaichi	Krushna	
2004	Majh Ghar Tujha Sansar	Sarita	
2004	Suhasinichi Hi Satvapariksha	Suman	
2006	Naatigoti	Kusum V. Rao	
2006	Gruhlakshmi	Laxmi	
2010	Agnipariksha	Alka	
2012	He Vaat Jeevanachi	Laxmi	
2012	Amhi Ka Tisre	Anu's wife	
2013	Sur Rahu De	Deepika	
2013	Shrimant Damodar Pant	Shanta (Mai)	
2013	Majhi Shala	Savitri	
2013	Sant Sevalal	Unnamed	
2014	Marg Maza Aekala	Laxmi	
2015	Olakh - My Identity	Sanjay's mother	
2015	Te Don Diwas	Alka	
2015	Anjaan Parindey	Unnamed	
2016	Well Done Bhalya	Rahul's mother's	
2016	Chiranjeev	Ganya Kaka's wife	
2018	Ghar Hota Menacha	Laxmi	
2018	Dr. Tatya Lahane - Angaar Power is Within	Anjanabai	
2019	Wedding Cha Shinema	Prakash's mother	
2020	Dhurala	Jyoti Tai Ubhe	
2022	Sher Shivraj	Tulja Bhavani	
2023	Aalay Majhya Rashila	Aai	
2023	Subhedar	Jana Garadhin	
2025	Mangla	Suhasini Deshpande	

=== Television ===
Year	Title	Role	Notes
2008	Anand Baba		Chichondi, Ahmednagar dd Sahyadri
2008	Ashta Roopa Jai Vaibhavlaxmi Mata	Sheela	
2020-2021	Aai Majhi Kalubai	Kalubai	Lead role

== Awards ==
- Maharashtra State Film Award for Best Actress For Debut Film Streedhan.
- Maharashtra State Film Award for Best Actress For Tujhyawachun Karmena.
- Nominated Filmfare Award for Best Actress – Marathi for film Soona Yeti Ghara.
- Nominated Filmfare Award for Best Actress – Marathi For Film Navsach Por.
- Nominated Filmfare Award for Best Supporting Actress – Marathi for film Dhurala.

She has received several awards including the V. Shantaram Award in 2016, Rajya Sanskrutik Puraskar in 2013 and many others.
