= Shwaas =

2004 film by Sandeep Sawant

- Promotional release poster
- Directed by: Sandeep Sawant
- Screenplay by: Sandeep Sawant
- Story by: Madhavi Gharpure
- Produced by: Arun Nalawade; Sandeep Sawant; Devidas Bapat; Rajan Cheulkar; Mohan Parab; Nareshchandra Jain; V. R. Nayak; Deepak Choudhary
- Starring: Arun Nalawade; Ashwin Chitale; Sandeep Kulkarni; Amruta Subhash
- Cinematography: Sanjay K. Memane
- Edited by: Neeraj Voralia
- Music by: Bhaskar Chandavarkar
- Distributed by: Kathi Arts
- Release date: 2004
- Running time: 107 minutes
- Country: India
- Language: Marathi
- Budget: ₹0.60 crore (US$64,000)
- Box office: est.₹2.75 crore (US$290,000)

Shwaas ('The Breath') is a Marathi film, released in 2004. It was India's official entry to the 2004 Oscars and was ranked 6th in the Academy Award for Best Foreign Language Film category. Its storyline is based on a real-life incident in Pune. With a low-budget of the Indian rupee of 65 lakhs (6.5 million), Shwaas won the National Award for best film in 2004, nearly 50 years since a Marathi film (Shyamchi Aai) last earned this title. Directed by debutant Sandeep Sawant, it was shot in 33 days at Sindhudurg, Konkan, Pune and at KEM Hospital in Pune. Shwaas was acknowledged as a "significant turn for Marathi cinema" which had been going through a low patch. After its success, it was released in Hindi, Bengali and Tamil languages.

Vishwanath Nayak, one of the eight producers, a chartered accountant for Arun Nalawade, a Marathi stage actor, suggested him to make a film. Later, Arun came across a story by writer Madhavi Gharpure, published in the Diwali edition of a magazine and thought that it would make a wonderful film storyline. The distribution plan for Shwaas was in place before production began. In the initial stages, it was taken to as many villages as the team could manage; marriage halls, school auditoriums and makeshift venues were all used for screening. All this despite the fact that Shwaas has no songs, heroes, heroines or recognizable stars of the Marathi film industry.

== Cast ==
- Ashwin Chitale (Parashuram Vichare, the child suffering from retinal cancer)
- Arun Nalawade (grandfather of Parashuram who takes him to Mumbai)
- Sandeep Kulkarni (Dr. Milind Sane who operates on Parashuram)
- Amruta Subhash (medical social worker named Asawari who helps grandfather, child and doctor to understand each other)
- Ganesh Manjrekar (Divakar: Parashuram's uncle who accompanies child and grandfather to Pune)
- Ashwini Giri (Parashuram's mother who stays in the village).
- Vibhavari Deshpande as receptionist

== Plot ==
A villager (Vichare) brings his 8-year-old grandson Parshuraam (also known as Parshya) to a doctor in Pune to diagnose the child's eyes. They are accompanied by Parshya's maternal uncle Diwakar. On the first day Vichare is asked to sign the usual papers before admission in hospital. Upon asking, he learns that the papers say the doctor would not be responsible if anything goes wrong. Vichare, the rustic grandfather finds these terms unacceptable. A medical social worker, Aasawari, quickly comes in and explains the practice to Vichare. She calms him down and accompanies them during the first appointment with the doctor. Dr. Sane quickly diagnoses child with retinoblastoma — a rare retinal cancer. After consulting with other colleagues in the US and the UK, the doctor finds that the only way to save the child's life is to perform an operation that will leave the child blind. As per rules, the doctor explains this and insists the child be informed of this before the surgery. He cannot be operated on without this knowledge as it would be unethical. Aasawari (Amruta Subhash) who helps the doctor in convincing the grandfather and the grandson, tries to keep track of Vichare and persuades him not to fall prey to other doctors promising false cures. She tries to befriend Parshya to explain to him what is going to happen. However, she finds it is too difficult to explain to him that he will turn blind.

The film then depicts the grandfather's struggle to accept the reality that the only way to save his grandson is at the cost of his eyesight. He tries to come to terms with the situation and his personal agony is shown in scenes, like asking for second opinions, explaining his grandson the reality, and his desire to show him everything possible before his grandson loses his eyesight. For some reason, the surgery has to be postponed by a day. That afternoon, the grandfather and the grandson disappear from the hospital ward and a frantic search follows. Confronted by an angry surgeon on their return, the grandfather states quite simply that he wanted to show Parshya the sights of the city for one last time.

Shwaas has been applauded for scenes which depict the difficulty faced by doctors to explain to grandfather and Parshya that nothing can be done and the truth is inevitable. It shows the medical fraternity in a very positive light, with the doctors and nurses being extremely supportive and doing the best they can, and helping the villagers with the best facilities. The last shot where Parshya returns home wearing dark glasses, waving to his family and friends from the boat was widely appreciated by film critics.

== Reviews ==
This Indian melodrama about a young boy with retinal cancer whose only chance for survival is an operation that will leave him blind is unstintingly sentimental and a bit tedious, but it also has a winning simplicity and some touching moments. The story is a kind that American audiences are accustomed to finding on basic cable television, and there is something strange and oddly gratifyng [sic] about seeing it rendered with the luster and grandeur of CinemaScope.

— A. O. Scott, The New York Times

The film received 40% positive ratings at Rotten Tomatoes.

== Awards ==
The film received numerous awards at national and state levels. Shwaas won the Maharashtra State Film Award and then India's highest National Film Award, bringing the coveted Golden Lotus to Marathi cinema for the first time since 1954. Ashwin Chitale won the best child artist award.

- 2003: National Film Award for Best Feature Film
- 2003: National Film Award for Best Child Artist - Ashwin Chitale

== Bid for Oscar award ==
Shwas was India's official entry to the Academy Award for Best Foreign Language Film in 77th Academy Awards (the Oscar awards), 2004. The team faced financial problems to showcase and promote their film at the Oscars. People from all classes came forward with contributions. A school in Jogeshwari organized its children to make lamps and sell them and made a contribution of Rs. 30,000. Another group of students cleaned cars to collect some money. A division of standard 10 students in Nasik collected Rs. 10 each and their teacher added some more to donate Rs. 1001. A Marathi theatre group that performs the Marathi play Yada Kadachit collected around Rs. 65,000.

They approached multinationals and corporate biggies to get sponsorships. Cricketer Sachin Tendulkar held an auction to help raise funds. Bollywood actor Amitabh Bachchan donated INR 1 lakh (100,000) for the Shwaas' Oscar bid. Mumbai's Siddhivinayak temple installed a drop box for people to donate for Shwaas promotion at Oscars. The government of Goa contributed INR 21 lakh (2.1 million). Ministry of Youth Affairs and Sports (India) committed Rs 50,000 and the Government of Maharashtra had given Rs 15 lakh (1.5 million) towards the fund. Even political parties like Shiv Sena helped in the promotion.

The Shwaas' team was director Sandeep Sawant, marketing manager Anil Bastawade, costume designer and Sawant's wife Neeraja Patwardhan; they tried to attract Maharashtrian people in the USA before the Oscars. They addressed a crowd of 12,000 members of the Maharashtra Vishwa Parishad in New Jersey while attending the Diwali celebrations in Manhattan. Shwaas was screened 14 times in the USA during the pre-Oscar bid. The team took a three-hour drive to Atlantic City to meet Maharashtra Mandals for their support. However, the movie failed at the Oscar and was ranked 6th.
