= Zapatlela (film series) =

Indian film series

- Created by: Mahesh Kothare
- Original work: Zapatlela (1993)
- Owner: Kothare and Kothare Vision
- Years: 1993–present

Films and television
- Film(s): Zapatlela (1993); Zapatlela 2 (2013); Zapatlela Mi Tatya Vinchu (TBA)

Audio
- Soundtrack(s): Zapatlela; Zapatlela 2

Miscellaneous
- Box office: ₹15 crore (2 films)

Zapatlela is an Indian Marathi-language horror comedy film series created by Mahesh Kothare. The first film, Zapatlela, was released in 1993, followed by the second installment, Zapatlela 2, in 2013. The third installment of the series is in development.

== Films ==
Film	Released	Director	Cast	Producer
Zapatlela	16 April 1993	Mahesh Kothare	Mahesh Kothare, Laxmikant Berde, Pooja Pawar, Madhu Kambikar, Kishori Ambiye, Ravindra Berde, Jairam Kulkarni, Vijay Chavan, Raghavendra Kadkol, Bipin Varti, Dilip Prabhavalkar	Mahesh Kothare
Zapatlela 2	7 June 2013	Mahesh Kothare	Adinath Kothare, Sonalee Kulkarni, Mahesh Kothare, Makarand Anaspure, Sai Tamhankar, Madhu Kambikar, Vijay Chavan, Deepak Shirke, Dilip Prabhavalkar, Abhijeet Chavan, Vishakha Subhedar, Raghvendra Kadkol	Mahesh Kothare, Adinath Kothare

=== Zapatlela ===
The first installment in the series, directed and produced by Mahesh Kothare under Jenma Films International. It is inspired from the 1988 American film Child's Play, directed by Don Mancini. The film stars Mahesh Kothare, Laxmikant Berde, Pooja Pawar, Kishori Ambiye, Madhu Kambikar, Jairam Kulkarni, Vijay Chavan, Ravindra Berde, Raghavendra Kadkol, and Bipin Varti, with Dilip Prabhavalkar making a cameo appearance and providing the voiceover for the puppet character Tatya Vinchu. The practical effects for the puppet were created by Ramdas Padhye. The film's music was composed by Anil Mohile, while cinematography was handled by Suryakant Lavande. Zapatlela became a notable success in Marathi cinema, blending elements of horror and comedy.

The film was also dubbed in Hindi as Khilona Bana Khalnayak.

=== Zapatlela 2 ===
Zapatlela 2, the second installment in the series, was released 20 years later in 2013 in 3D format. Around ₹1.7 crore was invested in 3D and visual effects. Directed and co-produced by Mahesh Kothare, the film features an ensemble cast including Adinath Kothare, Sonalee Kulkarni, Mahesh Kothare, Makarand Anaspure, Sai Tamhankar, Madhu Kambikar, Vijay Chavan, and Deepak Shirke. Dilip Prabhavalkar returned to reprise the voice role of Tatya Vinchu. The music was composed by Avadhoot Gupte, while cinematography was handled by Suresh Deshmane. Despite the high production values, the film underperformed at the box office, grossing ₹12 crore in its entire theatrical run.

== Cast and characters ==
Actor/Actress	Film		
Actor/Actress	Zapatlela (1993)	Zapatlela 2 (2013)	Zapatlela Mi Tatya Vinchu (TBA)
Mahesh Kothare	Mahesh Jadhav	Mahesh Jadhav	Mahesh Jadhav
Laxmikant Berde	Laxmikant Bolke		Laxmikant Bolke
Adinath Kothare		Aditya Bolke	Aditya Bolke
Dilip Prabhavalkar (voice actor)	Tatya Vinchu	Tatya Vinchu	Tatya Vinchu
Bipin Varti	Kubdya Khavis		
Raghvendra Kadkol	Baba Chamatkar	Baba Chamatkar	
Pooja Pawar	Aavdi		
Madhu Kambikar	Parubai Bolke	Parubai Bolke	TBA
Abhijeet Chavan		Kubdya Khavis	
Makarand Anaspure		Makarand Vatvate	TBA
Kishori Ambiye	Gauri Ghatge		
Jairam Kulkarni	Jairam Ghatge		
Vijay Chavan	Constable Sakharam		
Sonalee Kulkarni		Megha Satarkar	TBA
Sai Tamhankar		Gauri Wagh	
Ramdas Padhye	Himself (Cameo)		

=== Mahesh Jadhav ===
Mahesh Jadhav is a CID Inspector in the films, serving as the primary law enforcement officer chasing down the notorious crime lord Tatya Vinchu, portrayed by Mahesh Kothare. He first appears as a CID inspector in Zapatlela and is promoted to commissioner in the sequel, Zapatlela 2. He is dedicated, skilled, and deeply involved in the investigation surrounding Tatya Vinchu's criminal activities, especially after the death of the crime lord. He is also shown as a determined, no-nonsense character who doesn't believe in the supernatural but is forced to confront it due to Tatya Vinchu's reincarnation in a puppet. Throughout the story, Mahesh works alongside others, including Gauri, to uncover the truth and bring justice. His persistence and bravery ultimately lead to the defeat of Tatya Vinchu, though the film leaves room for his role to continue in the investigation of the villain's severed head.

=== Laxmikant Bolke ===
Laxmikant Bolke, also known as Lakshya, is a puppeteer and ventriloquist from the village of Shrirangpur, Maharashtra, who also works as a shopkeeper. The character, portrayed by Laxmikant Berde, is introduced in the film Zapatlela. He is in a relationship with Aavdi, the daughter of Constable Tukaram, but their relationship faces obstacles due to Aavdi's forced marriage arrangement with another constable, Sakharam. Lakshya becomes unwittingly entangled in the supernatural events when his sister, Gauri, sends him a puppet from the US, which is later revealed to be possessed by the soul of the notorious crime lord, Tatya Vinchu. Lakshya is initially unaware of the puppet's dark nature and believes it to be a harmless ventriloquist's prop, but soon finds himself at the center of a deadly struggle as Tatya Vinchu attempts to possess his body.

=== Tatya Vinchu ===
Tatya Vinchu is the main antagonist in the films, a notorious crime lord who is deeply feared for his ruthlessness and criminal intelligence. He is initially introduced as a villain involved in various illegal activities, including theft and murder. His character is marked by a desire for power and immortality, which leads him to seek out a magical "Mrityunjay Mantra" from a magician named Baba Chamatkar. This mantra has the power to transfer the soul of the person chanting it into any living or non-living object.

Tatya Vinchu's quest for immortality drives the central conflict of the story. After being fatally shot during a police encounter with CID Inspector Mahesh Jadhav, he uses the mantra to transfer his soul into a ventriloquist puppet, which allows him to continue his life as a puppet-controlled entity. His goal becomes to possess the body of Lakshya, the son of his previous adversary, in order to regain a human form and continue his reign of terror.

=== Kubdya Khavis ===
Kubdya Khavis is a key antagonist in the film played by Bipin Varti in Zapatlela (1993) and by Abhijeet Chavan in Zapatlela 2 (2013). He is the former sidekick Tatya Vinchu. After Tatya Vinchu is fatally shot and believed to be dead, Kubdya Khavis escapes from prison and is determined to resurrect his master. He seeks out Baba Chamatkar, the magician who initially gave Tatya Vinchu the "Mrityunjay Mantra," which allows the soul to transfer into any living or non-living object.

Kubdya Khavis attempts to revive Tatya Vinchu in exchange for a share of diamonds that were stolen by him and Tatya. However, Baba Chamatkar refuses to help him, and in a fit of rage, Kubdya Khavis tries to kill the magician. In an accidental turn of events, Kubdya Khavis' blood lands on the puppet that Tatya Vinchu had possessed, leading to the resurrection of Tatya's soul. Kubdya Khavis, despite his role in the resurrection, ends up being killed by Baba Chamatkar, setting the stage for the ongoing conflict between Tatya Vinchu and the protagonists.

Kubdya Khavis serves as a loyal but misguided character who is instrumental in bringing Tatya Vinchu back, but ultimately meets his demise in the process.

=== Aavdi ===
Aavdi is the daughter of Constable Tukaram in the film. It was played by Pooja Pawar. She is in a romantic relationship with Lakshya, the protagonist, who is a shopkeeper and Puppeteer in Shrirangpur. However, her marriage has been arranged with Constable Sakharam against her wishes. Throughout the story, Aavdi supports Lakshya, and by the end of the film, she is set to marry him after the conflict with Tatya Vinchu is resolved.

=== Baba Chamatkar ===
Baba Chamatkar is a wizard in Mumbai who possesses knowledge of powerful spells, including the "Mrityunjay Mantra" which allows the character's soul to inhabit other objects. Initially fearful of the notorious crime lord Tatya Vinchu, he reluctantly provides the mantra, setting off the events of the story. After Tatya Vinchu's revival, Baba Chamatkar reveals that to transfer his soul into a human body, Tatya Vinchu must use the mantra on the person to whom he first confessed his identity. Chamatkar ultimately resists assisting Tatya Vinchu further, leading to his confrontation with Kubdya Khavis, where he kills Khavis in self-defense before being threatened by Vinchu again.

The character was played by Raghvendra Kadkol.

=== Parubai Bolke ===
Parubai Bolke is a key supporting character portrayed by Madhu Kambikar in the both films. She is the mother of Lakshya and the grandmother of Aditya Bolke. Parubai lives in the village of Shrirangpur, where she plays a central role in the family dynamics. As a widow, she is portrayed as a caring and protective matriarch who looks after her family, especially her son and later her grandson.

In the story, Parubai is closely involved with the events surrounding the puppet possessed by the soul of the Tatya Vinchu. She is unaware of the puppet's sinister nature at first but becomes a key figure in trying to protect her family from Tatya's influence. When Tatya Vinchu seeks to possess the body of her son Lakshya, and later her grandson Aditya, Parubai becomes a crucial part of the story, trying to safeguard them from the malevolent spirit.

=== Aditya Bolke ===
Aditya Bolke is the main protagonist in Zapatlela 2. It was played by Adinath Kothare. He is the son of Lakshya and Aavdi, a key characters from the previous installment. Aditya is a mechanical engineer who is currently unemployed and lives with his grandmother, Parubai, in Shrirangpur. Despite being trained in engineering, he shares his father's passion for ventriloquism. Aditya is introduced as a young man who gets involved with the events surrounding the revival of the character, Tatya Vinchu, when he inadvertently becomes the target for Tatya Vinchu's soul migration.

Aditya is the key to Tatya Vinchu's plan, as Tatya seeks to transfer his soul into Aditya's body, given that Aditya is the son of Lakshya (who had a connection to Tatya Vinchu's past). Throughout the story, Aditya navigates his life, his budding romance with Megha, and his encounters with various characters, including Makarand (the ventriloquist), while also facing the growing threat from Tatya Vinchu, who is seeking to use Aditya's body to resurrect himself fully.

== Additional crew and production details ==
Occupation	Film		
Occupation	Zapatlela (1993)	Zapatlela 2 (2013)	Zapatlela Mi Tatya Vinchu (TBA)
Director	Mahesh Kothare	Mahesh Kothare	Mahesh Kothare
Producer(s)	Mahesh Kothare	Mahesh Kothare, Adinath Kothare	Mahesh Kothare, Rajnish Khanuja
Story	Mahesh Kothare	Mahesh Kothare	Mahesh Kothare
Screenplay	Mahesh Kothare; Ashok Patole	Mahesh Kothare; Ashok Patole	Mahesh Kothare; Ashok Patole
Dialogues	Ashok Patole	Ashok Patole	Ashok Patole
Music composer(s)	Anil Mohile	Avadhoot Gupte	TBA
Lyricists	Pravin Davne	Guru Thakur	TBA
Cinematography	Suryakant Lavande	Suresh Deshmane	TBA
Editors	Vishwas–Anil	Shashank Shah	TBA
Production Designers	Nivrutti Dalwi	Nitin Desai	TBA
Choreographers	Subal Sarkar	Umesh Jadhav; Phulawa Khamkar	TBA
Action Directors	Aziz–Anadalib; Mansur Bhai	Andalib Pathan	TBA
Production companies	Jenma Films International	Kothare and Kothare Vision; Viacom 18 Motion Pictures	Select Media Holdings; Jenma Films International
Distributors	Adinath Film Distributors	Moving Pictures	TBA

== Release and revenue ==
Film	Release date	Budget	Box office revenue
Zapatlela	16 April 1993	Not known	₹3 crore
Zapatlela 2	7 June 2013	₹4.5 crore	₹12 crore
Total			₹15 crore

== Upcoming films ==
=== Zapatlela Mi Tatya Vinchu (TBA) ===
In 2017, Mahesh Kothare announced his plans to create Zapatlela 3. Then, in 2024, he confirmed the project again under the title Zapatlela Mi Tatya Vinchu, revealing that it is scheduled for a theatrical release in 2025.

== Remakes ==
- Ammo Bomma, a Telugu remake of Zapatlela (1993), starring Rajendra Prasad, Suman, Seema, Uma.
