= Zapatlela 2 =

- Theatrical release poster
- Directed by: Mahesh Kothare
- Written by: Mahesh Kothare
- Screenplay by: Ashok Patole; Mahesh Kothare
- Story by: Mahesh Kothare
- Produced by: Mahesh Kothare; Adinath Kothare; Viacom 18 Motion Pictures
- Starring: Adinath Kothare; Sonalee Kulkarni; Mahesh Kothare; Makarand Anaspure; Sai Tamhankar; Madhu Kambikar; Vijay Chavan; Deepak Shirke; Dilip Prabhavalkar
- Cinematography: Suresh Deshmane
- Edited by: Shashank Shah
- Music by: Avdhoot Gupte
- Production companies: Kothare and Kothare Vision; Viacom 18 Motion Pictures
- Distributed by: Viacom 18 Motion Pictures; Moving Pictures
- Release date: 7 June 2013 (Maharashtra)
- Running time: 119 minutes
- Country: India
- Language: Marathi
- Budget: ₹4.5 crore
- Box office: ₹12 crore

Zapatlela 2 (transl. Possessed 2) is a 2013 Indian Marathi-language horror comedy thriller film written and directed by Mahesh Kothare. Produced by Kothare and Kothare Vision, it was distributed by Viacom18 Motion Pictures. A sequel to the 1993 film Zapatlela, it stars Adinath Kothare, Sonalee Kulkarni, Mahesh Kothare, Makarand Anaspure, Sai Tamhankar, Madhu Kambikar, Vijay Chavan, Deepak Shirke, and features Dilip Prabhavalkar providing the voice for Tatya Vinchu. This film is notable for being the first Marathi movie shot entirely with a 3D camera. Mahesh Kothare has also announced plans for a third installment, set for theatrical release in 2025.

== Plot ==
Kubdya Khavis (Abhijeet Chavan), the former sidekick of Tatya Vinchu, is shown to have escaped from the prison and retrieved the puppet which contained the soul of Tatya Vinchu. He takes the puppet of the mansion of the wizard, Baba Chamatkar (Raghavendra Kadkol), and orders him to revive Tatya Vinchu again. Kubdya Khavis admits that the diamonds worth ₹5 crore which are now worth ₹50 crore were stolen by him and Tatya Vinchu but only Tatya Vinchu knew their location. Kubdya Khavis plans to find out the location of the diamonds and kill Tatya Vinchu again and also offers Baba Chamatkar half of the cost of the diamonds in return for reviving Tatya. However, Baba Chamatkar refuses to commit the same mistake again, causing an infuriated Kubdya Khavis to attempt to kill him with a trishul (a weapon which looks like a trident), but Baba Chamatkar uses the same weapon to kill Kubdya Khavis instead. A drop of Kubdya Khavis' blood is accidentally transferred towards the puppet which resuscitates Tatya Vinchu. Tatya Vinchu confronts Baba Chamatkar and forces him to tell how to migrate his soul into a human body. Baba Chamatkar resists in thee victim (Tatya Vinchu) must make use of the Mrutyunjaya Mantra on the person to whom he has confessed his identity, but now that the person, Lakshya (portrayed by Laxmikant Berde in the prequel) is deceased, the same mantra can be used on his son. Tatya Vinchu vows to find Lakshya's son and transfer his soul into his body.

Meanwhile, at the village of Shrirangpur, a jatra (Indian village fair) has been organized dedicated to the village deity. Aditya Bolke (Adinath Kothare), the son of the late Lakshya and Aavdi (portrayed by Pooja Pawar in the prequel), is a mechanical engineer without a job, and like his father, is thoroughly interested in ventriloquism, and lives with his grandmother, Parubai (Madhu Kambikar). Aditya meets Megha (Sonalee Kulkarni), who is on a vacation and is a lavani dancer at her mother's (Vishakha Subhedar) theatre within the fair. Aditya and Megha fall in love with each other. Meanwhile, Makarand (Makarand Anaspure) has set up his puppet show and wishes to make a healthy profit from this fair. He has created a puppet which resembles Tatya Vinchu, after hearing the local legend, although he himself is skeptic about it.

Aditya frequently tries to meet Makarand and learn about ventriloquism, but is challenged by the puppet show's security guard (Deepak Shirke), and the chase often ends up funnily. Gauri Wagh (Sai Tamhankar) is a journalist and has arrived at Shrirangpur to cover a report on the fair. Meanwhile, Tatya Vinchu arrives at the fair and identifies Aditya as the son of Lakshya. Gauri, in a small incident, discovers that the puppet is, in fact, alive. Aditya accidentally gets hold of Tatya Vinchu, and after taking it home, discovers that the puppet is alive. However, being an engineer, Aditya believes that the puppet contains a tape recorder.

Meanwhile, Mumbai Police Commissioner Mahesh Jadhav (Mahesh Kothare) investigates the death of Kubdya Khavis and is notified that Baba Chamatkar (who had passed into a coma after being confronted by Tatya), has regained consciousness. Baba Chamatkar reveals to Mahesh that Tatya Vinchu has in fact been revived, leading Mahesh to instruct the police at Shrirangpur to find the puppet. Mahesh then travels to Shrirangpur and meets Inspector Sakharam (Vijay Chavan), who appeared as a constable in the prequel. Sakharam tells Mahesh that the puppet has been located (which is in fact the replica created by Makarand) and the police destroy the puppet in a bonfire.

On the last day of the fair, Makarand is confronted by Tatya Vinchu, who threatens him at knifepoint and takes him to Aditya's house. He confronts Parubai, who runs to Inspector Sakharam and tells him that Tatya Vinchu is on his way to Aditya, who is at a religious procession at the fair. Tatya Vinchu makes his way to Aditya who travels up the giant wheel to save himself, but the giant wheel gets stuck. Tatya Vinchu climbs up to Aditya and tries to recite the mantra on Aditya. However, Mahesh, who has been communicated by Sakharam, arrives at the scene on time and shoots Tatya Vinchu between his two eyebrows. Tatya Vinchu falls down, and is picked up by Mahesh, but Tatya Vinchu revives and uses Mahesh's gun to shoot him in the arm non-fatally. Tatya Vinchu begins to climb up the giant wheel and reach Aditya again, but Aditya picks up a coconut knife and severes Tatya Vinchu's head. Mahesh finds Tatya Vinchu's headless body and orders the police that the case is not closed until the severed head is found. In the closing scene, the police drive Mahesh away to take him to the hospital, while Tatya Vinchu's severed head under Mahesh's car is shown to be raising his eyebrows.

== Cast ==
- Adinath Kothare as Aditya Bolke
- Dilip Prabhavalkar as the voice of Tatya Vinchu
- Sonalee Kulkarni as Megha Satarkar
- Sai Tamhankar as Reporter Gauri Wagh
- Makarand Anaspure as Ventriloquist Makarand Vatvate
- Vishakha Subhedar as Champabai Satarkar; Megha's mother
- Madhu Kambikar as Parubai Bolke; Aditya's grandmother
- Mahesh Kothare as Mumbai Police Commissioner Mahesh Jadhav
- Raghvendra Kadkol as Baba Chamatkar
- Vijay Chavan as Inspector Sakharam
- Umesh Tonpe as Aditya's friend
- Abhijeet Chavan as Kubdya Khavis (Tatya Vinchu's sidekick)
- Jitendra Joshi as Vinayak Chitre/ V.Chitre (Cameo Appearance)

== Production ==
=== Development ===
The script of the film was penned by Mahesh Kothare and Ashok Patole, with Ashok Patole also responsible for writing the dialogues. Kothare aimed to update the narrative for modern audiences while retaining the essence of the original. In October 2012, the muhurta ceremony took place at N. D. Studio in Karjat.

The film was the first Marathi 3D film, marking a major milestone in regional cinema. Mahesh Kothare decided to shoot the entire film in 3D, utilizing a 4K resolution camera, which was the first time an Indian film had been shot in this format. Enrique Criado, a Spanish stereographer, was brought on board to handle 3D stereography and special effects. Around ₹1.7 crore was spent on 3D and visual effects. The film makers used Quasar Rig and Split Beam Technology to achieve the desired 3D effect. Suresh Deshmane served as the cinematographer, while Avadhoot Gupte composed the music and Guru Thakur wrote the lyrics. Nitin Chandrakant Desai was responsible for production design, and choreography was handled by Umesh Jadhav and Phulva Khamkar.

=== Casting ===
Mahesh Kothare, Madhu Kambikar, Vijay Chavan, and Raghvendra Kadkol have reprised their respective roles. Adinath Kothare took a central role in the film, joined by actors Sonalee Kulkarni, Makarand Anaspure, and Sai Tamhankar. Jitendra Joshi makes a cameo appearance. The iconic character of Kubdya Khavis, originally portrayed by Bipin Varti, is now played by Abhijeet Chavan. The puppet Tatya Vinchu, originally voiced by Dilip Prabhavalkar, reprised his role in Zapatlela 2. Ramdas Padhye, the ventriloquist and puppeteer who created and operated the original Tatya Vinchu, designed a more advanced puppet for the sequel. The team used animatronics, CGI, and VFX to bring Tatya Vinchu to life.

=== Filming ===
The entire production was completed in just 36 days.

== Release ==
=== Theatrical ===
The film was released on 7 June 2013 in theatres.

=== Marketing and distribution ===
Fox Star Studios handled the marketing and distribution. The marketing team was led by Niraj Josh.

== Reception ==
A reviewer from The Times of India gave 3.5 stars out of 5 stars and highlights that "Zapatlela 2" is an entertaining mix of comedy, thrills, and effective 3D effects. He appreciate the balance between humor and the chilling presence of the puppet Tatya Vinchu, noting that the film is family-friendly and features strong performances, especially from Adinath Kothare. While some parts may distract from the main plot, the overall execution keeps the audience engaged and laughing. Saumitra Pote of Maharashtra Times gave 2.5 stars out of 5 stars, wants to convey that the film impresses with its exceptional 3D technology and visual appeal, making it a captivating experience. However, it falls short in terms of story, screenplay, and dialogue, lacking coherence and depth. While it offers nostalgic connections to the first film and features notable performances.

== Soundtrack ==
Zapatlela 2

Soundtrack album by Avdhoot Gupte
- Released: May 2013
- Genre: Feature film soundtrack
- Length: 21:57
- Language: Marathi
- Label: Viacom 18 Motion Pictures

Avdhoot Gupte chronology
Tukaram (2012)	Zapatlela 2 (2013)	Rege (2014)

The film's soundtrack was composed by Avdhoot Gupte, with lyrics penned by Guru Thakur. The film's title theme track was composed by Aniruddha Kale.

=== Track list ===
No.	Title	Singer(s)	Length
1	"Kalajat Mukkam Kela"	Vaishali Samant	4:34
2	"Madanike"	Avadhoot Gupte, Janhvi Prabhu Arora	4:25
3	"Gajmukha" (Version 1)	Avadhoot Gupte, Vaishali Samant	4:21
4	"Gajmukha" (Version 2)	Avadhoot Gupte, Vaishali Samant, Swapnil Bandodkar	6:45
5	"Zapatlela" Theme	Avadhoot Gupte	2:32

== Sequel ==
Zapatlela 3 aka Zapatlela Mi Tatya Vinchu, In 2017, Mahesh Kothare announced his plans to create Zapatlela 3 aka Zapatlela Mi Tatya Vinchu, revealing that it is scheduled for a theatrical release in 2025.
