= Faster Fene =

2017 Indian film by Aditya Sarpotdar

- Theatrical release Poster
- Directed by: Aditya Sarpotdar
- Screenplay by: Kshitij Patwardhan
- Based on: Faster Fene by Bhaskar Ramachandra Bhagwat
- Produced by: Riteish Deshmukh; Genelia Deshmukh Mangesh Kulkarni
- Starring: Amey Wagh; Parna Pethe; Girish Kulkarni; Siddhartha Jadhav; Dilip Prabhavalkar
- Cinematography: Milind Jog
- Edited by: Faisal Mahadik; Imran Mahadik
- Music by: Troy Arif; Ajay Vas
- Production companies: Mumbai Film Company; Zee Studios
- Distributed by: Zee Studios
- Release date: 27 October 2017
- Country: India
- Language: Marathi
- Budget: ₹6 crore
- Box office: ₹8 crore

Faster Fene is a 2017 Marathi-language crime thriller film directed by Aditya Sarpotdar The film stars Amey Wagh in and as Faster Fene, based on the character created by Bhaskar Ramachandra Bhagwat and also stars National Award winning actor Girish Kulkarni in a negative role. Supporting star cast includes Parna Pethe, Chinmayi Sumit, Dilip Prabhavalkar and Siddharth Jadhav in supporting roles. Dilip Prabhavalkar plays the role of Bhaskar Ramachandra Bhagwat.

== Plot ==
Banesh Fene (Amey Wagh) is a wildlife enthusiast & spends most of his time in the forest treating birds. He is set to travel to Pune for 1 month for his medical entrance exam, for which his mother has arranged his stay at one of her relatives — B. R. Bhagwat (Bha. Ra.). Bha. Ra. is a renowned writer who now lives alone in Pune. The moment Banesh arrives at his place, he finds that a robbery has taken place. He concludes that it would take 3 hours for police to arrive due to a political event happening nearby & gives him time to figure out the thief. He starts tracing evidence & eventually traces a 10-year-old boy who attempted the robbery. He finds out that this boy with the pet name Bhu-Bhu is an orphan who is forced to steal in the attempted murder of a senior citizen to usurp all his wealth.

Banesh rescues Bhu-Bhu from the clutches of the goons and gets back to B. R. Bhagwat's home. Bha. Ra. is a kind man who adopts him, and rewards Banesh with a pen, which he used to write many of his books. Next, Banesh goes to the college where his exam is scheduled. There he meets another fellow student & they become friends in a short time. Banesh lends him one of his pens as he has forgotten his. After the exam, Banesh runs into his childhood friend Aboli & they exchange their numbers. He then rushes to find his friend to get back his pen. The examiner informs him that he left much before the scheduled time. Banesh is disappointed to lose the pen he got as a reward.

As Banesh is returning home, he reads in the newspaper that his friend has committed suicide. He is shocked as he found no suicidal symptoms, on the contrary, his friend was quite ambitious. He decides to investigate & goes to his hostel. There the police have completed the investigation & are about to return. The police mock Banesh's argument that it is a murder, masked as suicide. Later that night, he barges into the hostel & checks the CCTV footage. There he finds that after the exam, his friend is chased by the suspected murderer. 15 mins later the suspect comes out of the hostel in a petrified state & boards a rickshaw.

Banesh & Bhu-Bhu track down the rickshaw driver & question him about the suspect. From there they go to Swastik Lodge, where the suspect was staying for the past 15 days but has checked out earlier. They pose as his friends & enquire at the reception about forgotten stuff (as the suspect had hurriedly left the lodge after the murder). They collect one set of clothes which he had given for laundry & find a receipt from the photo-studio.

Banesh tracks down the photo-studio & gets all the details of the suspect. Meanwhile, the manager of Photo-studio informs his boss about Banesh who is trying to get information about the suspect. His boss is Appa, a mafia don who runs a syndicate that manipulates admissions to colleges. Banesh, with his sharp wit, is able to get rid of the goons & returns home. The name of the suspect is Amol & Banesh sets to find him. He finally locates him at the medical college at Tuljapur. Amol reveals that he is not the murderer, but hiding out of fear because he is an eyewitness. The goons of Appa also reach the college at the same time & Banesh once again rescues Amol & himself from them.

Later Amol reveals the complete sequence of events. Amol is a coach for medical entrance exams & approached by Appa's men to appear as a dummy for some other student. Amol coming from a poor family is enticed by the money & agrees to do it. That's how he comes to Pune & appears for the exam. He is identified by Banesh's friend who was a student at Amol's coaching institute & figures out the whole thing. He informs the examiner & requests him to call the principal. The examiner is part of Appa's syndicate & he calls Appa instead of the principal. Appa comes to the college & stalks him to his hostel. There they murder him to erase all the evidence. Amol witnesses this & runs away from the scene.

Banesh tries to understand Amol's dilemma and leaves him at Bhagwat's house. Bhagwat promises Banesh that he would take care of Amol. At night, when Banesh and Bhu-bhu leave to track Appa, Appa's henchmen attack B.R. Bhagwat's house and injure him. When Banesh returns, he asks Bhagwat about Amol and Bhagwat says that he has locked Amol in the wardrobe to keep him safe. Appa calls Banesh and tells him that Pillai has captured Aboli and if he wants that Aboli, Bhagwat and him to be safe;Then he should bring Amol to his place.

Banesh hospitalizes Bhagwat and brings Amol to the goon's place. There he goes away with Aboli and Amol shouts at him saying that he is a cheater. The goons later realize that the person they captured is not really Amol, but he is Rahul Khamkar, who was the student in place of whom Amol was giving the exam. Rahul is revealed to be the son of the education minister. Banesh manages to showcase Rahul and Amol's confession in front of media in a conference. Banesh chases Appa to the roof and sedates him with his own insulin pen. He tells Appa that he has no way out as the police have found his black money. Appa and his goons are captured along with the education minister and other associates. Dhanesh gets a good result and Banesh let's his father know that his son will be a good example to all other students. Bhagwat goes in his room and starts writing his first novel based on Banesh named as "Faster Fene".

== Cast ==
- Amey Wagh as Banesh Fene
- Parna Pethe as Aboli
- Girish Kulkarni as Appa
- Siddharth Jadhav as Ambaadas
- Dilip Prabhavalkar as B.R. Bhagwat
- Shubham More as Bhu Bhu
- Anshuman Joshi as Amol
- Om Bhutkar as Dhanesh

== Soundtrack ==
The film has only one promotional song, sung by Riteish Deshmukh composed by Arko Pravo Mukherjee and lyrics written by Prashant Ingole

No.	Title	Singer(s)	Length
1.	"FaFe Song"	Riteish Deshmukh	2:52

== Box office ==
The movie made fantastic collections across Maharashtra as it collected around ₹8 crore (US$830,000) over the first weekend.
