= Tatya Vinchu =

Fictional character

- Zapatlela character
- Tatya Vinchu in a promotional image for Zapatlela 2 (2013)
- First appearance: Zapatlela; (1993)
- Last appearance: Zapatlela 2; (2013)
- Created by: Mahesh Kothare
- Designed by: Ramdas Padhye
- Portrayed by: Dilip Prabhavalkar (human role)
- Voiced by: Dilip Prabhavalkar
- Performed by: Ramdas Padhye (Note: Padhye control devices like rods or strings are used to manipulate gestures, movements, and, in some cases, the body, head, limbs, mouth, and eyes. He was assisted by his wife Aparna for both aspects and by son Satyajit Padhye for the latter.)

In-universe information
- Alias: Tatya Bichoo (Note: In the 1995 Hindi dubbed version of Zapatlela, titled Khilona Bana Khalnayak (translation:The toy became a villain), the name Tatya Bichoo is used for Tatya Vinchu.)
- Species: Human (formerly); Killer toy
- Gender: Male
- Occupation: Criminal mastermind
- Fighting style: Strangling
- Origin: Mumbai, Maharashtra, India
- Supernatural ability: Mrityunjay Mantra
- Allies: Kubdya Khavis (deceased); Baba Chamatkar (deceased)

Tatya Vinchu (/ˈtɑːtjə ˈvɪntʃuː/, Marathi pronunciation: [ˈtɑːt̪jɑː ˈvɪ̃ntʃʊː]), also known as Tatya Bichoo (in Hindi) (/ˈbiːtʃuː/), is an antagonist from the Marathi-language comedy horror Zapatlela franchise. Created by Mahesh Kothare, designed by Ramdas Padhye, and voiced by Dilip Prabhavalkar, Tatya Vinchu is a possessed puppet who seeks to find the son, Aditya Bolke (played by Adinath Kothare) of his former prey Laxmikant Bolke (portrayed by Laxmikant Berde), with the goal of becoming human once again.

== Fictional biography ==
Tatya Vinchu, a criminal from Mumbai, had built his empire through violence. However, his ambitions were not limited to power alone—he desired immortality. To achieve this, he sought out a sorcerer named Baba Chamatkar in search of the 'Mrityunjaya' mantra. This was a powerful incantation that could transfer his soul into any object or living being.

In a violent encounter with the police, Tatya was critically wounded. However, in a last act of defiance, he used the mantra to transfer his soul into a doll. Even after his death, Tatya's wicked spirit persisted in the form of the doll, unleashing a reign of terror in Shrirangpur.

In the sequel, Tatya's soul remains trapped in the puppet. Kubdya Khavis, a former sidekick, seeks to revive Tatya in hopes of retrieving a hidden stash of stolen diamonds. He convinces Baba Chamatkar to bring Tatya back, but the revival is incomplete. A drop of Kubdya's blood is the catalyst that reanimates Tatya's soul.

Reawakened, Tatya seeks to possess Aditya, the son of his former victim Lakshya. He believes that by possessing Aditya's body, he can regain his full strength and complete his quest for immortality.

=== Powers and abilities ===
Tatya Vinchu reciting the Mrityunjay Mantra on Laxmikant "Lakshya" Bolke (portrayed by Laxmikant Berde).

Tatya Vinchu has many supernatural abilities, including the ability to transfer his soul into objects (living or non-living) using the Mrityunjay Mantra (acquired from wizard Baba Chamatkar at Baba Chamtkar Mokshadham in Mumbai). The Mrityunjay Mantra was first implicated when Tatya Vinchu and Baba Chamatkar were challenging one another for the acquisition of immortality. Tatya's change from being a human threat to a supernatural being started when Baba was forced to share the Mrityunjay Mantra with Tatya. Both Zapatlela (1993) and Zapatlela 2 (2013) focus on the manuel's ability to own, resurrect, and live in various forms, such as in a puppet. In addition, while inside an object, Tatya has the ability to control the object without regard for his own physical limitations, i.e., animate the object and use it to harm or frighten others. Tatya's physical strength and resistance to violence continue in puppet form.

Recitation of the Mrityunjay Mantra. Duration: 16 seconds.

Tatya's intelligence and strategical ability also contribute to his success, particularly in the quest for his new host (Aditya). Ultimately, however, Tatya is vulnerable to very exact physical actions, which leads to his defeat.

Mrityunjay Mantra (Note: In the poster released by the makers for Zapatlela 2, this mantra is written in devnagari script as – see.)

Aim bhagabhugē bhaginī bhāgodarī bhāgamāsē yavanī om phaṭ svāhā Aim rim klim bhai bho klim klim om phaṭ svāhā

=== Weakness ===
Mahesh Jadhav (played by Mahesh Kothare) is a police officer who successfully shoots the Tatya Vinchu, preventing him from possessing another body.

Tatya Vinchu has many powers and strengths but he relies solely on his puppet form to interact with the world; therefore, he cannot engage anyone directly. Secondly, due to his overconfidence, he underestimates the resourcefulness of his opponents. CID Inspector Mahesh Jadhav exploited these weaknesses with his tactical skills and determination to win against Tatya Vinchu. In the end, through the use of quick thinking and bravery, Mahesh was able to shoot Tatya Vinchu between the eyebrows, the only way to bring an end to him. This great feat made it impossible for Tatya Vinchu to possess Lakshya and Aditya after Mahesh's victory; thus, Mahesh's conviction sealed the fate of Tatya Vinchu forever.

== Development ==
=== Character creation ===
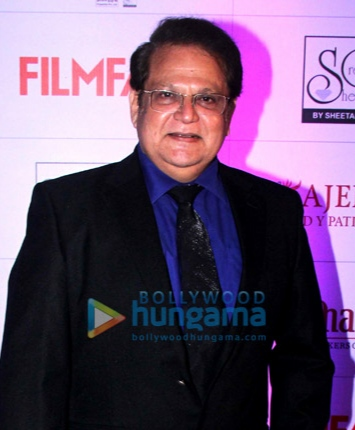
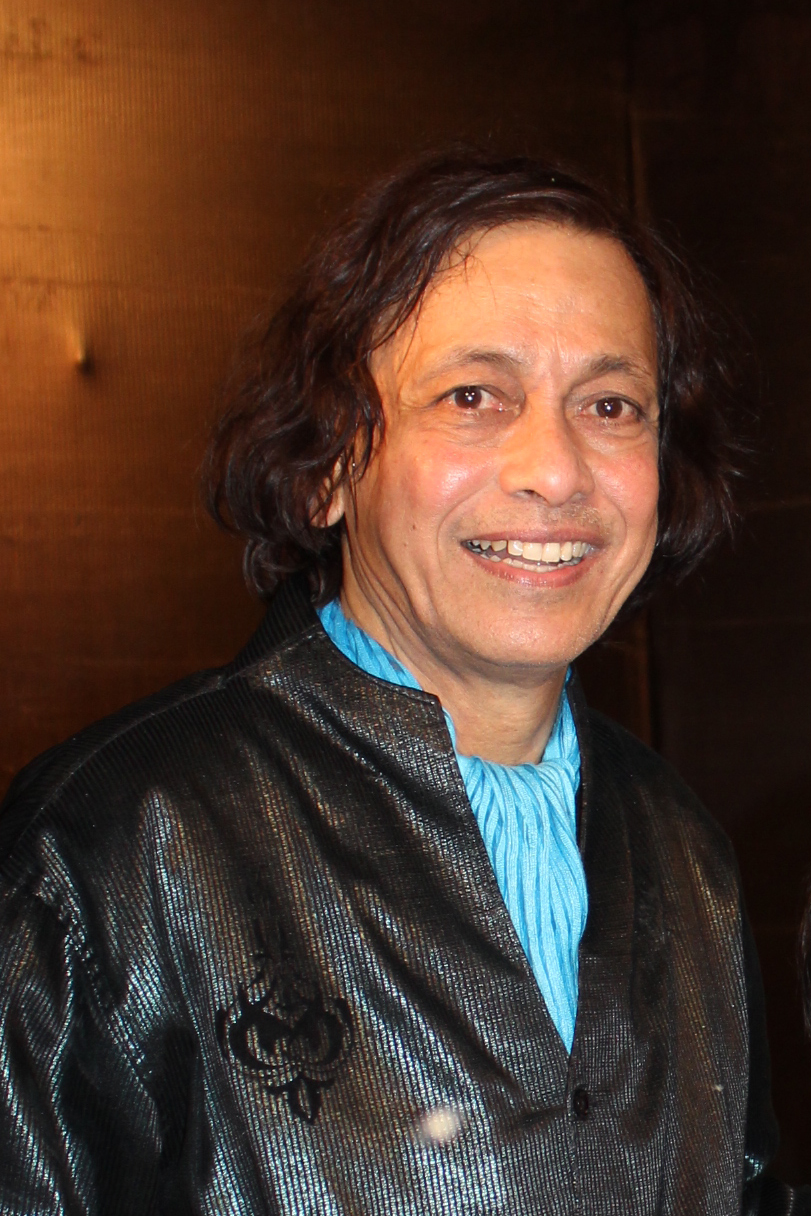
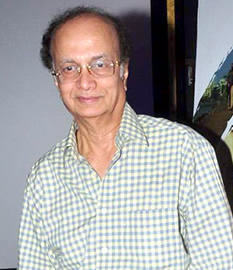
Mahesh Kothare developed the character of Tatya Vinchu, while Ramdas Padhye designed its puppet version. The human role of Tatya Vinchu was portrayed by Dilip Prabhavalkar.

Mahesh Kothare observed the work of ventriloquist Ramdas Padhye, especially how well Padhye interacted with his dummy, Ardhavatrao, as lifelike, and created Tatya Vinchu from this experience. During one of Padhye's performances, Kothare was garlanded by Ardhavatrao, and this made a lasting impression on Kothare. After attending one of Padhye's workshops, Kothare further developed this idea of creating a puppet that can talk by itself (independently speaking). When Kothare ultimately went to Padhye with the Zapatlela script, his character's brief description was that the puppet should be sweet and likeable initially, until he became a possessed, runaway puppet. Initially Kothare offered to buy a doll from the United States for the character; however, Padhye had different ideas regarding how the character's appearance should be visualized. A month after Kothare's Ganeshotsav visit, Padhye came to Kothare to discuss the plan for the character.

Kothare developed the character Tatya Vinchu through his interpretation of the contrast between a horror and comedy genre and by merging elements of influence from western culture into eastern culture; the use of the name "Tatya," derives from Kothare's make-up artist to represent Kothare's influence and "Vinchu," meaning 'scorpion' in Marathi reflects the thematic elements of the former genre while introducing a distinct regional element to the character. In addition, Tatya Vinchu has been partially inspired by Chucky, the antagonist in the 1988 American horror film Child's Play (1988).

=== Design ===
The design of Tatya Vinchu was created for puppeteer Ramdas Padhye, who intended to create a marshmallow doll (a voicing puppet), which incorporated humorous and frightening aspects along with western influences, like "Mamooji," a character from the 1983 film Mahaan. Mamooji had a square-shaped head with oversized nostrils and a large, curled toe shaped like a clown, these characteristics would later be an influence to Tatya Vinchu. The design intended for Tatya Vinchu was also that of a ventriloquist type puppet with moving limbs, with moving lips, eyebrows, neck and, eyes to create helpful expressiveness. The clothing worn by Tatya Vinchu, is style of western origin and contrasted with the rural surroundings depicted in the film and indicated the disconnect between the two cultures. Ramdas Padhye noted that he incorporated "pressure points" into Tatya Vinchu's face, which allows for emotional facial expressions that are close to real human facial expression.

Padhye developed multiple versions of the puppet to suit different scenes: a half-body puppet for close-ups, a live-hand puppet for gestures (such as strangling), a marionette for walking sequences, a non-articulating version for actor manipulation, and a damaged puppet for death scenes. In the movie, Padhye developed 8 dolls, none of which Kothare liked. Kothare ended up liking Ramdas' 9th doll, which was the starting point for Kothare to become Tatya Vinchu in the movie. The operation of the puppet was a great challenge as there were no live monitors or video playback available; therefore, the puppeteer had to be hidden from the camera and rely solely on his judgment for precise performance.

In "Zapatlela 2", Tatya Vinchu went through another redesign to feature a foam exterior with latex and rubber on the inside for better durability and flexibility. Ramdas Padhye worked with his wife Aparna and son Satyajit to build Tatya Vinchu's new puppet. To give Tatya Vinchu lifelike motion, remote- and radio-controlled actuators were installed to aid in achieving this realism. Incorporating this added technology within a compact shell was very challenging. The total time spent on design was approximately four months with a total of approximately forty days of designing motion for the puppet.

=== Casting ===
Dilip Prabhavalkar was cast as Tatya Vinchu for his unique style of acting and diverse range of skills. Mahesh Kothare and Ashok Patole saw one important aspect of Dilip's performance: the depth he would bring to Tatya Vinchu's character. After a series of discussions on the character and its attributes, the concept was shared with Prabhavalkar. In addition, Prabhavalkar did the voice for Tatya Vinchu. Kothare later stated that Prabhavalkar's contribution, along with Patole's writing, played a significant role in shaping Tatya Vinchu into one of Marathi cinema's most recognised antagonists.

== Appearances ==
Tatya Vinchu appears in both Zapatlela (1993) and Zapatlela 2 (2013). In the first film, after being mortally wounded in a shootout, Tatya transfers his soul into a puppetwhich becomes a source of terror in Shrirangpur. In the second film, his soul is resurrected, and he embarks on a new spree of violence, this time with the added goal of finding hidden diamonds and possessing Aditya, the son of his former victim Laxmikant Bolke.

Tatya Vinchu is also set to return in the upcoming third installment, Zapatlela Mi Tatya Vinchu, which is in development. The character will be created digitally using Artificial Intelligence, as confirmed by Mahesh Kothare.

== Legacy and impact ==
Tatya Vinchu has become an iconic character in Marathi cinema, widely regarded as one of the most memorable villains in Indian film history. (Note: Multiple references) His influence extends beyond the film world. In 2020, during the COVID-19 pandemic, a humorous public service announcement featuring Tatya Vinchu went viral, emphasizing social distancing and handwashing. The character remains a popular figure in memes and pop culture, continuing to captivate audiences even decades after his creation. In 2023, on the 30th anniversary of Tatya Vinchu's creation, Satyajit Padhye (son of Ramdas Padhye) shared behind-the-scenes pictures from the making of Zapatlela.

In 2024, Maharashtra Times placed Tatya Vinchu at the top of their list of the most famous villains in Marathi cinema.

== In popular culture ==
- In the Zapatlela's 2001 Telugu remake Ammo Bomma, Tatya Vinchu's character is reimagined as Gangaram.
- In the 2012 film Tatya Vinchu Lage Raho, which stars Sanjay Narvekar, the title and the animated character are named after the Tatya Vinchu.
