= Mahesh Kothare =

Indian Actor, Writer, Producer, Director

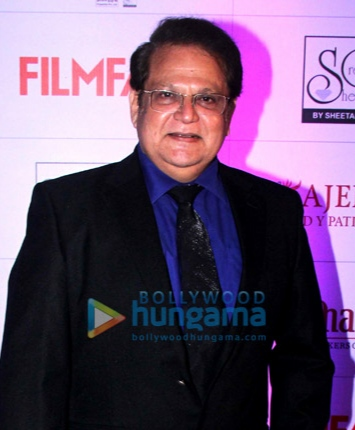
- Kothare in 2014
- Born: 28 September 1953 (age 73); Mumbai, Maharashtra, India
- Occupations: Actor; director; producer
- Years active: 1964 – present
- Spouse: Nilima Kothare (m. 1980)
- Children: Adinath Kothare (son)
- Family: Kothare family

Mahesh Kothare (Marathi: [məɦeːʃ koʈʰaːɾe], born 28 September 1953), is an Indian actor, director, producer, and screenwriter widely regarded as one of the most successful film directors and a pioneering figure in Marathi cinema. Over a career spanning more than six decades, he has received multiple accolades, including six Maharashtra State Film Awards, five Filmfare Awards Marathi and three Screen Awards Marathi.

He began his career as a child artist in the early 1960s, making his screen debut in the Marathi film Chhota Jawan (1963). He gained wider recognition as "Master Mahesh" through his appearances in Hindi films such as Raja Aur Runk (1968) and Ghar Ghar Ki Kahani (1970). As an adult, he took on lead and negative roles in Marathi films, including as an unfaithful husband in Lek Chalali Sasarla (1984), before turning to direction in the mid-1980s. He made his directorial debut with the fantasy comedy Dhum Dhadaka (1985), a major box-office success that established his signature style of blending comedy, fantasy, and action. He followed it with hits such as De Danadan (1987), Thartharat (1989), Dhadakebaaz (1990), Zapatlela (1993) and Majha Chakula (1994), and introduced several technological innovations to Marathi cinema, including CinemaScope, Dolby Digital sound, and stereoscopic 3D. As an actor, he became especially known for his recurring portrayals of police inspectors across several of these films, a persona that remained closely associated with him throughout his career.

He went on to direct further successes including Chimani Pakhar (2001), which introduced Dolby Digital sound, Pachhadlela (2004), the first Marathi film to use computer-generated imagery, and Khabardar (2005). He revived his best-known creation with Zapatlela 2 (2013), which became the first Marathi film shot in true 3D, and remains his last film directed to date. He also directed two Hindi films: Masoom (1996), a successful remake of Majha Chakula, and Lo Main Aa Gaya (1999), a remake of De Danadan that turned out to be a box-office disaster.

He is the founder of Kothare Vision, a production house he later ran alongside his son, actor-director Adinath Kothare, producing numerous successful Marathi television serials and films. In 2023, he published his autobiography, Damn It Ani Barach Kahi.

Kothare has been married to Nilima Kothare since 1980; their son, Adinath, is also an actor and director.

== Early life ==
Kothare was born on 28 September 1953 in Bombay, Maharashtra. He was born into a family associated with the performing arts, which influenced his interest in acting and filmmaking from an early age. His father, Amber Kothare, was a Marathi theatre actor and producer; he died on 21 January 2023 at the age of 96, while his mother, Saroj Kothare (also known as Jemna), was associated with All India Radio; she died on 15 July 2023 at the age of 93.

== Career ==
=== Child actor and early acting career (1963–1984) ===
Kothare entered the film industry as "Master Mahesh" in the early 1960s, making his screen debut in Ram Gabale's Marathi film Chhota Jawan (1963). He also appeared as a child artist in several Hindi productions, including Raja Aur Runk, in which he played a double role; Mere Lal, in which he played an orphaned boy adopted by a dacoit; and Upkar, in which he portrayed the childhood version of Manoj Kumar's character. As a child actor, he received the most recognition for his role in Raja Aur Runk, where he was featured alongside Nirupa Roy in the popular song "Tu Kitni Achhi Hai Tu Kitni Bholi Hai O Maa."

After graduating, Kothare took on lead roles in 1975, starring in the Marathi film Preet Tujhi Majhi and later in the Hindi film Yeh Kaisa Nashaa Hai, though the Hindi film failed to make a mark. He also featured in the Gujarati film Mari Hel Utaro Raj alongside Ravindra Mahajani. He then returned to Marathi cinema, taking on supporting and character roles in films such as Devta, Gupchup Gupchup, and Thorali Jau. During this period, he also appeared in negative roles, notably in Lek Chalali Sasarla (1984), where he played a man who sets his wife (played by Alka Kubal) on fire, and Gharcha Bhedi (1984), where he played a con man. These years helped establish him within the Marathi film industry.

=== Breakthrough as director and commercial success (1985–1993) ===
Kothare made his directorial debut with Dhum Dhadaka (1985), a comedy produced under his own banner, Jenma Films International, and loosely based on the Tamil film Kaadhalikka Neramillai. Starring himself alongside Ashok Saraf, Laxmikant Berde, Nivedita Joshi, and Prema Kiran, the film became a major box-office success and is widely credited as a trendsetter that drew younger audiences back to Marathi cinema. It went on to win the Filmfare Award (Marathi) for Best Film, with Kothare also winning Best Director. Building on this success, he directed, and starred in De Danadan (1987), an action comedy in which he played Inspector Mahesh Danke, a young police officer who, alongside his cousin and fellow constable Lakshya (Laxmikant Berde), uncovers a crime ring in a fictional village that is secretly run by the very benefactor the two had trusted. He followed it with Thartharat (1989), co-written and directed by Kothare and produced by Arvind Samant, in which he played CID Inspector Mahesh Jadhav; the first fully developed appearance of the police-inspector persona that would recur through much of his later acting career. The story pairs his character with a small-town newspaperman, again played by Berde, as the two join forces to confront a criminal known as Taklu Haiwan, who terrorizes a village after a fabricated news story inadvertently draws him there. It marked Kothare and Berde's third collaboration and consolidated the pairing that Marathi audiences had come to associate with Kothare's brand of action comedy.

Kothare's directorial work through the early 1990s included Dhadakebaaz (1990), a fantasy-tinged action comedy in which Laxmikant Berde played a dual role as a small-time con man and his genie-like lookalike, Gangaram, who is bound to grant wishes from a magic bottle until its supply of enchanted sand runs out. He co-wrote the screenplay, produced the film under Jenma Films International, and again played one of the three lead friends, alongside Berde and Deepak Shirke; the production is best remembered as the first Marathi film shot in CinemaScope, using anamorphic widescreen lenses that were then new to the regional industry. In 1993, he directed and produced Jiwalagaa, starring newcomers Tushar Dalvi and Resham Tipnis in the lead, while Berde played a secondary role that didn't go down well with audiences due to which it was an average performer at the box office. His biggest hit of the decade came with Zapatlela (1993), a horror-comedy that introduced Tatya Vinchu, a ventriloquist's dummy that comes to life. The character was created by ventriloquist and puppeteer Ramdas Padhye and voiced by actor Dilip Prabhavalkar, and it went on to become a cult figure in Marathi popular culture. The film itself ran for more than 100 days in theatres and was remade in Telugu in 2001 with the title Ammo Bomma.

=== Expansion and technical innovations (1994–2007) ===
He also directed the Hindi-language film Masoom (1996), starring Inder Kumar, Ayesha Jhulka and Omkar Kapoor a remake of his own 1994 Marathi hit Majha Chakula, in which a young boy is kidnapped by the gangster responsible for killing his father and must escape captivity with the help of a crusading journalist. The film performed strongly at the domestic box office. Majha Chakula won him Best Film and Best Director awards at the Maharashtra State Film Awards and Screen Awards, it also marked the last collaboration between Kothare and Nivedita Joshi.

He returned to Hindi cinema with Lo Main Aa Gaya (1999), a fantasy-action film in which a young police constable named Ajay acquires the divine powers of Bajrangbali and uses them to fight crime. It was a remake of his own 1987 Marathi hit De Danadan, with Laxmikant Berde reprising a constable role, though this time in a supporting part rather than the lead.The film reportedly left Kothare in significant debt, from which it took him roughly a decade to recover, and it stands as his last Hindi directorial venture.

In 2000, he directed a mystery-comedy Khatarnak, in which he once again played CID Inspector investigating a string of murders that occur every Amavasya in a small town; the film, his twelfth collaboration with Laxmikant Berde, also marked the Marathi debut of comedian Johnny Lever and actor Bharat Jadhav. He is credited with bringing Dolby Digital sound to Marathi cinema through the film Chimani Pakhar, starring Padmini Kolhapure and Sachin Khedekar. In 2004, he directed and produced Pachhadlela, described as the first Marathi film to use computer animation, it was a huge commercial success making one of the highest grossing Marathi films.

In 2005, Kothare wrote, produced, and directed Khabardar, a comedy loosely inspired by the 1940 American film His Girl Friday, starring Bharat Jadhav as a newspaper reporter and Sanjay Narvekar as a truck driver wrongly implicated in a murder. It opened with an on-screen tribute to Laxmikant Berde, who had died shortly before production began and had originally been considered for a role in it. He followed this with Zabardast (2007), a science-fiction comedy he wrote and directed, in which a young man played by Pushkar Jog acquires a coat with extraordinary powers and uses it in an attempt to win over the woman he loves.

=== Later career and television productions (2008–present) ===
In 2008, Kothare directed Full 3 Dhamaal, a comedy about three childhood friends reuniting for a holiday while their husbands are away. The film was produced by his son, Adinath Kothare, under the newly formed banner Kothare & Kothare Vision (later Kothare Vision), marking the father-son duo's first collaboration under the company.

Kothare revived his best-known creation with Zapatlela 2 (2013), the sequel to his 1993 hit, starring his son Adinath Kothare in the lead role. The film brought back the character of Tatya Vinchu using 3D, animatronics, and computer-generated imagery, and was shot using split-beam 3D technology under Spanish stereographer Enrique Criado at ND Studios, Karjat. Released on 7 June 2013, it became the first Marathi film shot in true 3D and had a successful 100-day theatrical run.

Through Kothare Vision, he expanded into television production, beginning with the Marathi daily soap Man Udhan Varyache (2009–2011) on Star Pravah. The company went on to produce several long-running serials, including the mythological dramas Jai Malhar (2014–2017) and Vithu Mauli (2017–2020), both based on Maharashtrian deities, as well as Sukh Mhanje Nakki Kay Asta! (2020–2024), Pinkicha Vijay Aso! (2022–2024), Savlyachi Janu Savali (2024–present), and Nashibvan (2025–2026), the lattermost starring Adinath in lead.

Kothare also served as an associate producer on Paani (2024), a drama directed and starred by Adinath and produced by Priyanka Chopra's Purple Pebble Pictures in association with Kothare Vision. Based on the real-life efforts of activist Hanumant Kendre to resolve a water crisis in his drought-hit Marathwada village, the film had earlier won the National Film Award for Best Film on Environment Conservation/Preservation.

== Personal life ==
Kothare is married to Nilima Kothare since 1980. The couple have one son, Adinath Kothare, an actor, director and producer. Adinath was married to actress Urmila Kanetkar from 2011 until their divorce in 2026, and the couple have a daughter, Jizah, born in 2018.

Mahesh Kothare and Adinath jointly run the production house Kothare Vision. In 2023, Kothare published his autobiography, Damn It Ani Barach Kahi, reflecting on a career and personal journey spanning more than six decades in Indian cinema.

== Filmography ==
=== Films ===
Year	Title	Actor	Director	Producer	Role	Language	Notes	Ref.
1964	Chota Jawan	Yes	No	No	Jawan	Marathi	Child actor	
1964	Sant Nivrutti Dnyandev	Yes	No	No	Dnyaneshwar	Marathi	Child actor	
1966	Mere Lal	Yes	No	No	Bachchu	Hindi	Child actor	
1967	Upkar	Yes	No	No	Young Bharat	Hindi	Child actor	
1968	Raja Aur Runk	Yes	No	No	Yuvraj Narendradev / Raja	Hindi	Child actor	
1970	Safar	Yes	No	No	Montu Kapoor	Hindi	Child actor	
1971	Ghar Ghar Ki Kahani	Yes	No	No	Ravi	Hindi	Child actor	
1975	Preet Tujhi Majhi	Yes	No	No	Ravi	Marathi		
1977	Mari Hel Utaro Raj	Yes	No	No		Gujarati		
1981	Yeh Kaisa Nashaa Hai	Yes	No	No		Hindi		
1982	Sant Gyaneshwar	Yes	No	No	Dnyaneshwar	Marathi		
1982	Thorli Jaau	Yes	No	No	Avinash	Marathi		
1982	Chandane Shimpit Ja	Yes	No	No		Marathi		
1983	Devta	Yes	No	No	Sunil	Marathi		
1983	Paaygoon	Yes	No	No	Dhanaji Jadhav/Nagesh Patil	Marathi		
1983	Gupchup Gupchup	Yes	No	No	Ashok	Marathi		
1984	Sage Soyare	Yes	No	No	Hemant	Marathi		
1984	Lek Chalali Sasarla	Yes	No	No	Vilas Inamdar	Marathi		
1984	Gharcha Bhedi	Yes	No	No	Ramesh	Marathi		
1985	Dhum Dhadaka	Yes	Yes	Yes	Mahesh Javalkar	Marathi		
1986	Bhabhi Na Het	Yes	No	No		Gujarati		
1987	De Danadan	Yes	Yes	Yes	Sub-Inspector Mahesh Danke	Marathi		
1989	Thartharat	Yes	Yes	Yes	CID Inspector Mahesh Jadhav	Marathi		
1990	Dhadakebaaz	Yes	Yes	Yes	Mahesh Nemade	Marathi		
1992	Jiwalagaa	Yes	Yes	Yes		Marathi	Guest appearance	
1993	Zapatlela	Yes	Yes	Yes	CID Inspector Mahesh Jadhav	Marathi		
1994	Majha Chakula	Yes	Yes	Yes	Inspector Mahesh Jadhav	Marathi		
1996	Masoom	No	Yes	No		Hindi	Guest appearance	
1999	Lo Main Aagaya	No	Yes	Yes		Hindi		
1999	Dhangad Dhinga	Yes	Yes	Yes	Advocate Mahesh Mithare	Marathi		
2000	Khatarnak	Yes	Yes	No	CID Inspector Mahesh Choudhary	Marathi		
2001	Chimani Pakhar	No	Yes	No		Marathi	Guest appearance	
2004	Pachhadlela	Yes	Yes	Yes	Inspector Mahesh Jadhav	Marathi	Guest appearance	
2005	Khabardar	Yes	Yes	Yes	Himself	Marathi	Guest appearance	
2005	Soon Ladki Sasarchi	Yes	No	No		Marathi		
2006	Shubh Mangal Savdhan	No	Yes	No		Marathi		
2007	Zabardast	Yes	Yes	No	Professor Bramhanand Bharadwaj	Marathi	Guest appearance	
2008	Full 3 Dhamaal	Yes	Yes	No	Himself	Marathi	Guest appearance	
2010	Ved Laavi Jeeva	No	Yes	No		Marathi		
2010	Subhmangal Savadhan	No	Yes	No		Marathi		
2010	Ideachi Kalpana	Yes	No	No	Commissioner Mahesh Thakur	Marathi		
2011	Dubhang	No	Yes	No		Marathi		
2013	Zapatlela 2	Yes	Yes	Yes	Mahesh Jadhav	Marathi		
2024	Paani	No	No	Yes		Marathi		

=== Television ===
- Anolkhi Disha (2011–2012)

== Awards and recognition ==
Year	Awards	Category	Film	Result
1986	Filmfare Awards Marathi	Best Film	Dhum Dhadaka	Won
1986	Filmfare Awards Marathi	Best Director	Dhum Dhadaka	Won
2017	Filmfare Awards Marathi	Limelight Award	—N/a	Honoured
2021	Filmfare Awards Marathi	Excellence in Marathi cinema	—N/a	Honoured
2025	Filmfare Awards Marathi	Best Film	Paani	Won
1994	Maharashtra State Film Awards	Best Film III	Majha Chakula	Won
1994	Maharashtra State Film Awards	Best Director III	Majha Chakula	Won
2005	Maharashtra State Film Awards	Best Film III	Khabardar	Won
2005	Maharashtra State Film Awards	Best Director III	Khabardar	Won
2005	Maharashtra State Film Awards	Best Screenplay	Khabardar	Won
2009	Maharashtra State Film Awards	V. Shantaram Special Contribution Award	—N/a	Honoured
2013	Maharashtracha Favourite Kon	Favourite Film	Zapatlela 2	Nominated
2013	Maharashtracha Favourite Kon	Favourite Director	Zapatlela 2	Nominated
1994	Screen Awards	Best Marathi Film	Majha Chakula	Won
1994	Screen Awards	Best Marathi Director	Majha Chakula	Won
2000	Screen Awards	Best Marathi Director	Khatarnak	Won
