= Mumbaicha Dabewala =

- Theatrical release poster
- Directed by: Manohar Sarvankar
- Produced by: Mukund Vitkar
- Starring: Bharat Jadhav; Deepali Saiyyed; Smita Gondkar; Madhu Kambikar
- Music by: Raamlaxman
- Release date: 28 December 2007
- Country: India
- Language: Marathi

Mumbaicha Dabewala is a Marathi movie released on 28 December 2007. Produced by Mukund Vitkar and directed by Manohar Sarvankar.

== Cast ==
- Vijay Chavan
- Bharat Jadhav
- Deepali Saiyyed
- Smita Gondkar
- Madhu Kambikar

== Soundtrack ==
The music is provided by Ram Laxman.
