= Smita Gondkar =

Indian film actress

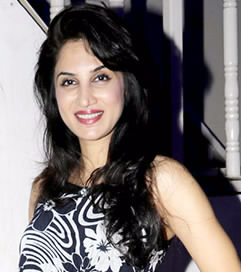
- Smita Gondkar in 2015
- Born: 5 November 1984 (age 41); Mysore, India
- Occupations: Actress; model
- Years active: 2007–present
- Notable work: Hai Tujhe Salaam India, Bigg Boss Marathi 1 Mumbaicha Dabewala
- Spouse: Siddharth Bantiya (m. 2015; div. 2017)
- Website: http://www.smita-gondkar.com

Smita Gondkar is an Indian actress who works primarily in Marathi and Hindi films. She was also featured in the Marathi music video "Pappi De Parula".

She was a contestant in Bigg Boss Marathi 1.

== Career ==
Smita Gondkar has worked in the United States with Disney Cruise Line alongside people from 55 nations. She was the only female semi-finalist on the show MTV Stuntmania in 2009. She started her career with Marathi films like Mumbaicha Dabewala, Satya-More Than Human, Hip Hip Hurrah and Bayko No.1.

== Filmography ==
=== Films ===
Year	Movie	Role	Ref.
2007	Mumbaicha Dabewala	Annie Rajapurkar	
2007	Ek Krantiveer		
2008	Satya		
2009	Vijay Dinanath Chauhan	Sheetal	
2010	Ek Adalat	Anjali	
2010	Target	Komal	
2011	Ashi Fasli Na Nanachi Tang	Poonam	
2011	Hip Hip Hurray	Charvi	
2012	Maya	Maya	
2013	Majhya Navryachi Bayko	Harishchandra's love interest	
2014	Main Hoon Part-Time Killer	Madhu	
2015	Just Gammat	Meera	
2015	Mr. & Mrs. Unwanted	Riya	
2016	Wanted Bayko No. 1	Priya	
2016	Toh Ani Me	Dancer	
2017	Machiwarla Budha	Phula	
2018	Bhay	Meera Joshi	
2018	Love Betting	Nikhil's love interest	
2018	Sobat		
2019	Ye Re Ye Re Paisa 2	Kavya	
2020	Gadbad Gondhal	Gargi	
2020	Bas Kuch Din Ki Baat Hai	Smita	
2022	Hai Tujhe Salaam India	Zoya	
2022	Chandramukhi	Mansi Prakash	
2023	Baloch	Ratna	
2023	Dil Dosti Deewangi	Riya	
2024	The AI Dharma Story	Nikita	
2026	Layak Nalayak	TBA	

=== Television ===
Year	Show	Role	Notes	Ref.
2009	MTV Stuntmania	Contestant	Semi-Finalist	
2018	Bigg Boss Marathi (season 1)	Contestant	2nd Runner Up	
2019	Bigg Boss Marathi (season 2)	Guest	For BB Hotel Task	
2020-2021	Comedy Bimedy	Host		
2021	Kaay Ghadla Tya Ratri?	Sanjana Raghav	Parallel lead	
2022	Bigg Boss Marathi (season 4)	Guest	For special task	

=== Music videos ===
Year	Song	Artist	Notes
