= Mr & Mrs Unwanted =

2016 film

- Directed by: Dinesh Anant
- Screenplay by: Prakash Gawade, Dinesh Anant
- Story by: Prakash Gawade, Dinesh Anant
- Produced by: Urvi Enterprises; Mitang Bhupendra Raval
- Starring: Rajendra Shisatkar, Smita Gondkar
- Release date: 23 September 2016
- Country: India
- Language: Marathi

Mr & Mrs Unwanted is 2016 Indian Marathi Social Film starring Rajendra Shisatkar and Smita Gondkar. It is directed by Dinesh Anant and produced by Mitang Bhupendra Raval. The movie also got nominated in KIFF & NIFF where they grabbed 'Best Jury Mention Film' Award & Best Actress Award at KIFF and 'Best Social Film' Award at NIFF.

== Plot ==
A story of a corporate working couple, a catch between their professions and their personal Life. Riya and Rajesh are happily staying together at a friend's bungalow. Though they have booked a new house for themselves, but they haven't got its possession yet. Riya works as an event manager in an event company while Rajesh works in a private bank as a Manager.

== Cast ==
- Smita Gondkar as Riya
- Rajendra Shisatkar as Rajesh
- Shilpa Khule Vaidya
- Ajay Aambekar
- Shekhar Hardikar

== Reception ==
A critic from The Times of India wrote that "With some fine tuning, 'Mr & Mrs Unwanted' might’ve worked but in its current state, the film is a tedious watch".

== Awards ==
- Best Jury Mention Film - (KIFF) Kalyan International Film Festival 2016
- Smita Gondkar -
  - Best Actress - (KIFF) Kalyan International Film Festival 2016
  - Won: Best Actress at the ALTFF 2017- Alternative Film Festival Spring 2017 Toronto)
- Best Social Film - (NIFF) Nashik International Film Festival 2016
