= Suryakant Lavande =

Indian cinematographer

- Born: Goa, Portuguese India
- Died: Dahisar, Maharashtra, India
- Occupations: Cinematographer; actor
- Notable work: Samna (1975); Gammat Jammat (1987)

Suryakant Lavande was an Indian cinematographer who worked primarily in Marathi cinema, occasionally in Hindi and Gujarati cinema. He received the V. Shantaram Lifetime Achievement Award from the Government of Maharashtra for his work in cinematography.

== Career ==
Lavande worked as a cinematographer on Marathi, Hindi and Gujarati films in a career spanning 60 years. He mainly worked under the direction of Sachin Pilgaonkar, Mahesh Kothare, and Jabbar Patel. He was the cinematographer of many films like Samna, Sinhasan, Navri Mile Navryala. He received many awards for his work, including the Maharashtra State Award for "Best Cinematographer" eight times and the Central Government Award once.

== Selected filmography ==
=== As Cinematographer ===
- Zapatlela
- De Danadan
- Samna
- Gammat Jammat
- Dhadakebaaz
- Majha Chakula
- Dhoom Dhadaka
- Thartharat
- Shame To Shame
- Pahila Bhau
- Yuge Yuge Mi Vat Pahili
- Sinhasan
- Lek Chalali Sasarla
- Bin Kamacha Navra
- Gadbad Ghotala

=== As an actor ===
De Danadan

== Death ==
He died in Dahisar, Mumbai at the age of 90.
