= Tapan Acharya =

Indian actor and filmmaker (born 1981)

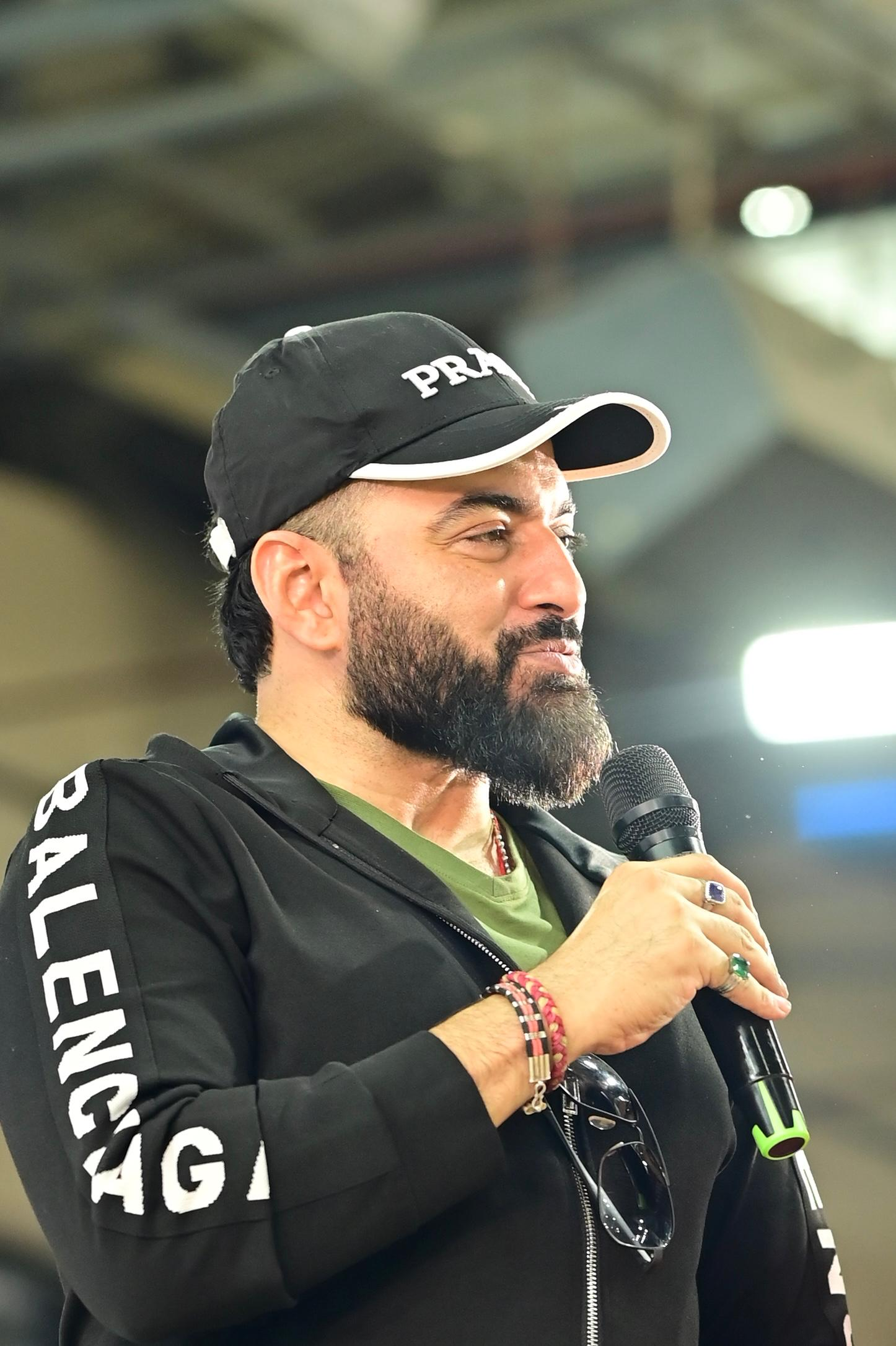
- Acharya in 2022
- Born: 2 August 1981 (age 44); Loliem-Polem, Goa, India
- Occupations: Actor, producer, television host
- Years active: 2000s–present
- Known for: Aleesha (2004); Naxalbari (2020)

Tapan Acharya (born 2 August 1981) is an Indian actor, filmmaker, writer, producer, and director known for his work in Marathi and Konkani films. He was appointed as a state youth icon by the Election Commission of India to promote voter awareness in Goa.

Acharya was elected as the president of the Goa Roll Ball Association in 2023 and has been serving as the president of the Roll Ball Federation of India since November 2023.

He also serves as President of Goa AVCG -XR Association which is working with industry professionals in gaming, animation and extended reality to implement AVGC -XR policy In Goa inline with Union policy which is notified by Modi Govt in Sept 2024.

== Early life and education ==
Tapan Acharya was born in a Goud Saraswat Brahmin family in the village Loliem-Polem, Goa. He attended school in his village at Shri Damodar Vidhalaya and pursued higher education at Shri Damodar College of Commerce and Economics, Margao. While pursuing a degree in law from G.R Kare Law College, he also completed a postgraduate diploma in management studies. He is credited with having knowledge in astrology, numerology, Vedas, and mythology. He holds various diplomas and certificates in gemology, astrology, and Vedic studies.

== Career ==
Although early in life he wanted to be behind the camera, he was first thrust into the public eye as host of the TV show Chum Chum Chanana on Doordarshan Goa. He went on to star in his first film, Aleesha, in 2004, which was released at First IFFI in Goa. It was well received, winning the National Award for Best Feature Film in the Regional Category.

He has directed more than 100 short film, ad film's and documentaries for Election Commission, Goa Police and many other corporate entities.

He is also part of Rowing and Sculling Association de Goa recognized by Rowing federation of Association.

== Filmography ==
Year	Title
2003	It's My Life
2004	Aleesha
2005	Padri
2009	Mareparyant Phashi
2017	Martin
2018	Planning Devachem
2020	Naxalbari (Web Series)
2023	Dil Dosti Deewangi

=== As a producer ===
- Janma (2011)
- Dil Dosti Deewangi (2023) as Co-producer

=== Television ===
- Chum Chum Chanana (DD Goa) (2001)

== Other work ==
Acharya was appointed as a youth icon for the state of Goa by the Election Commission of India to increase awareness in voters. He serves as president of Goa Roll Ball Association since June 2023, and also president of Roll Ball Federation of India since November 2023.
