= Madhu Kambikar =

Indian actress (1953–2026)

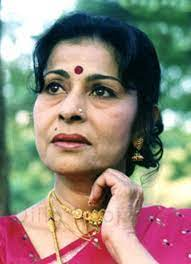
- Born: Madhu Vaman Jadhav; 28 July 1953; Gevrai, Beed, Hyderabad State, India
- Died: 12 October 2026 (aged 73); Pune, Maharashtra, India
- Occupations: Actress; folk dancer
- Years active: 1980–2016

Madhu Kambikar (28 July 1953 – 12 October 2026) was an Indian performing folk art artist, theatre actor, and film and TV personality, from Maharashtra. Kambikar went onto establish herself as one of the leading actresses of the 1980s. In a career spanning over four decades, she worked in over 75 films and received several accolades including a Filmfare Marathi Award and six Maharashtra State Film Awards.

== Background ==
Kambikar was born in Malegaon, a village in Gevrai, Beed district, on 28 July 1953, into the Kolhati community. She dropped out of school and would follow her father, also a performing artist, to shows. She became a performer at a very young age. She was the aunt of Kishor Shantabai Kale.

Although Madhu Kambikar was born in Malegaon, Beed district, she completed her primary education in Kambi village, Shevgaon taluka, Ahilyanagar district. Her stage name 'Kambikar' was derived from this village.

On 27 November 2016, she fell unconscious on stage during a lavani-tamasha performance at Yashwant Natya Mandir, Matunga and was hospitalised. She became bedridden after suffering a stroke in the hospital.

Kambikar died on 12 October 2026, at the age of 73.

== Folk and contemporary theatre ==
Kambikar acted in about a dozen folk plays, including:

- Dadu Indurikar's "Gadhavacha lagna"
- Shankar Patil's "Bhangadishivay pudhari nahi"
- Ashok Paranjape's "Ude ga Ambe ude"
- Vasant Sabnis' "Viccha mazi puri kara"
- Atmaram Sawant's "Mujra ghya sarkar"
- Ashok Patole/ Suyog's "Kashi me rahu tashich"
- Her own "Sakhi mazi lavani" directed by Upendra Limaye

She acted in 22–25 contemporary plays, including:

- Tumcha amcha sem asta
- Vastraharan
- Putrakameshti
- Paying guest
- Ajab nyaya vartulacha

== Filmography ==
Year	Title	Role	Notes
1977	Dagaa		
1980	Saubhagyadaan		
1980	Ranpakhare	Troop member	
1980	Devapudhe Manus		
1980	Hyoch Navra Pahije	Herself	Special appearance in the song "Aala Thandicha Mahina"
1981	Tamasgiri		
1981	Satichi Punyayee		
1982	Shapit	Bijli	
1982	Raghu Maina	Maina	
1984	Bin Kamacha Navra	Laxmi	
1984	Hech Majhe Maher	Sakhu	
1985	Devashappath Khara Sangen	Jaymala	
1986	Sutradhar		
1986	Aai Tuljabhavani	Tulja	
1986	Dhondi Dhondi Pani De	Radha	
1986	Aaj Jhale Mukt Mi	Kamal	
1987	Chal Re Lakshya Mumbaila	Herself	Special Appearance in the song “Navin Popat Ha”
1987	Stree Janma Hi Tujhi Kahani	Madhu	
1988	Mala Gheun Chala	Vanda	
1990	Rickshawali	Madam	
1991	Julum	Gajrabai	
1991	Pratikar	Rukmini	
1991	Mahima Jyotibacha	Savitri	
1992	Shola Aur Shabnam	Karan's mother	Hindi Movie
1992	Yeu Ka Gharat	Herself	Special appearance
1992	Ek Hota Vidushak	Manjula Devgaonkar	
1992	Jiwlagaa	Aai	
1992	Satwaan Asmaan	Mother	
1993	Zapatlela	Parubai Bolke	
1994	Mukta	Chandrabhaga Ghorpade	
1994	Kunku	Rakhma	
1994	Vishwavinayak	Tulsi	
1994	Majha Chakula	Sakhu	
1995	Doghi	Aunty	
1995	Hum Dono	Vishal's mother	
1996	Raosaheb	Raosaheb's wife	
1996	Jagannath	Mrs. Sinha	
1996	Ashi Asavi Sasu	Hausa	
1997	Yeshwant	Yashwant's mother	
1997	Paij Lagnachi	Pooja's mother	
1998	Shandhyug	Aai	
1998	Aali Laxmi Sasarla	Laxmi's mother-in-law	
1999	Nirmala Machindra Kamble	Rukmini Patil	
1999	Ghe Bharari	Mrs. Deshmukh	
2000	Tune Mera Dil Le Liya	Madhu	
2001	Sangharsh Jivnacha	Vijay & Ajay's mother	
2003	Bhaubeej	Dadima	
2004	Ranragini	Ragini's mother	
2005	Sawaal Majha Premacha	Sugandha Karadkar	
2005	Raja Pandharicha	Dnyaneshwar's grandma	
2007	Mumbaicha Dabewala	Namya's mother	
2007	Maherchi Maya	Mrs. Desai	
2007	Pathavni		
2007	Pisara		
2007	Karz Kunkwache		
2008	Sawar Re		
2008	Gondya Martay Tangada	Gondya's mother	
2008	Mahima Khandobacha	Mohini Kaminibai Pandharpurkar	
2008	Apradh	Aaisaheb	
2008	Mi Amruta Boltey	Amruta's mother	
2009	Rangiberangi		
2009	Gosht Choti Dongraewdhi		
2009	Houn Jau Dya		
2011	Durga Mhantyat Mala	Durga's mother	
2012	Mala Ek Chanace Hawa		
2012	Dusrya Jagatil	Mai	
2013	Zapatlela 2	Parubai Bolke	Sequel of Zapatlela
2015	Aabhraan	Saraswati	

== Accolades ==
- Hansa Wadkar Special Award for Best Actress
- Filmfare Award for Best Actress – Marathi for Shapit
- Maharashtra State Film Award for best actress for Shapit
- Maharashtra State Film Award for best actress for Hech Maze Maher
- Maharashtra State Film Award for Best Supporting Actress for film Raosahab.
- Nominated Filmfare Award for Best Actress – Marathi for film Raosahab.
- Maharashtra State Film Special Jury Award for film Aai Kulswamini Tulja Bhavani
- Maharashtra State Film Special Jury Award for film Sangharsh Jeevanacha
- Natvarya Keshavrao Date Puraskar
- Chairperson of the 2013 Mahila Lokakala Sammelan, Nagpur
- Lokashahir Patthe Bapurao Puraskar
- Maharshi Shankarrao Mohite-Patil Lavani Kalavant Puraskar 2007
- Zee Chitra Gaurav Life Time Achievement Award 2018
