= Majha Chakula =

- Theatrical release poster
- Directed by: Mahesh Kothare
- Written by: Story and Screenplay: Mahesh Kothare; Dialogue: Ashok Patole
- Produced by: Mahesh Kothare
- Starring: Adinath Kothare; Nivedita Joshi; Laxmikant Berde; Mahesh Kothare
- Cinematography: Suryakant Lavande
- Edited by: Vishwas Anil
- Music by: Anil Mohile
- Production company: Jenma Films International
- Release date: 18 October 1994
- Running time: 130 minutes
- Country: India
- Language: Marathi
- Box office: ₹5 crore

Majha Chakula ([maːd͡ʒʰa t͡ʃʰəkuːla]) is a 1994 Indian Marathi-language drama film directed by Mahesh Kothare. It stars Adinath Kothare (debut), Nivedita Joshi, Laxmikant Berde, Mahesh Kothare and Bipin Varti. The film was remade in Hindi as Masoom by same director.

== Plot ==
Young Adi's life changes completely when he comes to Mumbai with his mother, but ends up getting kidnapped. He manages to escape from the kidnappers but is all alone in the city.

== Cast ==
- Adinath Kothare as Adinath "Adi"
- Nivedita Joshi as Yashoda, Adi's mother
- Laxmikant Berde as Lakshya; a thief
- Mahesh Kothare as Inspector Mahesh Jadhav
- Bipin Varti as Gidhad; Main antagonist
- Vijay Chavan as Sakharam; Adinath's uncle and Yashoda's brother-in-law
- Pooja Pawar as Aavdi; Lakshya's love interest
- Hemangi Rao as Gauri Jadhav; Mahesh's wife
- Madhu Kambikar as Sakhu; Sakharam's wife and Yashoda's sister-in-law
- Ravindra Berde as Dholya; Aavdi's father
- Avinash Kharshikar as Parshya; Lakshya's friend
- Vijay Patkar as Bus Conductor

=== Supporting cast ===
- Udayraj Anekar
- Sangram Deshmukh
- Vilas Dighe
- Jayprakash Parulekar
- Ashok Mane
- Sachin Goswami

== Casting ==
Hemangi Rao was originally cast in a key role opposite Mahesh Kothare. However, during this period, Hemangi married Vinod Rao, and she also fell seriously ill. After shooting for a short time, she would fall ill again. As a result, Mahesh Kothare decided to reduce her role. Adinath Kothare, the son of Mahesh Kothare, made his debut as a child artist. Nivedita Saraf was eventually brought in as the lead actress despite Mahesh's wife Nilima's initial refusal.

== Awards ==
Year	Award	Category	Nominee	Result	Ref(s)
1994	Maharashtra State Film Award	Best Child Artist	Adinath Kothare	Won	
1994	Screen Awards	Best Director	Mahesh Kothare	Won	

== Soundtrack ==
=== Track listing ===
no.	Song	Singer	Lyrics
1	"Kiti Karashi Khodya Phar"	Lata Mangeshkar	Pravin Davane
2	"Mi Dombari Adani Maina, Karin Mumbaichya Raghujichi Daina"	Uttara Kelkar	Pravin Davane
3	"Aai Ye Na Aai"	Lata Mangeshkar	Pravin Davane
4	"Maza Chakula Maza Sonula"	Lata Mangeshkar	Pravin Davane
