= Faster Fene (series) =

Marathi book series by Bhaskar Ramachandra Bhagwat

- Author: Bhaskar Ramachandra Bhagwat
- Country: India
- Language: Marathi
- Discipline: Mystery, Detective, Thriller, Adventure
- Publisher: Popular Prakashan (1974); Utkarsh Prakashan (1975 onwards)
- Published: 1974
- Media type: Print
- No. of books: 20

Faster Fene is a series of Marathi books and novels written by Marathi author Bhaskar Ramachandra Bhagwat popularly known as Bha.Ra. Bhagwat. This series chronicles the life of an adventurous boy, Banesh Fene, who seems to get embroiled in various mysteries, secrets, dramas, adventures and even Indo-China war of 1962. There are twenty books and novels in the Faster Fene series, with the first being Fursungicha Faster Fene.

The first book of Faster Fene series was published in the year 1974 by Pune-based Popular Prakashan. But a year later, another Pune-based publisher Utkarsh Prakashan acquired the rights to publish Faster Fene books.

He is known to be one of the most popular detective characters of Maharashtra and these Faster Fene novels have been translated into other languages such as English and Hindi.

== Summary ==
Banesh Fene is a lanky school-going teenager who is always ready for adventures wherever he goes. He is a student of Vidya Bhavan School in Pune. He was born in a village called Fursungi near Pune. He is very agile and is very fast with his feet and on his bicycle. Hence he earns his nickname 'Faster Fene'.

Most of Faster Fene's adventures are based in and around Pune. However, in some books and novels his adventures take place in Jammu and Kashmir, near Indo-China border and even in Afghanistan. According to Faster Fene, although he doesn't wish to get into trouble, mysteries and adventures follow him wherever he goes and so he is left with no option but to fight back and solve mysteries.

== Novels ==
1. फुरसुंगीचा फास्टर फेणे (Fursungicha Faster Fene)
2. आगे बढो...फास्टर फेणे (Aage Badho Faster Fene)
3. बालबहाद्दर फास्टर फेणे (Balbahaddar Faster Fene)
4. जवानमर्द फास्टर फेणे (Jawanmard Faster Fene)
5. फास्टर फेणेचा रणरंग (Faster Fenecha Ranrang)
6. ट्रिंग ट्रिंग फास्टर फेणे (Tring..Tring..Faster Fene)
7. फास्टर फेणेची एक्स्प्रेस कामगिरी (Faster Fenechi Express Kamgiri)
8. फास्टर फेणे टोला हाणतो (Faster Fene Tola Hanato)
9. फास्टर फेणे डिटेक्टिव्ह (Faster Fene Detective)
10. फास्टर फेणेची काश्मिरी करामत (Faster Fenechi Kashmiri Karamat)
11. प्रतापगडावर फास्टर फेणे (Pratapgadavar Faster Fene)
12. गुलमर्गचे गूढ आणि फास्टर फेणे (Gulmargche Gudh Ani Faster Fene)
13. चिंकूचे चाळे आणि फास्टर फेणे (Chinkuche Chale Ani Faster Fene)
14. फास्टर फेणेची डोंगर-भेट (Faster Fenechi Dongar Bhet)
15. फास्टर फेणेच्या गळ्यात माळ (Faster Fenechya Galyat Mal)
16. चक्री वादळात फास्टर फेणे (Chakri Vadlat Faster Fene)
17. चिंकू चिंपांझी आणि फास्टर फेणे (Chinku Chimpanzee Ani Faster Fene)
18. विमान-चोर विरुद्ध फास्टर फेणे (Viman-Chor Viruddha Faster Fene)
19. जंगलपटात फास्टर फेणे (Junglepatat Faster Fene)
20. टिक टाॅक फास्टर फेणे (Tick Tock Faster Fene)

== Films adaptation ==
In 2017, the character of Faster Fene was adapted into an on-screen character for a Marathi movie Faster Fene, directed by Aditya Sarpotdar and produced by Riteish Deshmukh. The character of Faster Fene was played by Amey Wagh.
