= Leelawati Bhaskar Bhagwat =

Indian writer and editor (1922-2013)

- Born: 1920; India
- Died: 26 November 2013 (aged 92–93)
- Known for: Children's Literature
- Spouses: Bhaskar Ramachandra Bhagwat

Leelawati Bhaskar Bhagwat (Marathi: लीलावती भास्कर भागवत) was an editor and author of Marathi children's books.
