= Ramchandra Purushottam Joshi =

- Promotional poster
- Directed by: Ajay Phansekar
- Starring: Dilip Prabhavalkar; Rajan Tamhane; Suhas Joshi; Deepak Shirke
- Cinematography: B. Laxman
- Release date: 4 October 2013
- Country: India
- Language: Marathi

Ramchandra Purushottam Joshi is a 2013 Marathi-language fantasy comedy drama film directed by Ajay Phansekar. The film stars Dilip Prabhavalkar, Suhas Joshi, Rajan Tamhane, Deepak Shirke, and Sheetal Kshirsagar. The film was released on 4 October 2013.

== Cast ==
- Dilip Prabhavalkar as Ramchandra Purushottam Joshi (Ra. Pu. Jo.)
- Suhas Joshi as Janaki Ramchandra Joshi
- Rajan Tamhane as Yamaraj
- Deepak Shirke as Ugrakesh
- Sheetal Kshirsagar as Sandhya Ramchandra Joshi
- Vikas Kadam as Ninad Ramchandra Joshi
- Milind Wagh as Nishikant Ramchandra Joshi (Nishi)
- Preeti Joshi as Poonam Nishikant Joshi
- Medha Gokhale as Poonam's mother
- Manoj Khalatkar

== Reception ==
Saumitra Pote from Maharashtra Times wrote "Today, bringing together the worlds of fantasy and real life has given them some exercise. But, the movie keeps the audience hooked". Amol Parchure from News18 Lokmat opined, "Overall, this Rapujo can be described as decorated in acting but bogged down in setting". Jaikrishna from Prahaar stated "However, these special scenes in this film are very well done. He should be congratulated. If you like to watch a different story then there is no problem to watch this movie". A reviewer of Divya Marathi said "The movie is sure to make fans think about the question, if only for a moment, but for some life-long decisions, if your parents and ancestors suddenly reveal themselves for a few hours. There are no songs in this movie. But the fictional story has given a message of caution to man while living".
