= A Dot Com Mom =

- Directed by: Meena Nerurkar
- Screenplay by: Meena Nerurkar
- Story by: Meena Nerurkar
- Produced by: Meena Nerurkar
- Starring: Vikram Gokhale; Meena Nerurkar; Vijay Chavan; Apurva Bhalerao; Sai Gundewar; Asha Shelar; Dipti Lele; Shriram Kolhatkar; Deven Gabale; Makarand Bhave; Manasi Karandikar; Seeyali Singh; Dawn Scott; Carrie Sullivan; Rafael Dieppa; Prashant Tapasvi
- Edited by: Sunil Jadhav
- Music by: Ashok Patki; Pratik Shah; Neel Nadkarni
- Release date: 30 September 2016
- Country: India
- Language: Marathi

A Dot Com Mom is a 2016 Indian Marathi language family drama film. It is directed by Meena Nerurkar, who also stars in the film with Vikram Gokhale, Vijay Chavan, Apurva Bhalerao, and Sai Gundewar. The movie was released in India in September 2016.

The movie is the first Marathi film to be filmed in the United States.

== Synopsis ==
Sulbhatai, a struggling, middle-class mother from a small town in Maharashtra, India, works hard to raise her highly intelligent son, Sunil, who eventually moves to the United States and becomes a successful millionaire through his website. He invites his parents to visit him, but only his mother manages to come. Her son is excited and wants to show her around, but she cannot cope with the more modern culture of the United States. Sunil's wife, Seema, cannot bear her mother-in-law's presence in her house, so Sulbhatai decides to go back to India early. Months later, Sunil wants his mother to return to the United States. She is reluctant, but her husband insists that she return to help during Seema's labor. Having prepared for two months, Sulbhatai returns to the United States.

== Starring ==
- Vikram Gokhale
- Meena Nerurkar as Sulba Chafekar
- Vijay Chavan
- Apurva Bhalerao
- Sai Gundewar
- Asha Shelar
- Dipti Lele
- Shriram Kolhatkar
- Deven Gabale
- Makarand Bhave
- Manasi Karandikar
- Seeyali Singh
- Dawn Scott
- Carrie Sullivan
- Rafael E. Dieppa
- Prashant Tapasvi
- Sanyogita Apte

== Crew ==
Crew	Names
Production Companies	Kayan Productions in association with Kalabhavan USA
Director, Story, Screenplay, and Dialogue	Meena Nerurkar
Producer	Meena Nerurkar
Music Directors	Sudhir Phadke, Ashok Patki - Neel Nadkarni, Pratik Shah
Lyrics by	Jagdish Khebudkar, Neel Nadkarni, Meena Nerurkar
Choreography	Meena Nerurkar
Singers	Devaki Pandi, Suresh Wadkar, Vinay Mandke, Neel Nadkarni, Nida, Neelaja Ankrom
Executive Producers	Jitendra Kulkarni ( INDIA ), Rahul Bodas (INDIA), Sanjay Shetye (USA)
Associate Director	Sandeep Patil
Editor	Sunil Jadhav
DI Colorist	Kiran @ Prasad Labs
Sound Recordist	Sandeep Raool
Sound Studio	Aradhana Sound Studio
VFX Effects	Piyush Khandelwal
Line Producer	Raashi Desai
Production Manager	Tejoo Bambulkar
Art Direction	Tejoo Bambulkar, Sunita Phatak (USA)
