= Naxalbari (TV series) =

Indian web series

- Written by: Pulkit Rishi; Prakhar Vihaan; Pradip Atluri
- Directed by: Partho Mitra
- Starring: Rajeev Khandelwal; Tina Datta; Satyadeep Mishra; Sreejita De; Narayani Shastri; Shakti Anand; Aamir Ali; Tapan Acharya
- Country of origin: India
- Original language: Hindi
- No. of seasons: 1
- No. of episodes: 9

Production
- Producers: Arjun Singgh Baran; Kartk D Nishandar
- Production location: India
- Cinematography: Hari Nair
- Production companies: Global Sports Entertainment; Media Solutions Pvt Ltd (GSEAMS)

Original release
- Network: ZEE5
- Release: 28 November 2020

Naxalbari is a crime thriller web series directed by Partho Mitra. Produced by Arjun Singh Baran and Kartik D. Nishandar, it revolves around an STF agent who goes on a mission to suppress the revival of a Naxal uprising in Gadchiroli. The series stars Rajeev Khandelwal, Tina Datta and Aamir Ali. It premiered on 28 November 2020 on ZEE5.

== Plot ==
The story is set in Maharashtra, and revolves around an STF agent who goes on a secret mission to uncover the truth behind a Naxal uprising in his village, Gadchiroli.

== Cast ==
- Rajeev Khandelwal as Raghav
- Tina Datta as Ketki Maheshwari
- Satyadeep Mishra as Pahan
- Narayani Shastri as Sudha
- Shakti Anand as Binu
- Aamir Ali as Keswani
- Tapan Acharya as Narsing Chandel
- Sreejita De as Prakruti

== Episodes ==
No.	Title	Directed by	Written by	Original release date
1	"The Gadchiroli Blast"	Partho Mitra	Pulkit Rishi & Prakhar Vihaan	November 28, 2020
2	"The Stake Out"	Partho Mitra	Pulkit Rishi & Prakhar Vihaan	November 28, 2020
3	"Shanghaied"	Partho Mitra	Pulkit Rishi & Prakhar Vihaan	November 28, 2020
4	"The Demons Of The past"	Partho Mitra	Pulkit Rishi & Prakhar Vihaan	November 28, 2020
5	"FICA"	Partho Mitra	Pulkit Rishi & Prakhar Vihaan	November 28, 2020
6	"The Turning Point"	Partho Mitra	Pulkit Rishi & Prakhar Vihaan	November 28, 2020
7	"No Turning Back"	Partho Mitra	Pulkit Rishi & Prakhar Vihaan	November 28, 2020
8	"Mayhem"	Partho Mitra	Pulkit Rishi & Prakhar Vihaan	November 28, 2020
9	"Thok Ke Badla"	Partho Mitra	Pulkit Rishi & Prakhar Vihaan	November 28, 2020

== Release ==
In June 2020, ZEE5 announced that the show would begin reshooting with proper safety measures. The web series was released on 28 November 2020 on the platform.

== Reception ==
News18 rated the series 2.5 out of 5 and stated: "Web series director Partho Mitra has made a decent show with the script at hand and considering the run-time of episodes is limited to under thirty minutes each, it does not slack off either and holds attention with various twists and sincere performances backing the teleplay."

Archika Khurana from Times Of India rated the series 3.5 out of 5 and praised Rajeev Khandelwal’s performance. "He has given one of his best performances as STF agent Raghav. He managed to bring intensity and gravitas to his character, especially when he follows the trail of the Naxals."
