= Hai Tujhe Salaam India =

Film by Avanish Kumar (2022)

- Promotional release poster
- Directed by: Avanish Kumar
- Written by: Avanish Kumar
- Produced by: Arbaaz Bhatt
- Starring: Aarya Babbar; Ajaz Khan; Smita Gondkar; Kanwalpreet Singh; Salman Bhatt
- Cinematography: Harish Patel
- Edited by: Santosh Mandal
- Music by: Sagar Bhatia; Yug Bhusal
- Production company: Redwood Productions
- Release date: 26 January 2022
- Country: India
- Language: Hindi

Hai Tujhe Salaam India is a 2022 Indian Hindi-language political drama film written and directed by Avanish Kumar and produced by Arbaaz Bhatt under the banner Redwood Productions. It features Aarya Babbar, Ajaz Khan, and Smita Gondkar. The film was released digitally on Hungama Play on 26 January 2022.

== Cast ==
- Aarya Babbar as Raquib
- Ajaz Khan as Goivinda
- Smita Gondkar as Zoya
- Salman Bhatt as David
- Kanwalpreet Singh as Happy
- Archana Prajapati as Archana
- Nishikant Dixit as Narang
- Gulshan Pandey as Janardhan
- Mir Sarwar as Pradhan
- Mushtaq Khan as Raman Ojha
- Mir Umar as Vicky
- Banwari Lal Jhol Shukla ji
- Javed Rizvi as Aafat
- Deepak Sharma as Major Arun

== Production ==
The shooting started in the spring of 2017. Some of the material was filmed at Indira Gandhi Memorial Tulip Garden. The main drama portion of the film was shot in Mumbai at various studios.

== Music ==
=== Track listing ===
No.	Title	Lyrics	Music	Singer(s)	Length
1.	"Khamosiyan"	Sagar Bhatia; Dharmendra Ehsas	Sagar Bhatia	Darshan Raval	3:35
2.	"Vande Matram"	Yug Bhusal	Yug Bhusal	Kailash Kher	2:50
3.	"Beauty Pe Sity"	Sagar Bhatia	Sagar Bhatia	Divya Kumar (singer); Shivani Bhatt	3:59
