= Shapit =

- Theatrical release poster
- Directed by: Rajdutt; Arvind Deshpande
- Screenplay by: G.R. Kamat
- Story by: Snehal Dasnurkar
- Produced by: Madhukar Rupji; Sudha Chitale; Vinay Newalkar
- Starring: Madhu Kambikar; Kuldeep Pawar; Nilu Phule; Yashwant Dutt
- Music by: Sudhir Phadke
- Release date: 30 December 1982
- Country: India
- Language: Marathi

Shapit (transl. Cursed) is a Marathi-language film was released on 30 December 1982. It is produced by Madhukar Rupji, Sudha Chitale, Vinay Newalkar under the banner of Troyka Films Combine and directed by Rajdutt & Arvind Deshpande. The film won President's silver medal for Best Feature Film in Marathi at the National Film Awards.

== Plot ==
Shapit is a movie about how some people have money and power while others don't. It shows how the rich often treat the poor and people from lower castes unfairly, making their lives harder. The movie depicts how the differences in social status and money affect everyday life. It's a reminder that the world isn't always fair, and some people have opportunities just because they were born into wealth or a higher caste. The movie shines a light on these inequalities and makes us think about how we can make things more equal.

== Cast ==
- Madhu Kambikar as Bijli
- Yashwant Dutt as Bali
- Nilu Phule as Rangya; Bijli's father
- Kuldeep Pawar as Raosaheb Inamdar
- Shahaji Kale as Shrimant Inamdar; Raosaheb's Father
- Meena Naik as Raosaheb's wife
- Suhas Bhalekar as Sarja
- Suhas Mastakar as Birja
- Ashutosh Gowariker
- Mangala Sansgiri
- Vanamali Nivaskar

== Soundtrack ==
The music has been directed by Sudhir Phadke and all lyrics were written by Sudhir Moghe.

=== Track listing ===
- "Dis Jatil Dis Yetil" (Lyricist(s): Sudhir Moghe) - Suresh Wadkar, Asha Bhosle
- "Dola Asun Baghana" - Asha Bhosle
- "Man Majha Bhulala Bai" - Asha Bhosle

== Awards ==
30th National Film Awards

- National Film Award for Best Feature Film in Marathi

Maharashtra State Film Awards

- Maharashtra State Film Award for Best Film
- Maharashtra State Film Award for Best Actress for Madhu Kambikar
- Maharashtra State Film Award for Best Director for Rajdutt & Arvind Deshpande
- Maharashtra State Film Award for Best Female Playback Singer for Asha Bhosle
- Maharashtra State Film Award for Best Male Playback Singer for Suresh Wadkar

Filmfare Awards Marathi

- Filmfare Award for Best Film — Marathi
- Filmfare Award for Best Actress — Marathi for Madhu Kambikar
- Filmfare Award for Best Director — Marathi for Rajdutt & Arvind Deshpande
- Filmfare Award for Best Actor — Marathi for Yashwant Dutt
