= Dil Dosti Deewangi =

- Directed by: Shirish Rane
- Written by: Deepak Tarkar
- Produced by: Rajendra Rajan
- Starring: Smita Gondkar; Chirag Patil; Kashyap Parulekar; Veena Jagtap
- Cinematography: Dhananjay Kulkarni
- Edited by: Amol Khanvilkar
- Music by: Sonali Uday
- Production companies: Translndia Media & Entertainment
- Distributed by: Filmastra Studios
- Release date: 13 October 2023
- Country: India
- Language: Marathi

Dil Dosti Deewangi is a 2023 Indian Marathi-language romantic drama film directed by Shirish Rane, written by Deepak Tarkar and produced by Rajendra Rajan. The film starring Smita Gondkar, Chirag Patil, Veena Jagtap, and Kashyap Parulekar in leading roles. The music is composed by Sonali Uday, while the songs are sung by Avadhoot Gupte, Vaishali Samant, and Sonali Patel.

== Cast ==
- Smita Gondkar as Riya
- Chirag Patil as Rahul
- Kashyap Parulekar as Aditya
- Veena Jagtap as Shriya
- Vidyadhar Joshi as Michael Brigenza
- Tapan Acharya as Pratik
- Surekha Kudachi as Catholic Miss Mary
- Pradeep Velankar
- Smita Jaykar
- Vijay Patkar
- Akshada Patel
- Atul Kawthalkar as Vicky
- Tirtha Murbadkar as Sonali
- Durva Salokhe as Roshani
- Kanwalpreet Singh as Pappu Sardar

== Release ==
The film was theatrically released on 13 October 2023. Previously it was set to release on 6 October 2023.

== Reception ==
Jaydeep Pathakjee of Maharashtra Times rated 2.5 stars out of 5 stars and called it an average film. Film Information was of the opinion that the direction, music, and dialogue were average, while for the story and screenplay it wrote "childish story and an equally kiddish screenplay".

== Music ==
The music is composed by Sonali Uday and songs are sung by Avadhoot Gupte, Vaishali Samant and Sonali Patel.
