= Zapatlela =

- VCD cover art
- Directed by: Mahesh Kothare
- Story by: Mahesh Kothare
- Based on: Child's Play by Don Mancini
- Produced by: Mahesh Kothare
- Starring: Mahesh Kothare; Laxmikant Berde; Kishori Ambiye; Pooja Pawar; Madhu Kambikar; Ravindra Berde; Jairam Kulkarni; Vijay Chavan; Raghavendra Kadkol; Bipin Varti; Dilip Prabhavalkar
- Cinematography: Suryakant Lavande
- Edited by: Vishwas–Anil
- Music by: Anil Mohile
- Production company: Jenma Films International
- Distributed by: Adinath Film Distributors
- Release date: 16 April 1993 (Maharashtra)
- Running time: 149 minutes
- Country: India
- Language: Marathi
- Budget: 40 Lakh
- Box office: est.₹5 crore

Zapatlela (transl. Possessed) is a 1993 Indian Marathi-language horror comedy film directed and produced by Mahesh Kothare under Jenma Films International. The film stars an ensemble cast of Mahesh Kothare, Laxmikant Berde, Pooja Pawar, Kishori Ambiye, Madhu Kambikar, Jairam Kulkarni, Vijay Chavan, Ravindra Berde, Raghavendra Kadkol, Bipin Varti, and Dilip Prabhavalkar made a cameo appearance and provided the voiceover for the puppet Tatya Vinchu in the film. The practical effects for the puppet were created by Ramdas Padhye, a renowned ventriloquist and puppeteer. A sequel titled Zapatlela 2 was released 20 years later in 2013 in 3D format.

Over the time the film achieved cult following in Marathi audience.

== Plot ==
The film begins on a dark night with the car of a notorious crime lord, Tatya Vinchu, and his sidekick, Kubdya Khavis, approaching the cave of a magician named Baba Chamatkar in Mumbai. Tatya Vinchu threatens Baba Chamatkar for the "Mrityunjay Mantra", a voodoo spell that can transfer the chanter's soul into any living or non-living object, and Baba Chamatkar unwillingly provides Tatya Vinchu the mantra out of fear. Soon after, CID Inspector Mahesh Jadhav, who has been working on his mission to capture Tatya Vinchu, raids his warehouse and pursues him until Tatya Vinchu and Kubdya Khavis hide in a nearby post office. At the post office, Mahesh gets into a combat with Kubdya Khavis and ends up shooting Tatya Vinchu fatally in the chest in encounter. With the last breath, Tatya Vinchu discovers the parcel of a ventriloquist's puppet lying on the floor in the post office, and uses the mantra provided by Baba Chamatkar to enable his soul to possess the puppet. Meanwhile, Mahesh arrests Kubdya Khavis for his crimes and believes that Tatya Vinchu is finally dead.

A few days later, Mahesh's employer, Superintendent Jairam Ghatge, gets transferred to the village of Shrirangpur, Maharashtra and at the same time, his young daughter, Gauri, arrives in India from the USA to pursue doctor of philosophy in criminal psychology. Gauri meets her younger brother, Laxmikant Bolke, also known as Lakshya, who lives with his widowed mother, Parubai, in Shrirangpur and is a shopkeeper. Lakshya is also in a relationship with Aavdi, the daughter of Constable Tukaram, who has fixed her marriage with Constable Sakharam against her wishes. Due to his fondness for ventriloquism, Gauri sends Lakshya a puppet from the USA through courier but unfortunately, the puppet turns out to be the same one which is possessed by Tatya Vinchu. The puppet reveals himself to be Tatya Vinchu to Lakshya, who, however, believes it to be containing an audio tape recorder for the puppet being imported.

Later, Lakshya and Parubai's landlord, Dhanajirao Dhanavte, is offended after being publicly insulted by Lakshya via puppetry. Under the pretext of unpaid rent, Dhanajirao has all the furniture in Lakshya and Parubai's house (including the puppet of Tatya Vinchu) confiscated and stored in his warehouse. Shocked at learning this, Lakshya decides to teach Dhanajirao a lesson and angrily storms off to his warehouse. Meanwhile, Tatya Vinchu reveals his identity to Dhanajirao in the warehouse and threatens to kill him with a sickle, causing a horrified Dhanajirao to die of heart failure. In the moments immediately after Dhanajirao's death, Lakshya reaches the warehouse and is shocked to discover Dhanajirao dead, realising that the puppet of Tatya Vinchu is indeed a living thing. Just then, Mahesh too arrives at the scene with Gauri and the police, and arrests Lakshya for believing him to have committed Dhanajirao's murder in a fit of rage. In prison, Lakshya desperately tries to explain that the culprit is Tatya Vinchu, not him, but Mahesh refuses to believe him and considers him to be mentally ill. The next day, however, Dhanajirao's postmortem reports prove Lakshya innocent and he is released from prison by Mahesh.

Meanwhile, the puppet of Tatya Vinchu travels to Mumbai and meets with Baba Chamatkar, demanding him to explain to him how to migrate into a human form. Baba Chamatkar initially refuses to do so, but when Tatya Vinchu threatens to kill him, Baba Chamatkar explains to him that he must transfer his soul into the human body of the person whom he has confessed his identity first and that person is Lakshya. On learning this, Tatya Vinchu returns to Shrirangpur during the festival of Holi with the intention of possess Lakshya's body. One night, Tatya Vinchu enters Lakshya's house through the window and tries to chant the mantra on him, but Lakshya manages to lock him up inside the closet. The next morning, Aavdi takes the puppet of Tatya Vinchu out from the closet and buries it underground, but Tatya Vinchu succeeds in coming out by digging from inside, much to Lakshya's fear. Tukaram and Sakharam believe Lakshya to be mentally unstable and forcefully take him into a mental hospital in Shrirangpur.

That night, Gauri takes the puppet of Tatya Vinchu to her house when Tatya Vinchu reveals his true identity and attacks Gauri, who manages to escape from him, horrified, and meets Mahesh to inform him the reality about Tatya Vinchu. Having received the whereabouts of Baba Chamatkar's cave, Mahesh and Gauri arrive and confront Baba Chamatkar, who reveals that the only way to kill Tatya Vinchu is to shoot him right between his two eyebrows. Meanwhile, Tatya Vinchu tries to enter the mental hospital through the window to reach out to Lakshya, scaring Lakshya enough to escape from the mental hospital back to his house in the middle of the night. Tatya Vinchu then meets Kubdya Khavis, who has escaped from prison, and the two barge into Lakshya's house and capture him and Parubai. However, Mahesh arrives at the scene with Gauri on time and frees Lakshya and Parubai from the clutches of Tatya Vinchu and Kubdya Khavis.

In the ensuing fight, Tatya Vinchu pursues Lakshya up to the roof to possess his body. Mahesh injures Kubdya Khavis and reaches up to the roof, but Tatya Vinchu nearly drops Mahesh down the roof, leaving him hanging on its edge, and begins chanting the mantra on Lakshya. Just as Tatya Vinchu is about to utter the last verse, Mahesh manages to get back on the roof and uses his gun to shoot Tatya Vinchu right between his two eyebrows. The puppet falls down the roof, now lifeless, and the police arrest Kubdya Khavis once again. Finally, Tukaram and Jairam also agree for Lakshya and Mahesh's marriages with Aavdi and Gauri, respectively. The film ends with a renowned ventriloquist and puppeteer, Ramdas Padhye, presenting Lakshya a new puppet as a bravery award, and Lakshya screaming at Mahesh due to his fear of puppets since the incident of Tatya Vinchu.

== Cast ==
- Mahesh Kothare as CID Inspector Mahesh Jadhav
- Laxmikant Berde as Laxmikant Bolke (a.k.a. Lakshya)
- Kishori Ambiye as Gauri Ghatge
- Pooja Pawar as Aavdi
- Madhu Kambikar as Parubai Bolke (Lakshya's mother)
- Ravindra Berde as Constable Tukaram (Aavdi's father)
- Jairam Kulkarni as Superintendent Jairam Ghatge (Gauri's father)
- Vijay Chavan as Constable Sakharam (Aavdi's prospective bridegroom)
- Raghavendra Kadkol as Baba Chamatkar (Tatya Vinchu's wizard)
- Bipin Varti as Kubdya Khavis (Tatya Vinchu's sidekick)
- Dilip Prabhavalkar in a cameo appearance as Tatya Vinchu (voiceover also)
- Dinkar Inamdar as Dhanajirao Dhanavte (Lakshya and Parubai's landlord)
- Ramdas Padhye in a cameo appearance as himself in the ending scene

== Production ==
=== Inspiration ===
This film was inspired from the 1988 Hollywood movie Child's Play, a film by Don Macini. It was a horror film. As in Zapatlela, it opens with a serial killer (Charles Lee Ray) transferring his soul into a doll, Chucky after being shot by a police officer, and is given to a child, Andy Barclay, who is not believed to when he claims that the doll is alive. Chucky goes to meet his old voodoo master John in a similar manner Tatya Vinchu confronts Baba Chamatkar and learns that the only way to become human again is transferring his soul into the body of the first person he told his true name to, who happens to be Andy, which puts him in the same danger Lakshya is subjected to by the living doll. Tatya is also shot dead by the same police officer that originally killed his human self after the cop was instructed by John that Chucky's weakness is his heart, just like how Baba does by telling Mahesh to shoot Tatya between his eyebrows to kill him.

=== Development and casting ===
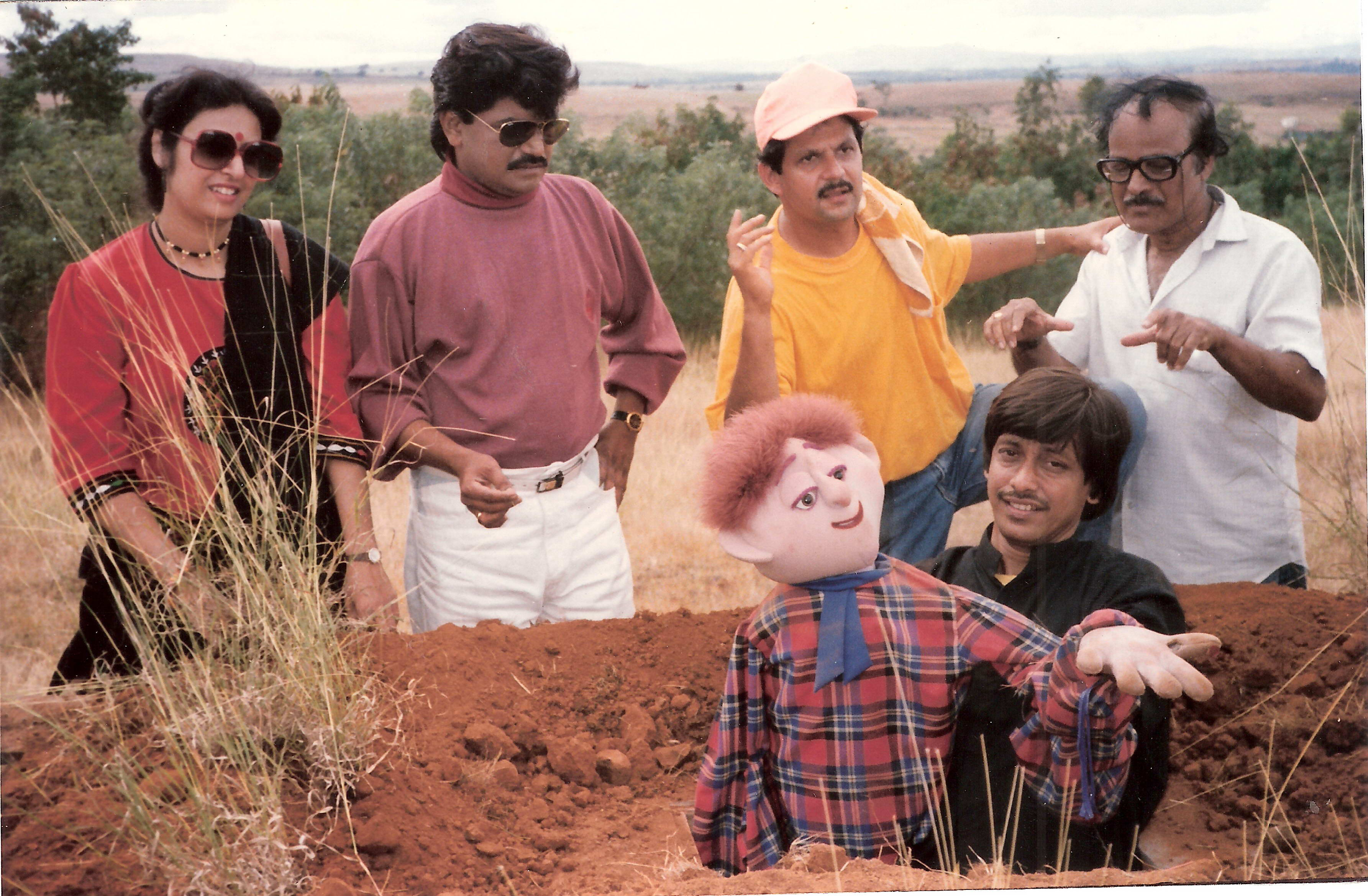

Mahesh Kothare said he wrote the story of Zapatlela in a hotel room in a week. Name of the main antagonist, notorious criminal Tatya Vinchu, Kothare developed from the amalgamation of his make-up man's name 'Tatya' and 'Red Scorpion', which he had seen in his childhood. The evil puppet Tatya Vinchu and Lakshya's naughtiest puppet Ardhavatrao are both created and operated by Ramdas Padhye, a ventriloquist. The voice of Ardhvatrao was dubbed by Ramdas Padhye. Dilip Prabhavalkar performed the voiceover for Tatya Vinchu puppet.

Laxmikant Berde signed in the lead role, making his fifth collaboration with Mahesh Kothare. Kothare wrote the role of Gauri with Nivedita Joshi-Saraf in mind, but turned down the offer due to she got married and the offer went to Kishori Ambiye. Priya Arun was the first choice for the role of Aavdi but she also turned down and the offer went to Pooja Pawar. Dilip Prabhavalkar made a cameo appearance in the role of Tatya Vinchu, the antagonist in the film.

== Soundtrack ==
Zapatlela

Soundtrack album by Anil Mohile
- Released: 1985
- Genre: Feature film soundtrack
- Language: Marathi

The music is composed by Anil Mohile

Track listing
No.	Title	Singer (s)	Length
1.	"Zapatlela"	Sudesh Bhosle, Uttara Kelkar
2.	"Tujhya Majhya Premachi Godi"	Suresh Wadkar, Sadhana Sargam
3.	"Dhak Dhak Manat Zalay Suru"	Vinay Mandke, Uttara Kelkar
4.	"Zap Zap Zapatlela"	Sudesh Bhosle, Sadhana Sargam, Vinod Rathod

== Sequel ==
A sequel to the film, titled Zapatlela 2, was released in 3D on 7 June 2013 with Adinath Kothare and Sonalee Kulkarni in the lead roles. It also features Makarand Anaspure, Sai Tamhankar, Mahesh Kothare, Madhu Kambikar and Vishakha Subhedar in supporting roles. This film got mediocre success. Mahesh Kothare declared his intentions to create "Zapatlela 3" in 2017. Then, in 2024, he reiterated the announcement, revealing plans for a theatrical release in 2025.

== Reception ==
After theatrical release, Zapatlela became All Time Blockbuster and it is a popular film in Maharashtra.

== Remakes ==
The film was remade in Telugu in the year 2001, with the title Ammo Bomma, with Rajendra Prasad playing the lead role.
