= Archana Prajapati =

Indian actor (b. 1996)

- Born: 1996 or 1997 (age 29–30); Mumbai, Maharashtra, India
- Occupations: Actress, model
- Years active: 2016–present
- Works: Hai Tujhe Salaam India

Archana Prajapati is an Indian actress and model. She has established a successful career in Bhojpuri cinema, but has also appeared in Hindi films. She was born and raised in Mumbai, Maharashtra, and debuted in Bhojpuri cinema in 2017 with the film Ziddi.

== Early life and education ==
Archana Prajapati was born in Mumbai, Maharashtra, in financial humble family. She completed her education from Mumbai University and later pursued her acting career.

== Career ==
Prajapati made her film debut in 2017 with the film Ziddi. Her next Hindi film was Nathuniya Pe Goli Mare 2, in which she played a reporter alongside Vikrant Singh Rajpoot and Antara Biswas.

== Filmography ==
Films

Key
†	Denotes films that have not yet been released

Year	Film	Role	Notes
2022	Hai Tujhe Salaam India	Archana	Bollywood debut
2017	Ziddi	Soniya	Bhojpuri debut
2017	Nathuniya Pe Goli Mare 2	Reporter	
2017	Ghaat	Radha	
2018	Sakhi Ke Biyah	Pinky	
	Meri Jaan Tiranga†	TBA	
	Kahani Kismat Ki†	TBA	
	Cottage No 1303†	TBA	

Music Video

Year	Title	as	ref
2021	Mohabbat Barbad	Actress	
2022	Ishq Musafir	Actress	

== See also ==
- List of Bhojpuri cinema actresses
