= Ammo Bomma =

2001 film by Relangi Narasimha Rao

- VCD cover
- Directed by: Relangi Narasimha Rao
- Written by: Ramesh-Gopi (dialogues)
- Screenplay by: Relangi Narasimha Rao
- Story by: Mahesh Kothare
- Based on: Zapatlela (1993)
- Produced by: D. Lata Mahesh
- Starring: Rajendra Prasad; Suman; Seema; Uma
- Cinematography: Shankar
- Edited by: B. Krishnam Raju
- Music by: Shanmuk
- Production company: Sirisha Productions
- Release date: 4 May 2001
- Running time: 141 mins
- Country: India
- Language: Telugu

Ammo Bomma (transl. My God! Doll!) is a 2001 Indian Telugu-language horror comedy film directed by Relangi Narasimha Rao. It stars Rajendra Prasad, Suman, Seema, Uma and the music is composed by Shanmuk. The film is a remake of the Marathi movie Zapatlela (1993) which itself was inspired by 1988 Hollywood film Child's Play. The film was an average grosser at the box office.

In the film, a haunted doll is possessed by the spirit of a recently deceased gangster. The doll starts killing people, while trying to gain a new human form. A ventriloquist is blamed for the murders and arrested.

== Cast ==
- Rajendra Prasad as Rambabu
- Suman as Mahesh
- Seema as Sowmya
- Uma as Lakshmi
- Satya Prakash as Gangaram
- Sudhakar as Constable Cola
- Tanikella Bharani as Janardhan Seth
- Annapurna as Parvatamma
- M. S. Narayana as Principal
- Mallikarjuna Rao as Constable Nukkaraju
- Maganthi Sudhakar as S.P.
- Tirupathi Prakash
- KK Sarma
- Sattibabu
- Jeeva as Deva
- Jenny as Priest

== Production ==
The film began shoot on 13 November 2000 at Hyderabad. The film's budget was around 75 lakhs.

== Soundtrack ==
Ammo Bomma

Film score by Shanmuk
- Released: 2001
- Genre: Soundtrack
- Length: 19:17
- Label: Mayuri Audio
- Producer: Shanmuk

Music composed by Shanmuk. Lyrics were written by Kula Shekar. Music released on Mayuri Audio Company.

No.	Title	Singer(s)	Length
1.	"123 Miketesting"	S. P. Balasubrahmanyam, Usha	4:03
2.	"Kissuliyyammo"	Parthasarathi, Usha	2:48
3.	"Kaaboye Shrimathi"	S. P. Balasubrahmanyam, Usha	3:40
4.	"Chittukukkumante Cheema"	Vinod Babu, Gayatri	4:27
5.	"Oho Sundaree"	Vinod Babu, Usha	4:19
Total length:			19:17

== Reception ==
Full Hyderabad wrote "What looks like a bizarre drama is quite refreshing when seen from a child's perspective. Rajendra Prasad is at his usual comical best. Suman and Jayalakshmi have some immensely forgettable songs to their credit. But it is the doll that steals the show. A nearly ideal film to take your children to this vacation". Andhra Today wrote "The main theme of "parakaaya pravesam" is not so impressively delineated and disappoints the audience thoroughly. Although it may seem to be a movie meant for children, in actuality does not seem to do the job so successfully either and may leave the audience asking for more. Rajendra Prasad's talent seems to have been wasted. Music by Shanmukh is average."
