= Jagannath (1996 film) =

- Directed by: Shibu Mitra
- Produced by: Akram Shaikh
- Starring: Shatrughan Sinha; Mukesh Khanna; Ronit Roy; Sangeeta Bijlani; Rami Reddy; Feroz Khan
- Music by: Arpita Raaj
- Release date: 19 January 1996
- Running time: 143 minutes
- Country: India
- Language: Hindi

Jagannath is a 1996 Indian Hindi-language action film, directed by Shibu Mitra. It stars Shatrughan Sinha and Mukesh Khanna in lead roles along with Ronit Roy, Sangeeta Bijlani, Rami Reddy, Beena Banerjee, Puneet Issar, Reema Lagoo and Feroz Khan. The film was released on 19 Jan 1996.

== Plot ==
Jagan, a poor village blacksmith, is devastated when his son is killed by a wealthy villager. When the legal system fails to deliver justice and lets the rich man go free, Jagan takes matters into his own hands and kills the man responsible. After this act, he becomes known as Jagannath. Now branded a criminal, Jagannath must confront the deeply corrupt judicial and political system of Ranigadh, where power and money often override truth and justice. The film follows his struggle against this system as he seeks redemption and justice for his family.

== Cast ==
- Shatrughan Sinha as Jagan /Jagannath
- Mukesh Khanna as Arvind Kapoor
- Sangeeta Bijlani as Jyoti
- Ronit Roy as Ajay Kapoor
- Rami Reddy as Bhujang Babu
- Puneet Issar as Inspector Balwant
- Feroz Khan as Manga
- Beena Banerjee as Bharti
- Reema Lagoo as Doctor
- Satyendra Kapoor as Dinanath aka Dinu Chacha
- Paintal as Girjaa
- Jagdish Raj as Mohan Sinha
