= Dilip Prabhavalkar =

Indian actor and writer (born 1944)

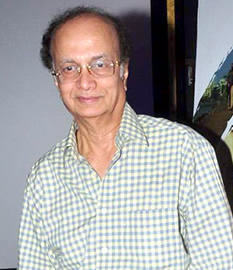
- Prabhavalkar in 2015
- Born: 4 August 1944 (age 82); Bombay, Bombay Province, British India
- Education: Ramnarain Ruia College (B.sc.); Bhabha Atomic Research Centre (M.sc. & Diploma)
- Occupations: Actor, author
- Years active: 1972 - present
- Spouse: Neela Prabhavalkar (m. 1973)
- Honours: Sangeet Natak Akademi Award (2010); Bal Sahitya Puraskar (2011); V. Shantaram Special Contribution Award (2011)

Dilip Prabhavalkar (born 4 August 1944) is an Indian Marathi actor, director, playwright and author. He has a career spanning over five decades in Hindi and Marathi theatre, television and movies. He is recipient of a National Film Award, five Maharashtra State Film Awards, two Filmfare Awards Marathi and a Zee Chitra Gaurav Puraskar. He was honoured with Sangeet Natak Akademi Award and V. Shantaram Special Contribution Award in 2011 by the Government of Maharashtra.

== Early life ==
Born in Mumbai, Dilip Prabhavalkar obtained a bachelor's degree in Chemistry from Ramnarain Ruia College, Matunga. He gained his master's degree in Biophysics and a diploma from the Bhabha Atomic Research Centre, Mumbai, before working for a pharmaceutical company. He joined as a partner in a video production unit. During this period, he performed as an actor in several children's and experimental plays staged at Chhabildas. In 1991, he decided to give up this dual existence of working and doing plays simultaneously and chose acting as a career.

== Career ==
=== Acting ===
He started performing as an actor in children's plays and experimental plays. His first major performance was in Lobh Nasava Hi Vinanti, a play written by Vijay Tendulkar and directed by Arvind Deshpande, which was well received. He went on to star in various plays including Vaasuchi Sasu, Sandhyachaya, Naatigoti, Javai Maza Bhala, Kalam 302 and Ghar Tighanche Have. He debuted on Marathi television by playing Chimanrao in the television serial Chimanrao Gundyabhau. He went on to star in television shows like Turtur and Shriyut Gangadhar Tipre. He also played various characters in Hasva Fasvi, a Marathi play.

He is known for his versatility and is known for transforming himself into the characters he plays. He gained recognition for his various comedic and dramatic film roles, notably in Ek Daav Bhutacha (1982), Zapatlela (1993) and Chaukat Raja (1991). In 1991, he decided to choose acting as a career. In children's and amateur theatre, Prabhavalkar was associated with Ratnakar Matkari's group and performed in all the plays staged by the troupe. His performances of a simpleton in Prem Kahani and Vidur in Aranyak — a play based on the Mahabharat — were awarded prizes at the Maharashtra State Drama Festival.

Prabhavalkar starred in the Bollywood movie Encounter: The Killing as an old gangster, Punappa Avade in 2002. He portrayed Mahatma Gandhi in the 2006 hit Lage Raho Munna Bhai. He reprised his role in the Telugu remake called Shankar Dada Zindabad. From the experimental stage, Prabhavalkar very easily moved to the professional stage in 1976, and since then has acted in plays from slapstick to light comedy, family drama, and melodrama, to serious discussion plays dealing with contemporary issues.

Prabhavalkar was recently seen in Faster Fene, a movie inspired by the popular Marathi book series of the same name, authored by B. R. Bhagwat, who he portrays in the film. The film is about a young boy who uncovers an educational scam using his detective prowess. In 2018, he did a talk show called Chimanrao Tey Gandhi, where he narrated the process behind each of his roles.

In 2025, he starred Dashavatar which become highest grossing marathi film of year.

=== Writing ===
In 1994, he wrote a play titled Chuk Bhul Dyavi Ghyavi. He has authored 28 books and has also won a Sahitya Akademi Award for his children’s book, Bokya Satbande.

== Filmography ==
=== Films ===
Year	Title	Role	Language	Notes
1982	Ek Daav Bhutacha	Master	Marathi	
1987	Chhakke Panje	Raja Bairagi	Marathi	
1989	Dharla Tar Chavtay	Dr. Pralhad Tonage	Marathi	
1991	Chaukat Raja	Nandu	Marathi	
1992	Ek Hota Vidushak	Chief Minister	Marathi	
1993	Zapatlela	Tatya Vinchu	Marathi	
1995	Khilona Bana Khalnayak	Tatya Bichu	Hindi	
1995	Beqabu	Behrupiya Raja's Friend	Hindi	-
1996	Katha Don Ganpatravanchi	Ganpatrao	Marathi	
1998	Sarkarnama	Cultural Minister	Marathi	
1999	Ratra Aarambh	Shridhar Phadke	Marathi	
2000	Nidaan	Shrikant Kamat	Hindi	
2002	Encounter: The Killing	Ponappa Awadhe	Hindi	
2003	Chupke Se	Megha's father/Income Tax officer	Hindi	
2004	Aga Bai Arrecha!	Shriranga Deshmukh's father	Marathi	
2004	Pachadlela	Inamdar Bhusnale	Marathi	
2005	Paheli	Kanwarlal, Bhanwarlal's brother	Hindi	
2006	Shiva	Chief Minister	Telugu	
2006	Lage Raho Munna Bhai	Mohandas Karamchand Gandhi	Hindi	Won the National Award for Best Supporting Actor
2007	Shankar Dada Zindabad	Mohandas Karamchand Gandhi	Telugu	Remake of Lage Raho Munna Bhai
2008	Sarkar Raj	Rao Saab	Hindi	
2008	C Kkompany	Sadashiv Pradhan	Hindi	
2008	Full 3 Dhamaal	M.K Dandy	Marathi	
2008	Valu	Pandit	Marathi	
2009	Bokya Satbande	Mr. Bhilwandi	Marathi	Based on book Bokya Satbande written by himself.
2009	Sankat City	Ganpat Gajanan Jagirdar	Hindi	
2010	Jhing Chik Jhing	Kavi	Marathi	
2011	Deool	Appa Kulkarni	Marathi	
2011	Morya	Kamat Kaka	Marathi	
2012	Shala	Appa	Marathi	
2012	Gola Berij	Antu Barva	Marathi	
2013	Narbachi Wadi	Naroba	Marathi	
2013	Postcard	The Old Man	Marathi	
2013	Ramchandra Purushottam Joshi	Ramchandra Purushottam Joshi	Marathi	
2013	Zapatlela 2	Tatya Vinchu	Marathi	
2014	Poshter boyz	Jagan Deshmukh (Appa)	Marathi	
2014	Jayjaykar	Major Akhand	Marathi	
2015	Slam Book	Ajoba	Marathi	
2015	Nagrik	Manikrao Bhosale	Marathi	
2015	Murder Mestri	Dr.Madhav Mestri	Marathi	
2016	Ganvesh	Vinayakrao Deshmukh – Education Minister	Marathi	
2016	Family Katta	Madhukar Sabnis (Bhai)	Marathi	
2017	Faster Fene	Bhaskar Ramachandra Bhagwat	Marathi	
2017	Zala Bobhata	Appa	Marathi	
2017	Dashakriya	Patresavkar	Marathi	
2018	Pimpal	Arvind	Marathi	
2018	Me Shivaji Park	Prof. Dilip Pradhan	Marathi	
2019	Dithee	Santu	Marathi	
2022	Dil Dimag Aur Batti	Manmohan Desai	Marathi	
2024	Panchak	Anant Khot	Marathi	
2024	Aata Vel Zaali	Shashidhar Lele	Marathi	
2025	Dashavatar	Babuli Mestry	Marathi	

=== Television ===
Year	Title	Role	Language	Channel	Notes
1977-1979	Chimanrao Gundyabhau	Chimanrao	Marathi	Doordarshan	Telecasted in 1977-79 and based on book Chimanrao Charhat written by C. V. Joshi
1986	Zopi Gelela Jaga Zala	Dinoo	Marathi	Doordarshan	
1987	Kaam Phatte	Wadkar	Marathi	Doordarshan	
1989	Chal Navachi Vachal Vasti	Ghadyalkaka	Marathi	Doordarshan	
1993	Salsood	Bhargav	Marathi	Doordarshan	
1995	Raja Raje	Raje	Marathi	Doordarshan	
1999-2000	Gubbare	Deshpande	Hindi	Zee TV	
2001-2005	Shriyut Gangadhar Tipre	Aaba	Marathi	Zee Marathi	
2017	Chukbhul Dyavi Ghyavi	Rajabhau	Marathi	Zee Marathi	
2022	Modern Love Mumbai	Nazrul	Hindi	Amazon Prime Video	
2025	The Secret of the Shiledars	Dr Krishnakant	Hindi	Disney Hotstar	

=== Theater ===
- Double role as Anna and the mother-in-law in Pradeep Dalvi's farce Vasuchi Sasu.
- The Old Rajabhau in Chukbhul Dyavi Ghyavi, a light comedy written by Prabhavalkar.
- The caring, possessive father in Ratnakar Matkari's drama Jawai Maza Bhala.
- The senile Nana in Jaywant Dalvi's Sandhyachhaya.
- The double role of the debonair, flirtatious Raje and a local constable in Prof. Toradmal's Kalam 302 (adaptation of Sleuth).
- The alcoholic barrister in Ratnakar Matkari's Ghar Tighancha Hava (a play on the life of Tarabai Modak).
- The nondescript but determined common man in P. L. Deshpande's Ek Zunj Waryashi (an adaptation of The Last Appointment).
- The father of a disabled son in Jaywant Dalvi's Natigoti.
- Six characterisations in Hasvaphasvi, a comedy written by Prabhavalkar.
- A buck-toothed apparently harmless man who in reality is a twisted, evil man in Salsood.
- A naive, innocent schoolteacher who is assisted by a ghost in Ek Dav Bhutacha.
- A disabled professor in "Waah Guru".
- Tatyasaheb in Patra Patri directed by Vijay Kenkre

== Awards ==
- 1972 - Best Amateur Actor ("Prem Kahani") Maharashtra State Award.
- 1992 - Maharashtra State Award for best actor for his portrayal of a disabled boy in the film Chaukat Raja.
- 1999 - Filmfare Best Actor Award(Marathi) for the film Ratraaarambh
- 2006 - Bal Gandharva Puraskar
- 2006 - National Film Award for best supporting actor in Lage Raho Munnabhai
- 2008 - National Film Award for best supporting actor in Shevri, a Marathi film.
- 2010 - Sangeet Natak Akademi Award for his contribution as an actor to Indian Theatre.
- Natavarya Mama Pendse Puraskrut Natasamrat Ganpatrao Bhagwat Puraskar
- 2012 - V. Shantaram Special Contribution Award
- 2015 - Suvarnaratna Awards(Best Actor)
- 2019 - PIFF Distinguished Award for Outstanding Contribution to Indian cinema.
