= Pooja Pawar =

Indian actress

- Born: Kolhapur, Maharashtra
- Occupation: Actress
- Years active: 1987 – 1999; 2014 – present

Pooja Pawar is an Indian actress in Marathi cinema and television. She appeared in Marathi cinema during the late 1980s and early 1990s.

== Career ==
Born in Kolhapur, Pooja Pawar made her acting debut at the age of 16 with Sarja (1987), which went on to win the National Film Award for Best Feature Film in Marathi. She is known for films such as Chikat Navra (1994), Ek Hota Vidushak (1992), Zapatlela (1993), Vishwavinayak (1994), and Topi Var Topi (1995). Zapatlela (1993) remains among the most popular films in Marathi cinema. She then took a break from acting after her marriage and returned to television.

== Filmography ==
=== Movies ===
| Year | Title | Role | Notes | Ref |
|---|---|---|---|---|
| 1987 | Sarja | Kastura | Debut | |
| 1989 | Utawala Navra | Shanta | | |
| 1989 | Rajane Wajavila Baja | Mogra | | |
| 1992 | Ek Hota Vidushak | Subhadra | | |
| 1992 | Anuradha | Seema | | |
| 1993 | Zapatlela | Aavdi | | |
| 1994 | Chikat Navra | Jayu | | |
| 1994 | Majha Chakula | Maina | | |
| 1994 | Sonyachi Mumbai | | | |
| 1994 | Zadpi Lido | Aarti | | |
| 1994 | Vishwavinayak | Uma | | |
| 1995 | Painjan | Laila | | |
| 1995 | Topi Var Topi | Sheela | | |
| 1999 | Rang Premacha | Baby | | |
| 2014 | Headline | | | |
| 2015 | Dhangarwada | | | |
| 2017 | Dhondi | | | |
| 2019 | Ashi Hi Aashiqui | Amarja's Mother | | |
| 2019 | Purushottam | | | |
| 2022 | Flicker | Jyoti Sawant | | |

=== Television ===
| Year | Title | Role | Channel | Ref. |
|---|---|---|---|---|
| 2014 | Asmita | Asha Prabhakar Agnihotri | Zee Marathi | |
| 2017 | Baapmanus | Aaisaheb Zunjarrao | Zee Yuva | |
| 2019-2020 | Aai Kuthe Kay Karte! | Reshma Polekar | Star Pravah | |
| 2019 | Alti Palti Sumdit Kalti | | Zee Marathi | |
| 2020-2021 | Karbhari Laybhari | Kanchan Suryavanshi | Zee Marathi | |
| 2023–2024 | Kavyanjali – Sakhi Savali | Meenakshi Prabhudesai | Colors Marathi | |
| 2025 | Halad Rusli Kunku Hasla | Baljabai | Star Pravah | |
