= Vijay Chavan =

Indian actor

- Born: 2 May 1955; Bombay, Bombay State, India (present-day Maharashtra)
- Died: 24 August 2018 (aged 63); Fortis Hospital, Mulund, Mumbai, India
- Occupation: Actor
- Years active: 1985–2018
- Notable work: Moruchi Mavshi; Shrimant Damodar Pant
- Spouse: Vibhavari chavan ()

Vijay Chavan (2 May 1955 – 24 August 2018) was an Indian film, television and stage actor, notable for his work in Marathi and Hindi cinema.

He was best known for his role of Mavshi in the famous Marathi stage drama "Moruchi Mavshi". This comedy play was written by Pralhad Keshav Atre. He died on 24 August 2018 in Mumbai at the age of 63.

== Filmography ==
He appeared in many Marathi movies including Mumbaicha Dabewala (2007), Shrimanta Damodar Panta (2013) and Sasu Cha Swayamwar (2015).

Year	Film	Role
1985	Vahinichi Maya	
1989	Gholat Ghol	
1984	Aali Lahar Kela Kahar	
1991	Maherchi Sadi	
1991	Shame To Shame	
1992	Yeu ka Gharat	
1993	Zapatlela	
1994	Majha Chakula	
2002	Ashi Asavi Sasu	
2003	Chimani Pakhar	
2004	Pachhadlela	
2006	Jatra: Hyalagaad Re Tyalagaad	
2007	Bharat Aala Parat	
2007	Mumbaicha Dabewala	
2013	Shrimant Damodar Pant	
2015	Sasu Cha Swayamwar	
2016	A Dot Com Mom	
2016	Kaul Manacha	
