= Bhaskar Ramachandra Bhagwat =

Indian writer and editor (1910–2001)

- Born: 31-May-1910
- Died: 27-October-2001
- Known for: Children's Literature
- Spouse: Leelawati Bhaskar Bhagwat (wife)

Bhaskar Ramachandra Bhagwat also known as Bha.Ra. Bhagwat, was an editor, author of Marathi children's books. He was the founder of Balmitra magazine.

== Life and works ==
He is perhaps best known for the character he created, Faster Fene and the books series revolving around his adventures. B.R. alias Bha Ra Bhagwat was born in Indore in 1910 and educated in Nasik and Dhule. In 1941 he joined the All India Radio in New Delhi as a newsreader. Following the broadcast of Mahatma Gandhi's arrest, Bhagwat went underground to join the freedom struggle in Mumbai. He was arrested and jailed for almost two years. After independence, Bha Ra devoted himself to translating the science fiction of Jules Verne and H.G. Wells into Marathi. From 1950 to 1957 he published a very popular Marathi magazine for children, called Balmitra. Bha Ra also created the character Faster Fene, who became immensely popular among Marathi children. The work was later serialized on Doordarshan. Bha Ra wrote around 200 books and was also proficient in writing comic strips. He died in 2001. One of the most prolific children's writers in Marathi, B.R. Bhagwat has won several prestigious literature awards.
