= Ramdas Padhye =

Indian ventriloquist, puppeteer and puppet maker

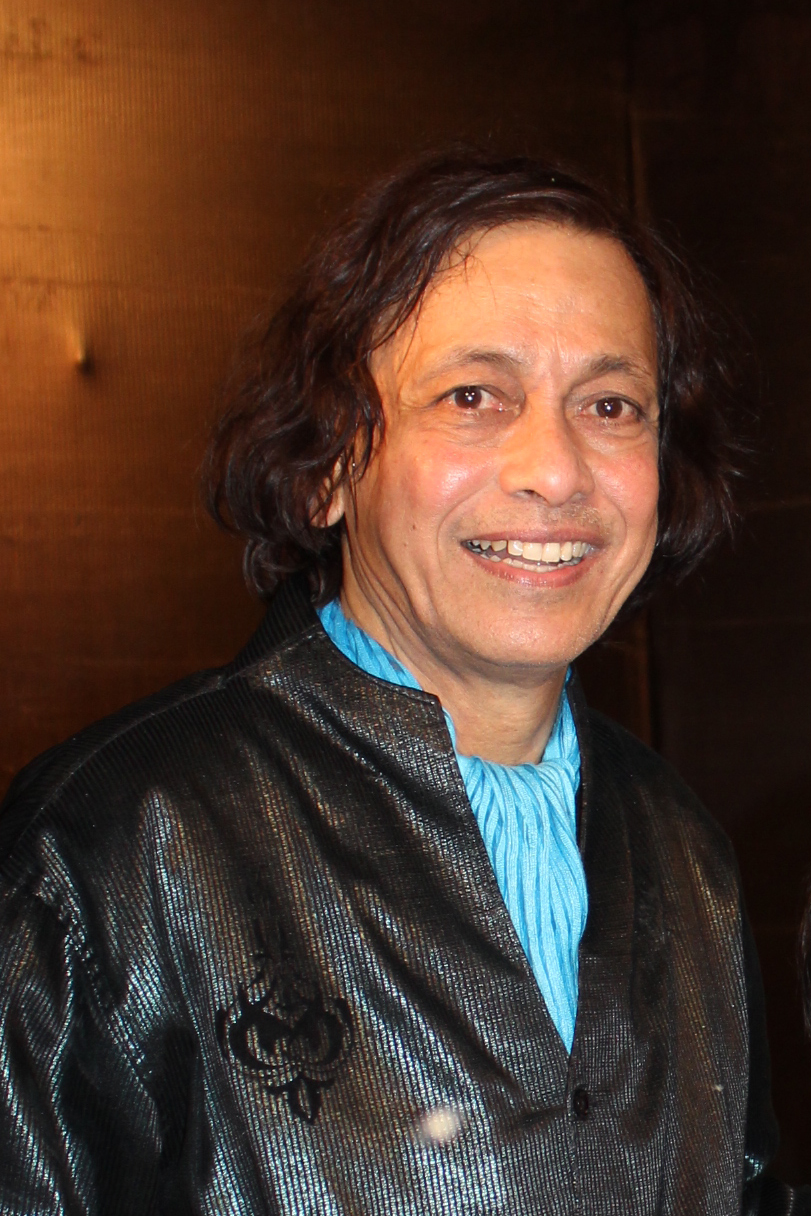
- Padhye in 2016
- Born: Ramdas Padhye; January 24, 1948 (age 78); Mumbai, Maharashtra, India
- Occupations: Ventriloquism; Puppetry; Puppeteer; Puppet maker
- Spouse: Aparna Padhye
- Parent: Yeshwant K Padhye (father)

Ramdas Padhye (born 24 January 1948) is an Indian ventriloquist, puppeteer and puppet maker. He has performed in India and abroad for five decades. Ramdas did his first TV debut in 1972 along with his puppet 'Ardhavatrao' when Doordarshan called him to do a 15-minute show.

Ramdas was the first Indian ventriloquist to perform on various International television network like NBC, CBS and BBC.

Ramdas Padhye also trained Bollywood actors like Amitabh Bachchan and Aditya Roy Kapur in ventriloquism.

== Career ==
Ramdas also performed before the former Prime Minister of India Indira Gandhi in New Delhi in the year 1968.

In 2001, American puppeteer Robert Rockwood used puppets made by Ramdas Padhye at Atlanta.

In 2020, Ramdas along with his son Satyajit Padhye designed India's first 3D printed puppet for film Ludo.

== Filmography ==
Key
†	Denotes films that have not yet been released

Performed in films
Year	Film	Note(s)
1983	Mahaan	
1993	Zapatlela	
2002	Dil Hai Tumhaara	
2013	Zapatlela 2	
TBA	Zapatlela 3 †	

Television
Show	Platform	Ref(s)
Gharat Basale Saare	Zee Marathi	
Meri Bhi Suno	Doordarshan	
