= List of ventriloquists =

This is a list of notable ventriloquists and their best known characters. It is ordered by nationality or country in which they were notable in an alphabetical order, and then by alphabetical order of surname. It does not include voice-over artists who did not perform with a figure, or "dummy" as it is usually called.

== Australia ==
- Showko Showfukutei – "Ninja Ken", "Sushi Master", "Herro Kitty"

== Canada ==
- Jerry Layne, "Lester and Herbie"

== France ==
- Jeff Panacloc – "Jean-Marc"

== India ==
- Y. K. Padhye (192? - 1967)
- Indushree Raveendra- "Dinku" ,"Grandpa" ,"Ner
- Mimicry Srinivos – "Old Man", "Little Boy", "Caesar Chimp"″micey″

== Ireland ==
- Patrick Gallagher (1800 - 1863)

== Italy ==
- Pietro Ghislandi – "Sergio"

== Spain ==
- Señor Wences (1896 - 1999) – "Johnny", "Pedro", "Cecilia Chicken"

== Sweden ==
- Zillah & Totte

== United Kingdom ==
- Ray Alan (1930 - 2010) – "Mickey the Martian", "Lord Charles", "Tich and Quackers"
- Peter Brough (1916 - 1999) – "Archie Andrews"
- Ken Dodd (1927 - 2018) - "Dickie Mint"
- Nina Conti – "Monkey", "Granny", "Nina", "Killer", "Great Uncle John"
- Roger De Courcey – "Nookie Bear"
- Terry Hall (1926 - 2007) – "Lenny the Lion"
- Keith Harris (1947 - 2015) – "Orville the Duck", "Cuddles the Monkey"
- Steve Hewlett – "Arthur Lager", "Pongo", "Chii Chii"
- Sandy Powell (1900 - 1982)
- Terri Rogers (1937 - 1999) – "Shorty Harris"
- Fred Russell (1862 - 1957) – "Coster Joe"
- Saveen (1914 - 1994) – "Daisy May"
- Ian Saville
- Dennis Spicer (1935 - 1964) – "James Green"
- Frank Travis (1854 - 1931)
- Arthur Worsley (1920 - 2001) – "Charlie Brown"
- Harry Worth (1917 - 1989) - "Fortheringay" & "Clarence"
- Paul Zerdin – "Sam", "Baby", "Albert", "Alasdair Rimmer", "Roger the Bodyguard"

== United States ==
- Jim Barber – "Barber & Seville", "Diva", "Chico Pete", "Baby", "Ventriloquist Karaoke", "Strum the Guitar", "JR"
- Matt Bennett – "Rex Powers" (Victorious)
- Edgar Bergen (1903 - 1978) – "Charlie McCarthy", "Mortimer Snerd", "Effie Klinker"
- Shirley Dinsdale (1926 - 1999) – "Judy Splinters"
- Jeff Dunham – "Peanut", "Walter", "Jose Jalapeño on a Stick", "Bubba J", "Achmed the Dead Terrorist", "Achmed Jr.", "Diane", "Url", "Seamus", "Larry", "Little Jeff", "Sweet Daddy Dee", "Melvin the Superhero Guy"
- Alyse Eady – "Rosie", "Molly", "Crazy Bird", "Rocky"
- Terry Fator – "Emma Taylor", "Winston the Impersonating Turtle", "Walter T. Airdale", "Maynard Tompkins"
- Wayne Federman – "Beuford"
- Jay Johnson – "Squeaky", "Bob", "Grits", "Darwin"
- Kevin Johnson – "Clyde", "Matilda"
- Jerry Layne (ventriloquist) (1938 - 2018) - “Lester & Chester”, “Baby”, “Max”, “Cogburn”, “Sid”
- Mallory Lewis – "Lamb Chop"
- Shari Lewis (1933 - 1998) – "Lamb Chop", "Charlie Horse", "Hush Puppy"
- Susan Linn - "Audrey Duck", "Cat-a-lion", "Timberlane Wolf"
- Ronn Lucas – "Buffalo Billy", "Chuck Roast", "Scorch", "Tillie the Troll"
- Darci Lynne – "Petunia", "Oscar", "Edna Doorknocker", "Katie", "Okie", "Scarlett", "Ace", "Nigel", "Ivan", "Andy"
- Taylor Mason – "Paco the Pig", "Romeo", "Juliet", "Sumo", "Robert the Sheep", "Barack Obama", "Colonel", "Paquito"
- Jimmy Nelson (1928 - 2019) – "Danny O'Day", "Farfel the Dog"
- Otto Petersen (1960 - 2014) – "George"
- Carla Rhodes – "Cecil Sinclaire"
- David Strassman – "Chuck Wood", "Ted E. Bare"
- Max Terhune (1891 - 1973) – "Elmer"
- Willie Tyler – "Lester"
- Jules Vernon (1867 - 1937) – "Old Maid", "George", "Nettie", "Sailor Joe", "Happy"
- Mark Wade – "Grits", "Karl the Alligator"
- Kenny Warren – "Joey O'Leary", "Leroy Cool"
- Lisa Whelchel – "Arthur" (The Mickey Mouse Club)
- Paul Winchell (1922 - 2005) – "Jerry Mahoney", "Knucklehead Smiff"
- Ignacio Estrada (1946 - 2024) – "Maclovio", "Tortiya Monster"
