= 1840 in literature =

This article contains information about the literary events and publications of 1840.

== Events ==
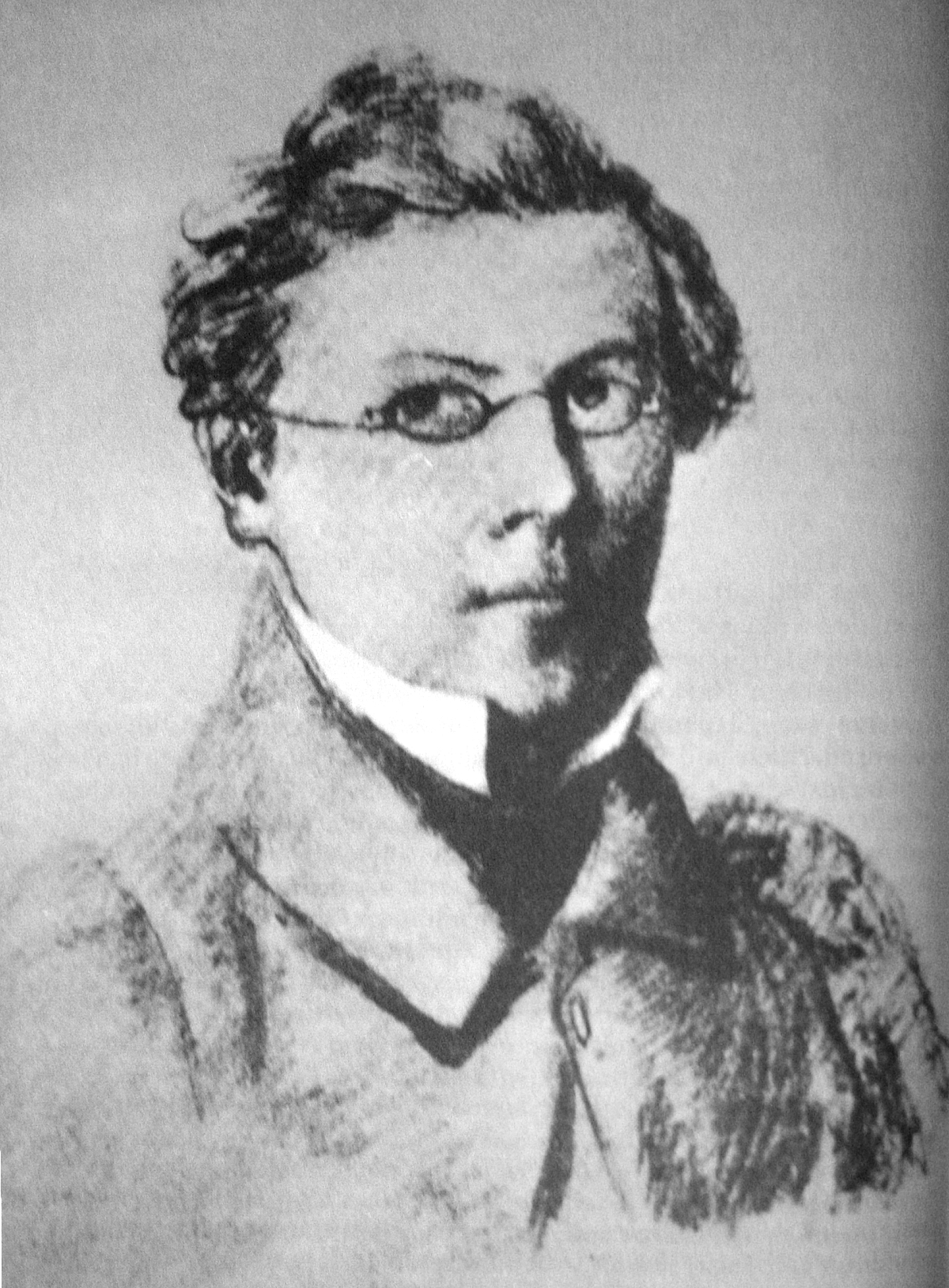
Fritz Reuter, 1833 self-portrait

- June – An amnesty to mark the accession of King Frederick William IV of Prussia frees the novelist Fritz Reuter from the Dömitz Fortress after two years' imprisonment on a charge of high treason.
- July 6 – Novelists Charles Dickens and William Makepeace Thackeray independently attend the hanging outside Newgate Prison in London of the murderer François Benjamin Courvoisier, who blames the influence of W. Harrison Ainsworth's Newgate novel Jack Sheppard (which concluded serialization in Bentley's Miscellany in February) for his crime. Thackeray writes the experience up as "Going to See a Man Hanged" in this month's issue of Fraser's Magazine; Dickens in The Daily News in February 1846. Thackeray's first novel, Catherine, serialization of which also concluded in February, had been intended as a critique of the Newgate novel.
- August 10 – Fortsas hoax: Bibliophiles gather in Binche, Belgium for an auction of 52 unique, meticulously catalogued books from the collection of the late Comte de Fortsas. The Count, the books and the auction all prove fictitious.
- unknown dates
  - The Percy Society is established in Britain to publish scholarly editions of early works in English.
  - William Martin publishes the first edition of Peter Parley's Annual, a periodical imitating earlier American works by Samuel Griswold Goodrich.

== New books ==
=== Fiction ===
- W. Harrison Ainsworth
  - Guy Fawkes (serialization)
  - The Tower of London (serialization)
- Hans Christian Andersen – The Wicked Prince
- Henry Cockton – Valentine Vox
- James Fenimore Cooper – The Pathfinder, or The Inland Sea
- Charles Dickens – The Old Curiosity Shop (serialization in Master Humphrey's Clock)
- Alexandre Dumas, père – Otho the Archer
- Thomas Ingoldsby (Richard Harris Barham) – The Ingoldsby Legends (collected in book form)
- Friedrich Reinhold Kreutzwald – Plague of Wine
- Mikhail Lermontov – A Hero of Our Time
- Harriet Martineau – The Hour and the Man
- Prosper Mérimée – Colomba
- John Neal
  - Seventy-Six; or, Love and Battle (London publication)
  - Logan, the Mingo Chief. A Family History (London publication)
- Edgar Allan Poe – Tales of the Grotesque and Arabesque
- William Makepeace Thackeray – Catherine (serialization concludes)*
- Frances Milton Trollope – Michael Armstrong, the Factory Boy

=== Children ===
- Hans Christian Andersen – The Wicked Prince (Den onde Fyrste, published in Salon, October)
- Esther Copley – Early Friendship. A Tale for Young People
- Frederick Marryat
  - Olla Podrida
  - Poor Jack

=== Drama ===
- Nikolai Gogol - The Gamblers
- Namiki Gohei III – Kanjinchō (勧進帳)
- James Haynes – Mary Stuart
- Christian Hebbel – Judith
- James Kenney – The Sicilian Vespers
- Andreas Munch – Donna Clara
- Thomas Serle – Master Clarke
- Thomas Talfourd – Glencoe
- Jose Zorilla – El Zapatero y el Rey

=== Poetry ===
- Victor Hugo – Les Rayons et les Ombres
- Mikhail Lermontov – Mtsyri (The Novice)
- Henry Wadsworth Longfellow – "The Wreck of the Hesperus"
- Taras Shevchenko – Kobzar (The Bard)

=== Non-fiction ===
- Louis Agassiz – Études sur les glaciers
- Richard Henry Dana Jr. – Two Years Before the Mast
- Pierre-Joseph Proudhon – What is Property? or, An Inquiry into the Principle of Right and of Government (Qu'est-ce que la propriété ? ou Recherche sur le principe du Droit et du Gouvernement)
- Dimitrie Ralet – Scrieri (Writings)
- Anton Schindler – Biographie von Ludwig van Beethoven
- Agnes Strickland – Lives of the Queens of England (begins publication)
- Alexis de Tocqueville – Democracy in America (De La Démocratie en Amérique) (vol. 2)
- Flora Tristan – Promenades dans Londres (Promenades in London)
- William Whewell – The Philosophy of the Inductive Sciences, founded upon their history

== Births ==
- January 18 – Henry Austin Dobson, English poet and essayist (died 1921)
- January 21 – Sophia Jex-Blake, English medical writer and pioneer female physician (died 1912)
- January 26 – Esther Tuttle Pritchard, American editor, educator, and missionary (died 1900)
- February 5 – Charlotte Carmichael Stopes, Scottish writer and women's rights activist (died 1929)
- February 15 – Titu Maiorescu, Romanian culture critic, philosopher, and political figure (died 1917)
- April 2 – Émile Zola, French novelist (died 1902)
- May 1 – Cynthia S. Burnett, American editor, educator, and reformer (died 1932)
- June 2 – Thomas Hardy, English novelist and poet (died 1928)
- June – Emma L. Shaw, American editor (died 1924)
- July 2 – Ludwig Rosenthal, German antiquarian bookseller (died 1928)
- August 6 – Mildred Amanda Baker Bonham, American travel writer (died 1907)
- August 17 – Wilfrid Scawen Blunt, English poet and radical (died 1922)
- August 20 – Seraph Frissell, American physician and writer (died 1915)
- September 2
  - Emilia, Lady Dilke as Emily Francis Strong, English art historian (died 1904)
  - Giovanni Verga, Sicilian author (died 1922)
- September 19 – Helen Ekin Starrett, American author, magazine founder, and school founder (died 1920)
- September 27 – Rosa Nouchette Carey, English children's novelist (died 1909)
- October 23 – Mary Mathews Adams, Irish-born American writer and philanthropist (died 1902)
- November 8 – Esther E. Baldwin, American missionary and writer (died 1910)
- November 29 – Rhoda Broughton, Welsh novelist and short-story writer (died 1920)
- December 28 – Ioan Kalinderu, Romanian classical scholar, jurist and agriculturalist (died 1913)

== Deaths ==
- January 6 – Frances Burney (Fanny Burney, Mme d'Arblay), English novelist and diarist (born 1752)
- February 4 – Angélique de Rouillé, Belgian letter-writer (born 1756)
- February 11 – Ivan Kozlov, Russian poet and translator (born 1779)
- March 3 – Charles Reece Pemberton, British actor and dramatist (born 1790)
- May 25 – Louisa Capper, English writer, philosopher and poet (born 1776)
- May 30 – Mary Boyle, Countess of Cork and Orrery, Irish literary hostess (born 1746)
- June 7 – Népomucène Lemercier, poet and dramatist (born 1771)
- July 7 – Nikolai Stankevich, Russian philosopher and poet (born 1813)
- August 25 – Karl Leberecht Immermann, German novelist and dramatist (born 1796)
- September – Emma Roberts, English travel writer and poet (born 1794)
- December 8 – Eliza Fenwick, English novelist and children's writer (born (born 1766)
