= List of Young Achievers Award winners =

The Young Achievers Awards is a national competition held annually in Uganda which selects and promotes the best practice and excellence in youth creativity. The following is the list of Young Achievers Award winners. It provides an opportunity for people from all walks of life to work together to address national developmental challenges in ICT, the Arts, Health, Education, Gender and access to better lives.

== 2011 Winners ==
Overall winner of the 2011 Young Achievers Awards was the future CEO of the Inspire Africa Group and founder of Africa Coffee Park, Nelson Tugume. In addition, the overall winner is entitled to $500,000. The award was him presented by the President of Rwanda Paul Kagame

Media and Society

- Nigel M. Nassar
- Grace Atuhaire
- Bushra Namirembe
- Nixion Jet Tumusiime
- Racheal Yiga

Film and Television

- Abubakar Muwonge
- Humphrey Nabimanya
- Isaac nekimiah Oboth
- Usama Mukwaya
- Shawn kimuli

Q Music

- Keko Jocelyne Tracy
- Ivan Earl Agaba
- Tabu Flo Dance Company
- Walakira Richard
- Joseph Mwima

Arts, Fashion and Culture

- Brenda Nuwagaba
- Patricia Kamara Ainembabazi
- Beatrice Lamwaka
- Karen Kemiyondo Coutinho
- Bruno Ruganzu Tusingwire

Leadership and governance

- Moses Okot
- Manige Merabu
- Steven arinitwe
- Joseph Odumna

Sports

- Annet Negesa
- Regina atheino
- Justine Kimono
- Benjamin Komakech
- Davis Arinaitwe Karashani

Environment

- Vianney Tumwesigye
- Rehema Nakyazze
- Mugisha Moses
- Ssenyonjo Julius
- Roay Rosenblith

Business and Trade

- Aron Ahikiriza
- Eva kabejja
- Gerald katabazi
- Martin Ssali
- Brian Mugisha Niwagaba

ICT

- Billy Branks Kaye
- Albert Mucunguzi
- Mordecai Musonge
- Joseph Owino
- Arthur Ntozi

== 2013 Winners ==
Media and Journalism award

- Flavia Tumusiime

Outstanding performing Arts

- Keneth kimuli

Ericsson Innovation excellence Award

- Davis Musinguzi

Farming and Agro-Processing

- Eric and Rebecca Kaduru

Leadership and Social Enterprise

Sports Personality Award

- Phiona Mutesi

Heroes Award

- Esther Kalenzi of 40 Days Over 40 Smiles Foundation

Lifetime Achievement Award

- James Mulwana

Star Hall of Fame

- Phiona Mutesi

== 2017 Winners ==
Media and Journalism award

- Ronald Wandera

Creative Arts (Fashion)

- Brian Ahumuza

Creative Arts (Music)

- Milege

Social Entrepreneurship Award

- Muhammed Kisirisa

Innovations & ICT Award

- Gerald Otim

Farming and Agro-Processing

- Zilla Mary Arach

Business Award

- Ricky Rapa Thompson

Sports Personality Award

Heroes Award

Lifetime Achievement Award

Star Hall of Fame

- Amelia Kyambadde
