= Aisha Kasolo =

Ugandan development project coordinator

Ruth Aisha Biyinzika Kasolo
- Other name: Aisha Kasolo
- Education: Bachelor's, master's and doctoral degrees in business administration
- Occupation: Development project manager
- Employer: Private Sector Foundation Uganda
- Known for: Coordinating the World Bank-funded GROW project for women-owned enterprises
- Title: National Project Coordinator, GROW project

Ruth Aisha Biyinzika Kasolo, commonly known as Aisha Kasolo, is a Ugandan business administrator and development project manager. She is the national project coordinator of the Generating Growth Opportunities and Productivity for Women Enterprises (GROW) project, a World Bank-funded programme hosted by the Private Sector Foundation Uganda (PSFU) that supports women-owned businesses. She also publishes business and personal-development videos on social media, for which the Uganda Journalists Association recognised her in 2023.

== Education ==
Kasolo holds bachelor's, master's and doctoral degrees in business administration. She has also completed professional courses in project management, gender and trade policy, small and medium enterprise development, early childhood learning and Islamic banking.

== Career ==
Kasolo has experience in designing and implementing multilateral development projects funded by the World Bank, the European Union, the Department for International Development and the Asian Development Bank. Her areas of work include private sector development, human capital development, women's empowerment, skills and trade development, gender mainstreaming, early childhood development and the deepening of financial services.

=== Private Sector Foundation Uganda ===
At the Private Sector Foundation Uganda, Kasolo coordinates the GROW project. Reports in 2023 described her as a PSFU project director, and later reports describe her as the project's coordinator.

The GROW project is valued at about US$217 million and is financed by the World Bank. It aims to help women-owned businesses grow from micro to small enterprises and from small to medium enterprises, through access to finance, training and business development services, and infrastructure such as common-user and childcare facilities. The project also involves the Ministry of Gender, Labour and Social Development, the Office of the Prime Minister and Makerere University Business School. The project's credit facility is disbursed through six banks: Centenary Bank, dfcu Bank, Equity Bank, Finance Trust Bank, Post Bank and Stanbic Bank.

As coordinator, Kasolo has publicly explained the facility's terms. In September 2024 she said that loans of between USh 2 million and USh 200 million were available at interest rates of 10 to 10.5 per cent, repayable over up to 24 months, to registered, tax-paying businesses in which women hold at least 51 per cent ownership. She noted that many women entrepreneurs could not borrow without collateral and often faced interest rates as high as 50 per cent. The project is scheduled to end in December 2027. Speaking at the PAKASA Forum at the offices of Enterprise Uganda in Butabika in November 2025, she said that the minimum loan had been reduced from USh 4 million to USh 2 million, that borrowers who repay on time could receive a rebate of 5 to 10 per cent, and that the project also offered apprenticeships, certification support and help with business formalisation.

=== Presidential CEO Forum ===
Kasolo has taken part in the Presidential CEO Forum since its launch. At the forum's fourth edition, held in 2023 at the Kiira Motors plant in Jinja, President Yoweri Museveni commended her for her support to the development of the private sector. According to PML Daily, she had helped "at no cost to bring out the loopholes, distortions, and mistakes in the Government system", and a list of the gaps she identified was forwarded to the Prime Minister.

== Media and public engagement ==
Kasolo produces videos on business, personal growth and well-being, which she publishes on TikTok, YouTube, Facebook and Instagram and which are shared on WhatsApp. At a Women in Media symposium, she advised female journalists to diversify their incomes through side businesses such as farming and animal rearing.

== Recognition ==
In December 2023, the Uganda Journalists Association (UJA) recognised Kasolo for her use of social media to empower Ugandans. UJA president Mathias Rukundo said that her tips had reached millions of Ugandans.
