= Kirunda =

Kirunda is a surname found predominantly in Uganda. The surname is also found amongst the Kikuyu people in Kenya but on a lesser scale when compared to Uganda ln Lineage. Additionally, there is a location in Nyeri district with the same name and it is around the Kutus/Kirinyaga area. At this time it is unknown if there is an ancestral connection between the Ugandans and the Kenyans. However, it should also be noted that the communities bearing this name are of Bantu origin and there is historical data that points to there having been intermarriage between the two communities before and/or during the colonial period. It is unknown if other Kenyan tribes bear this name.

Notable people with the surname include:

- Aaron Kirunda (born 1985), Ugandan social entrepreneur
- Jimmy Kirunda (1950–2020), Ugandan footballer and manager
