= Joseph Owino =

Ugandan entrepreneur

- Born: Tororo, Uganda
- Education: Makerere University
- Occupation: Entrepreneur
- Known for: Kawowo Sports
- Spouse: Daniella Boston (m. 2013)
- Website: josephowino.com

Joseph Geno Owino is a Ugandan entrepreneur with business interests in IT, social media and sports. He is the founder and CEO of Owino Solutions and also the Founder of East African online sports platform, Kawowo Sports.

== Business career ==
Owino runs a web development firm called Owino Solutions Ltd that he started while a student at Makerere University. His company has clients such as Uganda's national referral hospital, Mulago Hospital, telecom company Airtel Uganda and the Federation of Uganda Football Associations (FUFA). Owino also founded Uganda's most popular online local sports platform called Kawowo Sports that publishes local and regional content.

In December 2011, Owino received the Ericsson Young Achievers Award for his contributions to the Ugandan Information and Communications Technology Sector.

== Social media affair ==
On October 27, 2014, Owino was the centre of a media discussion involving President of Uganda Yoweri Kaguta Museveni's social media profiles. Joseph Owino had originally helped streamline and verify the Ugandan president's official Facebook and Twitter accounts.

=== Arrest ===
On October 26, 2014, Owino was arrested from his home in Kampala by police from the Special Investigations Unit. Sarah Kagingo, the Ugandan Special Presidential Assistant for Communications led the police to Owino's residence after accusing him of hacking into Yoweri Kaguta Museveni's social media profiles. Owino spent that night in jail at the Kireka "Wembley" Police Station, Special Investigations Unit in charge of Terrorism and serious crimes.

The next day, Museveni tweeted through his official and verified Twitter account that his account had not been hacked. On Tuesday October 28, a press release from the President's Press Unit reiterated this statement. Instead, the press release explained that the President himself had "personally suspended" Ms. Kagingo a month prior due to "misconduct". Further, the President called from Rome to order Owino's immediate release and an investigation into Kagingo and the police officers who took part in the unwarranted arrest.

== Personal life ==
Owino is married to his British wife, Daniella Boston with whom he lives in Kampala, Uganda.

== See also ==
- Kawowo Sports
