= Robert Maseruka =

Ugandan politician

Hon. Robert Maseruka

Member of Parliament for Mukono South
- In office 2026–2031
- Preceded by: Fred Kayondo
- Constituency: Mukono South

89th Guild President of Makerere University
- In office 2023–2024

Personal details
- Born: February 20, 2000 (age 26) Nakisunga, Mukono District, Uganda
- Citizenship: Uganda
- Education: Makerere University
- Occupation: Politician
- Profession: Journalist, Politician
- Known for: Student leadership and politics

Robert Maseruka (born 20 February 2000), is a Ugandan politician and the 89th Guild president for Makerere University from 2023 to 2024.

== Early life and education ==
Maseruka was born to Simon Ssettuba and Joseline Nanfuka residents of Namuyenje village, Namuyenje parish in Nakisunga Sub-county, Mukono District. He was born in a family of five children and he is the third born.

He went to Kireka Hill Infant School where he finished his primary seven. While there, he served as head prefect in primary six and seven from 2012 to 2013.

He joined Bugema Adventist Secondary School and Wellstar Bright Secondary School, Mukono for his secondary education. At Wellstar Bright Secondary School in his A' level from 2017 to 2018, he served as the head prefect.

In 2020, he joined Makerere University for a Bachelor's degree in Journalism and Communication.

== Career ==
=== Political career ===
Maseruka was the president of the Journalism and Communication class at the Makerere University from 2020 to 2023. In 2022, he was elected to the 88th Makerere University Guild council as the guild representative councilor of the school of Languages, Literature and Communication. He was also the speaker of Nsibirwa Hall.

In 2023, he contested as the guild president first as an indepenent candidate but later on was endorsed by the National Unity Platform party after Margaret Nattabi whom he had lost to in battle for the NUP flag in the primaries was disqualified from the race for holding a public debate. Nattabi herself urged her supporters to back Maseruka’s candidature which boosted his popularity more He was elected the 89th Makerere University Guild President with 2,558 votes beating his closest rival and fellow classmate Hilary Oremo Odwee who got 2,531 votes, Forum for Democratic Change FDC’s Akankunda Sabiiti came third with 2,334 votes. Other candidates; National Resistance Movement- NRM’s Baraka Nkoyooyo 841, Evans Murungi 189, Andrew Lubinga 186, Emmanuel Wanyama 180, Mark Ssebunya 53, and Julius Bigirwa Maxwell came last with 11, and he held that position up to 2024. After his studies at the Makerere University in 2024, he was elected as the Mukono district secretary for the National Unity Platform (NUP). In 2024, he was arrested for participating in the arti-corruption walk to Parliament together with other youths aimed at getting accountability from the government.

In 2025, he contested in the Nation Unity Platform's primaries for the Mukono South parliamentary seat and he emerged winner for the party ticket.

Maseruka was elected in the 2026 Uganda general elections as the member of parliament for Mukono South to the 12th Parliament of Uganda for the period from 2026 to 2031. He contested with 10 other contestants including the incumbent, Fred Kayondo who was the member of parliament for Mukono South in the 11th Parliament of Uganda.

He was appointed Minister of Youth and Children Affairs in Uganda's 2026-2031 shadow cabinet.

== Education advocacy ==
In 2023, he led a campaign called, Save a Makererean, aimed at raising support for students who fail to raise tuition fees to complete their studies at the university.

Maseruka together with Edrine Wafula, the guild president of Kyambongo University then, in May 2023 gave an ultimatum to the National Council for Higher Education (NCHE) giving the regulator a period of two weeks to accredit courses that had been declared expired.

== See also ==
- Ivan Bwowe
- Sarah Kagingo
- Biddemu Bazil Mwotta
