= Puppet People =

Television series

Puppet People is a children's television series produced from 1973 to 1975 at CFCF-TV in Montreal, Quebec, and telecast on most CTV affiliates throughout Canada. It was hosted by the ventriloquist Jerry Layne who worked with his "friends" Lester and Herbie, puppets created for the show by Don Keller, who was a CFCF staff member who designed sets but originally was a ventriloquist in Montreal area. These puppets had a movable lip as opposed to moveable chin in classical puppet design.

Puppet People combined pre-taped comedy sketches with a cast of full-size figures. These sketches were played into a game show with children answering questions based on the sketches.

Before the show the studio audience was given kazoos and they played the theme song which ended with “Puppet People. Puppet People. Puppet People. Yeah!” A boy contestant was always matched with a girl contestant.

The series was the first production for the producer/director Sidney M. Cohen.

The Lester puppet once appeared on an episode of The Love Boat.
