= Indushree Raveendra =

- Born: 16 February 1986 (age 40)
- Origin: Bangaluru, India
- Genres: Ventriloquist, Experimentalist
- Occupation: Ventriloquism
- Years active: 1994-Present
- Website: indushreeraveendra.com

Indushree Raveendra (born 16 February 1986) is an Indian ventriloquist, impressionist and experimentalist. She was also a contestant on India's Got Talent and Entertainment Ke Liye Kuch Bhi Karega. She is also known for coming in That's My Job as a guest.

== Early life ==
Indushree's interest in ventriloquism began after buying a monkey puppet for Rs.200 at a magic convention.

== Education ==
In 2008, Indushree graduated in BFA (Bachelor of Fine Arts-Painting) from chitra kala parishath college of fine arts Karnataka. Following this in 2013, she completed her M.S. in Communication (Master of Science in Communication) from Presidency College.

== Career ==
Indushree got her first appearance on national television show Entertainment Ke Liye Kuch Bhi Karega, where she finished as the first runner-up. Indushree was also a contestant of India's Got Talent Season 5, where she reached the semi-finals. She has performed 68 live shows on Zee Kannada named Dinku Duniya and Filter Coffee with Dinku.

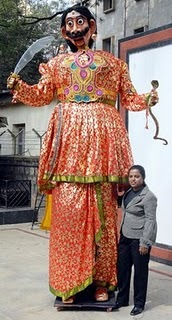
Indushree Raveendra performs with ten foot tall Mahishusura doll on the festival of Dussehra at Mysore.

In 2010, on the festival of Dussehra Indushree performed an act with a 10 feet tall puppet called Mahishasura.

== Awards ==
Indushree received the First Ladies Award from President of India in 2018. She has five Limca Book of Records for:

- The first female ventriloquist of India
- The first to do triple dummy acts
- The first to do four dummy acts
- For performing with the tallest talking doll (10-ft tall Mahishasura at the Mysuru Dasara)
- For performing most number of live ventriloquy shows (68).

She has also won the Young Achievers Award, the Global Shapers Award, along with the Indira Priyadarshini Vrikshamitra Awards.

== Puppets ==
This is a list of character names of the puppets that indushree uses during her shows:

- Dinku - Dinku has played the roles of politicians and actors, Manmohan Singh, Lalu Prasad Yadav, and Rakhi Sawant.
- Grandpa (Venkat or Venki) - Grandpa talks humorously about the concept of marriage and happy life.
