= Aaron Kirunda =

Ugandan social entrepreneur (born 1985)

- Born: 16 June 1985 (age 41); Jinja, Uganda
- Citizenship: Uganda
- Education: Makerere University, London School of Economics
- Occupation: Social Entrepreneur
- Years active: 2004–present
- Known for: empowering people

Aaron Kirunda (born 16 June 1985) is a Ugandan social entrepreneur and public figure. He is the chairperson of the African Spelling Bee and he is the co-founder and Chief Executive of enjuba where he dedicates his work to empowering people to reach their full potential through education. enjuba runs the National Spelling Bee in Uganda, a catalytic program that reaches millions of pupils in primary schools, helping them improve their literacy, develop 21st century skills. enjuba also publishes children's books and conducts teacher training programs.

== Background and education ==
Aaron was born in Jinja District and he attended Katira Primary School and Kasokoso Trading Centre Primary School before joining Kakira High School, for his O-Levels and Muljibhai Madhvani College, Wairaka for his A-Levels where he emerged the best student in Jinja District. In 2004, he got a government scholarship to Makerere University to study a Bachelor of Mass Communication. He graduated in 2008 with Honors. He spent most of his after school time engaging with youths on leadership, community activism, especially for the Children in Northern Uganda during the LRA War, mostly through GuluWalk and others, empowering entrepreneurs to produce quality products and designing communication materials for the Ugandan Government, Rwandan Government and World Bank funded projects. In 2009, he worked with others to develop radio programs for a university radio station to enable university students to make the most important decisions of their lives. He later moved to Kiwoko – Nakaseke District to start and manage Musana Fm, a community Radio station aimed at creating community transformation. While here, he designed radio programs that gave people hope and inspired several to start income generating activities, to go back to school, and take practical steps towards living better lives. He spearheaded planting of over 20,000 trees in the community as well as using the radio as a platform to engage and educate people on financial inclusion, helping people learn to use of their mobile phones as a tool for not just money transfers but also savings. He later launched enjuba Credit, a financial service company that helps individuals access emergency funding and for high growth entrepreneurs to get funding and business growth support for their businesses. In 2013, he was awarded a Commonwealth Scholarship to study social policy and business model innovation at the base of the pyramid at the London School of Economics.

He also runs the enjuba National Spelling Bee in Uganda and is the Chairperson of the African Spelling Bee, a continent-wide annual spelling competition for children with the aim of improving literacy, unlocking children's imagination and developing key life skills such as confidence, teamwork, critical thinking and presentation. Aaron is a receiver of a Positive Inspiration Award from YALDA (Youth Alliance for Leadership and Development in Africa). He was recognized as one of the 101 Young African Leaders at the 5th African Business Leaders Forum. He is a winner of the Global Young Social Entrepreneurs Competition, 2007 and a finalist for Young Achievers Award, 2010. Aaron is also an MIT GSW Fellow, an LSE Programme for African Leadership Fellow, an Acumen East African Fellow for 2016 and was recently nominated for the New Vision 40 under 40 awards.

== Community activism ==
Aaron has served in the following positions:

- Secretary General of the United Nations Youth Association of Uganda (UNYU).
- Regional Coordinator, Global Demos, Uganda.
- Project Director, Empower, a community organisation that teaches ICT skills to impoverished young people.
- Co-founder and Chief Executive, enjuba a social company that leverages innovative tools to empower people to reach their full potential through investing in High Growth Enterprises and empowering children improve their literacy and develop key life skills through a spelling bee.
