= Henry Cockton =

English writer

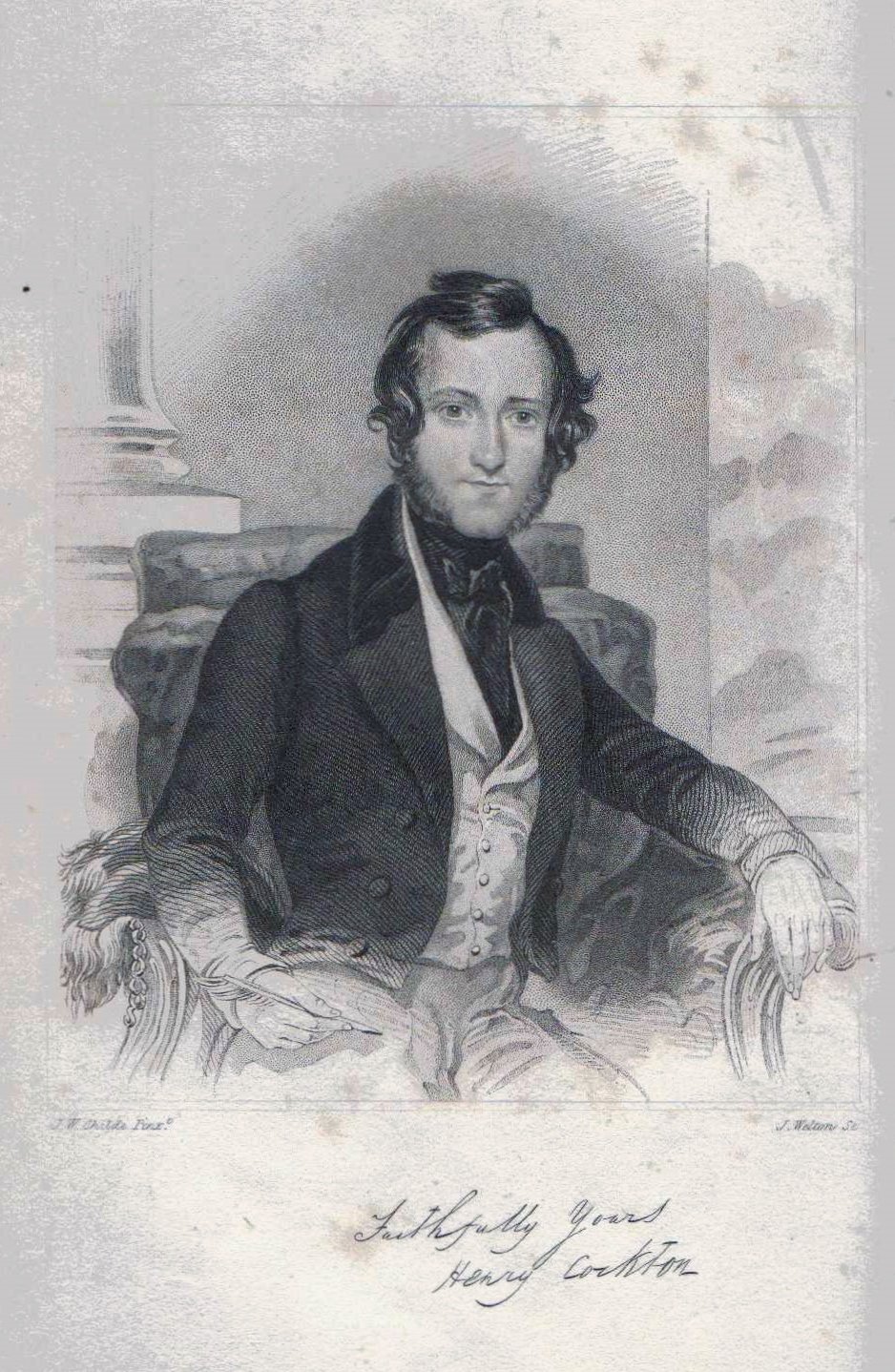
- Engraving of Henry Cockton from a portrait by James Warren Childe published as a frontispiece to his third novel George St. George Julian The Prince.
- Born: 7 December 1807; Shoreditch, London, England
- Died: 26 June 1853; Bury St. Edmunds, Suffolk, England
- Resting place: Bury St. Edmunds
- Occupations: Novelist, Innkeeper
- Spouse: Ann Howes (m. 1837)
- Children: Eleanor Anne Cockton, Edward Stanley Cockton
- Writing career
- Years active: 1839–1853

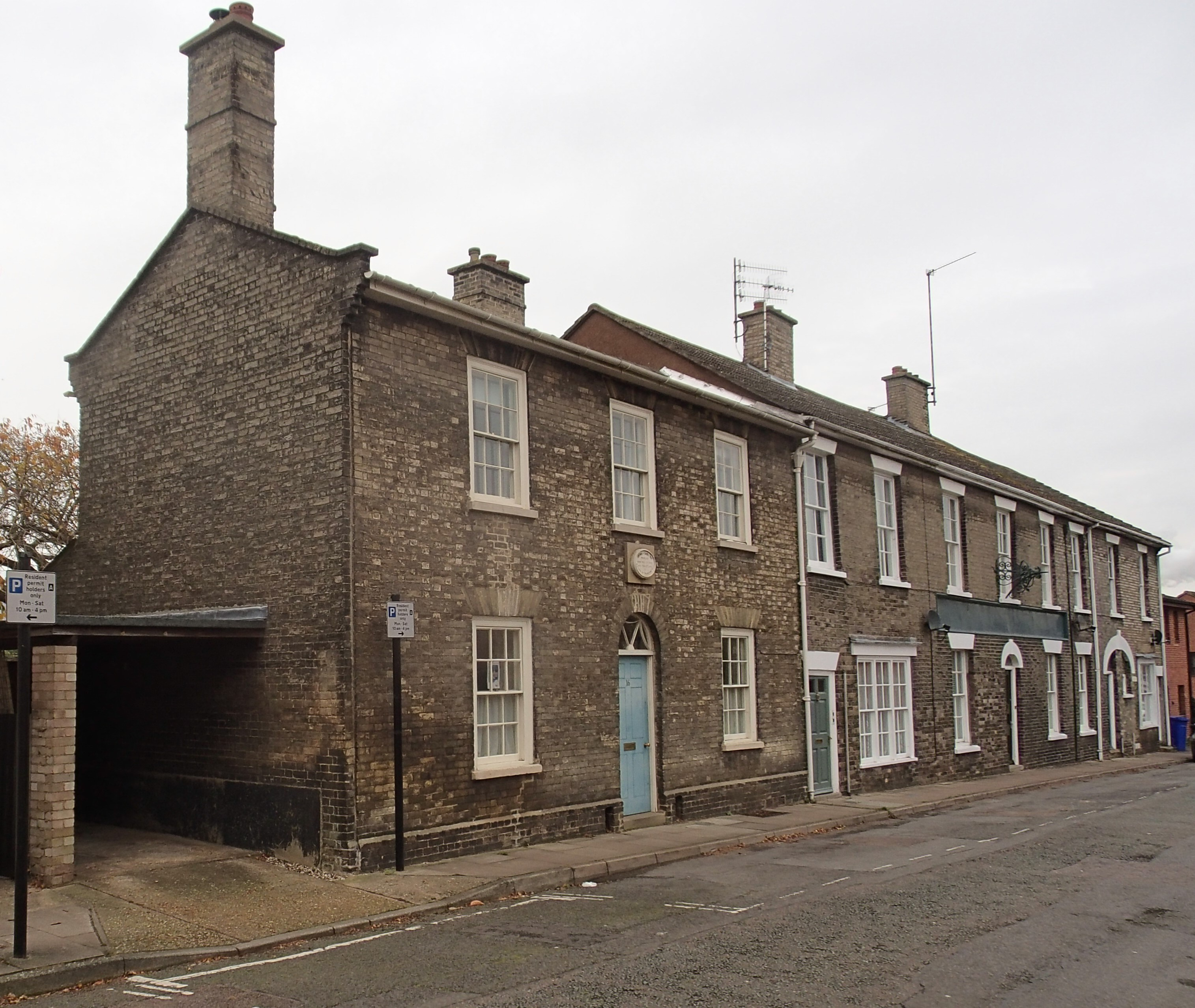
Range of buildings in Long Brackland, Bury St. Edmunds, including his mother in law's house, where he spent the final years of his life (foreground) and the former Seven Stars Inn which he ran between 1846 and 1849.

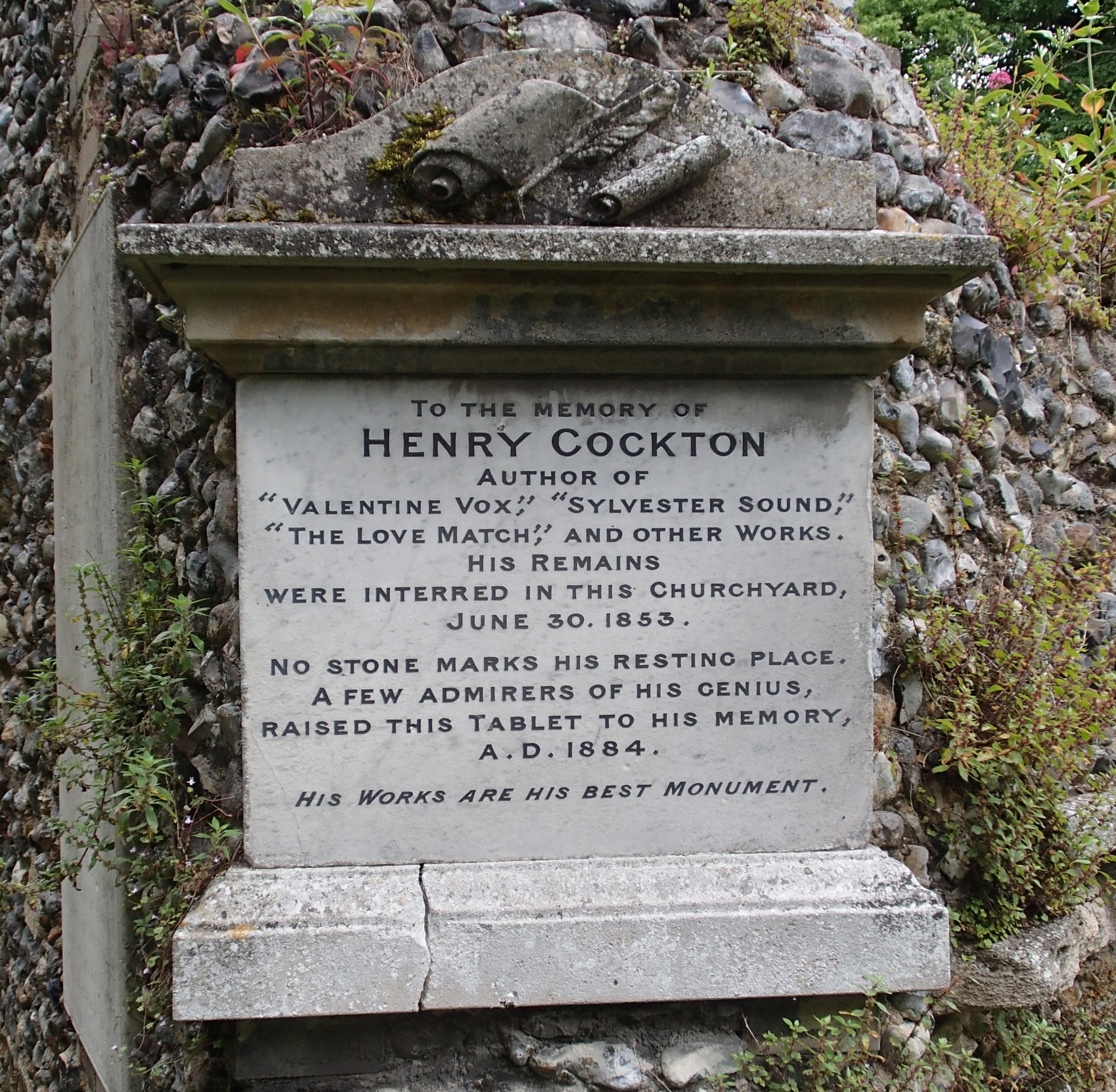
Memorial plaque to Henry Cockton on the wall of the Charnel House in the Great Churchyard in Bury St. Edmunds.

Henry Cockton (7 December 1807 – 26 June 1853) was an English novelist, remembered primarily for The Life and Adventures of Valentine Vox, the Ventriloquist (1839–40).

Henry Cockton was born in George Yard, Shoreditch, London, the third of eight children of William and Mary Cockton. His father may have been a weaver. Nothing is known about his childhood or education; all that can be ascertained about his early life is that he spent some years employed in a house of business (possibly as a draper's assistant) in Bury St. Edmunds in Suffolk. Here, on 9 May 1837, he married Ann Howes in St. James's Church (now the Cathedral). Ann was the daughter of Eleanor Howes, a widow who owned The Seven Stars Inn in Long Brackland, a street in that town. Henry and Ann had a daughter, Eleanor Anne, and a son, Edward Stanley, born in Bury St. Edmunds on 20 December 1839 and 11 December 1841.

In 1839 Henry Cockton commenced writing The Life and Adventures of Valentine Vox the Ventriloquist. Published by Robert Tyas of London, in the monthly serial format, popularised by Charles Dickens, it was an immediate success, enjoying great popularity and acclaim. Illustrations by Thomas Onwhyn were a prominent feature of this, and most of Henry Cockton's later novels. The first three chapters are set 'in one of the most ancient and populous boroughs in the county of Suffolk', a thinly disguised Bury St. Edmunds. Valentine Vox teaches himself ventriloquism after seeing a performer in a local tavern, then uses his skills to create mayhem and mischief. Fearing this will lead him into trouble, his family send him to stay with his uncle Grimwood Goodman in London. This provides unlimited opportunities to perform pranks, such as disrupting political meetings, theatrical performances, educational lectures and social events. Valentine develops a close friendship with Grimwood. Fearing that Grimwood will re-write his will in Valentine's favour, unscrupulous relatives have Grimwood confined in a private lunatic asylum, where he undergoes many horrific experiences. Eventually Valentine finds Grimwood, and liberates him, not by using ventriloquism, but by paying for his release. At the novel's conclusion, Valentine marries the love interest, Louise Raven, and abandons ventriloquism. Valentine's activities as a ventriloquist are quite incredible, showing an impossible, almost super-human level of ability: by the end of the book he has duped literally hundreds of people from all walks of life in all situations, not one of whom ever suspects him. Yet the novel contains no technical information about ventriloquism, and it is doubtful if the author had any practical knowledge of the subject. The completed work contained a preface by Henry Cockton, outlining the scandal of private lunatic asylums. As with Charles Dickens in Oliver Twist and Nicholas Nickleby, he clearly intended to draw attention to a social issue about which he felt strongly.

Valentine Vox was lauded as one of the most amusing and entertaining works of the year, rivalling the popularity of Dickens's novels. Between 1853 and 1902 over 400,000 copies were published in the UK. It even spawned an imitation: Thomas Peckett Prest wrote a plagiarism, The Adventures of Valentine Vaux, or, the Tricks of a Ventriloquist (1840), using the pseudonym Timothy Portwine. Valentine Vox was last printed in 1920. While modern readers will probably gain little from the humour, which consists of one joke, told with repetition, it contains some vividly observed scenes of contemporary London life, which can be read as sources of social history.

The success of Valentine Vox prompted Richard Bentley to commission Henry Cockton to write Stanley Thorn (1841) for Bentley's Miscellany. This was not an original composition, but a work initiated by Richard Barham in which several authors had been asked to collaborate in a work on the theme of The Rake's Progress, about the downfall of a wealthy young man of property. Henry Cockton was given the manuscripts to adapt and complete, which he did, adding an unconvincing happy ending in place of the tragic end that was originally envisioned.

Henry Cockton does not seem to have made much money from novel-writing, as the 1841 census showed him and his family as resident in 165 Blackfriars Road, Southwark, where they were lodgers of Maria Dowie, a widowed dressmaker.

Henry Cockton's third novel, George St. George Julian, the Prince was intended to expose financial corruption, fraud and forgery. In the course of his misadventures the eponymous hero encounters several rogues and cheats, including the historical Gregor MacGregor, the self-styled Cazique of Poyais. The publisher collapsed before Henry Cockton had received any payment for George St. George Julian, and he was effectively bankrupted, being imprisoned for debt, but being released after declaring himself an insolvent debtor.

Three further novels followed. The Sisters: Or England and France (1843), originally serialised in the Illustrated London News, set in Regency England, tells the stories of Caroline and Lucrece, whose lives diverge as a result of their marriages. Sylvester Sound the Somnambulist (1844), was a comic tale about a persistent sleepwalker, who unknowingly performs many exploits in this state. A comic novel, it enjoyed some success, selling over 40,000 copies, and remaining in print until 1921. The Love Match (1845), about a general's daughter who marries a stable hand, is of some interest for descriptions of the contemporary Newmarket horse-racing community: this featured a terse message announcing it would probably be the author's last book.

His failure to make a financial profit from writing was probably the primary reason for his change of career, and he returned to Bury St. Edmunds to run The Seven Stars for his mother-in-law. Here he unwisely stood surety for the sum of £200 for his brother, Edward, only to lose the money when Edward fled to Australia. He then embarked on a malting speculation, buying large quantities of the product, possibly for re-sale or to start a business, but he was largely ignorant of the malt trade, and his scheme collapsed, leaving him financially ruined.

He abandoned innkeeping, and, with his family, moved into his mother-in-law's house, where he wrote three further novels, none of which enjoyed great success. The Steward: a Romance of Real Life (1850), describes the downfall of George Croly, a Suffolk country gentleman, who is categorically lambasted as an evil, duplicitous person. An angry vitriolic work, The Steward possibly reflects the author's own feelings at the time. Lady Felicia (1852), a Cinderella inspired story about a shop assistant who marries a titled lady, is of some interest for its setting in Sudbury in Suffolk, against a background of local political corruption, a theme which had featured in the Pickwick Papers. Percy Effingham, or the germ of the world's esteem (1853), the story of an amiable and intelligent, but naive young man, who loses 'the world's esteem' (in this case, money and financial success), may have reflected the author's feelings about his own life, being finished only a few days before his death, on 26 June 1853. Four days later he was buried in an unmarked grave in the town churchyard of Bury St. Edmunds. There were no obituary notices.

Soon after his death his widow petitioned the Royal Literary Fund for financial assistance, in a detailed account of his life and misfortunes. Never published, this makes sad reading. She received £25.

In 1856 The Bury And Norwich Post published a further appeal for his family. In 1884 some admirers raised a tablet in his memory on the wall of the abbey's ruined charnel house in the town churchyard.

The name Valentine Vox has been adopted as a stage name by Jack Riley, a popular performer of and author about ventriloquism, and used as a title of a record album released by Chris Jagger in 1974.

== Works ==
- The Life and Adventures of Valentine Vox, the Ventriloquist (1840)
- Stanley Thorn (1840)
- The Prince: Or George St. George Julian (1841), later published as The Life and Adventures of George St. Julian, the Prince of Swindlers
- The Sisters: Or England and France: A Romance of Real Life (1843), revised as The Sisters: Or the Fatal Marriages (1851)
- Sylvester Sound the Somnambulist (1844)
- The Love Match (1845)
- The Steward: A Romance of Real Life (1850)
- Lady Felicia: A Novel (1852)
- Percy Effingham: Or the Germ of the World's Esteem (1853)
