= Kawowo Sports =

- Website type: Sports
- Owner: Owino Solutions Limited
- Creator: Joseph Owino
- Editor: Franklin Kaweru
- Website: www.kawowo.com
- Commercial: Yes
- Registration: Optional
- Launched: September 1, 2011; 15 years ago
- Current status: Online

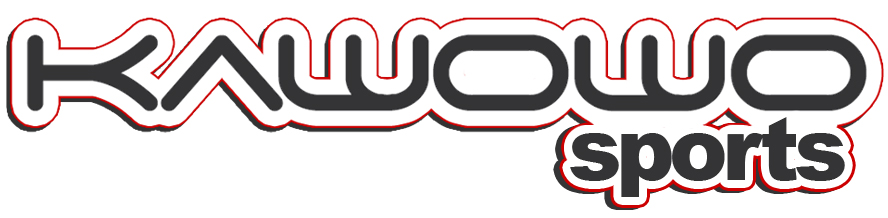
Former logo of Kawowo Sports

Kawowo Sports is an East African sports website based in Kampala, Uganda, that publishes digital sports content with a focus on local and regional information. It was founded by Joseph Owino in September 2011.

== Awards ==
In 2017, kawowo.com was awarded as the sports website of the year by the Sports Journalists Association of Uganda. At the same event, Kawowo Sports' photographer, John Batanudde, was named photographer of the year.
