= Ivan Bwowe =

Ugandan lawyer (born 1991)

- Born: 27 April 1991 (age 35); Kyotera
- Education: Makerere University (Bachelors of Law); University of Iceland (Post Graduate Diploma in Gender and Equality Studies); Law Development Centre (Post Graduate Diploma in Legal Practice)
- Occupations: Lawyer, student leader and politician
- Years active: 2013– present
- Known for: Lawyer, Politics, Guild President

Bwowe Ivan (born 27 April 1991), is a Ugandan politician, lawyer who served as the 80th Makerere University Guild President 2014 to 2015. He is known for his negotiations with President Museveni that resulted into increase in the lecturers pay, challenging tuition increments and unfair policies which negatively impacted students welfare.

== Early life and Education Background ==
Bwowe was born to Richard Bwowe Buwembo & Vannie Tibaggwa. He schooled from St. Charles Lwanga Kalisizo, St. Andrew Matale Secondary School for UCE, Seeta High School for UACE. He served in a number of leadership positions being the Headboy in primary school, O-level and A-Level. At the university, he served as chief fresher of Might Lumumba Hall and Chief Fresher of Makerere University Private Students’ Association. He equally served on the executive of Uganda Young democrats Makerere Chapter in a number of positions the highest being Deputy Speaker. He was legal Advisor in Baganda Nkobazambogo Makerere Chapter. (Mak Sharks) and Represented Uganda in the All Africa 2014 FASU Games in swimming. Bwowe received his Bachelor of Laws from Makerere University as well as a Post Graduate Diploma in Legal Practice from Law Development Centre and received a Post Graduate Diploma in Gender & Equality from University of Iceland

== Career ==
In March 2014, Bwowe was voted as a student leader for Makerere University 2014–2015 becoming the first independent candidate to win the guild presidency since the return of multiparty dispensation in Uganda in 1995. He succeeded Anna Ebaju Adeke. He has served as a member of Makerere University Council, various committees of the university council which include, Finance Committee, Estate and Works and the University Senate.

In 2016, he contested for the Member of Parliament seat for Buyamba Constituency He ran as an independent Bwowe was admitted to the Ugandan Bar and currently works with Kiwanuka, Kanyago & Co Advocates. He is also a Research Fellow at the Great Lakes Institute for Strategic Studies. He is serving as a Committee member on Legal & Disciplinary Committee of the Federation of Africa University Sports, Young ITA (Institute of Transnational Arbitration), Young ICSID(International Centre for Settlement of Investments Disputes) of the World Bank as well as a member of Young Arbitrators Forum of the International Chamber of Commerce (ICC YAF). Bwowe currently is working on a project to combat trafficking of women and girls from Uganda to the middle East disguised as labour externalization. He received an honorary mention from the GRO-GEST which is under the Auspice of UNESCO for his work on the project.

== Cases involved ==
- Bwowe Ivan vs Makerere University Miscellaneous Application No. 252 of 2013. Bwowe while in 2nd year of his law school, led his fellow students and challenged his suspension out of the university by way of judicial review in the High Court. He succeed and subsequently with others were reinstated in the university. The case has since become Locus classicus in Ugandan Jurisprudence on Administrative law and Judicial review.
- Bwowe Ivan vs Mandera "election petition" After the 2016 election, Bwowe challenged the election of Amos Mandera in election petition No.8 at Masaka High Court and succeeded. However, the decision was appealed in Election Petition Appeal No.91 of 2016 by Amos Mandera was allowed by the Court of Appeal.
- Bwowe Ivan vs Attorney General on labour externalization Infuriated by the human trafficking and abuse of human rights of Uganda's exported for labour in the middle east, Bwowe filed Misc. Cause No. 244 of 2019 at the High Court challenging The Employment (Recruitment of Ugandan Migrant Worker Abroad) Regulation. The case is ongoing and yet to be decided by Court.
- Bwowe Ivan vs Uganda Government on gazettement of Red Berets Ivan challenged the Notice by the minister of defense in charge of veterans and it was published in the Uganda gazette intended to legally bar wearing of the red beret particularly targeting members of people power movement led by Bobi Wine. The case is still ongoing before the high court.

== See also ==
- Robert Maseruka
- Biddemu Bazil Mwotta

== External References ==
- Bwowe Ivan Biography
- https://allafrica.com/stories/201910150301.html
