= Gharat Basle Saare =

Marathi-language short TV series

- Genre: Comedy
- Written by: Padhye Family
- Starring: See below
- Country of origin: India
- Original language: Marathi
- No. of episodes: 25

Production
- Camera setup: Multi-camera
- Running time: 22 minutes

Original release
- Network: Zee Marathi
- Release: 8 June – 10 July 2020

Gharat Basale Saare (transl. All sat at home) is an Indian Marathi language short series which aired on Zee Marathi during lockdown period. It was premiered from 8 June 2020 airing Monday to Friday and stopped on 10 July 2020 completing 25 episodes. In this show, puppetry was done by Padhye family with various dolls and puppets.

== Summary ==
Famous ventriloquist and puppeteer Ramdas Padhye and his family entertained with their art. Due to the lockdown, the other puppeteers are stuck at home with Ardhavatrao and Aavdabai. The Padhye family talks about ventriloquism and puppetry, all the while explaining and narrating various stories using the dolls.
