= Mimicry Srinivos =

Mimicry Srinivas
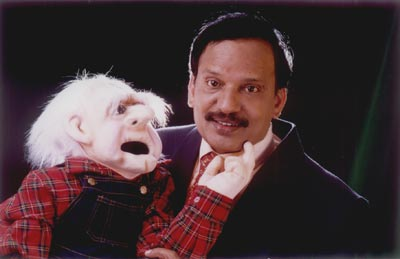

Background information
- Born: Sreenivas Chinchapattana Gomatham; 25 December 1961 (age 64)
- Genres: Ventriloquist, Mimic
- Occupations: Mimicry, Ventriloquism
- Years active: 1977–present

Mimicry Srinivos is an impressionist, ventriloquist and sound illusionist from India. He has performed in India and around the world.

He is a disciple of mimic Padmashri Dr. Nerella Venumadhav and learned ventriloquism from Prof. M.M. Roy of Chennai, India and later he graduated in ventriloquism from Mahers institute of ventriloquists, Colorado, US. He is a member of " North American Association of Ventriloquists". He is also known as "Mimikry Srinivas, " Mimicry Sreenivas, "Mimicry Srinivas" "Mimicry Seenu" and "Mimicry Srinivos".

== Early life ==
Sreenivos was born in a small village called Kesamudram in Warangal district of Telangana state in 1961. As a child he was impressed by Dr. Nerella Venumadhav's performance arranged at Mahabubabad on the occasion of Subhas Chandrabose birth anniversary organized by journalist Ubeid on 23rd January 1971 and started practising imitation of various voices. He got an opportunity to learn more and improve his skills when his family moved to Warangal which is the hometown of renowned artist Dr. Venumadhav. Soon he became a favorite disciple of Dr. Venumadhav. He started performing on stage when he was 15 years old and quickly became a popular artist with his new and bold experiments in mimicry and ventriloquism. He is also a graphic artist and as a teenager, he ran his own graphic art business 'Navata Arts' in Warangal during the late 70s.

== Education ==
He graduated with 'Bachelor of Arts' from Arts and Science College (affiliated to Kakatiya University), Warangal, Telangana state, India in the year 1982.

== Career ==
Srinivos is the first Indian mimic to perform ventriloquism and sound illusion.

Srinivos has enthralled audiences all over India. He has performed and entertained worldwide.

Srinivos created "Dhwanyavadhaanam", a unique feat in the world history of mimicry in the year 1990, and performed it the first time in the Tyagaraya gana Sabha auditorium in Hyderabad. He was awarded the title Dhwanyavadhaana Samrat.

He set a world record by performing a 32-hour nonstop mimicry show in 1990 at Tyagaraja Ganasabha auditorium in Hyderabad. It was organized by the Hyderabad Film & Cultural Circle.

His performances include 'Mimicry Jugalbandi' and 'Group Mimicry' and in ventriloquism like Voice Throwing, Sound Perspective, Sound in Liquid, Distant Ventriloquism, Caricature Illusion, Close-up Sound Illusion, Point-blank Sound Illusion, etc. He was hired by Indian Railways as a cultural representative and he worked for 30 years and retired in the year 2021 from South Central Railways, Hyderabad, India. He appears very often on various Telugu television channels. Srinivos performs in English, Hindi, Urdu, Tamil, and Telugu.

== Titles and awards ==
He has received various titles and awards over the past 38 years.
