= The Great Lester =

Polish ventriloquist (1878-1956)

- Born: Maryan Czajkowski; 8 September 1878; Poland
- Died: 14 July 1956 (aged 77); United States
- Occupation: vaudeville ventriloquist

Notes
- He carved his dummy Frank Byron Jr. when he was young.

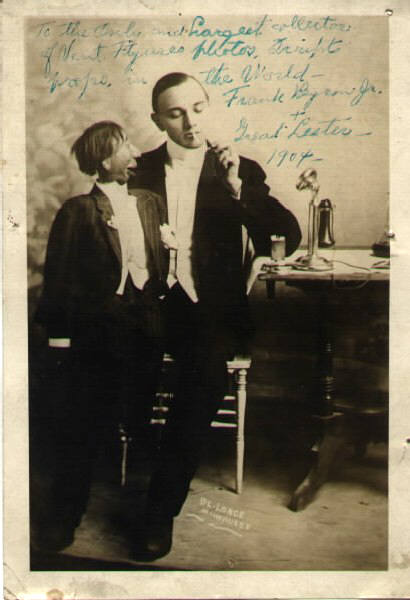
The Great Lester with Frank Byron Jr. on his knee, c. 1904

Harry Lester (born Maryan Czajkowski; 8 September 1878 – 14 July 1956), best known by his stage name The Great Lester, was a Polish-American seminal vaudeville ventriloquist.

== Ventriloquist act ==
Lester claimed to have carved his dummy, Frank Byron Jr., himself when he was young. Coronet cited Frank Marshall of Chicago as his carver. The most likely provenance of Frank Byron Jr., however, indicates that he came from the Chicago workshop of Theo Mack & Son, probably a number of years before Frank Marshall was employed there.

Called the "Grandfather of Modern-Day Ventriloquism", Lester claimed to be the first to drink while his dummy spoke; however, Joe Laurie notes that this trick was first performed in 1821, long before Lester was born.

One of Lester's most noted acts was a bit where he called up Heaven and Hell in search of his sister. He was also the first ventriloquist to walk among the audience while his dummy whistled.

== Legacy ==
Lester was also a noted teacher of the art of ventriloquism, having developed a rigorous program of breathing and speech articulation exercises. Students were encouraged to make tape recordings of their sessions with Lester and, as a result, there are many examples of his course to be heard and a number of student recordings have been made available commercially. Edgar Bergen, one of the most famous ventriloquists of all time, was one of the Great Lester's pupils.

Lester's main figure, Frank Byron Jr., now resides at Vent Haven Museum in Fort Mitchell, Kentucky.
