= Jerry Layne (ventriloquist) =

Canadian ventriloquist (1938–2018)

Jerry Layne (1938 - June 27, 2018) was the ventriloquist host of Puppet People, a TV series produced from 1973 to 1975 at CFCF-TV in Montreal and telecast on most CTV television network stations. He worked with his "friends" Lester and Herbie, puppets created for the show.

Layne grew up in Brooklyn, NY during a time when ventriloquist acts were popular entertainment in theaters and clubs. He became interested in ventriloquism as a child and by age 14 was a student of ventriloquist Paul Winchell.

He went on to work in television production and eventually became a full-time ventriloquist performing on cruise ships and other entertainment venues. In 1978, he performed for six months at the Knott's Berry Farm amusement park. He also became known as builder of ventriloquist dummies.
