= Biddemu Bazil Mwotta =

Ugandan politician and entrepreneur

- Born: March 28, 1994 (age 32); Uganda
- Education: Makerere University
- Occupations: Politician, agriculture enthusiast, social entrepreneur
- Known for: Politics and Agriculture

Biddemu Bazil Mwotta is a Ugandan Agriculture Enthusiast, Social entrepreneur, politician, and teacher. Bazil is the Founder and Chief Executive Officer of AgroDuuka Uganda Limited. He was the 82nd Guild president of Makerere University. The Guild Representative Council is the topmost student leadership body at Makerere University. On the 15th of January, 2019, the Chancellor of Makerere University bestowed upon Mwotta a Bachelor of Arts with Education degree, having completed his studies at the academic institution.

== Early life and education ==
Biddemu Bazil Mwotta was born on 28 March 1994, at Mengo Hospital in Kampala. He was born to Nakisitu Florence Biddemu; his mother; a Muganda of the 'Ffumbe' Clan and Bazil Biddemu Muwanga; his father; a Muganda of the 'Njovu' clan. The couple married at Nkozi Parish in Mpigi, Central Uganda.

Mwotta was raised in Kamwokya, one of the ghettos in Kampala. However, because of the nature of his mothers' job; a farmer, he spent most of his time in Katiiti, Kituntu Division, Mpigi District helping her on the farm.

Mwotta was raised in a staunch Catholic family. He served as an Altar Boy at Holy Trinity Church Kamwokya for the better part of his childhood.

Mwotta attended Kitante Primary School (2001-2007), St. Joseph's Seminary Nyenga (2008-2010), and Kasubi Senior Secondary School (2011- 2013) for his Uganda Certificate of Education(2008-2011) and Uganda Advanced Certificate of Education (2012-2013). He attained a Certificate in Computer Applications from Makerere University in 2014. He graduated cum laude with a Bachelor of Arts with Education degree from Makerere University Kampala.

== Career ==
Bazil Mwota was the 82nd Guild president of Makerere University. The Guild Representative Council is the topmost student leadership body at Makerere University. He was also elected the leader of the Baganda Nkobazambogo Caucus in the Guild Representative Council (2015-2016).

=== Agriculture ===
Having grown up in a predominantly farming community Katiiti, Mpigi District, Mawokota, Mwotta interfaced directly how his mother, as well as other farmers, were being exploited by middlemen who bought from them farm produce for cheap and sold to other buyers at exorbitant prices. This gradually affected the livelihoods of these farmers whose sole source of income was and still is agriculture. In the bid to address this challenge, Mwotta started up AgroDuuka, a robust agricultural produce supply chain management software, supported by the Global Position System for Mobile communication that directly connects smallholder rural farmers to buyers in the market at a low cost via SMS and the internet, before and after harvest.

The AgroDuuka software has connected farmers across Uganda to potential buyers and has also been nominated in various awards like the Queen's Young Leaders Award in 2018

== See also ==
- Robert Maseruka
- Ivan Bwowe
