= Kenny Warren =

American ventriloquist (born 1946)

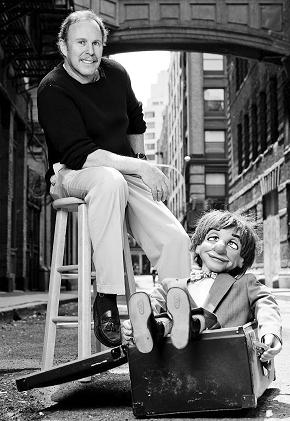
- Born: Kenneth Warren Deutscher; April 1, 1946 (age 79); Brooklyn, New York
- Education: B.A. speech; M.A. theatre; M.S. special education
- Alma mater: College of Staten Island
- Occupations: Ventriloquist; comedian; author
- Notable work: Book – The Revival of Ventriloquism in America
- Website: www.kennywarren.com

Kenny Warren (born April 1, 1946) is an American ventriloquist, comedian, and author. He has appeared on television shows such as What's My Line? and To Tell the Truth and also has performed with comedians such as Jerry Seinfeld and Rodney Dangerfield.

== Early life and education ==
Warren grew up in Brooklyn, New York and was influenced at the age of 12 by The Paul Winchell Show. He would regularly watch the show in person at the ABC Studios in New York in the late 1950s. In addition to him being influential, Paul Winchell was also the one who taught Warren ventriloquism. Warren's first performances took place at hospitals and nursing homes where his audiences inspired him to continue performing.

Warren attended the University of Mississippi where in 1970 he wrote a master thesis on the art of ventriloquism. During his time at the university, he became friends with W.S. Berger, who is the founder and creator of the Vent Haven Museum. His thesis was also read by famed ventriloquist Edgar Bergen who later wrote "This is by far the most complete treatise on Ventriloquism I have ever read and thank you for the many nice things you said about me."

== Professional career ==
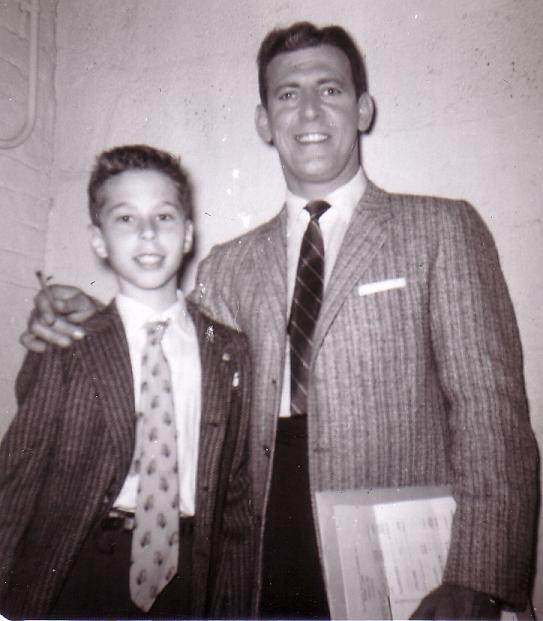
Kenny Warren as a child with Paul Winchell.

Warren has made numerous television appearances including on programs such as What's My Line? and To Tell the Truth in the early 1970s. He originally worked with a puppet named "Joey O’Leary" in the 1970s but has since added an additional puppet by the name of "Leroy Cool". Warren is one of the best-known opening acts for many of America's most famous comedic acts, including Jerry Seinfeld, Rosie O'Donnell, Bette Midler, David Brenner, Richard Lewis, Robert Klein, The Dixie Cups, Johnny Paycheck, Rodney Dangerfield, Andy Kaufman and Richard Pryor. He has also appeared in national television commercials for American Tourister Luggage (which was nominated for the Clio award), Reese's Crunchy, Long John Silver's Restaurants, Chewels Sugarless Gum, Reach Toothbrush and Bayer's Instant Throat Spray. In 2010 Warren appeared on NBC's Last Comic Standing.

=== Publications ===
In 2011, Warren published his 1970 thesis into a book that was released under the title "The Revival of Ventriloquism in America."
