= Saveen =

British ventriloquist (1914–1994)

Albert Saveen
- Born: Albert Edward Langford; 27 May 1914; Southwark, London, England
- Died: 14 April 1994 (aged 79); Worcester Park, Surrey, England
- Occupation: Ventriloquist
- Years active: 1940s–1980s

Albert Saveen (born Albert Edward Langford; 27 May 1914 – 14 April 1994), usually credited mononymously as Saveen, was a British ventriloquist who, with his puppet character Daisy May, was the first to have a national radio series on the BBC Light Programme.

== Biography ==
Born in Southwark, London, he worked for a printing company before being injured in a bomb explosion in the Second World War. While recuperating, and exercising using only one lung at a time, he developed a ventriloquism technique that produced a girlish voice, with which he entertained his fellow troops. He made a tiny wooden schoolgirl dummy, Daisy May, and was discovered by impresario Val Parnell.

He made his first BBC radio appearance in 1945, and in 1950 had his own regular show, Midday with Daisy May. He also made frequent appearances on television in the 1950s and 1960s. He used 14 different puppet characters in all, including a cockney boy dummy "Andy the Spiv", and incorporated into his act two dogs (one dummy and one real). The puppet dog used to say "Drop Dead!" in a very droll posh voice whenever Saveen spoke to him. At the end of the act, the puppets would be packed into a suitcase, and appeared to be heard arguing with each other as Saveen left the stage.

The act was often billed as "Daisy May assisted by Saveen". Daisy May had her own bank account and telephone number. Roy Hudd wrote that, on one occasion, he rang to speak to Saveen; "Daisy May" answered the phone and insisted that Hudd could not speak to Saveen, but that she would pass a message on for him to ring Hudd back.

Saveen later became a theatrical agent. He died in Worcester Park, Surrey, in 1994, aged 79.

"Daisy May" is identified as the origin of Royal Navy slang "Daisy" for a sailor named May.
