= Esther Kalenzi =

Ugandan social entrepreneur

- Born: Esther Kalenzi; Uganda
- Occupation: social entrepreneur
- Website: http://40daysover40smiles.org/

Esther Kalenzi is a Ugandan social entrepreneur and founder of 40 Days Over 40 Smiles Foundation, a charity organization that supports vulnerable children and helps them access quality education. She won the 2013 Young Achievers Award in the Heroes category.

== Early life ==
Esther is the last born of four children. She went to Nabisunsa Girls' Secondary School, Aga Khan High School and Uganda Christian University, where she graduated with a bachelor's degree in mass communication.

== Awards and recognition ==
- Commonwealth Point of Light Award for educating vulnerable children
- 2013 Heroes Young Achievers Award
