= Ardhavatrao =

Indian puppet

Ardhavatrao, also known as Mr. Crazy, is a puppet created in 1916 by Indian ventriloquist Yeshwant Keshav Padhye. Known for its comedic style, the character has been featured in performances for over a century. Ardhavatrao gained popularity through appearances on television, stage shows, and films, including appearances on India's national channel Doordarshan since 1972. The character has been performed in over 9,800 shows by the Padhye family, as well as on channels in over 25 countries, including Singapore, the US, and Hong Kong.

== Development ==
Ardhavatrao was created by Yeshwant Keshav Padhye, a ventriloquist, in mid-1916. Inspired by a British ventriloquist's performance in India, Padhye attempted to incorporate ventriloquism into his magic shows. He initially conceptualized the character on paper, naming him "Ardhavatrao", which means "half-mad" in Marathi, to reflect his comedic personality. Since there was a shortage of ventriloquial dummies in India at the time, he began performing wearing masks. Later, he imported a puppet from the Davenport Company in England, changing it to Indian attire and hairstyle to establish its distinctive appearance. For English-speaking audiences, the puppet was referred to as "Mr. Crazy."

Following Yeshwant Padhye's death in 1967, After Yashwant Padhye's death in 1967, his son Ramdas Padhye continued to work with the character, Over the years, the visual design of the Ardhavatrao largely consistent, with only minor changes in costumes and makeup.

== Appearances ==
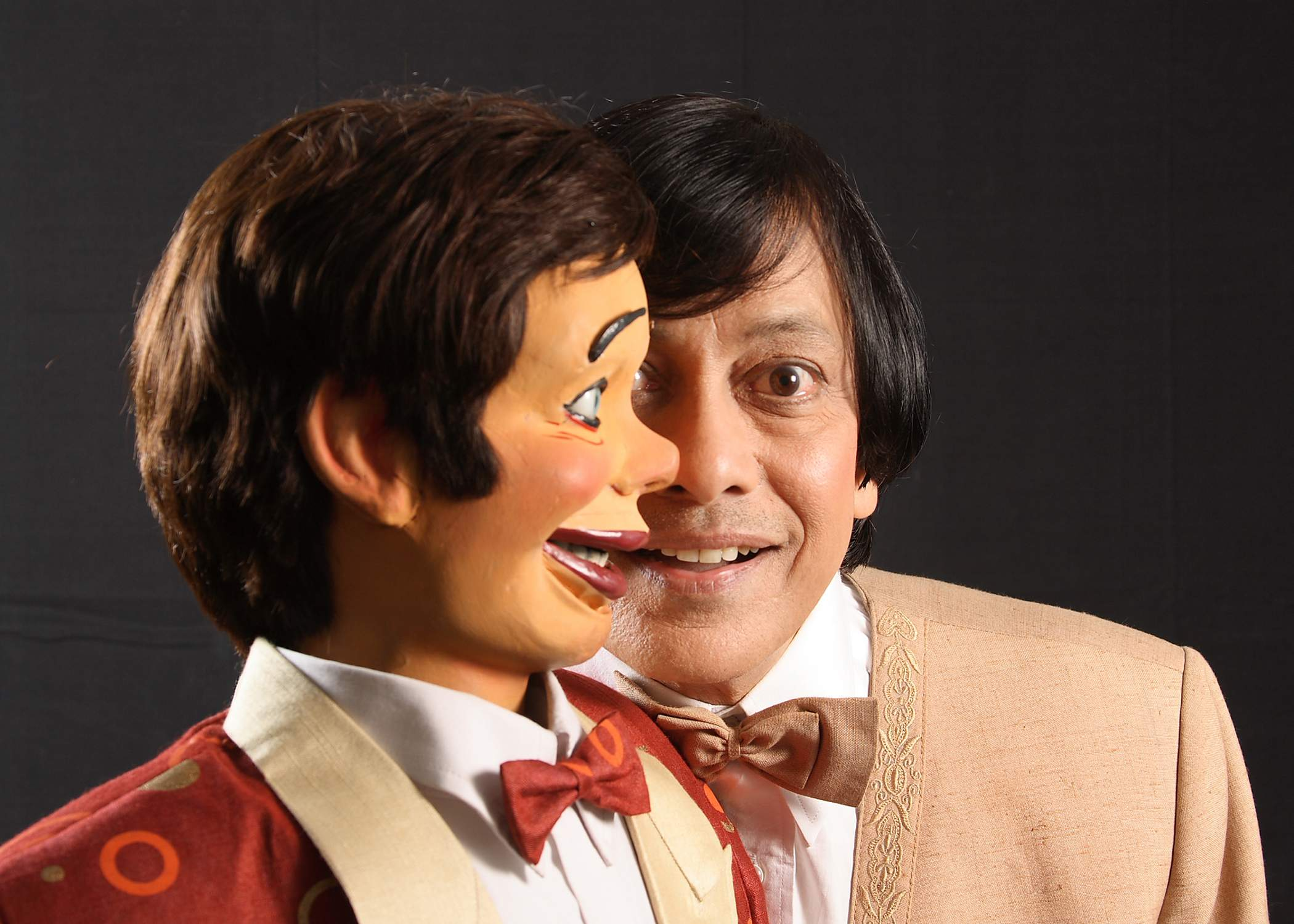
Ramdas Padhye with Ardhavatrao

Ardhavatrao gained widespread recognition through Ramdas Padhye's performances, particularly on Doordarshan starting in 1972, he first appeared in Hindi show Meri Bhi Suno.

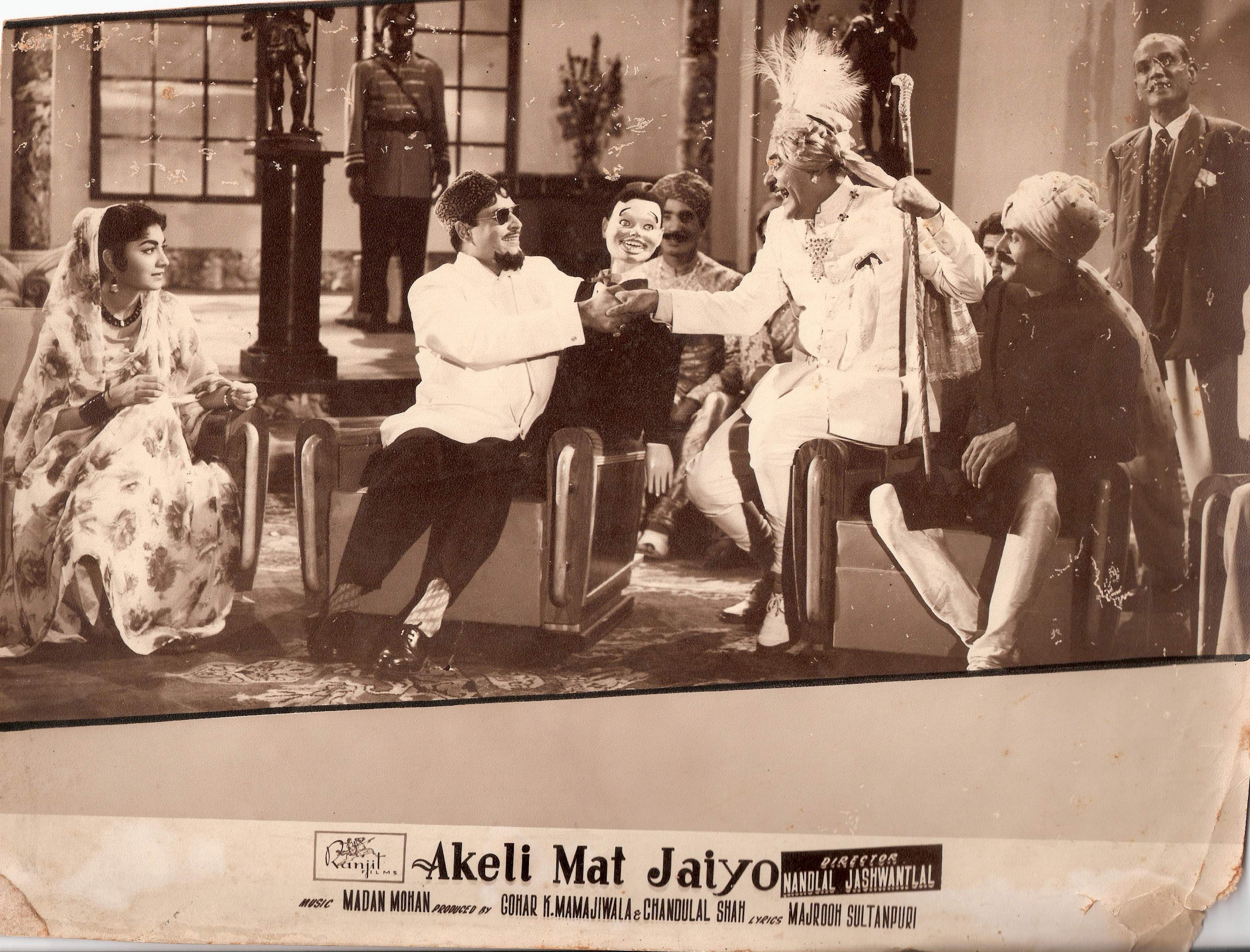
Ardhavatrao in Akeli Mat Jaiyo

The puppet appeared in Indian films, notably in the 1963 Hindi film Akeli Mat Jaiyo, where Ardhavatrao, operated by Yeshwant Padhye, shared the screen with actor Rajendra Kumar. It later featured in the 1983 film Mahan alongside Bollywood superstar Amitabh Bachchan.

Its appearance in the Lijjat Papad ad, shot in the 1980s, remains one of India's most memorable commercials. In 1993, Ardhavatrao was appeared in Mahesh Kothare's horror film Zapatlela.

In 2016, the Padhye family celebrated Ardhavatrao's centenary with global performances in 13 countries and a special show titled Ardhavatrao 100 Not Out on Zee Marathi. In 2020, Ardhavatrao was featured in the show Gharat Basale Saare.
