= Y. K. Padhye =

Yeshwant Keshav Padhye was the pioneering Indian Ventriloquist who started ventriloquism in India in the 1920s. He was also a puppeteer and maker.

== Early life ==
As a magician he performed magic shows in India. Eventually he brought puppets from England and then slowly started performing ventriloquism.

== Career ==
=== Magic ===
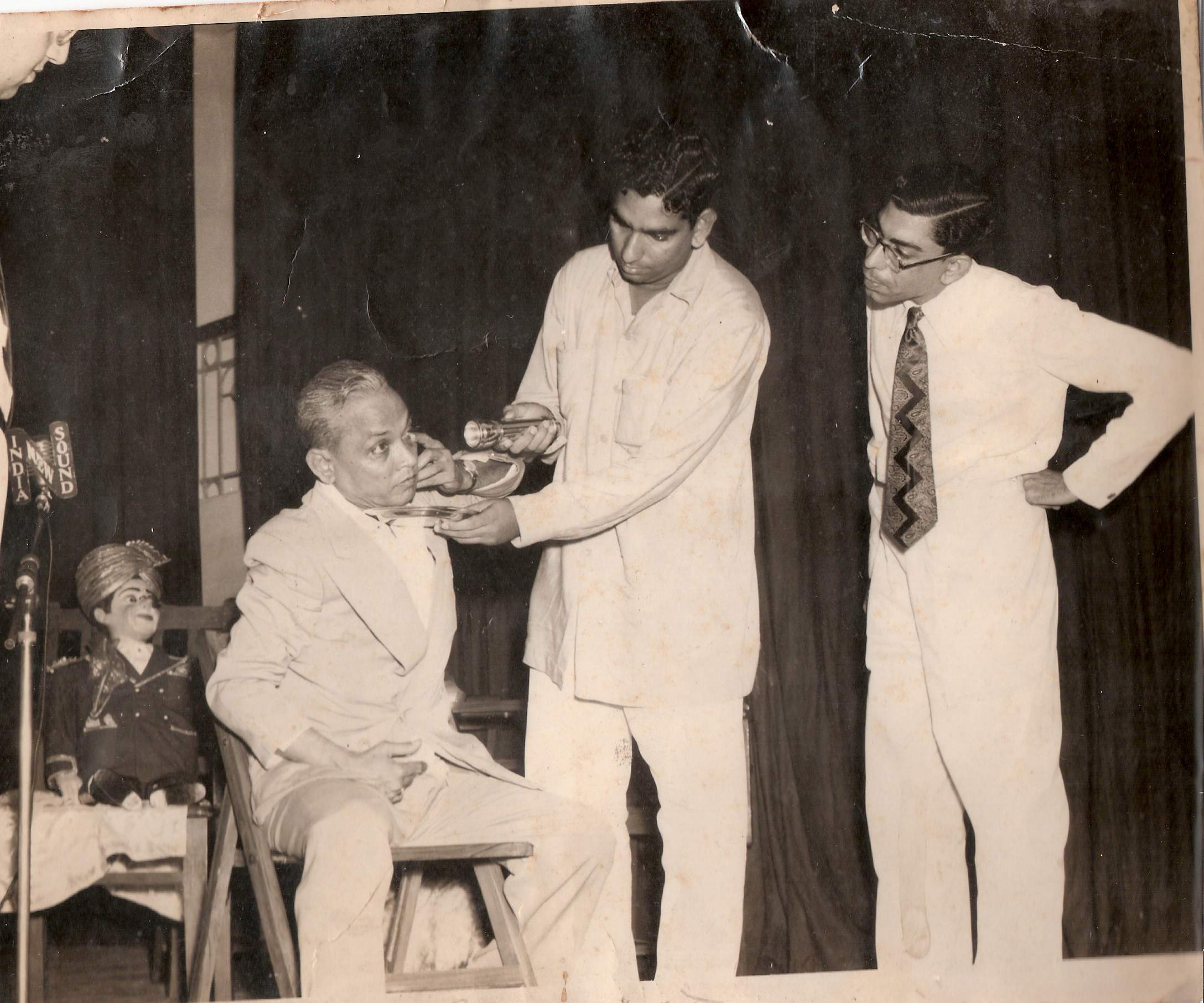
Y. K. Padhye performing Magic

Padhye started by performing magic shows at small functions when the entertainment industry was in its infancy. However he created a niche for himself when he started combining magic and puppetry. He brought the puppets from England to include in his shows, later gradually introducing ventriloquism, teaching himself from a book which he ordered from U.S.A. This excited audiences as they had never seen a lively ventriloquial puppet talk.

=== Puppets in films ===
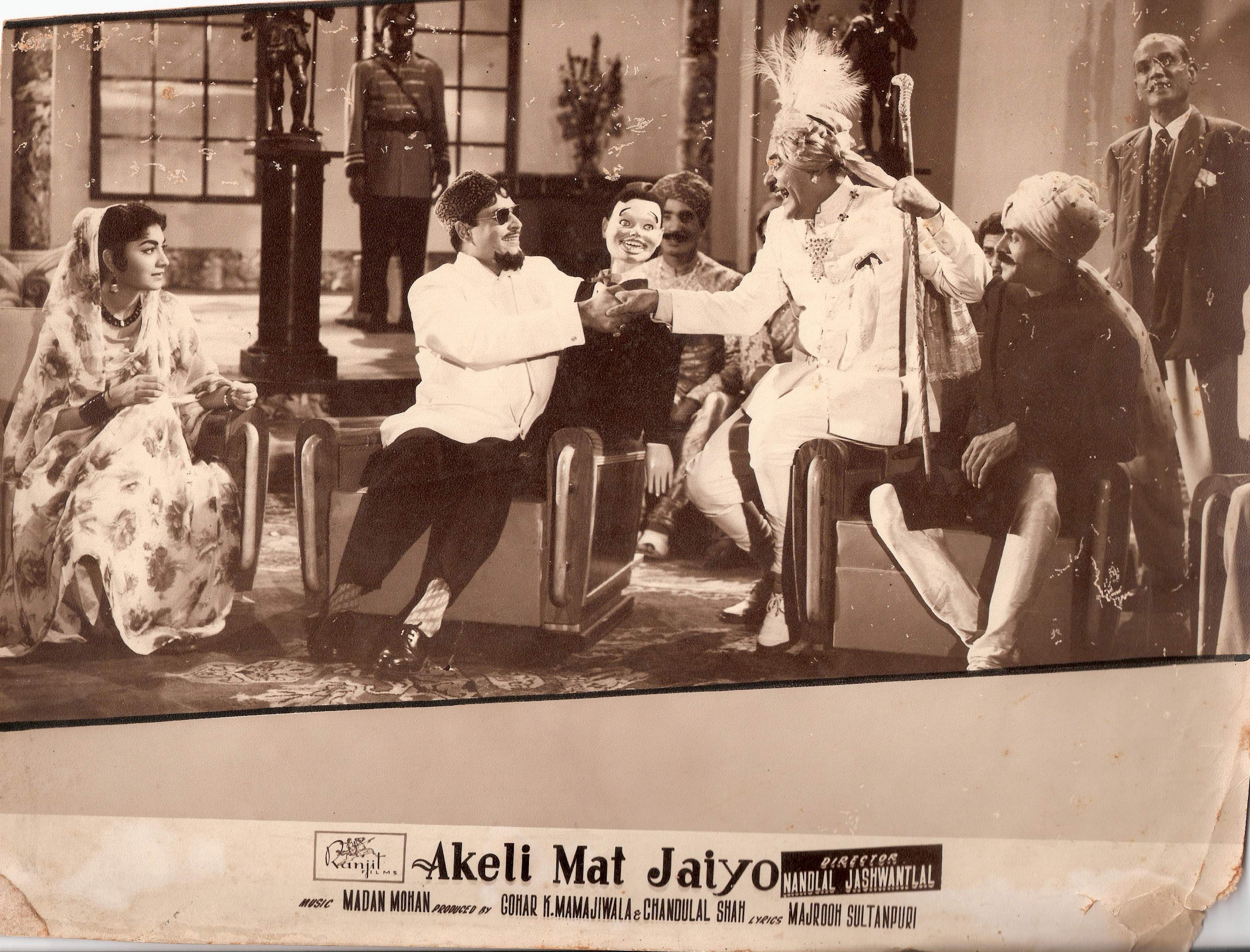
Y.K. Padhye's puppet was used in the film along with Rajendra Kumar

Once the art of ventriloquism gained popularity, he also received offers from film makers. His puppets were featured in one Hindi film called Akeli Mat Jaiyo. His famous puppet "Ardhavatrao" appeared along with actor Rajendra Kumar. The puppet was operated by Padhye himself. The music of the film was composed by Madan Mohan with lyrics by Majrooh Sultanpuri.

== Personal life ==
Y.K. Padhye's son Ramdas Padhye, his daughter-in-law Aparna, and his grandsons Satyajit and Parikshit are also ventriloquists and puppeteers in the entertainment field.
