= Sarah Kagingo =

Ugandan business executive

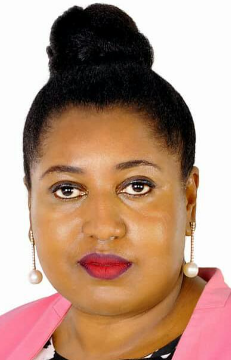
- Education: Makerere University (BLIS; Master of Strategic and Corporate Communication)
- Occupation: Strategic communications executive
- Years active: 2000–present
- Known for: Makerere University Students' Guild President (1997–1998)

Sarah Kagingo (born 1978) is a Ugandan strategic communications executive. She is the founder of SoftPower Communications and serves as vice chairperson of the board of directors of the Private Sector Foundation Uganda (PSFU).

== Early life and education ==
Kagingo was born in 1978 in Kajara, Ntungamo District. She attended Trinity College Nabbingo and Mt St Mary's College Namagunga and later studied library and information science at Makerere University. In January 2025, she graduated Makerere University's Master of Strategic and Corporate Communication programme.

== Career ==
In 1997, Kagingo was elected president of the Makerere University Students' Guild, described as the second woman to hold the post. She later worked in strategic communications, including service at State House as Special Presidential Assistant for Communication, a role associated with managing the President's social media presence. She subsequently founded SoftPower Communications. In August 2021, Kagingo was appointed to manage communications in the office of the Speaker of the Parliament of Uganda. Kagingo has also been an aspirant for the East African Legislative Assembly.
