= African Spelling Bee =

- Venue: Various locations
- Location: Africa
- Organized by: African Spelling Bee Federation
- Participants: National champions from participating countries
- Website: africanspellingbee.com

The African Spelling Bee Championship is an academic spelling competition and consortium held annually across the African continent. Modeled after traditional spelling bees, this event serves as a platform for students to demonstrate their mastery of language and spelling skills. Organized at both national and continental levels, the competition begins with preliminary rounds in participating countries, culminating in a grand finale where finalists from various nations compete for the championship title. The latest edition of the contest was held in Harare, Zimbabwe. The next edition is set to be held in Zambia.

Founded with the aim of promoting literacy, linguistic diversity, and cultural exchange among African youth, the African Spelling Bee has emerged as a significant educational initiative. Through rigorous preparation and competitive spirit, participants engage in oral spelling challenges, tackling words of increasing complexity as they progress through the rounds.

The competition was initiated in 2016 by Roger Dickinson with ten other spelling bee organizations across the continent. The very first edition was held in Johannesburg.

== History ==
The contest was initiated by Roger Dickinson (South Africa) with co-founders Aaron Kirunda (Uganda), Kennedy Odoyo (Kenya), Tshepang Thibedi-Motimola (Botswana), Love Joshua (Nigeria), James Bayanai (Zimbabwe), Ntsako Mkhabela (South Africa), Abiye Tekle (Ethiopia), Lewis Chisale (Malawi) and Tsebo Moketa (Lesotho). The number of organizations has grown to 19 with the addition of The Gambia, Tanzania, Ghana, Rwanda, Benin, Sierra Leone, Ivory Coast, Sudan, South Sudan and the DRC. The African Spelling Bee was founded to create a platform for African children to compete and excel in spelling, thereby encouraging literacy and education throughout the continent. The competition has grown significantly since its inception, with more countries participating each year. The 8th edition of the African Spelling Bee is expected to be the largest in the history of the competition as more than 22 countries will present their best spellers on the stage.

Since its inception, the African Spelling Bee has grown in popularity and scale, with more countries joining and greater participation each year. The event continues to inspire and encourage young learners across the continent. The competition not only hones the spelling skills of participants but also emphasizes the importance of education, literacy, and academic excellence. It provides an opportunity for cultural exchange and the celebration of linguistic diversity within Africa. The organizations of the African Spelling Bee reach out to many various schools in their own respective countries.

== 2023 African Spelling Bee ==
The 6th African Spelling Bee was held in Kampala, Uganda, where Praises Esere Minabowa from Nigeria won the Senior Category, while Ethiopia's David Busha was the first runners–up, in turn placing Ethiopia on the podium for the first time in the competition's history. Tashinga Chereni from Zimbabwe was the second runners–up, which was a major feat for the country. This event also marked the debut of South Sudan, whose participants gained valuable experience and laid the groundwork for future success.

From the junior category, Lesedi Seemane (South Africa) tied with Agaba Austin Jordan (Uganda) to become the first co-champions in the history of the ASB. Claudia Jean Madhombiro from Zimbabwe was the first runners up.

== 2025 African Spelling Bee ==
Due to financial challenges, securing sufficient funding for teams to participate in Abuja was difficult. As a result, several national teams were unable to attend the finals. Despite this setback, the competition went on, with Nigeria’s Joshua Chemeremeze emerging as the champion in the Senior category. He was followed by fellow Nigerian Tijani Rahamat as the first runner-up, and Zimbabwe’s Shamiso Shamiso Mutsahuni as the second runner-up.

The Junior category saw Nigerian speller Atsua Joy become champion, with Uganda’s Nakawooua Abigail and Nigeria’s Wilfred C. Eldad securing the first and second runner-up positions, respectively.

During the 2025 African Spelling Bee, essay writing was introduced as a new branch of the competition, alongside the traditional spelling segment. Like the spelling contest, the essay division featured both Senior and Junior categories. Gideon Benoni from Zambia emerged as the winner in the Senior category, while Anwitha Hareesh from Uganda claimed victory in the Junior category.

== 2026 African Spelling Bee ==
The 8th edition of the African Spelling Bee was hosted in Harare, Zimbabwe. The Senior category had Daniel Adesiyan of Rwanda emerge as the champion, followed by Bree Kambasha of Zimbabwe as first runner-up, and Nicole Manguluti of Malawi as second runner-up.

The Junior category saw Nigerian speller Oluwadamilola Adeolu emerge as champion, with South Africa's Ashton Singh and Nigeria's Abdurraham Yusuf securing the first and second runner-up positions, respectively.

== Structure ==
=== Eligibility and participants ===
Participants in the African Spelling Bee are typically winners or top spellers from national spelling bees held in various African countries. Each participating country organizes its own national spelling bee to select its representatives. The competition generally targets school-aged children, though specific age ranges can vary by country and competition rules.

=== Competition format ===
The competition begins with preliminary rounds where participants are given words to spell. These rounds serve to narrow down the number of contestants. Successful spellers from the preliminary rounds advance to the semi-finals and then to the final round. The format includes oral spelling of increasingly difficult words. Since spelling bees are typically elimination-style competitions, a speller is out of the competition after misspelling a word.

=== Organizations and partners ===
The African Spelling Bee is organized by a coalition of spelling bee organizations from various African countries. Key partners may include educational institutions, government bodies, and corporate sponsors. Notable member organizations include the Nigeria Spelling Bee, South African National Spelling Bee, and Ethiopian Spelling Bee.

== Junior and senior categories ==
The competition is divided into junior and senior categories, with participants competing in various rounds to spell increasingly difficult words. The junior category is typically for younger participants, often ranging from ages 9 to 13. The exact age range can vary depending on the specific rules of the national spelling bees that feed into the African Spelling Bee. The words in the junior category are generally less difficult than those in the senior category, tailored to the age and grade level of the participants. Participants of the junior category are usually in primary or lower secondary school. The senior category is for older participants, typically ranging from ages 14 to 18. As with the junior category, the exact age range can also vary. Words in the senior category are more challenging, reflecting the higher skill level and greater vocabulary expected of older participants. Participants are generally in higher secondary school.
