= Valentine Vox =

British born American ventriloquist

Valentine Vox (born Jack Riley; February 20, 1939) is a British born American ventriloquist and author known for his scholarly book on the history of ventriloquism, I Can See Your Lips Moving: the history and art of ventriloquism, which traces the practice back some three thousand years.

As a ventriloquist Vox's career spanned over 50 years appearing in venues around the world in theatre, cabaret and on television. Besides English, he has performed his act in Japanese and German languages. In 1967 Edgar Bergen described Valentine as: A dishonest ventriloquist — because he doesn’t move his lips.

In 1997 Vox became the director of the International Ventriloquist Association and organized annual conventions in Las Vegas from 1997 to 2003 where he brought together some of the world top ventriloquists which included Jeff Dunham, Nina Conti, Jay Johnson, Ronn Lucas, Mallory Lewis, and Paul Winchell.

Vox took his name from the 1840 Victorian novel by Henry Cockton, The Life and Adventures of Valentine Vox the Ventriloquist.

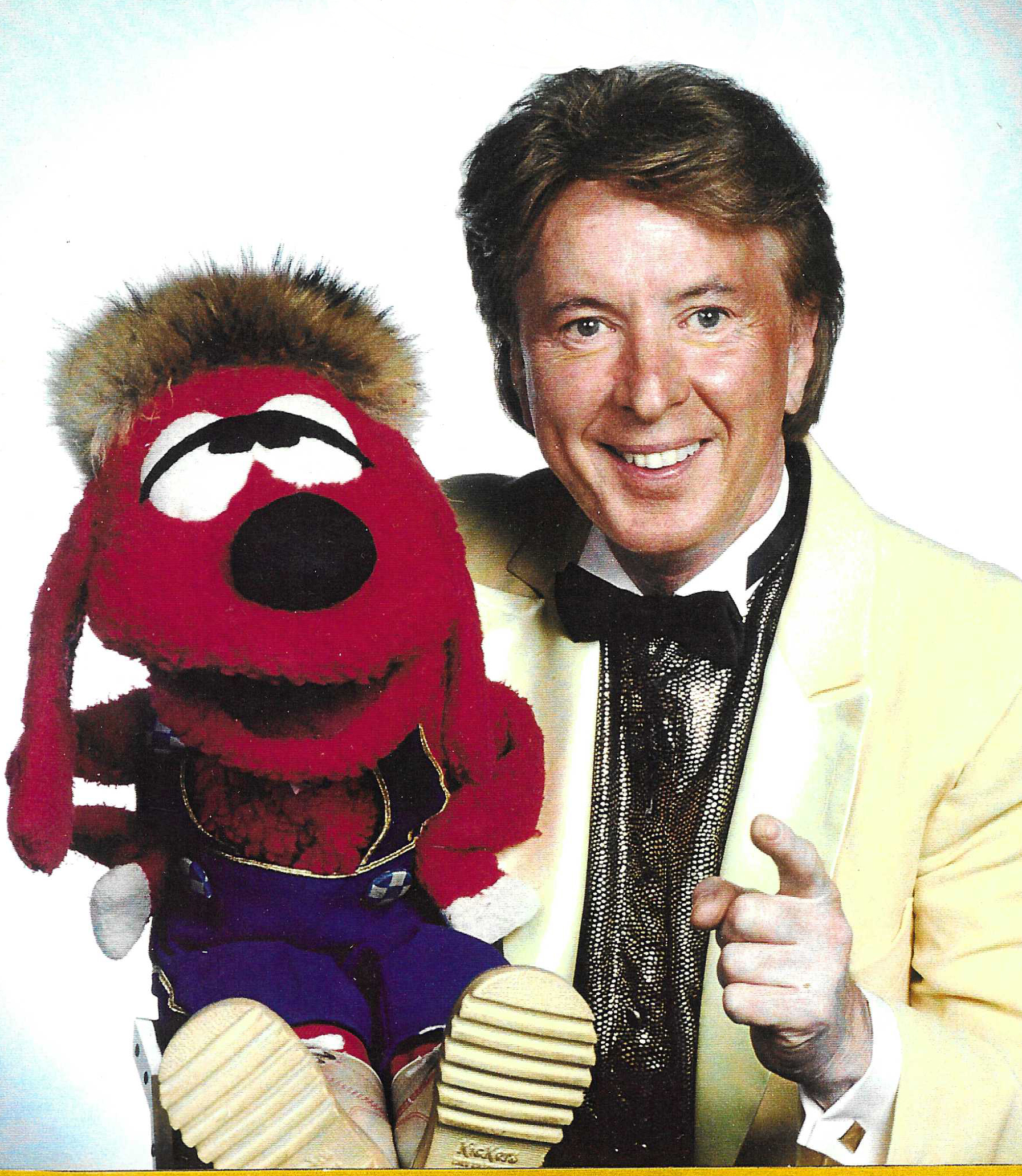

== Early life ==
Vox was born Jack Riley in Highgate, London, the son of May Riley, a cook, and John Riley, who owned a small art studio. He had two sisters, Pat and Sheila.

He became interested in ventriloquism at the age of ten after buying a penny leaflet on “how to do ventriloquism” in a magic shop and was also inspired listening to Educating Archie, a radio show that featured ventriloquist Peter Brough. He persuaded his father and mother to buy him a ventriloquist dummy. He made his debut as a ventriloquist with his new partner at his school before the Christmas break.

Upon leaving school, he became an apprentice photographer at the Stephen Shaw Studio in Crouch End. He learned the craft quickly, and one of his pictures was published on the front cover of Crusade, a national magazine, in 1955. In 1958 he immigrated to Canada with his wife Sylvia and their daughter Jacqueline.

== Early career ==
Shortly after settling in Toronto, Vox's interest in ventriloquism was revived, influenced through watching the many ventriloquists who appeared on the Ed Sullivan Show. In 1960 he created a team of Canadian characters: a beaver named Basil, an Eskimo Ootuk and Daniel O’Rourke, a Royal Canadian Mountie figure and began performing as a children's entertainer going under his ancestral family name of O’Reilly.

In 1963 he landed a job as a warm-up man on a national television show Razzle Dazzle broadcast by CBC and made his television debut on the show January 14, 1965.

Between 1965 and 1968, he appeared on a biweekly guest spot on the Uncle Bobby show, a morning kids’ program broadcast on CFTO channel nine in Toronto.

In 1966, he turned his hand to acting and became part of the Questors, a theater company in Toronto, and was cast in the lead role in A Stranger unto My Brethren, a controversial play dealing with the subject of homosexuality. For his leading role as Michael Hamilton he won “best actor” award at the Ontario Drama Festival in Toronto. Later he became a resident actor in the newly formed theater company Theatre Toronto (1968) under the direction of Clifford Williams.

In 1967, he appeared on the prime time national TV show To Tell The Truth and defeated the panel by convincing them that the three ventriloquial voices he produced were coming from the two impostors.

In the same year, Edgar Bergen, who was doing a nostalgic tour playing venues across North America, was appearing at the Royal York Hotel in Toronto. The producers of the Uncle Bobby Show approached Bergen with the idea of performing on the show with Vox. Bergen agreed and the segment featuring the two ventriloquists performing together was aired nationally on the weekly show on CTV.

In 1968, Vox was asked by Arc Records to make an L.P. teaching ventriloquism. The record producer, Ken Warriner, suggested that the recording begin with a lesson about the history of the art. It was this suggestion that inspired Vox to venture on a quest to write the first book on the history of the art. The L.P. You Can Be A Ventriloquist was released in 1968 on the Saga Label.

== Author ==
In 1970, Vox returned to the UK to pursue this goal to write a book on the history of ventriloquism. He began researching at the British Museum library and University of London library where he met the librarian of the Harry Price Library, Alan Wesencraft, who became his mentor and taught him the science of research.

Unable to find a publisher to take on an unknown subject and produce the high-quality illustrated tome that he had envisaged, he decided to design the work himself. Vox befriended Peter Stockham, who owned a children's bookshop Peter Stockham at Images, on the Charing Cross road and who became Vox's book consultant. Peter Stockham encouraged Vox to produce 12 copies of the prototype and present it at the 1980 Frankfurt Book Fair. It was at the fair that publisher Kaye and Ward bought the world publication rights. Shortly after this, the publishing house Heinemann acquired Kaye & Ward and published Vox's work under the Kaye and Ward imprint.

I Can See your Lips Moving, the history and art of ventriloquism, was published in October 1981 and received favorable reviews from the press and media. A subsequent condensed German edition was published in 1984, an American edition in 1993 and a Japanese edition in 2003. To coincide with the publication of the book, Vox presented an Exhibition on Ventriloquism at the V&A Museum of Childhood in London. The exhibition was opened on October 20, 1981, and while it was set to end on February 2, it broke attendance records and was extended for a further month. Both the exhibition and the book were featured on the BBC evening news and the iconic children's show Blue Peter. Heinemann encouraged Vox to design several more books under their imprint. One of these was Aerobics Stretch and Shape Workout.

== Theater and Television ==
When he returned to the UK in 1970, Vox dropped his Canadian characters in favor of his soft puppet Jeorge, a dog, which became his main character. He also used another soft puppet character, Orlando. He made his British television debut with Jeorge on the Basil Brush Show on BBC in 1970. Shortly after this, he did a warm up spot for the David Nixon show at Thames Television that was seen by the head of Children's programming, Lewis Rudd, who approached him with the idea of building a show around his character Jeorge.

Larry Parker was hired to develop the story line for the show, which became the By Jeorge show and was centered on the premise that the ventriloquial duo worked in a television properties department where Jeorge mischievously puts on his own show in front of a live audience.

Frank Thornton played the irate manager of the fictitious TV station and Harold Goodwin was the friend of Jeorge. Ali Bongo provided the magic section. The title track By Jeorge was written by Graham Gouldman of 10cc. The pilot was aired in December 1972 but failed to garner any enthusiasm from the executives at Thames.

Sue Turner became the new head of Children's programming and offered Vox instead a 15-minute lunchtime slot, Happy House, a national program aimed at preschoolers featuring ventriloquists and puppeteers. After several shows, Turner gave the whole series to Vox. The shows, a total of 18, were taped at the Thames Television studios in Teddington and Euston and aired in 1973/74. Prior to Happy House, the duo also appeared on another Thames daytime show, Zingalong.

In 1978, Valentine Vox was invited to the US to appear on the third Adult Ventriloquist Comedy show, Dummies, a HBO mini series featuring top ventriloquists from around the world and hosted by Steve Allen. Vox was also seen on the small screen in the UK at this time in a beer commercial for a bitter from the Worthington Brewery.

In 1982, at a film/video convention in London, Vox met producer Peter Hill of Channel Video, who pitched the idea of making a children's show especially for the fledgling home video market. My Video Party was videotaped by Lacewing Productions for Channel Video in Winchester, England and hosted by Valentine Vox with Jeorge to become the first ever Children's show made for the video market, which was released in July 1983.

In 1985 Vox became a resident performer in a revue at the Magic Casino in Switzerland where he did his act in German. He also designed the Museum der Bauchrednerkunst (Museum of Ventriloquism), which was part of the attraction.

He presented his German act for a season at the Varieté-Theater (Variety Theater) in Stuttgart in 1987. He also appeared on numerous television shows in Switzerland, Austria and Germany, including the popular variety show from East Germany, Ein Kessel Buntes.

He eventually left Switzerland, which had been his base for five years, and came to the US in 1989 where he took up residency and in 1993 he became part of a variety show at the Magic & Movie Hall of Fame theater on the Las Vegas Strip, a 20,000 foot attraction of Movie, Magic and ventriloquist memorabilia. Vox designed the ventriloquist section, which was brought over from Switzerland. From 1995 to 2000 he performed at this venue in his own show, More Magic, doing both ventriloquism and magic. In 1997, Vox formed the International Ventriloquist Association, of which he became the director and began to organize an annual ventriloquist convention in Las Vegas. The first of these brought together some big names, including Jay Johnson, Jimmy Nelson, Ronn Lucas, Jeff Dunham and the legendary Paul Winchell. The highlight of these conventions which were named The Vegas Ventriloquist Festival was the gala show Ventastic, which was devised and produced by Vox. The convention ran for nine years and was widely covered by the media, including Good Morning America and the Today Show with guest correspondent, Candice Bergen.

At the 2003 Vegas Ventriloquist Festival, Vox married Eyvonne Carter and over 200 ventriloquists attended The Ventriloquist's Wedding. This highly publicized event was aired on 60 television news outlets around the world and featured on Jimmy Kimmel Live, the Rita Rudner Show, Live! with Regis and Kelly and the Tonight Show with Jay Leno.

Valentine Vox became an American citizen in 2009.

== Works ==
- Vox, Valentine (1993). I Can See Your Lips Moving, the history and art of ventriloquism (US ed.). U.S.A.: Plato/Players Press. p. 223. ISBN 0-88734-622-7.
