= Private Sector Foundation Uganda =

- Abbreviation: PSFU
- Formation: 1995
- Type: Non-profit organization
- Headquarters: Kampala, Uganda
- Region served: Uganda
- Executive Director: Stephen Asiimwe
- Website: psfuganda.org

Private Sector Foundation Uganda (PSFU) is Uganda’s apex body for the private sector, formed in 1995 to coordinate business interests and foster private sector growth. PSFU engages government and stakeholders to shape policies that support business growth. It offers training, mentorship and advisory services to entrepreneurs and businesses.

PSFU manages donor-funded programs, including initiatives that support women, youth and exporters.

It supports businesses to access regional and international markets, including through AfCFTA awareness campaigns.

Stephen Asiimwe is the current Executive Director of PSFU.
