= Young Achievers Award =

National competition held annually in Uganda

- Country: Uganda
- Presented by: YAA
- First award: September 14, 2009
- Website: youngachieversawards.ug

The Young Achievers Awards (YAA) is a national competition held annually in Uganda which selects and promotes the best practice and excellence in youth creativity.

YAA focuses on entrepreneurship and leadership development among youth in Uganda. The organization facilitates collaborative projects intended to address developmental challenges in sectors such as ICT, health, education, gender equality, and the arts.

== History ==
Founded in 2009 by Awel Uwihanganye and Ivan Serwano Kyambadde, the Award was created as a platform to showcase young people creating economic opportunity, attaining financial independence and improve their leadership abilities .

=== Award categories ===
- Young Achiever - Business and Trade
- Young Achiever - Media and Society
- Young Achiever - Leadership and Governance
- Young Achiever - Art, Fashion and Culture
- Young Achiever - Music and Entertainment
- Young Achiever - Sports
- Young Achiever - I.C.T Solutions
- Overall Young Achievers of the Year
- Young Achiever's Heroes/Heroine Award
- Lifetime Achievement Award
- Young Achievers Star Hall Of Fame
- Overall Young Achiever

== See also ==
- List of Young Achievers Award winners
