= Ventriloquism =

Performing voices through a puppet to seem independent of the speaker

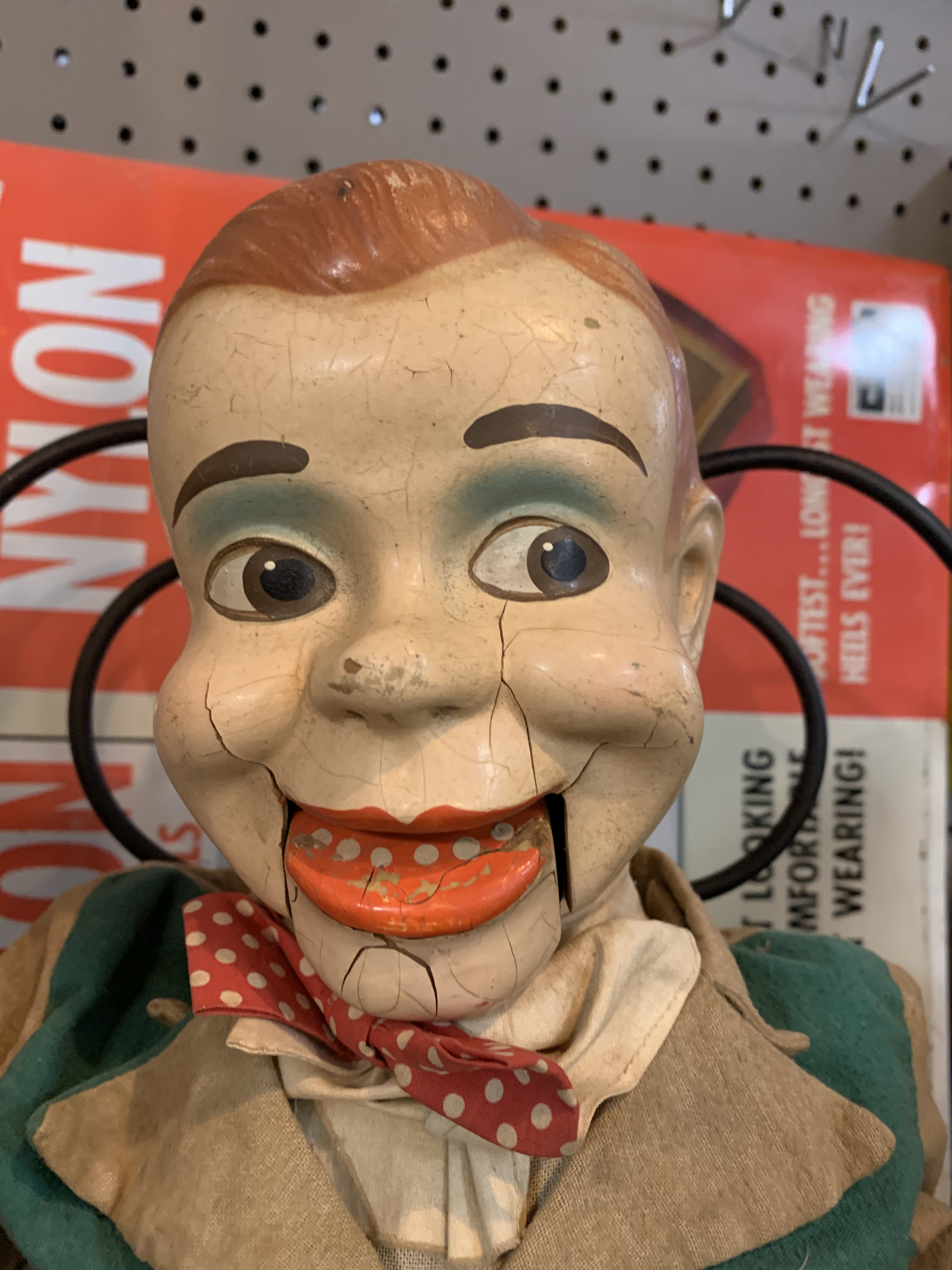
Ventriloquist dummy in the shape of a young boy

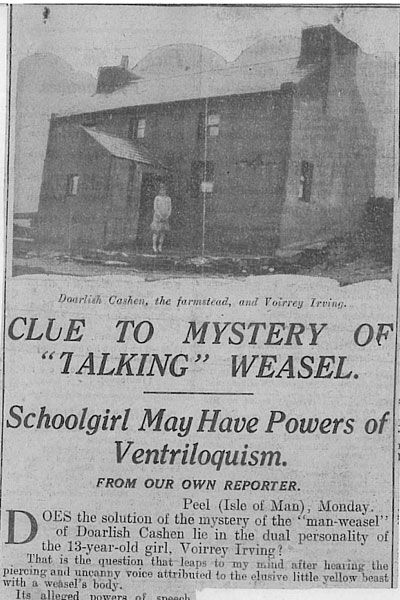
Newspaper article on Gef, the talking mongoose, claiming it involved ventriloquism by Voirrey Irving

Ventriloquism is the performance art of speaking or producing sounds so that the voice appears to come from a source other than the performer, most often a puppet or "dummy." Ventriloquists create the illusion of a separate character by manipulating the puppet and producing distinct voices, often for comedy, storytelling, or theatrical entertainment. The technique requires precise vocal control and minimal lip movement. Ventriloquism has historical roots in ancient cultures and theater, and it continues to be practiced in live performances, television, and media worldwide.

== History ==
=== Origins ===
Originally, ventriloquism was a religious practice. The name comes from the Latin for 'to speak from the belly': Venter (belly) and loqui (speak). The ancient Greeks used the term engastrimythos (Ancient Greek: ἐγγαστρίμυθος) or engastrimantis (Ancient Greek: ἐγγαστρίμαντις) to refer to a person (mostly women) who delivered oracles by these means. The noises produced by the stomach were thought to be the voices of the unliving, who took up residence in the stomach of the ventriloquist. The ventriloquist would then interpret the sounds, as they were thought to be able to speak to the dead, as well as foretell the future. One of the earliest recorded group of prophets to use this technique was the Pythia, the priestess at the temple of Apollo in Delphi, who acted as the conduit for the Delphic Oracle.

One of the most successful early gastromancers was Eurykles, a prophet at Athens; gastromancers came to be referred to as Euryklides in his honour. Other parts of the world also have a tradition of ventriloquism for ritual or religious purposes; historically there have been adepts of this practice among the Zulu, Inuit, and Māori peoples.

=== Emergence as entertainment ===
The shift from ventriloquism as manifestation of spiritual forces toward ventriloquism as entertainment happened in the eighteenth century at travelling funfairs and market towns. An early depiction of a ventriloquist dates to 1754 in England, where Sir John Parnell is depicted in the painting An Election Entertainment by William Hogarth as speaking via his hand. In 1757, the Austrian Baron de Mengen performed with a small doll.

By the late 18th century, ventriloquist performances were an established form of entertainment in England, although most performers "threw their voice" to make it appear that it emanated from far away (known as distant ventriloquism), rather than the modern method of using a puppet (near ventriloquism). (Note: Edgar Bergen explains in his book on ventriloquism that the voice is not actually "thrown"; rather, the illusion of distance is created by exerting pressure on the vocal chords.) A well-known ventriloquist of the period, Joseph Askins, who performed at the Sadler's Wells Theatre in London in the 1790s advertised his act as "curious ad libitum Dialogues between himself and his invisible familiar, Little Tommy". However, other performers were beginning to incorporate dolls or puppets into their performance, notably the Irishman James Burne who "carries in his pocket, an ill-shaped doll, with a broad face, which he exhibits ... as giving utterance to his own childish jargon," and Thomas Garbutt.

The entertainment came of age during the era of the music hall in the United Kingdom and vaudeville in the United States. George Sutton began to incorporate a puppet act into his routine at Nottingham in the 1830s, followed by Fred Neiman later in the century, but it is Fred Russell who is regarded as the father of modern ventriloquism. In 1886, he was offered a professional engagement at the Palace Theatre in London and took up his stage career permanently. His act, based on the cheeky-boy dummy "Coster Joe" that would sit in his lap and 'engage in a dialogue' with him was highly influential for the entertainment format and was adopted by the next generation of performers. A blue plaque has been embedded in a former residence of Russell by the British Heritage Society which reads 'Fred Russell the father of ventriloquism lived here'. Fred Russell's successful comedy team format was applied by the next generation of ventriloquists. It was taken forward by the British Arthur Prince with his dummy Sailor Jim, who became one of the highest paid entertainers on the music hall circuit, and by the Americans The Great Lester and Edgar Bergen. Bergen, together with his favorite figure Charlie McCarthy, hosted a radio program that was broadcast from 1937 to 1956 and which was No. 1 on the nights it aired, popularizing the idea of the comedic ventriloquist. Bergen continued performing until his death in 1978, and his popularity inspired many other famous ventriloquists who followed him, including Ray Alan, Arthur Worsley, Paul Winchell, Jimmy Nelson, David Strassman, Jeff Dunham, Terry Fator, Ronn Lucas, Wayland Flowers, Shari Lewis, Willie Tyler, Jay Johnson, Nina Conti, Paul Zerdin, and Darci Lynne. Another ventriloquist act popular in the United States in the 1950s and 1960s was Señor Wences.

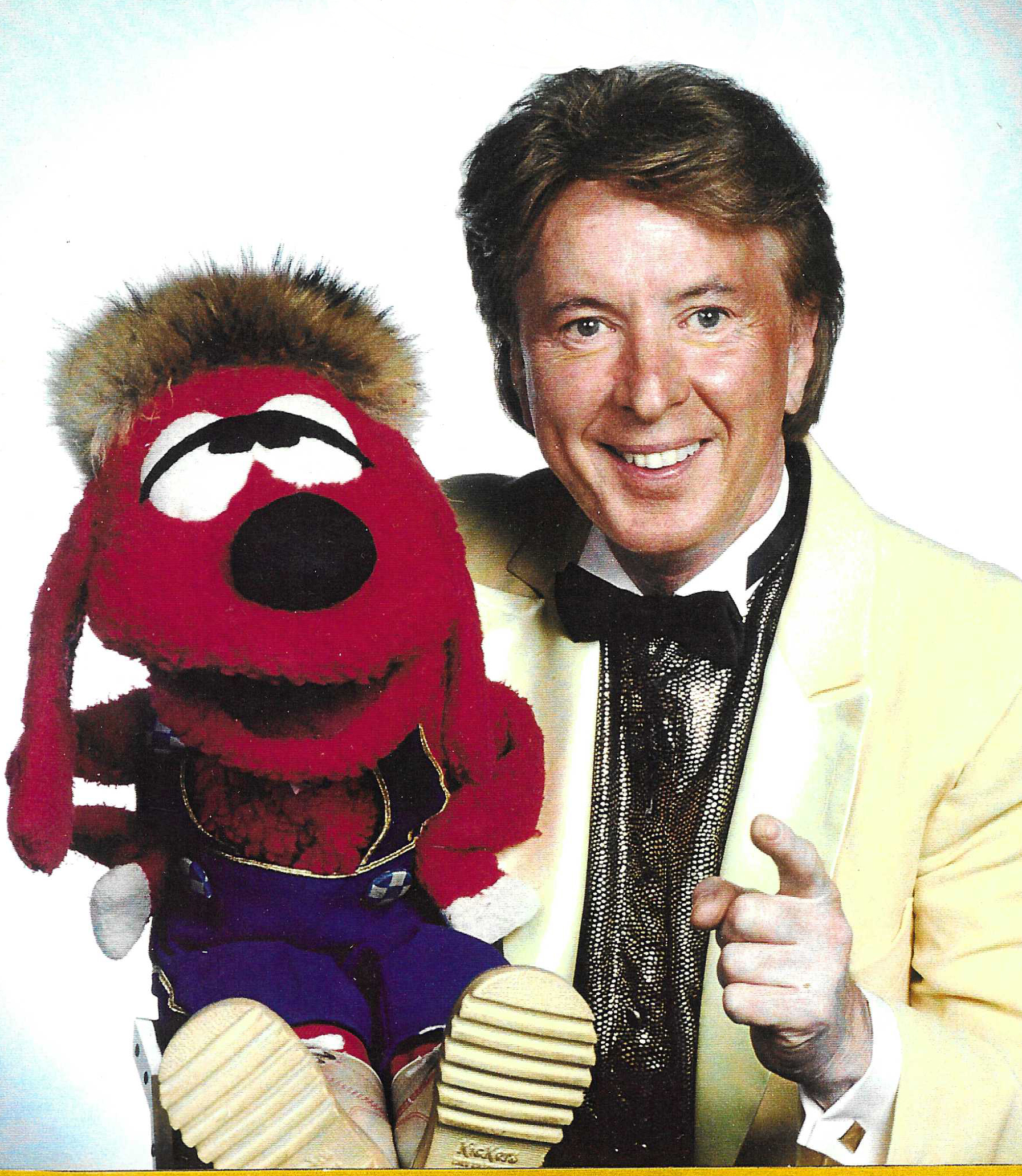
Ventriloquist/author Valentine Vox with his puppet Jeorge

In 1981 the first book on the history of ventriloquism was published; I Can See Your Lips Moving: the history and art of ventriloquism (Kaye & Ward). Its author, ventriloquist Valentine Vox, staged the first exhibition on ventriloquism at the Victoria & Albert's, Museum of Childhood, in London to coincide with the publication of the book.

In India, the art of ventriloquism was popularized by Y. K. Padhye and M. M. Roy, who are believed to be the pioneers of this field in India, beginning in the 1920s. Y. K. Padhye's son Ramdas Padhye borrowed from him and made the art popular amongst the masses through his performance on television. Ramdas Padhye's name is synonymous with puppet characters like Ardhavatrao (also known as Mr. Crazy), Tatya Vinchu and Bunny the Funny which features in a television advertisement for Lijjat Papad, an Indian snack. Ramdas Padhye's son Satyajit Padhye is also a ventriloquist.

The popularity of ventriloquism fluctuates. American comedian Jeff Dunham has been credited with reviving the artform and is said to have done more promoting it than anyone since Edgar Bergen. Professional ventriloquists have never been ubiquitous; always in the handfuls, never in the hundreds. A number of modern ventriloquists have developed a following as the public taste for live comedy grows. In 2007, Zillah & Totte won the first season of Sweden's Got Talent and became one of Sweden's most popular family/children entertainers. A feature-length documentary about ventriloquism, I'm No Dummy, was released in 2010. Three ventriloquists have won America's Got Talent: Terry Fator in 2007, Paul Zerdin in 2015 and Darci Lynne in 2017. Two ventriloquists, Damien James and Christine Barger, have appeared on Penn & Teller: Fool Us. Several ventriloquists have grown large followings on popular social media apps, as well. In 2025, Alex Vadukul and Dina Litovsky of the New York Times described Sophie Becker as "reviving a vaudevillian art form".

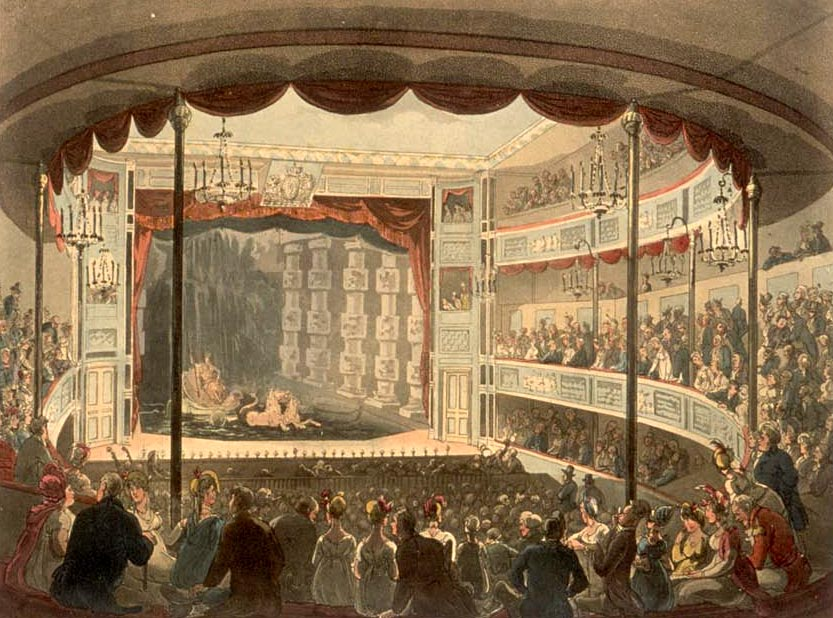
Sadler's Wells Theatre in the early 19th century, at a time when ventriloquist acts were becoming increasingly popular

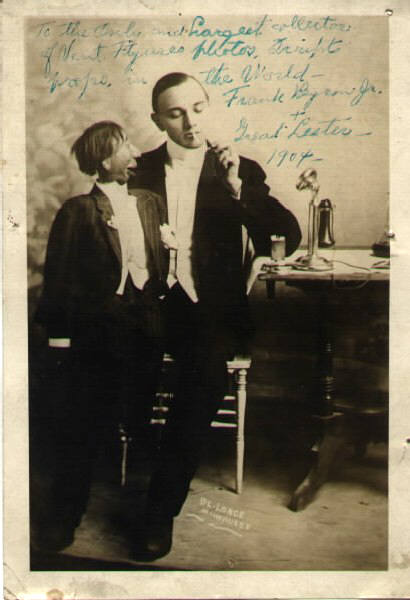
Ventriloquist The Great Lester with Frank Byron, Jr. on his knee, c. 1904

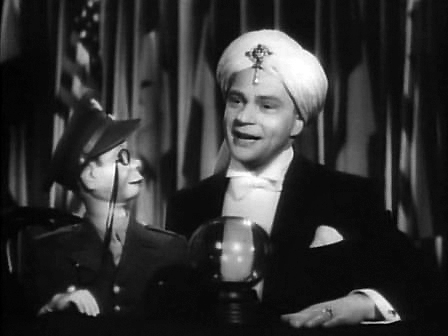
Ventriloquist Edgar Bergen and his best-known sidekick, Charlie McCarthy, in the film Stage Door Canteen (1943)

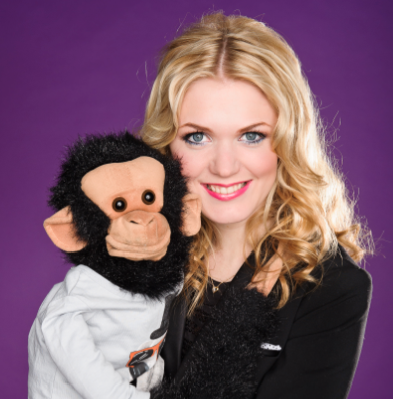
Swedish ventriloquist act Zillah & Totte

== Vocal technique ==
One difficulty ventriloquists face is that all the sounds that they make must be made with lips slightly separated. For the labial sounds f, v, b, p, and m, the only choice is to replace them with others. A widely parodied example of this difficulty is the "gottle o' gear", from the reputed inability of less-skilled practitioners to pronounce "bottle of beer". If variations of the sounds th, d, t, and n are spoken quickly, it can be difficult for listeners to notice a difference.

== Ventriloquist's dummy ==
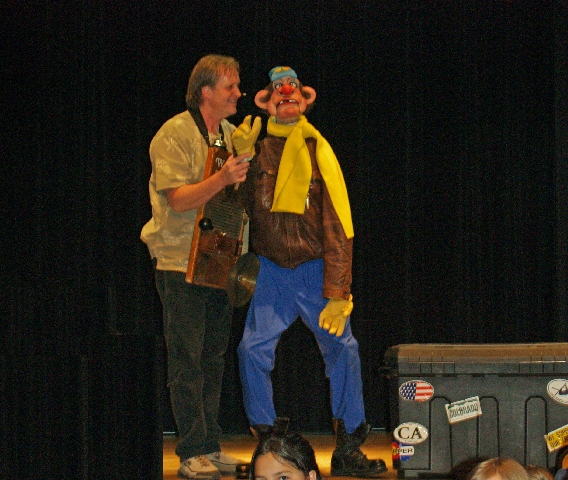
A ventriloquist entertaining children at the Pueblo, Colorado, Buell Children's Museum

Modern ventriloquists use multiple types of puppets in their presentations, ranging from soft cloth or foam puppets (Verna Finly's work is a pioneering example), flexible latex puppets (such as Steve Axtell's creations) and the traditional and familiar hard-headed knee figure (Tim Selberg's mechanized carvings).

The classic dummies used by ventriloquists (the technical name for which is ventriloquial figure) vary in size anywhere from twelve inches tall to human-size and larger, with the height usually 34–42 in (86–107 cm). Traditionally, this type of puppet has been made from papier-mâché or wood. In modern times, other materials are often employed, including fiberglass-reinforced resins, urethanes, filled (rigid) latex, and neoprene. Traditionally, the ventriloquist's dummy is given a flippant personality who unapologetically insults their ventriloquist and often members of the audience as well.

Notable names in the history of dummy making include Jeff Dunham, Frank Marshall (the Chicago creator of Bergen's Charlie McCarthy, Nelson's Danny O'Day, and Winchell's Jerry Mahoney), Theo Mack and Son (Mack carved Charlie McCarthy's head), Revello Petee, Kenneth Spencer, Cecil Gough, and Glen & George McElroy. The McElroy brothers' figures are still considered by many ventriloquists as the apex of complex movement mechanics, with as many as fifteen facial and head movements controlled by interior finger keys and switches.

Jeff Dunham referred to his McElroy figure Skinny Dugan as "the Stradivarius of dummies." The Juro Novelty Company also manufactured dummies. Geoffrey Moran of Australia has built foam puppets Koala (Kevin) and Billy Baby.

=== In popular culture ===
The plots of some films and television programs are based on "killer toy" dummies that are alive and horrific. These include "The Dummy", a May 4, 1962 episode of The Twilight Zone; Devil Doll; Dead Silence; Zapatlela; Buffy the Vampire Slayer; Goosebumps; Tales from the Crypt; Gotham (the episode "Nothing's Shocking"); Friday the 13th: The Series; Toy Story 4; and Doctor Who in different episodes. This genre has also been satirized on television in ALF (the episode "I'm Your Puppet"); Seinfeld (the episode "The Chicken Roaster"); and the comic strip Monty.

Some psychological horror films and other works feature psychotic ventriloquists who believe their dummies are alive and use them as surrogates to commit frightening acts including murder. Examples of this include the 1978 film Magic, the 1945 anthology film Dead of Night, and the Ventriloquist from Batman comics and other Batman media.

Literary examples of frightening ventriloquist dummies include Gerald Kersh's The Horrible Dummy and the story "The Glass Eye" by John Keir Cross. In music, NRBQ's video for their song "Dummy" (2004) features four ventriloquist dummies modelled after the band members who 'lip-sync' the song while wandering around a dark, abandoned house.

== See also ==
- Lip reading
- List of ventriloquists
- Multisensory integration
- The Shari Lewis Show
- Visual capture
