= Adinath Kothare =

Indian actor, director and producer (born 1984)

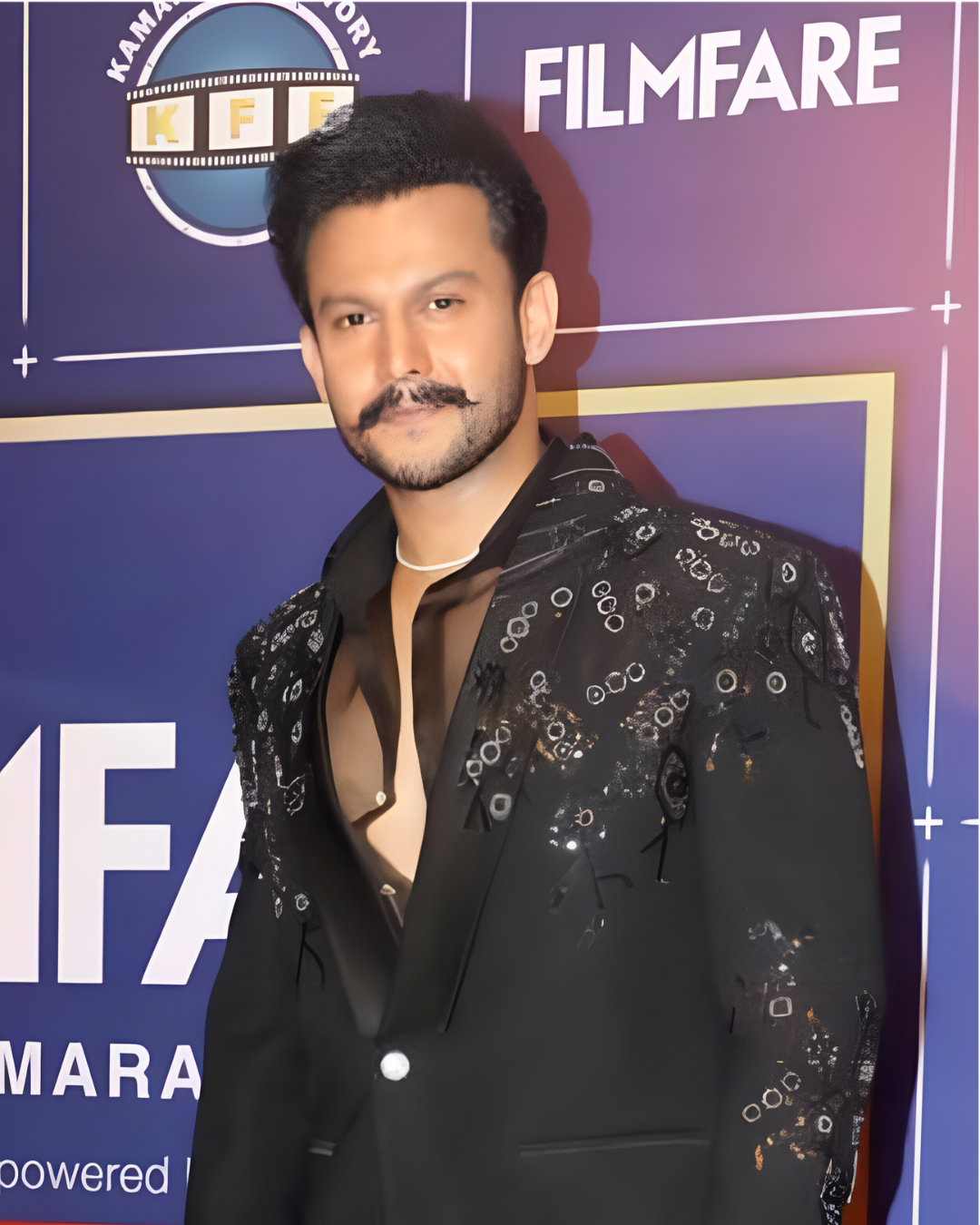
- Kothare in 2025
- Born: Adinath Mahesh Kothare; 13 May 1984 (age 42); Mumbai, Maharashtra, India
- Occupations: Actor; filmmaker
- Years active: 1994–present
- Organisations: Kothare Vision Pvt. Ltd.; Storyteller’s Nook Pvt. Ltd.
- Spouse: Urmilla Kanetkar (m. 2011; div. 2026)
- Children: 1
- Family: Kothare family

Adinath Kothare (pronounced [ˈaːd̪iːnaːt̪ʰ koʈʰaːɾe]; born 13 May 1984) is an Indian actor and filmmaker who predominantly works in Marathi and Hindi cinema. He has received numerous accolades, including a National Film Award, a Maharashtra State Film Award, three Filmfare Marathi Awards and four Zee Chitra Gaurav Puraskar.

Born into the Kothare family, he first appeared on screen as a child actor in his father's film Majha Chakula (1994). As an adult, he made his acting debut with Ved Lavi Jeeva, earning a nomination at the Zee Chitra Gaurav Puraskar, and went on to appear in the sports drama Standby (2011) and Aditya Sarpotdar's college drama Satrangi Re (2012). He gained recognition for playing a ventriloquist in Zapatlela 2 (2013), an adventurous young man in Hello Nandan (2014), an atheist student in Avatarachi Goshta (2014) and cricketer Dilip Vengsarkar in the Hindi film 83 (2021).

He rose to prominence in the 2020s with the musical romantic drama Chandramukhi (2022), followed by the family drama Shaktimaan and the comedy Panchak (both 2024). The former earned him his first Filmfare Marathi Award nomination. Kothare made his directorial debut with Paani, which won the National Film Award for Best Film on Environment Conservation/Preservation along with several other awards and nominations. He was also a part of series such as City of Dreams - Season 2 and Crime Beat (2025).

Kothare and his father jointly own Kothare Vision, a production company established in 2008 that produces films, television serials, and web series. He was married to actress Urmila Kothare, with whom he has a daughter.

== Early life ==
Kothare was born on 13 May 1984 in Mumbai, Maharashtra, to Mahesh Kothare and Nilima Kothare. His father, Mahesh Kothare, is a renowned Indian filmmaker, actor, and producer known for his contributions to Marathi cinema. He pioneered innovative techniques, including special effects and fantasy elements. His mother, Nilima, is a homemaker. Coming from a family deeply rooted in the film industry, Kothare is the grandson of Amber Kothare and Saroj Kothare. Amber Kothare was a veteran Marathi theater artist, actor, and film producer, widely recognized for his contributions to experimental theater. Later, he also played negative and character roles in his son's films. Saroj Kothare, popularly known in the industry as Jenma, was a respected colorist and producer.

== Career ==
=== Child actor and initial work (1994–2009) ===
Kothare began his career as a child actor in 1994 at the age of ten starring in his father's Marathi directorial drama Majha Chakula. He played a pivotal role as a mischievous boy who gets kidnapped from a bank but cleverly escapes from his captors, with actress Nivedita Saraf portraying his mother in the film. The movie was both a critical and commercial success, earning Kothare the Maharashtra State Film Award for Best Child Actor.

Subsequently, he was an assistant director to his father on Chimani Pakhar, Pachadlela and Khabardar.

=== Lead Acting Debut and Recognition (2010–2015) ===
Kothare made his leading debut in 2010 with Ved Lavi Jeeva, opposite debutant Vaidehi Parshurami. Directed by his father, the love drama featured him as a car mechanic who falls in love with a wealthy girl. The film and the lead pair's chemistry were well received, earning Kothare nominations for Best Debut and Best Actor at the Zee Chitra Gaurav Puraskar. The following year, he starred as a footballer in Sanjay Surkar's sports drama Stand By, which explored corruption, favoritism, and nepotism in Indian football. While the film received mixed reviews, Taran Adarsh of Bollywood Hungama praised Kothare's performance, stating, "It is Adinath Kothare who catches you with complete surprise in a challenging role that offers him ample scope to exhibit his range as an actor." Kothare then starred alongside Urmila Kanetkar in Dubhang, playing a financially struggling boxer dealing with unexpected challenges after having twins. It was the first Marathi film to use Dolby Digital 7.1 sound technology. Namita Nivas of The Indian Express appreciated his performance, remarking, "Kothare as Rohan is very impressive in his performance but he looks to young to play father." In 2012, his only release was the musical romance Satrangi Re, directed by Aditya Sarpotdar.

He gained further attention in 2013 as Aditya Bolke in Zapatlela 2, the sequel to the 1993 cult classic horror-comedy Zapatlela, making it the first Marathi film to be released in 3D. His performance received widespread acclaim from both critics and audiences. A critic from The Times of India praised him, stating, "The young Kothare carries the film on his shoulders with his zany charm, nervous energy and excellent comic timing." The film grossed ₹12 crore (US$1.3 million), making it the third highest-grossing marathi film of 2013. In the same year, he reunited with Sonalee Kulkarni in Neeraj Udhwani's Hindi short film Rewind, where he played a man who discovers his arranged bride was once a call girl he had paid, struggles to accept her past, but eventually realizes his mistake. India Forums and India.com listed the short film among the Top 20 and Top 10 best short films, respectively.

2014 was a busy year for Kothare, with five releases. He starred in Hello Nandan, a thriller about a man searching for a lost mobile number, which leads to life-altering discoveries. The Times of India praised his performance, stating, "He is at ease in front of the camera and expresses the frustration, confusion and helplessness of Nandan with effortless ease." He then starred in Gajendra Ahire's Anvatt, playing a doctor alongside his wife, Urmila Kanetkar, in what marked their second and final collaboration. They portrayed a couple who decide to spend a year in a remote village to fulfill Vinay's late grandfather's wish. The film received critical acclaim, with their performances being particularly appreciated. Additionally, their on-screen kissing scene became a widely discussed topic, adding to the film's buzz. He also played romantic leads in Ishq Wala Love and Premasathi Coming Suun, both of which received mixed receptions. His final release of the year was the critically and commercially acclaimed Marathi drama Avatarachi Goshta, where he portrayed an atheist engineering student who helps a young boy break free from his fantasy of avatars. Keertikumar Kadam remarked, "Adinath looks cute and boyish and has delivered ably, what was expected from him, but he has been wasted in the first half. However, in the second half, director has given his character maximum scope."

In 2015, he had a brief role in Ahire's period drama Nilkanth Master, set during India's independence movement, where he played a revolutionary leader. The film premiered as the closing film at the International Film Festival of India but received mixed reviews upon release. He also appeared in Shrabani Deodhar's Sata Lota Pan Sagla Khota. He made his television debut in the thrilling crime drama 100 Days on Zee Marathi, starring alongside Tejaswini Pandit as a PSI officer investigating a woman's husband's murder.

=== Directorial Debut and commercial success (2018–present) ===
After a three-year gap, Kothare returned in 2018 with a supporting role in Take Care Good Night, a cybercrime thriller. Mihir Bhanage of The Times of India noted, "Kothare makes the most of his role but should’ve had more screen time."

The year 2019 proved pivotal, he starred opposite Mrunmayee Deshpande in Madhuri Dixit's maiden production 15 August. The same year, he made his directorial debut with Paani, a survival drama co-produced by Priyanka Chopra’s Purple Pebble Pictures. The film, based on the true story of Hanumant Kendre, a man from drought-hit Nanded (played by Kothare himself), had been in development since 2014 and was filmed in 2016. Premiered at the New York Film Festival and screened at the National Film Archive of India, Paani was highly acclaimed but underperformed theatrically. Siddhant Adlakha of Firstpost called it, "a nuanced character piece" and wrote, "Kothare commands both sides of the camera. Behind it, he crafts a masterful portrait of rural Nagdarwadi and its villagers, ...in front of it, Kothare plays a paragon of decency around whom his story pivots." Nandini Ramnath for Scroll.in wrote, "Kothare is competent too as the home-grown hero who rouses the masses into performing a rare Marathwada miracle." while Kalpeshraj Kubal of The Times of India stated, "He is at his natural best here, portraying the struggle, determination and optimism through Hanumant's portrayal." The film and Kothare's work were honored with multiple awards, including the MaTa Sanman, Zee Chitra Gaurav Puraskar, and Filmfare Awards Marathi for Best Director. Paani also won the Best Film on Environment Conservation/Preservation at the 66th National Film Awards.

In 2020, Kothare appeared in the romantic short film Shevanti, which explored the journey of a couple through the phases of love—before and after marriage, and how their relationship evolves over time. The film garnered critical appreciation and was officially selected for the Asian Film Festival, Mumbai International Film Festival, and Siliguri Short Film Festival. It also won the Best Short Film award at the Maac 24FPS International Animation Awards. Kothare joined the ensemble cast of 83 (2021), Kabir Khan’s biographical sports drama about India's historic cricket World Cup victory. He portrayed a stylish right-handed batsman and one of India's most successful players of the 1980s, Dilip Vengsarkar, who missed the latter half of the tournament due to an injury sustained during the 1983 Cricket World Cup. Despite critical acclaim, the film underperformed at the Indian box office.

In 2022, Kothare portrayed a charismatic politician in Prasad Oak's musical romantic drama Chandramukhi opposite Amruta Khanvilkar. The film was based on Vishwas Patil's novel of the same name. To prepare for the role, he underwent rigorous training to perfect his body language and mannerisms, even turning down three other projects. Critics praised his performance, with Mihir Bhanage of The Times of India stating that he "fits the part and channels the 'macho persona with a heart of gold' character well." The Week noted, "it is hard to shake off Adinath Kothare's shrewd politician persona which makes a hard impact. He embodies flamboyance and charisma with elan." The film was a commercial success, grossing ₹24 crore (US$2.6 million) at the worldwide box office, making it the fourth highest-grossing Marathi film of 2022. He earned nominations at Fakt Marathi Cine Sanman, Maharashtracha Favourite Kon? and his first Filmfare Marathi nomination for Best Actor.

He reunited with Dixit's production house once more for the 2024 horror-comedy Panchak, featured an ensemble cast that included Dilip Prabhavalkar, Bharati Achrekar, Anand Ingale and Tejashri Pradhan. The film revolves around a family struggling with superstitions and the fear of death. Panchak premiered at the Pune International Film Festival before its theatrical release. The film earned ₹4.19 crore (US$450,000) at the box office, achieving moderate commercial success. Critics praised Kothare's performance, with Keyur Seta for The Common Man Speaks noting, "Kothare is thoroughly impressive as a firm but affectionate Madhav." His second release of the year, Shaktiman, directed by Prakash Kunte, was a family drama centered on a couple navigating personal challenges. The Times of India critic Kalpeshraj Kubal remarked that the film rested on Kothare's shoulders, adding, "He delivers a relatable performance but the makers seem to have gotten carried away while trying to bring all the focus to his character." Kothare was nominated at the Aaryans Awards for Best Actor and Best Singer Male. Beyond films, Kothare played an inspector in Rohan Sippy’s legal drama series Criminal Justice: Adhura Sach (2022), and a strong-willed politician in City of Dreams – Season 2 (2023), directed by Nagesh Kukunoor. His performance in City of Dreams was met with acclaim, with both critics and audiences appreciating his screen presence and conviction.

Continuing his momentum, 2025 brought several noteworthy appearances, he starred as an ACP in Crime Beat, a drama centered on investigative journalism and crime reporting, inspired by Somnath Batabyal's 2013 novel The Price You Pay. Sumit Rajguru of Times Now praised his performance, writing, "Kothare looks convincing in the role of an emotionally charged cop. His sincere performance touches your heart." He also made a brief but memorable appearance in Netflix’s The Royals as a calculating money man, a role that drew positive attention. Also in that year, Kothare took on the spiritually significant role of Sant Namdev, widely known for his devotional abhangas in Digpal Lanjekar’s historical film Sant Dnyaneshwaranchi Muktai, where portrayal was well received and noted for its quiet depth and sincerity. In September 2025, Kothare returned to television in a leading role with Nashibvan on Star Pravah, a remake of the Tamil serial Nayagi, which he also produced under Kothare Vision. It concluded in April 2026 after a run of approximately seven months.

In 2026, Kothare appeared in Ashwiny Iyer Tiwari's legal drama System, released on Amazon Prime Video, alongside Sonakshi Sinha, Jyothika and Ashutosh Gowariker. In the film, which received mixed responses, he played Alok Rajvansh, the son of a celebrated defence lawyer and the brother of Sinha's character. He subsequently starred opposite Yami Gautam in the horror-comedy Nayyi Navelli, in which he played a man from Meerut whose newlywed wife is suspected of being a witch by his brother. For his transformation from Raja to Ravana in the film, Kothare underwent a daily four-hour transformation process for nearly 20 days. Although the film received negative reviews from critics, Kothare's performance was praised. Trisha Gaur of Koimoi remarked, "Kothare has a strong presence in the cast, and his chemistry with Yami is a big part of the film’s warmth." Kothare portrayed Bharata, a pivotal character in Nitesh Tiwari's mythological epic Ramayana: Part 1, which stars Ranbir Kapoor, Yash and Sai Pallavi. He confirmed his involvement in the film in July 2025.

== Other works and media image ==
Apart from his work in films and television, Kothare has also gained recognition for his style and public presence. He appeared in The Times of India's "Most Desirable Men of Maharashtra" list for four consecutive years, from 2017 to 2020, solidifying his status as a popular and influential personality. In 2022, he walked as the showstopper for Shruti Mangaaysh at Pune Times Fashion Week, sharing the runway with Amruta Khanvilkar.

=== Production ===
In 2008, Mahesh Kothare and Adinath Kothare established their production company, Kothare & Kothare Vision, now known as Kothare Vision Pvt. Ltd. Their first production under this banner was the film Full 3 Dhamaal. Before this, Mahesh Kothare had successfully produced films under the banner Jenma Films International, many of which he also directed, with some being distributed by Adinath Films Distributors. Kothare Vision later expanded into television production, beginning with the Marathi daily soap Man Udhan Varyache for Star Pravah. Their mythological series Jai Malhar for Zee Marathi became a milestone, breaking several TRP records. The production house continued to back successful mythological shows, including Vithu Mauli (2017–2020) and Ude Ga Ambe (2024). Among their other successful productions, the fantasy drama Sukh Mhanje Nakki Kay Asta! became one of the longest-running shows on the channel. In May 2022, the company also introduced a new banner, Storyteller’s Nook Pvt. Ltd., aimed at nurturing fresh and original storytelling ideas for a wider audience, under which it has also ventured into advertising and digital content, including the SonyLIV series Manvat Murders (2024).

== Personal life ==
Kothare met actress Urmila Kanetkar in the mid-2010s when she visited his home to meet his father, who was set to direct the Marathi film Shubhamangal Savdhan and wanted her to make her debut in the industry. He was working as an assistant director on the film when they started dating. After a few years of dating, they got married in 2011. In January 2018, the couple welcomed their daughter, Jiza Kothare. Their married life has frequently caught media attention, with fans and tabloids following their journey; with speculations surrounding their separation. On 16 July 2026, Kothare and Kanetkar announced their separation through a joint statement shared on social media, ending their fifteen-year-long marriage.

== Filmography ==
=== Films ===
Year	Title	Role	Actor	Director	Producer	Language	Notes	Ref.
1994	Majha Chakula	Adinath (Chakula)	Yes	No	No	Marathi	Child actor	
2003	Chimani Pakhar	—	No	No	No	Marathi	Assistant director	
2004	Pachadlela	—	No	No	No	Marathi	Assistant director	
2006	Khabardar	—	No	No	No	Marathi	Assistant director	
2008	Full 3 Dhamaal	—	No	No	Yes	Marathi		
2010	Ved Lavi Jeeva	Jagdish (Jaggu)	Yes	No	No	Marathi		
2011	Stand By	Rahul Narvekar	Yes	No	No	Marathi		
2011	Dubhang	Rohan Jadhav	Yes	No	No	Marathi		
2012	Satrangi Re	Rego	Yes	No	No	Marathi		
2013	Zapatlela 2	Aditya Bolke	Yes	No	Yes	Marathi		
2013	Rewind	Anurag	Yes	No	No	Hindi	Short film	
2014	Hello Nandan	Nandan	Yes	No	No	Marathi		
2014	Anvatt	Dr. Vinay	Yes	No	No	Marathi		
2014	Ishq Wala Love	Ajinkya	Yes	No	No	Marathi		
2014	Premasathi Coming Suun	Aditya	Yes	No	No	Marathi		
2014	The Judgement Day	Rohit Muzumdar	Yes	No	No	Marathi	Short film	
2014	Avatarachi Goshta	Amod	Yes	No	No	Marathi		
2015	Sata Lota Pan Sagla Khota	Jayvardhan	Yes	No	No	Marathi		
2015	Nilkanth Master	Vyankatesh	Yes	No	No	Marathi		
2018	Take Care Good Night	Gautam	Yes	No	No	Marathi		
2018	Perspective	Muslim guy	Yes	Yes	Yes	-	Short film	
2019	15th August	Amit Inamdar	Yes	No	No	Marathi	Netflix original	
2019	Paani	Hanumant Kendre	Yes	Yes	No	Marathi	Also lyricist	
2020	Shevanti	Rohan	Yes	No	No	Marathi	Short film	
2021	83	Dilip Vengsarkar	Yes	No	No	Hindi		
2022	Chandramukhi	Daulat Deshmane	Yes	No	No	Marathi		
2023	Shastry Viruddh Shastry	Jayesh Dave	Yes	No	No	Hindi		
2024	Panchak	Madhav Khot	Yes	No	No	Marathi		
2024	Shaktimaan	Siddharth	Yes	No	No	Marathi		
2025	Sant Dnyaneshwaranchi Muktai	Sant Namdev	Yes	No	No	Marathi		
2026	System	Alok Rajvansh	Yes	No	No	Hindi	Amazon Prime Video original	
2026	Nayyi Navelli	Raja Awasthi	Yes	No	No	Hindi		
2026	Ramayana: Part 1	Bharata	Yes	No	No	Hindi		
2026	Miranda Warning †	TBA	Yes	No	No	Marathi		
TBA	Gauri †	TBA	Yes	Yes	No	Marathi		
TBA	Bena †	TBA	Yes	No	No	Marathi		
TBA	Zapatlela 3 †	TBA	Yes	No	No	Marathi		

=== Television ===
Year	Title	Role	Channel	Actor	Producer	Ref.
2009–2011	Man Udhan Varyache		Star Pravah	No	Yes	
2011	Anolkhi Disha		Star Pravah	No	Yes	
2014–2017	Jai Malhar		Zee Marathi	No	Yes	
2015–2017	Ganpati Bappa Morya		Colors Marathi	No	Yes	
2016–2017	100 Days	PSI Ajay Thakur	Zee Marathi	Yes	No	
2017–2020	Vithu Mauli		Star Pravah	No	Yes	
2019	Ek Hoti Rajkanya		Sony Marathi	No	Yes	
2019–2020	Prem Poison Panga		Zee Yuva	No	Yes	
2020–2024	Sukh Mhanje Nakki Kay Asta!		Star Pravah	No	Yes	
2020–2021	Dakkhancha Raja Jotiba		Star Pravah	No	Yes	
2021–2022	Aai Mayecha Kavach		Colors Marathi	No	Yes	
2021	Pahile Na Mi Tula		Zee Marathi	No	Yes	
2022	Criminal Justice: Adhura Sach	Inspector Prashant Waghmare	Disney+ Hotstar	Yes	No	
2022–2024	Pinkicha Vijay Aso!		Star Pravah	No	Yes	
2023	City of Dreams	Mahesh Arawle	Disney+ Hotstar	Yes	No	
2023	Bajao	Omkar Gangwal (OG)	JioCinema	Yes	No	
2023	Nexa Journeys Presents Konkan Diaries	Host	Zee Zest	Yes	No	
2024	Manvat Murders		SonyLIV	No	Yes	
2024–present	Savlyachi Janu Savali		Zee Marathi	No	Yes	
2025	Crime Beat	ACP Mayank Sharma	ZEE5	Yes	No	
2025	The Royals	Zubin Daruwala	Netflix	Yes	No	
2025–2026	Nashibvan	Rudrapratap	Star Pravah	Yes	Yes	
2026	Detective Dhananjay: Rahasyajaal	Dhananjay	ZEE5	Yes	Yes	

== Awards and nominations ==
Year	Award	Category	Work	Result	Ref.
1995	Maharashtra State Film Awards	Best Child Artist	Majha Chakula	Won	
2011	Zee Chitra Gaurav Puraskar	Best Male Debut	Ved Laavi Jeeva	Nominated	
2011	Zee Chitra Gaurav Puraskar	Best Actor	Ved Laavi Jeeva	Nominated	
2014	Maharashtra State Film Awards	Best Actor	Avatarachi Goshta	Nominated	
2014	Zee Chitra Gaurav Puraskar	Best Actor	Avatarachi Goshta	Won	
2018	National Film Awards	Best Film on Environment Conservation/Preservation	Paani	Won	
2020	New York Indian Film Festival	Best Actor	Paani	Won	
2021	Star Pravah Parivaar Puraskar	Special Mention (Series)	Dakkhancha Raja Jotiba	Won	
2022	Fakt Marathi Cine Sanman	Best Actor in a Lead Role	Chandramukhi	Nominated	
2023	Maharashtracha Favourite Kon?	Favourite Actor	Chandramukhi	Nominated	
2023	Filmfare Awards Marathi	Best Actor	Chandramukhi	Nominated	
2023	Navarashtra Planet Marathi Film & OTT Awards	Best Actor	Chandramukhi	Nominated	
2025	City Cine Awards	Best Film	Paani	Won	
2025	City Cine Awards	Best Director	Paani	Nominated	
2025	City Cine Awards	Best Actor	Paani	Nominated	
2025	City Cine Awards	Best Lyricist	Paani (Paani – Title track)	Nominated	
2025	Aaryans Sanman	Best Actor	Shaktimaan	Nominated	
2025	Aaryans Sanman	Best Male Playback Singer	Shaktimaan	Nominated	
2025	Zee Chitra Gaurav Puraskar	Best Film	Paani	Won	
2025	Zee Chitra Gaurav Puraskar	Best Director	Paani	Won	
2025	Zee Chitra Gaurav Puraskar	Best Actor	Paani	Nominated	
2025	Zee Chitra Gaurav Puraskar	Best Lyricist	Paani	Won	
2025	Zee Chitra Gaurav Puraskar	Best Story (with Nitin Dixit)	Paani	Nominated	
2025	Zee Chitra Gaurav Puraskar	Best Editor (with Mayur Hardas)	Paani	Nominated	
2025	NDTV Marathi Entertainment Awards	Best Film	Paani	Won	
2025	NDTV Marathi Entertainment Awards	Best Director	Paani	Won	
2025	NDTV Marathi Entertainment Awards	Best Story (with Nitin Dixit)	Paani	Won	
2025	NDTV Marathi Entertainment Awards	Best Editor (with Mayur Hardas)	Paani	Won	
2025	MaTa Sanman	Best Film	Paani	Won	
2025	MaTa Sanman	Best Director	Paani	Won	
2025	MaTa Sanman	Best Actor	Paani	Nominated	
2025	MaTa Sanman	Best Lyricist	Paani	Nominated	
2025	MaTa Sanman	Best Editor (with Mayur Hardas)	Paani	Nominated	
2025	MaTa Sanman	Best Show	Savlyachi Janu Savali	Nominated	
2025	MaTa Sanman	Best Web Series	Manvat Murders	Nominated	
2025	Filmfare Awards Marathi	Best Film	Paani	Won	
2025	Filmfare Awards Marathi	Best Film Critics	Paani	Nominated	
2025	Filmfare Awards Marathi	Best Director	Paani	Won	
2025	Filmfare Awards Marathi	Best Director Debut	Paani	Nominated	
2025	Filmfare Awards Marathi	Best Actor	Paani	Nominated	
2025	Filmfare Awards Marathi	Best Actor Critics	Paani	Nominated	
2025	Filmfare Awards Marathi	Best Editing (with Mayur Hardas)	Paani	Won	

== See also ==
- List of Marathi film actors
