= Panchak =

2023 Marathi-language film

- Theatrical release poster
- Directed by: Rahul Awate; Jayant Jathar
- Written by: Rahul Awate; Jayant Jathar
- Produced by: Madhuri Dixit-Nene; Dr. Shriram Nene
- Starring: Adinath Kothare; Dilip Prabhavalkar; Bharati Achrekar; Anand Ingale; Tejashri Pradhan; Satish Alekar; Nandita Patkar
- Cinematography: Pooja Gupte
- Edited by: Jayant Jathar
- Music by: Mangesh Dhakde
- Production company: RnM Moving Pictures
- Release dates: 5 February 2023 (PIFF); 5 January 2024
- Running time: 137 minutes
- Country: India
- Language: Marathi
- Budget: est.₹3 crore
- Box office: est.₹4.19 crore

Panchak (transl. Quintet) is a 2023 Indian Marathi language comedy drama film written and directed by Rahul Awate and Jayant Jathar and produced by Madhuri Dixit-Nene along with her husband, Dr. Shriram Nene, under RnM Moving Pictures. The film features an ensemble cast of Adinath Kothare, Dilip Prabhavalkar, Bharati Achrekar, Anand Ingale, Tejashri Pradhan, Satish Alekar, Nandita Patkar, Sampada Kulkarni and Deepti Devi. The story revolves around a family with a fear of superstition and death.

It was released theatrically on 5 January 2024.

== Cast ==
- Dilip Prabhavalkar as Anant Khot aka Bhau
- Adinath Kothare as Madhav Khot; Anant's younger son
- Tejashri Pradhan as Revati Khot; Madhav's wife
- Bharati Achrekar as Uttara Khot; Anant's sister
- Satish Alekar as Bal Khot; Anant's elder brother
- Anand Ingale as Aatmaram Khot; Anant's elder son
- Nandita Patkar as Kaveri Khot; as Aatmaram's wife
- Sagar Talashikar as Dr. Ajay Khot; Bal's elder son
- Sampada Kulkarni as Anuya Khot; Ajay's wife
- Ashish Kulkarni as Vijay Khot; Bal's younger son
- Deepti Devi as Veena Khot; Vijay's wife
- Vidyadhar Joshi as Joshi Guruji
- Ganesh Mayekar as Bhagya Khot; Khot's house helper
- Aarti Wadagbalkar as Namrata Khot; Bhagya's wife
- Anil Gawade as Shivalkar; Villager
- Tejas Kulkarni as Shivalkar's son

== Production ==
The film was announced by Dixit on 10 October 2019, along with the Mahurat shoot. This was the second Marathi film she produced after 15th August. Panchak is shot in Konkan, Maharashtra. Kothare revealed that he was not the first choice for the part, but Dixit chose him.

== Soundtrack ==
The lyrics are written by Guru Thakur and the music is composed by Mangesh Dhakde.

Track listing
No.	Title	Singer(s)	Length
1.	"Panchak Title Song"	Suhas Sawant	2:38
2.	"Chamatkar"	Abhijeet Kosambi	3:58

== Release and reception ==
Panchak had its premiere at 21st Pune International Film Festival on 5 February 2023, where it received a standing ovation from the audience. The official title poster and the release date were released by the makers in the mid-October. The teaser was released on 1 December 2023, subsequently, the trailer was released on 12 December 2023. The trailer garnered a great response from the audience, and Bollywood stars Kajol, Riteish Deshmukh, Shilpa Shetty, Karan Johar, and others praised it.

Nandini Ramnath from Scroll.in wrote "Dilip Prabhavalkar mercifully lingers on even after his passing in the form of flashbacks. The rest of the cast perform efficiently, with Nandita Patkar noteworthy as the easily susceptible Kaveri". Reshma Raikwar from Loksatta says "Due to the depiction in Konkan and the humorous arrangement, the movie 'Panchak' feels good, but the thought that it could have been made better with all these forces does not remain in the mind". Mihir Bhanage from The Times of India wrote "The comedy track of Shobhraj and Bullet Prakash is excellent. Vijay Kaundinya shows signs of becoming a villain of the future. Music by Saikarthik has good tunes. Venus Murthy’s cinematography is a treat". Devendra Jadhav from Sakal wrote "The first to mention is Dilip Prabhavalkar. Dilipkak has done a great job despite playing a very small role. Their demeanor makes the atmosphere pleasant".
