= Jayant Jathar =

Indian film editor

- Occupations: Film editor; director
- Years active: 2010–present

Jayant Jathar is an Indian film editor and director who predominantly works in Marathi film industry. His directorial debut is the 2024 film Panchak.

== Filmography ==
=== Film ===
Key
†	Denotes films that have not yet been released

Year	Film	Notes	Ref(s)
2010	Natarang	First feature film	
2013	Balak-Palak		
2014	Timepass		
2014	Yellow	Nominated for Filmfare Award for Best Editing – Marathi 2014	
2014	Dusari Goshta		
2014	Bhakarkhadi 7 km		
2014	Rama Madhav		
2014	Vitti Dandu		
2014	Happy Journey		
2015	Timepass 2		
2015	3:56 Killari		
2016	Laal Ishq		
2016	Family Katta		
2016	Galbat		
2017	Shentimental	Nominated for Filmfare Award for Best Editing – Marathi (2017)	
2017	Kaccha Limbu		
2018	Home Sweet Home		
2019	Womenly Voices	TV series; Hindi film	
2019	The Relationship Agreement	TV series; Hindi film	
2020	Darbaan	Hindi film	
2021	Preetam		
2022	Zombivli		
2022	Y		
2022	Timepass 3		
2023	Jaggu Ani Juliet		
2023	Butterfly		
2024	Panchak	Directorial debut	
2026	Adkitta		
TBA	Mahaparinirvaan †		

=== Television ===
Year	Title	Notes	Ref(s)
2018	Naammtra		
