= 100 Days (2016 TV series) =

Marathi-language crime series

- Genre: Thriller; Crime
- Written by: Santosh Ayachit; Dialogues: Pralhad Kudtarkar
- Directed by: Amol Bidkar; Vighnesh Kambali
- Starring: See below
- Voices of: Harshdeep Kaur
- Composer: Pankaj Padghan
- Country of origin: India
- Original language: Marathi
- No. of episodes: 101

Production
- Producers: Santosh Ayachit; Sunil Bhosale
- Camera setup: Multi-camera
- Running time: 22 minutes
- Production company: Creative Vision

Original release
- Network: Zee Marathi
- Release: 24 October 2016 – 17 February 2017

100 Days is a Marathi-language television crime series that aired on Zee Marathi. The show starred Tejaswini Pandit, Adinath Kothare and Ramesh Bhatkar in the lead roles. The series premiered from 24 October 2016 by replacing Ratris Khel Chale.

== Plot ==
The story revolves Rani and PSI Ajay Thakur. It's a murder mystery where Rani's husband Dhananjay gets murdered. PSI Ajay Thakur is a investigating officer who takes the charge of investigation for this murder.

== Cast ==
- Tejaswini Pandit as Rani Dhananjay Sardesai
- Adinath Kothare as PSI Ajay Thakur
- Ramesh Bhatkar as Dhananjay Sardesai
- Seema Chandekar as Sunita Thakur
- Ashwini Mukadam as Rani's maid
- Archana Nipankar as Neha, Ajay's girlfriend
- Siddheshwar Zadbuke as Sharad
- Milind Safai as Sardesai's friend
- Abhishek Chavan as Rani's boyfriend
