= Vithu Mauli =

Marathi-language television series

- Genre: Mythology
- Written by: Santosh Ayachit
- Directed by: Avinash Waghmare
- Starring: See below
- Theme music composer: Chaitanya Aadakar
- Opening theme: "Vithu Mauli" by Adarsh Shinde
- Country of origin: India
- Original language: Marathi
- No. of episodes: 783

Production
- Producers: Mahesh Kothare; Adinath Kothare
- Production location: Mumbai
- Cinematography: Rupesh Tatkari
- Editor: Milind Narkar
- Camera setup: Multi-camera
- Running time: 22 minutes
- Production company: Kothare Vision

Original release
- Network: Star Pravah
- Release: 30 October 2017 – 22 March 2020

Vithu Mauli is an Indian Marathi-language drama series televised on Star Pravah and produced by Mahesh Kothare and Adinath Kothare, under Kothare Vision. The TV series is a biographical epic of the Hindu deity Vithoba, based on mythological legends of him found in Hindu folklore. It aired for two seasons, launching on 30 October 2017 and ended on 22 March 2020. The show was acclaimed in Indian media for its gripping dramatic storytelling and use of special effects.

== Plot and Themes ==
The show centers around the life of Vithoba (who is considered an avatar of the Hindu deity Vishnu representing the value of compassion) and his rise as a beloved deity. A key focus is Vithoba's relationship with his loyal devotee Pundalik, highlighting their actions in establishing the town of Pandharpur, Maharashtra and leading to its flourishing as a sacred and spiritual center for pilgrimages. Pundalik is portrayed as performing righteous deeds, such as charity, that promote unity and empathy among the town's residents. His work is also attribute to drawing many visitors who heard stories of the town's attractive character and divine influence.

The series also explores Vithoba's relationship with his three wives, the goddesses Rakhumai, Rahimai and Satyabhama, who collectively are depicted as personifying love and devotion as they bring holiness and devotion to the city. Rakhumai, embodying grace and wisdom, is presented as a city leader to help it prosper and navigate challenges. Rahimai is portrayed as a teacher of equality and kindness to the city's residents. Satyabhama is shown to be the catalyst for celebratory festivals bringing joy and a sense of togetherness.

The series' primary antagonist is the Kali Asur, the Hindu goddess of death and destruction. Key themes explored in the show include faith, devotion, sympathy and divine intervention.

== Cast ==
=== Main ===
- Ajinkya Raut as Vithoba / Vishnu
- Ekta Labde as Rakhumai / Mahalakshmi / AdiParasakti / Durga / Mahakali / Lakhubai
- Pooja Katurde as Radha / Rahi
- Bageshree Nimbalkar as Satyabhama

=== Recurring Characters ===
- Mahesh Phalke as Kali Asur
- Atharva Karve as Pundalik
- Amrut Gaikwad / Sanket Korlekar as Namdev
- Tejas Dongre as Ganesha
- Divesh Medge as Saint
- Revati Lele as Mandakini
- Madhavi Soman as Pundalik's mother
- Milind Safai as Pundalik's father
- Sakshi Mahajan as Kusum; Pundalik's wife
- Sachin Bodhe as Villager
