= Pinkicha Vijay Aso! =

Marathi-language TV series

- Genre: Drama; Comedy
- Written by: Sameer Garud
- Starring: See below
- Country of origin: India
- Original language: Marathi
- No. of episodes: 736

Production
- Producers: Mahesh Kothare; Adinath Kothare
- Camera setup: Multi-camera
- Running time: 22 minutes
- Production company: Kothare Vision

Original release
- Network: Star Pravah
- Release: 31 January 2022 – 26 May 2024

Related
- Nimki Mukhiya

Pinkicha Vijay Aso! (transl. Hail Pinki!) is an Indian Marathi language television series that premiered on 31 January 2022 on Star Pravah and ended on 26 May 2024. It starred Sharayu Sonawane and Vijay Andalkar in lead roles. It is produced by Mahesh Kothare and Adinath Kothare under Kothare Vision. It is an official remake of Hindi TV series Nimki Mukhiya.

== Plot ==
A bit quirky, a bit naive but extremely smart, Pinky becomes the first female Sarpanch of her village.

== Cast ==
=== Main ===
- Sharayu Sonawane / Aarti More as Pinki Yuvraj Dhonde-Patil
- Vijay Andalkar as Yuvraj Gajraj Dhonde-Patil

=== Recurring ===
- Asha Shelar-Chandorkar as Sushila "Aaisaheb" Gajraj Dhonde-Patil
- Sunil Tawade as Gajraj "Bapusaheb" Dhonde-Patil
- Amita Khopkar / Charusheela Vachhani as Maaisaheb Dhonde-Patil
- Kunaal Dhumal as Jambuvant Jambhale / Sangram Shantaram Jagdale
- Adhokshaj Karhade as Banti
- Kishori Shahane as Dr. Devyani Sadavarte
- Piyush Ranade as Sameer
- Surekha Kudachi as Surekha
- Saisha Salvi as Ovi
- Divesh Medge as Dolby Gajraj Dhonde-Patil
- Atul Kaswa as Mahadu Chamkore
- Sarika Salunkhe as Niri Dolby Dhonde-Patil / Niri Mahadu Chamkore
- Shantanu Gangane as Satyashil "Satya" Gajraj Dhonde-Patil
- Ramesh Rokade as Shantaram Jagdale
- Dakshata Joil as Rupa
- Rohini Naik
- Ankita Joshi as Chhabi
- Harshad Naybal as Deepak Mahadu Chamkhore
- Swapnil Ajgaonkar

=== Guest Appearances ===
- Surekha Punekar as Herself

== Adaptations ==
Language	Title	Original Release	Network(s)	Last aired	Notes
Hindi	Nimki Mukhiya निमकी मुखिया	28 August 2017	Star Bharat	10 August 2019	Original
Tamil	Thaenmozhi B.A தேன்மொழி பி.ஏ	26 August 2019	Star Vijay	13 November 2021	Remake
Marathi	Pinkicha Vijay Aso! पिंकीचा विजय असो!	31 January 2022	Star Pravah	26 May 2024	Remake
Kannada	Jailalitha ಜಯಲಲಿತಾ	8 December 2025	Star Suvarna	Ongoing	Remake
