= Lagnachi Bedi =

Indian television series (2022-2024)

- Genre: Family drama
- Created by: Sumeet Hukamchand Mittal; Shashi Mittal
- Written by: Olivea Dey, Prashant Rathi, Ananya Patnayak
- Directed by: Nishant Surve
- Starring: See below
- Theme music composer: Nilesh Moharir
- Country of origin: India
- Original language: Marathi
- No. of episodes: 913

Production
- Producers: Shashi Mittal; Sumeet Mittal
- Cinematography: Vinayak Jadhav
- Editor: Lalsahab Yadav
- Camera setup: Multi-camera
- Running time: 22 minutes
- Production company: Shashi Sumeet Productions

Original release
- Network: Star Pravah
- Release: 31 January 2022 – 15 December 2024

Related
- Kusum Dola

Lagnachi Bedi (transl. Handcuffs of Marriage) is an Indian Marathi language television series which premiered from 31 January 2022 aired on Star Pravah. It stars Sayali Deodhar, Sanket Pathak and Revati Lele in lead roles. The show is produced by Shashi Sumeet Productions and it is loosely based on Star Jalsha's Kusum Dola.

== Plot ==
In the quaint town, Sindhu, a kind-hearted girl and recent medical graduate, dreams of becoming a surgeon in Mumbai. Across the story, she meet Raghav, a guy aiming to be a police officer, coming from a big family with lots of different thoughts.

Raghav and Rani start liking each other during a trip. But, life throws a curveball, and Vikram loses contact with Rani because of a lost phone. Feeling hurt, Rani ends up getting engaged to Raghav's brother, Raya.

As life goes on, Sindhu faces a tragic loss—her father dies in a police operation gone wrong, all tangled up with Raghav. Feeling that Raghav is somehow responsible for her dad's death, Sindhu tries to take her own life. The villagers then push Raghav into marrying Sindhu to take care of her future. But, they don't warm up to each other as a married couple.

The story unfolds further, depicting Sindhu's life in Raghav's big family with its own mix of characters. Slowly, love starts to bloom between Sindhu and Raghav. They decide to get married again. But, of course, life isn't a smooth ride—Raghav's enemies create trouble, even attempting harm to Sindhu, testing their relationship at every turn.

== Cast ==
=== Main ===
- Sayali Deodhar as Dr. Sindhu Sawant Ratnaparkhi / Krushna (Fake Identity) – Janardan's daughter; Raghav's wife; Ankur and Savi's mother; Vishal's ex-fiancée (2022–2024)
- Sanket Pathak as IPS Raghav Ratnaparkhi – Rajshree and Ratnakar's son; Rakhi, Raya and Rishabh's cousin; Sindhu's husband; Madhurani's former love interest; Ankur and Savi's father(2022–2024)
- Revati Lele as Madhurani "Rani" Deshpande Adhikari – Vibhavari and Manohar's daughter; Raya's widow; Raghav's former love interest; Ankur's surrogate mother (2022–2024) (Dead)

=== Recurring ===
- Swarali Khomane as Savi Ratnaparkhi – Sindhu and Raghav's daughter; Ankur's sister; Anvi's cousin (2023–2024)
- Samar Birje as Ankur "Vinayak" Ratnaparkhi – Sindhu and Raghav's son; Madhurani's surrogate son; Savi's brother; Anvi's cousin (2023–2024)
- Siddhesh Prabhakar as Raya Adhikari – Rohini's son; Rakhi, Raghav and Rishabh's cousin; Madhurani's husband (2022–2023) (Dead)
- Sumukhi Pendse / Supriya Vinod as Rukmini Ratnaparkhi – Matriarch of Ratnaparkhis'; Rakhi's mother; Anvi's grandmother (2022–2023)/(2023–2024)
- Milind Adhikari as Ratnakar Ratnaparkhi – Rohini, Ruturaj and Rajani's brother; Rajshree's husband; Raghav's father; Ankur and Savi's grandfather (2022–2024)
- Rasika Dhamankar as Rajshree Ratnaparkhi – Ratnakar's wife; Raghav's mother; Ankur and Savi's grandmother (2022–2024)
- Ajay Padhye as Ruturaj Ratnaparkhi – Rohini, Ratnakar and Rajani's brother; Rutuja's husband; Rishabh's father (2022–2024)
- Sushma Murudkar as Rutuja Ratnaparkhi – Ruturaj's wife; Rishabh's mother (2022–2024)
- Minal Bal as Rajani Ratnaparkhi – Rohini, Ratnakar and Ruturaj's sister; Rajiv's wife (2022–2023)
- Madhuri Bharati as Rakhi Ratnaparkhi Joshi – Rukmini's daughter; Raya, Raghav and Rishabh's cousin; Yogesh's wife; Anvi's mother (2022–2023)
- Suprit Kadam as Yogesh Joshi – Rakhi's husband; Anvi's father; Sindhu's professor (2022–2023)
- Vaishnavi Karmarkar as Anvi Joshi Awate – Rakhi and Yogesh's daughter; Ankur and Savi's cousin; Ayush's wife (2023–2024)
  - Tanishka Mhadse as Child Anvi Joshi (2022–2023)
- Aditya Pharate as Ayush Awate – Shakuntala's son; Anvi's husband (2023–2024)
- Gandhar Kharpudikar as Rishabh Ratnaparkhi – Ruturaj and Rutuja's son; Rakhi, Raya and Raghav's cousin; Reshma's husband (2022–2024)
- Amruta Malwadkar as Reshma Ratnaparkhi – Rishabh's wife (2023–2024)
- Harsha Gupta as Rohini Ratnaparkhi – Ratnakar, Ruturaj and Rajani's sister; Raya's mother (2022–2023)
- Shreyas Raje as Kanta Mane – A local goon; Vitthal's son; Sindhu's obsessive lover (2022)
- Vidyadhar Joshi as Janardan Sawant – Shakuntala's foster brother; Sindhu's father; Ankur and Savi's grandfather; Raghav's former trainer (2022; 2023) (Dead) (Appears only in flashbacks after 2022)
- Sanjeevani Jadhav as Shakuntala Sawant – Janardan's foster sister; Sindhu's caretaker (2022–2023)
- Satish Agashe as Manohar Deshpande – Vibhavari's husband; Madhurani's father (2022–2023)
- Smita Shah as Vibhavari Deshpande – Manohar's wife; Madhurani's mother (2022-2024)
- Tushar Sali as Mangesh – Sindhu's friend and well-wisher
- Sandeep Gaikwad as Vishal Karnik – Sindhu's ex-fiancé (2022)
- Aditi Deshpande as Shakuntala Awate – Ayush's mother; Rukmini's rival (2023–2024)
- Sanjay Shejwal as Sada (2024)

=== Guest appearance ===
- Harshada Khanvilkar as Saundarya Inamdar from Rang Majha Vegla
