= Aamhi Asu Ladke =

Amhi Asu Laadke
- Theatrical release poster
- Directed by: Abhiram Bhadkamkar
- Produced by: Abhiram Bhadkamkar; Amita Ambekar; Hemant Patil
- Starring: Neena Kulkarni; Dr. Girish Oak; Subodh Bhave; Jyoti Subhash; Smita Survade
- Music by: Ashok Patki
- Distributed by: Everest Entertainment Pvt. Ltd.
- Release date: 14 December 2005
- Country: India
- Language: Marathi

Amhi Asu Laadke is a Marathi film released on 14 December 2005.

== Cast ==
The film stars Neena Kulkarni, Dr. Girish Oak, Subhodh Bhave, Jyoti Subhash, Smita Survade & Others.

== Soundtrack ==
The music has been directed by Ashok Patki while the lyrics have been written by Suresh Bhatt.

=== Track listing ===
No.	Title	Length
1.	"Asech He Kase Base"	5:34
