= Vitti Dandu =

- Theatrical release poster
- Directed by: Ganesh Kadam
- Written by: Vikas Kadam
- Produced by: Ajay Devgn; Leena Deore; Pravin Patil
- Starring: Dilip Prabhavalkar; Mrunal Thakur; Ashok Samarth; Ravindra Mankani
- Cinematography: Shailesh Avasthi
- Edited by: Jayant Jathar
- Music by: Santosh Mulekar
- Production company: Raj Radha Movies
- Distributed by: Ajay Devgn FFilms
- Release date: 21 November 2014
- Running time: 11 minutes
- Country: India
- Language: Marathi

Vitti Dandu is a 2014 Indian Marathi-language film directed by Ganesh Kadam and produced by Ajay Devgn and Leena Deore. The film marks a debut production of Ajay Devgn FFilms in Marathi. The film was theatrically released on 21 November 2014, featured Dilip Prabhavalkar, Mrunal Thakur, Ashok Samarth, Ravindra Mankani.

== Plot ==
The story revolves primarily around Daaji (Dilip Prabhavalkar) and his grandson, Govind (Nishant Bhavsar). Daaji narrates the story as a flashback from the present day as a grandfather (Ravindra Mankani) to his grandson (Shubhankar Atre). The story takes place in 1947 in Mor-gaon, a laid-back hamlet, just six days before the Indian Independence Day. During that time communication was slow and the news took over a week to reach other villages.

The film was shot in different locations across western Maharashtra and was produced by Bollywood actor Ajay Devgan, with Leena Deore alongside Pravin Patil as co-producers.

== Cast ==
- Dilip Prabhavalkar as Daaji
- Ashok Samarth as Bapu Patil
- Yatin Karyekar as Usman Chacha
- Nishant Bhavsar as Govind
- Mrunal Thakur as Sandhya
- Vikas Kadam as Vasant
- Utpal Sawant as Rajaram

== Release ==
The film was released on 21 November 2014 on 260 screenings across the state of Maharashtra By Ajay Devgn FFilms.

== Reception ==
The film has an average critics' rating of 2.9 and an average user rating of 3.9. The movie received awards for Best Cinematography and Best Marathi Film.

== Box office ==
The film collected a total of ₹90 million, with ₹12.5 million on its first day and ₹13 million on its second day.

== Soundtrack ==
Vitti Dandu

Soundtrack album by Santosh Mulekar
- Released: 23 October 2014
- Genre: Feature film soundtrack
- Length: 22:58
- Language: Marathi
- Label: DRJ Records

Santosh Mulekar composed the film's music, while Shrirang Godbole and Aashay Parab wrote the lyrics.

The single "Bheduni Hi Jau (Vande Mataram)" was released on Indian Independence Day. Singer Papon made his debut in Marathi Cinema with the song "Pahuni Ghe Re Saare".

No.	Title	Singer(s)	Length
1	"Aho Karbhari"	Sunidhi Chauhan	3:29
2	"Bheduni Hi Jau" (Vande Mataram)	Shankar Mahadevan, Anvesha	4:11
3	"Pahuni Ghe Re Saare"	Papon	3:47
4	"Chalaa Kheluya Vitti Daandoo"	Meghna Mishra	3:41
5	"Gela Maza English Sasara"	Manvel Gaikwad, Pandharith Kamble	4:36
6	"San Sanuni Marla Tola"	Udesh Umap	3:05
