= Swamini =

2019 Marathi-language Historical TV series

- Genre: Historical
- Starring: See below
- Country of origin: India
- Original language: Marathi
- No. of episodes: 312

Production
- Producers: Rugvedi Pradhan; Viren Pradhan
- Camera setup: Multi-camera
- Running time: 22 minutes
- Production companies: Uphoria Productions; Piccolo Films

Original release
- Network: Colors Marathi
- Release: 9 September 2019 – 26 December 2020

Swamini (transl. Mistress) is an Indian Marathi language historical TV series which aired on Colors Marathi. The show starred Aishwarya Narkar, Srushti Pagare, Revati Lele, and Chinmay Patwardhan in lead roles. The series premiered from 9 September 2019 and ended on 26 December 2020.

== Plot ==
The stoic pride of a Peshwa family, the tenderness of a forgotten love story. The dramatic life of Rama, the newest bride in the Peshwa household.

== Cast ==
=== Main ===
- Srushti Pagare as child Ramabai
  - Revati Lele as elder Ramabai
- Chinmay Patwardhan as Madhavrao
- Aishwarya Narkar as Gopikabai

=== Recurring ===
- Neena Kulkarni as Queen Tarabai
- Amol Bawdekar as Peshwa Nanasaheb
- Shripad Panse as Raghunath Rao
- Rohini Hattangadi as Kashibai
- Sanika Banaraswale as Jankibai
- Kunjika Kalwint as Anandibai
- Rugvedi Pradhan as Savitribai
- Surabhi Bhave-Damle
- Abhishek Rahalkar as Sadashivrao Bhau
- Uma Pendharkar as Parvatibai
- Sujit Deshpande as Vishwasrao
- Anushree Phadnis as Laxmibai
- Satish Salagare as Sakharam Bapu Bokil
- Anil Gawas as Santaji
- Gururaj Avadhani as Balkrishna Shastri
- Sanyogita Bhave
