= Mrunal Thakur =

Indian actress (born 1992)

- Thakur in 2026
- Born: 1 August 1992 (age 34); Dhule, Maharashtra, India
- Occupation: Actress
- Years active: 2012–present

Mrunal Thakur (born 1 August 1992) is an Indian actress who predominantly works in Hindi and Telugu films. Thakur is a recipient of several accolades including a Filmfare Award South, a Filmfare OTT Award, three SIIMA Awards and an ITA Award.

Thakur began her acting career in television, starring in the soap operas Mujhse Kuchh Kehti...Yeh Khamoshiyaan (2012) and Kumkum Bhagya (2014–2016), which earned her the ITA Award for Best Actress in a Supporting Role. Thakur made her Hindi film debut with Love Sonia (2018) and subsequently played the female lead in Super 30 (2019) and Batla House (2019), both of which were box-office successes. After a series of commercial failures, Thakur gained popularity with the successful Telugu romantic dramas Sita Ramam (2022) and Hi Nanna (2023). This was followed by several poorly received films.

== Early life ==
Mrunal Thakur was born on 1 August 1992 to a Marathi-speaking family in Dhule, Maharashtra. She attended St. Joseph's Convent School, Jalgaon, and Vasant Vihar High School, near Mumbai. Thakur left KC College without graduating as she was pursuing a television career at the time of studying.

== Career ==
=== Early television career (2012–2016) ===
While attending college, Thakur landed a lead role as Gauri Bhosle opposite Mohit Sehgal in the Star Plus series Mujhse Kuchh Kehti...Yeh Khamoshiyaan. The show aired from 2012 to 2013. Later in 2013, Thakur appeared in an episodic appearance on the mystery thriller Har Yug Mein Aayega Ek – Arjun, in which she played a journalist named Sakshi Anand.

In February 2014, She was cast for Zee TV's soap opera Kumkum Bhagya, for which she began shooting the following month. The show, co-starring Sriti Jha, Shabir Ahluwalia, Arjit Taneja, and Supriya Shukla, started airing on 15 April, and saw Thakur portray Bulbul Arora Khanna, a woman who along with her elder sister (played by Jha) helps their mother (played by Shukla) run a marriage hall. The show received mostly positive to mixed reviews from critics. Thakur quit the show in January 2016.

She appeared as a Contestant on Box Cricket League 1 in 2014 and Nach Baliye 7 in 2015. In 2016, she danced in a special episode of &TV's Saubhagyalakshmi, and had a guest appearance in Tuyul & Mbak Yul Reborn. Her final appearance before she retired from television was on the Indonesian serial Nadin, where she played Tara.

=== Expansion to films and further work (2014–2021) ===
Thakur made her film debut with the Marathi film Hello Nandan (2014), in which she played the role of Rubi, followed by another Marathi film Vitti Dandu (2014), where she portrayed Sandhya. Her next Marathi film was Surajya, where she played the role of Dr. Swapna. In 2016, Thakur began work on her first Hindi project, the international film Love Sonia, for which she stayed at Kolkata. The film was released in September 2018 after various delays and featured her in the titular role of a village girl who brings to light the issue of global human trafficking. For preparation, Thakur stayed at a brothel to study the body language of prostitutes. Although the film was generally well reviewed, it was a failure at the domestic box office.

Thakur's Bollywood debut came in 2019 with Vikas Bahl's biographical drama Super 30, narrating the story of mathematician Anand Kumar (played by Hrithik Roshan in the film) and his educational program of the same name, in which she portrayed Supriya, a classical dancer and Kumar's love interest. It emerged as a commercial success and one of the top-grossing Hindi films of 2019. In the same year, she played John Abraham's wife Nandita Kumar in Nikkhil Advani's Batla House, based on the 2008 Batla House encounter case. It grossed over ₹1.11 billion (US$12 million) worldwide, becoming a commercially successful venture.

In 2020, Thakur appeared in a Netflix venture, the four-part anthology horror film Ghost Stories as Ira in Karan Johar's segment. The same year she appeared in a music video "Gallan Goriya", alongside John Abraham. In 2021, Thakur starred in the sports drama, Toofaan, directed by Rakeysh Omprakash Mehra and co-starring Farhan Akhtar, which premiered on 16 July 2021 on Amazon Prime Video. In addition, she co-starred in the action thriller Dhamaka, directed by Ram Madhvani and co-starring Kartik Aaryan and Amruta Subhash, which released on Netflix on 19 November 2021. She also appeared in two music videos in the year 2021, "Bad Boy x Bad Girl" with Badshah and "Aise Na Chhoro" with Guru Randhawa.

=== Success in Telugu films and fluctuations (2022–present) ===
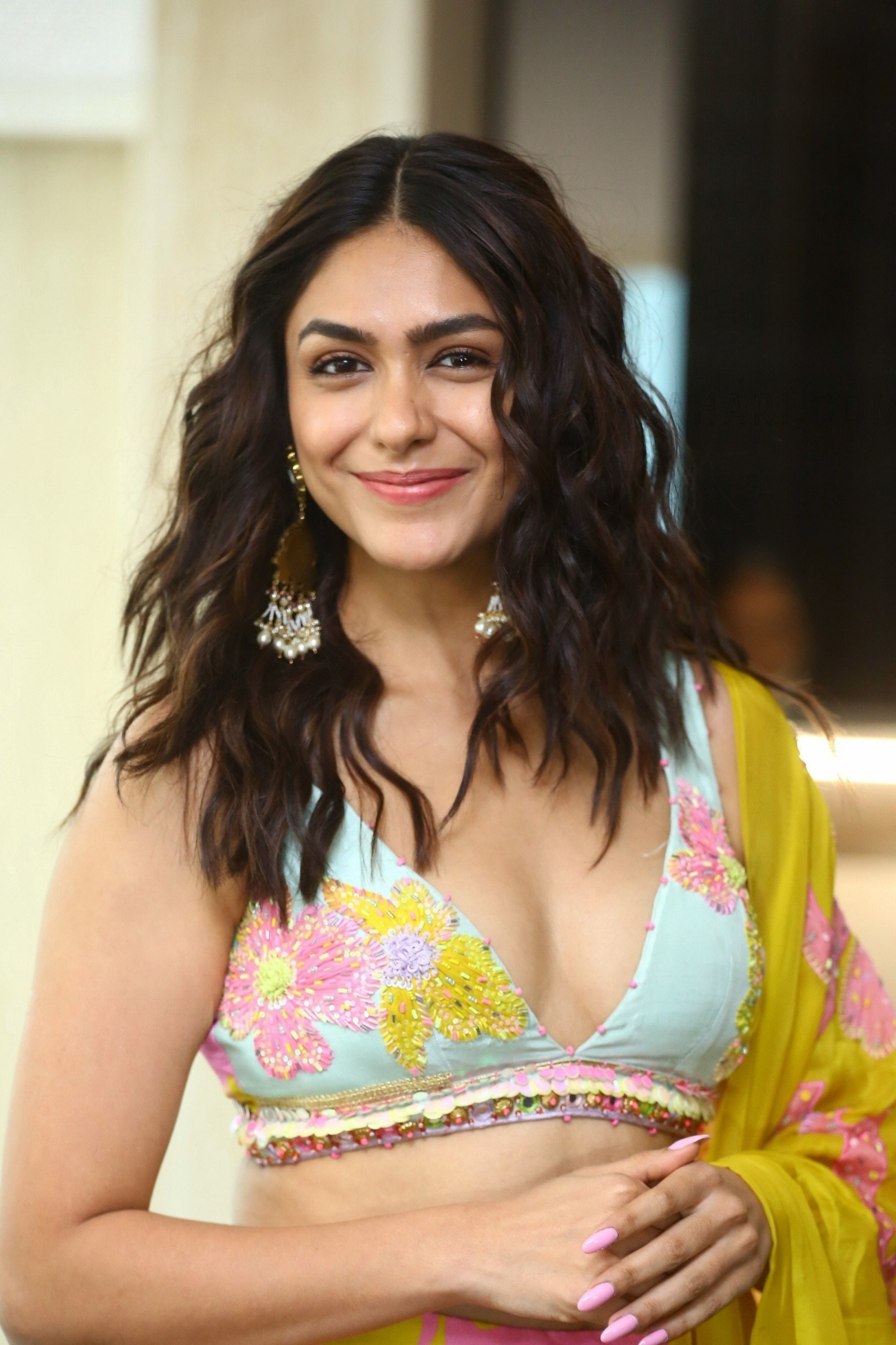
Thakur at an event for Sita Ramam in 2022

The sports drama Jersey, a remake of the 2019 Telugu film of the same name, co-starring Shahid Kapoor, finally released in 2022 after getting delayed multiple times due to COVID-19 pandemic. Thakur co-starred with Shahid Kapoor in the film, which received mixed to positive reviews but was a commercial failure at the box office. Thakur made her Telugu film debut opposite Dulquer Salmaan in Hanu Raghavapudi's period romantic drama Sita Ramam (2022). The film received positive reviews and emerged as blockbuster at the box office, with her character Sita Mahalakshmi gaining praise from the viewers and critics. Her performance earned her several awards and nominations, and won her the Filmfare Award for Best Actress – Telugu.

Thakur had five releases in 2023, the first four being Hindi films. Gumraah and Aankh Micholi were both commercial failures at the box office, while Lust Stories 2 and the Ishaan Khatter starrer war action film Pippa were released digitally. Pippa received praise from both audience and critics, with Thakur's performance receiving praise from the audience. In her last 2023 release, Thakur starred in the Telugu romance Hi Nanna opposite Nani, which received positive reviews, with her characters Yashna/Varsha getting praise from the critics and viewers . It was a superhit at the box office. Her performance in Hi Nanna received several awards and nominations, including winning the Best Actress Critics – Telugu. at South Indian International Movie Awards.

In 2024, Thakur appeared in her third Telugu film, The Family Star, opposite Vijay Deverakonda. She played Indu, an anthropology student working on her thesis who is also an entrepreneur. The film received mixed to negative reviews from critics and was a commercial failure at the box office . Thakur made a cameo appearance as Divya in the sci-fi epic Kalki 2898 AD. In 2025, Thakur played a Pakistani dancer Rabia in the comedy film Son of Sardaar 2 co-starring with Ajay Devgn. The film received mixed reviews from critics and viewers and was a commercial failure at the box office.

In her first release of 2026, she starred in a romantic drama film Do Deewane Seher Mein with Siddhant Chaturvedi. The film received mixed reviews from critics. Writing from Deepa Gahlot of Rediff and Shubhra Gupta of The Indian Express both panned the film and opined, "Thakur's character struggles with insecurity and unflattering glasses "in a dull", slow-paced film with lacking humor and "genuine romantic tension". Thakur then appeared in Hindi-Telugu bilingual Dacoit: A Love Story co-starring with Adivi Sesh. The film received mixed reviews from critics. Her performance received praise from critics. Then, Thakur starred alongside Varun Dhawan and Pooja Hegde in the romantic comedy Hai Jawani Toh Ishq Hona Hai. Later that year, crime thriller film Pooja Meri Jaan, which she had finished shooting alongside Huma Qureshi in 2022, premiered directly on ZEE5 on 2 October 2026 and became her last release of the year. All of her three 2026 theatrical releases failed commercially.

== Media image ==
The Telegraph finds Thakur to be "honest and heartwarming". On her choice of films, she said, "I just want to be associated with good scripts, to play woman of substance, and see what she's contributing to." Thakur ranked 8th in Eastern Eye's Top 30 under 30 Global Asian Stars List of 2021. In 2022, Thakur curated a food donation drive in collaboration with "All About Them", a foundation that helps stray and community animals. Thakur is a celebrity endorser for several brands and products, including Lakme and Dulux.

== Filmography ==
=== Films ===
Key
†	Denotes films that have not yet been released

Year	Title	Role	Language	Notes	Ref.
2014	Hello Nandan	Rubi	Marathi		
2014	Vitti Dandu	Sandhya	Marathi		
2014	Surajya	Dr. Swapna	Marathi		
2018	Love Sonia	Sonia Singhania	Hindi		
2019	Super 30	Supriya	Hindi		
2019	Batla House	Nandita	Hindi		
2020	Ghost Stories	Ira Kapoor	Hindi	Karan Johar's segment	
2021	Toofaan	Dr. Ananya Prabhu	Hindi		
2021	Dhamaka	Saumya Mehra	Hindi		
2022	Jersey	Vidya Rao	Hindi		
2022	Sita Ramam	Sita Mahalakshmi / Noor Jahan (Note: Thakur played a single character with two names.)	Telugu		
2022	Jahaan	Ghazal	Hindi	Short film	
2023	Selfiee	Unnamed	Hindi	Cameo appearance in the song "Kudiyee Ni Teri"	
2023	Gumraah	Shivani Mathur	Hindi		
2023	Lust Stories 2	Veda Kaushal	Hindi	R. Balki's segment	
2023	Aankh Micholi	Paro Singh	Hindi		
2023	Pippa	Radha Mehta	Hindi		
2023	Hi Nanna	Yashna / Varsha	Telugu		
2024	The Family Star	Indu Dhanraj	Telugu		
2024	Kalki 2898 AD	Divya	Telugu	Cameo appearance	
2025	Son of Sardaar 2	Rabia Akhtar	Hindi		
2026	Do Deewane Seher Mein	Roshni	Hindi		
2026	Dacoit: A Love Story	Saraswati alias "Juliet"	Telugu; Hindi	Bilingual film	
2026	Hai Jawani Toh Ishq Hona Hai	Baani	Hindi		
2026	Pooja Meri Jaan	Pooja	Hindi		
2027	Raaka †	TBA	Telugu	Filming	

=== Television ===
Year	Title	Role	Notes	Ref.
2012–2013	Mujhse Kuchh Kehti...Yeh Khamoshiyaan	Gauri Bhonsle		
2013	Arjun	Sakshi Anand		
2014–2016	Kumkum Bhagya	Bulbul Arora Khanna		
2014	Box Cricket League 1	Contestant	Team: Mumbai Warriors	
2015	Nach Baliye 7	Contestant	8th place	
2016	Saubhagyalaxmi	Herself	Guest appearance	
2016	Tuyul & Mbak Yul Reborn	Herself	Indonesian TV show; Guest appearance	
2017	Nadin	Tara	Indonesian TV show; Special appearance	
2023	Made in Heaven 2	Adhira Arya	Episode: "Beauty and the Beast"	

=== Music videos ===
Mrunal Thakur music video credits
Year	Title	Singer(s)	Ref.
2020	"Gallan Goriya"	Dhvani Bhanushali, Taz	
2021	"Bad Boy x Bad Girl"	Nikhita Gandhi, Badshah	
2021	"Aise Na Chhoro"	Guru Randhawa	

== Awards and nominations ==
Awards and nominations received by Mrunal Thakur
Year	Award	Category	Work	Result	Ref.
2015	Indian Television Academy Awards	Best Actress in a Supporting Role	Kumkum Bhagya	Won	
2015	Gold Awards	Best Actress in a Supporting Role	Kumkum Bhagya	Nominated	
2016	Gold Awards	Best Actress in a Supporting Role	Kumkum Bhagya	Nominated	
2017	Bollywood awards	Emosi Meluap-luap	Nadin	Won	
2018	London Indian Film Festival	Best Newcomer Award	Love Sonia	Won	
2019	Gold Awards	Rising Star From Indian Television to Films	—N/a	Won	
2020	Screen Awards	Most Promising Newcomer – Female	Super 30	Nominated	
2021	Lokmat Stylish Awards	Most Stylish Rising Star (Female)	—N/a	Won	
2022	Lokmat Stylish Awards	Most Stylish Game Changer	—N/a	Won	
2023	Indian Film Festival of Melbourne	Diversity in Cinema Award	—N/a	Won	
2023	South Indian International Movie Awards	Best Actress – Telugu	Sita Ramam	Nominated	
2023	South Indian International Movie Awards	Best Actress Critics – Telugu	Sita Ramam	Won	
2023	South Indian International Movie Awards	Best Female Debut – Telugu	Sita Ramam	Won	
2023	Filmfare Awards South	Best Actress – Telugu	Sita Ramam	Won	
2023	Filmfare OTT Awards	Best Actress in a Short Film	Jahaan	Won	
2024	Pinkvilla Screen and Style Icons Awards	Most Stylish Trendsetter of The Year	—N/a	Won	
2024	Filmfare Awards South	Best Actress – Telugu	Hi Nanna	Nominated	
2024	South Indian International Movie Awards	Best Actress – Telugu	Hi Nanna	Nominated	
2024	South Indian International Movie Awards	Best Actress Critics – Telugu	Hi Nanna	Won	
2024	IIFA Utsavam	Best Actress – Telugu	Hi Nanna	Won	
2024	Filmfare OTT Awards	Best Actor in a Web Original Film (Female)	Pippa	Nominated	
