= Shaktiman (2024 film) =

- Theatrical release poster
- Directed by: Prakash Kunte
- Written by: Pranav Apte (Dialogue)
- Screenplay by: Prakash Kunte
- Story by: Prakash Kunte
- Produced by: Prakash Kunte
- Starring: Adinath Kothare; Spruha Joshi; Priyadarshan Jadhav; Ishan Kunte
- Cinematography: Gaurav Ponkshe
- Edited by: Mayur Hardas
- Music by: Aditya Bedekar
- Production company: Motionscape Entertainment Production
- Distributed by: Filmastra Studios
- Release date: 24 May 2024 (Maharashtra)
- Country: India
- Language: Marathi

Shaktiman (subtitled onscreen Baba, Tu Hou Shaktos Superhero transl. Father, you can be a superhero) is a 2024 Indian Marathi-language family film written, directed and produced by Prakash Kunte, from a dialogues by Pranav Apte The film stars Adinath Kothare, Spruha Joshi, Priyadarshan Jadhav, Ishan Kunte in the lead roles.

== Cast ==
- Adinath Kothare as Siddharth
- Spruha Joshi as Seema
- Priyadarshan Jadhav as Tanaji
- Ishaan Kunte as Ishaan
- Vikram Gaikwad as Sandesh
- Mihir Nishith Rajda as Sumeet Shah
- Vaibhavi Anand as Lakshmi, Tanaji's wife
- Ramaa Nadgauda as Seema's mother
- Vidyadhar Joshi as Seema's father
- Kedar Damodar Soman as doctor
- Kannan Arunachalam as the company's managing director
- Madhuri Gawli Shinde as maid
- Shrikant Yadav as cab driver

== Release ==
=== Theatrical ===
The film was theatrically released on 24 May 2024 in Maharashtra.

=== Marketing ===
The first poster was revealed on 10 May 2024. The trailer was released on the birthday of Adinath Kothare.

== Reception ==
A reviewer from The Times of India rated 2.5 stars out of 5 stars and wrote "To cut the long story short, Shaktiman is a geniune film. It's [sic] heart in the right place, it's [sic] story is interesting. But the execution is not engaging."

=== Accolades ===
Year	Award	Category	Nominee (s)	Result	Ref.
2024	Maharashtra State Film Awards	Best Supporting Actor	Priyadarshan Jadhav	Nominated	
2024	Maharashtra State Film Awards	Best Dialogue	Prakash Kunte, Pranav Apte	Nominated	
2024	Aaryans Sanman	Best Film Critics	Shaktiman	Nominated	
2024	Aaryans Sanman	Best Actor	Adinath Kothare	Nominated	
2024	Aaryans Sanman	Best Singer Male	Adinath Kothare	Nominated	
2024	Aaryans Sanman	Best Child Actor	Ishaan Kunte	Nominated	
2024	Aaryans Sanman	Best Supporting Actor	Priyadarshan Jadhav	Won	
2024	Aaryans Sanman	Best Background Music	Aditya Bedekar	Won	
2024	Aaryans Sanman	Best Music	Aditya Bedekar	Nominated	
2024	Aaryans Sanman	Best Lyricist	Swapnil Chavan	Nominated	
2024	Aaryans Sanman	Best Cinematography	Gaurav Ponkshe	Won	
2024	Aaryans Sanman	Best Editor	Mayur Hardas	Nominated	
2024	Aaryans Sanman	Best Art Director	Akhilesh Suhas	Nominated	
