= Hello Nandan =

2014 Indian film

- Directed by: Rahul Jadhav
- Written by: Sourabh Bhave
- Produced by: Navin Ramnani; Reenu Ohlan
- Starring: Adinath Kothare; Mrunal Thakur; Neena Kulkarni
- Music by: Amitraj
- Release date: 14 March 2014
- Country: India
- Language: Marathi

Hello Nandan is an Indian Marathi language film directed by Rahul Jadhav and produced by Navin Ramnani and Reenu Ohlan. The film stars Adinath Kothare, Mrunal Thakur and Neena Kulkarni. The film was released on 14 March 2014.

== Synopsis ==
The movie revolves around Nandan Dikshit, who loses his mobile phone, which carries the number which can change the fortunes of his life. In his quest of finding the phone, he will discover his true self and against the corrupt and indifferent system.

== Cast ==
- Adinath Kothare as Nandan Dikshit
- Mrunal Thakur as Ruby
- Anant Jog
- Neena Kulkarni
- Devendra

== Soundtrack ==
Hello Nandan

Soundtrack album by Amitraj
- Released: 2014
- Recorded: 2014
- Genre: Feature film soundtrack
- Length: 15:01
- Language: Marathi

Official audio
- Hello Nandan – Full Album on YouTube

Track listing
No.	Title	Singer(s)	Length
1.	"Hello Nandan"	Aaman Trikha	2:22
2.	"Zule Zule"	Divya Kumar	3:05
3.	"Dhoon Ka Dhoon"	Neeti Mohan	4:20
4.	"Hans chala Kawa ki Chaal"	A.V. Prafullachandra	3:15
5.	"Bedhund Tu Bedhund Me"	Amitraj, Sayali Pankaj	2:39
Total length:			15:01

== Critical response ==
Hello Nandan received mixed reviews from critics. A reviewer from The Times of India gave the film a rating of 3/5 and wrote "The film is twisted and thrilling for its subject that everyone can identify with and can be enjoyed by those looking for a light thriller without putting much pressure on their brains". Jaydeep Pathakji of Maharashtra Times rated the film 2 out of 5 stars and wrote: "The events shown in the film do not approach the original content for the purpose of showing 'happening' in the film. They show something wrong. In fact, the original character in the film does not get an answer as to why he behaves so strangely. There is no problem to experience the movie as a time pass". A reviewer from Loksatta wrote "For those who have ever had their mobile phone stolen in their life, this film is a must watch and for those who haven't, this film is a must watch for a thrilling and equally fun experience, the same fun experience For this the film is worth watching".
