= Revati Lele =

Indian actress

- Born: Jalgaon, Maharashtra
- Occupations: Actress, dancer
- Years active: 2018–present
- Spouse: Kaushik Bhide (m. 2026)
- Partner(s): Adish Vaidya (2018–2023)

Revati Lele is an Indian television actress and a Kathak dancer. She started her acting career with episodic Gulmohar on Zee Yuva. Later, she worked in Indian television drama Vithu Mauli, Vartul and Lalit 205 etc. From 2022 to 2024, she is played a role in Star Pravah's Lagnachi Bedi as Madhurani. Currently she is playing a role in Star Pravah's Kon Hotis Tu, Kay Zalis Tu! as Amruta Dharmadhikari.

== Personal life ==
Lele was in the relationship with Adish Vaidya but they broke up in 2023 after dating 6 years. She engaged with another guy in December 2025.

== Career ==
In 2020, she essayed the role of Ramabai Peshwa in the television serial Swamini on Colors Marathi. In 2021, she stepped into Hindi television industry with the show Aapki Nazron Ne Samjha on StarPlus in which she played the character Bansuri. She also acted in Marathi serial Lagnachi Bedi on Star Pravah channel.

Revati Lele is also a Kathak dancer and a performer. She has completed her Nritya Visharad under Tina Tambe. She has been a part of Broadway style musical Mughal-e-Azam directed by Feroz Abbas Khan.

== Television ==
Year	Show	Role	Channel	Ref(s)
2017	Zindagi Not Out	Ajinkya's girlfriend	Zee Yuva	
2018	Lalit 205	Sara	Star Pravah	
2018	Gulmohar	Ruchi	Zee Yuva	
2018	Vithu Mauli	Mandakini	Star Pravah	
2018	Vartul	Shweta	Zee Yuva	
2020	Swamini	Ramabai Peshwa	Colors Marathi	
2021	Aapki Nazron Ne Samjha	Bansuri Rawal Parekh	Star Plus	
2022–2024	Lagnachi Bedi	Madhurani Deshpande Adhikari	Star Pravah	
2025–2026	Kon Hotis Tu, Kay Zalis Tu!	Amruta Dharmadhikari	Star Pravah	
2026–present	Pathrakhin	Trupti Vaidya	Star Pravah	
