= Full 3 Dhamaal =

2008 Marathi film directed by Mahesh Kothare

- Theatrical release poster
- Directed by: Mahesh Kothare
- Written by: Mahesh Kothare; Abhiram Bhadkamkar
- Produced by: Adinath Kothare
- Starring: Makarand Anaspure; Priya Arun; Abhiram Bhadkamkar; Kishori Godbole; Prasad Oak; Suchitra Bandekar
- Cinematography: Suresh Deshmane
- Edited by: Bunty Saini
- Music by: Ashok Patki
- Production company: Kothare & Kothare Vision
- Release date: 11 April 2008
- Running time: 106 minutes
- Country: India
- Language: Marathi

Full 3 Dhamaal is a 2008 Indian Marathi language comedy film directed by Mahesh Kothare who co wrote with Abhiram Bhadkamkar. It was produced by Adinath Kothare, under the banner of Kothare & Kothare Vision. It stars Makarand Anaspure, Priya Arun, Abhiram Bhadkamkar, Kishori Godbole, Prasad Oak, Suchitra Bandekar and Dilip Prabhavalkar. The plot of the film follows three female classmates who meet one day and decide to go on a trip and enjoys their lives as before while their husbands are away.

== Plot ==
A film director (Mahesh Kothare) introduces three school friends, Prema Tofhkhane (Priya Arun), Kishori Kulkarni (Kishori Godbole), and Saudamini Pradhan (Suchitra Bandekar), who are now housewives, engaged with family customs, and frustrated with their monotonous lives. They meet at the market one day and decide to take a trip to Ratnagiri for the new year. The three tell their husband that they are going on a pilgrimage to Ashtavinayaka. Rahul (Prasad Oak) organises bus tickets for their journey, which he provides to the three elderly women in secret.

The three buddies drive by car to their location, and they decide not to think about their families on this trip. One of the three women suffers a heart attack in the bus. Meanwhile, their spouses plan a New Year's party at the Tofhkhanes' bungalow, where they have drinks and have fun. While going to watch an adult film on television, they see the news of Prema being admitted to the hospital. In a drunken state, Vijay (Makarand Anaspure) reaches the I.C.U to see his wife, but due to intoxication, he doesn't find out about the women. The hospital doesn't allow them to stay there because of their intoxication so for a night they stay at the same hotel where their wives are staying. The next day, Prema, Kishori and Saudamini adores the young fit guy, Adi, with no other intentions in the pool but the guy ask them for a drink by which they understands his intentions and throws him in the pool again. The men reach the hospital again in the morning, where they come to know that the women have lied to them. Here enters the Eastern European arms dealer, M.K Dandy (Dilip Prabhavalkar). At night there is a new year party where everyone comes to enjoy themselves, unknown to each other, and the wives and husbands come to know about the truth.

== Cast ==
- Priya Arun as Prema Tofhkhane (Kashi)
- Kishori Godbole as Kishori Kulkarni
- Suchitra Bandekar as Saudamini Pradhan
- Makarand Anaspure as Vijay Tofhkane
- Abhiram Bhadkamkar as Sunil Kulkarni
- Prasad Oak as Rahul Pradhan
- Dilip Prabhavalkar as M.K Dandy
- Niranjan Namjoshi as Adi
- Sunil Tawde as Robert, hotel manager
- Ajay Jadhav as Siddhu, waiter
- Ameya Hunaswadkar as Dandy's assistant
- Sandeep Juwatkar
- Siddharth Jadhav as bus conductor (special appearance)
- Prema Kiran as traveller (special appearance)
- Rasika Joshi as Rahul's mother (special appearance)
- Savita Malpekar as Vijay's mother (special appearance)
- Prema Sakhardande as Sunil's आत्या, aatya, 'paternal aunt' (special appearance)
- Amber Kothare as Kaka (special appearance)
- Kranti Redkar as dancer (special appearance)
- Mahesh Kothare as himself (special appearance)

== Production ==
The film was produced by Mahesh Kothare's son, actor-director Adinath Kothare, who was also an assistant director for the film. This film also marked actress Suchitra Bandekar's debut in Marathi films; previously, she has acted in many Marathi daily soaps.

== Soundtrack ==
The songs were composed by Ashok Patki and the lyrics were penned by Shrirang Godbole, while the background music was done by Sanjay Dhakan. The vocals were provided by Vaishali Samant, Madhuri Karmarkar, Bela Sulakhe and Shailaja Subramanium. Umesh Jadhav choreographed the songs.

Track listing
No.	Title	Singer(s)	Length
1.	"Full 3 Dhamaal (Title Song)"	Bela Sulakhe, Madhuri Karmarkar, Shaileja Subramaniam	2:55
2.	"Khaara Shengdana"	Bela Sulakhe, Madhuri Karmarkar, Shaileja Subramaniam	3:09
3.	"Tandoori Paaplet"	Vaishali Samant	3:53
Total length:			9:57
