= Khabardar (film) =

- Theatrical release poster
- Directed by: Mahesh Kothare
- Written by: Mahesh Kothare
- Screenplay by: Abhiram Bhadkamkar
- Story by: Mahesh Kothare
- Produced by: Mahesh Kothare; Ambar Kothare
- Starring: Bharat Jadhav; Sanjay Narvekar; Nirmiti Sawant; Vinay Apte; Madhura Velankar; Kishori Godbole
- Cinematography: Shyam Chavan
- Music by: Ashok Patki
- Production company: Jenma Films International
- Release date: 8 September 2005
- Country: India
- Language: Marathi
- Budget: ₹80 lakh
- Box office: ₹8−10 crore

Khabardaar (transl. Beware) is a 2005 Marathi-language comedy film produced and directed by Mahesh Kothare and starring Bharat Jadhav, Sanjay Narvekar and Nirmiti Sawant.

The film was inspired by the 1940 classic American film His Girl Friday starring Cary Grant and Rosalind Russell.

== Plot ==
Bharat (Bharat Jadhav), a reporter at Khabardar newspaper, constantly finds himself at odds with his boss, Gauri Shringarpure (Nirmiti Sawant), who is never satisfied with his work and always demands more. Despite the professional challenges, Bharat is entangled in a personal dilemma as he divides his time between his demanding job and his love for Priyanka (Madhura Velankar).

On the other side of the story, Maruti Kamble (Sanjay Narvekar), a simple and honest truck driver, leads a modest life with his wife Tulsi (Kishori Godbole), two daughters, and his mother. However, privacy becomes a rare commodity for Maruti and Tulsi due to the constant presence of his mother (Rasika Joshi).

One day Bharat and Maruti cross paths and develop a strong friendship. Frustrated with the relentless demands of his boss, Bharat reaches a breaking point and makes a life-changing decision – he quits his job to marry Priyanka, becoming an integral part of her family.

Meanwhile, Maruti, in the course of his routine as a truck driver, is called to pick up a passenger at a seemingly ordinary bungalow. To his astonishment, the passenger turns out to be none other than the notorious wanted criminal, Anna Chimbori (Vinay Apte). Maruti unwittingly becomes a witness to a shocking crime when he observes that the local minister, More (Makarand Anaspure), not only shelters Anna Chimbori but also orchestrates his murder with the assistance of Inspector Pisal (Sunil Tawde).

Caught in the web of corruption and crime, Maruti becomes a target as More and Pisal frame him for the murder, leading to an imminent encounter. Feeling helpless and desperate, Maruti realizes that his only chance of survival lies in reaching out to Bharat and revealing the truth.

However, the plot thickens as Bharat, now disconnected from his reporting job, faces the challenge of how he can assist Maruti in this dire situation. The story unfolds with a mix of suspense, friendship, and the complexities of navigating personal and professional life in the face of unexpected twists and turns.

== Cast ==
- Bharat Jadhav as Bharat Bhalerao, Star Reporter of Khabardar
- Sanjay Narvekar as Maruti Kamble, Truck Driver
- Kishori Godbole as Tulsi Kamble, Maruti's Wife
- Nirmiti Sawant as Miss Gauri Shringarpure, Chief Editor of Khabardar
- Madhura Velankar as Priyanka Garware, Bharat's Girlfriend and Fiancé
- Mugdha Shah as Priyanka's Mother, Owner of Garware Industries
- Rasika Joshi as Maruti's Mother
- Pandharinath Kamble as Paddy, Reporter and Secretary for Miss Gauri Shringarpure
- Vinay Apte as Anna Chimbori, Renowned Gangster and Terrorist
- Vijay Chavan as Home Minister
- Makarand Anaspure as Mr More, Foster Minister of Haripur
- Sunil Tawde as Chandraji Suryaji Pisal, Senior Inspector
- Seva More as Monica
- Ameya Hunaswadkar as Fellow Reporter

=== Cameo Appearance ===
- Mahesh Kothare as himself
- Resham Tipnis as Item number in the song "Payal Baje Cham Cham"

== Production ==
=== Development ===
Khabardar concept was conceived by Mahesh Kothare, who wanted to make a thriller and crime film. The film is produced under his banner Jenma Films International. The film was an adaptation of 1940's American film His Girl Friday.

=== Casting ===
Sanjay Narvekar and Bharat Jadhav were chosen to portray the roles of Maruti Kamble and Bharat Bhalerao, respectively. Initially, Laxmikant Berde was the selected for the role of the Chief Editor of the Khabardar newspaper. Unfortunately, due to Laxmikant's passing before the filming began, the role was reassigned to Nirmiti Sawant. Director Mahesh Kothare decided to change the character's gender, renaming the role Gauri Shringarpure. Kishori Godbole was later selected for Tulsi's character, inspired by her performance in the television series Adhuri Ek Kahani.

== Soundtrack ==
Music for this film is composed by Ashok Patki. Lyrics were written by Kishor Ranade and Guru Thakur.

No.	Title	Singer(s)	Length
1.	"Dhumshaan Angaat Aala"	Swapnil Bandodkar, Vaishali Samant	04:13
2.	"Payal Baje Cham Cham"	Vaishali Samant, Swapnil Bandodkar	04:40
3.	"Dil Ko Diya"	Swapnil Bandodkar, Vaishali Samant	04:36
Total length:			13:33
