= Ganpati Bappa Morya =

Marathi-language mythological TV series

- Genre: Mythology
- Starring: See below
- Country of origin: India
- Original language: Marathi
- No. of episodes: 539

Production
- Producers: Mahesh Kothare; Adinath Kothare
- Camera setup: Multi-camera
- Running time: 22 minutes
- Production company: Kothare Vision

Original release
- Network: Colors Marathi
- Release: 24 November 2015 – 13 August 2017

Ganpati Bappa Morya is an Indian Marathi-language mythological TV series which aired on Colors Marathi. The show was produced by Mahesh Kothare under the banner of Kothare Vision. The show starred Adish Vaidya and Swaraj Yeole as Lord Ganesha. The show premiered from 24 November 2015 and stopped on 13 August 2017 completing 539 episodes.

== Summary ==
The show portrays the transition of Vinayak to Ganesha. It focuses more on the mother-son relationship between Ganesha and Parvati.

== Cast ==
- Swaraj Yevale as Child Ganpati
  - Adish Vaidya replaced Swaraj as Ganpati
- Anlesh Desai / Abhijeet Shwetachandra as Mahadev
- Sayli Patil / Manwa Naik as Parvati
- Sai Kalyankar as Kalyani / Siddhi
- Rajesh Deshpande as Narada
- Pallavi Vichare as Kamdhenu Cow

== Reception ==
Week	Year	BARC Viewership		Ref.
Week	Year	TRP	Rank	Ref.
Week 22	2016	1.4	4	
Week 24	2016	1.6	4	
