= Abhiram Bhadkamkar =

Indian film actor, director and writer

- Occupations: Actor; director; writer
- Years active: 1991–present
- Website: abhirambhadkamkar.com

Abhiram Bhadkamkar is an Indian actor, director and writer. He mainly worked as a writer in different films, serials and plays. Some of his famous films, as a writer are abiram Balgandharva, Pachadlela, Aai, Khabardar, A Rainy Day, Paulwaat and many more. His famous Marathi plays, as a writer, are Dehbhan, Altun Paltun, Pahuna, Sukhanshi Bhandato Amhi, Ladi Najariya, Hasat Khelat, Jyacha Tyacha Prashna and many more. His plays are performed in Hindi, Kannada and Gujarati in addition to Marathi theatre. A film directed by him is Aamhi Asu Ladke, presented and well received in many international and national film festivals. His collection of stories and novels are published by publishers/ publications of repute. His acting in films has won accolades. He acted in different Marathi and Hindi films and TV serials.
Abhiram has written the story of upcoming Marathi comedy film Jalsa.

== Early life ==
Abhiram Bhadkamkar graduated in Commerce, obtained a diploma in journalism and communication, and graduated from National School of Drama specializing in acting. He is currently engaged in acting, direction and writing in both languages Hindi and Marathi in various forms such as films and plays.

== Acting career ==
Hasat Khelat, Pahuna, Jyacha Tyacha Prashna (Sawal apna apna), Ladi Najaria, Dehbhan and Sukhanshi Bhandto Aamhi are some of his major works, produced by reputed theatre groups and performed all over Maharashtra and Delhi in different languages including Hindi, Kannada and Gujarathi.

Pahuna, Dehbhan and Jyacha Tyacha Prashna are published by Continental Prakashan, a reputed publication in Marathi, and won literature award of Maharashtra Government in 1994, 1995 and 2005. Chudail is a collection of short stories, focusing on the soul and revealing the harsh reality of a most covetous tinsel town. It received an award by Maharashtra Sahitya Parishad, as best short story collection. It is published by Akshar Publication.

Asa Balgandharva... is a biographic novel that depicts the legendary actor singer Balgandharva in all his human attributes, published by Rajhans Prakashan, it received the H. N. Apte Best Novel award.

He has written the films Balgandharva, Aai, Pachadlela, Devki, Khabardar etc. and received Best Dialogue and Best Screenplay award for the film Devki, which also received Best Film award from government of Maharashtra.

Aamhi Asu Ladke is a film he has written and directed and it has won many awards. It was officially selected for New York Independent International Film Festival and screened in November 2006 in New York and in Harrisburg. And now, his latest hit is Balgandharva (Story, Screenplay and Dialogues).

He has acted in Pachadlela, Ramdeo Ala Re Baba, Devki and Full 3 Dhamaal.

== Writer ==
=== Plays ===
No.	Name	Language
1	Jyacha Tyacha Prashna	Marathi
2	Dehbhan	Marathi
3	Sukhanshi Bhandato Amhi	Marathi
4	Yacht Diwashi Yacht Veli	Marathi
5	Hasat Khelat	Marathi
6	Pahuna	Marathi
7	Ladi Najariya	Hindi
8	Altun Paltun	Marathi
9	Apalak Nidrahin	Hindi
10	Sthal Snehamandir	Marathi
11	Prempatra	Marathi
12	Comred Ka Coat	Hindi
13	Saval Apna Apna	Hindi

=== Movies ===
No.	Name	Language
1	Jalsa	Marathi
2	Balgandharva	Marathi
3	Pachadlela	Marathi
4	Aai	Marathi
5	Khabardar	Marathi
6	A Rainy Day	Marathi
7	Viti Dandu	Marathi
8	Devki	Marathi
9	Manya Sajjana	Marathi
10	Ghayaal	Marathi
11	Full 3 Dhamaal	Marathi
12	Navsache Por	Marathi
13	April Fool	Marathi
14	Ramdeo Ala Re Baba	Marathi
15	Durge Durgat Bhari	Marathi
16	Kamal Majhya Baykochi	Marathi
17	Chikat Navra	Marathi
18	Aamhi Asu Ladke	Marathi
19	Veergati	Marathi
20	Me Shivaji Park	Marathi
21	Raghuveer	Marathi

=== TV serials ===
No.	Name	Language
1	Kshitij	Hindi
2	Sayaa	Hindi
3	Teacher	Hindi
4	Raste	Hindi
5	Gopalji	Hindi
6	V3+	Hindi

=== Literature ===
No.	Book Name	Language
1	Asa Balgandharva	Marathi
2	Chudail	Marathi
3	At Any Cost	Marathi
4	Insha Allah	Marathi

=== One Act Plays ===
No.	Name	Language
1	Dhobipachhad	Marathi
2	Pach Shunyanchi Berij	Marathi
3	Jhad	Marathi
4	Yega Yega Sari	Marathi

== Director ==
=== Movies ===
No.	Movie Name	Language	Year
1	Aamhi Asu Ladke	Marathi	2005
2	Baba Lagin	Marathi	2012

=== Documentaries ===
No.	Name	Language	Note
1	Film City	Marathi	Documentary by MTDC to introduce Bollywood Tourism
2	Behind The Stage	Hindi	Documentary based on back stage artists of theatre
3	Rangasanwaad	Marathi	Documentary about Marathi Parallel Theatre produced by Bridge of Tales LLP

== Acting ==
=== Movies ===
No.	Name	Language
1	Pachadlela	Marathi
2	Devki	Marathi
3	Full 3 Dhamaal	Marathi
4	Zindagi Zindabad	Hindi
5	Paulwaat	Marathi
7	Relations	Hindi
8	Ramdeo Ala Re Baba	Marathi

=== Serials ===
No.	Name	Language	Directed By
1	Chanakya	Hindi	Chandraprakash Dvivedi
2	Kshitij	Hindi	Anand Rai
3	Sailaab	Hindi	Ravi Rai
4	Raste	Hindi	Alka Maitra
5	Damini	Marathi	Kanchan Adhikari
7	CID	Hindi	B. P. Singh
8	Ahat	Hindi	B. P. Singh

== Awards and nominations ==
- Chaitraban Puraskar by G. D. Madgulkar foundation – 2006
- P.B. Bhave Puraskar by Pu. Bha. Bhave Smruti Samiti - 2006
- Jaywant Dalvi Puraskar by PCMC Natrya Parishad - 2011
- Mama Varerkar Best writer Award
- Lions Club Award
- Kalnirnaya Award for Best Playwright
- Natyadarpan's Jaywant Dalvi Award
- Alfa Gourav Award
- Ma.Ta.Sanman
- Best Screenplay & Dialogues award from State Government for the film Devki
- Best Dialogues award from Alfa Marathi Channel for the film Devki
- Best Dialogues award from Maharashtra Times for the film Devki
- Best Screenplay & Dialogues award from Marathi Chitrapat Mahamandal for the film Devki
- Best Dialogues award from Maharashtra Kalaniketan for the film Devki
- Best Screen Play award from Government of Maharashtra for the film Khabardar
- Special Jury award from Pune International Film Festival 2006 for the film Aamhi Asu Ladke
- Best Film award from Zee Marathi for the film Aamhi Asu Ladke
- Best Screen Play award from Zee Marathi for the film Aamhi Asu Ladke
- Best Story award from Zee Marathi for the film Aamhi Asu Ladke
- Best Screen Play award in Pune International Film Festival for the film Balgandharva
- Sangeet Natak Academy Award The highest award for an artist by Central Govt.
