= Devki =

2001 film

- Theatrical release poster
- Directed by: Millind Ukey
- Starring: Alka Kubal; Sudhir Joshi; Girish Oak; Shilpa Tulaskar; Milind Gawali
- Music by: Lalit Sen; Sanjeev Kohli
- Release date: 10 December 2001
- Country: India
- Language: Marathi

Devki is a 2001 Indian Marathi-language film directed by Milind Ukey. Produced by Mayur Shah and Naushir Mistry. The film stars Alka Kubal, Shilpa Tulaskar, Sudhir Joshi, Milind Gawali, Girish Oak, Abhiram Bhadkamkar in lead roles. It was released on 10 December 2001.

== Cast ==
The cast includes Alka Athalye, Sudhir Joshi, Dr Girish Oak, Shilpa Tulaskar, Milind Gawali & others.
