= Sanjay Shejwal =

Indian film actor (born 1988)

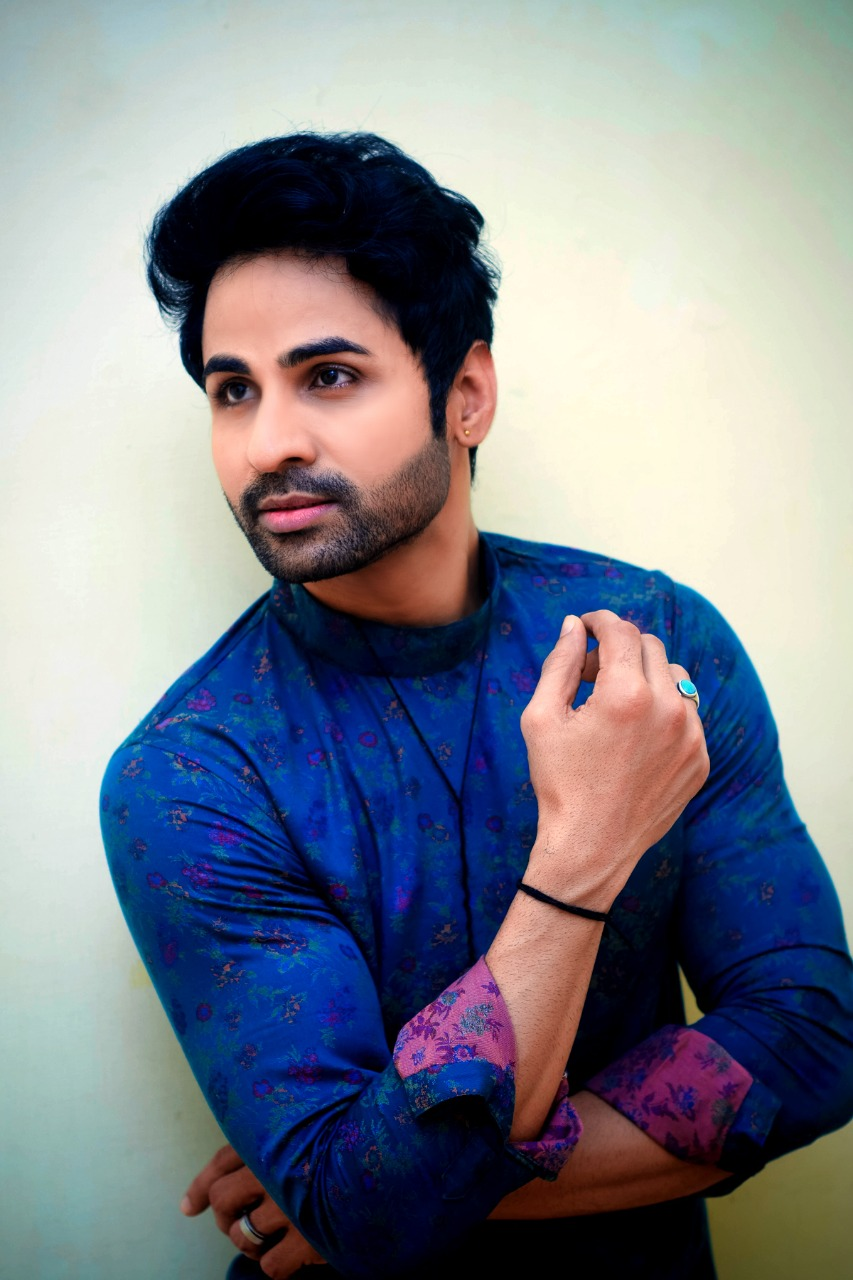
- Born: 19 September 1988 (age 37); Mumbai, Maharashtra, India
- Occupation: Actor
- Years active: 2008–present
- Awards: Ma.Ta.Sanman 2012, Maharashtra Govt Best Actor 2012

Sanjay Shejwal (born 19 September 1988) is an Indian actor best known for his work in Marathi cinema, Bollywood and Telugu cinema. Sanjay made his film debut with the film Saubhagya in 2012. Sanjay won the Ma.Ta.Sanman and Maharashtra Government best actor award in 2012 for the world record play Priya Bawari. He was also a runner-up in Nach Dhamaal celebrity dance reality show on Mi Marathi.

== Early life ==
Sanjay Shejwal was born to Shivram Shejwal and his wife Vasanti Shejwal. He started acting from his childhood in primary school in small skits (in Marathi called Natukalya). He actively participated in sports and other curriculum activities in school. At the school level, he was the captain of the kabaddi team. In school and college, he regularly took part in elocution competition. He also played from college team at university level volleyball. He is a brown belt holder in Martial arts. He is the only model of his college (PD lions college) who participated in all intercollegiate personality competition and won that competition. He also participated in intercollegiate ramp shows (fashion shows) and dance competitions. During his college days, he was CS (cultural secretary) of PD Lions college. He actively participated in college annual days in drama (theatre plays). He did his Master of Theatre Arts (MA in Natyashashastra) from University of Mumbai.Also called as Ramgabhimi Kala Adhisnatak.

== Career ==
Sanjay Shejwal started his Television Career with the TV serial Tu Tota Main Maina, which was directed by veteran film actor-director Sachin Pilgaonkar, which was telecast on DD National in the year 2006. Sanjay started his film career with the film Saubhagya Maza Daiwat in 2012.

== Filmography ==
=== Feature films ===
| Year | Film | Role | Language | Ref. |
|---|---|---|---|---|
| 2012 | Saubhagya Maza Daiwat | Prakash | Marathi | |
| 2014 | Prem Pahila Vahila | Rahul | Marathi | |
| 2014 | Laxmi Tuzyavina | Krish & Satish (double role) | Marathi | |
| 2017 | Tatwa | Likhit | Marathi | |
| 2019 | Chirner | Nagya Mahadu Katkari | Marathi | |
| 2020 | Ibhrat | Malhar | Marathi | |
| Under Production | Dome | Sonya | Marathi | |
| 2021 | Dil Dosti Duniyadari | Rahul | Marathi | |
| 2021 | D3: Dosti Dil Dhokha | Rahul | Telugu | |

=== Television ===
| Year | Serial | Channel | Language |
|---|---|---|---|
| 2006 | Tu Tota Main Maina | DD National | Hindi |
| 2008 | Kata Rute Kunala | ETV Marathi | Marathi |
| 2008 | Raja Shivchhatrapati | Star Pravah | Marathi |
| 2009 | Ek Phool Khilechhe Aag Ma | ETV Gujarati | Gujarati |
| | Sushila | DD Sahyadri | Marathi |
| | Ek Rikam Gharate | DD Sahyadri | Marathi |
| | Oon Sawali | DD Sahyadri | Marathi |
| 2009 | Vachan Dile Tu Mala | Star Pravah | Marathi |
| 2010 | Mangalsutra | ETV Marathi | Marathi |
| 2011 | Arundhati | Zee Marathi | Marathi |
| 2015 | Yek Number | Star Pravah | Marathi |
| 2024 | Lagnachi Bedi | Star Pravah | Marathi |
| 2024 | Premachi Gosht | Star Pravah | Marathi |
| 2025 | Kon Hotis Tu, Kay Zalis Tu! | Star Pravah | Marathi |

=== Theatre ===
Madhyam Vyayog directed by Waman Kendre
