= Avatarachi Goshta =

- Theatrical release poster
- अवताराची गोष्ट
- Directed by: Nitin Dixit
- Written by: Nitin Dixit
- Produced by: Sachin Salunkhe
- Starring: Adinath Kothare; Mihiresh Joshi; Yash Kulkarni
- Cinematography: Nagaraj Diwakar
- Edited by: Mayur Hardas
- Music by: Mangesh Dhakde
- Production company: Asian Entertainment
- Distributed by: Asian Entertainment
- Release date: 26 December 2014
- Running time: 118 minutes
- Country: India
- Language: Marathi
- Budget: ₹2.5 crore (US$260,000)

Avatarachi Goshta (Marathi:अवताराची गोष्ट) is a 2014 Marathi language drama film written and directed by Nitin Dixit and produced by Sachin Salunkhe under Asian Entertainment banner. The film marks the directorial debut of Nitin Dixit. The film stars Adinath Kothare, Mihiresh Joshi and Yash Kulkarni in lead roles and Leena Bhagwat, Rashmi Anpat, Sulabha Deshpande, Sunil Abhyankar in supporting roles. Ashish Vidyarthi appears in a special appearance. The film released on 26 December 2014 received positive reviews and won numerous awards from its inception.

== Plot ==
Kaustubh (Mihiresh Joshi) is an innocent little boy. He loves to live in his imaginative world that is full of wonders and adventures. The tales that his grandma Aaji (Sulabha Deshpande) tells him are the base on which he has built a few fantasies. The Dashavtar tales from Indian mythology are his favourite. These tales are based on Lord Vishnu's ten avatars. Kaustubh has also learnt through these tales that Lord Vishnu's tenth avatar, the Kalki avatar, is going to be incarnated in Kali Yuga, the modern era. The innocent mind of Kaustubh, who is in his fourth standard, is captured by the idea that he himself is that Kalki avatar. His close friend Mangya (Yash Kulkarni), who is equally thrilled with this idea, confirms his belief. A few incidental coincidences validate Kaustubh's imagination. Once he is convinced, he shares this secret with Amod (Adinath Kothare), the young engineering student who is a tenant in Kaustubh's home. Amod, who is an atheist by nature, does not pay much attention. Convinced by the idea of being the Kalki avatar, Kaustubh becomes so confident that he tries the biggest adventure he has been possessed with since quite a long time. He gets injured and suffers from a fractured leg. This acts as a big blow to Kaustubh's fantasy and his emotionally driven imaginative world is shattered. He finds it difficult to come to terms with reality and withdraws into a shell. He starts avoiding his dear friend Mangya and even everybody at his home. Observing his strange behaviour, the Doctor advises Kaustubh's parents to consult a psychiatrist. However, they do not act upon the advice, in anticipation of the social stigma. Kaustubh's mother (Leena Bhagwat) realizes that Kaustubh, who feels so detached from everyone, is comfortable with Amod. So she requests Amod to help Kaustubh come out of this emotional turmoil. Amod accepts this challenge and in an attempt to get into the crux of the problem, gets friendly with Mangya. He then understands that the real cause is Kaustubh's fantasy-based passion of becoming an avatar. Amod shares with Kaustubh a different perspective about the very concept of the avatar and slowly helps him come out of the mental stress he is facing. Kaustubh with Amod's help overcomes the depression and regains his confidence.

== Cast ==
- Adinath Kothare as Amod
- Mihiresh Joshi as Kaustubh
- Yash Kulkarni as Mangya
- Sulabha Deshpande as Kaustubh's Aaji
- Leena Bhagwat as Kaustubh's Mother
- Sunil Abhyankar as Kaustubh's Father
- Rashmi Anpat as Kaustubh's Sister
- Ashish Vidyarthi in special appearance

== Soundtrack ==
Avatarachi Goshta

Soundtrack album by Gandhaar Rohit Raut - Sridhar Menon
- Released: 18 December 2014
- Genre: Feature film soundtrack
- Length: 11:16
- Language: Marathi
- Label: Zee Music Company

The film's soundtrack is composed by Gandhaar, Rohit Raut - Sridhar Menon and lyrics are penned by Sunil Sukathankar. The film comprises only 3 track released on youtube18 December 2014

=== Track listing ===
Avatarachi Goshta
No.	Title	Singer(s)	Length
1.	"Namo Namah"	Shaan	4:05
2.	"Akram Tikram"	Jasraj Joshi	3:51
3.	"Dokyacha Zhalay Bhaza"	Rohit Raut, Siddh Lokare, Sharayu Date	3:41
Total length:			11:16

== Accolades ==
Year	Ceremony	Category	Result	Ref.
2014	51st Maharashtra State Film Award	Maharashtra State Film Award for Best Film	Won	
2014	51st Maharashtra State Film Award	Maharashtra State Film Award for Best Director	Won	
2014	51st Maharashtra State Film Award	Best Dialogue	Won	

== Release ==
The film released in overall Maharashtra on 26 December 2014.
