= Kothare Vision =

Indian film and television production company

- Trade name: Kothare Vision Pvt. Ltd.
- Type: Privately held company
- Industry: Entertainment
- Founded: 2008
- Founder: Mahesh Kothare
- Fate: Active
- Headquarters: Mumbai, India
- Key people: Mahesh Kothare (Chairman, managing director); Dinesh Koyande (CEO)
- Products: Film; Television
- Total assets: ₹25 lack (2017)
- Owner: Mahesh Kothare; Adinath Kothare
- Website: kotharevision.com

Kothare Vision Private Limited (KVPL) d.b.a Kothare Vision is an Indian film and television production company based in Mumbai. In the Marathi entertainment industry, Kothare Vision has become one of the most prolific production houses. Kothare Vision has gained recognition for its mythological series, particularly for hit series such as Jai Malhar and Vithu Mauli.

== Films produced ==
Year	Film	Language	Notes	Ref(s)
2008	Full 3 Dhamaal	Marathi		
2013	Zapatlela 2	Marathi		
2018	Perspective	Marathi	short film	
2024	Paani	Marathi		

== Television shows ==
Year	Title	Channel	Ref.
2009–2011	Man Udhan Varyache	Star Pravah	
2011	Anolkhi Disha	Star Pravah	
2014–2017	Jai Malhar	Zee Marathi	
2015–2017	Ganpati Bappa Morya	Colors Marathi	
2017–2020	Vithu Mauli	Star Pravah	
2019	Ek Hoti Rajkanya	Sony Marathi	
2019–2020	Prem Poison Panga	Zee Yuva	
2020–2024	Sukh Mhanje Nakki Kay Asta!	Star Pravah	
2020–2021	Dakkhancha Raja Jotiba	Star Pravah	
2021	Pahile Na Mi Tula	Zee Marathi	
2022–2024	Pinkicha Vijay Aso!	Star Pravah	
2022–2024	Majhi Manasa	Sun Marathi	
2024–present	Savlyachi Janu Savali	Zee Marathi	
2024–2025	Ude Ga Ambe	Star Pravah	
2025–2026	Nashibvan	Star Pravah	
2026–present	Dhaktya Sunbai	Zee Marathi	

== Other ventures ==
=== Storyteller's Nook Pvt. Ltd. ===
In 2023, Kothare Vision launched Storyteller's Nook Pvt. Ltd., a creative arm focused on developing new writers and filmmakers and bringing lesser-told stories to screen. The company produced the Marathi crime thriller web series Manvat Murders (2024) for SonyLIV, and Detective Dhananjay: Rahasyajaal (2026) for ZEE5.
