= Nayyi Navelli =

2026 Indian film by Balaji Mohan

- Theatrical release poster
- Directed by: Balaji Mohan
- Screenplay by: Divy Nidhi Sharma
- Story by: Himanshu Sharma
- Produced by: Aanand L. Rai; Himanshu Sharma
- Starring: Yami Gautam; Adinath Kothare
- Cinematography: Rishi Punjabi
- Edited by: Sumeet Kotian
- Music by: G. V. Prakash Kumar
- Production companies: Amazon MGM Studios; Colour Yellow Productions
- Distributed by: PVR Inox Pictures
- Release date: 16 October 2026
- Running time: 138 minutes
- Country: India
- Language: Hindi
- Budget: ₹35 crore
- Box office: ₹31.00 crore

Nayyi Navelli is a 2026 Indian Hindi-language comedy horror film written by Himanshu Sharma and Divy Nidhi Sharma and directed by Balaji Mohan under the banner of Amazon MGM Studios and Colour Yellow Productions. It stars Yami Gautam in lead role. The film marks Kollywood filmmaker Balaji Mohan's directorial debut in Bollywood. Nayyi Navelli was released in theatres on 16 October 2026.

== Plot ==
The film starts with the Marriage of Pinky Bua in Meerut, Uttar pradesh, while Raja and his family searches for Mohini. Bantu, Raja's brother and his friend records Mohini doing a pooja and abduct her with the help of priest. They lock her in a room with sacred knots, while the wedding proceeds. Family sends off Pinky Bua. Bantu gathers the family together the next morning and tells them Bhabhi (Mohini) is a Dayan (witch), to which the family scolds and beats him.

Bantu asks Raja about their first meeting. Raja describes meeting Mohini in a party and his boss dies in chandelier accident after seeing Mohini. He also explains them about traveling with Mohini that night and sweet moments they shared. Bantu finds suspicious things about Mohini's behavior during that time. He also explains how his friend lost his tongue after seeing Mohini.

Meanwhile the family explains the good things happened in the family after Mohini's arrival including Pinky's marriage. Bantu then shares a event that happened on enagagement at Mohini's house where she tried to push a old lady off a balcony. And he narrates few incidents during and after marriage. This creates suspicion on everyone's mind but Raja refuses to believe it. A photographer comes to their house and frees Mohini from the closed room.

She comes and the whole family starts to fear, Bantu throws Sindoor on her which was brought from Holy shiva temple, drifting her off from balcony railing. She reveals her true self and family gets scared and asks her if she is a Dayan. She chants mantra and proves she is not and hints there is a Rakshas among them. To everyone's shock Raja turns into Ravana and starts attacking the whole family and Mohini. She manages to control him and bring him into human form.

When the family asks about who is she and why their son turned into Ravana. She explains about Kaalsheel, a super-powered gem which belonged to Mayasura in Tretayug, Ravana's father-in-law. She explained how Ravana got the Kaalsheel by defeating Mayasura and married Mandodhari. Mohini states that after death of Ravana, it was given to Mandodhari and asked her and her generations to protect it and all women from creepy, womanizer men. Mohini belongs to that generation.Mohini tells that the kaalasheel was captured by Duryodhana in Dwaparyug and went missing. She then explains the house the family living belongs to Ravana's in-law place and Raja's horroscope matches with Ravana's horroscope.

She says she wantedly met Raja and entered into the family to find kaalasheel,but she actually fell in love with him as he is a gentle man. But to her shock the kaalasheel was stolen from the house. Mohini states that within dusshera the power of kaalasheel will increase and she will have to fight Ravana. Raja wakes up remebering nothing and thinks his family hurt his wife. Meanwhile family decides to leave the home to save their lives and property but returns after watching Ram-leela while travelling.

A monster power captures a Band and turns them into zombies as Bhaaratis (relatives) of Ravana, which can only seen by Mohini and family. While family prepares to fight Ravana, they find out that one of their relatives is a ghost and she is Maricha's wife came to get revenge for her husband's death and she is the one who stole kaalasheel. Ravana obtains Kaalasheel and starts attacking and destroying his surroundings.

Mohini Fights with him and Kills Ravana with the presence of Shri Ram. Ravana gets killed and leaves Raja's body and the family reunites.

In the post-credits scene, kaalasheel was obtained by Mohini again.

== Cast ==
- Yami Gautam as Mohini
- Adinath Kothare as Raja Awasthi
- Mita Vashisht as Pinky Bua
- Sonal Jha as Sumitra Tai
- Sunita Rajwar as Asha Devi
- Rajesh Dubeay as Tau Ji
- Aaditya Kulshreshth as IAS Vishal
- Prateek Pachauri as Punnu Chacha
- Sushmita Mukherjee as Dadi
- Jacqueline Fernandez as Cameo appearance

== Production ==
Initially Kriti Sanon was reported to be the female lead. Later in October 2025, it was confirmed that Sanon was not part of the cast due to her busy schedule of Tere Ishk Mein and Cocktail 2. In January 2026 Yami Gautam was finalised for the lead role. Gautam started filming on 7 April 2026.

== Music ==
Nayyi Navelli

Soundtrack album by G. V. Prakash Kumar
- Released: 19 October 2026
- Recorded: 2025—2026
- Studios: Purple Haze Studios, Harr Studio, Contrail Studio, The Sanctuary Audio Visual Studio, Divine Labs
- Genre: Feature film soundtrack
- Length: 15:57
- Label: Zee Music Company
- Producer: G. V. Prakash Kumar

G. V. Prakash Kumar chronology
| Mandaadi (2026) | Nayyi Navelli (2026) |
External audio
- Nayyi Navelli-Full Album on YouTube

G. V. Prakash Kumar composed the music for the film.And all lyrics written by Vayu.The first single title "Bhabhi Tabaahi" was released on 25 September 2026.Second single titled "Phata Patakha" was released on 6 October 2026.Third single titled "The World of Nayyi Navelli" ,which is instrumental track, was released on 9 October 2026. Fourth single titled "Awadhiya Ke Raja" was on 14 October 2026.

Track listing
| No. | Title | Lyrics | Singers | Length |
|---|---|---|---|---|
| 1. | "The World of Nayyi Navelli" | - | - | 2:19 |
| 2. | "Bhabhi Tabaahi" | Vayu | Neeti Mohan | 4:02 |
| 3. | "Phata Patakha" | Vayu | Madhubanti Bagchi | 3:16 |
| 4. | "Awadhiya Ke Raja" | Vayu | Shreya Ghoshal | 4:09 |
| 5. | "Rise of Ramabharam" | - | - | 2:11 |
| Total length: | | | | 15:57 |

== Release ==
The film was theatrical released on 16 October 2026.

== Reception ==
On the review aggregator website Rotten Tomatoes, 14% of 14 critics' reviews are positive, with an average rating of 4.1/10.

Shubhra Gupta of The Indian Express gave 1 star out of five and stated that "Gautam-starrer begins with so much potential, which is comprehensively squandered in scattered writing-and-execution, to the point the film become an exercise in patience." Saibal Chatterjee of NDTV gave 2 stars out of 5 and said that "The result is a film that neither looks pretty nor sounds right. Talk overshadows action and logic gets drowned out in the confusing din of clashing decibel levels." Shreyas Pande of The Hindu writes that "The film loses shape of its identity as it descends into mythology, acting often like an overdramatic TV soap." Sukanya Verma of Rediff.com rated it 2.5 stars out of 5 and said that "Nayyi Navelli is a chaotic and forgettable cinematic experience, struggling to blend mythological, horror, and social commentary into a cohesive narrative."

Rahul Desai of The Hollywood Reporter India writes in his review that "Nayyi Navelli takes is consumed by its own reverence and awe: like a homegrown Dan Brown novel in search of national validation. The film joins the recent spate of devotional mytho-dramas that insist on treating fiction as actual history." Nandini Ramnath of Scroll.in observed that "The initially promising film piggybacks on the Ramayana even as it hops onto the box office-friendly bandwagon of films that come with a disclaimer that they are not promoting occult beliefs and then proceed to do exactly that." Rishabh Suri of Hindustan Times gave 2.5 stars out of 5 and stated that "Gautam's film blends mythology and comedy but loses its way in an overstuffed, confusing screenplay." Bollywood Hungama gave 2 stars out of 5 and said that "Nayyi Navelli has an interesting premise and a fine performance by Yami Gautam Dhar. However, the weak writing, unconvincing developments and poor execution make the film a disappointing affair."
