= Kishori Godbole =

Indian actress

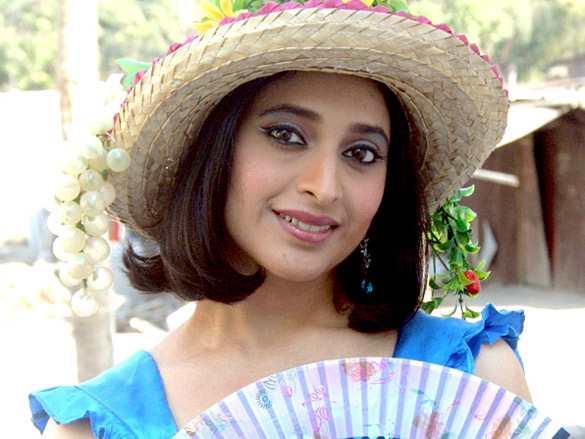
- Kishorii Godbole in 2011
- Born: Kishori Kulkarni; 15 December 1975 (age 50); Nashik, Maharashtra, India
- Occupation: Actress
- Years active: 1998–present
- Spouse: Sachin Godbole
- Children: Sai Godbole
- Parent: Jaywant Kulkarni (father)
- Website: http://www.godbolestores.com/

Kishori Godbole is a Marathi TV and film actress. She is the daughter of Marathi singer Jaywant Kulkarni. She is known for her role as Mrs. Vibhavari Suhaas Tendulkar in Mrs Tendulkar. She is also a well known theater actress of many plays. She played the character of Shobha in Sachin Pilgaonkar's TV series Hudd Kar Di, aired on Zee TV. She also played role of Bayaza Maa in SET's show Mere Sai – Shraddha Aur Saburi.

== Television ==
| Year | Title | Role | Ref. |
|---|---|---|---|
| 1998–1999 | Rin Ek Do Teen | Various characters | |
| 1999 | Mano Ya Na Mano | Shivani (In the episode Parchhai) | |
| 1999–2000 | Hudd Kar Di | Shobha | |
| 2004–2008 | Adhuri Ek Kahani | Amruta Patwardhan | |
| 2009 | Fu Bai Fu | Herself | |
| 2011 | Mrs. Tendulkar | Mrs. Vibhavari Tendulkar | |
| 2013–2014 | Madhuri Middle Class | Maya Amitabh Raje | |
| 2016 | Khidki | Appearance in "Guru Daxina" Story | |
| 2019–2023 | Mere Sai – Shraddha Aur Saburi | Bayaza Maa | |

== Filmography ==
| Year | Film | Role | Language |
|---|---|---|---|
| 1999 | Kohram | Bharti | Hindi |
| 2002 | Ek Aur Visphot | Kiran Joshi | Hindi |
| 2005 | Khabardar | Tulsi Kamble | Marathi |
| 2006 | Majha Navra Tujhi Bayko | Naina Desai/ Rukmani | Marathi |
| 2007 | Baba Lagin | Kishi | Marathi |
| 2008 | Full 3 Dhamaal | Kishori Kulkarni | Marathi |
| 2011 | One Room Kitchen | Neha | Marathi |
| 2022 | Hawahawai | Swati | Marathi |
