= Pachhadlela =

- Theatrical release poster
- Directed by: Mahesh Kothare
- Written by: Story: Abhiram Bhadkamkar; Mahesh Kothare; Dialogue: Abhiram Bhadkamkar
- Produced by: Mahesh Kothare
- Starring: Bharat Jadhav; Shreyas Talpade; Laxmikant Berde; Vandana Gupte; Dilip Prabhawalkar
- Edited by: Sanjay Dabke
- Music by: Anil Mohile
- Production company: Jenma Films International
- Release date: 9 April 2004
- Running time: 135 minutes
- Country: India
- Language: Marathi

Pachhadlela (transl. The Possessed One) is a 2004 Indian Marathi-language comedy horror film directed and produced by Mahesh Kothare under Jenna Films International, the film stars Bharat Jadhav, Shreyas Talpade, Laxmikant Berde, Vandana Gupte, Dilip Prabhawalkar.

The music is composed by Anil Mohile and VFX by Binoy Samuel. The film was the highest-grossing film in regional languages. The film was the first Marathi film in which computer generated effects were used. Most of the film was shot at Bavdekar Bungalow in Gaganbawada.

The film was the last performance of actor Laxmikant Berde, who died in December 2004 due to kidney ailment.

== Plot ==
Bharat (Bharat Jadhav), Ravi (Shreyas Talpade) and Sameer (Abhiram Bhadkamkar) are transferred to village branch of their bank and are granted an old wada (palace) as a living quarters. They immediately start experiencing paranormal activities which mainly affect Bharat. Initially, Ravi and Sameer deny to believe Bharat when he tells them about the Wada being haunted. Kirkire (Vijay Chavan) possesses Bharat on Ravi's engagement day and reveals certain ritualistic problems which cause Ravi's engagement ceremony to be a total disaster. Bharat is admitted to a mental asylum. Soon Bharat and his friends learn about the story behind the spirits at the Wada from Inspector Mahesh Jadhav (Mahesh Kothare). In the past Inamdar Bhusnale (Dilip Prabhavalkar) was a rich, arrogant and deceptive owner of the Wada. His son Babya (Amey Hunaswadkar) was mentally unstable and had a maniacal obsession for marriage. As per a suggestion from a renowned priest, Bhusnale fixes Babya's wedding with a girl from outside the village so that she won't be aware of Babya's real illness. As per the priest's prediction, as soon as Babya would get married he will be miraculously cured. But, Durga Maushi (Vandana Gupte) who is Bhusnale's neighbor and an outspoken critique of his family learns about this plan and disrupts the wedding ritual. The girl and her family learn about the truth and call off the marriage. This causes immense loss of reputation to Bhusnale. Also due to the shock caused by the situation Babya breaks down mentally and is admitted to a mental asylum where he commits suicide. Bhusnale vows to take revenge and dies due to a heart attack. Ever since that day Babya, his father Bhusnale and their custodian Kirkire haunt the palace seeking a medium for avenging Durga Maushi's actions. Bharat, Sameer and Ravi work together along with their friends and Vetale Guruji (Laxmikant Berde ) to perform a ritual to destroy the evil spirits of Bhusnale, Babya and Kirkire. As per a book by Vetale's great-grandfather who was a master ghost hunter, Vetale places three dolls each accompanied by an object of interest of Bhusnale, Babya and Kirkire. Their spirits then enter the dolls and the dolls are burnt in the ritual fire. Durga Maushi's spirit gets peace after learning about this and departs.

== Cast ==
- Bharat Jadhav as Bharat
- Abhiram Bhadkamkar as Sameer
- Shreyas Talpade as Ravi Deshmukh
- Dilip Prabhawalkar as Inamdar Bhusnale, Father of Baban AKA Baabya
- Ameya Hunaswadkar as Baban Inamdar AKA Baabya, Son of Inamdar Bhusnale
- Vijay Chavan as Kirkire, Inamdar Bhusnale's Trusted Aide
- Vandana Gupte as Durga Maushi, Manisha's Mother
- Ashwini Kulkarni as Manisha, Durga Maushi's Daughter & Ravi's Love interest
- Laxmikant Berde as Vetale Guruji, Renowned Priest
- Neelam Shirke as Sunaina, Vetale Guruji's Sister & Sameer's Love interest
- Megha Ghadge as Soundarya Jawalkar, Folk Dance Artist & Bharat's Love interest
- Ravindra Berde as Dhondiba Jawalkar, Soundarya's Father
- Mahesh Kokate as Batashya, Pansy Character
- Neena Kulkarni as Ravi's Mother
- Pradip Kabare as Ravi's Father
- Mangal Kenkare as Manisha's Aunty
- Sajid Sheikh as Zunzarrao Hambirrao Sarnobat Patil Anjangavkar, Bank Manager
- Poornima Ahire as Miss Sawant, Zunzarrao's Secretary
- Vijay Gokhale as Psychiatrist, in Babanrao Psychiatric Hospital
- Mahesh Kothare as Inspector Mahesh Jadhav
- Amber Kothare as Guard in Railway station
- Dagdu Kamble as Beggar
- Balu Khot as Tangewala
- Kumar Ubale as Mental patient

== Soundtrack ==
The film's soundtrack was composed by Anil Mohile, with lyrics penned by Pravin Davane.

=== Track list ===
No.	Title	Singer(s)	Length
1.	"Mauj Masti"	Hrishikesh Ranade, Amey Date, Chetan Rana	05:39
2.	"Rupaan Dekhani"	Vaishali Samant, Hrishikesh Ranade	05:03
Total length:			10:42

== Release ==
The film was released all over Maharashtra on 9 April 2004, and was instant commercial success and was running for 50 weeks in theatres of Maharashtra

== Awards ==
Year	Award	Category	Nominee	Result	Ref.
2004	Maharashtra State Film Award	Best Comedy Actress	Vandana Gupte	Won	
