= 15 August (2019 film) =

2019 Marathi drama film

- Film poster
- Directed by: Swapnaneel Jaykar
- Produced by: Madhuri Dixit
- Starring: Mrinmayee Deshpande; Adinath Kothare
- Distributed by: Netflix
- Release date: 29 March 2019
- Running time: 124 minutes
- Country: India
- Language: Marathi

15 August is a 2019 Indian Marathi-language drama film directed by Swapnaneel Jaykar and produced by Madhuri Dixit. The film features Rahul Pethe, Mrinmayee Deshpande and Adinath Kothare in the lead roles.

The film was released on 29 March 2019 on Netflix.

== Plot ==
In Mumbai, a crazy accident sets in motion a love story between Raju and Jui on India's Independence Day. Also, the residents of the chawl where the action takes place unite to help a little boy in trouble.

== Cast ==
- Abhishek Deshmukh as Omkar
- Mrunmayee Deshpande
- Namrata Kadam as Ninada's Mother
- Adinath Kothare
- Rahul Pethe
- Vaibhav Mangle as Gokhle

== Release ==
The reception of Bucket List, in which Dixit appeared, prompted her to make a film in Marathi language. Instead of opening the movie in theaters, 15 August was shown to Netflix, who liked the idea. It was released on 29 March 2019.
