= Adhuri Ek Kahani =

2004 Indian Marathi language TV series

- Genre: Drama
- Written by: Rohini Ninawe
- Directed by: Vaibhav Shetkar
- Starring: See below
- Country of origin: India
- Original language: Marathi
- No. of episodes: 908

Production
- Production locations: Mumbai, Maharashtra
- Camera setup: Multi-camera
- Running time: 22 minutes
- Production company: Samvedna Entertainment

Original release
- Network: Zee Marathi
- Release: 18 October 2004 – 16 February 2008

Adhuri Ek Kahani (transl. Incomplete one story) is an Indian Marathi language TV series which aired on Zee Marathi. It starred Swapnil Joshi, Kishori Godbole and Neena Kulkarni in lead roles.

== Plot ==
Amruta and Arpita are two sisters. Amruta was lived in America for education purpose and Arpita was reporter in India. Things were changed when Amruta came to India with pregnant without marriage. Her parents didn't know about that but her sister Arpita knew everything.

Kedarnath Patwardhan was a singer & Kalyani Patwardhan was a notable businesswoman in Mumbai. Their son Yash Patwardhan fell in love with Arpita but she rejected him but Kalyani arranged his marriage with Amruta without knowing him. Amruta came to home after delivery. Yash decided to marry Amruta because due to that he can talk with Arpita and the story begins.

== Cast ==
=== Main ===
- Kishori Godbole as Amruta Vijay Deodhar / Amruta Yash Patwardhan
- Swapnil Joshi as Yash Kedarnath Patwardhan
- Neena Kulkarni as Kalyani Kedarnath Patwardhan

=== Recurring ===
- Nupur Prasanna / Priya Bapat / Sneha Wagh as Arpita Vijay Deodhar
- Smita Jaykar as Mrunal Patwardhan
- Shishir Sharma as Mrunal's husband
- Sandeep Mehta / Girish Oak as Kedarnath Patwardhan
- Rajan Tamhane as Vijay Deodhar
- Shubhangi Latkar as Veena Vijay Deodhar
- Sheetal Kshirsagar as Tejas Kedarnath Patwardhan
- Ashish Kulkarni as Tejas's boyfriend
- Amol Kolhe as Divakar
- Avishkar Darwhekar as Siddharth
- Pallavi Subhash as Neerja Shah
- Radhika Vidyasagar as Anuradha Sathe
- Pankaj Vishnu as Vikrant Sahebrao
- Mugdha Shah as Vikrant's mother
- Swati Chitnis as Anandita
- Poonam Gulati
- Rahul Mehendale
- Shweta Mehendale
- Omkar Karve
- Vikas Patil

== Awards ==
Zee Marathi Utsav Natyancha Awards
Year	Category	Recipient	Role	Ref.
2005	Best Negative Character Female	Neena Kulkarni	Kalyani Patwardhan	
2006	Best Negative Character Female	Neena Kulkarni	Kalyani Patwardhan	
