= Ashok Saraf filmography =

Films by Ashok Saraf

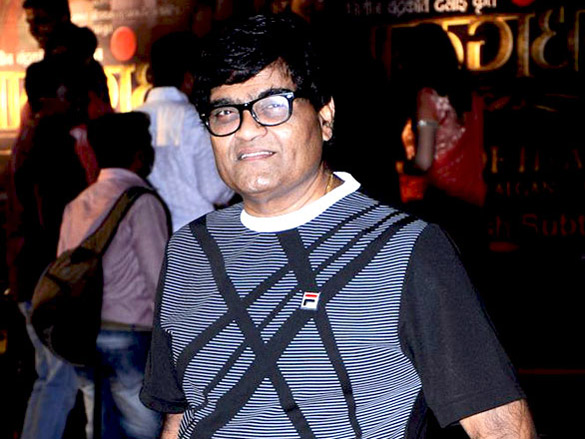
Saraf in 2019

Ashok Saraf (born 4 June 1947) is an actor mainly working in Marathi and Hindi cinema. He is known as the "King of Marathi Film Industry".

Saraf began his career in 1969 with the Marathi film Janaki. He went on to act in numerous films throughout the 1970s and 1980s, including Donhi Gharcha Pahuna, Jawal Ye Laju Nako, Tumcha Aamcha Jamala, Chimanrao Gundyabhau, Deed Shahane, Haldikunku, Duniya Kari Salam, and many more. But he gained popularity through Dada Kondke's 1975 film Pandu Havaldar. He continued to work in Marathi films alongside Laxmikant Berde, Sachin, and Mahesh Kothare.

During that time, Marathi films entered a new era of comedy. Saraf starred in several notable Marathi films of this period, including Ashi Hi Banwa Banwi, Aayatya Gharat Gharoba, Balache Baap Brahmachari, Bhutacha Bhau, and Dhum Dhadaka. Ashi Hi Banwa Banwi remains a popular film to this day, and its freshness and humor continue to entertain audiences. It broke numerous records at the time of its release. The duo of Saraf and Berde became one of the most successful comedy pairs of that time, and they also worked in several Hindi films together.

Saraf has also acted in various Marathi plays and Hindi television serials. He later started his own production house, "Aniket Telefilms," which is managed by his wife Nivedita Saraf.

Saraf has starred in numerous Marathi films. He has also graced Hindi films and television shows with his presence. His talent has been recognized with numerous awards, including five Filmfare Awards and ten Maharashtra State Film Awards. He is the recipient of V. Shantaram Award and Maharashtra Bhushan Award.

== Films ==
Key
†	Denotes films that have not yet been released

Year	Title	Role	Language	Notes
1969	Janaki	Madan	Marathi	
1971	Donhi Gharcha Pahuna	Sanitary Inspector	Marathi	Small role
1973	Aalay Tufan Darayala	Ashkya	Marathi	
1975	Pandoba Porgi Phasali	Dhondu	Marathi	
1975	Varat	Sopan's brother	Marathi	
1975	Pandu Havaldar	Hawaldar Sakharam	Marathi	Maharashtra State Film Award for Best Supporting Actor
1976	Tumcha Aamcha Jamala	Nagojirao (Nagya)	Marathi	
1976	Jawal Yeh Laju Nako	Gaja	Marathi	
1977	Navra Majha Brahmachari	Jaisingh	Marathi	
1977	Dagaa	Master	Marathi	
1977	Ram Ram Gangaram	Mhamdu Khatik	Marathi	Filmfare Award for Special Mention
1978	Sushila	Mangdu Bhaiya (Raja)	Marathi	
1978	Damaad	Mr. Khote	Hindi	
1979	Meri Biwi Ki Shaadi	Adv. Venkat Vyas	Hindi	
1979	Duniya Kari Salaam	Shivanand	Marathi	
1979	Gyanabachi Mekh	Gyanaba	Marathi	
1979	Ashtavinayak	Himself	Marathi	
1979	Sasurvasheen	Popat Sawant	Marathi	
1979	Deedshahane	Raja Jagdale	Marathi	
1979	Baeelveda	Avinash	Marathi	Maharashtra State Film Award for Best Actor
1979	Haldi Kunku	Unnamed	Marathi	Cameo appearance
1979	Chimanrao Gundyabhau	Chimanrao	Marathi	
1979	Paijecha Vida	Tukaram	Marathi	
1980	Sharan Tula Bhagwanta	Adinath	Marathi	
1980	Saubhagyadaan	Sulaiman	Marathi	
1980	Sawaj	Kuldeep	Marathi	
1980	Hich Khari Daulat	Prasad	Marathi	
1980	Sulavarchi Poli	Rahim Road master	Marathi	
1980	Fatakadi	Bawlya	Marathi	
1980	Choravar Mor	Pratap Vanpurekar	Marathi	
1981	Nagin	Tegya	Marathi	
1981	Mosambi Narangi	Popatrao	Marathi	
1981	Govinda Aala Re Aala	Sarjerao	Marathi	
1981	Are Sansar Sansar	Savkar Patil	Marathi	
1981	Sundara Satarkar	Bhunjang Rao	Marathi	
1981	Gondhalat Gondhal	Madan Kumar	Marathi	Maharashtra State Film Award for Best Supporting Actor
1981	Daivat	Ashok	Marathi	
1981	Bhannat Bhanu	Hanumantrao	Marathi	
1981	Patlin	Chhagan	Marathi	
1981	Devghar	Raja	Marathi	Short film
1982	Aapalech Daat Aapalech Oath	Sajjanrao	Marathi	
1982	Ek Daav Bhutacha	Khandoji Farzand	Marathi	Maharashtra State Film Award for Best Supporting Actor
1982	Savitrichi Sun	Raja	Marathi	
1982	Mai Baap	Gunwanti / Sethji Shyamji Ghanashyamji	Marathi	
1982	Don Baika Phajeeti Aika	Jaisinghrao Pawar	Marathi	
1982	Galli Te Dilli	Rahuba	Marathi	
1982	Kashala Udyachi Baat	Vidhyadhar (Bima Babu)	Marathi	
1983	Raghu Maina	Dafliwala	Marathi	
1983	Gupchup Gupchup	Professor Dhond	Marathi	
1983	Baiko Asavi Ashi	Kalu	Marathi	
1983	Savitri	Madya (Bajirao)	Marathi	
1983	Thakas Mahathak	Balasaheb Inamdar	Marathi	
1983	Savvasher	Ashok Rao	Marathi	
1984	Jugalbandi		Marathi	
1984	Zakhmi Waghin	Sarja	Marathi	
1984	Kulswamini Ambabai	Vasantrao	Marathi	
1984	Chawhata	Ganpat	Marathi	
1984	Bahurupi	Sawalya (Bhau Kaka)	Marathi	Maharashtra State Film Award for Best Actor
1984	Gulchadi	Gaja	Marathi	
1984	Navri Mile Navryala	Balasaheb Inamdar	Marathi	
1984	Hech Maze Maher	Kamanna	Marathi	
1984	Goshta Dhamal Namyachi	Namdeo (Namya)	Marathi	Filmfare Award for Best Actor – Marathi
1984	Bin Kamacha Navra	Tukaram (Tukya)	Marathi	
1984	Sasu Varchad Jawai	Babanrao Gawali	Marathi	
1984	Abodh	Hanuman	Hindi	
1984	Phulwari	Manu	Hindi	
1985	Sage Soyare	Aaba Sonar	Marathi	
1985	Khichdi	Jagdishwar Jagdale (Jaggu)	Marathi	
1985	Gaon Tasa Changla Pan Veshila Tangla	Aaglavey	Marathi	
1985	Dhum Dhadaka	Ashok Gupchup/ Yadunath Jawalkar	Marathi	
1985	Ghar Dwaar	Bahadur	Hindi	
1986	Khara Varasdar	Ranjeet	Marathi	
1986	Tuzya Vachun Karmena	Shyam Suryawanshi	Marathi	
1986	Gadbad Ghotala	Hemant Dhole	Marathi	
1986	Maa Beti	Shankar Prasad	Hindi	
1986	Muddat	Narayan	Hindi	
1986	Premasathi Vattel Te	Dr. Bhagaram Gaitonde	Marathi	
1986	Prem Karuya Khullam Khulla	Bajrang	Marathi	Maharashtra State Film Award for Best Actor
1986	Chakke Panje	Ashok	Marathi	
1986	Anandi Anand	Bhalchandra (Bhalu)	Marathi	
1986	Pratighaat	Lawyer	Hindi	
1988	Gammat Jammat	Phalgun Vadke	Marathi	
1988	Shiv Shakti	Karim	Hindi	
1988	Pandharichi Vari	Sada	Marathi	
1988	Mamla Porincha	Ballal Bagde	Marathi	
1988	Disata Tasa Nasata	CID Inspector Raghunath Deshmukh	Marathi	
1988	Saglikade Bombabomb	Sadashiv Khare	Marathi	
1988	Maza Pati Karodpati	Dinkar Luktuke / Bajirao Rangade	Marathi	Maharashtra State Film Award for Best Supporting Actor
1988	Ghar Ghar Ki Kahani	Lallu Ram	Hindi	
1988	Aurat Teri Yehi Kahani	Bhagwan Singh	Hindi	
1988	Ashi Hi Banwa Banwi	Dhananjay Mane	Marathi	
1989	Aaghat		Marathi	
1989	Madhu Chandrachi Ratra	Mahesh	Marathi	
1989	Navra Bayko	Ashok	Marathi	
1989	Kalat Nakalat	Chotu	Marathi	
1989	Ek Gadi Baaki Anaadi	Mr. Kirkire	Marathi	
1989	Maalmasala	Kumar Desai	Marathi	
1989	Bhutacha Bhau	Bandu	Marathi	
1989	Balache Baap Brahmachari	Vilas Varaatkar	Marathi	
1989	Atmavishwas	Vilas Zende	Marathi	
1989	Savala Maroti	Maroti	Marathi	
1989	Dharla Tar Chavtay	Raja Patil	Marathi	
1989	Pheka Pheki	Rajan Pradhan	Marathi	
1989	Bade Ghar Ki Beti	Kasturi	Hindi	
1990	Changu Mangu	Changu / Ramanna	Marathi	
1990	Baap Re Baap	Rajendra Pradhan	Marathi	
1990	Eka Peksha Ek	Inspector Sarjerao Shinde	Marathi	
1990	Eeja Beeja Teeja	Beeja / Brijbhushan	Marathi	
1990	Ghanchakkar	Manku Gaisode	Marathi	
1990	Tuzhi Mazhi Jamli Jodi	Prof. Ashok Pandit	Marathi	
1990	Dhamaal Bablya Ganpyachi	Ganpya	Marathi	
1990	Aamchyasarkhe Aamhich	Bhupal / Nirbhay Inamdar	Marathi	
1990	Shejari Shejari	Keshav Kulkarni	Marathi	
1990	Ina Mina Dika	Digambar Minapure	Marathi	
1990	Thamb Thamb Jau Nako Lamb	Shankar Sonba Savkar	Marathi	
1990	Chor Pe Mor	Anthony	Hindi	
1991	Yaara Dildara	Mr. Yadav	Hindi	
1991	Balidaan	Suryabhan Patil	Marathi	
1991	Anpekshit	Uttamrao Pawar	Marathi	
1991	Benaam Badsha	Vinay Chandra Rathod	Hindi	
1991	Mumbai Te Mauritius	Prem	Marathi	
1991	Jasa Baap Tashi Pore	Raja	Marathi	
1991	Godi Gulabi	Anil	Marathi	
1991	Chaukat Raja	Ganpat (Gana)	Marathi	
1991	Aflatoon	Bajrangrao Badve	Marathi	
1991	Aayatya Gharat Gharoba	Gopinath	Marathi	Maharashtra State Film Award for Best Supporting Actor
1992	Zhunj Tujhi Majhi	Bhallya	Marathi	
1992	Dhar Pakad	Nagesh	Marathi	
1992	Than Than Gopala	Subodh / Sunil	Marathi	
1992	Aikawa Te Nawalach	Dhairyasingh Dhurandhar	Marathi	
1992	Shubh Mangal Savdhan	Rajesh	Marathi	
1992	Jaagruti	Sevalal	Hindi	
1992	Meera Ka Mohan	Ramu	Hindi	
1992	Sarphira	Thief	Hindi	
1992	Prem Deewane	Somnath	Hindi	
1992	Naseebwala	Gangaram Lalwani	Hindi	
1993	Vaat Pahate Punvechi	Bhaiyyasaheb Urangaonkar	Marathi	
1993	Premankur	Anil Chiplunkar	Marathi	
1993	Tu Sukhkarta	Vinayak Vighnaharte	Marathi	
1993	Vajva Re Vajva	Uttam Tople	Marathi	
1993	Lapandav	Abhijeet Samarth	Marathi	
1993	Aapli Mansa	Raghunath	Marathi	Maharashtra State Film Award for Best Actor
1993	Ghayaal	Keshavrao/ Ramchandra Hire	Marathi	
1993	Dil Hai Betaab	Vikram's employee	Hindi	
1994	Sasar Maher	Ashok	Marathi	
1994	Vazir	CM Babasaheb Mohile	Marathi	Maharashtra State Film Award for Best Actor
1994	Aa Gale Lag Jaa	Dhaniram	Hindi	
1994	Sangdil Sanam	Bhalchander	Hindi	
1994	Nazar Ke Samne	Mamu	Hindi	
1995	Sukhi Sansarachi 12 Sutre	Kishore	Marathi	
1995	Painjan	Ajay Deshmukh	Marathi	
1995	Dhamal Jodi	Raja	Marathi	
1995	Suna Yeti Ghara	Ashok	Marathi	Filmfare Award for Best Actor – Marathi
1995	Topi Var Topi	Gopalrao Sheth	Marathi	
1995	Jamla Ho Jamla	Bapu Shelar	Marathi	
1995	Karan Arjun	Munshiji	Hindi	
1995	Aazmayish	Roshanlal	Hindi	
1995	Guddu	Baliya	Hindi	
1996	Army	Pascal	Hindi	
1996	Maaya Mamta	Sethji	Marathi	
1996	Gehra Raaz	Hasmukh	Hindi	
1996	Baal Brahmachari	Pyare Mohan	Marathi	
1997	Kunku	Vithoba	Marathi	
1997	Aisi Bhi Kya Jaldi Hai	Dr. Avinash	Hindi	
1997	Koyla	Vedji	Hindi	
1997	Judge Mujrim	PA Natwar	Hindi	
1997	Gupt: The Hidden Truth	Hawaldar Pandu	Hindi	
1997	Yes Boss	Johnny	Hindi	
1998	Bandhan	Chillu	Hindi	
1998	Pyaar Kiya Toh Darna Kya	Tadkalal	Hindi	
1998	Bhasma	Masanjogi	Marathi	
1999	Aai Thor Tujhe Upkar	Ashokrao	Marathi	
1999	Khoobsurat	Mahesh Chaudhary	Hindi	
1999	Sawai Hawaldar	Jamaldar Ashok Shinde	Marathi	Maharashtra State Film Award for Best Comedian
2000	Navra Majha Muthit Ga	Raosaheb Bhole	Marathi	
2000	Maherchi Pahuni	Ashok	Marathi	Maharashtra State Film Award for Best Comedian
2000	Bhajiwali Sakhu Hawaldar Bhiku	Bhiku	Marathi	
2000	Bhakti Hich Khari Shakti	Gauri's brother	Marathi	
2000	Beti No. 1	Ram Bhatnagar	Hindi	
2000	Joru Ka Ghulam	P. K. Girpade	Hindi	
2001	Afsana Dilwalon Ka	Pyarebhai	Hindi	
2001	Aashiq	Constable	Hindi	
2001	Jodi No.1	Ashok Rai	Hindi	
2001	Inteqam	Murli	Hindi	
2001	Ittefaq	Shambhu Shikari	Hindi	
2002	Kuch Tum Kaho Kuch Hum Kahein	Govind	Hindi	
2002	Kyaa Dil Ne Kahaa	Rajeev Patel	Hindi	
2004	Fukat Chambu Baburao	Baburao	Marathi	
2004	Sanshay Kallol		Marathi	
2004	Navra Maza Navsacha	Lalu	Marathi	
2004	Aai Tuza Ashirwad		Marathi	
2004	Thoda Tum Badlo Thoda Hum	Rani's father	Hindi	
2005	Aai No. 1	Booboo / Inspector Londhe	Marathi	
2005	Sawal Majhya Premacha	Babasaheb Nimbalkar	Marathi	
2005	Soon Ladki Sasarchi		Marathi	
2005	Deva Shappath Khota Sangen Khara Sangnar Nahi	Tatya Ugdepatil	Marathi	
2005	Qatal E Aam		Hindi	
2006	Akhand Saubhagyavati		Marathi	
2006	Kalubaichya Navan Changbhala	Balasaheb	Marathi	
2006	Pahili Sher Dusri Savvasher Navra Pavsher	Pandu	Marathi	
2007	Lapun Chhapun		Marathi	
2007	Karayla Gelo Ek	Mr. Kale	Marathi	
2007	Me Nahi Ho Tyatla	Raghav Kulkarni	Marathi	
2008	Sakhi	Suryakant Jagdale	Marathi	
2008	Ek Unad Divas	Vishwas Dabholkar	Marathi	
2008	Chalu Navra Bholi Bayko		Marathi	
2008	Sarkha Bhau Pakka Vairi	Vijay Deshmukh	Marathi	
2008	Saade Maade Teen	Ratan	Marathi	
2008	Aamhi Satpute	Anna	Marathi	
2008	Anolkhi Hey Ghar Maze	Jagannath Deshmukh	Marathi	
2008	Baba Lagin		Marathi	
2008	Aaba Zindabad	Aaba	Marathi	
2008	Adla Badli	Chandrakant Chandrakan	Marathi	
2008	Ek Daav Dhobi Pachhad	Dadasaheb Dandage	Marathi	
2008	Maai Ka Bitua	Himself	Marathi	Bhojpuri film
2009	Goshta Lagnanantarchi	Sakharam	Marathi	
2009	Balirajacha Rajya Yeu De	Bali's father	Marathi	
2009	Hastil Tyache Daat Distil		Marathi	
2009	Nishani Dava Anghatha	Headmaster Bhau Rathod	Marathi	
2009	Master Eke Master	Bappa More	Marathi	
2010	Aika Dajiba	Dajiba	Marathi	
2010	Tata Birla Ani Laila	Birla	Marathi	
2010	Most Wanted	Mama	Marathi	
2010	Shubha Mangal Savdhaan	Prataprao Tupe	Marathi	
2010	Ideachi Kalpana	Adv. Manohar Barshinge	Marathi	
2010	Familywala	Dhanasu Beggar	Hindi	
2011	Singham	Head Constable Prabhu Savarkar	Hindi	
2011	Kunasathi Kunitari		Marathi	
2011	Pakda Pakdi	Janya Mama	Marathi	
2013	Ekulti Ek	Mr. Mehta	Marathi	
2013	Yaa Topikhali Dadla Kay?	Sarpanch Vishwasrao	Marathi	
2014	Hututu	Dhananjay Dhanawade	Marathi	
2014	Aandhali Koshimbir	Bapu Sadavarte	Marathi	
2016	Vrundavan	Girdhar Inamdar	Marathi	
2017	Shentimental	PSI Pralhad Ghodke	Marathi	
2018	Me Shivaji Park	Digambar Sawant	Marathi	
2020	Prawaas	Abhijat Inamdar	Marathi	
2021	Kadhi Ambat Kadhi Goad	Aabasaheb	Marathi	
2021	Altun Paltun	Dhananjay	Marathi	
2021	Jivan Sandhya	Jivan Abhyankar	Marathi	
2022	Ved	Dinkar Jadhav	Marathi	
2024	Life Line	Dr. Vikram Desai	Marathi	
2024	Navra Maza Navsacha 2	Ticket Checker Lalu	Marathi	
2025	Ashi Hi Jamva Jamvi	Mohan	Marathi	
2026	Punha Ekda Sade Made Teen	Ratan	Marathi	
2026	Aadi Anant	Anantrao "Anant" Bhalerao	Marathi	

== Television ==
Year	Title	Role	Channel	Language	Notes
1986	Zopi Gelela Jaga Zala	Ashok	DD Sahyadri	Marathi	
1986	Chhoti Badi Baatein	Mamu	DD National	Hindi	
1987-1988	Aa Bail Mujhe Maar	Guest appearance	DD National	Hindi	
1995	Hum Paanch	Anand Mathur	Zee TV	Hindi	
1997	Chutki Bajake	Ishwar Devgan	Zee TV	Hindi	
1999	Professor Pyarelal	Professor Pyarelal	Zee TV	Hindi	
2000	Don't Worry Ho Jayega	Sanjay Bhandari	Sahara One	Hindi	
2011	Nana O Nana	Nana	Mi Marathi	Marathi	
2024	Ashok Ma. Ma	Ashok Majgaonkar	Colors Marathi	Marathi	

== Plays ==
1. Lagin Ghaai
2. Bandu Aani Batate Pohe – Hasavnyasaathi Janama Apula
3. Sarkh Chatit Dukhtay (2010)
4. Prema Tuza Rang Kasa
5. Manomilan
6. Andhikrut
7. Zala Ekdach
8. Vacuum Cleaner
9. Sangeet Sanshay Kallol
10. Hasat Khelat (2007)
11. Sangeet Sanshay kallol
12. Ek Unaad Diwas
