= MFK Award for Favourite Comedian =

Indian film award

Maharashtracha Favourite Kon? for Favourite Comedian
- Awarded for: Best Performance by an Actor in a Comic Role
- Country: India
- Presented by: Zee Talkies
- First award: Siddhartha Jadhav, De Dhakka (2009)
- Currently held by: Aroh Welankar; Rege (2014)

Maharashtracha Favourite Kon? Award for Favourite Comedian is given by Zee Talkies as part of its annual Maharashtracha Favourite Kon? ceremony for Marathi films. Although this awards started in 2009, but has not been awarded since 2015.

== Superlatives ==
Superlatives	Director	Record
Actor with most awards	Makarand Anaspure; Siddharth Jadhav	2
Actor with most nominations	Makarand Anaspure (2009-2013)	5
Actor with most consecutive nominations	Makarand Anaspure (2009-2013)	5
Actor with most nominations without ever winning	Bharat Jadhav	3
Eldest winner	Ashok Saraf (2010)	63
Youngest winner	Aroh Welankar (2014)	25

== Winners and nominees ==
Year	Photos of winners	Actor	Role(s)	Film	Ref.
2009		Siddhartha Jadhav †	Dhanajirao	De Dhakka	
2009		Nirmiti Sawant	Laxmibai	Sasu Numbari Jawai Dus Numbari	
2009		Makarand Anaspure	Tukaram	Sasu Numbari Jawai Dus Numbari	
2010		Ashok Saraf †	Dadasaheb Dandage	Ek Daav Dhobi Pachhad	
2010		Makarand Anaspure	Narayan Wagh	Gallit Gondhal, Dillit Mujra	
2010		Siddhartha Jadhav	Hanmiya	Huppa Huiyya	
2011		Makarand Anaspure †	Rajwardhan	Guldasta	
2011		Ashok Saraf	Advocate Manohar Barshinge	Ideachi Kalpana	
2011		Bharat Jadhav	Madhav Bhatt	Mast Challay Aamcha	
2012		Makarand Anaspure †	Vishwasrao Dhoke	Teen Bayka Fajiti Aika	
2012		Ankush Chaudhari	Sandy/ Suhas/ Subhaan/ Avinash	Zhakaas	
2012		Bharat Jadhav	Harya	Yedyanchi Jatra	
2012		Sachin Pilgaonkar	Shashi Phaterphekar	Teecha Baap Tyacha Baap	
2012		Vijay Patkar		Lau Ka Laath	
2013		Siddharth Jadhav †	Adimanav	Kho Kho	
2013		Bharat Jadhav	Kishan	No Entry Pudhe Dhoka Aahe	
2013		Pushkar Shotri	Dhananjay	Sanshay Kallol	
2013		Prathamesh Parab	Vishu	Balak Palak	
2013		Makarand Anaspure	Popat Jhadbuke	Pipani	
2014		Aroh Welankar †	Anirudha Rege	Rege	
