= Don't Worry Ho Jayega =

- Genre: Comedy drama
- Written by: Ashok Patol
- Directed by: Kapil Kapoor
- Starring: See below
- Theme music composer: Shreerang Aras
- Opening theme: "Don't Worry Ho Jayega" by Abhijeet Bhattacharya
- Country of origin: India
- Original language: Hindi
- No. of seasons: 1

Production
- Executive producer: Nivedita Joshi Saraf
- Editor: Jugal Kishore
- Camera setup: Multi-camera
- Running time: 24 minutes

Original release
- Network: Sahara TV
- Release: 4 April 2000

Don't Worry Ho Jayega (transl. Don't worry will happen) is an Indian television comedy series that aired on Sahara TV. The series stars Ashok Saraf and is produced by his wife Nivedita Joshi Saraf. The series premiered on 4 April 2000.

== Cast ==
- Ashok Saraf as Sanjay Bhandari
- Jatin Kanakia as Moti
- Bharti Achrekar
- Sheela Sharma
- Vijay Patkar as Ramesh
- Sudhir Joshi
