= Ghar Shrimantacha =

- Written by: Hemant Edlabadkar

Premiere
- Directed by: Harshad Joshi

Ghar Shrimantacha is a Marathi theater play starring Sudhir Joshi, Aasha Kale, Atul Parchure, Neelam Shirke and Shekhar Fadke in leading roles. It portrays the life a middle class Marathi family.

== Plot ==
The play takes us through the life of a middle class Maharashtrian family, the Kulkarnis. Mr. Kulkarni (Sudhir Joshi), his wife Neela (Aasha Kale) and their children Prashant (Shekhar Fadke) and Seema (Neelam Shirke) stay in a rented apartment. The family own 10 Shaligrams. They are not from a well to do family. They get to know that one of the Shaligram stone has a gem inside it. They sell it to earn 6 Lakh rupees, which improves the financial condition.

The children propose to sell the remaining Shaligrams to earn more money. Kulkarni agrees to get the stones verified from the local goldsmith, but Neela apposes it as the Shaligrams are sacred stones.

This competition of money versus tradition leads to a tiff in the family. The play depicts how the tiff is solved by the parents in a playful and light manner.
