= Maana Ke Hum Yaar Nahi =

Indian family drama television series

- Genre: Family drama Romance
- Created by: Cockcrow & Shaika Entertainment
- Written by: Pallavi Mehta
- Directed by: Gautam Parvi; Jaffer Shaikh; Abhay Chhabra; Sadanand Vishwakarma
- Creative directors: Khushboo Deewana; Mona Arora
- Starring: Manjeet Makkar; Divya Patil
- Composer: Trishanku Prasad
- Country of origin: India
- Original language: Hindi
- No. of seasons: 1
- No. of episodes: 99

Production
- Executive producer: Christopher Nadar
- Producers: Pradeep Kumar; Rajesh Ram Singh; Pia Bajpiee; Shaika Parween
- Cinematography: Jeetendra Pandit
- Camera setup: Multi camera
- Running time: 20–22 minutes
- Production companies: Cockcrow Entertainment; Shaika Films

Original release
- Network: StarPlus
- Release: 29 October 2025 – 26 January 2026

Maana Ke Hum Yaar Nahi (transl. I Accept that We Aren't Friends) is an Indian Hindi-language drama television series premiered from 29 October 2025 to 26 January 2026 on Star Plus and streams digitally on JioHotstar. Produced by Cockcrow Entertainment and Shaika Films, the series stars Manjeet Makkar as Krishna and Divya Patil as Khushi. The story revolves around the two characters entering into a contract marriage.

== Plot ==
The story follows the lives of Khushi and Krishna that get interviewed. Khushi is a determined woman who has worked hard since a very young age due to her father's sickness. However, when things turn too much to take, to support him, she irons clothes for a living. But her struggles push her to make a very unusual choice when she goes for an interview to become a contract bride. Krishna, on the other hand, is shown as someone who easily fits into any role, whether it is a doctor, a police officer, or now, stepping into the shoes of a groom in this contract marriage.

Soon the story takes whole new turn as Khushi and Krishna meets in a courtroom. The duo has agreed for a contract marriage and are officially bound together. For Khushi, this is a life-changing step, taken purely out of necessity, not romance. However, Krishna's personality adds an interesting twist to this serious situation. He appears very charming and relaxed, suggesting that his easygoing nature will make their unusual relationship quite fascinating.

== Cast ==
=== Main ===
- Manjeet Makkar as Krishna: Khushi's husband (2025–2026)
- Divya Patil as Khushi: Krishna's wife (2025–2026)

=== Recurring ===
- Kishori Shahane as Nandita Mehra: Krishna's grandmother (2025–2026)
- Naina Gupta as Devika (2025–2026)
- Vinod Kapoor as Baldev Mehra (2025–2026)
- Mridul Kumar as Vikram Mehra (2025–2026)
- Shraddha Tripathi as Anushka: Krishna's ex-lover (2025–2026)
- Sagar Saini as Rajkumar (2025–2026)
- Siddharth Sibal as Malik (2025–2026)
- Aryan Raajput as Karan (2025–2026)
- Isha Pandhe as Sweety (2025–2026)
- Tina Kashyap as Naina (2025–2026)
- Aditya Singh
- Ashok Chaudhary
- Maitri Bhanushali
- Yashashree Bhish
- Vishal Sharma

== Production ==
=== Development ===
The series was produced by Cockcrow Entertainment and Shaika Films. It was announced in September 2025 and was originally scheduled to premiere in October 2025. Its launch was subsequently postponed before it premiered on 29 October 2025.

=== Casting ===
Manjeet Makkar was signed to portray male lead Krishna. Makkar described Krishna as a conman and compared the character's personality to Romi, played by Arshad Warsi in the 1998 film Hero Hindustani. Kishori Shahane was cast in a grandmother role. Naina Gupta entered the series as Devika.
