= Dhananjay Mane =

Fictional character

- Ashi Hi Banwa Banwi character
- Ashok Saraf as Dhananjay Mane
- First appearance: Ashi Hi Banwa Banwi; (1988)
- Created by: Vasant Sabnis; Sachin Pilgaonkar; V. Shantaram
- Portrayed by: Ashok Saraf

In-universe information
- Gender: Male
- Occupation: Salesman
- Family: Shantanu Mane (younger brother)
- Spouse: Madhuri (real); Parvati Mane (fake)
- Home: Pashan road
- Nationality: Indian

Dhananjay Mane (Marathi: [d̪ʰə.ˈn̪ən̪.d͡ʒəj ˈmaː.ɳe]) is a fictional character from the 1988 Marathi film Ashi Hi Banwa Banwi, portrayed by Ashok Saraf. He works as a salesman in a cosmetics store in Pune and is secretly in love with his modern employer, Madhuri, portrayed by Ashwini Bhave. He faces humorous challenges while living with his thrifty landlord, Vishwasrao Sarpotdar (portrayed by Sudhir Joshi), and hosting his unemployed friends. The character is developed by Sachin Pilgaonkar, Vasant Sabnis, and V. Shantaram, which aims to be a protagonist who faces the daily struggles of a common man. The last name "Mane" is taken from Shantaram's chartered accountant, Kisan Mane. Portrayed with depth and humour by Saraf, the character has become a widely loved character in Marathi cinema, depicting the struggles of unemployment and lack of economic stability.

== Fictional biography ==
Dhananjay Mane is a street-smart salesman working in a Pune cosmetics store, harbouring a secret crush for his boss, Madhuri. Living with his frugal landlord, Mr. Sarpotdar, Dhananjay is joined by his brother Shantanu, a medical student. They secretly host their childhood friends, Sudhir and Parshya, who are struggling to find work. After a drunken confrontation with Sarpotdar, they face eviction and desperately seek new housing.

They find an elderly widow, Leelabai, who offers rooms but insists they must be married couples. To comply, Dhananjay and Shantanu persuade Sudhir and Parshya to dress as women, creating comedic chaos. As they settle in, romantic entanglements unfold: Sudhir falls for Leelabai's niece, Manisha, while Shantanu concocts a story to appease his girlfriend Sushma.

Their deception is threatened when Tanu, Leelabai's servant, uncovers their secret. After a series of misunderstandings and confrontations, Leelabai ultimately accepts the friends as her own sons, recognizing their intentions were pure. The film concludes with joyous marriages and a heartfelt family photo, celebrating their newfound bonds.

== Development ==
The character of Dhananjay Mane was created by Sachin Pilgaonkar, V. Shantaram, and Vasant Sabnis, aimed a coherent protagonist who faces struggles and aspirations of daily people. Initially, a last name was not required for the character, but it became necessary when the character Parasha needed to be addressed as him. The choice of the last name "Mane" was inspired by V. Shantaram's chartered accountant, Kisan Mane, who happened to visit the office during a brainstorming session, finalised Pilgaonkar and by writer Vasant Sabnis. The dialogue "Dhananjay Mane Ithech Rahatat Ka?" by portrayal Parshya (played by Laxmikant Berde) is also come during this session.

== Legacy ==
The character Dhananjay Mane, portrayed by Ashok Saraf, has left a lasting impact on popular culture, evoking nostalgia among fans with his memorable lines and comedic scenarios. The popularity of Ashi Hi Banwa Banwi is often linked to its iconic dialogues, especially the widely quoted "Dhananjay Mane Ithech Rahatat Ka?" ("Does Dhananjay Mane live here?") — delivered by Parshuram "Parshya" (portrayed by Laxmikant Berde) has become a cultural milestone in Marathi cinema. Viewers connected with his sincerity and the hilarious situations he encountered. The Marathi play "Dhananjay Mane Ithech Rahtat Ka?" is named after this iconic dialogue. Another notable dialogue, "Ha Majha bayko, Parvati" ("He is my wife, Parvati", referring to Parshya dressed as a woman), was improvised by Saraf and not part of the original script. In interviews, he mentioned that his close friendship with Laxmikant Berde prompted to refer to characters in a familiar manner, resulting in a spontaneous line that became immensely popular, inspiring numerous memes and merchandise in Marathi culture. The film further features multiple dialogues that remain fondly remembered across generations. Notable examples include "Tumhi Dilele Sattar Rupaye Varale" ("The 70 Rupees you gave have died"), "Aamchya Shejari Rahate, Navaryane Taklay Tila" ("She is our neighbour, her husband has abandoned her"), and "Limboo Colour Chi Saadi" ("Lemon coloured saree").
