= Nishani Dava Anghatha =

2009 Marathi film

- Directed by: Purshottam Berde
- Based on: Nishani Dava Angatha by Ramesh Ingle Utradkar
- Produced by: Dilip Jadhav
- Starring: Makarand Anaspure; Ashok Saraf; Nirmiti Sawant
- Production company: Ashtavinayak chitra
- Release date: 2009
- Running time: 2 hr
- Country: India
- Language: Marathi

Nishani Dava Anghata (transl. Symbol left thumb) is a 2009 Marathi satire Comedy film starring Makarand Anaspure, Ashok Saraf and Nirmiti Sawant in pivotal role.

The film debunks the Indian government's adult literacy program of Sarva Shiksha Abhiyan. It is an adaptation of Ramesh Ingale Utradkar's novel of the same name.

== Plot ==
In the quaint village of Savargaon, Buldhana, Maharashtra, the efforts of six male and female teachers to kickstart an adult literacy program are met with unexpected hurdles. Despite their determination, both reluctant participants and teachers stand in the way of progress, threatening the initiative's success.

With the intervention of the headmaster, teachers, and support of villagers, a plan is hatched, involving Dukre Guruji, a volunteer with a knack for creative problem-solving. Together, they concoct a scheme to stage a faux adult literacy class, complete with dummy students—secretly literate villagers masquerading as learners.

As the plot unfolds, the village becomes a stage for showcasing the absurdity of the situation while delivering a social message on the importance of literacy. The film sheds light on the challenges faced by rural communities in accessing education and the ways in which they navigate such obstacles.

== Cast ==
- Makarand Anaspure - Dukre Guruji
- Ashok Saraf - Headmaster Bhau Rathod
- Nirmiti Sawant - Bokil Madam
- Veena Jamkar
- Bharat Jadhav
- Vinay Apte
- Sandip Pathak
- Dilip Prabhavalkar
- Purnima Ahire
- Bharat Ganeshpure
- Mangesh Desai
- Hrishikesh Joshi
- Sanjay Narvekar

== Production ==
The film is an adaptation of author Ramesh Ingale Utradkar's novel Nishani dava anghatha. The novel tried to debunk the Adult education programme of Indian and Maharashtra government. The film, shot on location in real schools., portrays the debacle of the programme.

== Release ==
The film was released on television on Zee Talkies.

== Reception ==
The Times of India places Nishani Dava Anghatha in its list of Marathi films about education, stating that "it brings out the irony of the Government's literacy campaign which aims at achieving 100 per cent literacy rate in the villages of Maharastra. It starred Ashok Saraf, Makarand Anaspure, Nirmiti Sawant and Mohan Agashe in pivotal roles."

== See also ==
- Illiteracy
