= Saglikade Bombabomb =

1988 Marathi film

- VCD Cover
- Directed by: Avinash Thakur
- Screenplay by: Sachin Pilgaonkar
- Produced by: Chintu Dhavale
- Starring: Ashok Saraf; Varsha Usgaonkar; Nilu Phule; Kishori Shahane; Prashant Damle
- Cinematography: Ram Alam
- Edited by: Chintu Dhavale
- Music by: Arun Paudwal
- Production company: Sneha Chitra
- Distributed by: Sachin Pilgaonkar
- Release date: 28 April 1989
- Running time: 133 minutes
- Country: India
- Language: Marathi

Saglikade Bombabomb is a 1989 Indian Marathi-language comedy film directed by Avinash Thakur and Produced by Chintu Dhavale under the banner of Sneha Chitra and written by Sachin Pilgaonkar. The film stars an ensemble cast of Ashok Saraf, Varsha Usgaonkar, Nilu Phule, Prashant Damle, Kishori Shahane, Vijay Patkar, Sachin Pilgaonkar and Nayantara in guest appearances. The film's soundtrack is composed by Arun Paudwal received a positive response from audiences, particularly from the youth. Every song in the movie was a hit and well-received by the audience.

== Plot ==
Appasaheb Dharadhar runs a newspaper called Dainik Bombabomb, but it's not doing well, and he has a lot of people asking for money every day. He relies on his reporter, Sada Khare, but even Sada can't find any news to save the newspaper. Appasaheb's daughter, Mala Dharadhar, comes home with her dance teacher, Guruji Krishna Kumar, who wants to marry her. However, Appasaheb wants Mala to marry someone famous.

To solve the newspaper problem and find a famous match for his daughter, Appasaheb sends Sada to interview a criminal in Mumbai. Sada faces some trouble along the way but ends up helping an actress named Rajnibala. The tricky part is, he doesn't recognize her because of her makeup. Despite Sada's failed interview, Appasaheb comes up with a plan to save his business.

Appasaheb decides to create a fake story to make Sada look famous. He publishes an article saying that Rajnibala is in love with Sada. This news spreads quickly, and Sada becomes famous. Now, Appasaheb wants Sada to marry Mala. However, Rajnibala, who is not happy about the false story, comes to scold Sada. But when she sees him, she remembers how he helped her, and she decides to make their real relationship public.

The story takes another twist when Rajnibala's lover, King Kong, and Guruji Krishna Kumar plan to harm Sada. At the same time, Appasaheb's wife, Durga, teams up with King Kong and Kumar to teach Appasaheb a lesson for his behavior towards women. So, the story unfolds with lots of surprises and challenges for everyone involved.

== Cast ==
- Ashok Saraf as Sadashiv (Sada) Khare; Reporter of Bombabomb
- Varsha Usgaonkar as Rajnibala; Famous actress
- Nilu Phule as Appasaheb Dharadhar; Owner of Bombabomb
- Kishori Shahane as Mala Dharadhar; Appasaheb's daughter
- Prashant Damle as Guruji Krishna Kumar; Mala's love interest & dance teacher
- Manorama Wagle as Durga Akka Dharadhar; Appasaheb's wife
- Viju Khote as Kishanrao Pathare (King Kong); Rajnibala's boyfriend & Main antagonist
- Vijay Patkar as Naroba Nudbude; Editor of Bombabomb
- Ravi Patwardhan as Babasaheb Shinde; a businessman

=== Cameo appearance ===
- Nayantara as Maya Mhapsekar; Appasaheb's girlfriend
- Jaywant Wadkar as Molester in Rajnibala's film
- Suhas Bhalekar as Organizer of Pune event
- Madhu Apte as Organizer of Pune event
- Sachin Pilgaonkar as Kumar; an actor from Rajnibala's film & Guest appearance in song "Thamb Ga Sajani"

== Soundtrack ==
Saglikade Bombabomb

Soundtrack album by Arun Paudwal
- Released: 1989
- Genre: Feature film soundtrack
- Length: 23:49
- Language: Marathi
- Label: Ishtar Music

Official audio
- Saglikade Bombabomb- Full Album on YouTube

Arun Paudwal composed music and lyrics are written by Sudhir Moghe.

Track listing
#	Title	Singer (s)	Lyrics	Length
1	"Thamb Ga Sajani"	Sachin, Anuradha Paudwal	Sudhir Moghe	5:42
2	"Na Sangtach Aaj He Kale Mala"	Suresh Wadkar, Anuradha Paudwal	Sudhir Moghe	5:19
3	"Mala Pariche Pankh Milale"	Anuradha Paudwal	Sudhir Moghe	5:49
4	"Jaa Jaa Nako Maru Tu Gamja"	Amit Kumar, Suresh Wadkar	Sudhir Moghe	7:16
