= Lifeline (2024 film) =

Indian Marathi-language drama film

- Directed by: Sahil Shirwaikar
- Starring: Ashok Saraf Madhav Abhyankar Hemangi Kavi
- Release date: 2 August 2024 (India)
- Country: India
- Language: Marathi

Lifeline is a 2024 Indian Marathi-language drama film directed by Sahil Shirwaikar. The film stars Ashok Saraf, Madhav Abhyankar, and Hemangi Kavi in lead roles. It explores the conflict between traditional beliefs and modern scientific perspectives, addressing social issues through a narrative centered on human relationships and societal norms. Lifeline was released on 2 August 2024.

== Plot ==
Lifeline delves into the tension between age-old customs and contemporary science, weaving a story that examines the impact of these opposing forces on individuals and communities. While specific plot details remain limited, the film is noted for its focus on a socially relevant theme, portrayed through the experiences of its central characters, played by Ashok Saraf, Madhav Abhyankar, and Hemangi Kavi.

== Cast ==
- Ashok Saraf as Doctor Vikram Desai
- Madhav Abhyankar as Kirwant Brahmin Kedarnath Agnihotri
- Hemangi Kavi
- Sandhya Kute
- Bharat Dabholkar
- Jaywant Wadkar
- Sharmila Shinde
- Sushrut Mankani

== Production ==
The film was directed by Sahil Shirwaikar announced in early 2024 as a project tackling the dichotomy between tradition and modernity, with Ashok Saraf’s involvement highlighted as a key draw.

== Soundtrack ==
The film’s soundtrack includes the song "Hotyach Navhata Jhala," which was released prior to the film’s premiere. The song garnered attention for its emotional resonance and was highlighted in promotional materials.

== Release ==
Lifeline was theatrically released on 2 August 2024. The film’s announcement emphasized its thematic focus on the clash between ancient beliefs and modern science, generating anticipation among audiences.Promotions further highlighted Ashok Saraf’s return to Marathi cinema as a significant aspect.

== Reception ==
The film received varied responses from critics. Writing for Sakal, a reviewer praised Lifeline for its effective commentary on social issues, describing it as a compelling exploration of the clash between tradition and science. Similarly, a critic from Maharashtra Times lauded the film’s impactful storytelling and its relevance to contemporary societal debates. In contrast, Lokmat’s review acknowledged the strong performances of Ashok Saraf, Madhav Abhyankar, and Hemangi Kavi, but did not elaborate extensively on the narrative’s reception. Loksatta highlighted Sahil Shirwaikar’s direction and the film’s thematic depth, noting its appeal to audiences interested in meaningful cinema.
