= Bhutacha Bhau =

1989 film directed by Sachin Pilgaonkar

- VCD cover
- Directed by: Sachin Pilgaonkar
- Story by: Srinivas Bhagne; Sachin Pilgaonkar
- Produced by: Shailendra Singh
- Starring: Ashok Saraf; Sachin Pilgaonkar; Varsha Usgaonkar; Jayram Kulkarni; Laxmikant Berde
- Music by: Arun Paudwal
- Production companies: Padmini films Private limited; Nandini films
- Release date: 21 March 1989
- Running time: 150 minutes
- Country: India
- Language: Marathi

Bhutacha Bhau (transl. Ghost's brother) is a 1989 Indian Marathi-language drama film directed by Sachin Pilgaonkar and produced by Shailendra Singh. The film stars Ashok Saraf, Sachin Pilgaonkar, Varsha Usgaonkar, Jayram Kulkarni and Laxmikant Berde in lead roles. It was theatrically released on 21 March 1989.

== Plot ==
Bandu is killed by three goons Appaji, Indrasen and Dayaram then becomes his ghost. He travels to find his long lost brother and mother. His younger brother Nandu is a timid person. Bandu meets him and tells him how these goons killed him and asks him to come to the village. Bandu's spirit is visible only to Nandu. Bandu's spirit enters Nandu's body several times and together they fight these goons.

== Cast ==
=== Lead cast ===
- Ashok Saraf as Bandu
- Sachin Pilgaonkar as Nandu/Nandkumar
- Varsha Usgaonkar as "Anju" Anjali
- Jayram Kulkarni as Rao Saheb
- Bharati Acharekar as Nandu's mother
- Sudhir Joshi as Appaji
- Viju Khote as Indrasen Angre
- Anant Jog as Dayaram Sonawane
- Laxmikant Berde as Barko
- Rekha Rao as Bitti
- Johnny Lever as Gappaji

=== Supporting cast ===
- Satish Tungare
- Mohan Mungi
- Avinash Thakur
- Kanchan Nayak
- Vijay Patkar as Ward boy
- Bipin Varti as Tony
- Madhav Mokashi
- Suresh Rane
- Avinash Thakur as Inspector
- Madhu Apte as Traffic Hawaldaar
- Maya Jadhav as Lavani performer

== Production ==
This film is directed by Sachin Pilgaonkar. The film was shot at Seth Studios, Rajkamal Kalamandir, Essel Studios and Film City, Mumbai. Action sequences was directed by Veeru Devagan. The sets was made by art director R.Varman and dubbing work was done at Ketnav Evershine Studio.

== Soundtrack ==
Bhutacha Bhau

Soundtrack album by Arun Paudwal
- Released: 1989
- Genre: Feature film soundtrack
- Length: 25:08
- Language: Marathi
- Label: T-Series

Official audio
- Bhutacha Bhau - Full Album on YouTube

Music and background is given by Arun Paudwal. The songs of this film written by Shantaram Naandgaonkar and Pravin Danve and recorded by Aasha Bhosle, Shailendra Singh, Anuradha Paudwal, Suresh Wadkar, Kavita Krushnamurti and Sachin Pilgaonkar.

All lyrics are written by Shantaram Naandgaokar.

No.	Title	Length
1.	"Mi Kashi Tula Re"	4:56
2.	"Rangaan Gori"	6:35
3.	"Sapta Suranchya"	4:53
4.	"Majhya Angaat"	8:25
Total length:		25:08
