= Kishori Shahane =

Indian film & television actress

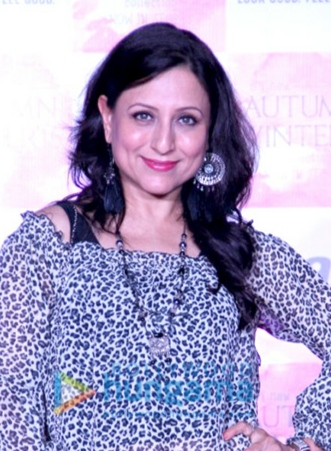
- Shahane at The Premiere autumn winter'15 collected by MAX
- Born: Kishori Shahane; April 23, 1968 (age 58); Mumbai, Maharashtra, India
- Education: Mithibai College
- Occupations: Actress; Dancer; Producer; Director
- Years active: 1986–present
- Spouse: Deepak Balraj Vij (m. 1993)
- Children: Bobby Vij
- Relatives: Anand Balraj Vij, alias Andy (Brother-in-Law)
- Awards: Full list

Kishori Shahane Vij is an Indian classical and folk dancer and actress who works in the Marathi and Hindi films and television. She is married to Hindi filmmaker Deepak Balraj Vij. She is known for her roles in Kohi Apna Sa, Shakti - Astitva Ke Ehsaas Ki, Ishq Mein Marjawan and Ghum Hai Kisikey Pyaar Mein. In 2019 she participated in the reality show Bigg Boss Marathi 2.

== Early life and career ==
While at Mithibai College, Kishori was crowned Miss Mithibai at the college known as the cultural hub of Mumbai. She entered into Marathi films and shot to fame with Maherchi Sadi and Wajva Re Wajva. Her stage performances in plays like Moruchi Mavshi (Marathi) and Aadhe Adhure (Hindi), directed by Amal Allana bought her recognition as an actress. She worked in Marathi blockbuster films like Prem Karuya Khulllam khulla, Majha Pati Karodpati,Balache Baap Brahmachari, Changu Mangu, Saglikade Bombabomb, Ek Daav Dhobi Pachhad, and Navra Maza Navsacha. Her role in Hindi movies like Pyaar Mein Twist and Red: The Dark Side directed by Vikram Bhatt put forward her ability to play different roles.

Kishori then switched over to Hindi TV serials and continued to work in Hindi and Marathi films. She became popular with her performance in serials like Ghar Ek Mandir, Jassi Jaisi Koi Nahin and Sindoor.

As a filmmaker, her Marathi film Mohatyachi Renuka won the Maharashtra State Award 2007 for best editing. The film was produced and directed by Kishori. She is a producer who helped to make a film about the life of Sai Baba of Shirdi. Her next venture Malik Ek (Hindi) was based on the life of Sai Baba and had Jackie Shroff in the lead role. She then launched her next Marathi film Aika Dajiba. She played the role of a transgender in the soap opera Shakti - Astitva Ke Ehsaas Ki, aired on Colors TV, in 2016.

From October 2020 until January 2024, she was seen in the drama series, Ghum Hai Kisikey Pyaar Meiin, playing the role of the matriarch of the Chavan family, Bhavani. This went on to winning her a number of Awards including Indian Television Academy Awards, Indian Telly Awards, Iconic Gold Awards for Best Actress in Negative Role.

Shahane portrayed Nandita in Maana Ke Hum Yaar Nahi From October 2025 to January 2026. From June to September 2026, she was seen portraying Indrani Basu in Leena Gangopadhyay's Sairaab on StarPlus. In October, she entered Colors' Mannat – Har Khushi Paane Ki post its second season as Sarika Oberoi.

== Personal life ==
Deepak Balraj Vij, a Hindi filmmaker noticed her talent. He directed Hafta Bandh, Bomb Blast and two more films with her. During the making of Hafta Bandh in 1991, they grew closer and later got married.

== Filmography ==
=== Films ===
Year	Title	Role	Language
1986	Karma	Heena	Hindi
1987	Prem Karuya Khullam Khulla	Seema	Marathi
1987	Anandi Anand	Shama	Marathi
1988	Maza Pati Karodpati	Hema Deshmukh	Marathi
1989	Saglikade Bombabomb	Mala Dharadhar	Marathi
1989	Nasti Aafat	Mona	Marathi
1989	Balache Baap Brahmachari	Shyamala Tavdaane	Marathi
1989	Atmavishwas	Asavari Mangalkar	Marathi
1990	Changu Mangu	Mini Khatle	Marathi
1990	Dhumakool	Lalita Pradhan	Marathi
1991	Aayatya Gharat Gharoba	Shobhana Kasture	Marathi
1991	Hafta Bandh	Harish's Wife	Hindi
1991	Pyar Ka Devta	Sujata Kumar	Hindi
1991	Maherchi Sadi	Bijli	Marathi
1991	Bandal Baaz	Anju	Marathi
1991	Jeeva Sakha	Julie	Marathi
1992	Gruhpravesh	Rita Fernandez	Marathi
1992	Kinchali	Veena Anand	Marathi
1993	Aikava Te Navalach	Ragini	Marathi
1993	Wajawa Re Wajawa	Megha	Marathi
1993	Ram Rahim	Kishori Sare	Marathi
1993	Bomb Blast	Naina	Hindi
2001	Shirdi Sai Baba	(Producer and Director)	Hindi
2004	Navra Maza Navsacha	Lavani Dancer (special appearance)	Marathi
2005	Mumbai Godfather	Kamla	Hindi
2005	Pyaar Mein Twist	Madhu Loc	Hindi
2006	Shaadi Se Pehle	Mrs. Bhalla	Hindi
2006	Mohatyachi Renuka	Renuka	Marathi
2007	Good Boy, Bad Boy	Teacher	Hindi
2007	Red: The Dark Side		Hindi
2007	Fear		Hindi
2008	Superstar	Mrs. Saxena	Hindi
2009	Ek Daav Dhobi Pachhad	Hema	Marathi
2010	Aika Dajiba	Rukmini	Marathi
2010	Milenge Milenge	Cameo appearance	Hindi
2010	Benny and Babloo	Tejaswini	Hindi
2010	Malik Ek	Shakuntala	Hindi
2011	Shagird	Mrs. Hanumant Singh	Hindi
2012	Langar	Godavari	Marathi
2012	Chhodo Kal Ki Baatein	Kaamwali Bai	Hindi
2013	Policegiri	Sehar's Mother	Hindi
2013	Yeda	Savitri Kulkarni	Marathi
2013	Ekulti Ek	Madhura	Marathi
2013	Narbachi Wadi	Renuka Khot	Marathi
2014	Ya Rab	Dr. Shabana	Hindi
2014	Anuradha	Masterjee's Wife	Hindi
2014	Kahin Hai Mera Pyar	Priya's Mother	Hindi
2014	Nati	Mahesh's wife	Marathi
2014	Badlapur Boys	Mother	Hindi
2014	Khairlanjichya Mathyawar	Surekha	Marathi
2015	Dhurandhar Bhatawdekar	Pushpa Damle	Marathi
2015	Classmates	College Principal	Marathi
2016	Mohenjo Daro	Bima	Hindi
2017	Simran	Kumud	Hindi
2017	Machine	Maya	Hindi
2017	Heartbeats	Sharda Zinta	Hindi
2019	PM Narendra Modi	Indira Gandhi	Hindi
2019	Blank	Dewan's Wife	Hindi
2024	Dharmarakshak Mahaveer Chhatrapati Sambhaji Maharaj: Part 1	Rajmata Jijaubai Bhonsale	Marathi
2025	Sikandar	Minister Rakesh Pradhan's Wife	Hindi

=== Television ===
Year	Title	Language	Role	Notes
1993	Junoon	Hindi	Chandni	Episodes 1-2
1997-2001	Damini	Marathi	Damini's sister	
2000	Jap Tap Vratt	Hindi	Devi, Sandhya and Chhaya	
2000	Shree Ganesh	Hindi	Maharani Prasuti	
2000	Ghar Ek Mandir	Hindi	Sapna	
2000	Abhimaan	Hindi	Sukanya Mohan Kumar Chauhan	
2001	Kohi Apna Sa	Hindi	Khushi's mother	
2001	Bandini	Marathi		
2003	Meri Biwi Wonderful	Hindi	Rani Pari	Episodic appearance
2005-2006	Jassi Jaissi Koi Nahin	Hindi	Doctor	
2005-2006	Sinndoor Tere Naam Ka	Hindi	Uma Agarwal	
2006	Kabhie To Nazar Milao	Hindi	Sunaina's mother	
2006-2008	Solhah Singaarr	Hindi	Triveni Tribhuvan Chaturvedi	
2008	Saas v/s Bahu	Hindi	Contestant	
2008	Waqt Batayega Kaun Apna Kaun Paraya	Hindi	Yashomati Raichoudhary	
2010	Vrundavan	Marathi	Kartiki's mother-in-law	
2010	Aise Karo Naa Vidaa	Hindi	Rani Maa	
2010-2012	Yahan Main Ghar Ghar Kheli	Hindi	Shaili's mother	
2011	Don Kinare Doghi Aapan	Marathi	Asmita	
2012	Swapnanchya Palikadle	Marathi	Vasundhara	
2013-2014	Pradhanmantri	Hindi	Pupul Jayakar	
2013-2014	Do Dil Ek Jaan	Hindi	Antara's mother	
2014-2015	Everest	Hindi	Sarita Rawat	
2015	Darr Sabko Lagta Hai	Hindi	Episodic role	Episode 40
2016	Intezaar	Hindi	Episodic role	
2016-2017	Shakti – Astitva Ke Ehsaas Ki	Hindi	Guru Maa	
2017	Rishta Likhenge Hum Naya	Hindi	Padma Maan Singh	
2017-2018	Jadubai Jorat	Marathi	Mallika	
2018	Ishq Mein Marjawan	Hindi	Veena Devi	
2019	Kanala Khada	Marathi	Guest appearance	
2019	Bigg Boss Marathi 2	Marathi	Contestant	(4th Runner Up)
2020–2024	Ghum Hai Kisikey Pyaar Meiin	Hindi	Bhavani Nagesh Chavan	
2021	Sukh Mhanje Nakki Kay Asta!	Marathi	Herself	Cameo appearance
2022	Kitchen Kallakar	Marathi	Herself	Guest appearance
2022	Ravivaar With Star Parivaar	Hindi	Contestant	Appearance as Bhavani
2023	Pinkicha Vijay Aso!	Marathi	Dr. Devyani	
2023–2025	Kaise Mujhe Tum Mil Gaye	Hindi	Babita Singh Ahuja	
2025	Maana Ke Hum Yaar Nahi	Hindi		
2026	Sairaab	Hindi	Indrani Adinath Basu	
2026–present	Mannat – Har Khushi Paane Ki 2	Hindi	Sarika Oberoi	

=== Theater ===
==== Marathi ====
- Moruchi Mavshi
- Durga Zhali Gauri
- Mi Tujhya Pathishi Ahe
- Kandapohe Tuzya Ni Mazya Premache
- Mahanatya Sahyadri

==== Hindi ====
- Aadhe Adhure
- Benny And Babloo

=== Web series ===
Year	Title	Role	Ref.
2020	The Chargesheet: Innocent or Guilty?	Gayatri Dixit	

== Awards and achievements ==
Year	Awards	Category	Work	Result	Ref
2021	Iconic Gold Awards	Iconic Most Popular Negative Actress	Ghum Hai Kisikey Pyaar Meiin	Won	
2022	Indian Television Academy Awards	Best Actress in a Negative Role	Ghum Hai Kisikey Pyaar Meiin	Won	
2023	Indian Telly Awards	Best Actress in a Negative Role	Ghum Hai Kisikey Pyaar Meiin	Won	
2023	Gold Awards	Best Actress in a Negative Role - Jury	Ghum Hai Kisikey Pyaar Meiin	Won	
