= Sachin Pilgaonkar =

Indian actor (born 1957)

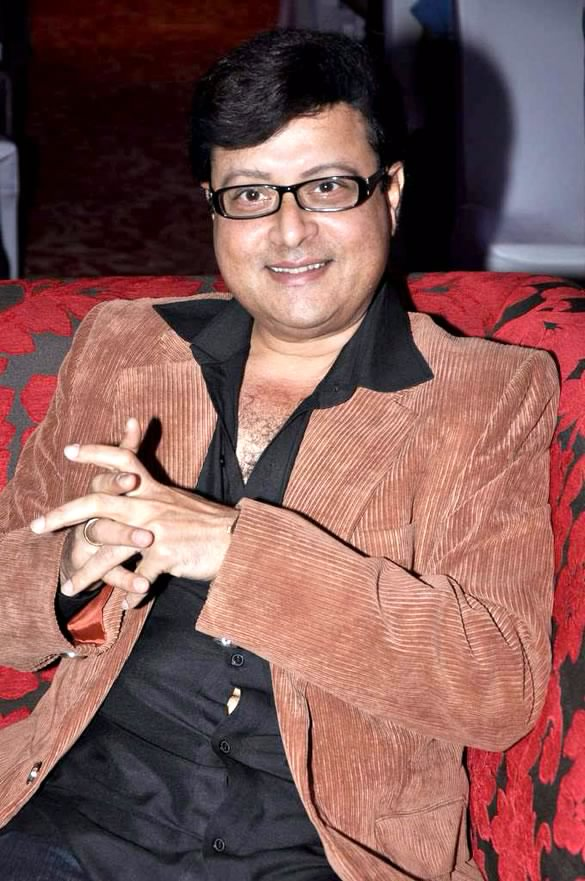
- Pilgaonkar in 2018
- Born: 17 August 1957 (age 69); Bombay, Bombay State, India
- Occupations: Actor; director; producer; dancer; writer; singer
- Years active: 1962–present
- Spouse: Supriya Pilgaonkar (m. 1985)
- Children: Shriya Pilgaonkar

Sachin Pilgaonkar (born 17 August 1957), often known mononymously by his screen name Sachin, is an Indian actor, director, producer, writer and singer who works primarily in Marathi and Hindi films. His career spans more than six decades, during which he has also worked in Gujarati, Kannada and Bhojpuri cinema and in Indian television. He has received several honours, including two National Film Awards, six Maharashtra State Film Awards and two Filmfare Awards Marathi.

Born in Bombay into a family of Goan origin, Pilgaonkar entered films as a child artist at the age of four in the Marathi film Ha Maza Marg Ekla (1962), for which he won the National Film Award for Best Child Artist. He went on to appear in around 65 films as a child actor, including Majhli Didi (1967), Brahmachari (1968) and Jewel Thief (1967), and won a second National Film Award for Best Child Artist for Ajab Tujhe Sarkar (1971). Transitioning to adult roles, he became a popular leading man in Hindi cinema with films such as Geet Gaata Chal (1975), Balika Badhu (1976), Ankhiyon Ke Jharokhon Se (1978) and Nadiya Ke Paar (1982), while also taking supporting parts in major productions including Sholay (1975), Trishul (1978) and Satte Pe Satta (1982). In Marathi cinema, he starred in the superhit devotional drama Ashtavinayak (1979).

From the 1980s, Pilgaonkar established himself as a director in Marathi films. He made his directorial debut with the critically praised Mai Baap (1982) and achieved commercial success with Navri Mile Navryala (1984), which also starred his future wife Supriya Pilgaonkar. Along with Ashok Saraf, Laxmikant Berde and Mahesh Kothare, he is credited with shaping the comedy wave of Marathi cinema through hits such as Gammat Jammat (1987), Ashi Hi Banwa Banwi (1988), Bhutacha Bhau (1989) and Aamchyasarkhe Aamhich (1990). He later directed, produced and starred in the road comedy Navra Maza Navsacha (2004), which became a cult classic, and its sequel Navra Maza Navsacha 2 (2024), one of the highest-grossing Marathi films of that year. In 2015, he received wide acclaim for his supporting role in the musical drama Katyar Kaljat Ghusali.

On television, Pilgaonkar directed and appeared in comedy shows including the sitcom Tu Tu Main Main, and later hosted the dance reality show Eka Peksha Ek and judged several other reality programmes. In 2010, he received the V. Shantaram Special Contribution Award, and in 2017, marking 50 years in the film industry, he published his autobiography, "Hach Maza Marg".

== Early life and career ==
=== Child artist (1961–1974) ===
Sachin Pilgaonkar was born on 17 August 1957 in Bombay (now Mumbai), Maharashtra, into a middle-class family of Goan origin with ancestral roots in the village of Pilgaon. His family originally bore the surname Rajadhyaksha before adopting the surname Pilgaonkar after settling in Mumbai. His father, Sharad Pilgaonkar, ran a printing business in the city and later worked as a film producer, while his mother, Sushila Pilgaonkar, was a homemaker.

Pilgaonkar entered the film industry at the age of four. Following a recommendation from actor Suryakant, his father took him to Kolhapur to audition for films. At the age of four, he was initially selected for Madhavrao Shinde's Marathi film Soonbai (1961), but did not ultimately appear in the film. He made his acting debut in Raja Paranjpe's Marathi film Ha Maza Marg Ekla (1962), alongside Seema Deo, Jeevankala and Reema Lagoo. His performance won him the National Film Award for Best Child Artist, which was presented by the then President of India, Sarvepalli Radhakrishnan. Pilgaonkar has recalled that Prime Minister Jawaharlal Nehru also felicitated him at the ceremony, a moment he has described as deeply emotional. He received the award for a second time at the 19th National Film Awards or his performance in the Marathi film Ajab Tuje Sarkar (1971).

As a child actor, Pilgaonkar appeared in approximately 65 Marathi and Hindi films. Although he had appeared in Hindi films earlier, his first major recognition in Hindi cinema came with Hrishikesh Mukherjee's Majhli Didi (1967), which starred Dharmendra and Meena Kumari, and subsequently featured in films such as Jewel Thief (1967), Brahmachari (1968), Chanda Aur Bijli (1969) and Mela (1971). During this period he frequently worked with the child actor Naeem Sayyed, better known as Junior Mehmood, with whom he first appeared in Brahmachari and shared the screen in about fifteen films. In 1971, Pilgaonkar received the National Film Award for Best Child Artist for a second time, at the 19th National Film Awards, for his performance in the Marathi film Ajab Tuje Sarkar, for which he also won the Maharashtra State Film Award for Best Actor.

Pilgaonkar later credited several of his early collaborators with shaping his craft. He learned Urdu pronunciation from Meena Kumari while working on Majhli Didi, took guidance in acting from Sanjeev Kumar, and learned film editing from Hrishikesh Mukherjee. He continued to work steadily as a child and juvenile artist through the early 1970s, appearing in films such as Bachpan (1970) Dastaan (1972) and Resham Ki Dori (1974), in which he was frequently billed as "Master Sachin".

=== Transition to lead roles (1975–1982) ===
As he grew into his teens, he began to be considered for adult parts, and by the middle of the decade he had transitioned from child roles to leading and supporting characters in Hindi cinema.

The turning point came in 1975, when Pilgaonkar appeared in two contrasting releases. He played Ahmed, the son of a blind imam (portrayed by A. K. Hangal), in Ramesh Sippy's Sholay, one of the highest-grossing films in Indian cinema history, in which his character's death becomes a catalyst for the film's climax. The same year, he was cast in the lead role of Shyam in Rajshri Productions' musical romance Geet Gaata Chal, directed by Hiren Nag and co-starring Sarika. The film's unexpected commercial success established Pilgaonkar as a leading man and turned him and Sarika into a popular on-screen pair. Following Geet Gaata Chal, Pilgaonkar featured in a series of bittersweet, family-oriented dramas that defined the most successful phase of his Hindi film career. He played the young husband in Tarun Majumdar's Balika Badhu (1976), opposite Rajni Sharma, a period drama set in rural Bengal whose R. D. Burman soundtrack became widely popular. His performance as Arun in the romantic drama Ankhiyon Ke Jharokhon Se (1978), opposite Ranjeeta Kaur, was a major success and is regarded as one of his signature films.

In 1977, Pilgaonkar made his transition to adult roles in Marathi cinema with Paradh, followed by Ashtavinayak (1979), directed by Rajdutt and produced by his father under the Manorama Films banner, in which he played an atheist industrialist who undergoes a profound spiritual transformation; the latter proved the more successful of the two and won him the Filmfare Award Marathi for Best Actor, while the film also earned him nomination at Maharashtra State Film Awards.

Despite the success of his Rajshri-backed romances, Pilgaonkar was unable to establish himself as a mainstream top-billed Hindi film star. He was largely confined to a particular type of gentle, small-budget family drama, and struggled to break into the big-banner action and masala films that dominated the box office in the period. As a result, from the late 1970s he increasingly took on supporting roles in larger productions, appearing in films such as Trishul (1978), Judaai (1980) and Satte Pe Satta (1982). His run of Rajshri leads nonetheless culminated in another hit with Nadiya Ke Paar (1982), which remained among his most popular Hindi films.

=== Move to Marathi cinema and direction (1982–1992) ===
By the early 1980s, with opportunities as a Hindi leading man narrowing, Pilgaonkar began to redirect his career toward Marathi cinema and film direction, making his directorial debut with Mai Baap (1982), a family drama that received critical appreciation but limited commercial success. His first hit as a director came with the comedy Navri Mile Navryala (1984), which he also acted in and which featured Supriya Sabnis (later Supriya Pilgaonkar); the film was a major box-office success and marked the beginning of his long professional and personal association with her. He followed it with Gammat Jammat (1987), which marked the film debut of actress Varsha Usgaonkar, was among the year's biggest Marathi box-office successes, and won him the Maharashtra State Film Award for Best Director II, further establishing his standing as a maker of popular Marathi comedies.

Alongside directing, Pilgaonkar continued to take supporting roles in Hindi films through the 1980s, including Avtaar (1983), Ghar Dwaar (1985) and Aaj Ka Daur (1985). During this period he became part of a quartet with Ashok Saraf, Laxmikant Berde and Mahesh Kothare, a grouping frequently credited with driving the "comedy wave" that dominated Marathi cinema through the late 1980s and early 1990s.

He reached a major milestone in his directing career with the 1988 ensemble comedy Ashi Hi Banwa Banwi, a farce adapted from Hrishikesh Mukherjee's 1966 Hindi film Biwi Aur Makan, about a group of friends who, to satisfy a landlady who rents only to married couples, disguise two of their number as women. Pilgaonkar himself played one of the cross-dressing roles, Sudhir/Sudha, opposite Berde as Parshuram/Parvati, with Saraf as Dhananjay Mane. The film reportedly earned a record ₹3 crore (equivalent to ₹37 crore or US$3.9 million in 2026) at the box office, becoming the first Marathi film to cross ₹1 crore and the highest-grossing Marathi film of its time, and is regarded as a cult classic, cementing Pilgaonkar's reputation as a commercial hitmaker; it also won him the Maharashtra State Film Award for Best Director I. He consolidated this success with Maza Pati Karodpati (1988) and continued to direct and star in a string of films at the turn of the decade, including Bhutacha Bhau (1989), Atmavishwas (1989), Eka Peksha Ek (1990) and the comedy Aamchyasarkhe Aamhich (1990). Both Atmavishwas and Eka Peksha Ek won him the Maharashtra State Film Award for Best Director II. He also directed occasional Hindi films, beginning with Prem Deewane (1992), though these were less successful than his Marathi work.

=== Television and reality shows (1994–2013) ===
In the 1990s, Pilgaonkar shifted much of his attention to Indian television. He created and directed the Hindi comedy series Tu Tu Main Main (1994–2000), built around the relationship between a mother-in-law and daughter-in-law and starring Supriya Pilgaonkar and Reema Lagoo; the show became a popular success. He went on to direct and produce further shows, including the film-parody programme Rin 1 2 3 on DD Metro and the sitcom Hadh Kar Di starring Dara Singh, the latter of which was pulled off air after an initially favourable reception. He also anchored the musical show Chalti Ka Naam Antakshari on Star Plus and hosted various award ceremonies and events.

In 2009, he launched the Marathi dance talent show Eka Peksha Ek on Zee Marathi, and in 2009 he appeared as a judge on the comedy talent show Chhote Miyan on Colors TV.

In 2004 Pilgaonkar wrote, directed, produced and starred in the road comedy Navra Maza Navsacha, opposite Supriya Pilgaonkar and Ashok Saraf, about a couple's pilgrimage from Mumbai to Ganpatipule to fulfil a vow. Loosely based on the 1972 Hindi film Bombay to Goa, it became a commercial success and is regarded as one of his cult films. In 2007 he made his Kannada cinema debut directing Ekadantha, a remake of Navra Maza Navsacha starring Vishnuvardhan. He continued to direct and act in Marathi films including Amhi Satpute (2008), a remake of Satte Pe Satta and Ideachi Kalpana (2010).

Pilgaonkar returned to the big screen in later years, largely in character parts. In 2011 he directed and co-starred in Jaana Pehchana, a delayed follow-up to Ankhiyon Ke Jharokhon Se, which failed to replicate the original's success. Reviewing the film for Rediff, Preeti Arora wrote that "Sachin who is also the director hasn't been able to manage both roles effectively." He directed and acted alongside his daughter, actress Shriya Pilgaonkar, in the Marathi film Ekulti Ek (2013), which marked her big-screen debut.

=== Later work (2015–present) ===
One of his most acclaimed later performances came in Katyar Kaljat Ghusali (2015), the directorial debut of actor Subodh Bhave. He played the classical singer Khansaheb Aftab Hussain, a role performed largely in Urdu, a language he had learned decades earlier from Meena Kumari, opposite Bhave and Amruta Khanvilkar. The film was a major commercial success, reportedly grossing around ₹40 crore to become one of the highest-grossing Marathi films of its time. Pilgaonkar's performance won him his second Filmfare Award Marathi for Best Actor. In Hindi cinema he took supporting roles in films such as Qaidi Band (2017) and Hichki (2018).

From 2019, Pilgaonkar took on streaming work, playing the Maharashtra Chief Minister Jagdish Gurav in Nagesh Kukunoor's political thriller web series City of Dreams, a role he reprised across the show's three seasons (2019–2023) and for which his performance was well received. In her review for Scroll.in, Deepa Gahlot praised Pilgaonkar's performance, writing that he "brings out the contradictions of his character, hiding deviousness under an ever-smiling visage." In 2024 he produced and directed Navra Maza Navsacha 2, a sequel to his 2004 film, featuring Swapnil Joshi, Hemal Ingle, Supriya Pilgaonkar, Saraf and himself. The film earned around ₹25 crore, emerging as the second highest-grossing Marathi film of 2024.

== Other works ==
In 2017, Pilgaonkar wrote his autobiography on the completion of 50 years in the film industry, titled "Hach Maza Marg". For Govind Nihalani's Marathi directorial Ti Ani Itar (2017), he wrote a ghazal titled "Badal jo ghir ke aaye" under the pseudonym Shafaq. In addition to acting and direction, Pilgaonkar has worked as a playback singer. In 2018, he starred in the song Amchi Mumbai Changali Mumbai, which was widely panned by his fans.

== Personal life ==
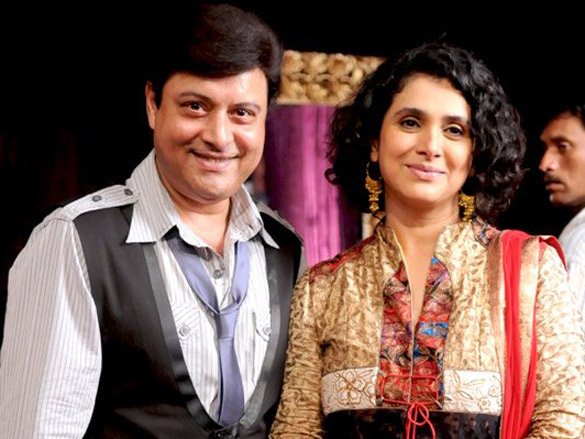
Sachin with wife Supriya Pilgaonkar in 2010

Pilgaonkar was in a relationship with actress Sarika, whom he had met during the making of Geet Gaata Chal (1975). The two were among the popular on-screen pairs of the period and appeared together in several films; according to Marathi press reports, the relationship ended around 1978.

He met the actress Supriya Sabnis while directing her debut film, the Marathi comedy Navri Mile Navryala (1984). The two married in 1985. His wife, Supriya Pilgaonkar, went on to become a well-known actress in Marathi cinema and Hindi television, and the couple frequently collaborated professionally, most notably on the sitcom Tu Tu Main Main (1994–2000), which he directed and in which she starred. In 2005, the pair took part in and won the first season of the celebrity dance reality show Nach Baliye. The couple have a daughter, Shriya Pilgaonkar (born 1989), who is also an actress and made her screen debut in Pilgaonkar's Marathi film Ekulti Ek (2013), which he wrote, directed and produced.

In the late 1980s, before the birth of their daughter, Pilgaonkar and his wife took in and raised Karishma Makhani (also known as Baby Karishma), the young daughter of a family friend; Pilgaonkar has described her as an adopted daughter in his autobiography. Karishma appeared as a child actress in the film Atmavishwas and lived with the couple intermittently before eventually settling abroad. In later years she publicly alleged that the couple had "used" her, including during their appearance on the reality show Nach Baliye; the Pilgaonkars disputed the allegations, and Karishma herself rejected related media reports that she had been "kidnapped" by her biological father.

== Filmography ==
=== Films ===
Key
| † | Denotes films that have not yet been released |

| Year | Film | Actor | Director | Role | Language | Notes | Ref. |
|---|---|---|---|---|---|---|---|
| 1962 | Haa Mazha Marg Eklaa | Yes | No | | Marathi | Child artist | |
| 1963 | Pahu Re Kiti Vaat | Yes | No | | Marathi | Child artist | |
| 1963 | Chhota Jawan | Yes | No | | Marathi | Child artist | |
| 1963 | Baiko Maheri Jaate | Yes | No | | Marathi | Child artist | |
| 1966 | Zimbo Ka Beta | Yes | No | Mala | Hindi | Child artist | |
| 1965 | Dak Ghar | Yes | No | Amal | Hindi | Child artist | |
| 1967 | Majhli Didi | Yes | No | Kishan | Hindi | Child artist | |
| 1967 | Jewel Thief | Yes | No | Shishu Singh | Hindi | Child artist | |
| 1968 | Raste Aur Manzil | Yes | No | | Hindi | Child artist | |
| 1968 | Dil Aur Mohabbat | Yes | No | Young Rajesh Chaudhary | Hindi | Child artist | |
| 1968 | Brahmachari | Yes | No | Ujala | Hindi | Child artist | |
| 1968 | Duniya | Yes | No | Young Amarnath R. Sharma | Hindi | Child artist | |
| 1968 | Annapurna | Yes | No | | Marathi | Child artist | |
| 1969 | Chanda Aur Bijli | Yes | No | Chanda | Hindi | Child artist | |
| 1969 | Waris | Yes | No | Young Ram Kumar | Hindi | Child artist | |
| 1970 | Prem Pujari | Yes | No | Sunder | Hindi | Child artist | |
| 1970 | Himmat | Yes | No | Young Raghu | Hindi | Child artist | |
| 1970 | Night in Calcutta | Yes | No | | Hindi | Child artist | |
| 1970 | Safar | Yes | No | Son of dead patient | Hindi | Child artist | |
| 1970 | Bachpan | Yes | No | Ram Lal | Hindi | Child artist | |
| 1971 | Jaane-Anjaane | Yes | No | Young Ramu | Hindi | Child artist | |
| 1971 | Mela | Yes | No | Young Shakti Singh | Hindi | Child artist | |
| 1971 | Shri Krishna Leela | Yes | No | Lord Krishna | Hindi | Child artist | |
| 1971 | Gambler | Yes | No | Georgie | Hindi | Child artist | |
| 1971 | Ajab Tujhe Sarkar | Yes | No | Uddhav | Marathi | Child artist | |
| 1972 | Dastaan | Yes | No | Young Sunil / Anil | Hindi | Child artist | |
| 1973 | Birbal My Brother | Yes | No | | English | Child artist | |
| 1974 | Nirmaan | Yes | No | | Hindi | Child artist | |
| 1974 | Resham Ki Dori | Yes | No | Young Ajit | Hindi | Child artist | |
| 1975 | Sholay | Yes | No | Ahmed | Hindi | | |
| 1975 | Geet Gaata Chal | Yes | No | Shyam | Hindi | Adult debut | |
| 1976 | Zid | Yes | No | | Hindi | | |
| 1976 | Rakshaa Bandhan | Yes | No | | Hindi | | |
| 1976 | Balika Badhu | Yes | No | Amal | Hindi | | |
| 1976 | Bairaag | Yes | No | Young Bholenath / Sanjay | Hindi | | |
| 1976 | Arjun Pandit | Yes | No | Young Vinod Shukla | Hindi | | |
| 1977 | Paradh | Yes | No | Sunil | Marathi | Released in Hindi as Anjaam | |
| 1977 | Shree Krishna Sharnam Mam | Yes | No | | Gujarati | | |
| 1977 | Shyam Tere Kitne Naam | Yes | No | | Hindi | | |
| 1977 | Shirdi Ke Sai Baba | Yes | No | Sarju | Hindi | | |
| 1977 | Pratima Aur Payal | Yes | No | | Hindi | | |
| 1978 | Trishul | Yes | No | Ravi | Hindi | | |
| 1978 | College Girl | Yes | No | Sachin | Hindi | | |
| 1978 | Ankhiyon Ke Jharokhon Se | Yes | No | Arun Prakash Mathur | Hindi | | |
| 1978 | Madhu Malti | Yes | No | Madhu | Hindi | | |
| 1978 | Adventures of Aladdin | Yes | No | Aladdin | Hindi | | |
| 1978 | Ankh Ka Tara | Yes | No | Makhan / Mohan | Hindi | | |
| 1979 | Ashtavinayak | Yes | No | Balasaheb Inamdar | Marathi | | |
| 1979 | Gopal Krishna | Yes | No | Krishna | Hindi | | |
| 1979 | Dil Kaa Heera | Yes | No | Kundan Sharma | Hindi | | |
| 1979 | Aur Kaun | Yes | No | Raj | Hindi | | |
| 1979 | Jaan-E-Bahaar | Yes | No | Gopal (Gopi) | Hindi | | |
| 1980 | Judaai | Yes | No | Ravikant S. Verma (Ravi) | Hindi | | |
| 1980 | Jaaye To Jaaye Kahan | Yes | No | | Hindi | | |
| 1981 | Sweety | Yes | No | | Hindi | | |
| 1981 | Krodhi | Yes | No | Raja | Hindi | | |
| 1982 | Satte Pe Satta | Yes | No | Shani (Sunny) Anand | Hindi | | |
| 1982 | Maut Ka Saya | Yes | No | | Hindi | Unreleased | |
| 1982 | Nadiya Ke Paar | Yes | No | Chandan Tiwari | Hindi | | |
| 1982 | Mai Baap | Yes | Yes | Chandrashekar (Chandu) Patil | Marathi | | |
| 1983 | Avtaar | Yes | No | Sewak | Hindi | | |
| 1983 | Hamar Bhauji | Yes | No | | Bhojpuri | | |
| 1984 | Yeh Desh | Yes | No | Shashi | Hindi | | |
| 1984 | Mohabbat Ka Masihaa | Yes | No | | Hindi | Delayed | |
| 1984 | Navri Mile Navryala | Yes | Yes | Jairam | Marathi | | |
| 1984 | Savvasher | No | Yes | | Marathi | | |
| 1984 | Dilavar | Yes | No | Gaurav | Hindi | | |
| 1984 | Grahasthi | Yes | No | Babloo | Hindi | | |
| 1985 | Ghar Dwaar | Yes | No | an Orphan | Hindi | | |
| 1985 | Piya Milan | Yes | No | | Hindi | | |
| 1985 | Sur Sangam | Yes | No | Kanneshwar (Kannu) | Hindi | | |
| 1985 | Aurat Pair Ki Juti Nahin Hai | Yes | No | Rakesh | Hindi | | |
| 1985 | Sanjhi | Yes | No | Chand | Hindi | | |
| 1985 | Aaj Ka Daur | Yes | No | Pratap Kapoor | Hindi | | |
| 1985 | Ram Tere Kitne Nam | Yes | No | Gopi / Chandan | Hindi | | |
| 1985 | Tulsi | Yes | No | Gopal Singh | Hindi | Also playback singer | |
| 1986 | Anaar | Yes | No | | Hindi | | |
| 1986 | Maa Beti | Yes | No | Khetan | Hindi | | |
| 1986 | Jeeva | Yes | No | Gopal Singh | Hindi | | |
| 1986 | Durgaa Maa | Yes | No | Shankar | Hindi | | |
| 1987 | Gammat Jammat | Yes | Yes | Gautam | Marathi | Also playback singer | |
| 1987 | Tera Karam Mera Dharam | Yes | No | Sunil | Hindi | | |
| 1987 | Maashuka | Yes | No | | Hindi | | |
| 1988 | Prem Sandesh | Yes | No | | Hindi | | |
| 1988 | Maza Pati Karodpati | Yes | Yes | Narendra Kuber | Marathi | Also writer | |
| 1988 | Pyar Ka Mandir | Yes | No | Lawyer Sanjay Kumar | Hindi | | |
| 1988 | Ashi Hi Banwa Banwi | Yes | Yes | Sudhir / Sudha | Marathi | | |
| 1988 | Saglikade Bombabomb | Yes | No | Kumar | Marathi | Guest appearance; Also writer | |
| 1988 | Shravan Kumar | Yes | No | Shravan Kumar Sharma | Hindi | Delayed | |
| 1988 | Paraya Ghar | Yes | No | Vinod | Hindi | | |
| 1988 | Ghar Ek Mandir | Yes | No | Sanjay Kumar | Hindi | | |
| 1989 | Abhi To Main Jawan Hoon | Yes | No | Amar | Hindi | | |
| 1989 | Atmavishwas | Yes | Yes | Rajendra Ratnaparkhi alias Raju | Marathi | Also playback singer | |
| 1989 | Bhutacha Bhau | Yes | Yes | Nandu (Nandkumar) | Marathi | | |
| 1990 | Ghanchakkar | Yes | No | | Marathi | | |
| 1990 | Aamchya Sarkhe Aamhich | Yes | Yes | Kailash / Abhay Inamdar | Marathi | | |
| 1990 | Eka Peksha Ek | Yes | Yes | Bhanudas (Bhanu) Mahimkar | Marathi | | |
| 1990 | Ek Aur Suhagan | Yes | No | | Marathi | | |
| 1991 | Aayatya Gharat Gharoba | Yes | Yes | Kedar Kirtikar | Marathi | Also producer | |
| 1991 | Anar | Yes | No | | Hindi | | |
| 1992 | Prem Deewane | Yes | Yes | | Hindi | Guest appearance; Also playback singer | |
| 1994 | Kunku | Yes | No | Shyam / Raju | Marathi | Also writer and producer | |
| 1995 | Aazmayish | No | Yes | | Hindi | Guest appearance | |
| 1996 | Maya Mamta | Yes | No | Vishwas | Marathi | | |
| 1996 | Aisi Bhi Kya Jaldi Hai | Yes | Yes | Sanjay Malhotra | Hindi | Also producer, editor and playback singer | |
| 1998 | Saazish | Yes | No | | Hindi | | |
| 2004 | Navra Maza Navsacha | Yes | Yes | Vakratund alias Vacky | Marathi | Also producer | |
| 2007 | Ram Gopal Varma Ki Aag | Yes | No | Ambar | Hindi | Guest appearance | |
| 2007 | Ekadantha | No | Yes | | Kannada | Also writer and playback singer | |
| 2008 | Amhi Satpute | Yes | Yes | Mukunda Satpute alias Kaandya | Marathi | Also producer | |
| 2008 | Man Pakharu Pakharu | Yes | No | Sarang | Marathi | | |
| 2008 | Adla Badli | Yes | No | Vaibhav | Marathi | | |
| 2010 | Ideachi Kalpana | Yes | Yes | Gangaram Gangavane | Marathi | Also producer and music composer | |
| 2011 | Sharyat | Yes | No | Dhananjay Rao | Marathi | | |
| 2011 | Jaana Pehchana | Yes | Yes | Arun Prakash Mathur | Hindi | Also writer | |
| 2011 | Teecha Baap Tyacha Baap | Yes | No | Shashi Phaterphekar | Marathi | | |
| 2012 | Krishna Aur Kans | No | No | Vasudeva | Multilingual | Voice | |
| 2012 | Aamhi Chamakate Taare | Yes | No | judge | Marathi | Guest appearance | |
| 2013 | Ekulti Ek | Yes | Yes | Arun Deshpande | Marathi | | |
| 2014 | Sanngto Aika | Yes | No | Ambatrao Gholap | Marathi | | |
| 2015 | Katyar Kaljat Ghusali | Yes | No | Khansaheb Aftab Hussain Bareliwale | Marathi | | |
| 2016 | Dand.. The Penalty | Yes | No | Inspector | Marathi | Short film | |
| 2017 | Qaidi Band | Yes | No | Dhulia | Hindi | | |
| 2018 | Hichki | Yes | No | Prabhakar Mathur | Hindi | | |
| 2018 | Ranangan | Yes | No | Shyamrao Deshmukh | Marathi | | |
| 2018 | Sohalla | Yes | No | Girish | Marathi | | |
| 2019 | Ashi Hi Aashiqui | Yes | Yes | Drunkard in a song | Marathi | Also writer and music composer | |
| 2019 | Love You Zindagi | Yes | No | Anirudh Date | Marathi | | |
| 2019 | Smile Please | No | No | | Marathi | Playback singer | |
| 2023 | Sataracha Salman | No | No | | Marathi | Playback singer | |
| 2024 | Navra Maza Navsacha 2 | Yes | Yes | Vakratund "Vacky" Deshpande | Marathi | Also producer | |
| 2026 | Kapuskonda | Yes | No | Hamid | Marathi | | |

=== Television ===
| Year | Title | Actor | Director | Role | Notes | Ref. |
|---|---|---|---|---|---|---|
| 1985 | Kahaan Gaye Woh Log | Yes | No | | | |
| 1989–1990 | Mirza Ghalib: The Playful Muse | Yes | No | | | |
| 1994–2000 | Tu Tu Main Main | No | Yes | | Also producer and playback singer | |
| 1998 | Rin 1 2 3 | Yes | No | Host | | |
| 1998–1999 | Hudd Kar Di | No | Yes | | | |
| 1999 | Chalti Ka Naam Antakshari | Yes | No | Anchor | | |
| 1999–2000 | Nehle Pe Dehla | Yes | No | | | |
| 2000 | Pratishodh | No | Yes | | Also producer | |
| 2000 | Meethi Meethi Baatein | Yes | No | | | |
| 2000 | Picnic Antakshari | Yes | No | Himself | | |
| 2003 | Gilli Danda | No | Yes | | | |
| 2005 | Khelo Gaao Jeeto | Yes | No | Himself | | |
| 2005 | Nach Baliye | Yes | No | Contestant | Winner | |
| 2006 | Tu Tota Main Maina | Yes | No | Tota | | |
| 2006–2007 | Kadvee Khattee Meethi | No | Yes | | Also playback singer | |
| 2006 | Vaidehi | No | Yes | | | |
| 2007 | Eka Peksha Ek | Yes | No | Judge | Also producer | |
| 2012 | Savdhaan India: Crime Alert | Yes | No | Host | Season 1 | |
| 2012 | Chhote Miyan | Yes | No | Judge | | |
| 2014 | Supriya Sachin Show – Jodi Tujhe Majhi | Yes | No | Host | | |
| 2016 | Sex Chat with Pappu & Papa | Yes | No | Vishwanath Watsa | | |
| 2019 | City of Dreams | Yes | No | Jagdish Gaurav | | |
| 2023 | Permanent Roommates | Yes | No | Venkat | | |

=== Singer ===
- Chal Sarja

== Accolades ==
| Awards | Year | Category | Work | Result |
|---|---|---|---|---|
| Bhendi Bazaar Urdu Festival | 2024 | Mohsin-e-Urdu Award | —N/a | Honored |
| Filmfare Awards Marathi | 1979 | Best Actor | Ashtavinayak | Won |
| Filmfare Awards Marathi | 2015 | Best Actor | Katyar Kaljat Ghusali | Won |
| Indian Telly Streaming Awards | 2021 | Best Actor in a Negative Role | City of Dreams | Nominated |
| National Film Awards | 1962 | Best Child Artist | Haa Mazha Marg Eklaa | Won |
| National Film Awards | 1972 | Best Child Artist | Ajab Tujhe Sarkar | Won |
| Maharashtra State Film Awards | 1963 | Best Child Artist | Haa Mazha Marg Eklaa | Won |
| Maharashtra State Film Awards | 1971 | Best Actor | Ajab Tujhe Sarkar | Won |
| Maharashtra State Film Awards | 1979 | Best Actor | Ashtavinayak | Nominated |
| Maharashtra State Film Awards | 1987 | Best Director II | Gammat Jammat | Won |
| Maharashtra State Film Awards | 1988 | Best Director I | Ashi Hi Banwa Banwi | Won |
| Maharashtra State Film Awards | 1989 | Best Director II | Atmavishwas | Won |
| Maharashtra State Film Awards | 1990 | Best Director II | Eka Peksha Ek | Won |
| Maharashtra State Film Awards | 2010 | V. Shantaram Special Contribution Award | —N/a | Honored |
| Maharashtra State Film Awards | 2016 | Best Actor | Katyar Kaljat Ghusali | Nominated |
| Maharashtracha Favourite Kon? | 2009 | Favourite Jodi (alongside Supriya Pilgaonkar) | Aamhi Satpute | Won |
| Maharashtracha Favourite Kon? | 2009 | Favourite Jodi (alongside Ashok Saraf) | Aamhi Satpute | Nominated |
| Maharashtracha Favourite Kon? | 2009 | Favourite Style Icon | —N/a | Nominated |
| Maharashtracha Favourite Kon? | 2012 | Favourite Comedian | Teecha Baap Tyacha Baap | Nominated |
| Maharashtracha Favourite Kon? | 2013 | Favourite Director | Ekulti Ek | Nominated |
| Maharashtracha Favourite Kon? | 2013 | Favourite Actor | Ekulti Ek | Nominated |
| Maharashtracha Favourite Kon? | 2013 | Favourite Singer – Male | Ekulti Ek | Nominated |
| Maharashtracha Favourite Kon? | 2016 | Favourite Villain | Katyar Kaljat Ghusali | Won |
| Maharashtracha Favourite Kon? | 2021 | Favourite Villain | Katyar Kaljat Ghusali | Nominated |
| Master Deenanath Mangeshkar Smruti Pratishthan | 2025 | Master Deenanath Mangeshkar Award | Contributions to Indian Cinema | Honored |
| Sanskruti Kala Darpan Awards | 2016 | Manacha Mujra Award | Katyar Kaljat Ghusali | Won |
| Zee Chitra Gaurav Puraskar | 2016 | Special Jury Award Best Actor | Katyar Kaljat Ghusali | Won |
| Zee Chitra Gaurav Puraskar | 2022 | Best Villain | Katyar Kaljat Ghusali | Won |
| Zee Marathi Utsav Natyancha Awards | 2008 | Best Judge | Eka Peksha Ek | Won |
| Zee Marathi Utsav Natyancha Awards | 2012 | Best Judge | Eka Peksha Ek | Won |
