= Aamhi Satpute =

2008 Indian film

- Theatrical release poster
- Directed by: Sachin Pilgaonkar
- Written by: Sachin Pilgaonkar; Hemant Edlabadkar
- Based on: Seven Brides for Seven Brothers (1954) by: Stanley Donen (director); Albert Hackett, Frances Goodrich, and Dorothy Kingsley (writers)
- Produced by: Sachin Pilgaonkar
- Starring: Sachin Pilgaonkar; Supriya Pilgaonkar; Swapnil Joshi; Amruta Sant; Ashok Saraf
- Music by: Jitendra Kulkarni
- Production company: Kittu Films
- Release date: 18 April 2008 (India)
- Running time: 135 minutes
- Country: India
- Language: Marathi

Aamhi Satpute (transl. We are seven brothers) is a 2008 Indian Marathi-language comedy drama film directed and produced by Sachin Pilgaonkar. It stars Sachin Pilgaonkar, Supriya Pilgaonkar, Swapnil Joshi, Amruta Sant and Ashok Saraf. The film was a remake of 1954 American film Seven Brides for Seven Brothers. Supriya Pilgaonkar won Maharashtracha Favourite Kon? favourite actress for her performance in the movie. Also won favourite jodi award along with sachin Pilgaonkar

== Plot ==
Mukund (Kandya), a vegetable vendor, supplied vegetables to a hotel owned by Anna and her seven daughters. Annapurna (Purna), the eldest daughter, received a proposal from Chandya, but she wasn't interested. In that moment, with Kandya present, she expressed her preference for marrying him. Purna admired Kandya for his hard work in earning his meals, unlike Chandya, who she believed had it without putting in much effort. Kandya eventually agrees to Purna's proposal after appreciating her cooking skills and her insistence on completing her tasks before leaving with him. Although Purna accepts, thinking she will be taking care of only him, she is surprised upon reaching his home to find that he has six brothers – Batatya, Tambya, Harbharya, Dodkya, Kobya, and Chinglya – all living untidy lives. Feeling manipulated, Purna accuses Kandya, who acknowledges his need for her help due to the challenges of rural living. After a heated exchange, Kandya plans to sleep outside to save face with his brothers, but Purna allows him back inside after he attempts to sleep in a tree.

The next day, Purna teaches Kandya and his brothers cleanliness and proper manners. Discovering that the brothers are unmarried and lack communication skills with women, Purna guides them to change their ways. Despite initial challenges, they learn from Milly's example. At a social gathering, the brothers meet six girls who catch their interest, leading to a brawl with suitors. Expelled from town, they pine for the women they fell in love with.

As winter arrives, Purna, upset by the brothers' actions, forces them to live in the barn while the women stay in the house. Kandya leaves for a trapping cabin, and during winter, the women soften towards marriage. In spring, Purna announces she is having Kandya's baby, leading to everyone coming together to help. After the snow melts in Echo Pass, Kandya returns, and the townspeople worry about the missing women. Realizing the couples are unwilling to part, Purna encourages the brothers to marry the women, concluding their unique journey.

== Cast ==
- Sachin Pilgaonkar as Mukunda Satpute (Kaandya)
- Supriya Pilgaonkar as Annapurna Bhosle-Satpute (Purna)
- Ashok Saraf as Annasaheb Bhosle (Annapurna's father)
- Swapnil Joshi as Chingalya Satpute (Kaandya's youngest brother)
- Amruta Sant as Chimu (Chingalya's girlfriend)
- Kedar Shirsekar as Batatya Satpute
- Bhagyashree Rane as Batatya's girlfriend
- Nayan Jadhav as Tambya Satpute
- Mrunali Mayuresh as Tambya's girlfriend
- Vrishasen Dabholkar as Harbharya Satpute
- Hemlata Bane as Harbharya's girlfriend
- Sachin Kulkarni as Dodkya Satpute
- Anita Chandrakant as Dodkya's girlfriend
- Ananda Karekar as Kobya Satpute
- Swati Deval as Kobya's girlfriend
- Ali Asgar as tea seller in the song (Cameo)
- Atul Parchure as Chandya (Annasaheb's nephew)
- Nirmiti Sawant as Doctor (Cameo)
- Anand Abhyankar as Jailor (Cameo)

== Production and Release ==
Before the release, Sachin commented that the movie was not a remake of Satte Pe Satta (1982), but instead was an adaptation of American film Seven Brides for Seven Brothers (1954). He said that Satte Pe Satta had a crime angle, while this film is a musical comedy. About the title, Sachin said, "Satpute is a common Marathi surname, and since the film has seven brothers, I thought it was an apt name for the film."

The film was released in theaters in Maharashtra on 18 April 2008.

== Soundtrack ==
The movie soundtrack has 7 songs and was released by Video Palace. Jitendra Kulkarni produced the music and lyrics were penned by Pravin Davane. Singers include Sonu Nigam, Shankar Mahadevan, Nihira Joshi, Rajendra Salunkhe, Vibhavaree Apte-Joshi, Vaishali Samant, and Sachin.
