= Aayatya Gharat Gharoba =

- Poster
- Directed by: Sachin Pilgaonkar
- Screenplay by: Vasant Sabnis; Sachin Pilgaonkar
- Story by: Sachin Pilgaonkar
- Produced by: Sachin Pilgaonkar
- Starring: Ashok Saraf; Sachin Pilgaonkar; Supriya Pilgaonkar; Laxmikant Berde; Rajeshwari Sachdev; Prashant Damle; Kishori Shahane
- Cinematography: Randev Bhaduri
- Edited by: Sachin Pilgaonkar
- Music by: Arun Paudwal
- Release date: 25 September 1991 (Maharashtra)
- Running time: 139 minutes
- Country: India
- Language: Marathi

Aayatya Gharat Gharoba (translation: Habitation In A Strange House) is a 1991 Indian Marathi-language musical comedy drama film directed and produced by Sachin Pilgaonkar. The film stars an ensemble cast of Ashok Saraf, Sachin Pilgaonkar, Supriya Pilgaonkar, Laxmikant Berde, Rajeshwari Sachdev (in her debut in Marathi cinema), Prashant Damle, and Kishori Shahane. The music was composed by Arun Paudwal. The film is loosely based on 1948 Hindi film Pugree which was remade in 1972 as Dil Daulat Duniya.

The major portion of the film was shot in Kirtikar Niwas Bungalow in Mumbai.

== Plot ==
Every year, Kedar Kirtikar and his family spend three months away from their home in London. An impoverished Gopinath "Gopu Kaka" begins residing in their home during this time while posing as the owner. Kashiram requests compensation after his snack shop was wrecked by Kedar's business. In response, Gopu Kaka provides him with a fresh stall and shelter in the house.

== Cast ==
- Ashok Saraf as Gopinath "Gopu Kaka" Sawant / Gopinath Kirtikar (fake)
- Sachin Pilgaonkar as Kedar Narhari Kirtikar / Narsu (fake)
- Supriya Pilgaonkar as Madhura Kedar Kirtikar / Sakhu (fake)
- Laxmikant Berde as Kashiram Kasture
- Rajeshwari Sachdev as Kanan Narhari Kirtikar / Kanan Kanvinde (fake)
- Prashant Damle as Ajay Vishwasrao Sarpotdar
- Kishori Shahane as Shobhana Kasture
- Viju Khote as Gopalrao Kirtikar (Kedar and Kanan's paternal uncle)
- Sudhir Joshi as Vishwasrao Sarpotdar (Ajay's father)
- Jairam Kulkarni as Sakharam (one of the servants of the Kirtikars)
- Bipin Varti as Mr. Mahalkar (the man who offers partnership to Kashiram in his restaurant)
- Suhas Bhalekar as the man to whom Gopu Kaka gives money for his granddaughter's heart surgery after riding a bicycle for 7 days
- Jaywant Wadkar in a dual role as
  - the man collecting money when Gopu Kaka rides the bicycle
  - Musician in Yash Chalun Aale Daari
- Vijay Patkar as Musician in Yash Chalun Aale Daari

== Reception ==
Sharyu Kakde of MensXP wrote "The story of the film does justice to the title. The ending of this comedy style movie makes the audience emotional." The Times of India listed the film in Ashok Saraf's special films. He won Maharashtra State Film Award for Best Actor.

== Soundtrack ==
Aayatya Gharat Gharoba

Soundtrack album by Arun Paudwal
- Released: 1991
- Genre: Feature film soundtrack
- Language: Marathi
- Label: T-Series

=== Track listing ===
Track listing
No.	Title	Singer (s)	Length
1.	"Hi Premnagari Majhi Premnagari"	Anuradha Paudwal; Suresh Wadkar
2.	"Ya Re Ya Khavaya Pizza Samosa Shevaya"	Shailendra Singh; Sachin Pilgaonkar
3.	"Aayatya Gharat Gharoba (Title Song)"	Anuradha Paudwal; Kavita Krishnamurthy; Sachin Pilgaonkar
4.	"Yash Chalun Aale Daari"	Anuradha Paudwal; Kavita Krishnamurthy; Shailendra Singh; Prashant Damle; Sachin Pilgaonkar
