= Ekulti Ek =

2013 Indian Marathi-language film

- Directed by: Sachin
- Starring: Sachin Pilgaonkar; Shriya Pilgaonkar
- Release date: 24 May 2013
- Country: India
- Language: Marathi

Ekulti Ek is a 2013 Marathi film directed and produced by Sachin. The film stars himself alongside his daughter, Shriya Pilgaonkar in the lead, and his Wife, Supriya Pilgaonkar. The Three of them play the role of a family.

== Cast ==
- Sachin Pilgaonkar as Arun Deshpande
- Shriya Pilgaonkar as Swara Deshpande
- Supriya Pilgaonkar as Nandini Deshpande
- Siddharth Menon
- Ashok Saraf as Mehta
- Kishori Shahane as Madhura
- Nirmiti Sawant
- Maadhav Deochake

== Production ==
Sachin liked his daughter's performance in the short film Freedom to Love and gave her the script of Ekulti Ek.

== Release ==
The Times of India gave the film three out of five stars and wrote that "The overall performances of actors, the script speaking of children growing in broken homes, and some very touching moments make this watchable".

== Awards ==
Year	Award	Category	Recipient(s)	Result	Ref.
2013	Maharashtra State Film Awards	Maharashtra State Government Award for Best Debut Actress	Shriya Pilgaonkar	Won	
