= Chikhalwadi =

Village in Maharashtra, India

- Village
- Location in Shirala, Maharashtra, India Chikhalwadi (India)
- Coordinates: 16.9445043°N 74.1391755°E
- Country: India
- State: Maharashtra
- District: Sangli

Languages
  - Official: Marathi
- Time zone: UTC+5:30 (IST)
- PIN: 415408
- Telephone code: 02345
- Vehicle registration: MH 10
- Nearest city: Kolhapur
- Lok Sabha constituency: Hatkanangle
- Vidhan Sabha constituency: Shirala (Vidhan Sabha constituency)

Chikhalwadi is a village under Sangli district, Maharashtra, comprising 203 hectares. In 2011 the village had 1,019 inhabitants contained in 219 households.
