= Ashok Saraf =

Indian actor (born 1947)

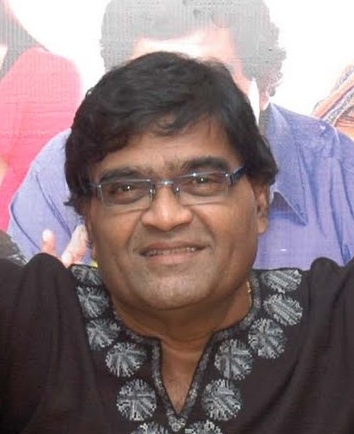
- Saraf in 2011
- Born: 4 June 1947 (age 79); Bombay, Bombay Province, British India (present day, Mumbai, Maharashtra, India)
- Other names: Mahanayak; Ashok Samrat; Mama
- Occupation: Actor
- Years active: 1969–present
- Works: Full list
- Spouse: Nivedita Saraf (m. 1990)
- Children: 1
- Family: Joshi–Saraf family
- Awards: Full list
- Honours: V. Shantaram Award (2006); Sangeet Natak Akademi Award (2022); Maharashtra Bhushan (2023); Padma Shri (2025)

Signature
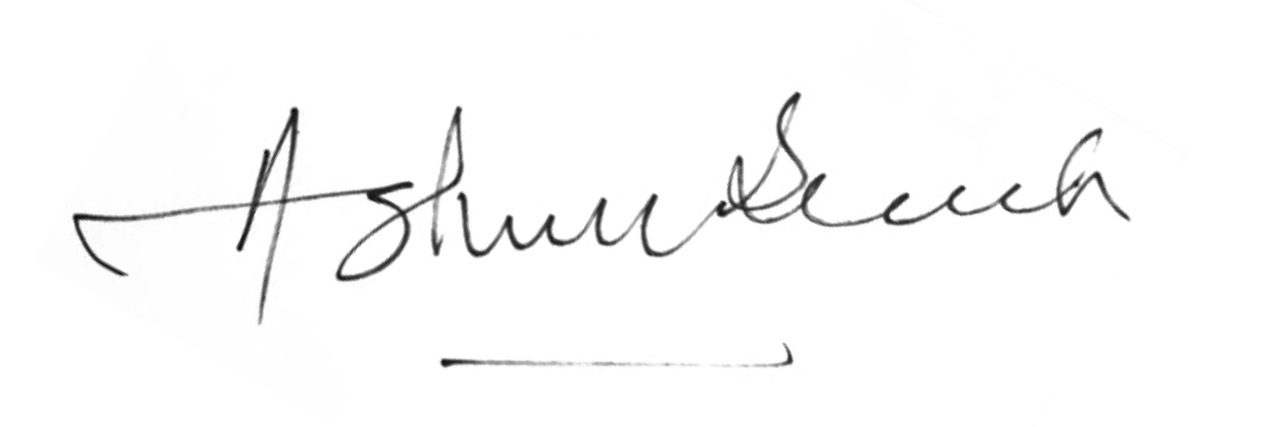

Ashok Saraf (pronounced [əʃoːk səɾaːf]; born 4 June 1947) is an Indian actor and comedian known primarily for his work in Marathi films, and for his supporting and comic roles in Hindi films, television and theatre. Over a career spanning more than five decades and more than 300 films, he is a recipient of several accolades including twelve Maharashtra State Film Awards and four Filmfare Awards Marathi. Widely regarded as one of the most versatile actors of Marathi cinema, he is referred to as the "Mahanayak", "Ashok Samrat" or "Mama" of the Marathi film industry, and is often described in the press as the "King of the Marathi Film Industry".

Saraf made his acting debut with the 1969 Marathi film Janaki and rose to prominence through the 1970s with films such as Pandu Havaldar (1975), for which he won the State Film Award for Best Supporting Actor, and Ram Ram Gangaram (1977). His commercial peak came in the 1980s and 1990s with a string of successful comedies, most notably Ek Daav Bhutacha (1982), Dhum Dhadaka (1985) and Ashi Hi Banwa Banwi (1988), the latter considered one of the most celebrated Marathi comedy films of all time. Alongside Laxmikant Berde, Sachin Pilgaonkar, and Mahesh Kothare, he is credited with driving the "comedy films wave" that shaped Marathi cinema for over a decade.

In Hindi cinema, Saraf is best known for his comic supporting roles in films such as Karan Arjun (1995), Yes Boss (1997), and Singham (2011), and in the popular 1990s television series Hum Paanch. Among his other well-known Marathi comedies are Ek Daav Dhobi Pachhad (2009), Navra Maza Navsacha (2004), and Saade Maade Teen (2007). In his later career, he has been noted for character-driven performances in films including Me Shivaji Park (2018), Prawaas (2020), for which he received a Filmfare nomination, and Ved (2022).

The Government of Maharashtra honoured him with the V. Shantaram Lifetime Achievement Award in 2006, Sangeet Natak Akademi Award in 2022, Maharashtra Bhushan in 2023 for his contributions to the arts. In 2025, the Government of India honoured him with the Padma Shri, the fourth highest civilian award.

== Early life ==
Ashok Saraf was born on 4 June 1947 in Bombay (now Mumbai), Maharashtra, into a Maharashtrian family. He spent his childhood in the Chikhalwadi area of South Mumbai and completed his schooling at DGT Vidyalaya. He was named after Hindi film actor Ashok Kumar, who was a prominent figure in Indian cinema at the time.

During his school years, Saraf developed an interest in acting and participated in cultural activities and stage performances. Before entering the entertainment industry full-time, he worked in a bank while pursuing acting opportunities through theatre. As his involvement in stage productions increased, he eventually left his job to focus on an acting career. He made his acting debut with the Marathi film Janaki in 1969. In the following years, he appeared in supporting roles in Marathi films and theatre productions, gradually establishing himself within the Marathi entertainment industry.

== Acting career ==
=== Early career and rise to prominence (1969-1979) ===
In 1969, Saraf made his film debut with the Marathi film Janaki, where he played the role of Madan. Although the film did not make him an immediate star, it marked the beginning of his acting career in Marathi cinema. In 1971, he appeared in Donhi Gharcha Pahuna, playing a small role as a sanitary inspector. In 1973, he appeared in Aalay Tufan Darayala, playing the character Ashkya. The film helped increase his visibility within the Marathi film industry. Saraf continued performing in theatre productions and supporting film roles while gradually building his reputation as a comic performer. 1975 became a breakthrough year in his career. He appeared in Pandoba Porgi Phasali, Varat and most importantly Pandu Havaldar, directed by Dada Kondke. His portrayal of Hawaldar Sakharam in Pandu Havaldar received widespread appreciation and earned him the Maharashtra State Film Award for Best Supporting Actor. The success of the film significantly increased his popularity and established him as a promising comic actor in Marathi cinema. He starred in Tumcha Aamcha Jamala as Nagojirao and Jawal Ye Laju Nako as Gaja in 1976. Both films further strengthened his presence in Marathi comedy films and helped him gain recognition among audiences. In 1977, he appeared in Navra Majha Brahmachari, Dagaa and Ram Ram Gangaram. His role as Mhamdu Khatik in Ram Ram Gangaram received particular attention and earned him a Filmfare Special Mention. By this time, Saraf had become a familiar face in the industry. He acted in Sushila, Lakshmi, Sasurvasheen and the Hindi film Damaad in 1978, marking one of his early appearances in Hindi cinema. His growing popularity in Marathi films continued throughout the year. 1979 was one of the busiest years of his early career. He appeared in several films including Duniya Kari Salaam, Gyanabachi Mekh, Ashtavinayak, Sasurvasheen, Deed Shahane, Baeelveda, Haldi Kunku, Chimanrao Gundyabhau, Paijecha Vida and the Hindi film Meri Biwi Ki Shaadi. His performance in Baeelveda earned him his first Maharashtra State Film Award for Best Actor. The large number of successful releases during the year firmly established him as one of the leading actors in Marathi.

=== Commercial peak (1980-1990) ===
In 1980, Saraf appeared in several films including Sharan Tula Bhagwanta, Saubhagyadaan, Sawaj, Hich Khari Daulat, Sulavarchi Poli, Fatakadi and Choravar Mor. These films strengthened his position as a popular comic actor. In 1981, he acted in films such as Nagin, Mosambi Narangi, Govinda Aala Re Aala, Are Sansar Sansar, Sundara Satarkar, Gondhalat Gondhal, Devghar and Patalin. His performance in Gondhalat Gondhal earned him second Best Supporting Actor at the Maharashtra State Film Award, further increasing his popularity. In 1983, he worked in several Marathi films and remained active in theatre. By the early 1980s, he had established himself as a dependable performer in both supporting and leading comic roles. He was seen in Gupchup Gupchup as Professor Dhond. In 1984, he continued working in comedy and family-oriented films including a role of Balasaheb in Navri Mile Navryala.

In 1985, a major turning point came with Mahesh Kothare's Dhum Dhadaka. The film emerged as a major commercial success and became one of the most influential Marathi comedy films of the decade. Saraf's performance received widespread appreciation and helped establish him as a leading star in Marathi cinema. Following the success of Dhum Dhadaka, Saraf continued appearing in commercially successful comedy films. His collaborations with Sachin Pilgaonkar became increasingly prominent during this period. He starred in Sachin's Gammat Jammat which became successful at the box office. His comic performances and screen chemistry with fellow actors contributed significantly to the popularity of Marathi comedy films during the decade. 1988 became one of the most important years of his career. Saraf appeared in Ashi Hi Banwa Banwi, Maza Pati Karodpati and Ek Gadi Baaki Anadi. Ashi Hi Banwa Banwi, directed by Sachin, became one of the most successful and celebrated Marathi comedy films of all time. His portrayal of Dhananjay Mane became one of the most iconic performances of his career. In 1989, saraf continued his successful run with films such as Balache Baap Brahmachari, Bhutacha Bhau, Navra Baiko, Kalat Nakalat, Ina Mina Dika, Eeja Beeja Teeja, Madhuchandrachi Ratra, Atmavishwas, Maalmasala and Pheka Pheki. During the same year, he also appeared in Hindi films such as Bade Ghar Ki Beti and Garibon Ka Daata. By the end of the 1980s, he had established himself as one of the biggest stars of Marathi, with several commercially successful films and a highly popular on-screen partnership with Laxmikant Berde.

=== Continued success and Hindi films (1991-1999) ===
In 1990 and 1991, he appeared in several Marathi films including Lapwa Chhapwi, Aamchyasarkhe Aamhich, Aayatya Gharat Gharoba, Ghanchakkar, Tuzhi Mazhi Jamli Jodi and Eka Peksha Ek. These films continued his successful association with comedy-oriented cinema. He got his fifth Maharashtra State Film Award for Best Supporting Actor for the film Aayatya Gharat Gharoba. He starred in films such as Aflatoon, Changu Mangu, Aikaav Te Navalach, and Bandalbaaz, he remained among the most sought-after actors in Marathi commercial cinema.

In 1993, Saraf appeared in Than Than Gopal, Aapli Mansa, Shubh Mangal Savdhan and several other family-comedy films. Saraf continued his successful run with films including Vazir, Sasar Maher, Aai Thor Tujhe Upkar and several family entertainers. He won two more Maharashtra State Film Award for Best Actor for Aapli Mansa and Vazir. His popularity among both urban and rural audiences remained strong. In 1995, he played roles in Sukhi Sansarachi 12 Sutre, Topi Var Topi, Jamla Ho Jamla and other Marathi productions. During this period, he also increased his work in Hindi cinema and television. In 1995, he played a role Anand Mathur in Hum Paanch, which became one of the most successful television series in 1990s. During the same year, he portrayed Munshiji in the Hindi action-drama film Karan Arjun, directed by Rakesh Roshan, sharing screen space with Shah Rukh Khan and Salman Khan in a notable comic supporting role. During the late 1990s, he expanded his presence in Hindi cinema through supporting and comic roles in films such as Koyla (1997), Judge Mujrim (1997), Gupt: The Hidden Truth (1997), Yes Boss (1997), Bandhan (1998) and Pyaar Kiya To Darna Kya (1998), working alongside several leading Bollywood actors of the period.

=== Shift to character roles (2000–2012) ===
During the early 2000s, Saraf continued his work in Hindi cinema, primarily portraying supporting and character roles. In 2000, he appeared in Beti No. 1 and Joru Ka Ghulam. The following year, he acted in films such as Aashiq (2001), Jodi No. 1 (2001), Inteqam (2001) and Ittefaq (2001). In 2002, he featured in Kuch Tum Kaho Kuch Hum Kahein and Kyaa Dil Ne Kahaa, continuing his presence in Bollywood family and comedy films.

In 2004, Saraf portrayed Lalu in Navra Maza Navsacha, directed by Sachin. The film emerged as a major commercial success and was among the highest-grossing Marathi films of the year. His performance as Lalu received widespread appreciation and remains one of his most recognised roles of the 2000s. Following the success of Navra Maza Navsacha, Saraf appeared in several Marathi films, including Aai No. 1, Sawaal Majha Premacha, Soon Ladki Sasarchi and Deva Shappath Khoten Sangen Kharan Sangnar Nahi.

The year 2007 proved to be one of the most active periods of his later career. He appeared in Sakhi, Ek Unad Divas, Saade Maade Teen, Aamhi Satpute and Ek Daav Dhobi Pachhad. Among these, Saade Maade Teen emerged as one of the highest-grossing Marathi films of the year, while Aamhi Satpute later attained cult status among audiences.

In 2009, Saraf appeared in Marathi films such as Nishani Dava Angatha, Balirajacha Rajya Yeu De and Master Eke Master. During this period, he continued portraying character roles while remaining a prominent presence in Marathi. In 2010, he starred in Aika Dajiba, Tata Birla Ani Laila and Most Wanted. He played a leading role in Shubh Mangal Savadhan, marking a collaboration with director Mahesh Kothare more than two decades after their successful partnership in Dhum Dhadaka (1985). The same year, he appeared in Ideachi Kalpana, which marked the first film to feature Saraf alongside fellow veterans Sachin and Kothare in principal roles. The film attracted attention for bringing together three of the most influential figures in Marathi commercial cinema. In 2011, he expanded his presence in Hindi cinema by appearing in Rohit Shetty's action film Singham, starring Ajay Devgn. The film emerged as a major commercial success and became one of the highest-grossing Hindi films of the year, introducing Saraf to a new generation of audiences through a supporting role.

=== Later career (2013–present) ===
In 2013, Saraf reunited with Sachin for Ekulti Ek, a family drama that marked another collaboration between the long-time colleagues. The following year, he appeared in Aandhali Koshimbir and Hututu.

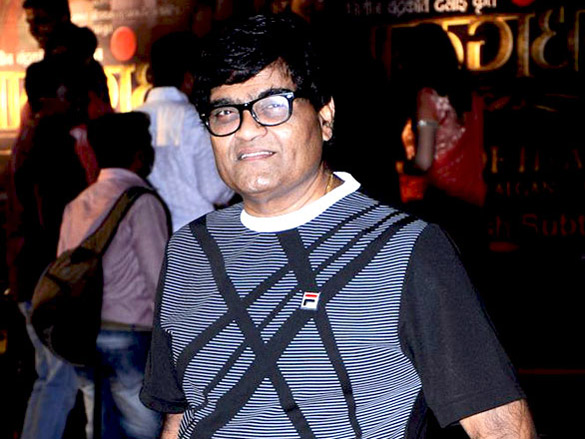
Saraf in 2019

In 2016, Saraf played a supporting role in Vrundavan, directed by T. L. V. Prasad. In 2017, he portrayed a police sub-inspector in the satirical comedy Shentimental, directed by Sameer Patil. In 2018, Saraf collaborated with filmmaker Mahesh Manjrekar for the first time in Me Shivaji Park, a drama centred on a group of elderly friends. The film received positive reviews and his performance was appreciated by critics and audiences. In 2020, he starred opposite actress Padmini Kolhapure in Prawaas, portraying a retired man embarking on a transformative journey. The film received critical acclaim and is regarded as one of the notable performances of his later career, for which he received nomination for Filmfare Critics Award for Best Actor.

In 2022, Saraf appeared in Riteish Deshmukh's directorial debut Ved, portraying his father. The film emerged as a major commercial success and became one of the highest-grossing Marathi films of all time. For his performance, he received the Fakt Marathi Cine Sanman Award for Best Supporting Actor. In 2024, he appeared in the medical drama Lifeline and reprised the role of Lalu, the ticket collector, a sequel to the 2004 film Navra Maza Navsacha. In 2025, he starred in Ashi Hi Jamva Jamvi opposite Vandana Gupte and returned to Marathi television with the series Ashok Ma.Ma, marking his comeback to the medium after several years. In 2026, he reprised his popular character Ratan in Punha Ekda Sade Made Teen, a sequel to the 2007 comedy film Saade Maade Teen.

=== Frequent collaboration ===
Throughout his career, Saraf frequently collaborated with actors, directors and filmmakers who played a significant role in the commercial success of Marathi cinema during the 1980s and 1990s. His most notable on-screen partnership was with Laxmikant Berde. The duo appeared together in numerous successful Marathi films including Dhum Dhadaka (1985), Ashi Hi Banwa Banwi (1988), Balache Baap Brahmachari (1989), Changu Mangu (1990), Aayatya Gharat Gharoba (1991) and Shubh Mangal Savdhan (1993). He also frequently collaborated with actor-director Sachin Pilgaonkar. The two worked together in films such as Mai Baap (1982), Navri Mile Navryala (1984), Savvasher (1986), Gammat Jammat (1987), Ashi Hi Banwa Banwi (1988), Maza Pati Karodpati (1988), Aamchyasarkhe Aamhich (1990), Eka Peksha Ek (1990), Aayatya Gharat Gharoba (1991), Navra Maza Navsacha (2004), Aamhi Satpute (2007), Ekulti Ek (2013) and Navra Maza Navsacha 2 (2024). Their professional association extended beyond films and was often highlighted in media discussions regarding long-standing friendships within the Marathi film industry.

He also frequently collaborated with several leading actresses of Marathi cinema. Among his earliest and most notable screen pairings was actress Ranjana. The two appeared together in multiple Marathi films during the 1970s and early 1980s and were considered one of the popular on-screen pairs of the period. Their collaborations contributed to Saraf's rise as a leading actor in Marathi commercial cinema. He also worked with several other notable actors including Dada Kondke, Nilu Phule, Vikram Gokhale, Varsha Usgaonkar, Nivedita Saraf, Kishori Shahane, Alka Kubal, Savita Prabhune, Usha Naik, Ravindra Mahajani, Sharad Talwalkar and Mahesh Kothare across multiple films and stage productions. His repeated collaborations with leading Marathi actors and filmmakers contributed significantly to his long-standing presence in Marathi cinema and theatre.

== Legacy ==
Saraf has been described in the Indian media as one of the most versatile actor. is widely referred to as the "Mahanayak", "Ashok Samrat", or "Mama" of the Marathi film industry, and has also been called the "King of the Marathi Film Industry" in the press. Alongside Laxmikant Berde, Sachin Pilgaonkar, and Mahesh Kothare, he is credited with driving the "comedy films wave" in Marathi cinema that began in mid-1980s and lasted for more than a decade. Kothare, who directed him in several of these films, has repeatedly credited Saraf's contribution to their success, while Bharat Jadhav, who later co-starred with him in Saade Maade Teen, has described Saraf as one of his own inspirations and said he learned comic timing by watching Saraf's films. Saraf's colleagues from his long-running Hindi sitcom Hum Paanch publicly credited him for shaping their careers when it marked his 75th birthday. His 75th birth anniversary was also celebrated with a special stage show organised by Zee Marathi in Mumbai. Producer Ekta Kapoor said Saraf agreed to headline the show despite being "a superstar" when she was only 17, and thanked him for the opportunity. Co-star Vidya Balan called working on the show "an incredible part of my life," while Vandana Pathak and Bhairavi Raichura both referred to Saraf as their on-screen and real-life "Bapu" (father), with Raichura recalling that her mother used to point to his performances as an example of natural acting. Riteish Deshmukh, who directed Saraf in his debut film Ved (2022), described him as one of Marathi cinema's most respected senior actors and said the experience of working with him left him with a lasting friendship. Actress Varsha Dandale, his co-star in the play Anadhikrut, recalled in a public post that Saraf visited her in Nashik after her accident despite his busy schedule, describing him as "as big a human being" as he is an actor. Actor Swapnil Joshi, congratulating him on the Maharashtra Bhushan award, wrote that the Marathi film industry would be "incomplete" without him and that the title "superstar" truly applied to him. Saraf's decades-long friendship with actor Nana Patekar, dating to their early theatre days together, has also been the subject of repeated media coverage, with both actors recalling anecdotes of mutual support from their struggling years in theatre.

Announcing the Maharashtra Bhushan award in 2023, then Chief Minister Eknath Shinde said Saraf's acting had spanned not just comedy but serious and villainous roles as well, and that he had "won over the audience" across genres. Shinde separately called him "Maharashtra's pride" at a felicitation event. Sections of the press have run retrospective profiles marking his career, including Marathi daily Loksatta's Vyaktivedh profile of him and a feature by DNA India describing him as the "comedy king" who never got a lead role in Bollywood despite his regional stardom. The Times of India and News18 have both run anniversary retrospectives on Ashi Hi Banwa Banwi (1988), describing it as an "iconic" film that continues to be watched by younger audiences decades after release.

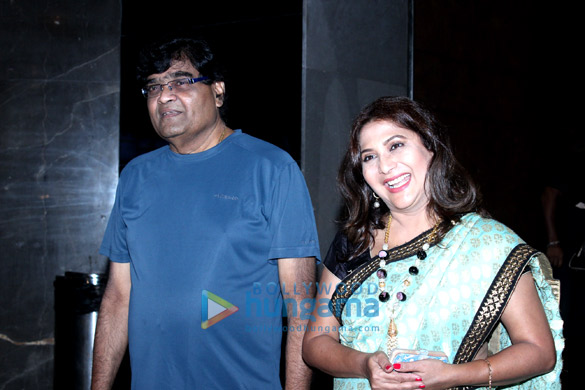
Saraf with wife Nivedita Joshi-Saraf at premiere of Marathi film Deool Band.

== Personal life ==
In the early 1980s, He was reportedly in a relationship with actress Ranjana Deshmukh. Saraf married actress Nivedita Joshi, who is about 16 years younger than him, in 1990 at the Mangueshi Temple in Goa; the temple has since been regarded by the couple as their family deity. They have a son named, Aniket Saraf, who works as a chef.

Saraf survived a major car accident in 2012 on the Mumbai Pune Expressway near Talegaon.

In 2026, Saraf made his debut appearance at the Cannes Film Festival at the age of 78, attending alongside his wife Nivedita Saraf and other representatives of the Marathi film industry as part of a delegation promoting Marathi cinema internationally. Their appearance on the red carpet in traditional Maharashtrian attire received coverage in Indian media.

== Accolades ==
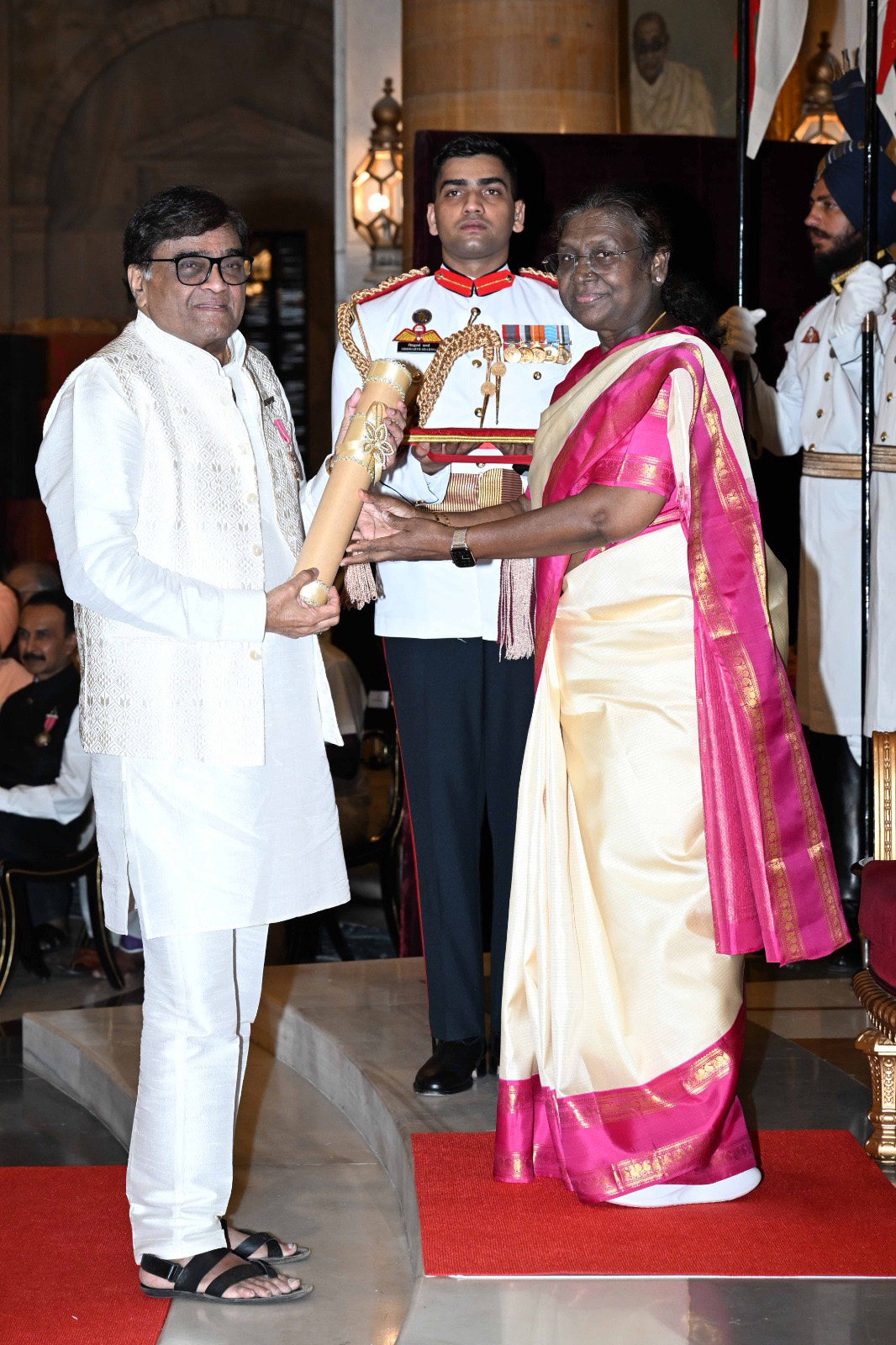
Saraf receiving Padma Shri in 2025

Year	Award	Category	Film	Result	Ref.
1975	Maharashtra State Film Awards	Best Supporting Actor	Pandu Havaldar	Won	
1979	Maharashtra State Film Awards	Best Actor	Baeelveda	Won	
1981	Maharashtra State Film Awards	Best Supporting Actor	Gondhalat Gondhal	Won	
1982	Maharashtra State Film Awards	Best Supporting Actor	Ek Daav Bhutacha	Won	
1984	Maharashtra State Film Awards	Best Actor	Bahurupi	Won	
1986	Maharashtra State Film Awards	Best Actor	Prem Karuya Khullam Khulla	Won	
1988	Maharashtra State Film Awards	Best Supporting Actor	Maza Pati Karodpati	Won	
1991	Maharashtra State Film Awards	Best Supporting Actor	Aayatya Gharat Gharoba	Won	
1992	Maharashtra State Film Awards	Best Actor	Aapli Mansa	Won	
1993	Maharashtra State Film Awards	Best Actor	Vazir	Won	
1999	Maharashtra State Film Awards	Best Comedian	Sawai Hawaldar	Won	
2000	Maharashtra State Film Awards	Best Comedian	Maherchi Pahuni	Won	
1977	Filmfare Awards Marathi	Special Mention	Ram Ram Gangaram	Won	
1982	Filmfare Awards Marathi	Best Actor	Gondhalat Gondhal	Won	
1983	Filmfare Awards Marathi	Best Actor	Goshta Dhamaal Namyachi	Won	
1996	Filmfare Awards Marathi	Best Actor	Suna Yeti Ghara	Won	
2016	Filmfare Awards Marathi	Lifetime Achievement Award	Overall Contribution	Honoured	
2017	Filmfare Awards Marathi	Best Actor	Shentimental	Nominated	
2021	Filmfare Awards Marathi	Best Actor Critics	Prawaas	Nominated	
2022	Filmfare Awards Marathi	Best Supporting Actor	Ved	Nominated	
2024	Filmfare Awards Marathi	Best Supporting Actor	Navra Maza Navsacha 2	Nominated	
1999	Screen Awards	Best Actor – Marathi	Sawai Hawaldar	Won	
2004	Zee Chitra Gaurav Puraskar	Best Actor in a Comic Role	Navra Maza Navsacha	Won	
2023	Zee Chitra Gaurav Puraskar	Lifetime Achievement Award	Overall Contribution	Honoured	
2009	Maharashtracha Favourite Kon?	Best Jodi	Aamhi Satpute (along with Sachin Pilgaonkar)	Nominated	
2010	Maharashtracha Favourite Kon?	Favourite Comedian	Ek Daav Dhobi Pachhad	Won	
2011	Maharashtracha Favourite Kon?	Favourite Comedian	Ideachi Kalpana	Nominated	
2008	Bhojpuri Film Awards	Best Supporting Actor	Mai Ka Bitua	Won	
2023	Fakt Marathi Cine Sanman	Best Supporting Actor	Ved	Won	

=== National honours and recognitions ===
- 2006 – V. Shantaram Lifetime Achievement Award by the Government of Maharashtra
- 2016 – Kala Gaurav Award by Sanskruti Kaladarpan for overall contribution
- 2020 – Pune International Film Festival Distinguished Awards for outstanding contribution to Indian cinema
- 2022 – ABP Majha Special Honour Awards
- 2022 – Fakt Marathi Cine Sanman Special Award
- 2022 – Sangeet Natak Akademi Award for his contribution in the field of performing arts
- 2023 – Maharashtra Bhushan highest civilian award given by the Maharashtra State for outstanding achievement in their field
- 2025 – Padma Shri, India's fourth highest civilian award from the Government of India for her contribution to cinema.
- 2025 – MaTa Sanman Special Award for his contribution in cinema
