= Balache Baap Brahmachari =

Balache Baap Bramhachari
- Theatrical release poster
- Directed by: Girish Ghanekar
- Written by: Vasant Sabnis
- Produced by: Kiran Shantaram
- Starring: Alka Kubal; Ashok Saraf; Laxmikant Berde; Siddharth Ray; Kishori Shahane; Nivedita Joshi; Alka Kubal; Kanchan Adhikari; Sudhir Joshi
- Cinematography: Ram Allam
- Edited by: Ashok Patwardhan
- Music by: Sharang Dev
- Production company: V. Shantaram Productions
- Release date: 24 October 1989
- Running time: 140 minutes
- Country: India
- Language: Marathi

Balache Baap Brahmachari (transl. The Fathers Of The Baby Are Bachelors) is a 1989 Indian Marathi-language comedy-drama film written by Vasant Sabnis, directed by Girish Ghanekar and produced by Kiran Shantaram under the production banner of V. Shantaram Productions. The film stars an ensemble cast of Ashok Saraf, Laxmikant Berde, Siddharth Ray, Kishori Shahane, Nivedita Joshi, Alka Kubal, Kanchan Adhikari and Sudhir Joshi. The plot is loosely inspired by Three Men and a Baby (1987) of Leonard Nimoy, which itself was based on French film Three Men and a Cradle (1985).

== Plot ==
Balache Baap Bramhachari is the story of three bachelors; Vilas Varaatkar (Ashok Saraf), Sarang Acharya (Laxmikant Berde) and Dinesh Patil (Siddharth Ray), who three are orphans and middle-class roommates. However, Vilas and Sarang are unaware that Dinesh is feigning his bachelorhood for being already married to the impoverished Kamal (Alka Kubal), who was unable to provide him with any dowry and Dinesh thus abandoned her and their newborn son at the house of Kamal's brother (Giriraj). Meanwhile, Dinesh's factory employer, Babasaheb Kirtikar (Sudhir Joshi), decides to send Dinesh for a four-month training to Hong Kong and Singapore and later arrange his marriage with his daughter, Priya (Kanchan Adhikari).

In the parallel plot, Vilas, an electronics salesman, meets Shyamala (Kishori Shahane) when she purchases a washing machine and then a TV from his store, while Sarang meets Meenakshi (Nivedita Joshi) when he delivers her books from his moving library. The meetings of both the couples soon turn into love, but Shyamala's collector father, K. C. Tavdaane (Irshad Hashmi), and Meenakshi's yoga-obsessed father, Bapusaheb Aasankar (Jairam Kulkarni), are both the real obstacles ahead. However, Vilas and Sarang work together and are guided by each other to win the hearts of Shyamala and Meenakshi's respective fathers.

While Dinesh is away for his training, Kamal's brother's arrogant wife (Roohi Berde) constantly taunts and tortures Kamal and makes her life miserable, forcing Kamal to leave the house with her son and arrive at Dinesh's town. Shortly, things take a turn when Kamal abandons her son on the doorstep of Vilas and Sarang's house in an attempt to escape from a rapist auto-rickshaw driver. Although facing a lot of difficulties due to inexperience, Vilas and Sarang bring up Kamal's son with affection and care and name him "Murphy". Soon, Kamal successfully requests Vilas and Sarang to appoint her as Murphy's governess in a bid to live with her son.

After completing his training, Dinesh arrives back in India and invites Vilas and Sarang to his and Priya's engagement ceremony, where Kamal is horrified to discover the truth of Dinesh and Priya's relationship. Furthermore, Vilas and Sarang misunderstand Kamal to be a thief when Priya accuses Kamal of stealing her and Dinesh's photograph. At this point, Kamal confesses to Vilas and Sarang that she is Murphy's biological mother and that her estranged husband is none other than their childhood friend, Dinesh. Shocked at learning this, Vilas and Sarang decide to teach Dinesh a lesson and give Kamal and Murphy their justice along with Shyamala and Meenakshi.

== Cast ==
- Ashok Saraf as Vilas Varaatkar
- Laxmikant Berde as Sarang Acharya
- Siddharth Ray as Dinesh Patil
- Kishori Shahane as Shyamala Tavdaane
- Nivedita Joshi as Meenakshi Aasankar
- Alka Kubal as Kamal Patil
- Kanchan Adhikari as Priya Kirtikar (Dinesh's fiancèe)
- Sudhir Joshi as Babasaheb Kirtikar (Dinesh's employer)
- Irshad Hashmi as Collector K. C. Tavdaane (Shyamala's father)
- Jairam Kulkarni as Bapusaheb Aasankar (Meenakshi's father)
- Sulabha Deshpande as Sakhubai (Vilas and Sarang's domestic worker)
- Suhas Bhalekar as Bhairav (Dinesh's butler)
- Kishore Nandlaskar as Deputy Collector Luktuke (Sarang's library customer)
- Mandakini Bhadbhade as Mrs. Luktuke (Luktuke's wife)
- Vidya Patwardhan as Vandana Luktuke (Luktuke's daughter)
- Giriraj as Kamal's brother
- Roohi Berde as Kamal's sister-in-law

== Soundtrack ==
Balache Baap Brahmachari

Soundtrack album by Sharang Dev
- Released: 1989
- Genre: Feature film soundtrack
- Length: 21:00
- Language: Marathi
- Label: Tips Music

The music is composed by Sharang Dev and songs as sung by Suresh Wadkar, Suhasini, Kavita Krishnamurthi and Vinay Mandke.

Track listing
No.	Title	Singer(s)	Length
1	"Bagh Saari Duniya Nijali"	Suresh Wadkar, Vinay Mandke, Ashok Saraf, Laxmikant Berde	3:05
2	"Bagh Saari Duniya Nijali" (Sad Version)	Suresh Wadkar, Vinay Mandke	3:51
3	"Balache Baap Brahmachari"	Suresh Wadkar, Vinay Mandke, Suhasini	4:53
4	"Char Teen Don Ek"	Suresh Wadkar, Vinay Mandke	5:28
5	"Preeticha Game Asa Nava"	Suresh Wadkar, Vinay Mandke, Kavita Krishnamurthi	3:48
