= Ek Daav Dhobi Pachhad =

- Directed by: Satish Rajwade
- Starring: Ashok Saraf
- Cinematography: Suresh Deshmane
- Music by: Title Song: Ajay-Atul; Background Score: Vishwajeet-Avinash
- Production companies: Zee Talkies; Shree Mangesh Films
- Distributed by: Zee Talkies
- Release date: 2 June 2009
- Running time: 128 mins
- Country: India
- Language: Marathi

Ek Daav Dhobi Pachhad is a 2009 Indian Marathi-language comedy film directed by Satish Rajwade and written by Girish Girija Joshi, from dialogues by Kiran Yadnyopavit. The movie is an uncredited remake of a 1991 movie starring Sylvester Stallone. The cinematography is handled by Suresh Deshmane and music is composed by Vishwajeet–Avinash. The film is produced by Shree Mangesh Films and Zee Talkies. The film stars Ashok Saraf in the lead role of Dadasaheb Dandage, while Mukta Barve, Kishori Shahane, Pushkar Shrotri, Bharat Ganeshpure, Prasad Oak, Madhura Velankar play supporting characters in the film.

== Plot ==
Dada Dandge (Ashok Saraf) is an infamous goon of Bhongalpur, known to have every illegal business there can be. He has two main disciples he confides in, Bhagwan (Bharat Ganeshpure) who is soft spoken and Babu (Pushkar Shrotri) who believes a gun can solve anything.

Dada finds a land designated for a school best suited for a beer bar and wants to capture it somehow. Both Bhagwan and Babu fail so he personally goes there to see why, and to his surprise he sees his long lost love Hema (Kishori Shahane Vij) and asks her to marry him. Hema declines the proposal due to cultural differences between them and insults him.

On the way back home, disheartened Dada thinks about what Hema had said and decides to change. He misunderstands what Hema had said and feels that coming out clean from illegal businesses, speaking polished Marathi and buying out an educational institute will make him win her over. He gradually starts doing that.

Police and Dada's rival, Sakha Patil (Uday Sabnis), keep an eye on Dada's house to know the reason for the sudden change of heart. Police Inspector (Sanjay Mone) misunderstands Dada to be planning some big robbery and Sakha thinks Dada is planning to enter politics. This confusion adds to a laughter riot.

On the other hand, Dada's accountant Tryambak (Prasad Oak), is in love with a girl named Sayli (Madhura Velankar) whom he thinks is Dada's daughter. Tryambak asks Dada to get him married to his daughter.

Dada has a daughter, Sulakshana (Mukta Barve) who wants to run away from the house as she wants to explore the world. She claims to be pregnant with Sakha Patil's son which infuriates Dada. So he plans to get Tryambak married to Sulakshana. They both dislike each other and finally Tryambak introduces Prof. Parkhadkar (Subodh Bhave) to her so that they can get close to each other and Trymbak can then marry his love of life.

What happens with all the love stories, who does police arrest in the end and if Hema finally forgives Dada forms the crux of rest of the movie!

== Cast ==
- Ashok Saraf as Dadasaheb Dandage
- Madhura Velankar as Sayali
- Bharat Ganeshpure as Bhagwan
- Pushkar Shrotri as Babu Padwal
- Kishori Shahane as Hema
- Mukta Barve as Sulakshana
- Subodh Bhave as Prof Parkhadkar
- Sanjay Mone as Inspector Dhande
- Sukanya Kulkarni Mrs. Dhande
- Prasad Oak as Tryambak
- Uday Sabnis as Sakha Patil
- Vinay Yedekar as Fransis Tailor
- Kamlakar Satpute as Nanya
- Sandeep Pathak as Baban detective
- Smita Tambe as housemaid Sakhu

== Music ==
Background Music of the film is given by Vishwajeet- Avinash, while the Title song has been composed and sung by Ajay–Atul. The film features two main tracks, a title track Ek Daav Dhobi Pachhad, while the other song Tujhi Majhi Jodi jamali ga is taken from the famous old movie Maza Pati Karodpati (My husband is billionaire).
