= Sudhir Joshi =

Indian actor

- Born: 1948; Dadar, Bombay, Bombay State (present-day Mumbai, India)
- Died: 14 December 2005 (aged 56–57); Mumbai, Maharashtra
- Occupation: Actor

Sudhir Joshi (1948 – 14 December 2005) was an Indian Marathi actor and comedian. Born in Dadar, Joshi attended Pinto Villa (branch of Raja Shivaji Vidyalaya) and later Kirti College to obtain his BA Economics. He also studied law at Kirti. He worked as a sales executive at the publishing company Blackie and Sons. Leaving this position in 1973, he worked in other sales related jobs for a year, then happened upon a chance to act in a play in 1974. It was to be the start of Joshi's acting career.

Due to a massive heart attack he died in Mumbai in December 2005.

== Filmography ==
=== Films ===
- Anantyatra (1985)
- Hamaal De Dhamaal (1989) - Colonel Arjun Patwardhan (Nandini's father)
- Kala Bazaar (1989)
- Balache Baap Brahmachari (1989) - Babasaheb Kirtikar (Priya's father)
- Ek Full Char Half
- Gholat Ghol
- Jamla Ho Jamla
- Gammat Jammat (1987) - Mama (Shrikant's uncle)
- Ashi Hi Banwa Banwi (1988) - Vishwas Sarpotdar (landlord)
- Rangat Sangat (1988)
- Kiss Bai Kiss (1988)
- Atmavishwas (1989) - Dr. Balasaheb Sarpotdar (Vasanti's husband)
- Bhutacha Bhau (1989)
- Gharkul Punha Hasave (1989)
- Eena Meena Deeka (1989)
- Ghanchakkar (1990)
- Tujhi Majhi Jamalli Jodi (1990)
- Lapwa Chhapwi (1990)
- Aamchya Sarkhe Aamhich (1990) - Chandrakant Inamdar (Nirbhay and Abhay's uncle)
- Aflatoon (1991)
- Aayatya Gharat Gharoba (1991) - Vishwas Sarpotdar (Ajay's father)
- Aaplee Maanse (1993)
- Paisa Paisa Paisa (1993)
- Savat Mazi Ladki (1993) - Dadasaheb Hirve (Madhu's brother)
- Sasarche Dhotar (1994)
- Vazir (1994)
- Bajrangachi Kamal (1994)
- Limited Manuski (1995)
- Hasari (1997)
- Premankur (1998)
- China Gate (1998)
- Khiladi 420 (2000)
- Pukar (2000)
- Navra Majhya Muthit Ga! (2000)
- Devki
- Tu Tithe Mee
- Ek Unaad Diwas (2004)
- Matichya Chuli (2005)
- Maine Gandhi Ko Nahin Mara (2005)

=== Plays ===
- Ghar Shrimantacha
- Sakhi Shejarini
- Paryaay
- Ekda Pahava Karun
- Hasta Hasta
- Lapandav
- Ashvamedh
- Tur Tur
- Shante Cha Karta Chalu Aahe
- Jodidar
- I Am Not Bajirao
- Zaale Ekadache

== Television ==
- Indradhanushya
- Prapanch
- Puneri Punekar
- Bhikaji Karodpati
- Gajra
- Comedy Dot Com (Zee marathi)
- Gilli Danda
- Hum Paanch (Hindi)
- Chutki Baja Ke (Hindi)
- Don't Worry Ho Jayega (Hindi)
- 405 Anandvan
- एक हा असा धागा सुखाचा
