= Ideachi Kalpana =

Ideachi Kalpana आयडियाची कल्पना
- Theatrical release poster
- Directed by: Sachin Pilgaonkar
- Written by: Kshitij Zarapkar
- Produced by: Sachin Pilgaonkar
- Starring: Sachin Pilgaonkar; Ashok Saraf; Mahesh Kothare; Bhargavi Chirmule; Nirmiti Sawant; Bhagyashree Rane
- Music by: Avdhoot Gupte; Sachin Pilgaonkar
- Release date: 31 December 2010 (Maharashtra)
- Running time: 175 minutes
- Country: India
- Language: Marathi

Ideachi Kalpana (Devanagari: आयडियाची कल्पना; translation: The Conception of an Idea) is a 2010 Indian Marathi-language comedy film directed and produced by Sachin Pilgaonkar and written by Kshitij Zarapkar. The film was released in Maharashtra on 31 December 2010 and stars an ensemble cast of Sachin Pilgaonkar (in a triple role), Ashok Saraf, Mahesh Kothare, Bhargavi Chirmule, Nirmiti Sawant, Bhagyashree Rane and Kshitij Zarapkar. The film is a remake of Hindi film Lakhon Ki Baat (1984) which was itself a remake of English film The Fortune Cookie (1966). The film marks the collaboration of three legends in Marathi cinema after almost two decades.

== Plot ==
Jairam Gangavane (Sachin Pilgaonkar) is an upcoming struggling actor whose older astrologer sister, Jaywanti (Nirmiti Sawant), believes that he is fated for royal living. Her husband, Advocate Manohar Barshinge (Ashok Saraf), is a lawyer but he is a fraud as one has to count the fingers of his own hand after a handshake with him. Manohar has not contested a single legal case in the court of law and prefers out-of-court settlements. One night, while returning home, Jairam gets hit by the Tata Grande car driven by his co-actress, Preeti (Bhargavi Chirmule). Preeti's older brother, Mahesh Thakur (Mahesh Kothare), is the Mumbai Police Commissioner and is married to Meena (Bhagyashree Rane). Preeti had taken the car of Mahesh during the time of the accident so the hit-and-run case becomes that of him. Mahesh comes to the private hospital where Jairam is recovering to solve the issue, but Manohar has decided to sue the owner of the car by then for a financial compensation of ₹50 lakh. Jairam is actually completely unhurt but Manohar convinces him to feign paralysis and remain in the hospital till the verdict of the case.

Though Mahesh and Manohar end up in a face-off in a non-existent case, Preeti decides to confess to Jairam that her brother was not involved in the case at all and falls in love with him in the process. Meanwhile, Jaywanti is disgusted to discover Jairam and Manohar's deceit and decides to move out from them both. However, Manohar leaks the news of Jairam's accident from Mahesh's car to the press and Jairam reads about it in the newspaper. He then escapes from the hospital and arrives at Mahesh's bungalow house in the middle of the night to reveal the truth about him to Preeti. Due to Meena's intervention, Jairam is unable to meet Preeti but he and Mahesh shockingly come face-to-face. Does Mahesh arrest Jairam alongside Manohar for embelling a fraud? Or does Manohar succeed in receiving ₹50 lakh rupees. Dies Mahesh accept defeat at the hands of the fraudsters? And what happens to Jairam and Preeti's love?

== Cast ==
- Sachin Pilgaonkar in a triple role as Jairam Gangavane / Himself / Gangaram Gangavane
- Ashok Saraf as Advocate Manohar Barshinge
- Mahesh Kothare as Commissioner Mahesh Thakur
- Bhargavi Chirmule as Preeti Thakur
- Nirmiti Sawant as Jaywanti Gangavane Barshinge / Basanti (fake)
- Bhagyashree Rane as Meena Thakur
- Kshitij Zarapkar as Dr. Gavande (Jairam's doctor)
- Rajesh Chitnis as Advocate Khamkar (Manohar's colleague)
- Ali Asgar as Film Director (Cameo appearance)
- Swapnil Joshi as Preeti's co-dancer in "Aamhi Nahi Jaa" song (Cameo appearance)

== Soundtrack ==
The music is provided by Avadhoot Gupte and Sachin Pilgaonkar.

Nihira Joshi has given female playback for the song "Khulya Jagachi Reet" with Sachin Pilgaonkar.

=== Track listing ===
No.	Title	Length
1.	"Aho Baghel Kunitari Aamhi Nahi Jaa"	04:19
2.	"Laga Motariya Ka Dhakka Balam Kalkatta Pahunch Gaye"	04:37
3.	"Khulya Jagachi Reet Visrun Ye Na"	04:28
4.	"Ideachi Kalpana (Title Track)"	03:47
