= List of songs recorded by Suresh Wadkar =

Suresh Ishwar Wadkar (born 7 August 1955) is an Indian playback singer known for his work in Hindi and Marathi cinema. He has also contributed to Bhojpuri films, Konkani cinema, Odia music albums, and devotional songs.

In 2020, he was honoured with the Padma Shri by the Government of India. Earlier, in 2018, he received the Sangeet Natak Akademi Award for Sugam Sangeet.

In 1968, at the age of 13, Wadkar was encouraged by his mentor, Jialal Vasant, to pursue the "Prabhakar" certification from the Prayag Sangit Samiti, a qualification equivalent to a B.Ed. Upon completing it, he began teaching music at Arya Vidya Mandir in Mumbai.

Although initially trained in Indian classical music, Wadkar's career took a significant turn when he participated in the Sur-Singar competition in 1976. His victory in the competition, judged by renowned composers like Jaidev and Ravindra Jain, opened the doors to playback singing. Ravindra Jain introduced him to the film industry with the song "Sona Kare Jhilmil Jhilmil Vrishti Pade Tapur Tupur" in Paheli (1977). Jaidev followed by offering him "Seene Mein Jalan" for the film Gaman (1978).

Impressed by Wadkar's voice, Lata Mangeshkar recommended him to composers such as Laxmikant–Pyarelal, Khayyam, and Kalyanji-Anandji. Laxmikant-Pyarelal soon collaborated with Wadkar for a duet with Lata, "Chal Chameli Bagh Mein", in Krodhi (1981). His career reached new heights with songs in films like Hum Paanch and Pyaasa Sawan, culminating in his major breakthrough with Raj Kapoor's Prem Rog (1982). Wadkar continued his association with the R.K. Banner, lending his voice to Rishi Kapoor in films like Henna, Prem Granth, and Bol Radha Bol, as well as to Rajiv Kapoor in Ram Teri Ganga Maili. Some of his iconic songs include "Tum Se Milke" from Parinda (1989) and "Aye Zindagi Gale Laga Le" from Sadma (1983).

In 2009, he debuted in Tamil cinema with the song "Naan Mozhi Arindhaen" from Kanden Kadhalai, a remake of Jab We Met. Over the years, Wadkar has also performed numerous devotional songs in multiple Indian languages for various religious sects, including Vaishnav and Shaivite traditions. In 1996, he collaborated with Asha Bhosle for the Konkani album "Daryachya Deger", singing tracks like "Channeache Rati".

Wadkar's contributions to Marathi music are equally remarkable. He has worked with some Marathi music directors, including Pt. Hridaynath Mangeshkar, Sudhir Phadke, Shrinivas Khale, Shridhar Phadke, Vasant Desai, Ashok Patki, Anand Modak and Anil-Arun, creating timeless classics in the regional music industry.

== Hindi songs ==
Year	Film	Song	Composer	Co-artist
1977	Paheli	"Saheli Ho Paheli Puccho"	Ravindra Jain	Hemlata, Chandrani Mukherjee
1977	Paheli	"Jaane Kaise Baje Ye Hawa"	Ravindra Jain	Solo
1978	Gaman	"Seene Mein Jalan"	Jaidev	Solo
1980	Hum Paanch	"Hum Paanch Pandav"	Laxmikant–Pyarelal	Shailendra Singh, Amit Kumar, Anwar
1981	Pyaasa Sawan	"In Hasi Wadiyon"	Laxmikant–Pyarelal	Lata Mangeshkar
1981	Pyaasa Sawan	"Megha Re Megha Re"	Laxmikant–Pyarelal	Lata Mangeshkar
1982	Maine Jeena Seekh Liya	"Chehra Kanwal Hai Aapka"	Nadeem–Shravan	Solo
1982	Prem Rog	"Main Hoon Prem Rogi"	Laxmikant–Pyarelal	Solo
1982	Prem Rog	"Mohabbat Hain Kya Cheez"	Laxmikant–Pyarelal	Lata Mangeshkar
1982	Prem Rog	"Bhanware Ne Khilaya Phool"	Laxmikant–Pyarelal	Lata Mangeshkar
1982	Prem Rog	"Meri Nasib Mein"	Laxmikant–Pyarelal	Lata Mangeshkar
1982	Disco Dancer	"Goron Ki Anjaan Na Kalon Ki"	Bappi Lahiri	Usha Mangeshkar
1983	Masoom	"Huzur Is Kadar"	R. D. Burman	Bhupinder Singh (musician)
1983	Sadma	"Ae Zindagi Gale Lagale"	Ilaiyaraaja	Solo
1983	Sadma	"Yeh Hawa, Yeh Fiza"	Ilaiyaraaja	Asha Bhosle
1984	Utsav	"Mera Man Baja Mridang"	Laxmikant–Pyarelal	Anuradha Paudwal, Aarti Mukherjee
1984	Utsav	"Sanjh Dhale"	Laxmikant–Pyarelal	Solo
1984	Bhaiya Dooj	"Apni Chhodi Se Karde Biyaah"	Chitragupt	Solo
1985	Ram Teri Ganga Maili	"Ram Teri Ganga Maili Ho Gayee"	Ravindra Jain	Solo
1985	Ram Teri Ganga Maili	"Yaara O Yaara"	Ravindra Jain	Lata Mangeshkar
1985	Ram Teri Ganga Maili	"Husn Pahadon Ka"	Ravindra Jain	Lata Mangeshkar
1985	Ram Teri Ganga Maili	"Main Hi Main Hoon"	Ravindra Jain	Solo
1986	Saveray Wali Gaadi	"Bin Payal Ke Chham Chham"	R. D. Burman	Solo
1986	Saveray Wali Gaadi	"Dekho Kaun Aaya"	R. D. Burman	Asha Bhosle
1987	Imaandaar	"Aur Is Dil Mein"	Kalyanji–Anandji	Solo
1987	Imaandaar	"Ae Kaash Dil-E-Nadan"	Kalyanji–Anandji	Solo
1987	Imaandaar	"Bada Shaitan Hai Dil"	Kalyanji–Anandji	Solo
1987	Imaandaar	"More Ghar Aaye Sajanwa"	Kalyanji–Anandji	Sadhana Sargam, Alka Yagnik
1987	Hifazat	"Mohabbat Hain Kya"	R. D. Burman	Asha Bhosle
1987	Thikana	"Aasman Chhat Ho Meri"	Kalyanji–Anandji	Solo
1987	Thikana	"Dua Samajh Lo"	Kalyanji–Anandji	Solo
1987	Thikana	"Thoda Sa Gham"	Kalyanji–Anandji	Solo
1988	Libaas	"Khamosh Sa Afsana Paani Se Likha Hota"	R. D. Burman	Lata Mangeshkar
1988	Hero Hiralal	"Bigdi Humein Banani Hain"	Babla & Kanchan	Mahendra Kapoor
1988	Waaris	"Ghata Chha Gayi Hain"	Uttam Singh	Lata Mangeshkar
1989	Chandni	"Lagi Aaj Sawan Ki"	Shiv–Hari	Anupama Deshpande
1989	Chandni	"Tu Mujhe Suna"	Shiv–Hari	Nitin Mukesh
1989	Purani Haveli	"Sangmarmar Sa Tha"	Ajit singh	Solo
1989	Purani Haveli	"Aata Hain Mujhko Yaad"	Ajit singh	Solo
1989	Toofan	"Jaadugar Ka Jaadu"	Anu Malik	Solo
1989	Toofan	"Aao Raas Rache Garba Raat Hain"	Anu Malik	Alka Yagnik
1989	Bhrashtachar	"Tere Naina Mere Naino Se"	Laxmikant–Pyarelal	Anuradha Paudwal
1989	Parinda	"Kitni Hain Pyaari Pyaari"	R. D. Burman	Shailendra Singh
1989	Parinda	"Sehra Main Dulha Hoga"	R. D. Burman	Shailendra Singh
1989	Parinda	"Pyaar Ke Mod Pe"	R. D. Burman	Asha Bhosle
1989	Parinda	"Tum Se Milke"	R. D. Burman	Asha Bhosle
1990	Maha-Sangram	"Chhodke Tujhko"	Anand–Milind	Mohammed Aziz
1990	Dil	"O Priya Priya"	Anand–Milind	Anuradha Paudwal
1990	Shiva	"Marte Hain"	Ilaiyaraaja	Asha Bhosle
1990	Shiva	"Meri Qadar Jani"	Ilaiyaraaja	S. Janaki
1991	Prahaar: The Final Attack	"Dhadkan Jara Rook Gayee Hain"	Laxmikant–Pyarelal	Solo
1991	Patthar Ke Phool	"Yaar Wai Wai, Yaar Wai Wai"	Raamlaxman	S. P. Balasubrahmanyam, Poornima, Manhar Udhas
1991	Aaj Ka Samson	"Le Le Tu Pyaar, De De Tu Pyaar"	Prem Gupta	Kavita Krishnamurti, Dilraj Kaur
1991	Kurbaan	"Baitha Neeli Jheel Kinare"	Anand–Milind	Anuradha Paudwal
1991	Henna	"Der Na Ho Jaye Kahin"	Ravindra Jain	Lata Mangeshkar
1991	Henna	"Janewale O Janewale"	Ravindra Jain	Lata Mangeshkar
1991	Henna	"Mein Der Karta Nahin"	Ravindra Jain	Lata Mangeshkar
1991	Lekin	"Surmai Shaam"	Hridaynath Mangeshkar	Solo
1991	Lamhe	"Yaad Nahi Bhool Gaya"	Shiv–Hari	Lata Mangeshkar
1991	Thalapathi	"Sundari Yeh Jeevan Tara"	Ilaiyaraaja	Sadhana Sargam
1991	Vansh	"Main Toh Deewani Huyi"	Anand–Milind	Lata Mangeshkar
1992	Ghar Jamai	"Dil Lagate Hain"	Anand–Milind	Sadhana Sargam
1992	Dil Aashna Hai	"Dil Aashna Hai"	Anand–Milind	Sadhana Sargam
1992	Parampara	"Maangti Hain Pyaasi Dharti"	Shiv–Hari	Kavita Krishnamurti, Anupama Deshpande, Vinod Rathod
1992	Aasmaan Se Gira	"Ghar Jaanam"	Louis Banks	Shailendra Singh, Kavita Krishnamurti
1993	Kayda Kanoon	"Parvaton Pe Chhayee Ghatayein"	Anand–Milind	Sadhana Sargam
1993	Kayda Kanoon	"Pawan Basanti Behne Lagi"	Anand–Milind	Kavita Krishnamurti
1993	Kayda Kanoon	"Zulfein Bikhraaye Baahon Mein"	Anand–Milind	Kavita Krishnamurti
1993	Lootere	"Ae Sawan Baras Zara"	Anand–Milind	Lata Mangeshkar
1993	In Custody	"In Custody"	Zakir Hussain	Kavita Krishnamurti
1993	Aaina	"Aaina Hain Mera Chehra"	Dilip Sen - Sameer Sen	Lata Mangeshkar, Asha Bhosle
1994	Udhaar Ki Zindagi	"Thodi Hasi Hai Toh Thode Aansu"	Anand–Milind	Udit Narayan, Kavita Krishnamurti, Sadhana Sargam
1995	Rangeela	"Pyaar Yeh Jaane Kaise"	A. R. Rahman	Kavita Krishnamurti
1996	Ghatak	"Nigahon Me Chheda"	R. D. Burman	Sadhana Sargam
1996	Ghatak	"Ek Dil Ki Diwani"	R. D. Burman	Sadhana Sargam
1996	Prem Granth	"Bajoo Bandh"	Laxmikant–Pyarelal	Alka Yagnik
1996	Muqadar	"Chal Kahi Chale Sajna"	Anand–Milind	Bela Sulakhe
1996	Maachis	"Chhod Aaye Hum"	Vishal Bhardwaj	Hariharan, KK, Vinod Sehgal
1997	Bhai	"Sajna Sajni"	Anand–Milind	Sadhana Sargam
1997	Lahu Ke Do Rang	"Sagar Mein Tarang Hai"	Anand–Milind	Sadhana Sargam
1997	Lahu Ke Do Rang	"Kiska Kasoor Hai"	Anand–Milind	Solo
1998	Satya	"Sapne Mein Milti Hai"	Vishal Bhardwaj	Asha Bhosle
1998	Sar Utha Ke Jiyo	"Meri Zindagi Meri Jaan"	Anand–Milind	Sonu Nigam
1999	Hu Tu Tu	"Nikla Neem Ke Tale Se"	Vishal Bhardwaj	Anuradha Paudwal, Kavita Krishnamurti, Roopkumar Rathod
2002	Dhumm	"Baa Ba Baara"	Gurukiran	K. S. Chithra
2002	Indra	"Jhoom Jhoom Ke Payal"	Mani Sharma	Solo
2005	Naam Gum Jaayega	"Tumse Milke Mujhe Aise Lagta Hai Kyon"	Anand–Milind	Sadhana Sargam
2006	Omkara	"Jaag Ja"	Vishal Bhardwaj	Solo
2006	Vivah	"Kal Jisne Janam Yaha Paaya"	Ravindra Jain	Kumar Sanu, Ravindra Jain
2006	Vivah	"Savaiyya"	Ravindra Jain	Solo
2008	Ek Vivaah... Aisa Bhi	"Dono Nibhayein Apna Dharam"	Ravindra Jain	Shaan, Shreya Ghoshal
2009	Kaminey	"Raat Ke Dhai Baje"	Vishal Bhardwaj	Rekha Bhardwaj, Sunidhi Chauhan, Kunal Ganjawala
2009	Kaminey	"Raat Ke Dhai Baje" (remix)	Vishal Bhardwaj	Rekha Bhardwaj, Sunidhi Chauhan, Kunal Ganjawala
2009	Ghauttham	"Shuruvagide Olage"	Gurukiran	Solo
2009	Kanden Kadhalai	"Naan Mozi Arindhen"	Vidyasagar	Solo
2011	7 Khoon Maaf	"Tere Liye"	Vishal Bhardwaj	Solo
2012	Yeh Khula Aasmaan	"Yeh Khula Aasmaan"	Anand–Milind	Solo
2014	Kahin Hai Mera Pyar	"Shaamil Yeh Ho Gaya"	Ravindra Jain	Ram Shankar
2014	Haider	"Do Jahaan"	Vishal Bhardwaj	Vishal Bhardwaj, Shraddha Kapoor
2024	Fighter	"Mitti"	Vishal–Shekhar	Solo
2024	The Sabarmati Report	"Raja Ram"	Kartik Kush	Kavita Krishnamurti

== Marathi songs ==
Year	Film	Song	Composer	Co-artist
1978	Sushila	"Jeevan Iska Naam Hai"	Ram Kadam	Uttara Kelkar
1979	Aayatya Bilavar Nagoba	"Holicha Rang Luta"	Ram Kadam	Ravindra Sathe, Uttara Kelkar
1979	Aayatya Bilavar Nagoba	"Jeevacha Maitar"	Ram Kadam	Ravindra Sathe
1979	Aayatya Bilavar Nagoba	"Aaj Tujhi Laaj Kashi"	Ram Kadam	Meera Panshikar
1979	Duniya Kari Salam	"Duniya Kari Salam"	Ram Kadam	Ravindra Sathe, Abhay Patwardhan
1979	Duniya Kari Salam	"Dev Jagavegla"	Ram Kadam	Ravindra Sathe, Ranjana Joglekar
1979	Duniya Kari Salam	"Bhagwan Aa Raha Hai"	Ram Kadam	Uttara Kelkar
1979	Janki	"Hodi Chale Latevari"	Hridaynath Mangeshkar	Usha Mangeshkar
1979	Javayachi Jaat	"Majhi Priya Hasavi"	Prabhakar Jog	Anuradha Paudwal
1979	Haldikunku	"Jhan Jhananana Chhedlya Tara"	Vishwanath More	Solo
1980	Bhalu	"Gandh Phulancha Gela Sangun"	Vishwanath More	Asha Bhosle
1980	Satichi Punyaai	"Sangu Kashi Priya Mi"	Prabhakar Jog	Anuradha Paudwal
1980	Ranpakhare	"Aabhal Varti Khali Dharti"	Vishwanath More	Asha Bhosle
1980	Ranpakhare	"Darbari Rasikjan Jamale"	Vishwanath More	Solo
1981	Gondhalat Gondhal	"Aga Naach Naach Radhe"	Vishwanath More	Uttara Kelkar
1981	Gondhalat Gondhal	"Dogha Lutuya Rang Bahar"	Vishwanath More	Anuradha Paudwal
1981	Gondhalat Gondhal	"Ha Mangala Ga Mangala"	Vishwanath More	Asha Bhosle
1981	Mosambi Narangi	"Koda Sodavu Kase"	Vishwanath More	Chandrashekhar Gadgil
1981	Sundara Satarkar	"Apar Ha Bhavsasagar"	Vishwanath More	Anuradha Paudwal
1981	Are Sansar Sansar	"Raja Lalkari Ashi De"	Anil-Arun	Anuradha Paudwal
1981	Are Sansar Sansar	"Kalya Matit Matit"	Anil-Arun	Anuradha Paudwal
1981	Are Sansar Sansar	"Vithoo Mauli Tu"	Anil-Arun	Sudhir Phadke, Jaywant Kulkarni
1981	Kaivari	"Aamhi Chalawu Ha Pudhe"	Prabhakar Jog	Anuradha Paudwal
1981	Kaivari	"Premala Upma Nahi"	Prabhakar Jog	Anuradha Paudwal
1982	Shapit	"Dis Jatil Dis Yetil"	Sudhir Phadke	Asha Bhosle
1982	Laxmichi Paule	"Jya Anubhutichya Sparshane"	Shridhar Phadke	Ranjana Joglekar
1982	Maai Baap	"Pyar Ek Rog"	Anil-Arun	Anuradha Paudwal
1982	Maai Baap	"Lek Chalali Sasarla"	Anil-Arun	Anuradha Paudwal
1982	Maai Baap	"Rajachi Na Ranichi"	Anil-Arun	Solo
1982	Don Baika Phajeeti Aika	"Jayna Jayna Kelya Don Baika"	Ram Kadam	Solo
1982	Bhannat Bhanu	"Sang Maza Hoshil Ka"	Ram Kadam	Usha Mangeshkar
1982	Chandane Shimpit Ja	"Kadhitari Kuthetari"	Prabhakar Jog	Anuradha Paudwal
1983	Gupchup Gupchup	"Gupchup Gupchup"	Anil-Arun	Asha Bhosle
1983	Gupchup Gupchup	"Pahile Na Mi Tula"	Anil-Arun	Solo
1983	Kashala Udyachi Baat	"Tula Me Pahave"	Yashwant Dev	Asha Bhosle
1984	Jagavegli Prem Kahani	"Jagavegli Prem Kahani"	Vishwanath More	Uttara Kelkar
1984	Jagavegli Prem Kahani	"Go Majhe Baay"	Vishwanath More	Uttara Kelkar
1984	Jagavegli Prem Kahani	"Laakh Timbachi Pratibimbachi"	Vishwanath More	Uttara Kelkar
1984	Jagavegli Prem Kahani	"Yaala Mhanati Jeevan Re"	Vishwanath More	Solo
1984	Hech Maze Maher	"Ye Aboli Laaj Dahi"	Ashok Patki	Anuradha Paudwal
1984	Hech Maze Maher	"Shodhito Radhela Shrihari"	Ashok Patki	Solo
1984	Mumbaicha Faujdar	"Ha Sagari Kinara"	Vishwanath More	Anuradha Paudwal
1984	Mumbaicha Faujdar	"Sahjeevnat Aali Hi Swapna Sundari"	Vishwanath More	Solo
1984	Kulswamini Ambabai	"Aai Jagadambe"	Vishwanath More	Anuradha Paudwal
1984	Bin Kamacha Navra	"Aga Aga Mhashi"	Rajendra Vinay	Uttara Kelkar
1984	Bin Kamacha Navra	"Vajeev Raja"	Rajendra Vinay	Uttara Kelkar
1984	Navri Mile Navryala	"Nishana Tula Disla Na"	Anil-Arun	Anuradha Paudwal
1984	Thakas Mahathak	"Aaj Panghruni"	Vishwanath More	Uttara Kelkar
1984	Sage Soyare	"Vishwanath Jovari Chalale"	Anil-Arun	Anuradha Paudwal
1985	Mahananda	"Maje Rani Maje Moga"	Hridaynath Mangeshkar	Lata Mangeshkar
1985	Dhum Dhadaka	"Aga Aga Pori Phaslis Ga"	Anil-Arun	Jyotsna Hardikar
1985	Dhum Dhadaka	"Priyatama"	Anil-Arun	Jyotsna Hardikar
1985	Dhum Dhadaka	"Dhanajirao Murdabad"	Anil-Arun	Solo
1986	Tu Saubhagyavati Ho	"Paygun Tujha Asa Rani"	Iqbaal	Anupama Deshpande
1986	Tu Saubhagyavati Ho	"De Tali De Tali"	Iqbaal	Anuradha Paudwal
1986	Mazha Ghar Mazha Sansar	"Drusht Laganya Hoge Saare"	Arun Paudwal	Anuradha Paudwal
1986	Mazha Ghar Mazha Sansar	"Hasnar Kadhi Bolnar Kadhi"	Arun Paudwal	Anuradha Paudwal
1986	Khara Warasdar	"Dis Aala Bhagyacha"	Arun Paudwal	Anuradha Paudwal
1986	Khara Warasdar	"Asach Hota Manat Majhya"	Arun Paudwal	Anuradha Paudwal
1986	Gadbad Ghotala	"Surya Ugavto Nabhat"	Suresh Kumar	Anuradha Paudwal
1986	Aamhi Dogha Raja Rani	"Aamhi Dogha Raja Rani"	Raamlaxman	Shobha Joshi
1986	Aaj Jhale Mukt Mi	"Swapna Dhund Bhav Manee"	Arun Paudwal	Anuradha Paudwal
1987	Sarja	"Chimb Pavsana Ran"	Hridaynath Mangeshkar	Lata Mangeshkar
1987	Sarja	"Mi Katyatun Chalun Thakale"	Hridaynath Mangeshkar	Lata Mangeshkar
1987	Khatyal Sasu Nathal Soon	"Urala Surala Gharpan Sarala"	Anil Mohile	Solo
1987	Khatyal Sasu Nathal Soon	"Sajana Mohana Rajasa"	Anil Mohile	Jyotsna Hardikar
1987	Khatyal Sasu Nathal Soon	"Saajni Sakar Jhale"	Anil Mohile	Jyotsna Hardikar
1987	Chal Re Lakshya Mumbaila	"Santoshi Mata Mauli"	Anil Mohile	Lata Mangeshkar
1987	Irsaal Karti	"Zara Jaude Zadun"	K. Shikandar	Uttara Kelkar
1987	Bhatakbhavani	"Tula Khula Mhanu Ki Shahana Mhanun"	Vishwanath More	Usha Mangeshkar
1987	De Danadan	"Majhya Urat Hotay Dhakdhak"	Anil Mohile	Jyotsna Hardikar
1987	Prem Karuya Khullam Khulla	"Me Yeu Ka"	Ashok Patki	Bela Sulakhe
1988	Bandiwan Mi Ya Sansari	"Veglya Jagat Hya"	Vishwanath More	Asha Bhosle
1988	Nashibwan	"Chaar Chaughat Kaltil Na Khanakhuna"	Anand Modak	Solo
1988	Nashibwan	"Tujhya Dolyat Majha Man Distay"	Anand Modak	Asha Bhosle
1988	Mamla Porincha	"Tujhe Geet Othi"	Ashok Patki	Anuradha Paudwal
1988	Bandiwan Mi Ya Sansari	"Veglya Jagat Hya"	Vishwanath More	Asha Bhosle
1988	Ashi Hi Banwa Banwi	"Ashi Hi Banwa Banwi"	Arun Paudwal	Sachin, Sudesh Bhosale, Shailendra Singh, Amit Kumar
1988	Ashi Hi Banwa Banwi	"Hridayi Vasant Phulatana"	Arun Paudwal	Sachin, Sudesh Bhosale, Shailendra Singh, Anuradha Paudwal, Aparna Mayekar
1988	Ashi Hi Banwa Banwi	"Hi Duniya Maayajaal"	Arun Paudwal	Sachin
1989	Saglikade Bombabomb	"Na Sangtach Aaj He Kale Mala"	Arun Paudwal	Anuradha Paudwal
1989	Saglikade Bombabomb	"Ja Ja Nako Maru Tu Gamja"	Arun Paudwal	Amit Kumar
1989	Thartharat	"Ganpati Bappa Morya"	Anil Mohile	Usha Mangeshkar, Anand Shinde, Jyotsna Hardikar
1989	Rajane Wajawla Baja	"Sada Saravada"	Ashok Patki	Solo
1989	Bhutacha Bhau	"Rangaan Gori"	Arun Paudwal	Kavita Krishnamurti
1989	Balache Baap Brahmachari	"Balache Baap Brahmachari"	Sharang Dev	Vinay Mandke, Suhasini
1989	Balache Baap Brahmachari	"Bagh Saari Duniya Nijali"	Sharang Dev	Vinay Mandke
1989	Balache Baap Brahmachari	"Chaar Teen Don Ek"	Sharang Dev	Vinay Mandke
1989	Balache Baap Brahmachari	"Priticha Game Asa Nava"	Sharang Dev	Vinay Mandke, Kavita Krishnamurti
1989	Hamaal De Dhamaal	"Hamaal De Dhamaal"	Anil Mohile	Vinay Mandke, Jyotsna Hardikar
1989	Hamaal De Dhamaal	"Mi Aalo, Mi Pahila"	Anil Mohile	Purushottam Berde
1989	Dharla Tar Chavtay	"Halu Bol Raja"	Anil Mohile	Jyotsna Hardikar
1989	Dharla Tar Chavtay	"Rimzim Dhara Ni Wadal Vaara"	Anil Mohile	Jyotsna Hardikar
1989	Ek Gaadi Baaki Anadi	"Prathamesh, Parmesha"	Ashok Patki	Dilraj Kaur, Kavita Krishnamurti
1989	Aatmavishwas	"Re Man Mi Tula Vahile Rajasa"	Arun Paudwal	Anuradha Paudwal
1989	Gavran Gangu	"Gavran Majha Hiska"	Madhu Anand	Jyotsna Hardikar
1989	Gavran Gangu	"Aata Kasa Vattay"	Madhu Anand	Jyotsna Hardikar
1989	Gavran Gangu	"Javal Ye Mithit Ye"	Madhu Anand	Jyotsna Hardikar
1989	Gavran Gangu	"Jawani Udtiya"	Madhu Anand	Jyotsna Hardikar
1989	Kutha Kutha Shodhu Me Tila	"Kanha Kanha"	Anil Mohile	Kavita Krishnamurti
1989	Dost Majha Mast	"Sajna Re Jeev Zala"	Suhaschandra Kulkarni	Anuradha Paudwal
1990	Changu Mangu	"Bol Changu Bol Mangu"	Arun Paudwal	Sachin
1990	Changu Mangu	"Asale Changu Mangu Amhi Ulate Tangu"	Arun Paudwal	Anupama Deshpande, Uttara Kelkar
1990	Ghabraycha Nahi	"Ghabraycha Nahi"	Raamlaxman	Asha Bhosle
1990	Patli Re Patli	"Rang Ha Nava Aabhali"	Anil Mohile	Sadhana Sargam
1990	Ghanchakkar	"Cycle Majhi Kori"	Arun Paudwal	Solo
1990	Eka Peksha Ek	"Sada Saravada"	Arun Paudwal	Shobha Joshi
1990	Shejari Shejari	"Shejari Shejari"	Vishwas Patankar	Aniruddha Joshi
1990	Shejari Shejari	"Aala Aala Mauka"	Vishwas Patankar	Pradnya Khandekar, Anuradha Paudwal
1990	Shubha Bol Narya	"Lakh Molacha Deto Me Salla"	K. Shikandar	Solo
1990	Eija Bija Tija	"Bandh He Reshmache"	Aruna Borkar	Anuradha Paudwal
1990	Dhamaal Bablya Ganpyachi	"Gujarat Nu Dandiya"	Ashok Patki	Kavita Krishnamurti, Vinay Mandke, Uttara Kelkar
1990	Dhamaal Bablya Ganpyachi	"Tad Tad Tasha Bole"	Ashok Patki	Kavita Krishnamurti, Vinay Mandke, Uttara Kelkar
1990	Dhadakebaaz	"Hi Dosti Tutaychi Naay"	Anil Mohile	Sudesh Bhosale, Vinay Mandke
1990	Dhadakebaaz	"Jai Jai Ho Shambhu Deva"	Anil Mohile	Sudesh Bhosale, Vinay Mandke
1990	Aflatoon	"Photu Yeil Papera Mandi"	Anil Mohile	Usha Mangeshkar
1991	Maherchi Sadi	"Sasarla Hi Bahin Nighali"	Anil Mohile	Solo
1991	Mumbai Te Mauritius	"Navi Navi Hi Prit Moharli"	Anil Mohile	Devaki Pandit
1991	Jeeva Sakha	"Ae Jhipri Ga Baai"	Anil Mohile	Asha Bhosle
1991	Jeeva Sakha	"Are Buddhu Milala"	Anil Mohile	Asha Bhosle
1991	Jeeva Sakha	"Door Sakha Chalala"	Anil Mohile	Mohammed Aziz
1991	Ek Full Chaar Half	"Kanhaiya O Kanhaiya"	Anil Mohile	Alka Yagnik
1991	Aayatya Gharat Gharoba	"Hi Premnagari"	Arun Paudwal	Anuradha Paudwal
1991	Godi Gulabi	"Pahilya Bhetichi"	Ashok Patki	Kavita Krishnamurti, Vinay Mandke, Uttara Kelkar, Suhasini, Aparna Mayekar
1992	Jiwlaga	"Pritichya Jalyat Gavla Masa"	Anil Mohile	Asha Bhosle, Ashok Hande, Uttara Kelkar
1992	Jiwlaga	"Prem Kele Nahi Kela Gunha"	Anil Mohile	Asha Bhosle
1992	Jiwlaga	"Jhurate Me Dinraat Re"	Anil Mohile	Asha Bhosle
1992	Jiwlaga	"Gondhali Gondhali"	Anil Mohile	Ashok Hande, Jyotsna Hardikar
1992	Anuradha	"Swapnatlya Fulanchi"	Anil Mohile	Kavita Krishnamurti
1993	Saarech Sajjan	"Ya Rimjhim Rimjhim"	Nandu Honap	Sadhana Sargam
1993	Saarech Sajjan	"Dhoond Aakash He"	Nandu Honap	Sadhana Sargam
1993	Aapli Mansa	"Nakalta Ase Oon"	Ashok Patki	Asha Bhosle
1993	Garam Masala	"Ek Mi Ann Ek Tu"	Ashok Patki	Kavita Krishnamurti
1993	Ghaayaal	"Prem Majhe Tujhyavar Aahe"	Anand Modak	Kavita Krishnamurti
1993	Ha Chandra Jaaglela	"Sarit Sonchafa"	Shank Neel	Kavita Krishnamurti
1993	Ha Chandra Jaaglela	"Phoolanchi Papani Oli"	Shank Neel	Kavita Krishnamurti
1993	Ha Chandra Jaaglela	"Sosvena Udasi"	Shank Neel	Kavita Krishnamurti
1993	Bharla Ha Malvat Raktana	"Hi Tujhi Majhi Prit"	Amar Haldipur	Anuradha Paudwal
1993	Aikave Te Navalach	"He Roop Tujhe Phulrani"	Arun Paudwal	Anuradha Paudwal
1993	Aikave Te Navalach	"Chal Yena Mithit Ghena"	Arun Paudwal	Anuradha Paudwal
1993	Zapatlela	"Tujhya Majhya Premachi Godi"	Anil Mohile	Sadhana Sargam
1994	Bajrangachi Kamal	"Jau Nako Tu Dur Dur"	Anil Mohile	Sadhana Sargam
1994	Akka	"Daivane Je Janmache Naat Hota"	Anil Mohile	Asha Bhosle
1994	Rang Oletya Phoolancha	"Prit Tujhi Majhi"	Prabhakar Pandit	Kavita Krishnamurti
1994	Divya Divya Deepatkar	"All Strotams"	Shank Neel	Kavita Krishnamurti
1995	Sukhi Sansarachi 12 Sutre	"Kuni Nahi Aas Paas"	R. D. Burman	Asha Bhosle, Vijay Joshi
1995	Vahinichi Maya	"Kashi Aboli Aaj Baharli"	Anil Mohile	Sadhana Sargam
1998	Sarkarnama	"Majhya Swapnana Saath"	Anand Modak	Nobina Mirjankar
1999	Gharabaher	"Dhaav Ghe Karunakara"	Shridhar Phadke	Solo
2000	Dhani Kunkavacha	"Nako Ha Durava"	Shashank Powar	Sadhana Sargam
2000	Sawai Hawaldar	"He Data Neka Jeev"	Shrikant Thackeray	Anuradha Paudwal
2000	Sattadhish	"Aai Bhavani De Mala"	Achyut Thakur	Anuradha Paudwal
2001	Chimani Pakhar	"Majhya Gharacha Gokul Jhala"	Achyut Thakur	Anuradha Paudwal
2001	Chimani Pakhar	"Kashi Kalachi Chahul Aali"	Achyut Thakur	Solo
2001	Chimani Pakhar	"Kon Dakhvil Vat"	Achyut Thakur	Solo
2003	Suryoday Ek Navi Pahat	"Gandhit Ya Bhavnancha"	Manoj Shalendra	Sadhana Sargam
2005	Aamhi Asu Ladke	"Asech He Kase Base"	Ashok Patki	Devaki Pandit
2006	Sawal Majhya Premacha	"Premachi Dhundi Aali"	Achyut Thakur	Anuradha Paudwal
2008	Ek Daav Sansaracha	"Tuzi Lekare"	Ashok Patki	Sadhana Sargam
2008	Ek Daav Sansaracha	"Ghara Ghara Boka"	Ashok Patki	Sadhana Sargam
2008	Ek Daav Sansaracha	"Navlakha Payari"	Ashok Patki	Sadhana Sargam
2008	Hari Om Vithala	"Ba Vithala Dhav Pavre"	Abhijit Joshi	Solo
2008	Hari Om Vithala	"Bovryat Sansarachya"	Abhijit Joshi	Solo
2008	Hari Om Vithala	"Varkari Me"	Abhijit Joshi	Solo
2008	Hari Om Vithala	"Vitevari Ubha"	Abhijit Joshi	Solo
2009	Bokya Satbande	"Man Aakashache"	Shailendra Barve	Solo
2009	Zak Marli Bayko Keli	"Suravana Ya Talachi"	Raamlaxman	Sadhana Sargam
2010	Mee Sindhutai Sapkal	"Hey Bhaskara"	Ashok Patki	Solo
2012	Ajintha	"Shabdat Gothale Dukhha"	Kaushal Inamdar	Solo
2015	Mumbai-Pune-Mumbai 2	"Band Baaja"	Avinash–Vishwajeet	Bela Shende, Aanandi Joshi, Hrishikesh Ranade
2026	Lagna Aani Barach Kahi	"Sakharpuda"	Vaishali Samant	Avdhoot Gupte, Swapnil Bandodkar, Vaishali Samant, Maithili Joshi, Avani Tushar Nannajkar

== Odia songs ==
Year	Film	Songs	Composer	Co-artist
1981	Ulka	"E Jibana Mane Nuhen Aaha"	Bibhu Mohanty & Raju Mishra	Bhupinder Singh
1986	Jor Jar Mulak Tara	"Bopalo Kede Kede"	Arun Mohanty	Kavita Krishnamurti
1988	Kanyadana	"Gori Lo Gori"	Arun Mohanty	Anuradha Paudwal
2007	Gauchi Mu Gita Tori Pain	"Gauchi Mu Gita Tori Pain"	Gagan Bihari	Solo
2008	Biswa Sundari	"Janha Raijare Jaga"	Kartik Sahoo	Solo
2013	Mu Raja Tu Rani	"Jadugara Jadugara"	Malay Mishra	Ira Mohanty
2016	Gud Boy	"Aina Kahe"	Baidyanath Dash	Solo
2019	Samukaa	"Tu Mora Suneli Pari"	Subash Dash	Solo
2019	Aama Bhitare Kichhi Achhi	"To Bina"	Bikash Das	Nibedita
2023	Chhari Chiridele Tu	"Lekhi Deli Chhati Chiri"	Malay Mishra	Ira Mohanty

== Kannada songs ==
Year	Film	Song	Composer	Co-artist
2002	Dhumm	"Baa Baa Bara"	Gurukiran	K. S. Chithra
2003	Sri Ram	"Prem Bana"	Gurukiran	Kavita Krishnamurti
2009	Ghauttham	"Shuruvagide Olage"	Gurukiran	Solo

== Telugu songs ==
Year	Film	Song	Composer	Co-artist
2002	Indra	"Jhoom Jhoom"	Mani Sharma	Solo

== Tamil songs ==
Year	Film	Song	Composer	Co-artist
2009	Kanden Kadhalai	"Naan Mozhi Arindhen"	Vidyasagar	Solo

== Bhojpuri songs ==
Year	Film	Song	Composer	Lyrics	Co-artist
1981	Saiyan Tore Karan	Tohre Patri Kamaria Patang Goria	Chitragupt		Usha Mangeshkar
1983	Chukti Bhar Senur	Kahe Hamra Se Parda Ba"	Chitragupt	Majrooh Sultanpuri	Mahendra Kapoor
1983	Chukti Bhar Senur	"Na To Hamke Sobe De"	Chitragupt	Majrooh Sultanpuri	Usha Mangeshkar
1983	Hamar Bhauji	Bhaiya Hamre Ram Jaisan	Chitragupt	Anjaan	Shailendra Singh, Udit Narayan
1983	Hamar Bhauji	Ho Mori Bhouji Tohari Bahiniya	Chitragupt	Anjaan	Alka Yagnik
1983	Hamar Bhauji	Kaili Bharosa Tohar	Chitragupt	Anjaan	Asha Bhosle
1983	Hamar Bhauji	Tohke Dulha	Chitragupt	Anjaan	Asha Bhosle
1984	Thakurayeen	"Jab Paniya Jabania Ke"	Chand Pardesi		Anuradha Paudwal
1984	Thakurayeen	"Aaja Aaja Raja Kareja Mein"	Chand Pardesi		Anuradha Paudwal
1985	Piya Ke Gaon	Aankh Se Aankh Milke	Chitragupt		Alka Yagnik
1987	Dharti Ki Aawaz	Aaisa Gul Gulshan Sansar	Onkar	Sameer	
1987	Dharti Ki Aawaz	Mera Ghar Parivaar Bata Sushiyon Ka Sansar	Onkar	Sameer	
1987	Dharti Ki Aawaz	He Hari Jhinjhari Naiya Mori Paar Karo	Onkar	Sameer	
1987	Dharti Ki Aawaz	Bahua Piyare Kaise Karun Tera	Onkar	Sameer	Usha Mangeshkar
1989	Mai	Kaahe Sor Bhayil	Ram Babu	Shaktikishore Dubey	Alka Yagnik
1989	Mai	Samhara Na Ta Bhauji	Ram Babu	Shaktikishore Dubey	Anupama Deshpande
2006	Rangli Chunariya Tohre Naam	"Har Har Mahadev Sambhu"			

== Devotional songs ==
- Sunder Kand Part 1
- Omkar Swarupa
- Jai Shri Swaminarayan
- Sai Tum Yaad Aye
- Sai Naam Ek Rang Anek
- Sampoorana Geeta-Hindi
- Shiva Chalisa
- Gururaya Aathvito Tujhiye Paaya
- Om Namah Shivaya Mantra
- Namo Namaha He Pramukh Swami
- Koti Koti Vandan Kariye
- Swaminarayan Charan Kamalama
- Parabrahma Tame He Purushottam
