= List of Marathi films of 1990 =

A list of films produced by the Marathi-language film industry based in Maharashtra in the year 1990.

== 1990 releases ==
A list of Marathi-language films released in 1990.

Year	Film	Director	Cast	Notes	Ref(s)
1990	Changu Mangu	Bipin Varti	Ashok Saraf; Laxmikant Berde; Aruna Irani; Nivedita Joshi-Saraf; Kishori Shahane		
1990	Ghabraiche Nahin	V. K. Naik	Laxmikant Berde; Padma Chavan; Raja Gosavi; Rekha Rao		
1990	Dokyala Taap Nahin	Arun Vasudev Karnatki	Laxmikant Berde; Priya Arun; Varsha Usgaonkar; Lata Arun; Ravi Patwardhan; Sudhir Joshi		
1990	Lapwa Chhapwi	Arun Vasudev Karnatki	Laxmikant Berde; Ramesh Bhatkar; Aruna Irani		
1990	Aaghat	Ramakant Kavthekar	Ashok Saraf; Nilu Phule; Vikram Kharat; Meera Latkar; Anil Patki		
1990	Julum	Ravindra Mahajani	Ravindra Mahajani; Sunita Patil; Sudhir Dalvi; Kuldeep Pawar; Lata Arun		
1990	Dhamal Bablya Ganpyachi	Datta Keshav	Laxmikant Berde; Ashok Saraf; Priya Arun; Ravindra Berde; Sudhir Joshi; Ajit Vachani; Dinesh Hingoo; Nilu Phule		
1990	Ghanchakkar	Avinash Thakur	Ashok Saraf; Johnny Lever; Nilu Phule; Sachin		
1990	Shejari Shejari	Dilip Kolhatkar	Laxmikant Berde; Ravindra Berde; Ashok Saraf	The film was remade in Hindi as Sukh in 2005 with Govinda, Chunkey Pandey, Aarti Chaabria and Preeti Jhangiani.	
1990	Aamchyasarkhe Aamhich	Sachin Pilgaonkar	Ashok Saraf; Sachin Pilgaonkar; Nivedita Joshi Saraf; Varsha Usgaonkar; Rekha Rao; Sudhir Joshi; Viju Khote; Jairam Kulkarni; Mangala Sanzgiri		
1990	Palva Palvi	Dada Kondke	Dada Kondke; Usha Chavan; Shanta Inamdar; Bhalchandra Kulkarni; Raghavendra Kadkol		
1990	Dhumakool	N. S. Vaidya	Vijay Chavan; Prashant Damle; Alka Kubal		
1990	Shubha Bol Narya	Satish Ranadive	Laxmikant Berde; Alka Kubal		
1990	Tuzhi Mazhi Jamli Jodi	Raja Bargir	Nitish Bharadwaj; Sudhir Joshi; Savita Prabhune		
1990	Dhadakebaaz	Mahesh Kothare	Laxmikant Berde; Mahesh Kothare; Ashwini Bhave; Prajakta Kulkarni; Bipin Varti; Ravindra Berde		
1990	Eka Peksha Ek	Sachin Pilgaonkar	Ashok Saraf; Sachin Pilgaonkar; Laxmikant Berde; Archana Joglekar; Sukanya Kulkarni Mone; Kuldeep Pawar; Ajit Vachani; Ashok Shinde	The film stars Sachin Pilgaonkar as blind and Laxmikant Berde as deaf and was remade in Hindi as Hum Hain Kamaal Ke (1993)	
