= List of Marathi films of 1987 =

A list of films produced by the Marathi language film industry based in Maharashtra in the year 1987.

== 1987 Releases ==
A list of Marathi films released in 1987.

Year	Film	Director	Cast	Release Date	Producer	Notes	Source
1987	Sarja	Rajdutt	Ajinkya Dev, Pooja Pawar, Ramesh Deo, Seema Deo, Kuldeep Pawar, Nilu Phule		Seema Deo	National Film Award for Best Feature Film in Marathi in 1987	
1987	Khatyal Sasu Nataal Soon	N. S. Vaidya	Nitish Bharadwaj				
1987	Anyay	Satish Ranadive					
1987	Chal Re Laxya Mumbaila	Satish Ranadive	Laxmikant Berde				
1987	Irasaal Karti	Pitambar Kale	Madhu Apte, Laxmikant Berde, Mukund Chitale		D.S. Kulkarni & Co., Om Sai Films, Sheetal Chtire Prakashan		
1987	Porichi Dhamaal Baapachi Kamaal	Datta Keshav					
1987	Premasathi Vattel Te	Datta Keshav	Laxmikant Berde, Usha Bhende, Padma Chavan	May 1987 (India)	Everest Entertainment		
1987	Purnasatya	Bhaskar Jadhav	Madhu Apte, Shantaram Choughule, Anju Dhariya				
1987	Muka Ghya Muka	Dada Kondke	Dada Kondke		Dada Kondke		
1987	Anandi Anand	Rajdutt	Prashant Damle, Vijay Kadam, Ashok Saraf, Kishori Shahane				
1987	Chhakke Panje	V.K. Naik	Prema Kiran, Shreeram Lagoo, Dilip Prabhavalkar				
1987	Bhatak Bhavani	Dinkar D. Patil					
1987	Sant Gajanan Shegavicha	Datta Keshav					
1987	De Danadan	Mahesh Kothare	Laxmikant Berde, Mahesh Kothare, Nivedita Joshi, Prema Kiran		Mahesh Kothare		
1987	Prem Karuya Khullam Khulla	Girish Ghanekar	Nayana Apte Joshi, Laxmikant Berde, Suresh Bhagwat				
1987	Gammat Jammat	Sachin	Sachin, Ashok Saraf, Varsha Usgaonkar		Shri Tulsi Productions		
