= Aamchyasarkhe Aamhich =

1990 film by Sachin Pilgaonkar

- Theatrical release poster
- Directed by: Sachin Pilgaonkar
- Written by: Sachin Pilgaonkar
- Screenplay by: Vasant Sabnis
- Produced by: Prakash Patil
- Starring: Ashok Saraf; Sachin Pilgaonkar; Nivedita Joshi Saraf; Varsha Usgaonkar; Rekha Rao; Sudhir Joshi; Jairam Kulkarni; Viju Khote; Mangala Sanzgiri
- Cinematography: Charudatta Dukhande
- Edited by: Avinash Thakur; Chintu Dhavale
- Music by: Arun Paudwal
- Production company: Shree Tirupati Balaji Chitra
- Distributed by: Murlidhar Rao Patil
- Release date: 1 November 1990 (Maharashtra)
- Running time: 138 minutes
- Country: India
- Language: Marathi

Aamchyasarkhe Aamhich (translation: We Are Incomparable) is a 1990 Indian Marathi-language comedy drama film written and directed by Sachin Pilgaonkar and produced by Prakash Patil. The film was released in Maharashtra on 1 November 1990 and stars an ensemble cast of Ashok Saraf, Sachin Pilgaonkar (both portraying double roles), Nivedita Joshi Saraf, Varsha Usgaonkar, Rekha Rao, Sudhir Joshi, Jairam Kulkarni, Viju Khote and Mangala Sanzgiri.

== Plot ==
Nirbhay (Ashok Saraf) and Abhay (Sachin Pilgaonkar) are both orphaned brothers and heirs to the wealthy Inamdar family, who win a court case involving their luxurious mansion against their estranged stepuncle, Chandrakant (Sudhir Joshi). In a fit of rage, Chandrakant storms into the Inamdar family's mansion at Gangapur, Maharashtra and threatens to seek revenge from Nirbhay and Abhay within two months. Therefore, the elderly, widowed Maai (Mangala Sanzgiri), Nirbhay and Abhay's grandmother and Chandrakant's stepmother, expresses her concern about her grandsons to Nirbhay and Abhay's loyal personal assistant, Diwanji (Jairam Kulkarni), who takes care of all the legal matters in the family. As fate would have it, Diwanji encounters Bhupal (also Ashok Saraf) and Kailas (also Sachin Pilgaonkar), two homeless friends, who make their living by acting as conmen with the help of Bhupal's girlfriend, Champa (Nivedita Joshi Saraf), and are exact lookalikes of Nirbhay and Abhay, respectively. Exploiting this situation, Diwanji, Nirbhay and Abhay mysteriously instruct Bhupal and Kailas to assume Nirbhay and Abhay's identities and live in the Inamdar family's mansion at Gangapur for two months in exchange of ₹2 lakh.

Not wishing to leave such a chance in finally being able to acquire riches, Bhupal and Kailas agree to the instruction and are dressed as Nirbhay and Abhay by Diwanji. The duo then bids farewell to Champa and is taken by Diwanji to Gangapur to begin the task, while the real Nirbhay and Abhay temporarily reside in their another mansion in Mumbai. Unlike Nirbhay and Abhay, Bhupal and Kailas are bold and savage by nature, who learn how to live like rich people and enjoy their newfound lifestyle. During the pretence, Bhupal finds his life miserable by the return of Nirbhay's ex-wife, Pramila (Rekha Rao), while Kailas falls in love with Nandini (Varsha Usgaonkar), the daughter of a retired Captain (Viju Khote), who has been engaged to Abhay. Later, however, Bhupal and Kailas are shocked to learn that Nirbhay and Abhay have interchanged their lives with them for their own security purposes, since the plan of them and Diwanji is that the revenge-seeking Chandrakant will kill Bhupal and Kailas, believing them both to be Nirbhay and Abhay, and the police will arrest him for the crime accordingly, allowing the real Nirbhay and Abhay to remain safe and protected. Bhupal and Kailas swear to teach Nirbhay and Abhay a lesson and also fight against Chandrakant to gain victory for the Inamdar family. Will Nirbhay and Abhay realise their wrongdoings?

== Cast ==
- Ashok Saraf in a double role as
  - Bhupal
  - Nirbhay Dinanath Inamdar
- Sachin Pilgaonkar in a double role as
  - Kailas
  - Abhay Dinanath Inamdar
- Nivedita Joshi Saraf as Champa (Bhupal's girlfriend)
- Varsha Usgaonkar as Nandini (Abhay's fiancée)
- Rekha Rao as Pramila Nirbhay Inamdar (Nirbhay's wife)
- Sudhir Joshi as Chandrakant Raghunath Inamdar (Nirbhay and Abhay's estranged uncle)
- Jairam Kulkarni as Diwanji (Nirbhay and Abhay's personal assistant)
- Viju Khote as Captain Saheb (Nandini's father)
- Mangala Sanjhagiri as Maai Raghunath Inamdar (Nirbhay and Abhay's paternal grandmother)
- Bipin Varti as Balu Pahelwan (Chandrakant's henchman)
- Suhas Bhalekar as Jyotishi Joshi Bua (Chandrakant's astrologer)
- Ravindra Berde as Dr. Doke (psychiatrist who examines Bhupal)
- Madhu Apte as Street Vendor

== Soundtrack ==
Amchyasarkhe Aamhich

Soundtrack album by Arun Paudwal
- Released: 1990
- Genre: Feature film soundtrack
- Length: 21:03
- Language: Marathi
- Label: T-Series

Official audio
- Aamchyasarkhe Aamhich - Full Album on YouTube

The music is composed by Arun Paudwal and lyrics penned by Shantaram Nandgaonkar.

Track listing
No.	Title	Singer (s)	Length
1.	"Amchyasarkhe Aamhich"	Sachin, Shailendra Singh	3:28
2.	"Ratra Aahe Reshmachi"	Anuradha Paudwal	5:07
3.	"Aapla Ghoda Ha Emani"	Sachin, Shailendra Singh, Kavita Paudwal	4:49
4.	"Aala Re Aala Ganpati Aala"	Sachin, Shailendra Singh	7:17
Total length:			21:03

Anuradha Paudwal won her 4th Maharashtra State Film award from this film as the best female playback singer.
