= Hingangaon (Kavathe Mahankal) =

- Village
- Location in Maharashtra, India
- Coordinates: 16°58′48.9″N 74°51′35.7″E
- Country: India
- State: Maharashtra
- District: Sangli
- Established: 1 April 1922
- Named for: हिंगणमिटकाची झाडे

Government
  - Type: Gram panchayat
  - Body: Gram Panchayat

Population (2011)
  - Total: 4,832

Languages
  - Official: Marathi
- Time zone: UTC+5:30 (IST)
- PIN: 416405

Hingangaon is a village and Gram panchayat in Kavathe Mahankal, Sangli district of Maharashtra, India. It is located near the Maharashtra-Karnataka border and is approximately 10 km from the Miraj-Pandharpur highway, 50 km from Sangli.

== Location ==
Hingangaon is situated on the banks of the river Agrani(अग्रणी), about 3 km south to Kavathe Mahankal. near to Karnataka border is 25 km away from this village.

== Demography ==
According to 2011 census:

Population: 4832

Family 1035

Sex ratio: 999

Literacy: 83.34%

Children(0-6 age): 455 (9.42%)

Child Sex ratio: 827

== Art and culture ==
Hingangaon having an old-style fortified stone house, called "WADA" in Marathi still constructed as a community work.

Hingangaon is famous for God Vithala Narayan festival which is part of 15th century bhaki movement in Maharashtra

Hanuman temple is situated to the North of the village. It celebrates an annual fair in December in the month of Margashirsha. Yallamma temple is situated to the South of the village. It celebrates an annual fair on Chaitra Purnima (Full Moon) in the month of Margashirsha.

Girling a Hill Shiva temple from this village about 12 km,

== Climate ==
Hingangaon has a semi-arid climate with three seasons, a hot, dry summer from the middle of February to the middle of June, a monsoon from the middle of June to late October and a mild cool season from early November to early February. The total rainfall is about 22 inches (580 mm).

== Economy ==
The village is particularly known for "Teacher village" most of the people from this village opted for the profession as working employment for example teaching, army, Engineers doctors another workforce in agriculture, Other work includes painting, construction, Plumbing, Handcraft. A new Textile Industries started in this village as Payod industries, which added employment to household women

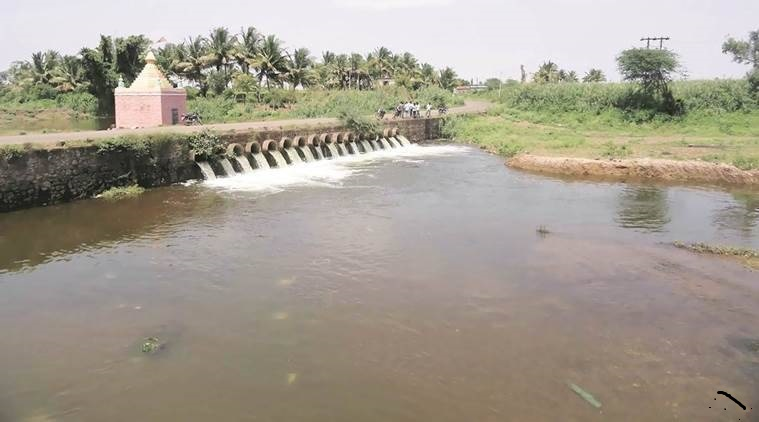
Agrani river which flows mainly in June & July month of every year

== Schools ==
- Shri Narayan Tatoba Sagare Vidyalaya, Hingangaon (S.N.T.S.V.H.)
- Zilha Parishad Primary School, Hingangaon

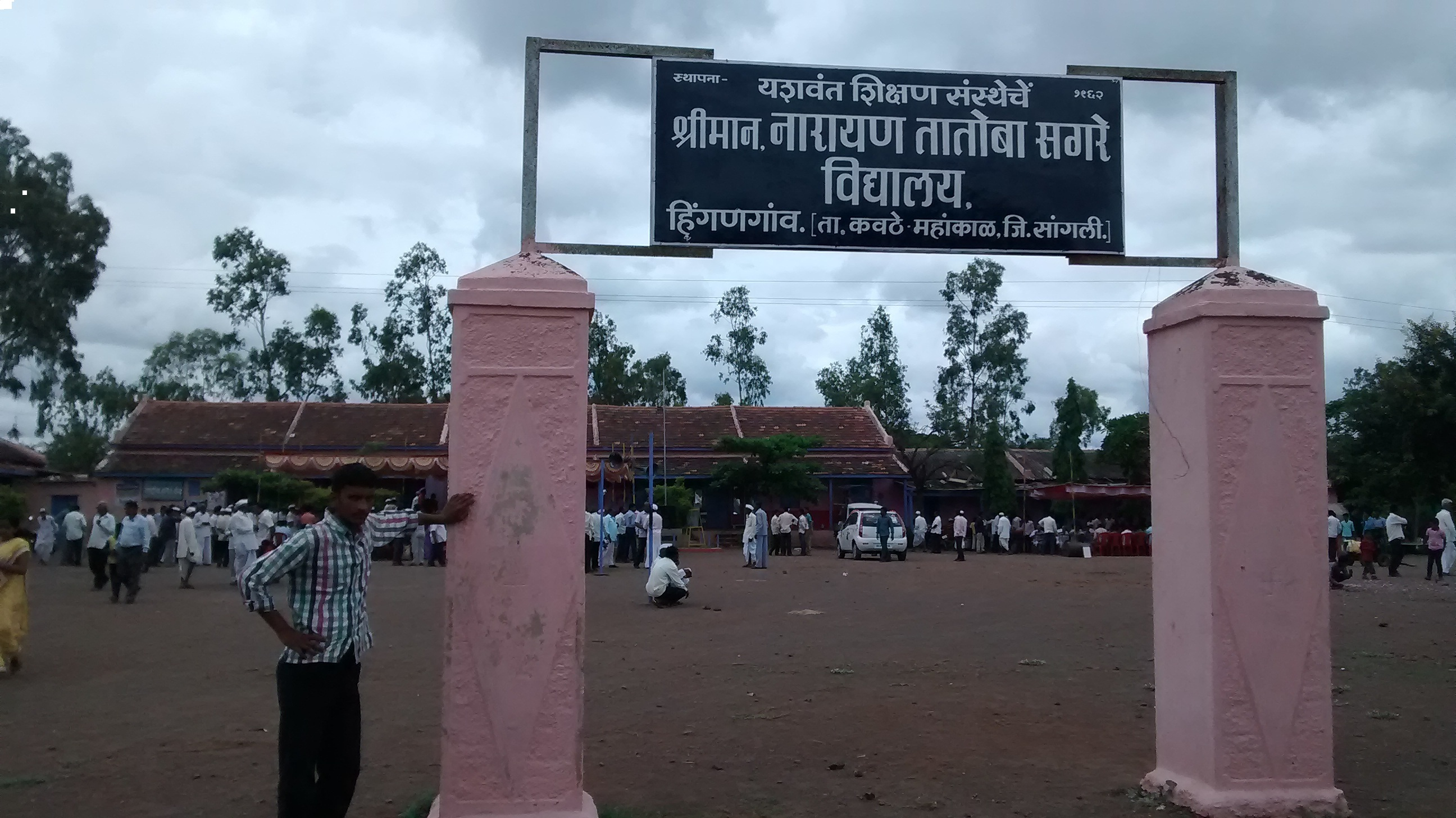
Shri Narayan Tatoba Sagare Vidyalaya, Hingangaon (S.N.T.S.V.H.)

== Transport ==
Transport is mainly carried by the government buses of M.S.R.T.C. via two main centres viz. Kavathe Mahankal and Miraj. Some private means like taxis, trucks are also available. Locals use bicycles, two-wheelers and four-wheelers.

- Air : Nearest airport is Kolhapur but not fully integrated for domestic flight, therefore Pune is nearest Airport about 250 km away.
- Rail : Nearest railway station is in Kavathe Mahankal about 15 km away.
- Road : Roads are good. Road connectivity is good especially to Kavathe Mahankal and Athani(KA) (via सलगरे)

== See also ==
- Kavathe Mahankal
- Sangli
- Kolhapur
