= Ashwini Ye Na =

1987 Indian Marathi-language song

Song by Anuradha Paudwal, Kishore Kumar

from the album Gammat Jammat
- Language: Marathi
- Released: 19 January 1987
- Genre: Filmi; pop
- Length: 5:00
- Label: T-Series
- Composer: Arun Paudwal
- Lyricist: Shantaram Nandgaonkar

"Ashwini Ye Na" is a Marathi song from the 1987 film Gammat Jammat, performed by Kishore Kumar, marking his debut in Marathi music. The song features Ashok Saraf and Charusheela Sable on screen and became a massive hit, widely regarded as one of the finest tracks in Marathi cinema.

== Development ==
During the filming of Gammat Jammat, Sachin Pilgaonkar approached Kishore Kumar to sing the song "Ashwini Ye Na." Kishore Kumar was initially reluctant to sing in Marathi, as he wasn't fluent in the language. Additionally he struggled with pronouncing the sounds "च" (cha) and "ळ" (la). To address this, Pilgaonkar and Shantaram Nandgaonkar wrote the song in a way that avoided these two sounds. Pilgaonkar also choreographed the dance, as the choreographer was absent on the day of the song shoot.

Kishore Kumar had promised Ashok Saraf that he would sing for him in all his upcoming songs. Saraf mentioned that he had told Kishore Da that Sachin Pilgaonkar was the usual singer in his films, but he lacked that ability. Kishore Kumar assured them, saying, "Sachin, you can sing your own songs, but for Ashok, I will provide the voice." Kishore Kumar died shortly after. However, before his death, he had already recorded another song, "Tujhi Majhi Jodi Jamali", which was also intended for Saraf. In his career, Kishore Kumar sang just two Marathi songs.

== In popular culture ==
The song was recreated for the 2019 film Ye Re Ye Re Paisa 2, with vocals by Avadhoot Gupte and Mugdha Karhade.
