= Gammat Jammat =

- Theatrical release poster
- Directed by: Sachin Pilgaonkar
- Written by: Vasant Sabnis
- Based on: The Fuzzy Pink Nightgown by Norman Taurog
- Produced by: Satish Kulkarni
- Starring: Ashok Saraf; Sachin Pilgaonkar; Varsha Usgaonkar; Charusheela Sable; Shrikant Moghe; Ashalata Wabgaonkar; Viju Khote; Satish Shah; Sudhir Joshi
- Cinematography: Suryakant Lavande
- Music by: Arun Paudwal
- Production company: Shree Tulsi Productions
- Distributed by: Everest Entertainment
- Release date: 1 May 1987
- Running time: 145 minutes
- Country: India
- Language: Marathi

Gammat Jammat (translation: Fun And Frolic) is a 1987 Indian Marathi-language slapstick comedy film written by Shantaram Nandgaonkar, directed by Sachin Pilgaonkar, and produced by Satish Kulkarni under Shree Tulsi Productions. The film was released on 1 May 1987 and stars an ensemble cast of Ashok Saraf, Sachin Pilgaonkar, Varsha Usgaonkar (in her debut in Marathi cinema), Charusheela Sable, Shrikant Moghe, Ashalata Wabgaonkar, Viju Khote, Satish Shah, and Sudhir Joshi. The music was composed by Arun Paudwal. This movie was remade in 1989 in Telugu as 'Vintha Dongalu'. Gammat Jammat was critically acclaimed and it did massive business at the box office. The film is still regarded as one of the best in Marathi cinema for its captivating story and Varsha Usgaonkar's performance.

== Plot ==
Gautam (Sachin Pilgaonkar) and Phalgun (Ashok Saraf) are childhood friends residing in the bungalow of Gautam's another childhood friend, Shrikant Dalvi (Chetan Dalvi). The duo is desperately in need of a huge sum of money since Gautam, who is a bar waiter, needs to pay for the leg surgery of his crippled younger brother, Suhas (Dhruv Ghanekar), while Phalgun, who is a clerk in a warehouse, needs to pay off all his debts to his creditors. However, Gautam and Phalgun has no means to receive the money by honesty and legal ways. At the last resort, the duo is compelled to plan to kidnap Kalpana (Varsha Usgaonkar), the only daughter of a wealthy industrialist, Dadasaheb Korde (Shrikant Moghe). They decide to place their plan into action in a foolproof way and execute the kidnapping of Kalpana successfully and perfectly. However, Gautam and Phalgun are both surprised to discover that Kalpana's father is not ready to pay out even a penny for the ransom, seeing through their true nature, and has already sent Inspector Phutane (Satish Shah) and crime lord Ganu Pailwan (Viju Khote) to investigate the matter.

To add to the duo's miseries, Kalpana is not a model victim of kidnapping either and dominates Gautam and Phalgun throughout the film. She also treats the duo like her servants and shockingly orders them both to hand over one-third of the ransom from her father to herself. The situation is further complicated when Mama (Sudhir Joshi), Shrikant's uncle and the owner of the bungalow, arrives from Dubai to stay at the bungalow for a day, followed by Inspector Phutane in search of Gautam and Phalgun. However, Kalpana acts as Gautam's wife in front of Mama and Phalgun's wife in front of Inspector Phutane in order to co-operate with the duo for her share of the ransom from her father. One day, Gautam receives a letter from Shrikant informing that he has made the job arrangements of him and Phalgun in Delhi. Gautam and Phalgun are both extremely delighted with this news and disregard Kalpana's existence, stating that she is now free to return home.

However, a heartbroken Kalpana slaps Gautam and confesses that she has feelings for him, which was the sole reason of her cooperative stay with him at the bungalow. Gautam reciprocates Kalpana's feelings while Phalgun also returns home to reunite with his wife, Ashwini (Charusheela Sable). Kalpana decides to drop Gautam, Phalgun and Ashwini off at the railway station, but Kalpana's car is spotted and pursued on the way by Ganu Pahelwan and his henchmen. Ganu Pahelwan eventually manages to capture Gautam and Phalgun and presents them both as guilty to Kalpana's father. However, Kalpana arrives and narrates a fake story that Gautam and Phalgun had instead rescued her from her kidnappers and expresses her wish to marry Gautam. Despite this, Gautam intervenes and confesses the truth to Kalpana's father, who forgives him and approves of his marriage with Kalpana by citing Gautam's honesty and courage. Meanwhile, Gautam is surprised to learn that Kalpana has already paid for the leg surgery of Suhas before her father also makes the job arrangements for Gautam and Phalgun.

== Cast ==
- Sachin Pilgaonkar as Gautam "Rushi"
- Ashok Saraf as Phalgun Vadke
- Varsha Usgaonkar as Kalpana Dadasaheb Korde / Mrs. Gautami (fake) / Mrs. Phalgun Vadke (fake)
- Charusheela Sable as Ashwini Phalgun Vadke (Phalgun's wife)
- Shrikant Moghe as Dadasaheb Korde (Kalpana's father)
- Ashalata Wabgaonkar as Mrs. Dadasaheb Korde (Kalpana's mother)
- Viju Khote as Ganu Pailwan (a local crime lord hired by Dadasaheb)
- Satish Shah as Inspector Phutane (Gautam's acquaintance)
- Dhruv Ghanekar as Suhas (Gautam's crippled younger brother)
- Jairam Kulkarni as Gautam's employer and the owner of a bar
- Ravindra Berde as Phalgun's employer in a warehouse
- Suhas Bhalekar as Sonya Kaka (Phalgun and Ashwini's neighbour)
- Manorama Wagle as Sonya Kaku (Phalgun and Ashwini's neighbour)

=== Cameo Appearances ===
- Chetan Dalvi as Shrikant Salvi / Shrikant Mama Dalvi (Gautam's childhood friend)
- Sudhir Joshi as Mama Dalvi (Shrikant's maternal uncle and the owner of the bungalow)
- Bipin Varti as Gotya Bharat Kumar (Gautam and Phalgun's unsuccessful kidnapping victim)
- Madhu Apte as Budha (the domestic worker of the bungalow)
- Ajay Wadhavkar as Hairy drunk customer in Gautam's bar
- Janardhan Parab as Bald drunk customer in Gautam's bar

== Soundtrack ==
Gammat Jammat

Soundtrack album by Arun Paudwal
- Released: 24 November 2016
- Genre: Feature film soundtrack
- Length: 21:19
- Language: Marathi
- Label: T-Series

Official audio
- Gammat Jammat - Full Album on YouTube

The soundtrack was composed by Arun Paudwal and the lyrics written by Shantaram Nandgaonkar. The song "Ashwini Ye Na" attained huge popularity. The song was remade in 2019, for the Ye Re Ye Re Paisa 2, sung by Avadhoot Gupte and Mugdha Karhade.

#	Song	Singer
1	"Ashwini Ye Na"	Kishore Kumar, Anuradha Paudwal
2	"Mi Aale Nighale"	Anuradha Paudwal
3	"Mi Re Tujhya Sangtina Aaj Yeu Kashi"	Anuradha Paudwal
4	"Choricha Mamla Mamahi Thambla"	Sachin Pilgaonkar, Anuradha Paudwal

Anuradha Paudwal won her Maharashtra state film award for the best female playback singer.
