= Gangaram (character) =

Fictional character

- Dhadakebaaz character
- Laxmikant Berde as Gangaram
- First appearance: Dhadakebaaz; (1990)
- Created by: Mahesh Kothare
- Portrayed by: Laxmikant Berde

In-universe information
- Alias: Genie Gangaram
- Gender: Male
- Significant other: Kavtya Mahakal

Gangaram (Indian English: [ˈɡɑːn.ɡə.rʌm]; Marathi pronunciation: [ɡaŋɡaːɾam]), is a fictional character from the 1990 Indian Marathi film Dhadakebaaz, created by Mahesh Kothare and portrayed by Laxmikant Berde. He is a cursed magician trapped in a bottle for centuries, and released by his descendant Laxmikant "Lakshya" Hajare. Gangaram aids Lakshya and his friends in their battle against the evil Kavtya Mahakal with the power of magical sand.

== Development ==
=== Initial concept and casting ===
The development of the Gangaram character began with Mahesh Kothare's vision for a fantasy-themed film following the success of Thartharat (1989). Kothare originally wanted actor Dada Kondke to play the role of the Gangaram. However Dada Kondke refused to take on the guest appearance. Despite several attempts to convince Kondke, including meeting him at his office and dubbing studios, the actor remained firm in his decision, citing his previous rejections of other major roles, such as those offered by renowned director Manmohan Desai.

Kothare revised his approach and decided to adapt the role of Gangaram into a double role for the character of Lakshya, played by Laxmikant Berde. When the shooting of Dhadakebaaz had begun, at the same time, Berde was approached for Maine Pyar Kiya by Sooraj Barjatya. After discussing with Kothare, Berde decided to allocate his dates for Maine Pyar Kiya once the shooting of Dhadakebaaz was complete.

=== Magical theme ===
A promotional poster features Laxmikant Berde as Gangaram, shown trapped inside a bottle. After thousands of years, the bottle is found by Laxmikant Hajare, Gangaram's pure-hearted descendant.

Kothare's interpretation of magic in the film was rooted in the idea that true magic resides within a person's own mind and self-power. The concept of external magical forces or illusions was secondary to the belief that personal strength and purity of heart held the real power to unlock extraordinary changes.

In the context of the Gangaram character, this theme was explored through his curse. Gangaram, after being cursed by his guru, finds himself locked inside a bottle. The curse stipulates that he can only be freed when a pure-hearted descendant of his captor touches the bottle, releasing him.

=== VFX and special effects development ===
The visual effects required to bring Gangaram in a bottle to life were one of the most ambitious technical aspects of Dhadakebaaz. In order to achieve this, Kothare traveled to the United States to gain expertise in VFX. This opportunity arose through a connection with director Ravi Chopra, who facilitated Kothare's communication with Paul, the VFX director at Twentieth Century Fox.

Kothare spent a year in the U.S., training in the VFX technologies, with a focus on blue screen technology, which was commonly used in American cinema at the time. However, he faced a challenge when the specific intermediate negatives required for the VFX shots were in short supply. Kothare first approached Kodak to inquire about intermediate stocks. Realizing that importing these materials would require large orders, Kothare contacted Peter Pereira, cinematographer of Ajooba (1990), who helped source the necessary film stock.

These imported negatives were critical for the creation of the Gangaram in a bottle effect. While Peter Pereira used some of the stock for his film, Kothare utilized the remainder for his own VFX work. Kothare to effectively bring the magical element of Gangaram's bottle to the screen.

== Fictional biography ==
Gangaram is a mysterious and ancient character, who was once a skilled magician and the ancestor of Laxmikant Hazare (Lakshya), one of the main protagonists of the film. Thousands of years ago, Gangaram was learning magic from a guru when a tragic accident occurred. Enraged by this, the guru cursed Gangaram by trapping him in a small bottle using magical sand. He was told that he would be freed from the curse only when his descendant used the sand for his own benefit.

Gangaram, trapped in the bottle for centuries, awaited his release. His freedom was eventually granted to his descendant Lakshya, who inadvertently brought him back to life. Once freed, Gangaram reveals his true identity to Lakshya and becomes an essential ally in his fight against the evil crime lord Kavtya Mahakal.

Throughout the film, Gangaram displays immense magical abilities, including using his powers to help Lakshya, Ganga, and their friends escape danger, heal wounds, and paint a temple in minutes. He plays a key role in helping Lakshya fight against evil forces.

Despite his magical prowess, Gangaram emphasizes the importance of mental power over magical abilities. Ultimately, after helping defeat the skull Mahakal and his companion Divya, Gangaram is finally freed from his curse. Before departing for his heavenly abode, Gangaram gives Lakshya and his friends one last piece of advice, urging them to remain united and always be powerful in the face of evil.

== Reception ==
The role of Gangaram has become a household name in the minds of the audience. Gangaram and Kavtya Mahakal becomes most popular characters at that time.
