= Pandegaon =

- Village
- Country: India
- State: Karnataka
- District: Belgaum
- Taluk: Athani

Population (2011)
  - Total: 2,107

Languages
  - Official: Marathi Kannada Hindi
- Time zone: UTC+5:30 (IST)
- Postal code: 591212
- Vehicle registration: KA23

Pandegaon is a village in the Belgaum district of Karnataka, India. At the bank of the Agrani River, it is bounded by the taluks of Athani to the south, Miraj to the west, Jat to the east and Kavathe-Mahankal to the northwest.

Pandegaon was part of Bombay State (now Maharashtra) up to 1960. The nearest railway stations are Agran Dhulgaon (5 km) and Kavathe-Mahankal (8 km). The nearest railway junction is Miraj, 40 km away, and Kolhapur airport is 90 km away.

Pandegaon is represented nationally as the Kagwad constituency of the Vidhana Sabha and the Chikkodi constituency of the Lok Sabha. The major industries are farming and military.

== 2011 census details ==
Population
Census Parameter	Census Data
Total population	2107
Total number of houses	513
Female population %	50.5 % ( 1065)
Total literacy rate %	62.5 % ( 1317)
Female literacy rate	27.2 % ( 574)
Scheduled tribes population %	0.0 % ( 0)
Scheduled caste population %	9.1 % ( 192)
Working population %	59.4 %
Child (0-6) population	239
Girl child (0-6) population %	46.9 % ( 112)
