= Anupama Deshpande =

Indian playback singer

- Born: 2 October 1953 (age 72); Bombay, Bombay State, India
- Occupation: Playback singing
- Years active: 1983-present

Anupama Deshpande is a Bollywood playback singer who has won the Filmfare Award for Best Female Playback Singer for her folk song "Sohni Chenab De" in the film Sohni Mahiwal (1984).

== Career ==
The song Sohni Chenab De in Sohni Mahiwal (1984) was originally meant for Asha Bhosle who was busy those days. Therefore, Anu Malik recorded this song in the voice of Anupama Deshpande so that it could later on be dubbed by Asha Bhosle, but on listening to the song, Bhosle advised to retain the song as it was, in the voice of Anupama Deshpande by giving full credit to the Anupama's singing talent. She has sung a total of 124 songs in 92 films.

== Notable songs ==
- "Pollaadha Madhana Baanam" from Hey Ram! (Tamil) with Ilaiyaraja
- "Sohni Chenab Di" from Sohni Mahiwal
- "Mee Aaj Nahatana" from Nirmala Machindra Kamble
- "Bhiyu Nako" Nirmala Machindra Kamble
- "Gabhru Nako" Nirmala Machindra Kamble
- "Mera Peshha Kharab Hai" from Bhediyon Ka Samooh
- "Parvat Se Jhan" from Bhediyon Ka Samooh
- "Humko Aaj Kal Hai" from Sailaab
- "Tum Mere Ho" from Tum Mere Ho
- "Main Teri Rani" from Lootere
- "O Yaara Tu Pyaron Se Hai Pyaara" from Kaash
- "Tumse Mile Bin Chain Nahin Aata" from Kabzaa
- "Bicchua" from Arth
- "Aankh mein Noor hai" from Yaa Ali Madad (Ismaili Geets)
- "Teri jawani badi mast mast hai" from Pyar kiya toh darna kya
- "Soponer Mollika Aaj Tomai Dilam" from Tumi Kato Sundor with Amit Kumar(Bengali)

== Marathi songs ==
Year	Film	Song	Composer(s)	Co-artist(s)
1987	Prem Karuya Khulllam khulla	"Prem Karuya Khulllam khulla Title Track" "Ganpati raya padto mi paya"	Ashok Patki	Vinay Mandake
1988	Thartharat	Sutlay ga Thartharat	Anil Mohile	Vinay Mandake, Sudesh Bhosle
1989	De Dhadak Bedhadak	tumchi hi por mala	Anil Mohile	Sudesh Bhosle
1990	Changu Mangu	"kashala dharla majha kombda" "Asle changu mangu" "Raag nako dharu"	Arun Paudwal	Sudesh Bhosle; Uttara kelkar Suresh Wadkar; Aparna Mayekar Suresh Wadkar
1990	Dhadakebaaz	Ye gangaram	Anil Mohile	Sudesh Bhosle
1991	Balidaan	Shet he baharle, Angaat aanand usalala, dis raaticha Karuya	Anil Mohile	Suresh Wadkar, Sudesh Bhosle, Ravindra Sathe
1993	Baazigar(Dubbed)	Jaadugar tu Jaadugar, Kiti pustake granth, samjun chandra jyala, tujhya chehryawari, ye sakhe sajani	Anu Malik	Vinod Rathore
1994	Akka	Parody song	Anil Mohile	Vinod Rathod
