= Kavtya Mahakal =

Fictional character

- Dhadakebaaz character
- Kavtya Mahakal (L) with his henchmen Divtya
- First appearance: Dhadakebaaz; (1990)
- Created by: Mahesh Kothare
- Portrayed by: Various (Note: It was primarily portrayed by Chandrakant Pandya and Bipin Varti, along with eight other uncredited actors.)
- Voiced by: Bipin Varti

In-universe information
- Gender: Male
- Occupation: Gangster
- Significant other: Gangaram
- Allies: Divtya

Kavtya Mahakal is a fictional antagonist from the 1990 Indian film Dhadakebaaz. Created by Mahesh Kothare, the character was portrayed by Bipin Varti who also provided the voiceover, and Chandrakant Pandya, along with eight other uncredited actors. The name Kavtya Mahakal was inspired by Kavathe Mahankal, a village in the Sangli district of Maharashtra. Kothare cast Gujarati actor and friend Chandrakant Pandya after a chance encounter, and Pandya's creative input greatly contributed to the character's popularity, even though he remained largely unrecognized during his lifetime.

== Development ==
Mahesh Kothare named the villain after Kavathe Mahankal village in Sangli district, and the character's face remains masked until the film's climax. Initially, Kothare had a different idea in mind – he wanted a talking skull. While exploring Los Angeles, he came across a 'skull mask' and purchased four of them. The role of Kavtya Mahakal was portrayed by eight actors, with Bipin Varti being the first. Varti provided the voiceover for the character throughout the film.

In his autobiography, Damn It Ani Barach Kahi, published in Mumbai, Mahesh revealed that the Gujarati actor and his friend Chandrakant Pandya got the role of Kavtya Mahakal after their chance meeting, where he offered Pandya a project despite the character requiring a mask. Pandya initially worked closely with Mahesh but later infused his own creativity, making the character popular, even though he wasn't widely recognized during his lifetime. Chandrakant Pandya appeared in numerous Gujarati films and is well known for his role as Nishad Raj in the popular Indian series Ramayan. He died on 21 October 2021, at the age of 72.

== Fictional biography ==
Kavtya Mahakal, a ruthless and sadistic crime lord, was the mastermind behind various criminal activities in Shivapur. His real name remains unknown, but his alias struck fear in the hearts of the villagers. With a mysterious past, Kavtya Mahakal's early life was marked by involvement in crime from a young age. He built a vast network of henchmen and associates, including Divtya, and rose to power through brutal and cunning tactics.

Kavtya Mahakal's notorious crimes included the murder of Sub-Inspector Uma Jadhav's parents, funding crime in Shivapur, and attempting to murder Lakshya and his friends. He terrorized Shivapur during the festival of Mahashivratri, leaving a trail of destruction and fear. Driven by a desire for power and control, Kavtya Mahakal sought revenge against Uma Jadhav for pursuing him. He also aimed to acquire the magical bottle containing Gangaram to further his criminal empire.

Kavtya Mahakal's personality was defined by his ruthlessness, cunning, and sadistic nature. He was power-hungry and manipulative, using his intelligence and strategic thinking to evade capture. However, his downfall came when he was defeated by Lakshya, Mahesh, and Bappa with Gangaram's help. Ultimately, Kavtya Mahakal was killed by Sub-Inspector Uma Jadhav in revenge for her parents' murder.

== Reception ==
Maharashtra Times featured Kavtya Mahakal as one of the most iconic villains in Marathi cinema. The Marathi news websites such Loksatta, Lokmat, Divya Marathi have noted that the character of Kavtya Mahakal remains prominent in the audiences.
