= Changu Mangu =

1990 film by Bipin Varti

- Directed by: Bipin Varti
- Screenplay by: Ashok Patole
- Story by: Rama Arangannal
- Produced by: Bipin Varti
- Starring: Ashok Saraf; Laxmikant Berde; Nivedita Joshi; Kishori Shahane; Aruna Irani; Raja Gosavi; Viju Khote; Nayantara; Jaywant Wadkar; Sudhir Joshi
- Cinematography: Ram Alam; Mayur Vaishnav
- Edited by: S. Rao
- Music by: Arun Paudwal
- Production company: Prathamesh Films
- Distributed by: Draupad Shah
- Release date: 1990
- Running time: 142 minutes
- Country: India
- Language: Marathi

Changu Mangu is a 1990 Indian Marathi-language comedy film produced and directed by Bipin Varti and written by Ashok Patole. The film stars an ensemble cast of Ashok Saraf, Laxmikant Berde, Aruna Irani, Nivedita Joshi, Kishori Shahane, Raja Gosavi, Viju Khote, Nayantara, Jaywant Wadkar. The music was composed by Arun Paudwal.

== Plot ==
Dadasaheb Dongre is a generous businessman who loves giving back to the community. Unfortunately, his sons, Changu Dongre and Mangu Dongre, are not responsible and misuse his money, causing trouble. Vishwasrao, the manager, is eyeing the business and waiting for an opportunity to take over. Frustrated with his sons' behavior, Dadasaheb kicks them out.

Changu and Mangu, along with their partners Mini Khatle and Sheela Khatle, plan a prank in Lonavala. They stage Changu's death, hoping Dadasaheb will call them back. Unexpectedly, Vishwasrao and his son Bajarang discover their plan and, thinking it's real, kill Changu. Mangu gets falsely accused of the murder. Meanwhile, Changu survives, but his family mistakes a lookalike named Ramanna for him in his absence. Ramanna, his girlfriend Rukmini and his mother Avva lives in Belgaum. After few circumstances, Mangu assumes Ramanna as Changu and take him to their home. The story unfolds hilarious situation.

== Cast ==
=== Main cast ===
- Ashok Saraf as Changu Dongre /Ramanna
- Laxmikant Berde as Mangu Dongre
- Aruna Irani as Rukmini; Ramanna's love interest
- Nivedita Joshi as Sheela Khatle; Mangu's love interest
- Kishori Shahane as Mini Khatle; Changu's love interest
- Raja Gosavi as Dadasaheb Dongre; Changu & Mangu's father
- Nayantara as Malati Dongre; Changu and Mangu's mother
- Viju Khote as Vishwasrao, Main antagonist
- Jaywant Wadkar as Bajrang; Vishwasrao's son
- Sudhir Joshi as Advocate Khatle
- Bhavana as Avva; Ramanna's mother
- Ravindra Berde as Koli Kaka
- Manorama Wagle as Koli Kaku
- Kedarnath Sehgal as Peter
- Sonu Sargam as Sonu
- Bipin Varti as Michael
- Vijay Patkar as Man who kidnaps Ramanna
- Avinash Thakur as Man who kidnaps Ramanna
- Ashok Patole as Inspector
- Avtar Singh Gullu as Man in a bar

=== Cameo appearance ===
- Sachin Pilgaonkar
- Varsha Usgaonkar
- Mahesh Kothare

== Soundtrack ==
Changu Mangu

Soundtrack album by Arun Paudwal
- Released: 1990
- Genre: Feature film soundtrack
- Length: 25:26
- Language: Marathi
- Label: Ishtar Music

Official audio
- Changu Mangu- Full Album on YouTube

Arun Paudwal composed music and lyrics are written by Shantaram Nandgaonkar.

Track listing
#	Title	Singer (s)	Lyrics	Length
1	"Aiyo Rama"	Sachin, Anuradha Paudwal	Shantaram Nandgaonkar	5:41
2	"Asale Changu Mangu Aamhi Ulate Tangu"	Suresh Wadkar, Anupama Deshpande, Uttara Kelkar	Shantaram Nandgaonkar	4:49
3	"Bol Changu Bol Mangu"	Sachin, Suresh Wadkar	Shantaram Nandgaonkar	3:52
4	"Kashala Dharla Majha Kombada"	Sudesh Bhosale, Anupama Deshpande	Shantaram Nandgaonkar	6:03
5	"Rag Nako Dharu Meri Jaan"	Sudesh Bhosale, Anupama Deshpande, Aparna Mayekar	Shantaram Nandgaonkar	5:16

== Remakes ==
The film was remade in Bollywood in the year 1993, with the title Aankhen, with Govinda and Chunky Panday playing the lead role.
