= Story of Laagir =

- Theatrical release poster
- Directed by: Roheet Rao Narsinge
- Written by: Roheet Rao Narsinge
- Produced by: B.N. Meshram; Yamini Waghade; Aditya Vikasrao Deshmukh; Roheet Rao Narsinge
- Starring: Roheet Rao Narsinge; Sanjay Khapre; Chaitali Chavan; Prema Kiran
- Cinematography: Mangesh Gadekar
- Edited by: Anil Madansuri
- Music by: Sunny-Sushant and Atul Joshi
- Production companies: G.K Films creations & MR JOKER ENTERTAINMENT
- Distributed by: UFO Cine Media Network
- Release date: 14 January 2022
- Running time: 130 minutes
- Country: India
- Language: Marathi

Story Of Laagir is an Indian Marathi-language drama film written and directed by Roheet Rao Narsinge and produced by G.K. Films Creations & MR Joker Entertainment. The film was theatrically released on 14 January 2022.

== Cast ==
- Sanjay Khapre
- Chaitali Chavan
- Roheet Rao Narsinge
- Prema Kiran
- Mohan Jadhav
- Millind Dastane
- Rutuja Andre
- Somnath Yelnure

== Soundtrack ==
Music is given by Sunny-Sushant and Atul Joshi. Lyrics is by Nihar Rajahans, B.Gopinathan.
