= Anil Mohile =

- Born: 1940
- Died: 1 February 2012 (aged 71–72)
- Occupation: Music composer

Anil Mohile (1940 - 2012) was an Indian music composer and music arranger.

== Early life ==
He was born in Mumbai, grew up in a musically rich environment. His grandfather, Pandharinath Mohile, played the harmonium, while his father was skilled in the bulbul tarang and flute. Anil started playing various instruments at the age of seven and performed tabla on All India Radio's Gammat-Jammat. He began formal training in violin under Mangesh Tendulkar at 12 and mastered the South Indian violin style under Vishnushastri Pandit. Anil passed the Sangeet Visharad exam with distinction and, in 1959, won the All India Radio competition, joining as a staff artist. During this period, he collaborated with music directors like Shrinivas Khale, Sudhir Phadke, Khayyam, and S.D. Burman, while also conducting orchestras and composing Marathi bhavgeet records.

== Music career ==
After a decade at AIR, Anil left to pursue a career as a full-time composer, debuting with Chal Re Laxya Mumbai La (1987). He composed music for iconic Marathi films like Thartharat, Hamaal De Dhamaal, Zapatlela, and Maherchi Sadi, among others. An integral part of Lata Mangeshkar's concerts, he teamed up with Arun Paudwal to form the celebrated “Anil-Arun” duo. Appointed as the first director of Mumbai University's "Music Direction and Arrangement" course, Anil Mohile left a lasting legacy in Marathi music and cinema.

Mohile composed music for several movies including Marathi and Hindi Films. He had worked closely with Lata Mangeshkar for many years. He arranged music for 85 films, including Amitabh Bachchan starrers Sharaabi and Don.

He also composed music with Arun Paudwal as a duo 'Anil-Arun'. Anuradha Paudwal had sung many songs under the composition of this music composer pair.

He died on Wednesday, 1 February 2012 morning, at his residence in Andheri, after suffering a massive heart attack. He was 71-year-old and is survived by his wife, daughter and son, Amar.

== Discography (as a music arranger) ==
Year	Film	Director	Language
1978	Don	Chandra Barot	Hindi
1980	Thodisi Bewafaii	Esmayeel Shroff	Hindi
1984	Sharaabi	Prakash Mehra	Hindi
1987	De Danadan	Mahesh Kothare	Marathi
1988	Ashi Hi Banwa Banwi	Sachin	Marathi
1988	Qayamat Se Qayamat Tak	Mansoor Khan	Hindi
1989	Thartharat	Mahesh Kothare	Marathi
1990	Dhadakebaaz	Mahesh Kothare	Marathi
1991	Maherchi Sadi	Vijay Kondke	Marathi
1991	Lekin...	Gulzar	Hindi
1991	Jeevlaga	Mahesh Kothare	Marathi
1993	Zapatlela	Mahesh Kothare	Marathi
2004	Pachhadlela	Mahesh Kothare	Marathi
2006	Shubh Mangal Savdhan	Mahesh Kothare	Marathi

== Discography (as a composer) ==
Year	Film	Director	Language	Notes
1976	Aaj Ka Ye Ghar	Surendra Shailaj	Hindi	
1976	Bhagwan Samaye Sansar Mein	Satish Kumar	Hindi	
1977	Naav Motha Lakshan Khota	Murlidhar Kapdi	Marathi	As duo Anil-Arun
1979	Ashtavinayak	Rajdutt	Marathi	As duo Anil-Arun
1981	Are Sansar Sansar	Rajdutt	Marathi	As duo Anil-Arun
1982	Maai Baap	Sachin Pilgaonkar	Marathi	As duo Anil-Arun
1983	Gupchup Gupchup	V. K. Naik	Marathi	As duo Anil-Arun
1984	Navri Mile Navryala	Sachin Pilgaonkar	Marathi	As duo Anil-Arun
1985	Dhum Dhadaka	Mahesh Kothare	Marathi	As duo Anil-Arun
1985	Vahinichi Maya	Kumar Sohoni	Marathi	As duo Anil-Arun
1986	Aaj Jhale Mukt Mi	Rajdutt	Marathi	As duo Anil-Arun
1987	Khatyal Sasu Nathal Soon	N. S. Vaidya	Marathi	
1987	De Danadan	Mahesh Kothare	Marathi	
1987	Chal Re Laxya Mumbaila	Satish Randive	Marathi	
1989	Pheka Pheki	Bipin Varti	Marathi	
1989	Thartharat	Mahesh Kothare	Marathi	
1989	De Dhadak Be Dhadak	Rajiv Barve	Marathi	
1989	Chambu Gabale	Shivdas	Marathi	
1990	Dhadakebaaz	Mahesh Kothare	Marathi	
1991	Jeevlaga	Mahesh Kothare	Marathi	
1991	Maherchi Sadi	Vijay Kondke	Marathi	
1991	Balidan	Raam Shetty	Marathi	
1991	Bandhan	Anant Mane	Marathi	
1991	Shame To Shame	Purushottam Berde	Marathi	
1992	Shubh Mangal Savdhan	M. S. Salvi	Marathi	
1993	Aye Meri Bekhudi	Chanchal Kumar	Hindi	
1993	Waqt Humara Hain	Bharat Rangachary	Hindi	
1993	Zapatlela	Mahesh Kothare	Marathi	
1994	Majha Chakula	Mahesh Kothare	Marathi	
1995	Senani Sane Guruji	Ramesh Deo	Marathi	
1995	Raghuveer	K. Pappu	Marathi	
1998	Dhangad Dhinga	Mahesh Kothare	Marathi	
2004	Tuzhyach Sathi	Shraddha Kumar	Marathi	
2004	He Aapla Asach Chalaycha	V. K. Naik	Marathi	
2004	Pachhadlela	Mahesh Kothare	Marathi	
2006	Shubh Mangal Savdhan	Mahesh Kothare	Marathi	
2009	Mata Ekveera Navsala Pauli	Dinanath Redkar	Marathi	
2009	Vighnaharta Shree Siddhivinayak	Yashwant Ingawale	Marathi	
2009	Chal Love Kar	A. Radhaswamy	Marathi	
