= He Tar Kahich Nay =

Marathi celebrity stand-up comedy show

- Genre: Stand-up comedy
- Directed by: Nilesh Sable
- Starring: Siddhartha Jadhav; Akshaya Deodhar
- Country of origin: India
- Original language: Marathi
- No. of episodes: 26

Production
- Camera setup: Multi-camera
- Running time: 45 minutes

Original release
- Network: Zee Marathi
- Release: 10 December 2021 – 5 March 2022

He Tar Kahich Nay (transl. This is nothing) is an Indian television stand-up comedy show in Marathi language originally aired on Zee Marathi. It was hosted by Akshaya Deodhar. Siddhartha Jadhav was also part of the show as Special Guest. It was directed by Nilesh Sable. It was premiered from 10 December 2021 and ended on 5 March 2022 aired with 26 episodes.

== Concept ==
It is a stand-up comedy show where various celebrities share their day-to-day life experiences on the stage.

== Celebrity Guests ==
- Ramesh Deo
- Prema Kiran
- Sanjay Mone
- Spruha Joshi
- Shashikant Pedwal
- Sushma Shiromani
- Veena Jagtap
