= Jairam Kulkarni =

Indian actor (1932–2020)

- Born: Jairam Kulkarni; 17 October 1932; Barshi, Solapur district, Bombay Presidency
- Died: 17 March 2020 (aged 87); Pune, Maharashtra
- Occupation: Actor
- Years active: 1956–2020
- Spouse: Hema Kulkarni (m. 1962–2020)
- Relatives: Mrinal Kulkarni (daughter-in-law)

Jairam Kulkarni (17 October 1932 – 17 March 2020) was an Indian Marathi-language film actor who worked in several Marathi films, television, and theatre. He is better known for Ashi Hi Banwa Banwi (1988), Maza Pati Karodpati (1988), Aamchya Sarkhe Aamhich (1990) and Zapatlela (1993).

== Early life ==
Kulkarni was born on 17 October 1932, in Ambejavalge, Barshi taluka, Solapur district. After studying at Sulakhe High School, he moved to Pune and joined S P College. During college, he befriended actors Shrikant Moghe and Sharad Talwalkar. Once done with his education, he joined All India Radio's Pune station, working as an assistant to the renowned author Vyankatesh Madgulkar.

Kulkarni began his stage career with the play Jwalet Ubhi Mee, produced by the Progressive Dramatic Association. As film roles started coming his way, he left his job at AIR to pursue acting full-time.

== Personal life ==
Kulkarni has two children named Rupak and Ruchir who is the husband of Marathi and Hindi film and television actress Mrinal Kulkarni.

== Filmography ==
Year	Title	Role	Notes
1976	Ha Khel Sawalyancha	Tangewala	Film debut
1979	Duniya Kari Salaam	Sarpanch	
1982	Mai Baap	Bhima	
1983	Savitri	Desai Kaka	
1983	Sasu Varchad Jawai	Diwanji	
1984	Mumbaicha Faujdar	Mama	
1984	Navri Mile Navryala	Nanasaheb Inamdar	
1984	Savvasher	Jairam	
1984	Streedhan	Appasaheb	
1984	Jugalbandi	Anna	
1984	Lek Chalali Sasarla	Desai Kaka	
1985	Dhum Dhadaka	Nana Jawalkar	
1985	Ardhangi	Bhujangrao	
1986	Tuzya Wachun Karmena	DS Nathu	
1986	Aai Tulja Bhavani	Madhu's Father	
1986	Dhondi Dhondi Pani De	Shridhar Jawalkar	
1986	Maaficha Sakshidar	College Professor	
1986	Mazhe Ghar Mazha Sansar	Balwant Mama	
1986	Khara Varasdar	Malharrao Sarkar	
1986	Dhakti Sun	Ashram's Secretary	
1987	De Danadan	DSP K.R. Doiphode	
1987	Chal Re Laxya Mumbaila	Commissioner	
1987	Gammat Jammat	Gautam's employer	
1987	Kashyasathi Premasathi	Appaji	
1987	Khatyal Sasu Nathal Soon	Shridhar Pant	
1988	Maza Pati Karodpati	Mr. Deshmukh	
1988	Ashi Hi Banwa Banwi	Chhaburao	
1988	Rangat Sangat	Geeta's Father	
1988	Majjach Majja	Robert	
1988	Nashibwan	Mr. Shroff	
1988	Ek Gadi Baaki Anadi	Mr. Saranjame	
1989	Balache Baap Brahmachari	Bapusaheb Aasankar	
1989	Rajane Wajvila Baja	Bhimrao	
1989	Thartharat	Zunjaarrao Ghorpade	
1989	Atmavishwas	Rajendra's Uncle	
1989	Bhutacha Bhau	Rao Saheb	
1989	Gavran Gangu	Ganga's Father	
1989	Navra Baiko	Ashok's Father	
1989	Dharla Tar Chavtay	Mr. Inamdar	
1989	De Dhadak Be Dhadak	Inspector N.K Dongre	
1990	Godi Gulabi	Himself	Special appearance
1990	Aamchyasarkhe Aamhich	Diwanji	
1990	Rickshawali	Sujata's Father	
1990	Dhumakool	Mr. Pradhan	
1990	Eka Peksha Ek	Commissioner Ramdas Phutane	
1991	Aayatya Gharat Gharoba	Sakharam	
1991	Bandal Baaz	Commissioner	
1992	Prem Deewane	Letter Giver	Cameo appearance
1992	Zunj Tujhi Majhi	Vishnu Chavan	
1992	Aaplee Maanse	Mr. Dongre	
1992	Anuradha	Appasaheb	
1992	Vaat Pahate Punvechi	Mr. Manorkar	
1992	Gruhpravesh	Mama	
1992	Hach Sunbaicha Bhau	Tatya	
1993	Zapatlela	Superintendent Jairam Ghatge	
1994	Bajrangachi Kamal	DSP Pradhan	
1994	Maza Saubhagya	Bapu	
1994	Sasar Maher	Shirpati Patil	
1994	Kunku	Nanasaheb	
1994	Hirwa Chuda Suwasinicha	Dinkar	
1995	Jamla Ho Jamla	Mr. Tenkshe	
2002	Aadhar	Vasantrao Deshmukh	
2003	Mala Jagaychay	Ajay's Father	
2004	Ranragini	Joshi Kaka	
2020	Khel Ayushyacha	Aajoba	

== Death ==
Kulkarni died on 17 March 2020 in Pune, Maharashtra due to heart failure. He was survived by his wife Hema Kulkarni, sons Rupak and Ruchir Kulkarni, and daughter-in-law Mrinal Kulkarni. Many celebrities like Ashok Saraf and Sachin Pilgaonkar mourned this great loss.

== See also ==
- Marathi cinema
