= Kavathe-Mahankal =

Kavathe Mahankal
- City
- Location in Maharashtra, India
- Coordinates: 17°00′22.6728″N 74°51′55.3392″E
- Country: India
- State: Maharashtra
- District: Sangli

Government
  - Type: Nagar panchayat
  - Body: Municipal Council of Kavathe Mahankal
- Elevation: 636 m (2,087 ft)

Population (2011)
  - Total: 17,390

Languages
  - Official: Marathi
- Time zone: UTC+5:30 (IST)
- PIN: 416405
- Telephone code: 02341
- Vehicle registration: MH 10,MH 59
- Nearest city: Miraj
- Lok Sabha representative: Vishal Patil
- Vidhan Sabha representative: Rohit Patil
- Website: http://sangli.nic.in/

Kavathe-Mahankal is a tehsil in Miraj subdivision of Sangli district in the Indian state of Maharashtra. This is famous for Mahankali Devi temple and Mallikarjun (God Shiva) temple. There was also a sugar factory, named after the same Goddess Mahankali sugar factory.

== Demography ==
Kavathe Mahankal city is the headquarter of Kavathe Mahankal taluka of Sangli district, Maharashtra, with total 3733 families residing. The population of Kavathe Mahankal city as per 2011 census of India is as follows:

- Male – 8849
- Female –8541
- Total – 17390

K. Mahankal city has population of 1902 children with age 0–6 which makes up 10.94% of total population of city. Average Sex Ratio of Kavathe Mahankal city is 965 which is higher than Maharashtra state average of 929. Child Sex Ratio for the Kavathe Mahankal as per census is 894, equal to that of Maharashtra average of 894.

Kavathe Mahankal city has higher literacy rate compared to Maharashtra. In 2011, literacy rate of Kavathe Mahankal was 87.28% compared to 82.34% that of Maharashtra. In Kavathe Mahankal, Male literacy stands at 92.30% while female literacy rate stands at 82.13%.

== Important places ==
=== Tourist spots and culture ===
Being a region with mainly dry and arid climate, Kavathe Mahankal is a perfect habitat for goats, and sheep, known for the meat of billy goats.

Dhangari Ovya (धनगरी ओव्या), is a song form by dhangar caste.

Gajinrity (गजीनृत्य) is a famous dance form of the area

Kavathe Mahankal is one of the most drought prone areas of Maharashtra. But still it has a sugar factory.

=== Educational Institutes ===
- New english school, I
- Shrimati Sajabai Raghunathrao Shinde Sarkar Highschool, Malangaon
- Mahankali Vidyaniketan (Sugar Factory Campus)
- Shree Mahankali High School
- Kanya Prashala & Jr. college for girls
- Nootan International School
- Nootan College of Pharmacy
- S.S.D.Ed college K. Mahankal
- Ambika D.Ed college K. Mahankal
- Industrial Training Institute
- Chinguaai Institute of Nursing Education
- Zilha Parishad Shala Haroli Tal- K Mahankal
- PVP college of Arts, Commerce & Science, Kavathe Mahankal
- YCMOU Learning centre at PVP college Kavathe Mahankal (Open Schooling)
- Gyan Bharti Shikshan Sanstha - Boys' and Girls highschool kavathe mahankal
- Bhagirathiaai English Medium School Shirdhon
- Sushila Vitthal Kadam Secondary English Medium School Shirdhon
- Mahankali Vidyaniketan L, KJVATHEtan c Kavathe M
- Dya's KILBIL Shishuvihar, IDEAL PUBLIC School, Adarsha Vidyaniketan

=== Other Important Places/ Govt. Organisations ===
- Kavathe Mahankal has Military Canteen for Pune Sub Area
- Tehsil Magistrate Court
- State Transport Depot
- Kavathe Mahankal Railway Station (Central Railway)
- Police Station
- Aadhar Hatcheries Borgaon
- Government Rural Hospital

== Transportation ==
- District HQ Sangli is 45 km by road - State Highway
- State HQ Mumbai is 400 km by road - State Highway + National Highway via Pune
- Solapur City is 150 km via State Highway
- Pandharpur City 100 km by road
- Coastal City Malvan is 250 km via Kolhapur, by road
- Nearest junction Miraj is 40 km by Road
- Nearest railway station Kavathe Mahankal is just 10 km

== In popular culture ==
Kavtya Mahakal, a fictional character and antagonist in 1990 Marathi action comedy film Dhadakebaaz is named after the village Kavathe Mahankal.
