= Nivedita Saraf =

Indian actress

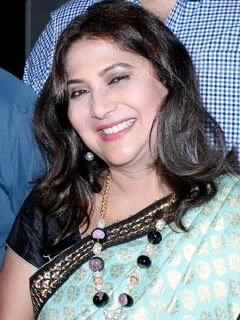
- Nivedita Saraf in 2015
- Born: Nivedita Joshi; 11 April 1963 (age 63); Bombay, Maharashtra
- Occupation: Actress
- Years active: 1977–present
- Spouse: Ashok Saraf (m. 1990)
- Children: 1
- Family: Joshi–Saraf family

Nivedita Saraf (née Joshi; born 11 April 1963) is an Indian film, television and theatre actress known for her work primarily in Marathi, as well as in Hindi films. She has established herself as a prominent figure in Marathi cinema and television, widely recognised for her versatile performances and impactful contribution to the industry.

Saraf began her acting career at the age of 10 on stage and made her film debut as a child actor in the Hindi film Apnapan (1977). She gained recognition in Marathi cinema with her first leading role in Navri Mile Navryala (1984), alongside her future husband, Ashok Saraf. Her subsequent films, including Dhum Dhadaka (1985), Kashasathi Premasathi (1987), and Ashi Hi Banwa Banwi (1988), established her name as the industry's leading actress. Her performances in De Danadan (1987), Thartharat (1989), and Pheka Pheki (1989) proved her comedic timing and contributed to the success of Marathi films in the 1980s.

Saraf also appeared in Hindi films such as Narsimha (1991) and King Uncle (1993). Her role in Majha Chakula (1994), portraying a mother whose son is kidnapped, earned critical acclaim and marked her last major film before a hiatus. She returned to acting in the Marathi serial Bandhan (2006) and later made a comeback to films with Aata Ga Baya (2011) and Deool Band (2015).

In recent years, Saraf has gained popularity for her television roles, including Asawari in the hit Marathi serials Aggabai Sasubai (2019–2021) and its spin-off Aggabai Sunbai. She also portrayed Ratnamala Mohite in Bhagya Dile Tu Mala (2022–2024) and currently stars as Shubha Killedar in Aai Ani Baba Retire Hot Aahet.

== Early life ==
Joshi was born on 11 April 1963 in a family of actors. Her father Gajanan Joshi acted in many Marathi films of early 1970s. Her mother was a stage actress Vimal Joshi from the same era.

== Career ==
Joshi began her acting career on the stage at the age of 10. She made her film debut as a child actor in J. Om Prakash's Hindi drama film Apnapan, where she played the role of a beggar alongside Sudhir Dalvi. The song Aadmi Musafir Hai, sung by Lata Mangeshkar and Mohammed Rafi, was picturised on them. Subsequently, she featured in a few more Hindi films as a child actor, where she was credited as Baby Nivedita Joshi.

In 1984, Joshi landed her first leading role in the Marathi family drama film Navri Mile Navryala, directed by Sachin Pilgaonkar, where she acted for the first time alongside her future husband Ashok Saraf as a sister. The film was a huge commercial success. The same year, she also acted in Gharcha Bhedi.

In 1985, she was seen in brief roles in the films: Ardhangi, Paisa Yeh Paisa, and Uske Baad. Her leading role of the year was Mahesh Kothare's directorial debut, Dhum Dhadaka. It starred Kothare, Ashok, Laxmikant Berde, and Prema Kiran. The film was a remake of the 1964 Tamil film Kadhalikka Neramillai. After its release, it became a box office hit and was a trendsetter, which brought young audiences to recognise the Marathi style of movie-making.

Next, she played a college going girl in Kashasathi Premasathi (1987), opposite Ajinkya Deo. The song Bhannat Ranwara from the film was a chartbuster. Her biggest hit of 1987 was Kothare's action comedy De Danadan, which was inspired by the 1980 Hollywood film Super Fuzz.

In 1988, she once again collaborated with Pilgaonkar for the comedy drama film Ashi Hi Banwa Banwi. Joshi played love interest from Miraj of Shantanu (played by Siddharth Ray), along with an ensemble cast of Pilgaonkar, Ashok, Supriya Pilgaonkar, Berde, Ashwini Bhave, and Priya Arun. The film was a major box office success for Marathi films in the 1980s and achieved cult classic status among Marathi audiences. Next, she starred in Marathi romantic dramas Kiss Bai Kiss and Gholat Ghol, both featuring Bhave and Berde, which were hits at the box office. The former was based on love triangle, which was also remade in Hindi as Honeymoon (1992). Her final film of that year was Mamla Porincha, a remake of the American film 9 to 5 (1980) about a womanising boss who has a bad eye on his female employees, fed up with him, they decide to teach him a lesson.

In 1989, Joshi played the main lead role of a journalist of the daily newspaper Apradh who falls in love with a CID Inspector (portrayed by Kothare) in his directorial action comedy Thartharat. The film was huge box-office success of that year. Her next releases were the comedy dramas Balache Baap Brahmachari, De Dhadak Be Dhadak and Pheka Pheki. The lattermost was remade in Hindi as Golmaal Returns (2008).

In 1990, she played a supporting role in the crime drama Aamchyasarkhe Aamhich. Next, she starred in the drama film Tuzhi Mazhi Jamli Jodi, which revolves around two girl-friends whose marriage gets fixed at the same time, and one has to go through troubles due to which their friendship is effected. The next releases were Dhamal Bablya Ganpyachi and Changu Mangu. All four films featured her husband, Ashok.

Following these years, she was also part of the Hindi films Narsimha (1991) and King Uncle (1993). After a two-years gap from Marathi films, she starred in Tu Sukhkarta (1993), where she portrayed a woman who has devoted her life to spirituality and intends not to get married.

In 1994, she played the mother of a young boy who is kidnapped by robbers in Kothare's drama film Majha Chakula. Her performance and the film were critically and commercially successful. This film also marked Joshi and Kothare's fourth and last collaboration together. Majha Chakula was the last film she shot before her maternity break, but Dhamaal Jodi (1995) was released later.

Joshi's only appearance during her break was in the 2006 Marathi serial Bandhan, which aired on Zee Marathi. She made her comeback to films after 15 years, with the 2011 film Aata Ga Baya, in which she was seen in a negative role. Her last feature in the film was Deool Band.

Joshi has played Asawari in the Marathi-language serial Aggabai Sasubai on Zee Marathi from 2019 to 2021, a role she reprised in the spin-off Aggabai Sunbai. She played a role in Colors Marathi's Bhagya Dile Tu Mala from 2022 to 2024 as Ratnamala Mohite. Currently, she is playing the role of Shubha Killedar in Star Pravah's Aai Ani Baba Retire Hot Aahet.

== Personal life ==
Nivedita married actor Ashok Saraf on 27 June 1990 at the Shri Mangeshi Temple in Goa. The couple first worked together in the Marathi film Navri Mile Navryala (1984), and their professional association eventually developed into a relationship. They have a son named Aniket Saraf who is a chef.

== Filmography ==
=== Films ===
Year	Title	Role	Language	Notes	Ref.
1977	Apnapan	Beggar	Hindi	Child Artist	
1978	Jalan	Nivedita	Hindi	Child Artist	
1980	Parivartan	Nivedita	Hindi	Child Artist	
1984	Navri Mile Navryala	Kaladevi Inamdar	Marathi	First Lead Role	
1984	Gharcha Bhedi	Aarti Joshi	Marathi		
1985	Dhum Dhadaka	Gauri Wakade	Marathi		
1985	Paisa Yeh Paisa	Rekha	Hindi		
1985	Ardhangi	Namaa	Hindi		
1985	Uske Baad	Kalyani	Hindi		
1986	Naval Katha		Marathi		
1986	Tu Saubhagyavati Ho	Sumitra	Marathi		
1987	Naam O Nishan	Chutki Singh	Hindi		
1987	Marte Dam Tak	Rajni Mathur	Hindi		
1987	Kashasathi Premasathi	Tanuja Sardeshmukh (Tanu)	Marathi		
1987	Irasaal Karti	Chameli	Marathi		
1987	De Danadan	Gauri Dhoipode	Marathi		
1988	Ashi Hi Banwa Banwi	Sushma	Marathi		
1988	Ghar Mein Ram Gali Mein Shyam	Kamla	Hindi		
1988	Kiss Bai Kiss	Archana	Marathi		
1988	Pyaar Mohabbat		Hindi		
1988	Mere Baad		Hindi		
1988	Sarvashrestha	Madhuri	Hindi		
1988	Gholat Ghol	Kavita	Marathi		
1988	Mamla Porincha	Nanda	Marathi		
1988	Afsar		Hindi		
1989	Thartharat	Uma Desai	Marathi		
1989	Balache Baap Brahmachari	Meenakshi Aasankar	Marathi		
1989	Jaaydaad	Rajesh's sister	Hindi		
1989	Pheka Pheki	Rekha Phadke	Marathi		
1989	De Dhadak Be Dhadak	Mona	Marathi		
1990	Tuzhi Mazhi Jamli Jodi	Priya	Marathi		
1990	Dhamal Bablya Ganpyachi	Manisha	Marathi		
1990	Lapwa Chhapwi	Radha Krishna	Marathi		
1990	Amchyasarkhe Aamhich	Champa Joshi	Marathi		
1990	Changu Mangu	Sheela Khatle	Marathi		
1991	Narsimha	Seema	Hindi		
1992	Naseebwaala	Sheela	Hindi		
1993	King Uncle	Sunita	Hindi		
1993	Tu Sukhakarta	Varsha	Marathi		
1994	Majha Chakula	Yashoda	Marathi	Nominated Filmfare Award for Best Actress – Marathi	
1995	Dhamaal Jodi	Neha	Marathi		
1996	Balgobin Bhagat		Marathi		
1999	Sar Ankhon Par	Radha	Hindi		
2008	Mohini	Lavani dancer	Marathi	Cameo appearance in the Song "Aaicha Sangava Aala Re"	
2009	Savitrichya Leki		Marathi		
2011	Aata Ga Baya	Manee's stepmother	Marathi		
2013	We Are On! Houn Jau Dya	Age housing society member	Marathi		
2015	Deool Band	Rukmini Shastri	Marathi		
2025	Sangeet Manapmaan	Rani Sarkar VijayLaxmi	Marathi		
2025	Fussclass Dabhade	Sulochana Dabhade	Marathi		
2025	Bin Lagnachi Goshta	Uma	Marathi		

=== Television ===
Year	Title	Role	Language	Notes	Ref.
1984	Yeh Jo Hai Zindagi	Raja's wife	Hindi	Television debut	
1990	Bhikaji Rao Karodpati	Bhikaji's wife	Marathi		
2000	Don't Worry Ho Jayega		Hindi	As producer	
2004-2005	Bandhan	Padmini	Marathi		
2010-2012	Sapno Se Bhare Naina	Naina's mother	Hindi		
2015	Phir Bhi Na Maane...Badtameez Dil	Suman Purohit	Hindi		
2016-2017	Duheri	Dushyant's mother	Marathi		
2019	Kesari Nandan	Bhakti Singh (Dadi Sa)	Hindi		
2019-2021	Aggabai Sasubai	Asavari Kulkarni / Asavari Raje	Marathi		
2021	Aggabai Sunbai	Asavari Raje	Marathi		
2022–2024	Bhagya Dile Tu Mala	Ratnamala Mohite	Marathi		
2024–2025	Aai Ani Baba Retire Hot Aahet!	Shubhangi "Shubha" Killedar	Marathi		
2025–2026	Ashok MaMa	Nivedita	Marathi		
2026–present	Krushnaichya Leki	Krushnai	Marathi		

=== Plays ===
- Tilak–Agarkar
- Akhercha Sawaal
- Premachya Gava Jave
- Shrimant
- Tujhya-Mazyat
- Cottage No. 54
- Hasat Khelat
- Vahato Hi Durvanchi Judi
- Vegla Vhayachay Mala
- Sangeet Sanshaykallol
- Wada Chirebandi
- Magna Talyakathi
- Mi, Swara Aani Te Dogha

=== Web-series ===
Year	Title	Role	Language	Ref.
2022	Athanga	Aau	Marathi	
2023	Duranga 2	Gayatri Jaykar	Hindi	

== Accolades ==
Year	Awards	Category	Work	Result	Ref.
1990	Maharashtra State Film Awards	Best Actress	Tujhi Majhi Jamli Jodi	Won	
2004	Zee Marathi Utsav Natyancha Awards	Best Actress	Bandhan	Nominated	
2004	Zee Marathi Utsav Natyancha Awards	Best Couple	Bandhan	Won	
2009	Zee Chitra Gaurav Puraskar	Best Actress	Savitrichya Leki	Nominated	
2019	Zee Marathi Utsav Natyancha Awards	Best Mother	Aggabai Sasubai	Won	
2019	Zee Marathi Utsav Natyancha Awards	Best Mother-in-law	Aggabai Sasubai	Won	
2019	Zee Marathi Utsav Natyancha Awards	Best Daughter-in-law	Aggabai Sasubai	Won	
2019	Zee Marathi Utsav Natyancha Awards	Best Couple	Aggabai Sasubai	Won	
2021	Zee Marathi Utsav Natyancha Awards	Best Mother-in-law	Aggabai Sasubai	Won	
2023	Colors Marathi Awards 2023	Best Mother	Bhagya Dile Tu Mala	Won	
2023	Navarashtra Planet Marathi Film and OTT Award	Best Supporting Actress – OTT	Athanga	Won	
2025	Star Pravah Parivar Puraskar	Best Mother	Aai Aani Baba Retire Hot Aahet	Won	
2025	Zee Chitra Gaurav Puraskar	Lifetime Achievement Award	—N/a	Honoured	
2025	Gandhar Gaurav Award	Contribution in the field of Arts	—N/a	Honoured	
2025	Suvichar Gaurav Award	Contribution in the field of Arts	—N/a	Honoured	
