= De Danadan =

1987 Indian film

- Official film poster
- Directed by: Mahesh Kothare
- Written by: Annasaheb Deulgaonkar
- Produced by: Mahesh Kothare
- Starring: Mahesh Kothare; Laxmikant Berde; Nivedita Joshi Saraf; Prema Kiran; Jairam Kulkarni; Deepak Shirke; Ambar Kothare
- Cinematography: Suryakant Lavande
- Edited by: N. S. Vaidya
- Music by: Anil Mohile
- Production company: Jenma Films International
- Release date: 1 January 1987 (Maharashtra)
- Running time: 120 minutes
- Country: India
- Language: Marathi
- Budget: ₹12 lakh
- Box office: ₹60 Lakh

De Danadan (transl. Hit Left and Right) is a 1987 Indian Marathi-language action comedy film directed and produced by Mahesh Kothare under the banner of Jenma Films International. The film stars Laxmikant Berde, Mahesh Kothare, Nivedita Joshi, Prema Kiran, Jairam Kulkarni, Deepak Shirke and Ambar Kothare.

== Plot ==
Sub-Inspector Mahesh Danke (Mahesh Kothare) and Constable Lakshman Tangmode alias Lakshya (Laxmikant Berde) are cousin brothers who leave their village and move to the village of Shrirangpur, Maharashtra to work as police officers. Their senior DSP Dhoipode (Jairam Kulkarni) is friends with a rich man named Raobahadur Vatlaave (Ambar Kothare), who is famous for his kindness and helpfulness. Mahesh falls in love with Dhoipode's daughter Gauri (Nivedita Joshi) while Lakshya finds himself falling for his neighbour Aavdakka (Prema Kiran).

The government of Shrirangpur is carrying out an atomic research testing in a deserted area. However, Mahesh accidentally sends Lakshya to the same place for an important task on the day of the experiment. After being reminded by Dhoipode, Mahesh tries to contact Lakshya who ignorantly throws his walkie-talkie away as it stops working. While returning from the place, the explosion takes place but Lakshya miraculously survives and receives extraordinary superpowers due to this incident.

Along with Mahesh, he decides to find out the criminal root in Shrirangpur by using this boon granted by Lord Hanuman. However, all the superpowers of Lakshya fail when he sees the red colour. Also, Vatlaave agrees to help them in taking down all the criminals. Together, Lakshya and Mahesh unfold the mystery of the Shrirangpur crime monitored by a dacoit named Dagdya Ramoshi (Deepak Shirke), and one of the police officers Inspector Kale (Prakash Phadtare) is involved with the criminals as well.

Eventually, Lakshya and Mahesh discover that the crime lord whom the middlemen Dagdya and Kale are reporting to is Vatlaave himself who is serving as the highest source of crime in Shrirangpur. The duo search for evidences at Vatlaave's warehouse but their plan backfires as Vatlaave and Kale accuse them of being corrupt before Dhoipode. This provokes Dhoipode into arresting Lakshya and Mahesh and sending them to prison. Both Lakshya and Mahesh's mothers and their village headman arrive in Shrirangpur after learning about the duo's arrest.

Along with Aavdakka and her father, they approach Vatlaave to request him to have Lakshya and Mahesh released from prison. While there, Aavdakka reveals the truth of Lakshya's superpowers and their weakness to Vatlaave, unbeknownst of his true identity. Vatlaave slyly has Dagdya abduct Lakshya and Mahesh's mothers, their village headman, Aavdakka and her father and hold them all captive at their hideout. In prison, Lakshya and Mahesh are approached by Vatlaave's henchman who reveals them about the capture of their loved ones.

Upon learning this, Lakshya and Mahesh are forced to escape from prison and Lakshya uses his super-speed to catch up to Vatlaave's car, but is interrupted by the red colour. Rescued and joined by Mahesh, Lakshya arrives on time at the hideout to save their loved ones and overpowers all the criminals before calling in Dhoipode and the police to the scene. As a result, Vatlaave, Dagdya, Kale and the gang members are arrested and sent to prison for their crimes, while Lakshya and Mahesh's marriages are fixed with Aavdakka and Gauri, respectively.

== Cast ==
- Mahesh Kothare as Sub-Inspector Mahesh Danke
- Laxmikant Berde as Constable Lakshman Tangmode a.k.a. Lakshya
- Nivedita Joshi as Gauri Dhoipode
- Prema Kiran as Aavdakka
- Jairam Kulkarni as DSP K.R. Dhoipode
- Deepak Shirke as Zhagdya Ramoshi
- Ambar Kothare as Raobahadur Bapusaheb Vatlaave
- Prakash Phadtare as Inspector G.R. Kale
- Shanta Inamdar as Parubai Tangmode (Lakshya's mother)
- Saroj Sukhtankar as Gopikabai Danke (Mahesh's mother)
- Bapusaheb Gavde as Tonage Ustaad (headman of Lakshya and Mahesh's village)
- Bipin Varti as Gundappa Daku (dacoit in Lakshya's nightmare)
- Vijay Kadam as Newsreader on TV
- Ashok Pahelwan as Dagdya's henchman
