= Bandiwan Mi Ya Sansari =

Bandiwan Mi Ya Sansari - Marathi Movie
- Theatrical release poster
- Directed by: Arun Karnataki
- Produced by: Prakash Joshi
- Starring: Asha Kale; Nilu Phule; Lata Arun; Leela Gandhi; Mohan Kotiwan; Vasant Shinde; Maya Jadhav
- Music by: Vishwanath More
- Release date: 30 December 1988
- Country: India
- Language: Marathi

Bandiwan Mi Ya Sansari is a Marathi movie released on 30 December 1988. The movie has been produced by Prakash Joshi and directed by Arun Karnataki.

== Cast ==
The cast includes, Asha Kale, Nilu Phule, Lata Arun, Leela Gandhi, Mohan Kotiwan, Vasant Shinde, Maya Jadhav and others.

== Soundtrack ==
The music is directed by Vishwanath More.

=== Track listing ===
No.	Title	Performer(s)	Length
1.	"Saavaj Gavana"	Asha Bhosle	3:22
2.	"Vegalya Jagat Ya"	Asha Bhosle, Suresh Wadkar	4:27
