= Bipin Varti =

Indian actor

- Education: Elphinstone College
- Occupations: Actor; director
- Years active: 1982–1995
- Known for: Zapatlela
- Spouse: Shamal Varti
- Relatives: Sachin Pilgaonkar (cousin)

Bipin Varti (died. 1995) was an Indian film actor, director and producer appeared in Marathi and some Hindi films. Varti directed the films Pheka Pheki (remade in Hindi as Golmaal Returns directed by Rohit Shetty), Changu Mangu, Ek Gadi Baki Anadi, Doctor Doctor and acted 90's famous Marathi films like Dhadakebaaz (1990), Zapatlela (1993), De Danadan (1987), Majha Chakula (1994), Dhum Dhadaka (1985) under the direction of Mahesh Kothare. He is a cousin of Sachin Pilgaonkar.

== Filmography ==
=== As an actor ===
Year	Title	Role	Notes
1982	Mai Baap	Vinod	
1984	Sage Soyare	Vikram Jagirdar	
1985	Dhum Dhadaka	Rabbar Singh	
1986	Maaficha Sakshidar	Rakesh (Rocky)	
1986	Khara Varasdar	Himself	Cameo appearance
1987	De Danadan	Gundappa Daku	
1987	Gammat Jammat	Gotya	
1988	Ashi Hi Banwa Banwi	Police Inspector	Special appearance
1988	Ek Gadi Baki Aaadi	Usman Bhai (Taxi Driver)	Also director
1989	Atmavishwas	Mr. Raikar	
1989	Bhutacha Bhau	Tony	Special appearance
1990	Dhadakebaaz	Divtya/ Kavtya Mahakal	Negative role
1990	Aamchyasarkhe Aamhich	Balu Pahelwan	
1990	Changu Mangu	Michael	Also director
1990	Eka Peksha Ek	Photographer	Special appearance
1991	Aayatya Gharat Gharoba	Partner of Kashiram	Cameo appearance
1992	Prem Deewane	Pedro's Friend	Guest appearance
1993	Zapatlela	Divtya/Kubdya Khavis	Supporting role
1994	Majha Chakula	Gidhad	
1995	Jamla Ho Jamla	Namya	

=== As a director ===
Year	Title	Language	Notes
1988	Ek Gadi Baaki Anadi	Marathi	Debut
1989	Pheka Pheki	Marathi	
1990	Changu Mangu	Marathi	
1991	Doctor Doctor	Marathi	Last film
