= Thartharat =

1989 Indian film

- DVD cover
- Directed by: Mahesh Kothare
- Written by: Shivaram Gorle (Dialogue)
- Screenplay by: Vasant Sathe; Mahesh Kothare
- Story by: Mahesh Kothare
- Produced by: Arvind Samant
- Starring: Mahesh Kothare; Laxmikant Berde; Nivedita Joshi; Priya Arun; Deepak Shirke; Jairam Kulkarni; Rahul Solapurkar
- Cinematography: Suryakant Lavande
- Edited by: Vishwas–Anil
- Music by: Anil Mohile
- Production company: Shree Ashtavinayak Chitra
- Release date: 1 January 1989
- Running time: 138 minutes
- Country: India
- Language: Marathi
- Budget: ₹20 lakh
- Box office: ₹80 lakh

Thartharat (transl. Tremble) is a 1989 Indian Marathi-language action comedy film co-written and directed by Mahesh Kothare and produced by Arvind Samant. The film stars Mahesh Kothare, Laxmikant Berde, Nivedita Joshi, Priya Arun, Deepak Shirke, Jairam Kulkarni and Rahul Solapurkar. The music was composed by Anil Mohile.

== Plot ==
Zunjaar Rao Ghorpade (Jairam Kulkarni) runs a newspaper called Zunjaar, but it's not doing well. He hopes his son Lakshya (Laxmikant Berde) will help, but Lakshya spends more time with his girlfriend Gange (Priya Arun). In a desperate move, Lakshya publishes a fake story about a dacoit, Taklu Haiwan (Rahul Solapurkar), coming to their village. This boosts their newspaper sales but also creates fear in the village. Uma (Nivedita Joshi), who works for a rival paper called Apradh, comes to cover the news. As panic spreads, Inspector Mahesh Jadhav (Mahesh Kothare) is transferred to handle the situation.

The problem gets real when Taklu Haiwan and his gang actually arrive in the village. Now faced with a genuine threat, Lakshya and Inspector Mahesh must set aside their differences, team up, and devise a plan to protect their village from the looming danger posed by Taklu Haiwan and his gang.

== Cast ==
- Mahesh Kothare as CID Inspector Mahesh Jadhav
- Laxmikant Berde as Laxmikant Ghorpade (a.k.a. Lakshya)
- Nivedita Joshi as Uma Desai
- Priya Arun as Ganga
- Deepak Shirke as Constable 100 (Ganga's father)
- Jairam Kulkarni as Zunjaarrao Ghorpade (Lakshya's father)
- Rahul Solapurkar as Taklu Haiwan
- Bhalchandra Kulkarni as Sarpanch Kavale
- Prakash Phadtare as Inspector Tonage
- Ravindra Berde as Editor of Apradh (Uma's employer)
- Ashok Pahelwan as Taklu Haiwan's henchman
- Kishore Nandlaskar as Guest in Shrirangpur
- Ambar Kothare as Mumbai Police Commissioner (Mahesh's employer)

== Production ==
=== Casting ===
The film marks Mahesh and Laxmikant Berde's third collaboration, with Nivedita Joshi joining Kothare once more after Dhum Dhadaka and De Dana Dan. Priya Arun steps into the role of Ganga, while Rahul Solapurkar takes on the character of Taklu Haiwan following an invitation from Annasaheb Deulgaonkar.

== Soundtrack ==
Thartharat

Soundtrack album by Anil Mohile
- Released: 1989
- Genre: Feature film soundtrack
- Length: 19:51
- Language: Marathi
- Label: Ishtar Music

Official audio
- Thartharat - Full Album on YouTube

The music is composed by Anil Mohile and lyrics by Pravin Danve.

=== Track listing ===
No.	Title	Singer (s)	Length
1.	"Rani Ga Gangu Ga"	Anand Shinde, Jyotsna Hardikar	2:51
2.	"Ganpati Bappa Morya"	Suresh Wadkar, Usha Mangeshkar, Anand Shinde, Jyotsna Hardikar	3:22
3.	"Chikiri Buboom"	Usha Mangeshkar, Amit Kumar	3:37
4.	"Sutlaay Ga Thartharat"	Anupama Deshpande, Sudesh Bhosle, Anand Shinde, Vinay Mandke	8:00
Total length:			19:51

== Release and box office ==
Upon its theatrical release in 1989, It was a major commercial success and emerged as a box office blockbuster. The film achieved a "Golden Jubilee" milestone by completing a continuous 50-week theatrical run in cinema halls across Maharashtra. It eventually grossed over ₹80 lakh during its entire theatrical run.
