= Prema Kiran =

Indian actress (1961–2022)

- Kiran in 2022
- Born: 1961
- Died: 1 May 2022 (aged 61); Mumbai, Maharashtra, India
- Occupation: Actress
- Years active: 1985–2022
- Known for: Dhoom Dhadaka (1985); De Dana Dan (1986)

Prema Kiran (1961 – 1 May 2022) was an Indian film actress and producer who mainly worked in Marathi cinema. Prema Kiran was known for role Ambakka in 1985 Marathi language film Dhoom Dhadaka, She also works in De Danadan (1987), Utavala Navra (1989), Madness (2001), Arjun Deva (2001), Kunku Jhale Vairi (2005). In the last few years Prema appeared on Zee Marathi Channel's program He Tar Kahich Nay.

== Career ==
Kiran was started her film career with the 1985 Marathi movie Dhoom Dhadaka. Later, she played lead roles in De Danadan, Irsal Karti, Pagalpan, Arjun Deva, Kunku Jhale Vairi and Lagnachi Varaat Londonachya Gharat. Also Mahercha Aher, Gadbad Ghotala, Saubhagyavati Sarpanch are among his films.

Along with acting, Prema Kiran has also produced films like Uthavala Navara (1989), Tharkaap. Apart from this, she also acted in Gujarati, Bhojpuri, Awadhi and Banjara language films.

== Filmography ==
| Year | Film | role | Language | Notes | Ref. |
|---|---|---|---|---|---|
| 1985 | Dhum Dhadaka | Ambakka Rede | Marathi | | |
| 1986 | Gadbad Ghotala | Chitra | Marathi | | |
| 1987 | De Dana Dan | Aavdakaa | Marathi | | |
| 1987 | Chhakke Panje | Maya | Marathi | | |
| 1987 | Bhatak Bhavani | Kondiba's wife | Marathi | | |
| 1987 | Kaltay Pan Valat Nahi | Prema | Marathi | | |
| 1987 | Kashasathi Premasathi | Phulwa | Marathi | | |
| 1987 | Irasaal Karti | Sundari | Marathi | | |
| 1987 | Khatyal Sasu Nataal Navra | Manju | Marathi | | |
| 1989 | Hum Intezar Karenge | Savitri | Hindi | Hindi film | |
| 1989 | Gavran Gangu | Gangu | Marathi | | |
| 1993 | Maheracha Aher | Jyoti Deshmukh | Marathi | | |
| 1995 | Hirwa Chauda Suwasanicha | Mira | Marathi | Tv Film | |
| 1999 | Saubhagyawati Sarpanch | Prema | Marathi | | |
| 2000 | Tuch Majhi Bhagyalakshmi | Ranjana Yashwantrao Patil | Marathi | | |
| 2000 | Tochi Ek Samrat | Widower | Marathi | | |
| 2001 | Paagalpan | Macchiwali (Fisher lady) | Marathi | | |
| 2001 | Boond | | Marathi | | |
| 2001 | Arjun Deva | | Marathi | | |
| 2004 | Ata Lagnala Chala | | Marathi | | |
| 2004 | Chatur Navara Chikni Baiko | Mother of Raja | Marathi | | |
| 2005 | Me Tulas Tujhya Angani | Sasubai | Marathi | | |
| 2006 | Kunku Jhale Vairi | | Marathi | | |
| 2006 | Pahili Sher, Dusri Savvasher, Navara Pavsher | Saku | Marathi | | |
| 2006 | Lalbaugcha Raja | | Marathi | | |
| 2007 | Honar Sun Mi Tya Gharachi | Aaisaheb | Marathi | | |
| 2008 | Saasar Majhe He Mandir | Aaisaheb | Marathi | | |
| 2008 | Full 3 Dhamaal | Traveller | Marathi | | |
| 2008 | Mahima Khandobacha | | Marathi | | |
| 2009 | Vairi Mangalsutracha | Laxmi Shriraman | Marathi | | |
| 2009 | Lagnachi Varat Londonchya Gharat | | Marathi | | |
| 2010 | Ek Dav Sattecha | | Marathi | | |
| 2010 | Kalubai Bhakt Satyacha Dhavjee Patil | | Marathi | | |
| 2011 | Tambayacha Vishnubala | | Marathi | | |
| 2011 | Chandrapurchi Devi Mahakali | | Marathi | | |
| 2013 | Vishesh Mhanje Hi Majhi Misses | | Marathi | | |
| 2014 | Ghungarachya Nadat | | Marathi | | |
| 2017 | Gaon Thor Pudhari Chor | Parvatibai Teltumbe | Marathi | | |
| 2017 | Premache Nate | | Marathi | | |
| 2017 | Wakya | | Marathi | | |
| 2017 | Sasuchya Gharat Javyachi Varaat | | Marathi | | |
| 2018 | AA BB KK | Indu Mavshi | Marathi | | |
| 2018 | Friendship Band | | Marathi | | |
| 2018 | Bal Bhimrao | | Marathi | | |
| 2018 | Truckbhar Swapna | Lady in slumdog | Marathi | | |
| 2018 | Win Marathon | Aaliya's Mother | Hindi | | |
| 2018 | Aai Chi Saath Kari Jagyavar Maath | | Marathi | | |
| 2018 | Valan | | Marathi | | |
| 2020 | Khel Ayushyacha | | Marathi | | |
| 2021 | Lockdown to Unlock | | Hindi | | |
| 2022 | Story of Laagir | | Marathi | | |

== Death ==
Prema Kiran died in the early hours of May 1, 2022 in Mumbai due to a heart attack aged 61.
