= Dhadakebaaz =

1990 Marathi-language film by Mahesh Kothare

- Theatrical release poster
- Directed by: Mahesh Kothare
- Written by: Purushottam Berde (Dialogue)
- Screenplay by: Mahesh Kothare; Vasant Sathe
- Story by: Mahesh Kothare
- Produced by: Mahesh Kothare
- Starring: Laxmikant Berde; Mahesh Kothare; Deepak Shirke; Prajakta Kulkarni; Ashwini Bhave; Ravindra Berde; Chandrakant Pandya
- Cinematography: Suryakant Lavande
- Edited by: Vishwas Anil
- Music by: Anil Mohile
- Production company: Jenma Films International
- Release date: 28 September 1990
- Running time: 150 minutes
- Country: India
- Language: Marathi
- Budget: 30 Lakh
- Box office: est.₹3 Crore

Dhadakebaaz (transl. Powerful) is a 1990 Indian Marathi-language action comedy film directed and produced by Mahesh Kothare under Jenma Films International. The screenplay was written by Vasant Sathe and Kothare, while Kothare also provided the story and Purushottam Berde wrote the dialogues. The film features Laxmikant Berde in a dual role, alongside Mahesh Kothare, Deepak Shirke, Prajakta Kulkarni, Ashwini Bhave, Bipin Varti, Ravindra Berde, and Chandrakant Pandya. It was a commercial success & All Time Blockbuster at Box Office India.

It was the first Marathi film to be shot in CinemaScope format. The storyline was written by Kothare, with lyrics by Pravin Davane. The songs were performed by Suresh Wadkar, Sudesh Bhosale, Usha Mangeshkar, Jyotsna Hardikar, Uttara Kelkar, Vinay Mandake, and Anupama Deshpande.

== Plot ==
The film begins with close friends Laxmikant Hajare alias Lakshya (Laxmikant Berde), Mahesh Nemade (Mahesh Kothare) and Bappa Bajrangi (Deepak Shirke) in prison who supported themselves by committing petty crimes. After their release from prison, Mahesh and Bappa decide to cease their criminal activity and go their separate ways. Lakshya is reluctant to part with his friends as he believes that unity is strength. However, Mahesh and Bappa forge ahead and choose to live separately, leaving Lakshya alone and helpless.

Later, Lakshya finds a five rupee coin on the street and keeps it in his jacket pocket. As his pocket has a hole, the coin drops onto the street and Lakshya picks it up again. This happens multiple times. Lakshya then walks into a restaurant and eats various dishes, believing that he has fifteen rupees. When the restaurant owner asks him to pay the bill, Lakshya realises that he does not have enough money for it. The owner throws Lakshya out of the restaurant.

Once again, Lakshya finds the five rupee coin on the street and decides to make money with it by playing poker. In a poker game, he manages to win a few hundred rupees but it is ultimately revealed that he is cheating. The other players begin to physically assault Lakshya, but Mahesh and Bappa coincidentally arrive at the same bar and save Lakshya from them. Lakshya, Mahesh and Bappa escape from the town and vow that they will never break their friendship.

The trio eventually reach the village of Shivapur and visit the temple of Lord Shiva where they pledge to live as law-abiding citizens. While there, Lakshya meets Ganga (Prajakta Kulkarni), a girl selling flowers outside the temple and falls in love with her. In the crowd of a protest, Lakshya's accidentally hits Ganga's uncle Constable Rede (Ravindra Berde) with a stone and the latter angrily arrests Lakshya. At the police station, Mahesh meets Sub-Inspector Uma Jadhav (Ashwini Bhave) and falls in love with her.

While under police custody, Lakshya meets fellow prisoner Divtya (Bipin Varti) who treats him like a servant in prison. Soon, Divtya's accomplices attack the police station to have him released from prison. Divtya manages to escape but Lakshya captures his accomplices for the police. Impressed with his bravery, Uma releases Lakshya from prison and he reunites with Mahesh and Bappa. After the trio save Ganga from being harassed by some goons, she makes their residing arrangements in her cattle shed.

It eventually turns out that Divtya and his accomplices are working for the sadistic Kautya Mahakaal (Chandrakant Pandya), a skull-masked crime lord who is funding crime in Shivapur and remains fugitive to the authorities. Uma has an old enmity with the latter and wants him dead or alive as he had killed her parents as well. In order to free Kavtya Mahakal's arrested henchmen, Divtya and few other henchmen try to capture Lakshya and Ganga, who manage to escape from them and end up at the ruins of an old fort.

Inside the abandoned fort, Lakshya discovers a small bottle and that an exact lookalike of him is trapped in it. He introduces himself as Gangaram (also Laxmikant Berde), a genie and the ancestor of Lakshya. Gangaram tells Lakshya that he was learning magic from a guru thousands of years ago, but an accident occurred, and the guru cursed him by trapping him inside the bottle with magical sand. The guru told him that he will be freed from his curse only when his descendant will use the sand given by him for his own benefit.

Upon learning this, Lakshya agrees to help Gangaram be freed from his curse. Gangaram saves Lakshya and Ganga from Kavtya Mahakal's henchmen and even from the reprimanding of Rede, who disapproves of their relationship. Later that day, Lakshya, Mahesh and Bappa get the job of colouring the temple of Lord Shiva but Mahesh and Bappa are stunned to learn Gangaram's existence from Lakshya. Using his magic, Gangaram colours the temple from the trio's cattle shed in five minutes.

Soon, Kavtya Mahakal and his henchmen attack the village of Shivapur during the festival of Mahashivratri. Despite this, the trio thwart the criminals from the village with the help of Gangaram. Due to this incident, Kavtya Mahakal learns the truth about Gangaram and now decides to seize the bottle for his own betterment. That night, Divtya tries to steal the bottle of Gangaram from the trio's cattle shed but his plan backfires as Lakshya has Gangaram turn Divtya into a frog.

However, things take a drastic turn when Kautya Mahakaal retaliates by having his henchmen abduct Lakshya and Ganga with the bottle of Gangaram. Mahesh, Bappa, Uma and Rede are frantically searching for them and find one of Kavtya Mahakal's henchmen left behind in an injured state at the scene where the abduction took place. Forcing him to reveal the whereabouts of Kavtya Mahakal's hideout, Mahesh, Bappa and Uma reach there on time and free Lakshya and Ganga.

Recovering the bottle from Kavtya Mahakal, Lakshya asks Gangaram to directly kill his entire gang but Gangaram discovers that his sandbag has already emptied. As Mahesh, Bappa and Uma are captured by the henchmen, Gangaram encourages Lakshya to fight against Kavtya Mahakal himself and states that one's mental strength is the real magic in the world. Acting upon Gangaram's encouragement, Lakshya, with a strong heart, overpowers Kavtya Mahakal and his henchmen along with Mahesh and Bappa.

Lakshya and Mahesh further manage to knock Kavtya Mahakal unconscious and the police are called in to the scene by Rede. As a result, all of Kavtya Mahakal's henchmen are arrested and sent to prison for their crimes, while Rede also agrees for Lakshya and Ganga's marriage. As everyone rejoices in the defeat of Kavtya Mahakal, the latter shockingly regains consciousness and shoots down Lakshya fatally before escaping from his hideout. Mahesh chases Kavtya Mahakal and gets into a combat with him.

Eventually, Kavtya Mahakal is shot dead by Uma in revenge for her parents' deaths. Mahesh and Uma return to the crime scene and with Ganga, Bappa and Rede, lament the tragic loss of Lakshya who miraculously survives with the blessings of Gangaram, much to everyone's happiness. Before his departure, Gangaram advises everyone to always be powerful and defeat all the evil in the world, and also to never part with each other and stay united. The film ends with everyone bidding farewell to Gangaram as he is finally freed from his curse and leaves for his heavenly abode.

== Cast ==
- Laxmikant Berde in a dual role as
  - Laxmikant "Lakshya" Hajare
  - Genie Gangaram
- Mahesh Kothare as Mahesh Nemade
- Deepak Shirke as Bappa Bajrangi
- Prajakta Kulkarni as Ganga
- Ashwini Bhave as Sub-Inspector Uma Jadhav
- Ravindra Berde as Constable Rede (Ganga's uncle)
- Chandrakant Pandya as Kavtya Mahakal (Note: It was primarily portrayed by Chandrakant Pandya and Bipin Varti, along with eight other uncredited actors.)
- Bipin Varti as Divtya (Kavtya Mahakaal's henchman)
- Ashok Pahelwan as Kavtya Mahakaal's henchman
- Shanta Inamdar as Parubai (Ganga's mother)
- Ambar Kothare as Police Superintendent (Special Appearance)

== Casting ==
Laxmikant Berde was cast in the lead role of Gangaram, marking his fifth collaboration with Kothare. Although Dada Kondke was initially considered for the part, he declined due to his reluctance to take on a supporting role, leading to Berde being given the role, where he portrayed a dual character. Ashwini Bhave was selected to play Sub-Inspector Uma Jadhav after Varsha Usgaonkar turned down the role. Kothare also offered the role of Bappa Bajrangi to Deepak Shirke, marking their third film together. Prajakta Kulkarni was chosen after auditions for a specific role. The character of the robber Kavtya Mahakal was portrayed by eight different actors throughout the filming process. Bipin Varti initially took on the role but had to leave due to another commitment, although he continued to provide the character's voice-over for the entire film. Laxmikant Berde suffered a hand injury while filming a gunfire sequence.

== Soundtrack ==
Dhadakebaaz

Soundtrack album by Anil Mohile
- Released: 1990
- Genre: Feature film soundtrack
- Length: 26:35
- Language: Marathi
- Label: Ishtar Music

Official audio
- Dhadakebaaz - Full Album on YouTube

Anil Mohile composed music and lyrics are written by Pravin Danve.

Track listing
No.	Title	Singer (s)	Lyrics	Length
1	"Jai Jai Ho Shabhu Deva"	Suresh Wadkar, Vinay Mandake, Sudesh Bhosale	Pravin Danve	5:10
2	"Gangaram Ye"	Sudesh Bhosale, Anupama Deshpande	Pravin Danve	6:36
3	"Phu Bai Phu Phugadi Phu"	Vinay Madake, Uttara Kelkar	Pravin Danve	3:50
4	"Ninne Preminchenu"	Vinay Mandake, Jotsna Hardikar	Pravin Danve	4:10
5	"Hi Dosti Tutayachi Naay" (Happy)	Suresh Wadkar, Sudesh Bhosale, Vinay Mandake	Pravin Danve	3:49
6	"Hi Dosti Tutayachi Naay" (Sad)	Suresh Wadkar, Sudesh Bhosale, Vinay Mandake	Pravin Danve	2:00
