= Arun Paudwal =

Indian composer (1944–1991)

- Born: 9 May 1944; Bombay, Bombay State, British India (present–day Mumbai, Maharashtra, India)
- Origin: India
- Died: 1 November 1991 (aged 47)
- Occupation: Music composer
Arun Paudwal
- Spouse: Anuradha Paudwal (m. 1969)
- Children: Kavita Paudwal (daughter); Aditya Paudwal (son)

Arun Paudwal (born 9 May 1944 – died 1 November 1991) was an Indian music composer in Hindi Films. He worked with music director S. D. Burman for some time.

== Biography ==
Arun Paudwal's wife is the well known Bollywood singer Anuradha Paudwal. Their daughter Kavita Paudwal also became a singer.

He died on 1 November 1991.

== Career ==
Paudwal was a versatile and popular musician, who composed the music for several movies including Marathi and Hindi films.

He composed the song "Ashwini Ye Na" for the Marathi film Gammat Jammat in 1987, which was performed as a duet by the singer Kishore Kumar and Anuradha Paudwal. He also wrote the music for Meera Ka Mohan; the film was released in 1992, after Paudwal's death, and the music became very successful.

== Music career as Duo ==
In earlier years, he composed music with Anil Mohile as a duo 'Anil-Arun'. The duo were music assistants (arrangers) working for S. D. Burman. They assisted the composer along with S. D. Burman's wife, Meera Dev. After that the duo was assistant music director for Bappi Lahiri for more than 15 years.

== Contribution in Music Industry ==
- Sharmeelee (1971) [music assistant] (as Arun)
- Chhupa Rustam (1973) [music assistant] (as Aron Anil)
- Abhimaan (1973) [music assistant] (as Anil Arun)
- Jugnu (1973) [music assistant] (as Arun)
- Prem Nagar (1974) [music arranger] (as Arun)
- Sagina (1974) [music arranger] (as Arun-Anil)
- Zakhmee (1975) [music assistant] (as Arun)
- Chalte Chalte (1976) [music assistant] (as Arun)
- Bhagwan Samaye Sansar Mein (1976) [Composer] (as Anil Arun)
- Aaj Ka Ye Ghar (1976) [Composer] (as Arun)
- Paapi (1977) [assistant music] (as Arun)
- Aap Ki Khatir (1977) [music assistant] (as Arun)
- Dil Se Mile Dil (1978) [music assistant] (as Arun)
- Lahu Ke Do Rang (1979) [music assistant] (as Anil & Arun)
- Guest House (1980) [chief music assistant] (as Aroon)
- Saboot (1980) [music assistant] (as Anil & Arun)
- Ek Baar Kaho (1980) [music assistant] (as Arun)
- Dahshat (1981) [chief assistant music] (as Aroon)
- Pasand Apni Apni (1983) [music assistant] (as Anil)
- Kissi Se Na Kehna (1983) [associate music director] (as Anil Arun)
- Karate (1983) [assistant musical director] (as Anil-Arun)
- Love in Goa (1983) [music arranger] (as Arun)
- Jeet Hamaari (1983) [music arranger] (as Arun)
- Sharaabi (1984) [conductor] (as Anil-Arun) [music arranger] (as Anil-Arun)
- Bhavna (1984) [music assistant]
- Salma (1985) [music assistant] (as Anil-Arun)
- 3D Saamri (1985) [music arranger] (as Anil-Arun)
- Saaheb (1985) [assistant music]
- Baadal (1985) [music assistant] (as Arun)
- Wafadaar (1985) [music assistant] (as Arun)
- Geraftaar (1985) [assistant music] (as Anil-Arun)
- Jhoothi (1985) [assistant music] (as Anil-Arun)
- Aaj Jhale Mukt Mi (1986) [Composer] (as Anil-Arun)
- Ilzaam (1986) [music arranger] (as Arun)
- Locket (1986) [conductor] (as Anil-Arun) [music arranger] (as Anil-Arun)
- Gammat Jammat (1987) [music director] [Composer]
- Ashi Hi Banwa Banwi (1988) [Composer] (as Anil-Arun)
- Maza Pati Karodpati (1988) [Composer]
- Paap Ki Duniya (1988) [music assistant] (as Arun)
- Tamacha (1988) [music assistant]
- Commando (1988) [chief assistant music] (as Anil-Arun)
- Atmavishwas (1989) [Composer]
- Gair Kaanooni (1989) [music assistant] (as Arun)
- Gharkul Punha Hasave (1989)
- Na-Insaafi (1989) [music assistant] (as Arun)
- Khoj (1989) [music assistant] (as Arun)
- Gola Barood (1989) [assistant music] (as Arun)
- Shaitani Ilaaka (1990) [music assistant] (as Arun)
- Ghayal (1990) [music assistant]
- Thanedaar (1990) [music assistant] (as Arun)
- Farishtay (1991) [music assistant] (as Arun Podwal)
- Dushman Devta (1991) [music assistant] (as Arun Podwal)
- Aakhri Cheekh (1991) [music assistant] (as Arun)
- Meera Ka Mohan (1992) [Composer]
- Izzat Ki Roti (1993) [music assistant] (as Arun)
- Aaja Sanam (1994) [Composer]
- Encounter: The Killing (2002) [Composer]

== See also ==
- Paud, ancestral village
