= List of Marathi films of 1994 =

A list of films produced by the Marathi language film industry based in Maharashtra in the year 1994.

== 1994 releases ==
A list of Marathi films released in 1994.

Film	Director	Cast	Release Date	Producer	Notes	Sources
Akka	Shridhar Joshi	Ajay Fhansekar, Sulabha Deshpande, Prashant Damle			Amitabh Bachhan and Jaya Bachchan made special appearance in the film	
Bajrangachi Kamal	Kumar Sohoni	Priya Arun, Laxmikant Berde, Ajinkya Deo				
Bhasma	Purshottam Berde					
Chal Gammat Karu	Ramesh Deo					
Chikat Navra	A. Radhaswamy	Laxmikant Berde, Jaywant Wadkar				
Mukta	Jabbar Patel	Vikram Gokhale, Sonali Kulkarni, Shreeram Lagoo			Sonali Kulkarni's Marathi debut film	
Majha Chakula	Mahesh Kothare	Mahesh Kothare, Laxmikant Berde, Nivedita Saraf, Adinath Kothare, Pooja Pawar, Bipin Varti		Mahesh Kothare		
Sasarche Dhotar	Dada Kondke	Dada Kondke		Dada Kondke		
Varsa Laxmicha	Madhukar Pathak	Sukanya Kulkarni, Ravindra Mankani				
Vazir	Ujwal Thengdi	Ashwini Bhave, Vikram Gokhale		Om Films		
Vishwavinayak	Mayur Vaishnav	Madhav Abhyankar, Prasad Barve, Nagesh Bhonsle		Neha International		
