= List of Marathi films of 1989 =

A list of films produced by the Marathi language film industry based in Maharashtra in the year 1989.

== 1989 Releases ==
A list of Marathi films released in 1989.

Film	Director	Cast	Notes	Source
Saglikade Bombabomb	Avinash Thakur	Ashok Saraf, Varsha Usgaonkar, Nilu Phule, Kishori Shahane, Prashant Damle		
Thartharat	Mahesh Kothare	Mahesh Kothare; Laxmikant Berde; Nivedita Joshi-Saraf; Deepak Shirke; Jairam Kulkarni; Rahul Solapurkar		
De Taali	Datta Keshav	Ramesh Bhatkar, Alka Kubal, Aradhana Deshpande		
Navra Baiko	N. S. Vaidya	Master Bhagwan, Nitish Bharadwaj, Ashok Saraf, Pankaj Bhujbal		
Rajane Wajavila Baja	Girish Ghanekar	Laxmikant Berde, Alka Kubal, Vijay Kadam, Jairam Kulkarni, Pooja Pawar, Manorama Wagle		
Pheka Pheki	Bipin Varti	Ashok Saraf; Savita Prabhune; Laxmikant Berde; Nivedita Joshi-Saraf; Chetan Dalvi; Pratibha Goregaonkar; Ajay Wadhavkar		
Bhutacha Bhau	Sachin Pilgaonkar	Laxmikant Berde, Anant Jog, Sudhir Joshi, Sachin, Ashok Saraf, Viju Khote, Johny Lever		
Balache Baap Brahmachari	Girish Ghanekar	Ashok Saraf, Laxmikant Berde, Sushant Ray, Kishori Shahane, Nivedita Joshi, Alka Kubal		
Hamaal De Dhamaal	Purushottam Berde	Laxmikant Berde, Varsha Usgaonkar, Nilu Phule, Sudhir Joshi, Ashok Shinde		
Dharla Tar Chavtay	Shrinivas Bhange	Ashok Saraf; Rekha Rao; Laxmikant Berde; Alka Kubal; Dilip Prabhavalkar; Priya Arun Berde		
Atmavishwas	Sachin Pilgaonkar	Neelkanti Patekar; Ashok Saraf; Kishori Shahane; Sachin Pilgaonkar; Varsha Usgaonkar; Madhukar Toradmal; Prashant Damle; Archana Patkar; Sunil Barve; Daya Dongre; Sudhir Joshi		
Kalat Nakalat	Kanchan Nayak	Ashwini Bhave, Vikram Gokhale, Savita Prabhune, Ashok Saraf, Sulbha Deshpande, Nilu Phule, Raja Mayekar, Chandu Parakhi, Ravindra Mahajani	National Film Award for Best Feature Film in Marathi in 1989	
Gharkul Punha Hasave	Arun Karnataki	Alka Kubal, Priya Arun, Ramesh Bhatkar, Chandu Parakhi, Sudhir Joshi, Laxmikant Berde		
Pasant Aahe Mulgi	V.N Mayekar	Varsha Usgaonkar, Nitish Bharadwaj, Vandana Gupte, Sudhir Joshi, Kishore Nandlaskar		
Ina Mina Dika	Raju Parsekar	Ashok Saraf, Prashant Damle, Sudhir Joshi, Master Bhagwan		
Vidhilikhit	Padmanabh	Vibhakar Bibalkar, Sudhir Dalvi, Prashant Damle, Vatsala Deshmukh		
Zakali Muth Sawa Lakachi	Govind Kulkarni	Madhu Apte, Alka Kubal, Dilip Prabhavalkar, Dinkar Inamdar		
Madhuchandrachi Ratra	Ramesh Salgaonkar	Ramesh Bhatkar, Ashok Saraf, Alka Kubal, Prashant Damle		
Gavran Gangu	Prakash Kashikar	Vijay Kadam, Irshad Hashmi, Prema Kiran, Jairam Kulkarni, Bhalchandra Kulkarni, Shanta Inamdar, Pramod Shinde		
De Dhadak Bedhadak	Rajeev Barve	Laxmikant Berde, Nivedita Joshi-Saraf, Vijay Kadam, Kuldeep Pawar		
Ek Ratra Mantarleli	Kumar Sohoni	Ashwini Bhave, Nilu Phule, Prashant Damle, Ashutosh Gowarikar, Makarand Deshpande		
