= Dhum Dhadaka =

1985 film by Mahesh Kothare

- Promotional release poster
- Directed by: Mahesh Kothare
- Story by: Annasaheb Deulgaonkar
- Produced by: Mahesh Kothare
- Starring: Ashok Saraf; Mahesh Kothare; Laxmikant Berde; Nivedita Joshi; Surekha Rane; Prema Kiran; Sharad Talwalkar; Bhalchandra Kulkarni; Jairam Kulkarni
- Cinematography: Suryakant Lavande
- Edited by: N. S. Vaidya
- Music by: Anil–Arun
- Production company: Jenma Films International
- Distributed by: Adinath Films Distributors (Maharashtra); Kiran Films Corporation (Mumbai City)
- Release date: 19 August 1985 (Maharashtra)
- Running time: 147 minutes
- Country: India
- Language: Marathi
- Budget: est. IN₹6.5 lakhs (US$7,700)
- Box office: est. IN₹65 lakhs (US$77,000)

Dhum Dhadaka (translation: Hustle and Bustle) is a 1985 Indian Marathi-language slapstick comedy buddy film directed and produced by Mahesh Kothare under Jenma Films International and written by Annasaheb Deulgaonkar. Released in Maharashtra on 19 August 1985, the film stars an ensemble cast of Ashok Saraf, Mahesh Kothare, Laxmikant Berde, Nivedita Saraf, Surekha Rane, Prema Kiran, Sharad Talwalkar, Bhalchandra Kulkarni, and Jairam Kulkarni. The music was composed by Anil-Arun and the lyrics were penned by Shantaram Nandgaonkar. The film is a remake of the Tamil movie Kadhalikka Neramillai (1964), which was also remade earlier in Telugu as Preminchi Choodu (1965), in Hindi as Pyar Kiye Jaa (1966), and in Kannada as Preethi Madu Thamashe Nodu (1979).

== Synopsis ==
A spoilt, young girl, Gauri (Nivedita Joshi), bumps into an impoverished, village-based young man, Mahesh Jawalkar (Mahesh Kothare), on the road and both despise each other at first sight. Coincidentally, Mahesh works in the factory owned by Gauri's widowed father, Dhanaji Ramchandra Wakde (Sharad Talwalkar), who is a haughty, renowned industrialist. Mahesh and Gauri's argument results in Dhanaji firing Mahesh from his job out of affection for his daughter. Nevertheless, a determined Mahesh protests by building a tent in the Wakde household's front yard. He also challenges Dhanaji to get his daughter married to him, causing Dhanaji to retaliate by demolishing Mahesh's tent with the help of the police. After petty misunderstandings, Mahesh and Gauri eventually fall in love, but know that it will be difficult to convince Dhanaji for their marriage as Mahesh is way below the Wakde household's social status. In order to overcome Dhanaji's resistance, Mahesh seeks the aid of his wealthy childhood friend, Ashok Gupchup (Ashok Saraf), by disguising him as his own elderly, estranged, billionaire father, "Yadunath Jawalkar", and thus begins the comedy of errors. Dhanaji instantly falls for the scheme and approves of Mahesh's marriage with Gauri. However, things take a drastic turn when Ashok is shocked to meet Gauri's older sister, Seema (Surekha Rane), as Seema was coincidentally Ashok's girlfriend during a trip in New Delhi. Ashok believes Seema to be Mahesh's girlfriend and leaves the Wakde household in anger, but returns when Mahesh pursues him and clears the misunderstanding. Mahesh reveals Ashok's true identity to Gauri, while Ashok himself reveals his true identity to Seema. Meanwhile, Seema and Gauri's older brother, Laxmikant "Lakshya" (Laxmikant Berde), is an aspiring filmmaker who is not interested in the Wakde household's family business. He desires to sign up a film with a village belle, Ambakka Rede (Prema Kiran), whom he also loves. Thus, Lakshya aims to make Dhanaji finance his upcoming film as well as approve of his marriage with Ambakka. Eventually, Lakshya discovers Ashok's true identity and supports both him and Mahesh in their tactics against Dhanaji. Ashok, Mahesh, and Lakshya will now try all possible ways to impress Dhanaji to approve their respective marriages. Will the trio succeed in their endeavours?

== Cast ==
The cast is listed below (according to the opening credits) -

- Ashok Saraf as Ashok Aaba Gupchup / Yadunath Jawalkar (fake)
- Mahesh Kothare as Mahesh Nana Jawalkar / Mahesh Yadunath Jawalkar (fake)
- Laxmikant Berde as Laxmikant "Lakshya" Dhanaji Wakde
- Nivedita Joshi as Gauri Dhanaji Wakde
- Surekha Rane as Seema Dhanaji Wakde
- Prema Kiran as Ambakka Baldev Rede
- Sharad Talwalkar as Dhanaji Ramchandra Wakde
- Bhalchandra Kulkarni as Aaba Gupchup (Ashok's father)
- Jairam Kulkarni as Nana Mahadev Jawalkar (Mahesh's father)
- Saroj Sukhtankar as Laxmi Nana Jawalkar (Mahesh's mother)
- Bipin Varti as Rabbar Singh (crime lord for smugglers in the climax)
- Dinkar Inamdar as Hambirrao Mohite (Mahesh's village sarpanch)

== Production ==
=== Casting ===
Mahesh Kothare, who aimed to act as Shashi Kapoor in Marathi version of Pyar Kiye Jaa, decided to provide the role of Kishore Kumar to Ashok Saraf. However, he was still searching for someone to portray the character of Mehmood. Eventually, he chose Laxmikant Berde, whom he had met during a play where Kothare's parents were also acting. Ranjana Deshmukh was supposed to act alongside Ashok Saraf, but she had a car accident while filming for Jhanjhaar. Unfortunately, she lost both her legs in the accident, and Surekha Rane replace her in the film. Kothare signed his long-time friend, Nivedita Saraf, for a role opposite to him. Priya Arun Berde was offered to make a debut by portraying a village belle opposite Laxmikant Berde, but since she was still in the 9th grade, she did not accept the role and Prema Kiran ended up portraying the role instead.

== Soundtrack ==
Dhum Dhadaka

Soundtrack album by Anil Arun
- Released: 1985
- Genre: Feature film soundtrack
- Length: 18:08
- Language: Marathi
- Label: T-Series

Official audio
- Dhoom Dhadaka - Full Album on YouTube

The music is composed by Anil-Arun and lyrics penned by Shantaram Nandgaonkar.

Track listing
No.	Title	Singer (s)	Length
1.	"Dhanajirao Murdabad"	Suresh Wadkar	5:00
2.	"Aga Aga Pori Phaslis Ga"	Suresh Wadkar, Jyotsna Hardikar	4:12
3.	"Cinemawala Thamba Jara"	Shabbir Kumar, Uttara Kelkar	4:53
4.	"Priyatama Priyatama Ye Javali Seema"	Suresh Wadkar	3:45
Total length:			18:08

== Accolades ==
32nd Filmfare Awards

- Filmfare Award for Best Film – Marathi
- Filmfare Award for Best Director – Marathi for Mahesh Kothare
- Filmfare Award for Best Actor – Marathi for Laxmikant Berde
