= Damn It Ani Barach Kahi =

2023 Book by Mahesh Kothare

- Book Cover
- Editor: Mandar Joshi
- Author: Mahesh Kothare
- Language: Marathi
- Genre: Autobiography
- Publisher: Mehta Publishing House
- Publication date: January 11, 2023
- Publication place: India
- Media type: Paperback ebook
- Pages: 304
- ISBN: 9788195970964
- Website: Damn It Ani Barach Kahi

Damn It Ani Barach Kahi (डॅम इट आणि बरंच काही, transl. Damn It and a lot more) is a 2023 Indian autobiography book authored by Mahesh Kothare and published by Mehta Publishing House.

== Background ==
Mahesh Kothare named his autobiography "Damn It Aani Barach Kahi" after his fictional character inspector Mahesh Jadhav's famous catchphrase 'Damn It!'. Mahesh Kothare is considered as one of the revolutionary figure in Marathi cinema.

The book contains memories of Marathi cinema, the life of Laxmikant Berde and Mahesh Kothare.

"It is not just an autobiography, it’s a sort of history of Indian cinema over the past 60 years. I have been in the industry since 1962 when I was just 9 years old. It was always there in my mind that I should document my journey of 60 years in the industry because I have seen cinema evolve from black and white days to digital cinema. It’s been a complete journey."

— Mahesh Kothare, the author of book

== Launch ==
The book was launched at Shivaji Mandir, Mumbai. It is hosted by Adinath Kothare and attended by Sachin Pilgaonkar, Nivedita Joshi-Saraf, Urmilla Kothare. Deputy Chief Minister of Maharashtra Devendra Fadnavis was attended the program as well as the book was published by him.

== Reception ==
Akhil Mehta of the Mehta Publishing House said that through the production of the book 'Damn it Ani Barach Kahi' (meaning:Damn it and many things/lot more)', he was able to see the man of stardom hidden behind the warehouses. DCM Devendra Fadnavis said, "Mahesh Kothare has revolutionized Marathi cinema and connected to a new generation. How 'Damn It' was born, is also read in this book." Praising Kothare, Fadnavis said: His contribution to the world of entertainment is unparalleled and he said that Kothare has done new experiments in Marathi.
