= List of Marathi films of 2000 =

A list of films produced by the Marathi language film industry based in Maharashtra in the year 2000.

== 2000 Releases ==
A list of Marathi films released in 2000.

Year	Film	Director	Cast	Release date	Producer	Notes	Source
2000	Astitva	Mahesh Manjrekar	Tabu, Sachin Khedekar, Mohnish Bahl	6 October 2000 (India)	Friends India, Jhamu Sughand Productions, Satyashwami Entertainment Ltd.	National Film Award for Best Feature Film in Marathi in 2000.Talented actress Tabu's Marathi debut	
2000	Mrugjal... Ek Naslela Astitva	Satish Rajwade	Sachin Khedekar, Tushar Dalvi, Resham Tipnis		Blaze Music	Satish Rajwade's directorial debut.	
2000	Khatarnak	Mahesh Kothare	Mahesh Kothare, Laxmikant Berde, Sadashiv Amrapurkar				
2000	Lekroo	Shrabani Deodhar	Sania Jhankar, Mrinal Kulkarni, Sachin Khedekar		Prabhavi Nirmitee		
2000	No Problem	Mandar Shinde	Vijay Chavan, Jeetendra Joshi, Savita Malpekar	26 December 2000 (India)	Everest Entertainment		
