= Suniti Ashok Deshpande =

Indian educator (1954–2015)

Suniti Deshpande
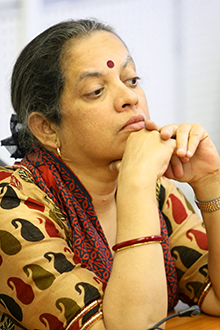

Head and Senior Lecturer Russian Language Institute Russian Cultural and Science Center Mumbai
- In office 1988-2015

Personal details
- Born: Suniti Ashok Deshpande; 8 November 1954 Borivali, Mumbai; Maharashtra, India
- Died: 23 September 2015 (aged 60); Vikhroli, Mumbai; Maharashtra, India
- Parent(s): Father: Ashok Raghunath Deshpande (1921-1973); Mother: Kusum Narsinha Kulkarni (1929-2003)
- Education: BA (Hons) English, 1975; M.A., Entire English, 1977; Diploma in Russian, 1978; Adv. Diploma in Russian, 1979; M.A., Entire Russian, 1979; Ph.D., Russian, 1985
- Alma mater: Gokhale College, Kolhapur; Shivaji University, Kolhapur; Karnataka University, Dharwad; Pushkin Institute of Russian Language, Moscow
- Occupation: Educator, writer, translator, interpreter
- Awards: Medal of Pushkin for Lifetime Contribution, 2007; Best Russian Teacher in the World, 2013
- Website: sunitideshpande.com

Suniti Ashok Deshpande (pronounced 'DESH-paan-day'), (8 November 1954 – 23 September 2015) was an Indian educator, writer, translator and interpreter, best known for her work on spreading the Russian language and culture in India.

Deshpande was the first teacher of the Russian language at Russian Cultural and Science Center in Mumbai and the first Indian to obtain a doctorate in Russian from the Pushkin Institute in Moscow. She wrote the first Russian textbook in India. In July 2007, she was awarded the Medal of Pushkin by President Vladimir V. Putin on behalf of the Russian Federation for Lifetime Contribution to Russian Literature.

== Early life ==
Deshpande was the middle of three children of Ashok Raghunath Deshpande and Kusum Narsinha Kulkarni. Her father Ashok was a law graduate who worked as a labor relations and welfare officer with the Maharashtra State Road Transport Corporation. Her mother Kusum graduated as an English major from Fergusson College in Pune and worked as a teacher at Vidyapeeth and M.L.G Girls High Schools in Kolhapur. She was the eldest daughter and the second child of the lawyer Narsinha Vinayak Kulkarni and his wife Laxmi and the only among eight children to pursue college education and obtain a degree in British India.

Growing up in Kolhapur in Maharashtra, Deshpande was deeply influenced by her mother, who encouraged her children to not follow outdated social customs and achieve their potential by exploring opportunities beyond the local and national borders. Deshpande saw higher education as a way to break out of oppressive customs and the subservient role of women in society. She remained single.

== Education ==
Deshpande enjoyed studying languages and her aptitude at it yielded great results early on. She read, wrote and spoke Marathi, Hindi, Sanskrit, English and Russian fluently. She performed well in Hindi, English and Sanskrit at the final statewide high school graduation (S.S.C.) examination. Deshpande would write in Marathi, English and Russian extensively in the years ahead.

While in college, she won the University Grants Commission scholarship to pursue doctoral studies at the Pushkin Institute of Russian Language in Moscow in 1982. She was the first Indian to obtain Ph.D. in Teaching Russian as a Foreign Language from the institute. She returned to India in 1985 after completing her studies in Moscow ahead of time.

=== Highlights ===
- Winner of merit awards for exemplary grades in General Science, Hindi and Sanskrit at statewide high school graduation (S.S.C.) examination, 1971
- Winner of Open Merit Scholarship awarded by the Government of Maharashtra for undergraduate college study, 1971–75
- Valedictorian in undergraduate degree program of M.A. (English) at Shivaji University, 1977
- Winner of National Dakshina fellowship awarded by the President of India for graduate study, 1975–77
- Valedictorian in graduate degree program of M.A. (Russian) at Shivaji University, 1979
- Winner of University Grants Commission (UGC) fellowship for doctoral study in Moscow, 1982–85
- First doctoral study in former U.S.S.R. by an Indian student in 'Teaching Russian as Foreign Language', 1982–85

== Career ==
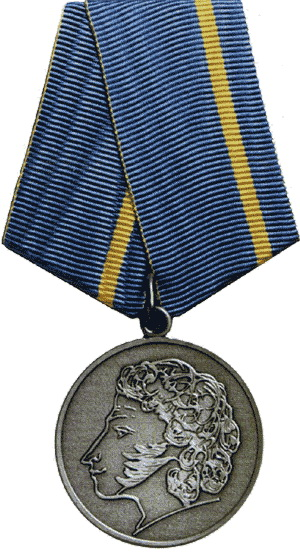
Medal of Pushkin

Deshpande began working at the Russian Cultural and Science Centre in Mumbai in 1988. She became a senior lecturer and the Head of the Russian Language Institute at the centre. Over the course of nearly three decades, she taught Russian to students at the center, staff of India's defense, scientific and diplomatic communities, and traveled to speak about her work.

In 1995, she wrote "Russian Made Easier", the first Russian textbook in India, which was approved and prescribed by many colleges and universities across India. She was the first teacher of the Russian language in Mumbai.

From 1990 to 2015, Deshpande published more than four hundred Marathi and English translations of Russian classics such as Pushkin, Chekhov, Tolstoy, Blok, Yesenin, Akhmatova, Tsvetaeva, Mandelstam, Pasternak, Brodsky and Mayakovsky.

Deshpande wrote 8 books and over 400 short stories, essays and articles. She regularly wrote for popular Marathi publications such as Saamana, Loksatta, Maharashtra Times, Sakal, Dharma Yug and many others, including their special Diwali festival editions, developing a loyal readership with her rich, lucid and entertaining writing style. She also delivered lectures and gave voice-over to documentaries and commercials.

== Awards and Recognitions ==
- Honorary Expert in Russian Language, Special Recognition for South Asia, presented by UNESCO, Paris, in 1986.
- Winner of Moscow-850 International Award: In 1997, she was the only person from India and Asia to win this award.
- Winner of the Pushkin Medal for Lifetime Contribution. Awarded by President Vladimir Putin, Russian Federation, 2007
- Winner of International MAPRYAL (International Association of Teachers of Russian Language and Literature) Award, 2011.
- Best Russian Teacher in the World, an Exclusive Honor by the Russian Federation, 2013.
- Translator of nearly 300 Russian stories from Russian to Marathi and nearly 100 essays and articles in leading and popular Marathi publications including Saamana, Maharashtra Times, Loksatta, Dharma Yug and Sakal.

== Books ==
Cover of Deshpande's "Russian Made Easier", the first Russian textbook in India

- Russian Made Easier, 1996, First Text Book on Russian Language in India, 171 pages, in English, Published by Russian Cultural and Science Center, Mumbai
- Phulanche Bol, (फुलांचे बोल), A Journey To Remember, 316 pages, Short Stories, in Marathi, 2001, Published by Majestic Publications, Mumbai
- My Book of Indian Festivals, Translation from English to Russian, 200 pages, in Russian, 2002, Published by Tatainfomedia Ltd., Mumbai
- Kathantar, (कथाअंतर), Translated Stories, in Marathi, 2003, 139 pages, Published by Majestic Publications, Mumbai
- Antar Parva, (अंतर पर्व), Closeness of Distances, in Marathi, 2004, 130 pages, Short Stories, Published by Mehta Publishing House, Mumbai
- Anand Bhet, (आनंद भेट), A Delightful Meeting, in Marathi, 2005, 117 pages, Short Stories, Published by Mehta Publishing House, Mumbai
- He Bandh Purane, (हे बंध पुराणे), The Old Bonds, in Marathi, 2008, 148 pages, Celebration of Friendship, Published by Majestic Publications, Mumbai
- Sadafuli, (सदाफुली)], Rose Flower, in Marathi, 164 pages, An anthology of Russian stories by Anton Chekhov, in Marathi, 2010, Published by Majestic Publications, Mumbai
