= Pyar Kiye Jaa =

1966 film by C. V. Sridhar

- Poster
- Directed by: C. V. Sridhar
- Written by: C. V. Sridhar; Chitralaya Gopu
- Based on: Kadhalikka Neramillai (1964)
- Produced by: C. V. Sridhar
- Starring: Kishore Kumar; Shashi Kapoor; Mehmood; Kalpana; Rajasree; Mumtaz; Om Prakash
- Music by: Laxmikant–Pyarelal
- Production company: Chithralaya
- Release date: 1966
- Country: India
- Language: Hindi

Pyar Kiye Jaa (transl. Carry on Loving) is a 1966 Indian Hindi-language romantic comedy film directed and produced by C. V. Sridhar. It was successful at the box-office. and stars an ensemble cast of Kishore Kumar, Shashi Kapoor, Mehmood, Kalpana, Rajasree, Mumtaz, and Om Prakash. The film is a remake of the Tamil comedy Kadhalikka Neramillai (1964), which was remade into Telugu as Preminchi Choodu in 1965. Actress Rajasree starred in all three versions of the film. Kadhalikka Neramillai was also later remade in Kannada as Preethi Madu Thamashe Nodu (1979) and in Marathi as Dhum Dhadaka (1985). The role portrayed by Nagesh in the Tamil version was reprised by Mehmood in the Hindi version and by Dwarakish in the Kannada version.

== Plot ==
Ramlal (Om Prakash), a middle-aged widower, lives a wealthy lifestyle near Pune, Maharashtra along with his two daughters, Malati (Kalpana) and Nirmala (Rajasree), and older son, Atma (Mehmood). Malati is a science graduate; Nirmala is a matriculate; and Atma wishes for his father to finance a Hindi film which he will produce himself under "Wah Wah Productions", and even signs up a nubile and attractive Meena Priyadarshini (Mumtaz), a village belle and the daughter of Ramlal's property manager, to portray the female lead role. Ramlal aims to get his daughters married to families that are even wealthier than his, and has an assistant manager, Ashok Verma (Shashi Kapoor), to take care of his property. However, Ramlal fires him after learning that Ashok has misbehaved with both his daughters. As a result, Ashok protests by building a tent in Ramlal's front yard, and eventually falls in love with Nirmala. In order to impress Ramlal for their marriage, Ashok invites his childhood friend, Shyam (Kishore Kumar), in town and disguises him as a wealthy, elderly man. Shyam introduces himself to Ramlal as "Rai Bahadur Ganga Prasad" and claims that he is a billionaire and Ashok's estranged father. Ramlal exploits this opportunity and requests Rai Bahadur to arrange Ashok's marriage with one of his daughters. Ashok and his "father" pretend to reconcile, and Ashok decides to marry Nirmala. However, things take a drastic turn when Ramlal receives another visitor, a wealthy elderly man named Devraj (Chaman Puri), who knew Ramlal during his school-days. Ramlal and Devraj talk about old times, and end up arranging Malati's marriage with Devraj's son, who is none other than Shyam. Ramlal introduces Devraj to Rai Bahadur and begins the preparations for both marriages, unaware that he will discover soon that Devraj's son has gone missing, perhaps refusing to marry someone his father has chosen for him. Meanwhile, Devraj somehow discovers that Ashok is actually the son of a poor schoolteacher, Masterji (Shivraj), and reveals to Ramlal that Rai Bahadur is a fraud. Thus, Ashok and Shyam are both arrested by the police for cheating Ramlal, resulting in chaos. However, all the misunderstandings and problems are finally cleared up, with all the three couples getting married and living happily ever after.

== Cast ==
- Kishore Kumar as Shyam / Rai Bahadur Ganga Prasad
- Shashi Kapoor as Ashok Verma
- Mehmood as Atma
- Kalpana as Malati
- Rajasree as Nirmala
- Mumtaz as Meena Priyadarshini
- Om Prakash as Ramlal
- Chaman Puri as Devraj (Shyam's father)
- Shivraj as Masterji (Ashok's father)

== Soundtrack ==
All the songs were composed by Laxmikant-Pyarelal and lyrics were penned by Rajendra Krishan.

Song	Singer
"Din Jawaani Ke Char, Yaar Pyar Kiye Jaa"	Kishore Kumar
"Dil Humne De Diya, Kyun Tumne Le Liya"	Kishore Kumar, Lata Mangeshkar
"Sunle Pyar Ke Dushman Duniya Dilwalon Ke Afsane, Chal Pade Jo Dhoon Mein To Phir Kab Rukte Hai Deewane"	Kishore Kumar, Lata Mangeshkar, Asha Bhosle, Manna Dey
"Kisne Pukara Mujhe, Main Aa Gayi"	Lata Mangeshkar, Mahendra Kapoor
"Phool Ban Jaunga Shart Yeh Hai Magar"	Lata Mangeshkar, Mahendra Kapoor
"O Meri Maina, Tu Maan Le Mera Kehna, Are Mushkil Ho Gaya Rehna Tere Bina"	Usha Mangeshkar, Manna Dey
"Gore Haathon Par Na Julm Karo"	Mohammed Rafi
"Kehne Ki Nahin Baat"	Mohammed Rafi

== Production ==
According to the book Eena meena deeka: the story of Hindi film comedy by Sanjit Narwekar, Pyar Kiye Jaa was a "frame-by-frame" remake of Sridhar's own Kadhalikka Neramillai.

== Awards and nominations ==
- Filmfare Best Comedian Award for Mehmood
- Filmfare Best Comedian Award – Nomination – Om Prakash
