= Chimani Pakhar =

- Directed by: Mahesh Kothare
- Written by: Story: Dennis Joseph; Dialogue: Shivraj Gorle
- Produced by: Matchindra Chate
- Starring: Padmini Kolhapure; Sachin Khedekar; Bal Dhuri; Nagesh Bhonsle
- Cinematography: Sameer Athalye
- Edited by: Sanjay Dabake
- Music by: Achyut Thakur
- Production company: Deoyani Movies
- Distributed by: Jenma Films International
- Release date: 28 September 2001
- Running time: 137 minutes
- Country: India
- Language: Marathi
- Box office: ₹1.15 crore

Chimani Pakhar (transl. Sparrow & Birds) is a 2001 Indian Marathi-language Family drama film directed by Mahesh Kothare and produced by Matchindra Chate featuring Padmini Kolhapure, Sachin Khedekar, Nagesh Bhonsle, Bal Dhuri, Meghana Chate, Nihar Shembekar, Avinash Chate in lead roles. Music is composed by Achyut Thakur.

The film is an adaptation of 1993 Malayalam film Akashadoothu. It was the first film to introduce Dolby Digital sound to Marathi cinema.

== Plot ==
Nandini (Padmini Kolhapure) and Shekhar (Sachin Khedekar), who grew up in an orphanage, got married, and had four kids: Anju, Vijay, Ajay, and Soni. Vijay and Ajay are twins, but Vijay has trouble moving around. Shekhar drives a jeep, and Annie teaches violin. Despite some money problems, they're a happy family, except when Shekhar spends too much money at the local "toddy shop" because he sometimes drinks too much.

A local toddy vendor Patangrao Kurhade (Nagesh Bhonsle) had an eye on Nandini. One day, he went to her house and tried to rape her. Shekhar came to know about that and has a fight with Patangrao, and things take a bad turn. Patangrao decides to get back at Shekhar. When he sees Ajay riding his bicycle, he hits him with his van. Ajay is hurt, and they find out he needs a blood transfusion. But there's a problem - Nandini can't donate her blood because she's sick. The doctors tell them Nandini has late-stage leukemia and only has a few months to live. This is a shock for the family.

Shekhar tries to change his ways, but one day, during a fight with Patangrao, he gets killed. Nandini is devastated, but she decides to be strong for her family. She worries about what will happen to her kids after she's gone. She doesn't want them to end up in an orphanage like she and Shekhar did, labeled as orphans. So, she makes a tough decision - she will give her children up for adoption.

Nandini, with the help of the school principal, Bapusaheb (Bal Dhuri), arranges for her kids to be adopted. Sonu goes to a doctor's family, Dr. Karnik (Tushar Dalvi) & Mrs. Karnik (Resham Tipnis). Nandini hopes that Ajay and Vijay can stay together, but it's hard to find a family willing to take care of a disabled child like Vijay. Eventually, Nandini decides to give Ajay to a rich couple that is Mr. Pendse (Laxmikant Berde) and Mrs. Pendse (Priya Berde).

Anju, the teenage daughter, decides to stay with her mom, but Nandini and Bapusaheb convince her it's for the best. She goes to live with an old rich couple, Mr. Chaudhari (Ramesh Deo) and Mrs. Chaudhari (Jayshree Gadkar). Now, only Vijay is left without a family. Nandini and Bapusaheb struggle to find someone to take care of him.

As Nandini's health gets worse, she plans a special Diwali celebration at home. She writes a letter to Anju, asking her to always keep in touch with her brothers. On Diwali morning, Nandini dreams that all her children have come to see her, but it's just a dream. She prays for one more day to live so she can see her kids for the last time. In a heartbreaking moment, Vijay finds Nandini dead that night.

At Nandini's funeral, all her children and their new families are there. After the burial, the children and their families sadly part ways. Vijay is about to go to an orphanage when something unexpected happens - Ajay's adoptive parents return. Vijay runs to Ajay, and they embrace each other. Ajay's adoptive father, moved by their connection, agrees to take in Vijay as well. The movie ends with the two brothers happily together.

== Cast ==
- Padmini Kolhapure as Nandini; a school teacher
- Sachin Khedekar as Shekhar; a truck driver
- Nagesh Bhonsle as Patangrao Kurhade; a local toddy vendor & main antagonist
- Bal Dhuri as Bapusaheb; a principal of school
- Meghana Chate as Anju; elder daughter of Nandini & Shekhar
- Nihar Shembekar as Vijay; elder son of Nandini & Shekhar
- Avinash Chate as Ajay; younger son of Nandini & Shekhar
- Bharti Chate as Soni; younger daughter of Nandini & Shekhar
- Vijay Chavan as Dattu; Patangrao's employee
- Rajshekhar as Abasaheb; the chairman of school
- Laxmikant Berde as Shriyut Pendse; Ajay & Vijay's adopted father
- Priya Berde as Priya Pendse; Ajay & Vijay's adopted mother
- Ramesh Deo as Ramesh Chaudhari; Adopted father of Anju
- Jayshree Gadkar as Maithili Chaudhari; Adopted mother of Anju
- Tushar Dalvi as Mr. Karnik; Adopted father of Soni
- Resham Tipnis as Mrs. Karnik; Adopted mother of Soni
- Anand Abhyankar as Doctor
- Mahesh Kokate as PT instructor Dongre
- Ambar Kothare as Shekhar's boss

== Soundtrack ==
Music for this film is composed by Achyut Thakur Lyrics were written by Jagdish Khebudkar.

No.	Title	Singer(s)	Length
1.	"Kiranancha Bandhuni Maal"	Anuradha Paudwal, Achyut Thakur	04:39
2.	"Majhya Gharacha Gokul Jhala"	Suresh Wadkar, Anuradha Paudwal	05:40
3.	"Kashi Kalachi Chahul Aali"	Suresh Wadkar	04:27
4.	"Kon Dakhavila Vat"	Suresh Wadkar	06:23
5.	"Maya Mandir Halale"	Ravindra Sathe	05:30
6.	"Sare Gama Padhanisa"	Anuradha Paudwal	04:58
