= Khatarnak =

Khatarnak (lit. 'Dangerous') may refer to:

- Khatarnak (1974 film), a Pakistani film
- Khatarnak (2000 film), an Indian Marathi-language thriller film by Mahesh Kothare
- Khatarnak (2006 film), an Indian Telugu-language action film, starring Ravi Teja and Ileana D'Cruz
- Khatarnak (2013 film), an Indian Kannada-language crime film about the serial killer Umesh Reddy

== See also ==
- Khatarnaak, a 1990 Indian action film by Bharat Rangachary, starring Sanjay Dutt
