= List of Marathi films of 1985 =

A list of films produced by the Marathi language film industry based in Maharashtra in the year 1985.

== 1985 Releases ==
A list of Marathi films released in 1985.

Year	Film	Director	Cast	Release Date	Producer	Notes	Source
1985	Mahananda	K. G. Korgaokar	Mohan Agashe, Vikram Gokhale, Shashikala			National Film Award for Best Feature Film in Marathi in 1984	
1985	Dhoom Dhadaka	Mahesh Kothare	Mahesh Kothare, Ashok Saraf, Laxmikant Berde, Prakash Phadtare, Nivedita Saraf, Lakshmikant Berde, Sharad Talwalkar, Bhalchandra Kulkarni, Jairam Kulkarni, Prema kiran	19 August 1985	Mahesh Kothare	Only film to have legendary trio Ashok Saraf, Laxmikant Berde and Mahesh Kothare together.	
1985	Vahinichi Maya	Kumar Sohoni	Ravindra Berde, Ramesh Bhatkar, Vijay Chavan		Kripa Films		
1985	Ardhangi	Rajdutt					
1985	Gaon Tasa Changla Pan Veshila Tangla	Anant Mane	Usha Naik, Nilu Phule, Ashok Saraf	21 October 1985 (India)	Everest Entertainment		
1985	Khichdi	V.K. Naik					
1985	Saubhagya Lene	Datta Keshav					
