= Meri Biwi Ka Jawaab Nahin =

- Theatrical Release Poster
- Directed by: Pankaj Parashar
- Produced by: S. M. Iqbal
- Starring: Sridevi; Akshay Kumar
- Cinematography: S. Gopala Reddy
- Edited by: Yusuf Sheikh
- Music by: Laxmikant–Pyarelal
- Distributed by: Iqbal Productions; J.K. Creations
- Release date: 2 July 2004
- Running time: 150 minutes
- Country: India
- Language: Hindi
- Budget: ₹ 22.5 million
- Box office: ₹ 3.9 million

Meri Biwi Ka Jawaab Nahin (transl. My Wife is Matchless) is a 2004 Indian film directed by Pankaj Parashar and produced by S. M. Iqbal. It stars Sridevi and Akshay Kumar. The film was shot in 1994 and delayed for 10 years, finally releasing in 2004. This film was a remake of the 1992 Telugu film Mondi Mogudu Penki Pellam.

== Plot ==
This is the story of a beautiful village girl called Durga, who married her childhood sweetheart, Ajay Khanna. Ajay is a policeman who worked in the city and brought his wife to live with him.

As a simple girl, Durga has the nature of being plain and too talkative. Initially, Ajay looks a little embarrassed to see the nature of his wife, who was always outspoken. But how did he love Durga? But the harsh nature of Durga, always fighting for truth and justice, has brought him more enemies. Durga also makes friends with Gangu, a shopkeeper, Radha, and her brother, Ballu. One night, Durga sees a girl about to be kidnapped by a group of men. She fought off the thugs and rescued the girl.

The thugs are men of Bhairav, a ruthless man who attacked the editor of the press who wants to expose the crime of taking the kidneys illegally from poor people to sell. Angry at the interruption of his business, he then asks a policeman named SP Chaurasia to get rid of Durga.

One day, while Ballu was out of town, his sister, Radha, was kidnapped and taken to a brothel by Bhairav's men. Fortunately, Durga manages to save Radha. However, the brothel is then raided by the police, which is a trap planned by Chaurasia to get rid of Durga. He then asks Durga and Radha to become witnesses, but in court he accuses them of being prostitutes. Unfortunately, at that time, Ajay is sent for duty out of town, so he does not know the fate of his wife. Durga has to fight to clear her good name.

When Ajay returns, he finds out the truth and anxiously helps his wife clear her name. He manages to find the culprit that ruined his wife's reputation, but with the lack of evidence, he could not bring justice to his wife. Meanwhile, Radha's brother returns and is told what had happened by Gangu. In anger, he kills one of Bhairav's men and leaves the dead body in front of Chaurasia's mistress, Savitri's house, in which he was sleeping. When Durga and Gangu see the dead body, Gangu awakens the villagers, and they demand Savitri come out.

Scared of defamation, Chaurasia runs out through the back door only to be caught by the villagers and is beaten up by them. Ajay soon arrives at the scene and drags him to court. Ajay then twists the story as Chaurasia did with his false statement during Durga's trial.

Unfortunately, Savitri comes in as his witness and states that they spent the night together and it was impossible for the murder to happen. Chaurasia is freed only to reveal that Savitri said what she said only because her child was kidnapped by Bhairav's men in order to free Chaurasia. Ballu confesses that he did the murder and is jailed.

Soon after, Savitri goes to the higher authority to tell the truth. In the meantime, Durga and Ajay conduct Radha's wedding. But it is interrupted as Bhairav and Chaurasia wanted revenge on Durga and Ajay. Not long after the fight, the police come and arrest Bhairav and Chaurasia. In the end, Durga's name is cleared, Ballu manages to conduct his sister's wedding as he was granted bail, Durga was approached by entire politicians, Ajay was promoted, and they lived happily ever after.

== Cast ==
- Sridevi as Durga
- Akshay Kumar as Inspector Ajay Khanna
- Gulshan Grover as Ballu
- Anupam Kher as Bhairav Chaudhary
- Johnny Lever as Chitra Gupta
- Laxmikant Berde as Inspector Prakash
- Anil Nagrath as Police Commissioner
- Kiran Kumar as SP Chaurasia
- Neena Gupta as Savitri
- Jayshree T. as Gangu
- Jagdish Raj as DIG
- Brij Gopal as Sanga
- Shiva as G.G.

== Production ==
In the second episode of the fifth season of the talk show Koffee with Karan, Akshay Kumar revealed that the film did not have a climax, and instead displayed a text on the screen that said, "Un dono ne milke phir badla liya" (transl. They both then took their revenge). The climax scene was shot later, with body doubles replacing the lead actors. According to the director Pankaj Parashar, the film suffered production delays due to director Ram Gopal Varma urging Sridevi to lose weight, due to which she had to face serious health issues. He further revealed that the producer passed away during production and the film lost funding, which contributed to the project being shelved for years.

== Soundtrack ==
Music was composed by Laxmikant - Pyarelal.

#	Title	Singer(s)
1.	"Aisa To Koi Aur Duja"	Kumar Sanu, Kavita Krishnamurthy
2.	"Hamra Sajan Sang"	Alka Yagnik
3.	"Hum Sang Kitna Pyaar Hai"	Udit Narayan, Alka Yagnik
4.	"Sari Sari Ratiya Jagi Mori"	Alka Yagnik, Kumar Sanu
5.	"Sab Pyaar Mohabbat Jhooth"	Kavita Krishnamurthy
6.	"Taron Ki Chaon Mein"	Abhijeet, Kavita Krishnamurthy
