= Kadhalikka Neramillai =

1964 Indian film by C. V. Sridhar

- Theatrical release poster
- Directed by: C. V. Sridhar
- Written by: C. V. Sridhar; Chitralaya Gopu
- Produced by: C. V. Sridhar
- Starring: Balaiah; Muthuraman; Nagesh; Rajasree; Sachu; Ravichandran; Kanchana
- Cinematography: A. Vincent
- Edited by: N. M. Shankar
- Music by: Viswanathan–Ramamoorthy
- Production company: Chitralaya
- Distributed by: Chitralaya
- Release date: 27 February 1964
- Running time: 159 minutes
- Country: India
- Language: Tamil

Kadhalikka Neramillai (transl. No Time to Love) is a 1964 Indian Tamil-language romantic comedy film produced and directed by C. V. Sridhar, who also conceived and co-wrote its script with Chitralaya Gopu. The film features an ensemble cast consisting of Balaiah, Muthuraman, Nagesh, Rajasree, Sachu, Ravichandran and Kanchana. The latter two made their acting debut with this film.

The plot of Kadhalikka Neramillai revolves around Viswanathan, an estate owner who hopes to get his daughters Nirmala and Kanchana married to wealthy grooms. However, Nirmala falls in love with Ashok, a poor man who was once employed by Vishwanathan. To earn Viswanathan's approval, Ashok pretends to be the only heir of a rich businessman; he is supported by his friend Vasu, who poses as Ashok's fictional millionaire father Chidambaram. A comedy of errors ensues when Vasu discovers his lover Kanchana is Viswanathan's other daughter.

Principal photography for the film took place mostly in Ooty and at Aliyar Dam Guest House. One song sequence was filmed at Marina Beach, Madras (now Chennai). It was one of the earliest full length Tamil films in Eastmancolor. The cinematographer was A. Vincent, and the editor was N. M. Shankar. The film's soundtrack and score were composed by the duo Viswanathan–Ramamoorthy, with lyrics written by Kannadasan.

Kadhalikka Neramillai was released on 27 February 1964 and was applauded for its comedy; it was a commercial success, running in theatres for more than 175 days. Regarded as a trend-setting comedy, the film has since developed a cult status in Tamil cinema. It was remade in Telugu as Preminchi Choodu (1965) and in Hindi by Sridhar himself as Pyar Kiye Jaa (1966). Rajasree reprised her role in both of those films, while Kanchana did so only in Telugu. The film was also remade in Kannada as Preethi Madu Thamashe Nodu (1979) and in Marathi as Dhoom Dhadaka (1985).

== Plot ==
Viswanathan is an arrogant, money-minded estate owner who lives in a bungalow named Chinnamalai Estate near Pollachi. His son, Chellappa, an aspiring filmmaker, is the antithesis of his father, voicing his displeasure at his father's arrogance. Viswanathan also has two daughters studying in Madras: Kanchana and Nirmala. Kanchana is in love with her collegemate Vasu. The sisters return home after completing their education.

One day, while the sisters are sightseeing, a battered car driven by Ashok, an assistant manager at their father's estate, bumps into their car. The sisters quarrel with Ashok and are annoyed by his insolence. Later, they force Viswanathan to fire him. Infuriated, Ashok pitches a tent overlooking their bungalow and begins a strike to reclaim his job. Nirmala accidentally drops a bucket on Ashok's head. Feeling guilty, she visits Ashok's tent to apologise and they fall in love.

Viswanathan had always planned to get his daughters married to wealthy men. Ashok realises that because he is poor, he has no chance of becoming a prospective groom. Nirmala loves him, but she does not wish to be with him against her father's wishes. He calls up his friend, who happens to be Vasu, to pose as his wealthy father. Vasu arrives at Chinnamalai and agrees to help. He disguises himself as a rich, old man named Chidambaram. When Kanchana is introduced to Vasu in disguise, he is shocked because he briefly believes that Ashok has fallen in love with Kanchana, but he discovers to his relief that Ashok is in love with Nirmala.

Meanwhile, Chellappa starts a film production house called Oho Productions. Unable to earn anyone's faith in his capabilities, he handles the filmmaking himself. Chellappa unsuccessfully tries to persuade his father to finance his film; he engages the estate manager's daughter, Meenalochni, to play the heroine in his film. Chellappa selects Ashok for the film's screenplay and asks "Chidambaram" to fund it. When the film does not progress as expected, Meenalochni's father forces Chellappa to marry her. Chellappa initially refuses but realising he has no choice, he accepts the offer.

On a short trip, "Chidambaram" reveals his true identity as Vasu to Viswanathan's daughters, who agree to play along. Viswanathan, believing Ashok is the only heir to a millionaire, asks Kanchana's consent to marry him. When Kanchana rejects the proposal, Viswanathan asks Nirmala, who happily accepts. Vasu's father Sachidanandam, who is buying a nearby estate, is referred to Viswanathan and arrives in Chinnamalai. They meet and discover that they are childhood friends.

Believing it would be inappropriate to marry off his younger daughter while the elder one is still unmarried, Viswanathan arranges Kanchana's marriage to Vasu, who meets his father but is unable to reveal his true identity to prevent getting caught. When Sachidanandam returns to Madras to make the wedding preparations, he finds that there has been no word from his son, who left for Coimbatore weeks before. Sachidanandam almost cancels the marriage when Vasu makes a telephone call in the nick of time and approves the marriage.

Sachidanandam's car breaks down, and he takes shelter in a school teacher's hut until it is fixed. There, he finds a photograph of Ashok and realises he is the teacher's son. Suspecting Ashok of foul play to usurp Viswanathan's riches, Sachidanandam files a police complaint. Vasu and Ashok are held in custody by the police. As Sachidanandam arrives at the police station, the truth behind the impersonation is revealed and he withdraws his complaint. When his daughters refuse to part with their lovers, Viswanathan realises their love and agrees to their request to get married.

== Cast ==
- Balaiah as Viswanathan
- Muthuraman as Vasu/Chidambaram
- Nagesh as Chellappa
- Rajasree as Nirmala
- Sachu as Meenalochni
- Ravichandran as Ashok
- Kanchana as Kanchana
- Raghavan as Sachidanandam
- Prabhakar as Meenalochni's father
- Veerasamy as Ashok's father

== Production ==
=== Development ===
C. V. Sridhar and Sadagopan, who was known by his screen name Chitralaya Gopu, had been friends since their tenure at St. Joseph's High School, Chengalpattu. At school both were playwrights; Sridhar wrote stage plays and portrayed the lead roles. Gopu wrote the humour-oriented plays and portrayed comic roles. Later, when Sridhar had the opportunity to direct a film, Kalyana Parisu (1959), he asked Gopu to join him and handle the humour content. The success of Kalyana Parisu led to Sridhar establishing his own production house, Chitralaya.

Sridhar used to spend his evenings with Gopu, driving along Marina Beach, Madras (now Chennai). Gopu asked Sridhar whether he would like to work on a comedy film. Sridhar, who was known primarily for dramatic films, thought the audience would not accept a comedy from him. He agreed reluctantly upon Gopu's insistence, and decided to produce a full-length comedy and originated the title, Kadhalikka Neramillai, which translates as "No time for love". The entire story and screenplay were conceived on Marina Beach; according to Gopu, "Sitting in Sridhar's open Herald, we discussed the script for days on end." The screenplay was co-written by Sridhar and Gopu. A. Vincent was hired as the film's cinematography and P. N. Sundaram for photography, while N. M. Shankar was chosen as the editor and Ganga as the art director. Thangappan and Mugur Sundar were the choreographers. Editor B. Lenin, son of director A. Bhimsingh worked as one of the assistant directors.

=== Casting ===
Sridhar consciously avoided casting big stars. P. S. Raman, who went to Madras in 1963 to join a medical college, was asked to see Sridhar, who was auditioning newcomers for the film. Raman was renamed Ravichandran and introduced in this film as the character Ashok. Sivakumar had auditioned for the role before it went to Ravichandran. During a flight, Sridhar met an air-hostess named Vasundhara Devi and approached her to play one of the female leads. Because she shared her name with Vasundhara Devi, the mother of actress Vyjayanthimala, Sridhar renamed her Kanchana to avoid confusion. Her character had the same name. Shanti, who later became known as Vennira Aadai Nirmala, was initially cast as the character Nirmala; however, while filming the song sequence "Anubhavam Pudhumai", her audition, she did not show the romantic mood needed, so she was removed. Gopu called Rajasree over phone and asked her to attend their studio the next day to audition for the role. While filming "Anubhavam Pudhumai", the makers were impressed and she was officially cast, making it her first film as a lead actress.

Sachu, who began her career as a child actor, played leading roles in films such as Veera Thirumagan (1961) and Annai (1962) until Sridhar offered her the comic role of Meenalochni. She initially refused as she was hesitant on playing a comic role. Sridhar assured her that being a full-fledged comedy, there were no separate comedians and that she would only be playing a character in one of the three lead pairs. Gopu also persuaded Sachu's grandmother, who used to accompany her to the sets. Impressed by the way Sridhar "narrated the story featuring three couples", Sachu accepted the offer. She felt that the film's story was as good as Roman Holiday (1953). In 2016, Sachu recalled, "I was very young and most movies were family-oriented. I couldn't relate to them. So when [Kadhalikka Neramillai] came by, I readily agreed." T. S. Balaiah and R. Muthuraman (credited without their initials) were chosen to play the characters Viswanathan and Vasu respectively. Despite Ravichandran and Muthuraman being written as the film's "heroes", Balaiah was given top billing. Nagesh was signed by Sridhar to play Viswanathan's son Chellappa after previously appearing under Sridhar's direction in Nenjil Or Aalayam (1962). Telugu actor Krishna stated that he was offered a role in the film by Sridhar, but he could not accept it due to his lack of knowledge in Tamil.

=== Filming ===
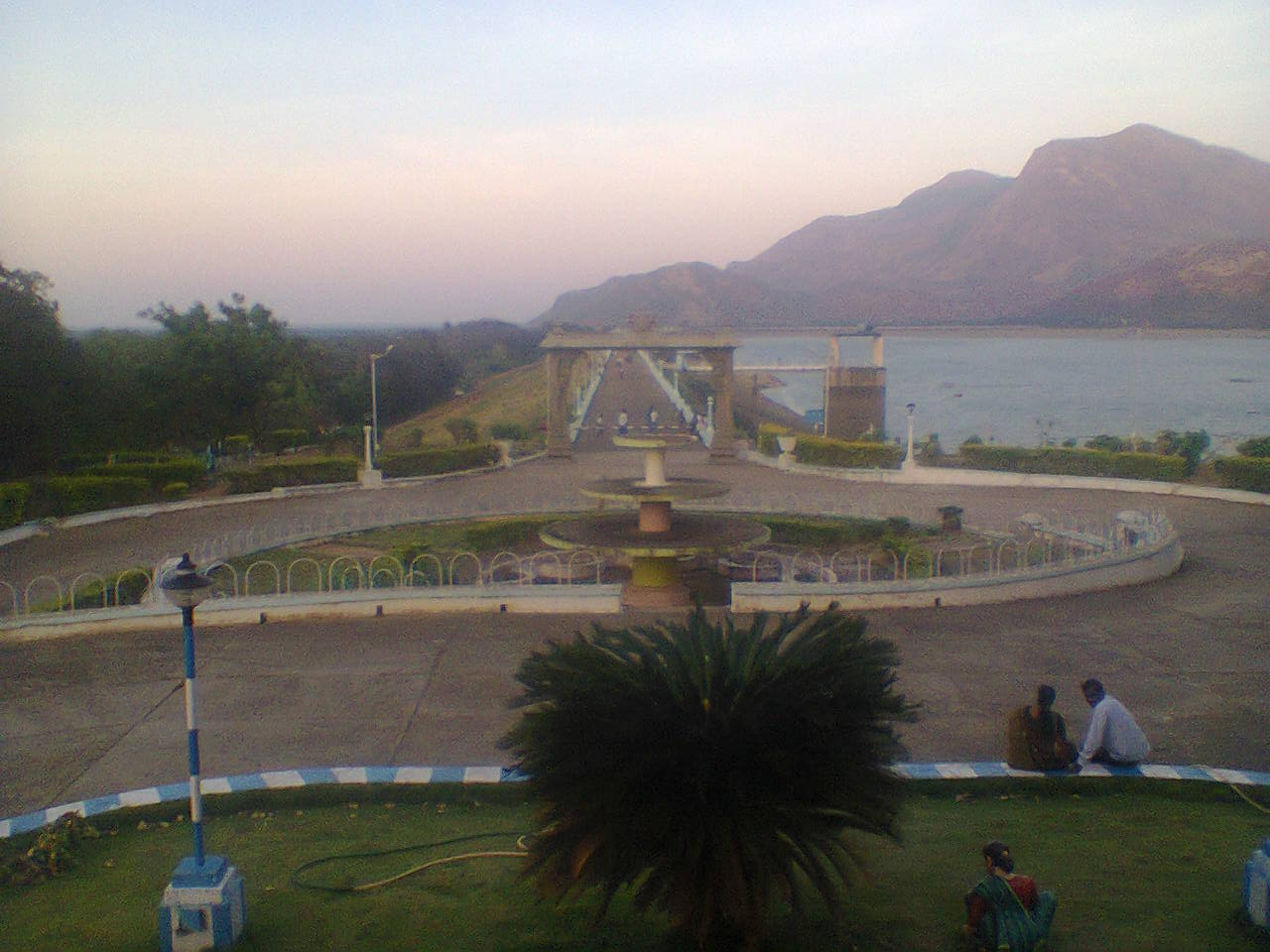
Aaliyar Dam, as seen from the Chinnamalai Estate bungalow where a major portion of the film was shot.

Kadhalikka Neramillai was one of the earliest full-length Tamil films in Eastmancolor. (Note: Though Kadhalikka Neramillai is often assumed to be the first full-length Tamil film in Eastmancolor, it was actually Karnan, released a month before. Sridhar himself said his film was only the first full-length Tamil film in Eastmancolor with a contemporary setting.) Film critic Baradwaj Rangan believes that with this film, Sridhar became the first Tamil director to "make an all-out comedy in colour". Principal photography commenced with the song "Anubhavam Pudhumai", picturised on Ravichandran and Rajasree. Portions of the song featuring the latter were the first scenes shot. Because the producers had not taken measurements for her costumes, Rajasree was sceptical about whether filming would begin that day. She was given a nightgown as the costume for the song sequence. Sachu's costumes were designed by Sridhar himself. An electric power cut was imposed during the week ending 22 June 1963; while this reduced work in studios by 50%, an unfazed Sridhar did "a brief spell of shoot" for Kadhalikka Neramillai at Vijaya Vauhini Studios.

The opening sequence song "Enna Parvai" picturised on Muthuraman and Kanchana was filmed on the Marina beach promenade. In the first scene of the film, Sridhar attempted to depict Madras as a "progressive place: where couples sang duets on the Marina". Most of the film was shot in Ooty. After completing the first filming schedule, Sridhar decided to drop the project as he felt it lacked a strong storyline then restarted after making a visit to Aaliyar Dam, he decided to make a full-length film on this location. Filming also took place on location at the Aaliyar Guest House, a bungalow near Aaliyar Dam, Coimbatore. Sridhar often used to write dialogues for scenes only on the shooting spot which made Ravichandran difficult to utter dialogues. During filming, Gopu gave Ravichandran the lyrics of the song "Naalaam Naalaam", which were written like tongue twisters in chaste Tamil. He claimed they were his own lines and asked him to memorise them. When Sridhar called for the shots, Ravichandran asked for more time because he found it difficult to remember the dialogue. The puzzled director then said, "This isn't the dialogue. Who gave it to you? This is a social film, a comedy. Gopu must have done it. He's always pulling a fast one, don't you know?"

In one scene, Viswanathan asks Chellappa to tell a story, promising to finance his film if he is impressed. Knowing he will not receive any funds, Chellappa decides to scare Viswanathan and narrates a horror story. Nagesh and Balaiah completed shooting the scene in a single take. This scene was inspired by director Dada Mirasi's storytelling style, specifically the way in which Mirasi narrated the basic storyline of Puthiya Paravai (1964) to its lead actor Sivaji Ganesan's brother V. C. Shanmugham who, impressed with the narration, called Sridhar to listen to it. Kanchana recalled filming the scene: "I was standing behind, trembling to control my laughter. The moment the scene was over, the entire team began to laugh, so hard, we soon had tears running down our faces." The film was processed at Gemini Studios' laboratory. Its final length was 4,355.97 metres (14,291.2 ft).

== Music ==
The soundtrack album and background score for Kadhalikka Neramillai were composed by Viswanathan–Ramamoorthy (a duo consisting of M. S. Viswanathan and T. K. Ramamoorthy) and the lyrics were written by Kannadasan. The song "Anubhavam Pudhumai" is loosely based on a 1940 Spanish-language Mexican song titled "Bésame Mucho". Philips, an autodidact guitarist, played the guitar for "Anubhavam Pudhumai" and "Malarendra Mugamondru".

Viswanathan and his wife were spending a vacation in Yercaud for a week, when Kannadasan, Gopu and Sridhar were waiting for him to begin composing the songs. The day when Viswanathan returned and arrived at Chithralaya office, Kannadasan said, "Ennappa..Viswanathaa...Velai kodu.." (Viswanathan, give me some work). Sridhar then said that should be the beginning of the song and decided to give Balaiah's character the name Viswanathan; thus the song "Maadimele", which includes the line "Viswanathan Velai Vendum", was conceived. It was composed as a rock and roll number. Tunes of "Naalam Naalam" and "Nenjathai Alli" were composed within an hour. The song "Naalam Naalam" is set in Bageshri raga.

Kadhalikka Neramillai's LP records were heavily in demand by people who wanted to learn the film's dialogues and songs. All the eight songs became popular among fans. A live version of "Nenjathai Alli" was later performed by Unni Menon at an August 2012 ceremony commemorating the 14th anniversary of Jaya TV.

No.	Title	Singer(s)	Length
1.	"Enna Paarvai"	K. J. Yesudas, P. Susheela	03:21
2.	"Maadimele"	P. B. Sreenivas	03:26
3.	"Unga Ponnaana Kaigal"	P. B. Sreenivas	03:26
4.	"Anubhavam Pudhumai"	P. B. Sreenivas, P. Susheela	05:30
5.	"Naalaam Naalaam"	P. B. Sreenivas, P. Susheela	03:21
6.	"Malarendra Mugamondru"	L. R. Eswari, M. S. Raju	03:20
7.	"Kadhalikka Neramillai"	Sirkazhi Govindarajan	04:55
8.	"Nenjathai Alli"	K. J. Yesudas, P. Susheela, L. R. Eswari	03:44

== Release ==
Kadhalikka Neramillai was released on 27 February 1964. Artist Jeyaraj designed the publicity posters; the pre-release poster designed by him depicted a shooting spot. Gopu said Chitralaya released the film because initially there was no willing exhibitor; the first showings were at the Casino Theatre in Madras and later in Madurai. A few weeks after its release, the film caught the attention of theatre distributors, who competed with one another for it. Eventually, it became a major commercial success, running for more than 175 days in theatres and becoming a silver jubilee film. (Note: A silver jubilee film is one that completes a theatrical run of 175 days.) In April 2010, Kadhalikka Neramillai was one of five films screened at the South Indian Film Chamber Theatre for the Dignity Film Festival held in Chennai; the other four were Madhumati (1958), Server Sundaram (1964), Anbe Vaa (1966) and Thillana Mohanambal (1968). During the successful run, the film attracted controversy with an MLA accusing the film of promoting vulgarity and that it is harmful to the society; the controversy benefited the film even more and it went to make more profits.

== Reception ==
Upon release, the film was widely appreciated for the comedy sequences featuring Nagesh. On 29 February 1964, the critic from The Indian Express noted that the lack of major stars gave the film a feeling of freshness, applauded the performances of the cast and concluded, "One cannot carry home anything after seeing the picture. But its very purpose is just that: to ease you of all your worries." On 15 March 1964, Sekar and Sundar of the Tamil magazine Ananda Vikatan jointly reviewed the film. Sekar said that seeing mainly newcomers in colour gave a refreshing feeling to his eyes which had become tired seeing films with only familiar actors. Sundar called the film a welcome change for Sridhar, then known mainly for melodramatic films. Both men applauded the performances of Balaiah, Muthuraman and Nagesh, with Sekar appreciating the casting of Balaiah, generally known for negative roles, as a "first class" comedian. Sundar praised the colour cinematography by Vincent, saying it elevated him to the next level. Sekar concluded by praising the filmmakers for having given Tamil cinema an innovative and entertaining comedy.

On 28 March, T. M. Ramachandran of Sport and Pastime applauded nearly every aspect of the film, including the cast performances, the colour processing by Gemini ("it almost passes muster for a well-made foreign film"), the camera work by Vincent and Sundaram, the depiction of Marina Beach and other outdoor sequences, and Ganga's art direction. The magazine Link said, "There is no story at all in it. In fact, there is no need for one. All that is necessary is for a peacock of a young chap to go dancing and flirting with a peahen of a girl for most part of the three-hour run." The critic applauded Vincent's cinematography, because of which "there is never a dull moment for the viewer." They also praised Kanchana as "personable" but criticised her diction, added that Ravichandran was an "agreeable companion" to Rajasri, Nagesh "reels off his witty script", and concluded that Balaiah "emerges as the evergreen hero, though cast in a fatherly role. Nonsense, no doubt, but thoroughly enjoyable nonsense for a change." Kanthan of Kalki appreciated Balaiah's performance, Nagesh's comedy, the colour and photography, but felt Kanchana was underutilised.

== Remakes ==
In 1965, Kadhalikka Neramillai was remade in Telugu as Preminchi Choodu, and featured Kanchana and Rajasree reprising their roles. The following year, the film was remade in Hindi as Pyar Kiye Jaa, with Sridhar returning to direct. Rajasree again reprised her role, and was the only actor to appear in both these remakes. The film was also remade in Kannada as Preethi Madu Thamashe Nodu (1979), and in Marathi as Dhoom Dhadaka (1985).

In August 2008, The Hindu reported that Manobala would be directing a remake of Kadhalikka Neramillai with R. Madhavan in the lead role, but this never came to fruition. Plans for a contemporary remake drew criticism. In a 2012 interview with Rekhs, a celebrity columnist for Behindwoods, Gopu said, "This film even if it is remade today, will not hold a candle to its original". Comedian and playwright Crazy Mohan said, "Kadhalikka Naeramillai is Tamil Cinema's Mount Everest of comedy. There's no other Tenzing [Norgay] in sight so far. I was aghast that some people even considered re-making Kadhalikka Naeramillai. None should attempt it. It is blasphemy". Sharadha Narayanan of The New Indian Express stated in February 2009, "Recently when the news of Kadhalikka Neramillai's remake was announced, every lip had one question that went unanswered: Who can actually do Nagesh's role at least the way he did, if not better?" According to Sridhar's son Sanjay, plans to remake the film were dropped due to casting difficulties, especially finding actors who could match Nagesh and Balaiah's performances.

== Legacy ==
... [Kadhalikka Neramillai is] Tamil Cinema's dictionary for humour ... And it has a solid message camouflaged in humour, that if you go in for ostentation and sycophancy you are bound to bite the dust ... No cheap rib-ticklers for Sridhar and Gopu! They could have made many a joke with the false beard Muthuraman sported in the film, but they didn't. Classy comedy was their forte.

— Crazy Mohan and his brother Maadhu Balaji on how Kadhalikka Neramillai inspired them.

Kadhalikka Neramillai attained cult status in Tamil cinema. It has been hailed as a trendsetting comedy, and the film is said to kindle a feeling of joie de vivre. The film's comedy sequences are regarded as evergreen. The success of their on-screen pairing led Nagesh and Sachu to act together in films such as Motor Sundaram Pillai (1966), Galatta Kalyanam (1968), Sivandha Mann (1969) Sumathi En Sundari (1971) and Urimaikural (1974). According to M. Bharat Kumar of News Today, Kadhalikka Neramillai also popularised the romantic comedy genre.

While the comedy track of 'Oho Productions' featuring Nagesh is considered to be one of Gopu's masterpieces, the Balaiah-Nagesh scene is often termed to be legendary in Tamil cinema. In a film that featured mostly newcomers, Balaiah was the most senior artiste. When the Balaiah-Nagesh pairing was an instant hit, he praised the latter saying, "Watch out! This boy is a scene-stealer." In 2009, playwright and comedian Y. G. Mahendran said the film taught him "there is everything to know about comedy—what is timing, what is healthy comedy, what is situational comedy ... It also portrayed love in such a clean and healthy way [...] Kaadhalikka... is a movie for all seasons."

Crazy Mohan listed Kadhalikka Neramillai among his favourite films. During the celebrations of the film's 50th anniversary, Kamal Haasan appreciated Gopu's dialogue in the film while Y. G. Mahendran said, "[Kadhalikka Neramillai] was Wodehouseian humour at its best—unadulterated and pure." Director Vasanth noted in 2016, "when I watched Sridhar's [Kadhalikka Neramillai] that guarantees three hours of non-stop laughter, I understood what filmmaking is all about. A director par excellence is someone who can handle all subjects and infuse all kinds of emotions in the audience."

== In popular culture ==
In 2006, Crazy Mohan wanted to create something similar to Kadhalikka Neramillai. He wrote the story and screenplay of the film Jerry, which he described as his "pet project". In 2011, director I. Ahmed's then-forthcoming film was initially titled Kadhalikka Neramillai, but this was changed to Endrendrum Punnagai (2013) because the producers could not get the rights to use the former name.

Y. G. Mahendran has a particular affinity for Kadhalikka Neramillai. When he launched his theatre group United Amateur Artists' 55th play, he named it Kadhalikka Neramundu (There is time for love) as a tribute to Gopu and Sridhar. The play, a parody of the film, was written by Gopu's son 'Chitralaya' Sriram. Footage from Kadhalikka Neramillai is also shown in Kadhalum Kadandhu Pogum (2016). The "horror film" scene picturised on Chellappa and Viswanathan was re-used in Mo (2016).

== Bibliography ==
- Narwekar, Sanjit (2012). Eena Meena Deeka: The Story of Hindi Film Comedy. Rupa & Co. ISBN 978-81-291-2625-2.
- Rajadhyaksha, Ashish; Willemen, Paul (1998) [1994]. Encyclopaedia of Indian Cinema. British Film Institute and Oxford University Press. ISBN 0-19-563579-5.
