= Hamaal De Dhamaal =

- Poster
- Directed by: Purushottam Berde
- Written by: Purushottam Berde
- Produced by: Purushottam Berde
- Starring: Laxmikant Berde; Varsha Usgaonkar; Sudhir Joshi; Nilu Phule; Shanta Inamdar; Vaishali Dandekar; Anil Kapoor
- Cinematography: Suryakant Lavande
- Edited by: Ashok Patwardhan
- Music by: Anil Mohile
- Production company: Om Nishant Chitra
- Release date: 27 September 1989
- Running time: 124 minutes
- Country: India
- Language: Marathi

Hamaal De Dhamaal (transl. Porter Rocks) is a 1989 Indian Marathi-language romantic comedy film directed and produced by Purushottam Berde. The film stars Laxmikant Berde and Varsha Usgaonkar in lead roles while Sudhir Joshi, Nilu Phule, Shanta Inamdar, Vaishali Dandekar and Anil Kapoor (who made his debut in Marathi cinema) appear in supporting roles.

== Plot ==
Raja, born into the life of a coolie, harbors a dream of becoming a colossal superstar. His destiny takes a turn when he crosses paths with the glamorous heroine, Nandini Patwardhan. After a blossoming romance, misunderstandings arise, leading to a rift. Eventually, both Raja and Nandini become superstars in their own right, unaware of each other's continued success. As fate weaves its intricate threads, they gradually understand the miscommunications and reconcile, culminating in a heartfelt union. This journey unfolds against the backdrop of stardom, love, and the pursuit of dreams, making for a compelling narrative of Marathi film proportions.

== Cast ==
=== Main ===
- Laxmikant Berde as Raja Nilkanth Phule
- Varsha Usgaonkar as Nandini Arjun Patwardhan
- Sudhir Joshi as Colonel Arjun Patwardhan (Nandini's father)
- Nilu Phule as Nikanth Budhaji Phule (Raja's father)
- Shanta Inamdar as Parvati Nilkanth Phule (Raja's mother)
- Vaishali Dandekar as Jaya Arjun Patwardhan (Nandini's younger sister)
- Sonali Adhikari as Sunanda Nilkanth Phule (Raja's younger sister)
- Ashok Shinde as Inspector Ashok Shinde (Sunanda's husband)
- Ravindra Berde as Chintya Dada (Raja's friend)
- Chetan Dalvi as Raja's friend
- Kishore Nandlaskar as Raja's friend
- Ajay Wadhavkar as Constable Ganapat
- Jaywant Wadkar as Jiva
- Vijay Patkar as Shiva
- Deepak Shirke as Thief
- Ramesh Bhatkar as Inspector

=== Special Appearances ===
- Anil Kapoor
- Sachin Pilgaonkar
- Mahesh Kothare
- Amitabh Bachchan
- Dilip Kumar
- Vinod Khanna
- Rishi Kapoor
- Rekha
- Sridevi

== Soundtrack ==
Hamaal De Dhamaal

Soundtrack album by Anil Mohile
- Released: 27 May 1991
- Genre: Feature film soundtrack
- Length: 33:59
- Language: Marathi
- Label: Ishtar Music

Official audio
- Hamaal De Dhamaal - Full Album on YouTube

The songs are composed by Anil Mohile.

All music is composed by Anil Mohile.

Track listing
No.	Title	Lyrics	Singer (s)	Length
1.	"Manmohana Tu Raja Swapnatala"	Vivek Apte	Asha Bhosle, Ravindra Sathe
2.	"Bola Bajarangachi Kamaal, Hamaal De Dhamaal"	Vivek Apte	Suresh Wadkar, Vinay Mandke, Jyotsna Hardikar
3.	"Dhakkumakum Dhakkumakum"	Purushottam Berde	Vinay Mandke, Pradnya Khadekar, Kiran Shembekar
4.	"Mi Aalo Mi Pahile Filmstar"	Nilesh Patil	Suresh Wadkar, Purushottam Berde
5.	"Nesale Ga Bai"	(Traditional)	Padmakar Deshpande, Ashok Hande
6.	"Sa Re Ga Ma"	Vivek Apte	Shradha Salvi
7.	"Tan Man Dhan Arpuni Tuj"	Nilesh Patil	Ravindra Sathe
