= Bajrangachi Kamal =

1994 Indian film

- Title card
- Directed by: Kumar Sohoni
- Written by: Shivraj Gorle
- Produced by: Aravind Samant
- Starring: Laxmikant Berde; Priya Arun; Ajinkya Deo; Nishigandha Wad; Sudhir Joshi
- Cinematography: Sameer Athalye
- Music by: Anil Mohile
- Production company: Shree Ashtavinayak Chitra
- Release date: 11 August 1994
- Running time: 134 minutes
- Country: India
- Language: Marathi

Bajrangachi Kamal (transl. Masterliness of Bajrang) is a 1994 Indian Marathi-language comedy drama film directed by Kumar Sohoni and produced by Arvind Samant under the banner of Shree Ashtavinayak Chitra. Shivraj Gorle provided story, screenplay, and dialogues. It starring Laxmikant Berde, Priya Arun, Ajinkya Deo, Nishigandha Wad, Sudhir Joshi in the leading roles.

== Plot ==
Danger Don, who abducts children, terrorises a town. Lakshya, a police constable who wants to become famous, impersonates Danger Don and abducts children before returning them to their families. After receiving the blessing of Bajrangbali, Lakshya then uses his blessings to rescue the children from the real Danger Don.

== Cast ==
- Laxmikant Berde as Hawaldar Bajrang "Bajya" Bagde
- Priya Arun as Maina
- Ajinkya Deo as Inspector Vikram Shinde
- Nishigandha Wad as Priya Pradhan
- Sudhir Joshi as Vastad, Maina's father
- Shrirang Godbole as Danger Don
- Suhas Joshi as Chief Minister wife
- Jairam Kulkarni as DSP Pradhan
- Ravindra Berde as Inspector Sitaram Dhopte
- Vijay Patkar as Hawaldar Gajya
- Sunil Shende as Chief Minister
- Kishore Nandlaskar as Balu
- Jitendra Pandit as Kapil, Chief Minister's son

== Soundtrack ==
The music is composed by Anil Mohile.

Track listing
No.	Title	Singer(s)	Length
1	"Bajrangani Keli Dhamaal"	Vinay Mandke; Uttara Kelkar	3:14
2	"Jau Nako Tu Dur Dur"	Suresh Wadkar; Sadhna Sargam	3:31
3	"Tu Tu Tu"	Sudesh Bhosle, Pournima	7:05
