= Bal Dhuri =

Indian actor

Bal Dhuri is a Marathi theatre actor. He is best known for his multiple roles in Marathi movies and his portrayal of King Dasharatha in Ramanand Sagar's TV serial, Ramayana (where Jayshree played his wife, Kaushalya), and in the movie Tere Mere Sapne as the uncle of Chandrachur Singh.

He was instrumental in giving a break to veteran actor Shivaji Satam in the musical drama Sangeet Varad. He married Jayshree Gadkar, the noted Marathi and Hindi movie actress in 1975.

== Filmography ==
Year	Film	Role	Type	Language
	Devachiye Dwaari		Film	Marathi
	Pahuni		Film	Marathi
	Raja Pandharicha		Film	Marathi
	Sasar Maher		Film	Marathi
1976	Jai Bajrang Bali		Film	Hindi
1981	Soon Maazi Laxmi		Film	Marathi
1985	Singhasan Battisi	Indra	TV series	Hindi
1986	Ramayan	Dasharatha	TV series	Hindi
1988	Pandharichi Waari		Film	Marathi
1989	Eeshwar		Film	Hindi
1989	Satyavadi Raja Harishchandra		Film	Gujarati
1990	Souten Ki Beti		Film	Hindi
1990	Darode Khor		Film	Marathi
1991	Mumbai Te Mauritius		Film	Marathi
1994	The Great Maratha	Balaji Baji Rao	TV series	Hindi
1996	Tere Mere Sapne	Ram Singh	Film	Hindi
2000	Ashi Asavi Sasu		Film	Marathi
2000	Chimani Pakhar	Bapusaheb	Film	Marathi
2006	Hirava Kunku		Film	Marathi
2007	Bandh Premache		Film	Marathi
2007	Tighi		Film	Marathi
2007	Maher Majhe He Pandharpur		Film	Marathi
2008	Ashi Hi Bhaubij		Film	Marathi
2010	Khurchi Samrat		Film	Marathi
2011	Sadarakshanaay	Vasant Pandit	Film	Marathi
