= Shame To Shame =

1991 Indian comedy drama film

- Official release poster
- Directed by: Purushottam Berde
- Written by: Purushottam Berde
- Starring: Laxmikant Berde; Priya Arun; Deepak Shirke; Vijay Chavan
- Cinematography: Suryakant Lavande
- Edited by: Ashok Patwardhan
- Music by: Anil Mohile
- Production company: Om Nishant Chitra
- Distributed by: Everest Entertainment
- Release date: 1991
- Running time: 138 minutes
- Country: India
- Language: Marathi

Shame To Shame (lit. 'Same To Same') is a 1991 Indian Marathi-language comedy drama film written and directed by Purushottam Berde, produced by Om Nishant Chitra. The film stars Laxmikant Berde, Priya Arun, Deepak Shirke, Vijay Chavan.

== Cast ==
- Laxmikant Berde as Commissioner Ram Jawle/ Laxman Jawle/ Bhalu Jawle/ Shantanu Jawle
- Priya Arun as Pallavi Dadarkar/ Shevanta Othurkar
- Deepak Shirke as Satvajirao / Hawaldar 100
- Vijay Chavan as Zenda Mama
- Chaitanya Berde as Chaitya
- Ravindra Berde as Headmaster Kaka/ Ramprasad Sharma
- Madhu Chavan as Madhu/Sadu
- Alka Inamdar as Laxman's wife/ Bhalu's mother
- Vijay Patkar as Nachya
- Jaywant Wadkar as Kalu/ Balu
- Kishore Nandlaskar as PT Master

== Soundtrack ==
Shame To Shame

Soundtrack album by Anil Mohile
- Released: 1991
- Genre: Feature film soundtrack
- Length: 35:15
- Language: Marathi
- Label: Ishtar Music

Track listing
No.	Title	Singer(s)	Length
1	"Aala Vhata Jawa Shanideva Tujha Fera"	Ashok Hande	5:24
2	"Aav Aas Kaay Karata Baai"	Uttara Kelkar, Ravindra Sathe	5:33
3	"Bugadi Majhi Sandali Ga"	Ashok Hande	9:19
4	"He Viprit Ghadale"	Sadhana Sargam, Pradnya Khadekar	4:42
5	"Hi Mumbai Bhaltich Danger"	Ravindra Sathe, Vinay Mandke	4:33
6	"Mi Tujhach Tujala"	Suresh Wadkar, Pradnya Khadekar	4:37
7	"Prarthana"	Pradnya Khadekar	1:07

== Reception ==
The film received 6 rating out of 10 at the Bollywood Hungama.
