= Bhagya Dile Tu Mala =

2022 Indian Marathi-language TV series

- Genre: Drama; Soap opera
- Created by: Colors Marathi
- Screenplay by: Amol Patil
- Starring: See below
- Country of origin: India
- Original language: Marathi
- No. of episodes: 617

Production
- Producer: Kashmira Pathare
- Camera setup: Multi-camera
- Running time: 22 minutes
- Production company: Virat Entertainment

Original release
- Network: Colors Marathi
- Release: 4 April 2022 – 20 April 2024

Related
- Kannadathi

Bhagya Dile Tu Mala (transl. You gave me luck) was an Indian Marathi language television series which airing on Colors Marathi. It is produced by Kashmira Pathare under the banner of Virat Entertainment. It premiered from 4 April 2022 by replacing Sonyachi Pavala. It stars Tanvi Mundle, Vivek Sangle and Nivedita Saraf in lead roles. It is an official remake of Kannada TV series Kannadathi.

== Plot ==
Kaveri, a village girl from Guhagar, goes to Mumbai to work as a temporary lecturer to pay off her family's debts, and expects her friend Vaidehi to help. Vaidehi runs a company that performs wedding ceremonies, and meets Rajvardhan, CEO of Cafe, at his cousin Aditya's wedding immediately falling in love. Saniya's (Aditya's fiancé) parents ask Ratnamala (Rajvardhan's mother) who is the owner and founder of School and Cafe, a huge share in their property, to which she reluctantly agrees. After the wedding, Ratnamala leaves for Devi Darshan on a bus that travels through her home village Guhagar. Kaveri, who returned to Guhagar after she helped at Aditya's wedding, finds Ratnamala injured by a snake bite. Kaveri takes Ratnamala to her home, and she is impressed by Kaveri's hospitality and kindness, and they become close.

Ratnamala returns to Mumbai and offers a Marathi lecturer post to Kaveri without the latter's knowledge. She also helps Kaveri find a house to rent. Kaveri and Rajvardhan encounter each other many times; Kaveri looks after Rajvardhan at her home when he is sick for a few days. Ratnamala's doctor tells her that she will soon die. Ratnamala wants Rajvardhan to marry Kaveri; the two share a mutual attraction, but Rajvardhan has doubts about her idealism in his practical world while Kaveri hides her feelings by claiming they are just friends. Vaidehi's desire for Rajvardhan increases. Later, on Vaidehi's company logo reveal day, Vaidehi expresses that her inspiration is Rajvardhan and hugs him; Kaveri notices and cries. After a few days and constant meetings, Rajvardhan realises his love for Kaveri but decides not to confess.

=== Special episode (2 hours) ===
- 26 February 2023 (Raj-Kaveri's marriage)
- 18 February 2024 (Kaveri is pregnant)

== Cast ==
=== Main ===
- Tanvi Mundle as Kaveri Madhukar Karekar / Kaveri Rajvardhan Mohite - Rajvardhan's wife.
- Vivek Sangle as Rajvardhan Aniruddha Mohite - Kaveri's husband.
- Nivedita Saraf as Ratnamala Aniruddha Mohite - Rajvardhan's mother.
- Janhavi Killekar as Saniya Shripad Dabholkar / Saniya Aditya Mohite - Aditya's wife.

=== Recurring ===
- Tushar Dalvi as Aniruddha Mohite - Rajvardhan's father.
- Amit Rekhi as Aditya Sudarshan Mohite - Rajvardhan's cousin.
- Sudesh Mhashlikar as Sudarshan Mohite - Aditya's father, Rajvardhan's uncle, Aniruddha's younger brother.
- Nandini Vaidya as Aakanksha Sudarshan Mohite - Aditya's mother, Rajvardhan's aunt.
- Purva Phadke as Vaidehi Pradhan - Kaveri's friend.
- Bhagyashree Dalvi as Piyu Sudarshan Mohite - Aditya's younger sister, Rajvardhan's cousin.
- Atul Mahajan as Madhukar Karekar - Kaveri's father.
- Nilesh Ranade as Bachchu - Ratnamala's younger brother.
- Sayali Jathar as Gauri Madhukar Karekar - Kaveri's stepsister.
- Surabhi Bhave-Damle as Suvarna Shripad Dabholkar - Saniya's mother.
- Yogesh Kelkar as Shripad Dabholkar - Saniya's father.
- Sakshi Paranjape as Sulabha Madhukar Karekar - Gauri's mother, Kaveri's stepmother.
- Sanjeevani Jadhav as Mangala - Sulabha's mother, Kaveri's stepgrandmother.
- Rajesh Deshpande as Uday Tarde
- Vinesh Ninnurkar as Sujay
- Vidisha Mhaskar as Kimaya
- Mrudula Kulkarni as Gabrielle
