= Masoom (1996 film) =

- Poster of Masoom
- Directed by: Mahesh Kothare
- Screenplay by: Ram Kelkar
- Based on: Majha Chhakula by Mahesh Kothare
- Produced by: Sanjay Bali; Lokesh Bali
- Starring: Tinnu Anand; Ayesha Jhulka; Renuka Shahane; Inder Kumar; Sulabha Arya; Arun Bakshi; Laxmikant Berde; Suresh Oberoi
- Cinematography: Sameer Athalye
- Edited by: Vishwas - Anil
- Music by: Anand Raj Anand (also lyricist); Ashok Sharma (background music)
- Release date: May 24, 1996
- Running time: 154 minutes
- Country: India
- Language: Hindi

Masoom (transl. The Innocent) is a 1996 Indian Hindi-language action film directed by Mahesh Kothare. It is a remake of the director's 1994 hit Marathi film Majha Chakula. The film was a super hit at the domestic box office.

== Plot ==
Kishan is the only son of Yashoda and Vikram Singh. Vikram is killed by a gangster Barood. A youngster named Akash is an investigative journalist. At any cost he wants Barood to be arrested and punished. Kishan gets kidnapped by Barood and from here, starts the roller coster ride of Kishan who cleverly escapes Barood's clutches and saves the country and makes his mother proud.

== Cast ==
- Inder Kumar as Akash
- Ayesha Jhulka as Chanda
- Omkar Kapoor as Child Kishan Singh
- Tinnu Anand as Hawaldar Bheem Singh
- Renuka Shahane as Yashoda Vikram Singh
- Laxmikant Berde as Jeetu
- Suresh Oberoi as Vikram Singh
- Mohan Joshi as Barood
- Sulabha Arya
- Arun Bakshi as Chanda's father
- Arun Bali as Police Commissioner Vishal Chauhary
- Sonali Arora as Child Sonali
- Rasik Dave as Inspector Chauhan
- Sameer Kakkar
- Jugnu
- Baldev Ingavale
- Anil Nagrath
- Bhalchandra Kulkarni
- Mahesh Gupta
- Yusuf Bawa
- Sachin Goswami
- Manoj Bhatia
- Sambha Aeira
- Murli
- Ashok Mane
- Master Manan
- Master Kunal

== Soundtrack ==
Masoom

Soundtrack album by Anand Raj Anand
- Released: February 1996
- Genre: Feature film soundtrack
- Length: 38:39
- Label: Tips Music

This album is composed by Anand Raj Anand. Most popular songs in album "Yeh Jo Teri Payalon Ki Chan Chan Hai", "Tukur Tukur Dekhte Ho Kya", "Chota Bachcha Jaan Ke", etc.

#	Song	Singer
1	"Chota Bachcha Jaan Ke"	Aditya Narayan
2	"Kaale Libaas Mein Badan"	Udit Narayan
3	"So Jaa Mere Laadle"	Abhijeet, Kavita Krishnamurthy
4	"So Jaa Mere Laadle" (Sad)	Abhijeet, Kavita Krishnamurthy
5	"Tukur Tukur Dekhte Ho Kya" (Not included in film)	Kumar Sanu, Poornima
6	"Yeh Jo Teri Payalon Ki Chan Chan Hai"	Abhijeet, Sadhana Sargam
7	"Zindagi Ko Jina Hai To"	Jolly Mukherjee, Anand Raj Anand, Arun Bakshi, Sadhana Sargam
8	"Zindagi Ko Jeena Hai Toh" (Sad)	Jolly Mukherjee, Anand Raj Anand, Arun Bakshi, Sadhana Sargam

== Reception ==
This film was released on 114 screens in theaters on May 24, 1996. Inder made his film debut with this film. The film was made on a budget of 1.80 crore and it was a superhit, with a worldwide collection of 8.95 crore.

== Awards ==
- Aditya Narayan won the Screen Award Special Jury Award in 1997 for his song Chhota Baccha Jaan Ke
