= Pheka Pheki =

- Poster
- Directed by: Bipin Varti
- Written by: Mulraj Rajda
- Based on: Aaj Ki Taaza Khabar (1973)
- Produced by: Chelaram Bhatia; Laalchand Bhatia
- Starring: Ashok Saraf; Savita Prabhune; Laxmikant Berde; Nivedita Joshi Saraf; Chetan Dalvi; Pratibha Goregaonkar; Ajay Wadhavkar
- Music by: Anil Mohile
- Production company: Glamour Films
- Distributed by: Everest Entertainment
- Release date: 28 December 1989 (Maharashtra)
- Running time: 154 minutes
- Country: India
- Language: Marathi

Pheka Pheki (translation: Cheating) is a 1989 Indian Marathi-language comedy film written by Mulraj Rajda, directed by Bipin Varti, produced by Chelaram Bhatia and Laalchand Bhatia under the production banner of Glamour Films and distributed by Everest Entertainment. Released in Maharashtra on 28 December 1989, the film stars an ensemble cast of Ashok Saraf, Laxmikant Berde, Savita Prabhune, Nivedita Joshi Saraf, Chetan Dalvi, Pratibha Goregaonkar and Ajay Wadhavkar. The music was composed by Anil Mohile. The film was remade in Hindi as Golmaal Returns and itself core plot have been inspired by 1973 Hindi film Aaj Ki Taaza Khabar.

== Plot ==
A married man, Rajan Pradhan (Ashok Saraf), is stranded in a giant wheel with an attractive young woman, Rekha (Nivedita Joshi Saraf), due to a power failure. He arrives home the next day and meets his very suspicious wife, Vijaya (Savita Prabhune), who thinks he has been up to no good. She refuses to believe his story about the stalled giant wheel, forcing Rajan to invent a story about spending the night with his fictitious friend named Anthony Gonsalves. Vijaya, however, refuses to believe once again that he ever has a friend by that name, and decides to send Anthony a telegram to come and visit her. Rajan then convinces his America-returned friend, Sanjay Phadke (Laxmikant Berde), to pretend to be Anthony and convince Vijaya that he was telling the truth indeed. Sanjay agrees, and everything goes according to plan until a real and amorous Anthony Gonsalves (Chetan Dalvi) shows up, resulting in hilarious chaos.

== Cast ==
- Ashok Saraf as Rajan Pradhan
- Savita Prabhune as Vijaya Pradhan
- Laxmikant Berde as Sanjay Phadke / Anthony Gonsalves (fake)
- Nivedita Joshi as Rekha Phadke
- Chetan Dalvi as Anthony Gonsalves
- Pratibha Goregaonkar as Rosie Gonsalves
- Ajay Wadhavkar as Bagaram
- Aradhana Deshpande as Rashmi (Vijaya's younger sister)
- Uday Tikekar as Captain Prataprao Tophkhane (Rashmi's fiancée)

== Release ==
=== Theatrical ===
The film was theatrically released on 28 December 1989.

=== Home media ===
The film is originally available on Amazon Prime Video.

== Reception ==
The film received 7 out of 10 critics rating at the Bollywood Hungama.

== Soundtrack ==
Pheka Pheki

Soundtrack album by Anil Mohile
- Released: 1989
- Genre: Feature film soundtrack
- Length: 16:20
- Language: Marathi
- Label: Ishtar Music

The music is composed by Anil Mohile and lyrics by Pravin Danve.

Track listing
No.	Title	Singer (s)	Length
1	"Cheduya Prem Gane"	Sudesh Bhosale, Vinay Mandke, Jyotsna Hardikar	4:50
2	"Porinchya Pathi Pathi"	Anil Mohile, Sudesh Bhosale	4:11
3	"Hath Pay Jodato" (Part 1)	Sudesh Bhosale, Priya Khandekar	3:46
4	"Hath Pay Jodato" (Part 2)	Sudesh Bhosale, Priya Khandekar	3:47
