= Khatarnak (2000 film) =

- Theatrical release poster
- Directed by: Mahesh Kothare
- Written by: Shivram Gorle
- Produced by: Vidya Bacchewar
- Starring: Mahesh Kothare; Laxmikant Berde; Johnny Lever; Bharat Jadhav; Avinash Narkar
- Cinematography: Sameer Athalye
- Edited by: Sanjay Dabke
- Music by: Raamlaxman
- Production companies: L. K Films and Studios
- Distributed by: Vaibhavlaxmi Films
- Release date: 3 October 2000
- Running time: 118 minutes
- Country: India
- Language: Marathi
- Box office: ₹90 lakh

Khatarnak (transl. Dangerous) is a 2000 Indian Marathi-language action comedy film directed by Mahesh Kothare and produced by Vidya Bacchewar featuring Mahesh Kothare, Laxmikant Berde, Johnny Lever, Bharat Jadhav, Avinash Narkar, Nutan Jayant, Aarti Chandorkar, Sadashiv Amrapurkar in lead roles. The music is composed by Raamlaxman.

== Plot ==
In a town plagued by mysterious murders every Amavasya, Inspector Pratap Tungare leads the investigation, with CID Inspector Mahesh Chaudhari's assistance. Tungare holds a grudge against criminal lawyer Advocate Potbhare, who has a history of defending Tungare's arrested suspects. Adding complexity, Potbhare's daughter loves local detective Laxmikanth Lokhande (Lakshya). The latest victim, Raosaheb Nimbalkar, prompts a reward announcement by his brother Bapusaheb. In a twist, Lakshya and his assistant Ranga devise a plan: frame Lakshya as the murderer, collect the reward, and then use it to secure Lakshya's release with Potbhare's legal aid. It's a convoluted scheme in the pursuit of truth and, perhaps, personal gain.

== Cast ==
- Mahesh Kothare as CID Inspector Mahesh Chaudhari
- Laxmikant Berde as Laxmikant Lokhande
- Johnny Lever as Inspector Pratap Tungare
- Bharat Jadhav as Rangya
- Sadashiv Amrapurkar as Advocate Raja Potbhare
- Nutan Jayant as Vasanti Pobhare
- Aarti Chandorkar as Gauri Tungare
- Avinash Narkar as Bapusaheb Nimbalkar
- Kishori Ambiye as Nalini Sontakke
- Shahji Kale as Sudhakar Sontakke
- Raj Shekhar as Dadasaheb Desai
- Ravindra Berde as Bhikoba a.k.a. Bhiku
- Sharad Bhutadiya as Raosaheb Nimbalkar
- Dinkar Inamdar as Yashwantrao Dabade
- Mahesh Kokate as Hawaldar More
- Ambar Kothare as Commissioner
- Bhalchandra Kulkarni as Aamdar Saheb
- Surekha Punekar as Lavani Dancer in the song "Kasar Dada Sangu Kitida"

== Casting ==
This is the twelfth film of Kothare and Berde together. The film marked debut of Johnny Lever and Bharat Jadhav. This is also the first film of actresses Nutan Jayant and Aarti Chandorkar. Kothare initially considered Ashok Saraf for the film and gave him the script to read. However, Ashok didn't find it appealing and declined, prompting Kothare to cast Johnny Lever instead.

== Soundtrack ==
Music is composed by Raamlaxman and lyrics were written by Pravin Davane.

No.	Title	Singer(s)	Length
1.	"Aga Vasanti Tujhya Manat"	Tyagraj Khadilkar	06:49
2.	"Kasar Dada Sangu Kitida"	Vaijayanti Limaye	06:40
3.	"Khatarnak Ratra Aahe"	Ranjana Joglekar, Prathima Rao	09:27
4.	"Tu Hukumachi Rani Mi"	Vinod Rathod, Prathima Rao	05:16
5.	"Tujhya Bhaktanna Vijayache"	Ravindra Bijur, Prathima Rao	05:32
Total length:			9:56
