= Ajay Wadhavkar =

Hindi actor

- Born: 1955; Bombay, Bombay State, India
- Died: 27 February 2015 (aged 59–60); Pune, Maharashtra, India
- Occupation: Actor
- Years active: 1983–2014
- Notable work: Nukkad

Ajay Wadhavkar was a Hindi and Marathi film and television actor.

== Career ==
Wadhavkar's notable TV serial roles include that of the bumbling cop Ganpat Hawaldar, from the yesteryear milestone TV serial Nukkad in 1986, directed by Kundan Shah and Saeed Akhtar Mirza, and in the TV serial Pavitra Rishta, where he played Sushant Singh Rajput (Manav)s' father. He was also a part of movies like Yes Boss (1997) and English Babu Desi Mem (1996).

== Filmography ==
=== Television ===
- 1986–1987 Nukkad (TV Series) – Ganpat Hawaldaar
- 1989 Circus (TV series)
- 1993 Byomkesh Bakshi (TV Series) (Episode: Chiriya Ghar (Part 1 & 2)) as Dr. Nagendra Pal (credited as Ajay Vadhavkar)
- 1998 Rishtey
- 2002 Avantika
- 2009-2014 Pavitra Rishta as Damodar Rao Deshmukh

=== Films ===
- 1983 Jaane Bhi Do Yaaro (as Ajay Vadhaokar)
- 1984 Mohan Joshi Hazir Ho! – Court Messenger
- 1987 Gammat Jammat-Ruffian/Goon Marathi Film
- 1988 Shahenshah – Shalu's friend (as Ajay Wadhavarkar)
- 1988 Ek Gadi Baaki Anadi Marathi Film
- 1989 Bhrashtachar – Havaldar Victory Ganesh (as Ajay Vadhwakar)
- 1989 ChaalBaaz- Bank Manager (Uncredited)
- 1989 Pheka Pheki – Bagaram Marathi Film
- 1989 Hamaal De Dhamaal – Ganpat Hawaldar Marathi Film
- 1991 Akayla-as Traffic Police Constable (Cameo Role) in the song "Chal Chal Re Chal Meri Ram Piyaari"
- 1991 Ek Full Chaar Half Marathi Film
- 1992 Jeeva Sakha – Pandit Marathi Film
- 1996 English Babu Desi Mem - Ajay Vadhawkar
- 1997 Prithvi
- 1997 Yes Boss
- 1999 Double Gadbad – Lion
- 2000 Phir Bhi Dil Hai Hindustani
- 2000 Le Chal Apne Sang - Ajay Wadhawakar
- 2003 Fun2shh... Dudes in the 10th Century – Constable Sakharam
- 2010 Asa Mi Tasa Mi- Police Constable Palav

== Death ==
Ajay was diagnosed with diabetes as well as throat cancer and was undergoing treatment at Nanavati hospital in Mumbai, Maharashtra, India. The actor was also facing a financial crisis and Bollywood's popular comic actor Johnny Lever lent him a helping hand. He died on 27 February 2015 in his hometown in Pune, Maharashtra, India.
