= Preminchi Choodu (1965 film) =

1965 film by P. Pullayya

- Theatrical release poster
- Telugu: ప్రేమించి చూడు
- Directed by: P. Pullayya
- Written by: Mullapudi Venkata Ramana (dialogues)
- Screenplay by: P. Pullayya
- Story by: C. V. Sridhar
- Based on: Kadhalikka Neramillai
- Produced by: V. Venkateswarlu
- Starring: Akkineni Nageswara Rao; Jaggayya; Kanchana; Rajasree
- Cinematography: P. L. Roy
- Edited by: N. M. Shankar
- Music by: Master Venu
- Production company: Padmasri Pictures
- Distributed by: Sri Films
- Release date: 24 June 1965
- Running time: 160 mins
- Country: India
- Language: Telugu

Preminchi Choodu (transl. Fall in love and see) is a 1965 Indian Telugu-language romantic comedy film directed by P. Pullayya. It stars Akkineni Nageswara Rao, Jaggayya, Rajasree and Kanchana. The film was produced by V. Venkateswarlu. Music was composed by Master Venu. It is a remake of the Tamil film Kadhalikka Neramillai (1964).

== Plot ==
Buchabbai is a millionaire with two daughters, Kanchanamala and Ratnamala. During their studies away from their hometown, Kanchana falls for a handsome guy, Srinivasa Rao / Vasu, the son of another bigshot Subbarayudu. After their return home, Kanchana and Ratna once squabble with Ranga Rao, the assistant manager of their estate. They persuade their father to sack him; hence Ranga declares a strike in front of their house when Ranga and Ratna are smitten.

Parallelly, Varahala Raju, son of Buchabbai, is passionate about directing a film for which he daily pesters his father. He also loves Meenakshi, the daughter of their manager, Yedukondalu. Right now, Ranga learns that Buchabbai wants to make a prosperous alliance with his daughters. So, he plans and disguises his close friend, Vasu, as his tycoon father, Srinivasa Bhupathi, and makes Buchabbai plead for his nuptials with the support of the girls. Besides, destiny made Subbarayudu and Buchabbai childhood friends, and they decided to knit Kanchana with Vasu.

At first, Vasu gets startled looking at his father therein but feels happy knowing about his wedding. Unfortunately, their play breaks out, so Subbarayadu and Buchabbai file a Police complaint. Being aware of it, Ranga makes a Plan B by posing himself as two. Soon, Buchabbai and Subbarayadu rush to amend their mistake, but it is too late as Ranga and Vasu are prisoned. After that, the story takes several comic twists and turns when Ranga and Vasu succeed in marrying their love interests by fooling Buchabbai.

== Cast ==
- Akkineni Nageswara Rao as Ranga Rao
- Kanchana as Kanchanamala
- Rajasree as Ratnamala
- Jaggayya as Srinivasa Rao / Vasu
- Relangi as Buchabbai
- Gummadi as Subbarayudu
- Chalam as Varahala Raj Kapoor
- Allu Ramalingaiah as Manager Yedukondalu
- Dr. Sivaramakrishnayya as Veera Naidu
- Raavi Kondala Rao as Master
- K. V. Chalam as Inspector Subba Rao
- Jagga Rao as S.P.
- Santha Kumari as Santhamma
- Girija as Meenakshi / Laila

== Production ==
The film was a remake of Tamil film Kadhalikka Neramillai (1964), Rajasree reprised her role from the original.

== Music ==
Music was composed by Master Venu. Pullayya insisted Master Venu to retain the tunes from the original film in Telugu, which Venu was not okay with. He expressed his concern to Pullayya's wife Santhakumari who encouraged him having faith in talent. Except for the song "Vennela Reyi", other songs were retained from the original. "Vennela Reyi" was the replacement for the song "Naalam Naalam". This tune was retained despite Pullayya expressing his anger for using a new tune.

Song title	Lyrics	Singers	length
"Medameeda Meda Katti"	Mullapudi Venkata Ramana	P. B. Srinivas	5:49
"Andale Thongi Choose"	C. Narayana Reddy	P. Susheela, L. R. Eswari, Basaveshwar	4:09
"Dorikeru Doragaru"	Sri Sri	Ghantasala, P. Susheela	3:04
"Kalakalalade Kannulu"	Arudra	L. R. Eswari, M. S. Raju	3:39
"Adi Oka Idile"	Acharya Athreya	P. B. Srinivas, P. Susheela	5:04
"Mee Andala Chetulu"	Arudra	P. B. Srinivas	4:54
"Preminchi Choodu Pilla"	Acharya Athreya	Ghantasala	4:07
"Vennela Reyi"	Dasaradhi	P. B. Srinivas, P. Susheela	3:34
