= Mehta Publishing House =

- Status: Operational
- Founded: 1976
- Founder: Anil Mehta
- Successor: Sunil Mehta, Akhil Mehta, Sahil Mehta
- Country of origin: India
- Headquarters location: Pune, Maharashtra
- Key people: Sunil Mehta, Akhil Mehta, Sahil Mehta
- Nonfiction topics: Marathi language and literature
- No. of employees: 40
- Official website: mehtapublishinghouse.com

Mehta Publishing House is based in Pune, Maharashtra, specialising in Marathi language and literature publications. It was established in 1976 by Sunil Mehta, with a focus on Marathi translations of books from English and other Indian languages.
