= Priya Berde =

Indian actress (born 1970)

- Born: Priya Arun Karnataki; 30 July 1970 (age 56); Kolhapur, Maharashtra, India
- Occupation: Actress
- Years active: 1982 – present
- Spouse: Laxmikant Berde (m. 1998; died 2004)
- Children: 2 including Abhinay Berde
- Relatives: Master Vinayak (grandfather); V. Shantaram (maternal grandfather); Nanda (paternal aunt)
- Family: Karnataki family Berde family (by marriage)

Priya Laxmikant Berde (née Arun; born 30 July 1970) is an Indian actress who has worked in several Marathi language films. She is the daughter of actress Lata Arun and wife of actor Laxmikant Berde. She joined Bharatiya Janata Party in 2023.

== Early life ==
Priya started her career as dubbing artist. She is the daughter of Marathi theatre artist Lata Arun and Arun Karnataki. she is also maternal granddaughter of V. Shantaram. Baburao Pendharkar and Bhalji Pendharkar are half-brothers of her father Arun Karnataki. Niece of actress Nanda

== Personal life ==
Priya started dating actor Laxmikant Berde in 1988 after meeting on the set of Rangat Sangat. He was already married at that time. After 10 years, they married in 1998. They have two children, Abhinay Berde and Swanandi Berde.

== Filmography ==
| Year | Title | Role | Language | Notes |
|---|---|---|---|---|
| 1988 | Ashi Hi Banwa Banwi | Kamali | Marathi | |
| 1988 | Rangat Sangat | Phooldani | Marathi | |
| 1988 | Bandiwan Mi Ya Sansari | Young Kamal | Marathi | |
| 1988 | Nashibwan | Gauri | Marathi | |
| 1989 | Ek Gadi Baaki Anadi | Seema Kirkire | Marathi | |
| 1989 | Gharkul Punha Hasave | Priya | Marathi | |
| 1989 | Thartharat | Ganga | Marathi | |
| 1989 | Eeja Beeja Teeja | Amba Bhosale | Marathi | |
| 1989 | Dharla Tar Chavtay | Maggie/Amruta | Marathi | Double role |
| 1989 | De Dhadak Be Dhadak | Dancer | Marathi | |
| 1990 | Ghanchakkar | Manu | Marathi | |
| 1990 | Dhamaal Bablya Ganpyachi | Malan | Marathi | |
| 1990 | Dokyala Taap Nahi | Ranjana | Marathi | |
| 1990 | Lapwa Chhapwi | Meena | Marathi | |
| 1990 | Kuthe Kuthe Shodhu Mi Tila | Nalini/Nale | Marathi | |
| 1991 | Aflatoon | Baby | Marathi | |
| 1991 | Yeda Ki Khula | Priya | Marathi | |
| 1991 | Aparadhi | Seema | Marathi | |
| 1991 | Shame to Shame | Pallavi Dadarkar / Shevanta Othurkar | Marathi | |
| 1991 | Ek Full Chaar Half | Radha | Marathi | |
| 1991 | Maskari | Rani | Marathi | |
| 1992 | Deedar | Sheela | Hindi | Bollywood debut |
| 1992 | Sone Ki Zanjeer | Basanti | Hindi | |
| 1992 | Beta | Champa | Hindi | |
| 1992 | Ek Hota Vidushak | Guest appearance | Marathi | |
| 1993 | Anari | Bijli | Hindi | |
| 1993 | Sarech Sajjan | Sonali | Marathi | |
| 1993 | Ram Rahim | Guest appearance | Marathi | |
| 1994 | Hum Aapke Hain Koun..! | Chameli | Hindi | |
| 1994 | Bajrangachi Kamal | Maina | Marathi | |
| 1994 | Sonyachi Mumbai | Sakhu | Marathi | |
| 1995 | Guddu | Baliya's wife | Hindi | |
| 1995 | Dhamaal Jodi | Swati | Marathi | |
| 1995 | Gandh Mateecha | Paula | Marathi | |
| 1996 | Jaan | Dhanno | Hindi | |
| 2000 | Chimani Pakhar | Priya Pendse | Marathi | Special appearance |
| 2006 | Jatra | Bakulabai/ Akka | Marathi | |
| 2006 | Deva Shappath Khot Sangen Khar Sangar Nahi | Janaki | Marathi | |
| 2006 | Gruhalaxmi | Dancer | Marathi | |
| 2007 | Zabardast | Judge of Jodi Zabardast | Marathi | Special appearance |
| 2008 | Full 3 Dhamaal | Prema Tofhkhane | Marathi | |
| 2008 | Dum Dum Diga Diga | Priya | Marathi | |
| 2008 | Tujhya Majhya Sansarala Ani Kay Hava | Yashoda | Marathi | |
| 2008 | Sakkha Savatra | Vaishali | Marathi | |
| 2009 | Mata Ekvira Navsala Pavli | Suman | Marathi | |
| 2009 | Jogwa | Shevanta | Marathi | |
| 2009 | Topi Ghala Re | Priya | Marathi | |
| 2009 | Lagli Paij | Yojana | Marathi | |
| 2010 | Chal Dhar Pakad | Shanta | Marathi | |
| 2010 | Natarang | Yamunabai Satarkar | Marathi | |
| 2011 | Ashi Fasli Na Nanachi Tang | Nani Nana Joshi | Marathi | |
| 2011 | Tamaasha Haach Khel Udya | Yamunabai | Marathi | |
| 2011 | Superstar | Herself | Marathi | Cameo |
| 2012 | Bokad | Teacher | Marathi | |
| 2012 | The Strugglers – Amhi Udyache Hero | | Marathi | |
| 2012 | Uchla Re Uchla | Seema | Marathi | |
| 2013 | Yoddha | | Marathi | |
| 2013 | Mala Anna Vhaychay | Anna's wife | Marathi | |
| 2014 | Premacha Jholjhaal | Heera | Marathi | |
| 2016 | Laal Ishq | Rasika | Marathi | |
| 2017 | Ek Maratha Lakh Maratha | Rukhmani | Marathi | |
| 2019 | Rampaat | Kalubai Nagargoje | Marathi | |
| 2019 | Menka Urvashi | Tukaram Patil's wife | Marathi | |
| 2020 | Ahilya - Zunj Ekaki | Ahilya's mother | Marathi | |
| 2022 | Luckdown Be Positive | Rahul's mother | Marathi | |
| 2022 | Varhadi Vajantri | Vijay's Wife | Marathi | |
| 2022 | Lagna Kallol | Maruti's Mother | Marathi | |

== Television ==
| Year | Title | Role | Ref. |
|---|---|---|---|
| 1995 | Padosan | Cameo appearance | |
| 2007 | Nana O Nana | Kadambari | |
| 2010-2011 | Bhagyalakshmi | Jayshree | |
| 2010 | Fu Bai Fu | Contestant | |
| 2012 | Ajunahi Chandraat Aahe | Anay's mother | |
| 2014-2015 | Priti Pari Tujvari | Priti & Pari's mother in law | |
| 2015 | Tu Jivala Guntvave | Ninad's mother | |
| 2022 | Jai Nako Durr Baba | | |
| 2023 | Sindhutai Mazi Mai | Sindhutai's grandmother | |
| 2024 | Mulgi Pasant Aahe | | |
| 2025 | Kajalmaya | Kanakdatta | |
