= Sameer Athalye =

Indian cinematographer

Sameer Athalye is an Indian cinematographer from Mumbai, Maharashtra. He has worked for more than 200 Hindi and Marathi movies since the 1990s. He is married to actress Alka Kubal.

== Filmography ==
- Bharat Aala Parat (2007)
- Kay Dyache Bola (2005)
- Khatarnak (2000)
- Jigar (1998)
- Aisi Bhi Kya Jaldi Hai (1996) (as Sameer Athlye)
- Veer Savarkar
- Navari Mile Navaryala
- Dhumdhadaka
- Masoom (1996)
