= Laxmikant Berde =

Indian actor (1954–2004)

- Born: 26 October 1954; Chanderai, Ratnagiri, Bombay State, India
- Died: 16 December 2004 (aged 50); Mumbai, Maharashtra, India
- Other name: Lakshya
- Occupation: Actor
- Years active: 1984–2004
- Spouses: Roohi Berde (m. 1985; died 1998) Priya Arun (m. 1998)
- Children: 2 (incl. Abhinay Berde)
- Family: Berde family

Laxmikant Berde (26 October 1954 – 16 December 2004) was an Indian actor known for his work in primarily in Marathi theatre and cinema, alongside a long parallel career as a supporting comic actor in Hindi films. Over a career spanning more than two decades, he appeared in an estimated 150 to 185 films and was widely referred to in the Marathi press as the "Superstar of Marathi Cinema" and the "Comedy King" for his high-energy, mannerism-driven comic style. He has received several accolades including, a Maharashtra State Film Award and two Filmfare Awards Marathi.

Berde began his career in the late 1970s working backstage and in minor stage roles for the Mumbai Marathi Sahitya Sangh, before his lead performance in the 1983–84 play Tur Tur established him as a rising comic talent. He made his film debut with Lek Chalali Sasarla (1984) and rose to stardom the following year with Dhum Dhadaka (1985). Through the mid-1980s and 1990s, he became one of the defining figures of the "comedy wave" in Marathi cinema, the Ashok–Lakshya pair's on-screen partnership becoming hits such as Ashi Hi Banwa Banwi (1988), Bhutacha Bhau (1989), Balache Baap Brahmachari (1989), Pheka Pheki (1989) and Aayatya Gharat Gharoba (1991).

In parallel, Berde built a prolific career in Hindi cinema as a supporting comic actor, beginning with Rajshri Productions's Maine Pyar Kiya (1989) and continuing through films such as Saajan (1991), Beta (1992), and Hum Aapke Hain Koun..! (1994), receiving four Filmfare Award nominations for Best Performance in a Comic Role, a record in the category. Though he was best known for comedy, he occasionally sought more dramatic roles, most notably in the National Award-winning Marathi film Ek Hota Vidushak (1992).

Berde died in Mumbai on 16 December 2004, at the age of 50, following a kidney ailment. He is remembered as one of the most popular and influential actors in the history of Marathi cinema, and his on-screen pairing with Ashok Saraf is regarded as among the most successful in Indian regional cinema.

== Early life ==
Laxmikant Berde was born on 26 October 1954 in Bombay (present-day Mumbai), Maharashtra, into a Marathi-speaking, lower-middle-class family. He spent his childhood in a chawl in Girgaon and was the youngest of six siblings, as a child he sold lottery tickets to help with the family income.

Berde's early exposure to performance came through the Ganesh Chaturthi festival celebrations organised by the Konkanastha Vaishya Samaj in Girgaon, where communal stage dramas were staged as part of the festivities. He went on to take part in inter-school and inter-collegiate drama competitions. In the late 1970s, Berde joined the Mumbai Marathi Sahitya Sangh, a theatre production company, initially in a backstage. According to Berde, his first responsibility there was pulling the stage curtains during productions at the auditorium.

== Career ==
Berde began his career taking on minor stage roles while employed at the Mumbai Marathi Sahitya Sangh. His breakthrough came in 1983–84, when playwright-director Purshottam Berde (his cousin brother) cast him in a lead comic role in the Marathi play Tur Tur. The play was a major commercial success, and his performance brought him his first significant recognition on the Marathi stage. He subsequently appeared in several successful plays, including Shantecha Karta Chalu Aahe, Karti Premat Padli, and Uchalbangadi, consolidating his reputation as one of Marathi theatre's leading comic performers during the mid-1980s.

Berde made his film debut in 1984 with the Marathi film Lek Chalali Sasarla opposite Savita Prabhune, for which he won the Filmfare Award for Best Actor – Marathi. The following year, he starred opposite director-actor Mahesh Kothare in Dhum Dhadaka (1985), a major box-office hit that is widely credited with turning him into a star of Marathi cinema; the performance brought him a second consecutive Filmfare Marathi Best Actor award. The Kothare–Berde pairing continued to deliver hits, including De Danadan (1987), and cemented Berde's image as the leading comic actor of the Marathi screen. In 1988, Berde won the Maharashtra State Film Award for Best Actor for his performance in Gholat Ghol.

During this period, Berde also began a long creative partnership with actor Ashok Saraf. Together, the pair, sometimes remembered in the Marathi press as the "Ashok–Lakshya" era, anchored a string of commercially successful comedies, including Bhutacha Bhau (1989), Hamaal De Dhamaal (1989), Changu Mangu (1990), and Aayatya Gharat Gharoba (1991). In 1988, Berde appeared alongside Saraf, Sachin Pilgaonkar, and Kothare in the ensemble comedy Ashi Hi Banwa Banwi, which went on to become one of the most celebrated Marathi films of its era.

Berde's Hindi film debut came in 1989 with Sooraj Barjatya's Maine Pyar Kiya, in which he played a supporting comic role alongside Salman Khan; the film was a nationwide blockbuster and introduced Berde to a pan-Indian audience. The performance earned him his first nomination for the Filmfare Award for Best Performance in a Comic Role. Over the next several years he built a steady career in Bollywood as a comic actor, appearing in Saajan (1991) and 100 Days (1991), the latter bringing a second Filmfare Comic Role nomination, followed by Beta (1992), which brought a third nomination.

Not every venture in this period succeeded. In 1992, seeking to move beyond his comic typecasting, Berde took on a serious dramatic role in the Marathi film Ek Hota Vidushak; the film failed commercially, and by his own and colleagues' accounts he was disappointed by its reception, subsequently returning to the comic roles audiences most closely associated with him. He also continued to work extensively in Marathi cinema through the early 1990s, appearing in Anari (1993), Phool Aur Angaar (1993), and the horror-comedy Zapatlela (1993), a film that drew on his real-life skill as a ventriloquist, playing a man possessed by a malevolent doll.

In 1994, Berde appeared in Hum Aapke Hain Koun..!, one of the biggest Hindi blockbusters of the decade, playing the household servant "Lalloo", a role that became one of his most widely remembered and brought him a fourth Filmfare Comic Role nomination.

Through the mid-to-late 1990s, Berde continued to combine Marathi lead roles with Hindi supporting parts. His Marathi credits from this period include Eka Peksha Ek (1990), Shame To Shame (1991), and Majha Chakula (1994), while his Hindi work included Mere Sapno Ki Rani (1997) and Aarzoo (1999). After roughly seventeen years of playing predominantly comic parts, Berde returned to a serious dramatic role on stage in the play Sir Aali Dhavun, a performance that was well received by critics and audiences and was noted as evidence of range beyond his familiar comic persona.

His final years of film work included the Marathi films Khatarnak (2000), Dekhni Bayko Namyachi (2001), Chimani Pakhar (2003), and Pachadlela (2004), the last notable for its use of digital visual effects, then a novelty in Marathi cinema, as well as the Hindi film Meri Biwi Ka Jawaab Nahin (2004). Director Sachin had also wanted to reunite Berde with Saraf for Navra Maza Navsacha (2004), which would have marked the trio's first collaboration in 14 years since Aayatya Gharat Gharoba (1991); Pilgaonkar has said he wished to cast Berde alongside Saraf, who played the bus conductor Lalu, but that Berde turned the role down on his doctors' advice and it went to another actor instead. In his final years, Berde also established his own production house, Abhinay Arts, named after his son, which he ran together with his wife, Priya.

== Personal life ==
Early in his career, Berde married Marathi actress Roohi Berde in 1983, who had been appearing in Marathi films from the early 1970s. The marriage lasted several years before Roohi's death in 1998 due to brain hemorrhage.

In 1988, while still married to Roohi, Berde met actress Priya Arun, daughter of Marathi theatre artist Lata Arun, on the set of the film Rangat Sangat, and the two subsequently began a relationship. Following Roohi's death, Berde and Priya were together publicly for a number of years before formally marrying in 1998. The couple had two children, a son, Abhinay Berde, and a daughter, Swanandi Berde, both of whom later entered the Marathi entertainment industry.

== Death ==
In his final months, Berde suffered from a serious kidney ailment and underwent dialysis for approximately three months. His condition deteriorated, and he died at his suburban Mumbai home on 16 December 2004, at the age of 50. He was cremated at the Oshiwara crematorium in Jogeshwari West, Mumbai; his funeral was attended by numerous figures from the Marathi film industry. He was survived by his wife, Priya, his son, Abhinay, his daughter, Swanandi.

== Legacy ==
Berde is widely regarded, alongside Ashok Saraf, as one of the two defining figures of the "comedy wave" that dominated Marathi cinema from the mid-1980s to the late 1990s, a period retrospectively known as the "Ashok–Lakshya era." Building on the tradition established by Dada Kondke, the Berde–Saraf partnership became one of the most commercially successful screen pairings in Indian regional cinema. Film historians have also credited Berde, Saraf, Sachin Pilgaonkar, and Mahesh Kothare with helping attract younger urban audiences back to Marathi theatres during a period when the industry was largely associated with rural family dramas. Kothare, who directed and co-starred with Berde in several hits, likened their partnership to Hollywood's famous comic duo, saying, "[We were] the 'Dean Martin and Jerry Lewis' of Marathi cinema", with Berde as the comic half and Kothare as the straight man.

Colleagues frequently praised Berde's comic skill, versatility, and humility. Ashok Saraf said Berde's cross-dressing performance in Ashi Hi Banwa Banwi showed that "Berde's talent that he maintained the dignity of the character and didn't let it turn vulgar", a pitfall Saraf noted was common when actors played women for comic effect. Actor-director Sachin Pilgaonkar said Berde "started his journey from scratch" before going on to "rule Marathi cinema for 15 years." Actress Bhagyashree recalled that although much of the cast of Maine Pyar Kiya were newcomers, "Laxmikant ji was a star on our set," adding that he was "very humble" and "never showed that he came from an industry where he was a superstar." Veteran actress Usha Nadkarni similarly remembered him as an unassuming star: "Laxmikant was a wonderful human being. Despite achieving so much success, he never had any arrogance. He never looked down on anyone or made others feel inferior."

Several actresses who worked extensively with Berde have also highlighted both his importance to Marathi cinema and his character. Nivedita Saraf said in 2025 that the "Marathi cinema industry survived because of Ashok Saraf and Laxmikant Berde," and later summed up his association with comedy by saying "Jithe vinod, tithe Lakshya" ("Where there is comedy, there is Lakshya"). Varsha Usgaonkar said Berde would have flourished across today's multiple entertainment platforms and recalled the dedication he brought to his dramatic role in Ek Hota Vidushak. Although the film won the National Film Award for Best Feature Film in Marathi, Berde received no acting nomination, a point Usgaonkar and later commentators have cited as illustrating the gap between his comic image and his dramatic ambitions. Ashwini Bhave described Berde as "not just a fine performer but a warm-hearted person" who "never put anyone down" and "never let the atmosphere on set turn tense," adding that his presence always created a positive atmosphere on set.

His reputation extended beyond Marathi cinema. At his funeral, comedian Johnny Lever reportedly said, "The king of comedy is no more." Salman Khan later described Berde as "a very close friend" and said he had been "one of the biggest reasons behind the success of Maine Pyar Kiya," adding that a song from Saajan "always reminds me of him." Anil Kapoor has also named Berde among the collaborators from earlier in his career whom he still misses.

Berde himself acknowledged the limitations of his comic image. In a televised interview, he compared an actor's public image to being "trapped in a cage" with three keys held by the audience, the director, and the producer, arguing that an actor could escape typecasting only if all three chose to "turn the key." His energetic, mannerism-driven style became a benchmark for later Marathi comedians, with critics tracing a lineage from Dada Kondke through Ashok Saraf and Berde to performers such as Bharat Jadhav and Makarand Anaspure. His role in Zapatlela (1993) also left a lasting cultural imprint, with the puppet villain Tatya Vinchu becoming an enduring pop-culture figure and inspiring Zapatlela 2 (2013), released nearly a decade after Berde's death. On the tenth and twentieth death anniversaries, critics and family members observed that Berde's popularity had continued to grow. His son, actor Abhinay Berde, remarked: "It'll now be 20 years since my father passed away, and he's still fresh in people's memories, he's a big part of their childhood. There have been people who did greater work than Laxmikant Berde, but they're not remembered with nearly the same amount of love." He also recalled that the poor reception of Ek Hota Vidushak "affected Berde greatly" because "he was a very emotional man... he just loved people and wanted to make them happy."

== Filmography ==
=== Marathi films ===
Year	Title	Role	Notes
1984	Lek Chalali Sasarla	Deepak Waghmare	
1984	Aali Lahar Kela Kahar	Romeo	
1985	Dhum Dhadaka	Laxmikant Wakade alias Lakshya	
1986	Dhakti Sun	Kapil	
1986	Gadbad Ghotala	Pralhad	
1986	Amhi Doghe Raja Rani	Raja Joshi	
1986	Tuzya Wachun Karamena	Dattoba Sankhame	
1987	Irsaal Karti	Bholanath	
1987	Bhatak Bhavani	Kondiba	
1987	Gauraacha Navara	Somu Deshmukh	
1987	Chal Re Lakshya Mumbaila	Lakshya/Bhojraj	
1987	De Danadan	Constable Lakshman Tangmode	
1987	Prem Karuya Khullam Khulla	Shekhar	
1987	Porinchi Dhamal Bapachi Kamal	Vasu	
1987	Khara Kadhi Bolu Naye	Vijay	
1987	Premasathi Vattel Te	Gopi	
1987	Kaltay Pan Valat Nahi	Namdev	
1988	Ashi Hi Banwa Banwi	Parshuram (Parvati)	
1988	Kiss Bai Kiss	Kishan (Kishya)	
1988	Rangat Sangat	Indrajit	
1988	Majjach Majja	Bajirao	
1988	Gholat Ghol	Sachin Damodar	
1988	Nashibwan	Shankar	
1988	Sarvashreshtha	Vijay Deshmukh	
1988	Ek Gadi Baaki Anadi	Raja Pradhan	
1988	Maamla Porincha	Mangesh Kamat	
1989	Balache Baap Brahmachari	Sarang Acharya	
1989	Bhutacha Bhau	Barko	
1989	Thartharat	Laxmikant Ghorpade alias Lakshya	
1989	Hamaal De Dhamaal	Raja Phule	
1989	Pheka Pheki	Sanjay Phadke/ Anthony Gonsalves	
1989	Dharla Tar Chavatay	Mohan Gosavi	
1989	Rajani Vajvala Baja	Khulya	
1989	Chambu Gabale	Chambu Gabale	
1989	Khatyal Sasu Nathal Soon	Bajirao Didhmishe (Bajya)	
1989	Kuthe Kuthe Shodhu Me Tila	Namya	
1989	Utawala Nawara	Gangatam	
1989	Rikshawali	Photographer	
1989	Gharkul Punha Hasave		
1989	Auntie Ne Wazavali Ghanti	Sakharam More (Sakhya)	
1990	Kuldeepak	Rajaram Pant	
1990	Patali Re Patali	Mukund	
1990	Shejari Shejari	Rajesh	
1990	Dhadakebaaz	Laxmikant Hajare (Lakshya) / Gangaram	Dual role
1990	Dhamal Bablya Ganpyachi	Bablunath (Bablya)	
1990	Lapwa Chhapwi	Mohan	
1990	Shubha Bol Narya	Narayan Maharaj	
1990	Dokyala Tap Nahi	Ajay	
1990	Thamb Thamb Jau Nako Lamb	Shiva	
1990	Ejaa Beeja Teeja	Teeja	
1990	Ghabrayacha Nahi	Laxmikant	
1990	Changu Mangu	Mangu Dongre	
1990	Eka Peksha Ek	Kalyan Nashikkar	
1991	Jeeva Sakha	Baadshah	
1991	Aayatya Gharat Gharoba	Kashiram Kasture	
1991	Aflatoon	Babanrao Barshikar/ Baadshah	
1991	Mumbai Te Mauritius	Lakshya	
1991	Yeda Ki Khula	Ajay Deshmukh/ Balasaheb Jagirdar	
1991	Maskari	Raja	
1991	Ek Gaadi Baaki Anadi	Raja Pradhan	
1991	Godi Gulabi	Dilip	
1991	Doctor Doctor	Gopya/ CID Inspector Vijay Desai	
1991	Shame To Shame	Ram /Laxman/ Bhalu/Shantanu	Multiple roles
1991	Ek Full Char Half	Keshav/Krishna/ Kanha/Kanhaiya	Multiple roles
1991	Apradhi		
1992	Ek Hota Vidushak	Aburao/Songadya	Dual role
1992	Jeewlaga	Laxmikant	
1992	Hach Sunbai Cha Bhau	Vishwas Rane (Bhau)	
1992	DeDhadak BeDhadak	Gajanan Korde (Gaja)	
1992	Than Than Gopala	Bandya	
1992	Shubh Mangal Savdhan	Driver	
1992	Sagle Sarkech	Ajay Pawar	
1993	Tu Sukhakarta	Manohar (Manya)	
1993	Zapatlela	Laxmikant "Lakshya" Bolke	
1993	Sarech Sajjan	Hirakanth	
1994	Bajrangachi Kamal	Bajrang Bagde	
1994	Chikat Navra	Dhananjay Nipadkar	
1994	Majha Chakula	Lakshya	
1994	Soniyachi Mumbai	Sonya	
1994	Premachya Sultya Bomba		
1995	Jamla Ho Jamla	Devdutt Ghorpade	
1995	Dhamal Jodi	Ram	
1995	Suna Yeti Ghara	Gopal Sheth	
1995	Topi Var Topi	Shankar Patil	
1995	Hasva Fasvi		
1997	Kamal Majhya Baykochi	Laxmikant Niphadkar	
1998	Bayko Chukali Standvar	Ranga	
1998	Jigar	Vithoba Pawaskar	
1998	Dhangad Dhinga	Laxmikant Kothare	
1998	Janta Janardan	Ashok	
1998	Aapla Lakshya	Lakshya	
1999	Manus	Sakharam Dhondi Yadav	
1999	Saubhagyakankshini	Kisan	
1999	Rang Premacha	Chandu Chinchalkar	
1999	Aai Thor Tujhe Upkar	Inspector Laxmikant	
2002	Dagina	Vakil Jayant Dhasle	
2000	Satvapariksha	Mahesh Deshmukh	
2000	Khatarnak	Laxmikant Lokhande	
2000	Navra Mumbaicha	Lakshya	
2001	Lele Viruddh Lele	Appa Lele	
2001	Dekhni Bayko Namyachi	Namdeo (Namya)	
2001	Saubhagya Kankshini	Kisan	
2002	Maratha Battalion	Raghu	
2002	Chimani Pakhar	Shriyut Pendse	
2002	Aadharstambh	Lakshya Lachke	
2004	Pachhadlela	Vetale Guruji	
2004	Tuzyacha Sathi	Laxmikant	posthumous release

=== Hindi films ===
Year	Movie	Role	Notes
1989	Maine Pyar Kiya	Manohar Singh	
1991	Trinetra	Ajit/Amar/Akbar/Anthony	
1991	100 Days	Balam	
1991	Pratikar	Bal Shastri	
1991	Dancer	Dattu	
1991	Saajan	Laxminandan	
1992	Geet	Pandey	
1992	Anaam	Rajan	
1992	Deedar	Mahesh	
1992	Dil Ka Kya Kasoor	Murali	
1992	Beta	Pandu Dhondu Bhikajirao	
1992	I Love You	Champak	
1992	Parda Hai Parda	Appu Khote	
1992	Kasak	Shayar	
1993	Santaan	Vachani	
1993	Sainik	Guddu	
1993	Gumrah	Pakya	
1993	Phool Aur Angaar	Ramlakhan Tripathi	
1993	Krishan Avtaar	Lallan	
1993	Anari	Raghu	
1993	Dil Ki Baazi	Prem Murali	
1993	Aadmi Khilona Hai	Champaklal	
1993	Hasti	Passenger	
1993	Sangram	Teji	
1993	Tahqiqaat	Hawaldar Sakharam Dandekar	
1994	Brahma	Timepass	
1994	Hum Aapke Hain Koun..!	Lallu Prasad	
1994	Dilbar	Tadipaar	
1994	The Gentleman	Vijay's friend	
1994	Kranti Kshetra	Himself	Special appearance
1994	Janta Ki Adalat	Tukia	
1995	Saajan Ki Baahon Mein	Anand	
1995	Khilona Bana Khalnayak	Laxmikant Bolke	
1995	Criminal	Mangu	
1995	Taqdeerwala	Pandu	
1995	Hathkadi	Pyarelal	
1996	Ajay	Rupaiya	
1996	Chaahat	Bhaaji Rao	
1996	Masoom	Jeetu	
1997	Mere Sapno Ki Rani	Arun	
1997	Zameer: The Awakening of a Soul	Beparwah	
1997	Zor	Pandu	
1997	Dhaal	Inspector	
1997	Hameshaa	Laxmi	
1997	Qahar	Kanta's husband	
1997	Nazar	Lakshya	
1997	Ganga Mange Khoon	Lalu	
1998	Sar Utha Ke Jiyo	Lakhan Tripathi	
1998	Deewana Hoon Pagal Nahi	Narayan	
1998	Hafta Vasuli	Chayavati	
1999	Rajaji	Babaji	
1999	Jaanam Samjha Karo	Shastri	
1999	Aarzoo	Laxmi	
1999	Lo Main Aa Gaya	Lakshya	
1999	Aaag Hi Aag	Baba Bakwas Kalandar	
1999	Dil Kya Kare	Ram Dulare Sinha	
1999	Kahani Kismat Ki	Laxmikant	
2000	Beti No.1	Laxman Bhatnagar	
2000	Papa The Great	Mungherilal	
2000	Sabse Bada Beiman		
2000	Shikaar	Court Martial	
2000	Rahasya - The Suspense		
2001	Hello Girls		
2001	Uljhan	Jamal	
2001	Chhupa Rustam: A Musical Thriller	Manik	
2001	Biwi Aur Padosan	Pandu	
2001	Kaam Granth		
2002	Hum Tumhare Hain Sanam	Hasmukh	
2002	Pyaar Diwana Hota Hai	Wills	
2002	Bharat Bhagya Vidhata	Bus Driver	
2003	Khanjar: The Knife	Pritam	
2003	Baap Ka Baap	Laxmikant	
2003	Tu Bal Bramhachari Main Hoon Kanya Kunwari	Phaltu	
2004	Meri Biwi Ka Jawaab Nahin	Inspector Prakash	
2004	Ghar Grihasti	Lachke	
2004	Patli Kamar Lambe Baal	Hariya	
2005	Insan	Laxman Munde	posthumous release

=== Dubbing artist ===
Title	Year	Actor	Notes
1996	Hindustani	Goundamani	

=== Theatre plays ===
- Thamb Taklya Bhang Padto (1976)
- Abab Vithoba Bolu lagala (1977)
- Tur Tur (1983)
- Gharat Hasare Tare (1983)
- Pandit Ata Tari Shahane Vha (1983)
- Shantecha Karta Chalu Aahe (1983)
- Bighadale Swargache Daar
- Ashvamedh
- Sir Aale Dhaun
- Karti Premat Padli
- Lele Viruddha lele
- Nanda Saukhya Bhare
- Uchalbangadi

== Accolades ==
Year	Award	Category	Film	Result	Ref.
1985	Filmfare Awards Marathi	Best Actor – Marathi	Lek Chalali Sasarla	Won	
1986	Filmfare Awards Marathi	Best Actor – Marathi	Dhoom Dhadaka	Won	
1988	Maharashtra State Film Awards	Best Actor	Gholat Ghol	Won	
1990	Filmfare Awards	Best Performance in a Comic Role	Maine Pyar Kiya	Nominated	
1992	Filmfare Awards	Best Performance in a Comic Role	100 Days	Nominated	
1993	Filmfare Awards	Best Performance in a Comic Role	Beta	Nominated	
1995	Filmfare Awards	Best Performance in a Comic Role	Hum Aapke Hain Koun..!	Nominated	
