= Aajcha Divas Majha =

- Directed by: Chandrakant Kulkarni
- Story by: Ajit Dalvi; Prashant Dalvi
- Produced by: Puja Chhabria
- Starring: Sachin Khedekar; Ashwini Bhave; Mahesh Manjrekar; Hrishikesh joshi Pushkar Shrotri
- Cinematography: Rajan Kothari
- Edited by: Rahul Bhatankar
- Music by: Ashok Patki; Mangesh Dhadke
- Distributed by: Everest Entertainment Pvt. Ltd.
- Release date: 29 March 2013
- Country: India
- Language: Marathi

Aajcha Divas Majha (transl. Today is mine) is a Marathi-language political drama film released on 29 March 2013. Produced by Puja Chhabria and directed by Chandrakant Kulkarni. The film stars Sachin Khedekar, Ashwini Bhave,Mahesh Manjrekar, Anand Ingale. The film's music is by Ashok Patki and Mangesh Dhadke.

The film is based on a political background with a compassionate story.

== Plot ==
The movie depicts a morally stricken chief minister who works to help a beleaguered elderly singer who is yet to receive the government allotted flat they applied for eight years ago.

The story line depicts original characters such as the chief minister, his wife, his personal assistant, the principal secretary and many personnel from the assembly. It depicts the political decision-making process and also looks at the conflict between politicians and bureaucrats within the government system.

== Cast ==
- Sachin Khedekar as Vishwashrao Mohite
- Ashwini Bhave as Mrs. Mohite
- Mahesh Manjrekar as Mr. Rahimatpurkar
- Hrishikesh joshi as PD Shinde
- Pushkar Shrotri as Munir
- Anand Ingle as Bagve
- Samir Choughule as Mr Satam

== Crew ==
- Director - Chandrakant Kulkarni
- Story - Ajit Dalvi and Prashant Dalvi
- Producer - Puja Chhabria
- Cinematographer - Rajan Kothari
- Art Director - Eknath Kadam
- Music Director - Ashok Patki, Mangesh Dhadke
- Lyricist - Dasoo

== Awards ==
- Winner - National Film Award for Best Marathi Feature Film (2014)

== Soundtrack ==
The music has been directed by Ashok Patki and Mangesh Dhadke, while the lyrics have been provided by Dasoo.

=== Track listing ===
No.	Title	Length
1.	"Tuza Gandha"	4:58
2.	"Manat Yeil Te Te Hoyeel"	4:32
