= Tukaram (film) =

- Theatrical poster for Tukaram
- Directed by: Chandrakant Kulkarni
- Written by: Ajit Dalvi; Prashant Dalvi
- Screenplay by: Ajit Dalvi and Prashant Dalvi
- Story by: Ajit Dalvi and Prashant Dalvi
- Produced by: Sanjay Chhabria
- Starring: Jitendra Joshi; Padmanabh Gaikwad; Prateeksha Lonkar; Radhika Apte; Veena Jamkar; Sharad Ponkshe; Yatin Karyekar; Vrishasen Dabholkar
- Narrated by: Sachin Khedekar
- Cinematography: Rajen Kothari
- Edited by: Ballu Saluja
- Music by: Ashok Patki; Avadhoot Gupte
- Production company: Everest Entertainment
- Distributed by: Everest Entertainment
- Release date: 8 June 2012
- Country: India
- Language: Marathi

Tukaram is a 2012 Marathi biopic on the life of Saint Tukaram, who was a 17th-century Varkari saint, spiritual poet and devotee of Vitthala. The film was directed by Chandrakant Kulkarni.

The 1936 Marathi film Sant Tukaram by directors Vishnupant Govind Damle and Sheikh Fattelal under the banner of Prabhat Film Company became the first Indian film to receive an award at the 5th Venice International Film Festival. The film still remains popular and is the subject of frequent studies. This was also the first film to capture the life of Tukaram. The 2012 film that was released after 76 years is the second film in Marathi based on the same subject. The subject was also inspiration for Kannada film Santa Thukarama (1963) and Telugu film Bhakta Tukaram (1973).

== Cast ==
- Jitendra Joshi as Tukaram
- Padmanabh Gaikwad as young Tukaram
- Veena Jaamkar as Rakhumābāi (Tukaram's first wife)
- Radhika Apte as Aawalibāi (Tukaram's second wife)
- Sharad Ponkshe as Bolhobā Ambile More (Tukaram's father)
- Prateeksha Lonkar as Kanakāi (Tukaram's mother)
- Vikas Patil as Kanha (Tukaram's younger brother)
- Vrishasen Dabholkar as Sāvaji (Tukaram's elder brother)
- Smita Tambe as Manjula (Sāvaji's wife)
- Purnanand Wandhekar as Santu Teli (Tukaram's Friend)
- Vikram Gaikwad as Fakir (Cameo appearance)
- Yatin Karyekar as Mambaji Gosavi
- Samidha Guru as Bahinābāi
- Sakhi Gokhale as Kanha's wife

== Production ==
Tukaram being a revered saint in Maharashtra, his works have been a subject of numerous study. But the film focuses on his life before sainthood. The film was produced by Sanjay Chhabria under the banner Everest Entertainment. The story, screenplay and dialogues for the film were written by Ajit Dalvi and Prashant Dalvi. Through various researches and many re-writings, the screenplay took almost five years to produce. Multiple National Film Award winner Vikram Gaikwad did the makeup of the artists. The costumes were designed by Poornima Oak.

== Music ==
The music of the film is composed by veteran music director Ashok Patki and the new age director Avadhoot Gupte. Singers include Aniruddha Joshi, Dnyaneshwar Meshram, Padmanabh Gaikwad and Janhavi Prabhu Arora along with Avdhoot Gupte. Joshi and Gaikwad have been winners of Marathi Sa Re Ga Ma Pa and Meshram and Arora have been participants in it; all in different seasons. Gaikwad who is the winner of Sa Re Ga Ma Pa Marathi Li'l Champs season 2 also plays the role of young Tukaram in the film. Ashutosh Gowariker launched the music album.

No.	Title	Lyrics	Music	Singer(s)	Length
1.	"Ganya Manya Tuka"	Dasu Vaidya	Avadhoot Gupte	Padmanabh Gaikwad, Sharayu Date, Avadhoot Gupte	4:41
2.	"Jaganyacha Paya"	Dasu Vaidya	Ashok Patki	Dnyaneshwar Meshram, Chorus	3:14
3.	"Kaal Hale Varsh Sare"	Dasu Vaidya	Avadhoot Gupte	Avadhoot Gupte, Janhavi Prabhu Arora, Aniruddha Joshi	2:56
4.	"Kabir Doha"	Kabir	Ashok Patki	Avadhoot Gupte	1:34
5.	"Korad Aabhal"	Dasu Vaidya	Ashok Patki	Hariharan	4:06
6.	"Laadaki Sun Majhi"	Traditional	Ashok Patki	Chorus	1:02
7.	"Ovee"	Traditional	Ashok Patki	Jai Deshmukh	1:10
8.	"Sada Majhe Dola"	Tukaram	Ashok Patki	Aniruddha Joshi	2:08
9.	"Vrukshvalli Aamha Soyare"	Tukaram	Ashok Patki	Aniruddha Joshi	5:35
10.	"Waari Geet"	Tukaram	Ashok Patki	Dnyaneshwar Meshram, Aniruddha Joshi, Chorus	7:30
Total length:					33:56

== Awards ==
Screen Awards Marathi 2012

- Best Film
- Best Director - Chandrakant Kulkarni
