= Bhet =

- Theatrical release poster
- Directed by: Chandrakant Kulkarni
- Produced by: Chandrakant Kulkarni Nitin Patil Umesh Bagul
- Starring: Prateeksha Lonkar; Atul Kulkarni; Shreyas Talpade; Tushar Dalvi; Apoorva Koregave; Deepa Shriram; Umesh Kamat; Priya Bapat; Mohan Joshi; Vandana Gupte; Vijay Divan; Manjusha Godase; Kimaya Chaubal; Pratiksha Khanuilkar
- Music by: Ashok Patki
- Release date: 31 May 2002
- Country: India
- Language: Marathi

Bhet is a 2002 Indian Marathi-language film co-produced and directed by Chandrakant Kulkarni.

== Plot ==
Sudha was married earlier to Bhau but they divorce. She then marries Satish and has young daughter, Manu. Bhau is also married now. Sudha and Bhau have a 12 year old son Ananda who is staying with his grandmother, uncle and aunt in Nagpur. It has been 8 years since she left and he does not remember her clearly. Sudha also remembers him. Ananda wants to meet his mother, and manages to get Sudha's address. He sends a letter to her. She wants to meet Ananda. But such meeting is not going to be easy with opposition by families. They struggle and meet at the end.

== Cast ==
- Prateeksha Lonkar as Sudha
- Atul Kulkarni as Bhausaheb
- Shreyas Talpade
- Tushar Dalvi as Satish
- Deepa Shriram Lagoo- Bhausaheb's mother
- Suhas Joshi- Sudha's mother
- Mohan Joshi
- Vandana Gupte
- Vijay Divan
- Umesh Kamat
- Manjusha Godase
- Kimaya Chaubal
- Pratiksha Khanuilkar
- Priya Bapat (child artist)
- Apoorva Koregave (child artist) as Ananda

== Soundtrack ==
The music has been directed by Ashok Patki, while the lyrics were written by Vinayak Rahatekar.

=== Track listing ===
No.	Title	Performer(s)	Length
1.	"Devoo Prem Ghevu Prem"	Preeti Sagar	06:19
2.	"Hasoo Doloo Nachoo"	Preeti Sagar	06:14
3.	"He Man"	Preeti Sagar	05:16
4.	"Hi Sanjevela Nasheela"	Preeti Sagar	06:12
5.	"Nachu Gavu Sarejan"	Preeti Sagar	03:47
6.	"Saaja Na Aata"	Preeti Sagar	05:21

== Awards ==
Atul Kulkarni won the Maharashtra State Government Award for Best Actor in Supporting Role.
