= Anand Kale =

Indian actor

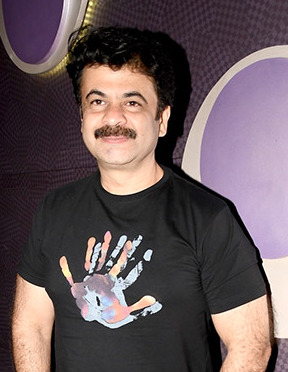
- Kale in 2019
- Education: Shivaji University, Kolhapur
- Occupation: Actor
- Years active: 1988 - Present
- Notable work: Swarajyarakshak Sambhaji; Majhi Tujhi Reshimgath'; Char Divas Sasuche
- Awards: Zee Marathi Award for Best Supporting Actor (Male) Filmfare Awards Nomination for Best Actor (Male)
- Website: www.annandkale.com

Anand Kale (also spelt Aanand Kale) is an Indian actor, theater artist & producer who works primarily in the Marathi Cinema, Theater & Marathi television as well as Hindi and international Productions. He is best known for his portrayals of Kondaji Baba in the historical drama Swarajyarakshak Sambhaji and Vishwajeet in the romantic drama Majhi Tujhi Reshimgath. He is also well known for his role in the Marathi TV show on ETV Marathi called Char Diwas Sasuche, where he played the character Ashok Deshmukh for 3,600 episodes. He has also worked in Hindi films such as P Se PM Tak and the Hollywood film Remember Amnesia. He has performed record break 125 shows of marathi play “Amchya ‘Hi’ cha Prakaran” Mr Kale is a prominent face of the cultural movement of Kolhapur. Anand is very much active for Keshvrao Bhosale Natyagruh & Kolhapur Chitranagari development. He is a line producer for Laxman Utekar’s Shraddha Kapoor & Ranadeep Hooda starer Eetha, He appears in the Marathi Movie Kapbashi with Nirmiti Sawant, Pooja Sawant & Tula Pahata. In 2026, Mr Kale Produced Marathi Comedy Play Shreeman Shreemati in which he also performed lead role. The play features Resham Tipnis and Dhanashri Kadgaonkar in the principal roles alongside kale. This play explores contemporary relationships and changing expectations between the generations on which Mr kale has express earlier.

== Early and personal life ==
Anand Kale completed his early education in Kolhapur at Maisaheb Bawdekar School and Private High School. He graduated with a Bachelor of Commerce (B.Com) degree from D.R.K. College. During his school and college years, he won several awards in football.

Anand married his College Friend Radhika in 1995. They have two Sons, Yash and Neel.

Mr Kale is performing in Marathi theater since his college days. From 1988 he has been winning awards for acting in Rajya Natya Spardha, Kamgar Kalyan Natya Spardha and various one-act compilations. From 1998 he started his career in Marathi films and from Char Diwas Sasuche (Character Ashok Deshmukh) he started his career in Marathi Television. Where he has completed more than 7000 episodes of various serials.

Apart from acting, he has a keen interest in motorcycle riding. He completed a long-distance journey from Kashmir to Kanyakumari on his Kawasaki Ninja 1000 motorcycle. He has also been active in the hotel business for the past 25 years.

Kale has contributed to the culture and society of Kolhapur and has consistently worked towards the development of Kolhapur Chitranagari. He also led a movement for the reconstruction of the Keshavrao Bhosale Natyagriha.

== Career ==
Kale gained significant recognition for his role as Kondaji Farzand (Kondaji Baba) in the series Swarajyarakshak Sambhaji. Following this, he portrayed the character of Vishwajeet (popularly known as Vishwajeet Kaka) in the Zee Marathi serial Majhi Tujhi Reshimgath. For this performance, he won the award for Best Supporting Character (Male) at the Zee Marathi Awards.

During the filming of Majhi Tujhi Reshimgath, Kale was also involved in international projects. In 2022, it was reported that he had been cast in a Hollywood production. To manage his commitments, he reportedly traveled from Leh, where he was engaged in other work, back to Mumbai specifically to complete his scenes for the Marathi television series. Later that year, he took a temporary break from the show.

He has been a hotelier for more than 25 years.

== Filmography ==
=== Films ===
Year	Tittle	Role	Ref
1999	Ghe Bharari	Ravindra Sarnobat	
1999	Maherchi Pahuni	Anand Kale	
	Jay Maharashtra		
2009	Zak Marali Bayko Keli		
2008	Jai Mohata Devi	Keshavlal	
2008	Aaba Zindabad	Yuvraj Patil	
2018	Redio Nights		
2015	P Se PM Tak	Mukund Desai	
2019	Remember Amnesia	Samir	
2022	Oh My Ghost	as King	
	Kapbashi		
2026	Cup Bashi	Shrikant Paradkar	
2026	Tula Pahata	as Sagar's father	

=== Television ===
Year		Title	Role	Ref.
2001- 2012	ETV	Char Diwas Sasuche	Ashok Deshmukh	
2006-2007	ETV	Soniyacha Umbara		
2006	Zee TV Marathi	Vahinisaheb	Vikram Gadkari	
2007		Jeevalaga		
2008-2009		Vrundawan		
2010	Star Prawah	Don kinare Doghi Apan		
2013-2016	Colors Marathi	Asawa Sunder Swapnancha Bungala		
2016-2017	Colors Marathi	Tuzya Wachun Karmena	Sherkhan (Mr Deshmukh)	
2017	Zee Marathi	Dil Dosti Dobara	Shirish Pradhan	
2017-2018	Zee Marathi	Jadubai Jorat	Suryakant Samant	
2017-2020	Zee TV	Swarajyarakshak Sambhaji	Kondaji Baba	
2019-2020	Sony Marathi	Swarajya Janani Jijamata	Prataprao Gujar	
2020-2023	Star Prawah	Mulagi Zali Ho		
2021-2022	Sony Marathi	Swarajya Saudamini Tararani	Hambirrao Mohite	
2022	Colors Marathi	Lek Mazi Durga		
2021–2022	Zee TV	Majhi Tujhi Reshimgath	Vishwajeet (Kaka)	
2021- 2023	Sun TV	Sant Gajanan Shegaviche	Vajrabhushan Chandorkar	
2024-2025	Star Prawah	Gharoghari Matichya Chuli	Adv Nimbalkar	

== Awards and nominations ==
Year	Award	Category	Work	Result	Ref.
1999	Filmfare Awards	Best Actor Male	Ghe Bharari	Nominated	
2017	Sanskruti Kaladarpan Awards	Best Supporting Character (Male)	Sherkhan - Tuzya Wachun Karmena	Won	
2022	Zee Marathi Awards	Best Supporting Character (Male)	Majhi Tujhi Reshimgath	Won	
