= Prateeksha Lonkar =

Indian actress

- Born: 22 May 1968 (age 58); Aurangabad, Maharashtra, India
- Occupation: Actress
- Years active: 1991–present
- Spouse: Prashant Dalvi (m. 1990)

Prateeksha Lonkar is an Indian actress who mostly appeared in Hindi and Marathi films and television series. She is best known for playing the lead title role in the Marathi TV serial Damini, that aired on DD Sahyadri.

== Early life ==
Lonkar's father was a doctor and her mother a teacher. After finishing her schooling till 10th, she opted for Arts and followed her interest in theatre. Initially she was successful in Aurangabad, then she travelled to Mumbai.

== Career ==
Lonkar moved to Mumbai for boosting her acting career. She worked in various TV serials both in Marathi and Hindi languages. After playing the lead role of Damini on the TV show of same name on DD Sahyadri, she came to be known for it. Her Hindi TV serial Kahaani Nahi.... Jeevan Hai was remade as Vasudha in Marathi. She played the lead role in both serials. She was the first woman to kiss over doordarshan. She did a kiss while playing a vamp in an episode of Byomkesh Bakshi.

Along with TV serials, she has also worked in many Marathi and Hindi-language films. Her portrayal of Sudha, a mother who is separated from her son after her divorce, in the Marathi film Bhet (2002) won her awards and appreciation. She played a mother of a young boy in 2007 film Aevdhe Se Aabhaal, where her son is not able to cope with his parents' divorce and his mother's remarriage. She has acted in several Bollywood films, including four films directed by Nagesh Kukunoor viz. Iqbal, Dor, Aashayein and Mod. She has also worked in few Marathi plays.

== Personal life ==
Lonkar is married to Marathi screenplay writer Prashant Dalvi in 1990.

== Filmography ==
=== Films ===
Year	Title	Role	Language
1991	Ek Full Chaar Half		Marathi
1993	Zapatlelya Betavar	Pooja	Marathi
1994	Jamla Ho Jamla	Aruna Tenkshe	Marathi
1997	Gudgudee	Sunita	Hindi
1997	Paij Lagnachi	Vaishali	Marathi
1998	Sarkarnama	Suchitra Patwardhan	Marathi
1999	Bindhaast	Guest for College Gathering	Marathi
2002	Bhet	Sudha	Marathi
2005	Thaiman	Sandhya	Marathi
2005	Iqbal	Saida	Hindi
2006	Dor	Gowri Singh	Hindi
2006	Hee Porgi Kunachi	Mrs. Patki	Marathi
2007	Khanna & Iyer	Mrs. Iyer	Hindi
2007	Aevdhese Aabhal	Shakun	Marathi
2007	Hattrick	Mrs. Chavan	Hindi
2007	Nanhe Jaisalmer	Nanhe's mother	Hindi
2007	Survanta		Marathi
2008	Meerabai Not Out	Neelima M. Achrekar	Hindi
2008	Heroes	Mrs. Naqvi	Hindi
2008	Sakkha Bhau Pakka Vairi	Suman Deshmukh	Marathi
2009	Wanted	Laxmi Verma	Hindi
2009	Vaada Raha	Dr. Kelkar	Hindi
2010	The Waiting Room	Reema	Hindi
2010	Khel Saat Baaracha		Marathi
2010	Lek Ladki	Urmila's Mother	Marathi
2010	Aashayein	Sister Grace	Hindi
2011	Mumbai Cutting		Hindi
2011	Mod	Mrs. Raymond	Hindi
2012	Tukaram	Kankaee	Marathi
2012	Mokala Shwaas	Eknath's Wife	Marathi
2014	Dusari Goshta		Marathi
2015	Tujhya Vina Mar Javaan	Mrs. Shivsagar	Marathi
2016	Family Katta	Sujata	Marathi
2018	Oxygen	Ammi	Gujarati
2020	Makeup	Purvi's Mother	Marathi
2022	Shivpratap Garudjhep	Jijamata	Marathi
2024	Lagna Kallol	Shruti's Mother	Marathi

=== Television ===
Year	Title	Role	Language	TV Channel	Notes
1990	Manuskicha Mala	---	Marathi	DD 10 Marathi	
1990	Dinmaan	---	Marathi	DD 10 Marathi	
1993-1995	Naya Nukkad	Sheetal	Hindi	Doordarshan	
1995-1999	Aahat	Jai's Wife (episode 1.02), Anju (episode 1.18-1.19), Neeta (episode 1.170-1.171)	Hindi	Sony Entertainment Television	
1996	All the Best	Episode 2 & 5	Hindi	DD Metro	
1996	Marshall	Inspector	Hindi	DD Metro	
1993 - 1997	Byomkesh Bakshi	Laxmi Shakuntala	Hindi	DD National	Episodes: Chiriya Ghar (Part 1 & 2); Episode: Aag aur Patanga
1997	Mrs. Madhuri Dixit	Mamta	Hindi	Zee TV	
1997	CID	Sandhya	Hindi	Sony Entertainment Television	
1997 - 2001	Damini	Damini	Marathi	DD Sahyadri	
2001	Bandini	---	Marathi	DD Sahyadri	
2000	Anubhuti	---	Marathi	DD Sahyadri	
2000	Suspense Every Week	Sapna Chauhan	Hindi	Zee TV	
2000	Songadya Bajya	---	Marathi	DD Sahyadri	
2000	Kalat Naklat	---	Marathi	DD Sahyadri	
2001	Daulat	---	Marathi	ETV Marathi	
2000	Arth	---	Marathi	Alpha TV Marathi	
2000	Anna He Poornabrahma	Anchor	Marathi	DD Sahyadri	
2000	Five Days Thriller	Renu	Hindi	DD Metro	
	Duniya		Hindi	Zee TV	
2001	Kahaani Nahi.... Jeevan Hai		Hindi	ETV Hindi/B4U	
2001	Kharach Maza Chukla Ka?	Sangeeta	Marathi	DD Sahyadri	
2001	Sambandh		Hindi	SAB TV	
	Basera		Hindi	Zee TV	
	CID		Hindi	Sony Entertainment Television India	
	Pimpalpaan		Marathi	Alpha TV Marathi	In story Octopus
2003	Fair & Lovely Bharaari	Anchor	Marathi	DD Sahyadri	Chat show
2003	Vasudha	Vasudha	Marathi	ETV Marathi	
2003	Purush	Ambika	Marathi	Zee Marathi	
2011	Sanskaar Laxmi	Kaveri Purohit	Hindi	Zee TV	
2012	Byaah Hamari Bahoo Ka	Yashodha Vaishnav	Hindi	Sony Entertainment Television	Krish's Mother
	Rishtey		Hindi	Zee TV	Episode 7, "Be-Car Ka Chakkar"
2015-2016	Thapki Pyar Ki	Poonam Chaturvedi	Hindi	Colors TV	Thapki's mother
2017	Swarajyarakshak Sambhaji	Jijabai	Marathi	Zee Marathi	
2018–2019	Silsila Badalte Rishton Ka	Sandhya Khanna	Hindi	Colors TV	
2020-2021	Jigarbaaz	Ujjwala Deshmukh	Marathi	Sony Marathi	
2021-2025	Aboli	Rama Shinde	Marathi	Star Pravah	Ankush's Mother

=== Theater ===
Title	Language	Notes
Lagna	Marathi	Directed by Kamlakar Sarang
Char Choughi	Marathi	Directed by Chandrakant Kulkarni
Yelkot	Marathi	Play by Shyam Manohar and directed by Chandrakant Kulkarni
Doctor Tumhi Sudha...	Marathi	Play directed by Chandrakant Kulkarni
Aamhi Sau Kumud Prabhakar Apte	Marathi	Directed by Viren Pradhan
Haravlelya Pattyancha Banglaa	Marathi	Directed by Chandrakant Kulkarni

== Awards ==
- Best actress for Bhet at Maharashtra state award.
- 2003 – Maharashtra Times (MaTa) Sanmaan for Bhet
- 2003 – Star Screen Award for Best Actress in Marathi film for Bhet.
- 2007 – Best Actor at Pune International Film Festival for Aevdhe Se Aabhaal.
- 2008 – Best Actress for Aevdhe Se Aabhaal.
- Vaibhav Purashkar by Print View Publications and Lions club.
