= Te Aath Diwas =

Te Aath Divas
- Directed by: Shyam Swarnlata Dhanorkar
- Written by: Shashank Kewale
- Screenplay by: Shashank Kewale
- Starring: Avinash Masurekar; Renuka Shahane; Tushar Dalvi; Aaroh Velankar; Deepali Muchrikar
- Cinematography: Navneet Misar
- Edited by: Anant Kamat
- Music by: Vikas Bhatavdekar; Pankaj Padghan
- Release date: 30 October 2015
- Country: India
- Language: Marathi

Te Aath Diwas is an Indian Marathi language film directed by Shyam Swarnlata Dhanorkar. The film starring Avinash Masurekar, Renuka Shahane, Tushar Dalvi and Deepali Muchrikar. Music by Vikas Bhatavdekar and Pankaj Padghan. The film was released on 30 October 2015.

== Synopsis ==
A woman leaves her one-year-old daughter to pursue her career in the USA. Things take a turn when she decides to return after eighteen long years to be a part of her daughter's wedding.

== Cast ==
- Renuka Shahane as Vasundhara
- Tushar Dalvi as Sudhakar
- Aaroh Velankar as Shrirang
- Deepali Muchrikar as Praju
- Avinash Masurekar as Aaba
- Sunil Joshi
- Atul Todankar
- Meena Sonavane
- Abhilasha Patil
- Suhasini Paranjpe

== Soundtrack ==
Te Aath Diwas

Soundtrack album by Vikas Bhatavdekar and Pankaj Padghan
- Released: 2015
- Recorded: 2015
- Genre: Feature film soundtrack
- Language: Marathi

Official audio
- Te Aath Diwas – Full Album on YouTube

Track listing
No.	Title	Singer(s)	Length
1.	"Aika Ho Aika"	Vikas Bhatwadekar	3:52
2.	"Aika Ho Aika (Mother)"	Vikas Bhatwadekar	2:10
Total length:			6:02

== Critical reception ==
Te Aath Divas movie received mixed reviews from critics. Ganesh Matkari of Pune Mirror wrote "All said and done, Te Aath Divas is not a bad film, but a film without ambition. In spite of the thought provoking material, it is happy to deliver a moderate result, and a predictable one". Soumitra Pote of Maharashtra Times gave the film 2.5 stars out of 5 and wrote "Overall, the concept is good. If it could have been painted with such fine thought, te aath diwas would have been unforgettable". Raj Chinchankar of Lokmat Says"There is no sloppiness anywhere in it. Of course the credit has to be given to the story, screenplay, dialogue Shashank Kewale and director Shyam Dhanorkar". A Reviewer of Zee Talkies wrote "If you are keen to watch a family entertainer, ‘Te Aath Divas’ is the right choice. Try not keeping very high expectations from this film though".
