= Tushar Dalvi =

Indian film and television actor

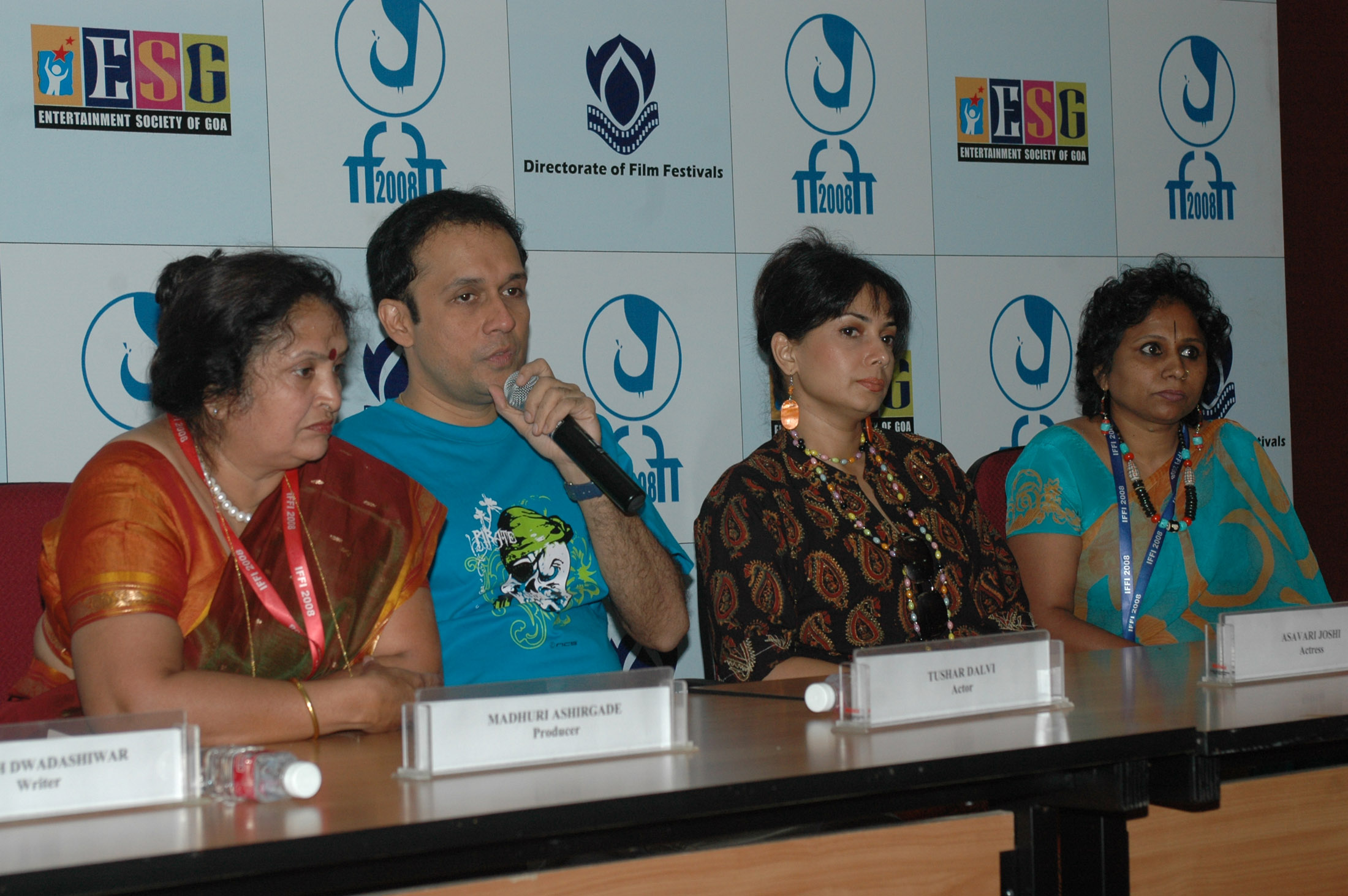
- Dalvi at IFFI 2008
- Occupation: Actor
- Years active: 1992 – present
- Spouse: Malavika Dalvi

Tushar Dalvi is an Indian film and television actor. He has acted in Marathi and Hindi films. His first film role was in Jivalaga. He has won many awards and was nominated on several occasions. He has also done roles in various Hindi television serials, like Kshitij Ye Nahi, Mrs. Madhuri Dixit, Phir Bhi Dil Hai Hindustani, Hari Mirchi Lal Mirchi, and Devon Ke Dev...Mahadev. He has also appeared in episodes of a few Hindi television shows, such as Kanoon, Ssshhhh...Phir Koi Hai and Lakhon Mein Ek.

== Filmography ==
=== Films ===
Year	Film	Role	Language	Notes
1992	Jivalaga		Marathi	
1992	Ek Hota Vidushak	Ravi	Marathi	
2002	Bhet		Marathi	
2002	Mere Yaar Ki Shaadi Hai	Naren	Hindi	
2003	Samay: When Time Strikes	Dr. Ravi	Hindi	
2003	Chimani Pakhar	Mr. Karnik	Marathi	
2003	Not Only Mrs. Raut	Public Prosecutor Aditya Vishnu Dandavate	Marathi	
2004	Devrai	Sudesh (Seena's husband)	Marathi	
2008	Sanai Choughade	Jijaji Shrikant	Marathi	
2008	Kadachit		Marathi	
2013	Investment	Aashish	Marathi	National Film Award for Best Marathi Feature Film
2015	Te Aath Diwas		Marathi	
2016	Madaari	Prashant Goswami	Hindi	
2019	Appa Ani Bappa	Gajanan Shinde	Marathi	
2020	Choked: Paisa Bolta Hai	Bank manager	Hindi	

=== Plays ===
- Ojhyawina Pravasi
- Ha Shekhar Khosla Kon Aahe
- Hamlet

=== Television ===
Year	Serial	Role	Notes
1992	Kshitij Ye Nahi	Shekhar	
1993-1996	Kanoon	Rajkishore / Prem Kumar	
1994–1999	Shrimaan Shrimati	Prem Kumar	1 episode
1995	Aahat	Various characters	4 episodes
1997	Mrs. Madhuri Dixit	Champak Dixit	
1998-1999	Lakeerein		
1999	Zanjeerein		
2000-2001	Shaka Laka Boom Boom	Raj	
2002-2005	Avantika	Dr. Nikhil Rajadhyaksha	
2003-2006	Phir Bhi Dil Hai Hindustani	Om	
2004-2005	Aahat	Ragini's Father	
2005-2011	Woh Rehne Waali Mehlon Ki	Rani's Eldest Brother-In-Law	
2005-2009	Hari Mirchi Lal Mirchi	Rohan Khanna	
2008	Ssshhhh...Phir Koi Hai		
2009-2010	Yeh Pyar Na Hoga Kam	Brijbhushan Mathur	
2010-2014	Swapnanchya Palikadle	Mr.Gaydhani	
2011	Devon Ke Dev...Mahadev	Chandradhar	
2011-2012	Guntata Hriday He	Avinash	
2012-2013	Lakhon Mein Ek		
2012-2013	Mujhse Kuchh Kehti...Yeh Khamoshiyaan	Satyajeet "Satya" Bhosle	
2012-2014	Radha Hi Bawari	Markand Madhukar Drahmadhikari	
2013-2014	Eka Lagnachi Tisri Goshta	Ajit Chaudhari	
2013-2015	Iss Pyaar Ko Kya Naam Doon? Ek Baar Phir	Avdhoot Kirloksar	
2015-2017	Sankatmochan Mahabali Hanumaan	Sage Valmiki	
2017	Vighnaharta Ganesha	Parvatraj Himavan	
2019–2023	Mere Sai – Shraddha Aur Saburi	Sai Baba	
2024–present	Lakshmi Niwas	Shriniwas Dalvi	

=== Web series ===
Year	Web Series	Role	Language	Notes
2024	Commander Karan Saxena	Chief of RAW	Hindi	
