= Mrs. Madhuri Dixit =

- Directed by: Rajan Waghdhare
- Starring: Renuka Shahane; Tushar Dalvi

Original release
- Network: Zee TV
- Release: 1997

Mrs. Madhuri Dixit is a comedy television show broadcast on Zee TV in mid 1997. Renuka Shahne played the title role of Madhuri, while Tushar Dalvi played her husband, Champak Dixit.

== Cast ==
- Renuka Shahane as Madhuri Dixit
- Tushar Dalvi as Champak Dixit (Madhuri's husband)
- Pratiksha Lonkar as Mamta (Madhuri's Friend )
- Jatin Kanakia as Bunty (Mamta's husband)
- Rakesh Paul as Sandy, (Madhuri's brother)
- Shail Chaturvedi as Chairman of Champak's company
- Dinyar Contractor as Bunty's Boss
