= Cup Bashi =

2026 Indian Marathi-language film

- Directed by: Vaibhav Chinchalkar
- Written by: Chetan Saindane
- Produced by: Kalpak Sadanand Joshi; Nilesh Rathi
- Starring: Nirmiti Sawant; Pooja Sawant; Rishi Manohar
- Cinematography: Balu Dahifale
- Edited by: Ashish Mhatre
- Music by: Uttam Singh
- Production companies: Sukalp Chitra; Big Brain Productions
- Distributed by: Sunshine Studio
- Release date: 19 June 2026
- Running time: 150 minutes
- Country: India
- Language: Marathi

Cup Bashi is a 2026 Indian Marathi-language comedy drama film directed by Vaibhav Chinchalkar and written by Chetan Saindane. The film stars Pooja Sawant and Nirmiti Sawant in the lead roles, alongside Rishi Manohar, Anand Kale, Vijay Mishra, Uma Sardeshmukh, Nayana Apte Joshi, Chinmay Shintre and Anant Jog in supporting roles. The film follows an arranged marriage complicated by an unusual condition involving horoscope matching, resulting in humorous and emotional situations between the prospective bride and her future mother-in-law.

The film was theatrically released on 19 June 2026.

== Plot ==
Jitu (Rishi Manohar), a 34-year-old bachelor, is eager to settle down and get married. His mother, Aruna (Nirmiti Sawant), is a firm believer in horoscope matching and, after an extensive search, considers Amruta (Pooja Sawant) to be a suitable match for her son. As their families, led by Shrikant Paradkar (Anand Kale) and Saudamini Paradkar (Uma Sardeshmukh), proceed with the marriage discussions, an unexpected issue concerning their horoscopes puts the proposed union in jeopardy. The situation leads to a series of comic misunderstandings, family discussions and emotional conflicts as Jitu and Amruta navigate the uncertainty surrounding their future together.

== Cast ==
- Nirmiti Sawant as Aruna Karekar
- Pooja Sawant as Amruta
- Rishi Manohar as Jitu Karekar
- Vijay Mishra as Arun Karekar
- Nayana Apte Joshi as Aaji
- Chinmay Shintre as Donga
- Anand Kale as Shrikant Paradkar
- Uma Sardeshmukh as Saudamini Paradkar
- Anand Ingale as Prof. Alaukik
- Anant Jog as Sudesh Bhosle

== Production ==
The project was announced in mid-2025 as a new on-screen pairing for Pooja Sawant and Rishi Manohar, with filming taking place in Mumbai. A teaser was released in May 2026. Kalyan Jewellers served as the jewellery partner for the film.

== Music ==
The film's music was composed by Uttam Singh, while the choreography was handled by Deepali Vichare.

Tracklisting
No.	Title	Lyrics	Singer(s)	Length
1.	"Reshim Reshim"	Guru Thakur	Shaan, Bela Shende	3:06
2.	"Vadhucha Shodh"	Guru Thakur, Vaibhav Chinchalkar	Sumeet Raghavan, Jaanvee Prabhu Arora	2:57
3.	"Disla Bai Disla"	Guru Thakur	Purnima Shreshtha	3:19
4.	"SAREGAMA"	Guru Thakur	Sudesh Bhosale, Purnima Shreshtha	3:07
5.	"Bandha Na Ure"	Guru Thakur	Ravindra Sathe	3:14
Total length:				15:43

== Release and reception ==
Cup Bashi was theatrically released across Maharashtra on 19 June 2026 through Sunshine Studios.

Sanjay Ghavre of Lokmat gave 3 out of 5 stars, calling it an engaging drama. Anub George of The Times of India rated it 2.5 out of 5 stars, describing it as a "preachy yet true to genre ''saas-bahu'' story with a twist" and recommending it as a feel-good film.
