= Meerabai Not Out =

- Film Poster
- Directed by: Chandrakant Kulkarni
- Written by: Soumik Sen
- Produced by: Pritish Nandy
- Starring: Mandira Bedi; Mahesh Manjrekar; Anupam Kher
- Cinematography: Vishnu Rao
- Edited by: Hemal Kothari
- Music by: Sandesh Shandilya
- Production companies: Pritish Nandy Communications; DQ Entertainment International
- Distributed by: Sony Pictures Entertainment (Note: Released under the Columbia Pictures label.)
- Release date: 5 December 2008
- Country: India
- Language: Hindi

Meerabai Not Out is a 2008 Indian Hindi-language film directed by Chandrakant Kulkarni starring Mahesh Manjrekar, Mandira Bedi, Eijaz Khan, and Anupam Kher. The film was released in India on 5 December 2008.

== Plot ==
Meera Achrekar lives a middle-class lifestyle in a Shivaji Park Chawl, along with her widowed mother, brother Manoj, his wife, Neelima, and their son, Mayank. After the passing of their father, Anant, Manoj, who was just 18 at the time, took over the financial reins of this family, while she, herself, got employed as a math teacher with Vishwa-Prem Vidyalaya and heads the 'Meera XI' cricket team in the colony. Her mother and Manoj are on the lookout for a suitable groom, but her obsession with cricket along with the 'bahenji' bespectacled looks turn to her disadvantage. Things start to look up after she dramatically meets with heart specialist Dr. Arjun Awasthi, who lives in a mansion with his widower dentist father. The two families meet and decide to get the couple married. On the day of the formal engagement, however, things spiral out of control when Meera does not show up.

== Cast ==
- Mandira Bedi as Meera A. Achrekar
- Mahesh Manjrekar as Manoj Anant Achrekar
- Anupam Kher as Dr. Awasthi
- Eijaz Khan as Dr. Arjun Awasthi
- Vandana Gupte as Mrs. Achrekar / Aai
- Prateeksha Lonkar as Neelima M. Achrekar
- Anil Kumble as Himself

== Soundtrack ==
The soundtrack was composed by Sandesh Shandilya and Sukhwinder Singh. The lyrics were written by Irfan Siddique, R. N. Dubey and Soumik Sen

Track #	Title	Singer(s)
1	"Hai Rama"	Sukhwinder Singh and Neha Kakkar
2	"Meerabai Not Out"	Neeraj Shridhar and Vijay Prakash
3	"O Dil Sambhal"	Shaan and Sunidhi Chauhan
4	"Chal De Rapat"	Vijay Prakash and Sandesh Shandilya
5	"Kaisi Yeh Shaam"	Kunal Ganjawala
6	"O Dil Sambhal" - Remix	Shaan and Sunidhi Chauhan
7	"Chal De Rapat" - Remix	Vijay Prakash and Sandesh Shandilya

== Release ==
The film was scheduled to release in 2007, coinciding with the 2007 Cricket World Cup but was released an year later on 5 December 2008.

== Reception ==
Taran Adarsh of Bollywood Hungama gave the film 1.5 out of 5, writing "Mandira acts her part well. She impresses more towards the finale. Eijaz is confident and if given an opportunity, can only go further. Mahesh Manjrekar doesn't really get scope, except towards the finale. Anupam Kher is efficient. Pratiksha Lonkar is wasted. The actress enacting the role of Manjrekar and Mandira's mother is perfect. Anil Kumble is passable. On the whole, MEERABAI NOT OUT is a below average fare. At the box-office, this maiden will be run-out in the initial days itself!" Gaurav Malani of The Economic Times gave the film 2 out of 5 calling the film "loosely edited" and camerawork "jaded". Patcy N of Rediff.com gave the film 2 out of 5, writing "Mandira Bedi and Eijaz Khan have done their job well but Anupam Kher and Mahesh Manjrekar are wasted. The film has some good comic scenes, and director Chandrakant Kulkarni does well. But the film is not a comedy, not a love story, nor a family drama, or even a sports film. But it entertains you in bits and parts. And if you're a Mandira fan, watch the film!" Rajeev Masand of CNN-IBN gave the film 1 out of 5, writing "There's a running joke in the film which involves random people telling Meera, our protagonist, that she resembles Mandira Bedi, to which she angrily responds that it's Mandira who resembles her and not the other way around. The punch-line to that self-deprecating joke is delivered by Meera again who says: 'Aur main pure kapde pahenti hoon', meaning: 'Unlike her, I am always fully dressed.' This is possibly the only smart moment in this dumb, regressive film in which Meera's fate is left to the outcome of a cricket match between her brother and her fiancé. Anil Kumble makes a series of short appearances in this film as the object of Meera's crush; it's the kind of embarrassing cameo that the poor chap's not likely to live down in a hurry. A thumbs down and one out of five for director Chandrakant Kulkarni's Meerabai Not Out. This is a film that must be seen to be believed. But wait, that's too high a price to pay!"

Hindustan Times wrote "This is a wannabe Hrishikesh Mukherji movie, a kind of a Guddi 2008ish.. If Jaya Bhaduri was nuts about Dharmendra once, here Mandira Bedi is apricots about Anil Kumble." Shubhra Gupta of The Indian Express wrote "As cricket-crazy Meera, Mandira's not half bad: her 'chashme wali seedhi saadhi' girl is believable. So is TV actor Eijaz, making his film debut, as the second fiddle who knows he will always be trumped by a famous cricketing star. But there's not enough drama in the telling. Anil Kumble makes nano-second appearances. And the only time you see Mandira in her trademark noodle straps is in the item song right towards the end, when the credits are rolling. If you stay that long."
