= Phir Bhi Dil Hai Hindustani (TV series) =

- Genre: Sitcom
- Created by: Nirja Guleri
- Written by: Shrey Guleri
- Directed by: Shrey Guleri
- Starring: Sudhir Pandey; Tushar Dalvi; Jiten Lalwani; Dharmesh Vyas; Upasana Singh; Shital Shah; Bhavana Balsavar; Hardik Gujjar; Pallak Razdan
- Theme music composer: Bittu Merchant
- Opening theme: "Phir Bhi Dil Hai Hindustani" by Udit Narayan
- Country of origin: India
- Original language: Hindi
- No. of seasons: 2
- No. of episodes: 408

Production
- Executive producer: Sahil Guleri
- Producer: Nirja Guleri
- Cinematography: Lokesh Bhalla
- Camera setup: Multi-camera
- Running time: 22 minutes
- Production company: Prime Channel

Original release
- Network: DD National
- Release: 10 October 2003 – April 2006

Phir Bhi Dil Hai Hindustani (Translation: Yet The Heart Is Indian) is an Indian television patriotic sitcom that premiered on DD National on 10 October 2003 and ran for two seasons from 2003 to 2006. Phir Bhi Dil Hai Hindustani was created by Nirja Guleri. The series was written and directed by Shrey Guleri.

Phir Bhi Dil Hai Hindustani chronicles the family of Bharat Bhushan, a perfect patriot. Bharat’s (Translation: India's) family includes his three sons – Om, Jai, and Jagdish, his three daughters-in-law – Ganga, Jamuna, Saraswati and his four grandchildren – Ram, Shyam, Munna and Munni, all of whom live in a house named Bharat Niwas (Translation: India House) and personify the multi – cultural diversity of India.

Phir Bhi Dil Hai Hindustani featured an ensemble cast including Upasana Singh, Bhavana Balsavar, Sudhir Pandey, Tushar Dalvi and Aashish Kaul. Notable stars outside the main cast include Jay Bhanushali, Sumeet Raghavan, Swapnil Joshi, Arjun (Firoz Khan), Naveen Bawa, Vishal Singh, Muskaan Mihani, Lilliput, Krutika Desai and the veteran Kamini Kaushal.

== Premise ==
Bharat Niwas, or India House, is a private household that embodies the rich diversity of Indian culture and society. The family is led by Bharat Bhushan, a man who puts civic duty and national contribution above personal gain.

Bhushan's household spans three generations: his three sons, Om, Jai, and Jagdish, their wives Ganga, Jamuna, and Saraswati, and four grandchildren, Ram, Shyam, Munna, and Munni. The family's varied views on politics and culture mirror the complexities of Indian society. Their disagreements fuel ongoing debates at home, making Bharat Niwas a small-scale reflection of the national conversation on civic issues.

== Cast ==
=== Main ===
- Sudhir Pandey as Bharat
- Tushar Dalvi as Om
- Jiten Lalwani as Jai
- Dharmesh Vyas / Aashish Kaul as Jagdish
- Upasana Singh as Ganga
- Sheetal Shah as Jamuna
- Bhavana Balsavar as Saraswati
- Mickey Dhamejani as Ram
- Mickey Dhamejani as Shyam
- Hardik Gujjar as Munna
- Pallak Razdan as Munni
- Suhasi Goradia as Anjali (Season 2)
- Vishal Kotian as Various Characters (Season 2)

== Series overview ==
Series	Episodes	Originally released	
Series	Episodes	First released	Last released
1	TBA	10 October 2003	TBA
2	TBA	2005	April 2006

=== Season 1 ===
The First Season was named as Phir Bhi Dil Hai Hindustani.

=== Season 2 ===
The Second Season was named as Dil Hai Phir Bhi Hindustani.

== See also ==
- List of Hindi comedy shows
- List of programs broadcast by DD National
