= Bindhaast =

- Title poster
- Directed by: Chandrakant Kulkarni
- Written by: Ajit Dalvi; Prashant Dalvi
- Produced by: Matchindra Chate
- Starring: Reema Lagoo; Sharvari Jamenis; Gautami Kapoor; Mona Ambegaonkar
- Music by: Ashok Patki; Milind Joshi
- Release date: 18 June 1999
- Running time: 155 minutes
- Country: India
- Language: Marathi
- Budget: ₹1.5 crore
- Box office: ₹7.0 crore

Bindhast (transl. Carefree) is a 1999 Indian Marathi-language thriller film directed by Chandrakant Kulkarni and produced by Matchindra Chate. The film is known for its all-women cast. The film was remade in Tamil as Snegithiye and in Malayalam as Raakilipattu. The climax plot twist was also used in Bhagam Bhag and all the adaptations are directed by Priyadarshan.

== Plot ==
Mayuri a.k.a. Mayu (Gautami Kapoor) and Vaijayanta a.k.a. Vaiju (Sharvari Jamenis) are two best friends studying in a girls college. A girl is stabbed by her boyfriend, Rahul, after being harassed and blackmailed by him. ACP Nisha Velankar (Mona Ambegaonkar) arrests Rahul and throws him in jail, where he later commits suicide. Nisha is an ex-alumni of the college and later gets invited as chief guest of its silver jubilee function. Mayuri and Vaiju decide to carve their own destinies after hearing a speech from Nisha several days before the function.

Mayu's Aunt Attu (Reema Lagoo) decides to hand over the family business to her niece and arrange for her marriage. In desperation, Vaiju lies to Attu that Mayu is in love with a pilot named Mahesh Mukadam, whom she met on a trip to Goa. Attu is visibly upset, but decides to support her niece. Later, Mayu starts receiving phone calls from a 'Mahesh Mukadam'. Though she doesn't know him, everything goes fine at first, until Mayu gets a call from "Mahesh" a day before the silver jubilee function. Deciding that someone has caught on to their plan and is deciding to blackmail them, Mayu and Vaiju decide to call this Mahesh to their hostel.

The girls are armed, waiting for Mahesh to turn up, when they hear that Sheela, one of their classmates is also present, since she is ill. Vaiju then goes to put off the gallery bulb. Suddenly, both hear gunshots and rush to find the so-called "Mahesh" dead. Each girl assumes the other to be the killer, until they realize that none of them fired the fatal bullet. Vaiju and Mayu decide to dispose of Mahesh's dead body, but it suddenly goes missing. The silver jubilee function abruptly comes to a halt when Mahesh's body falls on the stage from the A/C pipes.

Things take a strange turn when it appears that Mayu's gun has been fired. The girls are arrested, where they tell the whole story to Nisha, but she derisively brushes it off since Mayu's gun was found to be a perfect match for the bullet. Then, a woman claiming to be Mahesh's mother suddenly arrives in the police station. Realizing that they are getting deeper into this mess, the girls escape from the police station. After contacting their classmates and teachers, Vaiju and Mayu learn that Sheela is also missing since the day of murder and Attu was seen washing her hands continuously in her bungalow, where the girls initially get shelter.

The girls first confront Attu, who reveals that she was aware of their charade from the start. Attu claims that Mahesh was actually Vicky, a young entrepreneur whom she had roped in to mess with the girls. Attu claims that she knew nothing about "Mahesh's mother". Here, Mahesh's "mother" starts stalking the girls. Vaiju and Mayu spy upon a friend of Sheela's and manage to find out her location. The girls confront and overpower Sheela in her hiding place and after gagging her, call Nisha.

After the girls let Sheela talk, she drops a bombshell that the real killer is none other than Nisha. Sheela explains that she heard sounds in the corridor and entered in time to see Nisha pulling out her gun and shooting Mahesh dead in front of her. Then, Nisha saw Sheela and tried to kill her too, forcing her to flee. After realizing the implications, the girls patch up with Sheela and decide to give Nisha a fight. Nisha arrives and corners the three girls, but before she can kill them, Mahesh's mother appears with the police and tells her to drop the weapon. Nisha refuses until the woman produces a girl who uses a wheelchair, whom Nisha had met earlier in a mental asylum.

Later, in front of the panel, "Mahesh's mother" introduces herself as special officer Seema Srivastava. Seema was sent from Delhi to investigate Rahul's death, since forensics indicated foul play. However, by the time she came, Mahesh was killed and Vaiju and Mayu were arrested. Seema knew that the girls were innocent and Nisha was somehow connected to this case too, and decided to use the girls as a lure to catch Nisha. Seema was aided by Nisha's fellow cop to spy on her. She reveals that "Mahesh" was actually a conman who had destroyed the lives of many girls, including Nisha's own sister, the girl in the wheelchair. Nisha saw Mahesh in the hostel and confronted him. However, he started to run away, which angered her. After Sheela disappeared, Nisha removed Mahesh's body. While searching Mayu's gun, Nisha realized that her gun was the same make and had Mayu framed.

After the girls are exonerated, a huge comeback party is arranged for Mayu, Vaiju, and Sheela. A huge bouquet from "Mahesh Mukadam" is delivered to Mayu. Seeing the others' expressions, she realizes that none of them sent it. Suddenly, Attu leaps out from behind the bouquet as a surprise. After the initial shock subsides, everybody laughs.

== Cast ==
- Reema Lagoo as Asawari Patwardhan (Attu). She has brought up Mayu single-handedly after her parents died and now wants to hand over the business to her niece.
- Sharvari Jamenis as Vaijayanti Patil (Vaiju). Mayu's best friend and the daughter of a school teacher.
- Gautami Kapoor as Mayuri (Mayu)
- Mona Ambegaonkar as ACP Nisha Velankar. Nisha hates crimes against women and is an ex-alumni of the college Mayu and Vaiju are attending.
- Meenal Pendse as Sheela. Sheela is the nemesis of both Mayu and Vaiju.
- Reshma Polekar as Nisha's fellow cop.
- Nirmiti Sawant as Teacher
- Seema Biswas as CBI Officer Seema Srivastava.
- Neha Bam as Joshi Bai
- Deepa Parab Mayu's friend
- Prateeksha Lonkar as Guest for college gathering
- Sonali Naik as Asawari Naik
- Deepa Shriram as Principal
- Anita Kulkarni

== Awards ==
=== Maharashtra State Film Awards ===
- Best Lyricist – Vasu Vaidya
- Best Screenplay – Ajit Dalvi
- Best Dialogues – Prashant Dalvi
- Best actress in a comic role - neena sawant.

=== Screen Awards ===
- Best Film – Matchindra Chate
- Best Director – Chandrakant Kulkarni
- Best Actress – Sharvari Jamenis
