= Lek Majhi Durga =

2022 Indian Marathi-language TV series

- Genre: Drama; Soap opera
- Created by: Colors Marathi
- Written by: Abhijeet Guru
- Starring: See below
- Country of origin: India
- Original language: Marathi
- No. of episodes: 186

Production
- Camera setup: Multi-camera
- Running time: 22 minutes

Original release
- Network: Colors Marathi
- Release: 14 February – 16 September 2022

Related
- Shakti - Astitva Ke Ehsaas Ki

Lek Majhi Durga (transl. My daughter is goddess durga) is an Indian Marathi language television series which is written by Abhijeet Guru. The show premiered from 14 February 2022 and ended on 16 September 2022 aired on Colors Marathi. It stars Swapnil Pawar and Rashmi Anpat in lead roles. It is an official remake of Hindi TV series Shakti - Astitva Ke Ehsaas Ki.

== Plot ==
Deprived of an education, companions and toys, Durga can't understand the indifference her father and grandmother show towards her and finds solace only in her mother's arms. Meanwhile, her sister Shivani gets everything she wants, except for the one thing she yearns for, her mother's love.

== Cast ==
=== Main ===
- Varada Patil / Rashmi Anpat as Durga
- Swapnil Pawar as Jaysingh

=== Recurring ===
- Payal Memane
- Hemangi Kavi
- Sushil Inamdar
- Sai Ranade
- Anand Kale / Rajesh Deshpande
- Mrunal Deshpande
- Sanket Korlekar
- Sohan Nandurdikar
- Sandesh Jadhav

== Adaptations ==
Language	Title	Original Release	Network(s)	Last aired	Notes
Hindi	Shakti - Astitva Ke Ehsaas Ki शक्ति - अस्तित्व के एहसास की	30 May 2016	Colors TV	1 October 2021	Original
Marathi	Lek Majhi Durga लेक माझी दुर्गा	14 February 2022	Colors Marathi	24 September 2022	Remake
