= Jadubai Jorat =

Marathi-language comedy series

- Genre: Comedy; Drama
- Starring: See below
- Country of origin: India
- Original language: Marathi
- No. of episodes: 216

Production
- Producer: Tejendra Neswankar
- Production locations: Mumbai, Maharashtra, India
- Camera setup: Multi-camera
- Running time: 22 minutes
- Production company: Trrump Carrd Production

Original release
- Network: Zee Marathi
- Release: 24 July 2017 – 31 March 2018

Jadubai Jorat (transl. Fat Lady in vigor) is an Indian Marathi language comedy series which aired on Zee Marathi. It starred Nirmiti Sawant and Kishori Shahane in lead roles. It premiered from 24 July 2017 and produced by Tejendra Neswankar under the banner of Trrump Carrd Production.

== Synopsis ==
Jadubai Jorat tells the audience that beauty is not what appears on the exterior but it is what is within. The story is about Jui Kanvinde Samant, a simple working woman from Maharashtra, who has sacrificed all her interests to take care of her family as a homemaker. As a result, she has neglected her personal appearances as well and has developed much obesity. One day, however, Jui meets her childhood friend, Mallika Raje Pradhan, an upper-class independent woman, who challenges her to lose weight and become fit just like her. The question is whether Jui will accept Mallika's challenge and make the impossible possible as her love for food wins over her determination to lose weight every time which forms the central part of the story.

== Cast ==
=== Main ===
- Nirmiti Sawant as Jui Anna Kanvinde / Jui Suryakant Samant (Jadubai): Surya's wife; Sayali and Yash's mother; Anna's daughter; Appa and Uma's daughter-in-law; Nanda's sister-in-law; Swara's aunt; Mallika's childhood best friend
- Kishori Shahane as Mallika Shantanu Raje / Mallika Shrikar Pradhan (Mallu): Shri's wife; Rugved's mother; Maharaj's employer; Surya's ex-girlfriend; Jui's childhood best friend

=== Recurring ===
- Siddharth Khirid as Rugved Shrikar Pradhan (Ru): Sayali's boyfriend; Shri and Mallika's son; Maharaj's employer; Gargi's ex-suitor
- Sanchita Kulkarni as Sayali Suryakant Samant (Saa / Sau): Rugved's girlfriend; Surya and Jui's daughter; Yash and Swara's older sister; Anna, Appa and Uma's older granddaughter; Nanda and Sameer's niece; Viraj's best friend
- Anand Kale as Suryakant Appa Samant (Surya / Suru): Jui's husband; Sayali and Yash's father; Appa and Uma's son; Anna's son-in-law; Nanda's older brother; Sameer's brother-in-law; Swara's uncle; Mallika's ex-boyfriend
- Vighnesh Joshi as Shrikar Shankar Pradhan (Shri): Mallika's husband; Rugved's father; Maharaj's employer
- Jayant Savarkar as Anna Kanvinde (Aajju): Jui's father; Surya's father-in-law; Sayali and Yash's maternal grandfather; Appa and Uma's co-father-in-law
- Pradeep Joshi as Appa Samant (Aajju): Uma's husband; Surya and Nanda's father; Jui and Sameer's father-in-law; Sayali and Yash's paternal and Swara's maternal grandfather; Anna and Ragini's co-father-in-law
- Sanjeevani Samel as Uma Appa Samant (Aai / Aaji): Appa's husband; Surya and Nanda's mother; Jui and Sameer's mother-in-law; Sayali and Yash's paternal and Swara's maternal grandmother; Anna and Ragini's co-mother-in-law
- Pradnya Edake Jawale as Nanda Appa Samant / Nanda Sameer Naik (Taai / Aattu): Sameer's separated wife; Swara's mother; Appa and Uma's daughter; Ragini's separated daughter-in-law; Surya's younger sister; Jui's sister-in-law; Sayali and Yash's aunt
- Parth Ghatge as Yash Suryakant Samant (Yashu): Surya and Jui's son; Sayali's younger and Swara's older brother; Anna, Appa and Uma's grandson; Nanda and Sameer's nephew
- Amey Borkar as Viraj Vasant Barve (Viru): Mr. Barve's son; Rugved and Sayali's best friend
- Rajesh Chitnis as Vasant Raghuraman Barve (Bhauji): Viraj's father; Surya and Shri's best friend
- Yogita Chavan as Gargi Ranjit Singh Nimbalkar: Aabasaheb and Richa's daughter; Rugved's ex-suitress
- Mugdha Godbole Ranade as Richa Ranjit Singh Nimbalkar: Aabasaheb's wife; Gargi's mother; Mallika's best friend
- Ragini Samant as Ragini Naik (Ragi Kaku): Sameer's mother; Nanda's mother-in-law; Swara's paternal grandmother

== Reception ==
=== Special episode (1 hour) ===
- 17 September 2017

=== Airing history ===
| No. | Airing Date | Days | Time (IST) |
|---|---|---|---|
| 1 | 24 July – 25 November 2017 | Mon-Sat | 1 pm |
| 2 | 27 November 2017 – 31 March 2018 | Mon-Sat | 6 pm |
