= Tula Pahata =

2026 Indian Marathi-language film

- Directed by: Mayura Pradhan
- Written by: Mayura Pradhan
- Produced by: Mayura Pradhan
- Starring: Satish Pulekar; Ila Bhate; Nachiket Lele; Manasi Patil; Nishigandha Wad; Anand Kale
- Cinematography: Pushkar Zoting
- Edited by: Apurva Motiwale
- Music by: Rohan-Rohan
- Production company: Brave Wheel Productions
- Distributed by: Cinépolis India
- Release date: 10 July 2026
- Running time: 140 minutes
- Country: India
- Language: Marathi

Tula Pahata (transl. When I See You) is a 2026 Indian Marathi-language romantic drama film written, directed and produced by Mayura Pradhan in her feature debut, under the Brave Wheel Productions banner. The film stars Satish Pulekar, Ila Bhate, Nachiket Lele, Manasi Patil, with Nishigandha Wad, Anand Kale, Deepali Vichare in supporting roles. Structured around two love stories set in 1971 and 2026, the film spans three generations of a joint family and examines love, expectation and changing attitudes to marriage and companionship. It was released worldwide on 10 July 2026.

== Premise ==
A young man, deeply in love, abruptly disappears from the life of the woman he is involved with. Years later he returns as a retired army officer, and his reappearance sets off an emotional upheaval in her life. Running parallel to this earlier romance is a contemporary story set in 2026, in which a younger couple in the same extended family navigate their own relationship against the expectations of a joint household. The film moves between the two periods, using the 1970s setting, evoked through costume, atmosphere and music of the era, as a counterpoint to present-day attitudes towards love and marriage.

== Cast ==
- Satish Pulekar as Harishchandra Deshmukh, Tanvi’s grandfather
  - Swapnil Parjane as young Harishchandra
- Ila Bhate as Arundhati Deshpande, Sagar’s grandmother
  - Pallavi Ajay as young Arundhati
- Nachiket Lele as Sagar Vaidya
- Manasi Patil as Tanvi Deshmukh
- Nishigandha Wad as Sagar’s mother
- Anand Kale as Sagar’s father
- Deepali Vichare as Tanvi’s mother
- Akash Shinde as Raghav

== Production ==
Tula Pahata marked Mayura Pradhan's feature-film debut as producer, writer and director. The film featured actors from different generations, with veteran actors Pulekar and Bhate sharing the screen as a pair for the first time in their careers. The film also marked Nishigandha Wad's return to Marathi cinema after an extended absence; she said she was drawn to the contemporary script and its treatment of intergenerational tensions, while Pradhan's narration of the story and her role persuaded her to join the project. For Nachiket Lele, known for his appearances on televised singing reality shows, the film marked his debut as both an actor and playback singer.

== Music ==
The score and songs were composed by the duo Rohan-Rohan.

Tracklisting
| No. | Title | Lyrics | Singer(s) | Length |
|---|---|---|---|---|
| 1. | "Tula Pahta Title Track - Female Version" | Mandar Cholkar | Aarya Ambekar | 2:30 |
| 2. | "Tula Pahta Title Track - Male Version" | Mandar Cholkar | Rahul Deshpande | 2:24 |
| 3. | "Lagna-Bigna" | Rohan Gokhale | Sunidhi Chauhan, Rohan Pradhan | 2:58 |
| 4. | "Maun Tu Maun Mee" | Mandar Cholkar | Sonu Nigam | 3:45 |
| 5. | "Sparsh Nave" | Dinesh Ghogle | Aarya Ambekar, Javed Ali | 3:04 |
| 6. | "Sang Na" | Rohan Gokhale | Rohan-Rohan | 4:13 |
| 7. | "Dur-Dur" | Rohan Gokhale | Nachiket Lele, Sai Godbole | 2:45 |
| Total length: | | | | 21:39 |

== Release ==
The film's first-look poster was released on social media in April 2026, followed by a teaser in May. The theatrical trailer was launched at an event in Mumbai in July 2026 by actor Mushtaq Khan.

Tula Pahata was released worldwide on 10 July 2026.

== Reception ==
Anub George of The Times of India rated the film 3 out of 5, calling it "a visual treat with a welcome twist on the 'romance and hurdles' trope", praising the grandparents' storyline, cinematography and Rohan–Rohan's music while finding the story itself middling. Sanjay Ghavre of Lokmat rated it 3.5 out of 5, describing it as an album of memories spanning old and new relationships, praising Bhate's performance and Pulekar's understated romantic role while finding Hari and Aru's reunion lacking impact.
