= Snegithiye =

- Poster of Tamil version
- Directed by: Priyadarshan
- Written by: Maharajan (Tamil dialogues)
- Screenplay by: Priyadarshan
- Story by: Chandrakant Kulkarni
- Produced by: Mukesh R. Mehta
- Starring: Jyothika; Sharbani Mukherjee; Tabu; Ishitta Arun; Manasi Scott
- Cinematography: Jeeva
- Edited by: N. Gopalakrishnan
- Music by: Songs: Vidyasagar; Background Score: Sangeetharajan
- Production company: Surya Cine Arts
- Release dates: 24 November 2000 (Tamil); 18 April 2007 (Malayalam)
- Running time: 154 minutes
- Country: India
- Languages: Tamil; Malayalam

Rakkilipattu DVD poster

Snegithiye (transl. Oh female friend!) is a 2000 Indian Tamil-language mystery thriller film directed by Priyadarshan. The film notably features only female characters.The main leads are Jyothika and Sharbani Mukherjee as best friends with Tabu and Ishitta Arun playing significant supporting roles. This is the latest Tamil film of Tabu till date. Music was composed by Vidyasagar. The film, released in 2000, proved to be an average grosser at the box office but bagged positive reviews from critics.

Originally planned to be made as a multilingual, in Tamil, Malayalam and Hindi, the film was released first in Tamil, while the Malayalam version, Raakilipattu (transl. Rock music), as well as the Hindi dubbed version of the Malayalam version, Friendship were released seven years later. The film's story is loosely based on the 1999 Marathi film Bindhaast.

== Plot ==
Best friends Vani "Vasu" Subramaniam (Josephine in Malayalam) and Radhika Menon are carefree pranksters at a prestigious ladies' college in Chennai. They stay up late, break rules and wreak havoc at their hostel, much to their lecturers' annoyance. They also form a rivalry against Geetha, the college queen bee. Malathi, Radhika's aunt, wants her niece to complete her studies, so that she can take over her late parents' multi-million business. In order to straighten Radhika out, Malathi arranges for her to get married.

At this point, Vasu and Radhika are introduced to Gayathri, a fiercely independent and strong police officer and an alumnus of their college. During an event at the college, Gayathri explains how women in the country lose their independence and livelihood after getting married. Convinced that they should avoid marriage as long as possible, Vani and Radhika pretend that Radhika has a boyfriend from overseas, named Ramesh, in order to avoid Malathi from arranging anymore suitors. However, this fantasy takes a whole new turn when an actual person named Ramesh calls and sends Radhika letters, claiming to be her boyfriend. To end this nuisance, Vasu and Radhika invite Ramesh to their hostel during the college dance program and plan to trick him into blurt out the truth. Vasu instructs Radhika to bring her aunt's guns for their safety.

However, a mysterious shooter kills Ramesh before the girls can confront him. Fearing that suspicion would fall on them, they decide to dispose of the body by hiding it in the air ventilator. Unexpectedly, the body slides down the vent and lands on the auditorium stage, in the middle of a performance. Gayathri, who is the guest of honour at the event, takes charge of the case. She finds Radhika's necklace on the body and the two girls are brought in for questioning. At the police station, an old woman shows up claiming that Ramesh is her son and has gone missing. Realising that the noose is tightening and that the story of their innocence will not stand, Vasu and Radhika escape police custody and hide in an abandoned mansion on the outskirts of the city.

Now the prime suspects of Ramesh's murder, they decide to find the real killer before Gayathri catches up to them. Vasu suspects Malathi of framing them in order to inherit Radhika's wealth. When they finally meet her, Malathi explains that she had known all along that the girls had been fooling her. The young man who was pretending to be Ramesh, was actually a family friend, named Vikram, whom Malathi had been planning to marry Radhika off to.

Through their college friends, the girls discover that Geetha had gone missing on that fateful night. After much difficulty, the girls find Geetha hiding in a border town. However, Geetha reveals that she too is on the run from Gayathri; on the night of the murder, she had returned to the hostel to take some medications and had inadvertently witnessed Gayathri kill Vikram/Ramesh. Geetha had fled from the scene, fearing Gayathri would use her influence to cover up the crime. Unfortunately, Gayathri manages to catch up on the trio. However, the woman who had pretended to be Ramesh's mother arrives on the scene. She turns out to be a CBI officer, who had been investigating Gayathri and knows that the girls are not responsible for Vikram's murder.

Gayathri ends up having a mental breakdown. The CBI officer reveals that Gayathri had murdered Vikram to avenge her sister's paralysis. Vikram had raped Gayathri's sister in the past after Gayathri found out he was a womaniser and stopped her sister from dating him. To escape justice, she had no choice but to frame Vasu and Radhika as the murderers. The film concludes with Gayathri institutionalised at a mental asylum where the three girls, Vani, Radhika and Geetha, now close friends, pay her a visit.

== Cast ==
- Jyothika as Vani Subramaniyam (Vasu) (Tamil) / Josephine (Josootty "Jo") (Malayalam) / Bharathi (Hindi)
- Sharbani Mukherjee as Radhika Menon
- Tabu as ACP Gayathri Varma
- Ishitta Arun as Geetha Damodaran
- Shweta Menon as Jayasri, police officer
- Lakshmi as Malathi Menon (Radhika's aunt)
- Manorama as Bhanumathi, Vani's mother (Tamil version)
- K. P. A. C. Lalitha as Eliama Pothen (Josootty's mother) (Malayalam version)
- Bharati Achrekar as Mrs. Sumthankar (Bharathi's mother) (Hindi version)
- Manjula Vijayakumar as college professor
- Major Ravi as Ramesh/Vikram
- Mita Vasisht as Prema Narayanan, the under cover cop
- Sukumari as the hostel warden and a history professor
- Shanthi Williams as the college principal
- Manasi Scott as Nimmi, Vani's friend
- Suchithra as Advocate Sowmya/Sowmini
- Manju Pillai as a police constable and Geetha's guardian
- Poornima Parameswaran as Kutti Paru
- Neelam Singh as Neelam, Geetha's friend
- Jomol as Savitri, Gayathri's sister (cameo appearance)
- Deepti Bhatnagar in a Special Appearance
- Philomina as Vikram's neighbour (cameo)
- Shari as Arundathi (cameo appearance)
- Vadivukkarasi as Ramesh's neighbour (cameo appearance)

== Production ==
The original story idea for the film was taken from Marathi writer Chandrakant Kulkarni, who had made the successful Marathi film, Bindhaast, based on the story last year. Priyadarshan heard about the film and asked producer Mukesh Mehta to see it and decide whether he would like to produce the movie and thus Mehta went to Bombay, saw the film and liked it. However the producer reiterated that they have taken only the main thread from the Marathi story with the rest of the film, its sub-plots and the treatment are completely different from the original. Initially, it was planned as a Malayalam film with a cast familiar to the Kerala audience. But as Priyadarshan's excitement over the project grew, the canvas got wider and the producer decided to look for a bigger audience. Thus Jyothika, Sharbani Mukherjee and Ishita Arun, daughter of Ila Arun, stepped in to give it a more national flavour. Seasoned actresses like Sukumari, Manorama, Lakshmi, KPAC Lalitha, Mita Vasisht, Tabu, and Dipti Bhatnagar also joined the all-female team. Cinematographer Jeeva and art director Sabu Cyril also joined the team and they shot 90 per cent of the film in a college in Mysore and the rest in Chennai, also featuring live coverage of the Dasara (Dussera) festival of Mysuru. The film was subsequently made simultaneously in Tamil and Malayalam with a title of Raakilipattu, while a Hindi version was also planned in 2000. The title of the Tamil version of the film was taken from a song from the 2000 film Alai Payuthey.

Jyothika prioritised her work in the project and thus delayed her schedules for the films Uyirile Kalanthathu in order to ensure the film was released as early as possible. The songs of the film were released at Devi Theatre with Kamal Haasan appearing as the chief guest.

== Soundtrack ==
While S. P. Venkatesh composed the score, the songs were composed by Vidyasagar, except "Kannukulle" which was composed by Raghunath Seth as mentioned in the original audio cassette. The songs were well received by the audience and critics. In an audio review, Venky of Chennai Online wote "On the whole, it is a very good effort by Vidyasagar".

Track listing

Song title	Singers	Lyrics
"Othayadi Padhayile"	Manasi, Ila Arun	Vairamuthu
"Radhai Manathil"	K. S. Chithra, Sujatha, Sangeetha Sajith	Vairamuthu
"Doora Desam"	Venugopal, Sujatha	Kadhal Mathi
"Kalluri Malare"	K. S. Chithra, Sujatha, Sangeetha Sajith	Vairamuthu
"Kannukulle"	Srinivas	Kadhal Mathi
"Devadhai Vamsam"	K. S. Chithra, Sujatha	Pa. Vijay

For Raakilipattu:

Song title	Singers
"Dhum Dhum Dhooreyetho"	K. S. Chithra, Sujatha, Sangeetha Sajith
"Omana Thinkal"	K. S. Chithra, Sujatha, Sangeetha Sajith
"Saarike Ninne"	K. S. Chitra, Sujatha Mohan
"Mazha Paithu Thorna"	M. G. Sreekumar, Sujatha Mohan
"Palapoovin Lolakunde"	M. G. Sreekumar, Sujatha Mohan
"Rappadippakshi Idhile"	M. G. Sreekumar, Sujatha Mohan
"Anthinila Manathu"	M. G. Sreekumar, Ila Arun
Kanniludakkiya Kanthari	M. G Sreekumar

== Release ==
Release for the film was postponed several times with the makers hoping to get a simultaneous release for all versions. The team also noted the Kidnapping of Dr. Rajkumar by bandit Veerappan as reason for the delay. Snegithiye went on to inspire other film makers to produce all women ventures, with director Gnanasekharan announcing that his project, Aishwarya, starring Uma, Monal and Abhinayashree would be a "small-scale Snegithiye".

The film was simultaneously taken in Tamil, Malayalam and Hindi, but only Tamil version released in 2000. The Malayalam and Hindi versions released on 18 April 2007. Raakilipattu was released in Kerala, only in 2007. The Malayalam version's Hindi dubbed version Friendship was also released in 2007.

== Critical reception ==
Malathi Rangarajan of The Hindu wrote, "In a medium where women (read heroines) are thought of as a dispensable commodity, here is a murder mystery, conceived with a cast comprising only women, and made quite interestingly too". Malini Mannath of Chennai Online wrote, "The first part moves with breezy fun" but concluded that "the script goes haywire in the second half, the shoddy treatment not helping matters either. The scenes here all seem to belong to some c-grade Hollywood thriller. Leading one to suspect whether Priyadarshan really directed this film!"
