= Shyamchi Mummy =

2008 two-act Marathi play by Ashok Patole

- Original language: Marathi
- Characters: Yashoda Borkar; Anand Borkar; Shyam Borkar; Gundappa Hegde
- Genre: Comedy

Premiere
- Date: 12 January 2008
- Place: India

Shyamchi Mummy is a 2008 two-act Marathi play by Ashok Patole and directed by Purshottam Berde. The cast includes Nirmiti Sawant, Purnima Ahire, Anant Chauhan, Purshottam Berde, Manohar Gaikwad.

This is a comedy play about the current education system taking a toll on students. The play is about various efforts taken by a mother to see that her son gets a good score on an exam. It is occasionally shown on Zee Talkies during the Tisri Ghanta programme.

== Synopsis ==
Yashoda Borkar (Nirmiti Sawant) works at a bank and is married to a singer/music director Anand Borkar (Satish Tare), who in unsuccessful in both of his careers. They have a teenage son in 11th grade and Yashoda insists that he focus on his education as she wants him to become a doctor.

Their neighbors' son always gets better grades than Shyam even though he participates in sports.

== Cast ==
- Nirmiti Sawant
- Purnima Ahire
- Anant Chauhan
- Purshottam Berde
- Manohar Gaikwad
- Bhushan Kadu

== Crew ==
- Director - Purshottam Berde
