= Akalpith =

- Theatrical poster
- Directed by: Prasad Acharekar
- Written by: Prasad Acharekar
- Screenplay by: Snehal Pendurkar
- Produced by: NoughtCreations (Prasad Ugle and Harshal Ushir)
- Starring: Mohan Agashe; Nirmiti Sawant; Renuka Shahane
- Cinematography: Amit Kodoth; Neeshank Mathure
- Music by: Parikrama
- Release date: 28 February 2014
- Country: India
- Language: Marathi

Akalpith is a Marathi movie to be released on 28 February 2014. The genre of movie is a 'psychological thriller' and is written and directed by Mr. Prasad Acharekar. The movie stars Renuka Shahane, Mohan Agashe and Nirmiti Sawant. The theme song of movie is written by Guru Thakur and is composed by Sonam Sherpa, Nitin Malik and Subir Malik of Parikrama Band.

== Plot ==
A man is accused of three murders but during the interrogations he says that he doesn't remember the day's events and hence is considered to be insane. So, he is to be transferred to Bhopal psychological research department. Just 14 hours before he is to be transported to Bhopal, he says that he has started to remember the events of that day. An urgent special midnight jury is arranged to record the statement and he is taken there. He is recording his statement and what he remembers, but the problem starts when he remembers that he was present on the place of murders but didn't kill the people. Now he only has 4 hours to prove to the jury that he is innocent. What happens next is the movie.

== Cast ==
- Renuka Shahane - Dr. Mugdha
- Mohan Aagashe - Justice Gore
- Nirrmite Saawaant - Mrs. Sarnjamhe
- Abheney Saawaant - Milind Deshmukh
- Sumaydh Gaikwad - Raj
- Rutul Patil - Shweta
- Ashutosh Patki — Vishal
- Atul Todankar- Mr. Shinde
- Sandesh Jadhav - Killer Chotu
- Sachin Shinde - Milind's Lawyer
- Saurabh Oak - Mr. Kamath
- Shashikant Patade - Pandu

== Critical reception ==
Akalpith movie received mixed reviews from critics. A Reviewer of The Times of India wrote "The film has its thrills and twists but does not build the kind of suspense that one would expect from a psychological thriller. The music does not provide the required tension but it is a one time watch". A Reviewer of Loksatta wrote "When watching the end of the movie, the writer definitely feels lost somewhere. As the ending of the film is not effective, the audience is likely to walk out of the theater in a confused state..". A Reviewer of Zee Talkies says "But, if you are going to watch it from critical point of view, certainly there are few errors to notice. Especially, the climax of the film is not very convincing".
