= Asava Sundar Swapnancha Bangla =

Marathi-language television drama series

- Genre: Family drama Soap opera
- Written by: Sameer Joshi
- Story by: Rohini Ninawe
- Directed by: Chandar Behel
- Starring: See below
- Country of origin: India
- Original language: Marathi
- No. of episodes: 1000

Production
- Producers: Kalyan Guha; Rupali Guha
- Production locations: Mumbai, Maharashtra
- Camera setup: Multi-camera
- Running time: 22 minutes
- Production company: Film Farm India

Original release
- Network: Colors Marathi
- Release: 7 January 2013 – 19 March 2016

Related
- Uttaran

Asava Sundar Swapnancha Bangla (transl. Have a beautiful dream bungalow) is an Indian Marathi language television drama series which aired on Colors Marathi. The show starred Rashmi Anpat, Juhi Patwardhan and Suhrud Wardekar in lead roles. The series premiered from 7 January 2013 and ended on 19 March 2016 completing 1000 episodes. The show is an official remake of Colors TV's Hindi series Uttaran.

== Summary ==
It explores the complexity of the relationship between the rich and the poor. It is a story of jealousy and revenge. The story revolves around a poor and fatherless girl who always receives cast-offs from a rich girl.

== Cast ==
=== Main ===
- Rashmi Anpat as Ishwari
  - Mrunmayee Supal as child Ishwari
- Suhrud Wardekar as Aarav
- Juhi Patwardhan as Ankita
  - Sakshi Tisgaonkar as child Ankita

=== Recurring ===
- Pushkar Jog
- Ravindra Mahajani
- Ajinkya Deo
- Shailesh Datar
- Anand Kale
- Shilpa Navalkar
- Mitali Jagtap-Varadkar
- Sushant Shelar
- Sanyogita Bhave
- Prasad Limaye
- Ajinkya Nanaware
- Prasad Limaye
- Shweta Mehendale
- Surabhi Bhave-Damle
- Vanashree Joshi-Pande
- Sangram Samel
- Rasika Vengurlekar
- Shantanu Moghe
- Ambarish Deshpande
- Dipti Bhagwat
- Madhavi Gogate
