= Chandrakant Kulkarni =

Indian film director, script writer and actor (born 1963)

- Born: 1963 (age 61–62); Hamdapur, Maharashtra, India
- Occupation: Film director
- Spouse: Sonali Kulkarni (divorced)

Chandrakant Kulkarni (born 1963) is an Indian director, script writer and actor associated with Marathi theatre and film. He is known for his works of directing the plays Wada Chirebandi, Dhyanimani, Gandhi Virudh Gandhi and most recently the remake of Hamidabaichi Kothi. He has also directed the acclaimed films Bindhaast (1999) and Tukaram (2012).

At the 61st National Film Awards, his film Aajcha Divas Majha won the award for Best Feature Film in Marathi.

== Career ==
=== Theatre ===
Chandrakant Kulkarni came to Mumbai from Aurangabad, Maharashtra, aspiring to work in the entertainment industry. After working on various plays Kulkarni directed the eight-hour-long trilogy play Wada Chirebandi written by Mahesh Elkunchwar in 1994. The play was written in three parts as Wada Chirebandi, Magna Talyakathi and Yuganta. Kulkarni directed the play under the production banner of "Awishkar" which was founded by director Arvind Deshpande and his actress wife Sulabha Deshpande. The first part of the play was earlier directed by Vijaya Mehta in 1985. Kulkarni directed the whole trilogy after Elkunchwar completed it in 1994. In 2006, director Chetan Datar edited and staged it in a single play. Kulkarni says that he has been attached to the play for 26+ years and directing it was one of his dreams.

In 1995, Kulkarni directed the Marathi play Dhyanimani written by Prashant Dalvi. The play was later also adapted in Hindi after fifteen years as Bas Itna Sa Khwab Hai...! with lead roles played by Shefali Shah and Kiran Karmarkar and Vipul Shah as the presenter. Kulkarni has also directed this Hindi version.

In 1995–96 he directed the play Gandhi Virudh Gandhi which was written by Ajit Dalvi. The play was originally based on another Gujarati play of same theme by Dinkar Joshi. The play brought forth the conflicts between Mahatma Gandhi and his eldest son Harilal Gandhi and staged veteran actress Bhakti Barve and actor Atul Kulkarni as Mahatma. Seeing the success of the play, Kulkarni also directed the Hindi version of it. Barve's role was played by actress Seema Biswas in the Hindi version. The play was later adapted into an English version Mahatma verses Gandhi directed by Feroz Abbas Khan. Later on, Khan adapted the line for his 2007 Hindi film Gandhi, My Father.

Kulkarni presented monologues in the 2009 play Maunaraag which were based on essays written by Elkunchwar. In 2011, he directed the play Adhi Basu Mag Bolu that discussed the trend of marriages breaking due to miscommunication. Written by Vidyasagar Adhyapak and starring Sanjay Narvekar in lead role, the play was produced by Lata Narvekar's Chintamani Productions. Same year he also directed the remake of the play Hamidabaichi Kothi under the banner Herbarium run by actor Sunil Barve. The play was directed by Vijaya Mehta thirty-three years ago.

Kulkarni has also directed various popular plays like Shantata! Court Chalu Aahe, Varyavarchi Varaat and Batatyachi Chal for their CD/DVD versions. He has about 65 plays to his credit.

=== Films ===
Kulkarni stepped into films as an actor. His earlier roles include the one for the 1995 Marathi film Bangarwadi, directed by Amol Palekar based on the 1954 novel of the same name written by Vyankatesh Madgulkar. His first directorial venture was the much acclaimed 1999 film Bindhaast. Known for the all-women cast, the film was a thriller suspense and bagged numerous Maharashtra State Film Awards. Kulkarni was presented with the Second Best Director Award and the film won the Third Best Film Award. With Bindhaast, Kulkarni broke the Marathi film industry's slapstick-comedy trend of the 1980s and 90s. The film was adapted by Priyadarshan in 2000 as Snegithiye in Tamil language.

Kulkarni's next film Bhet released in 2002. The film was a yearning story of a mother (played by Prateeksha Lonkar) wanting to meet her son (played by Apoorva Korgave) who lives with her ex-husband (played by Atul Kulkarni) after the couple's divorce. The film brought various awards for Prateeksha Lonkar and Atul Kulkarni.

In 2005, Kulkarni directed the comedy Kaydyacha Bola, a satire on the judicial system with lead role played by Makarand Anaspure. His 2007 film Kadachit was a drama that marked the come back of actress Ashwini Bhave who also produced the film. With the 2008 film Meerabai Not Out, Kulkarni stepped into Bollywood. The film was based on the love of Cricket in India with lead title role played by Mandira Bedi. The film proved to be average.

In 2012, Kulkarni's next venture was a biographical film Tukaram on the life of Varkari saint Tukaram. Kulkarni had been preparing for over three years on the film. The film received good reviews from critics as well as audience with Skati Salgaonkar from DNA calling it "one of the best Marathi films of 2012". Kulkarni was adjudged as the Best Director at the 19th Annual Colors Screen Awards and the film won the Best Film award.

== Personal life ==
Kulkarni was born in Hamdapur in 1963. He was married to the film actress Sonali Kulkarni for a brief time but later got divorced.

== Selected filmography ==
=== Director ===
Year	Title	Medium	Notes
1994	Wada Chirebandi	Play	
1996	Gandhi Virudh Gandhi	Play	Marathi and Hindi versions
	Chahul	Play	
	Yelkot	Play	
	Doctor Tumhi Sudha...	Play	
	Sati	Play	
1995	Dhyanimani	Play	
	Char Chaughi	Play	
1999	Bindhaast	Film	
	Pimpalpaan	TV series	
2002	Bhet	Film	
2005	Kaydyacha Bola	Film	
2007	Kadachit	Film	
2008	Meerabai Not Out	Film	Hindi language
2009	Maunraag	Play	
2009	Carry On Pandu	Film	Hindi language
2010	Bas Itna Sa Khwab Hai...!	Play	Hindi version of his play Dhyanimani
2011	Hamidabaichi Kothi	Play	
2011	Adhi Basu Mag Bolu	Play	
2012	Tukaram	Film	
2013	Aajcha Divas Majha	Film	
2014	Dusari Goshta	Film	Fictional biopic of Sushilkumar Shinde
2016	Family Katta	Film	
2022	Haravlelya Pattyancha Banglaa	Play	
2022	Charchaughi	Play	
2022	Sanjya Chhaya	Play	
2024	लंपन	TV Serial	Based On Marathi Book "वनवास" By प्रकाश नारायण संत.

=== Other roles ===
Year	Title	Credited as	Medium
1995	Bangarwadi	Actor	Film
2002	Bhet	Co-producer	Film
2005	Kaydyacha Bola	Story and screenplay writer	Film
2012	Pipani	Actor; Role: Narrator, Dnyaneshwar Tembhre	Film
2019	Mogra Phulaalaa	Actor	Film

== Awards ==
- 2012 – Tukaram : Best Film at the 19th Annual Colors Screen Awards
- 2012 – Tukaram : Best Director at the 19th Annual Colors Screen Awards
