= Kshitij Ye Nahi =

- Starring: See below
- Original language: Hindi
- No. of seasons: 1
- No. of episodes: 13

Original release
- Network: DD National
- Release: 1992 – 1993

Kshitij Ye Nahi is a 13-episode show broadcast on Doordarshan in the early 1990s.

== Synopsis ==
Supriya Pilgaonkar plays the protagonist, a young widow who lives with her 10-year-old daughter and her father-in-law (Vikram Gokhale). Some flashback scenes show her husband (Rajit Kapur), who had died. Tushar Dalvi plays her new love interest in the series.

== Cast ==
- Supriya Pilgaonkar as Nisha
- Tushar Dalvi as Shekhar
- Rajit Kapur as Akshay
- Vikram Gokhale as Akshay's Father
