= Dusari Goshta =

- Marathi film poster
- Directed by: Chandrakant Kulkarni
- Written by: Ajit; Prashant Dalvi
- Produced by: Dr Shailaja Gaikwad; Manjiri Hete; Prasad Mahadkar
- Starring: Vikram Gokhale; Prateeksha Lonkar; Renuka Shahane; Sandeep Mehta; Neha Pendse
- Music by: Ashok Patki; Mangesh Dhakde
- Release date: 2 May 2014
- Country: India
- Language: Marathi

Dusari Goshta (Marathi: दुसरी गोष्ट) is a 2014 Marathi-language Indian fictional biopic film by director Chandrakant Kulkarni, based upon former Home minister Sushilkumar Shinde's life, and tracking his journey from child to adult. Initial plans were for the film to release on 1 May 2014, to coincide with the Maharashtra Day holiday, and the film was released 2 May, in 200 theaters across Maharashtra. On 9 May, the film had a special screening in New Delhi at the Rashtrapati Bhavan presidential residence for President of India Pranab Mukherjee, and then Home minister Shinde.

== Background ==
As early as 2011, it was announced that filmmaker Ravi Sinha had decided to make a film Me Sushil Kumar Shinde based on the life of the minister Sushilkumar Shinde. On 16 April 2014, it was announced that Kulkarni had actually done so and that the project had completed filming and was nearing release. The film's trailer was then released on 22 April.

== Plot ==
A young boy from the lower caste resorts to petty thefts to make both ends meet after he lost his father at the early age. Once the boy realizes the importance of an education, he begins to improve his life and never looks back. Through diligence and dedication, he climbs the social and political ladder to success.

== Cast ==
- Vikram Gokhale
- Prateeksha Lonkar
- Renuka Shahane
- Sandeep Mehta
- Neha Pendse
- Siddharth Chandekar
- Anand Ingle
- Aditya Ganu
- Bharati Patil
- Smita Sarvade
- Sunil Tawde
- Girish Joshi
- Mugdha Godbole
- Aafrid Shaikh

== Reception ==
The Times of India noted the film's viewpoint shifting back and forth through time with the elderly Prasanna persona reflecting upon and reliving and reviving memories of his past and that, even with the character names being different from those of the real life personages being shown, the viewer has no doubt about whom the film is about. They concluded, "Dusari Goshta excels in every department, be it Chandrakant's direction, Vikram-Sandeep-Siddharth's acting, the cinematography or art direction. It takes you through the political journey of many prominent politicians and events that change the course of India's political history."

== Soundtrack ==
Giving it three stars, the Times of India praised the film's music, writing "The soundtrack of Dusari Goshta boasts of soulful melody and lyrics with deep meaning. With just two tracks, Dusari Goshta is an album for keeps."

1. Khelnare haat pai, sung by Shankar Mahadevan, with Vidit Patankar and Pallavi Aandev on backup vocals.
2. Mani achanak hal le kahi, sung by Mangesh Dhakde and Kirti Killedar

The Times of India wrote "Both songs are unique in their own way. While Khelnare... has Shankar dominating the track with his sombre vocals, the duet ballad 'Mani achanak....' is a soft number that is easy on the ears."
