= Renuka Shahane =

Indian actress (born 1966)

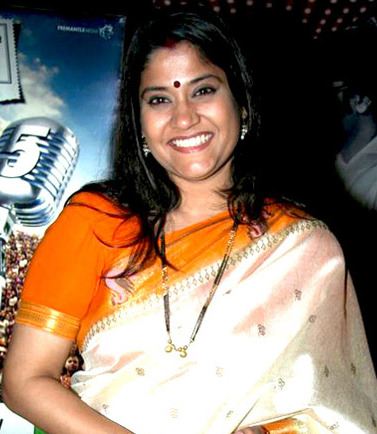
- Shahane in 2010
- Born: 7 October 1966 (age 60); Mumbai, Maharashtra, India
- Education: St. Xavier's College (B.A); University of Mumbai
- Occupations: Actress; film director; screenwriter
- Years active: 1988–Present
- Spouses: Vijay Kenkare (divorced) Ashutosh Rana (m. 2001)
- Children: 2
- Mother: Shanta Gokhale

Renuka Shahane (born 7 October 1966) is an Indian actress who is widely known for her work in the Hindi and Marathi films and several television productions. She is best known as the co-presenter of the Doordarshan TV show Surabhi (1993–2001). She has received several awards and nominations including a Filmfare Awards Marathi.

== Early life ==
Renuka Shahane was born into a Marathi family in Mumbai. Her father, Lt. Cdr. Vijay Kumar Shahane, was an officer in the Indian Navy. Her mother, Shanta Gokhale, is a theatre personality and film critic who works mainly on Marathi theatre. When Renuka was very young, her mother divorced her father and married Arun Khopkar, a film-maker. The second marriage also ended in divorce.

Shahane and her only sibling, Girish, grew up with their mother in Mumbai. Shahane did her B.A. in Psychology from St. Xavier's College and her Post graduation in Clinical Psychology from Mumbai University.

Her brother Girish Shahane is a contemporary writer, art critic, and artist who has been associated with several art fairs and is a columnist with Scroll.in.

== Personal life ==
Shahane has been married twice. Her first marriage was to Vijay Kenkare, a veteran Marathi theater writer and director, but the marriage did not last long and they were soon divorced. She then married Ashutosh Rana (original name Ashutosh Neekhra), who is also a Bollywood actor. They have two sons, namely Shauryaman Neekhra and Satyendra Neekhra. Renuka Shahane is an atheist.

== Career ==
Shahane started her career with the Marathi film Hach Sunbaicha Bhau. She then worked as one of the two anchors of the popular Hindi language TV show, Surabhi, and this is what made her a household name. Her broad smile became a byword for charm in the era when Doordarshan was the only TV channel in India, and Renuka was one of the most popular TV personalities of the 1980s.

In 1994, at the height of her fame while hosting Surabhi, Renuka got the opportunity to act in the movie Hum Aapke Hain Koun..!, that soon became the highest grossing Indian movie. Her role in the film was much appreciated and added to her image of a storehouse of wholesome, traditional values. She starred in the Marathi film "Aboli" for which she was widely praised and lead her to win Filmfare Award Marathi Best Actress at Filmfare Awards Marathi in the year 1995.

Shahane has acted in many Marathi films. She released her first Marathi film as a director, called Rita. Adapted from her mother Shanta Gokhale's novel, Rita Welingkar, Renuka plays the pivotal role of a friend, guide and philosopher of Rita, the protagonist. Rita had Jackie Shroff, Pallavi Joshi, Suhasini Mulay and Mohan Agashe in the cast. She also acted in a Telugu movie Money, produced by Ram Gopal Varma, which was a big hit.

Circus was one of the initial Indian television serials that she starred in. She portrayed the love interest of then relatively unknown Shah Rukh Khan's character. Her role as a strong-willed woman in another television serial, Imtihaan was widely appreciated. Tribhanga is Renuka Shahane's first Hindi directorial starring Kajol, Tanvi Azmi, Mithila Palkar, Kunaal Roy Kapur, Vaibhav Tatwawaadi, Manav Gohil, Kanwaljeet Singh, Shweta Mehendale, Nishank Verma.

== Filmography ==
=== Films ===
Year	Title	Role	Language	Ref.
1988	Tamacha	Rashmi	Hindi	
1992	Aapli Mansa	Mary	Marathi	
1992	Haach Sunbaicha Bhau	Nandita	Marathi	
1992	Hun Hunshi Hunshilal	Parveen	Gujarati	
1993	Money	Renu	Telugu	
1994	Hum Aapke Hain Koun..!	Pooja	Hindi	
1994	Money Money	Renu	Telugu	
1995	Aboli	Bappa's daughter	Marathi	Filmfare Award Marathi Best Actress
1996	Masoom	Yashoda	Hindi	
1997	Tunnu Ki Tina	Tinnu's first girlfriend	Hindi	
2002	Tum Jiyo Hazaaron Saal	Hema	Hindi	
2003	Ek Alag Mausam	Rita	Hindi	
2004	Dil Ne Jise Apna Kahaa	Rishabh's sister	Hindi	
2006	Sun Zarra	Gauri Shankar's wife	Hindi	
2009	Rita	Saraswati	Marathi	
2014	Bhakarkhadi 7 km	Dr. Sameer's mother	Marathi	
2014	Dusari Goshta	–	Marathi	Guest appearance
2014	Akalpith	Dr. Mugdha	Marathi	
2015	Highway	Renuka	Marathi	
2015	Te Aath Diwas	Vasundhara	Marathi	
2015	Janiva	Lawyer Charitra Dharamadhikari	Marathi	
2018	3 Storeys	Flory Mendonca	Hindi	
2018	Bucket List	Anjali Deshpande	Marathi	
2018	Gulabjaam	Guest appearance	Marathi	
2019	Smile Please	Guest appearance	Marathi	
2021	Tribhanga	Writer and director	Hindi	
2022	Govinda Naam Mera	Asha Waghmare	Hindi	
2022	Chakda 'Xpress	N/A	Hindi	Unreleased
2025	Devmanus	Laxmi	Marathi	
2025	Uttar	Uma Bhalerao	Marathi	

=== Television ===
Year	Title	Role	Language	Ref.
1989–1990	Circus	Maria	Hindi	
1990	Yeh Hui Naa Baat		Hindi	
1993–2001	Surabhi	Host	Hindi	
1994	Imtihaan	Sister	Hindi	
1994	Aasmaan Se Agay		Hindi	
1994	Junoon	Chandni	Hindi	
1995–1998	Sailaab	Shivani	Hindi	
1997	Mrs. Madhuri Dixit	Madhuri Dixit	Hindi	
1997-1998	Ghutan	Shamli	Hindi	
1997-1998	9 Malabar Hill	Suman	Hindi	
1998–1999	Kora Kagaz	Pooja	Hindi	
2001	Khamoshiyaan...Kab Tak	Mrs. Bashesh	Hindi	
2007	Jeete Hain Jiske Liye	Anjali Dhanrajgir	Hindi	
2010–2011	Jhalak Dikhhla Jaa 4	Contestant		
2010–2011	Hyala Jeevan Aise Naav	Host	Marathi	
2011	Fu Bai Fu	Judge	Marathi	
2011	Aawaj Mahrashtracha	Host	Marathi	
2011	Ladies First	Co-Host	Hindi	
2014	Mere Rang Mein Rangne Waali	Renuka Deshmukh	Hindi	
2015	Comedychi Bullet Train	Judge	Marathi	
2015	Kabhi Aise Geet Gaya Karo	Amrita	Hindi	
2018	Khichdi	Bawaskar Madam	Hindi	
2018	Chala Hawa Yeu Dya	Guest	Hindi	
2019	Kaun Banega Crorepati 12	Guest	Hindi	
2020	The Kapil Sharma Show	Guest	Hindi	
2022	Band Baja Varat	Judge	Marathi	

=== Web series ===
Year	Title	Role	Language	Ref.
2018-2019	What the Folks	Vandu Solanki	Hindi	
2022	First Second Chance	Vaidehi	Hindi	
2025	Dupahiya	Pushpalata Yadav	Hindi	
2026	Aga Aai Aaho Aai	Janaki	Marathi	
