= Nirmiti Sawant =

Indian film and television actress

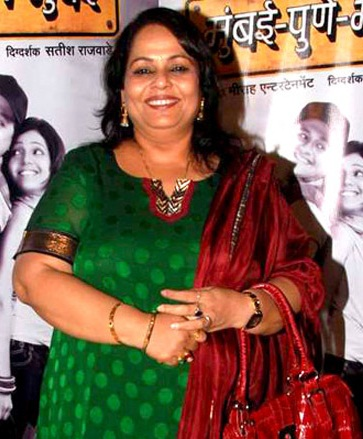
- Sawant in 2012
- Born: Madhumati Desai; 30 January 1958 (age 68); Delhi, India
- Occupation: Actress
- Years active: 1991–present
- Spouse: Mahesh Sawant (died)
- Children: 1

Nirmiti Sawant is a Marathi actress, who mainly acts in Marathi films, television and dramas. She became popular after her performance in daily TV soap Kumari Gangubai Non-Matric along with Pandharinath Kamble.

This was followed by a series of films and theatre performances, which added to her repertoire and have increased her popularity in the Marathi film and theatre industry. She is also known for her comedy play Jau Bai Jorat. She was one of the judges for the comedy reality show Fu Bai Fu on Zee Marathi TV channel. She was previously working on 1760 Sasubai for ETV Marathi TV channel. She was last seen on Jadubai Jorat which aired on Zee Marathi.

== Personal life ==
She was married to Mahesh Sawant, who died when their son was still very young. and has a son named Abheney Sawant, also an actor.

== Filmography ==
| Year | Title | Role | Refs |
|---|---|---|---|
| 1991 | Chaukat Raja | Mrs. Sawant as society member | |
| 1999 | Bindhaast | Warden | |
| 2000 | Navra Mazya Muthit Ga | Vatrika | |
| 2004 | Navra Maza Navsacha | Aatya | |
| 2005 | Kay Dyache Bola | Saraswati Bai | |
| 2005 | Khabardaar | Gauri Shringarpure | Maharashtra State Film Award for Best Comedian |
| 2006 | Hee Porgi Kunachi | Sushila Sawant | Maharashtra State Film Award for Best Comedian |
| 2006 | Shubhamangal Savadhan | Najuka Aatya | |
| 2008 | Amhi Satpute | Doctor | |
| 2008 | Valu | Pandit's Wife | |
| 2008 | Shyamchi Mummy | Shyam's Mother | |
| 2008 | Sasu Numbari Jawai Dus Numbari | Laxmibai | |
| 2009 | Nishani Dava Angatha | Bokil bai | |
| 2009 | Nau Mahine Nau Diwas | Mrs. Deshmukh | |
| 2009 | Topi Ghala Re | Sulakshanatai Chaubal | |
| 2010 | Horn 'Ok' Pleassss | Ria's Mother | |
| 2010 | Ideachi Kalpana | Jaywanti Barshinge/Basanti | |
| 2010 | Chal Dhar Pakad | Komal Patil | |
| 2012 | Aiyyaa | Meenakshi's mother | |
| 2013 | Kumari Gangubai Non-Matric | Gangubai | |
| 2013 | Ekulti Ek | Inspector Sarjerao | |
| 2014 | Akalpith | Mrs. Saranjame | |
| 2015 | Bai Go Bai | Baijakka | |
| 2017 | Mala Kahich Problem Nahi | Ajay's Mother | |
| 2018 | Hichyasathi Kay Pan | Bhargavi's Mother | |
| 2018 | Shubh Lagna Savdhan | Aniket's Mother | |
| 2019 | Ashi Hi Aashiqui | Rakhamma | |
| 2021 | Jhimma | Nirmala Konde Patil | |
| 2023 | Aalay Mazya Rashila | Aatya Bai | |
| 2023 | Maharashtra Shahir | Krishna's Grandmother | |
| 2023 | Satyaprem Ki Katha | Christmas Masi | |
| 2023 | Jhimma 2 | Nirmala Konde Patil | |
| 2024 | Navra Maza Navsacha 2 | Lamby's mother | |
| 2025 | Uttar | Shanta Khanvilkar | |
| 2026 | Krantijyoti Vidyalay Marathi Madhyam | Ms. Narvekar | |
| 2026 | Aga Aga Sunbai! kay Mhantay Sasubai? | Smita | |
| 2026 | Super Duperr | Laxmi | |
| 2026 | Bhagubai | Bhagubai | |
| 2026 | Cup Bashi | Aruna Karekar | |

== Television ==
| Year | Title | Role | Notes |
|---|---|---|---|
| 1994-2000 | Tu Tu Main Main | Prema Buaji | Recurring role |
| 2004-2006 | Kumari Gangubai Non-Matric | Gangubai | Debut |
| 2009 | Constable Kamana Kamtekar | Constable Kamana Kamtekar | |
| 2010-2011 | Fu Bai Fu | Judge | |
| 2011-2012 | Hapta Band | Host | Reality Show |
| 2013 | Aambat Goad | Bacchu Aatya | |
| 2013-2014 | 1760 Sasubai | Constable 1760 Amba | |
| 2017 | Jadubai Jorat | Jui Samant | |
| 2021 | Bigg Boss Marathi 3 | Herself | Guest appearance |
| 2022 | Kitchen Kallakar | Judge | |
| 2022 | Fu Bai Fu | Judge | |
| 2022 | Bus Bai Bas | Herself | Guest appearance |
| 2026 | Aga Aai Aaho Aai | | |

== Plays ==
- Jau Baai Jorat
- Chuk Bhul Dyavi Ghyavi
- Shree Swami Samarth
- Kumari Gangubai Metric
- Shyamchi Mummy
- Vacuum Cleaner
- Sanjya Chhaya
- Aajji Bai Jorat
