= DD Sahyadri =

Marathi-language state-owned Indian Channel

- Country: India
- Broadcast area: India
- Network: DD (Doordarshan)
- Headquarters: Mumbai, Maharashtra, India

Programming
- Language: Marathi
- Picture format: 1080i HDTV

Ownership
- Owner: Prasar Bharati
- Sister channels: DD National; DD News

History
- Launched: 15 August 1994
- Former names: RLSS Marathi (DD 10) (1994 – 2000)

Links
- Website: Official Website

DD Sahyadri is a Marathi TV channel. It is a regional channel dedicated to Maharashtra. It shows Marathi serials, news, films infotainment and educational programs about agriculture, healthcare, and other subjects. It is part of Doordarshan network. It is a free-to-air channel.

== Name ==
The name 'Sahyadri' in 'DD Sahyadri' comes from the a group of hills in the Western Ghats. This is similar to how other regional DD channels are named.

== History ==
2 October 1972 (Gandhi Jayanti): Doordarshan Kendra Mumbai started broadcasting two hours a day on DD National in black-and-white. The transmission was broadcast using a small transmitter that served few TV households. The station broadcast on channel 4 from 6 to 10pm every evening, with additional schools programming on Mondays, Wednesdays and Fridays. A second station in Poona on channel 5 was added in 1973. Regional service started on 9 August 1986.

15 August 1994 (Independence Day): DD Sahyadri was launched as separate channel as RLSS Marathi (DD 10) throughout India.

2 June 1999: A new studio for DD Sahyadri was inaugurated.

1 January 2000: DD 10 broadcast time increased to seventeen hours a day.

5 April 2000: DD 10 was renamed DD Sahyadri.

== Description ==
DD Sahyadri broadcasts serials, informative programmes, public debates, and film-based programmes. Old and new Marathi films are aired on this channel. DD Sahyadri offers about six to eight event properties a year with the big ones being the annual DD Awards, Hirkhani Awards (felicitating women achievers) and the Navaratan Awards. DD Sahyadri is supported by Doordarshan studios in Mumbai, Pune and Nagpur. It makes an annual live telecast of Dahihandi Mahotsav from Thane.

DD Sahyadri's Mission is "to inform, educate and entertain Marathi knowing people in their language, idiom and culture" and to showcase "the real Maharashtra culture, its values, traditions, modernisation, diversity and its unity through programmes of high quality in the highest tradition of public service broadcasting with true Indian national spirit".

== Competitors and Ranking ==
The channel competes with private channels such as Zee Marathi, Colors Marathi, Star Pravah, Sony Marathi and Zee Yuva and FTA channels such as Fakt Marathi. In the TAM report for the week ending on 5 March 2011, DD Sahyadri was ranked the most watched Marathi-language channel with 32.4% reach. Sahyadri was also considered the best regional TV channel among the other regional Doordarshan TV channels. In week 47 of 2020, 7 Chya Batmya came in the top 5 Marathi TV shows. Also, in lockdown of 2020, 7 Chya Batmya topped the TRP charts.

== Monthly Programme Composition ==
=== New versus Repeat Programmes in a Month ===
Type of Programme	Number of Hours	Percentage
New Programmes	367	51.1%
Repeat Programmes	353	48.9%
Total Transmission	720	100.0%

=== Classification of Programmes in a Month ===
Type of Programme	Percentage
1. In-House Programme Productions	80.5%
(i) News & Current Affairs	14.5%
(ii) Marathi Film & Film Based	13.6%
(iii) In-House Programmes	52.2%
2. Sponsored Programmes	8.1%
3. Others (Fillers/Promos/Balchitrawani/Announcements)	11.4%
Total	100%

=== Categories of Programmes in a Month ===
Number	Type	Percentage
(i)	Sports	0.73%
(ii)	Public Service	13.24%
(iii)	Entertainment	44.30%
(iv)	Educational	10.98%
(v)	News, Current Affairs, Parliament/Assembly	14.45%
(vi)	Health	1.76%
(vii)	Children	3.08%
(viii)	Other (Slides/Titles/Promos)	11.46%
	Total	100%

== News ==
=== News Bulletin Timings ===
No.	Start	End
1	8:30 am	9:00 am
2	11:00 am	11:30 am
3	1:00 pm	1:30 pm
4	4:30 pm	5:00 pm
5	7:00 pm	7:30 pm
6	9:30 pm	10:00 pm

=== News Headlines Timings ===
No.	Time	
1	08:30 am	
2	11:30 am	
3	02:30 pm	
4	05:00 pm	except Sat-Sun
5	07:00 pm	
6	09:30 pm	

=== Ratings ===
Week	Year	BARC Viewership	
Week	Year	TRP	Rank
Week 47	2015	1.3	5
Week 12	2020	2.0	2
Week 14	2020	2.1	1
Week 15	2020	1.9	1
Week 16	2020	1.7	1
Week 17	2020	1.7	1
Week 18	2020	1.3	1
Week 19	2020	1.1	1
Week 20	2020	1.2	1
Week 21	2020	0.7	5
Week 25	2020	1.1	1
Week 26	2020	1.4	1
Week 27	2020	1.4	2

== Technology ==
DD Sahyadri is broadcast from eight high power transmitters in Maharashtra located in:

- Aurangabad
- Ambajogai
- Chandrapur
- Jalgaon
- Mumbai
- Nagpur
- Pune
- Ratnagiri

== See also ==
- List of programs broadcast by DD National
- All India Radio
- Ministry of Information and Broadcasting
- DD Free Dish
- List of South Asian television channels by country
