= Ashok Patki =

Indian music director

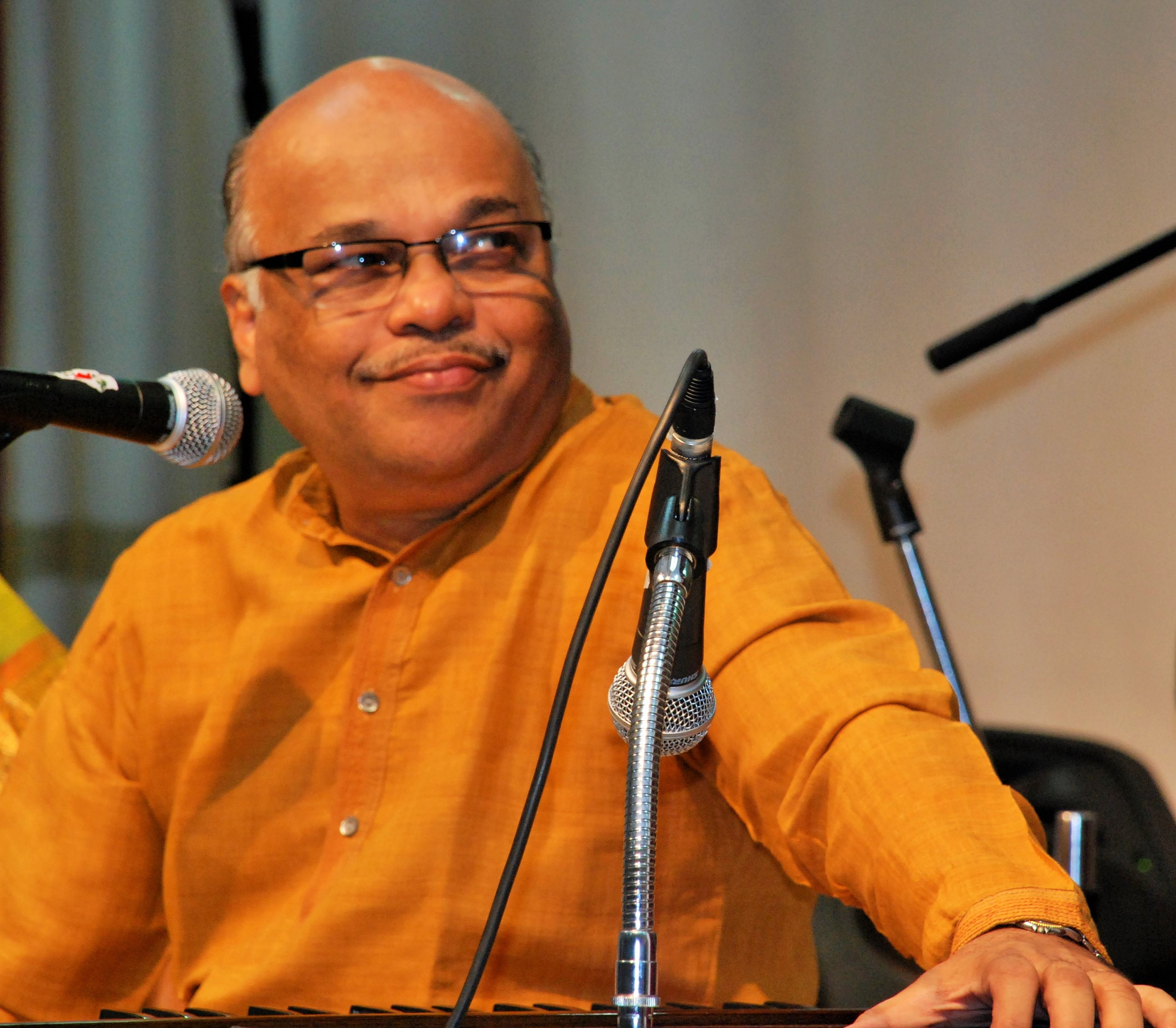
- Born: 25 August 1941 (age 85); Mumbai, Bombay Presidency, British India
- Occupations: Music director, composer
- Years active: 1969–present
- Awards: National Film Award for Best Music Direction (2006)

Ashok Patki (born 25 August 1941) is an Indian music director and composer; working predominantly in Marathi cinema, theatre and television. He is best known for his very popular compositions like "Mile Sur Mera Tumhara", "Purab Se Surya Uga". Patki has also composed over 5000 jingles and has been awarded with Indian National Film Award for Best Music Direction at 54th National Film Awards in 2006 for a Konkani film, Antarnaad.

== Early life ==
Patki was born on 25 August 1941 to a Maharashtrian family in Mumbai. He completed his secondary schooling in Gopi Tank Municipal school and is followed by a sister and two brothers. With his growing interest in music, Patki did not show much interest in schooling and decided not to complete his college education. In 2012, Patki wrote a book about his career named as "Saptasur Majhe" ("My Seven Notes"). The book was written in Marathi language and was launched by Manovikas Prakashan. Though Patki did not receive any formal training in music, in August 2013, he started a music school in Pune named as "Sanchari Gurukul", mainly focusing on light and semi-classical Hindustani music, better known as "Sugam Sangeet". Patki noted that the school "aims at bringing back the traditional guru-shishya parampara (master-pupil tradition) in teaching music."

== Early career and success ==
Since childhood, Patki started playing two Indian musical instruments – Tabla and Harmonium. Patki practised his musical skills with his neighbour and then struggling music composer Sudhir Phadke. During initial days, Patki accompanied his sister Meena for her musical programs with local orchestra. He was later introduced to the Marathi entertainment industry by singer-composer Jitendra Abhisheki and started composing music for children's stage plays.

Patki worked as an assistant with Jitendra Abhisheki for background music for theatre and S. D. Burman, Shankar Jaikishan, R. D. Burman, Robin Banerjee for film music. The flutist Pandit Hariprasad Chaurasia made Patki certified musician for All India Radio. Patki had started his career as a composer with a devotional album for singer Suman Kalyanpur's album Gaani- Ekdach Yave Sakhya and later accompanied her as a composer for her stage shows abroad. He also started composing music for Marathi theatre with the plays like "Moruchi Mavshi", "Bramhachari" and "Eka Lagnachi Gostha". Patki worked in the advertising field and composed more than 5000 jingles. His first jingle was for Dhantak's Double B soap; it was played on Aakashwani every day at 8 am for over 2 decades. Some of his very popular jingles includes "Dhara Dhara", "Jhandu Baam" and "Santoor".

Patki shot to fame with his song and accompanying video promoting national integration and unity in diversity, "Mile Sur Mera Tumhara". The song was composed by Patki, co-composed and arranged by Louis Banks, with lyrics by Piyush Pandey. The song achieved critical acclaim and is considered as "The unofficial Indian anthem". He has been awarded with Indian National Film Award for Best Music Direction at 54th National Film Awards in 2006 for a Konkani film, Antarnaad.

== Filmography ==
Title	Film	Theatre	Television	Single	Notes
Aabhalmaya			Yes		Marathi series on Zee Marathi; Singer: Devaki Pandit; Lyrics: Mangesh Kulkarni
Aahe Maja Jagayat				Yes	Singer: Swapnil Bandodkar; Lyrics: Ashok Patki
Aai Pahije	Yes				
Aai Shappath..!	Yes				
Aal Ga Bai Aangani				Yes	Singer: Suman Kalyanpur; Lyrics: Ashok Paranjpe
Aale Manat Mazya				Yes	Singer: Suman Kalyanpur; Lyrics: Ramesh Anaavkar
Aandhatar		Yes			
Aamhi Asu Ladke	Yes				
Aapli Manasa	Yes				
Aata Me Kashi Diste	Yes				
Aavhan	Yes				
Abhimaan	Yes				Background Music
Abhinetri		Yes			
A Dot Com Mom	Yes				
Agnidivya	Yes				
Alisha	Yes				Konkani film
Antarnad	Yes				Konkani film
Anandache Jhaad	Yes				
"Anuragache Themb Jhelti"				Yes	Singer: Anuradha Paudwal; Lyrics: Shantaram Nandgaonkar
Ardhangi	Yes				
Ashi Pakhre Yeti		Yes			
Ashi Rat Sarli				Yes	Singer: Suman Kalyanpur; Lyrics: Ashok Paranjpe
Avachit Aale Nav Tujhe				Yes	Singer: Sadhana Sargam; Lyrics: Ravindra Awati
Balkadu		Yes			
Barrister		Yes			
Bhet	Yes				
Bindhaast	Yes				
Bramhachari		Yes			
Chingi	Yes				
Chinu	Yes				
Daari Paus Padato				Yes	Singer: Suman Kalyanpur; Lyrics: Ashok Paranjpe
De Taali	Yes				
Debu	Yes				
Deep Lavale Jyoti Gaati				Yes	Singer: Suman Kalyanpur; Lyrics: Ashok Paranjpe
Deevana Jhalo Tujha				Yes	Singer: Mangesh Borgaokar; Lyrics: Mandar Cholkar
Dhamaal Babalya Ganapyachi	Yes				
Diasta Tasa Nasta		Yes			
Disha Disha Ujalalya				Yes	Singer: Suman Kalyanpur; Lyrics: Ashok Paranjpe
Divasa Tu Ratri Mi		Yes			
Durge Durghatbhari	Yes				
Ek Daav Sansaracha	Yes				
Ek Gaadi Baaki Anadi	Yes				
Eka Lagnachi Goshta		Yes			
Ekdach Yaave Sakhya				Yes	Singer: Suman Kalyanpur; Lyrics: Ashok Paranjpe
Fakta Tuzi sath Haviye		Yes			
Foreignchi Patlin	Yes				
Full 3 Dhamaal	Yes				
Galgale Nighale	Yes				
Gandhi Virudhda Gandhi		Yes			
Garam Masala	Yes				
Ghanghor Barasti Dhara				Yes	Singer: Anuradha Paudwal; Lyrics: Shantaram Nandgaonkar
Ghulam Begam Badsha	Yes				
God Bless You		Yes			
Godi Gulabi	Yes				
Goshta Dhamal Namyachi	Yes				
Gupit Ek Saangte				Yes	Singer: Suman Kalyanpur; Lyrics: Ashok Paranjpe
Gotya			Yes		Marathi series on Doordarshan; Singer: Arun Ingle; Lyrics: Madhukar Arkade
Hallagulla	Yes				
Hasat Khelat		Yes			
Hech Majha Maher	Yes				
Hi Porgi Kunachi	Yes				
Hirvya Makhamalivar				Yes	Singer: Devaki Pandit; Lyrics: Pramod Bejkar
Jadu Teri Najar		Yes			
Jamala Ho Jamala	Yes				
Janta Janardan	Yes				
Jau Devachiya Gava		Yes			
Jodi Tuzi Mazi		Yes			
Kaalokh Datuni Aala				Yes	Singer: Suresh Wadkar; Lyrics: Shantaram Nandgaonkar
Kabadi Kabadi		Yes			
Kal Rati Swapnamdhye				Yes	Singer: Suman Kalyanpur; Lyrics: Shantaram Nandgaonkar
Kalam 302		Yes			
Karayalo Gelo Ek		Yes			
Katha Don Ganpatravanchi	Yes				
Ketkichya Bani Tithe				Yes	Singer: Suman Kalyanpur; Lyrics: Ashok Paranjpe
Khabardar	Yes				
Khurchi Samrat	Yes				
Kidnap		Yes			
Kis Baai Kis	Yes				
Konasathi Konitari	Yes				
Kuni Nindave Va Vandade				Yes	Singer: Suman Kalyanpur; Lyrics: Ashok Paranjpe
Kunitari Pahil Choruniya				Yes	Singer: Suman Kalyanpur; Lyrics: Ashok Paranjpe
Lagnabambal		Yes			
Lagnachi Bedi		Yes			
Lahanpan Dega Deva		Yes			
Lavni Ek Tamasha	Yes				
Lovebirds		Yes			
Maamla Porincha	Yes				
Madanrang		Yes			
Maduchandrachi Raat	Yes				
Majha Ghar		Yes			
Majha Mulga	Yes				
Majhya Save				Yes	Singer: Bela Shende; Lyrics: Kedar Parulekar
Mala Ek Chanas Hava	Yes				
Mee Sindhutai Sapkal	Yes				
Mi Nahi Tu Tu Nahi Mi				Yes	Singer: Suman Kalyanpur; Lyrics: Ashok Paranjpe
Mile Sur Mera Tumhara				Yes	Singer: Suman Kalyanpur; Lyrics: Ashok Paranjpe
Mi Nathuram Godse		Yes			
Mission Champion	Yes				
Mitra		Yes			
Moruchi Mavshi		Yes			
Mukya Hundkyanche				Yes	Singer: Suresh Wadkar; Lyrics: Pravinda Vane
Mumbai Aamchich	Yes				
Nanand Bhavjay	Yes				
Nanda Sokhaybhare		Yes			
Nati Goti		Yes			
Natsamrat		Yes			
Navasacha Por	Yes				
Navika Re Vaara Vaahe				Yes	Singer: Suman Kalyanpur; Lyrics: Ashok Paranjpe
O Mariya	Yes				Konkani film (Background Music)
Olakh Na Palakh		Yes			
One Room Kitchen	Yes				
Paijecha Veeda	Yes				
Pailtiri Ranamaji				Yes	Singer: Suman Kalyanpur; Lyrics: Ashok Paranjpe
Pakhara Ja Dur Deshi				Yes	Singer: Suman Kalyanpur; Lyrics: Ashok Paranjpe
Parambi	Yes				
Prem Karuya Khullam Khulla	Yes				
Punha Sahire Sahi		Yes			
Raadha Hi Bawari				Yes	Singer: Swapnil Bandodkar; Lyrics: Ashok Patki
Raanine Daav Jinkla	Yes				
Radhekrushna Naam				Yes	Singer: Swapnil Bandodkar; Lyrics: Ashok Patki
Rajane Wajavala Baaja	Yes				
"Ram Ki Kasam"				Yes	Singer: Vaishali Samant; Lyrics: Milind Joshi
Rangaat Rangato Shaamrang				Yes	Singer: Swapnil Bandodkar; Lyrics: Ashok Patki
Rangat Sangat	Yes				
Rani Aur Jaani	Yes				Music arranger
Reshimgaath	Yes				
Sakhi	Yes				
Sakhi Majhi	Yes				
Sambhavami Yuge Yuge		Yes			
Sardari Begum	Yes				Music assistant
Sargam		Yes			
Satvapariksha	Yes				
Savalee	Yes				
Savariya Dot Com	Yes				Konkani film
Shitu	Yes				Konkani film
Shri Siddhivinayak Mahima	Yes				
Shri Tashi Sou		Yes			
Shrimaan Shrimati			Yes		Hindi series on Doordarshan
Sonsakaal Zali				Yes	Singer: Suman Kalyanpur; Lyrics: Ashok Paranjpe
Sukhant	Yes				
Super Hit No.1		Yes			
Suryachi Pille		Yes			
Swatantryachi Aishi Taishi	Yes				
Tarun Turke Mhatare Ark		Yes			
Ti Fulrani		Yes			
Time Pass		Yes			
Tinhi Sanja	Yes				
To Mi Navhech		Yes			
Triveni Sangam		Yes			
"Tu Saptsur Majhe"				Yes	Singer: Suresh Wadkar; Lyrics: Ashok Patki
Tuzyat Mazyat		Yes			
Va Guru		Yes			
Vadalvaat			Yes		Marathi series on Zee Marathi; Singer: Devaki Pandit and Swapnil Bandodkar; Lyrics: Mangesh Kulkarni
Vat Ithe Swapnatil				Yes	Singer: Suman Kalyanpur; Lyrics: Ashok Paranjpe
Vishwas	Yes				
Vyakti Aani Valli		Yes			
Ya Asha Sanzveli Mi				Yes	Singer: Suman Kalyanpur; Lyrics: Ashok Paranjpe
Yach Divshi Yach Veli		Yes			
Yes Boss			Yes		Singers: Jaspinder Narula and Vinod Rathod
Dusari Goshta (2014)	Yes				

== Awards ==
Plays

- Natyadarpan Puraskar
  - 1996 – Priyatama
  - 2007 – Chaar Divas Premache
- Rangdarpan Puraskar
  - 1999 – Eka Lagnachi Gosht

Feature films

- Maharashtra State Film Awards
  - 1985 – Ardhangi
  - 1988 – Aapli Manasa
  - 2007 – Savalee
- National Film Awards
  - 2006 – Antarnad
- MICTA Marathi International Cinema and Theatre Awards
  - 2011 – Mee Sindhutai Sapkal
- Sursingar Puraskar
  - 1984 – Goshta Dhamal Namyachi
- V. Shantaram Puraskar
  - 2007 – Savalee

Other awards

- Ananya Puraskar
- Deenanath Mangeshkar Smruti Puraskar (Akhil Bhartiya Natya Aani Kalasankul)
- Gan-Samradnyi Lata Mangeshar Award
- Jankavi P. Savlaram Smruti Puraskar
- Lokshahir Vitthal Umap Smruti Puraskar
- Maharashtra State Cultural Puraskar for Sangitkshetratil 'Kaladan'
- Navartna Puraskar (Shyadri-Television)
- Ram Kadam Puraskar
- Sharad Ratna Gaurav Puraskar
- Vasuandhara Pandit Smruti Puraskar (Bharat Gayan Samaj)
- Zee Puraskar (Various Films, Dramas and Serials)
