= Chandralekha (1948 film) =

Indian film by S. S. Vasan

- Theatrical-release poster of the Tamil version
- Directed by: S. S. Vasan
- Written by: K. J. Mahadevan; Subbu; Sangu; Kittoo; Naina
- Produced by: S. S. Vasan
- Starring: T. R. Rajakumari; M. K. Radha; Ranjan
- Cinematography: Kamal Ghosh; K. Ramnoth (uncredited)
- Edited by: Chandru
- Music by: S. Rajeswara Rao (western/light music songs); M. D. Parthasarathy (classical/carnatic music songs)
- Production company: Gemini Studios
- Distributed by: Gemini Studios
- Release date: 9 April 1948
- Running time: 193–207 minutes (Note: UNESCO lists its runtime as 193 minutes, but One Hundred Indian Feature Films: An Annotated Filmography, Encyclopaedia of Indian Cinema and India's Ministry of Information and Broadcasting list it at 207 minutes.)
- Country: India
- Languages: Tamil; Hindi
- Budget: ₹3 million

Chandralekha (also spelt Chandraleka) (Note: Although the title card of the Tamil version reads Chandraleka, the Hindi version's title card reads Chandralekha, a spelling which has also been used frequently for the Tamil version.) is a 1948 Indian historical and adventure film produced and directed by S. S. Vasan of Gemini Studios. Starring T. R. Rajakumari, M. K. Radha and Ranjan, the film follows two brothers (Veerasimhan and Sasankan) who fight over ruling their father's kingdom and marrying a village dancer, Chandralekha.

Development began during the early 1940s when, after two successive box-office hits, Vasan announced that his next film would be entitled Chandralekha. However, when he launched an advertising campaign for the film he only had the name of the heroine from a storyline he had rejected. Veppathur Kittoo (one of Vasan's storyboard artists) developed a story based on a chapter of George W. M. Reynolds' novel, Robert Macaire: or, The French bandit in England. Original director T. G. Raghavachari left the film more than halfway through because of disagreements with Vasan, who took over in his directorial debut.

Originally made in Tamil and later in Hindi, Chandralekha spent five years in production (1943–1948). It underwent a number of scripting, filming and cast changes, and was the most-expensive film made in India at the time. Vasan mortgaged all his property and sold his jewellery to complete the film, whose cinematographers were Kamal Ghosh and K. Ramnoth. The music, largely inspired by Indian and Western classical music, was composed by S. Rajeswara Rao and M. D. Parthasarathy with lyrics by Papanasam Sivan and Kothamangalam Subbu.

Chandralekha was released on 9 April 1948. Although the film received generally positive reviews, it did not recoup its production costs. Vasan directed a Hindi version with some changes, including re-shot scenes, a slightly altered cast, and Hindi dialogues from Agha Jani Kashmiri and Pandit Indra. The Hindi version was released on 24 December of that year, becoming a box-office success. South Indian cinema became prominent throughout India with the film's release, and it inspired South Indian producers to market their Hindi films in North India.

== Plot ==
Veerasimhan and Sasankan are the sons of a king. When Veerasimhan rides through a village, he meets a local dancer named Chandralekha and they fall in love. At the palace, the king decides to abdicate his throne in favour of Veerasimhan. This enrages Sasankan, Veerasimhan's younger brother, who forms a gang of thieves; they embark on a crime spree. Chandralekha's father is injured in the ensuing chaos, and dies shortly afterwards and the orphaned Chandralekha joins a band of travelling musicians, whose caravan is raided by Sasankan's gang.

Sasankan orders Chandralekha to dance for him, which she does only after being flogged, but she soon escapes. He later ambushes Veerasimhan and takes him prisoner. Chandralekha watches Sasankan's men imprison Veerasimhan in a cave and seal its entrance with a boulder. She rescues him with the aid of elephants from a passing circus troupe. Veerasimhan and Chandralekha join the circus to hide from Sasankan's men. When Sasankan returns to the palace, he imprisons his parents, declares himself king and sends a spy to find Chandralekha.

The spy sees Chandralekha performing in the circus, and tries to capture her. Veerasimhan saves her; they escape and join a group of gypsies. When Veerasimhan goes to find help, Sasankan's men capture Chandralekha and bring her to the palace. When Sasankan tries to woo Chandralekha, she pretends to faint every time he approaches her. One of her circus friends comes to Sasankan disguised as a gypsy healer and claims that she can cure Chandralekha of her "illness". Behind locked doors, the two women talk. Sasankan is pleased to find Chandralekha miraculously cured and apparently ready to accept him as her husband; in return, he agrees to her request for a drum dance at the royal wedding.

Huge, platform-like drums are arranged in rows in front of the palace and Chandralekha joins the dancers, who dance on the drums. Sasankan is impressed with Chandralekha's performance but, unknown to him, Veerasimhan's soldiers are hiding inside the drums. As the dance ends, they rush out and attack Sasankan's men. Veerasimhan confronts Sasankan, and their lengthy sword fight ends with Sasankan's defeat and imprisonment. Veerasimhan releases his parents and becomes the new king, with Chandralekha as his queen.

== Cast ==
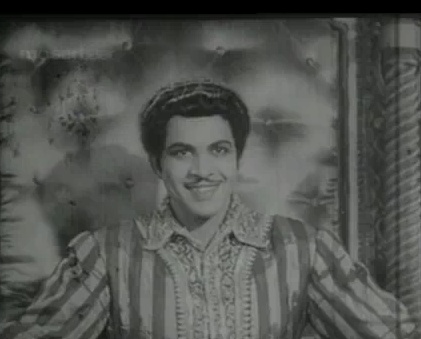
Ranjan in Chandralekha

Cast according to the song book:

- T. R. Rajakumari as Chandralekha
- M. K. Radha as Veerasimhan
- Ranjan as Sasankan
- M. S. Sundari Bai as Sogusu
- N. S. Krishnan as the circus buffoon
- T. A. Mathuram as circus girl
- L. Narayana Rao as the circus manager
- Subbaiah Pillai as Chandra's father
- V. N. Janaki as a gypsy girl
- V. S. Susheela as a gypsy girl
- Pottai H. Krishnamoorthy as a circus clown
- N. Ramamurthi as a circus clown
- T. A. Jayalakshmi as the palace nurse
- Appanna Iyengar as the music maestro
- T. E. Krishnamachariar as the king
- Kakinada Rajarathnam as the queen
- Seshagiri Bhagavathar as Singaru
- T. V. Kalyani as Singaru's wife
- N. Seetharaman as Veerasimhan's bodyguard
- Velayudham as Sasankan's menial assistant
- Veppathur Kittoo as a spy
- Ramakrishna Rao as a sepoy
- Varalakshmi as a circus girl
- Sundara Rao as an officer
- Surabhi Kamala as a gypsy woman
- Seetharaman as the cart driver
- N. Meera as Chandra's friend
- Vijaya Rao as a palace guard
- Sampathkumar as a palace guard
- Balaraman as a palace guard
- Gopala Krishnan as a palace guard
- 100 Gemini Boys & 500 Gemini Girls

== Production ==
=== Development ===
After the box office success of Bala Nagamma (1942) and Mangamma Sabatham (1943), producer S. S. Vasan of Gemini Studios wanted his next film to be made on a grand scale, with no budgetary constraints. He asked the story department—K. J. Mahadevan, Kothamangalam Subbu, Sangu, Naina and Veppathur Kittoo—to write a screenplay. They saw Mangamma Sabatham and Bala Nagamma as "heroine-oriented stories", and suggested a similar story. The group told the story of Chandralekha, a tough woman who "outwits a vicious bandit, delivers the final insult by slashing off his nose and, as a finishing touch, fills the bloodied gaping hole with hot, red chilli powder". Vasan disliked the story's gruesomeness and vulgarity; he rejected it, but kept the heroine's name.

Without waiting for a full story, Vasan announced that his next project would be entitled Chandralekha and publicised it heavily. Despite hard work by Gemini's writers, the story was not ready three months later. Vasan grew impatient, and told the writers that he would shelve Chandralekha in favour of Avvaiyyar (1953). After he gave them one more week, Kittoo discovered George W. M. Reynolds' novel, Robert Macaire, or the French Bandit in England. In the first chapter, he read:

A dark night in rural England and a mail coach convoy drawn by horses trots its way down a deserted leafy highway when suddenly, Robert Macaire, the fierce bandit and his henchmen emerge from the surrounding darkness and rob the convoy. Hiding under a seat is a young woman fleeing from a harsh, unhappy home. She is a dancer and when she refuses to dance the bandit whips her into submission.

Vasan was impressed when Kittoo told him a story based on the chapter. He decided to continue with the film, and named the heroine Chandralekha. Although the story was developed by Kittoo, it was credited to the entire Gemini story department. T. G. Raghavachari was hired as director.

=== Casting ===
The script had two major roles: princes in a kingdom, the elder of whom was the hero and the younger the villain. M. K. Radha was offered the part of Sasankan, the younger prince. Since he was then known for heroic roles, Radha was unwilling to play a villain and instead agreed to play the older prince, Veerasimhan. His wife Gnanambal persuaded Vasan to cast Radha in the role. K. J. Mahadevan (a member of Gemini's story department) was chosen by Vasan to play Sasankan. Although some footage of Mahadevan was filmed, his performance was considered "too soft" and he was removed; however, he remained on the project as a scriptwriter and assistant director. When Raghavachari suggested Ranjan as Sasankan, Vasan was reluctant; although the producer initially considered the actor too effeminate to play a "steel-hard villain", Vasan eventually relented. Ranjan had committed to B. N. Rao's Saalivaahanan (1945), but Kittoo persuaded him to test for Chandralekha and Rao gave the actor a few days off. The screen test was successful, and Ranjan was cast.

T. R. Rajakumari was chosen to play Chandralekha, replacing Vasan's first choice, K. L. V. Vasantha. Film historian Randor Guy believed Vasan chose Rajakumari over Vasantha because she was leaving Gemini for Modern Theatres. In April 1947 N. S. Krishnan, who had been convicted in the Lakshmikanthan murder case, was released from prison on appeal; Vasan recruited him and T. A. Mathuram to play the circus artists who help Veerasimhan rescue Chandralekha from Sasankan, with Mathuram's character named Sumathi. The script was rewritten, with scenes added to showcase the comic duo. P. A. Subbiah Pillai who played Venkatachalam in Gemini's Mangamma Sabatham, was credited as Subbiah Pillai and played Chandralekha's father. Madurai Sriramulu Naidu and S. N. Lakshmi made their acting debuts in the film; Naidu played a horseman, and Lakshmi was a dancer in the climactic drum-dance scene.

Struggling stage actor V. C. Ganeshamurthy (later known as Sivaji Ganesan), who had contacted Kittoo several times for a role in Chandralekha, was interested in a minor role as Veerasimhan's bodyguard and grew his hair long for the part. Kittoo eventually brought Ganeshamurthy to Vasan, who had seen him perform onstage. Vasan turned the actor down, calling him "totally unsuited for films" and telling him to choose another profession; the incident created a permanent rift between Vasan and Ganeshamurthy. The role of the bodyguard was eventually given to N. Seetharaman, who later became known as Javar Seetharaman. Kothamangalam Subbu's wife, Sundari Bai, played a circus performer who helps Chandralekha escape from Sasankan.

T. A. Jayalakshmi, in one of her earliest film roles, appeared briefly in one scene as a dancer. Veppathur Kittoo played Sasankan's spy and was an assistant director. Studio staff members, their families and passers-by were recruited as extras to play spectators in the circus scenes, and Vasan introduced Chandralekha in a voice-over during her circus performance.

=== Filming ===
During the making (of Chandralekha), our studio looked like a small kingdom ... horses, elephants, lions, tigers in one corner, palaces here and there, over there a German lady training nearly a hundred dancers on one studio floor, a shapely Sinhalese lady teaching another group of dancers on real marble steps adjoining a palace, a studio worker making weapons, another making period furniture using expensive rosewood, set props, headgear, and costumes, Ranjan undergoing fencing practice with our fight composer 'Stunt Somu', our music directors composing and rehearsing songs in a building ... there were so many activities going on simultaneously round the clock.

— Kothamangalam Subbu on the film's production at Gemini Studios

Chandralekha began filming in 1943. Raghavachari directed more than half of the film, but after differences of opinion with Vasan over the shooting of scenes at the Governor's Estate (now Raj Bhavan, Guindy) he left the project. Vasan subsequently took over the direction, marking his directorial debut.

The film did not originally include circus scenes. Vasan decided to add them halfway through production, and the screenplay was changed. For the scene where Veerasimhan is freed from a cave by elephants, "hundreds" of circus elephants were used. Kittoo travelled throughout South India and Ceylon (now Sri Lanka), seeing over 50 circuses before he chose the Kamala Circus Company and Parasuram Lion Circus; Vasan employed Kamala for a month. The circus scenes were shot by K. Ramnoth. Kittoo reminisced about the cinematographer's work:

In those days, we had no zoom lenses and yet Ramnoth did it. One night, while Chandralekha is performing on the flying trapeze, she notices the villain's henchman in the front row. She is on her perch high up and he is seated in a ringside chair. Shock hits her and to convey the shock the camera zooms fast from her to the man. Today, with a fast zoom shot it can be done very easily, but there was no such lens forty years ago. Ramnoth did it using the crane. He planned it well and rehearsed the shot for long. He took the shot 20 times and selected the best "take".

After Raghavachari's departure, the drum-dance scene he directed remained in the film. The scene involved 400 dancers and six months of daily rehearsals. It was designed by chief art director A. K. Sekhar, choreographed by Jayashankar and filmed with four cameras by Kamal Ghosh. Randor Guy estimated that the scene cost ₹500,000 (about US$105,000 in 1948); in his 2015 book, Madras Studios: Narrative, Genre, and Ideology in Tamil Cinema, Swarnavel Eswaran Pillai estimated that the scene cost ₹200,000—the entire budget of a typical Tamil film of the period. (Note: The 1948 exchange rate was 4.79 Indian rupees (₹) to one US dollar ($).) The scene included the Kathakali and Bharatanatyam classical dances and the Sri Lankan Kandyan dance. A. Vincent, who later became an established cinematographer and director in Malayalam cinema, assisted Ghosh in this film.

During post-production, Vasan asked Ramnoth his opinion of the scene when hundreds of Veerasimhan's warriors storm the palace to rescue Chandralekha from Sasankan. Although the scene's photography, shots and action had been unanimously praised by others, Ramnoth was quiet before saying that the suspense might be ruined if the scene was shown uncut. This sparked a discussion; Vasan advised the film editor Chandru to edit in accordance with Ramnoth's direction, and was impressed with the result. C. E. Biggs was the film's audio engineer.

Chandralekha was in production for five years (1943–1948), with changes to its story, cast and filming which generated substantial time and cost overruns. The film ultimately cost ₹3 million (about $600,000 in 1948), and was the most-expensive Indian film at the time. Vasan mortgaged all his property, received financial assistance from The Hindu editor Kasturi Srinivasan and sold his jewellery to complete the film. Adjusted for inflation, Chandralekha would have cost $28 million in 2010. According to historian S. Muthiah, with the free-floating exchange rate in effect at the time it was the first film with a budget of over a million dollars made outside the United States.

== Themes and influences ==
Although a period film, Chandralekha is not based on historical fact; its plot is based on the first chapter of Robert Macaire, or the French Bandit in England. Sasankan is based on Macaire and, according to film historian B. D. Garga, Chandralekha is "probably" based on a female dancer in the novel whom Macaire flogs when she refuses to dance; the film includes the scene from the novel. Garga noted that Chandralekha was also influenced by other Western literary and cinematic works, including the novel Blood and Sand (1908) and the films The Mark of Zorro (1920), Douglas Fairbanks in Robin Hood (1922), The Thief of Baghdad (1924) and Ben-Hur: A Tale of the Christ (1925). In December 1964, film historian Jerzy Toeplitz called the film an "extension and development" of the mythological genre: "The characters are mortals but behave like heavenly beings, and their movements and gestures, like those of the gods and heroes of the Mahabharata are impregnated with the miraculous." Toeplitz wrote that the story was a "mere pretext to hold together the different episodes, each of which builds up like a circus turn: the tension mounts to a culminating point, whereupon the next episode immediately takes over." According to Roy Armes' 1987 book, Third World Film Making and the West, Uday Shankar's 1948 Kalpana (also filmed at Gemini Studios) inspired Vasan to make Chandralekha. In the 2003 Encyclopaedia of Hindi Cinema, the film is described as a "Ruritanian period extravaganza".

The climactic sword fight between Veerasimhan and Sasankan has been compared to the fight in the 1894 novel, The Prisoner of Zenda. In 1976, American film historian William K. Everson compared the comedians in Chandralekha to Laurel and Hardy. Although Randor Guy considers the film's drum-dance scene the first of its kind in Indian cinema, the 1947 film Naam Iruvar includes a scene when the lead actress' younger sister dances on drums to the Tamil poet Subramania Bharati's "Kottu Murase"; French film historian Yves Thoraval wrote that it "prefigured the dance that Chandralekha made famous the very next year." According to American film critic Jonathan Rosenbaum, the film "belongs to the same childhood continuum" as Fritz Lang's 1959 films The Tiger of Eschnapur and The Indian Tomb, both of which were set in India. In his 2009 book, 50 Indian Film Classics, film critic M. K. Raghavendra wrote that Chandralekha was constructed in a manner which "enables its narrative to incorporate elements drawn from virtually any kind of genre." According to Guy, the setting of the song "Naattiya Kuthirai" with Sundari Bai (including her dance and costume) were inspired by the 1943 musical film Coney Island. Film scholar Uma Vangal wrote that the film reflects Vasan's "vision of a truly democratic nation, based on equal rights for men and women" by portraying "a world where men and women work together to establish a rightful rule".

== Music ==
Chandralekha's soundtrack was composed by S. Rajeswara Rao, with lyrics by Papanasam Sivan and Kothamangalam Subbu. R. Vaidyanathan and B. Das Gupta collaborated with M. D. Parthasarathy on the background music. Rajeswara Rao recalled in a 1993 interview for The Hindu that it took him over a year to compose the film's music, with much of his time devoted to the drum-dance scene: "As the dancers performed, we used to rehearse and compose the music. It was done with incredibly few instruments. We used a piano, ten double-bass violins, and drums from Africa, Egypt, and Persia which we have acquired from an African War troupe." Rao's salary was ₹1,500. The music was influenced by Carnatic and Hindustani music, Latin American and Portuguese folk music and Strauss waltzes. According to M. K. Raghavendra, Chandralekha has "snatches from [Richard] Wagner and [Nikolai] Rimsky-Korsakov (Scherezade) being used at dramatic moments."

"Naattiya Kuthirai", not originally part of the film, was added during final production. Sundari Bai spent over a month rehearsing the song. M. D. Parthasarathy was the sole singer of "Aathoram Kodikkalam" and co-singer of "Naattiya Kuthirai". J. Cooling Rajaiah played accordion and piano in the film's gypsy song. The circus chorus was adapted from "The Donkey Serenade" in Robert Z. Leonard's 1937 film, The Firefly. Vasan offered most of the songs on the Hindi soundtrack to Uma Devi, who later became popularly known as Tun Tun. She initially hesitated, feeling that "[they] were beyond her capabilities", but was supported by Rajeswara Rao, who "worked hard on her". "Sanjh Ki Bela", from the Hindi soundtrack, is loosely based on "Sanjh Ki Bela Panchhi Akela" from Jwar Bhata (1944). Chandralekha's music helped make it one of the most-successful Indian musical films of the 1940s, and it "created an atmosphere for a number of music directors influenced by Western music" in Tamil cinema.

== Marketing ==
The first advertisement for Chandralekha appeared on the back cover of the songbook for the film, Dasi Aparanji (1944). In the advertisement, Vasantha was the heroine before she was replaced by Rajakumari. (Note: Although S. Muthiah said the film's first announcement came in 1943, Randor Guy said in his book Starlight, Starbright that an early advertisement for Chandralekha appeared on the inside cover of the Nandanar songbook, which was published in September 1942.) With Chandralekha, Gemini was the first Tamil studio to attempt to distribute a film throughout India. According to film scholar P. K. Nair, it was the first Indian film with a full-page newspaper advertisement. In a 2010 Mumbai Mirror article, Vishwas Kulkarni wrote that ₹574,500 was spent on the film's newspaper publicity and ₹642,300 on posters, banners and billboards. Chandralekha's publicity campaign was the most expensive for an Indian film at the time; the publicity budget for a typical Indian film a decade earlier was about ₹25,000, and publicity for a "top Indian film" cost no more than ₹100,000 during the 1950s. According to Guy, the film's publicity campaign "made the nation sit up and take notice".

A. K. Shekhar designed the publicity material, which included posters, booklets and full-page newspaper advertisements. Gemini Studios, inspired by American cinema, also produced a publicity brochure for distribution to exhibitors and the press. It contained a synopsis of the film, a pictorial account of key plot points, and text for use by local theatres. The booklet also had layouts for women's pages, a pictorial account of suggested marketing activities (such as "How to drape an Indian sari: Theatre demonstrations have a big draw") and information about the film's costumes. The costumes were hand-woven silk and gold; one gold-embroidered riding jacket was considered "the most expensive piece of outfitting ever used in a motion picture."

== Release ==
Chandralekha was released on 9 April 1948 simultaneously in over 40 theatres throughout South India. A typical 1940s Tamil film was released in about ten towns, but Chandralekha was released simultaneously in 120 towns.

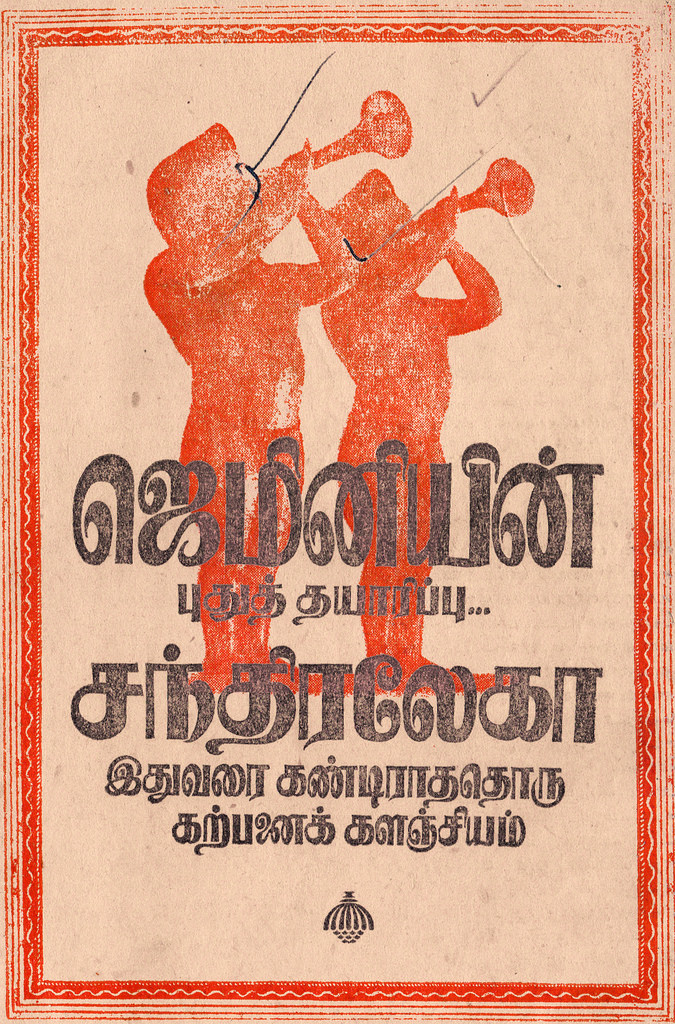
Advertisement for the Tamil version

The film was released in Japan as Shakunetsu-no kettō (灼熱の決闘; Fight Under the Red Heat) in April 1954, where it was distributed by Nippon Cinema Corporation (NCC). It was the first Tamil film dubbed in Japanese, and the second Indian film released in Japan; the first was the 1952 Hindi film Aan, which was released in Tokyo in January 1954. NCC later collapsed, and no information about Chandralekha's Japanese release survives. During the 1950s (when foreign currency was scarce in India), barter was a common means of exchange with overseas business partners; Reitaku University's Tamaki Matsuoka believes that this was the case with Chandralekha. An NCC pamphlet about the film called Vasan the "Cecil B. DeMille of the Indian film industry". A Danish version of the film, Indiens hersker (India's Ruler), was released on 26 April 1954. An abridged English-language version of Chandralekha, Chandra, was screened in the United States and Europe during the 1950s.

Despite the film's positive reviews and good box-office performance, it was unable to recover its large production costs; Vasan remade it in Hindi in an attempt to do so. The Hindi version, distributed by The Screens (a company in Bombay, now Mumbai), was released on 24 December 1948. With over 600 prints it was a commercial success, setting box-office records. (Note: According to The Times of India, the film was released with 609 prints worldwide; film historian S. Theodore Baskaran says it was released with 603 prints.) Vasan called Chandralekha "a pageant for our peasants", intended for "the war-weary public that had been forced to watch insipid war propaganda pictures for years." It was selected by the Indian government for screening at the fourth International Film Festival in Prague in 1949. The film's success made Madras a production centre for Hindi films. Five years after Chandralekha's success, Gemini paid its employees a bonus, one of the first studios in the world to do so. The Tamil version was re-released in 1950, with a new copy containing coloured sequences.

== Reception ==
=== Box office ===
Although exact figures for the film's box-office earnings are not available, film-trade websites provide estimates. Box Office India cited the Hindi version's nett earnings as ₹7 million, and said that it was the second-highest-grossing Hindi film of 1948 (after Shaheed). (Note: According to Box Office India, film tickets are subject to an "entertainment tax" in India and this tax is added to the ticket price at the box-office window. The amount of tax varies by state. "Nett gross figures are always after this tax has been deducted; gross figures are before the tax was deducted." Since 2003, the entertainment tax rate has significantly decreased; since 2010 a film's gross earnings can be 30–35 percent higher than nett gross, depending on where a film is released.) As of February 2009, the website gave Chandralekha's adjusted nett gross as ₹37,98,00,000. According to the 1998 book Indian cinema: A Visual Voyage, by India's Ministry of Information and Broadcasting, Chandralekha grossed ₹20 million (US$4.18 million). Film historian B. D. Garga said in his 2005 book, Art Of Cinema, "The two versions—Tamil and Hindi—grossed millions." Sharmishtha Gooptu states in her 2010 book, Bengali Cinema: An Other Nation, that Chandralekha grossed ₹10 million (about $2,100,000 in 1948) in India. A 2011 article by Namrata Joshi in Outlook says Chandralekha grossed ₹15.5 million with an audience of 30 million, "60% from rural India."

Overseas in Japan, the film earned ¥2,319,000 ($6,442) in ten days following its release in April 1954. It came close to the Japanese opening record of Aan, which had earned ¥2,386,032 in ten days when it released there earlier in January 1954.

=== Critical response ===
==== India ====
The drum-dance scene was considered Chandralekha's highlight by critics.

Chandralekha received generally-positive reviews from Indian critics. On 9 April 1948, an article in The Hindu said: "The Indian Screen has, indeed, in this Province or any other given us little that can bear comparison with Gemini's Chandraleka for the sheer magnificence of its backgrounds." In a review published on 10 April, a critic in an article for The Indian Express termed the film to be "essentially for the young of all ages and even the harassed house-wife will share the pleasure of children treated unexpectedly to a pride of lions, tigers, ponies and elephants showing their paces along with clowns and acrobats." A Dinamani article that day stated, "People who were depressed with the quality of our Tamil pictures so far can now raise their heads and hail proudly that a great picture can be produced in our land also." In contrast, Kumudam gave the film a lukewarm review: "Though the story is ordinary, the shocking events inserted into the narrative are something new to the Tamil cinema." The magazine criticised the film's songs and length, also noting the inconsistency in its time period where the king's office featured a wall clock and the king himself was writing with a quill. In its January 1949 issue Gundoosi magazine praised Chandralekha's Hindi version as an improvement on the Tamil version, noting that it had better dialogue and pacing.

V. A. K. Ranga Rao called it "the most complete entertainer ever made." (Note: The comment by Ranga Rao appears in Randor Guy's 1997 book, Starlight, Starbright: The Early Tamil Cinema. The year of the comment is not given.) In their 1988 book, One Hundred Indian Feature Films: An Annotated Filmography, Anil Srivastava and Shampa Banerjee praised Chandralekha's grandeur, battle scenes and drum dance, which in their opinion was the film's "raison d'etre". In 2003, S. Muthiah called it "an epic extravaganza worthy of Cecil B. de. Mille" and "larger-than-life." In their 2008 book, Global Bollywood: Travels of Hindi Song and Dance, Sangita Gopal and Sujata Moorti wrote that Chandralekha translated "the aesthetic of Hollywood Orientalism for an indigenous mass audience", while also opining the film's drum-dance scene was "perhaps one of the most spectacular sequences in Indian cinema." In his 2009 book, 50 Indian Film Classics, M. K. Raghavendra wrote: "Indian films are rarely constructed in a way that makes undistracted viewing essential to their enjoyment and Chandralekha is arranged as a series of distractions".

Raja Sen praised the film's set pieces, drum-dance sequence and the "longest swordfight ever captured on film" in May 2010 on Rediff, calling Chandralekha "just the kind of film, in fact, that would be best appreciated now after digital restoration." Randor Guy appreciated Rajakumari's performance in an October 2010 review, calling Chandralekha "her career-best" and saying that she "carried the movie on her shoulders." Guy also noted Radha was his "usual impressive self", saying that the film would be "remembered for: the excellent onscreen narration, the magnificent sets and the immortal drum dance sequence."

==== International ====
Reviewing the English version of Chandralekha, The New York Times called Rajakumari a "buxom beauty." (Note: The comment by The New York Times appears in the August 2007 issue of the magazine Galatta Cinema. The year of the comment is not given.) When the film was screened in New York City in 1976, William K. Everson said: "It's a colorful, naive and zestful film in which the overall ingenuousness quite disarms criticism of plot absurdity or such production shortcomings as the too-obvious studio "exteriors" ... Last but far from least, Busby Berkeley would surely have been delighted to see his influence extending to the climactic drum dance."

Jonathan Rosenbaum said in August 1981, "The prospect of a three-hour Indian film in [Tamil] with no subtitles is a little off-putting, I would say—wouldn't you?" However, Rosenbaum had "surprisingly little trouble following the plot and action" of the film: "This made-in-Madras costume drama makes for a pretty action-packed 186 minutes." In June 2009, K. S. Sivakumaran of Daily News Sri Lanka called Chandralekha "the first colossal [Tamil] film I saw." Malaysian author D. Devika Bai, writing for the New Straits Times in October 2013, praised its technical aspects: "At almost 68, I have not tired of watching the movie."

== Hindi version ==
Actor	Role
T. R. Rajkumari	Chandralekha
M. K. Radha	Veer Singh
Ranjan	Shashank
Sundri Bai	Sokasa
Yashodra Katju	circus girl
L. Narayan Rao	circus manager

The Hindi version of Chandralekha was Vasan's first film in the language. For this version, Vasan re-shot several scenes and used a slightly different cast. Agha Jani Kashmiri and Pandit Indra wrote the dialogue for the Hindi version, while Indra and Bharat Vyas were the lyricists. Rajeswara Rao, who composed the soundtrack for both versions, was assisted by Bal Krishna Kalla on the Hindi version, while Parthasarathy and Vaidyanathan composed this version's background music. The Tamil version was over 18,000 feet (5,500 m) long, (Note: While film historian Swarnavel Eswaran Pillai claims the Tamil version was 18,634 feet (5,680 m) long, the Tamil newspaper Maalai Malar claims it was 18,364 feet (5,597 m) long.) but the Hindi version was edited down to 14,495 feet (4,418 m).

Although Rajakumari, Radha and Ranjan reprised their roles in the Hindi version, Radha and Ranjan's characters were renamed. Radha's character was Veer Singh in the Hindi version, and Ranjan's character was renamed Shashank. Of the other cast members, N. S. Krishnan, T. A. Mathuram, T. E. Krishnamachari, Pottai Krishnamoorthy and N. Seetharaman appeared only in the Tamil version, and Yashodra Katju and H. K. Chopra appeared only in the Hindi version. Nearly the entire cast were credited in the Tamil version, but only six—Rajakumari (credited as Rajkumari), Radha, Ranjan, Sundari Bai (credited as Sundri Bai), Katju and Narayana Rao (credited as Narayan Rao)—were credited in the Hindi version.

== Legacy ==
With the film's success, Vasan became known as one of the best directors in Indian cinema. Kristin Thompson and David Bordwell, authors of Film History – An Introduction, called it "the biggest box-office hit of the decade." Guy later called Vasan the "Cecil B. DeMille of Tamil cinema", and called Chandralekha his "magnum opus." According to S. Muthiah, Vasan "pioneered making South Indian films in English." He inspired producer A. V. Meiyappan, who became a "master at publicity." The Hindi version's success gave South Indian producers the opportunity to market their Hindi films in North India. Chandralekha's publicity campaign had such an impact that Bombay producers passed a resolution that a limit should be imposed on advertisements for any film in periodicals. Vasan's Apoorva Sagodharargal (1949), also a success, is considered an unofficial sequel of the film.

Chandralekha enhanced Rajakumari's and Ranjan's careers; both became popular throughout India after the film's release. Its climactic sword-fight scene was well received, and is considered the longest sword fight in Indian cinematic history. The drum-dance scene is considered the film's highlight, and later producers tried unsuccessfully to emulate it. Producer-director T. Rajendar said that he was inspired by the scene for a song scene budgeted at ₹10 million (US$232,296.13) in his 1999 film, Monisha En Monalisa. Film historian Firoze Rangoonwalla ranked Chandralekha's Hindi version eighth on his list of the top twenty films of Indian cinema. It was a major influence on Kamalakara Kameswara Rao's 1953 Telugu film, Chandraharam, featuring N. T. Rama Rao. On 26 August 2004, a postage stamp with Vasan and the drum dance was issued to commemorate the producer's centenary and the 35th anniversary of his death.

In July 2007, S. R. Ashok Kumar of The Hindu asked eight Tamil film directors to list their all-time favourite Tamil films; two—Mahendran and K. Balachander—named Chandralekha. Mahendran said, "If anybody tries to remake this black-and-white film, they will make a mockery of it." According to Balachander, "Just like Sivaji today, people talked about Chandralekha in the past. Produced at a cost of ₹30 lakhs ([₹3 million], a huge sum at that time), it has grand sets. I have seen it 12 times." In December 2008, Muthiah said: "Given how spectacular it was—and the appreciation lavished on it from 1948 till well into the 1950s, which is when I caught up with it—I'm sure that if re-released, it would do better at the box office than most Tamil films today." In a 2011 interview with Indo-Asian News Service (IANS), Vyjayanthimala said that although people consider that she "paved the way" for other South Indian actresses in Hindi cinema, "the person who really opened the doors was S. S. Vasan ... When [Chandralekha was] released, it took the North by storm because by then they haven't seen that kind of lavish sets, costumes and splendour. So Vasan was the person who opened the door for Hindi films in the South."

Chandralekha was K. Ramnoth's last film for Gemini Studios. Although he is often credited with shooting the drum-dance sequence, Ramnoth left the studio in August 1947, before the scene was conceived. Director Singeetam Srinivasa Rao told film critic Baradwaj Rangan that he disliked Chandralekha when he first saw it and recognised it as a classic only after 25 years, "a fact that the audiences realised in just two minutes." Film producer and writer G. Dhananjayan told The Times of India, "When you talk of black-and-white films, you cannot resist mentioning the 1948 epic Chandralekha ... That film's grandeur, be it in the sets, costumes, songs, dances and the fight sequences, still remains a benchmark even this day of colour and 3D films." In April 2012, Rediff included the film on its "A to Z of Tamil Cinema" list and said that Chandralekha "boasted an ensemble cast, great production values and a story that ensured it became a blockbuster all over India, the first of its kind."

Chandralekha has been screened at many film festivals, and was shown in December 2012 at the 10th Chennai International Film Festival (a tribute to 100 years of Indian cinema). Chandralekha was screened in April 2013 at the Centenary Film Festival, organised by India's Ministry of Information and Broadcasting and the National Film Archive. It was one of eight Indian films screened at the 28th Italian Il Cinema Ritrovato in 2014 as part of "The Golden 50s: India's Endangered Classics", the festival's first Indian-cinema retrospective. (Note: The other seven were Awaara (1951), Do Bigha Zamin (1953), Pyaasa (1957), Mother India (1957), Ajantrik (1958), Madhumati (1958) and Kaagaz Ke Phool (1959).) In his Times of India review of Baahubali: The Beginning (2015), M. Suganth wrote that director S. S. Rajamouli had "take[n] his cues [for its visuals] from varied sources" (including Chandralekha). In a November 2015 interview with Sangeetha Devi Dundoo of The Hindu, actor Kamal Haasan said: "Visual appeal has always gone hand-in-hand with content, since the days of Chandralekha and [Mayabazar], not just after Baahubali."

== Bibliography ==
- Armes, Roy (1987). Third World Film Making and the West. University of California Press. ISBN 0-520-05690-6.
- Ashokamitran (2016). Fourteen Years with Boss. India: Penguin Books. ISBN 978-0-14-342329-4.
- Banerjee, Shampa; Srivastava, Anil (1988). One Hundred Indian Feature Films: An Annotated Filmography. Routledge. ISBN 978-1-135-84098-3.
- Baskaran, S. Theodore (1996). The Eye of the Serpent: An Introduction to Tamil Cinema. East West Books. OCLC 1129458207.
- Baskaran, S. Theodore (2009). History Through the Lens: Perspectives on South Indian Cinema. Orient Blackswan. ISBN 978-8125035206.
- Blamey, David; D'Souza, Robert; Dickey, Sara (2005). Living Pictures: Perspectives on the Film Poster in India. Open Editions. ISBN 978-0-949004-15-4.
- Chander, Prakash (2003). India: Past and Present. APH Publishing. ISBN 81-7648-455-5.
- Dwyer, Rachel; Patel, Divia (2002). Cinema India: The Visual Culture of Hindi Film. Reaktion Books. ISBN 0-19-566347-0.
- Garga, B. D. (2005). Art of Cinema. Penguin Books. ISBN 978-0-670-05853-2.
- Gokulsing, K. Moti; Dissanayake, Wimal (2004). Indian Popular Cinema: A Narrative of Cultural Change. Trentham Books. ISBN 1-85856-329-1.
- Gooptu, Sharmistha (2010). Bengali Cinema: An Other Nation. Lotus Collection, Roli Books. ISBN 978-81-7436-816-4.
- Gopal, Sangita; Moorti, Sujata (2008). Global Bollywood: Travels of Hindi Song and Dance. University of Minnesota Press. ISBN 978-0-8166-4578-7.
- Gulazāra; Nihalani, Govind; Chatterjee, Saibal (2003). Encyclopaedia of Hindi Cinema. Popular Prakashan. ISBN 81-7991-066-0.
- Guy, Randor (1997). Starlight, Starbright: The Early Tamil Cinema. Chennai: Amra Publishers. OCLC 52794531.
- National Film Development Corporation of India (1998). Indian cinema: A Visual Voyage. Ministry of Information and Broadcasting. ISBN 978-8123006468.
- Pillai, Swarnavel Eswaran (2015). Madras Studios: Narrative, Genre, and Ideology in Tamil Cinema. Sage Publications. ISBN 978-93-5150-212-8.
- Raghavendra, M. K. (2009). 50 Indian Film Classics. HarperCollins. ISBN 978-81-7223-866-7.
- Rajadhyaksha, Ashish; Willemen, Paul (1998). Encyclopaedia of Indian Cinema. British Film Institute and Oxford University Press. ISBN 0-19-563579-5.
- Ranade, Ashok (2006). Hindi Film Song: Music Beyond Boundaries. Promilla & Co. ISBN 81-85002-64-9.
- Shah, Panna (1950). The Indian film. Greenwood Press. ISBN 978-0-8371-3144-3.
- Thompson, Kristin; Bordwell, David (2003). Film History – An Introduction. McGraw-Hill Education. ISBN 978-0-07-115141-2.
- Thoraval, Yves (2000). The Cinemas of India. Macmillan India. ISBN 0-333-93410-5.
- Vijayakar, Rajiv (2009). The History of Indian Film Music: A Showcase of the Very Best in Hindi Cinema. Bennett, Coleman & Company. ISBN 978-8189906818.
