= Chakra Dhari =

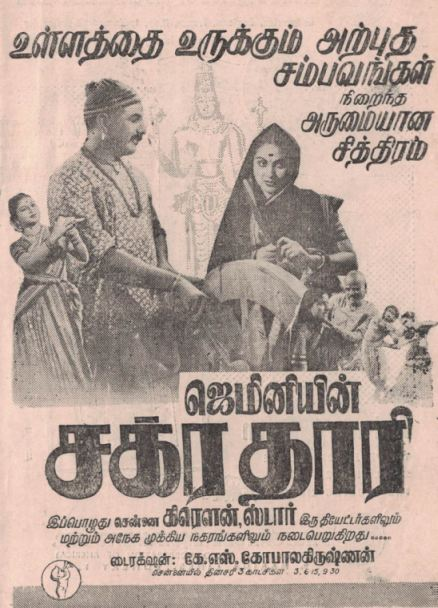
- Poster
- Directed by: K. S. Gopalakrishnan (Note: Not K. S. Gopalakrishnan)
- Story by: Gemini Story Dept.
- Based on: a story from the book titled Sri Maha Bhaktha Vijayam
- Produced by: S. S. Vasan
- Starring: Nagayya; Pushpavalli
- Cinematography: Thambu
- Edited by: N. K. Gopal
- Music by: M. D. Parthasarathy
- Production company: Gemini Studios
- Release date: 3 December 1948 (India)
- Country: India
- Language: Tamil

Chakra Dhari (transl. He who holds the wheel) is a 1948 Indian Tamil-language film produced by Gemini Studios. V. Nagayya and Pushpavalli star, while Gemini Ganesan who was a budding actor then, appears in a minor role. A year after its initial release, the film was re-released with a new partly coloured copy.

== Plot ==
Gora is a potter who lives in a village near Pandharpur in Maharashtra. He is a strong devotee of Hinduism deity Panduranga. He is not interested in earning money which worries his wife Thulasi. Venkat is Gora's elder brother and an affluent man. His wife Sona does not like Gora and his family. One day while Gora was mixing clay, his child Hari comes there, playing. Gora was in a devotional ecstasy and did not notice his child. The child is killed after being trampled under the mud. Thulasi threatens to destroy the idol of Panduranga but Gora tries to kill her with an axe. She tells Gora that he should not touch her in future and he also vows that he will not touch her. However, Thulasi gets her sister Shantha to marry her husband Gora so that they can beget a child, however, Gora refuses to touch Shantha either. The sisters seduce Gora one night. Gora is shocked and cuts off his hands for breaking his vow. Panduranga and his consort Rukmini come in disguise and help Gora. Due to their divine powers, happiness is restored to the family. Gora gets his hands back and Hari is brought back to life. The whole family becomes devotees of Panduranga.

== Cast ==
Adapted from the film credits. (See External links)

- Nagayya as Gorakumbar
- Pushpavalli as Thulasi Bai
- Suryaprabha as Shantha Bai
- Nagarcoil Mahadevan as Namadhevar
- L. Narayana Rao as Venkaji
- K. N. Kamalam as Sona
- Ganesh as Pandurangan
- Varalakshmi as Rukmani
- S. Krishnamoorthy as Penda
- Subbaiah Pillai as Sevaji
- T. V. Kalyani as Parvathi Bai
- Nandi Velayutham as Guard
- G. V. Sharma as Goldsmith
- Baba Narayanan as Mali
- N. Thyagarajan as Astrologer
- M. Ramamoorthi, V. P. S. Mani,
  N. Narasimhan, Raja Rao,
  K. T. K. S. Mani as Thieves
- Balaraman, K. Sampathkumar as Officers
- Panduranga Das, T. S. B. Rao,
  Vijaya Rao as Bhandari Devotees
- Chopra and A. Chandra as Dancers
- S. R. Lakshmi as Betel Seller
- Kumari V. Thulasi as Flower Seller
- B. Ramakrishna Rao as Bangle Seller
- Pudukottai Seenu as Areca Nut Seller
- Balan as Beggar

== Production ==
This tale has been filmed many times in many languages such as Marathi, Hindi, Kannada, Telugu and twice in Tamil.

== Soundtrack ==
Music was composed by M. D. Parthasarathy with P. S. Anantharaman as assistant. Parthasarathy also sang one or two songs. Lyrics were penned by Papanasam Sivan, Kothamangalam Subbu and Sangu Subramaniam. Singers are V. Nagayya and Nagarcoil Mahadevan. Playback singers are S. S. Mani (S. Subramanian), T. V. Rathnam, Balasaraswathi and M. Kalpagam. The song Kadhali Radhaiyai kalangavittan is set in the raga Kharaharapriya.

No.	Song	Singer/s	Lyricist	Duration (m:ss)	
1	"Vaa Vaa Ambuliye"	T. V. Rathnam	Kothamangalam Subbu	02:22	
2	"Salangai Kulunga Vaa"	M. Kalpagam	Kothamangalam Subbu	02:42 /	
3	"Ayane Mayane"	S. S. Mani	Kothamangalam Subbu	03:30	
4	"Aiyamaare Vanga Ammaamare Vanga"		Kothamangalam Subbu	07:16	
5	"Kannale Vettadhe Ennaiye"		Kothamangalam Subbu	08:43	
6	"Unakkum Enakkum"	Nagayya	Kothamangalam Subbu	03:07	
7	"Enna Ruchiyo, Aha, Enna Ruchiyo"	Nagayya	Kothamangalam Subbu		
8	"Vittalanai Panivom"	Nagayya	Kothamangalam Subbu		
9	"Kanne Thaalelo"	T. V. Rathnam	Kothamangalam Subbu		
10	"Kakkai Sirakinile"	Nagayya	Kothamangalam Subbu	Papanasam Sivan	03:21
11	"Prabhu Pandu Ranga"	Nagayya	02:47	Papanasam Sivan	
12	"Pandu Rangan Karunayale"	Nagayya	02:07	Papanasam Sivan	
13	"Bhakthiyudan Puganzhndhu Paaduvome"	Nagarcoil Mahadevan	02:03	Papanasam Sivan	
14	"Poojai Seithome"	T. V. Rathnam and group	02:29	Papanasam Sivan	
15	Musical Dance			02:31	
16	"Oradiyal Ulagalanda"	Nagayya	Sangu Subramaniam	01:40	
17	"Kadhali Radhaiyai Kalangavittan"	M. Kalpagam		02:43	

== Reception ==
The film was a success at the box-office. Film historian Randor Guy wrote in 2008 that the film is "Remembered for its soul-filling music, fine photography and Nagayya’s performance."
