= M. S. Sundari Bai =

Indian actress and singer

- Born: Madurai Saurashtra Sundari; 2 March 1923; Madurai, Madras Presidency, British India (now Tamil Nadu, India)
- Died: 12 March 2006 (aged 83); Chennai, Tamil Nadu, India
- Other name: Sundari Bai
- Occupations: Singer, dancer, actress
- Spouse: Kothamangalam Subbu (m. 1945; died 1974)

Madurai Saurashtra Sundari Bai (2 March 1923 – 12 March 2006) was an Indian actress, singer and dancer who worked mainly in Tamil cinema from the 1940s to the 1970s. Sundari Bai was the wife of writer and director Kothamangalam Subbu. Her most notable films include Aadmi (1939), Madanakamarajan (1941), Nandanar (1942), Dasi Aparanji (1944), Kannamma En Kadhali (1945), Miss Malini (1947), Chandralekha (1948), Avvaiyyar (1953), Vanjikottai Valiban (1958), Deivapiravi (1960), Padikkadha Medhai (1960) and Sila Nerangalil Sila Manithargal (1976).

== Biography ==
Sundari Bai was born in Madurai in 1923, and belonged to the Saurashtra community. A family friend persuaded her parents to send her to Bombay (now Mumbai). In the 1930s, she appeared in an advertisement film. When film producer S. S. Vasan bought Krishnaswami Subrahmanyam's MPPC Studio and renamed it Gemini Studios in 1940, Sundari Bai joined Gemini as staff artiste. She appeared in a major role in Gemini's first Tamil production Madanakamarajan (1941). She played a slum girl in Nandanar (1942), while her role as a maid in Dasi Aparanji (1944) elevated her fame. She later fell in love with Kothamangalam Subbu, another member of the Gemini staff who was a writer, actor, and director, and married him. In 1945, Sundari Bai played the lead in Kannamma En Kadhali, a World War II film written by Subbu. In 1947, Gemini produced the critically acclaimed but commercially unsuccessful Miss Malini, written and directed by her spouse Subbu, who also played the male lead. Sundari Bai acted and sang two songs in this film that became hits. Over the following decades, she went on to act in numerous films, including Chandralekha, Samsaram, Moondru Pillaigal, Avvaiyar, Valliyin Selvan, Enga Veettu Mahalakshmi, Vanjikottai Valiban, Deivapiravi, Naan Kanda Sorgam, Padikkadha Medhai, Paadhai Theriyudhu Paar and Sila Nerangalil Sila Manithargal.

== Filmography ==
- Madanakamarajan (1941)
- Bhaktha Naradar (1942)
- Nandanar (1942)
- Dasi Aparanji (1944)
- Kannamma En Kadhali (1945)
- Miss Malini (1947)
- Chandralekha (1948)
- Moondru Pillaigal (1952)
- Mr. Sampat (1952)
- Avvaiyyar (1953)
- Valliyin Selvan (1955)
- Engal Veettu Mahalakshmi (1957)
- Bommai Kalyanam (1958)
- Vanjikottai Valiban (1958)
- Paththarai Maathu Thangam (1959)
- Deivapiravi (1960)
- Naan Kanda Sorgam (1960)
- Paadhai Theriyudhu Paar (1960)
- Padikkadha Medhai (1960)
- Ellam Unakkaga (1961)
- Kumudham (1961)
- Palum Pazhamum (1961)
- Punar Janmam (1961)
- Thooya Ullam (1961)
- Manithan Maravillai (1962)
- Annai Illam (1963)
- Koduthu Vaithaval (1963)
- Panithirai (1963)
- Thulasi Maadam (1963)
- Aandavan Kattalai (1964)
- Vazhkai Vazhvatharke (1964)
- Chinnanchiru Ulagam (1966)
- Chitthi (1966)
- Motor Sundaram Pillai (1966)
- Selvam (1966)
- Engalukkum Kalam Varum (1967)
- Pesum Dheivam (1967)
- Ooty Varai Uravu (1967)
- Galatta Kalyanam (1968)
- En Thambi (1968)
- Jeevanaamsam (1968)
- Kanavan (1968)
- Panama Pasama (1968)
- Thirudan (1969)
- En Annan (1970)
- Kann Malar (1970)
- Thabalkaran Thangai (1970)
- Irulum Oliyum (1971)
- Thangaikkaaga (1971)
- Thenum Paalum (1971)
- Uttharavindri Ulle Vaa (1971)
- Pillaiyo Pillai (1972)
- Arangetram (1973) as Janaki
- Manipayal (1973)
- Pattikaattu Ponnaiya (1973)
- Ninaithadhai Mudippavan (1975)
- Sila Nerangalil Sila Manithargal (1976)
- Iraivan Kodutha Varam (1978)
- Nizhal Nijamagiradhu (1978) as Ponnamma
- Bhama Rukmani (1980)
- Mazhalai Pattalam (1980)
