= S. S. Vasan =

Indian journalist and film producer

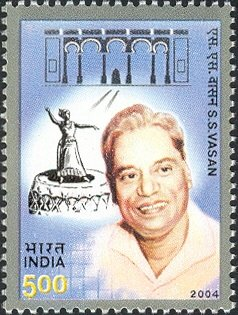
- Born: Subramaniam Srinivasan; 4 January 1904; Thiruthuraipoondi, Madras Presidency, British India
- Died: 26 August 1969 (aged 65); Madras, Tamil Nadu, India

Member of Parliament, Rajya Sabha
- In office 3 April 1964 – 26 August 1969
- Succeeded by: Kanchi Kalyanasundaram
- Constituency: Madras

Subramaniam Srinivasan (4 January 1904 – 26 August 1969), popularly known by his screen name S. S. Vasan, was an Indian journalist, writer, advertiser, film producer, director and business tycoon. He was the founder of the Tamil-language magazine Ananda Vikatan and the film production company Gemini Studios, Gemini Film Laboratories and Gemini Picture Circuit. He was a member of parliament (Rajya Sabha) from 1964 until he died in 1969.

Vasan was born in Thiruthuraipoondi in the then Thanjavur District but was forced to migrate to Madras following the death of his father at an early age. Vasan discontinued his studies before graduation and set up a flourishing mail order and advertising business.

In 1928, Vasan purchased a struggling Tamil magazine Ananda Vikatan that had been published by Budalur Vaidyanadhaiyar since February 1926 and had stopped publication in December 1927. Vasan bought the publication in January 1928 and relaunched it with the same name but in a different format from February 1928. Ananda Vikatan, subsequently, emerged as the leading Tamil magazine in the then Madras Presidency and continues to be the oldest and most respected Tamil magazine till this day.

Vasan entered the Tamil film industry in 1936 when his novel Sathi Leelavathi was made into a film.

In 1940, he purchased the Motion Picture Producers Combine, a film studio and renamed it Gemini Studios. Gemini Studios made a number of successful Tamil, Telugu and Hindi movies from 1940 to 1969, notable ones being Mangamma Sapatham, Aboorva Sagotharargal, Nandanaar, Bala Nagamma, Miss Malini, Chandralekha, Vanjikkottai Valiban, Nishaan, Mangala, Sansar, Insaniyat, Paigham, Raj Tilak, Ghunghat, Grahasti, Gharana, Zindagi, Aurat, Shatranj, Vazhkai Padagu, Motor Sundaram Pillai, Olivilakku, Chakradhari, Avvaiyar and Irumbu Thirai. Vasan also directed some of his later movies, the first being Chandralekha, which is considered by critics and film historians to be a milestone in Indian cinema. Vasan died in Madras on 26 August 1969, at the age of 65.

Vasan was an accomplished writer and translator and a hugely successful journalist. As a director, Vasan was known for his grandiose sets and innovative techniques that he introduced. Film historian Randor Guy hailed Vasan as the "Cecil B. De Mille of India".

He was the first film and media personality to be invited to be a member of parliament in India's Rajya Sabha where he advocated the granting of industry status to the film trade (a battle still being fought). He was one of the founders of Film Federation India, Producer's Guild of India and the South Indian Film Chamber of Commerce. He was awarded the Padma Bhushan in 1969, the year of his death, by the government of India for his extraordinary contribution to Indian media. The Government of India and the Postal department released postage stamps bearing his likeness on 26 August 2004, the year of his centenary.

== Early life ==
Vasan was born in the town of Thiruthuraipoondi, Thanjavur District into a brahmin family. While his official date of birth is listed as 10 March 1903, according to his family, he was born on 4 January 1904. Film historian Randor Guy suggested that Vasan's date of birth may have been deliberately fabricated to help in his school admission.

== Ananda Vikatan ==
By the late 1920s, Vasan had begun to make considerable profits and one of the magazines he advertised in (almost dominated) was a local Tamil humour magazine Ananda Bodhini with a circulation of about 2000. During this period, Vasan wrote a number of short stories for the Tamil magazines he brought advertisements for, with mixed success. He also translated popular English fiction and ran a successful mail order business.

In 1926, Budalur Vaidyanadhaiyar founded the Tamil satirical monthly Ananda Vikatan, but the publication soon ran into severe financial distress and subscription dropouts. In January 1928, advertising agent S.S. Vasan—who had paid for an unprinted advertisement—stepped in and bought the magazine's rights for Rs 200 (calculated at Rs 25 per Tamil alphabet). Vasan relocated the office, upgraded equipment, halved the subscription price, converted it into a weekly magazine, and boosted sales by introducing engaging interactive puzzles with prizes. Vasan followed a rigorous marketing strategy which eventually saw the emergence of Ananda Vikatan as the best selling Tamil magazine of the time. with a readership touching 30,000 within a few months and growing to hundreds of thousands of readers in the following decades. In 1933, he started a humour magazine in English called The Merry Magazine and in 1934, a Tamil weekly called Naradhar devoted to arts, politics, literature and social issues, both of which were successful. In 1934, Ananda Vikatan became the first Tamil magazine to advertise in the British periodicals Advertiser's Review and Advertiser's Weekly. A key to Vasan's success was his ability to find and nurture talent and one of the biggest breaks came in the early 1930s when Vasan found a new writer Kalki Krishnamurthy in whose writing he saw great potential. Kalki was living at the time with his family in Mayiladuthurai and Vasan without having met him in person unhesitatingly sent him money and tickets to move to Madras with his family and take up the role of the editor of his new magazine. Kalki and Vasan created history in the decade or so where they were professionally aligned and remained close friends for life. Another part of this successful team was Kalki Sadasivam who was a dynamic ad-man and was able to follow through Vasan's vision for marketing strategy. Sadasivam was also the legendary M.S. Subbulakshmi's husband. MS and Mrs Vasan were extremely close friends till the end of their days. Ananda Vikatan remained the foremost Tamil magazine without serious competition until 1941, when the editor Kalki Krishnamurthy and the dynamic marketing manager Kalki Sadasivam left the Ananda Vikatan to participate in the freedom struggle and hence got imprisoned. They then started the Kalki.

Ananda Vikatan, a part of the Vikatan group today continues to be one of the leading names in Tamil households and celebrates 97 years of publishing being the oldest vernacular magazine in the country. It now encompasses seven print magazines under its umbrella and has been the starting point of many major writers, artists and media personalities in South India.

== Movies ==
In 1936, Vasan's Tamil novel Sathi Leelavathi was made into a film by Manorama Films. Two years later, he became a film distributor when he obtained the distribution rights for films made by the Madras United Artists' Association. He was the financier-distributor of the film Thyagabhoomi in 1939 that set new trends in various arenas. Thyagabhoomi was a serial novel written by Kalki in Ananda Vikatan while simultaneously being made as a film by noted film producer K Subrahmanyam who was also a close friend. Causing ripples and becoming a huge success, it was subsequently banned by the then British government for its strong theme of the Indian freedom movement in addition to other social issues. The film was a milestone in the annals of Tamil film history in many fronts.

When a fire broke out in 1940 on the premises of the Motion Picture Producers Combine, a prominent film studio owned by K Subrahmanyam, damaging it completely, Vasan purchased the studio, rebuilt and renamed it as the Gemini Studios. It is purported that the name was chosen because Vasan was an extremely successful punter, involved in horse racing at that time and owned a successful race horse named Gemini Star. However, his family cite the reason to choose "Gemini" as it was the natal moon sign of Vasan's wife Pattamal, who was not only his strongest supporter but who brought his family great luck. An interesting point of note was that the "model" for the Gemini twins logo was inspired on the day the name was coined when Vasan was visiting his friend K Subrahmanyam and his toddler son Balakrishnan ran out in his underwear and stood holding a bugle.

That very year, Gemini Studios produced its first movie, Madanakamarajan, which was a box-office success. Vasan followed it with Mangamma Sapatham and Miss Malini both of which were successful. Miss Malini, based on the story Mr. Sampath by R. K. Narayan, launched the career of Gemini Ganesan, who later became a leading actor in the Tamil film industry. The Hindi version of this film was Mr Sampath in Hindi and, these films are the only adaptation of his novels that the famous writer R. K. Narayan was involved in the scripting of the screenplay. Mangamma Sabatham launched Vasundhara Devi, the mother of actor-politician Vyjayanthimala Bali as the lead and created a craze making her a huge star in just one film. The picture was directed by Acharya, one of the early brilliants of Tamil cinema. In 1942, Gemini also made Bala Nagamma, a silver jubilee hit in Telugu based on a popular folk tale which captured the imaginations of the audience and was hugely successful. It was the last film to star Kanchanamala and was an important film in the career of Pushpavalli. Bala Nagamma was later adapted into Hindi with Madhubala playing the lead and Savitri making her Hindi debut as Bahut Din Huwe with the addition of the climax borrowed from another Gemini Film, Avvaiyar which used elephants to the rescue. This was especially hugely successful in Maharashtra with their devotion to Lord Ganesha. Other successes during the period leading to independence included comedy capers like Kannama En Kadhali, Daasi Aparanji – a period social satire and Apoorva Sagotharargal, an adaptation of the story of the Corsican Brothers – a tale of co-joined twins separated at birth. It was one of the first films in India and one of the first few in the world that had a double role for the lead M. K. Radha who played both brothers. It also set the trend for innumerable successful films in India that had siblings, especially look-alike ones that were separated at birth and grew up in two different circumstances a la Prince and the Pauper or Man in the Iron Mask only to be switched or join forces to exact revenge. The actor-politician, M. G. Ramachandran picked this film to remake as "Neerum Neruppum" as a tribute and homage to Vasan in 1971 and earlier in 1968 had done his 100th film Oli Vilakku, particular that it be a Gemini production. Another successful film in this period, a devotional Nandanaar was a controversial story of a harijan man overcoming the shackles of the caste oppression to gain admittance into the Chidambaram Nataraja temple with divine sanction, hence becoming a Nayanmar shaivite saint. This starred the famous singer Dandapani Desikar with the film and soundtrack becoming a runaway superhit in Tamil Nadu. Technically, it was the first film in India that used playback singing in a portion where a divine song, a call to the saint in a heavenly voice rings out of the ether – this of course set a trend for playback singers and revolutionised the necessity to use singer-actors for films that had been the norm through the 1930s and early 1940s.

Vasan's involvement in films eventually led him to direct his first movie, Chandralekha. He was really preparing his big post-independence break. The 1948 Tamil Chennai film industry classic Chandralekha was rereleased in Hindi and Tamil. While the film was original begun under the direction of Acharya who had earlier directed landmark Gemini films like Mangamma Sabatham, differences of opinion between Vasan and Acharya led to the director stepping down from the film. Vasan then donned the role of director in addition to being the producer of the epic movie. The film, a spectacle, is remembered for its drum dance and extensive sword fight sequence. 603 prints of Chandralekha were made and the film was even released in the United States as Chandra with English subtitles – the first Indian film to do so! Even now, a print exists in the Library of Congress as representative of classic Indian cinema. Vasan encouraged his dear friend Tarachand Barjatya to found Rajshri Pictures in 1947 and assigned him the distribution of Chandralekha in the North, the first project distributed by Rajshri and one of the biggest successes of its time thus spurring off the growth stories of one of the biggest distributors and producers of Indian cinema today.

Released in 1948, after five years in production, the film became a highly acclaimed film of the period. It had the first drum-dance and the longest sword-fight sequence captured on film in the world. It was the costliest Indian film made until then and was the first major Indian film to be dubbed into English and released internationally. Made for a budget of Rs 3.6 million in 1948, the budget adjusted for inflation (equaling approximately Rs 1.62 billion today) makes it one of the most expensive films ever made for half a century in India. The Hindi version of the film was one of the first South Indian productions that found all India success and can be hailed as one of the first pan-Indian major blockbuster. Following the success of Chandralekha, Gemini Studios made several films in Hindi that include Insaniyat, Aurat, Paigham, Gharana, Grahasti, Ghoongat, Zindagi, Mr Sampat, Sansar, Lakhon Mein Ek, Raj Tilak, Nishan, Mangala, Bahut Din Hue, Teen Bahuraniyan and Shatranj that all found Box office success. Insaniyat was one of the only films to star both Dilip Kumar and Dev Anand and Gemini films first begun the practice of making popular ensemble cast films with multiple leading men. Although films have been made by Gemini and Vasan with almost all the top leading heroes of the time including Raaj Kumar, Rajendra Kumar, Manoj Kumar, Ashok Kumar, Dilip Kumar and Dev Anand, there was no picture that Gemini made with Raj Kapoor while there were two that had Prithviraj Kapoor making a comeback in strong supporting roles in Teen Bahuraniyan and Zindagi. Aurat had one of Rajesh Khanna's first major on-screen roles before he got his major break as a leading man. Similarly, Amitabh Bachchan got his opportunity to become introduced as the male lead man opposite Mala Sinha in a Gemini production (produced and directed by S.S. Balan, Vasan's son), Sanjog shortly after Saat Hindustani and just before his success with Zanjeer. Many technicians, writers, directors, producers and artistes across India were introduced into the media world by Gemini and even personally encouraged or mentored by Vasan and later by his son Balan. In the 1950s Gemini Pictures came out with films both in Tamil and Hindi in addition to Telugu and other regional languages. Popular Hindi films include Mr. Sampat (1952), Insaniyat (1955), Raj Tilak (1958) and Paigham (1959).

In 1958, he established Gemini Colour Laboratories and believed in establishing the Film Trade on professional lines. His vision saw establish one of the first media conglomerates in the world that were vertically aligned that included the Gemini Picture Circuit – one of the largest film distributors in the country that saw a variety of Indian and foreign films release under its umbrella across the nation. He noted that success of a film depended on its distribution and found its validation with the success of the GPC. The Gemini Studios was also the location of choice for various film shootings across the country and also boasted of having the first air-condition floors in addition to the largest sound stages in Asia at the time. Some famous and milestone films shot at Gemini studios include Uday Shankar's Kalpana, a dance and visual extravaganza that was being made simultaneously with Chandralekha and in fact inspired the drum dance sequence. Meticulously organised, Gemini Studios ran like a factory churning out successful films in multiple languages for 30 years under his dynamic vision. The distribution network was spread across South Asia and even had trade links with Hollywood, London and Russia. Additionally, the ownership and popularity of the magazine Ananda Vikatan under his aegis completed the vertical alignment of the media empire. Major films in Tamil include Avvaiyyar (1952) on the life of the poet-saint that was directed and produced by Vasan at lavish cost and that found everlasting success starring K. B. Sundarambal who was persuaded to act in the film (as she had been widowed a few years earlier) for a whopping sum or Rs 100,000 rupees which was the highest ever fee for an actor in India at the time. Other extremely successful Tamil films produced and some directed by him include Mangamma Sabatham, Vazhkai Padagu, Nandanaar, Motor Sundaram Pillai, "Oli Vilakku", Chakradhari, Aboorva Sagotharargal, Vanji Kottai Valipan, Irumbu Thirai.

Vasan was the President of the Film Federation of India for two terms, helping found it and was even nominated to the Rajya Sabha (the first film producer to be an MP of the Rajya Sabha). He also helped found the South Indian Film Chamber. He pushed for extensive reforms of the film trade, gave up cash transactions in film financing as early as the 1950s and was one of the first pioneers to ask for industry status. He was the given the Padma Bhushan by the Govt. of India in 1969, the year of his death. His son S. S. Balan was mentored by him, and ran the flourishing Gemini Studios and Vasan Publications (Ananda Vikatan) till the concept of movie studios themselves were threatened in the 1970s. Balan had been a successful director promoting independent cinema and having written as well as directed successful movies prior to the 1970s. However, an expensive production in 4 languages (Tamil, Telugu, Hindi and Kannada) in the mid 1970s that failed to make its mark at the box office dealt a fatal blow to the studios that were then sold in the 1980s. The Gemini banner now continues to be owned by the L. V. Prasad family of Prasad Studios. Balan continued as editor and managing director of Ananda Vikatan and launched the first Tamil investigative journal, Junior Vikatan, which became very successful till 2006, and he is now Chairman of the Vikatan Group. At the time in the media and film world, especially since many had come from the mentorship of either Gemini or Vikatan, everyone used to address Mr Vasan, "Boss" (including his own son) and that is how he was universally referred to – indicating his power and the respect he inspired.

Gemini Pictures declined in the 1970s although it has remained successful as a studio and equipment rental business though no longer held by his family. Ananda Vikatan under Vasan Publications has branched off into being one of the largest media groups in Tamil Nadu and continues to be privately held within family.

== Legacy ==
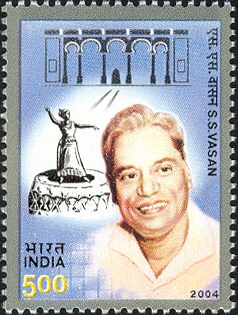
Vasan on 2004 stamp of India

Vasan believed that films were meant to entertain and were meant to be catered to the ordinary man. Colossal production values, huge sets, mammoth dances, thousands of extras were his hallmark. It can be said that a direct development of the use of song, dance and pageantry in film became almost a hallmark of Indian/Bollywood cinema and gave rise to the Madras formula of success. In more recent decades, this unfortunately overshadowed all the other cinematic values to have become almost the blueprint for formula films of India. Gemini was also the first to pioneer innovative marketing and PR plans for the release of films including the first to use the concept of giant 'cut-outs' and billboards beginning with Chandralekha. A vast number of reigning film and media professionals came out from the mentorship or employment of Gemini Studios.

Lavishness in production, splashing money in promoting, packaging and publicising a picture, he was a pioneer in Indian Cinema and had no equals, then, and now. 'Be wise and advertise!' He had a character speak in his film "Miss. Malini" (1947), giving expression to one of his personal beliefs. And he showed what one could achieve with punch-plus publicity.

— - Film historian Randor Guy on S.S. Vasan

== Filmography ==
Selected and available filmography has been listed.

=== As director ===
Year	Film	Language	Cast	Notes
1948	Chandralekha	Tamil	Ranjan, T. R. Rajakumari, N. S. Krishnan, Maduram	A superhit which revolutionised Tamil cinema. Vasan's first directorial venture.
1948	Chandralekha	Hindi	Ranjan, T. R. Rajakumari, M. K. Radha	Bollywood version of S. S. Vasan's Tamil film Chandralekha. Vasan's first directorial venture in Hindi
1949	Nishan	Hindi	Bhanumathi, J. S. Casshyap, Ranjan, R. Nagendra Rao, M. K. Radha	
1950	Mangala	Telugu	Ranjan, Bhanumathi	
1950	Mangala	Hindi	Ranjan, Bhanumathi	Remake of Mangamma Sapatham
1951	Samsaram	Tamil	M. K. Radha, Pushpavalli, Swaraj, Vanaja	
1951	Sansar	Hindi	M. K. Radha, Pushpavalli, Swaraj, Vanaja	
1952	Mr. Sampat	Hindi	Motilal, Padmini, Kanhaiyalal, Swaraj, Vanaja and Agha	Film version of R. K. Narayan's novel
1954	Bahut Din Huwe	Hindi	Madhubala, Swaraj	
1955	Insaniyat	Hindi	Dilip Kumar, Dev Anand, Bina Rai, Jayant	Remake of 1950 Telugu hit film Palletoori Pilla
1958	Vanjikkottai Valiban	Tamil	Gemini Ganesan, Vyjayanthimala, Padmini, P.S. Veerappa	
1958	Raj Tilak	Hindi	Gemini Ganeshan, Padmini, Vyjayanthimala, Pran	Remake of Vanjikkottai Valiban
1959	Paigham	Hindi	Dilip Kumar, Vyjayanthimala, Raaj Kumar, B. Saroja Devi, Motilal, Johnny Walker, Pandari Bai, Vasundhara Devi	
1960	Irumbu Thirai	Tamil	Sivaji Ganesan, Vyjayanthimala, B. Saroja Devi, K. A. Thangavelu, S. V. Ranga Rao, Pandari Bai, Vasundhara Devi	Remake of Paigham
1961	Gharana	Hindi	Rajendra Kumar, Raaj Kumar and Asha Parekh	
1967	Aurat	Hindi	Padmini, Feroz Khan, Rajesh Khanna, Pran, Kanhaiyalal, David, O P Ralhan, Nazima, Lalita Pawar and Leela Chitnis	
1968	Teen Bahuraniyan	Hindi	Prithviraj Kapoor, Kanchana, Sowcar Janaki, Jayanthi	
1969	Shatranj	Hindi	Rajendra Kumar, Waheeda Rehman, Mehmood	

=== As producer ===
Year	Film	Language	Cast	Director	Notes
1941	Madanakamarajan	Tamil	V. V. Satakopan, K. L. V. Vasantha	B. N. Rao	Vasan's first film as producer, but not officially produced by Gemini. It was advertised as "Produced for Dindugal Amirtham Talkies at Gemini Studios".
1942	Nandanar (1942 film)	Tamil	Dandapani Desikar, Kothamangalam Subbu, Serukalathur Sama	Murugadasa	A controversial bhakti film playing the life of harijan saint Nandanar and immense hit.
1942	Bala Nagamma	Telugu	Kanchanamala, Pushpavalli, Dr. Govindarajula Subbarao	Chittajulla Pullaya	A cult silver jubilee film made based on a folk legend.
1943	Mangamma Sapatham	Tamil	Ranjan, Vasundhara Devi, N. S. Krishnan	T. G. Raghavanchari	First "colossal" hit of South Indian cinema, Vasan's first, which made him one of the biggest names in Tamil cinema
1944	Dasi Aparanji	Tamil	Pushpavalli, M. K. Radha, Kothamangalam Subbu, M. S. Sundari Bai	A cult hit	
1945	Kannamma En Kadhali	Tamil	M. K. Radha, Sundari Bai	Kothamangalam Subbu	Coming at the height of the Second World War, this was in support of Britain's war effort.
1947	Miss Malini	Tamil	Pushpavalli, Kothamangalam Subbu, V. Gopalakrishnan, Gemini Ganesan	Kothamangalam Subbu	Gemini Ganesan's first hit film
1948	Chandralekha	Tamil	Ranjan, T.R.Rajakumari, M.K.Radha, N.S.Krishnan, T.A.Maduram	S.S.Vasan	A milestone in Tamil cinema. The film was another colossal hit of Vasan's and was known for its colossal sets and the unforgettable drum-dance.
1948	Chandralekha	Hindi	Ranjan, T.R.Rajakumari, M. K. Radha	S. S.Vasan	Hindi version of Tamil film 'Chandralekha'. S.S.Vasan's first Bollywood production
1948	Chakradhari	Tamil	V. Nagayya, Pushpavalli, Surya Prabha, Gemini Ganeshan	K. S. Gopalakrishnan	Story of a Krishna devotee. Successful film
1949	Apoorva Sahodarargal	Tamil	M. K. Radha, P. Bhanumathi, R. Nagendra Rao	'Acharya' T.D. Raghavacharyal	
1949	Nishan	Hindi	Ranjan, P. Bhanumathi, R. Nagendra Rao	S. S.Vasan	Hindi Version of Apoorva Sahodarargal
1951	Mangala	Hindi	Ranjan, Bhanumathi		
1951	Mangala	Telugu	Ranjan, Bhanumathi		
1951	Samsaram	Tamil	M. K. Radha, Pushpavalli, Kumari Vanaja, Sriram, T. R. Ramachandran	Chandru	
1951	Sansar	Hindi	M. K. Radha, Pushpavalli, Vanaja, Swaraj, Agha	S. S. Vasan	Hindi Version of Samsaram
1952	Mr. Sampath	Hindi	Motilal, Padmini, Kanhaiyalal, Swaraj, Vanaja and Agha	S.S.Vasan	Film version of R. K. Narayan's novel
1952	Moondru Pillaigal	Tamil	M. K. Radha, R. Nagendra Rao, P. Kannamba, Gemini Ganesan	R. Nagendra Rao	
1953	Avvaiyar	Tamil	Gemini Ganesan, K. B. Sundarambal	Kothamangalam Subbu	A classic. The story of Tamil saint Avvaiyar, the film was known for its wonderful songs.
1954	Rajee En Kanmani	Tamil	T. R. Ramachandran, Sriranjani Jr., S. V. Ranga Rao	K. J. Mahadevan	An adaptation of the Charlie Chaplin classic City Lights
1954	Raji Naa Pranam	Telugu	T. R. Ramachandran, Sriranjani Jr., S. V. Ranga Rao	K. J. Mahadevan	
1954	Bahut Din Huye	Hindi	Madhubala, Savitri Kommareddy	S.S.Vasan	
1955	Insaniyat	Hindi	Dilip Kumar, Dev Anand, Bina Rai, Jayant and Shobhana Samarth	S.S.Vasan	
1958	Vanjikkottai Valiban	Tamil	Gemini Ganesan, Vyjayanthimala, Padmini, P.S. Veerappa	S. S. Vasan	
1958	Raj Tilak	Hindi	Gemini Ganesan, Vyjayanthimala, Padmini, Pran	S. S. Vasan	Remake of Vanjikkottai Valiban
1959	Paigham	Hindi	Dilip Kumar, Vyjayanthimala, Raaj Kumar, B. Saroja Devi, Motilal, Johnny Walker, Pandari Bai, Vasundhara Devi	S. S. Vasan	
1960	Irumbu Thirai	Tamil	Sivaji Ganesan, Vyjayanthimala, B. Saroja Devi, K. A. Thangavelu, S. V. Ranga Rao, Pandari Bai, Vasundhara Devi	S. S. Vasan	Remake of Paigham
1960	Ghunghat	Hindi	Bharat Bhushan, Leela Chitnis, Pradeep Kumar, Bina Rai, Asha Parekh, Helen, Rajendranath, Rehman (actor) and Agha	Ramanand Sagar	
1961	Gharana	Hindi	Rajendra Kumar, Raaj Kumar and Asha Parekh	S.S. Vasan	
1963	Grahasti	Hindi	Bipin Gupta, Rajshree, Iftekhar, Gajanan Jagirdar, Kanhaiyalal, Shubha Khote, Manmohan Krishna, Ashok Kumar, Manoj Kumar, Sudesh Kumar, Bharati Malwankar, Mehmood, Indrani Mukherjee	Kishore Sahu	
1964	Zindagi	Hindi	Vyjayanthimala, Rajendra Kumar	Ramanand Sagar	
1965	Vaazhkai Padagu	Tamil	Gemini Ganesan, Deivka, S. V. Ranga Rao, K. Balaji, R. Muthuraman, R. S. Manohar, M. V. Rajamma	C. Srinivasan	
1967	Aurat	Hindi	Rajesh Khanna, Feroz Khan, Pran, Padmini, Kanhaiyalal, David, O P Ralhan, Nazima, Lalita Pawar and Leela Chitnis	S.S.Balan & S.S.Vasan	
1968	Teen Bahuraniyan	Hindi	Prithviraj Kapoor, Agha, Kanchana, Sowcar Janaki, Jayanthi	S.S.Vasan	
1968	Oli vilakku	Tamil	M.G.Ramachandran, J.Jayalalithaa, Sowcar Janaki		
1969	Shatranj	Hindi	Rajendra Kumar, Waheeda Rehman, Mehmood	S.S.Vasan	
