= M. D. Parthasarathy =

Indian music composer and actor (1910–1963)

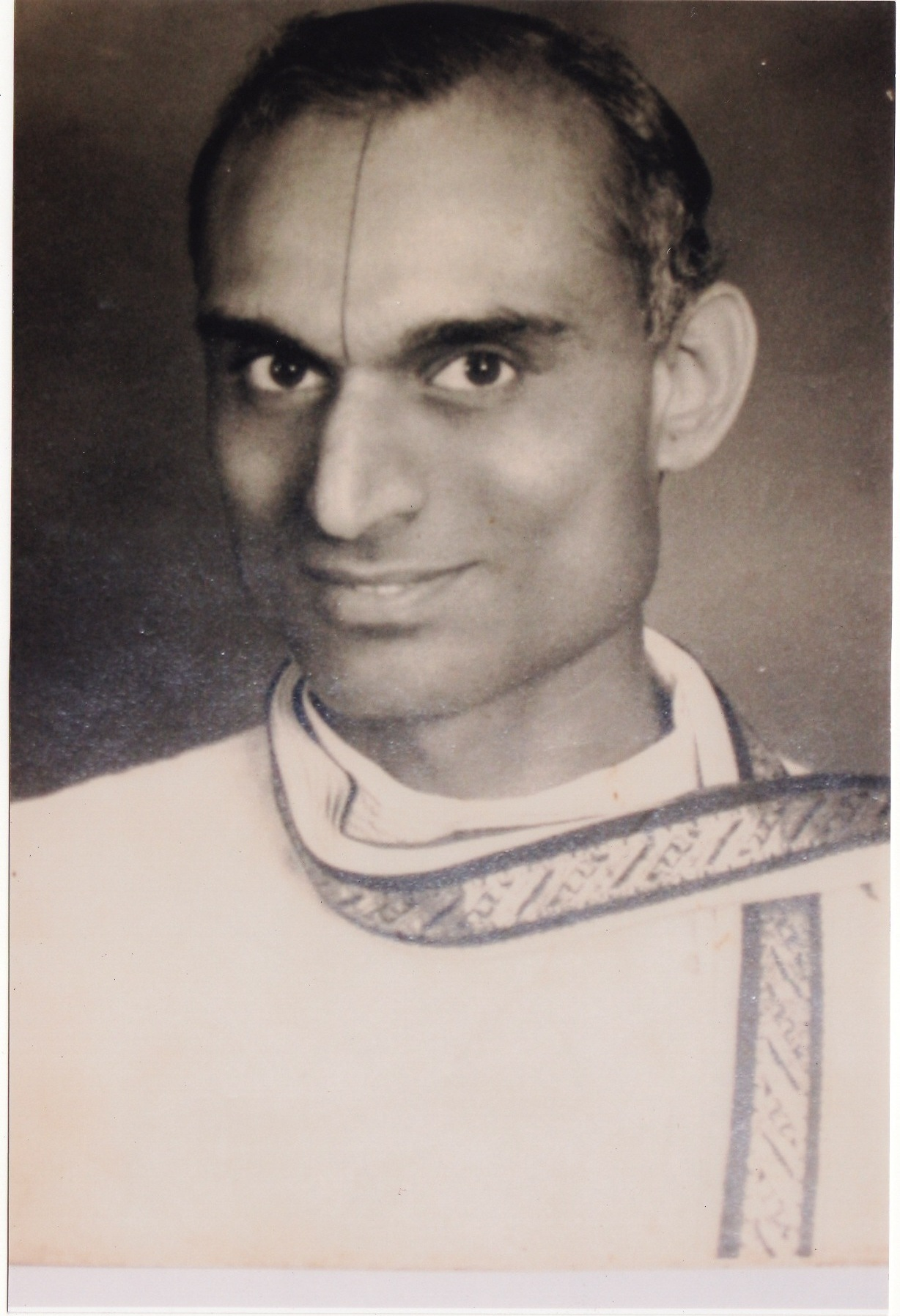
M.D. Parthasarathy

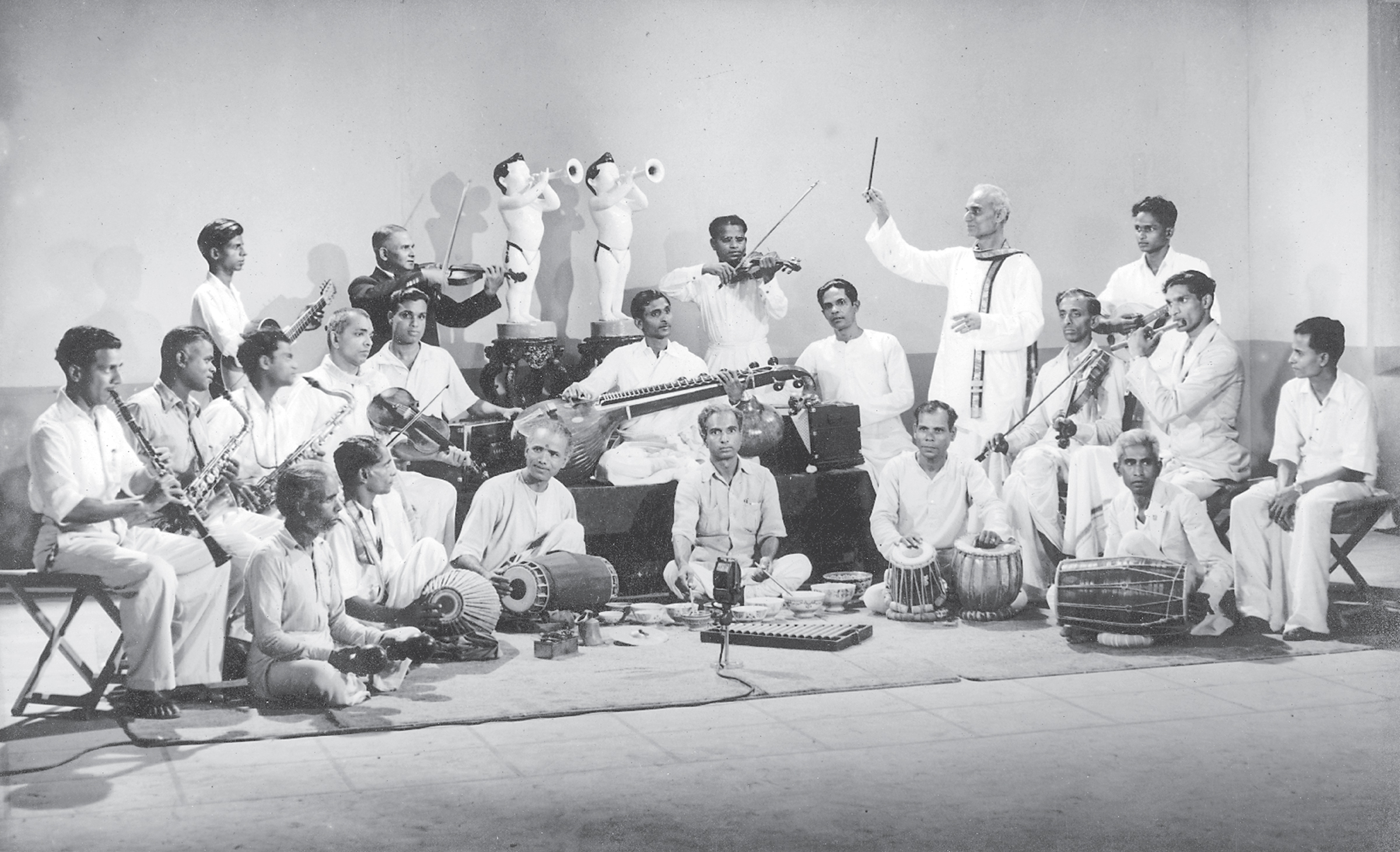
M.D. Parthasarahty

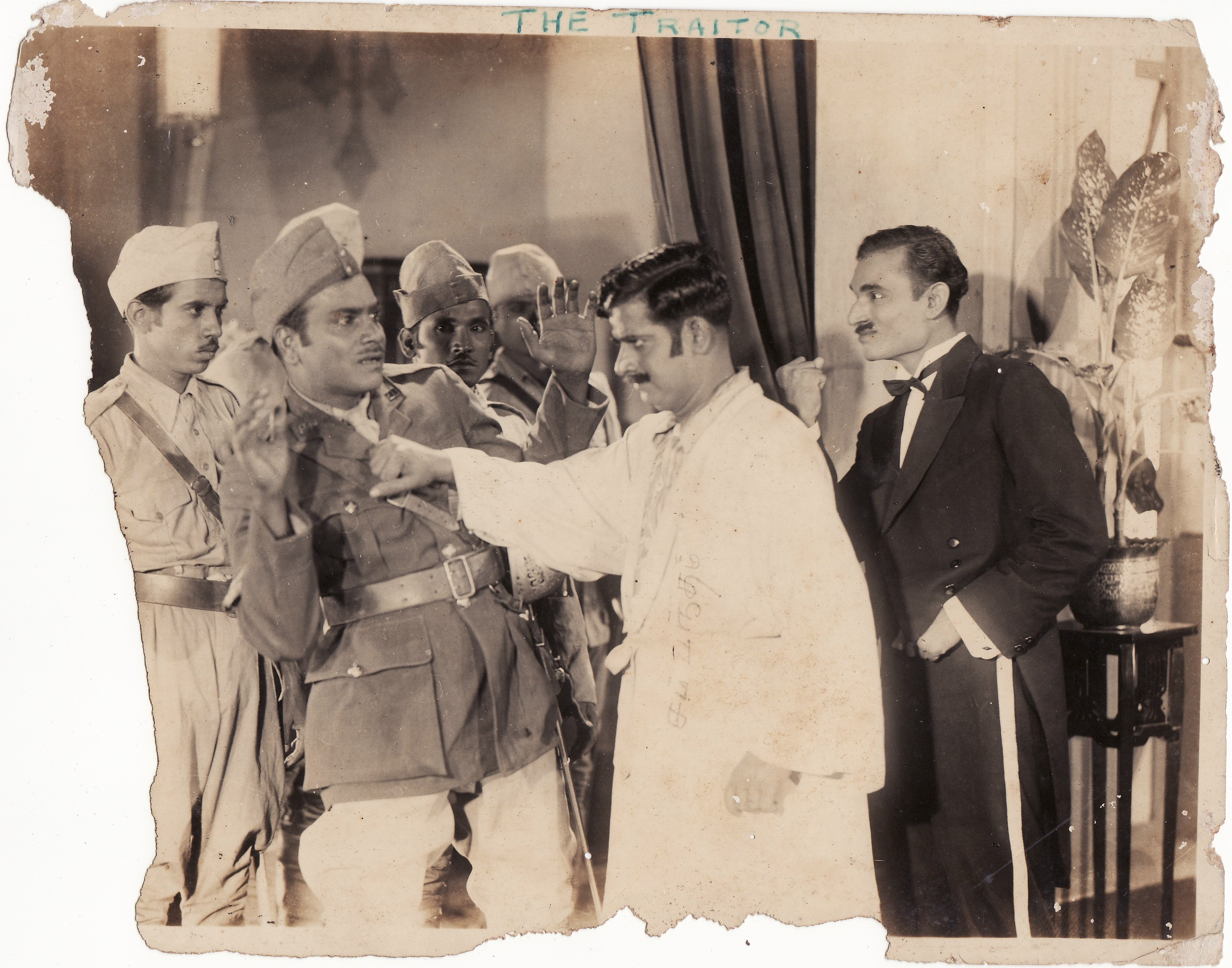
M.D. Parthasarathy

M. D. Parthasarathy (21 September 1910 – August 1963) was an Indian music composer and actor, who worked mainly in Tamil cinema.

== Musician ==
Parthasarathy was a "Sangeetha Bhushanam" of Annamalai University. During his period at this university veterans like Ponniah Pillai (of the Thanjavur quartet family) and violinist and Sangeetha Kalanidhi T.S. Sabesa Iyer taught there. After completing his course in the early 1930s, Parthasarathy went to Madras (now Chennai). It was the time the Tamil talkie began to flourish. Most of the talkies were produced with stories from the mythological epics. The actors came from the stage and from the Carnatic music world. Parthasarathy who was well trained in Carnatic music found a place easily in talkies.

== Actor ==
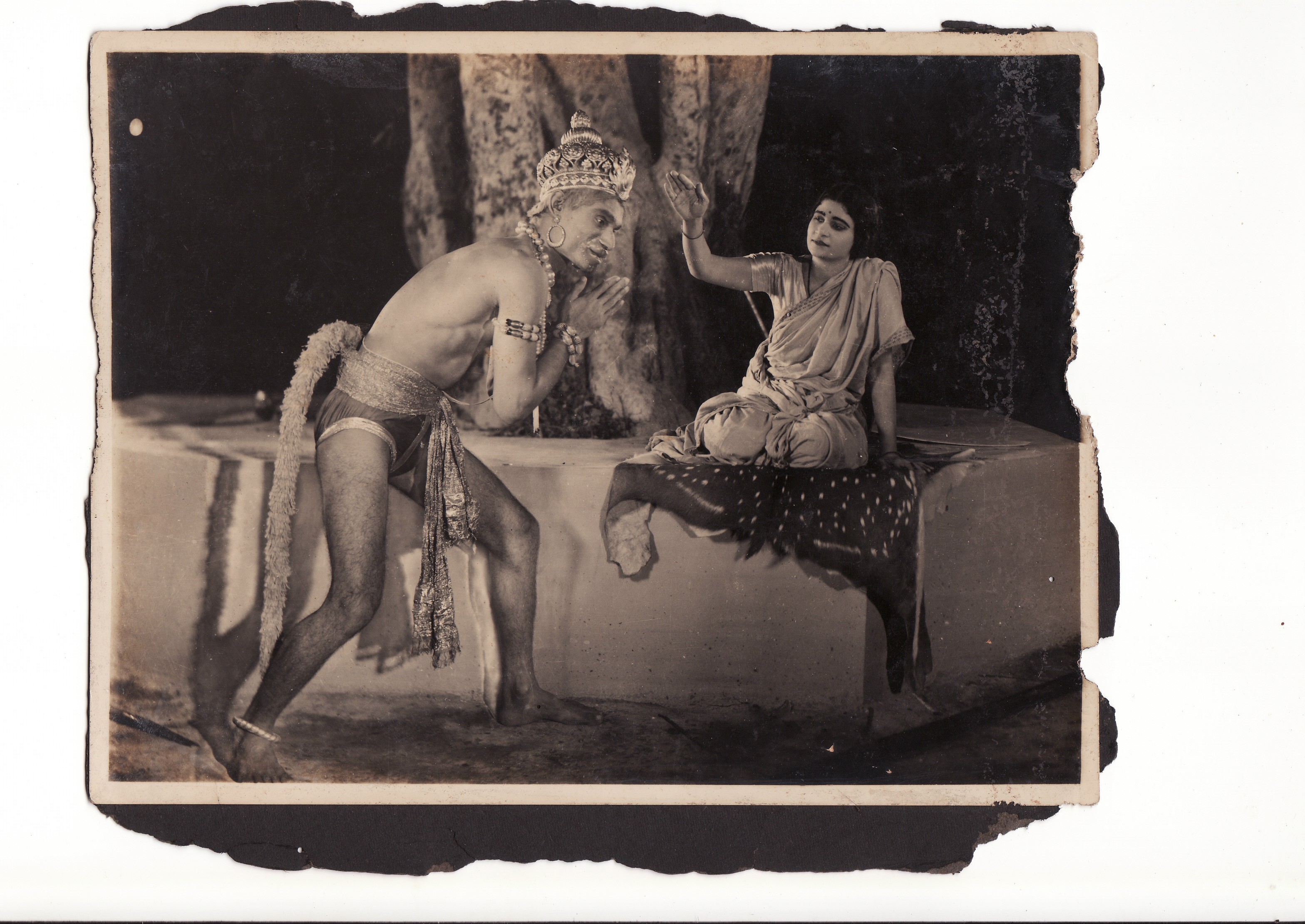
MDP as Hanuman in the film Garuda Garva Bhangam (1938)

Prominent stage actor and writer Vadivel Naicker spotted Parthasarathy when he was acting in a play of the amateur group of the veteran stage drama producer Pammal Sambandha Mudaliar. This led to Parthasarathy playing roles in films like Sakkubai (1934), Draupadi Vastrapaharanam (1934) and Srinivasa Kalyanam (this is the first Tamil film to be wholly made in Madras). But he is said to have come into his own with his interpretation of Hanuman in the film Garuda Garva Bhangam (1936).

== Radio stint ==
Just when his cinematic career seemed to have hit a dead-end, Parthasarathy found work with Tiruchi Radio as a staff artiste. He is said to have been very popular as an actor in radio plays.

Later, after leaving the film industry for good, Parthasarathy joined AIR Bangalore

== Music director ==
After a few years in radio, the film world beckoned him again. It was S. S. Vasan calling him to be in-house music director for the Gemini banner which would become a household name in a few years.

== Death ==
Parthasarathy died in August 1963 due to cancer.

== Filmography ==
=== As actor ===
- Sakkubai (1934)
- Srinivasa Kalyanam (1934)
- Garuda Garvabhangham (1936)
- Sethu Bandhanam (1937)
- Dharmapuri Rahasiyam (alias Rajadrohi)

=== As music composer ===
Year	Film	Language	Director	Banner	Notes
1941	Madana Kama Rajan	Tamil	B. N. Rao	Gemini Studios	with S. Rajeswara Rao
1942	Bala Nagamma	Telugu	C. Pullaiah	Gemini Studios	with S. Rajeswara Rao
1942	Nandanar	Tamil	Murugadasa	Gemini Studios	with S. Rajeswara Rao
1943	Mangamma Sabatham	Tamil	Acharya	Gemini Studios	with S. Rajeswara Rao
1944	Dasi Aparanji	Tamil	B. N. Rao	Gemini Studios	with S. Rajeswara Rao
1945	Kannamma En Kadhali	Tamil	Kothamangalam Subbu	Gemini Studios	
1948	Chandralekha	Hindi	S. S. Vasan	Gemini Studios	with S. Rajeswara Rao
1948	Chandralekha	Tamil	S. S. Vasan	Gemini Studios	with S. Rajeswara Rao
1948	Gnana Soundari	Tamil	Murugadasa	Gemini Studios	
1949	Apoorva Sagodharargal	Tamil	Acharya	Gemini Studios	with S. Rajeswara Rao & R. Vaidyanathan
1949	Nishaan	Hindi	Acharya	Gemini Studios	with S. Rajeswara Rao & R. Vaidyanathan
1950	Apoorva Sahodarulu	Telugu	Acharya	Gemini Studios	with S. Rajeswara Rao & R. Vaidyanathan
1953	Avvaiyar	Tamil	Kothamangalam Subbu	Gemini Studios	P. S. Anandaraman & Mayavaram Venu
1955	Nam Kuzhandai	Tamil	K. S. Gopalakrishnan	Windsor Productions	
