= Rajee En Kanmani =

1954 film directed by K. J. Mahadevan

- Theatrical release poster
- Directed by: K. J. Mahadevan
- Written by: Sangu Subramaniam (dialogues)
- Screenplay by: K. J. Mahadevan
- Story by: K. J. Mahadevan
- Based on: City Lights by Charlie Chaplin
- Produced by: S. S. Vasan
- Starring: T. R. Ramachandran; Sriranjani
- Cinematography: C. A. S. Mani
- Edited by: M. Umanatha Rao
- Music by: S. Hanumantha Rao
- Production company: Gemini Studios
- Release date: 29 January 1954
- Country: India
- Language: Tamil

Rajee En Kanmani (English: Rajee, my darling) is a 1954 Indian Tamil-language romantic drama film directed by K. J. Mahadevan and produced by S. S. Vasan. The film stars T. R. Ramachandran and Sriranjani Jr. A remake of Charlie Chaplin's City Lights (1931), it was remade in Telugu as Rajee Naa Pranam the same year.

== Plot ==
Ramu is a homeless orphan. He saves a blind flower-seller girl, Rajee, from a car accident. Ramu takes pity on her and helps her sell flowers, as love develops between them. Ramu happens to know an eye specialist, whom he takes Rajee to for consultation. The doctor says her eyesight could be restored, but it will cost 1,000 rupees, a princely sum in those days. To earn money for the procedure, Ramu accepts a challenge from a boxing stalwart and wins the prize money. However, two crooks rob Ramu of the money soon after his win. Then, Ramu helps a drunken rich businessman, who gives the money to Ramu as a present. After Ramu pays the doctor, he is arrested by the police on a false charge of theft and sent to prison.

In the meantime, the doctor performs the surgery, and Rajee regains eyesight. She is longing to see Ramu, but she has not heard any news about him. Ramu tries to escape from the prison and gets caught, causing his sentence to be extended. Rajee's aunt, who was her only support, dies. The house owner makes advances on the helpless Rajee, distressing her so much that she decides to end her life by drowning herself in the sea. In the nick of time, an unknown woman saves her. She finds out the woman is none other than the doctor's mother, who takes Rajee home and agrees to let her begin working as a nurse for the doctor.

The doctor starts falling in love with Rajee, but her mind is filled with Ramu. Another woman, Roopa, has a one-sided love with the doctor. She finds the doctor is interested in Rajee and precipitates matters. The doctor opens his heart to Rajee, causing her to feel torn between love and gratitude. She decides to leave the doctor's place, but the mother intercepts and pleads with Rajee to marry her son for the sake of his happiness. Rajee marries the doctor and bears a son, whom she names Ramu.

Eventually, Ramu is released from prison, and he comes to the doctor's place to find out whether Rajee got her eyesight back. When he comes to the doctor's house, Rajee is at the threshold, looking at Ramu. Because he now looks like a beggar, she does not recognize him. When their eyes meet, the events of the day make him realize that her love for him has not diminished over the years. Rajee presents him a flower, which he accepts and fades out of her life with joy, without identifying himself to her.

== Cast ==
Cast according to the opening credits of the film and song book

- T. R. Ramachandran as Ramu
- Sriranjani as Raji
- Sriram as Doctor Ragunath
- S. V. Ranga Rao as Rich Man
- T. P. Muthulakshmi as Sundari
- Chandra Babu as Boxing Fan
- P. Vasundhara as Roopa
- S. Venkat as Referee
- T. S. Velayutham as Kannaiah
- T. N. Meenakshi as Doctor's mother
- G. V. Sharma as Worker
- K. R. Chellam as Raji's aunt
- K. S. Hariharan as Municipal Chairman
- V. K. Achari as Chandamarudha Singam
- Jagadeesan as Boxing Fan
- P. Susheela as Sheela
- Ganapathi Bhat as Policeman
- S. R. Lakshmi as Kumari Mohana
- T. S. B. Rao as Dharvan
- T. E. Krishnamachari as Magistrate
- V. P. S. Mani as Inspector
- V. T. Kalyanam as Kailasam
- P. K. Krishnan as Boxer
- T. N. Govindarajan as Policeman
- Master Krishnamoorthi as Baby Ramu
- Vimala as Housemaid

Dance

- Roy Chowdhury, Balaraman, Jayaraman, Kantha, Rajeswari, Chellam, Chandra, Jamuna, Chokkamma, Saroja, Sakunthala
- Gemini Boys and Girls

== Production ==
The film was produced by S. S. Vasan, owner of Gemini Studios, and directed by K. J. Mahadevan. He made Rajee En Kanmani, an adaptation of the 1931 Charlie Chaplin film City Lights. Mahadevan stuck to the original storyline of City Lights for the most part, and included the dream ballet executed by Chaplin in his film. However, Vasan felt it was too "highbrow" and did not include it in the final cut of the film.

== Soundtrack ==
The music was composed by S. Hanumantha Rao, and the lyrics were penned by Sangu Subramaniam. The song "Malligai Poo Jaadhi Roja" sung by R. Balasaraswathi Devi became a hit, and is based on "La Violetera," a Spanish copla song, composed by José Padilla and " La Paloma" by the Spanish Basque composer Sebastián Iradier.

Song	Singer	Length
"Malligai Poo Jaadhi Roja"	R. Balasaraswathi Devi	04:57
"Thoongaayo Dhuraiye"	R. Balasaraswathi Devi	02:29
"Sundhara Malare"	R. Balasaraswathi Devi	02:11
"Ammaa Vareero"	R. Balasaraswathi Devi	
"Ulagam Ithuthaano"	V. N. Sundaram	03:09

Telugu version

Music was composed by S. Hanumantha Rao and the lyrics were penned by Devulapalli Krishnasastri. All the tunes for all the songs and singers for both languages are the same.

Song	Singer	Length
"Mallepoolu Mollapoolu"	R. Balasaraswathi Devi	04:57
"Managalana — Raavu"	R. Balasaraswathi Devi	
"Meeraina Chusi Teluparamma"	R. Balasaraswathi Devi	
"Amma Ivigonamma Dayatho"	R. Balasaraswathi Devi	
"Nindu Vennela"	R. Balasaraswathi Devi	
"Inthena Brathukantha Inthena"	A. M. Rajah	03:09
"Rammani Cheppiraave"		
"Holiday Holiday Holiday"		

== Reception ==
The film was praised for its story and the performances of Ranga Rao, Ramachandran and Sriranjani, but became a box office failure.
