= Bala Nagamma (1942 film) =

1942 film

- Poster
- Directed by: C. Pullayya
- Written by: Balijepalli Lakshmikanta Kavi
- Produced by: S. S. Vasan
- Starring: Kanchanamala; Govindarajula Subba Rao
- Cinematography: Sailen Bose; B. S. Ranga
- Edited by: Chandru; N. K. Gopal
- Music by: M. D. Parthasarathy; S. Rajeswara Rao
- Production company: Gemini Studios
- Distributed by: Gemini Studios
- Release date: 17 December 1942 (India)
- Running time: 220 minutes
- Language: Telugu

Bala Nagamma is a 1942 Telugu-language film directed by C. Pullayya and produced by S. S. Vasan. The story Bala Nagamma was one of the most popular Burrakathas. It was one of the successful early films made by Gemini Studios in Telugu which was not remade in Tamil. Gemini Studios remade the film in Hindi titled Bahut Din Huwe (1954), starring Madhubala . The film was remade in Telugu in 1959 with the same name under the direction of Vedantam Raghavayya.

== Plot ==
The story is about Bala Nagamma, a young princess. The queen Bhulakshmi wife of King Navabhojaraju, prays Jatangi Muni for progeny and is blessed with seven children; the youngest of them is named Bala Nagamma (Kanchanamala). She is married off to Karyavardi Raju (Banda). She is kidnapped by Mayala Marathi (Govindarajula Subbarao), who turns her into a dog and takes her to his cave at Nagullapudi Gattu. Once there, he tries to take advantage of her. She keeps him away by chanting a Vratam (Holy Rites) and Pujas that she is involved in. She is a prisoner in the cave for fourteen years, during which time the Mayala Marathi's mistress, Sangu (Pushpavalli), becomes jealous. In the meantime, her son Balavardi Raju grows up and discovers that his mother is at Nagallapudi gattu as a captive of Mayala Fakir. He seeks the Fakir out through a flower-vendor Tambali peddi by posing as her grandson. Then, he defeats the Fakir and rescues his mother.

== Cast ==
Male cast

- Dr. Govindarajula Subba Rao as Mayala Marathi
- Banda Kanaka Lingeswara Rao B.A., B.L. as Karyavardhi Raju
- Balijepalli Lakshmikantha Kavi as Navabhoja Raju
- Master Viswam as Balavardhi Raju
- Podila Venkata Krishnamurthy as Ramavardhi Raju
- Relangi Venkatramaiah as Kotwal Rama Singh
- Lanka Satyam as Chakali Tippudu
- V. Lakshmikantham as Astrologer
- Addala Narayana Rao as Nagendrudu
- Karra Suryanarayana as Puli Raju

Female cast

- Kanchanamala as Balanagamma
- Pushpavalli as Rani Sangu
- Bellary Lalitha as Bhulakshmi
- Kamala Devi as Mandula Manikyam
- Seetabayamma as Durga
- Ratnamala as Seetali (Chakali Tippudu’s Wife)
- Anjani Bai as Tambali Peddi
- Saraswati as Young Balanagamma
- Kamala as Young Suryanagamma
- Kamalakumari as Dasi

== Soundtrack ==
There are three songs in the film.

1. "Naa Sogase Kani Marude Dasudu Kada" – Pushpavalli
2. "Nanna Memu Delhi Potham"
3. "Sri Jaya Jaya Gowri Ramana" – Bellary Lalitha

== Reception ==
According to film historian Randor Guy, Bala Nagamma netted a profit of ₹40 lakh (equivalent to ₹59 crore or US$6.1 million in 2023).
