= Insaniyat (1955 film) =

- Poster
- Directed by: S. S. Vasan
- Written by: Ramanand Sagar (dialogues)
- Story by: B. A. Subba Rao; Tapi Dharma Rao; P. Adinarayana Rao
- Based on: Palletoori Pilla (a 1950 Telugu film)
- Produced by: S. S. Vasan
- Starring: Dilip Kumar; Dev Anand; Bina Rai
- Cinematography: P. Ellappa
- Edited by: M. Umanatha Rao
- Music by: C. Ramchandra
- Production company: Gemini Studios
- Release date: 30 September 1955
- Country: India
- Language: Hindi

Insaniyat (transl. Humanity) is a 1955 Hindi-language action film produced and directed by S. S. Vasan. The film stars Dilip Kumar, Dev Anand and Bina Rai. The film's songs were written by Rajendra Krishan. The film's music is by C. Ramchandra. It is a remake of 1950 Telugu film Palletoori Pilla and is the only film to feature Dilip Kumar and Dev Anand together onscreen.

== Plot ==
A once loyal soldier faces many challenges after turning into a rebel.

== Cast ==
- Dilip Kumar as Mangal
- Dev Anand as Bhanu Pratap
- Bina Rai as Durga
- Vijayalakshmi as Chanda
- Jayant as Zangoora
- Jairaj as Martand
- Shobhna Samarth as Mangal's Mother
- Badri Prasad as Durga's Father
- Mijjan Kumar as Vaidji
- Agha as Bhola
- Mohana Cabral as Chameli
- T. Mukherjee as Madhav
- Ishwarlal as Spy
- G. V. Sharma as Spy
- G. Bhatt as Employee
- Gemini Boys and Girls
- Zippy as Zippo

== Production ==
Insaniyat was a remake of the 1950 Telugu film Palletoori Pilla, and remained the only film where Dilip Kumar and Dev Anand worked together.

The role of Bhanu Pratap was first offered to Bharat Bhushan, but he declined the offer.

In his later years, Dev Anand admitted his regret and displeasure doing the film. In an interview, he said:

"In Insaniyat, I was very uncomfortable. I used to go to Madras and meet Mr Vasan. They would give me those costumes to perform. I did it happily, because work is work and duty is duty. But I don't think it suited me and I never went there again."

== Soundtrack ==
All music was composed by C. Ramchandra and lyrics were by Rajendra Krishan.

Song	Singer
"Chup Chup Chup"	Lata Mangeshkar
"Meri Asha Ke Phool"	Lata Mangeshkar
"Tere Sang Sang Sang"	Lata Mangeshkar
"Rakhiyo Mori Laj Prabhu"	Lata Mangeshkar
"Aayi Jhoomti Bahar, Layi Dil Ka Karaar"	Lata Mangeshkar, Talat Mahmood
"Zulm Sahe Na, Zulm Kare Na, Yahi Hamara Nara Hai"	Lata Mangeshkar, Mohammed Rafi
"Main Raavan, Lanka Naresh"	Manna Dey, Mohammed Rafi
"Aashiq Agar Hai Pyare, Kaudi Na Rakh Kafan Ko"	C. Ramchandra, Mohammed Rafi
"Tu Hai Mera Chacha"	Mohammed Rafi
"Raja Beta Bada Hoke"	Mohammed Rafi
"Gori Kar Le Tu Aaj Singar"	Mohammed Rafi
"Apni Chhaya Mein"	Mohammed Rafi
"Bansuriya Bole, Madhur Ras Ghole"	Mohammed Rafi, Asha Bhosle
"Aisi Nainwa Ki Lagi Kataar, Ke Jiya Kare"	Mohammed Rafi, Asha Bhosle
"Haseenon Ka Manzoor"	Asha Bhosle
"Sunte Hai Koi Maut Ka"	Hemant Kumar
