= Dasi Aparanji =

- Theatrical release poster
- Directed by: B. N. Rao
- Screenplay by: Kothamangalam Subbu
- Story by: Kothamangalam Subbu
- Produced by: S. S. Vasan
- Starring: Pushpavalli; M. K. Radha
- Cinematography: B. S. Ranga
- Edited by: N. K. Gopal
- Music by: M. D. Parthasarathy; S. Rajeswara Rao
- Production company: Gemini Studios
- Distributed by: Gemini Studios
- Release date: 10 August 1944
- Country: India
- Language: Tamil

Dasi Aparanji is a 1944 Indian Tamil-language historical fantasy film directed by B. N. Rao and produced by S. S. Vasan. The film stars Pushpavalli and M. K. Radha. It revolves around the antics of king Vikramadithan after his soul enters the body of a parrot, and manipulates a girl named Aparanji. The film was released on 10 August 1944. No print of it is known to survive, making it a lost film.

== Plot ==
Vikramadithan, the king of Ujjain, goes for his wonted six-month retirement to the forest. Unable to bear the anguish of a mother parrot at the death of her offspring, he arranges that his soul enters the body of the parrot. Vijayan, his greedy friend, seizes the opportunity to further his own designs and abuses the trust reposed in him by the king who had taught him the art of transmigration of souls, by himself entering the body of the king and destroying his own body. Vijayan's trick is found out by Prime Minister Bhatti who arranges for queen Padmavathi to stay away from the bogus king on the pretext of a vow of celibacy.

The parrot containing the soul of Vikramadithan is bought by a miserly Chettiar whose son fritters away all his wealth for the sake of Aparanji, a dancing girl. When the Chettiar is holding the village panchayat to decide a complaint by the dancing girl against the priest of the local temple, the parrot puts her to shame saying that one day she would walk the streets with a begging bowl. Aparanji persuades the Chettiar's son to steal the parrot to help her vow that she would have it killed and eaten.

Aparanji's servant Singari is entrusted with the cooking of the parrot, but it escapes by a ruse. Singari cooks a fowl and serves it to Aparanji who believes the parrot is dead. When she goes to the temple, a voice (the parrot's) tells her to spend all her riches on charity and come to the temple as a beggar with a begging bowl; Aparanji thinks it is God's voice. She gives away all her wealth and walks to the temple as a sanyasini with the bowl where the parrot reveals itself. Aparanji however decides to continue as a sanyasini. Bhatti, by a ruse, makes Vijayan, who is posing as the king, enter the body of a ram and in that form he is exiled.

== Cast ==
- Pushpavalli as Aparanji
- M. K. Radha as Vikramadithan
- N. A. Sundaram as Padmavathi
- M. V. Mani as Bhatti
- M. R. Swaminathan as Vijayan
- Puliyoor Duraisami Iyer as Dhanapal Chetty
- Kothamangalam Seenu as Bangaru Chetty
- L. Narayana Rao as Mama
- Kothamangalam Subbu as Gurukkal
- M. S. Sundari Bai as Singari
- S. Vasudeva Iyer as Shastri
- Jayalakshmi Ammal as Apoorvam

== Production ==
Dasi Aparanji was directed by B. N. Rao and produced by S. S. Vasan of Gemini Studios. Cinematography was handled by B. S. Ranga, and art direction by A. K. Shekar.

== Soundtrack ==
The soundtrack was composed by M. D. Parthasarathy and S. Rajeswara Rao. The lyrics were written by Kothamangalam Subbu.

Song	Singer	Duration
"Kanavendum Kailaiyai"	T. V. Rathnam	02:45
"Velaikkarakeli Pozhaippu"	M. S. Sundari Bai	02:26
"Aasai Kollaathavaran Pillaiyo"	M. S. Sundari Bai	02:37
"Entha Naalum Piriyene"	Kothamangalam Seenu, T. V. Rathnam	02:03

== Release and reception ==
Dasi Aparanji was released on 10 August 1944. The film became controversial upon release because of the numerous sexual references. Kay Yess Enn of The Indian Express wrote, "Mr. S. S. Vasan deserves congratulations on two very welcome reforms he has effected in this picture. It does not run to more than two hours and utilises only Carnatic music. It is to be hoped that the days of long dreary Tamil pictures glorifying Hindustani tunes are gone once and for all." The Hindu wrote, "The story has been well depicted. The film offers good entertainment and maintains the technical excellence of the Gemini Studios."

Swadesamitran wrote, "One can go on seeing this picture a number of times just for the sake of the temple corridor, the statue of Aparanji and other effective settings." Dinamani wrote, "The songs are a noteworthy feature of this film – especially the aptness of the tunes and the fact that they are all Karnatic." Sunday Times wrote, "Well acted and directed, superbly photographed, full glamour and humour and masterly edited, Dasi Aparanji is really enjoyable and has good production values." Sunday Herald wrote, "The fitting cast, the standard of photography and audiography, skillful direction, the first rate dialogues abounding with wit, fine dances and settings together with the "Itness" of Pushpavalli, all contribute to the success of the picture."
