= V. A. K. Ranga Rao =

V.A.K Ranga Rao
- Born: 1938 (age 87–88); Madras
- Occupations: Scholar, dancer, film historian, book reviewer, art critic, orator, collector, film and music critic
- Known for: Largest collection of 78rpm records in the world and for Music reviews.
- Notable work: Alapana, Maro Aalapana
- Parent(s): Ravu Janardana Krishna Ranga Rao and Saraswathi Devi

Ravu Venkata Anandakumara Krishna Ranga Rao, better known as V.A.K Ranga Rao, is an Indian music scholar, dancer, film historian, book reviewer, art critic, and orator. He was born to Ravu Janardana Krishna Ranga Rao, the younger brother of Raja of Bobbili and Saraswathi Devi, the younger sister of Rani of Bobbili and is a descendant of the royal family of Bobbili, near Visakhapatnam, India. His father was titled the Zamindar of Chikkavaram.

He is known for having the largest collection of 78 rpm records in the world. The Limca Book of World Records claims the number of records to be 53,000.

He possesses first recordings of more than 50 Indian singers; among them are Ghantasala, Hemant Kumar, M.S Subbalakshmi, and Lata Mangeshkar. It was V A K Ranga Rao who had admired Ghantasala as the most majestic voice. His collection has music in more than 15 foreign languages some of which are Latin, Greek and Russian and more than 40 Indian languages including Tulu and Toda. His collection also includes plays, speeches, and recitations of eminent personalities such as Tagore.
