= Nandanar (1942 film) =

Nandanar நந்தனார்
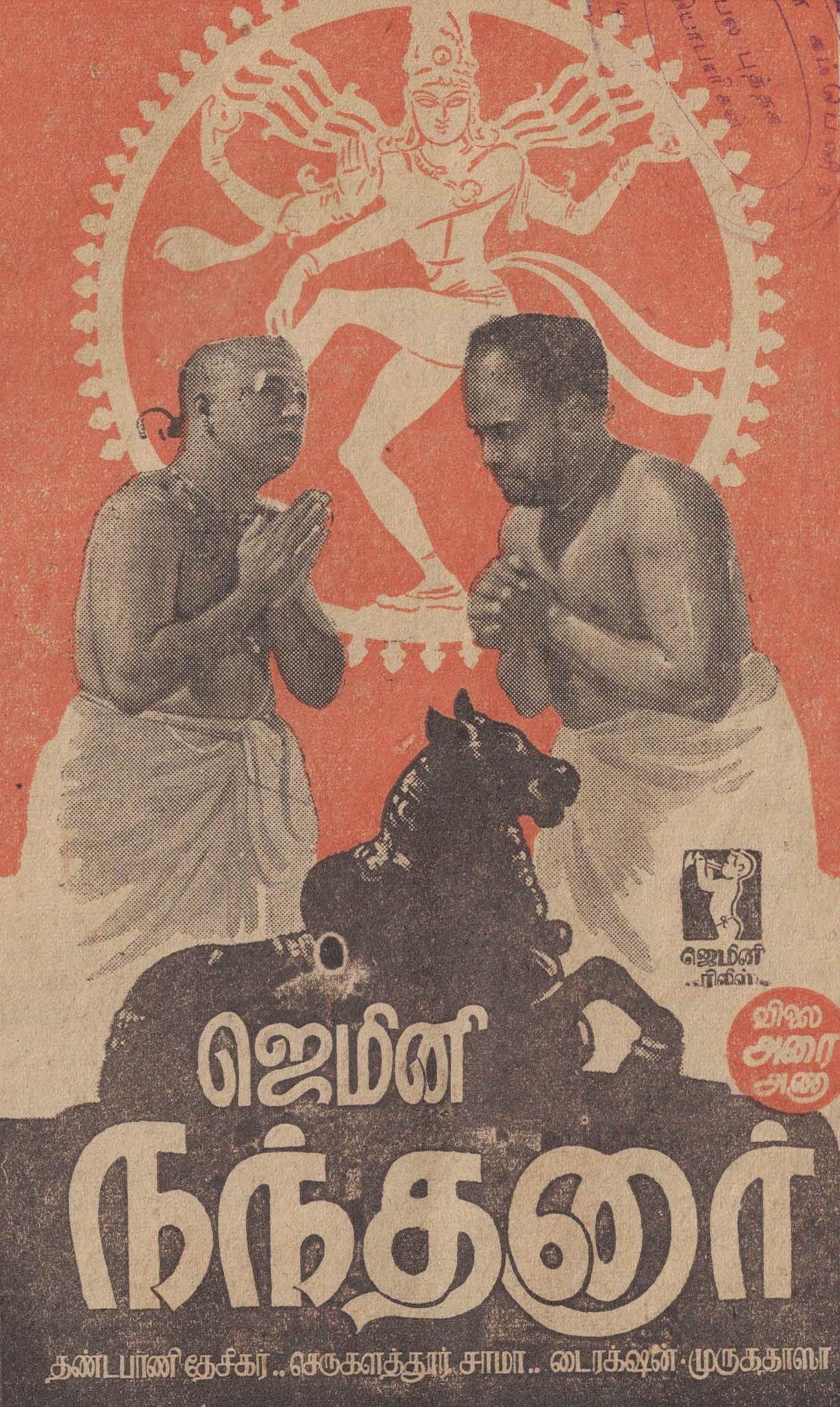
- Film Poster
- Directed by: Murugadasa (A. Muthuswamy Iyer)
- Written by: Ki. Ra. (K. Ramachandran)
- Based on: Musical Play Nandan Charithram by Gopalkrishna Bharathiyar
- Produced by: S. S. Vasan
- Starring: M. M. Dandapani Desikar; Serukalathur Sama; Sundari Bai; M. R. Swaminathan; Ranjan
- Cinematography: Sailen Bose; B. S. Ranga
- Edited by: C. Panju; N. R. Krishnamoorthy
- Music by: M. D. Parthasarathy; S. Rajeswara Rao
- Production company: Gemini Studios
- Release date: 20 September 1942
- Running time: 142 minutes
- Country: India
- Language: Tamil

Nandanar (தமிழ்: நந்தனார்) is 1942 Indian devotional film, based on the Nandan, a low-caste farmhand, and his deep devotion to Lord Nataraja of Chidambaram. Nandanar was a major success, in part because of an innovative prize scheme.

The film was directed by Muruga Dossa and produced by S. S. Vasan under his production company Gemini Studios. The film script was written by Ki. Ra. (Ki. Ramachandran), with music by M. D. Parthasarathy and S. Rajeswara Rao. Starring M. M. Dandapani Desikar (his played titled role) and Serukalathur Sama played lead role and M. R. Swamynathan, Sundari Bai and others played supporting roles. Actor Ranjan appeared as Lord Shiva in one scene in the film.

== Background ==
The story of Nandanar was told as a musical title by Gopalakrishna Bharathiyar's Nandan Charithram in the early 19th century. Bharathiyar's work was an immensely popular example of Harikatha.

This was the fifth series of films on Nandhanar made in Tamil. The earlier versions were made in 1923 (silent), 1930 (talkie), 1935 (talkie) and in 1942. The most successful among these versions was made by Gemini Studios in 1942 with M. M. Dandapani Desikar, a well known Carnatic musician with a melodious voice and one of the early singing stars who played the role Nandhan. Its concept was similar to Nandanar (1935 film) (also known as Bhaktha Nandanar), which starred K. B. Sundarambal as Nandhanar. Though earlier films on Nandhanar failed, this 1942 version was a huge commercial success. The film made an impact among the audience, especially among Harijans (pariah), who were considered untouchable at that time.

== Plot ==
Nandan (M. M. Dandapani Desikar), a pariah (Untouchable) by caste, is a simple farmer. He is the bonded slave of Brahmin landlord Vediyar (Serukalathur Sama), who is an ardent devotee of Lord Shiva (Ranjan). Vediyar's assistant Jambu (Narayana Rao) treats the slaves badly. However, Vedhiyar has a soft corner for Nandan for his devotion and disciplined way of living. Nandan, who lives with his mother, prays to Lord Shiva all the time and propagates good living by praising the lord to his fellow villagers. Valluvan (M. R. Swaminathan), a priest at the village's Karuppuswamy temple, gets angry with Nandan's propaganda on Lord Shiva. When Valluvan and the villagers try to sacrifice goats at the local temple festival, Nandan stops them and convinces them that animals are also like human beings, so no God will demand animal sacrifice.

Nandan explains the greatness of Lord Shiva; when other villagers want to see the lord, he takes them to have his Darshanam at Sivalokanathar Temple, Tirupunkur. Nandan and the villagers are grieved when the Nandi statue blocked the view of Lord Shiva there. Nandan sings in praise of the lord, the statue miraculously moves aside and Nandan and villagers get a darshanam of the lord. The word spreads on the power of Nandan's prayer; more villagers join him and start chanting Lord Shiva's name. Valluvan gets upset and complains to Vedhiyar about Nandan's behavior of converting the villagers and stopping the sacrifices. Vedhiyar calls Nandan and warns him to stop such activities.

However, Nandan seeks Vedhiyar's permission to go to Chidambaram to see Thillai Nataraja Temple which is his long-cherished dream. Vedhiyar refuses and instead, forces him to work even more in the farm. Nandan works in the farm mechanically without even eating for many days with the hope of getting permission to go to Chidambaram. He keeps singing in praise of lord Nataraja, joined by other workers in the field. Finally, to put him in his place, Vedhiyar permits him go to Chithambaram with the condition that he can go only after cultivating the crop in 40 acres (veli) land. Nandan is shocked with his impossible condition and pleads with the landlord to reconsider. However, Vedhiyar refuses and insists that Nandan can go only after cultivating the entire vast area.

Nandan gets dejected, chants Lord Shiva's name and faints. Lord Shiva comes to his rescue and cultivates the entire land overnight. Next day, this miracle in the village astonishes everyone. Vedhiyar realises his mistake, understands the power of Nandan's prayer, falls at his feet, seeks his forgiveness and allows him go to Chithambaram. Nandan goes to Chithambaram but remains outside the temple as, being an untouchable, he cannot enter it. At night, Lord Shiva appears in the dream of the Chithambaram temple priests and informs them that Nandan has come to see him, is waiting outside the town, and orders them to bring him to the temple. The priests locate Nandan and ask him to accompany them to the temple. When he is about to enter the temple, a few Brahmins in the gathering object to a pariah entering the sacred temple. The priests then decide to carry out the fire ritual by which Nandan has to go through fire to clear his pariah status. The sacred fire is prepared; Nandan goes around the fire, and with the lord's name on his lips, walks into the fire. He emerges from the fire with a new holy body, with sacred ashes smeared all over and the holy thread. He is taken inside the temple by the priests. He worships Lord Nataraja, then disappears and unifies with Lord. Nandan's prayers to be with Lord Shiva are finally answered.

== Cast ==
Cast according to the opening credits of the film:

- Dhandapani Desikar as Nandan
- Serukalathur Sama as Vedhiyar (Brahmin)
- Narayana Rao as Jambu
- M. R. Swaminathan as Valluvan
- Velayutham as Minnidian
- Appanna Iyengar as Mondhai
- Krishnamoorthy as Pottai
- Kothamangalam Subbu as Dikshitar
- Kolathu Mani as Dikshitar
- Ramasami Pillai as Great Old Man
- Puliyoor Duraisami Iyer as Zealot
- Rajam Iyengar as Mamundi
- Gnanambal as Vedhiyar's (Brahmin's) Wife
- Jayalakshmi Ammal as Nandan's Mother
- Angamuthu as Vellachi
- Sundari Bai as Karuppi
- Sakku Bai as Heroine
- Ranjan B.A., M.LiT. as Shiva Thandavam

== Soundtrack ==
Nandanar (1942 film)

Soundtrack album by M. D. Parthasarathy and Rajeswara Rao
- Released: 1942
- Recorded: 1942
- Genres: Sareegama and Carnatic
- Language: Tamil
- Labels: Nandanar-1942-M. M. Dhandapani Desikar, Nandanar Song Menu card
- Producers: M. D. Parathasarathy and Rajeswara Rao

Music was composed by M. D. Parthasarathy and Rajeswara Rao. Lyrics were written by Papanasam Sivan and Kothamangalam Subbu. Some of the original compositions of Gopalakishna Bharathiyar were used in the film. Papanasam Sivan composed one song in the film. The song "Sivaloga Nathanai Kandu" was composed (in raga "Nathanamakriya" and Bharathiyar composed it in Senjurutti), "Vazhi Marathirukirathey" (in raga "Thodi"), "Ellarum Varungal" (in raga Bilahari; Bharathiyar composed in Behag) and "Pitham Theyliya" (in raga "Sankarabharanam". The songs "Sivaloka Nathanai", "Pirava Varam" and "Ananda Nadamidum" were based on ragas Mayamalavagowla, Lathangi and Kedaragowla respectively. "Ayya Methakadinam"(raga Malika Bharathiyar composed it in Punnaagavarali, "Varugalaamo" (Maanji) and "Chithambara Darisham" (raga in Mukhari and Bharathiyar composed it in Asveri). S. S. Vasan's demanding recording process made the best of Desikar's singing talents, but angered the star in the process.

No	Songs	Singers	Lyrics	Length(m:ss)
1	"Anandha Nadamedum"		Papanasam Sivan Gopalakrishna Bharathi	
2	"Ellai Pidariyae"		Papanasam Sivan Gopalakrishna Bharathi	
3	"Unaiyellar Kaathi Yaar"	Serukalathur Sama	Papanasam Sivan Gopalakrishna Bharathi	
4	"Thillai Ambala"	M. M. Dandapani Desikar & Serukalathur Sama	Papanasam Sivan Gopalakrishna Bharathi	01:56
5	"Paavi Paarayan"	M. M. Dandapani Desikar	Papanasam Sivan Gopalakrishna Bharathi	02:40
6	"Enakkum Irangi"	M. M. Dandapani Desikar	Papanasam Sivan Gopalakrishna Bharathi	
7	"Ellorum Varungal"	M. M. Dandapani Desikar	Papanasam Sivan Gopalakrishna Bharathi	01:11
8	"Kana Kann Vendumo"	M. M. Dandapani Desikar	Papanasam Sivan Gopalakrishna Bharathi	01:36
9	"Ulaganathan Thaalam"	M. M. Dandapani Desikar	Papanasam Sivan Gopalakrishna Bharathi	
10	"Veeraadum"	M. M. Dandapani Desikar	Papanasam Sivan Gopalakrishna Bharathi	03:13
11	"Sivaloga Nathanai"	M. M. Dandapani Desikar	Papanasam Sivan Gopalakrishna Bharathi	03:07
12	"Sambo Sankara Samba"	M. M. Dandapani Desikar	Papanasam Sivan Gopalakrishna Bharathi	
13	"Varugalaamo Ayya"	M. M. Dandapani Desikar	Papanasam Sivan Gopalakrishna Bharathi	03:44
14	"Vara Vara Kettu Pochu"	M. M. Dandapani Desikar	Papanasam Sivan Gopalakrishna Bharathi	
15	"Jathiyillum Kidaiyaen"	M. M. Dandapani Desikar	Papanasam Sivan Gopalakrishna Bharathi	02:20
16	"Vazhi Marathirukkirathe"	M. M. Dandapani Desikar	Papanasam Sivan Gopalakrishna Bharathi	5:33
17	"Hara Hara Jagatheesa"	M. M. Dandapani Desikar	Papanasam Sivan Gopalakrishna Bharathi	02:03
18	"Piravaa Varam Tharum"	M. M. Dandapani Desikar	Papanasam Sivan Gopalakrishna Bharathi	01:53
19	"En Appanallavaa"	M. M. Dandapani Desikar	Papanasam Sivan Gopalakrishna Bharathi	01:49
20	"Piththam Theliya"	M. M. Dandapani Desikar	Papanasam Sivan Gopalakrishna Bharathi	02:44
21	"Ayyae Mettha Kadinam"	M. M. Dandapani Desikar	Papanasam Sivan Gopalakrishna Bharathi	03:14
22	"Kaamamagatriya"	M. M. Dandapani Desikar	Kothamangalam Subbu	02:22
23	"Ambala Paatte Arul Paattu"	M. M. Dandapani Desikar	Kothamangalam Subbu	
24	"Kaakkavendum Kadavule"		Kothamangalam Subbu	
25	"Manja Kulichavale"	Pottai Krishnamoorthy	Kothamangalam Subbu	
26	"Veeran Irulan Kaataeri"	M. D. Parthasarathy	Kothamangalam Subbu	
27	"Natta Nadavu Chezhikka Venum"	Kothamangalam Subbu and group	Kothamangalam Subbu	
28	"Ellai Pidaariye"	Kothamangalam Subbu and group	Kothamangalam Subbu	
29	"Vara Vara Kettu Pochchu"	Kothamangalam Subbu and group	Kothamangalam Subbu	
30	"Uyarap Panai Mael Kalayam"	M. R. Swaminathan	Kothamangalam Subbu	
31	"Vandiyit Paaram Pottu"	M. S. Sundari Bai	Kothamangalam Subbu	

== Reception ==
Marketing

The film is based on a musical Nandan Charithram by Gopalakrishna Bharathiyar. Wellington theatre, where the film was released, was decorated like a temple and the Nandhi statue used in the film was kept inside the theatre. For many, coming to this film become an experience like visiting at Temple. S. S. Vasan well - known for the innovative marketing of his films, announced an unbelievable Rs. 10.000 prize song contest for Nandhanar. Moviegoers were asked to choose the three best songs in the order of merit and the drop the answer sheet along with counterfoil of the cinema ticket in a box provided at movie houses where the film was being screened. This was the first time such an innovative scheme was introduced in South Indian films. Vasan had deposited the pre - chosen list of best three songs in a sealed envelope with Indian Bank at First Line Beach (now Rajaji Salai) well before the prize scheme was announced. Since the gramophone records of the film were not released (release after 100 days of the film), a person wishing to participate in the contest had to watch the film and submit his reply with the ticket counterfoil. This plan of S. S. Vasan contributed immensely to the box office success of the film. The contest drew huge crowds; 20 winners were selected and prize money was equality distributed among them by S. S. Vasan.

== See also ==
- Nandanar

== Bibliography ==
- Dhananjayan, G. (2014). Pride of Tamil Cinema: 1931 to 2013. Blue Ocean Publishers. ISBN 978-93-84301-05-7.
- "nandanar 1935 film". soundandshadow. 9 October 2011.
- "gemini studios era". soundandshadow. 8 October 2011.
- "TFM Take Off The 1940s". mayyam.
- "2015 01 01 archive". vamananinsight.
- Madras Studios: Narrative, Genre, and Ideology in Tamil Cinema. Sage Publications. 2015. ISBN 978-9351501213.
