= Kannamma En Kadhali =

- Poster
- Directed by: Kothamangalam Subbu
- Screenplay by: Kothamangalam Subbu
- Based on: The School for Wives by Moliere
- Produced by: K. Ramnoth
- Starring: M. K. Radha; M. S. Sundari Bai
- Cinematography: M. Natarajan
- Edited by: N. K. Gopal
- Music by: M. D. Parthasarathy
- Production company: Gemini Studios
- Release date: 20 July 1945 (India)
- Running time: 10,914 ft.
- Country: India
- Language: Tamil

Kannamma En Kadhali (transl. Kannamma is my lover) is a 1945 Indian Tamil-language film starring M. K. Radha and M. S. Sundari Bai. The film was directed by Kothamangalam Subbu, marking his directorial debut. No print of the film is known to survive, making it a lost film.

== Plot ==
A wealthy, lecherous old man named Vaiyapuri finds a young girl lost in a temple festival crowd and brings her up with the intention of marrying her later. Without his knowledge, the young woman, Sundari falls in love with a young man Muthu and the two play smart games fooling Vaiyapuri.

== Cast ==
Cast in order of the film's song book

- M. K. Radha as Muthu
- M. S. Sundari Bai as Sundari
- L. Narayana Rao as Vaiyapuri
- P. A. Subbaiah Pillai as Doctor
- S. Krishnamoorthy as Pottai
- Kulathu Mani as Natesa Mudaliar
- Appanna Iyengar as Kuppan
- Angamuthu as Pechi

- Velayutham as Velayutham
- Ramamurthi as Thief
- Viswanathan as Doctor Sundaresan
- Joker Ramadu as Astrologer
- Seetharaman as Priest
- Sundara Rao as Friend
- Chitralekha, Dhanam as Female Dancers
- Niranjala Devi as Young Dancer

== Production ==
This film is based on the French play The School for Wives by the 17th century playwright Molière.

== Soundtrack ==
Music was composed by M. D. Parthasarathy and lyrics were penned by Kothamangalam Subbu.

No.	Song	Singer/s	Lyricist	Duration(m:ss)
1	"Bangalow Kattiruken Baru"	M. S. Sundari Bai	Kothamangalam Subbu	02:03
2	"Manmadhan Dhane"	M. S. Sundari Bai	Kothamangalam Subbu	
3	"Thulli Vilayadum Pulliman"	M. K. Radha	Kothamangalam Subbu	
4	"Muthu Varuvanendru Vethilai"	M. S. Sundari Bai	Kothamangalam Subbu	
5	"Neela Kumudhamalar Unadhu"	M. K. Radha, M. S. Sundari Bai	Kothamangalam Subbu	
6	"Eppodhum Unnae Tirukka Chonnar"	M. K. Radha, M. S. Sundari Bai	Kothamangalam Subbu	01:36
7	"Katti Padikkiran Mutham Kottukiran"	S. Krishnamoorthy	Kothamangalam Subbu	00:45
