= Avvaiyar (film) =

1953 film by Kothamangalam Subbu

- Theatrical release poster
- Directed by: Kothamangalam Subbu
- Written by: Kothamangalam Subbu; Ki. Ra; Gemini Studios Story Department
- Produced by: S. S. Vasan
- Starring: K. B. Sundarambal
- Cinematography: Thambu
- Edited by: N. K. Gopal
- Music by: M. D. Parthasarathy; P. S. Anandaraman; Mayavaram Venu
- Production company: Gemini Studios
- Distributed by: Gemini Studios
- Release date: 15 August 1953
- Running time: 174 minutes
- Country: India
- Language: Tamil

Avvaiyar is a 1953 Indian Tamil-language historical drama film directed by Kothamangalam Subbu, and produced by S. S. Vasan. The film stars K. B. Sundarambal as the title character. It was released on 15 August 1953.

== Plot ==
When a childless couple find a baby left alone, they prefer to adopt her. Since they are rich and childless, they raise her in wealth and pomp. But when the girl grows up, she concentrates upon Lord Vinayagar and not thinking of marriage like other girls of her age. When the parents think of her marriage, she tries to escape from it, as she is devoted more to Lord Vinayagar. Hence, she prays to become an old-aged woman (as no young man likes to marry an old lady). Lord Vinayagar obliges and when others see it, they feel shell-shocked and understand what has happened. Now, this old woman is named Avvaiyar. Avvaiyar leaves her parents' village to go around many places preaching Vinayagar's greatness through her songs. She also solves many problems. Impressed by her devotion, a local king and his two daughters ask her to stay at the court for some days. Avvaiyar is impressed by their hospitality and blesses them. And once again she goes around preaching and solving many problems. Now, after a long time, she once again encounters the two princesses, but in ordinary dress living in a hut. She then learns that their father's enemies killed him and imprisoned the person (Gemini Ganesan) who was to marry the two girls. Avvaiyar approaches the kings who were the slain king's former friends. But they refuse as they are afraid of the powerful enemies. Hence Avvaiyar herself goes to save Gemini Ganeshan. When she prays to Vinayagar, he sends many elephants towards the enemies' fort and the wild elephants destroy the enemies and bring back the man. Now, with her mission over, she moves to another place where a boy asks a funny question, to which she could not give a convincing reply. Then the boy reveals himself to be the Lord Murugan whom Avvaiyar worshipped. Murugan says that Avvaiyar can now leave the world to join the place of the divine.

== Cast ==
Cast according to the opening credits

Female cast

- K. B. Sundarambal as Avvaiyar
- Kusalakumari as Kumari Avvai
- Baby Saraswathi as Young Avvai
- Kumari Vanaja as Elankuzhali
- M. S. Sundari Bai as Ammalu
- T. V. Kumudhini as Sivakami
- Nagarathnam as Kurathi
- Udhayathara as Kurathi
- Meera as Angavai
- Thulasi as Sangavai

Female supporting cast

- Sokkamma, Chandra, Jamuna, Chellam,
  Sakunthala, Saroja, Radha.

Male cast

- M. K. Radha as Pari
- D. Balasubramaniam as Panar
- L. Narayana Rao as Azhwar
- Kothamangalam Subbu as Veerayan
- Ganesan as Deiveegan
- K. Ramasami as Poet
- G. Pattu Iyer as Valluvar
- Velayutham as Kuravan
- Pudukottai Seenu as Sakkaram
- C. V. V. Panthulu as Poet
- Ashokan as Chozhan
- G. V. Sharma as Velaiyam
- Natarajan as Shopkeeper

Male cast (continued)

- P. M. Devam as Adikaman
- S. M. Durai as Kapilar
- T. E. Krishnamachari as Pandian
- V. P. S. Mani as Minister
- Raja Dhandapani as Commander
- Natanam Nataraj as Pantaram
- Balan as Cheran
- Kumar as Young Murugan

Male supporting cast

- Vijaya Rao, Sampathkumar, T. S. B. Rao, Balaraman, P. V. S. Raju, Meenakshisundaram, Gopalakrishnan, Krishnamoorthy (Pottai), Venkat Rao, Jagadisha Iyer, S. G. Subbaiah.

== Production ==
Vasan wanted to make a film on saint poet Avvaiyar from 1941 and had given instructions to his story department to conduct research on the life and times of the famed poet and work on a draft script. More than two years were invested in the research. Vasan entrusted this job to Tamil scholar Kothamangalam Subbu which resulted in a collection of data which were either objectionable or controversial. Some scholars even told Subbu that "there was no such person called Avvaiyar! All kinds of people wrote philosophical poems and songs and passed them off as written by Avvai!" However, Vasan and Subbu never gave up and after much effort, a workable script was ready.

Vasan decided that the only actor who could portray the role of Avvaiyar with conviction would be the celebrated stage and film actor, Carnatic musician K. B. Sundarambal. K. Balaji who went on to become a famous producer made his debut as Lord Muruga in an uncredited role, while Kumar portrayed the young Lord Muruga.

Vasan screened the rough cut of Avvaiyar. His friends, staff members and their families were invited and asked to give their opinion in writing. Vasan would study all the material carefully. Well-known journalist of Ananda Vikatan who wrote under the pen name, 'Kadhir' explained that the film was slow, crawling on leaden feet with practically nothing much happening at all! It had Sundarambal walking slowly most of the time. It looked more like a documentary and not at all like a feature film. Vasan stared at him for a while and then smiled. He told his team that Kadhir was absolutely correct! He too had the same opinion and wanted to have a second opinion. He told Subbu and others that the film lacked entertainment. Immediately, he ordered the screenplay to be rewritten incorporating sequences of entertainment to elevate the box-office potential and audience appeal of the movie. That's when the sequence of the grand reception by the ancient Tamil king Paari to Avvaiyar was written to be woven into the script.

Subbu wrote it, making it an entertainment extravaganza on its own and the sequence was shot at considerable expense. An entire street set was built at a cost of Rs. 1.5 lakh, which was big money in the 1950s. Over 10,000 junior artistes took part in the spectacular sequence into which traditional folk dances were incorporated, creating a majestic visual impact on moviegoers. The sequence proved to be one of the highlights of the film.

== Soundtrack ==
The music composed by M. D. Parthasarathy, Anandaraman and Mayavaram Venu, while lyrics written by Avvaiyar, Papanasam Sivan & Kothamangalam Subbu. According to the song book, this film has huge number of songs, a rarity in Tamil cinema.

Song	Singers
"Aalai Palaavaagalaamo"	K. B. Sundarambal
"Aram Seiya Virumbu"	K. B. Sundarambal
"Ayyanae Anbarkku Meyyanae"	K. B. Sundarambal
"Bakthaavu Kaettra"	K. B. Sundarambal
"Gananaadhanae Varuga"	K. B. Sundarambal
"Jaadhi Irandozhiya Vaerillai"	K. B. Sundarambal
"Kanniththamizh Naattinilae"	K. B. Sundarambal
"Kattradhu Kai Mannalavu"	K. B. Sundarambal
"Kooriya Vaalar"	K. B. Sundarambal
"Munnai Naal Paarikku"	K. B. Sundarambal
"Muthamizh Deivame"	K. B. Sundarambal
"Nellukkiraiththa Neer"	K. B. Sundarambal
"Periyadhu Kaetkkin"	K. B. Sundarambal
"Ulaginile"	K. B. Sundarambal
"Vaelanae Senthamizh Viththagaa"	K. B. Sundarambal
"Vennila Vea"	K. B. Sundarambal
"Annaiyum Thanthaiyumaagum"	S. S. Mani Bhagavathar

== Release and reception ==
The film received positive reviews. Professor J. E. de La Harpe of the University of California wrote to Vasan, "Although I don't know one word of Tamil, I enjoyed the film immensely, being able to guess more or less the story from the scenes as it is acted out. This letter is not only to congratulate you on such a remarkable picture (the nature shots are particularly good), but to urge you to export it. Nothing could make India — at least Southern India — better understood abroad and liked than `Avvaiyar' with its rural scenes, temple processions, religious incidents, and scenes such as the one of elephants storming a city. These will send foreign audiences wild, in addition to the very interesting musical aspect; your actress has a lovely voice. Although a Frenchman, I have been living in America for 27 years. As I know the Americans, they would simply love such a picture, so different from the stuff usually fed to the public here by Hollywood. I am sure you could make a smashing success with "Avvaiyar." Only be sure to leave it just as it is, do not add a love story (such as Hollywood thinks is indispensable), and do not change the typical Indian scenes. English sub-titles will be quite sufficient to make the whole story understandable. I hope I shall be able to see `Avvaiyar' in the U.S.A. with English titles before too long." K. Venkataswami Naidu, the Minister for Religious Endowments and Registration said, "I have seen both the Telugu and Tamil versions of `Avvaiyar.' When some of us were feeling that standards are going down in film production, this movie has come as a great relief. It is a perfect picture, carrying great moral and historical value. I need not speak of technical perfection for a Gemini production." In contrast, C. Rajagopalachari, the then Chief Minister of Tamil Nadu said, "T. K. Shanmugam's play is a hundred times superior to this picture... A lot of stock scenes of thunder, lightning and storm, of water flowing and elephants trooping and cardboard fortresses falling. Avvai is too angry and cursing... The picture is poor but when so much has been spent on it and the stake is so great how can one frankly condemn it..."

== Legacy ==
According to S. Theodore Baskaran, Avvaiyar possibly started the trend for films celebrating Tamil culture and language: "A story woven around episodes from the life of the legendary poetess Avvaiyar whose works are considered to be one of the glories of Tamil literature. Every Tamil child is initiated into the language and culture through her poems. The film is dedicated to Mother Tamil and opens with a song praising Tamil Nadu. Avvaiyar herself symbolizes Mother Tamil and her deity, Murugan, is hailed as god of the Tamils". The song "Pazham Neeyappa" was remixed for Naan Avan Illai (2007), with a few lyrical changes.

== Bibliography ==
- Baskaran, S. Theodore (1996). The eye of the serpent: an introduction to Tamil cinema. East West Books.
- Craddock, Elaine (2010). Siva's Demon Devotee: Karaikkal Ammaiyar. SUNY Press. ISBN 978-1-4384-3087-4.
- Guy, Randor (1997). Starlight, Starbright: The Early Tamil Cinema. Chennai: Amra Publishers. OCLC 52794531.
- Pillai, Swarnavel Eswaran (2015). Madras Studios: Narrative, Genre, and Ideology in Tamil Cinema. SAGE Publications. ISBN 978-93-5150-212-8.
