= Gemini Studios =

Indian film studio (1940-1994)

- Type: Limited
- Industry: Motion pictures
- Founded: 1940
- Founder: S. S. Vasan
- Defunct: 1994; 32 years ago
- Headquarters: Madras, India
- Area served: Tamil Nadu; Kerala; Bollywood; Andhra Pradesh
- Website: http://geminiindia.in

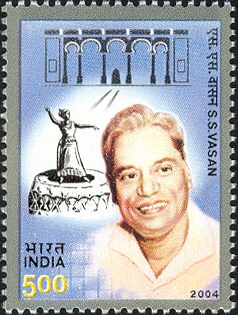
Subramaniam Srinivasan, Proprietor of Gemini Pictures

Gemini Studios was an Indian film studio based in Madras, Tamil Nadu. It was launched when S. S. Vasan, a businessman of many ventures (including the ownership of Ananda Vikatan) bought Motion Picture Producers' Combines from Krishnaswamy Subrahmanyam and renamed it. The studio re-opened under the name Gemini. Despite the common beliefs about a lucky racehorse or the astrological sign of his wife, it was the logo Vasan chose that led to the name. Subrahmanyam had shown him a picture of his very young boys, blowing on toy trumpets in the nude. Vasan chose the pose to craft the logo and hence the name Gemini—The Twins. The new facade also had statues of 'The Gemini Twins', blowing the bugle. Gemini Studios served as a breeding ground for innumerable artists and technicians for the south Indian Film Industry. The Gemini twins became a household symbol and the Gemini flyover was named after the original studio at that junction. Gemini Studios is one of the few producers in Tamil cinema to survive beyond 100 productions along with AVM, Modern Theatres, Thenandal Films, etc.

== Early history ==
S.S.Vasan bought from his friend K. Subramanyam a Film distribution business Motion Picture Producers' Combines studio on Mount Road for Rs.86,427-11-9, the odd figure arrived at through including the interest on unpaid wages of the employees and it was renamed as Gemini Studios in the year 1940. G. Kamble, a painter from Kolhapur worked at the studios in his early life.

== Timeline ==
Year	Film	Language	Director	Music	Notes
1940	Madanakamarajan	Tamil	B. N. Rao	S. Rajeswara Rao & M. D. Parthasarathy	with the arrival of K. Ramnoth, a cameraman and scenarist, and A. K. Sekhar, art director brought many changes in production.
1941	Jeevana Mukthi	Telugu	T. V. Neelakantan	S. Rajeswara Rao	is their first film in Telugu language remake of Bhaktha Chetha (1940) of K. Subramanyam.
1941	Nandanar	Tamil	Murugadasa	S. Rajeswara Rao & M. D. Parthasarathy	starring M. M. Dandapani Desikar and Serukalathur Sama
1942	Mangamma Sapatham	Tamil	Acharya	S. Rajeswara Rao & M. D. Parthasarathy	
1944	Kannamma En Kadhali	Tamil	Kothamangalam Subbu	M. D. Parthasarathy	
1943	Dasi Aparanji	Tamil	B. N. Rao	S. Rajeswara Rao & M. D. Parthasarathy	
1946	Miss Malini	Tamil	Kothamangalam Subbu	S. Rajeswara Rao & P. S. Anandaraman	
1947	Kalpana	Hindi	Uday Shankar	Vishnudas Shirali	This was Uday Shankar's dance spectacular, shot at the studio, that set the trend for future choreographers.
1947	Chandralekha	Tamil	S. S. Vasan	S. Rajeswara Rao & M. D. Parthasarathy	a magnificent movie by S. S. Vasan that was a first for a Tamil to achieve All India distribution and brought excellent returns.
1947	Chandralekha	Hindi	S. S. Vasan	S. Rajeswara Rao & M. D. Parthasarathy	a magnificent movie by S. S. Vasan that was a first for a Tamil to achieve All India distribution and brought excellent returns.
1948	Apoorva Sahodarargal	Tamil	Acharya	S. Rajeswara Rao, M. D. Parthasarathy & R. Vaidyanathan	A 'costume adventure' film in three languages – Tamil, Telugu, Hindi, and a major success.
1948	Nishan	Hindi	Acharya	S. Rajeswara Rao, M. D. Parthasarathy & R. Vaidyanathan	A 'costume adventure' film in three languages – Tamil, Telugu, Hindi, and a major success.
1948	Apoorva Sahodarulu	Telugu	Acharya	S. Rajeswara Rao, M. D. Parthasarathy & R. Vaidyanathan	A 'costume adventure' film in three languages – Tamil, Telugu, Hindi, and a major success.
1951	Moondru Pillaigal	Tamil	R. Nagendra Rao	M. D. Parthasarathy & P. S. Anandaraman	
1951	Mugguru Kodukulu	Telugu	R. Nagendra Rao	M. D. Parthasarathy & P. S. Anandaraman	
1952	Avvaiyyar	Tamil	Kothamangalam Subbu	M. D. Parthasarathy, P. S. Anandaraman & Mayavaram Venu	A Tamil film that proved a major box-office hit.
1953	Rajee En Kanmani	Tamil	K. J. Mahadevan	S. Hanumantha Rao	
1953	Rajee Naa Pranam	Telugu	K. J. Mahadevan	S. Hanumantha Rao	
1954	Insaniyat	Hindi	S. S. Vasan	C. Ramchandra	film starring Dilip Kumar and Dev Anand.
1957	Vanjikottai Valiban	Tamil	S. S. Vasan	C. Ramchandra	starring Gemini Ganesan, Vyjayanthimala and Padmini.
1957	Raj Tilak	Hindi	S. S. Vasan	C. Ramchandra	starring Gemini Ganesan, Vyjayanthimala and Padmini.
1958	Paigham	Hindi	S. S. Vasan	C. Ramchandra	A Hindi film starring Dilip Kumar, Vyjayanthimala and Raaj Kumar.
1963	Zindagi	Hindi	Ramanand Sagar	Shankar- Jaikishan	A Hindi film starring Rajendra Kumar, Vyjayanthimala and Raaj Kumar.
1965 4	Vaazhkai Padagu	Tamil	C. Srinivasan	Viswanathan–Ramamoorthy	A Tamil film starring Gemini Ganesan, Devika
1965	Motor Sundaram Pillai	Tamil	S. S. Balan	M. S. Viswanathan	This was Sivaji Ganesan's sole film for Gemini Studios. After S. S. Vasan's death, his son S. S. Balasubramanyam took the reins.
1967	Oli Vilakku	Tamil	Tapi Chanakya	M. S. Viswanathan	MGR Film with S. S. Vasan
1968	Manushulu Marali	Telugu	V. Madhusudhana Rao	K. V. Mahadevan	starring Shoban Babu
1969	Samaj Ko Badal Dalo	Hindi	V. Madhusudhana Rao	Ravi	starring Parikshit Sahni, Sharada, Prem Chopra and Pran.
1970	Irulum Oliyum	Tamil	Puttanna Kanagal	K. V. Mahadevan	starring A. V. M. Rajan, Vanisri
1976	Ellorum Nallavare	Tamil	S. S. Balan	V. Kumar	This was a flop and the studio's fortunes declined in the 70s and it was taken over by Anand Cine Services later.

== Aftermath ==
After the studio was abandoned for two decades, the headquarters was demolished and replaced by a luxury hotel called The Park in 2002.
