= Pattinathar (disambiguation) =

Pattinathar was a Saivaite and a Spiritual leader.

Pattinathar may also refer to:

- Pattinathar (1936 film), Tamil film directed by T. C. Vadivelu Nayakar
- Pattinathar (1962 film), Tamil film directed by K. Somu
