= U. R. Jeevarathnam =

- யூ. ஆர். ஜீவரத்தினம்
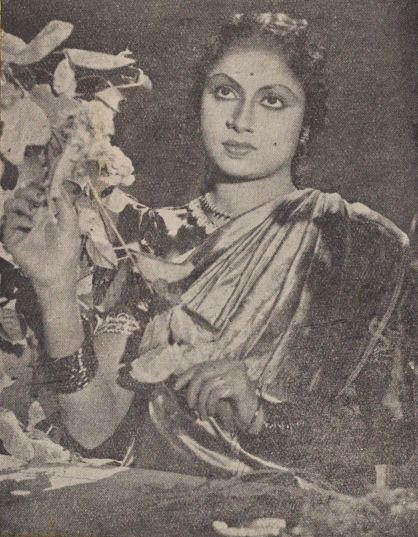
- U. R. Jeevarathnam in 1948 Tamil film Sri Andal
- Born: Unjalur, composite Coimbatore District, Madras Presidency, British India (now in Erode district, Tamil Nadu, India)
- Died: 26 July 2000; Chennai, Tamil Nadu, India
- Occupations: Singer; Actress
- Years active: 1937 – 1956

Unjalur Ramayamma Jeevaratnam was an Indian actress, singer, producer and playback singer. Most of her works are in Telugu and Tamil languages.

== Early life ==
Born in Unjalur, Erode, Madras Presidency in British India to Subramaniam and Kunjammaal. She was very much interested in music right from the time of her school days and could sing very well also. K. S. Angamuthu, a very popular comedian of that time helped her to join the Krishna Drama Company at the age of 9. She had tutelage of carnatic music from Kailasa Bhagavathar and Kunnakudi Venkatarama Iyer. She used to watch the acting style of everyone with attention.

== Career ==
When Salem Modern Theatres was founded, she joined as an artiste. She made her debut through the Modern Theatres maiden film Sathi Ahalya in 1937 at the age of ten. She appeared as a celestial lady from the heaven. She appeared in other films till 1941 when was offered a main role in Bhaktha Gowri. She was a good singer and the song 'Theruvil varaandi' was a testimony to her mellifluous voice.

She had acted in films such as Poompavai, Abhimanyu, Bhojan and Devakanya. In the film Kannagi she had acted as Kaunthi Adigal (An old Jain nun in the Tamil epic Silapathikaram). She was awarded the title Isai Kuyil (Nightingale Of Music) by Swami Dhinakar at the 100th day function of Kannagi held at Thiruvarur. She appeared in many Modern Theatres productions.

After marriage, they started a film production company Mercury Films. The first production was Pona Machan Thirumbi Vanthaan (1954) with Sriram and T. D. Kusalakumari starring. The film earned a moderate profit. The second production was Vaazhvile Oru Naal (1956) with Sivaji Ganesan and G. Varalakshmi starring.

The third attempt was a film titled, Sirikkum Silai with MGR with the expectation of recovering the money that was lost in their previous films, but the production had to be given up within a few days of shooting. They tried a fourth attempt in the film Adichathu Yoham with Ravichandran which unfortunately also had to be shelved in the middle. They incurred heavy losses due to these two films.

She was also a playback singer. She sang for J Sushila and T N Rajalakshmi in Dewan Bahadur (1943), T. D. Kusalakumari in Pona Machan Thirumbi Vanthaan (1954) and G. Varalakshmi in Vaazhvile Oru Naal (1956).

== Personal life ==
She married T. S. Venkataswami who was the manager of Central Studios. After her marriage she bid adieu to the films but she was active in stage dramas. The couple had four daughters and one son, four granddaughters and two grandsons. Her husband died on 7 April 1971. Jeevarathnam died on 26 July 2000 when she was living at Mandaveli, Chennai. Her body was cremated at her native place Unjalur. The entire film industry paid its last respects to this veteran artiste. Her son Vetrivel and his wife Jothi Paappammaa have planned to publish a book on Jeevarathnam's biography. Jeevarathnam's family happily recalls the marriage of Vetrivel which was attended by the then chief minister MGR and V. N. Janaki. MGR handed over the sacred thaali to Vetrivel and blessed the couple.

== Filmography ==
=== Actress ===
Year	Film	Language	Co-Stars	Banner
1937	Sathi Ahalya	Tamil	K. Thavamani Devi, S. D. Subbaiah	Modern Theatres
1937	Padmajothi	Tamil	T. M. Sankaran, M. S. Muthukrishnan	Modern Theatres
1938	Thayumanavar	Tamil	M. M. Dandapani Desikar, M. S. Devasena	Modern Theatres
1939	Manickavasagar	Tamil	M. M. Dandapani Desikar, M. S. Devasena	Modern Theatres
1939	Santhana Devan	Tamil	M. R. Radha, G. M. Basheer	Modern Theatres
1940	Raja Yogam	Tamil	K. Nadarajan, T. K. Sampangki	Modern Theatres
1940	Sathi Mahanantha	Tamil	C. V. V. Panthulu, P. B. Rangachari	Modern Theatres
1940	Uthama Puthiran	Tamil	P. U. Chinnappa	Modern Theatres
1940	Sathyavaani	Tamil	M. R. Radha, K. L. V. Vasantha	Modern Theatres
1940	Parasuramar	Tamil	Serukalathur Sama, K. L. V. Vasantha	Angel Films
1941	Bhaktha Gowri	Tamil	S. D. Subbaiah Bagavathar	Modern Theatres
1942	Kannagi	Tamil	P. U. Chinnappa, P. Kannamba	Jupiter Pictures
1943	Arundhathi	Tamil	C. Honnappa Bhagavathar	Modern Theatres
1943	Devakanya	Tamil	C. Honnappa Bhagavathar	Padma Pictures
1944	Poompaavai	Tamil	K. R. Ramasamy	Leo Films
1944	Jagathalapratapan	Tamil	P. U. Chinnappa	Pakshiraja Films
1944	Rajarajeshwari	Tamil	C. Honnappa Bhagavathar	Modern Theatres
1945	En Magan	Tamil	N. Krishnamurthi	Central Studios
1946	Valmiki	Tamil	C. Honnappa Bhagavathar	Central Studios
1946	Sri Murugan	Tamil	C. Honnappa Bhagavathar, MGR	Jupiter Pictures
1948	Sri Aandal	Tamil	P. S. Govindan, V. A. Chellappa	Salem Surya Films
1948	Abhimanyu	Tamil	S. M. Kumaresan, MGR	Jupiter Pictures

=== Playback singer ===
Year	Film	Song	Language	Actor	Co-singer	Music	Banner
1942	Kannagi		Tamil	M. S. Saroja		S. V. Venkatraman	Jupiter Pictures
1954	Pona Machaan Thirumbi Vandhan	Yaar Inge Maarthavandi	Tamil	T. D. Kusalakumari		C. N. Pandurangan	Mercury Pictures
1954	Pona Machaan Thirumbi Vandhan	Idhayam Ennum Koyil Thannil	Tamil	T. D. Kusalakumari	A. M. Rajah	C. N. Pandurangan	Mercury Pictures
1955	Nam Kuzhandai	Jigu Jigu Digiri Nambaadhe	Tamil			M. D. Parthasarathy	Windsor Productions
1956	Vaazhvile Oru Naal	Thendrale Vaaraayo	Tamil	G. Varalakshmi	T. M. Soundararajan	T. G. Lingappa	Mercury Pictures
1956	Vaazhvile Oru Naal	Then Dhisaikkone Dharma Seemaane	Tamil	G. Varalakshmi		T. G. Lingappa	Mercury Pictures
1956	Vaazhvile Oru Naal	Karunai Seivaaye Kamalakkannaa	Tamil	G. Varalakshmi		T. G. Lingappa	Mercury Pictures

=== Producer ===
- Pona Machaan Thirumbi Vandhan (1954)
- Vaazhvile Oru Naal (1956)
