= Thayumanavar (1938 film) =

1938 film by T. R. Sundaram

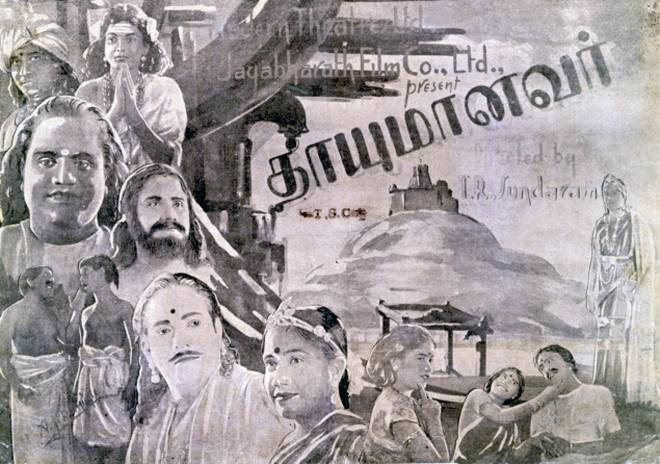
- Film Poster
- Directed by: T. R. Sundaram
- Screenplay by: P. S. Chettiar
- Story by: P. S. Chettiar
- Based on: Life story of Thayumanavar, a Hindu Saint and Philosopher
- Produced by: T. R. Sundaram
- Starring: M. M. Dandapani Desikar; M. S. Devasena
- Cinematography: P. K. Krishna Iyer
- Music by: G. Pichala; Narasimha Rao
- Production company: Jayabharath Film Company Ltd.
- Distributed by: Modern Theatres
- Release date: 31 December 1938 (India)
- Running time: 3 hr 31 mins (19000 ft)
- Country: India
- Language: Tamil

Thayumanavar is a 1938 Indian Tamil-language film produced and directed by T. R. Sundaram. The film brought to screen the life story of 18th-century Hindu saint and philosopher Thayumanavar. Carnatic singer and actor M. M. Dandapani Desikar featured in the title role.

== Plot ==
Muthukrishnan Naiker was the ruler of Thiruchirapalli. He visited the temple at Vedaranyam. The Dharmakartha (trustee) of the temple gave a grand welcome to the ruler. Impressed by the reception, the ruler made the dharmakartha a minister of his court. A son is born to the minister who names him as Thayumanavan. Meanwhile, Muthukrishnan Naiker died and his son came to the throne. He appointed Thayumanavan as his minister. Thayumanavan was brilliant. He helped the king to develop the country. However, Thayumanavan was more inclined towards philosophy and divinity. Soon, the ruler becomes aware of the divine power of Thayumanavan and became a disciple. Thayumanavan performed many miracles, eventually his mortal remains and became a saint.

== Cast ==
The list is adapted from the film's songbook

Male Cast

- M. M. Dandapani Desikar as Thayumanavar
- Vidwan C. S. Selvarathnam Pillai as Kediliyappar
- T. E. Krishnamachariar as 2nd King, Maunaguru
- Prabhat Venkata Rao as First King, Lord Shiva
- P. G. Venkatesan as Yogi, Innocent Husband
- S. N. Sivakozhundhu as Sivachidambaram, Prabhu
- K. Sivaraman as Arulaiyar
- Master Vedhamoorthi as Young Thayumanavan
- Master Krishnamoorthi as Beggar Boy
- N. Ramasami Pillai as Fake Sami
- V. M. Ezhumalai as Fake Sami
- T. V. Devanatha Iyengar as Comedian
- S. L. Venkatanarayana Iyengar as Comedian
- P. Ramasami Udayar as Comedian

Female Cast

- M. S. Devasena as Queen Meenakshi
- B. Saradambal as Gajavalli Madam
- N. S. Rathnambal as Mother Who Lost Her Son
- P. S. Gnanam as Irrational Wife
- K. T. Sakku Bai as Mattuvarkuzhali
- Aparanji as Fake Lords's Teacher
- Devaram Rajammal as Chetty Girl's Mother
- K. Saraswathi as Chetty Girl
- Sakunathala as Personal Friend
- Jeevarathnam as Girl Next Door

Support Cast

R. Somasundaram, K. Ram Singh,
K. P. Lakshmanan, K. Chidambaram, and Devaraj.

== Production ==
During the 1930s many films were made with life stories of religious saints. M. M. Dandapani Desikar who was well trained in Carnatic music and with fluency in religious lore and was the obvious choice of producers. Earlier he featured in similar role in Pattinathar and later in Nandanar.

== Soundtrack ==
Music was composed by G. Pichala Narasimha Rao and lyrics were penned by Papanasam Sivan. The songs were recorded by Sardar Eswara Singh. Most of the songs were compositions of the Saint himself who sang nearly 1500 songs. There were 31 songs in the film most of which were sung by M. M. Dandapani Desikar. Singers are Vidwan C. S. Selvarathnam Pillai, P. G. Venkatesan, Master Vedhamoorthi, Master Krishnamoorthi, N. S. Rathnambal, M. M. Dandapani Desikar, P. S. Gnanam, M. S. Devasena, and the chorus.

Orchestra

- Rajukaru – Dilruba, Sitar, Organ
- T. S. Krishna Pillai – Fiddle
- G. H. Anjaneyalu – Tabla
- K. Rengaiya Naidu – Clarinet
- T. M. Ibrahim – Piano

No	Songs	Singers
1	Om Shankara Purahara Sadhasiva Nin	Chorus
2	Ninnavar Prarandri Niyeyanay Prayer	Vidwan C. S. Selvarathnam Pillai
3	Malarthal Vanangum Adiyar	P. G. Venkatesan
4	Thejonmaya Chandra Shobhitha Bala	Lullaby Music
5	Kailasa Pathiye Saranam	Master Vedhamoorthi
6	Adiyum Nadumutiyum Ilan	Master Krishnamoorthi
7	Evaraiyum Imsai Seyya Lagadugan	Master Vedhamoorthi
8	Nandrudaiyanai Theeyathillanai Narai Velleru	M. M. Dandapani Desikar
9	Undendru Uruthikolvom	M. M. Dandapani Desikar
10	Kana Virumbum Manam Dhanuvin Karunaiye	M. M. Dandapani Desikar
11	Aasaikkor Alavilai	M. M. Dandapani Desikar
12	Penne – Nee Ennaibharati Ullasamaka	N. Ramasami Pillai, V. M. Ezhumalai & Aparanji
13	Ennakoram Iraivanuraiyum	M. M. Dandapani Desikar, Chorus
14	Kanthuka Mathakkariyai Vasama	M. M. Dandapani Desikar
15	Envasamillai En Seiven	M. S. Devasena
16	Pazhan Kadhal Kadhi	P. G. Venkatesan
17	Vaira Manthaiyum Ulluruka	M. S. Devasena & M. M. Dandapani Desikar
18	Enai Unakkintha Pedhai	M. M. Dandapani Desikar
19	Parayo Ennai Mugam	M. M. Dandapani Desikar
20	Udhavikku Oruvarille	P. S. Gnanam
21	Kannadi Nee Kizhicha Kottaiyini	P. G. Venkatesan, P. S. Gnanam
22	Patukindra Bhanuva Lorgal	M. M. Dandapani Desikar
23	Padhini Polave Itharai	M. M. Dandapani Desikar
24	Kalla Lerinthun, Kaivilla Ladithum, Kanimadhura	M. M. Dandapani Desikar
25	Azhuvathin Payanethu	M. M. Dandapani Desikar, N. S. Rathnambal
26	Kali Magamayi Enga Atha Nitha	Chorus
27	Kaka Muravu Kalandhunna	M. M. Dandapani Desikar
28	Ennannu Ennikkitte	P. S. Gnanam, P. G. Venkatesan
29	Saiva Samayame Samayameni Lachamaya	M. M. Dandapani Desikar
30	Veene Azhiyathe Nanba Perinba (Dialogue)	M. M. Dandapani Desikar
31	Chinthaiyeer Thandhaiyay Thayumanavan	P. G. Venkatesan

== Lost film ==
No print of the film is known to exist today.

== Reception ==
Film historian Randor Guy wrote in 2012 that the film is "Remembered for the rich singing of Dandapani Desikar and the scenes featuring holy places."
