= Marlon Klein =

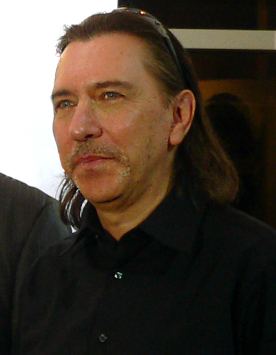

Background information
- Born: 13 December 1957 (age 68)
- Origin: Herford, West Germany
- Genres: World music, fusion
- Occupations: Drummer, producer
- Years active: 1976 to present
- Member of: Dissidenten

Marlon Klein (born 13 December 1957) is a musician and producer in the World Music and Fusion genres. He is a co-founder of the German group Dissidenten.

== Career ==
Klein was born in Herford, West Germany. His musical career started with studies of classical percussion at the Hochschule für Musik Detmold. In the late 1970s he was one of the founders of the Real Ax Band, part of the independent music distributorship Schneeball. Real Ax Band's song "Samba Mortale" became a success in Europe and in Brazilian clubs.

In 1982 Klein co-founded Dissidenten with Uve Müllrich and Friedemann Josch. Together with the American Saxplayer Charlie Mariano and the South Indian Karnataka College of Percussion they gained worldwide attention. Following this project Klein and Dissidenten focussed on North Africa, working in collaboration with Moroccan musician Lem Chaheb. This project produced the album Sahara Elektrik with the song "Fata Morgana".

Klein has collaborated as producer and musician for Pili Pili, Angelique Kidjo, Gary Wright, Sven Väth, Yello, Manickam Yogeswaran and Charlie Mariano.

In the mid-1990s, Marlon Klein was based in Los Angeles, where he produced Gary Wright's album First Signs of Life (1995), featuring a guest appearance by former Beatle George Harrison, and later Wright's album Human Love (1999).

In 2012, Klein and his bandmates of Dissidenten Uve Müllrich and Friedo Josch received the Praetorius Musikpreis Niedersachsen in the category "International Peace Music Prize", awarded by the State of Lower Saxony for the Dissidenten's decades-long work in cultural mediation and the equal blending of musical styles.

Klein worked with Spanish musician Tomás San Miguel as a producer of the album Ten. He also worked with singer-songwriter Esther Bertram on her album Alchemy of the Heart. In 2000, Klein joined singer Manickam Yogeswaran and guitarist Jens Fischer in the project Peace for Paradise. Dissidenten later collaborated with the Moroccan group Jil Jilala on the album Tanger Sessions, released in 2008.

Klein later worked with Win Kowa on Jennifer Kowa's album Stay Strong, released in 2024. In 2025, Klein and Win Kowa released Summertime as Kowa + Klein; the album incorporates previously unreleased vocals by Jennifer Kowa. In 2026, the Real Ax Band released the singles "My Greedy Eyes" and "There Comes a Time", both featuring Klein on drums and credited as produced by him.

Marlon Klein is living in Ibiza and Berlin.

== Main groups and projects ==
- Real Ax Band
- Dissidenten
- Kowa + Klein
- Karnataka College of Percussion
- Lem Chaheb
- Jil Jilala
- Charlie Mariano
- Jasper van’t Hof
- Pili Pili
- Gary Wright
- George Harrison
- Phikelela Sakhula Zulu Choir
- Stephan Eicher
- Manfred Schoof
- Dieter Meier
- Yello
- Sven Väth
- Oliver Lieb
- Tomas San Miguel
- Txalaparta
- Manickam Yogeswaran
- Esther Bertram
- Peace4Paradise
- Angélique Kidjo

== Producer for Record Labels ==
- Sire Records
- WEA Records
- Teldec
- Metronome Records
- Virgin Records
- Jaro Records
- Narada
- Exil
- Nuevos Medios

== Discography ==
Year	Album	Artists	Region	Role
2025	Summertime	Kowa + Klein	Germany	drums, keyboards, vocals, producer
2018	Just Vibrations - Live At The Quartier Latin Berlin	Real Ax Band	Germany	drums, percussion, composer, producer
2016	Where Is Jack	Tony McLoughlin & Marlon Klein	Europe	musician, producer
2014	The Memory of the Waters	Dissidenten & Gordon Sherwood	Europe	contributor
2013	How Long Is Now? Unplugged Live in Berlin	Dissidenten	Germany	contributor
2008	The Tangier Sessions	Dissidenten	Morocco-Germany-Spain	drums, percussion, keyboards, composer, producer
2007	Alchemy Of The Heart	Esther Bertram	Australia-Germany-UK	drums, percussion, composer, producer
2007	Nomad Poets	Spooky Tooth	Germany-US-UK	Live Recording
2006	The Sound Of Blasmusik	Beat'n Blow	Berlin-Germany	percussion, producer
2006	Tudo Em Mim Anda a Mil	Vange Milliet	Brazil	drums, percussion, producer
2005	Never Never Land	Hotlips	Europe	drums, percussion, composer, producer
2005	Dan Txa	Tomas San Miguel	Spain	drums, percussion, producer
2004	Peace for Paradise	Manickam Yogeswaran	Worldwide	drums, percussion, keyboards, composer, producer
2004	ÁGUAS-IGUAIS	Rosanna & Zelia	Germany-Brazil	percussion
2004	Post Scriptum	Pili Pili	Europe	drums, percussion, keyboards, composer, producer
2003	Urban Angel	Esther Bertram	Australia-Germany-UK	percussion, composer, producer
2002	A New Worldbeat Odyssey	Dissidenten	Worldwide	drums, percussion, keyboards, composer, producer
2001	2001: A Worldbeat Odyssey	Dissidenten	Worldwide	drums, percussion, keyboards, composer, producer
2000	Mil e Uma Noites	Arabian Nights	Brazil	musician, producer
2000	Walk Softly Like A Cat	The Real Happy Singers	South Africa	producer
2000	Hommage	Daniel Balavoine and Stephan Eicher	France	drums, programming
1999	Love Letter	Pili Pili feat. Phikelela Sakhula Zulu Choir	Worldwide	drums, percussion, keyboards, composer, producer
1999	Human Love	Gary Wright	US	drums, percussion, keyboards, composer, producer
1998	Live in Europe	Dissidenten feat. Charlie Mariano	Worldwide	drums, percussion, keyboards, composer, producer
1998	Ten	Tomas San Miguel y Txalaparta	Spain	drums, percussion, keyboards, composer, producer
1997	Instinctive Traveler	Dissidenten feat. Bajka	Worldwide	drums, percussion, keyboards, composer, producer
1996	On Earth	Thomas Kessler	Germany	drums, percussion, composer
1996	Tamil Classics	Manickam Yogeswaran	India	producer
1996	Mixed Up Jungle	Dissidenten with Sven Väth, Apacho, Rhythm Ace	Worldwide	drums, percussion, keyboards, composer, producer
1995	Dance Jazz Live 1995	Pili Pili	Germany-Europe	drums, percussion
1995	Shiva Ganga	Dr. Raghavendra & KCP	US-India	producer
1995	First Signs of Life	Gary Wright with George Harrison	US	drums, percussion, keyboards, composer, producer
1994	Boogaloo	Pili Pili feat. Angelique Kidjo	Benin-Netherlands	drums, producer
1993	The Calling	Raphael	US-Maui-Spain	drums, percussion, keyboards, composer, producer
1992	The Jungle Book	Dissidenten	Germany-India	drums, percussion, keyboards, composer, producer
1990	Wild Orchid (Soundtrack)	WEA	—	drums, percussion, keyboards, composer, producer
1989	Out of This World	Dissidenten	Spain-Morocco	drums, percussion, keyboards, composer, producer
1988	Live In New York	Dissidenten	US	drums, percussion, keyboards, composer, producer
1987	Be In Two Minds	Pili Pili feat. Angelique Kidjo	Netherlands-France-Spain	drums, percussion, keyboards, composer, producer
1986	Life At The Pyramids	Dissidenten	France-Spain-Morocco	drums, percussion, keyboards, composer, producer
1986	Jacko-Jacko	Pili Pili feat. Angelique Kidjo	Netherlands-Nigeria-Benin	drums, percussion, keyboards, composer
1985	Arab Shadows	Dissidenten	Morocco-Spain	drums, percussion, keyboards, composer, producer
1984	Bungalow / Bungalow - Exzess Im Bungalow	Pilot Pirx and Dieter Meier (Yello)	Germany	drums, percussion, keyboards, composer, producer
1984	O Cubano	Flucht nach Vorne	Germany	percussion, producer
1983	Sahara Elektrik	Dissidenten	Morocco-Germany	drums, percussion, keyboards, composer, producer
1983	Germanistan Tour	Dissidenten	Europe-India	drums, percussion, keyboards, composer, producer
1982	Wer Spricht?	1. Futurologischer Congress	Germany	drums, percussion, keyboards, composer, producer, founder
1982	Germanistan	Dissidenten	Germany-India	drums, percussion, keyboards, composer, producer, founder
1978	Umsonst und draußen (Festival)	Missus Beastly and the Real Ax Band	Germany	drums, percussion, keyboards, composer
1976	Move Your Ass In Time (rereleased 2000)	Real Ax Band	UK-Germany-Ghana	drums, percussion, keyboards, composer, producer
