= P. Muthukumaraswamy Sarma =

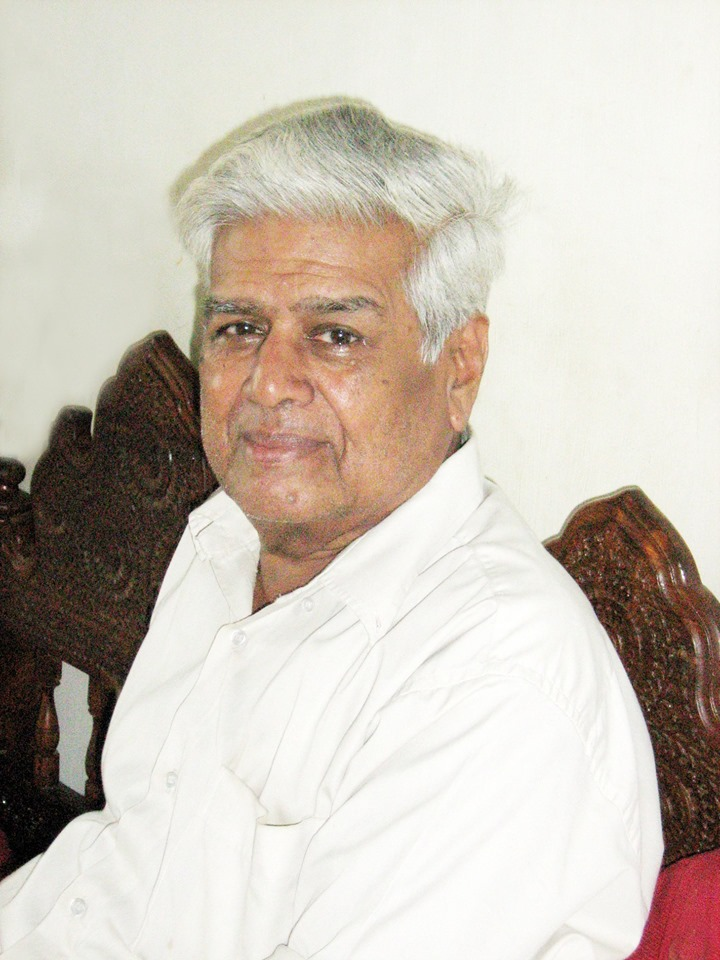
P. Muthukumaraswamy Sarma

P. Muthukumaraswamy Sarma was a Carnatic musician and music educator. He was a prime disciple of Dandapani Desikar at Annamalai University during the 1950s.

== Early life ==
Born in Jaffna, Sri Lanka to Paramasamy Gurukkal and Rathinamma, on 23 August 1932, he lost his father at an early age. After completing his secondary education in Jaffna, he went to India during the late 1950s and joined Annamalai University as a music student. His educator was Dandapani Desikar, an exponent of Tamil Hindu religious hymns and Tamil keerthanas. Muthukumaraswamy followed suit and became an exponent of Tamil songs.

== Musical journey ==
After graduating from Annamalai University, he went back to Yaazhpaanam and got appointed as a music teacher in government owned schools. He taught music to students at various schools in Jaffna.

During the Sri Lankan Civil War, he moved to Chennai in 1986 along with his family. He belonged to a family that had migrated to Jaffna from Kanchipuram.

He performed music concerts in Chennai sabhas and private events. He also taught music, including to Sri Lankan singer Manickam Yogeswaran. Some vocalists, including Sudha Ragunathan learned Tamil kritis from him.

He was a music educator at Annamalai University until the age of 86.

As a disciple of Dandapani Desikar, he arranged thematic kutcheris in sabhas in Chennai to mark Desikar's centenary during the music festival of 2008. He celebrated his guru's remembrance day every year and also popularised Desikar's nine compositions on Madurai Meenakshi Amman.

Singer Sudha Ragunathan is quoted as saying: "Whenever I wanted to learn a special Tamil song, he would be there. I have never seen another musician as generous and as forthcoming in sharing his knowledge."

== Family ==
Muthukumaraswamy Sarma was married to Nalina Ranjani and the couple have four sons - Kalatharan, Artist Pathmavasan, Sarangadharan and Kumaran and a daughter - Geetha.

== Publications ==
He edited and published periodicals titled Isai Aruvi, Kalai Aruvi and Isai Yedu.

== Death ==
Muthukumaraswamy Sarma was ailing for some time due to old age and died, aged 87, on 25 June 2019 at his residence in Kottivakkam, Chennai. His funeral took place in Besant Nagar crematorium on 26 June Wednesday.
