= Sathi Ahalya =

- Directed by: T. R. Sundaram
- Based on: Ahalya by Hindu mythology
- Produced by: T. R. Sundaram
- Starring: K. Thavamani Devi; S. D. Subbaiah
- Music by: R. Balusami
- Production company: Modern Theatres Ltd.
- Release date: 10 March 1937 (India)
- Running time: 2:35:33 (14,000 ft.)
- Country: India
- Language: Tamil

Sathi Ahalya is a 1937 Indian, Tamil language film directed by T. R. Sundaram. The film featured K. Thavamani Devi as Ahalya in her debut role.

== Plot ==
The film depicts the story of Ahalya, wife of Gautama Maharishi, as told in Hindu mythology. Ahalya was turned into a stone by her husband as punishment for she was said to have been unfaithful to him. However, she gets back to her own self when Rama's feet touches the stone.

== Cast ==
Cast according to the film's song book

- K. Thavamani Devi as Ahalikai (Ahalya)
- T. M. Shankar as Indran
- S. D. Subbaiah as Naradar
- S. V. Dhathachar as Gauthamar
- S. N. Sivakozhundu as Vishwamitrar
- T. R. Thulasi Bai as Indrani
- S. L. Venkitanarayana Iyengar as Comedian
- S. S. Sakunthala as Comedian
- Venu Bai, Rathnam, Jeevarathnam.

== Production ==
This is the first film produced by Modern Theatres shot in their own studios. 117 films were made in this studio from 1937 till 1982 including the first full-length Tamil colour film Alibabavum 40 Thirudargalum (1956 film).

== Soundtrack ==
R. Balusami composed the music while the lyrics were penned by Baskaradas
