= Pattinathar (1936 film) =

- Theatrical release poster
- Directed by: T. C. Vadivelu Nayakar
- Written by: T. C. Vadivelu Nayakar
- Produced by: M. T. Rajan
- Starring: M. M. Dandapani Desikar; V. N. Sundaram; D. R. Muthulakshmi; T. K. Rukmini
- Cinematography: K. Ramnoth
- Music by: Gopal Sharma
- Production company: Vel Pictures
- Release date: 1936
- Running time: 5, 485 ft
- Country: India
- Language: Tamil

Pattinathar (தமிழ்: பட்டினத்தார்) is a 1936 Indian Tamil film written and directed by T. C. Vadivelu Nayakar and produced by M. T. Rajan. Gopal Sharma composed the music. The film stars M. M. Dandapani Desikar in his acting debut, playing the titled role with other actors like V. N. Sundaram, D. R. Muthulakshmi, T. K. Rukmini, M. S. Radhabai and P. G. Venkatesan portraying supporting roles. The film was a major success, and ran for 25 weeks and established Desikar as an excellent singer – actor on the ladder of success. Pattinathar is about a saint who lived in Kaveripoompattinam, his devotion to Lord Shiva and the miracles the saint performed.

Pattinathar was a subject made thrice in Tamil Cinema. The first version was made in 1935 by Lotus Pictures with C. S. Sundaramoorthy Odhuvaar as the saint, the second was made in 1936 by Vel Pictures with M. M. Dandapani Desikar (this film) and it was made again in 1962 with T. M. Soundararajan as the saint. In those days, only actors trained in theatre were given roles in films, but occasionally, good musicians were also given opportunities when the film demanded good singing from actors. M. M. Dandapani Desikar, a musician well versed in Thevaram recitals, was picked to play the eponymous hero.

== Plot ==
The film is about Pattinatthar, the saint who lived during 10th Century in Kaveripoompattinam in Tamil Nadu. Lord Shiva, on the report of Dharmavathi about the atrocities committed by men in the world, sends Kubera from Kailas to be born as Thiruvengadar at Kaveripoompattinam. At the age of 20, Thiruvengadar, marries Sivakalai and leads a happy, successful and pious life with her, with the only sorrow that they are childless. Siva Sarama, a poor Brahmin of Thiruvidaimarudur, finds a child under a Bilva tree and presents the child named Marudhavaanan to Thiruvengadar, who offers gold equal to the child's weight to the temple and brings him up as his son. When Marudhavaanan is 16 years old, he goes on a pleasure trip on a boat and encounters a big fish. By his touch, Marudhavaanan ends the curse of the Gandharva (cursed to be the giant fish). Marudhavaanan goes on business voyage with merchandise and returns with only a small box and two bags of sand.

Opening the box, his father Thiruvengadar finds only three cow dung cakes, which he throws away in disgust. To his astonishment, precious stones gleam through the broken cakes and the sand bags hold gold dust. He rushes in to see his son Marudhavaanan (who is Lord Shiva himself), who has disappeared mysteriously, leaving only a small box with his mother Sivakalai. Thiruvengadar finds a Palm-leaf manuscript and a needle without an eyelet. On the script were the following words (in English for understanding):

"Not even an eyeless needle will accompany you in the final journey of life."

On reading the scroll, realisation of eternal truth and teaching of life dawn on him and he renounces all his worldly possessions. Poignant scenes take place on his exit from his house as an ascetic. Thereafter, Thiruvengadar becomes Pattinathar and leads the life of a mendicant living on alms. Meenakshi, his elder sister, feeling that the dignity of her family will suffer by his conduct, decides to kill him by giving him a poisoned Appam (Breakfast pancake). Discovering her plot through divine grace, he throws it on the roof of her house which catches fire immediately. But the miraculous fire is extinguished by him when she begs his pardon and then Pattinathar goes on his way.

He also performs the cremation of his dead mother by placing her on a pyre of plantain stems: by divine grace, it catches fire and her body gets cremated. Thereafter, Pattinathar leaves the city of his birth and wanders from place to place. One night, feeling hungry, he peeps into a hut. The villagers mistakes him for a thief and beat him. Deciding not to beg for alms in future, he goes to a lonely Lord Ganesha's Temple in the jungle and sits behind the Vigragam (God's idol) for meditation. A band of robbers returning from a successful loot of King Badragiri's palace, throw a necklace at the Vigragam as their offering. It accidentally falls on Pattinathar's neck as he is sitting behind the Vigragam. He gets arrested by the King's sentries for having the stolen necklace.

He is taken to the king, who orders his execution on the spike, but the spike catches fire. King Badragiri thereupon abdicates his crown in favour of his son. At his ardent request, Saint Pattinathar accepts the king as a disciple and orders him to report at Thiruvidaimarudur. At Thiruvidaimarudur, Pattinathar and his disciple station themselves at the eastern and the western gates of the temple, till years later Badragiri attains salvation. After visiting various shaivite shrines, Pattinathar comes to Tiruvottiyur at the behest of Lord Shiva. At Tiruvottiyur beach, he requests some Yaadhava children to cover him with a big mud plastered basket. The boys accede to his wish. On opening it, they are stunned to find a Shivalingam (Lord Shiva's image), instead of the sage. Meantime, Sivakalai, Pattinathar's wife sees a vision of him at Tiruvottiyur, about to attain salvation. By divine grace she becomes a bilva tree by the side of the Sivalingam and thereby attains salvation.

== Cast ==
- M. M. Dandapani Desikar as Thiruvenkadar alias Pattinathar
- D. R. Muthulakshmi as Sivakalai
- V. N. Sundaram
- T. K. Rukmini
- M. S. Radhabai
- P. G. Venkatesan
- M. K. Gopala Ayyangar

== Reception ==
The film's message that one should search for the true meaning of life, not waste it in pilling up wealth seemed to have gone deep into the psyche of the film – going public of the 30s and the film become a rage. The impact of the film was so great that it is popularly believed that some young men, even some married men, gave up worldly life and donned saffron robes after seeing the film.

== Box office ==
More than the box office success of running for over 25 weeks, the film brought in a strong social change on the need to find the true meaning of life rather than amassing wealth.

== Soundtrack ==
Music composed by Gopal Sharma and lyrics had the original compositions of the Saint Pattinathar himself and some other songs composed by other saints including Sundarar, Thirugnana Sambandar, Manickavasagar and Vallalar. The film had 52 songs, most of which rendered by M. M. Dandapani Desikar. The songs were great hits and popular among them.

No	Songs	Singers
1	Desam Nilaiyallave	
2	Oru Mada Maadhu	M. M. Dandapani Desikar
3	Irukkum Yedam Thedi	M. M. Dandapani Desikar
4	Vaatililum Thottililum	
5	Kakkum Avare	
6	Paarvathi Naatha	
7	Maanida Thegam	
8	Sarvam Sivamayam	
9	Enna Seyal	
10	Ummai Maranthiduveno	
11	Theruvil Naan	
12	Odhuvaar Thammai	
13	Magalum Thaayum	
14	Annamalayane	
15	Vaadaa Magavane	
16	Kaado Sediyo	

== Bibliography ==
- Dhananjayan, G. (2014). Pride of Tamil Cinema: 1931–2013. Blue Ocean Publishers. OCLC 898765509.

== See also ==
- Pattinathar (1962 film)
