= Jilala =

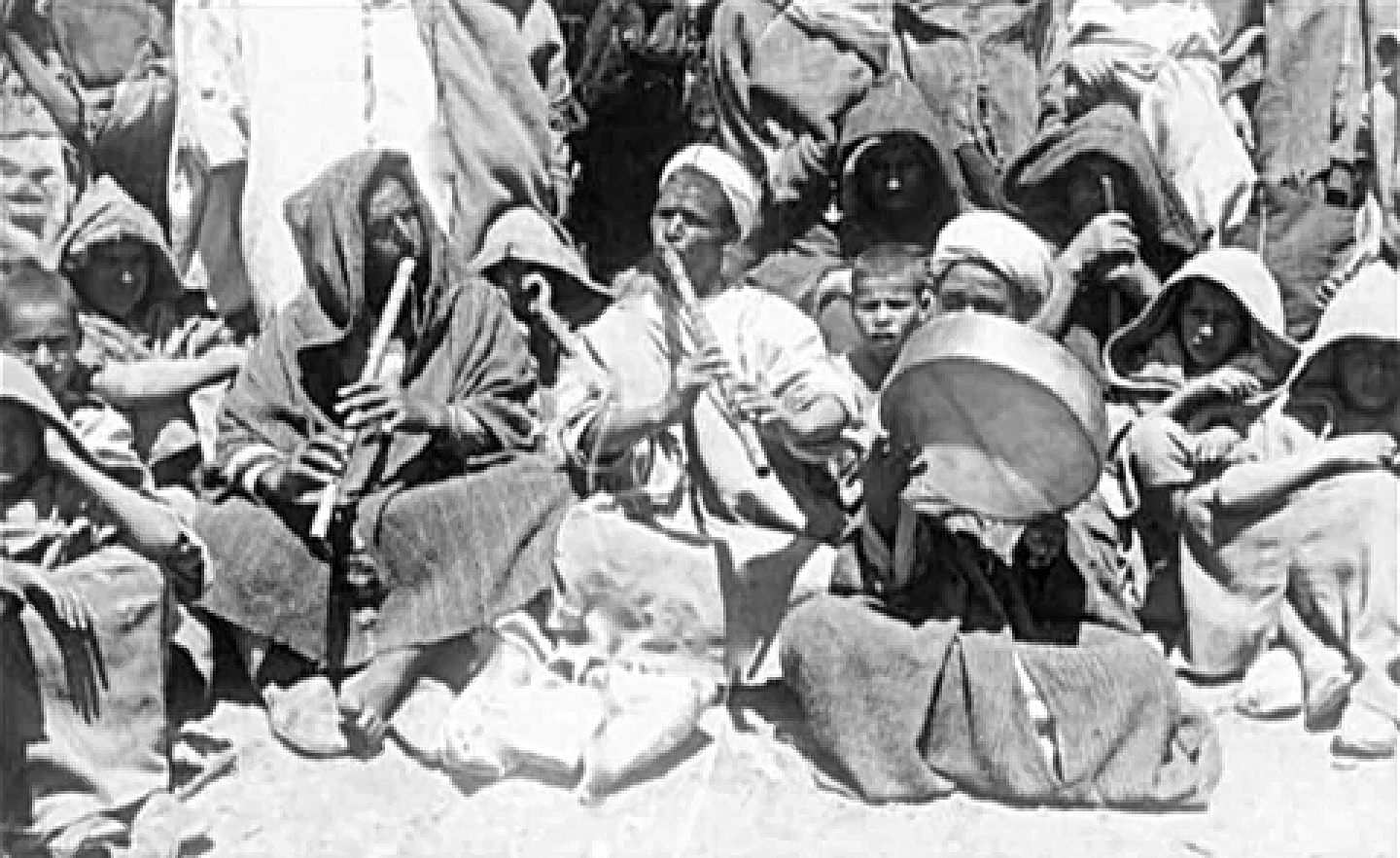
A group of Jilala musicians the beginning of 20th century.

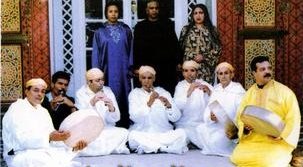
A group of Jilala musicians of the city of Fez in 1994. In the external links are available some recordings of the repertoire of the brotherhood made by Jilala of Fes.

The Jilala (جيلالة), or Tariqa Jilalia (طريقة جيلاﻟﻴـة) is an ecstatic and music-therapeutic tariqa of Morocco of Sufi origin. It should not be confused with the folk revival group Jil Jilala.

The Jilala are the oldest Moroccan Muslim confraternity, named after the Sufi master Abdul Qadir Gilani, in Morocco called Moulay Abdelkader Jilali or Boualam Jilali (Bū 'alam Jilali).

The rituals of Jilala ranging the dhikr and invocation of marabouts and jinns, just like the other trance confraternity of Morocco (Gnawa, Hmadsha and Aissawa).

The Jilala operate in small groups, usually less than five people. The musical instruments they use are the gasba flute (bamboo red flute) and bendir, those using bendir generally are also those who make the invocations and chants. When it comes to songs in honor of a type of spirits called buwwāb (black African jinn, traditionally associated to the Gnawa), some Jilala also use the krakebs, the typical large iron castanets of the Gnawa.

Originally only a voice of sacred Moroccan sufism, and in their early repertoire, besides the invocation of saints and the jinn and the songs of praise of Allah, have a gripe songs of exile and death, and for this reason the musical style of this confraternity is melancholic. The Jilala Jilala music is all about throb and rasp. Throb - the acceleration and deceleration within a song, the breathy organic timbre of the gasba flutes, the in-and-out-of-phase frequencies of the paired flutes. Rasp - flutes, voices, bendirs, all buzzy. The bendir patterns inhabit the 2/4 and 6/8 universes common across Morocco, but I find the drum stroke patterns particularly loopy and provocative.
They are called, behind monetary compensation, upon to exorcise evil spirits, to purify the heart and for curing to heal the sick (in particularly useful in curing cases of hysteria and depression), through the invocation of saints and spirits.

In a ritual Jilala the lila is performed. The therapy or exorcism must be repeated every year in the same period. It is thought that if the therapy is not renewed, the sick or possessed the same symptoms recur at the approach of the date corresponding to the first crisis. In the time that elapses between two lila, however, the symptoms disappear, or, at least, are kept under control.

The participants in the rituals, especially women, falling into a trance (hal), dancing wildly (jadba or jedba) to the rhythm of flutes and bendir. I fell into a trance can have different behavior, such as laughter, screams, cries. The Jilala have spread throughout Morocco (excluding Western Sahara), especially in the north and in the region of the city of Casablanca.

There are similarities between the rituals of Jilala and other therapeutic-Moroccan musical groups with the phenomenon of Italian tarantism, for example the release and wild dance, the fact that the therapy has to be renewed each year, the fact that healers are musicians, and it gives a therapeutic value to the colors, the music and dance.

== See also ==
- Gnawa music
