= Manickavasagar (film) =

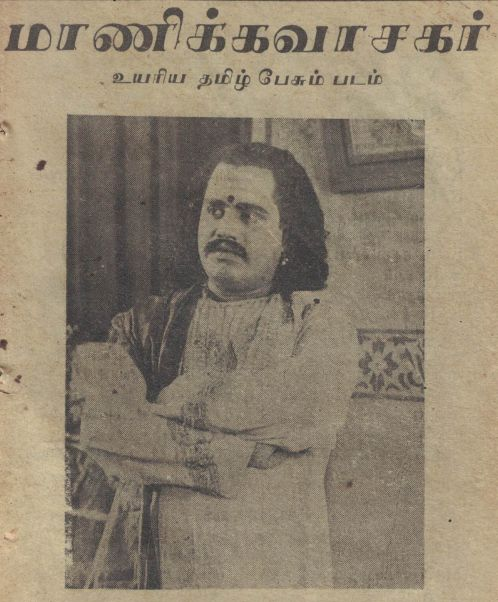
- Directed by: T. R. Sundaram
- Written by: Mayavaram K. Thiyagaraja Desikar
- Based on: Based on the life of Saint Manikkavacakar
- Produced by: V. S. M. Gopalakrishna Iyer
- Starring: M. M. Dandapani Desikar; M. S. Devasena; N. S. Krishnan; T. A. Mathuram
- Cinematography: P. V. Krishna Iyer
- Production company: Salem Sri Krishna Films
- Distributed by: Modern Theatres
- Release date: 1939
- Running time: 211 minutes
- Country: India
- Language: Tamil

Manickavasagar is a 1939 Indian Tamil-language film directed by T. R. Sundaram and was produced by V. S. M. Gopalakrishna Iyer. The film stars M. M. Dandapani Desikar and M. S. Devasena.

== Plot ==
The film depicts the life story of Saint Manikkavacakar.

== Cast ==
The list was compiled from the book Thamizh Cinema Ulagam

Male cast

- M. M. Dandapani Desikar as Manickavasagar
- P. B. Rangachari as Pandiyan
- C. V. V. Panthulu as Lord Shiva
- N. S. Krishnan as Mestri Vengupillai
- S. S. Kokko (Real name: Pasupuleti Srinivasulu Naidu) as Kalimuthu
- T. S. Durairaj as Chithal (Labour Assistant)
- T. V. Devanadha Iyengar as Velayutha Kothan
- K. V. Venkatarama Iyer as Pattar, stammerer
- R. P. Yagneshwara Iyer as Pattar
- P. Ramaiah Sastry as Deekshitar
- Professor Mallaiah as Atheist Minister
- K. R. Sundaresan as Thiruchitrambala Yogi
- S. R. Sami as Minister, Old man
- Sami Sadasivam as Old man
- K. R. Singh as Atheist King
- M. N. S. Parthasarathy as Atheist Minister
- Subramanian as Minister's stableman
- Narayana Singh as Soldier, Labourer
- Saminathan as Soldier
- Venu as Civilian T0m-tom beater
- Mylvagana Iyer as Temple priest
- A. Narasimha Raju
- K. P. Lakshmanan
- N. M. Rajasami Naidu
- Ramalingam

Female cast

- M. S. Devasena as Manonmani
- M. N. S. Shantha Devi as Manohari
- T. A. Mathuram as Amrutham
- P. S. Gnanam as Karumbu
- U. R. Jeevaratnam as Dumb woman
- C. T. Rajakantham as Ponnammal
- Seethalakshmi as Deekshitar's wife
- Devaram Rajamma as Vandhi
- Pushpa Rajamani
- P. K. Vanaja
- Aandaal
- Chellam
- Akilambal

== Production ==
The film was produced by V. S. M. Gopalakrishna Iyer and was directed by T. R. Sundaram. Mayavaram K. Thiyagaraja Desikar wrote the screenplay and dialogues. Cinematography was handled by P. V. Krishna Iyer and audiography was done by Sardar Eswara Singh. The film was shot and processed at Modern Theatres, Salem.

== Soundtrack ==
Some of the hymns sung by Saint Manickavasagar was included in the film. Mayavaram K. Thiyagaraja Desikar wrote the lyrics for the other songs. No music director was credited but the names of instrumentalists are credited.

Orchestra

- G. Rajagopal Naidu - Fiddle (Violin)
- C. Rangasami - Harmonium
- K. Ambigadas - Tabla
- B. Rangaiya Naidu - Clarinet
- C. Ramachandran - Piano, Dilruba

List of songs (Manickavasagar hymns)

No.	Song	Singer/s	Ragam	Duration (m:ss)
1	Namachivaaya Vaazhga		Bhoopalam	
2	Mukthineri Ariyaadha	M. M. Dandapani Desikar	Devagandhari	
3	Utraarai Yaan Venden	M. M. Dandapani Desikar	Sahana	
4	Ammaiye Appa Oppilaa	M. M. Dandapani Desikar		
5	Thiruvalar Thamarai	M. M. Dandapani Desikar	Biyakadai	
6	Valaindhadhu Villu		Malgosh	

- Thiruvalar Thamarai is from Thirukovaiyar; others are Thiruvasagam

Songs penned by K. Thiyagaraja Desikar

No.	Song	Singer/s	Ragam	Duration (m:ss)
1	Thiruvarul Purivaye	Group	Kalyani	
2	Vaadhavooranpaa		Sankarabharanam	
3	Maamarathile Poo		Themmangu	
4	Kattikarumbe		Themmangu	
5	Kaariyathai Nee Mudithu		Themmangu	
6	Aalavaayamar Adhiye Deva	P. B. Rangachari	Kambodhi	
7	Maanidap Pethai	M. M. Dandapani Desikar; P. B. Rangachari	Ragamaliga	
8	Aasai Mannaa	C. V. V. Panthulu		
9	Kooliyaal Velai Seyya	C. V. V. Panthulu	Sindhu Bairavi	
10	Inneram Velai Seydhathu Podhum	C. V. V. Panthulu		
11	Adimai Konde Yenai	M. M. Dandapani Desikar	Poorvi Kalyani	
12	Adikkadi Yenai Edhirthu	M. M. Dandapani Desikar		
13	Ini Enakkethu Vichaaram	M. M. Dandapani Desikar	Mohanam	
14	Vendaam Vendaam Vedhanai	M. M. Dandapani Desikar	Abhogi	03:26
15	Deva Deva Moova Mudhale	M. M. Dandapani Desikar	Hindustani Mukhari	
16	Utraarai Yaan Venden	M. M. Dandapani Desikar	Sahana	03:10
17	Kannatti Namba Nalla Jodi			
18	Nambadhe Nambadhe		Senjurutti	
