= Naan Vanangum Deivam =

- Poster
- Directed by: K. Somu
- Screenplay by: Ra. Venkadachalam
- Based on: Frankenstein by Mary Shelley
- Produced by: C. T. Chettiyar
- Starring: Sivaji Ganesan; Padmini; T. R. Ramachandran; V. Nagayya
- Cinematography: H. S. Venu
- Edited by: N. M. Shankar
- Music by: K. V. Mahadevan
- Production company: Sathya Narayana Pictures
- Release date: 12 April 1963
- Running time: 154 mins
- Country: India
- Language: Tamil

Naan Vanangum Deivam (transl. The deity which I worship) is a 1963 Indian Tamil language family drama film with elements of horror, directed by K. Somu and produced by C. T. Chettiar. The film stars Sivaji Ganesan, Padmini, T. R. Ramachandran and V. Nagayya. It is based on Mary Shelley's famous novel Frankenstein. The film was released on 12 April 1963.

== Cast ==
- Sivaji Ganesan as Sundaram
- Padmini as Rukmani
- T. R. Ramachandran as Gopal
- Ragini as Leela
- V. Nagayya as Dr. Ragunath
- K. Sarangapani as Chokku Pillai
- P. D. Sambantham as Sukkuthanni Pillai
- M. R. Santhanam as Arisi Kadai Mudalali Azhagu Pillai
- S. Ramarao as Pithambaram
- Nagesh as Nagu
- Kumari Kamala as Dancer
- C. I. D. Sakunthala as Small Role
- Karuppu Subbiah as Small Role

== Production ==
Naan Vanangum Deivam is the first film where Ganesan and Nagesh acted together.

== Soundtrack ==
The music was composed by K. V. Mahadevan, while lyrics were written by A. Maruthakasi & K. S. Gopalakrishnan. The song "Mullaippoo Manakkudu" was initially meant to be picturised on Ganesan, but after distributors objected, it was instead used for another actor.

| Song | Singers | Length |
|---|---|---|
| "Ellam Ingoru Soodhattam" | P. B. Sreenivas | 02:30 |
| "Kanavum Palithadhu" | P. Susheela | 03:10 |
| "Mullai Poo Manakkuthu" | A. L. Raghavan & Jikki | 03:29 |
| "Naan Maraven Murali Gopala" | M. S. Rajeswari | 01:24 |
| "Velli Panam Kaasu" | Jikki | 02:36 |
| "Thayavu Illaiyo Annaiyae" | R. Balasaraswathi Devi | 03:19 |
| "Vanthaalum Vanthaalae Vandu Polae" | K. Jamuna Rani | 03:26 |
| "Naagareegamaai Vaazhanum" | K. Jamuna Rani & L. R. Eswari | 06:46 |
| "Veenaana Jaalangal Nee Seivathenadi" | K. Jamuna Rani, A. G. Rathnamala & L. R. Eswari | 03:04 |
