= Dissidenten =

German rock band

- Origin: Berlin, Germany
- Genre: World music
- Years active: 1981–present
- Label: EXIL MUSIK
- Members: Friedo Josch; Uve Müllrich; Marlon Klein
- Past members: Michael Wehmeyer; Hamid Baroudi; Houssaine Kili
- Website: https://www.dissidenten.com

Dissidenten are a German world music and indie rock band formed in 1980, consisting of founding members Uwe "Uve" Müllrich, Friedemann "Friedo" Josch, and Marlon Klein, who joined in 1981. The group gained international recognition particularly for their early collaborations with artists from the Middle East, North Africa, and India.

Their greatest commercial success came with the dance hits Fata Morgana (from the 1984 album Sahara Elektrik) and Telephone Arab (from the 1986 album Life at the Pyramids), which achieved high chart positions in Europe and South America, and reached cult status in Brazil as the theme music for popular telenovelas. Their 1992 album The Jungle Book was also an international success, reaching number 2 on the annual World Music Charts Europe in 1993.

The American Rolling Stone magazine described the band as the "Godfathers of World-Beat" due to their pioneering role in fusing Western pop and rock music with traditional Eastern sounds. Musician Paul Simon called them the "true godfathers of ethno-beat." The band's name refers to the term dissident—meaning those who think differently or are in opposition—underlining their musical openness beyond conventional norms.

== History ==
Around 1981, "Embryo's Dissidenten" were founded in India by Friedemann "Friedo" Josch (b 21 July 1952, Mainz, wind instruments, keyboards) and former Embryo band members Uwe "Uve" Müllrich (b 7 December 1947, Rügen, bass, oud, guitar, vocals) and Michael Wehmeyer (keyboards, piano). Still in 1981, Marlon Klein (b 13 December 1957, Herford, drums, perc, keyboards, vocals) replaced Wehmeyer, and the band renamed themselves to Dissidenten. 1982/83, they founded their own record label Exil in Berlin.

Following a one-year tour of Asia, the group decided to stay in India to produce their first album Germanistan, with the help of the Karnataka College of Percussion, female singer R.A. Ramamani and percussionist Ramesh Shotham. The live line-up was joined by Indian pianist Louis Banks and American saxophonist Charlie Mariano. Concerts in Calcutta, Madrid, Casablanca and Stockholm are documented on the live album Germanistan Tour 83.

They then moved on to Morocco to record Sahara Elektrik in 1982 at the Palace of Abdesalam Akaaboune in Tangier with the help of friend Paul Bowles and local sha'abi band Lem Chaheb. The track "Fata Morgana" became a dance hit in Europe (especially Spain and Italy) and Canada, and the group toured worldwide. "Fata Morgana" sold over 1.5 million copies in Brazil after it was used in the telenovela Sassaricando (Rede Globo, 1987), reaching audiences across South America.

In 1986 the Dissidenten moved to Spain, producing Life At The Pyramids and began to receive recognition in the US and UK.

In 1989 they moved back to Morocco, recording Out Of This World with the Royal National Orchestra of Morocco, and other leading North African musicians including Cherif Lamrani and other members of Lem Chaheb. The album was released worldwide and the band toured around the globe to promote it. In 1991, the album Live In New York was released, and the following year The Jungle Book was recorded, weaving recordings of Indian life into dance tracks. Co-founder Uve Müllrich later emphasized that the band's collaborations were never intended to treat non-Western musical traditions as mere exotic decoration for Western pop structures; instead, the group aimed for an organic, equal dialogue between different cultures to consciously transcend cultural boundaries.

In 1995, Klein stayed in the US to work as producer for two albums by singer Gary Wright, featuring George Harrison. In 1996, the group reunited to produce the album Instinctive Traveler, their first album with mostly English-language songs sung by Müllrich's daughter Bajka, which was followed by a tour of international festivals. Two years later they appeared at the Glastonbury festival and released their second live album, Live in Europe.

In 2000, with American composer Gordon Sherwood, video artist Stefanie Seidl and the Bratislava Orchestra under Petr Feranec they created The Memory of the Waters, a "documentary opera" about the River Danube, debut performed at the International Danube Music Festival in the city of Ulm. The following year, they issued an album of remixes, A World Beat Odyssey, which they then performed live with accompanying DJs.

In 2005, the opera "La Memoria de las Aguas" with the choir and orchestra of Pamplona under the direction of conductor Tomás Garrido, was broadcast by the Spanish National Radio at the Navarra Festival. In 2006 the group worked on a new Moroccan project, The Tanger Sessions, with the legendary Moroccan cult group Jil Jilala.

In 2007, Dissidenten toured North Africa with Jil Jilala. Between concerts they worked together in Tangier and Casablanca to complete The Tanger Sessions. Also in 2007, the band composed and arranged the musical program for the final party of Germany's spectacular CREOLE-Award for World Music. French/German TV ARTE and German TV WDR broadcast a lengthy feature about Dissidenten's Moroccan experiences, "The Hippie Trail".

In 2008, The Tanger Sessions was released and they toured Europe and North Africa. The first gig of the tour was broadcast live and online by German National Radio SWR in April 2008. Since summer 2008, Dissidenten & Jil Jilala performed live in Europe and North Africa. 2009 sees them again at various festivals around Europe/Northafrica and North America.

In March 2012, the Lower Saxony Ministry for Science and Culture awarded Dissidenten the Praetorius Music Prize (Praetorius Musikpreis) in the category "International Peace Music Prize".

The band's enduring popularity in South America was revitalized in 2016 when their classic track "Fata Morgana" was selected as the title song for the popular Brazilian TV Globo telenovela Haja Coração, sparking a resurgence on Brazilian dance floors.

Since 2022, Dissidenten have been releasing archival live recordings as part of their ongoing Live Series. The series documents legendary concerts from 1982 to 1988, recorded in cities including Zürich, Berlin, Amsterdam, Rome, Göttingen, Bari, Barcelona, New York and Québec, as well as at various festivals. By 2026, around 50 live recordings have been compiled, with releases continuing on a rolling basis.

In August 2023, the band performed at the Festival BidasoaFolk in Irún, Spain, demonstrating their continued international presence.

In December 2025, the band released Live Series – New York City SOB's (04/1988), a recording of the concert on 26 April 1988 at Club SOBs (Sounds of Brazil) in downtown Manhattan, featuring guest musicians Hamid Baroudi (vocals, percussion), El Houssaine Kili (vocals, percussion, mandolin cello) and Roland Spremberg (keyboards). The concert is considered a key moment in paving the way for the band's later success in Brazil.

In February 2026, Live Series – Québec, Salle Albert-Rousseau (05/1988) followed, documenting a concert recorded on 6 May 1988.

Also in 2026, a restored new version of the 1985 music video for Telephone Arab (Bleu Noir Version 2026) was released.

== Discography ==
=== Albums ===
Year	Title	Label	Notes
1982	Germanistan	Exile/Indigo, Germany	With the Karnataka College of Percussion
1983	Germanistan Tour	Exil, Germany	Live recording with the Karnataka College of Percussion
1984	Sahara Elektrik	Exil Musik, Germany	Further releases: Amok Canada (1986), Materiali Sonori Italy (1987)
1986	Life at the Pyramids	Exil Musik, Germany	Further releases: Dro Spain & Materiali Sonori Italy (1986), Melodie France (1987), Amok Canada (1988)
1986	Sahara Elektrik / Life at the Pyramids	Exil Musik, Germany	CD release; further releases: Globestyle UK (1989), Exil Germany/World (1990)
1986	Arab Shadows	Nuevos Medios, Spain	Further release: Materiali Sonori Italy (1987)
1987	Dissidenten & Lem Chaheb	Mexico	Collaboration with Lem Chaheb
1990	Out of This World	Sire / Warner Bros. World	CD release
1990	Life at the Pyramids	Exil Musik Germany/World	CD release
1991	Live in New York	Exil Musik Germany	CD release, live recording
1992	The Jungle Book	Exile/Indigo	
1992	Germanistan	Exil Germany/World	CD release
1993	The Jungle Book	Exil Germany/World	CD release
1997	Instinctive Traveler	Exile/Indigo	CD release
1998	Live in Europe	Exil/Indigo	CD release, live recording
2005	La memoria de las aguas	Exil	CD release, with Orchestra & Choir Pamplona
2008	Tanger Sessions	Fuego/Exil	CD release, with Jil Jilala
2013	How Long Is Now? Unplugged Live in Berlin	Fuego/Exil	CD release, live recording
2014	The Memory of the Waters (Live at Brucknerfest)	Fuego/Exil	CD release, live recording with Gordon Sherwood
2017	We don't shoot!	Exil	CD release, live recording with Mohamed Mounir
2022	Live Series - Zurich/Fabrik (12/1984)	Fuego	Live recording
2022	Live Series - Berlin/Fabrik (10/1984)	Fuego	Live recording
2022	Live Series - Amsterdam/Melkweg (04/1984)	Fuego	Live recording
2023	Live Series - Rome (05/1985)	Fuego	Live recording
2023	Live Series - Festival San Pedro de Alcantara (1982)	Fuego	Live recording
2024	Live Series - Göttingen (06/1987)	Fuego	Live recording
2024	Live Series - Bari (05/1987)	Fuego	Live recording
2025	Live Series - Barcelona 'Fiesta de la Mercè' (09/1986)	Fuego	Live recording
2025	Live Series - New York City SOB's (04/1988)	Fuego/Exil Musik	Live recording; recorded 26 April 1988 at Club SOBs (Sounds of Brazil), New York City; featuring Hamid Baroudi (vocals, percussion), El Houssaine Kili (vocals, percussion, mandolin cello) and Roland Spremberg (keyboards)
2026	Live Series - Ottawa / Barrymore’s (05/1988)	Fuego/Exil Musik	Live recording; recorded 5 May 1988 at Barrymore’s, Ottawa, Canada; released 24 June 2026
2026	Live Series - Québec, Salle Albert-Rousseau (05/1988)	Fuego/Exil Musik	Live recording; recorded 6 May 1988 at Salle Albert-Rousseau, Québec

=== Compilations and EPs ===
Year	Title	Label	Notes
1985	Casablanca	Exil Musik, Germany	EP
1985	Fata Morgana	Ginger, Spain	EP; further releases: Golden Denia France & Materiali Sonori Spain (1986), Sigem Brazil (1987), l'escargot France (1988)
1986	Special Compilation	Exil, Germany	CD
1986	Inshallah	Ginger, Spain	EP; further release: Materiali Sonori Italy
1987	Hits Collection	Globo, Brazil	
1988	Polo Mix/Album	Ginger, Spain	
1994	Love Supreme Remix	Exil Germany/World	CD
1994	Jungle Book remix	e-que, WEA World	EP
1996	Mixed Up Jungle	Exil/Indigo	
1997	Mixed Up Jungle	Exil Musik, Germany/World	EP
2001	Dissidenten Remix.ed: A Worldbeat Odyssey / 2001: A World Beat Odyssey	Exil/Indigo	CD
2003	Dissidenten Remx.ED 2.0: A New World Odyssey	Exil/Indigo	
2003	2003: A Worldbeat Odyssey	Exil	CD
2022	Live Series - Barcelona/Angel-Casas-TV-Show (11/1985)	Fuego	EP; live recording

=== Soundtracks ===
Year	Title	Label	Notes
1988	Sassaricando	TV Globo, Brazil	"Fata Morgana" on track A7
1989	Wild Orchid	Warner Brothers	
1991	Great Journeys	BBC	
1992	Pankuj Parahar	Louis Banks Bombay	
1993	Dissidents - Live in India	VOX TV	Live recording
1995	Air India	Air India	
2007	The Hippie Trail	ARTE TV	
2016	Haja Coração	TV Globo, Brazil	"Fata Morgana" as theme for character Fedora (Tatá Werneck); remake of Sassaricando

=== Videoclips ===
Year	Title	Label	Duration	Notes
1985	Telephone Arab - Cairo	Exile Music	3:50	
1985	A Worldbeat Odyssey - Berlin	Exile Music	7:00	
1989	Out of This World	Sire/Warner Bros.	4:15	
1989	Live in New York	Exile Music	45:00	Live recording
1990	20 Minutes from the Life of Dissidents	Exile Music	20:00	
1991	Live at the Pow Wow	Exile Music	5:00	Live recording
1995	Jungle Book Remix	Exile Music	4:00	Remix
2000	The Memory of the Waters - Ulm	Exile Music	10:00	Live at Brucknerfest
2005	La memoria de las aguas - Pamplona	Exil Musik	15:00	
2008	Morock'n Roll	Exile Music	6:00	Collaboration with Jil Jilala
2008	Gun Factory	Exile Music	7:00	Collaboration with Jil Jilala
2009	Truth is the only Religion	Exil Musik	6:00	Collaboration with Jil Jilala
2025	Live Series - Barcelona 'Fiesta de la Mercè' 09/1986	Fuego	61:07	Live recording; recorded 23 September 1986 at Fiesta de la Mercè, Barcelona
2026	Telephone Arab (Bleu Noir Version 2026)	Exil Musik	3:29	Restored new version of the 1985 music video from the album Life at the Pyramids

== Bibliography ==
- Hassler, Harald, ed. (2006). Rock, Pop, Jazz: 800 Bands und Künstler [Rock, Pop, Jazz: 800 Bands and Artists]. metzler kompakt (in German). Stuttgart/Weimar: J. B. Metzler. ISBN 3-476-02171-8.
- Graves, Barry; Schmidt-Joos, Siegfried; Halbscheffel, Bernward (1999). Rocklexikon [Rock Encyclopedia] (in German). Reinbek: Rowohlt.
