= En Magan (1945 film) =

- Theatrical release poster
- Directed by: R. S. Mani
- Screenplay by: A. S. A. Sami
- Based on: Waterloo Bridge by Robert E. Sherwood
- Produced by: S. Narayanan
- Starring: N. Krishnamurthi; U. R. Jeevarathnam; D. Balasubramaniam; Kumari Kamala
- Cinematography: V. Krishnan; K. Durai
- Edited by: S. Surya
- Music by: Papanasam Sivan; C. A. Lakshmana Das
- Production company: Central Studios
- Distributed by: Jupiter Pictures
- Release date: 3 November 1945
- Country: India
- Language: Tamil

En Magan (Tamil pronunciation: ['ɛn 'mɐɡɐn]; transl. My Son) is a 1945 Indian Tamil-language romantic war film directed by R. S. Mani and written by A. S. A. Sami. Based on the American play Waterloo Bridge by Robert E. Sherwood, the film stars N. Krishnamoorthi, U. R. Jeevarathnam, D. Balasubramaniam and Kumari Kamala. It was released on 3 November 1945, and was a commercial success. No print of the film is known to survive, making it a lost film.

The film was created as a World War II-related propaganda film, at the request of the government of Tamil Nadu.

== Plot ==
The son of a wealthy man from the countryside arrives in Madras in pursuit of a better education. He falls in love with the daughter of a successful lawyer, but learns that his old-fashioned father is preparing an arranged marriage for him. He protests and his relationship with his father deteriorates. He is unaware that his father's chosen girl is the woman who he has fallen in love with.

The young man feels heartbroken because he can not obtain the woman he loves. He decides to join the Indian Air Force, willing to fight against the Axis powers. He is posted to British Burma, where his airplane is eventually shot down by enemy forces. His lover assumes that he has died, and decides to become a wartime nurse and take care of suffering people.

The young man has actually survived, and is transported to a hospital. The nurse who tends to him is his lover, and the misunderstandings opposing their relationship are cleared. The lovers marry, and the film has a happy ending.

== Cast ==
Male cast

- N. Krishnamurthi as Selvam
- D. Balasubramaniam as Murthy Mudaliar
- N. S. Narayana Pillai as Padmanabhan
- B. Rajagopala iyer as Shivasamy Mudaliar
- Nat Annaji Rao as Astrologer
- P. Rama Iyer Shastri as Murthy's accountant
- T. M. Gopal as Pillai (Worker)
- S. Ramanathan as Ramanathan
- D. V. Narayanasami as Narayanan
- S. R. Krishna Iyengar as I. A. F. Officer, Military Doctor
- K. R. V. Sharma as Venu
- N. Shankaramurthi as Japanese Army Officer
- A. C. Irusappan as Japanese Army Officer

Female cast

- U. R. Jeevarathnam as Vimala
- M. M. Radha Bai as Alamu
- Baby Kamala as Kamala
- C. K. Saraswathi as Kalyani
- C. V. Masilamani as Sarasu
- M. Jayamma as A. N. S. Nurse
- N. R. Meera Bai as A. N. S. Nurse

== Production ==
In 1945, during World War II, the government of Tamil Nadu requested three Tamil film producers to make propaganda films. Central Studios, one of them, decided to make En Magan, an adaptation of the American play Waterloo Bridge by Robert E. Sherwood. R. S. Mani directed the film, and A. S. A. Sami wrote the screenplay. Cinematography was handled by V. Krishnan and K.Durai, and editing by S. Surya. At a time when the length of films was restricted to 11,000 feet (3,400 m), the film's final cut was 10,969 feet (3,343 m).

== Soundtrack ==
Music was composed by Papanasam Sivan and C. A. Lakshmana Das, who together also wrote the lyrics.

Song	Singer	Ragam/Song Tune	Thalam	Length
"Anandam Nan Aginane"	U. R. Jeevarathnam	Mand	Adi	02:37
"Unnaith Dhinam Paninde"	Baby Kamala	Mand	Thishram	
"Kanni Paruvam Madhal Unnai"	U. R. Jeevarathinam, N. Krishnamurthi	Anandabhairavi	Adi	
"Inreru Inbamiga Thirunale"	U. R. Jeevarathinam	Hindi Tune	Adi	
"Niradharavu Anadharavu"	U. R. Jeevarathinam	Bhimpalas	Adi	
"Uyirudan Manrudam Enakum"	U. R. Jeevarathinam, Radio	Panthulavarali	Adi	

== Release ==
En Magan was released on 3 November 1945, Diwali day, and was distributed by Jupiter Pictures. It was a commercial success. No print of the film is known to survive, making it a lost film.
