= Gordon Sherwood =

American classical composer (1929–2013)

Gordon Sherwood (August 25, 1929 – May 2, 2013) was an American classical composer. Known in Germany as the "Beggar-Composer", his works exhibit various early 20th-century European and American classical music styles, as well as showing influences from blues, Arabic, Indian and Asian music. The New York Philharmonic under Dimitri Mitropoulos gave his career a promising start as a prize-winning young composer at Carnegie Hall in 1957. Aaron Copland said he was "his most gifted student". He studied with famous teachers and won more awards and stipends in academia, but drifted into virtual anonymity until the mid-1990s. He began begging on the streets of Paris around 1980. A 1994 Norddeutscher Rundfunk/Arte feature-length television documentary Der Bettler von Paris exposed his life and work to German audiences, who were the first to hear his symphony and other works were premiered and recorded at the beginning of the 21st century.

== Biography ==
Born in Evanston, Illinois to parents who he called "frustrated musicians", Sherwood was one of two children. His father, Emery, had studied music for a few semesters before becoming an accountant. Sherwood and his sister both learned to play piano as small children and showed exceptional talent, but much of his upbringing was outside the home as the parents removed both children from their home during childhood. They put the sister in a psychiatric hospital and sent him to military school. His parents called him a rebel and saw no value in his pursuit of becoming a composer. He changed schools twice after suffering abuse by a principal and fellow cadets.

He studied music at Western Michigan College and earned a Master of Music degree at the University of Michigan in 1955. In 1957 he won the 12th George Gershwin Memorial Award for "Introduction and Allegro", which were composed as the third and fourth movements of his First Symphony, Op. 3. The competition, whose laureates include many of the most successful post-war American composers of classical music such as Peter Mennin (1945) Ned Rorem (1948) and George Rochberg (1953), was judged by notable composers including Samuel Barber, Aaron Copland, Morton Gould, Gian Carlo Menotti and awarded a Carnegie Hall premiere with a one-thousand dollar prize. Sherwood attended the Tanglewood Music Center, where he studied under Copland. A 1959 Fulbright Fellowship and two stipends from the Reemtsma Begabtenförderungswerk financed composition studies with Philipp Jarnach at the Hochschule für Musik und Theater Hamburg, Germany. During a break from his fellowship studies in Hamburg in 1960, Sherwood was arrested for vandalising an Elvis poster in the New York City Subway. According to his autobiography, he worked for a New York City music publisher. Out of frustration with his job, dispatching heavy boxes of sheet music orders that were mostly Elvis Presley's songs, he defaced a poster with red paint and profanity. This was the year in which his supporter, friend and father-figure, Dimitri Mitropoulos died. Sherwood's German girlfriend Ruth, pleaded to the judge for sympathy in consideration of their financial situation and his musical talent, for which she provided a copy of the New York Philharmonic program as proof, and he was let go. Ruth, herself a soprano, subsequently married Sherwood and after three years studying in Hamburg beginning in 1959, they moved to Rome where he studied for another six years. In 1964 he won first prize at the Accademia di Santa Cecilia where his teacher until 1967 was Goffredo Petrassi.

Upon returning to the United States after almost a decade of studies in Europe, Sherwood unsuccessfully solicited offers to teach music at the college and university level and then disappeared from the American and European musical scene, not to be heard from again until the mid-1990s. In 1968 he moved to Beirut and played in a piano bar. Other locations of brief residence included Cairo, Egypt, Israel, and Greece. When they could, he and his wife performed songs including his compositions together as a duo. During this period before 1970, he caught poliomyelitis, was briefly an inpatient in a psychiatric hospital, served several jail sentences and was deported from more than one country. In the 70s, he lived 8 years in Kenya and earned a degree in Swahili language. He continued to compose, with little regard for financial success, social standing or recognition. Support was provided by his parents in spite of their poor relationship to him since childhood. Fellow American composer George Crumb and University of Michigan alumnus also provided him with support.

In 1980 after his parents died, he left his wife in Africa, and traveled in India, Japan and Latin America (mostly Costa Rica). Years later, he found himself stranded and destitute in Paris, where he wrote music in a café while living in a small hotel room and begging on the streets. A 1994 NDR/Arte television documentary entitled Der Bettler von Paris [The Beggar of Paris] brought him some notoriety. He later referred to this practice as "self-sponsorship"; i.e. a means of compensation for his work. He not only put the money from begging towards daily needs, but also saved to finance travels and visits to places where he would seek inspiration for his compositions. His appearance was scraggy, he wore old, worn clothes, had a long beard and messy hair and was gaunt and toothless. He was a Buddhist and vegetarian for the last 40 or more years of his life, hated cars and did not have a driver's license. He recorded the details of this and other events documenting his inspiration, suffering and theoretical ideas in a 2000-page autobiography, which he wrote after the broadcast of Der Bettler von Paris. He spoke many languages including Portuguese, Japanese, Greek and French and learned Russian after beginning his friendship to a Russian pianist in his 70s. As he aged, a network of friends made up of journalists, musicians and artists arranged for him to live in the community of Herzogsägmühle, near Peiting, Germany, where he continued composing. On July 1, 2006, pianist Masha Dimitrieva premiered four of his compositions there.

Sherwood died in Schongau, Bavaria, Germany, after spending the last 8 years of his life in a nursing home in nearby Herzogsägmühle.

== Works ==
The catalogue of Sherwood's works includes almost 150 entries, most of which have never been published or performed. It includes chamber music, works for orchestra, instrumental and vocal music of sacred and secular nature. Noted influences are Igor Stravinsky, Béla Bartók, American tradition, blues and oriental music. The conductor Werner Andreas Albert describes his music as "very catchy, but not in the sense of trivial or easy to comprehend…it is also very complex". In 2000, his Piano Concerto, Op. 107, received its world premiere by piano soloist Masha Dimitrieva and the Bavarian State Youth Symphony Orchestra in Germany. The premiere performance of the complete first symphony, Opus 3, that of which the last two movements were played in the 1957 Carnegie Hall concert was recorded by the Bayerischer Rundfunk in 2002 and released together with Opus 107 and Sinfonietta together as a CD in 2004. Premieres of his compositions were also presented at the museum MARTa Herford, Germany. "Memories of Waters", an oratorio in classical crossover style about the River Danube was co-written with the German world music band Dissidenten. The Philharmonic Orchestra of the Cottbus Theater premiered his Blues Symphony in May 2014. In 2015, his organ works received their world premiere by the German organ soloist Marcel Rode, followed by the performance in the US in 2016. In 2017, Marcel Rode played the organ works at the organ of the Basilica of Our Lady of the Angels, Cartago.

In his testament, Gordon Sherwood entrusted his musical legacy to the Russian-born pianist Masha Dimitrieva, to whom he dedicated his piano concerto, one of the rare compositions of his published on CD during his lifetime by Classic Produktion Osnabrück. At present Masha Dimitrieva is carrying out on her own label “sonus eterna” the complete edition of Sherwood's piano solo works as well, together with the German soprano Felicitas Breest, of his songs.

== Notes ==
=== Sources ===
- Bavarian State Youth Symphony Orchestra past concert programs 2000, 2002
- Duperon, Jean-Yves (2003). "Gordon Sherwood". Classical Music Sentinel.
- Janisch, Heinz (July 7, 2013). "Menschenbilder: Der Bettler von Paris" (radio program). ORF.
- Mannitz, Barbara (2002). "Ein Leben im Kontrapunkt: Porträt des Komponisten Gordon Sherwood" [A Life in Counterpoint: Portrait of the Composer Gordon Sherwood] (in German). Archived from the original on March 14, 2014.
- New York Philharmonic (May 5, 1957). "Concert Program".
