= Gasba music =

North African musical style

Gasba or tamja is a musical style based on a wind instrument of the same name (gasba literally means "reed" in the Berber language), which is widespread in Tunisia, Algeria (among Chawis of north-east Algeria and Oran in the northwest), and in Morocco, (in the eastern Rif (Al Hoceima, Driouch, Nador, Berkane) Oujda, Beni Mathar and Bouarfa and by Jilala brotherhood).

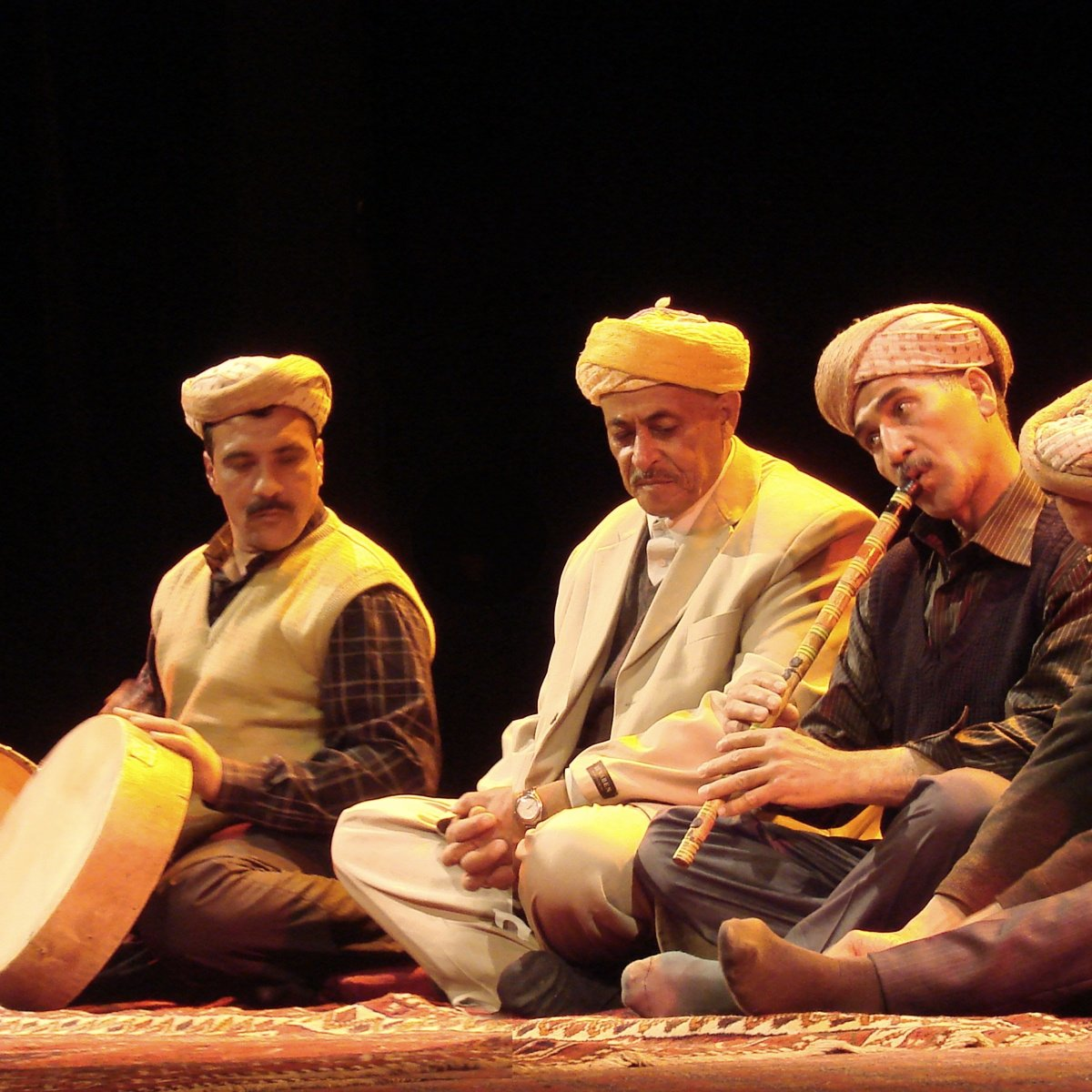
Gasba musicians
