= Devakanya =

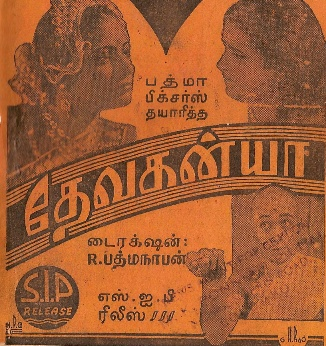
- poster
- Directed by: R. Padmanaban
- Screenplay by: R. Padmanaban
- Story by: R. Padmanaban
- Starring: C. Honnappa Bhagavathar; U. R. Jeevarathinam; T. R. Ramachandran; V. N. Janaki
- Cinematography: T. Marconi
- Music by: Palavangudi V. Shama Iyer
- Production company: Padma Pictures
- Distributed by: South Indian Pictures
- Release date: 16 January 1943 (India)
- Country: India
- Language: Tamil

Devakanya is a 1943 Indian Tamil language Hindu mythological film directed by R. Padmanaban. The film stars C. Honnappa Bhagavathar and U. R. Jeevarathnam.

== Plot ==
The daughter of a king wants to learn some fine arts. The king engages a young man who is the son of a palace courtier to teach music to her. The young man and the princess fall in love, run away to a forest, and start living there. One day an angel from heaven descends on earth and offers a magical fruit to the young man. Then she makes him also an angel and creates a heavenly place for him. The young man goes away with that angel. The abandoned princess goes in search of her husband and joins a group of street gymnasts. But she dies in an accident. Her body is abandoned. The young man sees the body and remembers his wife. With the help of the magic fruit, he brings her back to life. The angel blesses them.

== Cast ==
The list is adapted from the song book

Male cast

- C. Honnappa Bhagavathar as Umapathi
- T. R. Ramachandran as Rangan
- M. R. Saminathan as Gymnast
- M. S. Murugesan as Yaman
- T. V. Sethuraman as Chitraguptan
- E. R. Sahadevan as Suravarman
- Joker Ramudu as Wizard
- V. B. S. Mani as Neethivarman
- M. A. Ganapathi Bhat as Maha Vishnu
- K. P. Jayaraman as Kottapuli
- S. A. Padmanabhan as Paramasivan
- P. B. Srinivasan as Gopu
- Chakrapani Iyengar as Nimithakar

Female cast

- U. R. Jeevathnam as Rathnamala
- V. N. Janaki as Chitraleka
- T. S. Jaya as Sundari
- Kalyani as Gurupathni
- K. S. Angamuthu as Gymnast

Support cast

- Loose Arumugam, Vaidyanatha Sharma, Raja Bala, Kantha, Sulochana, Rajam, Shantha, Padma.

== Production ==
The film was produced and directed by R. Padmanaban under the banner Padma Pictures and was filmed at Pragjyothi Studios, located in Adyar. (This studio was closed soon after the Second World War.) The story and dialogues were written also by R. Padmanaban and were assisted by Sundara Bhagavathar. Cinematography was done by T. Marconi, who was an Italian by birth and was employed by Padmanaban in all his films. Actor Kottapuli Jayaraman earned that nickname after this film only, as the name of the character he featured in was Kottapuli.

== Trivia ==
The cinematographer T. Marconi, being a man from Italy, was detained by the British colonial government during the Second World War as an undesirable alien for merely being an Italian citizen! Randor Guy says he was very fond of the South Indian dish "Morekuzhambu". As such, his friends called him "Morekuzhambu" Marconi!

== Soundtrack ==
Music was composed by Palavangudi V. Shama Iyer, and the lyrics were penned by S. G. Chellappa Iyer, a brother of S. G. Kittappa. C. Honnappa Bhagavathar, U. R. Jeevarathnam, T. R. Ramachandran, T. S. Jaya, V. N. Janaki, and M. S. Murugesan are singers.

No	Song	Singer	Ragam	Thalam	Length(m:ss)
1	"Sangeethame Sarjeevanatha"	C. Honnappa Bhagavathar	Vachaspathi	Adi	02:57
2	"Vasantha Kalamithu Nalame"	V. N. Janaki	Khamas	Rupakam	
3	"Inrunadhu Azhilkanak Kitaidhathu"	V. N. Janaki	Kambhodi	Adi	
4	"Nalungita Vati Penne"	T. R. Ramachandran	Kambhodi	Adi	
5	"Aha Idhe Anandam"	U. R. Jeevarathnam	Hindolam	Adi	02:37
6	"Pankaja Nedhra Param Pavithra"	U. R. Jeevarathnam	Nayaki	Mishra Ekam	
7	"Ulaginayaar Vagudhaare"	C. Honnappa Bhagavathar	Chenchurutti	Adi	03:11
8	"En Manam Kollai Kondai"	C. Honnappa Bhagavathar	Abhogi	Adi	02:54
9	"Shritharan Arul...Mathe Unai Enak"	C. Honnappa Bhagavathar, U. R. Jeevarathnam	Abhogi	Adi	
10	"En Tharumai Singara Va Va"	U. R. Jeevarathnam	Yamunakalyani	Thishra Lagu	
11	"Verilay Vetitha...Parilay Sirantha"	T. R. Ramachandran, T. S. Jaya	Yamunakalyani	Thishra Lagu	
12	"Masila Maniye Mathanarathi"	C. Honnappa Bhagavathar	Kunthalavarali	Adi	
13	"Yarada Budhiya Enan Vegu"	M. S. Murugesan	Atana	Adi	
14	"Buvan Mathi Anta Sarasaram"	T. R. Ramachandran	Mohanam	Adi	
15	"Thayun Dhanthaiyum Neeye"	C. Honnappa Bhagavathar	Mohanam	Adi	

== Reception ==
Film Historian Randor Guy said the film is "remembered for the interesting story line well-narrated on screen by Padmanabhan and the good performances of Honnappa Bhagavathar, Janaki, Jeevarathnam and Ramachandran."
