= Dandapani Desikar =

Indian singer and actor

Madurai Muthaiya Dhandapani Desikar (August 27, 1908 – June 28, 1973) was a Carnatic vocalist, actor and composer.

Famously known as Isai Arasu, Desikar was born to Madurai Muthaiya Desikar and Pappammal in Tiruchengattangudi, near Nannilam in Madras Presidency.

He got training from Manicka Desikar and Kumbakonam Rajamanickam Pillai. He gave his first performance in Tirumarugal. He was a Professor and Head of the Department of Music, Annamalai University for fifteen years. He acted in Tamil films including Nandanar which was produced by S. S. Vasan.

Desikar was one of those singers who performed full-fledged Tirukkural concerts. P. Muthukumaraswamy Sarma was a student of Desikar.

== Music ==
Song	Raagam	Thalam
Adiyenai kattu arulvai angayarkkanni	Kambhoji	T/Triputa-
Akkamume tarum anbai arindidil	Kadaram	Adi
"Thunbam Nergayil" (lyrics by Bharathidasan)	Desh	Adi

== Filmography ==
Film	Year	Role	Director	Producer	Notes
Pattinathar	1937	Pattinathar			Life story of Saint Pattinathar, the copy of this film is not available, except a small portion
Thayumanavar	1938	Thayumanavar	T. R. Sundaram	T. R. Sundaram	Life story of Thayumanavar
Manickavasagar	1939	Manickavasagar	T. R. Sundaram	V. S. M. Gopala Krishnaiyer	Life story of Saint Manickavasagar
Nandanar	1942	Nandanaar	Murugadasa	S.S.Vasan	A bhakti film playing the life of harijan saint Nandanar and immense hit.

== Awards ==
- Sangeetha Kalasikhamani, 1955 by The Indian Fine Arts Society, Chennai
