= Manickam Yogeswaran =

Sri Lankan Tamil musician

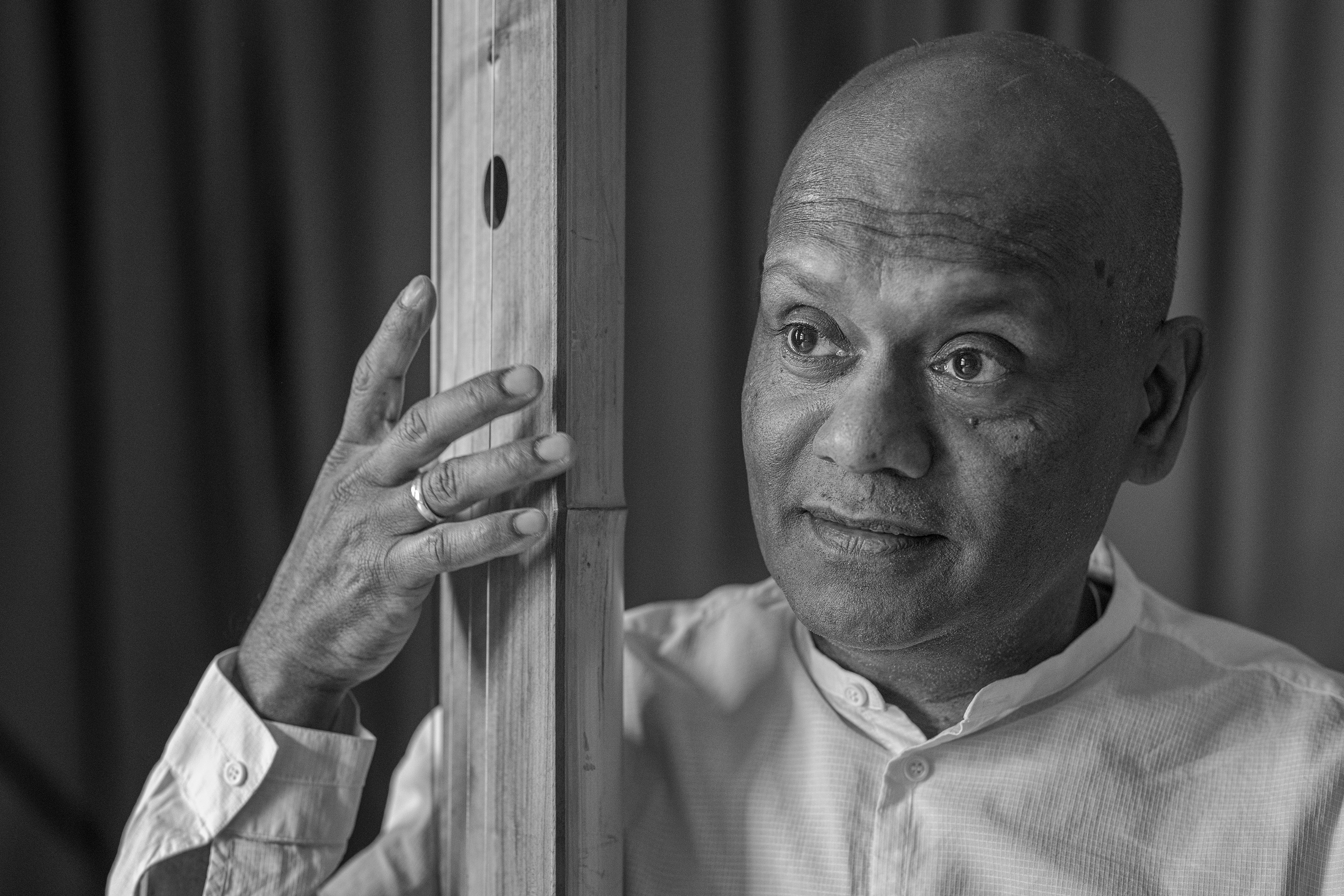
Yogeswaran singing with a tanpura made by Deutz-Klangwerkstatt in Berlin, photographed by Peter Engelke

Maanikkam Yogeswaran is a Sri Lankan Tamil musician and exponent of Carnatic music. He was born 1959 in Meesalai, Sri Lanka, where he attended Jaffna Hindu College before moving to London. He currently lives in Berlin and is co-artistic director of the Global Music Academy.

As a classical singer of Carnatic music, he trained under S. Balasingam and P. Muthukumaraswamy Sarma. His guru was T. V. Gopalakrishnan He has contributed to film scores and dance and theatre companies in and outside the United Kingdom and performed with European classical orchestras. He performed at BBC Proms, the Royal Albert Hall with the BBC Symphony Orchestra, the Bergen Philharmonic Orchestra, Glastonbury, Arts and ideas Festival, Spitalfields, Womad and with Jocelyn Pook for the Queen Elizabeth's Diamond Jubilee.

Besides being a member of the London-based band The Shout, he has performed with the German world music band Dissidenten.

As part of the AIUME educational project, he has brought Indian music to new audiences. The 2008 world conference of ISME in Bologna familiarized educators from different cultures with his approach.

He has sung on the soundtrack to Stanley Kubrick's film Eyes Wide Shut in a piece composed by Jocelyn Pook, thus becoming the first Tamil singer whose work has been featured in a Hollywood movie. He was featured throughout the Spike Lee's film 25th Hour, Sarah Gavron’s film Brick Lane and has recorded the Tamil Thirukkural in 133 different ragas.

Yogeswaran dedicated his 2005 album Peace for Paradise to human rights, peace and reconciliation in Sri Lanka.
