= Pattinathar (1962 film) =

- Theatrical poster
- Directed by: K. Somu
- Written by: Thanjai N. Ramaiah Dass; Akilan
- Starring: T. M. Soundararajan; M. R. Radha
- Cinematography: R. Chitti Babu
- Edited by: E. Dharmalingam
- Music by: G. Ramanathan
- Production company: J. R. Productions
- Release date: 1962
- Running time: 120 minutes
- Country: India
- Language: Tamil

Pattinathar is a 1962 Indian Tamil-language devotional film, directed by K. Somu, and written by Thanjai N. Ramaiah Dass and Akilan. The film stars T. M. Soundararajan, who played the title role and M. R. Radha, who played the antagonist.

== Plot ==
A pious man Sivasarmar, who was down on his luck, had a dream in which Hindu god Shiva tells him about the location of an unattended baby boy. Sivasarmar and his wife were to take that baby to Poompugaar (Kaveripoom pattinam) and offer this baby boy to Thiruvengadar, also called Pattinatthar, (played by T. M. Soundararajan) and receive gold equal to the weight of the baby. The couple then carried the baby to Pattinatthar and his wife Sivakalai (Gemini K. Chandra). Pattinathar also had a similar dream about the baby boy; they then adopted the child and named him Marudhavaanan.

Once, Pattinatthar sent Marudhavaanan for trade overseas on a ship. When the son came back, there was a severe storm and he arrived safely at home. Marudhavaanan's merchant friends from his business trip meet his father & say that they had lost all their goods in the storm at sea, but Marudhavaanan had only brought back sacks full of paddy husks and cow dung cakes. Then Marudhavaanan gives his father just a small box containing three cow dung cakes and palm leaf documents which are loan promissory notes from his friends. The angered father throws the cow dung cakes out, and to his surprise sees there are gold coins and precious gems like diamonds & pearls in them. Thiruvengadar hurries home to see his son.

But Marudhavaanan was not at home and Sivakalai gives Thiruvengadar a very small box, which the son Marudhavaanan had given her, to be handed over to his father, before the son had disappeared. Inside the box, Thiruvengadar sees a palm-leaf manuscript and a needle without an eyelet. On the script were the following words (in English for understanding):

"Not even an eyeless needle will accompany you in the final journey of life."

Then Pattinathar realised the philosophy and wisdom of the words and renounced everything, his wife, his wealth, kith, kin and with only a loincloth he left his home. He began singing many philosophical songs to enlighten people on the blissful state of renunciation.

Thereafter, Thiruvengadar becomes and leads the life of a mendicant relying on alms. Meenakshi (S. D. Subbulakshmi), his sister feels that the dignity of her family will suffer by his conduct, and she decides to kill him by giving him poisoned Appam (Breakfast pancake). Discovering her plot through divine grace, he throws it on the roof of her house, which catches fire immediately. But the miraculous fire is extinguished by him when she begs his pardon and Pattinatthar forgives her & goes on his way. One night, feeling very hungry he peeps into a hut. The villagers mistake him for a thief and beat him.

Then deciding not to beg for alms in future, he goes to a lonely Lord Ganesha Temple in the jungle and sits behind the Vigragam (God's idol) for meditation. A band of robbers returning from a successful loot of King Badragiri's palace throw a pearl necklace at the Vigragam as their offering to God. It accidentally falls on Pattinathar's neck as he is sitting behind the Vigragam. He gets arrested by the king's sentries for having the stolen necklace. He is taken to the king, who orders his execution on the spikes. But the spikes catch fire and burn. King Badragiri gives up all worldly pleasures and abdicates his crown in favour of his son.

At his ardent request, saint Pattinatthar accepts King Badragiri as a disciple and asks him to come to Thiruvidai Marudur temple. At Thiruvidai Marudur, Pattinatthar and his disciples station themselves at the eastern and the western gates of the temple respectively. One day a devotee (Lord Shiva himself disguised) begs for food to Pattinatthar but, the saint replies to the devotee, " I have no food to give for your hunger". Then he told the devotee to go to the western gate where he can find a family man sitting near the temple tower. "You beg to him, may be he can give you some food". The devotee comes to the former king and begs him for food. The former king who became a renunciant is now shocked, to know that he was called a family man just for having a begging bowl and a dog with him. At the very moment, the former king threw the begging bowl away and it accidentally hit the dog, after which it dies. After this incident and several years later, Badragiri attains salvation by thinking of Lord Shiva and surrendering to God's feet.

At that time, Pattinatthar heard the voice (divine voice made without bodily presence) of Lord Shiva, which told him that, where the bottom of sugarcane stalk gives a sweet taste, at that place he will attain his salvation. After visiting various Shaivite shrines, Pattinatthar finally comes to Tiruvottiyur and eats sugarcane and its bottom stalk gives a sweet taste. At Tiruvottiyur beach, he requested some Yadhava children playing in the beach, to cover him with a big mud-plastered basket and to hold it tightly closed. The boys accede to his wish but twice, Pattinatthar got out by using his Siddhis and without opening the basket, while the children were holding it closed and standing guard. The third time, again he sits inside. This third time, the boys closed the basket and grip it very tightly closed. After a while, they open it. They are stunned to find a Shivalingam instead of the sage. In the meantime, Sivakalai, Pattinatthar's wife sees a vision of him at Tiruvottiyur about to attain salvation.

== Cast ==
Male cast

- T. M. Soundararajan as Thiruvengadar
- M. R. Radha as Eshan Chettiar
- K. Natarajan as Badrugiriar
- Serukalathur Sama as Sivasharmar
- S. Ram Rao as Kanaku Pillai
- Sattampillai Venkatraman as Eshan Chettiar's Son
- Sundarrajan as King Chola (Guest appearance)

Female cast

- Gemini K. Chandra as Sivakalai
- S. D. Subbulakshmi as Meenakshi
- S. R. Janaki as Gnanakalai
- C. K. Saraswathi as Visalam
- B. Leelavathi as Badrugiriar's wife

Support cast

- Vairam Krishnamurthi, Gemini G. V. Sharma, C. V. V. Panthulu, S. R. Gopal, Senkottai Gangadharan, G. Muthu, Kalavathi, S. Rukmani, P. A. Pushpamala, Rama & Radhabhai.

== Production ==
Pattinathar is the feature film debut for Major Sundarrajan.

== Soundtrack ==
Music was composed by G. Ramanathan. There are a number of songs composed by the Saint Pattinathar himself included in the film.

Song	Singers	length (m:ss)	Lyrics
"Thiruvenkada Thiruvenkada"	Tiruchi Loganathan		T. K. Sundara Vaathiyaar
"Nilave Nee Intha" (Raga: Lalitha Panjamam)	T. M. Soundararajan & P. Leela	3:29	T. K. Sundara Vaathiyaar
"Thaayum Nee"	T. M. Soundararajan	3:20	T. K. Sundara Vaathiyaar
"Bakthi Kondaduvom"	T. M. Soundararajan	3:04	T. K. Sundara Vaathiyaar
"Kaappathun Paarum Ayya"	T. M. Soundararajan	1:00	T. K. Sundara Vaathiyaar
"Muraiyo Neethiyo"	T. M. Soundararajan	2:43	T. K. Sundara Vaathiyaar
"Enseyalaavathu"	T. M. Soundararajan	2:54	Pattinathar
"Aiyirandu Thingal"	T. M. Soundararajan	3:01	Pattinathar
"Munnai Itta Thee"	T. M. Soundararajan	0:59	Pattinathar
"Ondrendriru"	T. M. Soundararajan	3:23	Pattinathar
"Vaalal Mahavarindu"	T. M. Soundararajan	2:51	Pattinathar
"Oru Mada Maadhu"	T. M. Soundararajan	4:56	Pattinathar
"Kannirunthum"	T. M. Soundararajan	2:40	A. Maruthakasi
"Thanga Bommai"	Soolamangalam Rajalakshmi	4:16	Ku. Ma. Balasubramaniam
"Vakkanai Pesuvathil"	P. Suseela	3:16	Thanjai N. Ramaiah Dass
