= Pattinathar =

Name in the Tamils

Pattinathar (Tamil: பட்டினத்தார், romanized: Paṭṭiṉattār) is a name identified with two different Tamil individuals, one who lived in 10th century AD and another in 14th century AD. Life events of both individuals had merged in folk literature of 19th and 20th centuries. Literally, 'Pattinathar' means, a person residing in a city.

== 10th century Pattinathar ==
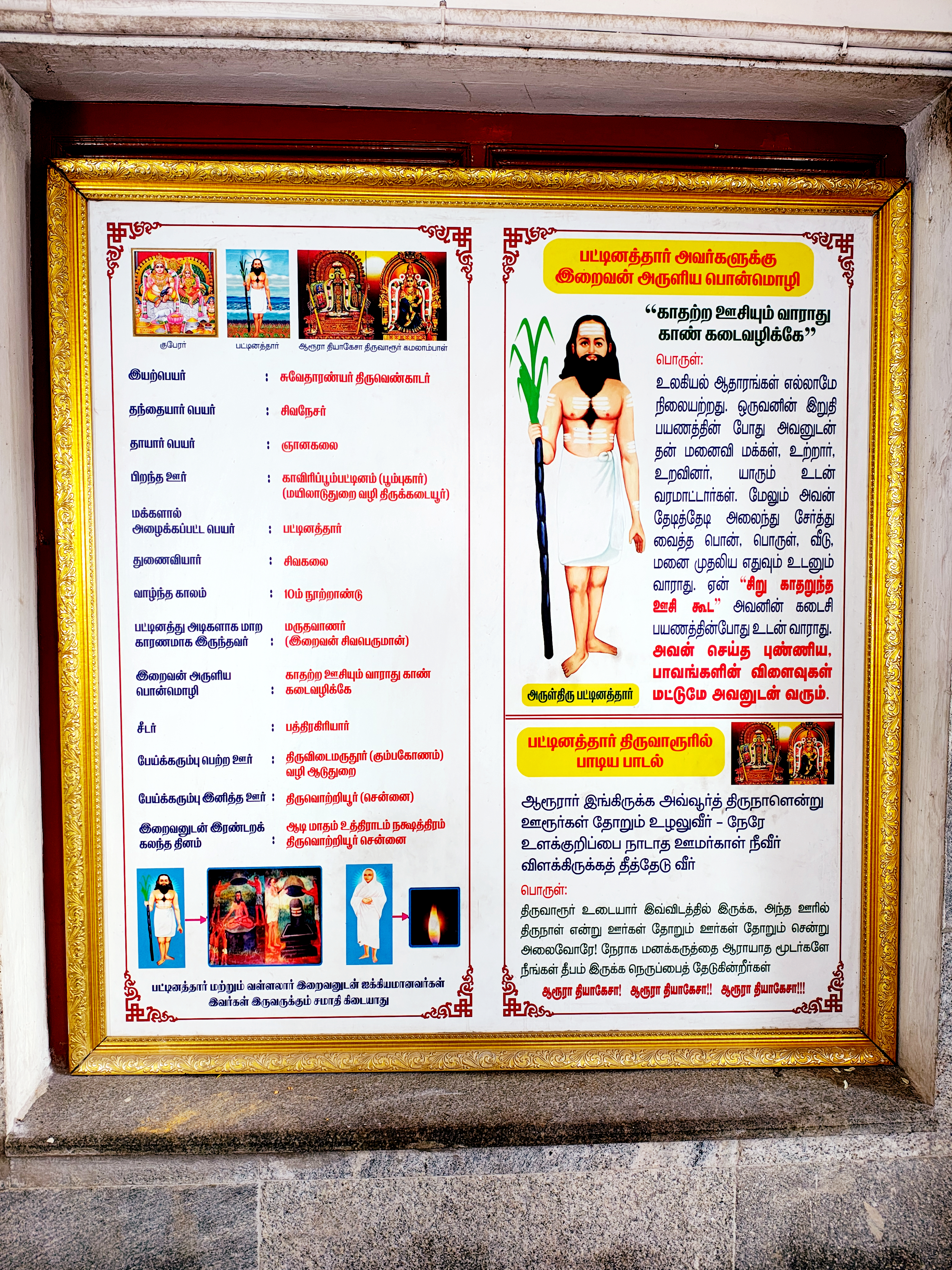
Pattinathar Biography at Tiruvottiyur Pattinathar Temple

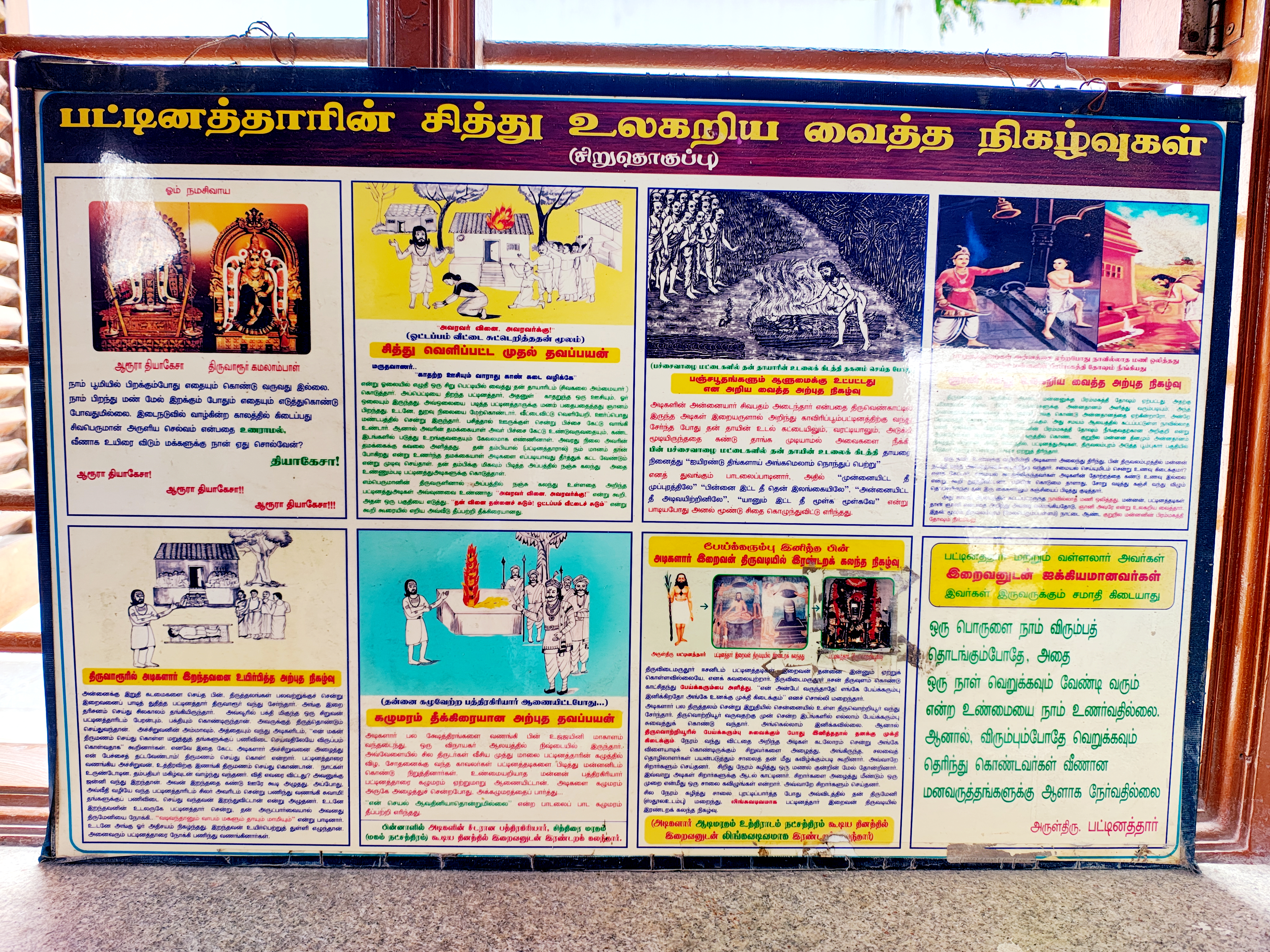
Famous Events in Pattinathar's Life

Pattinathar of the 10th century AD was a poet whose five works are included in the sacred Shaivite canon. Tirumurai.

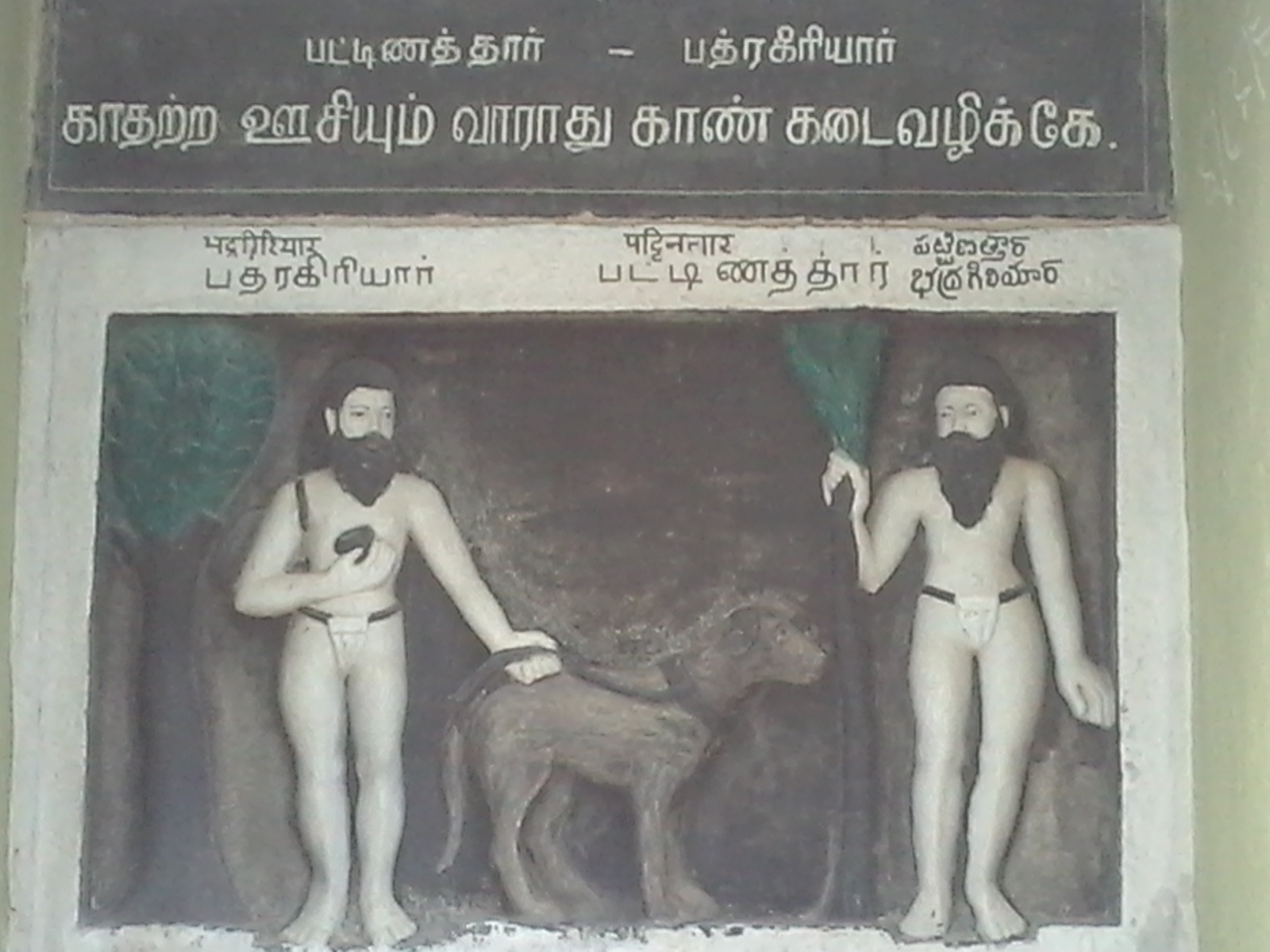
Statues of 14th century Pattinathar and his contemporary Pattirakiriyar, at a temple in Rameswaram, Tamil Nadu.

== 14th century Pattinathar ==
He was born in the port-town Kaveripoompattinam to a wealthy mercantile family, who himself was a merchant before giving up his materialistic way of life. He became the guru and contemporary of another ascetic philosopher, Pattirakiriyar. Pattirakiriyar was a king of Kongu Nadu before becoming a religious mendicant under Pattinathar.

== Search for divinity ==
Pattinathar's son was a divine child. He grew up and followed in his father's (Pattinathar's) footsteps. Once the father sent him on a ship with a good lot of merchandise and when he came he just brought back sacks full of paddy husks. The father was angry and locked him up in a room and after going to the harbor, threw the husks out. He was surprised to see they were all gold; every dried piece of the husk turned out to be gold dust and also had precious gems in the sack. He hurried home to see his son. He was not in the locked room. His wife gave him a small box the son had given before he disappeared. In it was a palm-leaf manuscript and a needle without an eyelet. On the script were the following words (in English for understanding):

"Not even an earless needle will accompany you in the final journey of life."

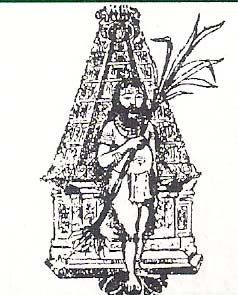
Artistic impression of Pattinathar

Pattinathar (Thiruvengadar) realized the philosophy and wisdom of the words, and renounced everything – his wife, his wealth, his kith and kin and all other mundane attachments. With only a loin cloth he left. He sang many philosophical songs to enlighten people on the blissful state of renunciation. He sang about the human life and its complex dimensions, made his lyrics more appealing to the common man. He urged repeatedly not to be attached to the body and its pleasures, for the body perishes and becomes food for animals and worms. Think of God and surrender at God's feet.

Pattinatthar worshiped Shiva at the Srikalahasti temple, which has inspired great poetic and musical works. The samadhi [attained salvation in this place] of Pattinatthar is a historic landmark located on the Ennore Expressway in Tiruvottiyur. It is believed to be around 500 years to 1100 years old.

Inside the Nandrudayaan Vinayagar temple in Devadhanam, Tiruchirappalli, an idol for Pattinatthar is found.

== Folklore of Bharthari and Pattinathar ==
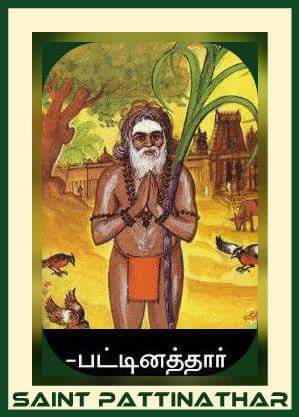
Artistic depiction of Pattinatthaar

Bharthari was the elder son of King Gandharva-Sena, and received the kingdom of Ujjain from the celestial god Indra and the King of Dhara.

When Bharthari was king of 'Ujjayani' (modern day Ujjain) in his state there lived a Brahman who after years of austerities was given the fruit of immortality from the celestial tree of Kalpavriksha. The Brahman presented the same to his monarch, Raja Bharthari, who in turn, passed it on to his love, the beautiful, Pinglah Rani or Ananga Sena (as per Maha Kavi Kalidas), Raja Bhartrhari's last and youngest wife. The queen, being in love with the Head police officer of the state, Mahipaala, presented the fruit to him, who further passed it on to his beloved, Lakha, one of the maids of honour. Eventually, Lakha being in love with the king presented the fruit back to the king. Having completed the circle, the fruit revealed the downsides of infidelity to the king, he summoned the queen and ordered her beheading, and ate the fruit himself. After that he abdicated the throne, to his younger brother Vikramaditya, and became a religious mendicant.

He later became a disciple of Pattinatthar (Swetharanyar is poorvashram name of this saint from Poompuhar, Tamil Nadu) who first indulged in an argument about samsari and sanyasi with king Bhartrhari. Later during the conversation Pattinathar said that all women have 'dual mind' and it might be the true case even with Parameswari. King conveyed this news to rani Pingalah and she ordered Pattinathar to get punished and to sit in 'kalu maram' (Tree, whose top portion would be sharpened like a pencil and whole tree is fully coated with oil, a person who is punished to sit in the top will be split into two pieces), they tried to kill Pattinathar, but kalu maram started burning and nothing happened to Pattinathar, the king received this news and proceeded to Pattinathar and asked him to prepare to die the next day, but Pattinathar replied, "I'm ready right now, to die". The next day king came with tears in his eyes and released saint from jail because he actually noticed queen Pingalah in love with horsemen that night. He relinquished his empire, wealth, even full coat dress and dressed in a simple kovanam (loin cloth), and the king became a disciple of Pattinatthar and got mukthi (salvation) in Tiruvottiyur temple.

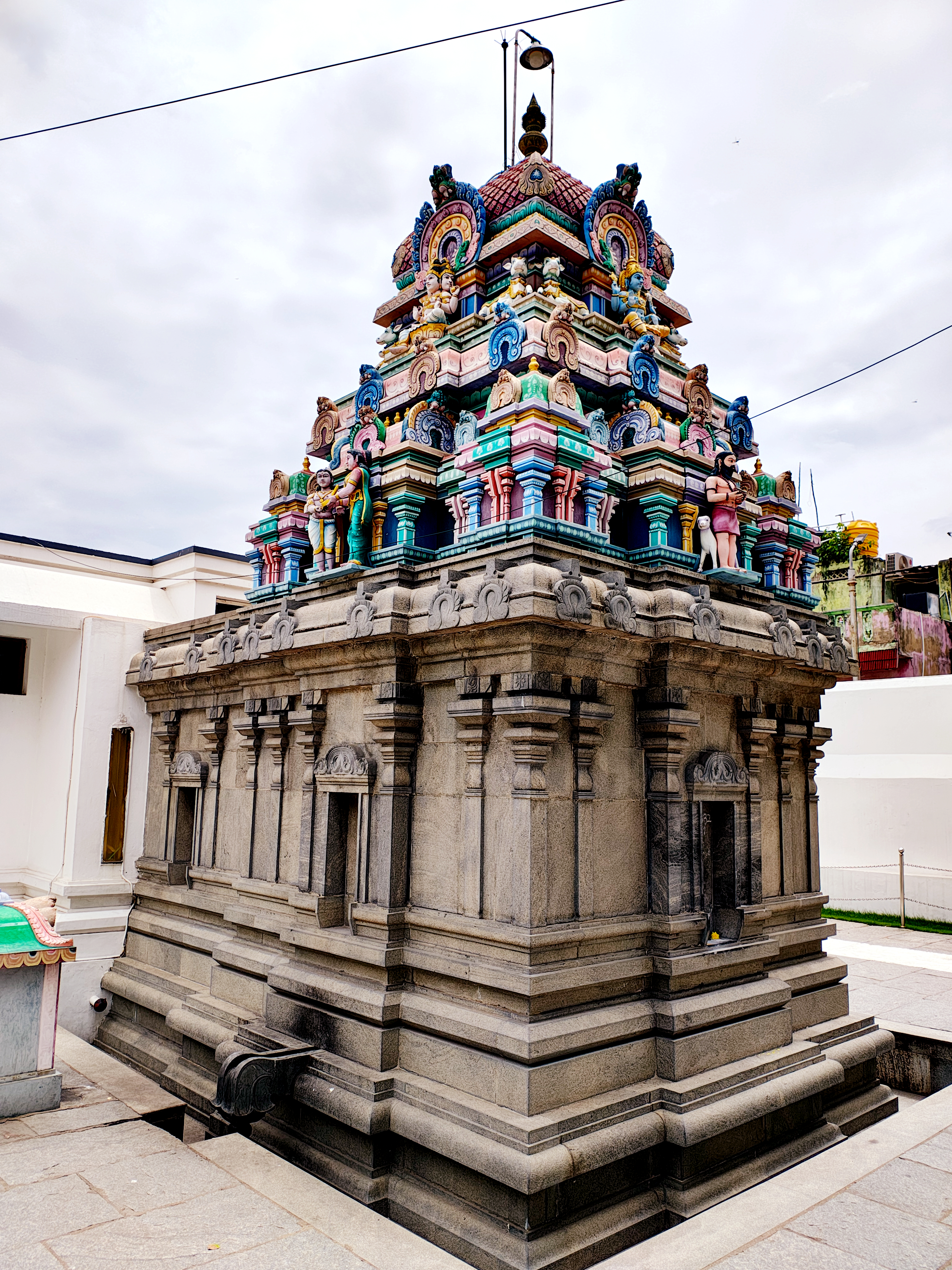
Pattinathar Temple, Tiruvottiyur

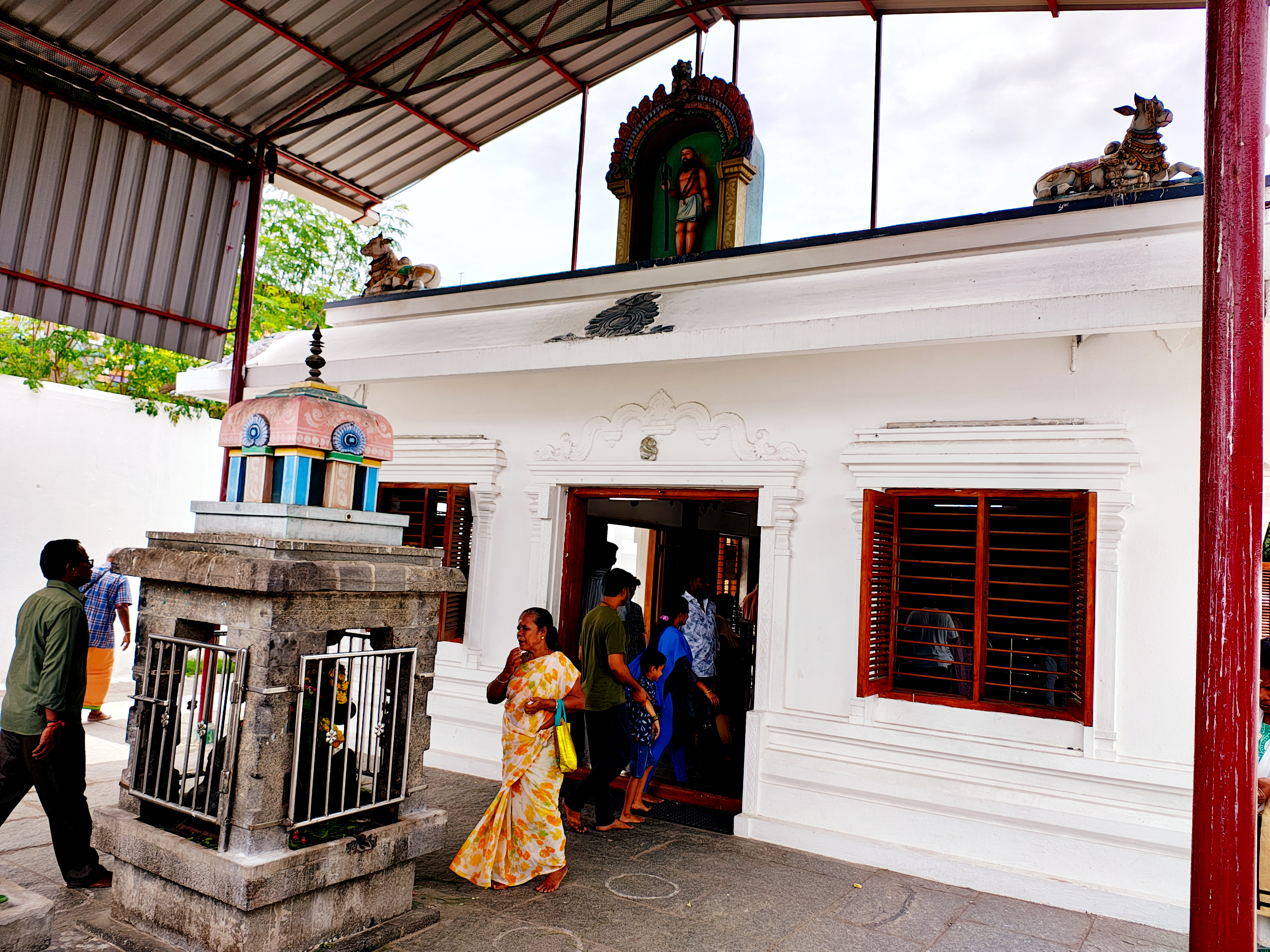
Tiruvottiyur Pattinathar Temple Entrance

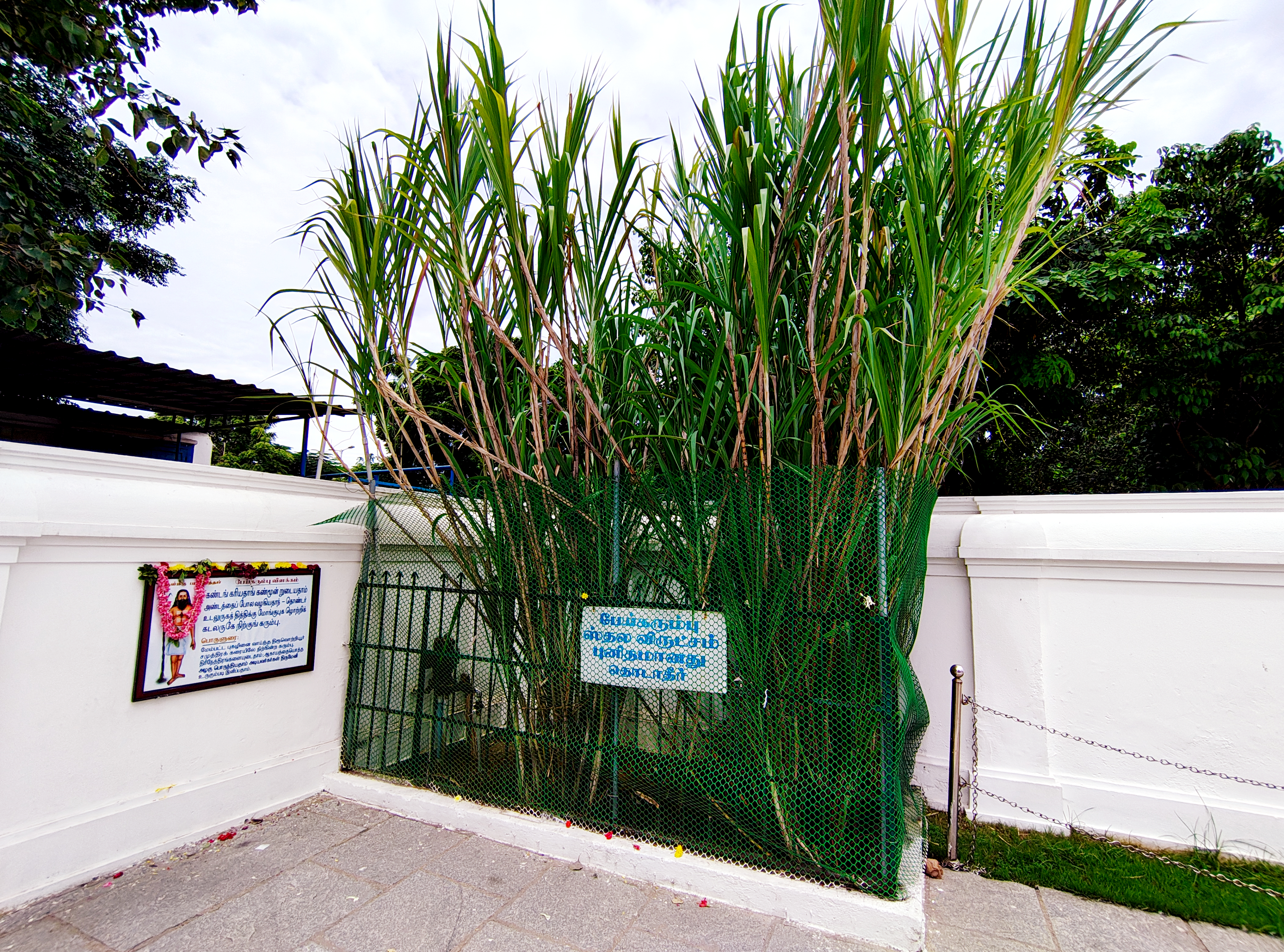
Wild Sugarcane inside Pattinathar Temple, Tiruvottiyur

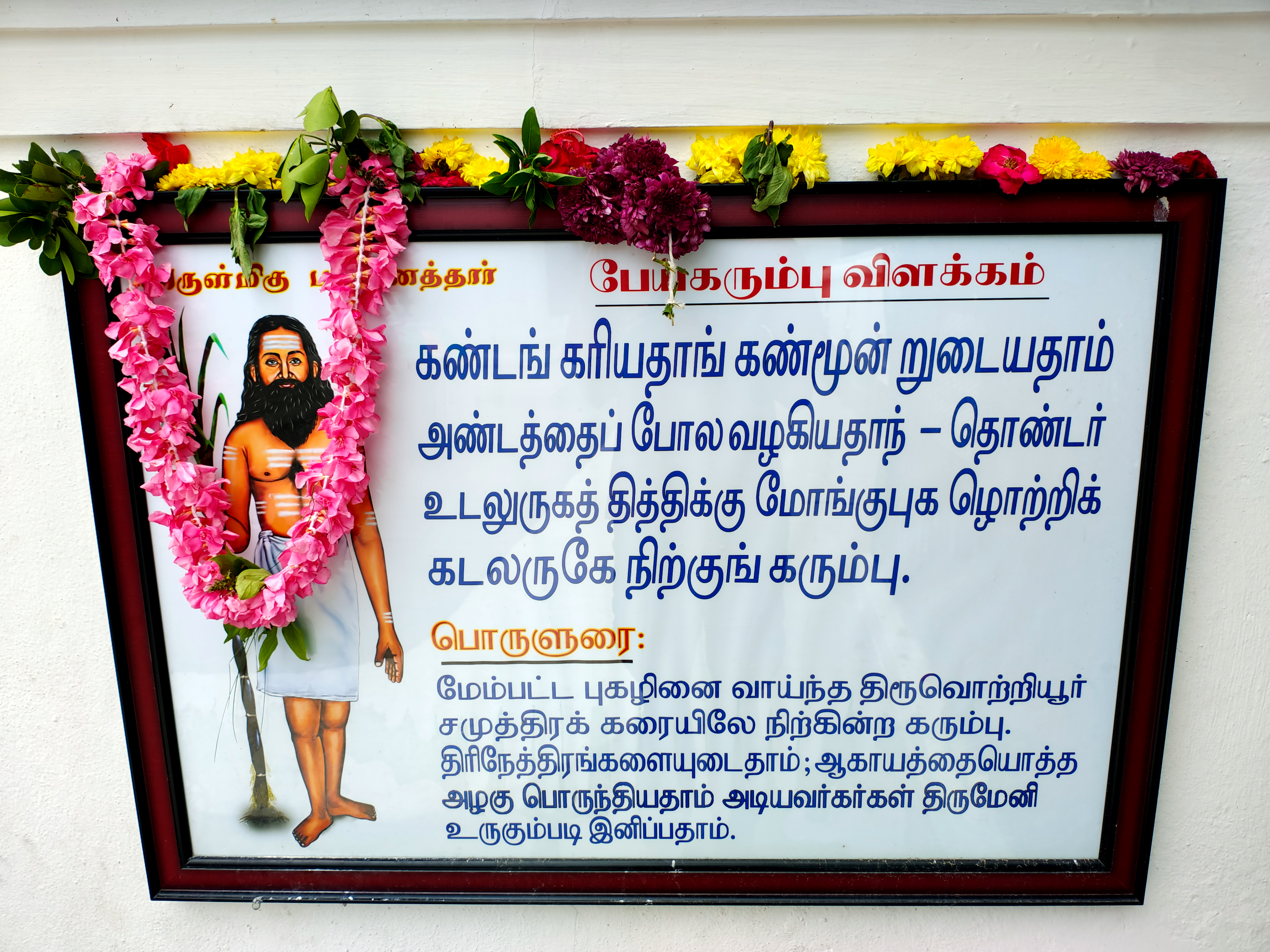
Wild Sugarcane Explanation - Pattinathar Temple, Tiruvottiyur

His Disciple Bharthari, or Bhadhragiri (as he is called in popular Tamil folk culture) wrote a collection of Tamil poetic verses called Meignana Pulambal

== In popular culture ==
In 1935, the film Saint Pattinathar was released, starring C. S. Sundaramurthy Odhuvaar in the title role. In 1962, a later day version came out with T. M. Soundararajan as Pattinatthar.

== See also ==
- Poems of Saint Pattinathar (பட்டினத்தார் பாடல்கள்) - Shaivam Website
- Biography of Saint Pattinathar (பட்டினத்தார் வரலாறு) - Thevaraam Website
- Shaivism
- Nayanars
