= Kothamangalam (disambiguation) =

Kothamangalam may refer to:

- Kothamangalam, Kerala, a town in Ernakulam district, Kerala, India
- Kothamangalam, Sivaganga, a town in Sivaganga district, Tamil Nadu, India
- Kothamangalam Subbu, Tamil author, actor and film director
