= Kannum Kannum Kalanthu =

Song from the 1958 film Vanjikottai Valiban

Song by C. Ramchandra (composer) (and R.Vaidyanathan) and P. Leela, Jikki (singers)

from the album Vanjikottai Valiban
- Released: 1958
- Recorded: 1958; Gemini, Chennai
- Genre: Feature film soundtrack
- Length: 5:32
- Label: Gemini Music
- Composer: C. Ramchandra
- Lyricist: Kothamangalam Subbu
- Producer: C. Ramchandra

"Kannum Kannum Kalanthu" is a Tamil song from the 1958 film Vanjikottai Valiban, directed by S. S. Vasan. The song was composed by C. Ramchandra, and R.Vaidyanathan, lyrics penned by Kothamangalam Subbu and sung by P. Leela and Jikki. The song was remade in Hindi by C. Ramchandra "Aaja To Aaja" from Raj Tilak composed by written by P. L. Santoshi with Asha Bhosle and Sudha Malhotra rendered their voice. The song was picturised at the Gemini Studios at Chennai. The song was well received along with the dance number picturised on Vyjayanthimala and Padmini was a super success.

== Production ==
Both Padmini and Vyjayanthimala, trained classical dancers, vied with each other. They were at the height of their careers and there was professional rivalry between them! Interestingly, the real-life envy did creep into the reel-life dance drama which added its own sugar and spice to the impact of the sequence. [sic]

— Randor Guy

The song is picturised on Vyjayanthimala and Padmini and choreographed by Hiralal, brother of B. Sohanlal and grandfather of Vaibhavi Merchant. During the making it is said that both Vyjayanthimala and Padmini had professional rivalry between them which add to the impact of the song. Vyjayanthimala who is a trained Bharatanatyam dancer was known as "twinkle toes" and was also known as the one who establish dance number in Indian Cinema along with her songs which predated the concept of item number in Indian films. Similarly, Padmini who was also a trained Bharatanatyam dancer, cited as "Natiya Peroli" in Tamil cinema made the song easier to choreograph with minimal shot.

== Legacy ==
The song was well received by audience and critics, where the popularity garnered by the song surpasses the popularity gained by the film. The song was regarded as the best dance sequence in Indian cinema. Along with the song, the catch line used by actor P.S. Veerappa, "Shabhash, sariyana potti!" which means "Bravo, an excellent competition!" during Vyjayanthimala's introduction also became famous and still used by the people of Tamil Nadu.

An attempt at doing a classical version of the dance for this song
