= T. R. Govindachari =

Indian chemist (1915–2001)

- Born: 30 July 1915; Madras, Madras Presidency, British India (now Chennai, Tamil Nadu, India)
- Died: 28 December 2001 (aged 86); Chennai, Tamil Nadu, India
- Education: Presidency College, Chennai; University of Illinois
- Known for: Studies on the synthesis of isoquinolines and phenanthridines
- Father: T. G. Raghavachari
- Awards: 1960 Shanti Swarup Bhatnagar Prize; 1975 INSA Meghanad Saha Medal; 1986 INSA Golden Jubilee Commemoration Medal; 2000 CRSI Lifetime Achievement Award
- Scientific career
- Fields: Natural product chemistry
- Workplaces: Presidency College, Chennai; Ciba-Geigy Research Center; Central Leather Research Institute; Amrutanjan Healthcare; SPIC Science Foundation
- Doctoral advisor: B. B. Dey; Roger Adams
- Doctoral students: Kuppuswamy Nagarajan

Tuticorin Raghavachari Govindachari FNA, FASc (1915–2001), popularly known as TRG, was an Indian natural product chemist, academic, institution builder and the principal of Presidency College, Chennai. He was known for his studies on the synthesis of isoquinolines and phenanthridines and his contributions in elucidating the structure of several plant constituents. He was an elected fellow of the Indian Academy of Sciences and the Indian National Science Academy and was the nominator of Robert Burns Woodward who won the 1965 Nobel Prize in Chemistry. The Council of Scientific and Industrial Research, the apex agency of the Government of India for scientific research, awarded him the Shanti Swarup Bhatnagar Prize for Science and Technology, one of the highest Indian science awards, in 1960, for his contributions to chemical sciences, making him the first recipient of the award in the chemical sciences category.

== Biography ==
Govindachari was born on 30 July 1915 to Tuticorin Raghavachari and his wife Rajalakshmi in Chennai (then known as Madras) in the south Indian state of Tamil Nadu. Graduating from Presidency College, Chennai in chemistry, he continued at the institution for his master's degree for which he studied under B. B. Dey, his topic of research being isoquinolines. After completing his master's degree, he enrolled for PhD, again under D. D. Dey at the same institution, and secured the degree from Madras University while working as an assistant to his guide on a CSIR-funded project for the production of dye and drug intermediates by electrolytic processes. Obtaining a scholarship from the Government of Madras, he went to the US in 1946 and did his post-doctoral studies at the University of Illinois, Urbana under the guidance of Roger Adams, best known for lending his name to Adams's catalyst which was prepared for the first time by him in association with V. Voorhees. Govindachari's stay with Adams lasted three years during which time he assisted the US scientist in column chromatography, collection of fractions and their examination for the latter's investigation of the structures of alkaloids found in the various species of Senecioneae.

In 1949, Govindachari returned to India and in January the next year, he joined Presidency College as an additional professor at the department of chemistry. He served the institution for the next thirteen years during which period, he became a professor in 1952 and the principal of the college in 1961. He superannuated from service in 1962, and after a year, he joined the Research Center of Ciba-Geigy in Mumbai in 1963 as its director. His association with the center continued till 1975 when he returned to Chennai to serve as a consultant to Central Leather Research Institute and after two years, Amrutanjan, a pharmaceutical company, assigned him the responsibility of setting up an R&D facility for them in Chennai. He headed the facility since its inception in 1977 till 1986 when the Science Foundation of Southern Petrochemical Industries Corporation entrusted him the responsibility of establishing a research centre for them. He set up the Centre for Agrochemical Research in 1987 and held its directorship till his last.

Govindachari was married to Rajamani and the couple had three children, T. G. Rajagopalan, T. G. Sundararajan and Anuradha Jagannathan. He died on 28 December 2001, aged 86, at his home town of Chennai, survived by his children; his wife had predeceased him.

== Legacy ==
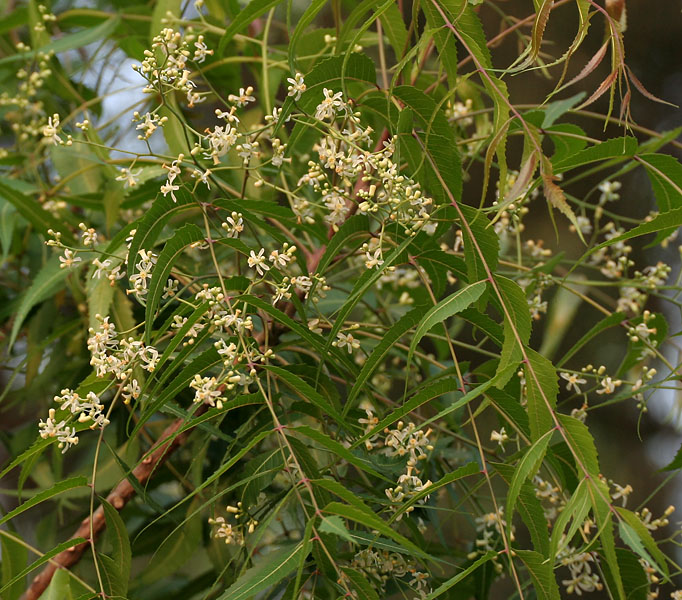
Neem (Azadirachta indica)

It is reported that his involvement with the structural elucidation of alkaloids at Roger Adams' laboratory strengthened Govindachari's conviction to continue his researches along the same lines. Back in India, he continued working on alkaloids, terpenoids and oxygen heterocycles and worked on isoquinolines, phenathridines, benzophenanthridines, pyridophenanthridines, dibenzoquinolizines, terpenes, flavones, and furocoumarins. Tylophorine from Tylophora (now included in Vincetoxicum), tiliacorine from Tiliacora, echitamine from Alstonia, ropsine from Kopsia, gentianine from Gentiana, karpaine from Carica, and ancistroclaline from Ancistrocladus are some of the compounds structurally elucidated by him. He also worked on Azadirachta indica for isolating its constituents.

At Presidency College, he mentored a number of research scholars which included Kuppuswamy Nagarajan, N. S. Narasimhan, N. Arumugam, B. S. Thyagarajan, M. V. Lakshmikantham, K. W. Gopinath, S. Rajappa, N. Viswanathan and P. C. Parthasarathy who all went on to become notable chemists. During his tenure at Ciba-Geigy Research Center, the institution was reported to have examined over 10,000 plant extracts and compounds which resulted in the development of 5 drugs, including Sintamil and Satranidazole, both already released into Indian market. His investigations on Wedelia calendulacea returned the isolation of wedelolactone having a novel furocoumarin structure with a pterocarpan template, which, though declared inactive during the initial tests at Abbott Laboratories, later found out to have antihepatitic properties. This was subsequently confirmed by H. Wagner, a German phytochemist. He established two research centres, the R&D facility for Amrutanjan Healthcare and Centre for Agrochemical Research for SPIC Science Foundation and at the former, he contributed to the development of an extraction and purification process for Vinca alkaloids.

Govindachari has published his research findings in a book, Chemistry of Natural Products: V. 8, and over 340 articles. (Note: Please see Selected bibliography section) His work has also been quoted in several text books, treatises and other works. (Note: Please see Citations section) He was associated with science journals viz. Indian Journal of Chemistry, Medicinal and Aromatic plants Abstracts and The Wealth of India as a member of their editorial board. He sat in the council of the Indian National Science Academy from 1966 to 1968 and in the bureau of International Union of Pure and Applied Chemistry (IUPAC) from 1963 to 1970 and served as the founder trustee of the National Organic Symposium Trust, a science forum promoting organic chemistry in India, from 1983 to 1986. He was a member of the Pharmaceuticals and Drugs Committee of the Council of Scientific and Industrial Research and the research councils of National Chemical Laboratory and Central Drug Research Institute. He presided the Indian Chemical Society during 1971–72 and was a member of Royal Society of Chemistry, the American Chemical Society and Swiss Chemical Society. He was the nominator for Robert Burns Woodward who won the Nobel Prize for Chemistry in 1965.

== Awards and honors ==
The Indian Academy of Sciences elected Govindachari as its fellow in 1951 and the Indian National Science Academy followed suit in 1959. When the Council of Scientific and Industrial Research awarded him the Shanti Swarup Bhatnagar Prize in 1960, he became the first recipient of the award in the chemical sciences category. The Indian National Science Academy awarded him the Meghanad Saha Medal; the Academy would honor him again in 1986 with the Golden Jubilee Commemoration Medal. He received the Lifetime Achievement Award of the Chemical Research Society of India in 2000.

Govindachari delivered several award orations and the list includes Professor K. Venkataraman Endowment Lectureship of Bombay University (1965 and 1996), Dr. Mahendra Lal Sircar Memorial Lectureship of Indian Association for the Cultivation of Science (1970), Sir S. Subramania Iyer Lectureship of Madras University (1970), H. K. Sen Memorial Lectureship (1970) and the plenary lecture in the inaugural meeting of the Natural Products Section of the International Union of Pure and Applied Chemistry. Alkaloids: Chemical and Biological Perspectives journal dedicated the volume 15 of their 2001 edition to Govindachari and ARKIVOC issued a Festschrift on him through their volume VIII in 2001.

== Selected bibliography ==
=== Books ===
- T. R. Govindachari, ed. (January 1973). Chemistry of Natural Products: v. 8. Butterworth-Heinemann. p. 184. ISBN 978-0408704373.

=== Articles ===
- TR Govindachari; K Nagarajan; S Rajappa (1957). "526. Synthesis of gentianine". Journal of the Chemical Society: 2725–26. doi:10.1039/JR9570002725.
- TR Govindachari; K Nagarajan; S Rajappa (1962). "Structure of CALYCANTHIDINE". Journal of Scientific and Industrial Research. 21 (9): 455.
- Ramamurthy Charubala; Bantwal Ramachandra Pai; Tuticorin Raghavachari Govindachari; Narayana Viswanathan (1968). "Synthese von (±)-Predicentrin". Chem. Ber. 101 (8): 2665–68. doi:10.1002/cber.19681010808. PMID 5683925.
- Govindachari, T. R.; Malathi, R.; Gopalakrishnan, Geetha; Suresh, G.; Rajan, S. S. (1999). "Isolation of a new tetranortriterpenoid from the uncrushed green leaves of Azadirachta indica". Phytochemistry. 52 (6): 1117–19. Bibcode:1999PChem..52.1117G. doi:10.1016/S0031-9422(99)00367-2.
- Govindachari, T. R.; Suresh, G.; Gopalakrishnan, Geetha; Masilamani, S.; Banumathi, B. (2000). "Antifungal activity of some tetranortriterpenoids". Fitoterapia. 71 (3): 317–320. doi:10.1016/S0367-326X(99)00155-0. PMID 10844171.
- Govindachari, T. R.; Krishna Kumari, G. N.; Gopalakrishnan, G.; Suresh, G.; Wesley, S. D.; Sreelatha, T. (2001). "Insect antifeedant and growth regulating activities of quassinoids from Samadera indica". Fitoterapia. 72 (5): 568–571. doi:10.1016/S0367-326X(00)00342-7. PMID 11429258.
- Malathi, R.; Kabaleeswaran, V.; Rajan, S. S.; Gopalakrishnan, Geetha; Govindachari, T. R. (2003). "Structure of azadirachtin-I, 11 β-H epimer". Journal of Chemical Crystallography. 33 (4): 229–232. Bibcode:2003JCCry..33..229M. doi:10.1023/A:1023816807690. S2CID 91770797.

=== Citations ===
- K. H. Overton (January 1971). Terpenoids and Steroids. Royal Society of Chemistry. pp. 105–. ISBN 978-0-85186-256-9.
- The Alkaloids: Chemistry and Physiology. Academic Press. 18 March 1982. pp. 219–. ISBN 978-0-08-086543-0.
- The Alkaloids: Chemistry and Pharmacology. Academic Press. 20 November 1986. pp. 182–. ISBN 978-0-08-086553-9.
- Chemistry and Pharmacology. Academic Press. 31 August 1995. pp. 269–. ISBN 978-0-08-086570-6.
- F. G. Kathawala; Gary M. Coppola; Herbert F. Schuster (15 September 2009). The Chemistry of Heterocyclic Compounds, Isoquinolines. John Wiley & Sons. pp. 216–. ISBN 978-0-470-18865-1.
- Balawant Shankar Joshi (23 April 2015). A LIFE TO REMEMBER: An Autobiography. Xlibris Corporation. pp. 247–. ISBN 978-1-5035-4928-9.

== See also ==
- Roger Adams
- Robert Burns Woodward
- Kuppuswamy Nagarajan
- Isoquinolines
- Phenanthridines
