= Mangala (film) =

- Poster in Hindi
- Directed by: S. S. Vasan (Hindi); Chandru (Telugu)
- Based on: Mangamma Sapatham
- Produced by: S. S. Vasan
- Starring: P. Bhanumathi; Ranjan
- Cinematography: Kamal Ghosh; Rajabathar
- Edited by: Chandru (Hindi); M. Umanath (Telugu)
- Music by: M. D. Parthasarathy
- Production company: Gemini Studios
- Release dates: 1950 (Hindi): 14 January 1951 (Telugu)
- Running time: 182 minutes
- Country: India
- Languages: Hindi; Telugu

Mangala is an Indian film produced by S. S. Vasan of Gemini Studios. Filmed in Telugu and Hindi languages, it is a remake of the studio's own Tamil film Mangamma Sabatham (1943). The film stars P. Bhanumathi and Ranjan. The Hindi version, released in 1950 was directed by Vasan while the Telugu version, released a year later on 14 January, was directed by Chandru.

== Plot ==
Mangala, the spirited daughter of a wealthy farmer, encounters the prince while chasing her pet pigeon. Captivated by her beauty, the prince falls in love at first sight. However, when Mangala resists his advances, the prince vows to marry her and confine her in a prison. Mangala, undeterred, boldly challenges him, declaring that if that ever came to pass she will bear his son and ensure the child punishes him.

The prince marries Mangala and imprisons her, but she secretly escapes with her father’s assistance. Determined to teach the prince a lesson, Mangala masters the dommari (street performance) arts. Disguised as a dancer, she performs before the prince, who once again falls for her charm and remarries her. Mangala gives birth to a son and raises him with care and discipline at her father’s home, ensuring he excels in his education. Ultimately, Mangala fulfills her challenge, with her son confronting the prince and delivering justice.

== Cast ==
- P. Bhanumathi as Mangala
- Ranjan as the prince

== Production ==
Mangala, filmed in Telugu and Hindi languages, is a remake of Gemini Studios' own Tamil film Mangamma Sabatham (1943). While Ranjan reprised his role from the Tamil film, Vasundhara Devi was replaced by P. Bhanumathi. Producer S. S. Vasan directed the Hindi version, and Chandru directed the Telugu version. The Hindi version's length was 4,799.00 metres (15,744.75 ft), and the Telugu version was 182 minutes.

== Soundtrack ==
The music was composed by M. D. Parthasarathy. He worked alone in Telugu, and with E. Shankar Shastri and Balkrishan Kalla in Hindi. The song "Suno Suno Pyare More Sajna" from the Hindi soundtrack is based on "I, Yi, Yi, Yi, Yi (I Like You Very Much)".

- "Jhanan Jhanana" – P. Bhanumathi

== Release ==
The Hindi version of Mangala was released in 1950, and the Telugu version a year later, on 14 January 1951.

== Bibliography ==
- Rajadhyaksha, Ashish; Willemen, Paul (1998) [1994]. Encyclopaedia of Indian Cinema. British Film Institute and Oxford University Press. ISBN 0-19-563579-5.
