= Mangamma Sabatham (1943 film) =

- Theatrical release poster
- Directed by: Acharya
- Written by: Acharya
- Produced by: S. S. Vasan
- Starring: Vasundhara; Ranjan
- Cinematography: Ramnoth
- Edited by: Chandru
- Music by: S. Rajeswara Rao; M. D. Parthasarathy
- Production company: Gemini Studios
- Distributed by: Gemini Studios
- Release date: 30 July 1943
- Country: India
- Language: Tamil

Mangamma Sabatham (transl. Mangamma's vow) is a 1943 Indian Tamil-language film, starring Vasundhara Devi, Ranjan, N. S. Krishnan and T. A. Mathuram. The film was produced by S. S. Vasan and written and directed by T. G. Raghavachari, credited as Acharya. The film was remade in Hindi and Telugu as Mangala (1950 and 1951) and again in Telugu as Mangamma Sapatham (1965).

== Plot ==
Mangamma (Vasundhara devi), the daughter of a villager named Venkatachalam meets Prince Sugunan (Ranjan) after chasing her pet pigeon accidentally into the royal garden. Captivated by her looks, the prince who is a rake, disguises himself as a gardener and flirts with her. After luring her into the palace, he tries to force himself upon her. Mangamma manages to escape but Sugunan, determined to possess her, sends one of his guards to find her.

In their next encounter, Mangamma outwits and humiliates him in front of a bunch of villagers. A furious Sugunan then vows to marry her, imprison her and make her live a widow's life to break her pride. In exchange, Mangamma vows that if all that ever happens, she will bear him a child, who will one day whip him in court and avenge her.

Sugunan eventually gets his way, as mangamma is left with no choice but to accept the royal family's marriage proposal. After the wedding, Mangamma asks him to set aside their differences and pleads acceptance, but he refuses and has her imprisoned in an isolated palace. With her father's help, she arranges for a secret tunnel to be built between the prison and her home, allowing her to escape the palace often without anyone noticing. Determined to fulfill her vow, she learns music and dance from Sathan (N. S. Krishnan), an acrobat, and his crew. She assumes a disguise and appears before Sugunan as an unknown nomadic street performer. Unable to recognize her, Sugunan falls for her all over again and spends the night with her.

Mangamma later gives birth to a son and raises him in secret with her father's assistance. When he comes of age, he is determined to avenge his mother and bring about Sugunan's public humiliation. He ultimately whips Sugunan in court. The movie ends with Sugunan acknowledging his wrongdoings and pleading for Mangamma's forgiveness. Thus, Mangamma succeeds in executing her vow.

== Cast ==
Adapted from the song book:

- Vasundhara as Mangamma
- Ranjan as Sugunan, Jayapalan
- P. A. Subbaiah Pillai as Venkatachalam
- P. N. Seshagiri Bhagavathar as King
- P. V. Rao as Minister
- P. Appanna Iyengar as Adappakkaran
- Puliyoor Duraisami Iyer as Guard
- M. Ramamurthi as Sumathi
- A. S. Leelavathi as Rathi
- Kolathu Mani as Acrobat
- Ramasami as Sarangi
- N. S. Krishnan as Sathan
- T. A. Mathuram as Yamuna

== Production ==
Mangamma Sabatham is the first film that N. S. Krishnan and T. A. Mathuram featured for Gemini Studios. Krishnan trained hard to do the tight-rope walking scene himself without using a double.

== Soundtrack ==
Music was composed by S. Rajeswara Rao and M. D. Parthasarathy while the lyrics were penned by Papanasam Sivan and Kothamangalam Subbu.

| Song | Singer | Lyricist | Raga | Length |
|---|---|---|---|---|
| "Puththiyulla Manithar Enraal" | Vasundhara | Kothamangalam Subbu | Maand | 02:44 |
| "Anjaathae Nee Vaa" | Vasundhara | Kothamangalam Subbu | Hamsadvani | 01:41 |
| "Vanna Puraavae Nee Yaar" | Ranjan | Kothamangalam Subbu | Sindhu Bhairavi | 01:51 |
| "Aanantham Ithae" | Vasundhara | | Hindustani | 01:53 |
| "Siridhum kavalaippadaathe" | Vasundara | | Karaharapriya | |
| "Pennbuthiyaale" | Vasundara | Papanasam Sivan | Nadanamakriya | |
| "Udal nalame peralaam" | T. A. Madhuram | | Hindustani | |
| "Ayyaiyaiya Solla Vetkamaguthae" | Vasundara | | | |
| "Jayame Jayame" | Vasundara Devi | Papanasam Sivan | Bilahari | 02:04 |
| "Ponnirukku" | N. S. Krishnan | | Durga | |
| "Ummele thaan aasai aiyaave" | T. A. Madhuram | | Pilu | |
| "Paaril nalvazhi kaatti" | Vasundara | | Todi | |
| "Kaavaali payale" | N. S. Krishnan, Ramasamy | | Hindustani | |
| "Punnagai thavaz" | Vasundara | Papanasam Sivan | Yadhukula Kambhoji and Kurinji | |
| "Anandam aanandam" | Vasundara, Ranjan | | Nagaswaravali | |

== Release and reception ==
Mangamma Sabatham was released on 30 July 1943. The Indian Express wrote that despite the lengthy running time, it was "a perfect artistic unit in every detail". According to historian Randor Guy, the film netted a profit of ₹4 million (equivalent to ₹660 million or US$7.1 million in 2026).

== Remakes ==
Mangamma Sabatham was remade in Hindi in 1950 and Telugu in 1951, both titled Mangala. A Sinhala remake Mathalan was released in 1955. A second Telugu remake, Mangamma Sapatham, was released in 1965.

== Bibliography ==
- Rajadhyaksha, Ashish; Willemen, Paul (1998) [1994]. Encyclopaedia of Indian Cinema. British Film Institute and Oxford University Press. ISBN 0-19-563579-5.
