= Vanji Kottai Valipan =

- Poster
- Directed by: S. S. Vasan
- Screenplay by: K. J. Mahadevan
- Story by: Kothamangalam Subbu; K. J. Mahadevan; C. Srinivasan; Ki. Ra.
- Produced by: S. S. Vasan
- Starring: Gemini Ganesan; Vyjayanthimala; Padmini
- Cinematography: P. Ellappa
- Edited by: N. R. Krishnaswamy
- Music by: C. Ramachandra and R.Vaidyanathan
- Production company: Gemini Studios
- Distributed by: Gemini Pictures
- Release date: 12 April 1958
- Running time: 183 minutes
- Country: India
- Language: Tamil
- Box office: ₹ 3.6 million

Vanji Kottai Valipan (transl. The Young Man of Vanji Fort) is a 1958 Indian Tamil-language historical adventure film written by the Gemini Studios story department, consisting of K. J. Mahadevan, C. Srinivasan and Kothamangalam Subbu, while the film was directed and produced by S. S. Vasan. It stars Gemini Ganesan, Vyjayanthimala and Padmini, with P. S. Veerappa, T. K. Shanmugam, P. Kannamba, Vijayakumari, K. A. Thangavelu and M. S. Sundari Bai in supporting roles. The camera was handled by P. Ellappa, the audiography by C. E. Biggs, and the editing by N. R. Krishna Sami. This film was remade in Hindi as Raj Tilak with the same lead actors.

== Plot ==
Chokkalingam Navalar is a diwan at Vanjikottai Kingdom. He and his wife, Sivakami, are loyal to their king. Chokkalingam without any hesitation accuses that Senapathi, the brother of the King's second wife, Rani plotted the prince's killing. Found guilty, Senapathi is banished by the king but is helped by one of his soldiers to stay in the kingdom without anyone's knowledge. He later sets up a fire in the city and stabs the king with his sword. The grievously injured king tells Chokkalingam to save his daughter Padma and the infant prince, and dies later. In order to fulfill the king's desire, Chokkalingam sails to safety with the king's children, leaving his family behind. Soon his wife does the same with her children but is caught by Senapathi's army. Leaving her children on the moving boat, she is imprisoned for life at an island prison.

Sundar and his sister are saved by a sailor and Sundar starts to work there. At one point, a grown up Sundar saves all the travelers and the sailor rewards him much and drops Sundar and his sister at Vaji, a port town. Sundar plans to arrange his sister's wedding at Vanji, but it is interrupted by Senapathi, who kidnaps Gowri in Sunder's absence. While returning home for the preparation for the engagement, Sunder spots Gowri abducted by Senapathi in his Chariot. In order to escape from Senapathi, Gowri jumps out of the vehicle and dies soon. Sunder, who seeks justice from Senapathi, plans to kill him, only to be captured by his army. After he is found guilty of his action, Sundar is later imprisoned for life in an island jail. There, Sundar gets the chance to meet his mother. She explains past to him about Senapathi's persecution of their family and the Vanjikottai kingdom. They both plan to escape from the prison. However, his mother dies in the attempt. Sundar jumps into the sea and escapes. He was saved by a ship carrying slaves to Ratna Island.

Landed as a slave on Ratna island, Sundar meets Princess Mandakini. The princess at first is averse to the attitude of Sundar, who ignores her beauty and does not respond to her assertive and arrogant behaviour. Later, she falls for him and gives him special treatment. Though Sundar also likes her, he requests Mandakini to release him in order to find his father and solve the conspiracy in his kingdom. She agrees with all the requests on the condition that he would return within one month. Mandakini provides Sundar with expensive jewelry, clothes, and a boat, and sends Sundar to his kingdom. Meanwhile, Chokkalingam, who is living in one of the hinterland villages with Padma, the princess and the young prince, is planning a revolution along with Murugan, who serves as his spy at Vanjikottai palace. They all hide in a Chatram as pilgrims. After awareness of the revolution is disseminated to the masses in Vanjikottai, Chokkalingam returns to Vanjikkottai to bring down Senapathi's Government. He is later joined by Sundar, Padma, Murugan, Velan and his wife Rangamma. Sundar acts as a jewel merchant and deceives Maharani Ranthamani Devi and Senapathi by gaining their trust.He also plans to release Chokkalingam, Murugan and his wife Rangamma who were arrested by Senapathi during the revolution. He rescues Murugan and Rangamma from the prison. He also gets to know that Chokkalingam has been brought to the hill castle prison to undergo the death penalty.

Sundar later invites Maharani Ranthamani Devi and Senapathi to his palace to watch a consort by Padma.

By this time, since one month lapsed, Mandakini comes to Vanjikottai in search of Sundar. She set up her camp at the border of Vanjikottai and sends her spy to locate Sundar's place. While spotting Sundar and Padma together, her spy mistakes that Sunder is in love with Padma. Mandakini who hears the news approaches Sundar. Unable to explain his situation, Sundar asks Mandakini to watch the show along with Maharani Ranthamani Devi and Senapathi. Padma overhears their conversation and realizes Sunder's love for Mandakini and changes her mind by forgetting her love. In the Court, while watching the dance performed by Padma, Mandakini is angered by the meaning of Padma's song which indirectly tells her feelings towards Sundar. Soon, Mandakini changes her costume and gives stiff competition in dance to Padma. When Padma almost faints during the rotation, Sundar cuts the chandelier's rope making the chandelier crash, thus ending the dance competition. Then he orders Velan to drag Mandakini out and tie her into a room at a Chatram. After Senapathi has become intoxicated, Sundar uses this situation rescues Chokkalingam from prison.

Meanwhile, Mandakini who escapes from Velan, joins Senapathi and divulges details of the secret place where Chokkalingam, Sunder, Padma and others are hiding. In return, she asks him to send Sundar to her in order to live with him. Senapathi arrests all of them including Sundar. Mandakini realizes that Senapathi has tricked her, and gathers her army to save Sundar and the others. Murugan and the people of Vanjikottai head to Senapathi's palace to bring down his government. Knowing this, Senapathi leaves the palace for the immediate execution of Sundar and others' death penalty. Murugan gets to know the place where the execution is to occur and he brings his people to kill Senapathi. Mandakini who also arrives there with her army joins the battle to bring down Senapathi. During the battle, Senapathi throws his sword at Sundar, but it hits Mandakini when she tries to protect him. The battle ended with the killing of Senapathi. Mandakini died while uniting Padma with Sundar. Country is free from Senapathi's rule and Price is incarnated.

== Cast ==
Cast according to the opening credits of the film

- Gemini Ganesan as Sunderalingam
- Vyjayanthimala as Mandakini
- Padmini as Padma
- T. K. Shanmugam as Chokkalinga Navalar
- Kannamba as Sivakami, Navalar's Wife
- S. V. Subbaiah as Murugan
- M. S. Sundari Bai as Rangamma
- Veerappa as Senapathi Durjayan
- T. K. Ramachandran as Kothaval
- Vijayakumari as Gowri
- Meenakshi as Queen Rangamani Devi
- Daisy Irani as Prince Kumaran
- R. Balasubramaniam as King of Rathna Island
- D. Balasubramaniam as King Vikramasinga Boopathi
- Thangavelu as Velan
- Muthulakshmi as Velan's Wife

== Production ==
The film was inspired by the 1844 novel The Count of Monte Cristo. According to Ramanathan, owner of Abirami Malls, Chennai, his father V. S. Sivalingam bought the distribution rights for Vanji Kottai Valipan at a cost of ₹ 200,000 in 1956. The film suffered from too much of "process screen" or Back projection where many shots from Gemini Studios's Chandralekha were used. A case in point is the scene where actor Ranjan and his gang are riding on horses that was taken from Chandralekha. Besides, a passing by of a motor car was seen in a shot which was an anachronism in this pre-industrial era story.

== Soundtrack ==
The soundtrack was composed by C. Ramachandra, and R. Vaidyanathan while the lyrics were penned by Kothamangalam Subbu.

Song	Singers	Length
"Amma Amma"	C. S. Jayaraman	2:49
"Ethani Kelvi"	P. Susheela	3:33
"Kannum Kannum Kalanthu"	P. Leela & Jikki	6:56
"Raja Magal Roja Malar"	P. Leela	6:08
"Vennilave"	P. Leela	6:09
"Vetrivel"	Sirkazhi Govindarajan, Thiruchi Loganathan, T. V. Rathnam & Group	5:27
"Inba Kanavondru"	P. Susheela & Group	02:25
"Thaedi Thaedi Alaigirene"	Thiruchi Loganathan, V. N. Sundaram	03:44
"Vaikkal Vandi Baaram"	Thiruchi Loganathan, Sirkazhi Govindarajan & P. Leela	
"Elo Elaiah... Thenmalai Thekku Vetti"	Thiruchi Loganathan & group	
"Kanagamellam"	P. Susheela	
"Jaya Jaya"	C. Ramachandra, P. susheela	

== Reception ==
A critic from Free India praised the opening scene of the storm, dance performance of Padmini and Vyjayanthimala. In regards to acting, the critic stated Veerappa dominated as villain while also praising the rest of the cast and concluded saying the film provides "gamut of human emotions" with all elements necessary for a box-office success.

The film initially gained a big opening at the box office as it was the first film produced by S. S. Vasan after a 10-year gap since Chandralekha. The audience was pleased by the dances featuring the lead actresses; Vyjayanthimala and Padmini and the production value of the film. At the end of its theatrical run the film was labelled as a blockbuster at the box office. The film celebrated its 100th day theatrical run at Wellington theatre, LIC Building on 9 June 1959 with a full-packed house. The film was one of the successful Tamil films of 1958 along with films such as Nadodi Mannan and Uthama Puthiran. This film was the second biggest hit of the year 1958 after the mega hit Nadodi Mannan.

== Other versions ==
The film was remade in Hindi as Raj Tilak with Gemini Ganesan, Vyjayanthimala and Padmini, who reprised their roles from the original. It was also dubbed in Telugu as Vijaya Kota Veerudu.

== Legacy ==
The film was well known for its technical brilliance where the title sequence showing a ship caught in a storm was an excellent example of onscreen presentation which was rarely seen in South Indian film of that time. However, it was the dance sequence of Vyjayanthimala and Padmini in the song "Kannum Kannum Kalanthu", which was choreographed by Hiralal, brother of B. Sohanlal, that is still remembered even today by the critics and audience alike, where the popularity of the song surpasses the popularity garnered by the film. The song was regarded as the best dance sequence in Indian cinema. The song was also used by many Indian classical dancers for stage performances. Subsequently, the catch line used by Veerappa, "Shabhash, sariyana potti!", which means "Bravo, an excellent competition!" has become a famous catch line and is still used by the people of Tamil Nadu.
