= Kuppuswamy Nagarajan =

Indian scientist

- Born: 15 August 1930; Tamil Nadu, India
- Died: 8 April 2023 (aged 92)
- Education: Presidency College, Chennai; Wayne State University; University of Zurich
- Known for: Development of drugs Sintamil; Varsyl; Satranidazole
- Awards: 1974 Shanti Swarup Bhatnagar Prize
- Scientific career
- Fields: Organic chemistry
- Workplaces: Ciba-Geigy Research Center; Bangalore Pharmaceutical & Research Laboratory; Recon Limited; Rallis India Limited; Alkem Laboratories
- Doctoral advisor: T. R. Govindachari; C. L. Stevens; J.D. Roberts; H. Schmid

Kuppuswamy Nagarajan (15 September 1930 – 8 April 2023) was an Indian organic chemist.

Nagarajan earned a Ph.D. with Prof. T. R. Govindachari, Presidency College, Madras.

Nagarajan won the Shanti Swarup Bhatnagar Prize for Chemical Sciences, 1974;

Nagarajan died on 8 April 2023, at the age of 92.

== Selected papers ==
- Kuppuswamy Nagarajan, Vunnam R. Rao, Rashmi K. Shah, Sharada J. Shenoy, Hans Fritz, Wilhelm J. Richter, Dieter Muller, "Condensed Heterotricycles. Synthesis and Reactions of b-Fused 1(2H)-Isoquinolinones with unusual enaminic properties", Helvetica Chimica Acta, Volume 71, Issue 1, pages 77–92, 3 February 1988
- Kuppuswamy Nagarajan, Patrick J. Rodriguesa and Munirathinam Nethajib, "Vilsmeier-Haack reaction of 1-methyl-34-dihydroisoquino lines-unexpected formation of 2,3-bisdimethylamino-5,6-dihydropyrrolo (2,1- ) isoquinolines", Tetrahedron Letters, Volume 33, Issue 47, 17 November 1992, Pages 7229-7232
- Kuppuswamy Nagarajan, Joy David, Agasaladinni N. Goud, 10-Alkyl- and 10-aminoalkyl-2,2'-bis(trifluoromethyl)-3,10'-biphenothiazines, J. Med. Chem., 1974, 17 (6), pp 652–653, June 1974
