= Raj Tilak (1958 film) =

- Directed by: S. S. Vasan
- Screenplay by: K. J. Mahadevan; Ramanand Sagar
- Story by: Kothamangalam Subbu; K. J. Mahadevan; Ramanand Sagar
- Based on: The Count of Monte Cristo by Alexandre Dumas
- Produced by: S. S. Vasan; M. A. Partha Sarathy
- Starring: Gemini Ganeshan; Padmini; Vyjayanthimala; Pran
- Cinematography: P. Ellappa
- Edited by: N. R. Krishnaswamy
- Music by: C. Ramchandra
- Production companies: Gemini Studios, Madras
- Distributed by: Gemini Pictures
- Release date: 1958
- Running time: 171 minutes
- Country: India
- Language: Hindi

Raj Tilak (transl. Coronation) is a 1958 Indian Hindi-language Ruritanian romance epic film written by the Gemini Studios story department, consisting of K. J. Mahadevan, C. Srinivasan and Kothamangalam Subbu, along with Ramanand Sagar, while the film was directed and produced by S. S. Vasan. The film features Gemini Ganeshan, Padmini and Vyjayanthimala in the lead roles, along with Pran, Gajanan Jagirdar, Bipin Gupta, Manmohan Krishna, Lalita Pawar, Durga Khote, Agha, Shammi forming an ensemble cast. The music of the film was composed by C. Ramchandra.

The screenplay was written by Ramanand Sagar. The film was a remake of 1958 Tamil film Vanjikottai Valiban.

== Plot ==
Chandrashekhar, shortly called Chandar, lives and works on a ship with his sister Savitri, they are raised by the ship's captain. Now, Chandar becomes busy for Savitri's marriage and fixes in a decent family. Before marriage, Savitri is abducted by Senapati Durjay Singh; to save her honour, she kills herself in front of Chandar. Enraged Chandar vows to take revenge on Durjan, but is captured by his goons and jailed in a fort, where he meets his long-lost mother. There he learns of his past as he is the son of Mangalsen, who was the faithful Chief Minister under Maharaja Vikram Singh, who was killed by none other than Durjay. To save the Prince and Princess, Mangalsen took them with him, on the other side his wife took their son and daughter to escape by boats, however, Mangalsen managed to escape while his wife failed and was captured by Durjay's goons, leaving her children on the boat, separating them from their parents. Now, Chandar hits upon a plan to meet his father and take revenge on Durjay. However, his mother dies in jail and Chandar manages to escape, and ends up on a ship, which transports him to the arrogant Princess Mandakini, who wants Chandar as her slave for a lifetime. On the other side, Mangalsen, who now becomes Sardar, trains the villagers, along with Princess Padma and Prince, to fight against the evils lead by Durjay. What will be the next? Will Chandar meet his father? Could he take revenge against Durjay? What will Princesses Padma and Mandakini do on this tricky situation have formed the climax.

== Cast ==
- Gemini Ganeshan as Chandrashekhar "Chandar"
- Padmini as Princess Padma
- Vyjayanthimala as Princess Mandakini
- Pran as Senapati Durjay Singh
- Gajanan Jagirdar as Sardar Mangalsen
- Durga Khote as Mangalsen's Wife
- Bipin Gupta as Maharaja Vikram Singh
- Manmohan Krishna as Madhav
- Lalita Pawar as Alka
- Romi as Prince
- Agha as Govind
- Shammi as Govind's Wife
- Kumar as Ship Captain
- C. R. Vijayakumari as Savitri
- Meenakshi as Maharani
- T. K. Ramachandran as Gajpal

== Soundtrack ==
The music was composed by C. Ramchandra and the lyrics were written by P. L. Santoshi.

Song	Singer
"Aaj Na Jane Reh Reh"	Lata Mangeshkar
"Dil Jo De Doongi Raja"	Lata Mangeshkar
"Jaan-E-Jigar Dekho Idhar"	Asha Bhosle
"Aaja Tu Raja Aaja Mausam-E-Bahar Hai"	Asha Bhosle, Sudha Malhotra
"Chalna Sambhal Sambhal Ke Ji Chalna Sambhal Ke"	Asha Bhosle, Mohammed Rafi
"Aayi Re O Kali Ghata"	Mohammed Rafi
"Na Bolegi Na Bolegi"	Manna Dey
"Bam Bholanath Bam Bhola"	Manna Dey

== Inspirations and remakes ==
The film was a remake of 1958 Tamil film Vanjikottai Valiban, which also directed by S. S. Vasan with Gemini Ganeshan, Vyjayanthimala and Padmini. The film itself was inspired by the 1844 novel The Count of Monte Cristo by Alexandre Dumas.
