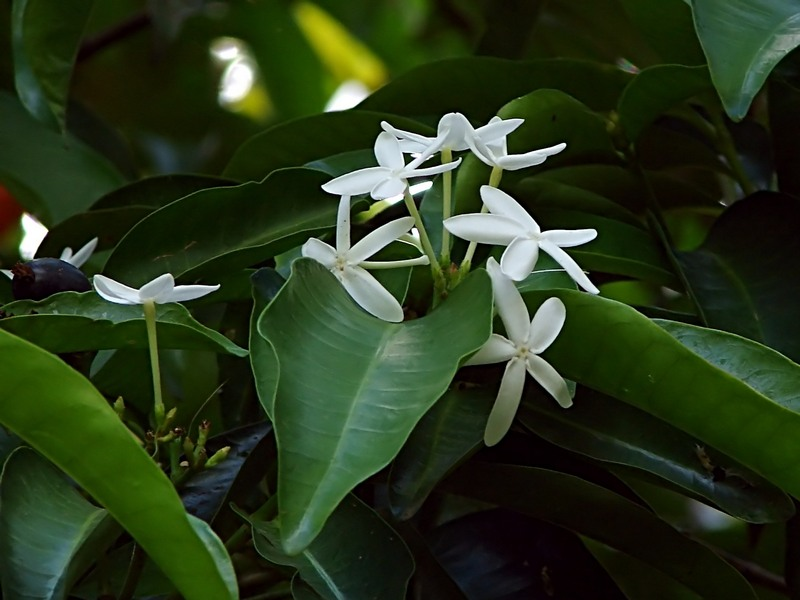

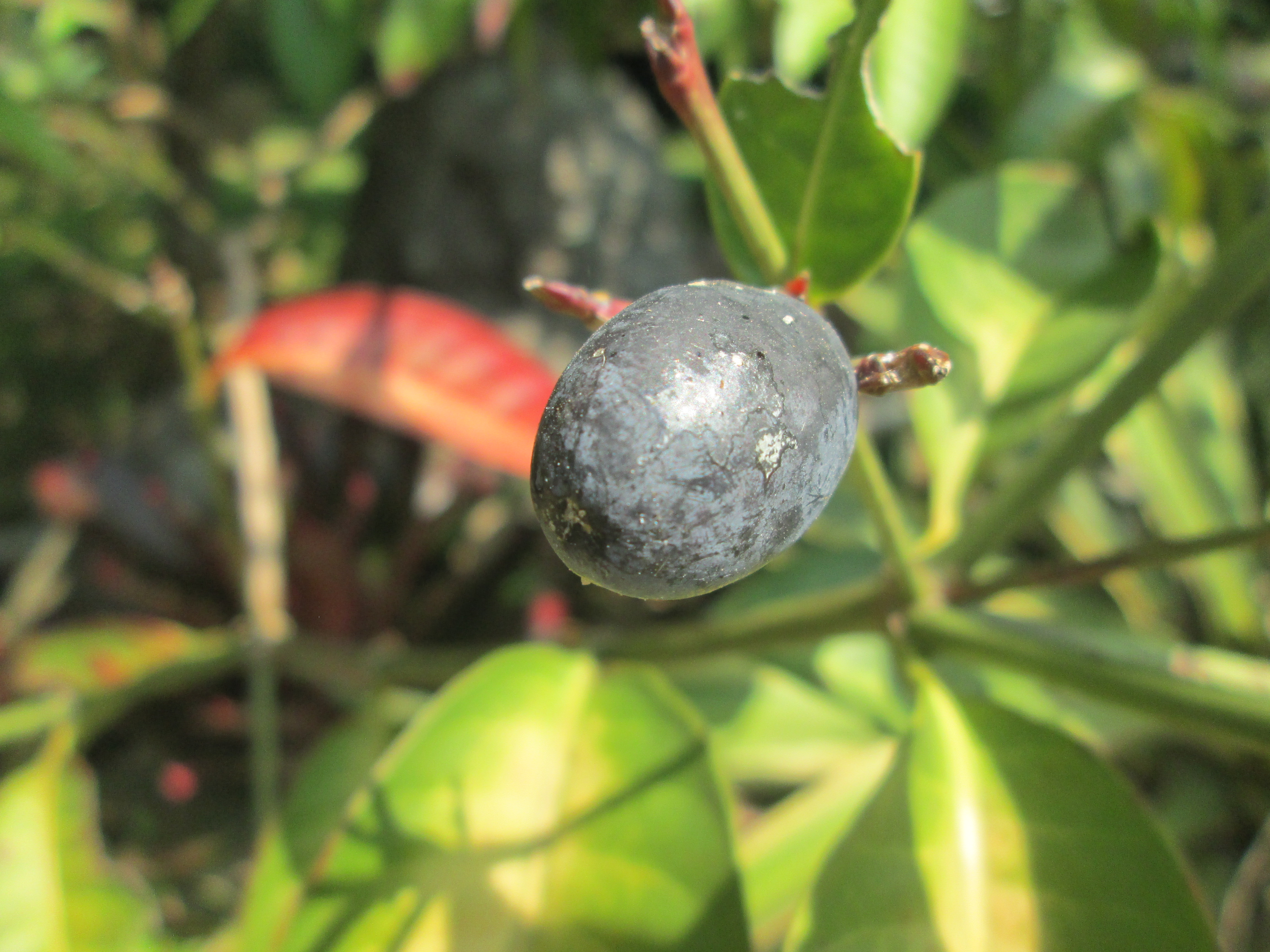

Conservation status
- Least Concern (IUCN 3.1)

Scientific classification
- Kingdom: Plantae
- Clade: Embryophytes
- Clade: Tracheophytes
- Clade: Spermatophytes
- Clade: Angiosperms
- Clade: Eudicots
- Clade: Asterids
- Order: Gentianales
- Family: Apocynaceae
- Genus: Kopsia
- Species: K. arborea

Binomial name
- Kopsia arborea Blume

Synonyms
- Kopsia jasminiflora Pit.; Kopsia lancibracteolata Merr.; Kopsia laxinervia Merr.; Kopsia longiflora Merr.; Kopsia officinalis Tsiang & P.T.Li; Kopsia pitardii Merr.; Kopsia pruniformis Rchb.f. & Zoll. ex Bakh.f.; Kopsia scortechinii King & Gamble

= Kopsia arborea =

Species of plant

Kopsia arborea is a tree in the family Apocynaceae.

== Description ==
Kopsia arborea grows up to 14 metres (50 ft) tall, with a trunk diameter of up to 10 centimetres (4 in). The bark is grey. Its flowers feature a white corolla. The fruits are blue-black, ellipsoid or roundish, up to 4.2 cm (2 in) long.

== Distribution and habitat ==
Kopsia arborea is native to China, Thailand, Vietnam, Malesia and Australia. It is found in a variety of habitats from sea level to 1,500 metres (5,000 ft) altitude.

== Uses ==
In China, local traditional medicinal uses include as an enema and as a treatment for tonsillitis.
