= Doctor Savithri =

1955 film by R. M. Krishnaswamy

- Theatrical release poster
- Directed by: R. M. Krishnaswamy
- Screenplay by: Acharya; A. K. Velan; Elangovan
- Story by: Acharya
- Based on: Savitri and Satyavan
- Produced by: M. Radhakrishnan
- Starring: Anjali Devi; S. Balachander; M. N. Nambiar; B. R. Panthulu
- Cinematography: R. M. Krishnaswamy
- Edited by: R. M. Venugopal
- Music by: G. Ramanathan
- Production company: Aruna Films
- Release date: 25 November 1955
- Country: India
- Language: Tamil

Doctor Savithri is a 1955 Indian Tamil-language legal thriller film directed by R. M. Krishnaswamy and written by Acharya. A contemporary adaptation of the Hindu story of Savitri and Satyavan, the film stars Anjali Devi, S. Balachander, M. N. Nambiar and B. R. Panthulu. It revolves around the title character's (Anjali Devi) efforts to clear the name of her wrongfully convicted husband (Panthulu). The film was released on 25 November 1955 and became a success.

== Plot ==
Savithri is a doctor who treats the poor for free. When she discovers that Vanaja, a young wealthy woman in their community, is being harassed by Nagalingam, a crooked lawyer. She and her husband Somasundaram endeavour to help Vanaja. Later, Nagalingam is murdered by an unknown assailant and Somasundaram is wrongfully convicted of the crime. Savithri investigates the murder and identifies the true killer as Jagath Singh, a doctor who had been blackmailed by Nagalingam.

== Cast ==
Female cast

- Anjali Devi as Dr. Savithri
- T. A. Mathuram as Aandal
- M. N. Rajam as Vanaja
- Chellam as the lawyer's wife
- Baby Kanchana as Vimala

Male cast

- S. Balachander Doctor Jagath Singh
- M. N. Nambiar as Krishnamoorthy
- B. R. Panthulu as Somasundaram
- D. Balasubramaniam as Lawyer Nagalingam
- Serukalathur Sama as Sambandam Pillai
- N. S. Krishnan as Muniyan
- S. D. R. Chandran as Judge
- G. V. Sharma as Public Prosecutor
- Ramaraj as Defense Lawyer
- Ashokan as Commissioner
- C. P. Kittan as Monkey Performer
- Sethuraman as Paranoid and Greedy Person
- Sobharaj as Inspector
- A. Karunanidhi as Guest artist

Dance

- Sayee, Subbulakshmi

== Production ==
In 1941, a Tamil language film based on the Hindu story of Savitri and Satyavan, titled Savithri was released. More than a decade later, T. G. Raghavachari (Acharya) sought to create a new adaptation of the story but with a modern setting. Titled Doctor Savithri, the film's story and screenplay was written by Acharya and it was directed by R. M. Krishnaswamy and produced by M. Radhakrishnan under the banner Aruna Films. Krishnaswamy also served as the cinematographer, while Raghavan was the art director, and R. M. Venugopal was the editor. Acharya wrote the dialogues, along with A. K. Velan and Elangovan. Roy Chowdary, Muthuswamy Pillai (Sayee Subbulakshmi) and Gopalakrishnan were in charge of the choreography. The film was processed at AVM Studios.

== Soundtrack ==
Music was composed by G. Ramanathan.

Song	Singer	Lyrics	Duration
"Thensuvai Mevum Sendhamizh"	P. Leela	A. Maruthakasi	03:09
"Naayagar Pakshamadi"	P. A. Periyanayaki & A. P. Komala	Mayavaram Vethanayagam Pillai	02:54
"Kasikku Pona Karu Undaagum"	N. S. Krishnan & T. A. Mathuram	Udumalai Narayana Kavi	02:33
"Vaadham Vambu Panna Koodadhu"	N. S. Krishnan	Udumalai Narayana Kavi	02:25
"Moolai Veettukulle Mudangi Kidakkira Muniyappa"	P. Leela	Udumalai Narayana Kavi	02:57
"Jegamengum Pugalongum Veera Dheera Singam"	N. S. Krishnan & Thiruchi Loganathan	Udumalai Narayana Kavi	06:03
"Maayi Mahamaayi.... Aadhi Parameswariye"	T. M. Soundararajan & A. G. Rathnamala	Udumalai Narayana Kavi	06:24
"Thenpazhani Malai Mel"	T. M. Soundararajan		03:24
"Nilavodu Neelavanam Uravada"	Thiruchi Loganathan & Jikki	A. Maruthakasi	

== Release and reception ==
Doctor Savithri was released on 25 November 1955, delayed from Diwali. On the same day The Indian Express wrote, "The atmosphere of mystery and suspense is well maintained to the last though the all-too-brief finale is a bit all-too-tame". The film emerged a commercial success; this assisted in establishing Aruna Films as a leading production company in the 1950s Tamil film industry.
