= Apoorva Sagodharargal (1949 film) =

- Film Poster
- Directed by: Acharya
- Screenplay by: Acharya, Sangu, Kittu, Naina, Subbu, Ki. Ra.
- Produced by: K. J. Mahadevan; S. S. Vasan
- Starring: M. K. Radha; P. Bhanumathi
- Cinematography: Kamal Ghosh
- Edited by: Chandru
- Music by: Rajeswara Rao; M. D. Parthasarathy; R. Vaidyanathan
- Production company: Gemini
- Distributed by: Gemini Pictures Circuit Ltd.
- Release dates: 21 October 1949 (Tamil/Hindi); 14 January 1950 (Telugu)
- Languages: Tamil; Hindi; Telugu

Apoorva Sagodharargal (English: Strange Brothers) is a 1949 Indian Tamil-language action film directed by Acharya. The film which was adapted from Alexandre Dumas' 1844 novella The Corsican Brothers stars M. K. Radha and P. Bhanumathi, with Nagendra Rao and Suryaprabha playing supporting roles. It revolves around two lookalike brothers who were separated during childhood by their cruel uncle who murdered his parents. The rest of the film shows how the two brothers join in avenging the death of their parents.

Apoorva Sagodharargal was simultaneously produced in Tamil, Telugu and Hindi languages by Gemini Studios. The Telugu version Apoorva Sahodarulu (English: Strange Brothers) was directed by C. Pullayya, and the Hindi version Nishan (English: Mark) by S. S. Vasan. While the Telugu version had the same cast as the Tamil version, the Hindi version had Ranjan replacing Radha and a slightly different supporting cast.

== Plot ==
Mahendra Bhoopathi and Marthandan are rival kings. When Bhoopathi's wife gives birth to conjoined twins, Dr. Nanjappa successfully separates them. During a surprise attack, Marthandan and his men set fire to Bhoopathi's fort, believing the entire clan has perished. However, Nanjappa secretly takes the babies to safety. The elder twin, Vijayan, grows up in the city, while the younger, Vikraman, is raised in the forest by the loyal Marudhu.

When the twins turn 25, Nanjappa reunites them and reveals their history. They vow to avenge their father's death and restore their kingdom's glory. Meanwhile, Vijayan rescues the beautiful Kanchana from the ageing but lustful Marthandan and his men, and the two fall in love. Conflict develops when Vikraman also falls for Kanchana. As the younger twin, he experiences intense physical desire whenever Vijayan and Kanchana are together, threatening the brothers' relationship.

Determined not to come between the brothers or distract them from their mission, Kanchana leaves Vijayan in the forest, but is captured by Marthandan. The remainder of the story centres on the twins' efforts to rescue Kanchana and bring Marthandan to justice.

== Cast ==
Cast according to the opening credits of the Tamil version and the respective songbooks:

Cast (Tamil)	Cast (Telugu)	Cast (Hindi)	Role (Tamil)	Role (Telugu)	Role (Hindi)
P. Bhanumathi			Kanchana	Kanchana	Ranjana
M. K. Radha		Ranjan	Vijayasimhan, Vikramasimhan	Vijaya, Vikrama	Vijay Singh, Vikram Singh
Nagendra Rao			Marthandan	Marthandavarma	Zorawar Singh
Narayana Rao			Marthandan's servant	Marthandavarma's servant	Zorawar's servant
G. Pattu Iyer		J. S. Casshyap	Doctor Nanjappa	Doctor Gaurinath	Doctor Shanker
V. P. S. Mani			Jambu	Shambhu	Himmat
D. Balasubramanian			Mahendra Bhoopathi	Mahendra Bhoopathi	Mahendra Singh
Suryaprabha			Maragatham	Manikyam	Al Beli
Lakshmiprabha			Neelaveni	Neelaveni	Neelam
Venkumamba			Rajeswari Devi	Rani	Mahendra Singh's Wife
Krishna Bai			Doctor's sister	Doctor's sister	Doctor's sister
Shyam Sunder			Doctor's brother-in-law	Doctor's brother-in-law	Doctor's brother-in-law
Stunt Somu		Balkrishna Kalla	Maruthappa	Madhav Singh	Madho Singh
J. S. Casshyap		G. Pattu Iyer	Rajasekharar	Rajasekharam	Raj Sekhar
Ramakrishna Rao			Messenger	Messenger	Messenger
Velayutham		K. S. Sengar	Mayanti	Maraiah	Chandan
Vijaya Rao			Marthandan's soldiers	Marthandavarma's soldiers	Zorawar Singh's soldiers
Sampath Kumar			Marthandan's soldiers	Marthandavarma's soldiers	Zorawar Singh's soldiers
Anand	G. V. Sharma	Anand	Marthandan's soldiers	Marthandavarma's soldiers	Zorawar Singh's soldiers
Balaram			Marthandan's soldiers	Marthandavarma's soldiers	Mahendra Singh's soldiers
T. S. B. Rao			Marthandan's soldiers	Marthandavarma's soldiers	Mahendra Singh's soldiers
G. V. Sharma	—	—	Shop servant	Shop servant	Shop servant
Gemini Boys and Girls					

== Production ==
Apoorva Sagodharargal was adapted from Alexandra Duma's novel The Corsican Brothers. Gregory Ratoff adapted the film and Douglas Fairbanks Jr played the dual role of the conjoined twins Lucien and Mario Franchi. The film became successful which inspired Vasan to adapt the film in Tamil. T. G. Raghavachari alias Acharya lawyer turned film maker was selected to direct the film. M. K. Radha was selected to play the lead characters with Bhanumathi playing the lead actress. For the negative character, Vasan approached P. U. Chinnappa who refused fearing his image with Kannada actor Nagendra Rao being finalised for the role. "Stunt" Somu who did the stunt choreography appeared in the role of Marudhu, close associate of Bhoopathi. This film was often considered an unofficial sequel to Chandralekha.

== Soundtrack ==
The music was composed by Rajeswara Rao, M. D. Parthasarathy and R. Vaidyanathan and lyrics were written by Kothamangalam Subbu and V. Seetharaman. The song "Laddu Laddu" sung by Bhanumathi was well received. A duet meant for the Hindi version was composed on the piano by Rajeswara Rao, and Vasan liked it so much he wanted it for the Tamil version too. This song was added after the shoot was over. Malayalam lyrics written by P Baskaran

No.	Song	Singer/s	Lyricist	Duration(m:ss)
1	"Enga Rasa Vanthan"	Chorus	Kothamangalam Subbu	00:32
2	"Thalelo Rajakumarargale"	Chorus	Kothamangalam Subbu	03:09
3	"Maya Vinthaiyethane"	T. A. Mothi & P. Leela	Kothamangalam Subbu	3:54
4	"Manum Mayilum Adum Solai"	P. Bhanumathi	Kothamangalam Subbu	2:55
5	"Laddu Laddu Mittai Venumaa"	P. Bhanumathi	Kothamangalam Subbu	06:02
8	"Manamohaname Vanavaasame"	P. Bhanumathi	Kothamangalam Subbu	02:31
9	"Aaha Aaduvene Geetham Paduvene"	P. Bhanumathi & T. A. Mothi	Kothamangalam Subbu	03:30
10	"Paradhesame Pogaadhe"	T. A. Mothi	Kothamangalam Subbu	05:39

== Release and reception ==
Apoorva Sagodharargal was released on 21 October 1949. The film was a major success both at the box-office and with the critics. Dhananjayan praised M. K. Radha's acting as "finest and best in his career" and appreciated director Acharya for "bringing out the best performance from everyone and presenting an entertaining and engaging film". Randor Guy of The Hindu wrote that the film "is remembered for the excellent performances of Bhanumathi and Nagendra Rao, and for the music". The film was simultaneously shot in Telugu as Apoorva Sahodarulu, with Radha reprising the character. It was also remade in Hindi as Nishan with Ranjan replacing Radha. Bhanumathi was the lead actress for all the three versions.

== Legacy ==
The film introduced the concept of identical twins and their feelings and eventually became a trendsetter for similar themes. Later, the 1999 film Vaalee, starring Ajith Kumar also had a similar concept.

== Bibliography ==
- Dhananjayan, G. (2014). Pride of Tamil Cinema: 1931–2013. Blue Ocean Publishers. OCLC 898765509.
