= Irumbu Thirai (1960 film) =

- Theatrical release poster
- Directed by: S. S. Vasan
- Story by: Ganesh Subramaniyam along with Gemini Story Department
- Produced by: S. S. Vasan
- Starring: Sivaji Ganesan; Vyjayanthimala; B. Saroja Devi
- Cinematography: P. Elappa; N. C. BalaKrishnan
- Edited by: M. Umanath
- Music by: S. V. Venkatraman
- Production company: Gemini Studios
- Release date: 14 January 1960
- Country: India
- Language: Tamil

Irumbu Thirai (transl. Iron Curtain) is a 1960 Indian Tamil-language film produced and directed by S. S. Vasan. The film stars Sivaji Ganesan, Vyjayanthimala, K. A. Thangavelu and B. Saroja Devi, with S. V. Ranga Rao, Pandari Bai and Vasundhara Devi in supporting roles. A remake of Vasan's own Hindi film Paigham (1959), it revolves around two brothers Manikam and Kondamuthu and their mill owner.

The soundtrack was composed by S. V. Venkatraman and the lyrics were written by Kothamangalam Subbu, Papanasam Sivan and Pattukkottai Kalyanasundaram. The editing was done by M. Umanath while the camera was handled by P. Elappa and N. C. Bala Krishna. The film was released on 14 January 1960 and ran more than 175 days in theatres.

== Plot ==
The story revolves around two brothers Manikam and Saravanan and their mill owner.

== Cast ==
- Sivaji Ganesan as Manickavasagam (alias) Manickam
- Vyjayanthimala as Jayanthi
- B. Saroja Devi as Malathi
- Pandari Bai as Parvathi
- S. V. Subbaiah as Saravanan
- S. V. Ranga Rao as Mohanarangam
- Vasundhara Devi as Jayanthi's mother
- Radha Bai as Malathi's mother
- K. A. Thangavelu as Kottamuthu
- T. S. Durairaj as Gundu Pillai
- Vanaja as Challi
- D. Balasubramaniam as Judge
- Parthiban as Circle Inspector
- Javar Seetharaman as Lawyer
- Mukherji as Inspector
- Seetalakshmi as Sheela
- G. V. Sharma as Jeevan
- Pushpamala as Kamala
- Master Gopi as Bhola
- Karupaiah as Kundan
- S. R. Janaki as Saravanan and Manickam's mother
- Pattusamy as Sleuth
- Azhwar Kuppusami as Prosecutor
- Kannan as Factory Laber's

== Production ==
In 1959, S. S. Vasan, the proprietor of Gemini Studios, began working on a film built around capital-labour relations. The film, which was the Tamil remake of his own Hindi film Paigham, was untitled, and the creative team of Gemini could not come up with a convincing title. Vasan invited his employees to suggest a title for the under-production film, and he received an abundance of entries; one office boy submitted as many as 2500 entries. After examining one by one, Vasan chose the title Irumbu Thirai (transl. Iron Curtain). He also hosted a reception to honour the boy who suggested the title and rewarded him with some prize money. Besides producing, Vasan also directed the film.

The female cast of Paigham – Vyjayanthimala, B. Saroja Devi and Pandari Bai – returned to star in Irumbu Thirai, while Sivaji Ganesan reprised the role originally played by Dilip Kumar. It was a "coup of sorts" for Vasan to cast Ganesan since the latter had earlier been rejected by the former for a role in Chandralekha (1948), an incident which created a permanent rift between them. Vyjayanthimala's mother Vasundhara Devi played her screen mother as well, having done the same in Paigham. The final length of the film was 18396 feet.

== Themes ==
Irumbu Thirai focuses on capital-labour relations, and the conditions of working-class people.

== Soundtrack ==
The soundtrack was composed by S. V. Venkatraman. The album had Kothamangalam Subbu, Papanasam Sivan and Pattukkottai Kalyanasundaram as the lyricists. The song "Nenjil Kudiyirukkum" is set in the carnatic raga known as Shanmukhapriya, while the classical-themed "Enna Seidhaalum" is set in Kharaharapriya.

Song	Singers	Lyrics	Length
"Nenjil Kudiyirukkum"	T. M. Soundararajan & P. Leela	Pattukkottai Kalyanasundaram	03:57
"Aasai Konda Nenju Rendu"	P. Leela	Pattukkottai Kalyanasundaram	04:27
"Manidharai Manidhar Sari Nigar Samamaai"	Sirkazhi Govindarajan	Pattukkottai Kalyanasundaram	02:40
"Kaiyile Vaanginen Paiyile Podalai"	Thiruchi Loganathan	Pattukkottai Kalyanasundaram	03:00
"Erai Piditthavanum English Padichavanum"	Thiruchi Loganathan	Kothamangalam Subbu	03:19
"Nandri Ketta Manitharukku"	Sirkazhi Govindarajan	Kothamangalam Subbu	03:22
"Dabba Dabba Dabba"	S. C. Krishnan	Kothamangalam Subbu	
"Padipirkum Oru Kumbidu"	P. Leela & Jikki	Kothamangalam Subbu	02:47
"Nikkatuma Pogatuma"	Thiruchi Loganathan & K. Jamuna Rani	Kothamangalam Subbu	
"Enna Seidhaalum"	(Radha) Jayalakshmi	Papanasam Sivan	02:52

== Release and reception ==
Irumbu Thirai was released on 14 January 1960. Kanthan of Kalki wrote. The film was a commercial success, running for over 175 days in theatres and thereby becoming silver jubilee film.

== Bibliography ==
- Ganesan, Sivaji; Narayana Swamy, T. S. (2007) [2002]. Autobiography of an Actor: Sivaji Ganesan, October 1928 – July 2001. Sivaji Prabhu Charities Trust. OCLC 297212002.
- Guy, Randor (1997). Starlight, Starbright: The Early Tamil Cinema. Amra Publishers. OCLC 1049072979.
