= Kopsia profunda =

Conservation status
- Vulnerable (IUCN 3.1)

Scientific classification
- Kingdom: Plantae
- Clade: Tracheophytes
- Clade: Angiosperms
- Clade: Eudicots
- Clade: Asterids
- Order: Gentianales
- Family: Apocynaceae
- Genus: Kopsia
- Species: K. profunda

Binomial name
- Kopsia profunda Markgr.

Synonyms
- Heterotypic Synonyms: Kopsia terengganensis L.Allorge & Wiart

Species of plant

Kopsia profunda is a species of flowering plant in the family Apocynaceae. It is endemic to Peninsular Malaysia.
