= Paigham =

- Poster
- Directed by: S. S. Vasan
- Written by: Ramanand Sagar (dialogues)
- Produced by: Nagi Reddy
- Starring: Dilip Kumar; Vyjayanthimala; Raaj Kumar; B. Saroja Devi
- Cinematography: P. Elappa
- Music by: C. Ramchandra
- Production company: Gemini Studios
- Release date: 30 October 1959
- Country: India
- Language: Hindi

Paigham (transl. Message) is a 1959 Indian Hindi-language drama film directed by S. S. Vasan. The film stars Dilip Kumar, Vyjayanthimala in the lead roles, with Raaj Kumar, Pandari Bai, B. Saroja Devi, Motilal and Johnny Walker in other important roles. The film's music was composed by C. Ramchandra. This was the first time Dilip Kumar and Raaj Kumar appeared in a film together. They later appeared together once again over three decades later for the 1991 film Saudagar. The film was declared a blockbuster at box office.

The film was later remade in Tamil as Irumbu Thirai by Vasan, with Vyjayanthimala and Saroja Devi reprising their roles.

== Plot ==
The movie traces the lives of the family of a widowed lady, her two sons and daughter.

Mrs. Lal, a widowed lady lives with her two sons, Ram and Ratan, her unmarried daughter, Sheela; Ram's wife, Parvati, and her children. Ram works in a mill and Ratan is studying engineering in Calcutta. When Ratan returns, he is offered a job at the same mill, and falls in love with a typist named Manju, much to the chagrin of Malti, the daughter of the mill owner, Sewakram.

When Ratan finds out that Sewakram has been defrauding the mill employees, he decides to form a union, a move that is opposed by his brother Ram, who is devoted and loyal to Sewakram. Things go from bad to worse when the workers decide to go on strike, while Ram decides to throw Ratan out of the house. Word gets around that Ratan is against Sewakram, and soon he gets blacklisted.

Sheela who was supposed to marry Kundan, the son of Sitaram, has her marriage cancelled, and the family loses their prestige and credit in the community.

The question remains, will the workers continue to be at the mercy of Sewakram, and will the Lal family be re-united again and is answered during the latter half of the movie.

== Cast ==
- Dilip Kumar as Ratan Lal
- Vyjayanthimala as Manju
- Raaj Kumar as Ram Lal
- Pandari Bai as Parvati
- Motilal as Seth Sevakram
- B. Saroja Devi as Malti
- Johnny Walker as Nandu
- Minoo Mumtaz as Chhallo
- Vasundhara Devi as Manju's Mother
- Pratima Devi as Mrs. Lal
- S. N. Banerjee as Mill Manager
- Mukherjee as Inspector
- Shivraj as Seetaram
- Seetalaxmi as Sheela
- Ishwarlal as Jeevan
- Pushpamala as Kamla
- Master Gopi as Bhola
- Kurupaiah as Kundan
- Radha as Seth's Wife
- Madhavan as Sleuth
- Amar as Prosecutor
- Kamal Krishna as Judge

== Soundtrack ==
All songs were music by C. Ramchandra and lyrics by Pradeep.

Song	Singer
"Yahi Paigham Hamara"	Manna Dey
"Daulat Ne Paseene Ko Aaj"	C. Ramchandra
"O Ameeron Ke Parmeshwar"-1	Asha Bhosle
"O Ameeron Ke Parmeshwar"-2	Asha Bhosle
"Main Kyun Na Nachoon Aaj"	Asha Bhosle
"Hum Rang Rangeeli Yauwan van ki Tittaliya Re"	Asha Bhosle, Suman Kalyanpur
"Jawani Mein Akelepan Ki Ghadiyan Humko Na Bhaye"	Asha Bhosle, Mohammed Rafi
"Badla Sara Zamana Babu, Badla Sara Zamana"	Asha Bhosle, Mohammed Rafi
"Kaise Diwali Manayen Hum"	Mohammed Rafi
"Suno, Suno Re Bhaiya"	Mohammed Rafi

== Accolades ==
At the 7th Filmfare Awards, Ramanand Sagar won the Filmfare Award for Best Dialogue, Raaj Kumar was nominated for Best Supporting Actor, and Dilip Kumar was nominated for Best Actor.
