= Kopsia rajangensis =

Conservation status
- Data Deficient (IUCN 3.1)

Scientific classification
- Kingdom: Plantae
- Clade: Embryophytes
- Clade: Tracheophytes
- Clade: Spermatophytes
- Clade: Angiosperms
- Clade: Eudicots
- Clade: Asterids
- Order: Gentianales
- Family: Apocynaceae
- Genus: Kopsia
- Species: K. rajangensis

Binomial name
- Kopsia rajangensis D.J.Middleton

Species of plant

Kopsia rajangensis is a tree in the family Apocynaceae. The specific epithet rajangensis refers to the Rajang River in Borneo, near which the species was initially surveyed.

== Description ==
Kopsia rajangensis grows as a shrub or small tree up to 5 m (16 ft) tall. Its flowers feature a white corolla.

== Distribution and habitat ==
Kopsia rajangensis is endemic to Borneo, where it is confined to Sarawak. Its habitat is hill forests.
