= Kopsia dasyrachis =

Conservation status
- Least Concern (IUCN 3.1)

Scientific classification
- Kingdom: Plantae
- Clade: Embryophytes
- Clade: Tracheophytes
- Clade: Spermatophytes
- Clade: Angiosperms
- Clade: Eudicots
- Clade: Asterids
- Order: Gentianales
- Family: Apocynaceae
- Genus: Kopsia
- Species: K. dasyrachis

Binomial name
- Kopsia dasyrachis Ridl.

Species of flowering plant

Kopsia dasyrachis is a tree in the family Apocynaceae. It is native to Borneo.

== Description ==
Kopsia dasyrachis grows up to 10 m (30 ft) tall, with a trunk diameter of up to 15 cm (6 in). The bark is grey or yellow. Its flowers feature a white corolla.

== Distribution and habitat ==
Kopsia dasyrachis is endemic to Borneo, where it is known only from Sabah. Its habitat is lowland forests from sea level to 900 m (3,000 ft) altitude.
