= Kopsia sleesiana =

Conservation status
- Vulnerable (IUCN 2.3)

Scientific classification
- Kingdom: Plantae
- Clade: Tracheophytes
- Clade: Angiosperms
- Clade: Eudicots
- Clade: Asterids
- Order: Gentianales
- Family: Apocynaceae
- Genus: Kopsia
- Species: K. sleesiana

Binomial name
- Kopsia sleesiana Markgraf

Species of plant

Kopsia sleesiana is a species of plant in the family Apocynaceae. It is endemic to the Sarawak region of Malaysia, on the island of Borneo.
