= Vasundhara Devi =

Indian actress

- Vasundhara in a still from one of her early movies
- Born: 1917; Madras, Madras Presidency, British India (now Chennai, Tamil Nadu, India)
- Died: 1988 (aged 70–71)
- Occupations: Actress, Indian classical dancer
- Years active: 1941–1960
- Known for: Mangamma Sapatham
- Spouse: M. D. Raman (divorced 1946)
- Children: Vyjayanthimala

Vasundhara Devi (1917–1988) was an Indian actress, trained Bharathanatyam dancer and carnatic singer. The Indian actress Vyjayanthimala is her daughter.

== Early life and background ==
Vasundhara Devi was born to M. N. Srinivasan and Yadugiri Devi into a Tamil-speaking family of Mandyam Iyengars. Her father worked at the Imperial Bank of India and also occasionally performed comedic roles in amateur stage plays. According to Vyjayanthimala in her autobiography, Bonding...A Memoir, he held strongly patriarchal views and ensured that the women of his family were restricted to domestic roles.

Despite her father's disapproval, Vasundhara pursued music and dance with the support of her mother. She learnt Carnatic music under several teachers, including Manakkal Sivaraja Iyer and the eminent vocalist Ariyakudi Ramanuja Iyengar. Simultaneously, she also trained in Hindustani classical music from Pandit Narayan Rao Vyas.

== Music and stage career ==
Vasundhara's father didn't permit her to perform publicly on stage and confined her to exclusive private concerts. But, this didn't stop her music from gaining recognition, especially in the Mysore state. The then Yuvaraja of Mysore, Krishna Rajendra Wodeyar IV, organized a European trip in 1939 with a cultural delegation of about 78 Indian artistes and musicians, including Vasundhara. She attended the delegation with her husband, her mother, and her 6-year-old daughter, Vyjayanthimala.

During the tour, the group had an audience with Pope Pius XII at the Vatican, where Vyjayanthimala was even chosen to perform Bharatanatyam for the Pope. To date, Vasundhara is regarded as the only Indian actress to have had an audience with a Pope of the Roman Catholic Church.

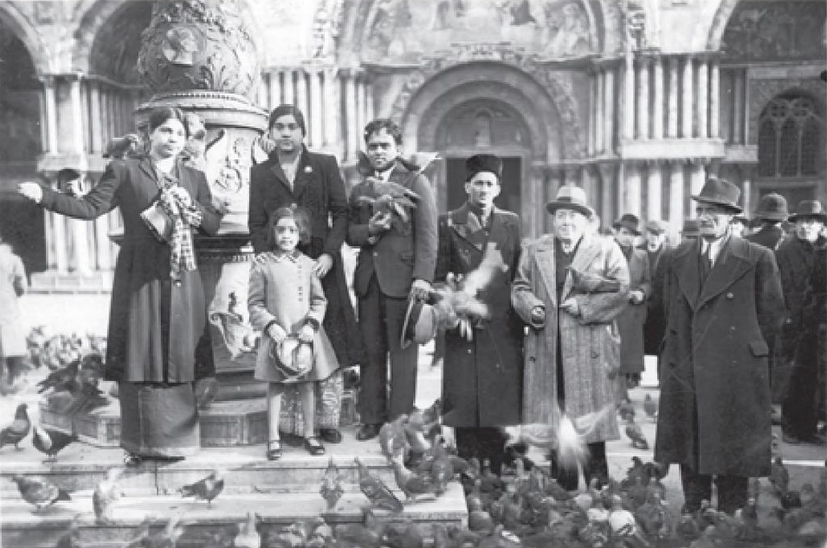
Vasundhara Devi with the 6-year-old Vyjayanthimala, her husband M. D. Raman (to her right) and her mother Yadugiri Devi (to the left) at Venice during the European trip, 1939

== Film career ==
As her popularity through frequent music concerts and records increased, Vasundhara began receiving film offers. She signed her first film, Rishyasringar, opposite Ranjan, who was also making his acting debut with the film. The film was released in 1941 and was received well for its music and Vasundhara's impressive performances.

Her next film, Mangamma Sabatham, with the same co-actor, was released in the July of 1943 and went on to become a blockbuster, often being cited as the first major Gemini studios-Vasan hit. Vasundhara was widely appreciated for her melodious songs and dance numbers.

At the height of her fame, she was signed to star opposite M. K. Thyagaraja Bhagavathar for the film Udayanan Vasavadatta. Bhagavathar, however, was replaced by the popular Carnatic musician G. N. Balasubramaniam in the lead role, following the former's arrest for his alleged involvement in the sensational Lakshmikanthan murder case in 1945. The portions filmed with Bhagavathar were abandoned and reshot while Vasundhara retained her role as the hero's love interest, Vasavadatta. Despite its excellent filmography by Marcus Bartley, and renditions by GNB and Vasundhara, the film did not fare well. Then, she went on to play the role of Shanthala in the film Natyarani, released in the year 1949. After some initial portions and dance sequences were shot, Vasundhara opted out of the film for undisclosed reasons. Since the budget-minded producer and the director chose not to abandon these reels, the film's story was reworked to allow another actress to play the remaining portions while retaining Vasundhara's scenes. The dancer-actress B. S. Saroja subsequently took over the role. This film marked her final appearance as a lead actress, following which she returned years later in supporting roles, for Gemini studio's Paigham (1959) and Irumbu Thirai (1960), playing the mother of the character played by her daughter, Vyjayanthimala.

== Personal life and death ==
According to family customs, Vasundhara was married at a very young age to her relative Mandyam Dhati Raman, a civil engineer. She was only 16 years old when she gave birth to their only daughter, Vyjayanthimala. According to Vyjayanthimala, they grew up almost like sisters owing to the small age gap. The couple separated in 1946 following marital disputes.

In August 1946, Vasundhara filed a case in the Madras High Court seeking custody of her daughter, alleging that the minor had been wrongfully taken from her residence by her father while she was away for work. Raman argued that he was the more suitable guardian, citing Vasundhara's demanding professional commitments. Vasundhara's mother, Yadugiri Devi, supported Raman's position. The case continued through several hearings between 1946 and 1950, and was highly publicized. In September 1950, the court granted Raman primary control over his daughter's career and finances while permitting limited visiting rights to Vasundhara. This prolonged conflict is said to have strained her relationship with her mother and her daughter.

Vasundhara later remarried a family friend, but not much information about him and this alliance is publicly available. She died in the year 1988, aged 71.

== Filmography ==
Year	Title	Role	Notes	Source
1941	Rishyasringar (1941 film)	Maya	Debut film	
1943	Mangamma Sabatham (1943 film)	Mangamma	Played the titular role. The film was a blockbuster and is often cited as the first of many hits produced by Gemini studios. It was remade in Telugu, Hindi and Sinhala languages.	
1947	Udayanan Vasavadatta	Princess Vasavadatta		
1949	Naattiya Rani	Shanthala	Devi left the film midway due to unknown reasons and actress B.S.Saroja replaced her for the rest of the story	
1959	Paigham	Manju's mother	Played the mother to her real life daughter, Vyjayanthimala. It is also Vasundhara's only hindi film	
1960	Irumbu Thirai (1960 film)	Jayanthi's mother	Tamil remake of Paigham where Vasundhara reprised her role as Vyjayanthimala's mother	
