= Kopsia tenuis =

Conservation status
- Endangered (IUCN 3.1)

Scientific classification
- Kingdom: Plantae
- Clade: Tracheophytes
- Clade: Angiosperms
- Clade: Eudicots
- Clade: Asterids
- Order: Gentianales
- Family: Apocynaceae
- Genus: Kopsia
- Species: K. tenuis

Binomial name
- Kopsia tenuis Leenh. & Steenis

Species of plant

Kopsia tenuis is a species of plant in the family Apocynaceae. It is a tree endemic to the Sarawak region of Malaysia, on the island of Borneo.
