= Udayanan Vasavadatta =

- Poster
- Directed by: T. R. Raghunath
- Written by: Udayakumar; A. S. A. Sami (dialogues)
- Story by: Raja Chandrasekhar
- Produced by: R. M. Ramanathan
- Starring: Vasundhara Devi; G. N. Balasubramaniam; M. S. Saroja; D. Balasubramaniam; K. Sarangapani; Kali N. Rathnam
- Cinematography: Marcus Bartley
- Edited by: A. Kasilingam; S. A. Murugesan
- Music by: C. R. Subburaman
- Production company: Uma Pictures
- Distributed by: Uma Pictures
- Release date: 21 June 1947 (India)
- Country: India
- Language: Tamil

Udayanan Vasavadatta is a 1947 Tamil language film directed and produced by T. R. Raghunath. The film stars Vasundhara Devi, G. N. Balasubramaniam and M. S. Saroja with D. Balasubramaniam, K. Sarangapani and Kali N. Rathnam playing supporting roles.

== Plot ==
Udayanan (Balasubramaniam), the king of Vatsa, meets Vasavadatta (Vasundhara Devi) and the two fall in love. Udayanan is presented a divine Elephant by Indra, which leaves him due to a sin he commits. He goes on a quest in search of it, leaving behind Vasavadatta in another kingdom where she teaches music and dance. During his search, a rival king imprisons him by luring him into his kingdom with an Elephant made of precious stones. While Udayanan is imprisoned, another rival king attacks his kingdom. Udayanan, after facing many hurdles and crises, succeeds in defeating both his rivals and happily reunites with Vasavadatta.

== Cast ==
Adapted from Film News Anandan and The Hindu

- Vasundhara Devi as Vasavadatta
- G. N. Balasubramaniam as Udayanan
- M. S. Saroja
- D. Balasubramaniam
- K. Sarangapani
- Kali N. Rathnam
- C. T. Rajakantham
- N. Krishnamurthy
- P. S. Veerappa
- T. K. Sampangi
- M. V. Mani
- Kolathu Mani
- T. T. Arasu
- V. Nataraja Iyer
- K. N. Kamalam
- K. N. Rajam
- N. Nagasubramaniam

== Production ==
R. M. Ramanathan produced Udayanan Vasavadatta under his own banner, Uma Pictures. Initially, M. K. Thyagaraja Bhagavathar was to do the role of Udayanan. Bhagavathar even had sung some songs and some scenes were shot for the film featuring him, but due to his conviction in the Lakshmikanthan murder case, all of the scenes he had shot and the songs he had recorded were abandoned. Bhagavathar was subsequently replaced with G. N. Balasubramaniam.

The film's cinematography was by Marcus Bartley while F. Nagoor and M. Natesan, who later became a producer himself, were in charge of the set and costume designing respectively. The songs were co-choreographed by V. B. Ramaiah Pillai and Kamini Kumar Sinha.

== Soundtrack ==
The film's music and score composed by C. R. Subburaman while Papanasam Sivan and Kambadasan wrote the lyrics for the songs. Both Balasubramaniam and Vasundhara Devi sang a few songs for the film.

== Reception ==
Wiring for The Hindu, film critic and historian Randor Guy noted that the film was remembered for "GNB's captivating songs, Vasundhara's dances and excellent cinematography." Udayanan Vasavadatta did not perform well at the box office.
