= T. G. Raghavachari =

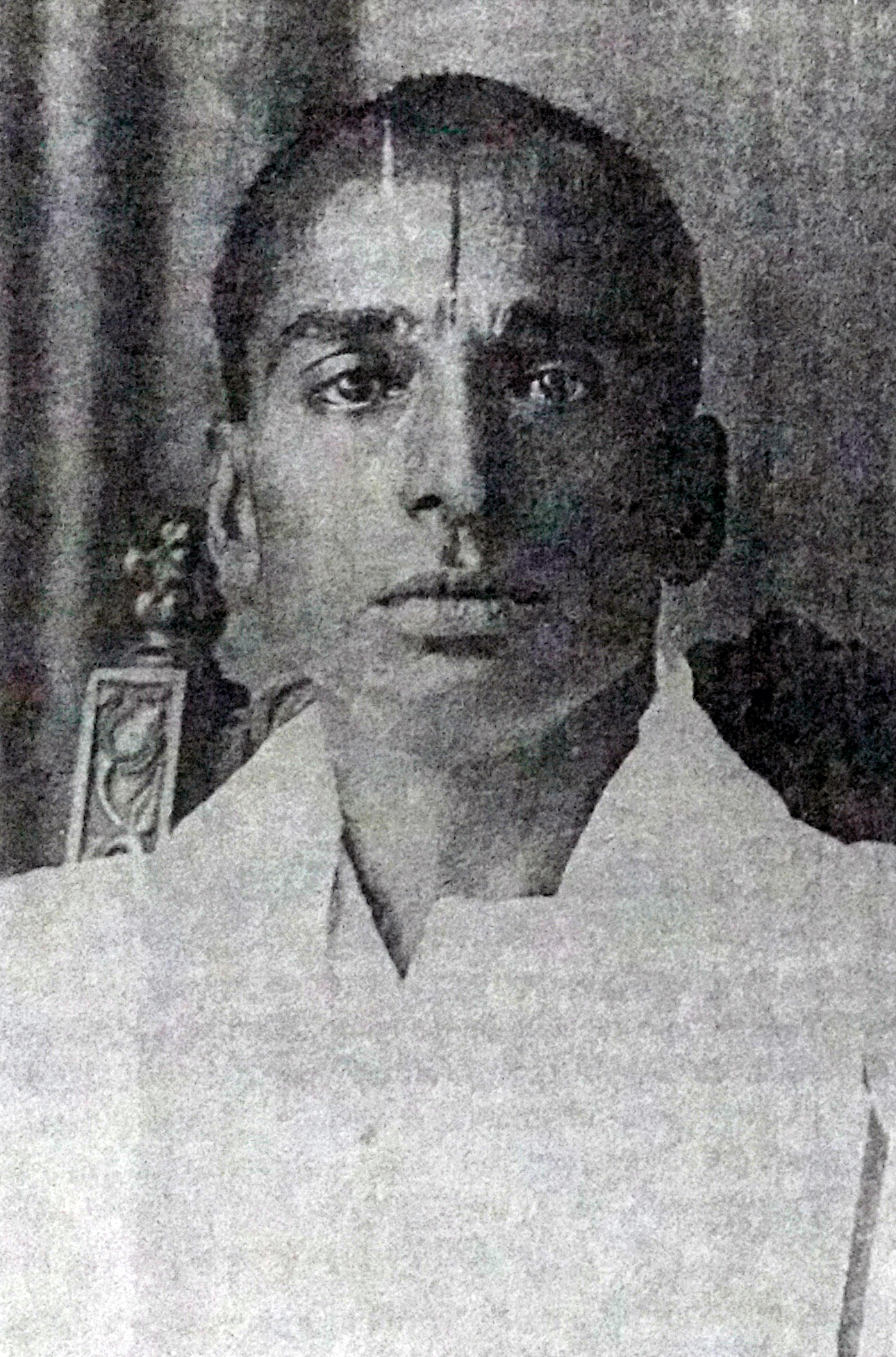
- Born: Thoothukudi Govindachari Raghavachari
- Other name: Acharya
- Occupations: Filmmaker; Lawyer
- Spouse: Rajalakshmi
- Children: T. R. Govindachari

Thoothukudi Govindachari Raghavachari, also known by his initials TGR and the pseudonym Acharya, was an Indian filmmaker and lawyer who was active in Tamil cinema in the 1940s and 1950s.

== Early and personal life ==
Thoothukudi Govindachari Raghavachari, nicknamed TGR, was born into an Iyengar family. A scholar in Sanskrit and English, he was a lawyer in the Madras High Court, and had in-depth knowledge of fine arts. Raghavachari was married to Rajalakshmi, and the two had a son T. R. Govindachari.

== Career ==
Due to cinema being considered taboo in India at the time, Raghavachari worked anonymously and uncredited in films. He wrote the screenplay for Ratnavalli (1935), based on a play by Pammal Sambandha Mudaliar. He was also involved in the writing and direction of Rishyasringar (1941), although the credit of directing went only to producer S. Soundararajan. The first film where Raghavachari worked with credit was Gemini Studios' Mangamma Sabatham (1943), produced by S. S. Vasan, although he was credited as "Acharya". He was later signed on to direct another Gemini film Chandralekha (1948), although Raghavachari shot a large portion of the film, differences with Vasan led to him quitting and Vasan taking over direction. Nonetheless, the film became a success, and the two reunited for Apoorva Sagodharargal (1949), where Raghavachari was again credited as "Acharya" to maintain anonymity. He later began directing Kalyani (1952) for Modern Theatres, although cinematographer M. Masthan later took over after Raghavachari contracted tuberculosis; both men received director's credit. Raghavachari also co-wrote Doctor Savithri (1955), directed by R. M. Krishnaswamy.

== Illness and death ==
Raghavachari retired from the film industry due to health issues. He died in the early 1960s after suffering from years of tuberculosis.

== Filmography ==
- Ratnavalli (1935)
- Mangamma Sabatham (1943)
- Chandralekha (1948)

== Bibliography ==
- Guy, Randor (1997). Starlight, Starbright: The Early Tamil Cinema. Chennai: Amra Publishers. OCLC 52794531.
