= Kopsia larutensis =

Conservation status
- Vulnerable (IUCN 3.1)

Scientific classification
- Kingdom: Plantae
- Clade: Embryophytes
- Clade: Tracheophytes
- Clade: Spermatophytes
- Clade: Angiosperms
- Clade: Eudicots
- Clade: Asterids
- Order: Gentianales
- Family: Apocynaceae
- Genus: Kopsia
- Species: K. larutensis

Binomial name
- Kopsia larutensis King & Gamble

Species of plant

Kopsia larutensis is a species of flowering plant in the family Apocynaceae. It is a shrub or tree endemic to northwestern Peninsular Malaysia. It grows in lowland dipterocarp rain forest up to 200 m elevation in the Malaysian states of Perak and Kedah.
