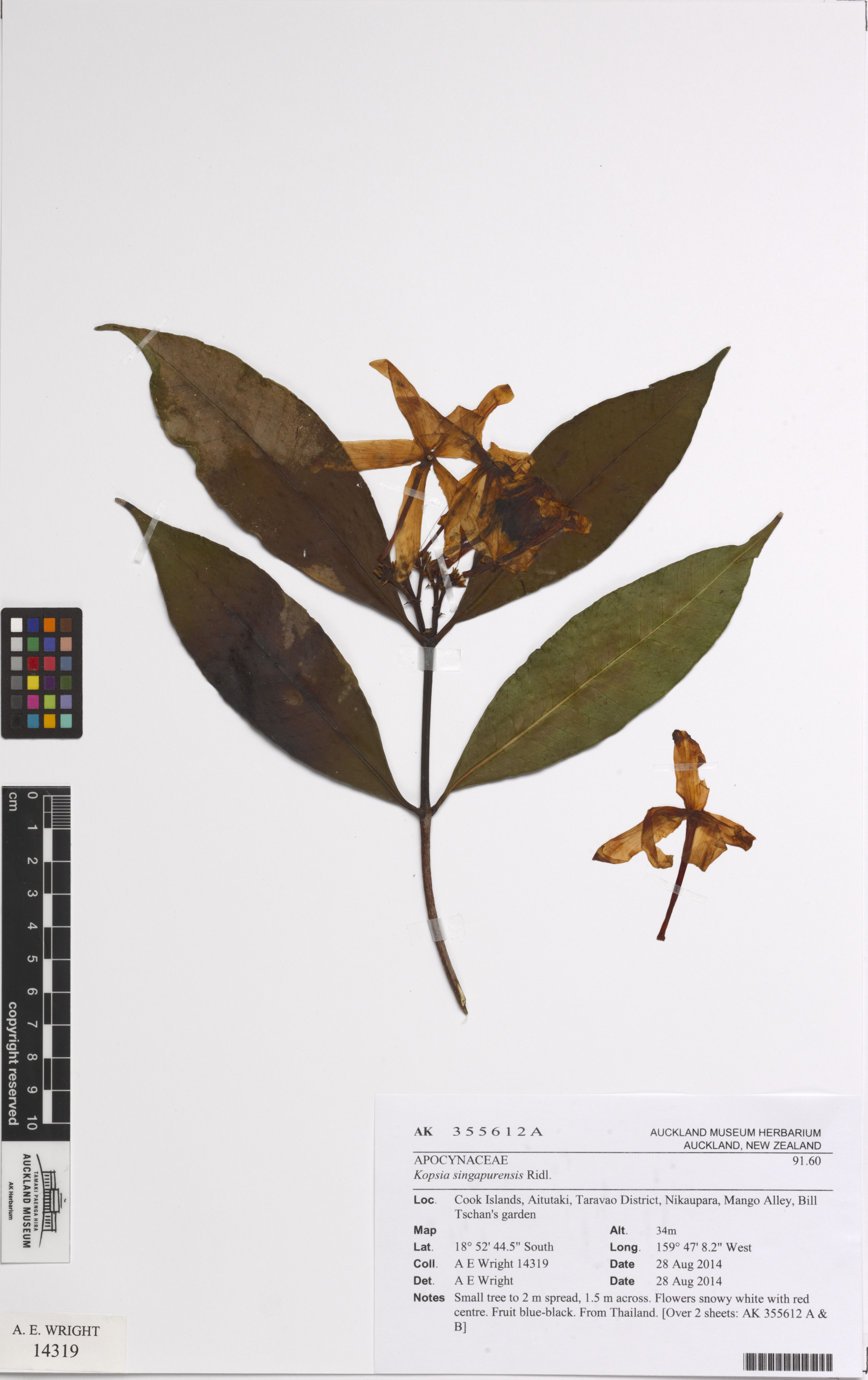

Conservation status
- Vulnerable (IUCN 2.3)

Scientific classification
- Kingdom: Plantae
- Clade: Embryophytes
- Clade: Tracheophytes
- Clade: Angiosperms
- Clade: Eudicots
- Clade: Asterids
- Order: Gentianales
- Family: Apocynaceae
- Genus: Kopsia
- Species: K. singapurensis

Binomial name
- Kopsia singapurensis Ridl.

Synonyms
- Kopsia singaporensis common misspelling

= Kopsia singapurensis =

Species of plant

Kopsia singapurensis (also called white kopsia) is a species of plant in the family Apocynaceae. It is native to Peninsular Malaysia and Singapore. It is threatened by habitat loss. It can grow up to five metres tall. When the plant is cut, white latex is produced. The flower has five petals. In Singapore, the tree can only be found in the Nee Soon Swamp Forest. In the wild, it flowers only twice a year, but when cultivated, it is free-flowering if grown under the right conditions.
