= Natyarani =

- Theatrical release poster
- Directed by: B. N. Rao
- Written by: Kambadasan
- Story by: Kambadasan
- Starring: Vasundhara Devi; B. S. Raja Ayyangar; B. S. Saroja; T. S. Balaiah
- Music by: Papanasam Sivan
- Production company: Baskar Pictures
- Release date: 19 August 1949
- Running time: 15,200 ft.
- Country: India
- Language: Tamil

Natyarani (transl. Dance Queen) is a 1949 Tamil-language dance film starring Vasundhara Devi, B. S. Saroja, K. Thavamani Devi and T. S. Balaiah.

== Plot ==
A swamy (hermit) teaches fine arts like music and dance from his Ashram in a village to students. A young girl named Shanthala from the villages brings him milk every day. May be due to her seeing students training in music and dance in the ashram, Shanthala had a strange dream in which she becomes very famous. Shanthala tells about her dream to a close friend, Veni who laughs it off. But Shanthala believes in her dream and starts worshipping Lord Shiva in a temple located outside the village. Lord Shiva appears to her and grants her wish. In the meantime, the king of Hoysala, Vishnuvardhana, visits the Swamy. Swamy was writing a treatise on Classical dance called Natya. He sings a song while the king was listening. Shanthala starts dancing to the tune of the song exhibiting the correct mudhras perfectly. The king becomes fascinated by Shanthala's dance movements. He meets Shanthala privately and marries her by exchanging rings. He tells her that he will take her to the palace on an auspicious day. However, the king did not tell Shanthala that he is already married. After waiting, Shanthala goes to the palace only to find there is already a queen there. The queen, on learning about Shanthala, tries to poison and kill Shanthala. How Shanthala escapes and then joins the king forms the rest of the story.

== Cast ==
- Vasundhara Devi as Shanthala
- B. S. Raja Ayyangar as Swamy
- B. S. Saroja as Shanthala
- T. S. Balaiah
- M. L. Pathi Krishna Bai as Veni
- K. Rajamani as King Vishnuvarhana
- B. Jayamma as
- K. Thavamani Devi
- Bombay Charlie
- Navaneetham
- Lalitha-Padmini (Dance)

== Production ==
The film was produced by Baskar Pictures. and was directed by B. N. Rao while the story and dialogues were written by Kambadasan. V. Madhavan was in charge of Choreography. A notable feature in the production of this film is that one single character is done by two different artistes. It so happened when production began, Vasundhara Devi was acting the role of Shanthala. Several scenes and dances had been shot with her. But she left the film in the middle for some unknown reason. Then B. S. Saroja acted in the remaining scenes. However, the director did not want to abandon the shots made with Vasundhara Devi. He and the screenplay writer came upon a brilliant idea to change the person without losing the earlier shots. The story was re-written to say that the original Shathala died in a fire accident but her spirit entered another body and continued to live as Shanthala, though the physical features have changed. It was considered a plausible explanation that people accepted in those days.

== Soundtrack ==
Music was composed by Papanasam Sivan who also wrote the lyrics. Some lyrics were penned by S. Rajaram. Playback singers are D. K. Pattammal and Kothamangalam Seenu. K. Thavamani Devi who acted in a minor role, sang a song.
