= Kopsia pauciflora =

Scientific classification
- Kingdom: Plantae
- Clade: Tracheophytes
- Clade: Angiosperms
- Clade: Eudicots
- Clade: Asterids
- Order: Gentianales
- Family: Apocynaceae
- Genus: Kopsia
- Species: K. pauciflora

Binomial name
- Kopsia pauciflora Hook.f.

Synonyms
- Of var. mitrephora: Kopsia mitrephora Sleesen; Of var. pauciflora: Kopsia alba Ridl. ex M.R.Hend.; Kopsia caudata Merr.; Kopsia lancifolia Markgr.; Kopsia parvifolia Merr.

Species of plant

Kopsia pauciflora is a tree in the family Apocynaceae. The specific epithet pauciflora means 'few-flowered'.

== Description ==
Kopsia pauciflora grows up to 10 metres (30 ft) tall, with a trunk diameter of up to 15 centimetres (6 in). The bark is grey, olive-brown or white. Its flowers feature a white corolla, sometimes with yellow or green. The fruits are black when ripe.

== Varieties ==
As of February 2023, Plants of the World Online accepted two varieties:

- Kopsia pauciflora var. mitrephora (Sleesen) D.J.Middleton – Borneo
- Kopsia pauciflora var. pauciflora – Borneo, Cambodia, Peninsular Malaysia and Singapore, Sumatra, and Thailand

== Distribution and habitat ==
Kopsia pauciflora is native to Thailand, Cambodia, Peninsular Malaysia, Singapore, Sumatra and Borneo. Its habitat is forests from sea level to 700 metres (2,300 ft) altitude.

== Conservation ==
Kopsia lancifolia was assessed as "vulnerable" in the 1998 IUCN Red List, where it is said to be native only to Sabah on the island of Borneo. As of February 2023, K. lancifolia was regarded as a synonym of Kopsia pauciflora var. pauciflora, which has a much wider distribution.
