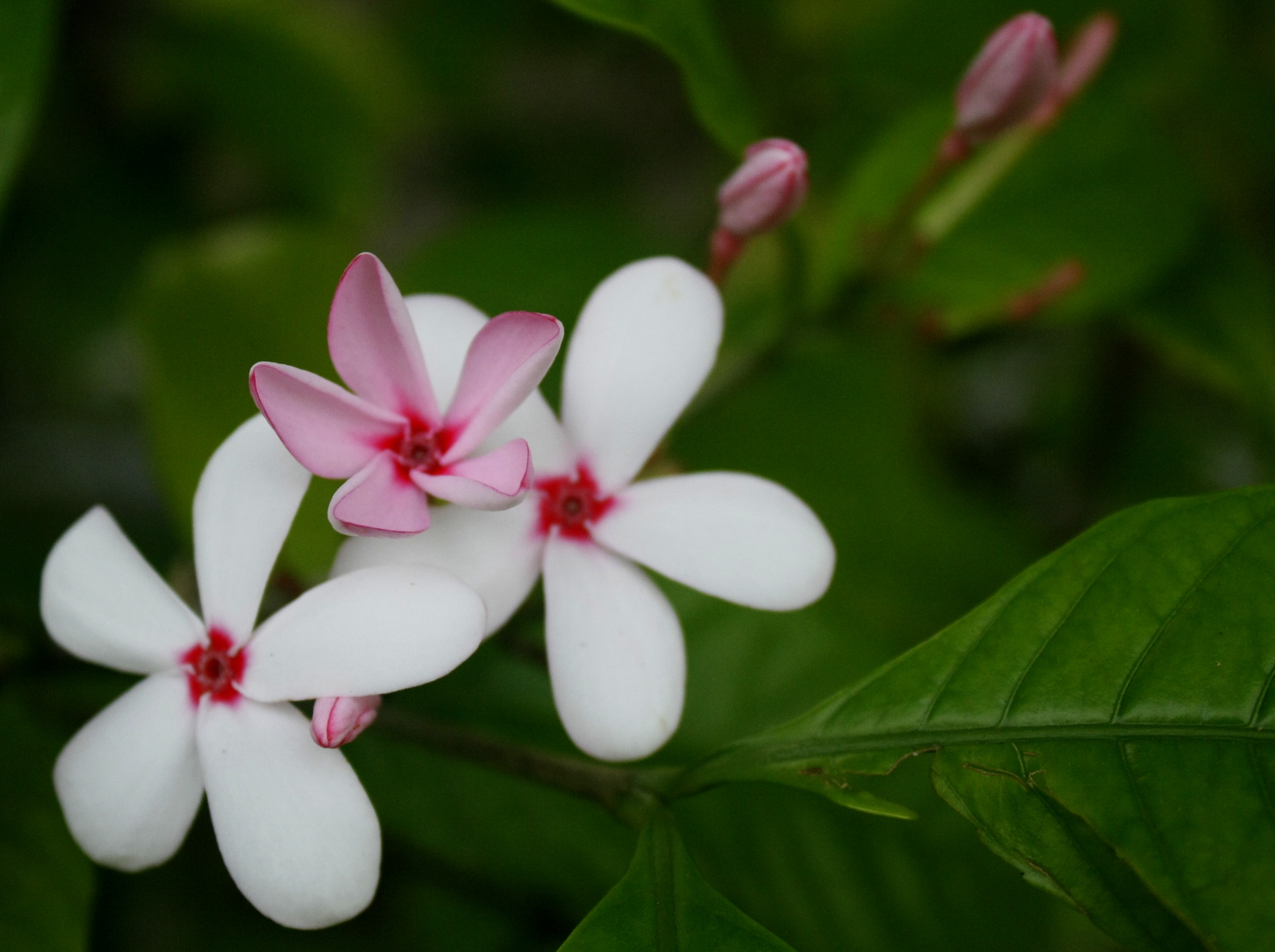
- Kopsia fruticosa

Scientific classification
- Kingdom: Plantae
- Clade: Tracheophytes
- Clade: Angiosperms
- Clade: Eudicots
- Clade: Asterids
- Order: Gentianales
- Family: Apocynaceae
- Subfamily: Rauvolfioideae
- Tribe: Vinceae
- Subtribe: Kopsiinae; Leeuwenb.
- Genus: Kopsia; Blume

Synonyms
- Kentrochrosia K.Schum. & Lauterb.

= Kopsia =

Genus of flowering plants

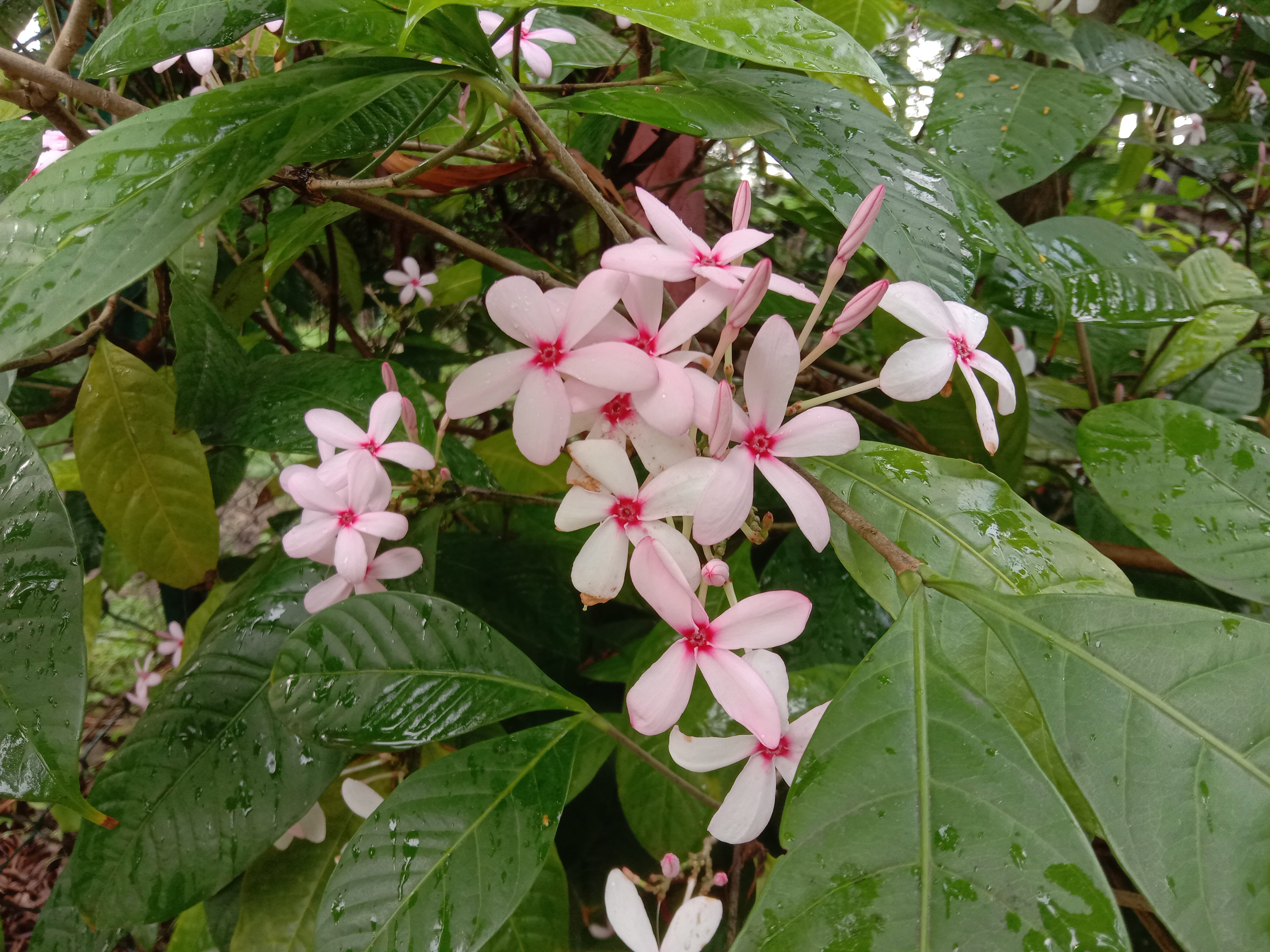
Flowers of Kopsia fruticosa

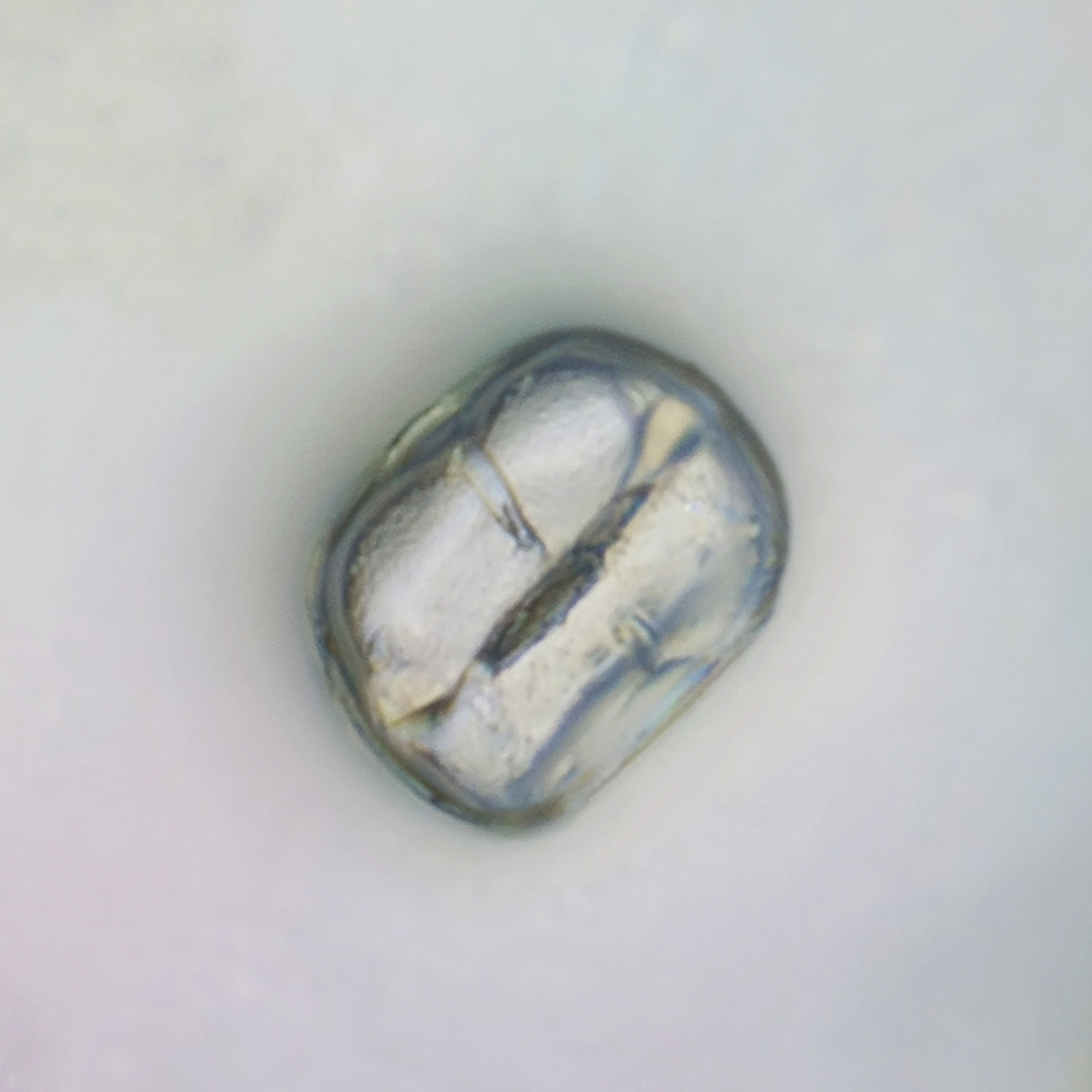
Pollen grain of Pink Kopsia

Kopsia is a genus of plants in the family Apocynaceae. It was first described as a genus in 1823. Kopsia is native to China, Southeast Asia, Australia, and various islands of the western Pacific.

== Species ==
As of November 2024, Plants of the World Online accepts the following 25 species:

- Kopsia angustipetala Kerr – Thailand, Laos
- Kopsia arborea Blume – S China, SE Asia, N Australia, Andaman & Nicobar Is
- Kopsia dasyrachis Ridl. – Sabah
- Kopsia deverrei L.Allorge – Johor
- Kopsia flavida Blume – Philippines, Maluku, New Guinea, Solomon Is, Vanuatu, Micronesia
- Kopsia fruticosa (Roxb.) A.DC. – Myanmar, Andaman Is
- Kopsia grandifolia D.J.Middleton – Johor, Anambas Is
- Kopsia griffithii King & Gamble – W Malaysia
- Kopsia hainanensis Tsiang – Hainan
- Kopsia harmandiana Pierre ex Pit. – Vietnam
- Kopsia lapidilecta Sleesen – Natuna Is
- Kopsia larutensis King & Gamble – W Malaysia
- Kopsia macrophylla Hook.f. – W Malaysia
- Kopsia obscura D.J.Middleton
- Kopsia pauciflora Hook.f. – Indochina, W Malaysia, Sumatra
- Kopsia profunda King & Gamble – W Malaysia
- Kopsia rajangensis D.J.Middleton – Sarawak
- Kopsia rosea D.J.Middleton – S Thailand, Kelantan
- Kopsia singapurensis Ridl. – Singapore, W Malaysia
- Kopsia sleesiana Markgraf – Sarawak
- Kopsia sumatrana D.J.Middleton – Sumatra
- Kopsia tenuis Leenh. & Steenis – Sarawak
- Kopsia teoi L.Allorge – W Malaysia
- Kopsia tonkinensis Pit. – Vietnam
- Kopsia vidalii D.J.Middleton – Vietnam
