= Rishyasringar (1941 film) =

Rishya Sringar
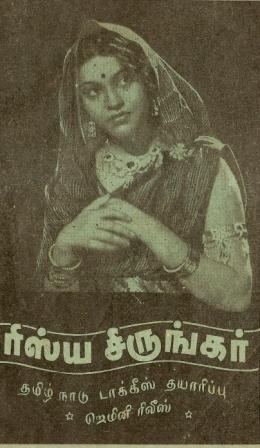
- Directed by: S. Soundararajan
- Starring: Vasundhara Devi, Ranjan
- Music by: Sarma Brothers; V. Nagayya
- Production company: Tamil Nadu Talkies
- Release date: 1941
- Country: India
- Language: Tamil

Rishyasringar is a 1941 Tamil-language film directed by S. Soundararajan. It stars Vasundhara Devi, Ranjan and S. Balachander. The music score was provided by the Sarma Brothers and V. Nagayya. Lyrics were written by Papanasam Rajagopala Iyer.

== Cast ==
Cast according to the songbook:

Male cast

- Balachandran as Young Rishya Sringan
- R. Ranjan B. A. as Rishya Singar
- G. Pattu Iyer as Vibandakar
- T. E. Krishnamachariar as Romapada Rajan
- K. N. Ramamurthi Iyer as Gauthamar
- R. K. Ramasami as Sudevar
- R. B. Yagneshwara Iyer as Pauthayanar
- M. S. Murugesam as Marichan
- T. V. Sethuraman as Subhagu

Female cast

- Vasundhara as Maya
- Kumari Murali as Shantha
- Kumari Rukmani as Padmini
- V. M. Pankajam as Urvasi
- K. N. Kamalam as Sudevi
