= Ranjan (actor) =

Indian actor (1918–1983)

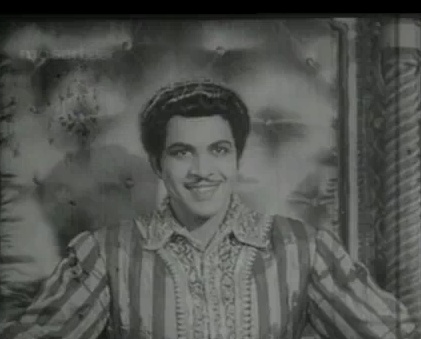
- A snapshot of Ranjan from Chandralekha (1948)
- Born: Ramanarayana Venkataramana Sarma; 2 March 1918; Madras, Madras Presidency, British India (now Chennai, Tamil Nadu, India)
- Died: 12 September 1983 (aged 65); New Jersey, United States
- Years active: 1941–1959
- Spouse: Kamala

Ranjan (born as Ramanarayana Venkataramana Sarma; 2 March 1918 – 12 September 1983) was an Indian actor, singer, journalist and writer, known for his work in Hindi and Tamil films. He debuted in the 1941 movie Ashok Kumar, but gained fame in S. S. Vasan's 1948 magnum opus Chandralekha.

== Early life ==
Ranjan was born Ramanarayana Venkataramana Sarma in Mylapore locality of present-day Chennai, Tamil Nadu on 2 March 1918. His family hailed from the town of Srirangam in present-day Tiruchirappalli district. Ranjan had his schooling in Madras and received an M. Lit degree from Madras University. While studying in college, he participated in a number of stage plays. Coincidentally, an employee of Gemini Studios, Veppattur Kittu was present at one of his plays. Impressed by Ranjan's performance, Kittu suggested his name to T. G. Raghavachari, who cast him in the M. K. Thyagaraja Bhagavathar-starrer Ashok Kumar, in which he played the role of Gautama Buddha. However, Ranjan did not have any dialogues in the film. Following the success of Ashok Kumar, Ranjan was cast in Rishyasringar, in which he played the title role of Rishyasringa. In his early movies, Ranjan was credited as "R. Ramani, B. A." The screen name "Ranjan" was actually bestowed upon him by Jithen Banerjee of Newtone Studios.

In the 1940s, Ranjan established a School of Music and Dancing, and edited an art journal entitled Natyam. He was also awarded a Rockefeller Fellowship under the International Art Program sponsored by the Institute of International Education, New York, in 1950–51. Though Ranjan acted in a number of Bollywood movies, especially costume dramas and some social movies in the 1950s and 1960s, but his star faded by the end of 1967.

His performances in blockbusters in Tamil – Mangamma Sabatham, Chandralekha, En Magal made him very famous. Due to his popularity he shifted to Hindi film industry from 1951 and was active till 1966 as hero. He is best known for his roles in Hindi films like Mangala, Sindbad The Sailor, Madari, Bahut Din Huwe, Suvarn Sundari, Nishan, Magic Carpet. His come-back attempt in Tamil movies Neelamalai Thirudan (1957) was a box office hit. But his last film Captain Ranjan (1969) flopped. He did not get much opportunity to showcase his talents especially after 1960 in Tamil films.

== Family ==
His brother R.R. Sarma, an Architect, who graduated from the JJ School of Arts in Mumbai, designed several projects for the TVS and Murugappa Groups and collaborated his wife brother sivakumar with a UN expert for a housing project in Pallikkaranai. R.R. Sarma, whose firm did not continue after his lifetime, clearly articulated what ailed the industry. "Designing houses in Madras is back-breaking and frustrating," he'd said. He took all that in his stride and went on to create the grand Madras University centenary auditorium, the stately RBI office, Victoria Technical Institute on Anna Salai and Voluntary Health Services in Taramani.

== Death ==
Ranjan died of cardiac arrest at a New Jersey hotel on 12 September 1983. He was sixty-five years old at that time.

== Partial filmography ==
Year	Film	Role	Language	Notes
1941	Ashok Kumar	Gautama Buddha	Tamil	Uncredited role
1943	Mangamma Sapatham	Sugunan, Jayapalan	Tamil	Dual roles
1945	Saalivaahanan	Saalivahanan	Tamil	
1948	Chandralekha	Sasankan	Tamil	
1948	Chandralekha	Shashank	Hindi	
1949	Nishan	Vijay Singh, Vikram Singh	Hindi	
1950	Mangala	Prince	Hindi	
1951	Mangala	Prince	Telugu	
1952	Shin Shinaki Boobla Boo	Boobla Boo	Hindi	
1954	En Magal	Raghu	Tamil	
1957	Neelamalai Thirudan	Neelamalai Thirudan	Tamil	
1958	Hum Bhi Kuchh Kam Nahin		Hindi	
1959	Madari		Hindi	
1959	Madathipathi Magal		Tamil	
1959	Minnal Veeran		Tamil	
1959	Raja Malaya Simha	Raja	Telugu	
1959	Raja Malaya Simman	Raja	Tamil	
1960	Airmail		Hindi	
1961	Jadoo Nagri		Hindi	
1961	Khiladi		Hindi	
1961	Sapera		Hindi	
1962	Sakhi Robin		Hindi	
1965	Accident		Hindi	
1969	Captain Ranjan		Tamil	Produced in 1960 but released in 1969
1978	Amar Shakti	Amar's (Shashi Kapoor) fencing guru	Hindi	
