= Kothamangalam, Tamil Nadu =

Kothamangalam
- Panchayat Town
- Location in Tamil Nadu, India
- Coordinates: 10.187397°N 78.807115°E
- Country: India
- State: Tamil Nadu
- District: Sivaganga
- Block: [Sakkottai
- Elevation: 71 m (233 ft)

Languages
  - Official: Tamil
- Time zone: UTC+5:30 (IST)
- PIN: 630105
- Telephone code: 91 4371

Kothamangalam is a panchayat town in the Sivaganga district, in the state of Tamil Nadu, India. Kothamangalam Pin code is 630105 and postal head office is Kothamangalam (Sivaganga).

== Geography ==
The latitude 10.187397 and longitude 78.8071150000001 are the geocoordinates of Kothamangalam. The capital city of Tamil Nadu, Chennai is located around 416 kilometers away from Kothamangalam. The other nearest state capital from Kothamangalam is Pondicherry and its distance is 224.6 km. The other surrounding state capitals are Thiruvananthapuram (268.2 km away), Bangalore (338.3 km away).

Kothamangalam is a village in Sakkottai Block in Sivaganga District of Tamil Nadu State, India. It is located 60 km to the north of District headquarters Sivaganga. 13 km from Sakkottai. 416 km from State capital Chennai. Kothamangalam village is located in the UTC 5.30 time zone and it follows Indian standard time (IST). Kothamangalam sun rise time varies by 16 minutes from IST.

== Demographics ==
=== Population ===
Kothamangalam Village Total population is 3551 and number of houses are 903. Female Population is 50.0%. Village literacy rate is 69.6% and the Female Literacy rate is 31.4%.

Census Parameter	Census Data
Total Population	3551
Total No of Houses	903
Female Population %	50.0 % ( 1776)
Total Literacy rate %	69.6 % ( 2473)
Female Literacy rate	31.4 % ( 1116)
Scheduled Tribes Population %	0.0 % ( 0)
Scheduled Caste Population %	7.2 % ( 256)
Working Population %	38.1 %
Child(0 -6) Population by 2011	335
Girl Child(0 -6) Population % by 2011	50.7 % ( 170)

=== Languages ===
Kothamangalam Local Language is Tamil.

== Government and politics ==
Village	Kothamangalam (கொத்தமங்கலம்)
Assembly constituency :	Tiruppattur (state assembly constituency, Sivaganga)
Lok Sabha constituency :	Sivaganga (Lok Sabha constituency)

== Transport ==
=== By Air ===
Kothamangalam's nearest airport is Tiruchirapalli International Airport situated at 64.7 km distance. Few more airports around Kothamangalam are as follows.

Tiruchirapalli International Airport	64.7 km.
Thanjavur Air Force Station	68.3 km.
Madurai Airport	87.6 km.

=== By Rail ===
The nearest railway station to Kothamangalam is Chettinad which is located in and around 4.5 kilometer distance. The following table shows other railway stations and its distance from Mamakudi.

Chettinad railway station	4.5 km.
Kothari Road railway station	5.0 km.
Tirumayam railway station	8.0 km.
Kottaiyur railway station	8.6 km.
Kandanur Puduvayal railway station	9.8 km.

== Education ==
Kothamangalam nearest schools has been listed as follows.

Pum School Nedungudi Ranji	1.8 km.
New Pum School Building Mangudi	1.8 km.
C V Ct V Meenakshi Achi School	3.4 km.
Selva S School	3.5 km.
Arunachalam Chettiyar Hr Sec School	3.6 km.

== Landmark ==
1. SI SU RAMA LENA House
2. S.M.RM House
3. Rao Bahadur House
4. Nehru Club
5. Shanmuga Vilas
6. Saradha Vilas
7. Sengathar House
8. Annamalai Illam
9. Sakthi Sai Baba Temple

== Map of Kothamangalam ==
Google Maps Kothamangalam, Sivangangai - 630105

== Adjacent communities ==
Vadagudi (7 km), Palavangudi (12 km), Sakkottai (13 km), Koviloor (16 km), Mathur (16 km) are the nearby villages to Kothamangalam. Kothamangalam is surrounded by Sakkottai Block to the south, Tirumayam Block to the north, Tiruppathur Block to the west, Thiruvarankulam Block to the north.

Karaikudi, Pudukkottai, Peravurani, Sivaganga are the nearby cities to Kothamangalam.

This place is in the border of the Sivaganga District and Pudukkottai District. Pudukkottai District Arantangi is east of this place.

The surrounding nearby villages and its distance from Kothamangalam are Chettinadu 4.0 km, Ambakkudi 17.2 km, Nattuseri 21.1 km, Sakkottai, Chockalingapuram, Sangarapuram, Jeyankondan, Nemam. Kothamangalam's nearest town/city/important place is Kanadukathan located at the distance of 3.5 kilometer. Surrounding town/city/TP/CT from Kothamangalam are as follows.

Kanadukathan	3.5 km.
Alangudi	8.0 km.
Kandanur	9.6 km.
Arimalam	11.4 km.
Karaikkudi	14.1 km.

=== Nearest districts to Kothamangalam ===
Kothamangalam is located around 50.3 kilometer away from its district headquarter sivaganga. The other nearest district headquarters is pudukkottai situated at 21.2 km distance from Kothamangalam. Surrounding districts from Kothamangalam are as follows.

Pudukkottai ( pudukkottai ) district	21.2 km.
Tiruchirappalli ( tiruchirappalli ) district	52.7 km.
Thanjavur ( thanjavur ) district	75.1 km.
Madurai ( madurai ) district	81.0 km.
