= Kothamangalam Subbu =

Indian poet and director

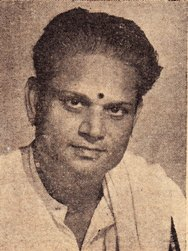
- Kothamangalam Subbu in 1948
- Born: Subbiah Mahalinga Subramanian; 10 November 1910; Kannariyenthal, Avudaiyarkoil, Madras State, British India
- Died: 15 February 1974 (aged 63)
- Known for: Actor; director; author; poet
- Spouse: M. S. Sundari Bai (m.1945-1974)
- Parent(s): S. Mahalingam Iyer, Kanagammal

Kothamangalam Subbu (born S. M. Subramanian, 10 November 1910 – 15 February 1974) was an Indian poet, lyricist, author, actor and film director based in Tamil Nadu. He wrote the cult classic Tamil novel Thillana Mohanambal and was awarded the Padma Shri, the fouth-highest civilian award in India. According to novelist Ashokamitran's memoirs, Subbu functioned as the No. 2 of the giant Gemini Studios of Madras (now Chennai), South India for over three decades and was a close associate of movie mogul S. S. Vasan, who established those studios and published the popular Tamil weekly Ananda Vikatan.

== Early life ==
Subbu was born Subramanian in the village of Kannariyenthal, near Avudaiyarkoil, Tamil Nadu. His parents were Subbiah Ganapadigal Mahalinga Iyer and Kangammal. After losing his mother when he was young, Subbu received patronage from his aunt. He could continue his studies only up to 8th grade. After marrying his kin, Subbu settled in Kothamangalam near Chettinad and worked as an accountant in a business concern. However, his interests shifted toward Tamil drama, acting, singing, and composing songs. By the late 1930s, Subbu received opportunities for acting in the then-blossoming Tamil movies in Madras.

== Career ==
Subbu directed the epic film Avvaiyar in which the great artiste of those days K. B. Sundarambal played the lead role. Ashokamitran had profiled humorously how this film took shape in the Gemini Studios. Subbu, with his wife Sundari Bai, played a minor role in the movie as the husband of an incorrigible lady who refuses to serve Avvaiyar food. Subbu also directed Kannamma En Kadhali, that featured his wife Sundari Bai. Furthermore, Subbu acted as a hero in Miss Malini that was remade in Hindi as Mr. Sampath. Miss Malini was an adaptation of the R.K. Narayan novel Mr Sampath. Dasi Aparanji was another movie in which Subbu and Sundari Bai played the leads. In addition, Subbu acted in Tamil movies Thiruneelakantar and Pava Mannippu.

As a writer, Subbu's most well-known work is Thillana Mohanambal that was transformed into a popularly and critically successful Tamil movie, starring Sivaji Ganesan and Padmini. Subbu was awarded the Padma Shri for authoring this novel, which originally appeared as a weekly serial in the Anantha Vikatan. Respected for his encyclopedic knowledge of music and satirical writing style, Subbu's tongue-in-cheek writing won the appreciation of many. He authored Rao Bahadur Singaram, Bandanallur Bama, Ponnivanathu Poonguyil, Miss Radha, and Manju Virattu (a collection of short stories).

Subbu has written several novels using the pen name of Kalaimani and penned Gandhi Mahan Kathai narrating the life of Mahatma Gandhi in folklore form. He wrote about 120 radio plays for All India Radio.

== Filmography ==
Screenwriter

- Chandralekha (1948)
- Apoorva Sagodharargal (1949)
- Avvaiyar (1953)
- Valliyin Selvan (1955)
- Vanjikottai Valiban (1958)
- Irumbu Thirai (1960)
- Motor Sundaram Pillai (1966)
- Thillana Mohanambal (1968)
- Vilaiyaattu Pillai (1970) (story only)

Director

- Kannamma En Kadhali (1945)
- Miss Malini (1947)
- Avvaiyar (1953)
- Valliyin Selvan (1955)

Lyricist

- Naam Iruvar (1947)
- Chakradhari (1948)
- Valliyin Selvan (1955)
- Aadi Perukku (1962)
- Annai (1962)
- Pazhani (1965)

Movies

- Paava Mannippu

== Legacy ==
Ananda Vikatan magazine is currently republishing the works of this writer, lyricist, director and actor. As an exponent of the traditional folk form of narrating stories in Tamil Nadu, the Villu Pattu, Kothamangalam Subbu popularised the lives of many Indian luminaries using the Villu Paatu.

Subbu's wife, Sundari Bai, was a popular film actress, known for her versatility in playing character roles in movies such as Kannamma En Kadhali, Sumathy En Sundari, Chandralekha, Bama Rukmani and Avvaiyar.

== In books ==
- Ashokamitran, a Tamil writer, recounts his years at Gemini Studios in his book “My Years with Boss”, where he mentions Kothamangalam Subbu. In NCERT Class 12th English Course Book Named “Flamingo”, the chapter “Poets and Pancakes” is an excerpt from the same book.
