= Motor Sundaram Pillai =

1966 film by S. S. Balan

- Theatrical release poster
- Directed by: S. S. Balan
- Screenplay by: Veppatthur Kittu
- Based on: Grahasti
- Produced by: S. S. Vasan
- Starring: Sivaji Ganesan; Ravichandran; Sowcar Janaki; Jayalalithaa
- Cinematography: P. Ellappa
- Edited by: M. Umanath
- Music by: M. S. Viswanathan
- Production company: Gemini Studios
- Release date: 26 January 1966
- Running time: 160 minutes
- Country: India
- Language: Tamil

Motor Sundaram Pillai is a 1966 Indian Tamil-language drama film directed by S. S. Balan and written by Veppathur Kittoo. A remake of the Hindi film Grahasti (1963), itself based on the American film The Remarkable Mr. Pennypacker (1959), the film stars Sivaji Ganesan, Ravichandran, Sowcar Janaki and Jayalalithaa. It revolves around a man who leads a double life, having two sets of families.

Motor Sundaram Pillai is the directorial debut of Balan, whose father Vasan produced the film under Gemini Studios. After Kittoo completed the screenplay, Ganesan was approached to star but declined; Vasan then produced Kittu's screenplay as Grahasti. When Ganesan saw this film, he offered to act if Kittu made a Tamil version, and was cast.

Motor Sundaram Pillai was released on 26 January 1966. The film was commercially successful, running for over 100 days in theatres.

== Plot ==
Motor Sundaram Pillai, a man known for being virtuous, leads a double life, having two sets of families, neither aware of the existence of the other.

== Cast ==
Male cast

- Sivaji Ganesan as Motor Sundaram Pillai
- Ravichandran as Mohan
- Sooryakumar as Vimala's boyfriend
- Sivakumar as Gopal
- Nagayya as Mohan's father
- Sundararajan as Gopal's father
- S. Rama Rao as Station Master
- T. S. Muthaiah
- Deviprasad
- Master S. Kumar
- Nagesh as Shambu
- C. R. Parthiban as Police
- Master C. P. Kumaran as Babu

Female cast

- Sowcar Janaki as Meenakshi
- Jayalalithaa as Mala
- Pandari Bai as Sundaram Pillai's sister
- Kanchana as Kamala
- Rajakokila as Shanthi
- Shylashri as Vimala
- Manimala as Maragadham, Sundaram’s First-Love
- Baby Savithri
- Baby Avandhi
- M. S. Sundari Bai
- Baby Padmini as Rajee
- Baby Kausalya
- Sachu as Revathy
- Padmini Priyadarshini as dancer in Rangoon

== Production ==
The 1959 American film The Remarkable Mr. Pennypacker, adapted from a play written by Liam O'Brien, which was inspired by a real life incident, was a global success, especially in Madras (now Chennai). Veppatthur Kittu of Gemini Studios wrote a screenplay based on this film (with changes made to suit regional tastes) and approached Sivaji Ganesan to act. He refused, and Gemini Studios proprietor S. S. Vasan produced Kittu's screenplay in Hindi as Grahasti (1963). When Ganesan saw this film, he offered to act if Kittu made a Tamil version. Vasan later announced the Tamil version, titled Motor Sundaram Pillai. Like Grahasti, this too featured some changes from the American film. It marked the directorial debut of Vasan's son Balan. Cinematography was handled by P. Ellappa.

== Soundtrack ==
The soundtrack album was composed by M. S. Viswanathan. In the song "Gubu Gubu Naan Engine", singer L. R. Eswari imitated engine sounds while A. L. Raghavan imitated train car sounds. The song "Maname Muruganin" is set in the Carnatic raga known as Hindolam. Lyricist Kothamangalam Subbu initially wanted it to be in Atana, but as Viswanathan wanted it to be in Hindolam, Subbu assented. The song was re-used in the Telugu film Manchi Kutumbam (1968) as "Manase Andhala Brindavanam".

Track listing
No.	Title	Lyrics	Singer(s)	Length
1.	"Kathiruntha Kangale"	Vaali	P. B. Sreenivas, P. Susheela	03:58
2.	"Kathal Endral Enna"	Kothamangalam Subbu	T. M. Soundararajan, P. Susheela	07:38
3.	"Gubu Gubu Naan Engine"	Kothamangalam Subbu	A. L. Raghavan, L. R. Eswari	03:22
4.	"Maname Muruganin"	Kothamangalam Subbu	(Radha) Jayalakshmi	01:50
5.	"Penne Maanthartham (Penmai Endra)"	Kothamangalam Subbu	Sirkazhi Govindarajan	02:17
6.	"Thulli Thulli Vilaiyada"	Vaali	P. Susheela, L. R. Eswari, Soolamangalam Rajalakshmi	02:55
Total length:				22:00

== Release and reception ==
Motor Sundaram Pillai was released on 26 January 1966. T. M. Ramachandran of Sport and Pastime wrote, "Though, up to the interval, it contains the usual quota of songs, dances, romantic chases of the young lovers and comedy [...] it grips the audience with a clever and logical twist in the story." The film was commercially successful, running for over 100 days in theatres.

== Bibliography ==
- Rajadhyaksha, Ashish; Willemen, Paul (1998) [1994]. Encyclopaedia of Indian Cinema. British Film Institute and Oxford University Press. ISBN 0-19-563579-5.
