= Hridayi Vasant Phultana =

Marathi song from the film Takatak 2

- Official song cover

Remix by Shruti Rane

from the album Takatak 2
- Language: Marathi
- Released: 17 August 2022
- Length: 4:05
- Label: Ishtar Music
- Songwriter: Jai Atre
- Composer: Varun Saket

Music video
- Hridayi Vasant Phultana on YouTube

"Hridayi Vasant Phultana" is a 2022 Indian Marathi-language song from the romantic comedy film Takatak 2, directed by Milind Kavde. Composed by Varun Saket, sung by Shruti Rane and lyrics are penned by Jai Atre. It is a remix of 1988 song of same title from Ashi Hi Banwa Banwi, composed by Arun Paudwal and written by Shantaram Nandgaonkar. The music video of the track features Iranian-German actress Elnaaz Norouzi, alongside film leads Prathamesh Parab, Pranali Bhalerao, Komal Bodkhe, Ajinkya Raut and Akshay Kelkar.

== Adaptation ==
Earlier the film was titled 'Hridayi Vasant Phultana', but as the title rights was not available makers finalised 'Takatak'. During the discussion on Takatak 2 director Milind Kawade told Reliance Entertainment team, they approached Venus Music and acquired the rights to adapt the song 'Hridayi Vasant Phulana'.

== Development ==
Elnaaz Norouzi marks her appearance in Marathi song, along with the principal cast of the film. Previously Elnaaz was appeared in India's first Netflix original series 'Sacred Games' alongside Saif Ali Khan and Nawazuddin Siddiqui. The song was launched at an event organized at Viviana Mall in Thane. She said in the event "I am very happy to get an opportunity to work in Marathi on the occasion of Takatak 2." Elnaz also opinioned that after Hindi films, she is satisfied to be involved in the remake of a popular song in Marathi. Seeing so many big names associated with this song, at first I held both my ears and lyricist Jai Atre Yani and I were fully aware that the original move and the thought behind the song should not be compromised at all.

== Release ==
The makers had earlier decided to release the 90 second song and release the entire song after the release of the film, but due to the popular demand, the makers have decided to release the entire song. The teaser was revealed on 16 August 2022 and the song was digitally released on 17 August 2022 on Ishtar Music's YouTube channel and available on all digital audio platforms.

== Credits ==
Credits adapted from YouTube.

- Song – "Hridayi Vasant Phultana"
- Director – Milind Zumber Kavde
- Choreographer – Rahul Sanjeer
- Editor – Guru Patil
- Singer – Shruti Rane
- Music – Varun Likhate
- Lyrics – Jai Atre
- Music Arranger – Manash Borthakur
- Stroke Instruments – Tapas Roy
- Live Rhythm – Prathamesh Dhumal, Shubham Salokhe
- Electric Guitar – Kandarpa Kalita
- Trumpet – Domjoe Soprano
- Additional Vocals & Dialogues – Janardhan Dhatrak, Varun Likhate Backing
- Vocals – Umesh Joshi, Janardhan Dhatrak, Shripad Lele, Vijay Dhuri
- Mixed & Mastered by – Abhishek Khandelwal (YRF Studios)
- Assistant Engineer – Dileep Nair (YRF Studios)
- Lead Vocals recorded by Ajinkya Dhapare (The Sonic Station, Mumbai)
  - Assisted by – Virat Bhushetty
- Ethnic Stroke Instruments – Partho Protim Das (Euphony Studio Guitars)
- Trumpet Recorded – Studio Strings
- Backing Vocals Recorded by – Harshul Khadse (Seven Heaven Studios)
