= Takatak 2 =

- Theatrical release poster
- Directed by: Milind Kavde
- Written by: Milind Kavde
- Produced by: Om Prakash Bhatt; Naresh Choudhary; Aditya Joshi
- Starring: Prathamesh Parab; Akshay Kelkar; Ajinkya Raut; Bhoomika Kadam; Pranali Bhalerao
- Cinematography: Hazrat Sheikh Wali
- Edited by: Guru Patil
- Music by: Varun Likhate
- Production companies: Reliance Entertainment; Purple Bull Entertainment
- Release date: 18 August 2022
- Country: India
- Language: Marathi

Takatak 2 is a 2022 Indian Marathi-language romantic comedy film directed by Milind Kavde. It is the sequel for the 2019 film Takatak. The film stars Prathamesh Parab, Akshay Kelkar, Ajinkya Raut, Bhoomika Kadam and Pranali Bhalerao. The popular song "Hridayi Vasant Phulatana" in the 1988 Marathi comedy drama film Ashi Hi Banwa Banwi was adapted with the same title, featuring Iranian-German actress Elnaaz Norouzi.

The film was theatrically released on 18 August 2022 coinciding Janmastami. The film grossed over ₹2.11 crore (US$220,000) in the first weekend of release.

== Cast ==
- Prathamesh Parab as Ganya
- Akshay Kelkar as Chandu
- Ajinkya Raut as Sharya
- Bhumika Kadamb as Mini
- Pranali Bhalerao as Kamakshi
- Komal Bodkhe as Ankita
- Mayuri Aawhad as Reena
- Tushar Mane as Kartik
- Bharat Ganeshpure Chandu's father
- Smita Dongre as Ganya's mother
- Swapnil Rajshekhar as Desai
- Kiran Mane as Chandu's father
- Sushant Divekar as Gabalya
- Pankaj Vishnu as Prof. Jondhale
- Rushi Machche as Santosh
- Akshay Jadhav as Dinesh

== Production ==
Muhurat shot and formal launch was done on 15 April 2021 in Goa, India. Principal photography began that day, as informed by the makers. On 22 April 2021, first schedule Complete. On 6 July 2021, entire shooting of the film has been wrapped up.

== Release ==
The film was theatrically released on 18 August 2022 all over Maharashtra.

== Critical reception ==
A reviewer of The Times of India wrote"You can question the content of the film, but the Takatak franchise seems to have cracked the formula for commercial success. If sex sells, then Tatatak 2 sells it with a side of heartfelt stories and lovable characters". A reviewer of Lokmat says "This film is not just a thriller, it tries to say something. Youngsters must watch this movie, but others should also watch it once".

== Soundtrack ==
Takatak 2

Soundtrack album by Varun Likhte
- Released: 2022
- Recorded: 2022
- Genre: Feature film soundtrack
- Length: 10:48
- Language: Marathi

Official audio
- Takatak 2- Full Album on YouTube

The songs are composed by Varun Likhte and the lyrics are penned by Jai Atre. The first song titled "Ghe Takatak De Takatak" was released on 26 July 2022 and second song titled "Hridayi Vasant Phultana" was released on 16 August 2022.

No.	Title	Artist(s)	Length
1.	"Ghe Takatak De Takatak"	Harwardhan Wavare, Mugdha Karhade	2:39
2.	"Lagin Ghayee"	Anand Shinde, Kavita Ram	4:08
3.	"Ghe Takatak De Takatak (extended version )"	Harshwardhan Wavare, Mugdha Karhade	4:01
Total length:			10:48
