= Suhaag Raat =

Suhaag Raat may refer to:

- Suhaag Raat (1948 film), a Hindi film of Indian cinema directed by Kidar Sharma
- Suhaag Raat (1968 film), a Hindi-language drama film produced and directed by R. Bhattacharya
