= Grahasti (film) =

1963 film by S.S.Vasan

- Film poster
- Directed by: Kishore Sahu
- Written by: S. S. Vasan; S. S. Balan; Pandit Mukhram Sharma (dialogue)
- Based on: The Remarkable Mr. Pennypacker by Henry Levin
- Produced by: S. S. Vasan
- Starring: Ashok Kumar; Manoj Kumar; Rajshree; Nirupa Roy; Mehmood
- Cinematography: P. Ellappa
- Music by: Ravi
- Production company: Gemini Pictures
- Distributed by: Rajshri Productions
- Release date: 1963
- Country: India
- Language: Hindi

Grahasti (transl. Family Life), also spelled Grihasti, is a 1963 Indian Hindi-language drama film, directed by Kishore Sahu. Produced by S. S. Vasan for Gemini Studios, its music director was Ravi and the lyrics were written by Shakeel Badayuni. Pandit Mukhram Sharma wrote the dialogues with cinematography by P. Ellappa. The film stars Ashok Kumar, Mehmood, Manoj Kumar, Rajshree, Nirupa Roy, Indrani Mukherjee, Bipin Gupta, Lalita Pawar and Gajanan Jagirdar.

Grahasti was the first film to "start the trend" of family dramas being made in South India. The story revolves around Harish Khanna (Ashok Kumar), a respected industrialist with a large brood, who is discovered to have two sets of families in different cities at the occasion of his daughter’s engagement. The effect the scandal and the secret has on him and his family forms the basis of the story. It is inspired and an adaptation of the Hollywood film ‘’The Remarkable Mr. Pennypacker’’ which in turn had been a successful broadway play based on a true incident of a bigamous trucker reported in The Reader’s Digest.

== Plot ==
Harishchandra "Harish" Khanna (Ashok Kumar) lives in a happy household consisting of his wife Maya (Nirupa Roy) and their large family of seven daughters and one son in Meerut. Also staying with them is his widowed sister (Lalita Pawar), and her son Jaggu (Mehmood). Harish spends five days of the week away from his family for work in Delhi. Harish and Maya soon have a ninth child much to Maya's consternation, as her eldest daughter, Kamla (Bharati Malvankar) who is married to Gopal is also expecting a child. The fact that Kamla is pregnant is a cause of anxiety, as according to Gopal's parents, the couple have not been together since the wedding and her pregnancy is considered as a sign of her disreputable character. Gopal is not around to give an explanation and his parents decide to send Kamla back home. Harish finds out that two of his daughters, Kiran (Rajshree) and Kamini (Indrani Mukherjee), are in love with Mohan (Manoj Kumar), the son of the College principal, and Ravindra (Soodesh Kumar) respectively, and that Jaggu is in love with Rekha (Shobha Khote). Harish decides to get the three pairs married.

Their matrimonial meeting is fixed for a Friday, the same day Harish always returns from Delhi. Harish has not arrived. Suddenly, a young lad by the name of Sundar appears. He is looking for Harish. He explains that Harish is his father and he desperately needs to see his father to ask for money for his school fees. Not long after, Harish appears and the situation turns chaotic. One thing leads to another to the extent of affecting the marriage of Kamla and Gopal.

When Kamla is accompanied by her in-laws back to her parents', Harish loses his cool and he is forced to break his promise to one person he respects the most; his father-in-law, Sundar's maternal grandfather. His second wife is none other than Maya's younger sister, Radha (Devika), who Maya thought was dead. When Maya's father (Gajanan Jagirdar) had approached Harish to marry his daughter, Harish had assumed it was Radha, as the two were in love with each other. When Radha finds out that Maya too loves Harish, she forces him to marry Maya. Harish and Maya then leave their hometown Meerut, where Harish was helping his father-in-law in his car mechanic business, to go for a job to Rangoon at the invitation of Harish's brother-in-law, his sister's husband. One day, his brother-in-law brings home tickets to see a stage performance. Maya, Jaggu and his mother went for it. The time period is WW II, and during a bomb raid, it is assumed that all three of them are killed. Harish gets back to India after he fails to find them. Radha's father who is already heartbroken due to Maya's death, asks Harish to marry Radha, but complications arise when news by telegram reaches them that Maya is alive in Rangoon. Her father then suffers a heart attack, but makes Harish promise that he'll not let Radha know that Maya is alive, nor tell Maya that he's married to Radha, as he feels that each may sacrifice their life for the other. After Harish ends up telling the truth, Gopal too admits to having spent nights with his wife, Kamla, without his parents' knowledge. All ends well with the last scene; the families, in laws, brides and grooms are in the wedding processions.

== Cast ==
- Ashok Kumar as Harishchandra "Harish" Khanna
- Nirupa Roy as Maya Khanna
- Manoj Kumar as Mohan
- Rajshree as Kiran Khanna
- Mehmood as Jaggu
- Lalita Pawar as Harish's sister
- Indrani Mukherjee as Kamini Khanna
- Devika as Radha
- Sudesh Kumar as Ravindra
- Shobha Khote as Rekha
- Achla Sachdev as Gopal's Mother
- Bharati Malvankar as Kamla
- Bipin Gupta as Mohan's Father
- Pushpavalli as Mohan's Mother
- Iftekhar as Harish's Brother-in-law
- Kanhaiyalal as Ram Swaroop
- Manmohan Krishna as Doctor
- Jagirdar as Radha and Maya's Father

== Reception and box office ==
The film premiere was held at the Naaz Theatre in Bombay on 28 February 1963. The songs and story were appreciated by the critics. With the crowds "storming" the theatre, MotherIndia magazine commented that "Grahasti has pleased the masses". The film was a big box office success, with journalist Randor Guy describing it in The Hindu as a "box-office bonanza". The Thought journal called it a "Daringly different domestic drama".

== Awards ==
The film's music composer Ravi won an award for the song "Jeevan Jyot Jale". It was adjudged the Best Classical Composition in the "Sur-Singar Film Awards" for 1963. He won the "Swami Haridas Award", while Asha Bhosle won the "Mian Tansen Award" as a singer.

== Story inspiration and remake ==
The film was adapted from a true story as recorded by Randor Guy in The Hindu and based on Liam O'Brien's hit play, which in turn was made into a film of the same name, The Remarkable Mr. Pennypacker (1959) with Clifton Webb. Producer S. S. Vasan first presented the story idea to Sivaji Ganesan, who turned it down. It was then made in Hindi with Ashok Kumar playing the main character. The success of the film changed Ganesan's mind and it was produced in Tamil as Motor Sundaram Pillai (1966), with Ganesan playing the role enacted by Ashok Kumar. Sowcar Janaki and Manimala played the two wives. The film was also remade in Telugu as Manchi Kutumbam and in Malayalam as Samudram with Prem Nazir and Sheela in the lead roles.

== Soundtrack ==
Asha Bhosle's rendition of the song "Jeevan Jyot Jale" won her the "Mian Tansen Award". The song was cited as the best song of 1963 out of the 544 songs released that year from a total of 77 films. The other popular number from the film was Geeta Dutt's "Ding Dong Ding Dong Ding Lala". The music composer was Ravi and the lyrics were by Shakeel Badayuni. The playback singers were Lata Mangeshkar, Mohammed Rafi, Asha Bhosle, Geeta Dutt and Usha Mangeshkar.

=== Song list ===
Song	Singer
"Zara Dekh Sanam"	Lata Mangeshkar
"Jane Teri Nazaron Ne Kya Kar Diya"	Lata Mangeshkar, Mohammed Rafi
"Aaj Mili Ek Ladki"	Mohammed Rafi
"Agar Sansar Mein Aurat"	Mohammed Rafi
"Payal Khul Khul Jaye Ram Mori"	Mohammed Rafi, Asha Bhosle
"Ja Ja Re Ja Deewane Ja, Ja Ja Re Ja Deewani Ja"	Mohammed Rafi, Asha Bhosle
"Jeevan Jyot Jale"	Asha Bhosle
"Khile Hai Sakhi Aaj Phoolwa Man ke, Jaungi Sasural Dulhan Banke"	Lata Mangeshkar, Asha Bhosle, Usha Mangeshkar
"Ding Dong Ding Lalla"	Geeta Dutt
