= Hridayi Vasant Phulatana =

1988 Indian Marathi-language song

- Official song cover

Song by Suresh Wadkar, Anuradha Paudwal, Sudesh Bhosale, Shailendra Singh, Sachin Pilgaonkar, Aparna Mayekar

from the album Ashi Hi Banwa Banwi
- Language: Marathi
- Released: 1988
- Genre: Filmi
- Length: 7:06
- Label: Ishtar Music
- Songwriter: Shantaram Nandgaonkar
- Composer: Arun Paudwal

Ashi Hi Banwa Banwi track listing
- 1. "Ashi Hi Banwa Banwi"; 2. "Manuja Jaag Jara"; 3. "Shirshak Geet"; 4. "Hridayi Vasant Phulatana"; 5. "Kunitari Yenar"

Music video
- Hridayi Vasant Phulatana on YouTube

"Hridayi Vasant Phulatana" (transl. When the spring blooms in the heart) is an Indian Marathi-language song from the soundtrack of the 1988 film Ashi Hi Banwa Banwi. It was composed by Arun Paudwal, with lyrics penned by Shantaram Nandgaonkar and vocals provided by Suresh Wadkar, Anuradha Paudwal, Sudesh Bhosale, Shailendra Singh, Sachin Pilgaonkar, and Aparna Mayekar. The video song features Ashok Saraf, Ashwini Bhave, Laxmikant Berde, Priya Berde, Sachin Pilgaonkar, Supriya Pilgaonkar, Siddharth Ray, Nivedita Joshi Saraf.

== Picturisation ==
The dance depicted in the song was filmed across various locations. Actor Siddharth Ray is taller than Nivedita Joshi Saraf, which required her to look up and him to look down throughout the entire dance. Choreographer Sachin Pilgaonkar mentioned that showcasing the love relationships of the other three couples in the story posed no issues in choreography, but he noted the challenges faced while staging the dance for Ray and Joshi Saraf. The portion of song involving Laxmikant Berde and Priya Arun Berde was rehearsed in Mumbai and filmed in Pune.

The song was picturised on the four pairs of Ashok Saraf–Ashwini Bhave, Laxmikant Berde–Priya Arun Berde, Sachin Pilgaonkar–Supriya Pilgaonkar, Siddharth Ray–Nivedita Joshi Saraf.

== Credits ==
- Album – Ashi Hi Banwa Banwi
- Singers – Suresh Wadkar, Anuradha Paudwal, Sudesh Bhosale, Shailendra Singh, Sachin Pilgaonkar, Aparna Mayekar
- Lyricist – Shantaram Nandgaonkar
- Music – Arun Paudwal

== Reception ==
Ganesh Ghanekar of Maharashtra Times wrote "The compilation of this song is so amazing that every pair has got proper scope." He gave credit to Sachin's experience and hard work in Hindi and Marathi films.

== Adaptations ==
=== Takatak 2 (2022) ===
The song was remade as an item number with the same title for the 2022 film Takatak 2, with lyricist Jai Atre providing new lyrics, Shruti Rane lending her vocals, and Varun Saket handling composition. Choreographer Rahul Sanjeer oversaw the dance sequences. The song featured Iranian-German model Elnaaz Norouzi alongside Prathamesh Parab, Pranali Bhalerao, Komal Bodkhe, Ajinkya Raut, and Akshay Kelkar. It was officially released on YouTube by Ishtar Music.

== In popular culture ==
- In 2019, the Marathi TV series Chhatriwali featured a recreation of the song, during which actors Namrata Pradhan and Sanket Pathak were seen portraying Sachin and Supriya Pilgaonkar's iconic characters with their attire.
