= Man Tera Tan Mera =

- Directed by: B. R. Ishara
- Starring: Anil Dhawan; Rehana Sultan; Shatrughan Sinha
- Music by: Sapan-Jagmohan
- Release date: 1971
- Country: India
- Language: Hindi

Man Tera Tan Mera is a 1971 Bollywood drama film directed by B. R. Ishara. The film stars Anil Dhawan, Rehana Sultan, and Shatrughan Sinha.

== Cast ==
- Anil Dhawan as Deepak
- Rehana Sultan as Jyoti
- Shatrughan Sinha as Rajan
- Nayantara

== Music ==
All songs were written by Naqsh Lyallpuri.

Song	Singer
"Zindagi Ke Mod Par"	Mukesh
"Main Bhi Hoon, Tu Bhi Hai"	Asha Bhosle
"Na Main Boli, Na Woh Bole"	Asha Bhosle
"Kahin Kaanton Mein Mehak Hai"	Asha Bhosle
