= Wheel of Fortune India =

- Genre: Game show
- Based on: Wheel of Fortune by Merv Griffin
- Directed by: Vinod Thazava
- Presented by: Akshay Kumar
- Composers: Merv Griffin (Original theme composer); John Hoke (Bleeding Fingers Music)
- Country of origin: India
- Original language: Hindi
- No. of seasons: 1
- No. of episodes: 65

Production
- Producers: Hemant Ruprell; Ranjeet Thakur
- Production company: Frames Production

Original release
- Network: Sony Entertainment Television
- Release: 27 January – 27 April 2026

Wheel of Fortune India is an Indian Hindi-language television game show based on the American television format Wheel of Fortune. The series is produced by Frames Production Company and is being broadcast on Sony Entertainment Television. Actor Akshay Kumar serves as the host of the programme.

The programme marks the entry of the Wheel of Fortune franchise into Indian television and adapts the original format for Indian audiences.

== Format ==
Wheel of Fortune India follows the core format of the international franchise, using the UK version's rule set. Contestants spin a large wheel to determine cash values and attempt to solve word puzzles by guessing letters. Correct guesses allow contestants to accumulate winnings, while incorrect spins may result in penalties such as loss of turn or loss of accumulated amounts.

The Indian adaptation features Hindi-language puzzles and culturally relevant categories while retaining the structure of the original format.

== Production ==
Sony Pictures Networks India acquired the Indian adaptation rights to Wheel of Fortune from the format owners and commissioned Frames Production Company to produce the series.

Akshay Kumar was announced as the host ahead of the programme's premiere.His co-host is named Elnaaz Norouzi.

== Release ==
Official poster.

Wheel of Fortune India is scheduled to premiere on 27 January 2026 on Sony Entertainment Television. Episodes will also be made available on SonyLIV, the network's digital streaming platform. Due to its short-lived run, on 13 April 2026, it was announcedthat another gameshow Tum Ho Naa (You're Here, Aren't You?) hosted by Rajeev Khandelwal will replace it. It premieres on 28 April 2026. As per the reports the 2nd Season Of Wheel Of Fortune Of India will Possibly be Coming in Jan 2027 (as teased on finale episode) and it will be hosted by Shah Rukh Khan. So stay tuned.

== Episodes ==
| No. | Season | Title | Original air date |
|---|---|---|---|
| 1 | 1 | Spin the Wheel with Riteish, Genelia and Shreyas | January 27, 2026 |
| 2 | 1 | Spin the Wheel with Kanisha, Krunal and Shipra | January 28, 2026 |
| 3 | 1 | Spin the Wheel with Eesha, Harshmaan and Vaishnavi | January 29, 2026 |
| 4 | 1 | Spin the Wheel with Shakti, Chunky and Gulshan | January 30, 2026 |
| 5 | 1 | Spin the Wheel with Sandipa, Naresh and Alpana | February 2, 2026 |
| 6 | 1 | Spin the Wheel with Mumal, Ranjeet and Srishti | February 3, 2026 |
| 7 | 1 | Spin the Wheel with Riteish, Tusshar and Sajid | February 4, 2026 |
| 8 | 1 | Spin the Wheel with Nitish, Vaishnavi and Anil | February 5, 2026 |
| 9 | 1 | Spin the Wheel with Karisma, Anu and Mouni | February 6, 2026 |
| 10 | 1 | Spin the Wheel with Srishti, Karanjeet and Banti | February 9, 2026 |
| 11 | 1 | Spin the Wheel with Saba, Prashant and Rajeshwari | February 10, 2026 |
| 12 | 1 | Spin the Wheel with Puja, Manya and Fouzia | February 11, 2026 |
| 13 | 1 | Spin the Wheel with Neelam, Maheep and Bhavana | February 12, 2026 |
| 14 | 1 | Spin the Wheel with Siddhant, Mrunal and Ravi | February 13, 2026 |
| 15 | 1 | Spin the Wheel with Anupam, Namita and Aman | February 16, 2026 |
| 16 | 1 | Spin the Wheel with Akansha, Akriti and Astha | February 17, 2026 |
| 17 | 1 | Spin the Wheel with Sougata, Swati and Yash | February 18, 2026 |
| 18 | 1 | Spin the Wheel with Mithila, Danish and RJ | February 19, 2026 |
| 19 | 1 | Spin the Wheel with Sahil, Ira and Leon | February 20, 2026 |
| 20 | 1 | Spin the Wheel with Adarsh, Anit and Mohit | February 23, 2026 |
| 21 | 1 | Spin the Wheel with Manav, Ashu and Nisha | February 24, 2026 |
| 22 | 1 | Spin the Wheel with Sandeep, Sayali and Amol | February 25, 2026 |
| 23 | 1 | Spin the Wheel with Shivani, Mitesh and Sayanti | February 26, 2026 |
| 24 | 1 | Spin the Wheel with Aakash, Priyanshi and Prateek | February 27, 2026 |
| 25 | 1 | Spin the Wheel with Sharthak, Nikita and Dennis | March 2, 2026 |
| 26 | 1 | Spin the Wheel with Anil, Saurabh and Radhika | March 3, 2026 |
| 27 | 1 | Spin the Wheel with Kuldeep, Atul and Ravinder | March 4, 2026 |
| 28 | 1 | Spin the Wheel with Namita, Raunak and Phalguni | March 5, 2026 |
| 29 | 1 | Spin the Wheel with Shibani, Abhineet and Garima | March 6, 2026 |
| 30 | 1 | Spin the Wheel with Sonal, Sudhir and Navika | March 9, 2026 |
| 31 | 1 | Spin the Wheel with Viraj, Pranjali and Yashraj | March 10, 2026 |
| 32 | 1 | Spin the Wheel with Sunackshi, Shaan and Nishrin | March 11, 2026 |
| 33 | 1 | Spin the Wheel with Rakesh, Gaurav and Ayesha | March 12, 2026 |
| 34 | 1 | Spin the Wheel with Maniesh, Karan and Iqbal | March 13, 2026 |
| 35 | 1 | Spin the Wheel with Shruhad, Karan and Reeva | March 16, 2026 |
| 36 | 1 | Spin the Wheel with Meetu, Akash and Khyati | March 17, 2026 |
| 37 | 1 | Spin the Wheel with Ishanjali, Arjun and Kiara | March 18, 2026 |
| 38 | 1 | Spin the Wheel with Rohan, Aashima and Harshit | March 19, 2026 |
| 39 | 1 | Spin the Wheel with Harsh, Sugandha and Kiku | March 20, 2026 |
| 40 | 1 | Spin the Wheel with Rashmi, Damini and Neeta | March 23, 2026 |
| 41 | 1 | Spin the Wheel with Lekha, Madhav and Hitavachana | March 24, 2026 |
| 42 | 1 | Spin the Wheel with Daksh, Stuti and Mickey | March 25, 2026 |
| 43 | 1 | Spin the Wheel with Surbhi, Rohit and Mahek | March 26, 2026 |
| 44 | 1 | Spin the Wheel with Ektaa, Rajpal and Wamiqa | March 27, 2026 |
| 45 | 1 | Spin the Wheel with Sonali, Prasang and Indulekha | March 30, 2026 |
| 46 | 1 | Spin the Wheel with Yashoda, Abhishek and Shreya | March 31, 2026 |
| 47 | 1 | Spin the Wheel with Ankita, Manoj and Dalima | April 1, 2026 |
| 48 | 1 | Spin the Wheel with Tejas, Vanita and Rahul | April 2, 2026 |
| 49 | 1 | Spin the Wheel with Vispy, Pranya and Avesh | April 3, 2026 |
| 50 | 1 | Spin The Wheel with Apoorv, Priya And Naveen | April 6, 2026 |
| 51 | 1 | Spin The Wheel with Neetu, Andell And Archana | April 7, 2026 |
| 52 | 1 | Spin The Wheel with Devangana, Sahil And Hemal | April 8, 2026 |
| 53 | 1 | Spin The Wheel with Megha, Mahendra And Jayshree | April 9, 2026 |
| 54 | 1 | Spin The Wheel with Rajkummar, Sanya And Archana | April 10, 2026 |
| 55 | 1 | Spin The Wheel with Aryan, Ankit And Rohan | April 13, 2026 |
| 56 | 1 | Spin The Wheel with Sadeev, Karandeep And Gurpreet | April 14, 2026 |
| 57 | 1 | Spin The Wheel with Vidhi, Riwaj And Nilam | April 15, 2026 |
| 58 | 1 | Spin The Wheel with Nikhil, Purva And Akshay | April 16, 2026 |
| 59 | 1 | Spin The Wheel with Akansha, Vivek And Chanda | April 17, 2026 |
| 60 | 1 | Spin the Wheel with Swetta, Jai and Munisha | April 20, 2026 |
| 61 | 1 | Spin The Wheel With Astha, Robin and Sangeeta | April 21, 2026 |
| 62 | 1 | Spin The Wheel With Niyati, Snehan and Nisheta | April 22, 2026 |
| 63 | 1 | Spin The Wheel With Sarita, Jaikumar and Tanvi | April 23, 2026 |
| 64 | 1 | Spin The Wheel With Ankita, Pooja and Divya | April 24, 2026 |
| 65 | 1 | Spin The Wheel With Jacqueline, Farah and Bhumi | April 27, 2026 |

== See also ==
- Wheel of Fortune (American game show)
- International versions of Wheel of Fortune
