= Sanjog (1972 film) =

1972 film by S. S. Balan

- Poster
- Directed by: S. S. Balan
- Produced by: Ayaz Ali Shaikh
- Starring: Mala Sinha; Amitabh Bachchan; Aruna Irani
- Music by: R. D. Burman
- Production company: Gemini Studios
- Release date: 25 February 1972
- Country: India
- Language: Hindi

Sanjog (transl. Destiny) is a 1972 Indian Hindi-language drama film directed by S. S. Balan. The film stars Mala Sinha, Amitabh Bachchan and Aruna Irani in the lead roles. It is a remake of the Tamil film Iru Kodugal directed by K. Balachander.

== Plot ==
Mohan (Amitabh Bachchan) falls in love with Asha (Mala Sinha) and they get married in temple. The marriage is not accepted by Mohan's mother and the couple gets separated. Asha is pregnant and her father Shiv Dayal (Madan Puri), realising that no man will marry Asha second time, decides to make her a collector. Mohan meanwhile had moved to South India, where he later married Seema (Aruna Irani) as he was informed through his parents that Asha died. They live a happy life with their two children and Seema's father (Nazir Hussain). Mohan works as a clerk in the collector's office. A new collector arrives at the office, and it turns out to be Asha. They tend to work together and Mansukh (Johnny Walker) with his friends spread a rumour across stating that there is an affair between Asha and Mohan. This rumour reaches Seema and she is completely disturbed. Seema discovers the secret of Mohan's affair with Asha. After much turmoil, Seema finds out that Asha and Mohan had married 10 year back before her marriage to Mohan. In this, while saving Seema when she wanted to die, Asha dies. Asha gives her eyes to Seema, whose eye-sight went in the accident in which Asha died. The ending scenes show Mohan, Seema, her father, Asha's father, and three kids (two Seema's and one Asha's) altogether paying homage to Asha.

== Cast ==
- Mala Sinha as Asha
- Amitabh Bachchan as Mohan
- Aruna Irani as Seema
- Madan Puri as Shiv Dayal
- Nazir Hussain as Seema's Father
- Johnny Walker as Mansukh
- Keshto Mukherjee as Mohan's father
- Ramesh Deo as Hospital Doctor
- Malika as Mala

== Soundtrack ==
Song	Singer
"Roop Yeh Tera Jisne Banaya"	Kishore Kumar
"Ek Do Teen Char"	Kishore Kumar
"Kisi Gul Ki Yeh Kismat Hai"	Mohammed Rafi
"Man Mandir Mein Preet Ka Dera Na Hi Koi Duja"	Lata Mangeshkar, Asha Bhosle

== Reception ==
Film World wrote, "Had Balan stuck to the original Tamil version [Iru Kodugal] instead of padding the proceedings with the stuff that is supposed to spell box office in Hindi Cinema, Sanjog would have been a passable entertainer. Mukhram Sharma's screenplay is old-fashioned, trite and incoherent. The direction is missing."
