= Subah Ka Tara =

- Directed by: V. Shantaram
- Written by: Shams Lakhnavi
- Story by: Shams Lakhnavi
- Produced by: V. Shantaram
- Starring: Pradeep Kumar; Jayshree; Rajshree; Amirbai Karnataki
- Cinematography: G. Balakrishna
- Edited by: Chintamani Borkar
- Music by: C. Ramchandra
- Production company: Rajkamal Kalamandir
- Distributed by: Rajkamal Kalamandir
- Release date: 1954
- Running time: 136 minutes
- Country: India
- Language: Hindi

Subah Ka Tara (The Morning Star) is a 1954 Hindi social romantic film directed by V. Shantaram. The film was produced by Rajkamal Kalamandir and had story and dialogues by Shams Lucknavi. The director of photography was G. Balkrishna. It had music composed by C. Ramchandra and the lyricists were Noor Lakhnavi and Diwan Sharar. The title song "Chamka Chamka Subah Ka Tara" was one of the notable songs from this film. Rajshree appeared in her debut role as a child star. The cast included Pradeep Kumar, Jayshree, Amirbai Karnataki, Rajshree, Shakuntala Paranjpye and Naaz.

Jayshree plays the role of a young widow pursued by a young man (Pradeep Kumar) who falls in love with her, but is unable to marry her due to societal norms and subsequently becomes insane.

== Plot ==
The film, told in flash-back, starts with a few people troubling a disheveled, insane man holding a bedding. The mad man is Mohan who finally sits down with a sympathiser and starts narrating the story. Mohan meets a young widow, Padmini taking medicine for her dying mother. Padmini's mother, from her death-bed, warns her about befriending young men as she's a widow and society demands that she live alone with just a white sheet as a companion, for that's her life as a widow. Following her mother's death, Padmini goes to her paternal uncle's house to live. Her uncle has gone to Africa and her Aunt treats her badly. Mohan falls ill thinking about Padmini's situation and her rebuff when he pursues her. He is looked after by his mother and young sister. Padmini is made to work as a maid in her Uncle's house but has a kind cousin sister, Bharti. Mohan arrives there on some work and the Aunt has chosen him as a suitable boy for Bharti's marriage. Mohan sees Padmini and tells her how he feels, which is overheard by the Aunt. The Aunt throws Padmini out of the house to fend for herself. The story continues with the problems Padmini faces, Mohan's search for Padmini and her death when she sets the house left by her mother, on fire. Mohan finds the bedding in the aftermath of the fire and goes insane.

== Cast ==
- V. Shantaram as the drunken man
- Jayashree as Padmini
- Pradeep Kumar as Mohan
- Neelambai as Mohan's mother
- Baby Rajshree as Sogi, Mohan's sister
- Shakuntala Paranjpye as Chachi
- Naaz as Heera
- Amirbai Karnataki as neighbour
- Nimbalkar as Paanwala
- Chandrakanta as Bharti
- Jogendra as Milkman
- Aminabai as Padmini's mother

== Crew ==
- Producer Rajkamal Kalamandir
- Director: V. Shantaram
- Story: Shams Lucknavi
- Dialogue: Shams Lucknavi
- Music: C. Ramchandra
- Lyrics: Noor Lucknavi, Diwan Sharar
- Cinematographer: G. Balkrishna
- Editor: Chintamani Borkar
- Art Director: Baburao Jadhav
- Sound: A. K. Parmar
- Make-up: Baba Vardam
- Still Photography: Kirtiwan

== Review ==
Shantaram played a small part as a drunk man, whose house Jayshree goes to looking for a job. His role was appreciated as the "engaging drunk" in the film. Jayshree's role as Padmini, the young widow, was commended but her "speaking in whispers" was censured. Pradeep Kumar's role as the "socially conscious" youth was termed "memorable".

== Soundtrack ==
Shantaram chose C. Ramchandra as opposed to Vasant Desai for some of his films, Parchhain, Navrang and Subah Ka Tara. However, Desai scored the background music for both the films. The film's title song "Gaya Andhera Hua Ujala Chamka Subah Ka Tara" in Raga Pahadi was sung by Talat Mahmood and Lata Mangeshkar. The other notable songs from the film were Talat's "Apni Nakami Se Mujhko Kaam Hai", and "Badi Dhoom Dham Se Meri Bhabhi Aayi" sung by Usha Mangeshkar, which was also her debut song.

The music director was C. Ramchandra with lyrics by Noor Lucknawi and the song "Do Haklon Ka Suno Fasana" written by Diwan Sharar. The singers were Lata Mangeshkar, Talat Mahmood, C. Ramchandra and Usha Mangeshkar.

=== Song list ===
| Song | Singer |
|---|---|
| "Kismat Ne Humko" | Lata Mangeshkar |
| "Kahoon Kaise Main" | Lata Mangeshkar |
| "Chali Banke Dulhan" | Lata Mangeshkar |
| "Do Haklon Ka Suno Fasana" | Lata Mangeshkar |
| "Gaya Andhera Hua Ujara, Chamka Subah Ka Tara" | Lata Mangeshkar, Talat Mahmood |
| "Apni Nakaami Se Mujhko" | Talat Mahmood |
| "Zara O Janewale" | C. Ramchandra |
| "Bhabhi Aayi" | Usha Mangeshkar |
