= S. S. Balan =

Indian journalist, filmmaker, and analyst (1935–2014)

S. Balasubramanian
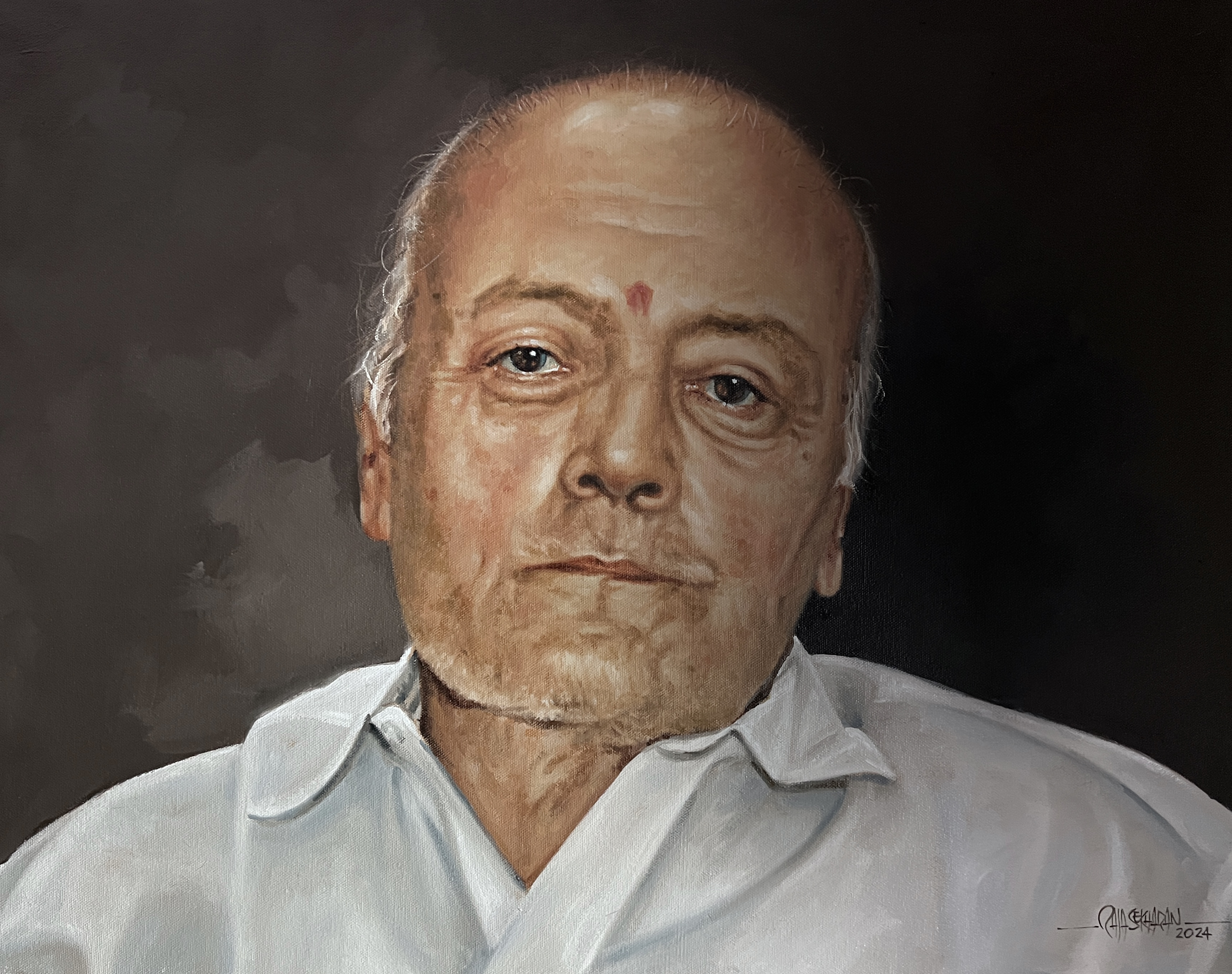
- Oil painting of S. S. Balan.
- Born: S. Balasubramanian; 28 December 1935; Madras, Madras Presidency, British India (now Chennai, Tamil Nadu, India)
- Died: 19 December 2014 (aged 78); Chennai, Tamil Nadu, India
- Occupations: Journalist, filmmaker & political analyst

S. Balasubramanian (28 December 1935 – 19 December 2014) better known as S. S. Balan, was an Indian journalist, filmmaker, political analyst, and media executive.

Balan had a six-decade-long career in Indian media as the editor of the Tamil-language magazine, Ananda Vikatan, based in Chennai, India, and as managing director of Gemini Studios, starting in the 1950s. He later served as chairman of the Vikatan Group.

== Early life and education ==
Balan was born on 28 December 1935 in Madras (now Chennai) to S. S. Vasan and Pattammal Vasan (d. 1996). He studied at Presentation Convent, Church Park, and P. S. High School. Afterwards, he later went on to earn a B.Com. degree from Loyola College, Madras.

== Family ==
S. S. Balan was married to Saroja Balasubramniam. and they had seven children, six daughters and one son.. His son B. Srinivasan is now Managing Director for the Vikatan group.

== Magazine career ==
Ananda Vikatan, the flagship weekly magazine of Vikatan Publications, was founded in 1926 and acquired by Balan's father, S. S. Vasan in 1928. Balan joined Ananda Vikatan as Joint managing director and chief editor on 26 August 1956 at 21..He became managing director on 26 August 1969, following the death of his father, Vasan. He served as a chairman to Vikatan group until his death.

In 1987, Balan was involved in controversy when the Tamil Nadu Legislative Assembly lodged him in prison for three days over a cartoon satire published on the cover of Ananda Vikatan. Following public backlash, he was released and in 1994, he appealed to court against his unlawful arrest and the Madras High Court ruled in his favor, awarding him ₹1,000 in compensation. Balan reportedly framed and displayed the achievement in his office.

Balan also introduced a program for student journalists, contributing to the development of many Tamil media professionals.

== Filmography ==
Year	Films	Director	Writer	Producer	Language	Notes
1961	Gharana	No	Yes	No	Hindi	
1963	Grahasti	No	Yes	No	Hindi	
1966	Motor Sundaram Pillai	Yes	No	No	Tamil	
1967	Aurat	Yes	No	Yes	Hindi	
1968	Teen Bahuraniyan	Yes	No	Yes	Hindi	
1968	Oli Vilakku	Yes	Yes	No	Tamil	
1969	Shatranj	No	Yes	Yes	Hindi	
1971	Lakhon Mein Ek	Yes	No	Yes	Hindi	
1972	Sanjog	Yes	No	No	Hindi	
1974	Siriththu Vaazha Vendum	Yes	No	No	Tamil	
1974	Kannavaari Kalalu	Yes	Yes	No	Telugu	
1975	Ellorum Nallavare	Yes	No	Yes	Tamil	Also released in Hindi as Ek Gaon Ki Kahani
1976	Maa Daivam	Yes	Yes	No	Telugu	
1978	Nishan	Yes	Yes	Yes	Bengali	

== Death ==
Balan died of a heart attack on 19 December 2014 in a private hospital in Chennai, nine days before his 79th birthday. His family donated his body to the Sri Ramachandra Medical College as per his wishes.
