= Kiran Shantaram =

Indian film personality and Sheriff of Mumbai (born 1942)

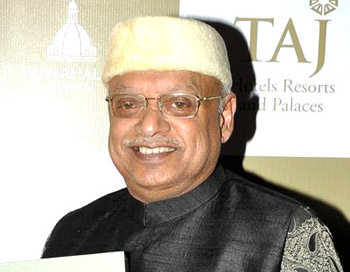
- Born: 1942 (age 83–84)
- Parents: V. Shantaram (father); Jayshree (mother)
- Relatives: Rajshree (sister) Sandhya Shantaram (step-mother)

Kiran V. Shantaram (born 1942) is an Indian film personality and former Sheriff of Mumbai.

== Professional life ==
Shantaram made his debut in the industry by working as assistant director of the film Navrang; he was responsible for continuity shots and shot a fantasy song. He made his directorial debut with Zunj (1975) and went on to produce movies like Ashi Hi Banwa Banwi (1988) and Balache Baap Brahmachari (1989). He is chairman of V. Shantaram foundation and head of Asian Film Foundation. He is also the chairman of Prabhat Chitra Mandal. He is the trustee of V. Shantaram trust that owns Plaza cinema, Mumbai and is also its general manager. He is the president of The Mercedes Benz Club of India. He is the chairman of Federation of Film Societies of India. He was a jury for the Feature films section of the 43rd National Film Festival, 1996.

== Personal life ==
He is the son of V. Shantaram and Jayashree. He also has two sisters, Tejashree and actress Rajshree. In 1966, he married Jyoti Shantaram. The couple has two sons. Four granddaughters are also associated with the Indian film and content industry.

He and Jyoti reside in their 90-year-old ancestral family home on Peddar Road, Mumbai, where they live alongside their elder son Rahul and his family.
