= Here Comes the Groom (1951 film) =

1951 film by Frank Capra

- Theatrical release poster
- Directed by: Frank Capra
- Screenplay by: Virginia Van Upp; Liam O'Brien; Myles Connolly
- Story by: Robert Riskin; Liam O'Brien
- Produced by: Frank Capra
- Starring: Bing Crosby; Jane Wyman; Alexis Smith; Anna Maria Alberghetti
- Cinematography: George Barnes
- Edited by: Ellsworth Hoagland
- Music by: Joseph J. Lilley (uncredited)
- Production company: Paramount Pictures
- Distributed by: Paramount Pictures
- Release date: September 20, 1951 (New York)
- Running time: 113 minutes
- Country: United States
- Language: English
- Box office: $2,550,000 (U.S.)

Here Comes the Groom is a 1951 American musical romantic comedy film produced and directed by Frank Capra and starring Bing Crosby and Jane Wyman. Based on a story by Robert Riskin and Liam O'Brien, the plot concerns a foreign correspondent who tries to regain the love of his former fiancée and avoid losing his adopted orphans.

== Plot ==
Newspaper reporter Pete Garvey works in a Paris orphanage. His charming way with children and music enables him to find homes for even the most troubled kids. American couple Mr. and Mrs. Godfrey come to the orphanage to adopt Bobby, a boy whom they had seen in an advertisement that Pete had published in his newspaper. Bobby misbehaves, but when Pete discovers that Mr. Godfrey plays for the Boston Symphony Orchestra, he instead produces young blind opera wunderkind Theresa.

Later that night, Pete listens to a record sent by Emmadel, the fiancée whom he had left behind in the U.S. She scolds him for leaving her at the altar and talking about the children that they might have had. Filled with regret, Pete arranges to adopt Bobby and his little sister Suzi and bring them to Boston, where he plans to marry Emmadel. American authorities inform him that he must marry within five days or the adoptions will be voided.

After delays in obtaining the children's birth certificates, they and Pete fly to Boston and visit Emmadel. Pete discovers that she had lost hope that he would return and is now engaged to the aristocratic Wilbur Stanley. The children stay with her loud parents, drunken fisherman William and disapproving mother Mia. Emmadel helps Pete secure a lease on a new house through her fiancé's company. However, another couple claims to have a lease for the property. Wilbur settles the matter and Pete persuades him to allow them to stay in the Stanley family's gatehouse. They agree to a friendly competition for Emmadel's heart during the days preceding the wedding.

Pete and the children settle into the lavish gatehouse where Emmadel's parents are also staying. Emmadel visits the gatehouse to confront him. Pete pretends to be in love with Wilbur's distant cousin Winnifred. He discovers that Winnifred has long been in love with her cousin Wilbur, but she is too shy to pursue him. Pete instills confidence in Winnifred, causing her to brawl with Emmadel.

The wedding day arrives is a media sensation. As he escorts Emmadel down the aisle, her father tells her that Pete had kidnapped the children and fled so that they would not be returned to France, causing her to develop second thoughts about the wedding. Pete arrives, handcuffed to an FBI agent, with both children crying. Although Wilbur offers to marry Emmadel and adopt the children, Bobby and Suzi cling to Pete. On national television, Wilbur abandons his wedding and forces Emmadel and Pete to marry.

== Cast ==
- Bing Crosby as Pete Garvey
- Jane Wyman as Emmadel Jones
- James Barton as William Jones
- Connie Gilchrist as Ma Jones
- Walter Catlett and Ellen Corby as the McGonigles
- Robert Keith as George Degnan
- Alan Reed as Walter Godfrey
- Minna Gombell as Mrs. Godfrey
- Franchot Tone as Wilbur Stanley
- Alexis Smith as Winifred Stanley
- H. B. Warner as Uncle Elihu
- Ian Wolfe as Uncle Adam
- Nicholas Joy as Uncle Prentiss
- Maidel Turner as Aunt Abby
- Adeline De Walt Reynolds as Aunt Amy
- Jacques Gencel as Bobby
- Beverly Washburn as Suzi
- Anna Maria Alberghetti as Theresa
- Louis Armstrong as Himself
- Cass Daley as Herself
- Phil Harris as Himself
- Dorothy Lamour as Herself
- Frank Hagney as Passenger on Airplane (uncredited)
- J. Farrell MacDonald as Husband on Airplane (uncredited)
- Charles Lane as FBI Agent Ralph Burchard (uncredited)
- James Finlayson as Drunken Sailor/Wedding Guest (uncredited)

== Reception ==
Bing Crosby arranged for the world premiere of the film to be held in Elko, Nevada on July 30, 1951, and the charitable events associated with it raised $10,000 for the Hospital Building Fund. The New York premiere took place at the Astor Theatre on September 20, 1951.

In a contemporary review for The New York Times, critic Bosley Crowther wrote:

Again the calculated coincidence of Frank Capra and Bing Crosby combined to produce and direct a picture and star in it, respectively, has resulted in a light, breezy item, nicely marked with the genial Capra touch and adorned with the cheerful disposition and the casual vocalizing of Bing. There isn't a great deal of substance to the gentlemen's "Here Comes the Groom," ... As a matter of fact, a fair-sized zephyr or a few harsh words might blow it away, and it barely survives the burlesque antics that occur in it from time to time. But the idea of it is amusing and the writing is clever and glib. Mr. Capra and Mr. Crosby have both worked harder and done worse.

Variety reviewer William Brogdon wrote:

Paramount has a topnotch piece of comedy diversion in Here Comes the Groom. It is the sock picture both Bing Crosby and Frank Capra have needed and tops all of their more recent entries. The box-office response should be as hearty as its laughs, particularly after strong word-of-mouth potential gets going ... Crosby is at his casual best, nonchalantly tossing his quips for the most effect. Miss Wyman is a wow as the girlfriend who makes him really work to win her. The two join on the Hit Parade tune, "In the Cool, Cool, Cool of the Evening," by Johnny Mercer and Hoagy Carmichael, in a socko song-and-dance session.

== Soundtrack ==
- "Caro nome": sung by Anna Maria Alberghetti
- "Your Own Little House" (Jay Livingston / Ray Evans): sung by Bing Crosby
- "In the Cool, Cool, Cool of the Evening": sung by Bing Crosby and Jane Wyman
- "Misto Cristofo Columbo" (Jay Livingston / Ray Evans): sung by Bing Crosby, Louis Armstrong, Cass Daley, Dorothy Lamour and Phil Harris
- "Oh Promise Me": sung by Bing Crosby
- "Bonne Nuit (Goodnight)" (Jay Livingston / Ray Evans): sung by Bing Crosby

Bing Crosby recorded four of the songs for Decca Records. "In the Cool, Cool, Cool of the Evening" reached the Billboard chart for six weeks, with a peak position of #11. Crosby's songs were also included in the Bing's Hollywood series.

== Awards ==
Award	Category	Nominee(s)	Result	Ref.
Academy Awards	Best Story	Robert Riskin and Liam O'Brien	Nominated	
Academy Awards	Best Song	"In the Cool, Cool, Cool of the Evening"; Music by Hoagy Carmichael; Lyrics by Johnny Mercer	Won	
Golden Globe Awards	Best Actor in a Motion Picture – Musical or Comedy	Bing Crosby	Nominated	
Writers Guild of America Awards	Best Written American Musical	Virginia Van Upp, Liam O'Brien and Myles Connolly	Nominated	

"In the Cool, Cool, Cool of the Evening" was nominated by American Film Institute for inclusion in its 2004 list AFI's 100 Years ... 100 Songs.
