= Khido Khundi =

- Directed by: Rohit Jugraj
- Written by: Daljit Kaur; Surmeet Maavi
- Produced by: Upinderjit Grewal; Kavanjit Hayre; Talwinder Hayre
- Starring: Ranjit Bawa; Manav Vij; Mandy Takhar; Guggu Gill
- Music by: Jaidev Kumar
- Production companies: Cinemadic Motion Pictures UK Ltd; Kuausmedia Entertainment; Hayre Entertainment
- Release date: 20 April 2018
- Running time: 152 minutes
- Country: India
- Language: Punjabi

Khido Khundi is a 2018 Punjabi film about hockey. The movie depicts the reality of the Indian hockey players from Sansarpur, Punjab, India.

== Plot ==
Khido Khundi portrays two brothers, and the passion for hockey in Punjab.

== Cast ==
- Ranjit Bawa as Fateh
- Manav Vij as Harry
- Mandy Takhar as Laali
- Guggu Gill as Balveer Singh
- Mahabir Bhullar as Pargat Singh
- Elnaaz Norouzi as Naaz
- Seema Kaushal
- Jatinder Kaur as Bachni Kaur
- James Breakey as Captain Ruff

== Reception ==
Sakshi Batra of PTC Punjabi wrote, "Rohit has won our hearts with his unconventional direction. He has perfectly used the right blend of locations along with the talented star cast of the movie." Jasmine Singh of Tribune India wrote, "For one, Rohit Jugraj has picked up a really inspiring story and shot it really well. He has used all the locations and actors to the best of their ability. But what seems to be the biggest drawback of Khido Khundi is that where the first half of the film is racy and also belongs to Rohit Jugraj, the second half looks so much like Chak De India- with the boys of course!
