= Rajshree =

Indian actress

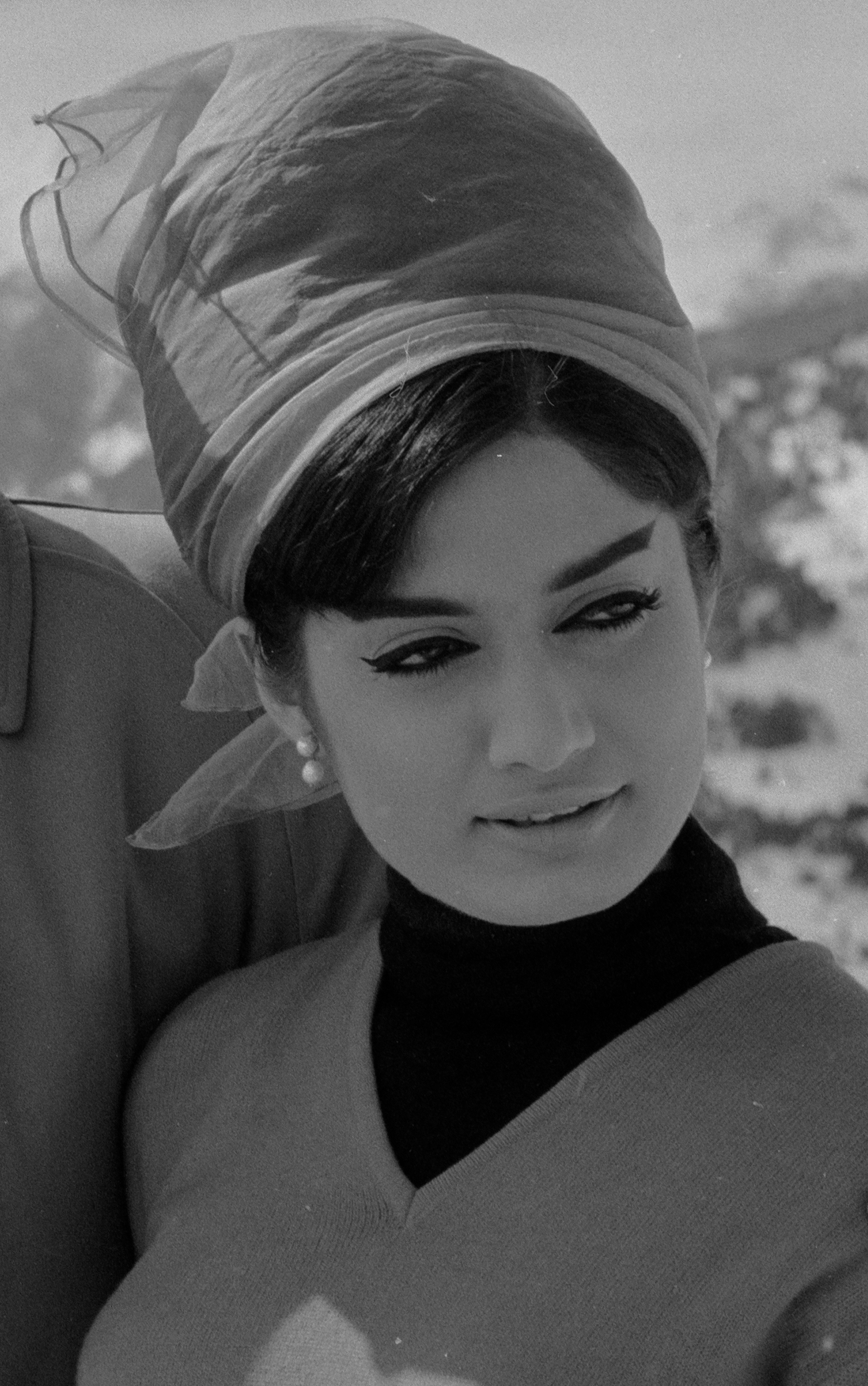
- Rajshree in 1966
- Born: Rajashree Shantaram; Bombay, British Raj
- Citizenship: American
- Occupation: Actress
- Years active: 1954; 1961–1973
- Spouse: Greg Chapman (m. 1967)
- Children: Chandrika Chapman (daughter)
- Parent(s): V. Shantaram (father), Jayashree (mother)

Rajashree Shantaram, known mononymously as Rajshree, is an Indian actress. She is best known for her work in the movies Janwar and Brahmachari.

== Personal life ==
Rajshree is the daughter of acclaimed Indian filmmaker V. Shantaram and actress Jayshree, his second wife. Her brother Kiran Shantaram was a former Sheriff of Mumbai. She is of Marathi descent. Her father's side practiced Jainism.

While shooting with Raj Kapoor in America for the film Around the World, she met American student Greg Chapman. The two married three years later, on 28 November 1967 in an Indian ceremony that lasted five days. She went with her husband to permanently live in America. They have one daughter Chandrika and live in Los Angeles.

She has lived in the United States for more than 30 years, where she and her husband have operated custom clothing business. She has also remained connected to film and media work, serving as an assistant director on Hack-O-Lantern, Tainted Love, and Monsoon. In addition, she provided narration for the children's video Ashok By Another Name.

== Filmography ==
Year	Film	Role	Notes
1954	Subah Ka Tara	Sogi	Debut film; Child artist; produced & directed by dad V. Shantaram
1961	Stree	Maithika	Produced & directed by dad V. Shantaram
1963	Ghar Basake Dekho	Sharada Mehra	
1963	Grahasti	Kiran Khanna	
1964	Geet Gaya Patharon Ne	Vidya	Produced & directed by dad V. Shantaram
1964	Ji Chahta Hai	Meeta	
1964	Shehnai	Preeti	
1965	Do Dil	Bijli	
1965	Janwar	Sapna	
1966	Mohabbat Zindagi Hai	Neeta	
1966	Sagaai	Sheel	
1967	Around the World	Reeta	
1967	Dil Ne Pukara	Asha	
1967	Gunahon Ka Devta	Kesar	
1968	Brahmachari	Sheetal Chaudhary	
1968	Suhaag Raat	Rajjo	
1973	Naina	Naina	Last release
