= The Remarkable Mr. Pennypacker =

1959 film by Henry Levin

- Poster
- Directed by: Henry Levin
- Screenplay by: Walter Reisch
- Based on: The Remarkable Mr. Pennypacker; 1953 play by Liam O'Brien
- Produced by: Charles Brackett
- Starring: Clifton Webb; Dorothy McGuire; Charles Coburn; Jill St. John; Ron Ely
- Cinematography: Milton R. Krasner
- Edited by: William Mace
- Music by: Leigh Harline
- Distributed by: 20th Century-Fox
- Release dates: January 4, 1959 (United Kingdom); February 20, 1959 (New York City)
- Running time: 87 minutes
- Country: United States
- Language: English
- Budget: $1,475,000
- Box office: $1.3 million (est. US/ Canada rentals)

The Remarkable Mr. Pennypacker is a 1959 American DeLuxe Color comedy film starring Clifton Webb and Dorothy McGuire directed by Henry Levin in CinemaScope. The film is based on the 1953 Broadway play of the same title, which ran for 221 performances and which had featured Burgess Meredith as Horace Pennypacker and Martha Scott as 'Ma' Pennypacker.

At the turn of the 20th century, businessman Horace Pennypacker Jr., has two families: one wife and eight children in Harrisburg, Pennsylvania, and nine children (by a deceased wife) in Philadelphia. During the course of events, his bigamy is uncovered, and he struggles to maintain the status quo.

== Plot summary ==
In turn-of-the-20th-century Harrisburg, Pennsylvania, young Wilbur Fielding, the son of the Rev. Dr. Fielding, has been appointed vicar of a small Rhode Island parish. His position secured, Wilbur proposes to his sweetheart, Kate Pennypacker. As he must leave for his new post in one week, Kate wants to marry immediately, rather than endure a conventional extended engagement.

Kate's father, Horace Pennypacker Jr., the proprietor of the Pennypacker sausage factory, divides his business life between his factories in Harrisburg and Philadelphia, spending alternate months in each city. While Horace is in Philadelphia, his wife, Emily, summons him home to Harrisburg for the wedding. Horace motors to Harrisburg, narrowly avoiding the Philadelphia sheriff who has come to issue him a summons for promoting a book about Darwinism that prominently depicts the police chief as a monkey.

Back in Harrisburg, Horace's blustery father, Horace Sr. protests the impropriety of Kate's hasty marriage. Unknown to Horace Sr., Emily, and the eight Pennypacker children, Horace has a second family of nine children in Philadelphia. When Horace III, Horace's eldest Philadelphia son, learns of the sheriff's summons, he rushes to Harrisburg to warn his father. Horace III arrives in Harrisburg before his father, appearing on the Pennypacker doorstep. He introduces himself and inadvertently exposes Horace's unknown Philadelphia family. Soon after, Horace arrives home and is struck dumb by seeing Horace III. As Emily questions Horace about his secret life, Wilbur and his father arrive to discuss the wedding. This follows with Horace Sr. announcing that his son is a bigamist. As Horace Sr. leaves, the sheriff arrives and serves him the summons meant for his son. Horace Sr. strikes the sheriff with his cane and is arrested. Kate, devastated, declares she cannot marry Wilbur to protect his reputation, but Emily resolves her daughter will be happily married. Horace defends himself to Rev. Dr. Fielding, arguing that morality is a matter of geography and that he is doing mankind a great service by propagating the species.

Meanwhile, the younger Pennypacker children run away from home. As Emily removes her wedding ring, Horace searches for his brood but is arrested and jailed by the sheriff. The Rev. Dr. Fielding finds the Pennypacker children in his church, asleep in the pews. Locked in a cell with Horace Sr., Horace is visited by eldest son, Henry, who informs him Emily has gone to Philadelphia to meet his other wife. At Horace's Philadelphia home, Emily learns that the other Mrs. Pennypacker died eight years earlier. Horace is released from jail after apologizing to the sheriff and returns home to a chilly reception.

Emily returns to Harrisburg and declares their marriage is over. Horace steadfastly defends himself, declaring he did nothing wrong. The children say if it was not wrong then he would not have concealed his other family. Horace realizes he broke his own rule. Coming to her husband's defense, Emily tells the children that their stepfamily is motherless and reassures Kate there will be no public scandal as the other Mrs. Pennypacker died years ago. Chastened, Horace apologizes to his children and relinquishes their education to Emily. Jane, Horace's spinster sister decides to move to Philadelphia to care for her motherless nieces and nephews. As Horace packs his suitcases to leave, the children beg him to stay, and with Emily's permission, he unpacks.

Soon after, Kate and Wilbur are married. Emily is so moved by the wedding that she asks the Rev. Dr. Fielding to renew her and Horace's vows. As the minister conducts the ceremony, Emily tells Horace to repeat the phrase, "forsaking all others."

== Cast ==
- Clifton Webb as Mr. Horace Pennypacker Jr.
- Dorothy McGuire as Emily 'Ma' Pennypacker
- Charles Coburn as Grampa Pennypacker
- Jill St. John as Kate Pennypacker
- Ron Ely as Wilbur Fielding
- Ray Stricklyn as Horace Pennypacker III
- David Nelson as Henry Pennypacker
- Dorothy Stickney as Aunt Jane Pennypacker
- Larry Gates as Rev. Dr. Fielding
- Richard Deacon as Sheriff

== Production ==
Walter Reisch who worked on the script later recalled, "On the stage it was funny, but on the screen it didn't come off at all. Neither Clifton nor Brackett, the producer, nor Henry Levin, the director, really believed that Clifton would have a family in Philadelphia and another whole family in Harrisburg."

== Adaptations ==
The Remarkable Mr. Pennypacker was adapted into two Indian films: Grahasti (1963, Hindi) and Motor Sundaram Pillai (1966, Tamil).

== See also ==
- List of American films of 1959
