= Visphy Kharradi =

Martial artist and athlete

- Born: 27 January 1980 (age 46); Surat, Gujarat, India
- Height: 177.8 cm (5 ft 10 in)
- Rank: 5th Dan Black Belt in karate. 3rd Dan Black Belt in Kūdō. 1st Dan Black Belt in Judo. 2nd Dan Black Belt in Kenjutsu.

Other information
- Occupation: Martial artist; actor; stunt director; stunt performer
- University: Indian Institute of Management Bangalore; S.R Luthra College Surat (MBA)
- Spouse: Frzana kharradi (m. 2004)
- Children: Zidaan Kharradi, Yazdan Kharradi
- Website: vispykharadi.com

Visphy Kharradi (born Vispy Kharadi) is an Indian athlete, MMA (Mixed Martial Arts) expert, and fitness model. Kharradi is known as the "Steel Man of India". In 2024, he set a world record for holding two Hercules Pillars, each 123 inches in height with a diameter of 20.5 inches, weighing 166.7 kg and 168.9 kg, for the longest duration.

Kharradi holds multiple black belts in different forms of martial arts. He is also a certified sports nutritionist from the International Sports Science Academy in the USA and pediatric nutritionist, he began promoting the Kūdō martial art form in India alongside Akshay Kumar and Mehul Vora.

Kharradi has worked as a stunt choreographer and action trainer for many Bollywood films like Brothers and Naam Shabana, and also acted in these movies. He has trained Indian Army & Border Security Force (BSF) commandos in armed and unarmed combat and survival techniques.

Elon Musk praised Kharradi's achievement and shared a video of his world record attempt on his Twitter (Now X) handle.

In 2025, at the Attari–Wagah border, he held the Hercules Pillars for 1 minute and 7 seconds, setting the longest recorded duration for the event. Each pillar weighed 261 kilograms.

== Early Life & Family ==
Kharradi was born on 27 January 1980 in Surat. He is married to Frzana Kharradi, and the couple has two sons, Zidaan and Yazdan. Frzana Kharradi won the Femina Mrs. Stylista title in 2022 and works as a fitness coach and nutritionist. Their son, Zidaan Kharradi, is a KUDO World Champion and mixed martial artist, while Yazdan is a youngest Kudo and Kenjutsu practitioner who holds a black belt.

== Career ==
=== Career as martial artist and trainer ===
Kharradi taught martial arts while pursuing a career in banking before beginning his professional martial arts career in 2015. He has earned black belts in several martial arts disciplines, including Kūdō, Karate, Judo, and Kenjutsu. He is also a strength training coach and a certified sports and pediatric nutritionist.

In addition to martial arts, Kharradi has worked as a stunt choreographer and action trainer for Bollywood films, including Brothers and Naam Shabana, and has also appeared in films as an actor. He has provided armed and unarmed combat and survival training to personnel from the Indian Army and the Border Security Force (BSF).

=== Career as Entrepreneur ===
In 2025, he launched GP Life Wellness, a plant-based supplement company focused on wellness and disease management solutions.

=== Movies ===
Year	Title	Role	Ref.
2015	Brothers	Trainer with Akshay Kumar	
2017	Naam Shabana	Trainer with Tapsee Pannu	

=== Tv Shows ===
Year	Show	Notes	Ref.
2011	Guinness World Records – Ab India Todega	Guinness World record of 5 layers broken.	
2017	America's Got Talent Season 12	Blindfolded Sword Chopping	
2014	OMG! Yeh Mera India	appeared in 2nd episode of season 10	
2026	Wheel of Fortune India	appeared episode 49 of season 1	

== Honors ==
=== World records ===
Kharradi hold more than 17 Guinness World Records.

- 2025: Guinness World Records – For Holding Hercules Pillar of 261 kg in each hand and holding it for 1 minute 7 seconds.
- 2025: Guinness World Records – For the heaviest weight which is 1819 kg sustained on the body.
- 2024: Guinness World Records – Hercules pillar holds two minutes and 10.75 seconds.
- 2024: Guinness World Records – Most Layers Human and Nail Bed Sandwich.
- 2023: Guinness World Records – Most People on Bed of Nails. 5 Layers Sandwich + 6 people standing on top, Performed in Milan, Italy.
- 2023: Guinness World Records – Most Iron Bars Bent with Head in 1 Minute.
- 2023: Guinness World Records – Heaviest Concrete Block Broken on Nail Bed.
- 2022: Guinness World Records – Heaviest Concrete Block were broken on Bed of Nails Sandwich.
- 2022: Guinness World Records – Most Concrete Blocks broken with Elbow in 1 minute.
- 2022: Guinness World Records – Most Drink Cans Crushed in 1 Minute.
- 2019: Guinness World Records – Most Iron Rod Bent with Neck in 1 minute.
- 2019: Guinness World Records – Most Layered Human and Nailbed Sandwich (9 Layers)
- 2018:Guinness World Records – Most Watermelon Cut on Stomach with a Japanese Katana Sword.
- 2017:Guinness World Records – Watermelon Cut on Stomach with a Japanese Katana Sword.
- 2017: Guinness World Records – Most Layered Bed of Nails Sandwich (8 Layers).
- 2014: Guinness World Records – 6 Layers of Human and Nail Bed Sandwich.
- 2010: Guinness World Records – Ab India Todega – Guinness World record of 5 layers broken.
