= Nayantara (Marathi actress) =

Indian actress

- Born: 1950; Maharashtra
- Died: 30 November 2014 (aged 64); Thane, Maharashtra
- Occupation: Actress
- Years active: 1968–2009

Nayantara (1950 – 30 November 2014) was an Indian actress who worked in Marathi films, television and theatre. She is better known for her role of Leelabai Kalbhor in Ashi Hi Banwa Banwi (1988).

== Filmography ==
=== Films ===
| Year | Title | Role | Language | Notes |
|---|---|---|---|---|
| 1970 | Gharkul | Unnamed | Marathi | Small role |
| 1971 | Man Tera Tan Mera | Rajni | Hindi | Hindi debut |
| 1971 | Kunkwacha Karanda | Sharda Devbhakt | Marathi | Supporting role |
| 1977 | Bala Gau Kashi Angai | Alka | Marathi | Lead role |
| 1987 | Prem Karuya Khullam Khulla | Savitri Inamdar | Marathi | |
| 1987 | Anandi Anand | Inspector Maya | Marathi | |
| 1987 | Khara Kadhi Bolu Naye | Chanchala Bai | Marathi | |
| 1988 | Ashi Hi Banwa Banwi | Leelabai Kalbhor | Marathi | Supporting role |
| 1988 | Kiss Bai Kiss | Gauri & Archana's mother | Marathi | |
| 1988 | Aai Pahije | Banarasi | Marathi | |
| 1988 | Mamla Porincha | Mrs. Baghde | Marathi | |
| 1989 | Saglikade Bombabomb | Maya Mhapsekar | Marathi | Cameo appearance |
| 1990 | Changu Mangu | Malti Dongre | Marathi | |
| 1992 | Than Than Gopal | Usha's Aunt | Marathi | |
| 1992 | Khulyancha Bazaar | Manya's wife | Marathi | |
| 1993 | Bharla Malvat Ha Rakhtana | Hirabai | Marathi | |
| 1993 | Tu Sukhkarta | Manohar's mother | Marathi | |
| 1998 | Jigar | Parvati | Marathi | |
| 1999 | Lo Main Aa Gaya | Ajay's mother | Hindi | |
| 1999 | Dhangad Dhinga | Arundhati | Marathi | |
| 2000 | Khiladi 420 | Ritu's grandmother | Hindi | |
| 2002 | Aadhar | Tarkabai | Marathi | |
| 2005 | Chalta Hai Yaar | Mrs. Malhar Rao Patil | Hindi | |
| 2006 | Deva Shappath Khote Sangen, Khare Sangnar Nahi | Gauri's sister | Marathi | |

=== Play ===
- Karti Premat Padali [Stage Drama]
- Shantech Kart Chalu Aahe [Stage Drama]
- Smart Vadhu Pahije [Stage Drama]
- Ithe Bhetalat Tar Bhetalat [Stage Drama]
- Mulga Maza Bajirao [Stage Drama]
- Kharyachi Duniya [Stage Drama]
- Caption Yenar Aahe [Stage Drama]

== See also ==
- Marathi cinema
