= Suhaag Raat (1968 film) =

- Theatrical release poster
- Directed by: R. Bhattacharya
- Written by: H.A. Rahi
- Produced by: R. Bhattacharya
- Starring: Jeetendra; Rajshree
- Cinematography: Marshal Braganza
- Edited by: Mohan Rathod
- Music by: Kalyanji Anandji
- Production company: A.J.Pictures
- Release date: 31 December 1968
- Running time: 140 minutes
- Country: India
- Language: Hindi

Suhaag Raat (transl. Wedding Night) is a 1968 Hindi-language drama film, produced and directed by R. Bhattacharya under the A.J. Pictures banner. It stars Jeetendra and Rajshree, with music composed by Kalyanji Anandji.

== Plot ==
Rajjo, a charming girl, is in love with Flight Lieutenant Jeetendra. Just before their wedding, the Indian army declares an emergency. So, Jeet pauses and moves to the battlefield. Following his departure, aerial bombardment smashes their town. Rajjo loses her family in it, and she is further shattered upon learning of Jeet's death, and re-locates to her uncle's residence. Jeet returns despaired due to a quandary and turns into a wanderer. During that time, a wise lady, Rani Saheba, shelters and appoints him as her manager. Rani Saheba is always perturbed because of the debauchery of her son, Thakur Uday Singh, when Jeet suggests getting him married.

Destiny makes Rajjo Uday's bride, which devastates Jeet, but he stays quiet. The same night, Uday visits the court area, brawls with Nawab Ladan, and kills him. Frightened, he absconds, jumps into a river, and is declared dead. Suddenly, one night, Uday meets Rajjo, consummates their marriage, and takes an oath not to reveal his existence. Soon Rajjo conceives his child. Everyone denounces her as she doesn't reveal Uday's name, accusing Jeet of discerning their previous familiarity, and the two are ostracized. Jeet accommodates Rajjo in a safe place and secretly shields her. Rajjo gives birth to a baby boy.

Eventually, Uday shadows his wife & son in disguise. Once, spotting intimacy between Uday & Rajjo, the villagers revolts upon learning the reality. Jeet guards him and is seriously injured. Witnessing Jeet's selflessness, Uday repents, affirms the identity, and surrenders to the police. Jeet dies, and Uday is acquitted with the short-term penalty. The movie ends with Uday & Rajjo paying their gratitude to Jeet.

== Cast ==
- Jeetendra as Captain Jeetendra / Jeet
- Rajshree as Rajjo H. Rai
- Prakash Thapa as Thakur Uday Singh
- Mehmood as Juman Bijnori
- Chandrakant Gokhale as Pandit
- Bipin Gupta
- Moni Chatterjee as Lala Harsukh Rai
- Dhumal as Parwana
- Mehmood Jr. as Banne
- Sulochana Latkar as Rani Saheba
- Tun Tun as Titli Banu
- Shabnam
- Madhumati as Qayamat Bai
- Neelam as Chamkili Bai
- Laxmi Chhaya as Mohabbat Bai
- Mridula Rani as Shanta H. Rai

== Soundtrack ==
#	Title	Singer(s)	Lyricist(s)
1	"Are Oh Re"	Kishore Kumar	Indeevar
2	"Ganga Maiya Mein"	Lata Mangeshkar	Indeevar
3	"Khush Raho"	Mukesh	Indeevar
4	"Main Qayamat Hoon"	Lata Mangeshkar, Asha Bhosle	Akhtar Romani
5	"Mere Dil Se Dil Ko"	Manna Dey	Qamar Jalalabadi
6	"Mohe Laagi Re Laagi"	Lata Mangeshkar	Qamar Jalalabadi
