= Elnaaz Norouzi =

Iranian-German actress, model and singer (born 1992)

- الناز نوروزی
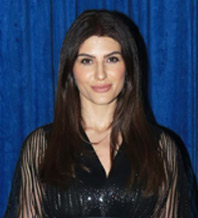
- Norouzi in 2025
- Born: 9 July 1992 (age 34); Tehran, Iran
- Citizenship: Germany
- Education: Goetheschule
- Occupations: Actress; model; singer
- Years active: 2010s–present
- Website: elnaaznorouzi.com

Elnaaz Norouzi (Persian: الناز نوروزی, romanized: Ilnāz Nurūzī; born 9 July 1992) is an Iranian-German actress, model and singer who mainly works in Indian films and television. She is best known for playing the role of Zoya Mirza in the Indian crime thriller series Sacred Games.

== Early life and education ==
Elnaaz Norouzi was born in Tehran, Iran. Her family moved to Hanover, Germany, when she was 8, where she grew up as a single child and spent her teenage years.

She started her career as a model, after her parents divorced, at the age of 14 in Germany. She went to school, while weekend photoshoots became a daily occurrence for her. She travelled around Asia and Europe until she was 19. After graduating from the Goetheschule in Hanover, she decided to move to India, being a fan of Hindi cinema.

== Career ==
In 2012, she found a new home in India. She appeared in commercials for various brands in India such as Hugo Boss, L'Oréal, Canon, Samsung, Le Coq Sportif, Dior, Thums Up, Titan, Myntra, Being Human, and Fiama di Wills among others.

Norouzi has said that she faced intense competition and significant structural barriers when she entered the Indian entertainment industry. To establish herself, she learned Hindi and Urdu, took dance and acting classes, and initially financed this training through modeling jobs.

In 2017, she made her debut in Pakistani film Maan Jao Na, playing the role of a young girl Raania. She entered the Indian entertainment industry by playing the role of Zoya Mirza in the Netflix web series Sacred Games. Later, Norouzi worked in many movies and series, including Hello Charlie, Chutzpah, Tehran, Abhay, Khido Khundi and Made in Heaven.

She performed an item number in Rashtra Kavach Om and JugJugg Jeeyo, produced by Karan Johar. In July 2022, she made her singing debut with "La La Love". She marks special appearance in the Marathi song "Hridayi Vasant Phultana", an item number from the Malind Kavde's directorial 2022 film Takatak 2.

She made her Hollywood debut with Gerard Butler in Kandahar (2023), a film by Ric Roman Waugh.

In June 2025, she entered as contestant in Amazon Prime Video's The Traitors and eliminated on Day 7 and placed 10th.

== Personal life ==
Norouzi has German citizenship.

Norouzi can speak English, German, French, Persian, Hindi, Punjabi and Urdu, which has helped her to act in various film industries.

In 2018, she accused director Vipul Shah of sexual harassment.

=== Views ===
Norouzi has been outspoken on issues of women's rights, particularly in the context of patriarchal societies and the film industry. She has emphasized the importance of structural changes that must go beyond mere superficialities. During the Mahsa Amini protests in Iran in 2022, Norouzi voiced support for the protests against the forced head covering. To support the Woman, Life, Freedom movement, which denounced the Government of Iran and the Islamic religious police, Norouzi posted a video of herself stripping down to being topless. In January 2026 she released her song "Javid Shah" in support of the 2025–2026 Iranian protests and Reza Pahlavi.

== Filmography ==
=== Films ===
Year	Title	Role	Language	Notes
2018	Maan Jao Na	Raania	Urdu	
2018	Khido Khundi	Naaz Grewal	Punjabi	
2021	Hello Charlie	Mona Malhotra	Hindi	
2022	Jugjugg Jeeyo	Russian Party Girl	Hindi	Guest appearance in the song "Dupatta"
2022	Rashtra Kavach Om	Dancer	Hindi	Guest appearance in the song "Kala Shah Kala"
2022	Takatak 2	Dancer	Marathi	Guest appearance in the song "Hridayi Vasant Phultana"
2023	Kandahar	Shina Asadi	English	
2023	Devil: The British Secret Agent	Rosy	Telugu	
2025	Tehran	Layla	Hindi	
2025	Mastiii 4	Bindia Saxena	Hindi	
2026	The Fix	Zara	English	

=== Television ===
Year	Title	Role	Language	Notes
2018–2019	Sacred Games	Zoya Mirza	Hindi	
2019	Abhay	Natasha Hashmi	Hindi	
2021	Chutzpah	Sara Khan	Hindi	
2022	Tehran	Yasaman Haddadi	Persian	
2023	Made in Heaven	Leila Shirazi	Hindi	
2024	Ranneeti: Balakot & Beyond	Fahima Naqvi	Hindi	
2025	Hai Junoon!	Goldie	Hindi	
2025	The Traitors	Contestant	Hindi	10th place (Traitor)
2026	Wheel of Fortune India	Co-host	Hindi	

=== Music videos ===
Year	Title	Singer	Notes
2018	"Dillagi"	Ranjit Bawa	From the film Khido Khundi.
2019	"Naagin Jaise Kamar Hila"	Tony Kakkar	
2018	"Made in India"	Guru Randhawa	
2022	"La La Love"	Herself	
2026	"Javid Shah"	Herself	
2026	"Hua"	Jubin Nautiyal	
