= Liam O'Brien (screenwriter) =

American screenwriter (1913–1996)

- Born: William O'Brien; March 7, 1913; New York City, U.S.
- Died: March 24, 1996 (aged 83); Los Angeles, California, U.S.
- Occupations: Screenwriter; television producer
- Years active: 1950–1986
- Spouse: Claudette O'Brien

Liam O'Brien (March 7, 1913 – March 24, 1996) was an American screenwriter and television producer, best known for writing the movie Here Comes the Groom.

== Life and career ==
O'Brien was educated at Fordham and Manhattan College. He had been a poet, cartoonist, and labor organizer before World War II, when he served in the Signal Corps. After the war, he headed to Hollywood, where his younger brother Edmond O'Brien was already an established star. He became an overnight success six years later when his first screenplay, the romantic comedy Here Comes the Groom, with Bing Crosby and Jane Wyman, earned him an Oscar nomination in 1951.

The following year, his play The Remarkable Mr. Pennypacker became a Broadway hit featuring Burgess Meredith. This romantic comedy was filmed by 20th Century Fox in 1959 with Clifton Webb in the title role. The play remains popular in amateur theatres, partly because there are so many roles to be filled: the industrialist Mr. Pennypacker is a loveable bigamist with 17 children.

His widow, Claudette O'Brien, claimed Pennypacker was based on the actual double life of an O'Brien relative – one who "laughed louder than anyone on opening night".

O'Brien collapsed in his wife's arms and died of a heart attack at his Los Angeles home at age 83.

His son, Devin Liam O' Brien, has been an associate producer of the Academy Award television broadcast.

== Filmography ==
=== Writer ===
- Chain Lightning (1950)
- Of Men and Music (1951)
- The Redhead and the Cowboy (1951)
- Here Comes the Groom (1951)
- Diplomatic Courier (1952)
- The Stars Are Singing (1953)
- Young at Heart (1955)
- Lux Video Theatre (1 episode, 1956)
- Trapeze (1956)
- The Remarkable Mr. Pennypacker (1959)
- The Great Impostor (1961)
- The Devil at 4 O'Clock (1961)
- Rex Harrison Presents Stories of Love (1974)
- Gibbsville (1 episode, 1976)
- Police Story (1 episode, 1977)
- The Awakening Land (1974)

=== Producer ===
- Police Story (Unknown episodes)
- The Mississippi (Unknown episodes)
- Miami Vice (4 episodes, 1985–1986)

== Awards and nominations ==
Year	Result	Award	Category	Film or series
1952	Nominated	Writers Guild of America Award	Best Written American Musical	Here Comes the Groom (Shared with Virginia Van Upp & Myles Connolly)
1952	Nominated	Academy Award	Best Writing, Motion Picture Story	Here Comes the Groom (Shared with Robert Riskin)
1976	Won	Emmy Award	Outstanding Drama Series	Police Story (Shared with David Gerber, Stanley Kallis & Carl Pingitore)
1977	Nominated	Emmy Award	Outstanding Drama Series	Police Story (Shared with David Gerber & Mel Swope)
1985	Nominated	Emmy Award	Outstanding Drama Series	Miami Vice (Shared with Richard Brams, George E. Crosby, Michael Mann, John Nicolella, Mel Swope & Anthony Yerkovich)
