= Ashi Hi Banwa Banwi =

- Theatrical release poster
- Directed by: Sachin Pilgaonkar
- Written by: Vasant Sabnis
- Based on: Biwi Aur Makan (1966) by Hrishikesh Mukherjee
- Produced by: Kiran Shantaram
- Starring: Ashok Saraf; Sachin Pilgaonkar; Laxmikant Berde; Siddharth Ray; Ashwini Bhave; Supriya Pilgaonkar; Priya Arun Berde; Nivedita Joshi-Saraf; Nayantara; Viju Khote; Sudhir Joshi
- Cinematography: Ram Allam
- Edited by: Avinash Thakur; Chintu Dhavale
- Music by: Arun Paudwal
- Production company: V. Shantaram Productions
- Release date: 23 September 1988 (Maharashtra)
- Running time: 156 minutes
- Country: India
- Language: Marathi
- Budget: 20 lakh
- Box office: ₹3 crore

Ashi Hi Banwa Banwi (transl. This Is Being Street–Smart) is a 1988 Indian Marathi-language slapstick comedy buddy film directed by Sachin and produced by Kiran Shantaram. The film is regarded as a cult film in Marathi cinema due to its overwhelming reception. The film stars an ensemble cast of Ashok Saraf, Sachin, Laxmikant Berde, Siddharth Ray, Ashwini Bhave, Supriya Pilgaonkar, Priya Arun Berde, Nivedita Joshi Saraf, Nayantara, Viju Khote, and Sudhir Joshi.

The film follows the core plot from the 1966 Hindi film Biwi Aur Makan directed by Hrishikesh Mukherjee, which was an adaptation of Sailesh Dey's Bengali play Joymakali Boarding. It was remade as Olu Saar Bari Olu (2003) in Kannada, Paying Guests (2009) in Hindi, Mr & Mrs 420 (2014) in Punjabi and Jio Pagla (2017) in Bengali. The film was also an inspiration for the 1991 Telugu film Chitram Bhalare Vichitram, which was remade in Kannada as Bombat Hendthi (1992), and in Tamil as Aanazhagan (1995).

== Plot ==
Dhananjay Mane is a street-smart salesman working at a cosmetics store in Pune and is secretly in love with his employer, Madhuri. He is the sole tenant of a stingy landlord, Vishwasrao Sarpotdar, and is soon joined in Pune by his younger brother, Shantanu, who is a medical student from Miraj. Though prohibited by Sarpotdar, Dhananjay and Shantanu allow their childhood friends, Sudhir and Parshuram, who is also known as Parshya, to secretly live with them since they have come to Pune from Kolhapur in search of jobs. Sudhir has been disowned by his old, abusive uncle (Suhas Bhalekar) for his negligence towards his job and income and participation in the typical village dance programs out of interest. Meanwhile, Parshya worked as a domestic worker for Chhaburao, a theatre contractor, who fired him after discovering that Parshya is in love with his daughter, Kamli. One midnight, Dhananjay, Sudhir and Parshya majorly insult Sarpotdar in a drunken state and are taken away from his house by Shantanu, who arrives at the scene a little late. Enraged by the harassment and deceit, Sarpotdar angrily storms into the rented room the next day and orders them all to vacate the place within four days.

After several unsuccessful attempts in finding rented accommodation, Dhananjay and Shantanu finally reach the bungalow of a rich, old, kind and cataractic widow, Leelabai Kalbhor, who lives with her shrewd domestic worker, Tanu (Gulab Korgaonkar), and is often harassed for her property by her estranged nephew, Bali. She is willing to rent some rooms in her bungalow provided that her tenants are married couples. In an attempt to comply with Leelabai's condition, Dhananjay and Shantanu have no other option, but to force Sudhir and Parshya to dress as women and thus begins the comedy of errors. Parshya shaves off his moustache and transforms himself into "Parvati", Dhananjay's wife, while Sudhir transforms himself into "Sudha", Shantanu's wife. Shortly after the arrival of the four friends at Leelabai's bungalow as "married couples", Leelabai's niece, Manisha and her childhood friend, Sushma, who is coincidentally Shantanu's girlfriend from Miraj, also arrive to stay with Leelabai for many months.

Sudhir, now a successful singer and music educator, falls in love with Manisha and courts her in his original form, stating that he is the twin brother of Sudha and that he had disapproved of her marriage with Shantanu and is thus not on talking terms with them both. On the other hand, Shantanu, having passed to become a successful doctor, narrates a fake story of the deadly stomach cancer of Sudha in front of Sushma since she is deeply upset at his betrayal of her and his marriage to Sudha. Elsewhere, Parshya reunites with Kamli when she comes to Pune with Chhaburao's theatre troupe and also shares the news of Parshya having become a successful playwright back in Kolhapur. Meanwhile, Madhuri is heartbroken to see Dhananjay married to Parvati during her visit to Leelabai's bungalow, but Dhananjay confides the truth in Madhuri through a letter and the two confess their love for each other. While the four friends develop a bond of motherly love with Leelabai, Tanu reveals Parvati and Sudha's identities to Bali after she notices Parshya's wig and Sudhir wearing earrings while jumping out from the bungalow window in his original form and the two plan to teach the four friends a lesson.

Eventually, the four friends decide to leave Leelabai's bungalow after finding a new accommodation with the help of Madhuri and stage a drama in front of Leelabai for their way out. However, in the process, the four friends are unfortunately attacked and exposed by Bali and his henchmen in front of Leelabai, Manisha and Sushma, and are handed over to the police brought in by Tanu for their crimes. However, at the police station, Leelabai surprisingly disowns Bali as her nephew and absolves the four friends of their deceit instead, since she feels from the bottom of her heart that they cheated on her out of their desperate need for a roof over their heads. She also accepts the truth that their intention was not to steal from her or take advantage of her cataract and only treated her like their own mother. Hence, Leelabai decides to take the four friends in as her own sons with the collective marriage of Dhananjay and Madhuri, Sudhir and Manisha, Parshya and Kamli, and Shantanu and Sushma. The film ends with all four newlywed couples taking a family photograph along with Leelabai.

== Cast ==
- Ashok Saraf as Dhananjay Mane
- Sachin Pilgaonkar as Sudhir / Sudha Shantanu Mane (fake)
- Laxmikant Berde as Parashuram "Parshya" / Parvati Dhananjay Mane (fake)
- Siddharth Ray as Shantanu Mane
- Ashwini Bhave as Madhuri "Madam"
- Supriya Pilgaonkar as Manisha
- Priya Arun as Kamali
- Nivedita Joshi as Sushma
- Nayantara as Leelabai "Mavshi" Kalbhor (the quartet's landlady)
- Viju Khote as Bali Kalbhor (Leelabai's nephew)
- Sudhir Joshi as Vishwas Sarpotdar (the quartet's ex-landlord)
- Lata Thatte as Mrs. Vishwas Sarpotdar (Vishwas' wife)
- Gulab Korgaonkar as Tanu (Leelabai's domestic worker)
- Jairam Kulkarni as Chhaburao (Kamali's father)

=== Cameo Appearances ===
- Suhas Bhalekar as Kaka (Sudhir's paternal uncle)
- Bipin Varti as Police Inspector who arrests the quartet
- Madhu Apte as assistant of Venus Records and Tapes' manager who visits Sudhir's workplace with him
- Avinash Thakur as shop member
- Chintu Dhavale as car driver

=== Character Analysis ===
- Dhananjay Mane – The character of Dhananjay is portrayed by Ashok Saraf. Dhananjay is an equal bit of serious as well as witty. He is very quick with his words and also has a romantic side to him.
- Sudhir / Sudha Shantanu Mane (fake) – The character of Sudhir is portrayed by Sachin Pilgaonkar. Sudhir is interested in music and will go to any extent to protect his loved ones. Sachin's ace acting skills ensured that despite being dressed as a woman for most part of the film, the audience could see a glimpse of Sudhir quite clearly.
- Parashuram "Parshya" / Parvati Dhananjay Mane (fake) – The character of Parshya is portrayed by Laxmikant Berde. Berde's well-timed comedy and his stellar screen presence are what made the character of Parshya popular. He was a delight to watch despite having to dress as a woman for most part of the film. Parshya is quite sensitive and has a flair for writing. He is romantic, but also very understanding.
- Shantanu Mane – The character of Shantanu is portrayed by Siddharth Ray. Shantanu is the youngest in the friends and also very serious when it comes to his studies. He is a medical student, but is also a fun-loving youngster and great at improvising.
- Madhuri "Madam" – The character of Madhuri is portrayed by Ashwini Bhave. Madhuri is an employer woman, but secretly loves her employee. She is focused and dedicated, yet she has a soft heart.
- Manisha – The character of Manisha is portrayed by Supriya Pilgaonkar. Manisha is a bubbly and cheerful girl with large dreams. She is aware of exactly all her desires and is not afraid to pursue them.
- Kamali – The character of Kamali is portrayed by Priya Arun. Kamli is a soft-hearted girl, but would stand up for what she believes in and would do anything for her closed ones.
- Sushma – The character of Sushma is portrayed by Nivedita Joshi. Sushma is very understanding as well as an independent girl. She is kind-hearted and values people and relationships.
- Leelabai "Mavshi" Kalbhor – The character of Leelabai Kalbhor is portrayed by Nayantara. Leelabai is extremely naive and trusts people easily and blindly. She is kind-hearted as well as a motherly figure to the quartet.
- Bali Kalbhor – The character of Bali is portrayed by Viju Khote. Bali is the antagonist in the film, who does not value relations and is a spoilt brat. However, he is also filled with vengeance and would go to any extent for the sake of money.
- Vishwas Sarpotdar – The character of Vishwas Sarpotdar is portrayed by Sudhir Joshi. Vishwas is a petty man with a loudmouth, who aims to profit from every situation and is always searching for the easy way out.
- Mrs. Vishwas Sarpotdar – The character of Mrs. Sarpotdar is portrayed by Lata Thatte. Mrs. Sarpotdar is quite traditional and easygoing compared to her husband.
- Tanu – The character of Tanu is portrayed by Gulab Korgaonkar. Tanu is a grey character in the film and was quite good at establishing her motive despite not having much screen time.

== Production ==
Sachin chose to play the dual role of Sudhir/Sudha himself. Ashok Saraf was cast as Dhananjay Mane, marking his fourth collaboration with Sachin. Laxmikant Berde was selected for the role of Parshuram/Parvati. Although initially enthusiastic, Berde was hesitant after learning that the character involved cross-dressing; however, Sachin reassured him that the role would earn him even greater appreciation from audiences.

Producer Kiran Shantaram recommended his son, Siddharth Ray, for the role of Shantanu. Supriya Pilgaonkar and Nivedita Joshi Saraf were cast as Manisha and Sushma, respectively. Nayantara was chosen to play Leelabai Kalbhor. Kishori Shahane was initially considered for the role of Madhuri, but after she declined, the part was given to Ashwini Bhave. The film also marked the acting debut of Priya Berde. Viju Khote was cast as the antagonist, Bali.

All actors provided their own dubbing, except Priya Berde, whose character Kamli was dubbed by Shubhangi Rawate. This was due to the climax being re-shot at a later date, by which time Berde was unavailable because of her theatre commitments.

=== Filming ===
The shooting took place primarily in Pune. Pashan Road, where the characters are shown moving into Leelabai Kalbhor’s bungalow, is a real location; however, the bungalow itself was a specially constructed set for the film.

The shop featured in the romantic track between Ashok Saraf and Ashwini Bhave was an actual store, owned by a friend of director and actor Sachin Pilgaonkar.

The popular song "Hridayi Vasant Phulatana" was filmed at various locations across Pune. Portions of the film were also shot at the College of Engineering Pune (COEP). Additionally, some scenes were reportedly filmed in Kolhapur.

== Soundtrack ==
Ashi Hi Banwa Banwi

Soundtrack album by Arun Paudwal
- Released: 1988
- Genre: Feature film soundtrack
- Length: 22:17
- Language: Marathi
- Label: Ishtar Music

Official audio
- Ashi Hi Banwa Banwi - Full Album on YouTube

The lyrics were penned by Shantaram Nandgaonkar and Sudhir Moghe. The song "Hridayi Vasant Phulatana" was sung by Anuradha Paudwal, Suresh Wadkar, Sudesh Bhosle, Uttara Kelkar, Shailendra Singh, Amit Kumar, Suhasini, Aparna Mayekar, and Sachin Pilgaonkar.

=== Track listing ===
All music is composed by Arun Paudwal.

No.	Title	Lyrics	Singer (s)	Length
1.	"Shirshak Geet (Opening Title Theme)"	Shantaram Nandgaonkar	Sachin Pilgaonkar, Suresh Wadkar, Sudesh Bhosale, Shailendra Singh	4:18
2.	"Hi Duniya Mayajaal Manuja Jaag Jara"	Shantaram Nandgaonkar	Suresh Wadkar, Sachin Pilgaonkar	5:00
3.	"Banwa Banwi, Ashi Hi Banwa Banwi"	Shantaram Nandgaonkar	Sachin Pilgaonkar, Suresh Wadkar, Amit Kumar, Shailendra Singh	5:01
4.	"Ga Kunitari Yenar Yenar Ga"	Sudhir Moghe	Anuradha Paudwal, Uttara Kelkar, Suhasini	4:40
5.	"Hridayi Vasant Phulatana Premas Rang Yaave"	Shantaram Nandgaonkar	Suresh Wadkar, Sudesh Bhosle, Shailendra Singh, Sachin Pilgaonkar, Anuradha Paudwal, Aparna Mayekar	7:06
Total length:				22:17

== Legacy ==
Ashi Hi Banwa Banwi remains a significant work in Marathi cinema, influencing comedic storytelling and cultural discourse. The film has achieved cult classic status for its blend of humour, relatable characters, and witty dialogues. Iconic lines, such as Dhananjay Mane Ithech Rahtat Ka? ("Does Dhananjay Mane live here?") and "Ha Majha Bayko, Parvati." ("He is my wife, Parvati."), have permeated popular culture, frequently quoted in various contexts. Featuring strong performances from actors like Saraf, Sachin, and Berde, the film showcased exceptional comedic timing, influencing future generations of actors. The film has inspired many subsequent works exploring similar themes of identity and family dynamics, solidifying its place as a reference point for filmmakers. Even decades after its release, the film enjoys enduring popularity through re-runs on television and screenings at cultural festivals.
